= Wrestling at the 1988 Summer Olympics – Men's freestyle 52 kg =

Men's freestyle 52 kg at the Games of the XXIV Olympiad
- Venue: Sangmu Gymnasium
- Dates: 28–30 September 1988
- Competitors: 30 from 30 nations

Medalists
1st place, gold medalist(s)		Mitsuru Sato	Japan
2nd place, silver medalist(s)		Šaban Trstena	Yugoslavia
3rd place, bronze medalist(s)		Vladimir Toguzov	Soviet Union

The Men's freestyle 52 kg at the 1988 Summer Olympics as part of the wrestling program were held at the Sangmu Gymnasium, Seongnam.

== Medalists ==
Gold	Mitsuru Sato; Japan
Silver	Šaban Trstena; Yugoslavia
Bronze	Vladimir Toguzov; Soviet Union

== Tournament results ==
The wrestlers are divided into 2 groups. The winner of each group decided by a double-elimination system.

Legend

- TF — Won by fall
- SP — Won by superiority, 12-14 points difference, the loser with points
- SO — Won by superiority, 12-14 points difference, the loser without points
- ST — Won by technical superiority, 15 points difference
- PP — Won by points, the loser with technical points
- PO — Won by points, the loser without technical points
- P0 — Won by passivity, scoring zero points
- P1 — Won by passivity, while leading by 1-11 points
- PS — Won by passivity, while leading by 12-14 points
- PA — Won by opponent injury
- DQ — Won by forfeit
- DNA — Did not appear
- L — Losses
- ER — Round of elimination
- CP — Classification points
- TP — Technical points

=== Eliminatory round ===
==== Group A ====
L		CP	TP		L
Round 1
0	Majid Torkan (IRI)	4-0 ST	15-0	Lo Chao-cheng (TPE)	1
1	Chris Woodcroft (CAN)	0-4 ST	0-16	Vladimir Toguzov (URS)	0
0	Aslan Seyhanlı (TUR)	4-0 ST	15-0	Surya Saputra (INA)	1
1	Garba Lame (NGR)	0-4 TF	5:18	Władysław Stecyk (POL)	0
0	Bernardo Olvera (MEX)	4-0 TF	2:41	Edvin-Eduardo Vásquez (GUA)	1
1	Ken Chertow (USA)	1-3 PP	1-5	Thierry Bourdin (FRA)	0
0	Valentin Yordanov (BUL)	4-0 TF	2:02	Carlos Negron (PUR)	1
1	Ousmane Diallo (GUI)	0-4 ST	0-15	Šaban Trstena (YUG)	0
Round 2
0	Majid Torkan (IRI)	4-0 TF	5:42	Chris Woodcroft (CAN)	2
2	Lo Chao-Cheng (TPE)	0-4 TF	0:42	Vladimir Toguzov (URS)	0
0	Aslan Seyhanlı (TUR)	4-0 ST	16-1	Garba Lame (NGR)	2
2	Surya Saputera (INA)	0-4 TF	1:48	Władysław Stecyk (POL)	0
1	Bernardo Olvera (MEX)	1-3 PP	7-10	Ken Chertow (USA)	1
2	Edvin-Eduardo Vásquez (GUA)	0-4 ST	0-16	Thierry Bourdin (FRA)	0
0	Valentin Yordanov (BUL)	4-0 ST	17-1	Oushane Diallo (GUI)	2
2	Carlos Negron (PUR)	0-4 ST	1-16	Šaban Trstena (YUG)	0
Round 3
1	Majid Torkan (IRI)	1-3 PP	2-4	Vladimir Toguzov (URS)	0
0	Aslan Seyhanlı (TUR)	3-1 PP	8-4	Władysław Stecyk (POL)	1
2	Bernardo Olvera (MEX)	0-3 P1	5:08	Thierry Bourdin (FRA)	0
2	Ken Chertow (USA)	.5-3.5 SP	6-19	Valentin Yordanov (BUL)	0
0	Šaban Trstena (YUG)			Bye	
Round 4
0	Šaban Trstena (YUG)	4-0 PA	0:21	Majid Torkan (IRI)	2
0	Vladimir Toguzov (URS)	3-1 PP	5-4	Aslan Seyhanlı (TUR)	1
1	Władysław Stecyk (POL)	3-1 PP	6-2	Thierry Bourdin (FRA)	1
0	Valentin Yordanov (BUL)			Bye	
Round 5
1	Valentin Yordanov (BUL)	1-3 PP	5-11	Šaban Trstena (YUG)	0
0	Vladimir Toguzov (URS)	4-0 ST	17-1	Władysław Stecyk (POL)	2
1	Aslan Seyhanlı (TUR)	3-1 PP	3-2	Thierry Bourdin (FRA)	2
Round 6
2	Valentin Yordanov (BUL)	.5-3.5 SP	1-14	Vladimir Toguzov (URS)	0
0	Šaban Trstena (YUG)	3-1 PP	7-3	Aslan Seyhanlı (TUR)	2
Round 7
0	Šaban Trstena (YUG)	3-0 PO	3-0	Vladimir Toguzov (URS)	1

Wrestler	L	ER	CP
Šaban Trstena (YUG)	0	-	21
Vladimir Toguzov (URS)	1	-	21.5
Aslan Seyhanlı (TUR)	2	6	16
Valentin Yordanov (BUL)	2	6	13
Władysław Stecyk (POL)	2	5	12
Thierry Bourdin (FRA)	2	5	12
Majid Torkan (IRI)	2	4	9
Bernardo Olvera (MEX)	2	3	5
Ken Chertow (USA)	2	3	4.5
Oushane Diallo (GUI)	2	2	0
Garba Lame (NGR)	2	2	0
Carlos Negron (PUR)	2	2	0
Chris Woodcroft (CAN)	2	2	0
Lo Chao-Cheng (TPE)	2	2	0
Edvin-Eduardo Vásquez (GUA)	2	2	0
Surya Saputera (INA)	2	2	0

==== Group B ====
L		CP	TP		L
Round 1
1	Florentino Tirante (PHI)	0-4 TF	0:16	László Bíró (HUN)	0
1	Nguyễn Kim Hương (VIE)	0-4 ST	3-18	Kuldeep Singh (IND)	0
1	Lamachi Elimu (KEN)	0-4 TF	1:11	Oscar Muñoz (COL)	0
0	Tserenbaataryn Enkhbayar (MGL)	3-1 PP	12-7	Fayadh Minati (IRQ)	1
1	Xu Jihua (CHN)	1-3 PP	8-15	Kim Jong-o (KOR)	0
0	Mitsuru Sato (JPN)	4-0 TF	0:45	Jihad Sharif (JOR)	1
0	Ahmad Naseer (AFG)	3-1 PP	7-3	Herbert Tutsch (FRG)	1
0	Anthony Morris (GBR)			DNA	
Round 2
2	Florentino Tirante (PHI)	0-4 TF	2:02	Nguyen Kim Huong (VIE)	1
0	László Bíró (HUN)	3-1 PP	11-5	Kuldeep Singh (IND)	1
2	Lamachi Elimu (KEN)	0-4 TF	1:02	Tserenbaataryn Enkhbayar (MGL)	0
0	Oscar Muñoz (COL)	3-1 PP	8-1	Fayadh Minati (IRQ)	2
2	Xu Jihua (CHN)	0-4 TF	4:02	Mitsuru Sato (JPN)	0
0	Kim Jong-Oh (KOR)	3-1 PP	8-5	Ahmad Naseer (AFG)	1
2	Jihad Sharif (JOR)	0-4 TF	2:16	Herbert Tutsch (FRG)	1
Round 3
0	László Bíró (HUN)	3-0 P1	4:16	Nguyen Kim Huong (VIE)	2
1	Kuldeep Singh (IND)	3-1 PP	12-6	Oscar Muñoz (COL)	1
1	Tserenbaataryn Enkhbayar (MGL)	1-3 PP	3-11	Kim Jong-Oh (KOR)	0
0	Mitsuru Sato (JPN)	4-0 TF	1:44	Ahmad Naseer (AFG)	2
1	Herbert Tutsch (FRG)			Bye	
Round 4
2	Herbert Tutsch (FRG)	0-4 TF	1:14	László Bíró (HUN)	0
2	Kuldeep Singh (IND)	1-3 PP	9-16	Tserenbaataryn Enkhbayar (MGL)	1
2	Oscar Muñoz (COL)	1-3 PP	4-12	Kim Jong-Oh (KOR)	0
0	Mitsuru Sato (JPN)			Bye	
Round 5
0	Mitsuru Sato (JPN)	4-0 TF	0:53	Tserenbaataryn Enkhbayar (MGL)	2
0	László Bíró (HUN)	3-1 PP	8-4	Kim Jong-Oh (KOR)	1
Round 6
0	Mitsuru Sato (JPN)	4-0 TF	2:55	László Bíró (HUN)	1
1	Kim Jong-Oh (KOR)			Bye	
Round 7
2	Kim Jong-Oh (KOR)	0-4 ST	0-15	Mitsuru Sato (JPN)	0
1	László Bíró (HUN)			Bye	

Wrestler	L	ER	CP
Mitsuru Sato (JPN)	0	-	24
László Bíró (HUN)	1	-	17
Kim Jong-Oh (KOR)	2	7	13
Tserenbaataryn Enkhbayar (MGL)	2	5	11
Kuldeep Singh (IND)	2	4	9
Oscar Muñoz (COL)	2	4	9
Herbert Tutsch (FRG)	2	4	5
Ahmad Naseer (AFG)	2	3	4
Nguyen Kim Huong (VIE)	2	3	4
Fayadh Minati (IRQ)	2	2	2
Xu Jihua (CHN)	2	2	1
Jihad Sharif (JOR)	2	2	0
Lamachi Elimu (KEN)	2	2	0
Florentino Tirante (PHI)	2	2	0
Anthony Morris (GBR)	0	0	0

=== Final round ===
	CP	TP	
7th place match
Valentin Yordanov (BUL)	0-4 PA		Tserenbaataryn Enkhbayar (MGL)
5th place match
Aslan Seyhanlı (TUR)	3-1 PP	5-4	Kim Jong-Oh (KOR)
Bronze medal match
Vladimir Toguzov (URS)	3.5-.5 SP	14-1	László Bíró (HUN)
Gold medal match
Šaban Trstena (YUG)	1-3 PP	2-13	Mitsuru Sato (JPN)

== Final standings ==
1. Mitsuru Sato (JPN)
2. Šaban Trstena (YUG)
3. Vladimir Toguzov (URS)
4. László Bíró (HUN)
5. Aslan Seyhanlı (TUR)
6. Kim Jong-Oh (KOR)
7. Tserenbaataryn Enkhbayar (MGL)
8. Valentin Yordanov (BUL)
