= Wrestling at the 1988 Summer Olympics – Men's Greco-Roman 52 kg =

Men's Greco-Roman 52 kg at the Games of the XXIV Olympiad
- Venue: Sangmu Gymnasium
- Dates: 19–21 September 1988
- Competitors: 21 from 21 nations

Medalists
1st place, gold medalist(s)		Jon Rønningen	Norway
2nd place, silver medalist(s)		Atsuji Miyahara	Japan
3rd place, bronze medalist(s)		Lee Jae-suk	South Korea

The Men's Greco-Roman 52 kg at the 1988 Summer Olympics as part of the wrestling program were held at the Sangmu Gymnasium, Seongnam.

== Tournament results ==
The wrestlers are divided into two groups. The winner of each group is decided by a double-elimination system.

Legend

- TF – Won by Fall
- SP – Won by Superiority, 12-14 points difference, the loser with points
- SO – Won by Superiority, 12-14 points difference, the loser without points
- ST – Won by Technical Superiority, 15 points difference
- PP – Won by Points, the loser with technical points
- PO – Won by Points, the loser without technical points
- P0 – Won by Passivity, scoring zero points
- P1 – Won by Passivity, while leading by 1-11 points
- PS – Won by Passivity, while leading by 12-14 points
- PA – Won by Opponent Injury
- DQ – Won by Forfeit
- DNA – Did not appear
- L – Losses
- ER – Round of Elimination
- CP – Classification Points
- TP – Technical Points

=== Eliminatory round ===
==== Group A ====
L		CP	TP		L
Round 1
0	Erol Kemah (TUR)	4-0 ST	18-0	Florentino Tirante (PHI)	1
0	Hristo Fliev (BUL)	4-0 ST	16-0	Jihad Sharif (JOR)	1
0	Tibor Jankovics (TCH)	4-0 TF	0:49	Edvin-Eduardo Vásquez (GUA)	1
1	Serge Robert (FRA)	0-3 PO	0-9	Atsuji Miyahara (JPN)	0
1	Abdolkarim Kakahaji (IRI)	1-3 PP	8-10	Esa Murtoaro (FIN)	0
0	Aleksandr Ignatenko (URS)			Bye	
Round 2
0	Alexander Ignatenko (URS)	4-0 TF	5:53	Erol Kemah (TUR)	1
2	Florentino Tirante (PHI)	0-4 DQ		Hristo Fliev (BUL)	0
2	Jihad Sharif (JOR)	0-4 DQ		Tibor Jankovics (TCH)	0
2	Edvin-Eduardo Vásquez (GUA)	0-4 ST	0-15	Serge Robert (FRA)	1
0	Atsuji Miyahara (JPN)	3-1 PP	6-1	Abdolkarim Kakahaji (IRI)	2
0	Esa Murtoaro (FIN)			Bye	
Round 3
1	Esa Murtoaro (FIN)	0-3 PO	0-10	Alexander Ignatenko (URS)	0
2	Erol Kemah (TUR)	0-4 ST	0-17	Hristo Fliev (BUL)	0
0	Tibor Jankovics (TCH)	3-0 P1	4:14	Serge Robert (FRA)	2
0	Atsuji Miyahara (JPN)			Bye	
Round 4
0	Atsuji Miyahara (JPN)	4-0 ST	16-0	Esa Murtoaro (FIN)	2
0	Alexander Ignatenko (URS)	3.5-0 PS	5:12	Hristo Fliev (BUL)	1
0	Tibor Jankovics (TCH)			Bye	
Round 5
1	Tibor Jankovics (TCH)	0-3 P1	4:23	Alexander Ignatenko (URS)	0
0	Atsuji Miyahara (JPN)	3-1 PP	10-6	Hristo Fliev (BUL)	2
Round 6
2	Tibor Jankovics (TCH)	0-3 P1	3:53	Atsuji Miyahara (JPN)	0
0	Alexander Ignatenko (URS)			Bye	
Round 7
1	Alexander Ignatenko (URS)	1-3 PP	3-4	Atsuji Miyahara (JPN)	0

Wrestler	L	ER	CP
Atsuji Miyahara (JPN)	0	-	19
Alexander Ignatenko (URS)	1	-	14.5
Tibor Jankovics (TCH)	2	6	11
Hristo Fliev (BUL)	2	5	13
Esa Murtoaro (FIN)	2	4	3
Erol Kemah (TUR)	2	3	4
Serge Robert (FRA)	2	3	4
Abdolkarim Kakahaji (IRI)	2	2	2
Edvin-Eduardo Vásquez (GUA)	2	2	0
Jihad Sharif (JOR)	2	2	0
Florentino Tirante (PHI)	2	2	0

==== Group B ====
L		CP	TP		L
Round 1
1	José Marques (POR)	0-4 PA	4:08	Peter Stjernberg (SWE)	0
0	Lee Jae-suk (KOR)	4-0 ST	17-2	Abderrahman Naanaa (MAR)	1
1	Csaba Vadász (HUN)	0-3 PO	0-10	Roman Kierpacz (POL)	0
1	Lamachi Elimu (KEN)	0-4 ST	2-18	Hu Richa (CHN)	0
0	Jon Rønningen (NOR)	3-1 PP	4-1	Shawn Sheldon (USA)	1
Round 2
2	José Marques (POR)	0-4 PA		Lee Jae-suk (KOR)	0
0	Peter Stjernberg (SWE)	3-1 PP	5-3	Abderrahman Naanaa (MAR)	2
1	Csaba Vadász (HUN)	4-0 TF	1:20	Lamachi Elimu (KEN)	2
1	Roman Kierpacz (POL)	1-3 PP	5-6	Jon Rønningen (NOR)	0
0	Hu Richa (CHN)	2-0 P0	4:08	Shawn Sheldon (USA)	2
Round 3
1	Peter Stjernberg (SWE)	1-3 PP	5-7	Lee Jae-suk (KOR)	0
2	Csaba Vadász (HUN)	0-3 PO	0-6	Jon Rønningen (NOR)	0
1	Roman Kierpacz (POL)	3-1 PP	3-1	Hu Richa (CHN)	1
Round 4
2	Peter Stjernberg (SWE)	1-3 PP	2-8	Roman Kierpacz (POL)	1
0	Lee Jae-suk (KOR)	3-0 P1	5:35	Hu Richa (CHN)	2
0	Jon Rønningen (NOR)			Bye	
Round 5
0	Jon Rønningen (NOR)	3-1 PP	5-1	Lee Jae-suk (KOR)	1
1	Roman Kierpacz (POL)			Bye	
Round 6
2	Roman Kierpacz (POL)	1-3 PP	3-4	Lee Jae-suk (KOR)	1
0	Jon Rønningen (NOR)			Bye	

Wrestler	L	ER	CP
Jon Rønningen (NOR)	0	-	12
Lee Jae-suk (KOR)	1	-	18
Roman Kierpacz (POL)	2	6	11
Peter Stjernberg (SWE)	2	4	9
Hu Richa (CHN)	2	4	7
Csaba Vadász (HUN)	2	3	4
Abderrahman Naanaa (MAR)	2	2	1
Shawn Sheldon (USA)	2	2	1
Lamachi Elimu (KEN)	2	2	0
José Marques (POR)	2	2	0

=== Final round ===
	CP	TP	
7th place match
Hristo Fliev (BUL)	3-1 PP	9-3	Peter Stjernberg (SWE)
5th place match
Tibor Jankovics (TCH)	0-3 P1	3:29	Roman Kierpacz (POL)
Bronze medal match
Alexander Ignatenko (URS)	1-3 PP	3-4	Lee Jae-suk (KOR)
Gold medal match
Atsuji Miyahara (JPN)	1-3 PP	7-12	Jon Rønningen (NOR)

== Final standings ==
1. Jon Rønningen (NOR)
2. Atsuji Miyahara (JPN)
3. Lee Jae-suk (KOR)
4. Alexander Ignatenko (URS)
5. Roman Kierpacz (POL)
6. Tibor Jankovics (TCH)
7. Hristo Fliev (BUL)
8. Peter Stjernberg (SWE)
