= Wrestling at the 1984 Summer Olympics – Men's freestyle 52 kg =

Men's freestyle 52 kg at the Games of the XXIII Olympiad
- Venue: Anaheim Convention Center
- Dates: 8–10 August 1984
- Competitors: 17 from 17 nations

Medalists
1st place, gold medalist(s)		Šaban Trstena	Yugoslavia
2nd place, silver medalist(s)		Kim Jong-kyu	South Korea
3rd place, bronze medalist(s)		Yuji Takada	Japan

The Men's Freestyle 52 kg at the 1984 Summer Olympics as part of the wrestling program were held at the Anaheim Convention Center, Anaheim, California.

== Medalists ==
Gold	Šaban Trstena; Yugoslavia
Silver	Kim Jong-kyu; South Korea
Bronze	Yuji Takada; Japan

== Tournament results ==
The wrestlers are divided into 2 groups. The winner of each group decided by a double-elimination system.

Legend

- TF — Won by Fall
- ST — Won by Technical Superiority, 12 points difference
- PP — Won by Points, 1-7 points difference, the loser with points
- PO — Won by Points, 1-7 points difference, the loser without points
- SP — Won by Points, 8-11 points difference, the loser with points
- SO — Won by Points, 8-11 points difference, the loser without points
- P0 — Won by Passivity, scoring zero points
- P1 — Won by Passivity, while leading by 1-7 points
- PS — Won by Passivity, while leading by 8-11 points
- DC — Won by Decision, 0-0 score
- PA — Won by Opponent Injury
- DQ — Won by Forfeit
- DNA — Did not appear
- L — Losses
- ER — Round of Elimination
- CP — Classification Points
- TP — Technical Points

=== Eliminatory round ===
==== Group A ====
L		CP	TP		L
Round 1
0	Iván Garcés (ECU)	4-0 ST	14-2	Lou Wie-ki (TPE)	1
1	Jesmond Giordemaina (MLT)	0-4 ST	0-12	Kim Jong-kyu (KOR)	0
0	Arslan Seyhanlı (TUR)	3.5-.5 SP	14-4	Thierry Bourdin (FRA)	1
1	Fritz Niebler (FRG)	1-3 PP	11-13	Ray Takahashi (CAN)	0
0	Liang Dejin (CHN)			Bye	
Round 2
0	Liang Dejin (CHN)	3-1 PP	16-11	Iván Garcés (ECU)	1
2	Lou Wie-Ki (TPE)	.5-3.5 SP	3-11	Jesmond Giordemaina (MLT)	1
0	Kim Jong-kyu (KOR)	3-1 DC	0-0	Aslan Seyhanlı (TUR)	1
2	Thierry Bourdin (FRA)	1-3 PP	4-5	Fritz Niebler (FRG)	1
0	Ray Takahashi (CAN)			Bye	
Round 3
0	Ray Takahashi (CAN)	3-1 PP	7-3	Liang Dejin (CHN)	1
2	Iván Garcés (ECU)	0-4 TF	1:18	Kim Jong-kyu (KOR)	0
2	Jesmond Giordemaina (MLT)	0-4 ST	0-13	Aslan Seyhanlı (TUR)	1
1	Fritz Niebler (FRG)			Bye	
Round 4
1	Fritz Niebler (FRG)	3.5-0 SO	11-0	Liang Dejin (CHN)	2
1	Ray Takahashi (CAN)	1-3 PP	10-15	Kim Jong-kyu (KOR)	0
1	Aslan Seyhanlı (TUR)			Bye	
Round 5
2	Aslan Seyhanlı (TUR)	1-3 DC	0-0	Ray Takahashi (CAN)	1
2	Fritz Niebler (FRG)	1-3 PP	6-13	Kim Jong-kyu (KOR)	0

Wrestler	L	ER	CP
Kim Jong-kyu (KOR)	0	-	17
Ray Takahashi (CAN)	1	-	10
Aslan Seyhanlı (TUR)	2	5	9.5
Fritz Niebler (FRG)	2	5	8.5
Liang Dejin (CHN)	2	4	4
Iván Garcés (ECU)	2	3	5
Jesmond Giordemaina (MLT)	2	3	3.5
Thierry Bourdin (FRA)	2	2	1.5
Lou Wie-Ki (TPE)	2	2	0.5

==== Group B ====
L		CP	TP		L
Round 1
0	Gary Moores (GBR)	4-0 TF	2:04	Farag Ali (EGY)	1
1	Joe Gonzales (USA)	1-3 PP	3-6	Šaban Trstena (YUG)	0
1	Bernardo Olvera (MEX)	0-4 ST	0-12	Mahabir Singh (IND)	0
0	Yuji Takada (JPN)	4-0 TF	1:27	Talla Diaw (SEN)	1
Round 2
1	Garry Moores (GBR)	0-4 TF	2:14	Joe Gonzales (USA)	1
2	Farag Aly (EGY)	0-4 TF	2:14	Šaban Trstena (YUG)	0
2	Bernardo Olvera (MEX)	0-4 ST	0-12	Yuji Takada (JPN)	0
0	Mahabir Singh (IND)	4-0 TF	5:09	Talla Diaw (SEN)	2
Round 3
2	Garry Moores (GBR)	0-4 TF	1:59	Šaban Trstena (YUG)	0
2	Joe Gonzales (USA)	0-4 TF	0:58	Mahabir Singh (IND)	0
0	Yuji Takada (JPN)			Bye	
Final
	Yuji Takada (JPN)	1-3 DC	0-0	Šaban Trstena (YUG)	
	Mahabir Singh (IND)	0-4 ST	2-14	Yuji Takada (JPN)	
	Šaban Trstena (YUG)	4-0 TF	1:13	Mahabir Singh (IND)	

Wrestler	L	ER	CP	Final
Šaban Trstena (YUG)	0	-	11	8
Yuji Takada (JPN)	0	-	8	3
Mahabir Singh (IND)	0	-	12	1
Joe Gonzales (USA)	2	3	5	
Garry Moores (GBR)	2	3	4	
Farag Aly (EGY)	2	2	0	
Bernardo Olvera (MEX)	2	2	0	
Talla Diaw (SEN)	2	2	0	

=== Final round ===
	CP	TP	
5th place match
Aslan Seyhanlı (TUR)	3.5-.5 SP	14-5	Mahabir Singh (IND)
Bronze medal match
Ray Takahashi (CAN)	0-4 ST	0-12	Yuji Takada (JPN)
Gold medal match
Kim Jong-kyu (KOR)	0-4 PA		Šaban Trstena (YUG)

== Final standings ==
1. Šaban Trstena (YUG)
2. Kim Jong-kyu (KOR)
3. Yuji Takada (JPN)
4. Ray Takahashi (CAN)
5. Aslan Seyhanlı (TUR)
6. Mahabir Singh (IND)
7. Fritz Niebler (FRG)
8. Liang Dejin (CHN)
