= Wrestling at the 1988 Summer Olympics – Men's freestyle 57 kg =

Men's freestyle 57 kg at the Games of the XXIV Olympiad
- Venue: Sangmu Gymnasium
- Dates: 29 September–1 October 1988
- Competitors: 25 from 25 nations

Medalists
1st place, gold medalist(s)		Sergei Beloglazov	Soviet Union
2nd place, silver medalist(s)		Askari Mohammadian	Iran
3rd place, bronze medalist(s)		Noh Kyung-Sun	South Korea

The Men's Freestyle 57 kg at the 1988 Summer Olympics as part of the wrestling program were held at the Sangmu Gymnasium, Seongnam.

== Medalists ==
Gold	Sergei Beloglazov; Soviet Union
Silver	Askari Mohammadian; Iran
Bronze	Noh Kyung-Sun; South Korea

== Tournament results ==
The wrestlers are divided into 2 groups. The winner of each group decided by a double-elimination system.

Legend

- TF — Won by Fall
- SP — Won by Superiority, 12-14 points difference, the loser with points
- SO — Won by Superiority, 12-14 points difference, the loser without points
- ST — Won by Technical Superiority, 15 points difference
- PP — Won by Points, the loser with technical points
- PO — Won by Points, the loser without technical points
- P0 — Won by Passivity, scoring zero points
- P1 — Won by Passivity, while leading by 1-11 points
- PS — Won by Passivity, while leading by 12-14 points
- PA — Won by Opponent Injury
- DQ — Won by Forfeit
- DNA — Did not appear
- L — Losses
- ER — Round of Elimination
- CP — Classification Points
- TP — Technical Points

=== Eliminatory round ===
==== Group A ====
L		CP	TP		L
Round 1
0	Barry Davis (USA)	3-1 PP	11-2	Jozef Schwendtner (TCH)	1
0	Béla Nagy (HUN)	4-0 TF	0:39	Vinod Kumar (IND)	1
0	Lawrence Holmes (CAN)	3-1 PP	4-3	Dariusz Grzywiński (POL)	1
0	Sergei Beloglazov (URS)	3-1 PP	4-1	Jürgen Scheibe (FRG)	1
1	David Ogden (GBR)	0-4 ST	0-17	Ryo Kanehama (JPN)	0
0	Muhammad Azeem (PAK)	3-0 P1	4:35	Georg-Josef Auer (AUT)	1
0	Ahmet Ak (TUR)			Bye	
Round 2
0	Ahmet Ak (TUR)	3-1 PP	11-5	Barry Davis (USA)	1
2	Jozef Schwendtner (TCH)	1-3 PP	3-6	Béla Nagy (HUN)	0
1	Vinod Kumar (IND)	3-1 PP	6-3	Lawrence Holmes (CAN)	1
2	Dariusz Grzywiński (POL)	0-4 TF	1:31	Sergei Beloglazov (URS)	0
1	Jürgen Scheibe (FRG)	3-1 PP	14-3	David Ogden (GBR)	2
0	Ryo Kanehama (JPN)	3-1 PP	9-6	Muhammad Azeem (PAK)	1
1	Georg-Josef Auer (AUT)			Bye	
Round 3
2	Georg-Josef Auer (AUT)	0-4 ST	0-15	Ahmet Ak (TUR)	0
2	Barry Davis (USA)	0-4 TF	2:00	Béla Nagy (HUN)	0
2	Vinod Kumar (IND)	0-4 TF	1:44	Sergei Beloglazov (URS)	0
1	Lawrence Holmes (CAN)	3-1 PP	8-6	Jürgen Scheibe (FRG)	2
0	Ryo Kanehama (JPN)			Bye	
1	Muhammad Azeem (PAK)			DNA	
Round 4
1	Ryo Kanehama (JPN)	1-3 PP	4-5	Ahmet Ak (TUR)	0
0	Béla Nagy (HUN)	4-0 TF	2:40	Lawrence Holmes (CAN)	2
0	Sergei Beloglazov (URS)			Bye	
Round 5
0	Sergei Beloglazov (URS)	4-0 TF	2:04	Ryo Kanehama (JPN)	2
0	Ahmet Ak (TUR)	3-1 PP	11-4	Béla Nagy (HUN)	1
Round 6
0	Sergei Beloglazov (URS)	3-1 PP	12-3	Ahmet Ak (TUR)	1
1	Béla Nagy (HUN)			Bye	
Round 7
2	Béla Nagy (HUN)	0-4 TF	1:06	Sergei Beloglazov (URS)	0
1	Ahmet Ak (TUR)			Bye	

Wrestler	L	ER	CP
Sergei Beloglazov (URS)	0	-	22
Ahmet Ak (TUR)	1	-	14
Béla Nagy (HUN)	2	7	16
Ryo Kanehama (JPN)	2	5	8
Lawrence Holmes (CAN)	2	4	7
Jürgen Scheibe (FRG)	2	3	5
Barry Davis (USA)	2	3	4
Vinod Kumar (IND)	2	3	3
Georg-Josef Auer (AUT)	2	3	0
Muhammad Azeem (PAK)	1	2	4
Jozef Schwendtner (TCH)	2	2	2
David Ogden (GBR)	2	2	1
Dariusz Grzywiński (POL)	2	2	1

==== Group B ====
L		CP	TP		L
Round 1
1	Jorge Olvera (MEX)	1-3 PP	1-11	Zoran Šorov (YUG)	0
1	Jesmond Giordemaina (MLT)	0-4 ST	1-16	Noh Kyung-Sun (KOR)	0
1	Khaltmaagiin Battuul (MGL)	0-4 TF	2:47	Askari Mohammadian (IRI)	0
0	Mourad Zelfani (TUN)	4-0 ST	18-0	Waruingi Kimani (KEN)	1
1	Chen Yongliang (CHN)	0-4 ST	1-17	Valentin Ivanov (BUL)	0
0	Brent Hollamby (NZL)	3-1 PP	12-4	Ramón Meña (PAN)	1
Round 2
1	Jorge Olvera (MEX)	3-1 PP	10-5	Jesmond Giordemaina (MLT)	2
1	Zoran Šorov (YUG)	1-3 PP	5-9	Noh Kyung-Sun (KOR)	0
1	Khaltmaa Battuul (MGL)	4-0 ST	15-0	Mourad Zelfani (TUN)	1
0	Askari Mohammadian (IRI)	4-0 ST	15-0	Waruingi Kimani (KEN)	2
1	Chen Yongliang (CHN)	3-1 PP	14-4	Brent Hollamby (NZL)	1
0	Valentin Ivanov (BUL)	4-0 TF	2:09	Ramón Meña (PAN)	2
Round 3
2	Jorge Olvera (MEX)	0-4 ST	3-19	Noh Kyung-Sun (KOR)	0
2	Zoran Šorov (YUG)	1-3 PP	1-9	Khaltmaa Battuul (MGL)	1
0	Askari Mohammadian (IRI)	4-0 TF	1:57	Chen Yongliang (CHN)	2
2	Mourad Zelfani (TUN)	0-4 TF	1:04	Valentin Ivanov (BUL)	0
1	Brent Hollamby (NZL)			Bye	
Round 4
2	Brent Hollamby (NZL)	0-4 ST	4-19	Khaltmaa Battuul (MGL)	1
1	Noh Kyung-Sun (KOR)	0-4 ST	1-16	Askari Mohammadian (IRI)	0
0	Valentin Ivanov (BUL)			Bye	
Round 5
1	Valentin Ivanov (BUL)	1-3 PP	4-5	Askari Mohammadian (IRI)	0
1	Noh Kyung-Sun (KOR)	3-1 PP	6-4	Khaltmaa Battuul (MGL)	2
Round 6
2	Valentin Ivanov (BUL)	1-3 PP	5-7	Noh Kyung-Sun (KOR)	1
0	Askari Mohammadian (IRI)			Bye	

Wrestler	L	ER	CP
Askari Mohammadian (IRI)	0	-	19
Noh Kyung-Sun (KOR)	1	-	17
Valentin Ivanov (BUL)	2	6	14
Khaltmaa Battuul (MGL)	2	5	12
Brent Hollamby (NZL)	2	4	4
Zoran Šorov (YUG)	2	3	5
Mourad Zelfani (TUN)	2	3	4
Jorge Olvera (MEX)	2	3	4
Chen Yongliang (CHN)	2	3	3
Jesmond Giordemaina (MLT)	2	2	1
Ramón Meña (PAN)	2	2	1
Waruingi Kimani (KEN)	2	2	0

=== Final round ===
	CP	TP	
7th place match
Ryo Kanehama (JPN)	1-3 PP	3-4	Khaltmaa Battuul (MGL)
5th place match
Béla Nagy (HUN)	1-3 PP	3-5	Valentin Ivanov (BUL)
Bronze medal match
Ahmet Ak (TUR)	1-3 PP	8-9	Noh Kyung-Sun (KOR)
Gold medal match
Sergei Beloglazov (URS)	3-1 PP	5-1	Askari Mohammadian (IRI)

== Final standings ==
1. Sergei Beloglazov (URS)
2. Askari Mohammadian (IRI)
3. Noh Kyung-Sun (KOR)
4. Ahmet Ak (TUR)
5. Valentin Ivanov (BUL)
6. Béla Nagy (HUN)
7. Khaltmaa Battuul (MGL)
8. Ryo Kanehama (JPN)
