= Wrestling at the 1984 Summer Olympics – Men's Greco-Roman 52 kg =

Men's Greco-Roman 52 kg at the Games of the XXIII Olympiad
- Venue: Anaheim Convention Center
- Dates: 31 July–2 August 1984
- Competitors: 12 from 12 nations

Medalists
1st place, gold medalist(s)		Atsuji Miyahara	Japan
2nd place, silver medalist(s)		Daniel Aceves	Mexico
3rd place, bronze medalist(s)		Bang Dae-Du	South Korea

The Men's Greco-Roman 52 kg at the 1984 Summer Olympics as part of the wrestling program were held at the Anaheim Convention Center, Anaheim, California.

== Medalists ==
Gold	Atsuji Miyahara; Japan
Silver	Daniel Aceves; Mexico
Bronze	Bang Dae-Du; South Korea

== Tournament results ==
The wrestlers are divided into 2 groups. The winner of each group decided by a double-elimination system.

Legend

- TF — Won by Fall
- ST — Won by Technical Superiority, 12 points difference
- PP — Won by Points, 1-7 points difference, the loser with points
- PO — Won by Points, 1-7 points difference, the loser without points
- SP — Won by Points, 8-11 points difference, the loser with points
- SO — Won by Points, 8-11 points difference, the loser without points
- P0 — Won by Passivity, scoring zero points
- P1 — Won by Passivity, while leading by 1-7 points
- PS — Won by Passivity, while leading by 8-11 points
- DC — Won by Decision, 0-0 score
- PA — Won by Opponent Injury
- DQ — Won by Forfeit
- DNA — Did not appear
- L — Losses
- ER — Round of Elimination
- CP — Classification Points
- TP — Technical Points

=== Eliminatory round ===
==== Group A ====
L		CP	TP		L
Round 1
0	Atsuji Miyahara (JPN)	3-0 P1	3:52	Mihai Cișmaș (ROU)	1
1	Jean-Pierre Chambellan (FRA)	0-4 ST	0-12	Bang Dae-Du (KOR)	0
0	Jon Rønningen (NOR)	4-0 ST	12-0	Anders Bükk (SWE)	1
Round 2
0	Atsuji Miyahara (JPN)	4-0 ST	12-0	Jean-Pierre Chambellan (FRA)	2
1	Mihai Cișmaș (ROU)	3-1 PP	5-3	Jon Rønningen (NOR)	1
0	Bang Dae-Du (KOR)	4-0 ST	13-0	Anders Bükk (SWE)	2
Round 3
0	Atsuji Miyahara (JPN)	3-1 PP	12-10	Jon Rønningen (NOR)	2
2	Mihai Cișmaș (ROU)	1-3 PP	12-15	Bang Dae-Du (KOR)	0
Final
	Atsuji Miyahara (JPN)	3-1 PP	15-11	Bang Dae-Du (KOR)	

Wrestler	L	ER	CP	Final
Atsuji Miyahara (JPN)	0	-	10	3
Bang Dae-Du (KOR)	0	-	11	1
Jon Rønningen (NOR)	2	3	6	
Mihai Cișmaș (ROU)	2	3	4	
Anders Bükk (SWE)	2	2	0	
Jean-Pierre Chambellan (FRA)	2	2	0	

==== Group B ====
L		CP	TP		L
Round 1
0	Taisto Halonen (FIN)	4-0 ST	12-0	Iván Garcés (ECU)	1
1	Mahmoud Moustafa Fathalla (EGY)	0-4 ST	1-13	Hu Richa (CHN)	0
1	Daniel Aceves (MEX)	0-3 P1	4:51	Erol Kemah (TUR)	0
Round 2
0	Taisto Halonen (FIN)	3-0 P1	4:50	Mahmoud Fathalla (EGY)	2
2	Iván Garcés (ECU)	0-4 ST	2-14	Daniel Aceves (MEX)	1
0	Hu Richa (CHN)	3.5-.5 SP	14-4	Erol Kemah (TUR)	1
Round 3
0	Taisto Halonen (FIN)	3-1 PP	9-2	Erol Kemah (TUR)	2
1	Hu Richa (CHN)	1-3 PP	8-14	Daniel Aceves (MEX)	1
Final
	Hu Richa (CHN)	1-3 PP	8-14	Daniel Aceves (MEX)	
	Taisto Halonen (FIN)	1-3 PP	11-12	Hu Richa (CHN)	
	Daniel Aceves (MEX)	3-1 PP	9-9	Taisto Halonen (FIN)	

Wrestler	L	ER	CP	Final
Daniel Aceves (MEX)	1	-	7	6
Hu Richa (CHN)	1	-	8.5	4
Taisto Halonen (FIN)	0	-	10	2
Erol Kemah (TUR)	2	3	4.5	
Iván Garcés (ECU)	2	2	0	
Mahmoud Fathalla (EGY)	2	2	0	

=== Final round ===
	CP	TP	
5th place match
Jon Rønningen (NOR)	4-0 ST	14-0	Taisto Halonen (FIN)
Bronze medal match
Bang Dae-Du (KOR)	4-0 ST	13-1	Hu Richa (CHN)
Gold medal match
Atsuji Miyahara (JPN)	3-1 PP	9-4	Daniel Aceves (MEX)

== Final standings ==
1. Atsuji Miyahara (JPN)
2. Daniel Aceves (MEX)
3. Bang Dae-Du (KOR)
4. Hu Richa (CHN)
5. Jon Rønningen (NOR)
6. Taisto Halonen (FIN)
7. Erol Kemah (TUR)
8. Mihai Cișmaș (ROU)
