= Wrestling at the 1976 Summer Olympics – Men's freestyle 52 kg =

Men's freestyle 52 kg at the Games of the XXI Olympiad
- Venue: Maurice Richard Arena
- Dates: 27–31 July 1976
- Competitors: 19 from 19 nations

Medalists
1st place, gold medalist(s)		Yuji Takada	Japan
2nd place, silver medalist(s)		Alexander Ivanov	Soviet Union
3rd place, bronze medalist(s)		Jeon Hae-Sup	South Korea

The Men's Freestyle 52 kg at the 1976 Summer Olympics as part of the wrestling program were held at the Maurice Richard Arena.

== Medalists ==
Gold	Yuji Takada; Japan
Silver	Alexander Ivanov; Soviet Union
Bronze	Jeon Hae-Sup; South Korea

== Tournament results ==
The competition used a form of negative points tournament, with negative points given for any result short of a fall. Accumulation of 6 negative points eliminated the loser wrestler. When only three wrestlers remain, a special final round is used to determine the order of the medals.

Legend

- TF — Won by Fall
- IN — Won by Opponent Injury
- DQ — Won by Passivity
- D1 — Won by Passivity, the winner is passive too
- D2 — Both wrestlers lost by Passivity
- FF — Won by Forfeit
- DNA — Did not appear
- TPP — Total penalty points
- MPP — Match penalty points

Penalties

- 0 — Won by Fall, Technical Superiority, Passivity, Injury and Forfeit
- 0.5 — Won by Points, 8-11 points difference
- 1 — Won by Points, 1-7 points difference
- 2 — Won by Passivity, the winner is passive too
- 3 — Lost by Points, 1-7 points difference
- 3.5 — Lost by Points, 8-11 points difference
- 4 — Lost by Fall, Technical Superiority, Passivity, Injury and Forfeit

=== Round 1 ===
TPP	MPP		Score		MPP	TPP
0	0	Władysław Stecyk (POL)	DQ / 8:30	Jamsrangiin Mönkh-Ochir (MGL)	4	4
0	0	Yuji Takada (JPN)	TF / 1:10	Gordon Bertie (CAN)	4	4
3	3	Kamil Özdağ (TUR)	6 - 8	Nermedin Selimov (BUL)	1	1
4	4	Eloy Abreu (CUB)	DQ / 7:47	Alexander Ivanov (URS)	0	0
0.5	0.5	James Haines (USA)	13 - 3	Constantin Măndilă (ROU)	3.5	3.5
1	1	Li Bong-sun (PRK)	21 - 16	Diego Lo Brutto (FRA)	3	3
4	4	Fritz Niebler (FRG)	TF / 5:55	Henrik Gál (HUN)	0	0
4	4	Habib Fatah-Gharalar (IRI)	TF / 8:55	Jeon Hae-Sup (KOR)	0	0
0	0	Giuseppe Bognanni (ITA)	TF / 4:59	Emille Kitnurse (ISV)	4	4
0		Julien Mewis (BEL)		Bye		

=== Round 2 ===
TPP	MPP		Score		MPP	TPP
4	4	Julien Mewis (BEL)	TF / 1:26	Władysław Stecyk (POL)	0	0
0	0	Yuji Takada (JPN)	TF / 1:15	Kamil Özdağ (TUR)	4	7
7.5	3.5	Gordon Bertie (CAN)	3 - 11	Nermedin Selimov (BUL)	0.5	1.5
5	1	Eloy Abreu (CUB)	13 - 12	James Haines (USA)	3	3.5
0	0	Alexander Ivanov (URS)	22 - 4	Constantin Măndilă (ROU)	4	7.5
1	0	Li Bong-Sun (PRK)	TF / 4:58	Fritz Niebler (FRG)	4	8
7	4	Diego Lo Brutto (FRA)	TF / 7:29	Henrik Gál (HUN)	0	0
4	0	Habib Fattahi (IRI)	24 - 2	Giuseppe Bognanni (ITA)	4	4
0	0	Jeon Hae-Sup (KOR)	TF / 1:30	Emille Kitnurse (ISV)	4	8
4		Jamsrangiin Mönkh-Ochir (MGL)		DNA		

=== Round 3 ===
TPP	MPP		Score		MPP	TPP
8	4	Julien Mewis (BEL)	TF / 1:16	Yuji Takada (JPN)	0	0
1	1	Władysław Stecyk (POL)	11 - 8	Nermedin Selimov (BUL)	3	4.5
6	1	Eloy Abreu (CUB)	16 - 12	Li Bong-Sun (PRK)	3	4
0.5	0.5	Alexander Ivanov (URS)	18 - 10	James Haines (USA)	3.5	7
0	0	Henrik Gál (HUN)	TF / 5:04	Habib Fattahi (IRI)	4	8
0	0	Jeon Hae-Sup (KOR)	TF / 2:16	Giuseppe Bognanni (ITA)	4	8

=== Round 4 ===
TPP	MPP		Score		MPP	TPP
5	4	Władysław Stecyk (POL)	TF / 5:39	Yuji Takada (JPN)	0	0
5.5	1	Nermedin Selimov (BUL)	9 - 9	Eloy Abreu (CUB)	3	9
1.5	1	Alexander Ivanov (URS)	22 - 19	Li Bong-Sun (PRK)	3	7
3	3	Henrik Gál (HUN)	8 - 15	Jeon Hae-Sup (KOR)	1	1

=== Round 5 ===
TPP	MPP		Score		MPP	TPP
9	4	Władysław Stecyk (POL)	5 - 26	Alexander Ivanov (URS)	0	1.5
0	0	Yuji Takada (JPN)	TF / 1:54	Henrik Gál (HUN)	4	7
8.5	3	Nermedin Selimov (BUL)	3 - 10	Jeon Hae-Sup (KOR)	1	2

=== Final ===
Results from the preliminary round are carried forward into the final (shown in yellow).

TPP	MPP		Score		MPP	TPP
	0.5	Yuji Takada (JPN)	20 - 11	Alexander Ivanov (URS)	3.5	
	4	Jeon Hae-Sup (KOR)	TF / 1:46	Yuji Takada (JPN)	0	0.5
3.5	0	Alexander Ivanov (URS)	TF / 2:53	Jeon Hae-Sup (KOR)	4	8

== Final standings ==
1. Yuji Takada (JPN)
2. Alexander Ivanov (URS)
3. Jeon Hae-Sup (KOR)
4. Henrik Gál (HUN)
5. Nermedin Selimov (BUL)
6. Władysław Stecyk (POL)
7. Li Bong-Sun (PRK)
8. Eloy Abreu (CUB)
