= North Korea at the 1976 Summer Olympics =

- IOC code: PRK
- NOC: Olympic Committee of the Democratic People's Republic of Korea

in Montreal
- Competitors: 38 in 8 sports
- Flag bearer: Kim Man-dok
- Medals Ranked 21st: Gold 1 Silver 1 Bronze 0 Total 2

Summer Olympics appearances (overview)
- 1972; 1976; 1980; 1984–1988; 1992; 1996; 2000; 2004; 2008; 2012; 2016; 2020; 2024; 2028

North Korea competed as the Democratic People's Republic of Korea at the 1976 Summer Olympics in Montreal, Quebec, Canada.

== Medalists ==
=== Gold ===
- Gu Yong-ju — Boxing, Men's Bantamweight (– 54 kg)

=== Silver ===
- Ri Byong-uk — Boxing, Men's Light Flyweight (– 48 kg)

== Results by event ==
=== Archery ===
1976 was the first time that North Korea competed in archery in the Olympics. Two women competed, taking 4th and 10th place to put North Korea at fifth place in the archery national leaderboard.

Women's Individual Competition:

- Jang Sun-yong – 2405 points (→ 4th place)
- Han Sun-hi – 2347 points (→ 10th place)

=== Athletics ===
Men's Marathon

- Choe Chang-sop — 2:16:33 (→ 12th place)
- Kim Chang-son — 2:27:38 (→ 44th place)
- Goh Chun-son — 2:31:54 (→ 52nd place)

=== Boxing ===
Men's Light Flyweight (– 48 kg)

- Ri Byong-uk
  1. First Round – Defeated Sidney McKnight (CAN), KO-1
  2. Second Round – Defeated Henryk Średnicki (POL), 3:2
  3. Quarterfinals – Defeated Armando Guevara (VEN), 3:2
  4. Semifinals – Defeated Payao Pooltarat (THA), RSC-2
  5. Final – Lost to Jorge Hernández (CUB), 1:4 → Silver Medal

Men's Flyweight (– 51 kg)

- Jong Jo-ung
  1. First Round — Bye
  2. Second Round — Defeated Joachim Schür (FRG), RSC-2
  3. Third Round — Defeated Vicente Rodríguez (ESP), 3:2
  4. Quarterfinal — Lost to David Torosyan (URS), 0:5

=== Wrestling ===
Men's freestyle 48 kg

- Li Yong-nam
  1. First Round — Defeated Kim Hwa-kyung (KOR), 10 - 11
  2. Second Round — Defeated Claudio Pollio (ITA), 35 - 7
  3. Third Round — Lost to Sobhan Rouhi (IRI), 14 - 13
  4. Fourth Round — Bye
  5. Fifth Round — Lost to Akira Kudo (JPN), 2 - 16 → 6th place

Men's freestyle 52 kg

- Li Bong-sun
  1. First Round — Defeated Diego Lo Brutto (FRA), 21 - 16
  2. Second Round — Defeated Fritz Niebler (GER), 4:58 (won by fall)
  3. Third Round — Lost to Eloy Abreu (CUB), 16 - 12
  4. Fourth Round — Lost to Aleksandr Ivanov (URS), 22 - 19 → 7th place

Men's freestyle 57 kg

- Li Ho-pyong
  1. First Round Lost to Vladimir Yumin (URS), 20 - 5
  2. Second Round Bye
  3. Third Round Defeated Zbigniew Żedzicki (POL), 13 - 10
  4. Fourth Round Lost to Masao Arai (JPN), 7 - 18
