= Wrestling at the 1983 Mediterranean Games =

Wrestling competition

- Dates: 5–9 September 1983

The wrestling tournament at the 1983 Mediterranean Games was held in Casablanca, Morocco.

== Medal table ==
* Host nation (Morocco)

Rank	Nation	Gold	Silver	Bronze	Total
1	Turkey	9	0	7	16
2	Yugoslavia	6	5	0	11
3	Italy	3	4	5	12
4	Greece	1	5	1	7
5	France	1	2	4	7
6	Egypt	0	2	1	3
7	Morocco	0	2	0	2
8	Spain	0	0	1	1
8	Tunisia	0	0	1	1
Totals (9 entries)		20	20	20	60

== Medalists ==
=== Men's freestyle ===
Event	Gold	Silver	Bronze
48 kg	Aldo Bova; Italy	Abaz Emini; Yugoslavia	Mustafa Öcal; Turkey
52 kg	Aslan Seyhanlı; Turkey	Zoran Šorov; Yugoslavia	Mansour Douissi; Tunisia
57 kg	Šaban Trstena; Yugoslavia	Jean Pierre Mercader; France	Aslan Yılmaz; Turkey
62 kg	Halit Akgün; Turkey	Antonio La Bruna; Italy	Gérard Sartoro; France
68 kg	Fevzi Şeker; Turkey	Georgios Athanasiadis; Greece	Eric Brulon; France
74 kg	Burhan Sabancıoğlu; Turkey	Georgios Polychronidis; Greece	Gabriele Catalano; Italy
82 kg	Reşit Karabacak; Turkey	Adnan Elezi; Yugoslavia	Luciano Ortelli; Italy
90 kg	Michele Azzola; Italy	Iraklis Deskoulidis; Greece	İsmail Temiz; Turkey
100 kg	Sıtkı Kadiroğlu; Turkey	Gianni Chelucci; Italy	Santiago Morales; Spain
+100 kg	Mehmet Güçlü; Turkey	Prvoslav Ilić; Yugoslavia	Hassan El-Haddad; Egypt

=== Men's Greco-Roman ===
Event	Gold	Silver	Bronze
48 kg	Vincenzo Maenza; Italy	Farag Ali; Egypt	Salih Bora; Turkey
52 kg	Erol Kemah; Turkey	Laslo Zerge; Yugoslavia	Jean-Pierre Chambellan; France
57 kg	Mehmet Karadağ; Turkey	Ali Lachkar; Morocco	Antonino Caltabiano; Italy
62 kg	Stelios Mygiakis; Greece	Domenico Giuffrida; Italy	Gilles Jalabert; France
68 kg	Jean Pierre Mercader; France	Gian Carlo Gritti; Italy	Sümer Koçak; Turkey
74 kg	Karolj Kasap; Yugoslavia	Abdel Aziz Tahir; Morocco	Celal Taşkıran; Turkey
82 kg	Karolj Kopas; Yugoslavia	Dimitrios Thanopoulos; Greece	Aydın Metin; Turkey
90 kg	Čaba Majoroš; Yugoslavia	Jean-François Court; France	Georgios Pozidis; Greece
100 kg	Jožef Tertei; Yugoslavia	Georgios Poikilidis; Greece	Remo Ricciardelli; Italy
+100 kg	Refik Memišević; Yugoslavia	Hassan El-Haddad; Egypt	Antonio La Penna; Italy
