= 1987 Yasar Dogu Tournament =

Yasar Dogu 1987
- Host city: Istanbul, Turkey
- Dates: 13–15 March 1987

The Yasar Dogu Tournament 1987, was a wrestling event held in Istanbul, Turkey between 13 and 15 March 1987. This tournament was held as 15th.

This international tournament includes competition includes competition in men's freestyle wrestling. This ranking tournament was held in honor of the two time Olympic Champion, Yaşar Doğu.

== Medal table ==
Rank	Nation	Gold	Silver	Bronze	Total
1	Turkey	10	6	2	18
2	Hungary	0	2	3	5
3	Czechoslovakia	0	1	1	2
3	Yugoslavia	0	1	1	2
5	Romania	0	0	2	2
6	Syria	0	0	1	1
Totals (6 entries)		10	10	10	30

== Medal overview ==
=== Men's freestyle ===
Event	Gold	Silver	Bronze
48 kg	Mustafa Öcal; Turkey	Ramazan Turgut; Turkey	Avik Raschovan; Romania
52 kg	Aslan Seyhanlı; Turkey	Abaz Emini; Yugoslavia	Biro Laszlo; Hungary
57 kg	Ahmet Ak; Turkey	Metin Kaplan; Turkey	Bela Nagy; Hungary
62 kg	Bedrettin Sevinç; Turkey	Zekai Ertem; Turkey	Ali Eyubi; Yugoslavia
68 kg	Yüksel Dinçer; Turkey	Michael Marusak; Czechoslovakia	Teuve Oktavian; Romania
74 kg	Fevzi Şeker; Turkey	Selahattin Sağan; Turkey	Ertuğrul Çolakoğlu; Turkey
82 kg	Mehmet Turkaya; Turkey	Necmi Gençalp; Turkey	Muhammad Aka; Syria
90 kg	Reşit Karabacak; Turkey	Gabor Toth; Hungary	Ali Bulut; Turkey
100 kg	Ayhan Taşkın; Turkey	Baki Sudakap; Turkey	İstvan Robotka; Hungary
130 kg	Hayri Sezgin; Turkey	Jozef Balla; Hungary	Miroslav Luberda; Czechoslovakia

== Participating nations ==
- Turkey
- Northern Cyprus
- Romania
- Poland
- Hungary
- Czechoslovakia
- Yugoslavia
- Syria
