= Wrestling at the 1990 Goodwill Games =

- Host city: Seattle, US
- Dates: 26–27 July
- Stadium: Hec Edmundson Pavilion

Freestyle wrestling was part of the 1990 Goodwill Games program. The freestyle wrestling tournament was a team championship (but the wrestlers won individual gold, silver and bronze medals).

A total of 82 wrestlers from 8 nations competed at the 1990 Goodwill Games:

- Bulgaria (10);
- Canada (10);
- Japan (10);
- Mongolian People's Republic (10);
- South Korea (10);
- Soviet Union (10);
- Turkey (10);
- United States (10).

== Background ==
According to a results of 1988 Olympic Games, the following countries became the world's top powerhouses for wrestling: USSR, South Korea, Japan, US and Bulgaria.

The USSR national team included the following wrestlers: 1. Gnel Medzhlumyan, 48 kg; 2. Zambalov Sergey, 52 kg; 3. Ruslan Karaev, 57 kg; 4. Stepan Sarkisyan, 62 kg; 5. Arsen Fadzaev, 68 kg; 6. Adlan Varayev, 74 kg; 7. Elmadi Zhabrailov, 82 kg; 8. Makharbek Khadartsev, 90 kg; 9. Andrei Golovko, 100 kg; 10. David Gobejishvili, 100 + kg.

The South Korean national team included the following wrestlers: 1. Kim Jong-Shin, 48 kg; 2. Kim Sun-Hak, 52 kg; 3. Kim Jong-Oh, 57 kg; 4. Shin Sang-Kyu, 62 kg; 5. Park Jang-soon, 68 kg; 6. Park Young-Jin, 74 kg; 7. Lee Dong-Woo, 82 kg; 8. Oh Hyo-Chul, 90 kg; 9. Kim Tae-woo, 100 kg; 10. Jo Byung-eun, 100 + kg.

The Japan national team included the following wrestlers: 1. Hirano Takayoshi, 48 kg; 2. Hideo Sasayama, 52 kg; 3. Toshio Asakura, 57 kg; 4. Takumi Adachi, 62 kg; 5. Kosei Akaishi, 68 kg; 6. Yoshihiko Hara, 74 kg; 7. Kikuchi Takashi, 82 kg; 8. Akaishi Akeo, 90 kg; 9. Manabu Nakanishi, 100 kg; 10. Tamon Honda, 100 + kg.

The US national team included the following wrestler: 1. Cory Baze, 48 kg; 2. Zeke Jones, 52 kg; 3. Joe Melchiore, 57 kg; 4. John Smith, 62 kg; 5. Nate Carr, 68 kg; 6. Rob Koll, 74 kg; 7. Royce Alger, Kenny Monday, 82 kg; 8. James Scherr, 90 kg; 9. Kirk Trost, William Scherr, 100 kg; 10. Bruce Baumgartner, 100 + kg.

The Bulgarian national team included the following wrestlers: 1. Chetov Azet, 48 kg; 2. Valentin Yordanov, 52 kg; 3. Topolov Dimitar, 57 kg; 4. Yankov Vladimir, 62 kg; 5. Petovski Aleksander, 68 kg; 6. Rahmat Sofiadi, 74 kg; 7. Markov Dimitar, 82 kg; 8. Rusev Dragia, 90 kg; 9. Makedonov Petio, 100 kg; 10. Kiril Barbutov, 100 + kg.

== Competition ==
=== Group stage ===
The national teams were divided into two groups:

- Group A: USSR, South Korea, Mongolian People's Republic and Canada;
- Group B: Japan, US, Bulgaria and Turkey.

=== Final round ===
Final round:

- Japan vs Canada – Edgelow Gregory, Adachi Takumi and Kosei Akaishi won the bronze medal. 1981 World and reigning multiple Japan National Champion Toshio Asakura won by points, but was left without a medal (he lost in his group B);
- Turkey vs Mongolian People's Republic – Khaltmaagiin Battuul won the gold medal in the men's freestyle 57 kg;
- USSR vs Bulgaria – World Champion Valentin Yordanov won the gold medal in the men's freestyle 52 kg;
- South Korea vs US – 1988 Olympic bronze medalist Nate Carr won the gold medal in the men's freestyle 68 kg;
- South Korea vs Bulgaria – Park Young-Jin won the gold medal in the men's freestyle 74 kg;
- USSR vs US – John Smith and Makharbek Khadartsev, both Olympic champions in 1988, won their second Goodwill Games gold medals.
- USSR vs Turkey (individual match) - 1989 World Champion Elmadi Zhabrailov won the gold medal in the men's freestyle 82 kg.

=== Medal round ===
The winners of Groups A and B wrestled among themselves for gold and silver medals. They retained the medals even after losing further matches.

In a notable upset:

- journeyman Chris Wilson (Canada) defeated Arsen Fadzaev (USSR) in the men's freestyle 68 kg.
- journeyman Park Young-Jin (South Korea) defeated Adlan Varaev (USSR) in the men's freestyle 74 kg.

== Medal table ==
Rank	Nation	Gold	Silver	Bronze	Total
1	Soviet Union	3	4	2	9
2	United States	3	2	3	8
3	Bulgaria	2	1	1	4
4	South Korea	1	1	0	2
5	Mongolia	1	0	0	1
6	Turkey	0	2	1	3
7	Japan	0	0	2	2
8	Canada	0	0	1	1
Totals (8 entries)		10	10	10	30

== Medal summary ==
=== Men's freestyle ===
Event	Gold	Silver	Bronze
48 kg	Cory Baze; United States	Gnel Medzhlumyan; Soviet Union	İlyas Şükrüoğlu; Turkey
52 kg	Valentin Yordanov; Bulgaria	Zambalov Sergey; Soviet Union	Zeke Jones; United States
57 kg	Khaltmaagiin Battuul; Mongolia	Remzi Musaoğlu; Turkey	Ruslan Karaev; Soviet Union
62 kg	John Smith; United States	Stepan Sarkisyan; Soviet Union	Takumi Adachi; Japan
68 kg	Nate Carr; United States	Park Jang-soon; South Korea	Kosei Akaishi; Japan
74 kg	Park Young-Jin; South Korea	Rahmat Sofiadi; Bulgaria	Adlan Varaev; Soviet Union
82 kg	Elmadi Zhabrailov; Soviet Union	Sebahattin Öztürk; Turkey	Royce Alger; United States
90 kg	Makharbek Khadartsev; Soviet Union	James Scherr; United States	Gregory Edgelow; Canada
100 kg	Makedonov Petio; Bulgaria	Golovko Andrey; Soviet Union	Kirk Trost; United States
+100 kg	David Gobejishvili; Soviet Union	Bruce Baumgartner; United States	Kiril Barbutov; Bulgaria
