= Homenaje a Dos Leyendas (2012) =

Mexican professional wrestling supercard show

- Promotional poster for the event
- Promotion: Consejo Mundial de Lucha Libre
- Date: March 2, 2012
- City: Mexico City, Mexico
- Venue: Arena México
- Attendance: 12,000

Pay-per-view chronology
← Previous; Torneo Nacional de Parejas Increíbles	Next → Torneo Sangre Nueva

Homenaje a Dos Leyendas chronology
← Previous; 2011	Next → 2013

Homenaje a Dos Leyendas (2012) (Spanish for "Homage to Two Legends") was a professional wrestling supercard show event, scripted and produced by Consejo Mundial de Lucha Libre (CMLL; "World Wrestling Council"). The Dos Leyendas show took place on March 2, 2012 in CMLL's main venue, Arena México, Mexico City, Mexico. The event was to honor and remember CMLL founder Salvador Lutteroth, who died in March 1987. Starting in 1999 CMLL honored not just their founder during the show, but also a second lucha libre legend, making it their version of a Hall of Fame event. For the 2012 show CMLL commemorated the life and career of wrestler Bobby Bonales, a major CMLL wrestler from the 1950s and former holder of the NWA World Welterweight Championship.. This was the 14th March show held under the Homenaje a Dos Leyendas name, having previously been known as Homenaje a Salvador Lutteroth from 1996 to 1998.

The main event of the show was a Lucha de Apuestas ("bet match") with both competitors wagering their hair on the outcome of the match. Blue Panther and Negro Casas wrestled to a draw due to a double pin, which lead to the rare outcome of both wrestlers being shaved bald afterwards. The show also hosted the finals of the 2012 National Parejas Incredíbles ("Incredible Pairs") tournament where Atlantis and Mr. Niebla defeated El Terrible and Rush to win the 3-week long tournament.

== Production ==
=== Background ===
Since 1996 the Mexican wrestling company Consejo Mundial de Lucha Libre (Spanish for "World Wrestling Council"; CMLL) has held a show in March each year to commemorate the passing of CMLL founder Salvador Lutteroth who died in March 1987. For the first three years the show paid homage to Lutteroth himself, from 1999 through 2004 the show paid homage to Lutteroth and El Santo, Mexico's most famous wrestler ever and from 2005 forward the show has paid homage to Lutteroth and a different leyenda ("Legend") each year, celebrating the career and accomplishments of past CMLL stars. Originally billed as Homenaje a Salvador Lutteroth, it has been held under the Homenaje a Dos Leyendas ("Homage to two legends") since 1999 and is the only show outside of CMLL's Anniversary shows that CMLL has presented every year since its inception. All Homenaje a Dos Leyendas shows have been held in Arena México in Mexico City, Mexico, which is CMLL's main venue, its "home". Traditionally CMLL holds their major events on Friday Nights, which means the Homenaje a Dos Leyendas shows replace their regularly scheduled Super Viernes show. The 2012 show was the 17th overall Homenaje a Dos Leyendas show.

=== Storylines ===
The Homenaje a Dos Leyendas show featured six professional wrestling matches with different wrestlers involved in pre-existing scripted feuds, plots and storylines. Wrestlers were portrayed as either heels (referred to as rudos in Mexico, those that portray the "bad guys") or faces (técnicos in Mexico, the "good guy" characters) as they followed a series of tension-building events, which culminated in a wrestling match or series of matches.

The storyline culminating in the main event match between Blue Panther and not just Negro Casas but the entire Casas family stretched back to the middle of the previous year as they build towards the Lucha de Apuestas hair vs. hair match between the two. In Lucha Libre the Luchas de Apuestas match is the ultimate payoff to a storyline and more often than not results in the conclusion of the storyline between the two. In late 2011 Blue Panther faced Negro Casas' brother El Felino in a Lucha de Apuestas match as the main event of CMLL's 2011 Sin Piedad (Spanish for "No Mercy") event. The match resulted in El Felino being disqualified for using the Piledriver, a move that causes an immediate disqualification in Lucha Libre. The loss meant that El Felino had to have his hair shaved off as a result. Following the event Negro Casas stepped up to challenge Blue Panther, with the storyline explanation being that he wanted revenge from the "humiliation" of his brother at the hands of Blue Panther. Casas and Panther faced off extensively in the months prior to Homenaje a Dos Leyendas, most often on opposite sides of a six-man tag team match, the most common match form in CMLL. When the two finally wrestled in a one-on-one match the two went to a time limit draw with no clear winner of the match, giving neither man a clear advantage going into the Lucha de Apuestas match. As part of the build up to the event Panther and Casas engaged in a fight during the press conference for the contract signing, an event common in wrestling shows from the United States, but rare in Mexico. Blue Panther was rumored to have been injured during the press conference altercation, putting the main event in question, but ultimately the match took place as scheduled.

The fifth match on the card, filling the semi-main event position was the conclusion of the 2012 version of CMLL's annual Parejas Increíbles Tag Team tournament. The Preliminary rounds of the tournament took place in the weeks leading up to Homenaje a Dos Leyendas, during CMLL's Friday Night Super Viernes show. For the tournament CMLL paired up one Técnico and one Rudo, oftentimes people who were in the middle of a storyline between the two, and have them compete in a Single-elimination tournament. The rivalry was especially a factor in the team of Rush and El Terrible as tension between the two had been building for months leading up to the event. El Terrible had defeated Rush in the finals of another tournament and had won the CMLL World Heavyweight Championship as a result of that victory. Tension was evident during their three qualification matches as they defeated the teams of Delta and Ephesto, Ángel de Oro and Psicosis and finally Marco Corleone and Último Guerrero. Their opponents, Mr. Niebla and Atlantis was in the middle of a series of matches, both six-man tag team matches as well as singles matches that featured both wrestlers at times tearing their opponent's masks apart as part of their heated rivalry. Atlantis had won the previous two tournaments while teaming with Máscara Dorada, but since he had switched to the Técnico side in late 2011 he could not team with Mascara Dorada again and instead had to team with Mr. Niebla much against his will. The due had to defeat the teams of Brazo de Plata and Kraneo, Averno and La Mascara and the team of La Sombra and Mr. Águila to earn their place in the finale.

Three of the remaining four under card matches did not directly stem from any specific ongoing storylines but was put together by the booking team with no real build behind them. Of the four under card matches only the non-title match between former CMLL World Women's Champion Marcela and the then champion Ayumi had a background in ongoing storylines. Ayumi had defeated Marcela to win the title during Marcela's tour of Japan and had come to Mexico to face various CMLL challengers for the title. At Homenaje a Dos Leyendas the current and the former champion would wrestle in a "Lighting Match", a one fall match with a 10-minute time limit. Leading up to the match Marcela commented that a victory would strengthen her claims for a title match.

The fourth match on the card featured the Arena México debut of the wrestling character Diamante Azul ("Blue Diamond"), who up until briefly before the event had wrestled as "Metro" but was now being reintroduced as a new character complete with new name, new color scheme and new mask. The Metro character was a sponsored character, representing a Mexican news paper, which had previously been given to wrestlers before they develop a wrestling character for themselves. This was the 4th person to wrestle as Metro and then be given a new character. The Diamante Azul character was met with some criticism, both because CMLL already had a wrestler called Diamante and it might confuse the fans, but primarily because the mask, color scheme and tights design bore a striking similarity to the legendary Blue Demon and his son Blue Demon Jr.

The opening match featured the first high-profile CMLL show for Namajague, a Japanese wrestler sent to Mexico by New Japan Pro-Wrestling (NJPW) to gain exposure to other styles of wrestling as part of his development. Namajague's mask and character was created for his stint in CMLL, in Japan he wrestled under the name Kyosuke Mikami.

=== Homage to Salvador Lutteroth and Bobby Bonales ===
In September 1933 Salvador Lutteroth González founded Empresa Mexicana de Lucha Libre (EMLL), which would later be renamed Consejo Mundial de Lucha Libre. Over time Lutteroth would become responsible for building both Arena Coliseo in Mexico City and Arena Mexico, which became known as "The Cathedral of Lucha Libre". Over time EMLL became the oldest wrestling promotion in the world, with 2018 marking the 85th year of its existence. Lutteroth has often been credited with being the "father of Lucha Libre", introducing the concept of masked wrestlers to Mexico as well as the Luchas de Apuestas match. Lutteroth died on September 5, 1987. EMLL, late CMLL, remained under the ownership and control of the Lutteroth family as first Salvador's son Chavo Lutteroth and later his grandson Paco Alonso took over ownership of the company.

The life and achievements of Salvador Lutteroth is always honored at the annual Homenaje a Dos Leyenda' show and since 1999 CMLL has also honored a second person, a Leyenda of lucha libre, in some ways CMLL's version of their Hall of Fame. For the 2012 show CMLL commemorated the life and career of Bobby Bonales (real name Roberto Aceves; September 25, 1916 – June 26, 1994). Bonales is credited with inventing the Topé Suicida move, where a wrestler dives from the ring, between the top rope to strike an opponent on the floor with a headbutt. In 2009, CMLL honored Bobby Bonales by awarding a trophy, the Copa Bobby Bonales to the wrestler voted the "Best Technical wrestler" for that year. During his career he won the Mexican National Lightweight Championship, the Mexican National Middleweight Championship twice, and the NWA World Welterweight Championship. His most renowned Lucha de Apuestas ("Bet matches") includes a loss to El Murciélago Enmascarado in one of the earliest Lucha de Apuestas in Mexico, and two losses to El Santo. His son, Daniel Aceves is an Olympic medal winner in Greco-Roman wrestling.

== Aftermath ==
Despite comments from both Casas and Blue Panther that their draw was not the end of their rivalry no significant developments took place between the two in the months following Dos Leyendas. Following her non-title victory Marcela was given a CMLL World Women's Championship match a week later on March 9 where she defeated Ayumi to become a three-time champion. The title match was Ayumi's last match in CMLL as she returned to Japan a few days later.

After their infighting cost them the match, Rush and El Terrible kept escalating their storyline, clashing in several high-profile matches including the 2012 Universal Championship tournament as well as a match for the CMLL World Light Heavyweight Championship that RUsh successfully defended and a meeting between the two in the 2012 CMLL Torneo Gran Alternativa tag team tournament. The rivalry escalated to the point where both parties agreed to wager their hair in a Lucha de Apuesta match in the main event of CMLL's 79th Anniversary Show. Rush defeated El Terrible in the main event of the show, ensuring that El Terrible was shaved bald after the match.

== Event ==
No.	Results	Stipulations
1	Misterioso Jr., Namajague and Rey Escorpión defeated Fuego, Titán and Tritón	Best two-out-of-three falls Six-man tag team match
2	Averno and Los Invasores (Mr. Águila and Olímpico) defeated Ángel de Oro, Brazo de Plata and El Valiente	Best two-out-of-three falls six-man lucha libre rules tag team match
3	Marcela defeated Ayumi	Lightning match (One fall, 10 minute time limit)
4	Marco Corleone, Diamante Azul and La Máscara defeated Rey Bucanero, Último Guerrero and Volador Jr.	Best two-out-of-three falls six-man lucha libre rules tag team match
5	Atlantis and Mr. Niebla defeated El Terrible and Rush	Best two-out-of-three falls Tag team match; Finals of the 2012 Parejas Incredíbles Tournament
6	Negro Casas vs. Blue Panther ended in a double-pin draw	Best two-out-of-three falls Lucha de Apuestas hair vs. hair match
