= Kuldeep Singh =

Kuldeep of Kuldip Singh may refer to:

- Kuldeep Singh (cricketer) (born 1997), Filipino cricketer
- Kuldeep Singh (actor) (born 1985), Indian Hindi-language television actor
- Kuldeep Singh (music director) (born 1942), music director for Hindi films and plays
- Kuldeep Singh (wrestler) (born 1966), Indian wrestler
- Kuldip Singh (judge) (born 1932), Indian attorney and Supreme Court judge
- Kuldip Singh (architect) (1934–2020), Indian architect
- Kuldip Singh Chandpuri (1940–2018), Indian Army officer
- Kuldip Singh Gosal (born 1946), Hong Kong-Canadian field hockey player
- Kuldeep Singh, Director General Central Reserve Police Force (CRPF)
