= Bruto =

Bruto may refer to:

== People ==
=== Given name ===
- Bruto Brivonesi (1888–1979), Italian admiral
- Bruto Buozzi (1885–1937), Italian gymnast
- Bruto Castellani (1881–1933), Italian silent film actor
- Bruto Testoni (1891–1949), Italian wrestler

=== Surname ===
- Alfredo Bruto da Costa (1938–2016), Portuguese politician
- Francisco Bruto Da Costa (born 1981), Indian footballer

== Other uses ==
- Ellroy (original Italian name Bruto Gancetto), a character in the Mickey Mouse universe
- El Bruto, a 1953 Mexican drama film
- Giunio Bruto, a 1781 opera seria by Domenico Cimarosa
- "Lindo Pero Bruto", a Latin pop song
- Bruto, brother to Burlo, Bluto and Brutus, characters in the Popeye comic strip

== See also ==
- The Good, the Bad and the Ugly (original Italian name Il buono, il brutto, il cattivo), an Italian western film
- Brutto (disambiguation)
