= Stjernberg =

Stjernberg is a Swedish surname. Notable people with the surname include:

- Peter Stjernberg (born 1970), Swedish wrestler
- Robin Stjernberg (born 1991), Swedish pop singer, songwriter, and producer
- Ingemar Stjernberg (born 1933), Swedish diplomat
