= 1989 Yasar Dogu Tournament =

Wrestling event

Yasar Dogu 1989
- Host city: Istanbul, Turkey
- Dates: 17–18 February 1989

The Yasar Dogu Tournament 1989, was a wrestling event held in Istanbul, Turkey between 18 and 19 January 1989. This tournament was held as 17th.

This international tournament includes competition includes competition in men's freestyle wrestling. This ranking tournament was held in honor of the two time Olympic Champion, Yaşar Doğu.

== Medal table ==
Rank	Nation	Gold	Silver	Bronze	Total
1	Turkey	4	2	3	9
2	United States	2	1	1	4
3	Soviet Union	1	3	1	5
4	East Germany	1	1	1	3
4	Iran	1	1	1	3
6	Romania	1	0	1	2
7	Hungary	0	2	1	3
8	West Germany	0	0	1	1
Totals (8 entries)		10	10	10	30

== Medal overview ==
=== Men's freestyle ===
Event	Gold	Silver	Bronze
48 kg	Romica Rașovan; Romania	Nasser Zeinal Nia; Iran	İlyas Şükrüoğlu; Turkey
52 kg	Aslan Seyhanlı; Turkey	Laszlo Biro; Hungary	Constantin Corduneanu; Romania
57 kg	Abdul Davudov; Soviet Union	İsmail Zurnacı; Turkey	Sergey Smal; Soviet Union
62 kg	John Smith; United States	Zekai Ertem; Turkey	Karsten Polky; East Germany
68 kg	Hodem Emin Reza; Iran	Aziz Mamoev; Soviet Union	Georg Schwabenland; West Germany
74 kg	Fevzi Şeker; Turkey	Packy Iscr; East Germany	Robert Kohl; United States
82 kg	Kevin Jackson; United States	Aleksander Savko; Soviet Union	Erol Yıldırım; Turkey
90 kg	Mehmet Turkaya; Turkey	Gábor Tóth; Hungary	Shamil Abdurakhmanov; Soviet Union
100 kg	Mahmut Demir; Turkey	Kurt Angle; United States	Sandor Kiss; Hungary
130 kg	Andreas Schröder; East Germany	Alexei Medvedev; Soviet Union	Ayhan Taşkın; Turkey

== Participating nations ==
- Turkey
- Romania
- Soviet Union
- Cuba
- Japan
- United States
- Iran
- Poland
- East Germany
- China
- Syria
- West Germany
