= Khaltmaagiin Battuul =

Mongolian wrestler

Personal information
- Nationality: Mongolian
- Born: 3 March 1965 (age 61)

Sport
- Sport: Wrestling
Medal record
Men's freestyle wrestling
Representing Mongolia
World Cup
| Silver medal – second place | 1987 Ulaanbaatar | 57 kg |
Goodwill Games
| Gold medal – first place | 1990 Seattle | 57 kg |

Khaltmaagiin Battuul (born 3 March 1965) is a Mongolian wrestler. He competed in the men's freestyle 57 kg at the 1988 Summer Olympics.

At the 1990 Goodwill Games Khaltmaagiin Battuul won the gold medal in the men's freestyle 57 kg, he defeated the European champion Remzi Musaoğlu 2-1, and two-time World Cup champion Ruslan Karaev 3-0.
