= Brutto =

Brutto may refer to:

- Diego Lo Brutto (born 1953), French wrestler
- Pat LoBrutto (born 1948), American editor, author, and anthologist
- Raffaella Brutto (born 1988), Italian snowboarder
- Brutto mount, Parenti, Calabria
- Brutto (band), Belarusian band formed in 2014

== See also ==
- Bruto (disambiguation)
