= Hollamby =

Hollamby is a surname. Notable people with the surname include:

- Brent Hollamby (born 1964), New Zealand wrestler
- David Hollamby (1945–2016), British Governor of Saint Helena
- Shaun Hollamby (born 1965), British auto racing driver and race team owner
