= Chambellan (surname) =

Chambellan is a surname. Notable people with the surname include:

- Jean-Pierre Chambellan (born 1958), French wrestler
- Rene Paul Chambellan (1893–1955), American sculptor
