= 1990 Yasar Dogu Tournament =

Yasar Dogu 1990
- Host city: Istanbul, Turkey
- Dates: 17–18 February 1991

The Yasar Dogu Tournament 1990, was a wrestling event held in Istanbul, Turkey between 17 and 18 January 1990. This tournament was held as 18th.

This international tournament includes competition includes competition in men's freestyle wrestling. This ranking tournament was held in honor of the two time Olympic Champion, Yaşar Doğu.

== Medal table ==
| Rank | Nation | Gold | Silver | Bronze | Total |
|---|---|---|---|---|---|
| 1 | Turkey | 4 | 6 | 3 | 13 |
| 2 | Soviet Union | 3 | 0 | 3 | 6 |
| 3 | Japan | 2 | 0 | 0 | 2 |
| 4 | United States | 1 | 0 | 0 | 1 |
| 5 | Romania | 0 | 2 | 0 | 2 |
| 6 | Cuba | 0 | 1 | 2 | 3 |
| 7 | Poland | 0 | 1 | 0 | 1 |
| 8 | Iran | 0 | 0 | 2 | 2 |
| Totals (8 entries) | | 10 | 10 | 10 | 30 |

== Medal overview ==
=== Men's freestyle ===
| Event | Gold | Silver | Bronze |
|---|---|---|---|
| 48 kg | İlyas Şükrüoğlu; Turkey | Romica Rasovan; Romania | Aldo Martinez; Cuba |
| 52 kg | Fikret Mutlu; Turkey | Carlos Varela; Cuba | Ahmet Orel; Turkey |
| 57 kg | Ahmet Ak; Turkey | İsmail Zurnacı; Turkey | Sergey Smal; Soviet Union |
| 62 kg | Takumi Adachi; Japan | Danut-Dumitru Prefit; Romania | Hüseyin Öztürk; Turkey |
| 68 kg | Kosei Akaishi; Japan | Fatih Özbaş; Turkey | Behçet Selimoğlu; Turkey |
| 74 kg | Fevzi Şeker; Turkey | Selahattin Yiğit; Turkey | Igor Kozry; Soviet Union |
| 82 kg | Aleksander Savko; Soviet Union | Jozef Niemiec; Poland | Rocabi Kloumars; Iran |
| 90 kg | Shamil Abdurakhmanov; Soviet Union | Efrahim Kamberoğlu; Turkey | Wilfredo Morales; Cuba |
| 100 kg | Arawat Sabejew; Soviet Union | Ali Kayalı; Turkey | Muhammed Jafarhod; Iran |
| 130 kg | Tom Erikson; United States | Sezgin Ayık; Turkey | Alexei Medvedev; Soviet Union |

== Participating nations ==
- Turkey
- Bulgaria
- Romania
- Soviet Union
- Hungary
- Yugoslavia
- Cuba
- Japan
- Poland
- United States
- Iran
