= Tibor Jankovics =

Slovak wrestler

Personal information
- Nationality: Slovak
- Born: 20 September 1960 (age 65) Komárno, Czechoslovakia

Sport
- Sport: Wrestling

Tibor Jankovics (born 20 September 1960) is a Slovak wrestler. He competed in the men's Greco-Roman 52 kg at the 1988 Summer Olympics.
