= Hristo Fliev =

Bulgarian wrestler

Personal information
- Nationality: Bulgarian
- Born: 26 January 1964 (age 62) Dimitrovgrad, Bulgaria

Sport
- Sport: Wrestling

Hristo Fliev (born 26 January 1964) is a Bulgarian former wrestler. He competed in the men's Greco-Roman 52 kg at the 1988 Summer Olympics.
