= Esa Murtoaro =

Finnish wrestler

Personal information
- Nationality: Finnish
- Born: 27 July 1966 (age 59) Helsinki, Finland

Sport
- Sport: Wrestling

Esa Murtoaro (born 27 July 1966) is a Finnish wrestler. He competed in the men's Greco-Roman 52 kg at the 1988 Summer Olympics.
