= Lou Wie-ki =

Taiwanese wrestler

Personal information
- Full name: 羅 文基, Pinyin: Luó Wén-jī
- Nationality: Taiwanese
- Born: 26 May 1965 (age 61)

Sport
- Sport: Wrestling

Lou Wie-ki (born 26 May 1965) is a Taiwanese wrestler. He competed in the men's freestyle 52 kg at the 1984 Summer Olympics.
