= Xu Jihua =

Chinese wrestler

Personal information
- Nationality: Chinese
- Born: 14 September 1966 (age 59)

Sport
- Sport: Wrestling

Xu Jihua (born 14 September 1966) is a Chinese wrestler. He competed in the men's freestyle 52 kg at the 1988 Summer Olympics.
