= James Haines =

American wrestler (born 1954)

Personal information
- Born: October 20, 1954 (age 71) Arcadia, Wisconsin, U.S.

Sport
- Country: United States
- Sport: Wrestling
- Events: Freestyle and Folkstyle
- College team: Wisconsin
- Club: Wisconsin Wrestling Club
- Team: USA
Medal record
Men's freestyle wrestling
Representing the United States
World Championships
| Silver medal – second place | 1979 San Diego | 52 kg |
Pan American Games
| Silver medal – second place | 1975 Mexico City | 52 kg |
Collegiate Wrestling
Representing the Wisconsin Badgers
NCAA Division I Championships
| Gold medal – first place | 1977 Norman | 118 lb |

James "Jim" Haines (born October 20, 1954) is an American wrestler. He competed in the men's freestyle 52 kg at the 1976 Summer Olympics. He won a silver medal at the 1979 World Wrestling Championships at 52 kg. Haines wrestled collegiately at Wisconsin, where he won an NCAA championship.
