= Lo Chao-cheng =

Taiwanese wrestler

Personal information
- Full name: 羅 昭成, Pinyin: Luó Zhāo-chéng
- Nationality: Taiwanese
- Born: 26 April 1969 (age 57)

Sport
- Sport: Wrestling

Lo Chao-cheng (born 26 April 1969) is a Taiwanese wrestler. He competed in the men's freestyle 52 kg at the 1988 Summer Olympics.
