= Yuji Takada (wrestler) =

Japanese wrestler (born 1954)

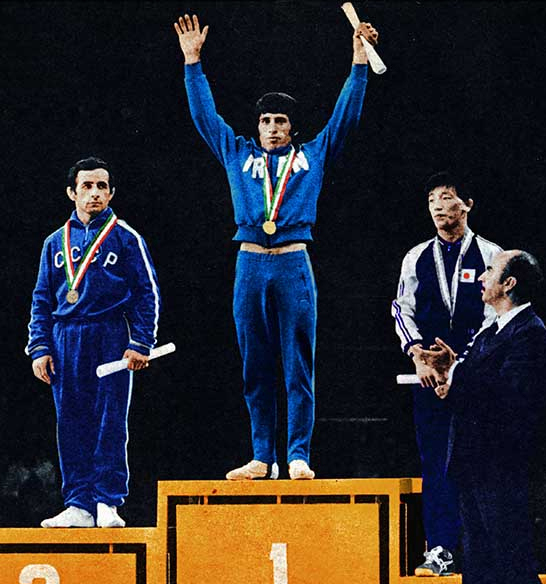
- Takada (right) at the 1973 World Championships

Personal information
- Born: February 17, 1954 (age 72) Ota, Gunma, Japan
- Height: 162 cm (5 ft 4 in)

Sport
- Sport: Freestyle wrestling
Medal record
Men's freestyle wrestling
Representing Japan
Olympic Games
Gold medal – first place	1976 Montreal	52 kg
Bronze medal – third place	1984 Los Angeles	52 kg
World Championships
Gold medal – first place	1974 Istanbul	52 kg
Gold medal – first place	1975 Minsk	52 kg
Gold medal – first place	1977 Lausanne	52 kg
Gold medal – first place	1979 San Diego	52 kg
Bronze medal – third place	1973 Tehran	52 kg
Asian Games
Silver medal – second place	1974 Tehran	52 kg
Gold medal – first place	1978 Bangkok	52 kg

Yuji Takada (高田 裕司, Takada Yūji; born February 17, 1954) is a retired Japanese flyweight freestyle wrestler. He competed at the 1976 and 1984 Olympics and won a gold and a bronze medal, respectively. Takada held the world title in 1974, 1975, 1977 and 1979. In 2005 he was inducted into the FILA Hall of Fame.
