= Anders Bükk =

Swedish wrestler

Personal information
- Nationality: Swedish
- Born: 17 October 1963 (age 63) Gothenburg, Sweden

Sport
- Sport: Wrestling

Anders Bükk (born 17 October 1963) is a Swedish wrestler. He competed in the men's Greco-Roman 52 kg at the 1984 Summer Olympics.
