= Gary Moores =

British wrestler

Personal information
- Nationality: British (English)
- Born: 4 April 1959 (age 67) Manchester, England
- Height: 175 cm (5 ft 9 in)
- Weight: 52 kg (115 lb)

Sport
- Sport: Amateur wrestling
- Club: Barton AWC

Gary Moores (born 4 April 1959) is a British wrestler. He competed in the men's freestyle 52 kg at the 1984 Summer Olympics.

Moores was a two-times winner of the British Wrestling Championships in 1984 and 1985.
