= Emille Kitnurse =

United States Virgin Islands wrestler

Personal information
- Born: October 18, 1958 (age 67)

Sport
- Sport: Wrestling

Emille Kitnurse (born October 18, 1958) is a wrestler who represents the United States Virgin Islands. He competed in the men's freestyle 52 kg at the 1976 Summer Olympics.
