= Fevzi Şeker =

Turkish freestyle wrestler

Personal information
- Born: July 27, 1968 Sivas, Turkey
- Died: 15 November 2011 (aged 49)
- Height: 1.72 m (5 ft 8 in)
- Weight: 74 kg (163 lb; 11.7 st)

Sport
- Country: Turkey
- Sport: Amateur wrestling
- Event: Freestyle
Medal record
Men's freestyle wrestling
Representing Turkey
European Championships
Gold medal – first place	1990 Poznan	68 kg
Silver medal – second place	1983 Budapest	68 kg
Silver medal – second place	1985 Leipzig	68 kg
Bronze medal – third place	1987 Veliko Tarnovo	74 kg
Bronze medal – third place	1989 Ankara	74 kg
World Cup
Silver medal – second place	1990 Toledo	74 kg
Mediterranean Games
Gold medal – first place	1983 Casablanca	68 kg
Gold medal – first place	1987 Latakia	74 kg
Yasar Dogu Tournament
Gold medal – first place	1987 Istanbul	74 kg
Gold medal – first place	1989 Istanbul	74 kg
Gold medal – first place	1990 Istanbul	74 kg
Balkan Games
Silver medal – second place	1979 Yambol	68 kg
Silver medal – second place	1982 Thessaloniki	68 kg
World Juniors Championships
Bronze medal – third place	1981 Vancouver	68 kg

Fevzi Şeker (27 July 1962 – 15 December 2011) was a Turkish wrestler who competed in the 1984 Summer Olympics and in the 1988 Summer Olympics.

== Career ==
He started wrestling in 1974. Born in Sivas in 1962, Fevzi Şeker started wrestling at Istanbul Fatih Wrestling Club in 1974, and continued wrestling at Istanbul Tekel Sports Club, Tofaş SAS Sports Club, Simtel Sports Club, İskenderun Demirçelik Sports Club. His coaches were Servet Meric, Nasuh Akar, Muharrem Atik. In 1981, Fevzi Şeker ranked third in the world in the 68 kg junior freestyle category in Vancouver, Canada, and in 1983 he won the gold medal in the 68 kg freestyle category at the Mediterranean Games in Casablanca, Morocco. In the same year, Fevzi Şeker ranked second in Europe in Budapest in the same weight category, and in the 1984 Los Angeles Olympics, he came 6th in the freestyle 68 kg category.

Fevzi Şeker came second in Europe in 1985, first in the Mediterranean Games in 1987 and third in Europe in 1987 and 1989. In 1990, Fevzi Şeker won the gold medal at the 1990 European Wrestling Championships in Poznan, Poland, and worked as a coach after quitting wrestling.

On December 15, 2011, Şeker, who was in camp with the national team at the wrestling camp training center in Elmadağ as part of the preparations for the European Championship, played a football match with the national team athletes and coaches after the evening training. Fevzi Şeker collapsed during the match and was first treated at Elmadağ Hospital. Şeker was then taken by ambulance to Yüksek İhtisas Hospital, where he could not be saved despite all interventions and died at the age of 49. His grave is in Karşıyaka Cemetery.
