= Herbert Tutsch =

German wrestler (born 1963)

Personal information
- Nationality: German
- Born: 9 February 1963 (age 63) Schorndorf, Germany

Sport
- Sport: Wrestling

Herbert Tutsch (born 9 February 1963) is a German former wrestler. He competed in the men's freestyle 52 kg at the 1988 Summer Olympics.
