= Waruingi Kimani =

Kenyan wrestler (born 1962)

Personal information
- Nationality: Kenyan
- Born: 23 November 1962 (age 63)

Sport
- Sport: Wrestling

Waruingi Kimani (born 23 November 1962) is a Kenyan wrestler. He competed in the men's freestyle 57 kg at the 1988 Summer Olympics.
