= Fayadh Minati =

Iraqi wrestler (born 1966)

Personal information
- Nationality: Iraqi
- Born: 1966 (age 59–60)

Sport
- Sport: Wrestling

Fayadh Minati (born 1966) is an Iraqi wrestler. He competed in the men's freestyle 52 kg at the 1988 Summer Olympics.
