= Joe Gonzales (wrestler) =

American wrestler (born 1957)

Personal information
- Born: October 4, 1957 (age 68) Montebello, California, U.S.

Sport
- Country: United States
- Sport: Wrestling
- Events: Freestyle and Folkstyle
- College team: Cal State Bakersfield
- Club: Sunkist Kids Wrestling Club
- Team: USA
Medal record
Collegiate Wrestling
Representing the Cal State Bakersfield Roadrunners
NCAA Division I Championships
| Gold medal – first place | 1980 Corvallis | 118 lb |
| Silver medal – second place | 1979 Ames | 118 lb |
NCAA Division II Championships
| Gold medal – first place | 1979 Brookings | 118 lb |
| Gold medal – first place | 1980 Omaha | 118 lb |

Joe Gonzales (born October 4, 1957) is an American former wrestler. He competed in the men's freestyle 52 kg at the 1984 Summer Olympics. Gonzales competed collegiately at Cal State Bakersfield, where he as NCAA Division I national champion and two-time finalist and a two-time NCAA Division II national champion. In 2015, he was inducted into the National Wrestling Hall of Fame as a Distinguished Member.
