= Jorge Olvera =

Mexican wrestler (born 1961)

Personal information
- Full name: Jorge Adalberto Olvera González
- Nationality: Mexican
- Born: 12 April 1961 (age 65)
- Height: 161 cm (5 ft 3 in)
- Weight: 57 kg (126 lb)

Sport
- Sport: Wrestling
Medal record
Men's freestyle wrestling
Representing Mexico
Pan American Games
Bronze medal – third place	1979 San Juan	52 kg

Jorge Adalberto Olvera González (born 12 April 1961) is a Mexican wrestler. He competed in the men's freestyle 57 kg at the 1988 Summer Olympics.
