= Mihai Cișmaș =

Romanian wrestler

Personal information
- Nationality: Romanian
- Born: 18 November 1962 (age 63) Piatra Neamț, Romania

Sport
- Sport: Wrestling

Mihai Cișmaș (born 18 November 1962) is a Romanian wrestler. He competed in the men's Greco-Roman 52 kg at the 1984 Summer Olympics.
