= Chen Yongliang =

Chinese wrestler

Personal information
- Nationality: Chinese
- Born: 28 May 1968 (age 58)

Sport
- Sport: Wrestling

Chen Yongliang (born 28 May 1968) is a Chinese wrestler. He competed in the men's freestyle 57 kg at the 1988 Summer Olympics.
