= Wrestling at the 1976 Summer Olympics =

Wrestling at the Games of the XXI Olympiad
- Venue: Centre Pierre Charbonneau
- Dates: 20–31 July
- Competitors: 331 from 41 nations

At the 1976 Summer Olympics in Montreal, 20 wrestling events were contested, all for men only. There were 10 weight classes in each of the freestyle wrestling and Greco-Roman wrestling disciplines.

== Medal summary ==
=== Freestyle ===
Event	Gold	Silver	Bronze
48 kg	Hasan Isaev; Bulgaria	Roman Dmitriev; Soviet Union	Akira Kudo; Japan
52 kg	Yuji Takada; Japan	Alexander Ivanov; Soviet Union	Jeon Hae-sup; South Korea
57 kg	Vladimir Yumin; Soviet Union	Hans-Dieter Brüchert; East Germany	Masao Arai; Japan
62 kg	Yang Jung-mo; South Korea	Zevegiin Oidov; Mongolia	Gene Davis; United States
68 kg	Pavel Pinigin; Soviet Union	Lloyd Keaser; United States	Yasaburo Sugawara; Japan
74 kg	Jiichiro Date; Japan	Mansour Barzegar; Iran	Stanley Dziedzic; United States
82 kg	John Peterson; United States	Viktor Novozhilov; Soviet Union	Adolf Seger; West Germany
90 kg	Levan Tediashvili; Soviet Union	Ben Peterson; United States	Stelică Morcov; Romania
100 kg	Ivan Yarygin; Soviet Union	Russ Hellickson; United States	Dimo Kostov; Bulgaria
+100 kg	Soslan Andiyev; Soviet Union	József Balla; Hungary	Ladislau Şimon; Romania

=== Greco-Roman ===
Event	Gold	Silver	Bronze
48 kg	Alexei Shumakov; Soviet Union	Gheorghe Berceanu; Romania	Stefan Angelov; Bulgaria
52 kg	Vitali Konstantinov; Soviet Union	Nicu Gingă; Romania	Koichiro Hirayama; Japan
57 kg	Pertti Ukkola; Finland	Ivan Frgić; Yugoslavia	Farhat Mustafin; Soviet Union
62 kg	Kazimierz Lipień; Poland	Nelson Davidyan; Soviet Union	László Réczi; Hungary
68 kg	Suren Nalbandyan; Soviet Union	Ștefan Rusu; Romania	Heinz-Helmut Wehling; East Germany
74 kg	Anatoly Bykov; Soviet Union	Vítězslav Mácha; Czechoslovakia	Karl-Heinz Helbing; West Germany
82 kg	Momir Petković; Yugoslavia	Vladimir Cheboksarov; Soviet Union	Ivan Kolev; Bulgaria
90 kg	Valery Rezantsev; Soviet Union	Stoyan Nikolov; Bulgaria	Czesław Kwieciński; Poland
100 kg	Nikolai Balboshin; Soviet Union	Kamen Goranov; Bulgaria	Andrzej Skrzydlewski; Poland
+100 kg	Alexander Kolchinsky; Soviet Union	Aleksandar Tomov; Bulgaria	Roman Codreanu; Romania

== Medal table ==
Rank	Nation	Gold	Silver	Bronze	Total
1	Soviet Union	12	5	1	18
2	Japan	2	0	4	6
3	Bulgaria	1	3	3	7
4	United States	1	3	2	6
5	Yugoslavia	1	1	0	2
6	Poland	1	0	2	3
7	South Korea	1	0	1	2
8	Finland	1	0	0	1
9	Romania	0	3	3	6
10	East Germany	0	1	1	2
10	Hungary	0	1	1	2
12	Czechoslovakia	0	1	0	1
12	Iran	0	1	0	1
12	Mongolia	0	1	0	1
15	West Germany	0	0	2	2
Totals (15 entries)		20	20	20	60

== Participating nations ==
A total of 330 wrestlers from 41 nations competed at the Montreal Games:

- Argentina (3)
- Australia (3)
- Austria (2)
- Belgium (2)
- Bulgaria (20)
- Canada (15)
- Cuba (9)
- Czechoslovakia (5)
- East Germany (12)
- Ecuador (1)
- Finland (7)
- France (5)
- Great Britain (7)
- Greece (4)
- Hungary (18)
- Iran (17)
- Israel (1)
- Italy (8)
- Japan (20)
- Lebanon (1)
- Mexico (2)
- Mongolia (13)
- Morocco (4)
- New Zealand (2)
- North Korea (3)
- Norway (2)
- Pakistan (2)
- Panama (1)
- Poland (14)
- Portugal (3)
- Puerto Rico (5)
- Romania (19)
- Senegal (5)
- South Korea (11)
- Soviet Union (20)
- Sweden (8)
- Turkey (11)
- United States (20)
- Virgin Islands (4)
- West Germany (15)
- Yugoslavia (6)

== Sources ==
- "Olympic Medal Winners". International Olympic Committee.
