= Habib Fatahi =

Iranian wrestler

Habib Fatah-Gharalar
Personal information
- Nationality: Iranian
- Born: 8 December 1948 (age 77)

Sport
- Sport: Wrestling

Habib Fatah-Gharalar (born 8 December 1948) is an Iranian wrestler. He competed in the men's freestyle 52 kg at the 1976 Summer Olympics.
