= Mitsuru Sato =

Japanese freestyle wrestler

Personal information
- Born: 21 December 1961 (age 64) Hachirogata, Akita Prefecture, Japan

Sport
- Sport: Freestyle wrestling
Medal record
Representing Japan
Olympic Games
| Gold medal – first place | 1988 Seoul | 52 kg |
World Championships
| Bronze medal – third place | 1987 Clermont-Ferrand | 52 kg |
Asian Games
| Gold medal – first place | 1986 Seoul | 52 kg |
Summer Universiade
| Gold medal – first place | 1981 Bucharest | 52 kg |

Mitsuru Sato (佐藤 満, Satō Mitsuru; born 21 October 1961) is a Japanese wrestler and Olympic champion in Freestyle wrestling.

== Olympics ==
Sato competed at the 1988 Summer Olympics in Seoul where he received a gold medal in Freestyle wrestling, the flyweight class.
