= Bang Dae-du =

South Korean wrestler (born 1954)

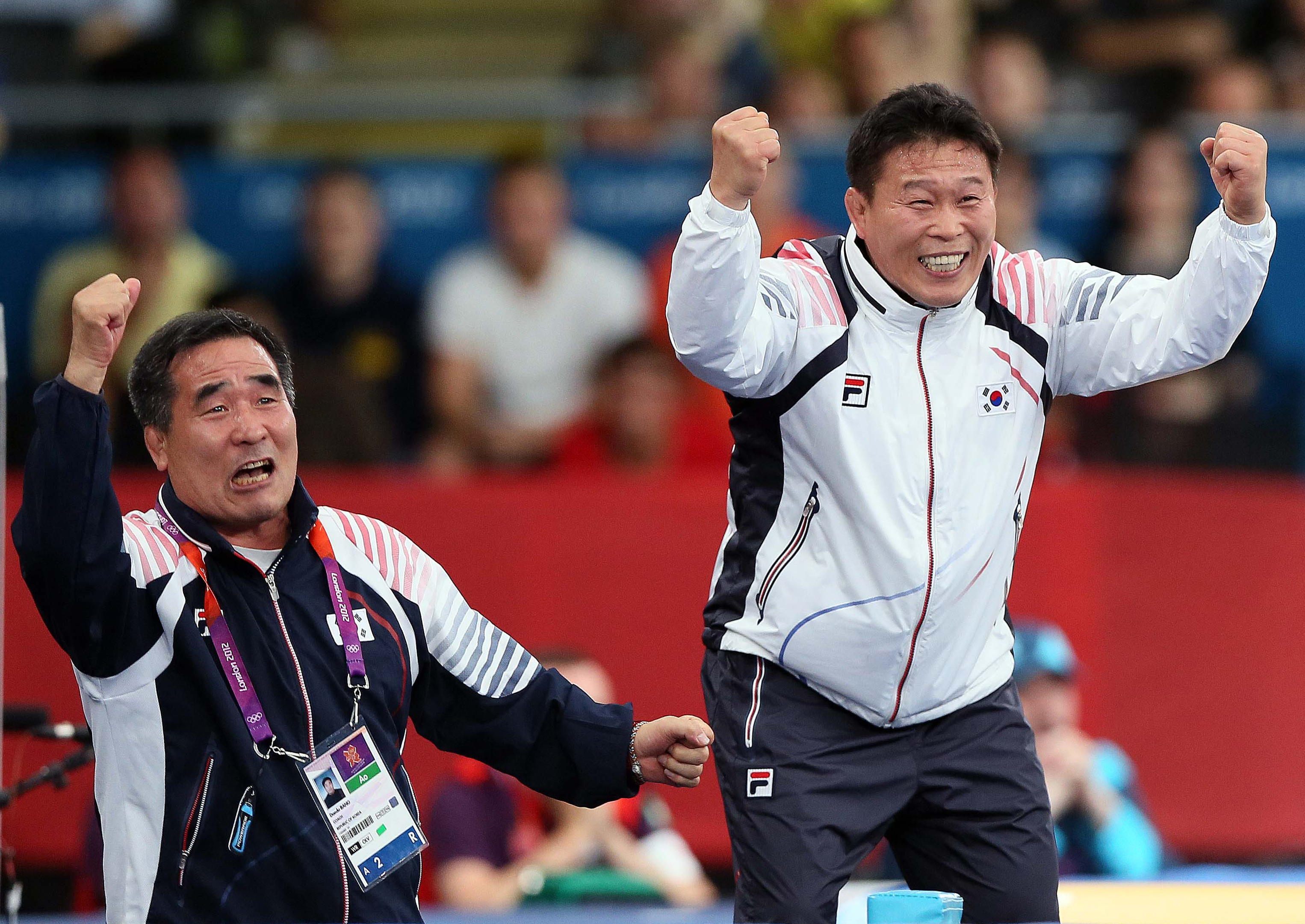
- As coach in the 2012 London Olympics

Personal information
- Native name: 방대두
- National team: South Korea
- Born: October 4, 1954 (age 71)
Medal record
Men's Greco-Roman wrestling
Representing South Korea
Olympic Games
Bronze medal – third place	1984 Los Angeles	Flyweight
World Championships
Bronze medal – third place	1982 Katowice	52 kg
Asian Games
Bronze medal – third place	1974 Tehran	47 kg
Universiade
Bronze medal – third place	1981 Bucharest	52 kg

Korean name
- Hangul: 방대두
- Hanja: 方大斗
- RR: Bang Daedu
- MR: Pang Taedu

Bang Dae-du (Korean: 방대두; Hanja: 方大斗; born October 14, 1954, in Gyeongsan, North Gyeongsang Province) is a retired South Korean Greco-Roman wrestler.

He received a bronze medal at the 1984 Summer Olympics in Los Angeles.
