= Valentin Ivanov (wrestler) =

Bulgarian wrestler

Personal information
- Nationality: Bulgarian
- Born: 25 January 1966 (age 60) Haskovo, Bulgaria

Sport
- Sport: Wrestling

Valentin Ivanov (born 25 January 1966) is a Bulgarian former wrestler. He competed in the men's freestyle 57 kg at the 1988 Summer Olympics.
