= Shaban Trstena =

Macedonian Yugoslavian wrestler (born 1965)

Personal information
- Nationality: North Macedonia; Yugoslavia
- Born: 1 January 1965 (age 61) Skopje, SR Macedonia, SFR Yugoslavia
- Height: 165 cm (5 ft 5 in)

Sport
- Country: Yugoslavia
- Sport: Freestyle Wrestling
- Weight class: 48-52-57 kg
Medal record
Men's freestyle wrestling
Representing Yugoslavia
Olympic Games
Gold medal – first place	1984 Los Angeles	52 kg
Silver medal – second place	1988 Seoul	52 kg
World Championships
Bronze medal – third place	1982 Katowice	48 kg
European Championships
Gold medal – first place	1984 Jönköping	52 kg
Gold medal – first place	1990 Poznan	52 kg
Silver medal – second place	1983 Budapest	52 kg
Silver medal – second place	1985 Leipzig	52 kg
Silver medal – second place	1986 Piraeus	52 kg
Bronze medal – third place	1982 Varna	48 kg
Bronze medal – third place	1988 Manchester	52 kg
Mediterranean Games
Gold medal – first place	1983 Casablanca	57 kg
Gold medal – first place	1987 Latakia	57 kg
Gold medal – first place	1991 Athena	62 kg

Shaban Trstena (Albanian: Shaban Tërstena, Macedonian: Шабан Трстена, romanized: Šaban Trstena; born 1 January 1965) is a Macedonian-Yugoslavian former freestyle wrestler.

Trstena won the gold medal at the 1984 Olympics in Los Angeles and also won the silver medal at the 1988 Olympics in Seoul. Trstena is currently the youngest to win any wrestling gold at the Olympics, being 19 years of age at the Los Angeles Olympics.

He would win in his wrestling career the 1984 European Championship and the 1990 European Wrestling Championship in Poznan. Trstena also won gold beating the then World Champion Valentin Yordanov. Trstena would then win silver in 1983, 1985, 1986, and the bronze in 1982 and 1988.

In the 1982 World Wrestling Championships, Trstena reached bronze. During the three times he competed in the Mediterranean or Balkan Games, he won gold in all three. He has been pronounced the best Macedonian athlete many times and once in 1984 the best athlete of Yugoslavia. Coming from an Albanian background he was also pronounced the best Albanian athlete of the last century in 2000. He has won 715 matches out of 741 fights. He participated in 42 tournaments in the world winning 30 gold medals, the remainder being silver and bronze. At the Atlanta Olympic Games in 1996 he won the fifth place.

Awards
Preceded by Dragutin Šurbek	(Socialist Federal Republic of Yugoslavia) The Best Athlete of Yugoslavia; 1984	Succeeded by Dražen Petrović
