= Josef-Georg Auer =

Austrian wrestler

Personal information
- Nationality: Austrian
- Born: 12 June 1965 (age 61) Abtenau, Austria

Sport
- Sport: Wrestling

Josef-Georg Auer (born 12 June 1965) is an Austrian wrestler. He competed in the men's freestyle 57 kg at the 1988 Summer Olympics.
