= 1987 Wrestling World Cup =

Wrestling World Cup - 1987

- Host city: Ulaanbaatar, Mongolian People's Republic
- Dates: 28–29 November
- Stadium: Central Sports Palace

Champions
- Freestyle: Soviet Union

The 1987 Wrestling World Cup was held in Ulaanbaatar, Mongolian People's Republic at Central Sports Palace. The freestyle wrestling competition was held 28–29 November. The Wrestling World Cup was held in Mongolia for the first time.

== Medal table ==
Rank	Nation	Gold	Silver	Bronze	Total
1	Soviet Union	7	3	0	10
2	United States	2	1	4	7
3	Mongolia	1	6	2	9
4	Cuba	0	0	4	4
Totals (4 entries)		10	10	10	30

== Team ranking ==
Rank	Men's freestyle
Rank	Team
1	Soviet Union
2	Mongolia
3	United States
4	Cuba
5	Japan
6	Australia

== Medal summary ==
=== Men's freestyle ===
Event	Gold	Silver	Bronze			
48 kg	Sergey Karamchakov; Soviet Union	T. Sukhbaatar; Mongolia	Woodbern Ed; United States	Zayas P. Cuba	Yamashita S. Japan	
52 kg	Zambalov Sergey; Soviet Union	Tserenbaataryn Enkhbayar; Mongolia	Mark Schwab; United States	Kamishima K. Japan	Levya A. Cuba	Armstrong J. Australia
57 kg	Abduldaudov Kamalutdin; Soviet Union	Khaltmaagiin Battuul; Mongolia	Alejandro Puerto; Cuba	Darkus Kevin; United States	Kakuchiyama Yu. Japan	Mijatovic O. Australia
62 kg	Stepan Sarkisyan; Soviet Union	A. Taivan; Mongolia	McFarland Joe; United States	Valdes E. Cuba	Goitsuka S. Japan	Ilhan M. Australia
68 kg	Magomedov Abdulla; Soviet Union	H. Amaraa; Mongolia	Giura John; United States	Brown C. Australia	Montero E. Cuba	Akaishi K. Japan
74 kg	Kenny Monday; United States	Dzugutov Vladimir; Soviet Union	Lodoin Enkhbayar; Mongolia	Rodriguez A. Cuba	Fox Ph. Australia	
82 kg	Lukman Zhabrailov; Soviet Union	Puntsagiin Sükhbat; Mongolia	Hernandez Orlando; Cuba	Chiapparelli; United States	Takashi; Japan	
90 kg	Zevegiin Düvchin; Mongolia	Sanasar Oganisyan; Soviet Union	Roberto Limonta; Cuba	Akaishi A. Japan	Goldman Duane; United States	Koenig; Australia
100 kg	Trost Kirk; United States	Atavov Akhmed; Soviet Union	Boldyn Javkhlantögs; Mongolia	Redmond G. Cuba		
+100 kg	David Gobejishvili; Soviet Union	Tom Erikson; United States	Domingo Mesa; Cuba			
