= Surya Saputra (wrestler) =

Indonesian wrestler

Personal information
- Nationality: Indonesian
- Born: 27 December 1967 South Kalimantan, Indonesia
- Died: 18 June 2024 (aged 56) Bandung, Indonesia

Sport
- Sport: Wrestling

Surya Saputra (27 December 1967 - 18 June 2024) was an Indonesian wrestler. He competed in the men's freestyle 52 kg at the 1988 Summer Olympics. He died on 18 June 2024 due to complications caused by diabetes.
