= David Ogden (wrestler) =

British wrestler

Personal information
- Nationality: British (English)
- Born: 30 March 1968 (age 58) Billinge, Merseyside, England
- Height: 163 cm (5 ft 4 in)
- Weight: 57 kg (126 lb)

Sport
- Sport: Wrestling
- Event: Freestyle

David Ogden (born 30 March 1968) is a British wrestler. He competed in the men's freestyle 57 kg at the 1988 Summer Olympics.

Ogden was a two-times winner of the British Wrestling Championships in 1984 and 1986.
