= Mahmoud Moustafa Fathalla =

Egyptian wrestler

Personal information
- Nationality: Egyptian
- Born: 16 May 1958 (age 68)

Sport
- Sport: Wrestling

Mahmoud Moustafa Fathalla (born 16 May 1958) is an Egyptian wrestler. He competed in the men's Greco-Roman 52 kg at the 1984 Summer Olympics.
