= Csaba Vadász =

Hungarian wrestler

Personal information
- Nationality: Hungarian
- Born: 25 August 1960 (age 65) Pápa, Hungary

Sport
- Sport: Wrestling

Csaba Vadász (born 25 August 1960) is a Hungarian wrestler. He competed in the men's Greco-Roman 52 kg at the 1988 Summer Olympics. He also had notable success in other international competitions, including multiple top finishes at both World and European Championships. Csaba Vadász was affiliated with the Dunaújvárosi Kohász Sportegyesület club during his competitive career.
