= Jozef Schwendtner =

Slovak wrestler

Personal information
- Nationality: Slovak
- Born: 1 July 1963 (age 63) Dunajská Streda, Czechoslovakia

Sport
- Sport: Wrestling

Jozef Schwendtner (born 1 July 1963) is a Slovak wrestler. He competed in the men's freestyle 57 kg at the 1988 Summer Olympics.
