= Ryo Kanehama =

Japanese wrestler

Personal information
- Full name: 金浜良 Kanehama Ryō
- Nationality: Japanese
- Born: 13 January 1967 (age 59)

Sport
- Sport: Wrestling
Medal record
Men's freestyle wrestling
Representing Japan
Asian Wrestling Championships
Bronze medal – third place	1991 New Dehli	57 kg
Bronze medal – third place	1989 Oarai	57 kg
Golden Grand Prix Ivan Yarygin
Gold medal – first place	1990 Krasnoyarsk	57 kg
Espoir World Championships
Bronze medal – third place	1987 Burnaby	57 kg
Junior World Championships
Gold medal – first place	1984 Washington	52 kg

Ryo Kanehama (born 13 January 1967) is a Japanese wrestler. He competed in the men's freestyle 57 kg at the 1988 Summer Olympics.

At the 1990 Golden Grand Prix Ivan Yarygin he won the gold medal in the men's freestyle 57 kg, with wins over Vitaly Sagalakov, Sergey Smal, Bagavdin Umakhanov.
