= Carlos Negron (wrestler) =

Puerto Rican wrestler

Personal information
- Nationality: Puerto Rican
- Born: 7 September 1964 (age 61)

Sport
- Sport: Wrestling

Carlos Negron (born 7 September 1964) is a Puerto Rican wrestler. He competed in the men's freestyle 52 kg at the 1988 Summer Olympics.
