= Oscar Muñoz (wrestler) =

Colombian wrestler (born 1964)

Personal information
- Full name: Oscar Bairon Muñoz Echeverry
- Born: 28 November 1964 (age 61) Medellín, Colombia
- Height: 160 cm (5 ft 3 in)

Sport
- Weight class: 52–57 kg (115–126 lb)
Medal record
Representing Colombia
Men's Greco-Roman wrestling
Bolivarian Games
Bronze medal – third place	1985 Cuenca	57 kg
Central American and Caribbean Games
Bronze medal – third place	1986 Santiago	52 kg
Men's freestyle wrestling
Pan American Championships
Bronze medal – third place	1989 Colorado Springs	57 kg
Central American and Caribbean Games
Bronze medal – third place	1990 Mexico City	52 kg

Oscar Bairon Muñoz Echeverry (Note: In this Spanish name, the first or paternal surname is Muñoz and the second or maternal family name is Echeverry.) (born 28 November 1964 in Medellín, Colombia) is an Olympic wrestler. He took part in the 1988 Summer Olympics in Seoul, competing in the 52 kg freestyle wrestling event. He failed to progress from the group stage.
