= Talla Diaw =

Senegalese wrestler

Personal information
- Nationality: Senegalese
- Born: 21 August 1954 (age 71)

Sport
- Sport: Wrestling

Talla Diaw (born 21 August 1954) is a Senegalese wrestler. He competed in the men's freestyle 52 kg at the 1984 Summer Olympics.
