= Mourad Zelfani =

Tunisian wrestler

Personal information
- Nationality: Tunisian
- Born: 11 December 1962 (age 63)

Sport
- Sport: Wrestling

Mourad Zelfani (born 11 December 1962) is a Tunisian wrestler. He competed in the men's freestyle 57 kg at the 1988 Summer Olympics.
