= José Marques =

Portuguese wrestler

Personal information
- Nationality: Portuguese
- Born: 11 November 1967 (age 58)

Sport
- Sport: Wrestling

José Marques (born 11 November 1967) is a Portuguese wrestler. He competed in the men's Greco-Roman 52 kg at the 1988 Summer Olympics.
