= Garba Lame =

Nigerian wrestler

Personal information
- Nationality: Nigerian
- Born: 2 March 1968 (age 58)

Sport
- Sport: Wrestling

Garba Lame (born 2 March 1968) is a Nigerian wrestler. He competed in the men's freestyle 52 kg at the 1988 Summer Olympics.
