= Ruslan Gadzhiyevich Karaev =

Soviet freestyle wrestler

Medal record

Men's freestyle wrestling

Representing Soviet Union

World Cup
Gold medal – first place	1989 Toledo	57 kg
Gold medal – first place	1988 Toledo	57 kg
Silver medal – second place	1990 Toledo	57 kg

European Championships
Silver medal – second place	1986 Piraeus	57 kg
Silver medal – second place	1983 Budapest	57 kg

Tbilisi International Tournament
Gold medal – first place	1988 Tbilisi	57 kg
Gold medal – first place	1987 Tbilisi	57 kg
Gold medal – first place	1986 Tbilisi	57 kg
Gold medal – first place	1985 Tbilisi	57 kg
Gold medal – first place	1983 Tbilisi	57 kg

Dan Kolov & Nikola Petrov Tournament
Gold medal – first place	1982 Haskovo	57 kg

European Junior Championships
Gold medal – first place	1980 Bursa	57 kg

USSR Championships
Gold medal – first place	1990 Ulan-Ude	57 kg
Gold medal – first place	1987 Voronezh	57 kg
Gold medal – first place	1986 Ordzhonikidze	57 kg
Gold medal – first place	1985 Yakutsk	57 kg
Silver medal – second place	1988 Krasnoyarsk	62 kg
Silver medal – second place	1982 Ordzhonikidze	57 kg
Bronze medal – third place	1983 Moscow	57 kg

Ruslan Gadzhiyevich Karaev (Russian: Русла́н Гаджи́евич Кара́ев; born February 29, 1960) was a retired Soviet freestyle wrestler.

Ruslan Karaev won USSR titles in 1985 (he defeated European and World Cup champion Gurgen Bagdasaryan), 1986, 1987 and 1990, placing second in 1982 (where he grappled with gold medalist Anatoly Beloglazov at 5-5 in the final), 1988 with victory over 1986 World Champion Khazar Isayev, and third in 1983. He was also the Wrestling World Cup champion in 1988, 1989. In 1990, Ruslan Karaev went 3-0, and received the silver medal at the World Cup, picking up win against the current European champion and eventual gold medalist Ahmet Ak along the way. Ruslan Karaev won the gold medal at the Tbilisi International Tournament in 1983, 1985, 1986, 1987, 1988 (one American coach summed up the Tbilisi International Tournament as "probably five times as tough" as the Olympics). He placed second at the European Championships in 1983, 1986. He won the 1980 European Junior Championships (Karaev beat the reigning Senior Balkans champion Georgi Kalchev) and 1982 Dan Kolov & Nikola Petrov Tournament. Ruslan Karaev defeated such the strongest opponents as the Olimpic champion Sergei Beloglazov, 1984 Olimpic silver medalist Barry Davis, 1988 Olimpic bronze medalist Noh Kyung-Sun, 1992 Olympic champion Alejandro Puerto and so on.

Ruslan Karaev was born in Sergokala, Dagestan, he graduated from Dagestan State Agrarian University in 1983.
