= Constantin Măndilă =

Romanian wrestler

Personal information
- Nationality: Romanian
- Born: 14 February 1955 (age 71)

Sport
- Sport: Wrestling

Constantin Măndilă (born 14 February 1955) is a Romanian wrestler. He competed in the men's freestyle 52 kg at the 1976 Summer Olympics.
