= Kamil Özdağ =

Turkish wrestler

Personal information
- Nationality: Turkish
- Born: 7 March 1953 (age 73)

Sport
- Sport: Wrestling

Kamil Özdağ (born 7 March 1953) is a Turkish wrestler. He competed in the men's freestyle 52 kg at the 1976 Summer Olympics.
