= Kim Jong-kyu (wrestler) =

South Korean wrestler (born 1958)

Personal information
- Born: 2 March 1958 (age 68)
Medal record
Men's freestyle wrestling
Representing South Korea
Olympic Games
Silver medal – second place	1984 Los Angeles	52 kg
Asian Games
Bronze medal – third place	1978 Bangkok	52 kg
Summer Universiade
Bronze medal – third place	1981 Bucharest	52 kg

Kim Jong-kyu (Korean: 김종규, born 2 March 1958) is a Korean former wrestler who competed in the 1984 Summer Olympics.
