= Muhammad Azeem =

Pakistani wrestler (born 1955)

Personal information
- Nationality: Pakistani
- Born: 11 April 1955 (age 71)

Sport
- Sport: Wrestling
Medal record
Men's freestyle wrestling
Representing Pakistan
Asian Games
Silver medal – second place	1978 Bangkok	57 kg

Muhammad Azeem (born 11 April 1955) is a Pakistani wrestler. He won a silver medal in the men's freestyle 57 kg event at the 1978 Asian Games. Azeem also represented Pakistan in the men's freestyle 57 kg at the 1988 Summer Olympics.
