= Tserenbaataryn Enkhbayar =

Mongolian wrestler

Personal information
- Nationality: Mongolian
- Born: 3 July 1967 (age 59)

Sport
- Sport: Freestyle Wrestling
- Weight class: 52 kg
Medal record
Men's freestyle wrestling
Representing Mongolia
World Cup
Silver medal – second place	1987 Ulaanbaatar	52 kg
Asian Championships
Bronze medal – third place	1991 New Delhi	52 kg
World Espoir Championships
Silver medal – second place	1989 Ulaanbaatar	52 kg

Tserenbaataryn Enkhbayar (born 3 July 1967) is a Mongolian wrestler. He competed at the 1988 Summer Olympics and the 1992 Summer Olympics.
