= Jihad Sharif =

Jordanian wrestler

Personal information
- Nationality: Jordanian
- Born: 26 July 1968 (age 56)

Sport
- Sport: Wrestling

Jihad Sharif (born 26 July 1968) is a Jordanian wrestler. He competed in two events at the 1988 Summer Olympics.
