= David Gobejishvili =

Georgian Olympic wrestler (born 1963)

Personal information
- Born: 3 January 1963 (age 63) Kutaisi, Georgia
Medal record
Men's freestyle wrestling
Representing Soviet Union
Olympic Games
Gold medal – first place	1988 Seoul	130 kg
World Championships
Gold medal – first place	1985 Budapest	130 kg
Gold medal – first place	1990 Tokyo	130 kg
Silver medal – second place	1986 Budapest	130 kg
Goodwill Games
Gold medal – first place	1990 Seattle	+100 kg
World Cup
Gold medal – first place	1987 Ulaanbaatar	+100 kg
Representing Unified Team
Olympic Games
Bronze medal – third place	1992 Barcelona	130 kg

David Gobejishvili (Georgian: დავით გობეჯიშვილი; born 3 January 1963) is a Soviet Georgian wrestler and Olympic champion in Freestyle wrestling.
