= Giunio Bruto =

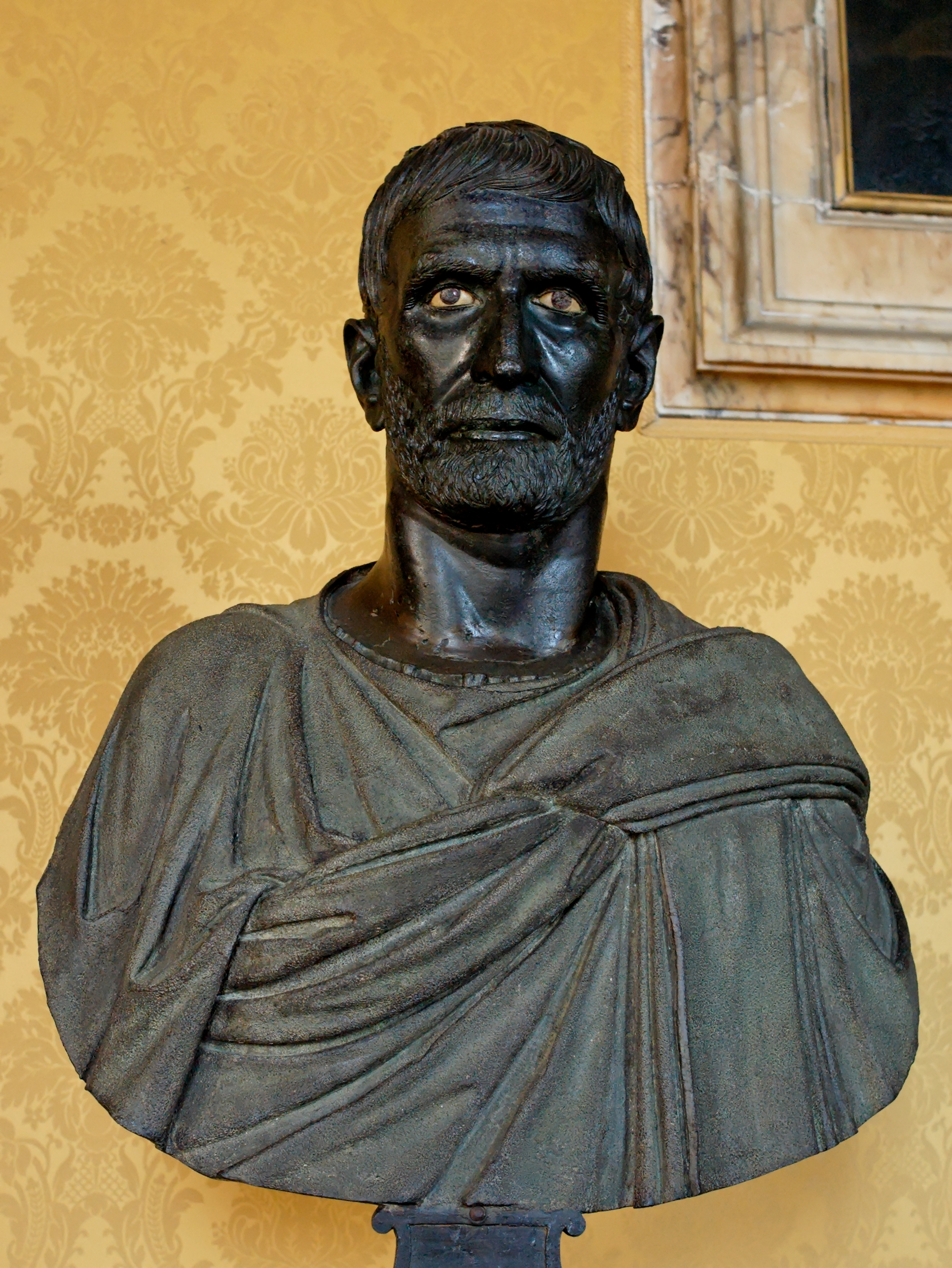
Lucius Junius Brutus

Giunio Bruto (Italian, Junius Brutus) is a two-act opera seria in two acts by Domenico Cimarosa to a libretto by Eschilo Acanzio, composed in 1781.

The opera was premiered in 1781 at the opening of Teatro Filarmonico in Verona. During the next two years further performances were given at Genoa, Siena and Pisa. In 1788, Joseph Haydn produced the opera at Esterháza; but despite a lavish staging and alterations to the score by Haydn himself, the production was not successful.

The plot revolves around the love between Lucius Junius Brutus's son Titus and Tullia (named Tarquinia in real life), the daughter of Tarquinius, the last king of Rome, whom Brutus had supplanted.

== Instrumentation ==
The opera was written for six voices and baroque orchestra:

- Cornets
- Oboe
- Violins
- Harpischord
- Bass

== Further links ==
- Rossi, Nick and Talmage Fauntleroy (1999). Domenico Cimarosa: his Life and Operas. Westport CT and London: Greenwood Press. ISBN 0-313-30112-3
- ISMLP
- English/Italian libretto
