= Taisto Halonen =

Finnish wrestler

Taisto Ilmari Halonen (born 20 May 1960 in Sodankylä) is a Finnish former wrestler who competed in the 1980 Summer Olympics and in the 1984 Summer Olympics.
