= Peter Stjernberg =

Swedish wrestler

Personal information
- Nationality: Swedish
- Born: 24 August 1970 (age 55) Hässleholm, Sweden

Sport
- Sport: Wrestling

Peter Stjernberg (born 24 August 1970) is a Swedish wrestler. He competed in the men's Greco-Roman 52 kg at the 1988 Summer Olympics.
