= László Bíró (wrestler) =

Hungarian wrestler

Personal information
- Nationality: Hungarian
- Born: 9 July 1960 (age 64); Tura, Hungary

Sport
- Sport: Wrestling

László Bíró (born 9 July 1960) is a Hungarian wrestler. He competed at the 1980 Summer Olympics and the 1988 Summer Olympics.
