= Farag Ali =

Egyptian wrestler

Personal information
- Nationality: Egyptian
- Born: 5 February 1963
- Died: 27 October 2015 (aged 52)

Sport
- Sport: Wrestling

Farag Ali (5 February 1963 – 27 October 2015) was an Egyptian wrestler. He competed in the men's freestyle 52 kg at the 1984 Summer Olympics.
