= Kim Jong-oh (wrestler) =

South Korean wrestler

Personal information
- Nationality: South Korean
- Born: 7 December 1966 (age 59)

Sport
- Sport: Wrestling

Kim Jong-oh (born 7 December 1966) is a South Korean wrestler. He competed in the men's freestyle 52 kg at the 1988 Summer Olympics.
