= Daniel Aceves =

Mexican wrestler (born 1964)

Medal record

Men's Wrestling

Representing Mexico

Olympic Games
Silver medal – second place	1984 Los Angeles	Men's Greco-Roman 52 kg

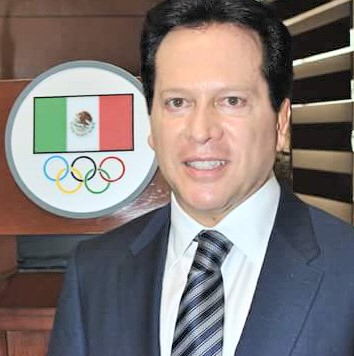

Daniel Aceves Villagrán OLY (born November 18, 1964, in Mexico City, Mexico) is a Mexican wrestler. He is son of Bobby Bonales. He competed in wrestling and represented Mexico at the 1984 Summer Olympics in Los Angeles. He won a silver medal in the Men's Greco-Roman 52 kg.
