= Aleksandr Ivanov (wrestler) =

Soviet wrestler (born 1951)

Personal information
- Full name: Aleksandr Nikolayevich Ivanov
- Born: 10 January 1951 (age 75) Sakha Republic, Russia
- Height: 158 cm (5 ft 2 in)
- Weight: 52 kg (115 lb)
Medal record
Men's freestyle wrestling
Representing the Soviet Union
Olympic Games
Silver medal – second place	1976 Montreal	Flyweight

Aleksandr Nikolayevich Ivanov (Александр Николаевич Иванов, born 10 January 1951 in Sakha Republic, Russia) is a former wrestler who competed for the Soviet Union at the 1976 Summer Olympics, where he won a silver medal in the men's freestyle 52 kg.

In November 2013, he served as one of the torch bearers in Yakutsk for the 2014 Winter Olympics torch relay.
