= Jon Rønningen =

Norwegian wrestler (born 1962)

Medal record

Men's Greco-Roman wrestling

Representing Norway

Olympic Games
Gold medal – first place	1988 Seoul	52 kg
Gold medal – first place	1992 Barcelona	52 kg

World Championships
Gold medal – first place	1985 Kolbotn	Flyweight
Silver medal – second place	1986 Budapest	Flyweight
Bronze medal – third place	1991 Varna	Flyweight

European Championships
Gold medal – first place	1990 Poznań	Flyweight
Bronze medal – third place	1986 Piraeus	Flyweight
Silver medal – second place	1988 Kolbotn	Flyweight

World Espoir Championships
Bronze medal – third place	1983 Kristiansund	Light flyweight

Jon Rønningen (born 28 November 1962 in Oslo) is a former Norwegian wrestler and a member of Kolbotn IL (one of the largest sports clubs in Norway). He won a total of nine medals in international championships and was the third Norwegian to win two individual Summer Olympic gold medals, winning gold at the 1988 Olympics in Seoul, Korea and the 1992 Olympics in Barcelona, Spain. His brother Lars Rønningen was also a highly accomplished wrestler.

In his 2017 book Hode i klemme (lit. In a headlock), Rønningen revealed that he has struggled with depression all through his life and has attempted suicide.

Preceded by Ingrid Kristiansen	Norwegian Sportsperson of the Year; 1988	Succeeded by Ole Kristian Furuseth
