= Henrik Gál =

Hungarian wrestler

Henrik Gál (born 5 March 1947 in Földes) is a Hungarian former wrestler who competed in the 1972 Summer Olympics and in the 1976 Summer Olympics.
