= Lamachi Elimu =

Kenyan wrestler

Personal information
- Nationality: Kenyan
- Born: 18 August 1960 (age 64)

Sport
- Sport: Wrestling

Lamachi Elimu (born 18 August 1960) is a Kenyan wrestler. He competed in two events at the 1988 Summer Olympics.
