= Jeon Hae-sup =

South Korean wrestler (born 1952)

Medal record

Men's freestyle wrestling

Representing South Korea

Olympic Games
| Bronze medal – third place | 1976 Montreal | flyweight |

- Jeon Hae-sup
- Hangul: 전해섭
- RR: Jeon Haeseop
- MR: Chŏn Haesŏp

Jeon Hae-sup (Korean: 전해섭; born 15 February 1952) is a South Korean former wrestler who competed in the 1976 Summer Olympics.
