= Lawrence Holmes =

Canadian wrestler

Lawrence Holmes (born 10 January 1962 in Georgetown, British Guiana) is a Canadian former wrestler who competed in the 1984 Summer Olympics and in the 1988 Summer Olympics. He is the brother of Gary Holmes.
