= Edvin-Eduardo Vásquez =

Guatemalan wrestler

Personal information
- Nationality: Guatemalan
- Born: 16 October 1969 (age 55)

Sport
- Sport: Wrestling

Edvin-Eduardo Vásquez (born 16 October 1969) is a Guatemalan wrestler. He competed in two events at the 1988 Summer Olympics.
