= Florentino Tirante =

Filipino wrestler

Personal information
- Full name: florentino Ga Tirante
- Nationality: Filipino
- Born: 16 October 1961 (age 64)

Sport
- Sport: Wrestling

Florentino Tirante (born 16 October 1961) is a Filipino wrestler. He competed in two events at the 1988 Summer Olympics.
