= Vladimir Toguzov =

Personal information
- Native name: Володимир Таймуразович Тогузов
- Nationality: Ukraine
- Height: 162 cm (5 ft 4 in)
- Weight: 52 kg (115 lb; 8 st 3 lb)

Sport
- Weight class: Flyweight
- Club: Dynamo Vladikavkaz, Champion Kyiv

Medal record

Men's freestyle wrestling

Representing the Soviet Union

Olympic Games
Bronze medal – third place	1988 Seoul	Flyweight

World Championships
Silver medal – second place	1989 Martigny	Flyweight
Bronze medal – third place	1991 Varna	Flyweight

European Championships
Gold medal – first place	1991 Stuttgart	Flyweight
Silver medal – second place	1987 Veliko Tarnovo	Flyweight
Silver medal – second place	1988 Manchester	Flyweight
Silver medal – second place	1990 Poznan	Flyweight

Goodwill Games
Gold medal – first place	1986 Moscow	Flyweight

Volodymyr Taymurazovich Tohuzov (born 31 August 1966 in Potsdam, German Democratic Republic) also known as Vladimir Toguzov is a former Ossetiian wrestler who competed in the 1988 Summer Olympics, in the 1992 Summer Olympics, and in the 1996 Summer Olympics. He was born to a Soviet Army officer stationed in East Germany.
