= Lee Jae-suk =

South Korean wrestler (born 1963)

- Hangul: 이재석
- RR: I Jaeseok
- MR: I Chaesŏk

Lee Jae-suk
Medal record

Men's Greco-Roman wrestling

Representing South Korea

Olympic Games
Bronze medal – third place	1988 Seoul	52 kg

Lee Jae-Suk (born 28 November 1963) is a South Korean former wrestler who competed in the 1988 Summer Olympics.
