= Atsuji Miyahara =

Japanese wrestler (born 1958)

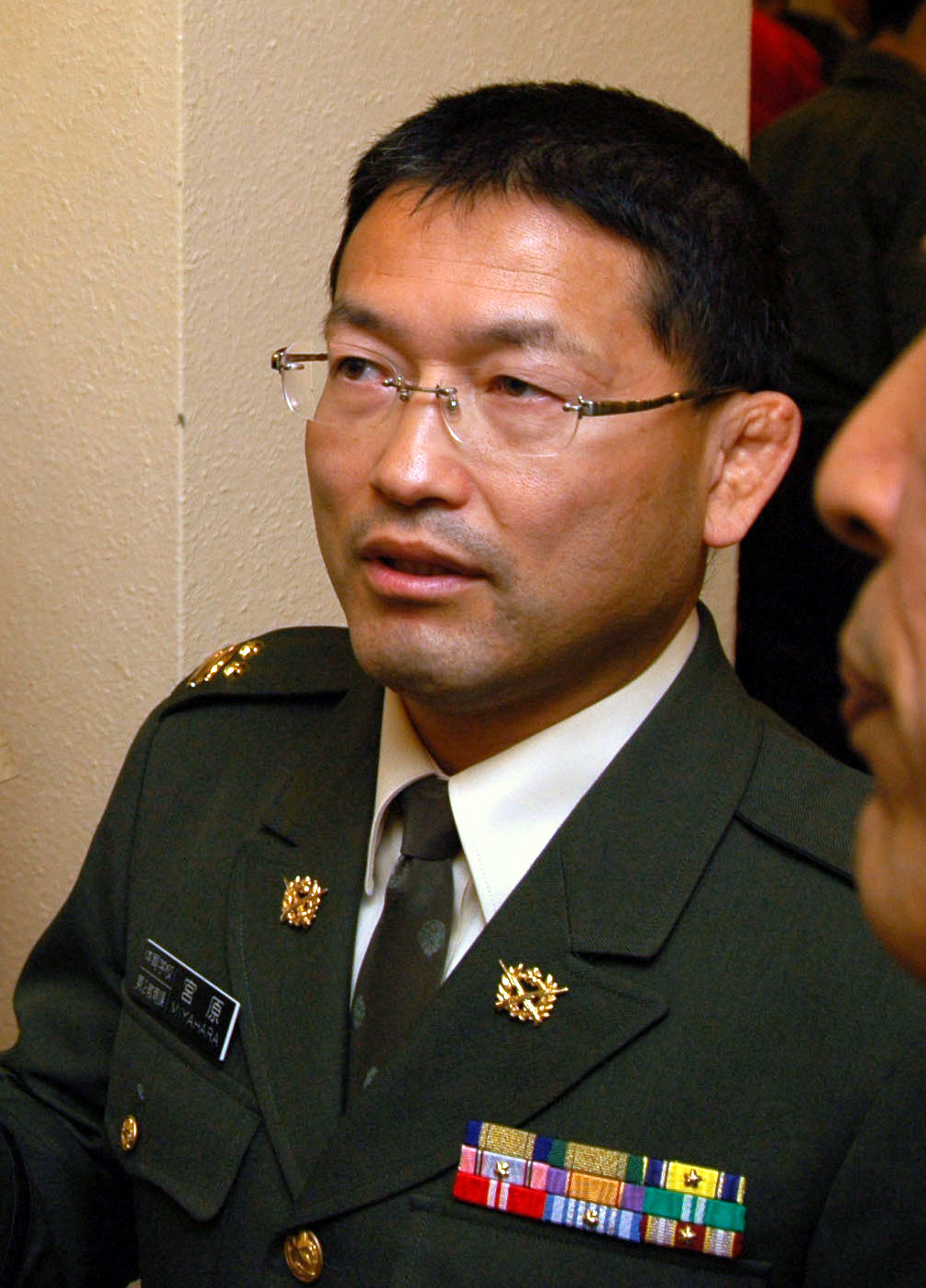
- Miyahara in 2007

Medal record

Men's Greco-Roman wrestling

Representing Japan

Olympic Games
Gold medal – first place	1984 Los Angeles	Flyweight
Silver medal – second place	1988 Seoul	Flyweight

Atsuji Miyahara (宮原 厚次, Miyahara Atsuji; born December 20, 1958) is a Japanese wrestler and Olympic champion in Greco-Roman wrestling.

== Olympics ==
Miyahara competed at the 1984 Summer Olympics in Los Angeles where he received a gold medal in Greco-Roman wrestling, the flyweight class. He received a silver medal at the 1988 Summer Olympics in Seoul.
