= Serge Robert (wrestler) =

French wrestler

Personal information
- Nationality: French
- Born: 2 May 1963 (age 61); Bron, France

Sport
- Sport: Wrestling

Serge Robert (born 2 May 1963) is a French wrestler. He competed at the 1988 Summer Olympics and the 1992 Summer Olympics.
