= Li Bong-sun =

North Korean wrestler

Li Bong-sun(리봉순)
Personal information
- Nationality: North Korean
- Born: 14 March 1949 (age 77)

Sport
- Sport: Wrestling

Li Bong-sun (born 14 March 1949) is a North Korean wrestler. He competed in the men's freestyle 52 kg at the 1976 Summer Olympics.
