= Kuldeep Singh (wrestler) =

Indian wrestler

Personal information
- Nationality: Indian
- Born: 5 February 1966 (age 60)

Sport
- Sport: Wrestling

Kuldeep Singh (born 5 February 1966) is an Indian wrestler. He competed in the men's freestyle 52 kg at the 1988 Summer Olympics.
