= Ahmad Nasir =

Afghan wrestler

Ahmad Nasir Lal
Personal information
- Nationality: Afghan
- Born: March 3, 1963 (age 62)

Sport
- Sport: Wrestling

Ahmad Nasir Lal (born 1963) is an Afghan former wrestler. He competed at the 1988 Summer Olympic Games in the flyweight event.
