= Brent Hollamby =

New Zealand wrestler

Personal information
- Nationality: New Zealand
- Born: 12 July 1964 (age 62) Mosgiel, New Zealand

Sport
- Sport: Wrestling

Brent Hollamby (born 12 July 1964) is a New Zealand wrestler. He competed in the men's freestyle 57 kg at the 1988 Summer Olympics.
