= Liang Dejin =

Chinese wrestler

Personal information
- Full name: Chinese: 梁 德金; pinyin: Liáng Dé-jīn
- Nationality: Chinese
- Born: 1 November 1960 (age 66)

Sport
- Sport: Wrestling

Liang Dejin (born 1 November 1960) is a Chinese wrestler. He competed at the 1984 Summer Olympics and the 1988 Summer Olympics.
