= Noh Kyung-sun =

South Korean wrestler (born 1964)

- Hangul: 노경선
- RR: No Gyeongseon
- MR: No Kyŏngsŏn

Olympic medal record

Representing South Korea

Men's freestyle wrestling

Olympic Games
Bronze medal – third place	1988 Seoul	57 kg

Asian Championships
Gold medal – first place	1989 Oarai	57 kg

Noh Kyung-sun (Korean: 노경선; born 2 February 1964) is a South Korean former freestyle wrestler who competed in the 1988 Summer Olympics.
