= Diego Lo Brutto =

French wrestler

Personal information
- Nationality: French
- Born: 26 August 1953 (age 72)
- Height: 156 cm (5 ft 1 in)

Sport
- Sport: Wrestling

Diego Lo Brutto (born 26 August 1953) is a French wrestler. He competed in the men's freestyle 52 kg at the 1976 Summer Olympics and placed 6th.
