= Iván Garcés =

Ecuadorian wrestler

Iván Garcés (born 24 May 1966) is an Ecuadorian former wrestler who competed in the 1984 Summer Olympics.
