= Hu Richa =

Chinese wrestler (born 1963)

Personal information
- Full name: 呼日查
- Nationality: Chinese
- Born: 3 January 1963 (age 62)

Sport
- Sport: Wrestling

Hu Richa (Chinese: 呼日查; pinyin: Hū Rì-chá; born 3 January 1963) is a Chinese wrestler. He competed at the 1984 Summer Olympics and the 1988 Summer Olympics.
