= Thierry Bourdin =

French wrestler

Personal information
- Nationality: French
- Born: 30 October 1962 (age 64) Clermont-Ferrand, France

Sport
- Sport: Wrestling

Thierry Bourdin (born 30 October 1962) is a French wrestler. He competed at the 1984 Summer Olympics, the 1988 Summer Olympics and the 1992 Summer Olympics.
