= Jesmond Giordemaina =

Maltese wrestler (born 1966)

Personal information
- Nationality: Maltese
- Born: 13 July 1966 (age 58)

Sport
- Sport: Wrestling

Jesmond Giordemaina (born 13 July 1966) is a Maltese wrestler. He competed at the 1984 Summer Olympics and the 1988 Summer Olympics.
