= Eloy Abreu =

Cuban wrestler (born 1956)

Personal information
- Nationality: Cuban
- Born: 2 July 1956 (age 68)
- Height: 1.60 m (5 ft 3 in)
- Weight: 54 kg (119 lb)

Sport
- Sport: Wrestling

Eloy Abreu Morales (born 2 July 1956) is a Cuban wrestler. He competed in the 1976 Summer Olympics.
