= Béla Nagy (wrestler) =

Hungarian wrestler

Personal information
- Nationality: Hungarian
- Born: 20 March 1962 (age 63); Nádudvar, Hungary

Sport
- Sport: Wrestling

Béla Nagy (born 20 March 1962) is a Hungarian wrestler. He competed at the 1988 Summer Olympics and the 1992 Summer Olympics.
