= Sangmu Gymnasium =

Sports venue in Seongnam, South Korea

Coordinates: 37.431220°N 127.140013°E

Sangmu Gymnasium is an indoor sporting arena located in Seongnam, South Korea. The capacity of the arena is 5,000 people and was built in 1986 to host wrestling events at the 1988 Summer Olympics.
