= Erol Kemah =

Turkish wrestler (born 1961)

Erol Kemah (born 20 November 1961) is a Turkish former wrestler who competed in the 1984 Summer Olympics and in the 1988 Summer Olympics.
