= Wrestling at the 1988 Summer Olympics =

Wrestling at the Games of the XXIV Olympiad
- Venue: Sangmu Gymnasium
- Dates: 18 September – 1 October
- Competitors: 429 from 69 nations

At the 1988 Summer Olympics in Seoul, 20 wrestling events were contested, for all men only. There were 10 weight classes in each of the freestyle wrestling and Greco-Roman wrestling disciplines.

== Medal summary ==
=== Freestyle ===
Event	Gold	Silver	Bronze
48 kg	Takashi Kobayashi; Japan	Ivan Tzonov; Bulgaria	Sergei Karamchakov; Soviet Union
52 kg	Mitsuru Sato; Japan	Šaban Trstena; Yugoslavia	Vladimir Toguzov; Soviet Union
57 kg	Sergey Beloglazov; Soviet Union	Askari Mohammadian; Iran	Noh Kyung-sun; South Korea
62 kg	John Smith; United States	Stepan Sarkisyan; Soviet Union	Simeon Shterev; Bulgaria
68 kg	Arsen Fadzaev; Soviet Union	Park Jang-soon; South Korea	Nate Carr; United States
74 kg	Kenny Monday; United States	Adlan Varaev; Soviet Union	Rahmat Sofiadi; Bulgaria
82 kg	Han Myung-woo; South Korea	Necmi Gençalp; Turkey	Jozef Lohyňa; Czechoslovakia
90 kg	Makharbek Khadartsev; Soviet Union	Akira Ota; Japan	Kim Tae-woo; South Korea
100 kg	Vasile Puşcaşu; Romania	Leri Khabelov; Soviet Union	William Scherr; United States
130 kg	David Gobejishvili; Soviet Union	Bruce Baumgartner; United States	Andreas Schröder; East Germany

=== Greco-Roman ===
Event	Gold	Silver	Bronze
48 kg	Vincenzo Maenza; Italy	Andrzej Głąb; Poland	Bratan Tzenov; Bulgaria
52 kg	Jon Rønningen; Norway	Atsuji Miyahara; Japan	Lee Jae-suk; South Korea
57 kg	András Sike; Hungary	Stoyan Balov; Bulgaria	Charalambos Cholidis; Greece
62 kg	Kamandar Madzhidov; Soviet Union	Zhivko Vangelov; Bulgaria	An Dae-hyun; South Korea
68 kg	Levon Julfalakyan; Soviet Union	Kim Sung-moon; South Korea	Tapio Sipilä; Finland
74 kg	Kim Young-nam; South Korea	Daulet Turlykhanov; Soviet Union	Józef Tracz; Poland
82 kg	Mikhail Mamiashvili; Soviet Union	Tibor Komáromi; Hungary	Kim Sang-kyu; South Korea
90 kg	Atanas Komchev; Bulgaria	Harri Koskela; Finland	Vladimir Popov; Soviet Union
100 kg	Andrzej Wroński; Poland	Gerhard Himmel; West Germany	Dennis Koslowski; United States
130 kg	Aleksandr Karelin; Soviet Union	Rangel Gerovski; Bulgaria	Tomas Johansson; Sweden

== Medal table ==
Rank	Nation	Gold	Silver	Bronze	Total
1	Soviet Union	8	4	3	15
2	South Korea	2	2	5	9
3	Japan	2	2	0	4
4	United States	2	1	3	6
5	Bulgaria	1	4	3	8
6	Poland	1	1	1	3
7	Hungary	1	1	0	2
8	Italy	1	0	0	1
8	Norway	1	0	0	1
8	Romania	1	0	0	1
11	Finland	0	1	1	2
12	Iran	0	1	0	1
12	Turkey	0	1	0	1
12	West Germany	0	1	0	1
12	Yugoslavia	0	1	0	1
16	Czechoslovakia	0	0	1	1
16	East Germany	0	0	1	1
16	Greece	0	0	1	1
16	Sweden	0	0	1	1
Totals (19 entries)		20	20	20	60

== Participating nations ==
A total of 429 wrestlers from 69 nations competed at the Seoul Games:

- Afghanistan (5)
- American Samoa (1)
- Argentina (2)
- Australia (3)
- Austria (5)
- Belgium (1)
- Brazil (2)
- Bulgaria (20)
- Cameroon (4)
- Canada (11)
- China (11)
- Chinese Taipei (4)
- Colombia (4)
- Czechoslovakia (9)
- East Germany (8)
- Egypt (5)
- El Salvador (1)
- Finland (12)
- France (9)
- The Gambia (3)
- Great Britain (7)
- Greece (5)
- Guam (1)
- Guatemala (1)
- Guinea (2)
- Hungary (18)
- India (7)
- Indonesia (2)
- Iran (15)
- Iraq (5)
- Ireland (1)
- Israel (2)
- Italy (4)
- Japan (20)
- Jordan (2)
- Kenya (4)
- Lebanon (1)
- Malta (2)
- Mauritania (4)
- Mauritius (1)
- Mexico (4)
- Mongolia (9)
- Morocco (5)
- New Zealand (2)
- Nigeria (6)
- North Yemen (3)
- Norway (5)
- Pakistan (3)
- Panama (2)
- Peru (1)
- Philippines (2)
- Poland (18)
- Portugal (1)
- Puerto Rico (2)
- Romania (4)
- Samoa (2)
- Senegal (4)
- South Korea (19)
- Soviet Union (20)
- Spain (9)
- Sweden (10)
- Switzerland (4)
- Syria (8)
- Tunisia (3)
- Turkey (13)
- United States (20)
- Vietnam (1)
- West Germany (17)
- Yugoslavia (10)

== See also ==
- List of World and Olympic Champions in men's freestyle wrestling
- List of World and Olympic Champions in Greco-Roman wrestling
