= Fritz Niebler =

German wrestler (born 1958)

Personal information
- Nationality: German
- Born: 28 August 1958 (age 68) Viernheim, Germany

Sport
- Sport: Wrestling

Fritz Niebler (born 28 August 1958) is a German wrestler. He competed at the 1976 Summer Olympics and the 1984 Summer Olympics.
