= Ahmet Ak =

Turkish wrestler

Personal information
- Nationality: Turkish
- Born: 20 May 1966 (age 60) Kahramanmaraş, Turkey

Sport
- Sport: Wrestling

Ahmet Ak (born 20 May 1966) is a Turkish wrestler. He competed in the men's freestyle 57 kg at the 1988 Summer Olympics.
