= Jean-Pierre Chambellan =

French wrestler (born 1958)

Jean-Pierre Chambellan (born 7 October 1958) is a French former wrestler who competed in the 1984 Summer Olympics.
