= Arslan Seyhanlı =

Turkish wrestler (born 1960)

Personal information
- Nationality: Turkish
- Born: 1 January 1960 (age 65)

Sport
- Sport: Wrestling

Arslan Seyhanlı (born 1 January 1960) is a Turkish wrestler. He competed at the 1984 Summer Olympics and the 1988 Summer Olympics.
