= Poland at the 1988 Summer Olympics =

- IOC code: POL
- NOC: Polish Olympic Committee

in Seoul
- Competitors: 143 (111 men and 32 women) in 19 sports
- Flag bearer: Bogdan Daras
- Medals Ranked 20th: Gold 2 Silver 5 Bronze 9 Total 16

Summer Olympics appearances (overview)
- 1924; 1928; 1932; 1936; 1948; 1952; 1956; 1960; 1964; 1968; 1972; 1976; 1980; 1984; 1988; 1992; 1996; 2000; 2004; 2008; 2012; 2016; 2020; 2024

Other related appearances
- Russian Empire (1900, 1912); Austria (1908–1912)

Poland competed at the 1988 Summer Olympics in Seoul, South Korea. Poland returned to the Summer Olympic Games after having boycotted the 1984 Summer Olympics. 143 competitors, 111 men and 32 women, took part in 105 events in 19 sports.

== Medalists ==
Medal	Name	Sport	Event	Date
Gold	Andrzej Wroński	Wrestling	Men's Greco-Roman 100 kg	21 September
Gold	Waldemar Legień	Judo	Men's 78 kg	28 September
Silver	Joachim Halupczok; Zenon Jaskuła; Marek Leśniewski; Andrzej Sypytkowski	Cycling	Men's team time trial	18 September
Silver	Andrzej Głąb	Wrestling	Men's Greco-Roman 48 kg	20 September
Silver	Janusz Olech	Fencing	Men's sabre	23 September
Silver	Janusz Pawłowski	Judo	Men's 65 kg	26 September
Silver	Marek Dopierała; Marek Łbik	Canoeing	Men's C-2 500 metres	30 September
Bronze	Józef Tracz	Wrestling	Men's Greco-Roman 74 kg	21 September
Bronze	Artur Wojdat	Swimming	Men's 400 metre freestyle	23 September
Bronze	Sławomir Zawada	Weightlifting	Men's 90 kg	25 September
Bronze	Jan Dydak	Boxing	Welterweight	29 September
Bronze	Henryk Petrich	Boxing	Light heavyweight	29 September
Bronze	Andrzej Gołota	Boxing	Heavyweight	29 September
Bronze	Janusz Zarenkiewicz	Boxing	Super heavyweight	29 September
Bronze	Izabela Dylewska-Światowiak	Canoeing	Women's K-1 500 metres	30 September
Bronze	Marek Dopierała; Marek Łbik	Canoeing	Men's C-2 1000 metres	1 October

== Competitors ==
The following is the list of number of competitors in the Games.

Sport	Men	Women	Total
Archery	0	3	3
Athletics	12	9	21
Boxing	7	–	7
Canoeing	7	5	12
Cycling	11	0	11
Diving	1	0	1
Equestrian	4	0	4
Fencing	13	5	18
Gymnastics	0	2	2
Judo	6	–	6
Modern pentathlon	3	–	3
Rowing	8	5	13
Sailing	2	0	2
Shooting	5	1	6
Swimming	3	2	5
Table tennis	3	0	3
Tennis	1	0	1
Weightlifting	7	–	7
Wrestling	18	–	18
Total	111	32	143

== Archery ==
Poland entered three women in its fourth appearance in Olympic archery.

Women

Athlete	Event	Ranking round		Round of 16		Quarterfinals		Semifinals		Final	
Athlete	Event	Score	Seed	Score	Seed	Score	Seed	Score	Seed	Score	Rank
Joanna Helbin	Individual	1207	40	Did not advance							
Beata Iwanek	Individual	1222	33	Did not advance							
Joanna Kwaśna	Individual	1252	16	304	17	303	16	Did not advance			
Joanna Helbin; Beata Iwanek; Joanna Kwaśna	Team	3681	9	—N/a				945	10	Did not advance	

== Athletics ==
Men
Track & road events

Athlete	Event	Heat		Quarterfinal		Semifinal		Final	
Athlete	Event	Result	Rank	Result	Rank	Result	Rank	Result	Rank
Jacek Bednarek	50 km walk	—N/a						3:58:31	24
Tomasz Jędrusik	400 m	46.12	3 Q	45.27	4 Q	46.17	8	Did not advance	
Bogusław Mamiński	3000 m steeplechase	8:45.72	6	—N/a		8:18.28	6	8:15.97	8
Ryszard Ostrowski	800 m	1:49.04	3 Q	1:47.72	6	Did not advance			
Zdzisław Szlapkin	20 km walk	—N/a						1:27:23	36

Field events

Athlete	Event	Qualification		Final	
Athlete	Event	Distance	Position	Distance	Position
Mirosław Chmara	Pole vault	5.40	4 q	NM	
Andrzej Grabarczyk	Triple jump	16.24	15	Did not advance	
Marian Kolasa	Pole vault	5.40	4 q	NM	
Krzysztof Krawczyk	High jump	2.25	15 q	2.31	12
Helmut Krieger	Shot put	19.75	10 Q	1.89	19.51
Artur Partyka	High jump	2.19	20	Did not advance	
Jacek Pastusiński	Triple jump	16.66	5 Q	16.72	8

Women
Track & road events

Athlete	Event	Heat		Quarterfinal		Semifinal		Final	
Athlete	Event	Result	Rank	Result	Rank	Result	Rank	Result	Rank
Genowefa Błaszak	400 m hurdles	56.18	3 Q	—N/a		56.76	7	Did not advance	
Jolanta Janota	100 m	11.71	4	Did not advance					
Jolanta Janota	200 m	23.40	3 Q	23.34	7	Did not advance			
Wanda Panfil	10,000 m	—N/a						DNS	
Wanda Panfil	Marathon	—N/a						2.34:35	22
Ewa Pisiewicz	100 m	11.84	6	Did not advance					
Agnieszka Siwek	200 m	23.10	2 Q	22.96	4 Q	23.20	7	Did not advance	
Joanna Smolarek	100 m	11.43	3 Q	11.35	6	Did not advance			
Jolanta Janota; Ewa Pisiewicz; Agnieszka Siwek; Joanna Smolarek	4 × 100 m relay	43.98	4 Q	—N/a		43.44	4 Q	43.93	6

Field events

Athlete	Event	Qualification		Final	
Athlete	Event	Distance	Position	Distance	Position
Jolanta Bartczak	Long jump	6.30	20	Did not advance	
Agata Karczmarek	Long jump	6.67	8	6.60	7
Renata Katewicz	Discus throw	60.34	13	Did not advance	

== Boxing ==
Men

Athlete	Event	1 Round	2 Round	3 Round	Quarterfinals	Semifinals	Final
Athlete	Event	Opposition Result	Opposition Result	Opposition Result	Opposition Result	Opposition Result	Rank
Grzegorz Jabłoński	Bantamweight	BYE	Nyamaagiin Altankhuyag (MGL); L 2-3	Did not advance			
Tomasz Nowak	Featherweight	Djingarey Mamodou (NIG); W 5–0	Ulaipalota Tautauma (SAM); W WO	Eugene Seymour (BAH); W 5-0	Lee Jae-Hyuk (KOR); L 0-5	Did not advance	5
Andrzej Możdżeń	Light Welterweight	BYE	Duke Chinyadza (ZIM); L 2–3	Did not advance			
Jan Dydak	Welterweight	BYE	José García (VEN); W 4-1	Humberto Aranda (CRC); W 4-1	Adewale Adgebusi (NIG); W 4-1	Robert Wangila (KEN); L WO	Bronze medal
Henryk Petrich	Light Heavyweight	Park Byun-Jin (KOR); W RSC	Niels Madsen (DEN); W 5-0	—N/a	Ahmed Elnaggar (EGY); W 5-0	Andrew Maynard (USA); L AB	Bronze medal
Andrzej Golota	Heavyweight	BYE	Svilen Rusinov (BUL); W 5-0	—N/a	Harold Obunga (KEN); W 5-0	Baik Hyun-Man (KOR); L RSC	Bronze medal
Janusz Zarenkiewicz	Super Heavyweight	BYE	Harold Arroyo (PUR); W 5-0	—N/a	Andreas Schnieders (FRG); W 3-2	Lennox Lewis (CAN); L WO	Bronze medal

== Canoeing ==
=== Sprint ===
Men

Athlete	Event	Heats		Repechages		Semifinals		Final	
Athlete	Event	Time	Rank	Time	Rank	Time	Rank	Time	Rank
Jan Pinczura	C-1 500 m	2:00.20	5 Q	AC	2 Q	1:57.61	2 Q	1:59.97	5
Jan Pinczura	C-1 1000 m	4:14.10	5 Q	4:24.10	3 Q	DSQ	Did not advance		
Marek Łbik; Marek Dopierała	C-2 500 m	1:43.09	1 Q	BYE		1:49.06	2 Q	1:43.61	Silver medal
Marek Łbik; Marek Dopierała	C-2 1000 m	3:44.24	2 Q	BYE		3:50.45	1 Q	3:54.33	Bronze medal
Maciej Freimut; Wojciech Kurpiewski	K-2 500 m	1:34.72	4 Q	1:41.99	3 Q	1:35.33	3 Q	1:36.22	6
Maciej Freimut; Wojciech Kurpiewski; Grzegorz Krawców; Kazimierz Krzyżański	K-4 1000 m	3:06.52	1 Q	BYE		3:10.87	2 Q	3:04.73	5

Women

Athlete	Event	Heats		Repechages		Semifinals		Final	
Athlete	Event	Time	Rank	Time	Rank	Time	Rank	Time	Rank
Izabela Dylewska	K-1 500 m	1:57.42	2 Q	—N/a		1:56.47	1 Q	1:57.38	Bronze medal
Bożena Ksiąźek; Jolanta Łukaszewicz	K-2 500 m	1:51.55	3 Q	BYE		1:54.30	3 Q	1:51.13	9
Bożena Ksiąźek; Elżbieta Urbańczyk; Katarzyna Weiss; Jolanta Łukaszewicz	K-4 500 m	1:41.07	4 Q	—N/a		1:42.55	2 Q	1:47.40	8

== Cycling ==
Eleven male cyclists represented Poland in 1988.

=== Road ===
Athlete	Event	Time	Rank
Jacek Bodyk	Men's road race	4:32:56	28
Andrzej Mierzejewski	Men's road race	4:48:06	108
Zdzisław Wrona	Men's road race	4:32:56	17
Andrzej Sypytkowski; Joachim Halupczok; Zenon Jaskuła; Marek Leśniewski	Team time trial	1:57:54.2	Silver medal

=== Track ===
Pursuit

Athlete	Event	Qualification		Round of 16	Quarterfinals	Semifinals	Final	
Athlete	Event	Time	Rank	Opposition Time	Opposition Time	Opposition Time	Opposition Time	Rank
Ryszard Dawidowicz	Men's individual pursuit	4:36.21	5 Q	Gabriel Ovidio Curuchet (ARG); W 4:42.03	Dean Woods (AUS); L 4:39.44	Did not advance		5
Ryszard Dawidowicz; Joachim Halupczok; Andrzej Sikorski; Marian Turowski	Men's team pursuit	4:21.30	6 Q	—N/a	West Germany (FRG); L 4:22.50	Did not advance		7

Points race

Athlete	Event	Points	Laps	Rank
Wojciech Pawłak	Men's points race	8	0	16

== Diving ==
Men

Athlete	Event	Preliminaries		Final	
Athlete	Event	Points	Rank	Points	Rank
Tomasz Rossa	3 m springboard	475.44	27	Did not advance	

== Equestrianism ==
=== Eventing ===
Athlete	Horse	Event	Dressage		Cross-country			Jumping			Total	
Athlete	Horse	Event	Dressage		Cross-country			Final			Total	
Athlete	Horse	Event	Penalties	Rank	Penalties	Total	Rank	Penalties	Total	Rank	Penalties	Rank
Bogusław Jarecki	Niewiaza	Individual	56,60	12	44,80	101,40	11	10,00	111,40	12	111,40	12
Eugeniusz Koczorski	Idrys	Individual	90,00	46	110,80	260,80	36	16,50	277,30	33	277,30	33
Krzysztof Rafalak	Dziwnograd	Individual	72,40	32	56,40	158,40	23	5,00	163,40	21	163,40	21
Krzysztof Rogowski	Alkierz	Individual	80,20	41	25,60	109,80	15	5,00	114,80	13	114,80	13
Bogusław Jarecki; Krzysztof Rafalak; Eugeniusz Koczorski; Krzysztof Rogowski	See above	Team	209,20	8	160,40	369,60	4	20,00	389,60	4	389,60	4

# – Indicates that points do not count in team total
* Only three riders are eligible to qualify for the jumping final.

== Fencing ==
18 fencers, 13 men and 5 women, represented Poland in 1988.

=== Men ===
==== Individual ====
Athlete	Event	Elimination round	Round I	Repechage Round I	Round II	Repechage Round II	Round III	Repechage Round III	Round IV	Quarterfinal	Semifinal	Final / BM	
Athlete	Event	Opposition Score	Opposition Score	Opposition Score	Opposition Score	Opposition Score	Opposition Score	Opposition Score	Opposition Score	Opposition Score	Opposition Score	Opposition Score	Rank
Ludomir Chronowski	Individual épée	33	Did not advance										
Witold Gadomski	Individual épée	21 Q	Yun (KOR); W 10-6	BYE	Rivias Nieto (COL); L 5-10	Pentano (ITA); L 5-10	Did not advance						
Cezary Siess	Individual épée	43	Did not advance										
Leszek Bandach	Individual foil	29 Q	Enkelmann (FRG); L 5–10	Soumagne (BEL); L 7-10	Did not advance								
Marian Sypniewski	Individual foil	27 Q	Lewison (USA); L 6-10	Harper (GBR); L 9–10	Did not advance								
Bogusław Zych	Individual foil	15 Q	Rocheleau (CAN); W 10-3	BYE	Gey (FRG); L 7-10	Wendt (FRG); W 10-1	Mamedow (URS); L 7-10	Did not advance					
Robert Kościelniakowski	Individual sabre	18	Did not advance										
Janusz Olech	Individual sabre	2 Q	Scalzo (ITA); W 10-7	BYE	Becker (FRG); L 7-10	Piguła (POL); W 10-6	—N/a			Nolte (FRG); W 10-7	Scalzo (ITA); W 10-9	Lamour (FRA); L 10-4	Silver medal
Tadeusz Piguła	Individual sabre	12 Q	Nebald (HUN); L 5-10	Marin (ITA); W 10-9	BYE	Olech (POL); L 6-10	Did not advance						

==== Team ====
Athlete	Event	Elimination round	1/16	Quarterfinal	Semifinal	Final / BM	
Athlete	Event	Opposition Score	Opposition Score	Opposition Score	Opposition Score	Opposition Score	Rank
Ludomir Chronowski; Witold Gadomski; Cezary Siess; Bogusław Zych; Piotr Kiełpikowski	Team épée	Kuwait; W 9-1; France; L 4-9	Sweden; L 6-9	—N/a			10
Leszek Bandach; Marian Sypniewski; Bogusław Zych; Waldemar Ciesielczyk; Piotr Kiełpikowski	Team foil	Canada; W 9-2; Hong Kong; W 9-0; Soviet Union; L 3-9	BYE	East Germany; L 3-9	Classification semi-final Italy; W 9-7	5th place final France; W 8-8	5
Janusz Olech; Robert Kościelniakowski; Andrzej Kostrzewa; Tadeusz Piguła; Marek Gniewkowski	Team sabre	China; W 9-1; Canada; W 9-3; Soviet Union; L 7-9	—N/a	Hungary; L 8-8	—N/a	5th place final West Germany; W 9-4	5

=== Women ===
==== Individual ====
Athlete	Event	Elimination round	Round I	Repechage Round I	Round II	Repechage Round II	Quarterfinal	Semifinal	Final / BM	
Athlete	Event	Opposition Score	Opposition Score	Opposition Score	Opposition Score	Opposition Score	Opposition Score	Opposition Score	Opposition Score	Rank
Agnieszka Dubrawska	Individual foil	30	Did not advance							
Jolanta Królikowska	Individual foil	15 Q	Sadowskaja (URS); L6-8	Bilodeaux (USA); L 6-8	Did not advance					
Anna Sobczak	Individual foil	23	Did not advance							

==== Team ====
Athlete	Event	Elimination round	Quarterfinal	Semifinal	Final / BM	
Athlete	Event	Opposition Score	Opposition Score	Opposition Score	Opposition Score	Rank
Agnieszka Dubrawska; Anna Sobczak; Jolanta Królikowska; Małgorzata Breś; Hanna Prusakowska	Team foil	France; L 3-9; Soviet Union; L 6-9	Did not advance			10

== Gymnastics ==
=== Rhythmic gymnastics ===
Athlete	Event	Final							
Athlete	Event	Rope	Hoop	Clubs	Ribbon	Total	Prelim Total	Total	Rank
Eliza Bialkowska	Individual	9.700	9.88	9.650	9.650	38.800	19.400	58.200	14
Teresa Folga	Individual	9.800	9.800	9.700	9.900	39.200	19.425	58.625	7

== Judo ==
Men

Athlete	Event	Preliminary	Round of 32	Round of 16	Quarterfinals	Semifinals	Repechage 1	Repechage 2	Repechage 3	Final / BM	
Athlete	Event	Opposition Result	Opposition Result	Opposition Result	Opposition Result	Opposition Result	Opposition Result	Opposition Result	Opposition Result	Opposition Result	Rank
Ireneusz Kiejda	−60 kg	BYE	Helmut Dietz (FRG); L 0000-0001	Did not advance							
Janusz Pawłowski	−66 kg	Philip Laats (BEL); W 0010–0000	Tommy Mortensen (DEN); W 0100–0000	Ivo Kostadinov (BUL); W 1000–0000	Arthur Cooper (NZL); W 0001–0000	Yosuke Yamamoto (JPN); W 1000–0000	BYE			Gyeong-Geun Lee (KOR); L 0000–0000	Silver medal
Wiesław Błach	−71 kg	Siao Chin Chong (HKG); W 1000–0000	Luiz Onmura (BRA); L 0000–0001	Did not advance							
Waldemar Legień	−78 kg	BYE	Walid Hussain (EGY); W 1000–0000	Dario Garcia Aguilar (ARG); W 1000–0000	Kevin Doherty (CAN); W 0100–0000	Baszir Warajew (URS); W 0000–0000	BYE			Frank Wieneke (FRG); W 1000–0000	Gold medal
Jacek Beutler	−95 kg	—N/a	BYE	Ahmed Barbach (MAR); W 0100–0000	Theodorus Meijer (NED); W 1000–0000	Marc Meiling (FRG); L 0000–0001	Robert Van De Valle (BEL); L 1000–0000	Did not advance			
Andrzej Basik	+95 kg	—N/a	Clemens Jehle (SUI); W 0010–0000	Helder Ina De Carvalho (ANG); W 1000–0000	Yong-Cheol Jo (KOR); L 0000–0010	Did not advance					

== Modern pentathlon ==
Three male pentathletes represented Poland in 1988.

Athlete	Event	Shooting (10 m air pistol)	Fencing (épée one touch)	Swimming (200 m freestyle)	Riding (show jumping)	Running (3000 m)	Total points	Final rank
Athlete	Event	Points	Points	Points	Points	Points	Total points	Final rank
Wiesław Chmielewski	Men's	576	847	1224	958	1096	4501	53
Maciej Czyżowicz	Men's	770	847	1308	1000	1123	5048	15
Arkadiusz Skrzypaszek	Men's	1040	660	1312	934	1036	4982	23
Wiesław Chmielewski; Maciej Czyżowicz; Arkadiusz Skrzypaszek	Team	2386	2354	3844	2692	3255	14531	9

== Rowing ==
Men

Athlete	Event	Heats		Repechage		Semifinals		Final	
Athlete	Event	Time	Rank	Time	Rank	Time	Rank	Time	Rank
Kajetan Broniewski	Single sculls	7:13.77	4 R	7:04.39	2 Q	7:03.90	3 Q	7:03.67	5
Wojciech Jankowski; Jacek Streich; Ireneusz Omięcki	Coxed pair	7:21.89	4 R	7:18.21	2 Q	7:13.48	5 FB	7:18.60	9
Sławomir Cieślakowski; Andrzej Krzepiński; Mirosław Mruk; Tomasz Świątek	Quadruple sculls	5:52.41	5 R	5:57.61	2 Q	5:57.32	3 FB	5:55.39	7

Women

Athlete	Event	Heats		Repechage		Semifinals		Final	
Athlete	Event	Time	Rank	Time	Rank	Time	Rank	Time	Rank
Elżbieta Jankowska; Zyta Jarka; Elwira Lorenz; Czesława Szczepińska; Grażyna Błąd-Kotwica	Coxed four	7:29.72	3 R	7:32.55	4 FB	—N/a		7:22.59	8

== Sailing ==
Men

Athlete	Event	Race							Net points	Final rank
Athlete	Event	1	2	3	4	5	6	7	Net points	Final rank
Grzegorz Myszkowski	Lechner Division II	16	6	~~24~~	14	16	19	22	128.7	17
Henryk Blaszka	Finn	18	19	10	~~23~~	16	20	8	127.0	20

== Shooting ==
Men

Athlete	Event	Qualification		Final	
Athlete	Event	Score	Rank	Score	Rank
Jerzy Greszkiewicz	50 metre running target	—N/a		584	12
Adam Kaczmarek	25 m rapid fire pistol	595	5 Q	691	5
Wojciech Karkusiewicz	50 metre running target	—N/a		582	15
Krzysztof Kucharczyk	25 m rapid fire pistol	591	11	Did not advance	
Jerzy Pietrzak	10 m air pistol	582	7 Q	678.3	7
Jerzy Pietrzak	50 m pistol	557	14	Did not advance	

Women

Athlete	Event	Qualification		Final	
Athlete	Event	Score	Rank	Score	Rank
Dorota Bidołach	25 m pistol	582	10	Did not advance	
Dorota Bidołach	10 m air pistol	378	12	Did not advance	

== Swimming ==
Men

Athlete	Event	Heat		Final B		Final	
Athlete	Event	Time	Rank	Time	Rank	Time	Rank
Mateusz Podkościelny	200 metre freestyle	1:50.95	14	1:51.63	14	Did not advance	
Mateusz Podkościelny	400 metre freestyle	3:49.51	1 OR	Did not advance		3:48.59	5
Mateusz Podkościelny	1500 metre freestyle	15:11.19	5	Did not advance		15:14.76	4
Rafał Szukała	100 metre butterfly	54.83	15	54.80	13	Did not advance	
Rafał Szukała	200 metre butterfly	2:01.91	17	Did not advance			
Artur Wojdat	200 metre freestyle	1:48.02	1	Did not advance		1:48.40	4
Artur Wojdat	400 metre freestyle	3:49.68	3	Did not advance		3:47.34	Bronze medal
Artur Wojdat	1500 metre freestyle	15:37.52	21	Did not advance			

Women

Athlete	Event	Heat		Final B		Final	
Athlete	Event	Time	Rank	Time	Rank	Time	Rank
Dorota Chylak	100 metre breaststroke	1:12.38	19	Did not advance			
Dorota Chylak	200 metre breaststroke	2:39.38	28	Did not advance			
Kornelia Stawicka	100 metre breaststroke	1:15.41	31	Did not advance			
Kornelia Stawicka	200 metre breaststroke	2:36.86	21	Did not advance			

== Table tennis ==
Athlete	Event	Group stage		Round of 32	Round of 16	Quarterfinals	Semifinals	Final	
Athlete	Event	Opposition Result	Opposition Result	Opposition Result	Opposition Result	Opposition Result	Opposition Result	Opposition Result	Rank
Andrzej Grubba	Men's singles	Q		Jörgen Persson (SWE); L1-3	Did not advance				
Leszek Kucharski	Men's singles	Q		Jan-Ove Waldner (SWE); L 2-3	Did not advance				
Andrzej Grubba; Leszek Kucharski	Men's doubles	Q		Chen Longcan / Wei Qingguang (CHN); L 1–2	Did not advance				

== Tennis ==
Men

Athlete	Event	Round of 64	Round of 32	Round of 16	Quarterfinals	Semifinals	Final / BM	
Athlete	Event	Opposition Score	Opposition Score	Opposition Score	Opposition Score	Opposition Score	Opposition Score	Rank
Wojciech Kowalski	Singles	Tony Mmoh (NGR); L 2–6, 4–6, 4-6	Did not advance					

== Weightlifting ==
Men

Athlete	Event	Snatch		Clean & jerk		Total	Rank
Athlete	Event	Result	Rank	Result	Rank	Total	Rank
Jacek Gutowski	−52 kg	112,5	3	135	5	247,5	5
Marek Seweryn	−67,5 kg	145	4	172,5	4	317,5	4
Waldemar Kosinski	−75 kg	152,5	5	180	6	332,5	6
Krzysztof Siemion	−82,5 kg	162,5	4	195	5	357,5	5
Sławomir Zawada	−90 kg	180	2	220	3	400	Bronze medal
Andrzej Piotrowski	−90 kg	165	5	220	4	365	4
Stanisław Małysa	−110 kg	180	7	215	8	395	7

== Wrestling ==
Men's freestyle

Athlete	Event	Elimination Pool								Final round	
Athlete	Event	Round 1 Result	Round 2 Result	Round 3 Result	Round 4 Result	Round 5 Result	Round 6 Result	Round 7 Result	Rank	Final round Result	Rank
Władysław Stecyk	−52 kg	Garba Lame (NGR); W 4–0	Surya Saputera (INA); W 4–0	Aslan Seyhanlı (TUR); L 1-3	Thierry Bourdin (FRA); W 3-1	Vladimir Toguzov (URS); L 0-4	—N/a		5	Did not advance	
Dariusz Grzywiński	−57 kg	Lawrence Holmes (CAN); L 1-3	Sergei Beloglazov (URS); L 0-4	—N/a					13	Did not advance	
Marian Skubacz	−62 kg	Ali Dad (AFG); W 3–1	Mika Lehto (FIN); W 3–1	John Smith (USA); L 1–3	Simeon Shterev (BUL); L 0–3	—N/a			7	Did not advance	
Andrzej Kubiak	−68 kg	René Neyer (SUI); W 3-1	Alexander Leipold (FRG); L 1-3	Khenmedekhiin Amaraa (BUL); L 1-3	—N/a				9	Did not advance	
Andrzej Radomski	−82 kg	Reiner Trik (FRG); L 1-3	Alexander Nanev (BUL); W 3-1	Mark Schultz (USA); L 1-3	—N/a				8	Did not advance	
Jerzy Nieć	−90 kg	Rumen Alabakov (BUL); L 1-3	Bodo Lukowski (FRG); L 1-3	—N/a					11	Did not advance	
Wojciech Wala	−100 kg	William Scherr (USA); L 0-4	Noel Loban (GBR); L 1-3	—N/a					8	Did not advance	
Adam Sandurski	−130 kg	Andreas Schröder (GDR); L 0-4	Ham Duk-Won (KOR); W 4-0	Dan Payne (CAN); W 4-3	Bruce Baumgartner (USA); L 0-4	BYE			4	Ralf Bremmer (FRG); W 3-1	7

Men's Greco-Roman

Athlete	Event	Elimination Pool								Final round	
Athlete	Event	Round 1 Result	Round 2 Result	Round 3 Result	Round 4 Result	Round 5 Result	Round 6 Result	Round 7 Result	Rank	Final round Result	Rank
Andrzej Głąb	−48 kg	Mahaddin Allahverdiyev (URS); W 3-1	Dov Groverman (ISR); W 3-1	József Faragó (HUN); W 3-0	Khaled Al-Faraj (SYR); W 3-1	BYE			1	Vincenzo Maenza (ITA); L 0-3	Silver medal
Roman Kierpacz	−52 kg	Csaba Vadász (HUN); W 3–0	Jon Rønningen (NOR); L 1-3	Hu Richa (CHN); W 3-1	Peter Stjernberg (SWE); W 3-1	BYE	Lee Jae-Suk (KOR); L 1-3	BYE	3	Tibor Jankovics (TCH); W 3-0	5
Ryszard Wolny	−57 kg	Yang Changling (CHN); L 1-3	Shunji Nakadome (JPN); L 0.5-3.5	—N/a					8	Did not advance	
Mieczysław Tracz	−62 kg	Isaac Anderson (USA); L 1-3	Brahim Loksairi (MAR); W 3-0	Kamandar Madzhidov (URS); L 0-3	—N/a				6	Did not advance	
Jerzy Kopański	−68 kg	Sümer Koçak (TUR); W 3-0	Attila Repka (HUN); W 3-0	Lars Lagerborg (SWE); W DQ	Georgi Karamanliev (BUL); W 3-0	Levon Julfalakyan (HUN); L 0-4	—N/a		3	Yasuhiro Okubo (JPN); W 3-0	5
Józef Tracz	−74 kg	David Butler (USA); W 3-1	Óscar Sánchez (ESP); W 4-0	Franc Podlesek (YUG); L 0-3	Hiromichi Ito (JPN); W 3-1	Kim Young-Nam (KOR); W DQ	BYE	—N/a	2	János Takács (HUN); W 3-0	Bronze medal
Bogdan Daras	−82 kg	Ernesto Razzino (ITA); W 3-1	Ubaldo Rodríguez (PUR); W 4-0	Mikhail Mamiashvili (URS); L 0-3	Goran Kasum (YUG); L 0-3	—N/a			4	John Morgan (USA); L 0-4	8
Andrzej Malina	−90 kg	Franz Pitschmann (BUL); L 0-4	Yasutoshi Moriyama (JPN); W 3-0	Christer Gulldén (SWE); L 0-3	—N/a				7	Did not advance	
Andrzej Wroński	−100 kg	BYE	Steve Marshall (CAN); W 3-0	Guram Gedekhauri (URS); L 0-4	Jožef Tertei (YUG); W 3-0	Vasile Andrei (ROU); W 3-0	Dennis Koslowski (USA); W 3-0	BYE	1	Gerhard Himmel (FRG); W 3-1	Gold medal
Roman Wrocławski	−130 kg	Fabio Valguarnera (ITA); L 0-0	Daniel Payne (CAN); W 4-0	Rangel Gerovski (BUL); L 0-3	BYE				4	Duane Koslowski (USA); W 4-0	7
