= Boxing at the 1988 Summer Olympics – Light heavyweight =

Olympic boxing tournament

Light heavyweight boxing at the Games of the XXIV Olympiad
- Venue: Jamsil Students' Gymnasium
- Dates: 21 September – 2 October 1988
- Competitors: 26 from 26 nations

Medalists
1st place, gold medalist(s)		Andrew Maynard	United States
2nd place, silver medalist(s)		Nurmagomed Shanavazov	Soviet Union
3rd place, bronze medalist(s)		Damir Škaro	Yugoslavia
3rd place, bronze medalist(s)		Henryk Petrich	Poland

The men's light heavyweight event was part of the boxing programme at the 1988 Summer Olympics. The weight class allowed boxers of up to 81 kilograms to compete. The competition was held from 21 September to 2 October 1988. 26 boxers from 26 nations competed. Having started boxing just four years prior, Andrew Maynard won the gold medal.

== Medalists ==
Gold	Andrew Maynard; United States
Silver	Nurmagomed Shanavazov; Soviet Union
Bronze	Damir Škaro; Yugoslavia
Bronze	Henryk Petrich; Poland

== Results ==
The following boxers took part in the event:

Rank	Name	Country
1	Andrew Maynard	United States
2	Nurmagomed Shanavazov	Soviet Union
3T	Damir Škaro	Yugoslavia
3T	Henryk Petrich	Poland
5T	Lajos Erős	Hungary
5T	Ahmed El-Nagar	Egypt
5T	Joseph Akhasamba	Kenya
5T	Andrea Magi	Italy
9T	Nelson Adams	Puerto Rico
9T	Mika Masoe	American Samoa
9T	Chris Collins	Grenada
9T	Niels Madsen	Denmark
9T	Osmond Imadiyi	Nigeria
9T	Sione Vaveni Talia'uli	Tonga
9T	Brent Kosolofski	Canada
9T	Markus Bott	West Germany
17T	Terry Dixon	Jamaica
17T	Park Byeong-jin	South Korea
17T	Rund Kanika	Zaire
17T	Deyan Kirilov	Bulgaria
17T	Tommy Bauro	Solomon Islands
17T	Jeffrey Nedd	Aruba
17T	Pua Ulberg	Western Samoa
17T	Ahmed El-Masri	Lebanon
17T	René Suetovius	East Germany
17T	Patrick Lihanda	Uganda

=== First round ===
- Ahmed El-Naggar (EGY) def. Hudson Nanton (SVI), walk-over
- Niels Madsen (DEN) def. Terry Dixon (JAM), RSC-2
- Henryk Petrich (POL) def. Park Byun-Jin (KOR), RSC-2
- Osmond Imadiyi (NGA) def. Rund Kanika (ZAI), KO-1
- Damir Škaro (YUG) def. Deyan Kirilov (BUL), 3:2
- Sione Vaveni Talia'uli (TNG) def. Tommy Bauro (SIS), KO-1
- Joseph Akhasamba (KEN) def. Jeffrey Nedd (ARU), RSC-2
- Andrea Magi (ITA) def. Pua Ulberg (SAM), 5:0
- Brent Kosolofski (CAN) def. Ahmed el-Masri (LEB), RSC-3
- Markus Bott (FRG) def. René Suetovius (GDR), RSC-3
- Nurmagomed Shanavazov (URS) def. Patrick Lihanda (UGA), 3:2

=== Second round ===
- Lajos Eros (HUN) def. Nelson Adams (PUR), 4:1
- Andrew Maynard (USA) def. Mika Masoe (ASA), RSC-2
- Ahmed El-Naggar (EGY) def. Chris Collins (GRN), 5:0
- Henryk Petrich (POL) def. Niels Madsen (DEN), 5:0
- Damir Škaro (YUG) def. Osmond Imadiyi (NGA), 5:0
- Joseph Akhasamba (KEN) def. Sione Vaveni Talia'uli (TNG), 5:0
- Andrea Magi (ITA) def. Brent Kosolofski (CAN), 4:1
- Nurmagomed Shanavazov (URS) def. Markus Bott (FRG), 5:0

=== Quarterfinals ===
- Andrew Maynard (USA) def. Lajos Eros (HUN), 5:0
- Henryk Petrich (POL) def. Ahmed Elnaggar (EGY), 5:0
- Damir Škaro (YUG) def. Joseph Akhasamba (KEN), 5:0
- Nurmagomed Shanavazov (URS) def. Andrea Magi (ITA), 5:0

=== Semifinals ===
- Andrew Maynard (USA) def. Henryk Petrich (POL), AB-3
- Nurmagomed Shanavazov (URS) def. Damir Škaro (YUG), walk-over

=== Final ===
- Andrew Maynard (USA) def. Nurmagomed Shanavazov (URS), 5:0
