= Boxing at the 1988 Summer Olympics – Welterweight =

Olympic boxing tournament

Welterweight boxing at the Games of the XXIV Olympiad
- Venue: Jamsil Students' Gymnasium
- Dates: 20 September – 1 October 1988
- Competitors: 44 from 44 nations

Medalists
1st place, gold medalist(s)		Robert Wangila	Kenya
2nd place, silver medalist(s)		Laurent Boudouani	France
3rd place, bronze medalist(s)		Jan Dydak	Poland
3rd place, bronze medalist(s)		Kenneth Gould	United States

The men's welterweight event was part of the boxing programme at the 1988 Summer Olympics. The weight class allowed boxers of up to 67 kilograms to compete. The competition was held from 20 September to 1 October 1988. 44 boxers from 44 nations competed. Robert Wangila won the gold medal.

== Medalists ==
Gold	Robert Wangila; Kenya
Silver	Laurent Boudouani; France
Bronze	Jan Dydak; Poland
Bronze	Kenneth Gould; United States

== Results ==
The following boxers took part in the event:

Rank	Name	Country
1	Robert Wangila	Kenya
2	Laurent Boudouani	France
3T	Jan Dydak	Poland
3T	Kenneth Gould	United States
5T	Adewale Adegbusi	Nigeria
5T	Khristo Furnigov	Bulgaria
5T	Song Gyeong-seop	South Korea
5T	Joni Nyman	Finland
9T	Javier Martínez	Spain
9T	Humberto Aranda	Costa Rica
9T	Abdoukerim Hamidou	Togo
9T	Khaidavyn Gantulga	Mongolia
9T	Darren Obah	Australia
9T	Siegfried Mehnert	East Germany
9T	Maselino Masoe	American Samoa
9T	Dimus Chisala	Zambia
17T	Daryl Joseph	Antigua and Barbuda
17T	Lucas Sinoia	Mozambique
17T	José García	Venezuela
17T	Asomua Naea	Western Samoa
17T	Francisc Vaştag	Romania
17T	Gregory Griffith	Barbados
17T	Đorđe Petronijević	Yugoslavia
17T	Richard Hamilton	Jamaica
17T	Imre Bácskai	Hungary
17T	Abdullah Salim Al-Barwani	Oman
17T	Alexander Künzler	West Germany
17T	Abdellah Taouane	Morocco
17T	Fidèle Mohinga	Central African Republic
17T	Alfred Ankamah	Ghana
17T	Sören Antman	Sweden
17T	Vladimir Yereshchenko	Soviet Union
33T	Kasmiro Omona	Uganda
33T	Billy Walsh	Ireland
33T	Đỗ Tiến Tuấn	Vietnam
33T	Lionel Ortíz	Puerto Rico
33T	Adão N'Zuzi	Angola
33T	Pedro Fria	Dominican Republic
33T	Boston Simbeye	Malawi
33T	Joseph Marwa	Tanzania
33T	Isimeli Lesivakarua	Fiji
33T	Manny Sobral	Canada
33T	Yoshiaki Takahashi	Japan
33T	Wanderley Oliveira	Brazil

=== First round ===
- Alexander Künzler (FRG) def. Kasmiro Omona (UGA), 5:0
- Song Kyung-Sup (KOR) def. William Walsh (IRL), RSC-2
- Abdellah Taouane (MAR) def. Đỗ Tiến Tuấn (VIE), 5:0
- Siegfried Mehnert (GDR) def. José Ortiz (PUR), 5:0
- Fidele Mohinga (RCA) def. Adão Nzuzi (ANG), 5:0
- Maselino Masoe (ASA) def. Pedro Fria (DOM), RSC-1
- Alfred Addo Ankamah (GHA) def. Boston Simbeye (MLW), KO-1
- Kenneth Gould (USA) def. Joseph Marwa (TNZ), 4:1
- Sören Antman (SWE) def. Isimeli Lesivakarua (FIJ), RSC-2
- Joni Nyman (FIN) def. Manuel Sobral (CAN), 4:1
- Vladimir Ereshchenko (URS) def. Yoshiaki Takahashi (JPN), 5:0
- Dimus Chisala (ZAM) def. Wanderley Oliveira (BRA), RSC-2

=== Second round ===
- Adewale Adgebusi (NGA) def. Joseph Dary (ANT), KO-1
- Javier Martínez (ESP) def. Lucas Januario (MOZ), 5:0
- Jan Dydak (POL) def. José García (VEN), 4:1
- Humberto Aranda (COS) def. Asomua Naea (SAM), RSC-2
- Abdoukerim Hamidou (TOG) def. Francisc Vaştag (ROU), DSQ-3
- Khristo Furnigov (BUL) def. Gregory Griffiths (BRB), KO-1
- Robert Wangila (KEN) def. Đorđe Petronijević (YUG), RSC-2
- Khaidavyn Gantulga (MGL) def. Richard Hamilton (JAM), RSC-2
- Laurent Boudouani (FRA) def. Imre Bacskai (HUN), 4:1
- Darren Obah (AUS) def. Abdullah al-Barwani (OMA), RSC-3
- Song Kyung-Sup (KOR) def. Alexander Künzler (FRG), 5:0
- Siegfried Mehnert (GDR) def. Abdellah Taouane (MAR), 5:0
- Maselino Masoe (ASA) def. Fidele Mohinga (RCA), RSC-2
- Kenneth Gould (USA) def. Alfred Addo Ankamah (GHA), 5:0
- Joni Nyman (FIN) def. Sören Antman (SWE), 5:0
- Dimus Chisala (ZAM) def. Vladimir Ereshchenko (URS), RSC-1

=== Third round ===
- Adewale Adgebusi (NGA) def. Javier Martínez (ESP), 5:0
- Jan Dydak (POL) def. Humberto Aranda (COS), 4:1
- Khristo Furnigov (BUL) def. Abdoukerim Hamidou (TOG), 5:0
- Robert Wangila (KEN) def. Khaidavyn Gantulga (MGL), AB-2
- Laurent Boudouani (FRA) def. Darren Obah (AUS), 5:0
- Song Kyung-Sup (KOR) def. Siegfried Mehnert (GDR), 3:2
- Kenneth Gould (USA) def. Maselino Masoe (ASA), 5:0
- Joni Nyman (FIN) def. Dimus Chisala (ZAM), 5:0

=== Quarterfinals ===
- Jan Dydak (POL) def. Adewale Adgebusi (NGA), 4:1
- Robert Wangila (KEN) def. Khristo Furnigov (BUL), 5:0
- Laurent Boudouani (FRA) def. Song Kyung-Sup (KOR), 3:2
- Kenneth Gould (USA) def. Joni Nyman (FIN), 5:0

=== Semifinals ===
- Robert Wangila (KEN) def. Jan Dydak (POL), walk-over
- Laurent Boudouani (FRA) def. Kenneth Gould (USA), 4:1

=== Final ===
- Robert Wangila (KEN) def. Laurent Boudouani (FRA), KO-2
