= Nurmagomed Shanavazov =

Russian boxer

Personal information
- Born: February 19, 1965 (age 61) Gubden, Karabudakhkentsky District, Dagestan ASSR, Russian SFSR, Soviet Union
Medal record
Men's amateur boxing
Representing the Soviet Union
Olympic Games
Silver medal – second place	1988 Seoul	Light heavyweight
Goodwill Games
Gold medal – first place	1986 Moscow	Light heavyweight
World Championships
Bronze medal – third place	1989 Moscow	Light heavyweight
European Championships
Gold medal – first place	1985 Budapest	Light heavyweight

Nurmagomed Magomedsandovich Shanavazov (Russian: Нурмагомед Магомедсандович Шанавазов) (born February 19, 1965), is a Soviet Russian former boxer. He is best known for handing Riddick Bowe his first defeat at an international competition. An ethnic Dargin hailing from Dagestan, Shanavazov won the Light Heavyweight Silver medal at the 1988 Summer Olympics for the Soviet Union. He was training at the Dynamo sports society in Makhachkala.

== Amateur career ==
At the Soviet-Cuban joint pre-Olympic training camp in Sukhumi, Georgian SSR, set for the 1988 Olympics, he sparred with Félix Savón, constantly staggering him with devastating bodyshot flurries at close range. They never met again though as Shanavazov was in the lighter weight class.

=== Olympic Results ===
- Defeated Patrick Lihanda (Uganda) by majority decision, 4–1
- Defeated Markus Bott (West Germany) by majority decision, 4–1
- Defeated Andrea Magi (Italy) by majority decision, 4–1
- Defeated Damir Škaro (Yugoslavia) by walkover
- Lost to Andrew Maynard (United States) by unanimous decision, 0–5

== Professional career ==
Because of poor management and poor performance Shanavazov had no success as a professional. He turned pro in 1990 and also retired that same year, finishing with a record of three fights, zero wins.

== Professional boxing record ==
2 Losses (1 knockout, 1 decision), 1 Draw
Record	Result	Opponent	Type	Round	Date	Location	Notes
0–2–1	Loss	(Soviet Union) Sergei Kobozev	KO	2 (8)	3 Nov 1990	(Soviet Union) Sport Palace Gornyak, Rudniy, Kazakh SSR, USSR	
0–1–1	Draw	(Soviet Union) Sergei Kobozev	PTS	8	30 Sep 1990	(Soviet Union) Rostov-on-Don, RSFSR, USSR	
0–1	Loss	(Zaire) Rund Kanika	PTS	6	23 Apr 1990	Nogent-sur-Marne, France	
