= Ivanek =

Ivanek is a Croatian surname. The root of the word is the masculine given name Ivan.

The surname is found in Croatia with 214 holders, located mostly in Central Croatia.

The surname is found in Slovenia with 68 holders, making it the 6,093rd most frequent surname, mostly in the Mura Statistical Region where it is the 612th most frequent surname.

It may refer to:

- Ferdo Ivanek (1923–2021), American engineer of Slovenian and Croatian origin
- Vladimir Ivanek (born 1980), Bosnian Croat table tennis player and coach
- Željko Ivanek (born 1957), American actor of Slovenian and Croatian origin

== See also ==
- Iwanek
- Ivánek
- Ivanec (disambiguation)
