= Terry Dixon (disambiguation) =

Terry Dixon is an English born, Irish footballer.

Terry Dixon may also refer to:

- Terry Dixon (artist) (1969–2019), American artist
- Terry Dixon (boxer) (born 1966), Jamaican boxer
