= Damir Škaro =

Croatian boxer and politician

Personal information
- Born: 2 November 1959 (age 66) Zagreb, PR Croatia, Yugoslavia
Medal record
Men's Boxing
Representing Yugoslavia
Olympic Games
Bronze medal – third place	1988 Seoul	Light Heavyweight
World championships
Bronze medal – third place	1986 Reno	Light Heavyweight kg
Mediterranean Games
Gold medal – first place	1987 Latakia	Light Heavyweight

Damir Škaro (born 2 November 1959) is a former Croatian amateur boxer. He won the Light Heavyweight Bronze medal at the 1988 Olympic Games in Seoul for Yugoslavia, as well as a Croatian politician. He also competed at the 1980 Olympic Games and the 1984 Olympic Games.

Škaro was elected into the Croatian Parliament in 1995 as a member of the Croatian Democratic Union.

Škaro has served as the secretary of the Croatian Olympians Club.

In September 2019, he was arrested by Croatian authorities on suspicion of sexual misconduct and alleged rape of his female secretary at Autoklub Siget, where he had served as president since 2004. In order to prevent him from witness tampering he was immediately admitted to prison for a 30-day pre-trial custody period, while the criminal case against him was being prepared by state attorneys. The case was widely publicized in Croatian news media and led to his resignation as President of Autoklub Siget only a week later. In April 2024, at the age of 64, he was found guilty of rape and sentenced to 30 months in prison.

== 1980 Olympic results ==
Category: Middleweight

- Round of 32: lost to Viktor Savchenko (Soviet Union) after the referee stopped the bout

== 1984 Olympic Games ==
Category: Middleweight

- Round of 32: Defeated Ahmed El-Gindy (Egypt) after the referee stopped the bout
- Round of 16: Defeated Antonio Corti (Argentina) 4-1
- Quarterfinal: Lost to Virgil Hill (United States) 1-4

== 1988 Olympic Games ==
Category: Light heavyweight

- Round of 32: Defeated Deyan Kirilov (Bulgaria) 3-2
- Round of 16: Defeated Osmond Imadiyi (Nigeria) 5-0
- Quarterfinal: Defeated Joseph Akhasamba (Kenya) 5-0
- Semifinal: Lost to Nuramgomed Shanavazov (Soviet Union) by walkover (was awarded bronze medal)
