= Don Diego Poeder =

Dutch boxer

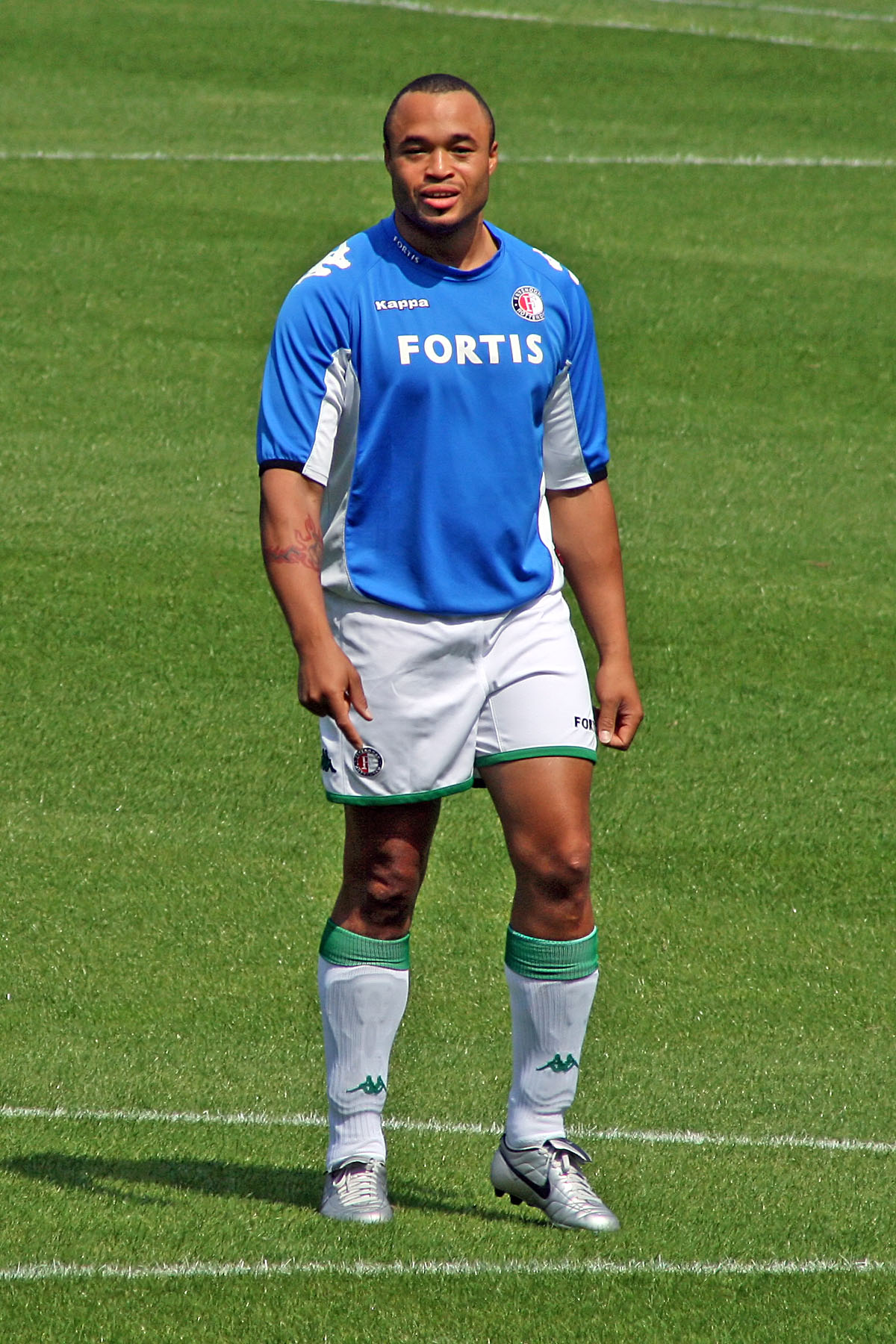
- Poeder in 2007

Personal information
- Nationality: Dutch
- Born: Don Diego Rivelino Alfredo Poeder; 3 April 1972 (age 54) Rotterdam, Netherlands
- Height: 6 ft 1 in (185 cm)
- Weight: Heavyweight

Boxing career
- Reach: 78 in (198 cm)
- Stance: Orthodox

Boxing record
- Total fights: 33
- Wins: 27
- Win by KO: 20
- Losses: 6
- Draws: 0
Medal record
Men's amateur boxing
Representing Netherlands
European Championships
Silver medal – second place	1993 Bursa	Heavyweight

Don Diego Rivelino Alfredo Poeder (born 3 April 1972) is a former Dutch professional boxer. After his pro debut in 1994, Poeder was undefeated for 21 consecutive boxing matches. He gained the WBU cruiserweight title with a knock out over American Terry Ray in 1997, defending it once against Courtney Butler before falling to former world champion Robert Daniels in a bid for the IBO title.

== Early life ==
Poeder was born on the 3rd of April 1972 in Rotterdam. He grew up in the Spangen neighbourhood in Rotterdam and later moved to Westkruiskade in the same city.

At the age of 16 Poeder decided to pursue kickboxing, and sought to join a kickboxing school in Rotterdam.

== Amateur career ==
Poeder joined the kickboxing school Silent Dragon Holland in 1988, having as a trainer Enric Gunning, the bronze medal winner at the first world kickboxing championship, the W.A.K.O. World Championships in 1978.

During his time at Silent Dragon Holland he realized that kickboxing was too demanding for his weak knees. Poeder later received corrective surgery on his knee. Gunning saw the potential in Poeder and agreed to train him for boxing. His training here lasted until 1991. During this time Gunning organized 3 boxing matches for Poeder. Poeder fought in an amateur boxing competition in the heavyweight class.

Poeder ended up at the Hoboken boxing school (renamed Leon's Boxing Gym), a school owned by former Dutch professional boxer Aad Jansen – triple Dutch welterweight champion. During his years at the Hoboken boxing school Poeder had the chance to train directly with the experienced Aad Jansen - his first official boxing trainer and Wim van Klaveren (brother of Bep van Klaveren - the only Dutch boxer to have won an Olympic gold medal). Poeder remained for a period of 2 years at Hoboken boxing school with approximately 15 matches as an amateur. While training at Hoboken, Poeder became the Dutch amateur boxing champion in the heavyweight category in 1992.

One year later in 1993 Poeder repeated his performance and won for the second time the Dutch amateur title in the heavyweight category. This time Poeder trained at the boxing school Boxing '82 Rotterdam under the guidance of the trainer Frans van den Heerik.

Poeder made his international debut in 1993 at European Amateur Boxing Championships in Bursa, Turkey and his performance resulted in a silver medal for The Netherlands. In the fight for the silver medal in the heavyweight category, he knocked out Danny Williams in the first round.

In the same year Poeder participated at the 14th Copenhagen Cup - Copenhagen, Denmark - November 1993, in the heavyweight class. During this championship, on November 26, 1993, Poeder scored a first-round knockout victory over Wladimir Klitschko in the semifinals (being the only boxer to stop him in amateurs, before Ross Puritty repeated Poeder's successful performance over Klitschko in 1998, and the only boxer to ever stop him in the first round), losing the finals to Juan Carlos Gómez.

=== Highlights ===
(silver) Copenhagen Cup, Copenhagen, Denmark, November 1993:

- 1/2: Defeated Wladimir Klitschko (Ukraine) RSC 1
- Finals: Lost to Juan Carlos Gómez (Cuba) 4–15

(silver) European Championships, Bursa, Turkey, September 1993:

- 1/8: Defeated Ion Mihai (Romania) RSC 1
- 1/4: Defeated Krzysztof Rojek (Poland) RSC 2
- 1/2: Defeated Danny Williams (England) KO 1
- Finals: Lost to Georgi Kandelaki (Georgia) 2–11

== Professional career ==
After a successful 1993 and a titles-full amateur period (double Dutch champion and silver medal at the European Championship) Poeder followed the advice of his friends (and professional boxers) Raymond Joval (“Halleluja”) and Regilio Benito Tuur (“Turbo”) and went to the United States to train for a two-month period. In the United States Poeder trained at Gleason's gym in New York, a boxing gym with tradition located in Brooklyn. Some of the fighters who have trained at Gleason's gym include Jake LaMotta, Roberto Durán, Benny "Kid" Paret, Paulie Malignaggi, Gerry Coone, Muhammad Ali and Mike Tyson.

Soon after his arrival back in Rotterdam Poeder was followed by the famous boxing manager Stan Hoffman – known for training several world champions, among them James Toney, Hasim Rahman, Michael Bentt, Lucia Rijker and, later, Poeder. Hoffman met Poeder in Dudok in Rotterdam in a very informal sphere and on a table napkin drew up what became Poeder's professional boxing career.

Poeder agreed to move to the United States, with Hoffman as trainer and aiming for a career as a pro. His professional boxing debut took place in 1994 at the Rotterdam Ahoy. The fight was in the cruiserweight class in the professional boxing league, the weightc lass where Poeder would fight as a professional for the rest of his boxing career. Poeder won the fight at the Ahoy against Ken Woods by KO in the third round.

The match in Rotterdam was the first of 21 undefeated boxing matches for Poeder. From one victory to another between 1994 and 1997, Poeder climbed the stairs of success, culminating in winning the World Boxing Union (original 1995–2004) cruiserweight title on 15 June 1997. In this matchup, Poeder knocked Terry Ray out in the third round winning the fight through a technical knock-out (TKO).

The TKO and the KO were Poeder's characteristic manner of winning a fight during his pro career. According to official records, Poeder won an overwhelming 80% of his fights through TKO or KO during his professional boxing career. The distribution of these techniques in these wins is 50% (TKO) -50% (KO).

The city of Rotterdam acknowledged Poeder's performance and awarded him the title of Rotterdam's Sportsman of the Year 1997.

Poeder successfully defended the World Boxing Union cruiserweight title against Courtney Butler in September 1997, confirming once again his world champion status.

In 1998 Poeder faced a period of decline in his boxing career and lost his first professional fight while competing for the vacant International Boxing Organization World Cruiserweight Title.

Poeder was not seen again in the boxing ring from 1999 until 2004. He won 3 major fights in a row, culminating with the Dutch cruiserweight title on 10 September 2005. Although this was not the official end of Poeder's boxing career, the fights that followed the Dutch cruiserweight title were title-less fights and with a local rather than international status (took place in The Netherlands or Belgium). His official retirement match took place in 2016.

== Professional record ==
Date	Opponent	Opp Record	Location	Result	Method
18/04/1994	Ken Woods	0-1-0	Rotterdam Ahoy Sportpaleis, Rotterdam, Netherlands	W	KO
02/06/1994	Chuck Miller	debut	Huntington Hilton Hotel, Melville, New York, USA	W	KO
26/08/1994	Alonzo Hollis	1-1-0	Ballys Park Place Hotel Casino, Atlantic City, New Jersey, USA	W	PTS
24/09/1994	Dimitri Ostraiano	debut	Rotterdam Ahoy Sportpaleis, Rotterdam, Netherlands	W	KO
23/01/1995	Lajos Erős	6-3-1	World Trade Center, Rotterdam, Netherlands	W	PTS
09/03/1995	Francisco Borja	1-1-0	Martinihal, Groningen, Netherlands	W	KO
17/06/1995	LaVelle Stanley	4-10-0	Performing Arts Theater, New Orleans, Louisiana, USA	W	TKO
21/07/1995	Wesley Martin	3-2-2	Harrah's Casino, New Orleans, Louisiana, USA	W	UD
16/09/1995	Jules Pierre	debut	Sportcentrum Valkenhuizen, Arnhem, Netherlands	W	KO
06/10/1995	Tony Booth	18-29-6	Waregem, West-Vlaanderen, Belgium	W	TKO
23/12/1995	Karoly Kovacs	2-4-0	RAI, Amsterdam, Netherlands	W	TKO
28/02/1996	Domingo Monroe	8-4-0	Foxwoods Resort, Mashantucket, Connecticut, USA	W	KO
01/04/1996	Franck Guilmot	9-5-0	Sporthal Maaspoort, Den Bosch, Netherlands	W	TKO
03/06/1996	Rund Kanika	13-9-1	Indoorsportcentrum, Eindhoven, Netherlands	W	KO
09/08/1996	Gary Durr	3-3-1	Casino Magic, Bay Saint Louis, Mississippi, USA	W	TKO
17/12/1996	John Andrade	19-1-0	World Trade Center, Rotterdam, Netherlands	W	TKO
04/02/1997	Lenzie Morgan	14-19-3	World Trade Center, Rotterdam, Netherlands	W	PTS
12/04/1997	John Kiser	10-15-2	Tropicana Hotel & Casino, Las Vegas, Nevada, USA	W	TKO
15/06/1997	Terry Ray	34-4-0	Foxwoods Resort, Mashantucket, Connecticut, USA	W	TKO
26/09/1997	Courtney Butler	17-2-1	Claridge Hotel & Casino, Atlantic City, New Jersey, USA	W	UD
08/02/1998	Terry Porter	10-2-1	Harrah's Casino, Lake Charles, Louisiana, USA	W	UD
05/05/1998	Robert Daniels	37-3-1	Grand Casino, Biloxi, Mississippi, USA	L	KO
29/01/1999	Sajad Abdul Aziz	11-6-4	Foxwoods Resort, Mashantucket, Connecticut, USA	L	TKO
08/05/2004	Petr Horacek	7-7-2	Topsportcentrum, Rotterdam, Netherlands	W	KO
26/03/2005	Kostyantyn Pryziuk	10-9-1	Topsportcentrum, Rotterdam, Netherlands	W	TKO
10/09/2005	John Keeton	25-12-0	Topsportcentrum, Rotterdam, Netherlands	W	KO
25/12/2005	Ismail Abdoul	25-9-1	Sporthal, Izegem, West-Vlaanderen, Belgium	L	UD
23/04/2006	Ismail Abdoul	26-9-1	't Kuipke, Ghent, Oost-Vlaanderen, Belgium	L	UD
02/06/2007	Andre Janssens	5-0-0	IJssporthal, Tilburg, Netherlands	L	KO
08/10/2007	Yaroslav Zavorotnyi	8-2-0	Theater Carré, Amsterdam, Netherlands	L	TKO
29/04/2012	Daniil Peretyatko	17-30-0	Topsportcentrum, Rotterdam, Netherlands	W	TKO
26/05/2014	Edgars Kalnars	25-28-0	Topsportcentrum, Rotterdam, Netherlands	W	UD
14/12/2014	Ivan Tomo	debut	Sporthal Drenkwaard, Zuidland, Netherlands	W	KO

== Charity ==
In 2014 Poeder organized with Nouchka Fontijn an open training session for boxing fans. The revenue from this event was donated to the 3FM Serious Request cause. In 2012 he conducted a training session with Frank, a fan of Poeder with a critical lung condition, at the Erasmus Medical Centre in Rotterdam.

In 2007 Poeder attended the global edition of Dancing With the Stars.
