= Laurent Boudouani =

French boxer (born 1966)

Personal information
- Nationality: French
- Born: Laurent Boudouani; 29 December 1966 (age 59) Sallanches, France
- Height: 5 ft 9 1/2 in (177 cm)
- Weight: Light middleweight

Boxing career
- Reach: 74 in (188 cm)
- Stance: Orthodox

Boxing record
- Total fights: 42
- Wins: 38
- Win by KO: 32
- Losses: 3
- Draws: 1
Medal record
Men's boxing
Representing France
Olympic Games
Silver medal – second place	1988 Seoul	Welterweight

Laurent Boudouani (born 29 December 1966 in Sallanches) is a French former professional boxer who competed from 1989 to 1999. He held the WBA light middleweight title from 1996 to 1999 and the European light middleweight title from 1992 to 1993. As an amateur, he won a silver medal in the welterweight event at the 1988 Summer Olympics. He holds wins over five world champions such as Terry Norris, Carl Daniels, Julio Cesar Vasquez, Javier Castillejo and Guillermo Jones.

== Olympic results ==
- 1st round bye
- Defeated Imre Bacskai (Hungary) 4-1
- Defeated Darren Obah (Australia) 5-0
- Defeated Song Kyung-Sup (South Korea) 3-2
- Defeated Kenneth Gould (United States) 4-1
- Lost to Robert Wangila (Kenya) KO by 2

== Professional career ==
Boudouani turned professional in 1989 and had two early victories over future titlist Javier Castillejo prior to capturing the WBA Light Middleweight Title by defeating Julio César Vásquez by fifth-round KO. Boudouani successfully defended his title four times, including victories over Carl Daniels, Guillermo Jones, and boxing great Terry Norris. Boudouani lost his title to Olympian David Reid in 1999 by unanimous decision and retired after the bout.

== Professional boxing record ==
42 fights	38 wins	3 losses
By knockout	32	2
By decision	5	1
By disqualification	1	0
Draws	1	

No.	Result	Record	Opponent	Type	Round, time	Date	Location	Notes
42	Loss	38–3–1	(United States) David Reid	UD	12	1999-03-06	(United States) Convention Center, Atlantic City	Lost WBA light-middleweight title
41	Win	38–2–1	(United States) Terry Norris	TKO	9	1998-11-30	(France) Palais des Sports, Paris	Retained WBA light-middleweight title
40	Win	37–2–1	(Panama) Guillermo Jones	SD	12	1998-05-30	(United States) Hilton Hotel, Las Vegas	Retained WBA light-middleweight title
39	Draw	36–2–1	(Panama) Guillermo Jones	PTS	12	1998-02-13	(United States) University Arena, Albuquerque	Retained WBA light-middleweight title
38	Win	36–2	(United States) Kevin Pompey	PTS	8	1997-12-17	(France) Thiais	
37	Win	35–2	(United States) Carl Daniels	UD	12	29 Mar 1997	(United States) Hilton Hotel, Las Vegas	Retained WBA light-middleweight title
36	Win	34–2	(United States) Benji Singleton	TKO	4	1996-12-14	(United States) Convention Center, Atlantic City	
35	Win	33–2	(Argentina) Julio César Vásquez	KO	5	1996-08-21	(France) La Palestre, Le Cannet	Won WBA light-middleweight title
34	Win	32–2	(Ukraine) Viktor Fesechko	KO	3	1996-07-05	(France) Espace 3000, Hyeres	
33	Win	31–2	(Dominican Republic) Jorge Ramírez	KO	5	1996-05-18	(France) Saint-Nazaire	
32	Win	30–2	(Spain) Javier Castillejo	UD	12	1996-01-06	(France) Palais des sports Marcel-Cerdan, Levallois-Perret	Retained European light middleweight title
31	Win	29–2	(Belgium) Patrick Vungbo	TKO	6	1995-06-27	(France) Palais des sports Marcel-Cerdan, Levallois-Perret	Retained European light middleweight title
30	Win	28–2	(Spain) Javier Castillejo	TKO	9	1995-01-03	(France) Epernay	Won European light middleweight title
29	Win	27–2	(France) Guy Vaste	TKO	3	1994-11-25	(France) Hayange	
28	Win	26–2	(Panama) Antonio Campbell	KO	3	1994-06-24	(France) Orléans	
27	Win	25–2	(Belgium) Marino Monteyne	TKO	5	1994-04-22	(France) Voiron	
26	Loss	24–2	(France) Bernard Razzano	TKO	8	1993-10-05	(France) Dijon	Lost European light middleweight title
25	Win	24–1	(United Kingdom) Andy Till	KO	4	1993-06-23	(United Kingdom) Picketts Lock Stadium, Edmonton	Retained European light middleweight title
24	Win	23–1	(Italy) Romolo Casamonica	KO	9	1993-04-03	(France) Soissons	Retained European light middleweight title
23	Win	22–1	(France) Jean-Claude Fontana	KO	3	1992-11-29	(France) Dijon	Won European light middleweight title
22	Win	21–1	(Dominican Republic) Cruz Ramos	TKO	2	1992-09-07	(France) Laval	
21	Win	20–1	(United States) Rick Haynes	KO	3	1992-04-17	(France) Gap	
20	Win	19–1	(United States) Anthony Ivory	PTS	8	1992-01-24	(France) Gennevilliers	
19	Win	18–1	(United States) Clarence White	KO	3	1991-12-20	Palau de Gel d'Andorra, Canillo	
18	Win	17–1	(United States) Willie Perry	KO	4	1991-11-22	(France) Complex Sport le COMEP, Epernay	
17	Win	16–1	(United States) Mack Brown	KO	3	1991-09-27	(France) Chenove	
16	Loss	15–1	(United States) Gilbert Baptist	TKO	8	1991-07-05	(France) Autun	
15	Win	15–0	(Dominican Republic) James Sudberry	KO	1	1991-06-14	(France) Reims	
14	Win	14–0	(Colombia) Horacio Pérez	KO	4	1990-12-15	(France) Vichy	
13	Win	13–0	(United States) Jake Torrance	KO	3	1990-10-20	(France) Laon	
12	Win	12–0	(Democratic Republic of the Congo) Jean-Pierre Iniama	KO	5	1990-08-11	(France) Le Cap d'Agde	
11	Win	11–0	(Belgium) Freddy Demeulenaere	TKO	2	1990-07-13	(France) Patinoire d'Annecy, Annecy	
10	Win	10–0	(Ivory Coast) Karim Ouattara	KO	1	1990-05-19	(France) Montpellier	
9	Win	9–0	(France) Jean Louis Marcopena	KO	4	1990-04-06	(France) Port Marchand, Toulon	
8	Win	8–0	(Romania) Marcel Turcas	KO	2	1990-03-09	(France) Annecy	
7	Win	7–0	(Martinique) Joel Brival	KO	1	1990-02-23	(France) Nancy	
6	Win	6–0	(Spain) Rafael Fuentes	KO	2	1990-01-26	(France) Nogent-sur-Marne	
5	Win	5–0	(Belgium) Bechir Chaarane	DQ	5	1989-12-16	(France) Salle Louis Simon, Gaillard	
4	Win	4–0	(Belgium) Jimmy Gourad	KO	4	1989-12-02	(France) Nantes	
3	Win	3–0	(Netherlands) Kid Taylor	KO	5	1989-10-13	(France) Sète	
2	Win	2–0	(France) Eric Dindaine	TKO	1	1989-06-02	(France) Marsac	
1	Win	1–0	(France) Djamel Zeghadi	KO	1	1989-04-17	(France) Saint-Quentin	

== See also ==
- List of world light-middleweight boxing champions

Sporting positions
Regional boxing titles
Preceded by Jean Claude Fontana	EBU Super-welterweight champion November 29, 1992 – October 5, 1993	Succeeded by Bernard Razzano
Preceded by Javier Castillejo	EBU Super-welterweight champion January 3, 1995 – 1996; Vacated	Vacant Title next held by Faouzi Hattab
World boxing titles
Preceded by Julio César Vásquez	WBA Super welterweight champion August 21, 1996 – March 6, 1999	Succeeded by David Reid
