= Robert Wangila =

Kenyan boxer (1966–1994)

Personal information
- Born: 3 September 1966
- Died: 24 July 1994 (aged 27)
Medal record
Men's Boxing
Representing Kenya
Olympic Games
| Gold medal – first place | 1988 Seoul | Welterweight |
All-Africa Games
| Gold medal – first place | 1987 Nairobi | Featherweight |

Robert Napunyi Wangila (3 September 1966 — 24 July 1994) was a Kenyan boxer who won a welterweight gold medal at the 1988 Summer Olympic Games. He is the only Kenyan Olympic gold medalist outside of athletics and the only boxer from Sub-Saharan Africa outside of South Africa to have won Olympic gold.

== Olympic results ==
- 1st round bye
- Defeated Đorđe Petronijević (Yugoslavia) RSC 2
- Defeated Khaidan Gantulga (Mongolia) TKO 2
- Defeated Khristo Furnigov (Bulgaria) 5-0
- Defeated Jan Dydak (Poland) walk-over
- Defeated Laurent Boudouani (France) KO 2

== Pro career ==
Wangila turned to professional boxing in 1989 and compiled a career record of 22-5-0.

== Death ==
Wangila died from injuries received in a 1994 fight with David Gonzales in Las Vegas. Wangila had been beaten to such a bad condition that the referee Joe Cortez stopped the match in favour of Gonzales, despite Wangila's fierce protests. After the match, Wangila lapsed into a coma in his dressing room. He was pronounced dead thirty-six hours later. Wangila had converted from Christianity to Islam while in the United States, and his will requested that he be buried according to the wishes of his Muslim wife. Napunyi Wangila, married Queen Noble, May 16, 1992 until his death. The will was challenged by Wangila's family in Kenya, but a judge ruled in favor of a Muslim burial.
