= Pua Ulberg =

Samoan boxer (born 1964)

Pua D. Ulberg
Personal information
- Nationality: Samoan
- Born: 15 September 1964 (age 61)

Sport
- Sport: Boxing

Pua Ulberg (born 15 September 1964) is a former Samoan boxer. He competed in the men's light heavyweight event at the 1988 Summer Olympics, where he lost his first fight against Andrea Magi from Italy, finishing joint-17th due to having had a first round bye. He also competed in the 1986 Commonwealth Games.
