= Chylak =

Chylak (Polish) or Khilyak (Belarusian or Ukrainian) is a surname. Notable people with the surname include:

- Dorota Chylak (born 1966), Polish swimmer
- Nestor Chylak (1922–1982), American baseball umpire
