= Shooting at the 1988 Summer Olympics – Men's 50 metre running target =

Sports shooting at the Olympics

Men's 50 metre running target at the Games of the XXIV Olympiad
- Date: 23 September 1988
- Competitors: 23 from 16 nations
- Winning score: 689 (OR)

Medalists
| 1st place, gold medalist(s) | | Tor Heiestad | Norway |
| 2nd place, silver medalist(s) | | Huang Shiping | China |
| 3rd place, bronze medalist(s) | | Gennadi Avramenko | Soviet Union |

Men's 50 metre running target made its final Olympic appearance at the 1988 Summer Olympics (after which it was replaced by 10 metre running target). It was also the only time the 30 slow runs and 30 fast runs were followed by a ten-shot final (fast runs) for the top four contestants. Gennadi Avramenko and Tor Heiestad established a new Olympic record of 591 points, and Heiestad won the final, where Avramenko was also surpassed by Huang Shiping.

== Qualification round ==
| Rank | Athlete | Country | Slow | Fast | Total | Notes |
|---|---|---|---|---|---|---|
| 1 | Gennadi Avramenko | Soviet Union | 294 | 297 | 591 | Q OR |
| 1 | Tor Heiestad | Norway | 299 | 292 | 591 | Q OR |
| 3 | Huang Shiping | China | 296 | 293 | 589 | Q |
| 4 | Ján Kermiet | Czechoslovakia | 295 | 293 | 588 | Q |
| 5 | Andras Doleschall | Hungary | 296 | 292 | 588 | |
| 6 | Attila Solti | Hungary | 296 | 292 | 588 | |
| 7 | Thomas Pfeffer | East Germany | 298 | 289 | 587 | |
| 8 | Christian Stützinger | West Germany | 297 | 289 | 586 | |
| 9 | Jan Pettersson | Sweden | 292 | 294 | 586 | |
| 10 | Ji Gang | China | 295 | 291 | 586 | |
| 11 | Jean-Luc Tricoire | France | 295 | 291 | 586 | |
| 12 | Jerzy Greszkiewicz | Poland | 297 | 287 | 584 | |
| 12 | Luboš Račanský | Czechoslovakia | 295 | 289 | 584 | |
| 14 | Oleg Moldovan | Soviet Union | 294 | 289 | 583 | |
| 15 | Mike Herrmann | East Germany | 295 | 287 | 582 | |
| 15 | Wojciech Karkusiewicz | Poland | 294 | 288 | 582 | |
| 17 | Todd Bensley | United States | 295 | 286 | 581 | |
| 18 | Scott Swinney | United States | 289 | 291 | 580 | |
| 19 | Valerio Donnianni | Italy | 291 | 286 | 577 | |
| 19 | Hong Seung-pyo | South Korea | 291 | 286 | 577 | |
| 21 | David Lee | Canada | 292 | 281 | 573 | |
| 22 | Bryan Wilson | Australia | 291 | 282 | 573 | |
| 23 | Carlos Silva Monterrosa | Guatemala | 284 | 285 | 569 | |

OR Olympic record – Q Qualified for final

== Final ==
| Rank | Athlete | Qual | 1 | 2 | 3 | 4 | 5 | 6 | 7 | 8 | 9 | 10 | Final | Total | Notes |
|---|---|---|---|---|---|---|---|---|---|---|---|---|---|---|---|
| 1st place, gold medalist(s) | Tor Heiestad (NOR) | 591 | 10 | 10 | 10 | 10 | 10 | 10 | 10 | 10 | 8 | 10 | 98 | 689 | OR |
| 2nd place, silver medalist(s) | Huang Shiping (CHN) | 589 | 10 | 10 | 9 | 10 | 10 | 10 | 10 | 9 | 10 | 10 | 98 | 687 | |
| 3rd place, bronze medalist(s) | Gennadi Avramenko (URS) | 591 | 10 | 7 | 10 | 10 | 9 | 9 | 10 | 10 | 10 | 10 | 95 | 686 | |
| 4 | Ján Kermiet (TCH) | 588 | 9 | 10 | 7 | 10 | 9 | 10 | 9 | 10 | 7 | 10 | 91 | 679 | |

OR Olympic record

== Sources ==
- XXIVth Olympiad Seoul 1988 Official Report – Volume 2 Part 2 (PDF).
