= Henryk Petrich =

Polish boxer (born 1959)

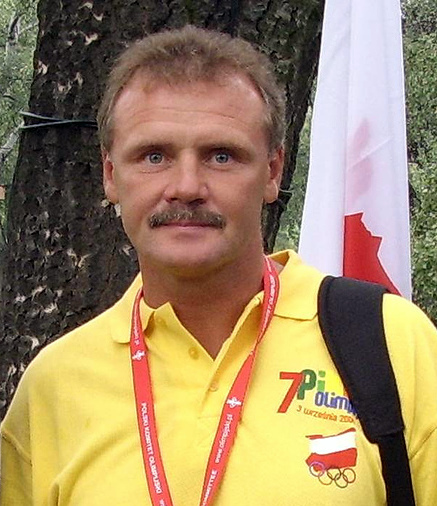

Medal record

Men's Boxing

Representing Poland

Olympic Games
Bronze medal – third place	1988 Seoul	Light Heavyweight

Friendship Games
Silver medal – second place	1984 Havana	Middleweight

World championships
Bronze medal – third place	1986 Reno	Middleweight kg

Henryk Petrich (born 10 January 1959 in Łódź, Łódź Voivodeship) is a former Polish amateur boxer, who won the Light Heavyweight bronze medal at the 1988 Seoul Olympic games. Petrich also won bronze medal at the 1986 World Championships in Reno and silver medal at the 1987 European Championships in Turin. He's eight-time Polish champion (1983-1986 in the middleweight division and 1987-1988, 1990-1991 in the light heavyweight division).

== 1988 Olympic Results ==
- Defeated Park Byun-Jin (South Korea) RSC 2
- Defeated Niels Madsen (Denmark) 5-0
- Defeated Ahmed El-Nagar (Egypt) 5-0
- Lost to Andrew Maynard (United States) TKO 3
