= Gendlin =

Gendlin is a Jewish surname. Notable people with the surname include:

- Eugene Gendlin (1926–2017), American philosopher, born Gendelin
- Vladimir Gendlin (1936–2021), Russian boxing commentator and expert
