= Fidèle Mohinga =

Central African boxer (born 1964)

Personal information
- Nationality: Central African Republic
- Born: 15 May 1964 (age 60)

Sport
- Sport: Boxing

Fidèle Mohinga (born 15 May 1964) is a Central African Republic boxer. He competed in the men's welterweight event at the 1988 Summer Olympics.
