= Tor Heiestad =

Norwegian sport shooter (born 1962)

Olympic medal record

Men's shooting

Representing Norway
Gold medal – first place	1988 Seoul	50 m running target

Tor Heiestad (born 13 January 1962) is a Norwegian shooter.

He was born in Oslo, but represented the club Bærum JK. He became Olympic champion in the 50 metre running target in Seoul 1988. The event was then discontinued, so in Barcelona 1992 he placed tenth in the 10 metre running target event. He won the European Championship in the same event in 1990, in addition to four Nordic titles. On national level he has one King's Cup and many Norwegian championships.
