= Pedro Frias =

Dominican boxer (1964–2013)

Personal information
- Full name: Pedro Frias Reynoso
- Nationality: Dominican
- Born: 23 December 1964
- Died: 3 August 2013 (aged 48) Villa Altagracia, Dominican Republic

Sport
- Sport: Boxing
Medal record
Men's amateur boxing
Representing Dominican Republic
Pan American Games
Bronze medal – third place	1987 Indianapolis	Welterweight

Pedro Frias Reynoso (23 December 1964 – 3 August 2013) was a Dominican Republic boxer. He competed in the men's welterweight event at the 1988 Summer Olympics. Frias is legally blind in one eye.

Frias died on August 3, 2013, after suffering a heart attack while exercising at a softball stadium near his home. He had a prior heart condition and got a pacemaker implanted.
