= Mike Herrmann =

German sports shooter (born 1966)

Personal information
- Nationality: East German
- Born: 26 July 1966 (age 60) Rudolstadt, East Germany

Sport
- Sport: Sports shooting

Mike Herrmann (born 26 July 1966) is a former East German sports shooter. He competed in the men's 50 metre running target event at the 1988 Summer Olympics.
