= Billy Walsh (boxer) =

Irish boxer

Personal information
- Full name: William Thomas Walsh
- Nationality: Irish
- Born: 3 July 1963 (age 61); Manchester, England

Sport
- Sport: Boxing

William Thomas Walsh (born 3 July 1963) is an Irish former boxer who is currently the Head Coach of USA Boxing. Raised in Wexford, he competed in the men's welterweight event at the 1988 Summer Olympics.

Walsh was appointed head coach of the Irish High Performance Boxing programme in 2003 and was at the helm of Irish boxing at the 2008 Summer Olympics and 2012 Summer Olympics, guiding them to seven medals, bookmarked by Katie Taylor's gold in London. He was headhunted by USA Boxing after the U.S. men went home without a medal for the first time in their history.

In 2016 Walsh was awarded the International Boxing Association 'Coach of the Year'.

He is the uncle of fellow boxer Dean Walsh.
