= Abdoukerim Hamidou =

Togolese boxer (born 1965)

Personal information
- Nationality: Togolese
- Born: 15 April 1965 (age 59)

Sport
- Sport: Boxing

Abdoukerim Hamidou (born 15 April 1965) is a Togolese boxer. He competed in the men's welterweight event at the 1988 Summer Olympics.
