= Asomua Naea =

Samoan boxer (born 1969)

Personal information
- Nationality: Samoan
- Born: 4 April 1969 (age 56)

Sport
- Sport: Boxing

Asomua Naea (born 4 April 1969) is a Samoan former boxer. He competed in the men's welterweight event at the 1988 Summer Olympics.
