= Đorđe Petronijević =

Serbian boxer (1961–2024)

Personal information
- Native name: Ђорђе Петронијевић
- Nationality: Serbian
- Born: 28 June 1961; Smederevska Palanka, PR Serbia, FPR Yugoslavia
- Died: October 2024 (aged 63); Vinci, Serbia

Sport
- Sport: Boxing

Đorđe Petronijević (Ђорђе Петронијевић; also transliterated Djordje; 28 June 1961 – October 2024) was a Serbian boxer. He competed for Yugoslavia in the men's welterweight event at the 1988 Summer Olympics. Petronijević died in Vinci in October 2024, at the age of 63.
