= Lionel Ortíz =

Puerto Rican boxer

Personal information
- Nationality: Puerto Rican
- Born: 23 September 1970 (age 54); Ponce, Puerto Rico

Sport
- Sport: Boxing

Lionel Ortíz (born 23 September 1970) is a Puerto Rican boxer. He competed in the men's welterweight event at the 1988 Summer Olympics.
