= Ahmed El-Masri =

Lebanese boxer

Personal information
- Nationality: Lebanese
- Born: 10 April 1961 (age 64)

Sport
- Sport: Boxing

Ahmed El-Masri (born 10 April 1961) is a Lebanese boxer. He competed in the men's light heavyweight event at the 1988 Summer Olympics. He was a national champion.
