= Javier Martínez (Spanish boxer) =

Spanish boxer

Personal information
- Nationality: Spanish
- Born: 15 April 1968 (age 56)

Sport
- Sport: Boxing

Javier Martínez (born 15 April 1968) is a Spanish boxer. He competed in the men's welterweight event at the 1988 Summer Olympics.
