= Jeffrey Nedd =

Aruban boxer (born 1957)

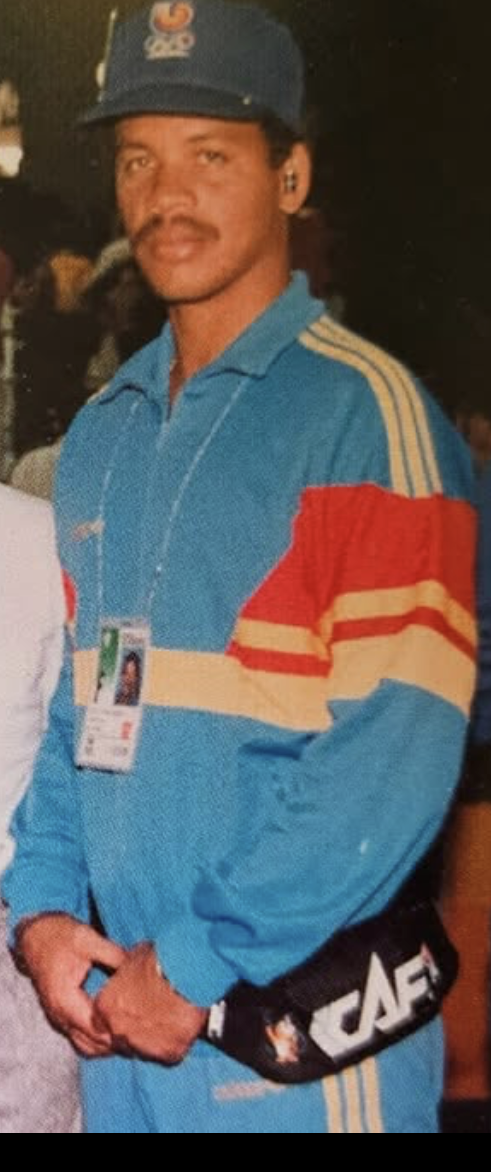
- Jeffrey Nedd c. 1988

Personal information
- Born: 16 January 1957 (age 69) San Nicolaas, Aruba
- Height: 6’0 1/2
- Weight: 87 kg (192 lb)

Sport
- Sport: Boxing
- Event: Light heavyweight

Jeffrey Reginald Nedd (born 16 January 1957 in San Nicholas, Aruba) is a former amateur boxer who competed internationally for Aruba.

== Career ==
He had his first big win, defeating Dominican youth champion, Guillermo Meija on July 28, 1984 in Oranjestad winning on points. In 1988, Nedd was the runner up in the annual Batalla de Carabobo Nedd, losing to Jose de la Rosa. competed at the 1988 Summer Olympics in Seoul, South Korea, he entered the light-heavyweight class but was stopped in the second round of his opening fight by Kenyan Joseph Akhasamba, so didn't advance any further. On May 12, 1989, Nedd fought Harold Arroyo at the 10th anniversary gala of the Aruban Boxing Association, winning the fight on points. Nedd retired in 1993, ending his 13 year career.

== Results ==
Olympic Games

- Round One: Lost to Joseph Akhasamba (Kenya) referee stopped contest head blows, second round

== Life after retirement ==
In 1993, Nedd opened Jefferson Boxing Gym in Cura Cabai, Aruba. Nedd trained his son, mixed martial artist, Evan Nedd. Nedd also trains his grandson, Evander Nedd who is an amateur boxer. 2011 Nedd was the Aruba National Head Coach.In 2024, Nedd was honored as an Olympian for Life.
