= Richard Hamilton (boxer) =

Jamaican boxer (born 1967)

Personal information
- Nationality: Jamaican
- Born: 9 January 1967 (age 59)

Sport
- Sport: Boxing

Richard Hamilton (born 9 January 1967) is a Jamaican boxer. He competed in the men's welterweight event at the 1988 Summer Olympics.
