= Jan Dydak =

Polish boxer (1968–2019)

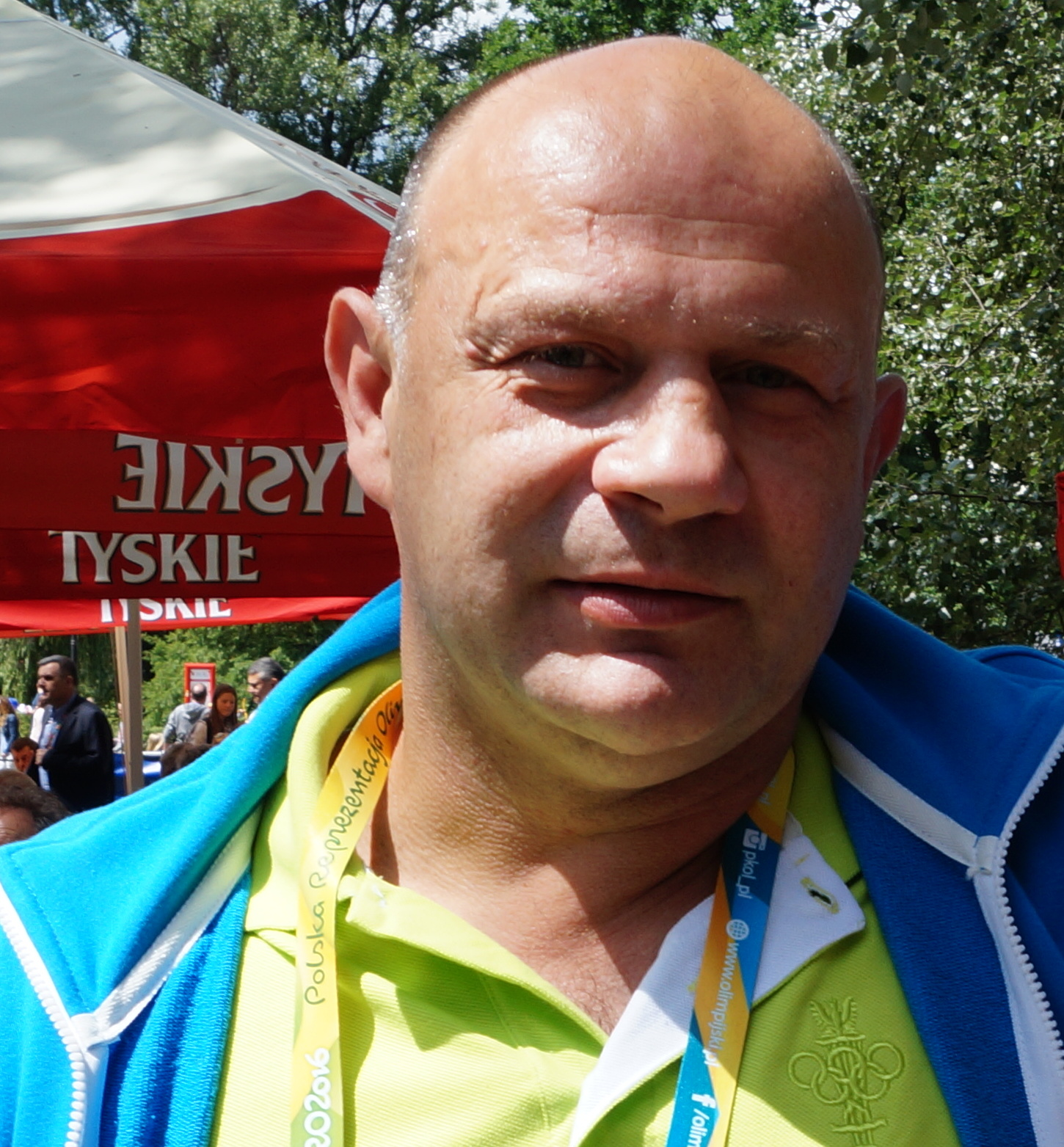

Personal information
- Born: June 14, 1968 Czeladź, Śląskie, Poland
- Died: March 27, 2019 (aged 50) Slupsk
Medal record
Men's boxing
Representing Poland
Olympic Games
Bronze medal – third place	1988 Seoul	Welterweight
European Championships
Bronze medal – third place	1991 Gothenburg	Light Middleweight

Jan Zygmunt Dydak (June 14, 1968 – March 27, 2019) was a Polish amateur boxer, who won the Welterweight Bronze medal at the 1988 Summer Olympics. He was born in Czeladź, Śląskie.

== 1988 Olympic results ==
Below are Dydak's boxing results at the 1988 Summer Olympics held in Seoul:

- Round of 64: bye
- Round of 32: Defeated José García (Venezuela) by decision, 4–1
- Round of 16: Defeated Humberto Aranda (Costa Rica) by decision, 4–1
- Quarterfinal: Defeated Adewale Adgebusi (Nigeria) by decision, 4–1
- Semifinal: Lost to Robert Wangila (Kenya) by walkover (was awarded bronze medal)
