= 1989 European Amateur Boxing Championships =

Boxing competitions

- Host city: Athens
- Country: Greece
- Nations: 26
- Athletes: 160
- Dates: 29 May–3 June

The Men's 1989 European Amateur Boxing Championships were held in Athens, Greece from May 29 to June 3, with the participation of 160 fighters from 26 countries. The 28th edition of the bi-annual competition was organised by the European governing body for amateur boxing, EABA.

== Medal winners ==
EVENT	(gold) GOLD	(silver) SILVER	(bronze) BRONZE
Light Flyweight (– 48 kilograms)	Ivailo Marinov; Bulgaria	Róbert Isaszegi; Hungary	Nshan Munchyan; Soviet Union Jan Quast; East Germany
Flyweight (– 51 kilograms)	Yuri Arbachakov; Soviet Union	János Váradi; Hungary	Krasimir Czolakov; Bulgaria Krzysztof Wróblewski; Poland
Bantamweight (– 54 kilograms)	Serafim Todorov; Bulgaria	Timofey Skryabin; Soviet Union	Dieter Berg; East Germany Robert Ciba; Poland
Featherweight (– 57 kilograms)	Kirkor Kirkorov; Bulgaria	Marco Rudolph; East Germany	Rafał Rudzki; Poland Sandro Casamonica; Italy
Lightweight (– 60 kilograms)	Konstantin Tszyu; Soviet Union	Daniel Dumitrescu; Romania	Giorgio Campanella; Italy David Anderson; Scotland
Light Welterweight (– 63.5 kilograms)	Igor Ruzhnikov; Soviet Union	Dariusz Czernij; Poland	Khristo Furnigov; Bulgaria Andreas Otto; East Germany
Welterweight (– 67 kilograms)	Siegfried Mehnert; East Germany	Borislav Abadzhiev; Bulgaria	(Socialist Federal Republic of Yugoslavia) Mujo Bajrović; Yugoslavia Lorant Szabo; Hungary
Light Middleweight (– 71 kilograms)	Israel Akopkokhyan; Soviet Union	Rudel Obreja; Romania	Enrico Richter; East Germany Rosen Ibichev; Bulgaria
Middleweight (– 75 kilograms)	Henry Maske; East Germany	(Czech Republic) Michal Franek; Czechoslovakia	Daniel Krumov; Bulgaria Andrey Kurnyavka; Soviet Union
Light Heavyweight (– 81 kilograms)	Sven Lange; East Germany	Lajos Eros; Hungary	Kai Helenius; Finland Sergei Kobozev; Soviet Union
Heavyweight (– 91 kilograms)	Arnold Vanderlyde; Netherlands	Axel Schulz; East Germany	Andrzej Gołota; Poland Bert Teuchert; West Germany
Super Heavyweight (+ 91 kilograms)	Ulli Kaden; East Germany	Giorgios Tsahakis; Greece	Svilen Rusinov; Bulgaria Aleksandr Miroshnichenko; Soviet Union

== Medal table ==
Rank	Nation	Gold	Silver	Bronze	Total
1	East Germany (GDR)	4	2	4	10
2	Soviet Union (URS)	4	1	4	9
3	Bulgaria (BUL)	3	1	5	9
4	Netherlands (NED)	1	0	0	1
5	Hungary (HUN)	0	3	1	4
6	Romania (ROU)	0	2	0	2
7	Poland (POL)	0	1	4	5
8	Czechoslovakia (TCH)	0	1	0	1
8	Greece (GRE)	0	1	0	1
10	Italy (ITA)	0	0	2	2
11	Finland (FIN)	0	0	1	1
11	Scotland (SCO)	0	0	1	1
11	West Germany (FRG)	0	0	1	1
11	Yugoslavia (YUG)	0	0	1	1
Totals (14 entries)		12	12	24	48
