= Siegfried Mehnert =

East German boxer

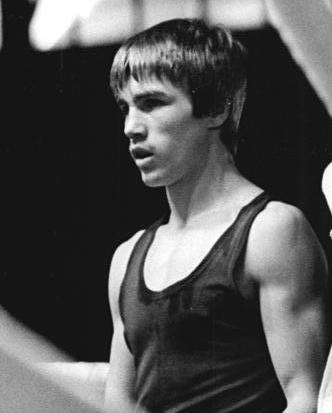
- Siegfried Mehnert in 1982

Personal information
- Full name: Siegfried Mehnert
- Nationality: East Germany
- Born: 3 March 1963 (age 63) Schenkenberg, Bezirk Leipzig, East Germany
- Height: 1.72 m (5 ft 8 in)
- Weight: 68 kg (150 lb)

Sport
- Sport: Boxing
- Weight class: Welterweight
- Club: SV Halle, Halle an der Saale
Medal record
Men's amateur boxing
Representing East Germany
Friendship Games
Bronze medal – third place	1984 Havana	Light welterweight
World Championships
Silver medal – second place	1989 Moscow	Welterweight
European Championships
Bronze medal – third place	1983 Varna	Light Welterweight
Gold medal – first place	1985 Budapest	Welterweight
Silver medal – second place	1987 Turin	Welterweight
Gold medal – first place	1989 Athens	Welterweight

Siegfried Mehnert (born 3 March 1963 in Schenkenberg, Delitzsch, Bezirk Leipzig) is a former amateur boxer from East Germany. He is best known for twice winning the European title (1985 and 1989) in the men's welterweight (– 67 kg) division. He also competed at the 1988 Seoul Olympics.

== 1988 Olympic results ==
Below is the Olympic record of Siegfried Mehnert, an East German welterweight boxer who competed at the 1988 Olympics in Seoul.

- Round of 64: defeated Jose Ortiz (Puerto Rico) by decision, 5–0
- Round of 32: defeated Abdellas Taouane (Morocco) by decision, 5–0
- Round of 16: lost to Song Kyung-Sup (South Korea) by decision, 2–3
