= Wanderley Oliveira =

Brazilian boxer (born 1965)

Personal information
- Born: 29 March 1965 (age 61) São Paulo, Brazil

Sport
- Sport: Boxing
Medal record
Men's amateur boxing
Representing Brazil
Pan American Games
Bronze medal – third place	1987 Indianapolis	Light welterweight

Wanderley Oliveira (born 29 March 1965) is a Brazilian boxer. He competed in the men's welterweight event at the 1988 Summer Olympics.
