= Vladimir Yereshchenko =

Russian boxer (1962–2024)

Personal information
- Full name: Vladimir Alexandrovich Yereshchenko
- Nationality: Russian
- Born: 7 September 1962; Voronezh, Russian SFSR, USSR
- Died: 20 May 2024 (aged 61)

Sport
- Sport: Boxing

Vladimir Alexandrovich Yereshchenko (Russian: Владимир Александрович Ерещенко; 7 September 1962 – 20 May 2024) was a Soviet, and later Russian, boxer. He competed in the men's welterweight event at the 1988 Summer Olympics. Yereshchenko died on 20 May 2024, at the age of 61.
