= Sergei Kobozev =

Russian boxer

Sergey Viktorovich Kobozev
Personal information
- Nickname: Russian Bear
- Nationality: Russian
- Born: Sergey Viktorovich Kobozev; July 20, 1964 Kostroma, Russian SFSR, Soviet Union
- Died: November 8, 1995 (aged 31) Livingston, New Jersey

Boxing career
- Stance: Orthodox

Boxing record
- Total fights: 23
- Wins: 21
- Win by KO: 17
- Losses: 1
- Draws: 1
Medal record
Men's amateur boxing
Representing Soviet Union
European Championships
Bronze medal – third place	1989 Athens	Light heavyweight
Army Championships of the Socialist Countries
Gold medal – first place	1984 Yaroslavl	Heavyweight
Silver medal – second place	1987 Rostov	Light heavyweight
Silver medal – second place	1989 Sliven	Light heavyweight

Sergey Kobozev (Kostroma, Russian SFSR, Soviet Union; July 20, 1964 – November 8, 1995) was a Russian boxer, who challenged for the WBC cruiserweight title in 1995. He is also known for being the first boxer to defeat John Ruiz. He proved to be a tough slugger, but his career ended early after he was killed by the Russian mafia.

Kobozev was the Cruiserweight Champion of the Soviet Union. After moving to the United States, he continued his undefeated career and became the International Boxing Federation Cruiserweight Champion in July 1994. He was scheduled to fight Orlin Norris on March 12, 1995, for the WBA World Cruiserweight title, but the fight didn't happen. In a bout for the WBC Cruiserweight title on October 24, 1995, he lost his title shot via a split decision. Shortly thereafter he was given another title shot opportunity at a rematch scheduled for December 13 for which he was training, he also had three big matches coming up, but on November 8, 1995, Kobozev was reported missing by his girlfriend Lina Cherskikh. Later surfaced that Kobozev was murdered by Russian mafia after a bar scuffle at Brooklyn's Paradise Club the weekend of November 3, 1995.

== Early life ==
Kobozev had been a captain in the Soviet Army and held a degree in chemistry from the Institute of Moscow, before he made his name as a cruiserweight on the Soviet national boxing team.

== Amateur career ==
As an amateur, Kobozev held wins over Ali Al-Baluchi and Garry Delaney.

=== Highlights ===
(gold) Army Championships of the Friendly Armies of the Socialist Countries (heavyweight), Yaroslavl, RSFSR, June 1984:

- (no data available)

(gold) Tammer Tournament (light heavyweight), Tampere, Finland, October 1984:

- Finals: Defeated Milan Picka (Czechoslovakia) by decision

(gold) President's Cup (heavyweight), Jakarta, Indonesia, February 1985:

- Finals: Defeated Ali Al-Baluchi (Kuwait) RSC 2

(silver) Summer Spartakiad of Peoples of the USSR, boxing (light heavyweight), Moscow, RSFSR, September 1986:

- 1/2: Defeated Petro Mischenko (Ukrainian SSR)
- Finals: Lost to Yuriy Vaulin (Latvian SSR)

(bronze) Tammer Tournament (light heavyweight), Tampere, Finland, October 1986:

- 1/2: Lost to Wolf Preiss (East Germany)

(silver) Army Championships of the Friendly Armies of the Socialist Countries (light heavyweight), Rostov, RSFSR, June 1987:

- Finals: Lost to Khakim Matchanov (Uzbek SSR) by split decision, 2–3

(bronze) Giraldo Córdova Cardín Tournament (light heavyweight), Las Tunas, Cuba, June–July 1988:

- 1/8: Defeated Benjamin Luperon (Cuba) by unanimous decision, 5–0
- 1/4: Defeated Julio Quintana (Cuba) by majority decision, 4–1
- 1/2: Lost to Pablo Romero (Cuba) by majority decision, 1–4

Strandzha Memorial (light heavyweight), Sofia, Bulgaria, February 1988:

- 1/4: Lost to Henryk Petrich (Poland) by split decision, 2–3

USA–Soviet Union Middle & Heavy Duals (light heavyweight), Stateline, Nevada, May 1988:

- Defeated Joseph Pemberton (United States) RET 2

(bronze) Ústí Grand Prix (light heavyweight), Ústí nad Labem, Czechoslovakia, March 1989:

- 1/4: Defeated Yaha Kosar (Syria) by decision
- 1/2: Lost to ?

(bronze) European Championships (light heavyweight), Athens, Greece, May–June 1989:

- 1/4: Defeated Alen Kozhukharov (Bulgaria) by unanimous decision, 5–0
- 1/2: Lost to Sven Lange (East Germany) by unanimous decision, 0–5

(silver) Army Championships of the Friendly Armies of the Socialist Countries (light heavyweight), Sliven, Bulgaria, June 1989:

- 1/2: Defeated Henryk Petrich (Poland) by walkover
- Finals: Lost to Pablo Romero (Cuba) by split decision, 2–3

(gold) Tammer Tournament (light heavyweight), Tampere, Finland, October 1989:

- Finals: Defeated Garry Delaney (England) by decision

USA–Soviet Middle & Heavy Duals (light heavyweight), Atlanta, Georgia, November 1989:

- Defeated Eugene Gill (United States) RSC

== Professional career ==
In 1990 Kobozev went to the United States, he lived in a fourth-floor apartment on 16th Street in a working-class section of Sheepshead Bay with his live-in companion Yelena Cherskikh, and her 7-year-old son, Vitaly. He was managed by Thomas Gallagher and trained by Peter Kahn.

He received a shot at the WBC title vacated by recently retired Anaclet Wamba, for which Kobozev fought Marcelo Fabian Dominguez in Paris and lost via a controversial decision.

Early in November 1995 Kobozev started training for a December 13 rematch versus Marcelo Fabian Dominguez to whom he lost a split decision, but soon he disappeared.

Kobozev's ring record was 22 wins and 1 loss in 23 professional outings.

== Disappearance ==
Kobozev disappeared in November 1995, just 2 weeks after losing a close split decision for the WBC Cruiserweight title, his very first career loss.

== Murder ==
The mystery surrounding his death was solved when his bones were found by the FBI in March 1999 in the backyard of the Russian Mafia's #2: Alexander Spitchenko in Livingston, New Jersey, United States. Kobozev's body had been buried in a shallow grave.

Kobozev was allegedly murdered by two reputed Russian mobsters, Alexander Nosov and Vasiliy Ermichine. Natan Gozman, a third defendant charged in the murder, remained a fugitive until February 2005, when he was arrested in Poland and extradited to New York, where he awaits trial.

Prosecutors said that the Russian mob allegedly turned against Kobozev because he worked as a part-time security guard at a Brooklyn restaurant from which Nosov was ejected after a fight with a musician. Several days after the fight, the defendants and a third member of the gang unexpectedly encountered Kobozev at a car repair shop, where they confronted him about the fight before Nosov shot him, authorities said. Still alive, Kobozev was put in a jeep and driven to the Livingston, N.J., home of a high-ranking member of the crime group, where his neck was broken by Ermichine after Kobozev asked to be taken to a hospital, prosecutors said.

== Professional boxing record ==
21 Wins (17 knockouts, 4 decisions), 1 Loss (1 decision), 1 Draw
Result	Record	Opponent	Type	Round	Date	Location	Notes
Loss	18-1-1	(Argentina) Marcelo Fabian Dominguez	SD	12	October 24, 1995	(France) Palais Marcel Cerdan, Levallois-Perret, Hauts-de-Seine	WBC World Cruiserweight Title. 113-116, 113-115, 116-115.
Win	10-8	(United States) Art Bayliss	TKO	5	June 24, 1995	(United States) Atlantic City Convention Center, Atlantic City, New Jersey	
Win	20-9-3	(United States) Dale Jackson	TKO	2	March 29, 1995	(United States) Lexington Avenue Armory, New York City	
Win	7-7-1	(United States) Doug "Dig-em-Up" Davis	TKO	8	December 17, 1994	(United States) Trump Taj Majal, Atlantic City, New Jersey	Referee stopped the bout at 1:35 of the eighth round.
Win	24-6	(United States) "Boxing" Andrew Maynard	TKO	10	August 27, 1994	(United States) Miami Beach Convention Center, Miami Beach, Florida	IBF USBA Cruiserweight Title. Referee stopped the bout at 1:37 of the tenth round.
Win	25-2-1	(United States) Robert Daniels	RTD	8	June 30, 1994	(United States) Trump Castle, Atlantic City, New Jersey	IBF USBA Cruiserweight Title. Daniels did not come out for the eighth round.
Win	11-16-2	(United States) Eddie Curry	KO	1	April 13, 1994	(United States) Raleigh, North Carolina	
Win	14-0	(United States) John Ruiz	SD	10	August 12, 1993	(United States) Casino Magic, Bay Saint Louis, Mississippi	95-97, 96-94, 98-94.
Win	14-25-2	(United States) Danny Wofford	UD	8	May 21, 1993	(United States) Marriott Hotel, Uniondale, New York	
Win	10-6-2	(United States) Ken Jackson	TKO	2	March 21, 1993	(United States) Trump Taj Majal, Atlantic City, New Jersey	
Win	2-1-1	(United States) Kevin "The Monster" Parker	UD	6	January 24, 1993	(United States) Trump Taj Majal, Atlantic City, New Jersey	59-54, 59-55, 59-54.
Win	5-3	(United States) Kelvin Beatty	TKO	3	December 10, 1992	(United States) Trump Taj Majal, Atlantic City, New Jersey	
Win	4-4-1	(United States) Doug "Dig-em-Up" Davis	TKO	4	October 23, 1992	(United States) Fernwood Resort, Bushkill, Pennsylvania	
Win	8-10-3	(United States) Carl Lee Wilson	TKO	2	September 25, 1992	(United States) Friar Tuck Inn, Catskill, New York	
Win	4-2	(United States) Dwayne Hall	TKO	2	August 14, 1992	(United States) Trump Plaza Hotel and Casino, Atlantic City, New Jersey	
Win	6-5	(United States) Howard "Butch" Kelly	RTD	3	July 1, 1992	(United States) Metropole Night Club, Brooklyn, New York	Kelly did not come out for the fourth round.
Win	1-3-1	(United States) Frank Dupree	UD	6	June 20, 1991	(United States) Aspen Hotel, Parsippany, New Jersey	
Win	--	(Russian Soviet Federative Socialist Republic) Aleksandr Mitrofanov	KO	7	February 17, 1991	(Soviet Union) Grozny, Chechen-Ingush ASSR	USSR Cruiserweight Title.
Win	--	(Russian Soviet Federative Socialist Republic) Rafael Akopov	KO	3	December 1, 1990	(Soviet Union) Barnaul, RSFSR	
Win	0-1-1	Nurmagomed Shanavazov	KO	2	November 3, 1990	(Soviet Union) Sport Palace Gornyak, Rudniy, Kazakh SSR	
Draw	0-1	Nurmagomed Shanavazov	PTS	8	September 30, 1990	(Soviet Union) Rostov-na-Donu, RSFSR	
Win	--	(Russian Soviet Federative Socialist Republic) Mikhail Poluyanov	KO	2	June 2, 1990	(Soviet Union) Riga, Latvian SSR	
Win	--	(Russian Soviet Federative Socialist Republic) Andrey Korotaev	KO	6	March 31, 1990	(Soviet Union)	
