= Kenneth Gould =

American boxer

Kenny Gould
Personal information
- Full name: Kenneth Gould
- Nickname: "Kenny"
- Born: May 11, 1967 (age 59) Rockford, Illinois, U.S.
- Height: 1.67 m (5 ft 6 in)
- Weight: 67 kg (148 lb)

Sport
- Sport: Boxing
- Weight class: Welterweight
Medal record
Olympic Games
Bronze medal – third place	1988 Seoul	Welterweight
World Amateur Championships
Gold medal – first place	1986 Reno	Welterweight
Pan American Games
Silver medal – second place	1987 Indianapolis	Welterweight

Kenneth "Kenny" Gould (born May 11, 1967) is an American retired boxer, who won the welterweight bronze medal at the 1988 Summer Olympics. He won the world title at the 1986 World Amateur Boxing Championships in Reno, followed by a silver medal at the 1987 Pan American Games.

== 1988 Olympic Games ==
- Defeated Joseph Marwa (Tanzania) 4–1
- Defeated Alfred Ankamah (Ghana) 5–0
- Defeated Maselino Masoe (American Samoa) 5–0
- Defeated Joni Nyman (Finland) 5–0
- Lost to Laurent Boudouani (France) 1–4

== Professional career ==
Gould began his professional career that same year and retired in 1993 with a career record of 26–2 (15KO). He fought limited opposition throughout his career, and was unable to compete at the higher levels of the pro ranks. His most notable foe was undefeated contender Roger Turner, who beat Gould by decision, and later went on to be KO'd by Félix Trinidad in a world title fight. Gould went on to win the fringe IBO title, but was forced to retire due to a shoulder injury.
