= René Suetovius =

German boxer

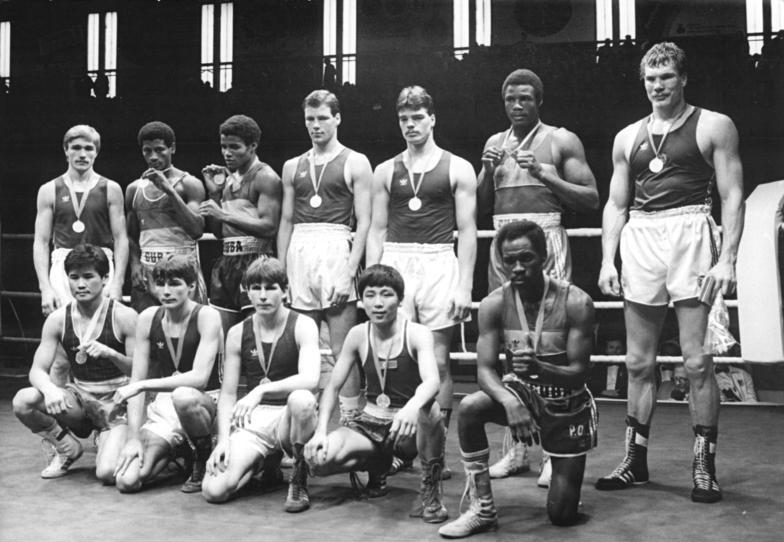
- René Suetovius (center,) Henry Maske (left,) and Félix Savón (right,) at the awards ceremony of the 1986 Chemistry Cup

Personal information
- Nationality: East German
- Born: 3 June 1964 (age 61); Zittau, East Germany

Sport
- Sport: Boxing

René Suetovius (born 3 June 1964) is a German former boxer. He competed in the men's light heavyweight event at the 1988 Summer Olympics representing East Germany.
