= Christian Stützinger =

German sports shooter

Personal information
- Nationality: German
- Born: 6 July 1969 (age 55); Kronach, Germany

Sport
- Sport: Sports shooting

Christian Stützinger (born 6 July 1969) is a German sports shooter. He competed in the men's 50 metre running target event at the 1988 Summer Olympics.
