= Ján Kermiet =

Slovak sport shooter

Ján Kermiet (born 16 March 1963 in Liptovský Mikuláš) is a Slovak sport shooter. He competed at the 1988 Summer Olympics in the men's 50 metre running target event, in which he placed fourth.
