= Huang Shiping =

Chinese sport shooter (born 1963)

Olympic medal record

Men's Shooting

Representing China
Silver medal – second place	1988 Seoul	50 m Running Target
Bronze medal – third place	1984 Los Angeles	50 m Running Target

Huang Shiping (Chinese: 黄世平; born 24 February 1963) is a male Chinese sports shooter. He won a bronze medal at 1984 Olympic Games in men's 50m running target. Four years later, Huang won a silver medal at 1988 Seoul Olympics in the same event.
