= Daryl Joseph =

Antigua and Barbuda boxer

Personal information
- Nationality: Antigua and Barbuda
- Born: 16 May 1966 (age 60)

Sport
- Sport: Boxing

Daryl Joseph (born 16 May 1966) is an Antigua and Barbuda boxer. He competed in the men's welterweight event at the 1988 Summer Olympics.
