= Jan Pettersson =

Swedish sports shooter

Personal information
- Nationality: Swedish
- Born: 31 January 1961 (age 64); Dalarna, Sweden

Sport
- Sport: Sports shooting

Jan Pettersson (born 31 January 1961) is a Swedish sports shooter. He competed in the men's 50 metre running target event at the 1988 Summer Olympics.
