= Gregory Griffith =

Barbadian boxer

Personal information
- Nationality: Barbadian

Sport
- Sport: Boxing

Gregory Griffith is a Barbadian boxer. He competed in the men's welterweight event at the 1988 Summer Olympics.
