= Vladimir Gendlin =

Russian television journalist and sports commentator (1936–2021)

- Born: Vladimir Ilyich Gendlin; 26 May 1936; Moscow, Russian SFSR, Soviet Union
- Died: 5 April 2021 (aged 84); Moscow, Russia
- Occupations: Sport commentator, boxing expert, television journalist
- Notable credit(s): 2-time TEFI winner, WBU award winner

Vladimir Ilyich Gendlin (Russian: Владимир Ильич Гендлин; 26 May 1936 – 5 April 2021) was a Russian commentator and boxing expert, a two-time TEFI award winner. He was the founder of professional boxing telecasts on Russian television. Gendlin's program Bolshoi Ring was considered the best program about boxing in the world by the World Boxing Union in 1995.

He enjoyed prestige in leading magazines, the boxing community in Russia, and countries of the Commonwealth of Independent States.

...it's Vladimir Gendlin who'll commentate the Klitschko vs Chagaev bout: At present he is the best specialist and I don't see any competition for him. He is a commentator and an expert at the same time.

— Nikolay Malyshev, director of Channel One (Russia) sports programs

== Biography ==
Gendlin was born in Moscow. He studied maths at Saratov University but left after the fourth year. He was a master of the sport of boxing, with 51 amateur fights, resulting in 50 victories and one loss. After retirement he worked as a children's trainer at the Olympic base in Kislovodsk. Gendlin was the president of the club Red Stars. After that he became the general manager of the Union of boxers of Russia. Then he worked as a journalist in magazines, and on television in Volgograd and Pyatigorsk. In the early 1990s Gendlin founded the TV programme Bolshoi Ring which was awarded the title of best boxing programme by WBU in 1995. Gendlin was the main commentator for NTV, NTV Plus and Channel One (Russia). He created documentaries about Sergei Kobozev, Sergey Artemiev, Kostya Tszyu, Oleg Maskaev and others. Gendlin was not a fan of women's boxing.

== Death ==
Gendlin died in Moscow on 5 April 2021. He had been experiencing serious health problems, suffering a massive heart attack in March. He subsequently contracted COVID-19, developing complications in the form of pneumonia.

== Quotes ==
A commentator is not an aqyn who's like I-sing-what-I-see. I don't like bla-bla-bla on the air. The commentator's most important job is not to spoil it for the audience. If you feel that something should be explained, just explain it and shut up. The show speaks for itself.

— Vladimir Gendlin
