= Darren Obah =

Australian boxer

Personal information
- Born: 16 December 1963 (age 62) Nambour, Queensland, Australia

Sport
- Sport: Boxing

Darren Obah (born 16 December 1963) is an Australian boxer. He competed in the men's welterweight event at the 1988 Summer Olympics.
