= Eugeniusz Koczorski =

Polish equestrian (born 1956)

Personal information
- Nationality: Polish
- Born: 26 December 1956 (age 68); Polkowice, Poland

Sport
- Sport: Equestrian

Eugeniusz Koczorski (born 26 December 1956) is a Polish equestrian. He competed in two events at the 1988 Summer Olympics.
