= Alfred Ankamah =

Ghanaian boxer

Alfred Addo Ankamah (born January 31, 1967, in Accra) is a Ghanaian professional boxer in the Light Middleweight division.

== Amateur career ==
Ankamah fought for his country of Ghana at Welterweight during the 1988 Seoul Olympic Games. He had been appointed captain of the 4 man team, 2 of them by the names of Ike Quartey and Alfred Kotey. Ankamah had never seen a boxing glove until the age of 20, when his brother brought him into the city to see an exhibition Azumah Nelson was doing. Alfred asked his brother, " people pay to see you tie something on your hands and hit someone else? Oh, this is simple, take me to the place I learn this." Then at 21, he was chosen the Olympic team captain over Ike, who had been groomed for boxing since he was 8 years old. Ankamah, was chosen because of his dedication, as well as being very dependable and responsible, His "work ethic" is what also prompted him being the picked as the team captain. He would go on to knockout Malawi's Boston Simbeye. Unfortunately, since Ankamah by nature is a slugger, not a boxer, he met Kenneth Gould in his second pick, and lost a decision. Kenny Gould brought the bronze medal home to the U.S. that year.

== Pro career ==
In October 1996, Ankamah was knocked out by at that time an unknown eighteen-year-old, Antonio Margarito, Margarito would go on to win three World Championships. Two years later he lost a ten-round decision to Oba Carr.

=== WBC International Light Middleweight Championship ===
On May 1, 2004, Alfred lost by TKO to WBC International Light Middleweight Champion, Mexican Marco Antonio Rubio in the Auditorio Municipal of Torreon, Coahuila, Mexico.
