= Lajos Erős =

Hungarian boxer (born 1964)

Personal information
- Nationality: Hungarian
- Born: 28 May 1964 (age 62) Bonyhád, Hungary

Sport
- Sport: Boxing
Medal record
Men's Boxing
Representing Hungary
European Amateur Championships
Silver medal – second place	1989 Athens	Light Heavyweight

Lajos Erős (born 28 May 1964) is a Hungarian boxer. He competed in the men's light heavyweight event at the 1988 Summer Olympics.
