= Khaidavyn Gantulga =

Mongolian boxer

Personal information
- Nationality: Mongolian
- Born: 9 March 1965 (age 60)

Sport
- Sport: Boxing

Khaidavyn Gantulga (born 9 March 1965) is a Mongolian boxer. He competed in the men's welterweight event at the 1988 Summer Olympics.
