= Terry Dixon (artist) =

American painter

Terry Dixon (April 6, 1969, in Washington, D.C. – March 21, 2019) was an American visual artist. He was awarded a Bachelor of Fine Arts degree from Atlanta College of Art in 1992 and a Master of Fine Arts degree from the School of the Art Institute of Chicago in 1995. His art techniques include painting, photography, computer art, video, and electronic music. Dixon’s imagery is fueled by his love for jazz and electronic music. It explores kinetic connections with his abstract style and reflects a heavy influence of African art and abstract expressionism.

Dixon began exhibiting in 1991 while living in Atlanta, Georgia, and landed on the art scene in Chicago at BAREWALLS 2000, a live art exhibition coordinated by the School of the Art Institute of Chicago. His works have been acquired by many private and public collections, such as the Sandor Collection in Chicago, The School of The Art Institute of Chicago, and the David C. Driskell Center at the University of Maryland at College Park.
