= Krzysztof Rafalak =

Polish equestrian

Personal information
- Nationality: Polish
- Born: 13 September 1956 (age 69) Sopot, Poland

Sport
- Sport: Equestrian
Medal record
Equestrian
Representing Poland
European Championships
Bronze medal – third place	1981 Horsens	Team eventing

Krzysztof Rafalak (born 13 September 1956) is a Polish equestrian. He competed in two events at the 1988 Summer Olympics.
