= Wojciech Karkusiewicz =

Polish sports shooter

Personal information
- Nationality: Polish
- Born: 19 July 1963 (age 61); Starachowice, Poland

Sport
- Sport: Sports shooting

Wojciech Karkusiewicz (born 19 July 1963) is a Polish sports shooter. He competed in the men's 50 metre running target event at the 1988 Summer Olympics.
