= Ivanec (disambiguation) =

Ivanec is a town in Varaždin County, Croatia.

Ivanec may also refer to:

- Ivanec Bistranski, a village near Zaprešić, Zagreb County, Croatia
- Ivanec Križevački, a village near Križevci, Koprivnica-Križevci County, Croatia
- Koprivnički Ivanec, a village and a municipality in Koprivnica-Križevci County, Croatia
