= Sione Vaveni Taliaʻuli =

Tongan boxer

Sione Vaveni Taliaʻuli is a Tongan boxer. He competed in the 1988 Summer Olympics. Sione Talia'uli won Gold in 1987 for the South Pacific Games (SPG) in the Middleweight division, Gold in the 1988 Oceania Heavyweight division and Gold in the 1990 Oceania Light Heavyweight division. He also competed at the 1990 Commonwealth Games. Talia'uli has a strong Christian background and attends church regularly.

== Sources ==
- 2009 Deseret News Church Almanac (Salt Lake City, Utah: Deseret News, 2008) p. 327.
