= Nelson Adams (boxer) =

Puerto Rican boxer

Personal information
- Full name: Nelson Luis Adams
- Nationality: Puerto Rican
- Born: 5 March 1967 (age 59) Fajardo, Puerto Rico
- Weight: 81 kg (179 lb)

Sport
- Sport: Boxing
Medal record
Men's amateur boxing
Representing Puerto Rico
Pan American Games
Silver medal – second place	1987 Indianapolis	Light heavyweight

Nelson Luis Adams (born 5 March 1967) is a Puerto Rican former boxer. He competed in the 1988 Summer Olympics.
