= Krzysztof Rogowski (equestrian) =

Polish equestrian

Personal information
- Nationality: Polish
- Born: 11 January 1963 (age 62); Kościan, Poland

Sport
- Sport: Equestrian

Krzysztof Rogowski (born 11 January 1963) is a Polish equestrian. He competed in two events at the 1988 Summer Olympics.
