= Valerio Donnianni =

Italian sports shooter

Personal information
- Nationality: Italian
- Born: 16 January 1960 (age 65); Vercelli, Italy

Sport
- Sport: Sports shooting

Valerio Donnianni (born 16 January 1960) is an Italian former sports shooter. He competed at the 1988 Summer Olympics and the 1992 Summer Olympics.
