= Khristo Furnigov =

Bulgarian boxer

Personal information
- Born: November 25, 1966 (age 59) Lovech, Bulgaria
Medal record
Men's Boxing
Representing Bulgaria
European Amateur Championships
Bronze medal – third place	1989 Moscow	Light-Welterweight

Khristo Dimitrov Furnigov (Bulgarian: Христо Димитров Фурнигов; born November 25, 1966, in Granitovo, Lovech) is a retired boxer from Bulgaria, who competed for his native country at the 1988 Summer Olympics in Seoul, South Korea. There he was defeated in the quarterfinals of the Men's Welterweight Division (– 67 kg) by Kenya's eventual gold medalist Robert Wangila.
