= Joanna Helbin =

Polish archer (born 1960)

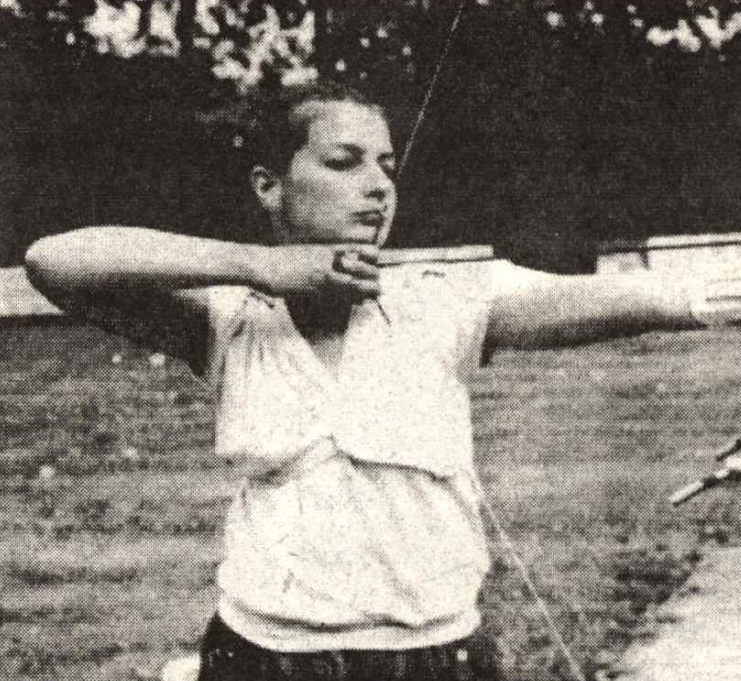

Personal information
- Nationality: Polish
- Born: 2 July 1960 (age 64); Prudnik, Poland

Sport
- Sport: Archery

Joanna Helbin (born 2 July 1960) is a Polish archer. She competed in the women's individual and team events at the 1988 Summer Olympics.
