= Song Gyeong-seop =

Korean male boxer

Personal information
- Nationality: South Korean
- Born: 29 March 1963 (age 61)

Sport
- Sport: Boxing

Song Gyeong-seop (born 29 March 1963) is a South Korean boxer. He competed in the men's welterweight event at the 1988 Summer Olympics.
