= Terry Dixon (boxer) =

Jamaican boxer (born 1966)

Personal information
- Nationality: Jamaican
- Born: 29 July 1966 (age 60) London, England

Sport
- Sport: Boxing

Terry Dixon (born 29 July 1966) is a Jamaican boxer. He competed in the men's light heavyweight event at the 1988 Summer Olympics.
