= Humberto Aranda =

Costa Rican boxer (born 1966)

Personal information
- Born: 14 March 1966 (age 59); San José, Costa Rica

Sport
- Sport: Boxing

Humberto Aranda (born 14 March 1966) is a Costa Rican former professional boxer who competed from 1992 to 2008, challenging for the WBC light middleweight title in 1999. As an amateur, he competed in the men's welterweight event at the 1988 Summer Olympics.
