= José García (boxer) =

Venezuelan boxer (born 1968)

José García (born May 4, 1968) is a Venezuelan former professional boxer. At the 1988 Summer Olympics he lost in the second round of the men's welterweight division (– 67 kg) to Poland's eventual bronze medalist Jan Dydak.
