= Adewale Adegbusi =

Nigerian boxer

Personal information
- Nationality: Nigerian
- Born: 3 March 1958 (age 67)
- Weight: 67 kg (148 lb)

Sport
- Sport: Boxing

Adewale Adegbusi (born 3 March 1958) is a Nigerian boxer. He competed in the 1988 Summer Olympics, where he lost in the quarterfinals of the welterweight competition to Jan Dydak.
