= Rund Kanika =

Zairean boxer (born 1963)

Personal information
- Born: 15 July 1963 (age 62) Kinshasa, Zaire
Medal record
Men's Boxing
Representing Zaire
All-Africa Games
Gold medal – first place	1987 Nairobi	Light-heavyweight

Rund Kanika (born 15 July 1963) is a boxer from Zaire, who competed in the light-heavyweight (– 81 kg) division at the 1988 Summer Olympics. Danika lost his opening bout to Osmond Imadiyi of Nigeria. Kanika won the gold medal in the light-heavyweight division at the 1987 All-Africa Games, defeating Mustapha Moussa of Algeria in the final.
