= Osmond Imadiyi =

Nigerian boxer

Personal information
- Nationality: Nigerian
- Born: 4 November 1962 (age 62)

Sport
- Sport: Boxing

Osmond Imadiyi (born 4 November 1962) is a Nigerian boxer. He competed in the men's light heavyweight event at the 1988 Summer Olympics.
