= Park Byeong-jin =

Korean male boxer

Personal information
- Nationality: South Korean
- Born: 10 January 1966 (age 59)

Sport
- Sport: Boxing

Park Byeong-jin (born 10 January 1966) is a South Korean boxer. He competed in the men's light heavyweight event at the 1988 Summer Olympics.
