= Dorota Chylak =

Polish swimmer (born 1966)

Personal information
- Nationality: Polish
- Born: 14 November 1966 (age 59) Warsaw, Poland

Sport
- Sport: Swimming

Dorota Chylak (born 14 November 1966) is a Polish breaststroke swimmer. She competed in two events at the 1988 Summer Olympics.
