= Beata Iwanek =

Polish archer (born 1964)

Personal information
- Full name: Beata Iwanek-Rozwód
- Born: 19 February 1964 (age 61) Ustronie Morskie, Poland
- Height: 171 cm (5 ft 7 in)
- Weight: 62 kg (137 lb)

Sport
- Country: Poland
- Sport: Archery
- Club: Kotwicy Kolobrzeg

Beata Iwanek-Rozwód (born 19 February 1964) is a Polish archer. She competed in the women's individual and team events at the 1988 Summer Olympics.
