= Andrea Magi =

Italian boxer (born 1966)

Personal information
- Born: 14 July 1966 (age 60) Pesaro, Pesaro e Urbino, Italy

Sport
- Sport: Boxing
- Weight class: Light heavyweight
Medal record
Men's Boxing
Representing Italy
European Amateur Championships
Bronze medal – third place	1987 Turin	Light Heavyweight

Andrea Magi (born 14 July 1966 in Pesaro, Pesaro e Urbino) is a former amateur boxer from Italy. He is best known for winning the bronze medal at the 1987 European Championships in Turin, Italy in the Men's Light Heavyweight (– 81 kg) division. He represented his native country at the 1988 Summer Olympics in Seoul, South Korea.

== Professional boxing record ==
20 Wins (7 knockouts, 13 decisions), 4 Losses (2 knockouts, 2 decisions) Archived January 18, 2015, at the Wayback Machine
Result	Record	Opponent	Type	Round	Date	Location	Notes
Loss	36-0	(Poland) Dariusz "Tiger" Michalczewski	TKO	4	20/03/1998	Frankfurt, Hesse, Germany	WBO World Light Heavyweight Title.
Win	0-12	(Hungary) Ignacio Orsola	TKO	1	15/02/1998	Rijeka, Croatia	
Win	1-39	(Belgium) Frank Wuestenberghs	PTS	6	06/12/1997	Catanzaro, Calabria, Italy	
Loss	30-1	(Netherlands) "Fast" Eddy Smulders	TKO	2	20/01/1996	Marsala, Sicily, Italy	EBU Light Heavyweight Title.
Win	2-3	(Hungary) Karoly Kovacs	TKO	5	01/09/1995	Supino, Lazio, Italy	
Win	12-5	(Italy) Pietro Pellizzaro	PTS	8	22/10/1994	Pesaro, Marche, Italy	
Loss	23-0	(Germany) "Gentleman" Henry Maske	UD	12	04/06/1994	Dortmund, North Rhine-Westphalia, Germany	IBF World Light Heavyweight Title. 114-117, 112-117, 110-119.
Loss	17-1	(United States) Leeonzer Barber	UD	12	29/09/1993	Pesaro, Marche, Italy	WBO World Light Heavyweight Title. 113-116, 114-115, 113-115.
Win	11-18-2	(United States) Sylvester White	PTS	8	30/04/1993	Pesaro, Marche, Italy	
Win	8-15-3	(Belgium) Renald De Vulder	TKO	2	22/10/1992	Verbania, Piedmont, Italy	
Win	17-6-1	(Italy) Marco Rinaldo	TKO	11	24/06/1992	Godiasco, Lombardy, Italy	Italy Light Heavyweight Title.
Win	10-3	(Italy) Salvatore Di Salvatore	PTS	12	12/03/1992	Pesaro, Marche, Italy	Italy Light Heavyweight Title.
Win	8-11	(United Kingdom) Simon McDougall	TKO	5	19/10/1991	Terni, Umbria, Italy	
Win	17-5-1	(Italy) Marco Rinaldo	UD	12	01/06/1991	Ragusa, Sicily, Italy	Italy Light Heavyweight Title.
Win	20-9	(France) Jean-Noel Camara	PTS	4	12/01/1991	(Aosta Valley) Saint Vincent d'Aoste, Valle d'Aosta, Italy	
Win	1-0	(Hungary) Janos Ferenc Dobai	PTS	6	12/10/1990	Pesaro, Marche, Italy	
Win	3-3	(Zaire) Serge Kabongo	PTS	6	02/06/1990	Rome, Lazio, Italy	
Win	4-0-1	(United Kingdom) James "Sting" Wray	DQ	3	29/11/1989	Pesaro, Marche, Italy	
Win	6-5-1	(United Kingdom) John "Ashes to" Ashton	PTS	6	07/10/1989	Pesaro, Marche, Italy	
Win	0-21-3	(Zaire) Kabunda Kamanga	KO	3	28/07/1989	Cecina, Tuscany, Italy	
Win	2-5-3	(Belgium) Renald De Vulder	TKO	1	14/07/1989	San Vincenzo, Tuscany, Italy	
Win	8-11-2	(France) Oliver Kemayou	PTS	6	03/06/1989	Pesaro, Marche, Italy	
Win	0-4	(Luxembourg) Ngoy Muamba	PTS	6	29/04/1989	Vasto, Abruzzo, Italy	
Win	0-3	(Luxembourg) Ngoy Muamba	PTS	6	24/02/1989	Pesaro, Marche, Italy	
