= Joseph Akhasamba =

Kenyan boxer (born 1963)

Personal information
- Born: 20 June 1963 (age 63) Nairobi, Kenya
Medal record
Men's Boxing
Representing Kenya
Commonwealth Games
Gold medal – first place	1990 Auckland	Light Heavyweight

Joseph Mukuku Akhasamba (born 20 June 1963 in Nairobi) is a Kenyan retired professional boxer who held the African heavyweight title from 1998 to 1999. As an amateur, he represented his native country at two consecutive Summer Olympics, starting in 1988. He won the gold medal in the men's light heavyweight division (– 81 kg) at the 1990 Commonwealth Games in Auckland, New Zealand.
