= Ahmed El-Nagar =

Egyptian boxer (born 1964)

Personal information
- Nationality: Egyptian
- Born: 19 February 1964 (age 62)

Sport
- Sport: Boxing

Ahmed El-Nagar (born 19 February 1964) is an Egyptian boxer. He competed at the 1984 Summer Olympics and the 1988 Summer Olympics.
