= Andrew Maynard (boxer) =

American boxer (born 1964)

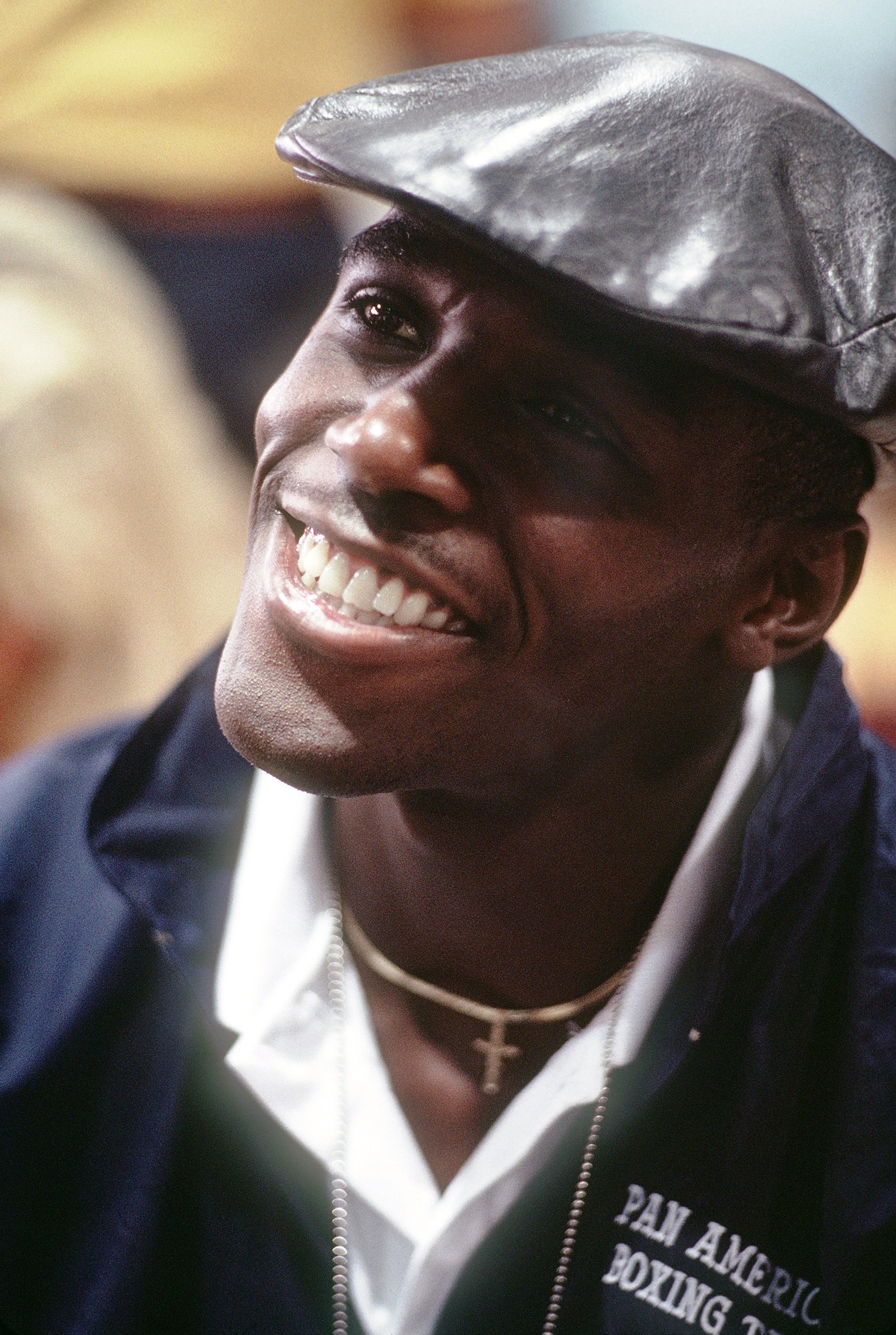
- Maynard at the 1987 Pan American Games

Personal information
- Born: April 8, 1964 (age 62) Cheverly, Maryland, U.S.
Medal record
Men's boxing
Representing the United States
Olympic Games
Gold medal – first place	1988 Seoul	Light heavyweight
Pan American Games
Bronze medal – third place	1987 Indianapolis	Light heavyweight

Andrew Maynard (born April 8, 1964) is an American former professional boxer who competed from 1989 to 2000. As an amateur boxer, he won the gold medal in the Light Heavyweight division at the 1988 Summer Olympics in Seoul, South Korea.

== Military service ==
Andrew Maynard, a 1982 graduate of Suitland High School in Prince George's County, Maryland, joined the National Guard in 1985. Maynard was later reassigned to special duty with the Fort Carson boxing team after receiving the approval of his company commander to pursue his goal of competing in the 1988 Summer Olympics. Maynard's final military rank was specialist.

== Amateur career ==
Maynard began his amateur career in the fall of 1984, winning four consecutive bouts in an amateur boxing tournament at the Ohio State Fair.

Maynard was the 1987 and 1988 United States Amateur Boxing Champion in the Light Heavyweight division (178 lbs.). He won the bronze medal at the 1987 Pan American Games, where he beat up on Cuban world champion Pablo Romero only to collapse in the second round without being hit. Later, Maynard acknowledged that he had sustained a broken ankle during a pickup basketball game the day before the Romero bout but didn't tell anybody about it. At the 1988 Summer Olympics, Maynard methodically avoided all basketball courts in Seoul.

At the Pan Am Box-Offs (178 lbs.) held in July 1987 at the International Center of the Broadmoor in Colorado Springs, Colorado, Maynard defeated Joseph Pemberton.

In the United States Olympic Box-Offs held from July 16–17, 1988, at Caesars Palace in Las Vegas, Nevada, Maynard had to earn a spot on the 1988 United States Olympic Boxing Team as the selected "most noteworthy opponent" by defeating fellow soldier Alfred "Ice" Cole in two bouts on consecutive nights. The judges' scores for each respective bout was 4–1 in favor of Maynard.

He was one of three amateur boxers who lost in the Olympic trials but made the 1988 United States Olympic Boxing Team by attaining two wins in the United States Olympic Box-Offs.

Maynard went on to win the Light Heavyweight Gold Medal for the United States at the 1988 Summer Olympics in Seoul. Along with "King" Kennedy McKinney (Bantamweight division) and "Merciless" Ray Mercer (Heavyweight division), Maynard was one of three Americans to capture gold for the 1988 United States Olympic Boxing Team in Seoul. He was the first American to win the Light Heavyweight Gold Medal since Leon Spinks in 1976. Maynard is one of seven Americans to win the Light Heavyweight Gold Medal in the history of the Olympic Games, including Muhammad Ali in 1960.

== Professional career ==
Following the Olympics, Maynard made the decision to move to Laurel, Maryland where he began his professional career by signing with the management team of "Sugar" Ray Leonard and Mike Trainer and training with Jose "Pepe" Correa. Maynard was one of five Olympic medalists making their professional debuts on February 24, 1989, in a boxing card held in Atlantic City, New Jersey. He knocked out Zack Worthy at 2:49 of the first round.

Maynard beat Mike Sedillo for the NABF Light Heavyweight Title by a majority decision on April 1, 1990, in Lake Tahoe, Nevada. Although knocked down twice in the sixth round, Maynard consistently landed punches with both hands throughout the 12-round bout. Maynard won his first 12 bouts prior to getting stopped in the seventh round by Bobby Czyz on June 24, 1990, in Atlantic City, New Jersey.

Maynard accumulated a six-fight winning streak, stopping former world light heavyweight champion Matthew Saad Muhammad in October 1991 after a barrage of punches thrown over a little more than two rounds and setting up a bout with Frank Tate on January 10, 1992. Tate dropped Maynard in the 11th round, prompting the referee to halt the action. Maynard lost his championship belt to Tate after having successfully defending it on four occasions.

Maynard moved up to cruiserweight to challenge WBC World Cruiserweight champion Anaclet Wamba in a title bout held in Paris, France on October 16, 1992. Knocked down in the first round, he lost by a 12-round unanimous decision with one judge having the bout as close as 113–116.

The championship bout versus Wamba was Maynard's only world title opportunity and only his second bout scheduled in the cruiserweight division. After losing to Wamba, Maynard fought on in obscurity. Among his notable fights which followed were a knockout loss to Thomas Hearns and a stoppage at heavyweight to Brian Nielsen.

== Later life ==
Maynard retired in 2000 and lives in Harlingen, Texas with his common law wife, Cynthia Ann Montgomery. Maynard is the father of three children.

In March 1996, the Country of Nicaragua issued a stamp in honor of Maynard and in his likeness. He was inducted into the "Maryland State Athletic Hall of Fame" in 2001. The MSAHOF Class of 2001 commemorative plaque, listing Maynard, hangs on a brick facade on Eutaw Street Plaza at Oriole Park at Camden Yards in Baltimore, Maryland. Maynard was a 2016 inductee of the "Washington, D.C. Boxing Hall of Fame" and, in 2019, was one of five members of the Inaugural Class of Texas' "Rio Grande Valley Boxing Hall of Fame".

== Professional boxing record ==
26 Wins (21 knockouts, 5 decisions), 13 Losses (9 knockouts, 4 decisions), 1 Draw
Result	Record	Opponent	Type	Round	Date	Location	Notes
Loss	14–1–1	(United States) Gary "The Whip" Wilcox	TKO	10	20/10/2000	(United States) Albany, New York, U.S.	
Win	14–10	(United States) Tyler "Working Man" Hughes	SD	6	29/04/2000	(United States) Scottsbluff, Nebraska, U.S.	
Loss	15–22–5	(United States) John "Killer" Kiser	TKO	1	05/02/2000	(United States) Denver, Colorado, U.S.	Referee stopped the bout at 1:59 of the first round.
Win	3–1	(United States) Joe Escamilla	TKO	5	25/09/1999	(United States) Scottsbluff, Nebraska, U.S.	
Draw	7–3–2	(United States) Leon "Shades of" Gray	PTS	6	29/07/1999	(United States) Denver, Colorado, U.S.	
Loss	29–0	(Denmark) "Super" Brian Nielsen	TKO	6	18/10/1996	Vejle, Denmark	
Loss	12–4–1	(Australia) Justin Fortune	TD	4	29/05/1996	(United States) Rochester, Washington, U.S.	
Loss	14–0	(Germany) Torsten May	KO	10	20/04/1996	Düsseldorf, Germany	
Loss	33–1	(United States) Kenny Keene	UD	10	13/03/1996	(United States) Los Angeles, California, U.S.	
Loss	18–0	(Russia) Sergei Kobozev	TKO	10	27/08/1994	(United States) Miami Beach, Florida, U.S.	USBA Cruiserweight Title. Referee stopped the bout at 1:37 of the tenth round.
Win	15–36–2	(United States) Danny Wofford	PTS	8	20/07/1994	(United States) Raleigh, North Carolina, U.S.	
Win	16–7–1	(United States) Tim "Scrap Iron" Johnson	TKO	2	11/05/1994	(United States) Annandale, Virginia, U.S.	Referee stopped the bout at 2:36 of the second round.
Win	7–11	(United States) Alonzo Cutchins	TKO	1	02/04/1994	(United States) Richmond, Virginia, U.S.	Referee stopped the bout at 1:32 of the first round.
Loss	50–4–1	(United States) Thomas "Hitman" Hearns	TKO	1	06/11/1993	(United States) Las Vegas, Nevada, U.S.	Referee stopped the bout at 2:34 of the first round.
Loss	10–0	(Canada) Egerton Marcus	RTD	8	22/05/1993	(United States) Washington, D.C., U.S.	NABF Light Heavyweight Title.
Win	7–8	(United States) Larry Davis	KO	2	26/03/1993	(United States) Erie, Pennsylvania, U.S.	
Loss	26–5	(France) Eric Nicoletta	UD	10	29/01/1993	Nimes, France	
Win	3–9–1	(United States) Charles Price	TKO – referee stoppage	7	09/12/1992	(United States) Virginia Beach, U.S.	
Loss	38–2	(France) Anaclet Wamba	UD	12	16/10/1992	Bercy, France	WBC Cruiserweight Title.
Win	16–6	(United States) Jeff McCall	KO	4	29/08/1992	(United States) Fredericksburg, Virginia, U.S.	McCall knocked out at 2:12 of the fourth round.
Loss	28–2	(United States) Frank Tate	TKO	11	Jan 10, 1992	(United States) New York City, U.S.	NABF Light Heavyweight Title.
Win	39–14–3	(United States) Matthew Saad Muhammad	TKO	3	29/10/1991	(United States) Washington, D.C., U.S.	Referee stopped the bout at 0:20 of the third round.
Win	13–1–1	(United States) Ed Mack	TKO	10	18/06/1991	(United States) Washington, D.C., U.S.	NABF Light Heavyweight Title. Referee stopped the bout at 2:41 of the tenth round.
Win	9–0–1	(United States) Govoner Chavers	TKO	12	20/04/1991	(United States) Stateline, Nevada, U.S.	NABF Light Heavyweight Title.
Win	10–3–1	(United States) "Lightning" Lenzie Morgan	TKO	8	26/02/1991	(United States) Washington, D.C., U.S.	NABF Light Heavyweight Title. Referee stopped the bout at 1:02 of the eighth round.
Win	19–24	(United States) Robert Curry	TKO	5	24/01/1991	(United States) Owings Mills, Maryland, U.S.	Referee stopped the bout at 2:45 of the fifth round.
Win	12–9–1	(United States) Keith "Sir Jabalot" McMurray	UD	8	25/10/1990	(United States) Las Vegas, Nevada, U.S.	
Loss	35–5	(United States) Bobby "Matinee Idol" Czyz	KO	7	24/06/1990	(United States) Atlantic City, New Jersey, U.S.	Maynard knocked out at 0:42 of the seventh round.
Win	14–4	(United States) Art Jimmerson	RTD	3	29/04/1990	(United States) Atlantic City, New Jersey, U.S.	NABF Light Heavyweight Title.
Win	22–7	(Mexico) Mike Sedillo	MD	12	01/04/1990	(United States) Stateline, Nevada, U.S.	NABF Light Heavyweight Title.
Win	15–4–2	(United States) Kemper Morton	TKO	3	02/02/1990	(United States) Las Vegas, Nevada, U.S.	
Win	11–3–2	(United States) Mike DeVito	UD	8	07/12/1989	(United States) Las Vegas, Nevada, U.S.	
Win	5–5	(United States) Carl "Little Truth" Williams	TKO	5	12/09/1989	(United States) Atlantic City, New Jersey, U.S.	
Win	7–11–1	(United States) Arthur "Butch" Hall	KO	5	15/08/1989	(United States) West Orange, New Jersey, U.S.	Hall knocked out at 0:46 of the fifth round.
Win	8–1	(United States) Greg Townes	KO	3	15/07/1989	(United States) Atlantic City, New Jersey, U.S.	
Win	12–5–1	(United States) "Cowboy" Stephen Schwann	TKO	1	12/06/1989	(United States) Las Vegas, Nevada, U.S.	Referee stopped the bout at 2:34 of the first round.
Win	5–9	(United States) John "King Bee" Keys	TKO	6	22/05/1989	(United States) Atlantic City, New Jersey, U.S.	Referee stopped the bout at 2:10 of the sixth round.
Win	1–2	(United States) Anthony Williams	TKO	2	18/04/1989	(United States) Atlantic City, New Jersey, U.S.	
Win	1–0	(United States) Rodney Brown	TKO	2	25/03/1989	(United States) Las Vegas, Nevada, U.S.	Referee stopped the bout at 2:29 of the second round.
Win	--	(United States) Zack Worthy	TKO	1	Feb 24, 1989	(United States) Atlantic City, New Jersey, U.S.	Referee stopped the bout at 2:49 of the first round.
