= Wrestling at the 1988 Summer Olympics – Men's Greco-Roman 90 kg =

Men's Greco-Roman 90 kg at the Games of the XXIV Olympiad
- Venue: Sangmu Gymnasium
- Dates: 18–20 September 1988
- Competitors: 22 from 22 nations

Medalists
1st place, gold medalist(s)		Atanas Komchev	Bulgaria
2nd place, silver medalist(s)		Harri Koskela	Finland
3rd place, bronze medalist(s)		Vladimir Popov	Soviet Union

The Men's Greco-Roman 90 kg at the 1988 Summer Olympics as part of the wrestling program were held at the Sangmu Gymnasium, Seongnam.

== Tournament results ==
The wrestlers are divided into 2 groups. The winner of each group decided by a double-elimination system.

Legend

- TF — Won by Fall
- SP — Won by Superiority, 12-14 points difference, the loser with points
- SO — Won by Superiority, 12-14 points difference, the loser without points
- ST — Won by Technical Superiority, 15 points difference
- PP — Won by Points, the loser with technical points
- PO — Won by Points, the loser without technical points
- P0 — Won by Passivity, scoring zero points
- P1 — Won by Passivity, while leading by 1-11 points
- PS — Won by Passivity, while leading by 12-14 points
- PA — Won by Opponent Injury
- DQ — Won by Forfeit
- DNA — Did not appear
- L — Losses
- ER — Round of Elimination
- CP — Classification Points
- TP — Technical Points

=== Eliminatory round ===
==== Group A ====
L		CP	TP		L
Round 1
0	Franz Pitschmann (AUT)	4-0 TF	4:47	Andrzej Malina (POL)	1
1	Yasutoshi Moriyama (JPN)	0-3 PO	0-2	Atanas Komchev (BUL)	0
1	Samba Adama (MTN)	0-4 TF	2:45	Georgios Pikilidis (GRE)	0
0	Christer Gulldén (SWE)	3-0 P1	3:24	Jean-François Court (FRA)	1
0	Even Bernshtein (ISR)	3-1 PP	11-8	Kamal Ibrahim (EGY)	1
0	Roberto Neves Filho (BRA)			Bye	
Round 2
1	Roberto Neves Filho (BRA)	0-3.5 SO	0-14	Franz Pitschmann (AUT)	0
1	Andrzej Malina (POL)	3-0 PO	2-0	Yasutoshi Moriyama (JPN)	2
0	Atanas Komchev (BUL)	4-0 TF	1:10	Samba Adama (MTN)	2
1	Georgios Pikilidis (GRE)	1-3 PP	1-5	Christer Gulldén (SWE)	0
1	Jean-François Court (FRA)	3-0 P1	4:02	Even Bernshtein (ISR)	1
1	Kamal Ibrahim (EGY)			Bye	
Round 3
1	Kamal Ibrahim (EGY)	4-0 ST	17-0	Roberto Neves Filho (BRA)	2
1	Franz Pitschmann (AUT)	1-3 PP	2-12	Atanas Komchev (BUL)	0
2	Andrzej Malina (POL)	0-3 PO	0-1	Christer Gulldén (SWE)	0
1	Georgios Pikilidis (GRE)	3-0 P1	5:13	Jean-François Court (FRA)	2
1	Even Bernshtein (ISR)			Bye	
Round 4
2	Even Bernshtein (ISR)	0-3 P1	5:26	Franz Pitschmann (AUT)	1
2	Kamal Ibrahim (EGY)	0-3 PO	0-9	Georgios Pikilidis (GRE)	1
0	Atanas Komchev (BUL)	3-0 PO	4-0	Christer Gulldén (SWE)	1
Round 5
2	Franz Pitschmann (AUT)	1-3 PP	1-3	Christer Gulldén (SWE)	1
0	Atanas Komchev (BUL)	3-1 PP	6-3	Georgios Pikilidis (GRE)	2

Wrestler	L	ER	CP
Atanas Komchev (BUL)	0	-	16
Christer Gulldén (SWE)	1	-	12
Franz Pitschmann (AUT)	2	5	12.5
Georgios Pikilidis (GRE)	2	5	12
Kamal Ibrahim (EGY)	2	4	5
Even Bernshtein (ISR)	2	4	3
Andrzej Malina (POL)	2	3	3
Jean-François Court (FRA)	2	3	3
Roberto Neves Filho (BRA)	2	3	0
Yasutoshi Moriyama (JPN)	2	2	0
Samba Adama (MTN)	2	2	0

==== Group B ====
L		CP	TP		L
Round 1
1	Moustapha Guèye (SEN)	0-4 TF	1:12	Vladimir Popov (URS)	0
1	Bernard Ban (YUG)	0-3 PO	0-4	Harri Koskela (FIN)	0
0	Sándor Major (HUN)	3-0 PO	3-0	Eom Jin-han (KOR)	1
0	Olaf Koschnitzke (GDR)	4-0 TF	4:20	Michael Foy (USA)	1
1	Doug Cox (CAN)	0-4 ST	0-16	Andreas Steinbach (FRG)	0
0	Jean-Baptiste Youmbi (CMR)			Bye	
Round 2
0	Jean-Baptiste Youmbi (CMR)	3-1 PP	11-5	Moustapha Guèye (SEN)	2
0	Vladimir Popov (URS)	4-0 ST	15-0	Bernard Ban (YUG)	2
0	Harri Koskela (FIN)	3-1 PP	3-2	Sándor Major (HUN)	1
2	Eom Jin-han (KOR)	0-3 PO	0-4	Olaf Koschnitzke (GDR)	0
1	Michial Foy (USA)	4-0 TF	0:19	Doug Cox (CAN)	2
0	Andreas Steinbach (FRG)			Bye	
Round 3
0	Andreas Steinbach (FRG)	3-0 P1	4:30	Jean-Baptiste Youmbi (CMR)	1
1	Vladimir Popov (URS)	1-3 PP	1-4	Harri Koskela (FIN)	0
1	Sándor Major (HUN)	3-1 PP	13-9	Olaf Koschnitzke (GDR)	1
1	Michial Foy (USA)			Bye	
Round 4
2	Michial Foy (USA)	1-3 PP	5-15	Andreas Steinbach (FRG)	0
2	Jean-Baptiste Youmbi (CMR)	0-4 TF	1:11	Harri Koskela (FIN)	0
1	Vladimir Popov (URS)	3-0 PO	4-0	Sándor Major (HUN)	2
1	Olaf Koschnitzke (GDR)			Bye	
Round 5
2	Olaf Koschnitzke (GDR)	0-4 TF	2:52	Vladimir Popov (URS)	1
1	Andreas Steinbach (FRG)	1-3 PP	1-2	Harri Koskela (FIN)	0
Round 6
2	Andreas Steinbach (FRG)	0-3 PO	0-3	Vladimir Popov (URS)	1
0	Harri Koskela (FIN)			Bye	

Wrestler	L	ER	CP
Harri Koskela (FIN)	0	-	16
Vladimir Popov (URS)	1	-	19
Andreas Steinbach (FRG)	2	6	11
Olaf Koschnitzke (GDR)	2	5	8
Sándor Major (HUN)	2	4	7
Michial Foy (USA)	2	4	5
Jean-Baptiste Youmbi (CMR)	2	4	3
Moustapha Guèye (SEN)	2	2	1
Doug Cox (CAN)	2	2	0
Eom Jin-han (KOR)	2	2	0
Bernard Ban (YUG)	2	2	0

=== Final round ===
	CP	TP	
7th place match
Georgios Pikilidis (GRE)	0-4 DQ		Olaf Koschnitzke (GDR)
5th place match
Franz Pitschmann (AUT)	0-3 P1	4:43	Andreas Steinbach (FRG)
Bronze medal match
Christer Gulldén (SWE)	0-4 TF	1:36	Vladimir Popov (URS)
Gold medal match
Atanas Komchev (BUL)	3-0 PO	4-0	Harri Koskela (FIN)

== Final standings ==
1. Atanas Komchev (BUL)
2. Harri Koskela (FIN)
3. Vladimir Popov (URS)
4. Christer Gulldén (SWE)
5. Andreas Steinbach (FRG)
6. Franz Pitschmann (AUT)
7. Olaf Koschnitzke (GDR)
