= Wrestling at the 1988 Summer Olympics – Men's freestyle 90 kg =

Olympic wrestling tournament

Men's freestyle 90 kg at the Games of the XXIV Olympiad
- Venue: Sangmu Gymnasium
- Dates: 27–29 September 1988
- Competitors: 28 from 28 nations

Medalists
1st place, gold medalist(s)		Makharbek Khadartsev	Soviet Union
2nd place, silver medalist(s)		Akira Ota	Japan
3rd place, bronze medalist(s)		Kim Tae-woo	South Korea

The Men's Freestyle 90 kg at the 1988 Summer Olympics as part of the wrestling program were held at the Sangmu Gymnasium, Seongnam.

== Tournament results ==
The wrestlers are divided into 2 groups. The winner of each group decided by a double-elimination system.

Legend

- TF — Won by Fall
- SP — Won by Superiority, 12-14 points difference, the loser with points
- SO — Won by Superiority, 12-14 points difference, the loser without points
- ST — Won by Technical Superiority, 15 points difference
- PP — Won by Points, the loser with technical points
- PO — Won by Points, the loser without technical points
- P0 — Won by Passivity, scoring zero points
- P1 — Won by Passivity, while leading by 1-11 points
- PS — Won by Passivity, while leading by 12-14 points
- PA — Won by Opponent Injury
- DQ — Won by Forfeit
- DNA — Did not appear
- L — Losses
- ER — Round of Elimination
- CP — Classification Points
- TP — Technical Points

=== Eliminatory round ===
==== Group A ====
L		CP	TP		L
Round 1
0	Akira Ota (JPN)	3-1 PP	12-6	Christian Iloanusi (NGR)	1
1	Walter Koenig (AUS)	0-4 TF	2:03	Abdul Majeed Maruwala (PAK)	0
1	Subhash Verma (IND)	1-3 PP	4-11	Gábor Tóth (HUN)	0
1	Doug Cox (CAN)	1-3 PP	7-10	Jim Scherr (USA)	0
0	Graeme English (GBR)	4-0 TF	2:13	Moustapha Guèye (SEN)	1
1	Samba Adama (MTN)	0-4 TF	2:45	Iraklis Deskoulidis (GRE)	0
1	Taj Mohammad Khairi (AFG)	1-3 PP	4-14	Mehmet Türkkaya (TUR)	0
Round 2
0	Akira Ota (JPN)	4-0 TF	1:12	Walter Koenig (AUS)	2
2	Christian Iloanusi (NGR)	0-3 P1	3:26	Abdul Majeed Maruwala (PAK)	0
1	Subhash Verma (IND)	4-0 ST	15-0	Doug Cox (CAN)	2
1	Gábor Tóth (HUN)	1-3 PP	1-3	Jim Scherr (USA)	0
0	Graeme English (GBR)	4-0 TF	1:24	Samba Adama (MTN)	2
2	Moustapha Guèye (SEN)	0-4 TF	1:30	Taj Mohammad Khairi (AFG)	1
1	Iraklis Deskoulidis (GRE)	0-0 DQ	5:09	Mehmet Türkkaya (TUR)	1
Round 3
0	Akira Ota (JPN)	4-0 TF	1:52	Abdul Majeed Maruwala (PAK)	1
2	Subhash Verma (IND)	1-3 PP	3-6	Jim Scherr (USA)	0
1	Gábor Tóth (HUN)	3-0 PO	10-0	Graeme English (GBR)	1
1	Iraklis Deskoulidis (GRE)	4-0 TF	1:52	Taj Mohammad Khairi (AFG)	2
1	Mehmet Türkkaya (TUR)			Bye	
Round 4
2	Mehmet Türkkaya (TUR)	0-4 TF	5:51	Akira Ota (JPN)	0
2	Abdul Majeed Maruwala (PAK)	1-3 PP	2-6	Gábor Tóth (HUN)	1
0	Jim Scherr (USA)	4-0 ST	15-0	Graeme English (GBR)	2
1	Iraklis Deskoulidis (GRE)			Bye	
Round 5
2	Iraklis Deskoulidis (GRE)	0-3 PO	0-4	Gábor Tóth (HUN)	1
0	Akira Ota (JPN)	4-0 TF	5:06	Jim Scherr (USA)	1
Round 6
1	Akira Ota (JPN)	1-3 PP	4-5	Gábor Tóth (HUN)	1
1	Jim Scherr (USA)			Bye	

Wrestler	L	ER	CP	Tiebreaker
Akira Ota (JPN)	1	-	20	5
Gábor Tóth (HUN)	1	-	16	4
Jim Scherr (USA)	1	-	13	3
Iraklis Deskoulidis (GRE)	2	5	8	
Abdul Majeed Maruwala (PAK)	2	4	8	
Graeme English (GBR)	2	4	8	
Mehmet Türkkaya (TUR)	2	4	3	
Subhash Verma (IND)	2	3	6	
Taj Mohammad Khairi (AFG)	2	3	5	
Doug Cox (CAN)	2	2	1	
Christian Iloanusi (NGR)	2	2	1	
Walter Koenig (AUS)	2	2	0	
Samba Adama (MTN)	2	2	0	
Moustapha Guèye (SEN)	2	2	0	

==== Group B ====
L		CP	TP		L
Round 1
0	Zevegiin Düvchin (MGL)	4-0 TF	1:20	Reuben Tucker (GUM)	1
1	Roberto Neves Filho (BRA)	1-3 PP	6-10	Hubert Bindels (BEL)	0
0	Rumen Alabakov (BUL)	3-1 PP	9-3	Jerzy Nieć (POL)	1
0	Mohamed Reza Tupchi (IRI)	3-1 PP	3-2	Bodo Lukowski (FRG)	1
1	Jean-Baptiste Youmbi (CMR)	0-4 ST	0-15	Makharbek Khadartsev (URS)	0
0	Kim Tae-woo (KOR)	3-1 PP	8-2	Ahmad Al-Shamy (SYR)	1
0	Edwin Lins (AUT)	4-0 TF	1:35	Bakary Sanneh (GAM)	1
Round 2
0	Zevegiin Düvchin (MGL)	3-1 PP	9-2	Roberto Neves Filho (BRA)	2
2	Reuben Tucker (GUM)	0-4 TF	0:36	Hubert Bindels (BEL)	0
0	Rumen Alabakov (BUL)	3-1 PP	3-2	Mohamed Reza Tupchi (IRI)	1
2	Jerzy Nieć (POL)	0-3 P1	5:08	Bodo Lukowski (FRG)	1
2	Jean-Baptiste Youmbi (CMR)	0–3.5 PS	4:41	Kim Tae-woo (KOR)	0
0	Makharbek Khadartsev (URS)	3-1 PP	10-1	Edwin Lins (AUT)	1
1	Ahmed Al-Shamy (SYR)	4-0 TF	1:55	Bakary Sanneh (GAM)	2
Round 3
0	Zevegiin Düvchin (MGL)	3-1 PP	3-1	Hubert Bindels (BEL)	1
0	Rumen Alabakov (BUL)	3-1 PP	3-2	Bodo Lukowski (FRG)	2
2	Mohamed Reza Tupchi (IRI)	0-3 P1	3:27	Kim Tae-woo (KOR)	0
0	Makharbek Khadartsev (URS)	4-0 TF	2:47	Ahmed Al-Shamy (SYR)	2
1	Edwin Lins (AUT)			Bye	
Round 4
1	Edwin Lins (AUT)	3-1 PP	6-5	Zevegiin Düvchin (MGL)	1
2	Hubert Bindels (BEL)	0-3 PO	0-9	Rumen Alabakov (BUL)	0
0	Makharbek Khadartsev (URS)	4-0 TF	3:54	Kim Tae-woo (KOR)	1
Round 5
2	Edwin Lins (AUT)	0-4 TF	1:41	Rumen Alabakov (BUL)	0
2	Zevegiin Düvchin (MGL)	0-4 TF	1:46	Makharbek Khadartsev (URS)	0
1	Kim Tae-woo (KOR)			Bye	
Round 6
1	Kim Tae-woo (KOR)	3-1 PP	5-3	Rumen Alabakov (BUL)	1
0	Makharbek Khadartsev (URS)			Bye	
Round 7
0	Makharbek Khadartsev (URS)	4-0 TF	5:27	Rumen Alabakov (BUL)	2
1	Kim Tae-woo (KOR)			Bye	

Wrestler	L	ER	CP
Makharbek Khadartsev (URS)	0	-	23
Kim Tae-woo (KOR)	1	-	12.5
Rumen Alabakov (BUL)	2	7	17
Zevegiin Düvchin (MGL)	2	5	11
Edwin Lins (AUT)	2	5	8
Hubert Bindels (BEL)	2	4	8
Bodo Lukowski (FRG)	2	3	5
Ahmed Al-Shamy (SYR)	2	3	5
Mohamed Reza Tupchi (IRI)	2	3	4
Roberto Neves Filho (BRA)	2	2	2
Jerzy Nieć (POL)	2	2	1
Jean-Baptiste Youmbi (CMR)	2	2	0
Bakary Sanneh (GAM)	2	2	0
Reuben Tucker (GUM)	2	2	0

=== Final round ===
	CP	TP	
7th place match
Iraklis Deskoulidis (GRE)	3-1 PP	4-2	Zevegiin Düvchin (MGL)
5th place match
Jim Scherr (USA)	3-1 PP	3-1	Rumen Alabakov (BUL)
Bronze medal match
Gábor Tóth (HUN)	0-3 PO	0-1	Kim Tae-woo (KOR)
Gold medal match
Akira Ota (JPN)	0-4 ST	0-16	Makharbek Khadartsev (URS)

== Final standings ==
1. Makharbek Khadartsev (URS)
2. Akira Ota (JPN)
3. Kim Tae-woo (KOR)
4. Gábor Tóth (HUN)
5. Jim Scherr (USA)
6. Rumen Alabakov (BUL)
7. Iraklis Deskoulidis (GRE)
8. Zevegiin Düvchin (MGL)
