= Wrestling at the 1984 Summer Olympics – Men's freestyle 90 kg =

Men's freestyle 90 kg at the Games of the XXIII Olympiad
- Venue: Anaheim Convention Center
- Dates: 7–9 August 1984
- Competitors: 16 from 16 nations

Medalists
1st place, gold medalist(s)		Ed Banach	United States
2nd place, silver medalist(s)		Akira Ota	Japan
3rd place, bronze medalist(s)		Noel Loban	Great Britain

The Men's Freestyle 90 kg at the 1984 Summer Olympics as part of the wrestling program were held at the Anaheim Convention Center, Anaheim, California.

== Medalists ==
Gold	Ed Banach; United States
Silver	Akira Ota; Japan
Bronze	Noel Loban; Great Britain

== Tournament results ==
The wrestlers are divided into 2 groups. The winner of each group decided by a double-elimination system.

Legend

- TF — Won by Fall
- ST — Won by Technical Superiority, 12 points difference
- PP — Won by Points, 1-7 points difference, the loser with points
- PO — Won by Points, 1-7 points difference, the loser without points
- SP — Won by Points, 8-11 points difference, the loser with points
- SO — Won by Points, 8-11 points difference, the loser without points
- P0 — Won by Passivity, scoring zero points
- P1 — Won by Passivity, while leading by 1-7 points
- PS — Won by Passivity, while leading by 8-11 points
- DC — Won by Decision, 0-0 score
- PA — Won by Opponent Injury
- DQ — Won by Forfeit
- DNA — Did not appear
- L — Losses
- ER — Round of Elimination
- CP — Classification Points
- TP — Technical Points

=== Eliminatory round ===
==== Group A ====
L		CP	TP		L
Round 1
1	Edwin Lins (AUT)	0-4 ST	2-15	Ed Banach (USA)	0
0	Abdul Majeed Maruwala (PAK)	4-0 ST	12-0	Ilie Matei (ROU)	1
0	İsmail Temiz (TUR)	3-1 PP	6-5	Frank Andersson (SWE)	1
1	Amadou Diop (SEN)	0-4 TF	2:05	Clark Davis (CAN)	0
Round 2
2	Edwin Lins (AUT)	1-3 PP	6-11	Abdul Majeed Maruwala (PAK)	0
0	Ed Banach (USA)	3.5-0 SO	11-0	İsmail Temiz (TUR)	1
1	Frank Andersson (SWE)	4-0 TF	1:17	Amadou Diop (SEN)	2
0	Clark Davis (CAN)			Bye	
1	Ilie Matei (ROU)			DNA	
Round 3
1	Clark Davis (CAN)	.5-3.5 SP	2-11	Ed Banach (USA)	0
1	Abdul Majeed Maruwala (PAK)	1-3 PP	3-3	İsmail Temiz (TUR)	1
1	Frank Andersson (SWE)			Bye	
Round 4
2	Frank Andersson (SWE)	1-3 PP	5-8	Clark Davis (CAN)	1
0	Ed Banach (USA)	4-0 TF	0:48	Abdul Majeed Maruwala (PAK)	2
1	İsmail Temiz (TUR)			Bye	
Final
	Ed Banach (USA)	3.5-0 SO	11-0	İsmail Temiz (TUR)	
	Clark Davis (CAN)	.5-3.5 SP	2-11	Ed Banach (USA)	
	İsmail Temiz (TUR)	0-4 TF	5:05	Clark Davis (CAN)	

Wrestler	L	ER	CP	Final
Ed Banach (USA)	0	-	15	7
Clark Davis (CAN)	1	-	7.5	4.5
İsmail Temiz (TUR)	1	-	6	0
Abdul Majeed Maruwala (PAK)	2	4	8	
Frank Andersson (SWE)	2	4	6	
Edwin Lins (AUT)	2	2	1	
Amadou Diop (SEN)	2	2	0	
Ilie Matei (ROU)	1	1	0	

==== Group B ====
L		CP	TP		L
Round 1
0	Akira Ota (JPN)	3-1 PP	7-1	Michele Azzola (ITA)	1
1	Abdul Breesam Rahman (IRQ)	1-3 PP	2-9	Jai Prakash (IND)	0
1	Bodo Lukowski (FRG)	0-3 P1	5:45	Noel Loban (GBR)	0
0	Macauley Appah (NGR)	3-1 PP	6-5	Mamadou Diallo (MTN)	1
Round 2
0	Akira Ota (JPN)	4-0 TF	1:15	Abdul Breesam Rahman (IRQ)	2
1	Michele Azzola (ITA)	4-0 TF	0:47	Jai Prakash (IND)	1
1	Bodo Lukowski (FRG)	4-0 TF	4:01	Macauley Appah (NGR)	1
0	Noel Loban (GBR)	4-0 TF	1:37	Mamadou Diallo (MTN)	2
Round 3
0	Akira Ota (JPN)	4-0 TF	2:09	Bodo Lukowski (FRG)	2
2	Michele Azzola (ITA)	0-4 TF	4:22	Noel Loban (GBR)	0
1	Macauley Appah (NGR)			Bye	
1	Jai Prakash (IND)			DNA	
Final
	Macauley Appah (NGR)	0-4 ST	0-13	Akira Ota (JPN)	
	Noel Loban (GBR)	4-0 TF	1:59	Macauley Appah (NGR)	
	Akira Ota (JPN)	3-1 PP	4-2	Noel Loban (GBR)	

Wrestler	L	ER	CP	Final
Akira Ota (JPN)	0	-	11	7
Noel Loban (GBR)	0	-	11	5
Macauley Appah (NGR)	1	-	3	0
Michele Azzola (ITA)	2	3	5	
Bodo Lukowski (FRG)	2	3	4	
Jai Prakash (IND)	1	2	3	
Abdul Breesam Rahman (IRQ)	2	2	1	
Mamadou Diallo (MTN)	2	2	1	

=== Final round ===
	CP	TP	
5th place match
İsmail Temiz (TUR)	0-4 PA		Macauley Appah (NGR)
Bronze medal match
Clark Davis (CAN)	1-3 PP	1-5	Noel Loban (GBR)
Gold medal match
Ed Banach (USA)	4-0 ST	15-3	Akira Ota (JPN)

== Final standings ==
1. Ed Banach (USA)
2. Akira Ota (JPN)
3. Noel Loban (GBR)
4. Clark Davis (CAN)
5. Macauley Appah (NGR)
6. İsmail Temiz (TUR)
7. Abdul Majeed Maruwala (PAK)
8. Frank Andersson (SWE)
