= 1987 European Wrestling Championships =

- Host city: Bulgaria, Veliko Tarnovo(Freestyle); Finland Tampere(Greco-Roman)
- Dates: 1 – 4 May 1987; 8 – 11 May 1987

Champions
- Freestyle: Soviet Union
- Greco-Roman: Soviet Union

The 1987 European Wrestling Championships were held in the men's Freestyle style in Veliko Tarnovo 1 – 4 May 1987; the Greco-Romane style in Tampere 8 – 11 May 1987.

== Medal table ==
| Rank | Nation | Gold | Silver | Bronze | Total |
|---|---|---|---|---|---|
| 1 | Soviet Union | 13 | 3 | 1 | 17 |
| 2 | Bulgaria | 5 | 4 | 6 | 15 |
| 3 | Finland | 1 | 2 | 2 | 5 |
| 4 | Italy | 1 | 0 | 0 | 1 |
| 5 | Romania | 0 | 3 | 0 | 3 |
| 6 | East Germany | 0 | 2 | 2 | 4 |
| 6 | Poland | 0 | 2 | 2 | 4 |
| 8 | Hungary | 0 | 1 | 2 | 3 |
| 9 | Greece | 0 | 1 | 0 | 1 |
| 9 | Sweden | 0 | 1 | 0 | 1 |
| 9 | Yugoslavia | 0 | 1 | 0 | 1 |
| 12 | Turkey | 0 | 0 | 3 | 3 |
| 13 | Czechoslovakia | 0 | 0 | 1 | 1 |
| 13 | France | 0 | 0 | 1 | 1 |
| Totals (14 entries) | | 20 | 20 | 20 | 60 |

== Medal summary ==
=== Men's freestyle ===
| Event | Gold | Silver | Bronze |
|---|---|---|---|
| 48 kg | Marian Nedkov; Bulgaria | Alin Păcuraru; Romania | Mario Willomeit; East Germany |
| 52 kg | Valentin Yordanov; Bulgaria | Vladimir Toguzov; Soviet Union | Aslan Seyhanlı; Turkey |
| 57 kg | Sergei Beloglazov; Soviet Union | Zoran Sorov; Yugoslavia | Gueorgui Kalchev; Bulgaria |
| 62 kg | Jazar Isayev; Soviet Union | Karsten Polky; East Germany | Marian Skubacz; Poland |
| 68 kg | Arsen Fadzaev; Soviet Union | Yeoryos Athanasiadis; Greece | Simeon Shterev Sr. Bulgaria |
| 74 kg | Adlan Varayev; Soviet Union | Pekka Rauhala; Finland | Fevzi Şeker; Turkey |
| 82 kg | Aleksandar Nanev; Bulgaria | Vladimir Modosian; Soviet Union | Jozef Lohyňa; Czechoslovakia |
| 90 kg | Makharbek Khadartsev; Soviet Union | Efraim Kamberov; Bulgaria | Reşit Karabacak; Turkey |
| 100 kg | Leri Khabelov; Soviet Union | Vasile Pușcașu; Romania | Gueorgui Yanchev; Bulgaria |
| 130 kg | Zaza Turmanidze; Soviet Union | Andreas Schröder; East Germany | Atanas Atanasov; Bulgaria |

=== Men's Greco-Roman ===
| Event | Gold | Silver | Bronze |
|---|---|---|---|
| 48 kg | Vincenzo Maenza; Italy | Bratan Tsenov; Bulgaria | Sergey Suvorov; Soviet Union |
| 52 kg | Andriy Kalashnykov; Soviet Union | Csaba Vadász; Hungary | Roman Kierpacz; Poland |
| 57 kg | Keijo Pehkonen; Finland | Emil Ivanov; Bulgaria | Patrice Mourier; France |
| 62 kg | Zhivko Vangelov; Bulgaria | Vasili Vozni; Soviet Union | Jenő Bódi; Hungary |
| 68 kg | Aslaudin Abayev; Soviet Union | Jerzy Kopański; Poland | Tapio Sipilä; Finland |
| 74 kg | Daulet Turlykhanov; Soviet Union | Jouko Salomäki; Finland | Dobri Ivanov; Bulgaria |
| 82 kg | Sergey Nasevich; Soviet Union | Bogdan Daras; Poland | Tibor Komáromi; Hungary |
| 90 kg | Vladimir Popov; Soviet Union | Atanas Komchev; Bulgaria | Harri Koskela; Finland |
| 100 kg | Ilia Vasilev; Bulgaria | Vasile Andrei; Romania | Jörg Kotte; East Germany |
| 130 kg | Igor Rostorotski; Soviet Union | Tomas Johansson; Sweden | Rangel Gerovski; Bulgaria |
