= 1989 European Wrestling Championships =

- Host city: Turkey, Ankara(Freestyle); Finland Oulu(Greco-Roman)
- Dates: 12 – 14 May 1989; 5 – 7 May 1989

Champions
- Freestyle: Soviet Union
- Greco-Roman: Soviet Union

The 1989 European Wrestling Championships were held in the men's Freestyle style in Ankara 12 – 14 May 1989; the Greco-Romane style in Oulu 5 – 7 May 1989.

== Medal table ==
Rank	Nation	Gold	Silver	Bronze	Total
1	Soviet Union	8	3	5	16
2	Bulgaria	4	3	4	11
3	Poland	2	2	0	4
4	Turkey	1	5	3	9
5	West Germany	1	1	3	5
6	Finland	1	1	1	3
7	Hungary	1	1	0	2
8	Yugoslavia	1	0	0	1
9	East Germany	0	2	1	3
10	Czechoslovakia	0	1	1	2
10	Sweden	0	1	1	2
12	Romania	0	1	0	1
13	France	0	0	1	1
13	Italy	0	0	1	1
Totals (14 entries)		19	21	21	61

== Medal summary ==
=== Men's freestyle ===
Event	Gold	Silver	Bronze
48 kg	Gnel Medzhlumyan; Soviet Union	İlyas Şükrüoğlu; Turkey	Reiner Heugabel; West Germany
52 kg	Valentin Yordanov; Bulgaria	Mijail Kushnir; Soviet Union	Aslan Seyhanlı; Turkey
57 kg	Ahmet Ak; Turkey	Kamaludin Abduldaikov; Soviet Union	Jürgen Scheibe; West Germany
62 kg	Alben Kumbarov; Bulgaria	Karsten Polky; East Germany	Giovanni Schillaci; Italy
68 kg	Nikolai Kasabov; Bulgaria	Georg Schwabenland; West Germany	Yüksel Dinçer; Turkey
74 kg	Nasir Gadžihanov; Soviet Union	Valentin Zhelev; Bulgaria	Fevzi Şeker; Turkey
82 kg	—	Necmi Gençalp; Turkey; Jozef Lohyňa; Czechoslovakia	Elmadi Zhabrailov; Soviet Union
90 kg	Vagab Kazibekov; Soviet Union	Mehmet Türkkaya; Turkey	Dimitri Markov; Bulgaria
100 kg	Arawat Sabejew; Soviet Union	Hayri Sezgin; Turkey	Stoyan Nenchev; Bulgaria
130 kg	Aslan Khadartsev; Soviet Union	Ayhan Taşkın; Turkey	Kiril Barbutov; Bulgaria

=== Men's Greco-Roman ===
Event	Gold	Silver	Bronze
48 kg	Markus Scherer; West Germany	Daniel Yankov; Bulgaria	Oleg Kutscherenko; Soviet Union
52 kg	Senad Rizvanović; Yugoslavia	Ismo Kamesaki; Finland	Valentin Krumov; Bulgaria
57 kg	Keijo Pehkonen; Finland	Emil Ivanov; Bulgaria	Sergei Bulanov; Soviet Union
62 kg	Ryszard Wolny; Poland	József Szuromi; Hungary	Guennadi Atmakin; Soviet Union
68 kg	Attila Repka; Hungary	Mnatsakan Iskandaryan; Soviet Union	Jukka Loikas; Finland; Ghani Yalouz; France
74 kg	Petar Tenev; Bulgaria	Torbjörn Kornbakk; Sweden	Jaroslav Zeman; Czechoslovakia
82 kg	Mikhail Mamiashvili; Soviet Union	Piotr Stępień; Poland	Olaf Koschnitzke; East Germany
90 kg	Vladimir Popov; Soviet Union	Maik Bullmann; East Germany	Andreas Steinbach; West Germany
100 kg	Andrzej Wroński; Poland	Ion Ieremciuc; Romania	Viacheslav Klimenko; Soviet Union
130 kg	Alexandr Karelin; Soviet Union	Sławomir Zrobek; Poland	Tomas Johansson; Sweden
