= Wrestling at the 1984 Summer Olympics – Men's Greco-Roman 90 kg =

Men's Greco-Roman 90 kg at the Games of the XXIII Olympiad
- Venue: Anaheim Convention Center
- Dates: 30 July–1 August 1984
- Competitors: 13 from 13 nations

Medalists
1st place, gold medalist(s)		Steve Fraser	United States
2nd place, silver medalist(s)		Ilie Matei	Romania
3rd place, bronze medalist(s)		Frank Andersson	Sweden

The Men's Greco-Roman 90 kg at the 1984 Summer Olympics as part of the wrestling program were held at the Anaheim Convention Center, Anaheim, California.

== Medalists ==
Gold	Steve Fraser; United States
Silver	Ilie Matei; Romania
Bronze	Frank Andersson; Sweden

== Tournament results ==
The wrestlers are divided into 2 groups. The winner of each group decided by a double-elimination system.

Legend

- TF — Won by Fall
- ST — Won by Technical Superiority, 12 points difference
- PP — Won by Points, 1-7 points difference, the loser with points
- PO — Won by Points, 1-7 points difference, the loser without points
- SP — Won by Points, 8-11 points difference, the loser with points
- SO — Won by Points, 8-11 points difference, the loser without points
- P0 — Won by Passivity, scoring zero points
- P1 — Won by Passivity, while leading by 1-7 points
- PS — Won by Passivity, while leading by 8-11 points
- DC — Won by Decision, 0-0 score
- PA — Won by Opponent Injury
- DQ — Won by Forfeit
- DNA — Did not appear
- L — Losses
- ER — Round of Elimination
- CP — Classification Points
- TP — Technical Points

=== Eliminatory round ===
==== Group A ====
L		CP	TP		L
Round 1
1	Karolj Kopas (YUG)	1-3 PP	4-5	Georgios Pozidis (GRE)	0
1	Abdul Breesam Rahman (IRQ)	0-4 TF	1:01	Frank Andersson (SWE)	0
1	Garry Kallos (CAN)	.5-3.5 SP	3-11	Toni Hannula (FIN)	0
0	Steve Fraser (USA)			Bye	
Round 2
0	Steve Fraser (USA)	3-1 PP	4-1	Karolj Kopas (YUG)	2
0	Georgios Pozidis (GRE)	4-0 ST	15-3	Abdul Breesam Rahman (IRQ)	2
0	Frank Andersson (SWE)	4-0 ST	15-3	Garry Kallos (CAN)	2
0	Toni Hannula (FIN)			Bye	
Round 3
1	Toni Hannula (FIN)	0-3 P1	4:18	Steve Fraser (USA)	0
1	Georgios Pozidis (GRE)	0-3 PO	0-6	Frank Andersson (SWE)	0
Round 4
2	Toni Hannula (FIN)	0-3 P1	5:13	Georgios Pozidis (GRE)	1
0	Steve Fraser (USA)	3-1 PP	4-1	Frank Andersson (SWE)	1
Final
	Georgios Pozidis (GRE)	0-3 PO	0-6	Frank Andersson (SWE)	
	Steve Fraser (USA)	3-1 PP	4-1	Frank Andersson (SWE)	
	Steve Fraser (USA)	3-1 PP	2-1	Georgios Pozidis (GRE)	

Wrestler	L	ER	CP	Final
Steve Fraser (USA)	0	-	9	6
Frank Andersson (SWE)	1	-	12	4
Georgios Pozidis (GRE)	1	-	10	1
Toni Hannula (FIN)	2	4	3.5	
Karolj Kopas (YUG)	2	2	2	
Garry Kallos (CAN)	2	2	0.5	
Abdul Breesam Rahman (IRQ)	2	2	0	

==== Group B ====
L		CP	TP		L
Round 1
0	Jean-François Court (FRA)	3.5-.5 SP	13-4	Franz Marx (AUT)	1
1	Hiroshi Hase (JPN)	0-4 ST	0-13	Ilie Matei (ROU)	0
0	Uwe Sachs (FRG)	3.5-.5 SP	10-1	Kamal Ibrahim (EGY)	1
Round 2
0	Jean-François Court (FRA)	3-0 PO	4-0	Hiroshi Hase (JPN)	2
2	Franz Marx (AUT)	1-3 PP	4-7	Uwe Sachs (FRG)	0
0	Ilie Matei (ROU)	4-0 ST	13-0	Kamal Ibrahim (EGY)	2
Final
	Jean-François Court (FRA)	0-3 P1	5:11	Ilie Matei (ROU)	
	Uwe Sachs (FRG)	3-1 DC	0-0	Jean-François Court (FRA)	
	Ilie Matei (ROU)	3-0 P1	5:10	Uwe Sachs (FRG)	

Wrestler	L	ER	CP	Final
Ilie Matei (ROU)	0	-	8	6
Uwe Sachs (FRG)	0	-	6.5	3
Jean-François Court (FRA)	0	-	6.5	1
Franz Marx (AUT)	2	2	1.5	
Kamal Ibrahim (EGY)	2	2	0.5	
Hiroshi Hase (JPN)	2	2	0	

=== Final round ===
	CP	TP	
5th place match
Georgios Pozidis (GRE)	1-3 PP	2-4	Jean-François Court (FRA)
Bronze medal match
Frank Andersson (SWE)	3-0 PO	5-0	Uwe Sachs (FRG)
Gold medal match
Steve Fraser (USA)	3-1 PP	1-1	Ilie Matei (ROU)

== Final standings ==
1. Steve Fraser (USA)
2. Ilie Matei (ROU)
3. Frank Andersson (SWE)
4. Uwe Sachs (FRG)
5. Jean-François Court (FRA)
6. Georgios Pozidis (GRE)
7. Toni Hannula (FIN)
8. Karolj Kopas (YUG)
