= Wrestling at the 1992 Summer Olympics – Men's freestyle 90 kg =

Men's freestyle 90 kg at the Games of the XXV Olympiad
- Venue: Institut Nacional d'Educació Física de Catalunya
- Dates: 5–7 August 1992
- Competitors: 17 from 17 nations

Medalists
1st place, gold medalist(s)		Makharbek Khadartsev	Unified Team
2nd place, silver medalist(s)		Kenan Şimşek	Turkey
3rd place, bronze medalist(s)		Chris Campbell	United States

The men's freestyle 90 kilograms at the 1992 Summer Olympics as part of the wrestling program were held at the Institut Nacional d'Educació Física de Catalunya from August 5 to August 7. The wrestlers are divided into 2 groups. The winner of each group decided by a double-elimination system.

== Results ==
=== Elimination A ===
==== Round 1 ====
	Score		CP
Roberto Limonta (CUB)	2–1	Gregory Edgelow (CAN)	3–1 PP
Makharbek Khadartsev (EUN)	7–0	Chris Campbell (USA)	3–0 PO
Grant Parker (NZL)	0–3 Fall	Akira Ota (JPN)	0–4 TO
Renato Lombardo (ITA)	1–0	Jozef Palatinus (TCH)	3–0 PO
Ludwig Schneider (GER)		Bye	

==== Round 2 ====
	Score		CP
Ludwig Schneider (GER)	0–10	Roberto Limonta (CUB)	0–3 PO
Gregory Edgelow (CAN)	0–6	Makharbek Khadartsev (EUN)	0–3 PO
Chris Campbell (USA)	15–0	Grant Parker (NZL)	4–0 ST
Akira Ota (JPN)	0–0	Renato Lombardo (ITA)	0–0 D2
Jozef Palatinus (TCH)		Bye	

==== Round 3 ====
	Score		CP
Jozef Palatinus (TCH)	0–2	Ludwig Schneider (GER)	0–3 PO
Roberto Limonta (CUB)	2–7	Makharbek Khadartsev (EUN)	1–3 PP
Chris Campbell (USA)	4–0	Akira Ota (JPN)	3–0 PO
Renato Lombardo (ITA)		Bye	

==== Round 4 ====
	Score		CP
Renato Lombardo (ITA)	1–6	Roberto Limonta (CUB)	1–3 PP
Ludwig Schneider (GER)	1–7	Makharbek Khadartsev (EUN)	1–3 PP
Chris Campbell (USA)		Bye	

==== Round 5 ====
	Score		CP
Chris Campbell (USA)	5–4	Roberto Limonta (CUB)	3–1 PP
Makharbek Khadartsev (EUN)		Bye	
Renato Lombardo (ITA)	2–0	Ludwig Schneider (GER)	3–0 PO

- Ludwig Schneider (GER) and Renato Lombardo (ITA) were tied on classification points for fourth.

==== Summary ====
Pos	Athlete	Pld	W	L	R	CP	TP
1	Makharbek Khadartsev (EUN)	4	4	0	X (Note: Classification points: EUN 6, USA 3, CUB 2)	12	27
2	Chris Campbell (USA)	4	3	1	X	10	24
3	Roberto Limonta (CUB)	5	3	2	X	11	24
4	Renato Lombardo (ITA)	4	2	2	4	7	4
5	Ludwig Schneider (GER)	4	1	3	4	4	3
—	Akira Ota (JPN)	3	1	2	3	4	3
—	Jozef Palatinus (TCH)	2	0	2	3	0	0
—	Gregory Edgelow (CAN)	2	0	2	2	1	1
—	Grant Parker (NZL)	2	0	2	2	0	0

Source: Official Report

=== Elimination B ===
==== Round 1 ====
	Score		CP
Iraklis Deskoulidis (GRE)	8–2	Kaloyan Baev (BUL)	3–1 PP
Ayoub Baninosrat (IRI)	0–1	Puntsagiin Sükhbat (MGL)	0–3 PO
Daniel Sánchez (PUR)	1–16	Marek Garmulewicz (POL)	0–4 ST
Kenan Şimşek (TUR)	6–0	Gábor Tóth (HUN)	3–0 PO

==== Round 2 ====
	Score		CP
Iraklis Deskoulidis (GRE)	0–4	Ayoub Baninosrat (IRI)	0–3 PO
Kaloyan Baev (BUL)	1–8	Puntsagiin Sükhbat (MGL)	1–3 PP
Daniel Sánchez (PUR)	0–4	Kenan Şimşek (TUR)	0–3 PO
Marek Garmulewicz (POL)	4–5	Gábor Tóth (HUN)	1–3 PP

==== Round 3 ====
	Score		CP
Iraklis Deskoulidis (GRE)	0–2	Puntsagiin Sükhbat (MGL)	0–3 PO
Ayoub Baninosrat (IRI)	4–0	Gábor Tóth (HUN)	3–0 PO
Marek Garmulewicz (POL)	1–4	Kenan Şimşek (TUR)	1–3 PP

==== Round 4 ====
	Score		CP
Ayoub Baninosrat (IRI)	0–4	Kenan Şimşek (TUR)	0–3 PO
Puntsagiin Sükhbat (MGL)		Bye	

==== Round 5 ====
	Score		CP
Puntsagiin Sükhbat (MGL)	2–3	Kenan Şimşek (TUR)	1–3 PP
Ayoub Baninosrat (IRI)		Bye	

==== Summary ====
Pos	Athlete	Pld	W	L	R	CP	TP
1	Kenan Şimşek (TUR)	5	5	0	X (Note: Classification points: TUR 6, MGL 4, IRI 1)	15	21
2	Puntsagiin Sükhbat (MGL)	4	3	1	X	10	13
3	Ayoub Baninosrat (IRI)	4	2	2	X	6	8
4	Marek Garmulewicz (POL)	3	1	2	3	6	21
5	Iraklis Deskoulidis (GRE)	3	1	2	3	3	8
—	Gábor Tóth (HUN)	3	1	2	3	3	5
—	Kaloyan Baev (BUL)	2	0	2	2	2	3
—	Daniel Sánchez (PUR)	2	0	2	2	0	1

Source: Official Report

=== Finals ===
	Score		CP
9th place match
Ludwig Schneider (GER)	0–3	Iraklis Deskoulidis (GRE)	0–3 PO
7th place match
Renato Lombardo (ITA)	0–0	Marek Garmulewicz (POL)	0–0 DO
5th place match
Roberto Limonta (CUB)	1–3	Ayoub Baninosrat (IRI)	1–3 PP
Bronze medal match
Chris Campbell (USA)	3–1	Puntsagiin Sükhbat (MGL)	3–1 PP
Gold medal match
Makharbek Khadartsev (EUN)	1–0	Kenan Şimşek (TUR)	3–0 PO

== Final standing ==
Rank	Athlete
1st place, gold medalist(s)	Makharbek Khadartsev (EUN)
2nd place, silver medalist(s)	Kenan Şimşek (TUR)
3rd place, bronze medalist(s)	Chris Campbell (USA)
4	Puntsagiin Sükhbat (MGL)
5	Ayoub Baninosrat (IRI)
6	Roberto Limonta (CUB)
7	Marek Garmulewicz (POL)
8	Renato Lombardo (ITA)
9	Iraklis Deskoulidis (GRE)
10	Ludwig Schneider (GER)
