= Evan Bernstein (wrestler) =

Israeli-American former Olympic wrestler

Evan Bernstein אבן ברנשטיין
Personal information
- Born: April 16, 1960 (age 66)
- Height: 6 ft 3.5 in (192 cm)
- Weight: 205 lb (93 kg)

Sport
- Style: Greco-Roman
- College team: Richland College; University of Minnesota

Evan Bernstein (Hebrew: אבן ברנשטיין; born April 16, 1960) is an Israeli-American former Olympic wrestler for Israel.

== Personal life ==
Bernstein was born in the United States to Stanley and Jacqueline Bernstein, and is Jewish. He graduated from Richardson High School in 1978. He then wrestled for Richland College, in Dallas, Texas, and for the University of Minnesota (graduating in 1984).

He moved from the United States to Israel in 1984, and served in the Israel Defense Forces. He then moved to North Texas in the United States with his family in 1999, and now lives in Allen, Texas.

His wife is Ora Bernstein. His sons Ophir and Eden are also wrestlers. Bernstein also has a daughter, Hadar.

== Wrestling career ==
Bernstein was 6 feet 3.5 inches (192 cm) tall and weighed 205 lb (93 kg) when he competed in the Olympics.

He competed in wrestling in the 1981 Maccabiah Games (for the US), and in the 1985 Maccabiah Games (for Israel). At the 1985 World Wrestling Championships in Norway Bernstein placed 8th, and at the 1986 World Wrestling Championships in Hungary he placed 7th.

Bernstein competed for Israel at the 1988 Summer Olympics in Seoul at the age of 28 in Men's Greco-Roman Wrestling in the Light-Heavyweight (90 kg) category. Bernstein beat Kamal Ibrahim of Egypt in the first round by decision, lost to Jean-Francois Court of France in the second round by passivity, received a bye in the next round, and lost to Franz Pitschmann of Austria in the fourth round by passivity.
