= 1987 World Wrestling Championships =

Men
- Host city: Clermont-Ferrand, France
- Dates: 19–29 August 1987

Women
- Host city: Lørenskog, Norway
- Dates: 24–25 October 1987

Champions
- Freestyle: Soviet Union
- Greco-Roman: Soviet Union
- Women: Norway

The following is the final results of the 1987 World Wrestling Championships. Men's Competition were held in Clermont-Ferrand, France and Women's Competition were held in Lørenskog, Norway.

== Medal table ==
Rank	Nation	Gold	Silver	Bronze	Total
1	Soviet Union	11	2	5	18
2	France	6	1	1	8
3	Norway	3	2	4	9
4	United States	2	4	3	9
5	Bulgaria	2	1	2	5
6	Hungary	1	1	0	2
6	North Korea	1	1	0	2
8	Finland	1	0	1	2
9	Belgium	1	0	0	1
9	Cuba	1	0	0	1
11	Japan	0	4	6	10
12	Poland	0	2	2	4
13	West Germany	0	2	0	2
14	Denmark	0	1	1	2
14	East Germany	0	1	1	2
14	Romania	0	1	1	2
17	Greece	0	1	0	1
17	Italy	0	1	0	1
17	Netherlands	0	1	0	1
17	South Korea	0	1	0	1
17	Sweden	0	1	0	1
17	Yugoslavia	0	1	0	1
23	Turkey	0	0	1	1
Totals (23 entries)		29	29	28	86

== Team ranking ==
Rank	Men's freestyle		Men's Greco-Roman		Women's freestyle	
Rank	Team	Points	Team	Points	Team	Points
1	Soviet Union	52	Soviet Union	47	Norway	39
2	United States	41	Bulgaria	23	France	34
3	Bulgaria	18	Poland	21	Japan	34
4	North Korea	13	Finland	19	Denmark	12
5	South Korea	12	Romania	13	Sweden	10
6	Japan	11	Hungary	11	Belgium	8

== Medal summary ==
=== Men's freestyle ===
Event	Gold	Silver	Bronze
48 kg	Ri Jae-sik; North Korea	Lee Sang-ho; South Korea	Sergey Karamchakov; Soviet Union
52 kg	Valentin Yordanov; Bulgaria	Kim Yong-sik; North Korea	Mitsuru Sato; Japan
57 kg	Sergey Beloglazov; Soviet Union	Barry Davis; United States	Ahmet Ak; Turkey
62 kg	John Smith; United States	Khazar Isayev; Soviet Union	Kazuhito Sakae; Japan
68 kg	Arsen Fadzaev; Soviet Union	Georgios Athanasiadis; Greece	Andre Metzger; United States
74 kg	Adlan Varaev; Soviet Union	Dave Schultz; United States	Uwe Westendorf; East Germany
82 kg	Mark Schultz; United States	Aleksandar Nanev; Bulgaria	Vladimir Modosyan; Soviet Union
90 kg	Makharbek Khadartsev; Soviet Union	Jim Scherr; United States	Jerzy Nieć; Poland
100 kg	Leri Khabelov; Soviet Union	Vasile Pușcașu; Romania	Bill Scherr; United States
130 kg	Aslan Khadartsev; Soviet Union	Andreas Schröder; East Germany	Bruce Baumgartner; United States

=== Men's Greco-Roman ===
Event	Gold	Silver	Bronze
48 kg	Mahaddin Allahverdiyev; Soviet Union	Vincenzo Maenza; Italy	Lars Rønningen; Norway
52 kg	Pedro Roque; Cuba	Roman Kierpacz; Poland	Aleksandr Ignatenko; Soviet Union
57 kg	Patrice Mourier; France	Rıfat Yıldız; West Germany	Keijo Pehkonen; Finland
62 kg	Zhivko Vangelov; Bulgaria	Kamandar Madzhidov; Soviet Union	Shigeki Nishiguchi; Japan
68 kg	Aslaudin Abaev; Soviet Union	Nandor Sabo; Yugoslavia	Jerzy Kopański; Poland
74 kg	Jouko Salomäki; Finland	Józef Tracz; Poland	Daulet Turlykhanov; Soviet Union
82 kg	Tibor Komáromi; Hungary	Roger Gössner; West Germany	Sergey Nasevich; Soviet Union
90 kg	Vladimir Popov; Soviet Union	Sándor Major; Hungary	Atanas Komchev; Bulgaria
100 kg	Guram Gedekhauri; Soviet Union	Dennis Koslowski; United States	Vasile Andrei; Romania
130 kg	Igor Rostorotsky; Soviet Union	Tomas Johansson; Sweden	Rangel Gerovski; Bulgaria

=== Women's freestyle ===
Event	Gold	Silver	Bronze
44 kg	Brigitte Weigert; Belgium	Anne Johnsen; Norway	Shoko Yoshimura; Japan
47 kg	Anne Holten; Norway	Lynie van der Holst; Netherlands	Satomi Sugawara; Japan
50 kg	Anne Marie Halvorsen; Norway	Kyoko Fukuda; Japan	Martine Poupon; France
53 kg	Sylvie van Gucht; France	Line Johansen; Norway	Stine Johansen; Norway
57 kg	Isabelle Dourthe; France	Sylvie Maret; France	Silje Hauland; Norway
61 kg	Ine Barlie; Norway	Akiko Iijima; Japan	Pia Buchholtz; Denmark
65 kg	Brigitte Herlin; France	Dorthe Pedersen; Denmark	Kimie Hoshikawa; Japan
70 kg	Georgette Jean; France	Rika Iwama; Japan	Hege Reitan; Norway
75 kg	Patricia Rossignol; France	Miyako Shimizu; Japan	None awarded
