= 1988 Yasar Dogu Tournament =

Yasar Dogu 1988
- Host city: Istanbul, Turkey
- Dates: 5–6 March 1988

The Yasar Dogu Tournament 1988, was a wrestling event held in Istanbul, Turkey between 5 and 6 March 1988. This tournament was held as 16th.

This international tournament includes competition includes competition in men's freestyle wrestling. This ranking tournament was held in honor of the two time Olympic Champion, Yaşar Doğu.

== Medal table ==
Rank	Nation	Gold	Silver	Bronze	Total
1	Soviet Union	5	2	1	8
2	Turkey	2	3	4	9
3	Romania	2	2	0	4
4	United States	1	2	1	4
5	Poland	0	1	1	2
6	Italy	0	0	2	2
7	Hungary	0	0	1	1
Totals (7 entries)		10	10	10	30

== Medal overview ==
=== Men's freestyle ===
Event	Gold	Silver	Bronze
48 kg	Romica Rasovan; Romania	Paul Winderman; United States	Mustafa Öcal; Turkey
52 kg	Sergey Smal; Soviet Union	Nicu Hincu; Romania	Eddie Gibson; United States
57 kg	Ahmet Ak; Turkey	Danut-Dumitru Prefit; Romania	Metin Kaplan; Turkey
62 kg	Selman Kaygusuz; Turkey	Abdul Davudov; Soviet Union	Giovanni Schillaci; Italy
68 kg	Kh Mamaev; Soviet Union	Lee Rey Smith; Soviet Union	Atilla Podolski; Hungary
74 kg	Claudiu Tamaduianu; Romania	Greg Elinsky; United States	Burhan Sabancıoğlu; Turkey
82 kg	Aleksander Savko; Soviet Union	Necmi Gençalp; Turkey	Anorzes Radomski; Poland
90 kg	Abdurrahman; Soviet Union	Jerzy Niec; Poland	Renato Lombardo; Italy
100 kg	Dan Severn; United States	Baki Sudakap; Turkey	Necati Kaya; Turkey
130 kg	Alexei Medvedev; Soviet Union	Ayhan Taşkın; Turkey	Nikolay Latuckin; Soviet Union

== Participating nations ==
- Turkey
- Romania
- Soviet Union
- Poland
- Hungary
- Italy
- Cuba
- Iraq
- Egypt
- Yugoslavia
- United States
