= Bindel =

Bindel is a surname. It may refer to:

- Julie Bindel (born 1962), British feminist writer
- Paul Bindel (1894–1973), German painter

== See also ==
- Hubert Bindels (born 1958), Belgian former wrestler
- Bindle (disambiguation)
