= Kim Tae-woo =

- Hangul: 김태우
- RR: Gim Taeu
- MR: Kim T'aeu

Kim Tae-woo may refer to:

- Kim Tae-woo (singer) (born 1981), singer
- Kim Tae-woo (actor) (born 1971), actor
- Kim Tae-woo (wrestler) (born 1962), freestyle wrestler
- Kim Tae-woo (footballer) (born 1993), South Korean footballer
