= Nieć =

Nieć is a surname derived from an Old Polish word meaning "nephew". Notable people with the surname include:

- Magdalena Nieć, Polish actress
- Jerzy Nieć (born 1964), Polish wrestler
