= Gulldén =

Gulldén is a Swedish surname. Notable people with the surname include:

- Christer Gulldén (born 1960), Swedish wrestler
- Isabelle Gulldén (born 1989), Swedish handball player
