= Temiz =

Temiz is a surname. Notable people with the surname include:

- İsmail Temiz (born 1954), Turkish former wrestler
- Okay Temiz (born 1939), Turkish fusion jazz percussionist and drummer
- Muharrem Temiz (born 1962), Turkish musician and folklorist
