= Pedro Roque =

Cuban Greco-Roman wrestler

Pedro Roque Favier (13 March 1968 – 24 May 2015) was a Cuban Greco-Roman wrestler who was world champion in 1987.
