= Kenan Şimşek =

Turkish wrestler (born 1968)

Personal information
- Nationality: Turkish
- Born: January 1, 1968 (age 58) Ordu, Turkey
- Years active: 1984-
- Height: 1.80 m (5 ft 11 in)

Sport
- Sport: Freestyle wrestling
- Event: Light Heavyweight
- Club: Ankara Büyükşehir Belediyesi SK
- Coached by: Muhammed Oruç
Medal record
Representing Turkey
Men's Freestyle wrestling
Olympic Games
Silver medal – second place	1992 Barcelona	90kg
European Championships
Bronze medal – third place	1993 Istanbul	90kg
Bronze medal – third place	1992 Kaposvar	90kg
Bronze medal – third place	1990 Poznań	90kg
Mediterranean Games
Gold medal – first place	1991 Athens	90kg

Kenan Şimşek (born 1968 in Ordu, Turkey) is a Turkish former Olympian wrestler competing in the 90 kg division of freestyle. He was a member of the club Ankara Büyükşehir Belediyesi SK.

Born 1968 in Ordu, northern Turkey, Kenan Şimşek began his wrestling career at Samsun in 1984.

== Achievements ==
He was Olympic silver medalist in Freestyle wrestling in 1992. He placed sixth at the 1990 and 1991 World Wrestling Championships.

Şimşek is the holder of three bronze medals won at the European Wrestling Championships in Poznań, Poland (1990), Kaposvar, Hungary (1992) and Istanbul, Turkey (1993).

He captured the gold medal at the 1991 Mediterranean Games held in Athens, Greece.

== Oil wrestling ==
Kenan Şimşek performed also Turkish traditional sport of oil wrestling (Turkish: yağlı güreş). He participated at the prestigious Kırkpınar oil wrestling competitions held every year in Edirne.

After three times becoming the third ranked in 1996, 1998 and 2001, he won the "Başpehlivan" (literally: Master wrestler) title at the 642th edition of Kırkpınar in 2003. In 2005, he became again "Başpehlivan" at the 5th Golden Hazelnut Festival held in Çatalpınar, Ordu.

He repeated his "Master wrestler" title gain at the 16th Kumru Düzova Oil Wrestling Competition at his hometown in 2008, which he had won already in 2001.

In 2010, Şimşek took the "Başpehlivan" title of the Hıdırellez Festival held in Sakarlı village of Terme in Samsun.
