= Jozef Palatinus =

Slovak wrestler

Personal information
- Nationality: Slovak
- Born: 8 August 1969 (age 56) Nová Baňa, Czechoslovakia

Sport
- Sport: Wrestling

Jozef Palatinus (born 8 August 1969) is a Slovak wrestler. He competed in the men's freestyle 90 kg at the 1992 Summer Olympics.
