= Dacian fortress of Zetea =

- Location within Romania
- 46.4347°N 25.3659°E
- Location: Desag Hill, Zetea, Harghita, Romania

Site notes
- Condition: Ruined

It was a small Dacian fortress surrounded by moat and wall enclosing three terraces. It was dated between 1st century BC and 1st century AD.
