= Bernard Ban =

Croatian wrestler (born 1961)

Personal information
- Nationality: Croatian
- Born: 8 March 1961 (age 65) Zagreb, Yugoslavia

Sport
- Sport: Wrestling

Bernard Ban (born 8 March 1961) is a Croatian wrestler. He competed in the men's Greco-Roman 90 kg at the 1988 Summer Olympics.
