= Christian Iloanusi =

Nigerian wrestler

Personal information
- Nationality: Nigerian
- Born: 3 November 1969 (age 56)

Sport
- Sport: Wrestling

Christian Iloanusi (born 3 November 1969) is a Nigerian wrestler. He competed in the men's freestyle 90 kg at the 1988 Summer Olympics.
