= Anne Marie Halvorsen =

Norwegian sport wrestler

Personal information
- Nationality: Norwegian
- Born: 12 August 1967 (age 58)

Sport
- Country: Norway
- Sport: Wrestling
Medal record
Women's freestyle wrestling
Representing Norway
World Championships
| Gold medal – first place | 1987 Lørenskog | 50 kg |

Anne Marie Halvorsen (born 12 August 1967) is a Norwegian sport wrestler. She became world champion in 1987, and was silver medalist at the European championships in 1988.

== Life and career ==
Halvorsen was born on 12 August 1967.

She won a gold medal at the 1987 World Wrestling Championships, and won a silver medal at the 1988 European Wrestling Championships.

She represented the clubs Langhus IL and Kolbotn IL, and won two national titles during her active career.
