= Vladimir Popov (wrestler) =

Russian wrestler (1962–2025)

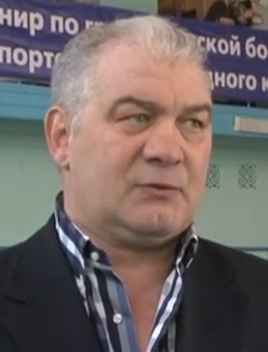
- Popov in 2014

Personal information
- Nationality: Russian
- Born: 1 January 1962 Barnaul, Altai Krai, Soviet Union
- Died: 2 August 2025 (aged 63) Omsk, Russia
- Education: Omsk State Institute of Physical Education
- Height: 185 cm (73 in)
- Weight: 90 kg (200 lb)

Sport
- Sport: Greco-Roman wrestling
- Weight class: Light-heavyweight
- Club: VS Omsk
Medal record
Men's Greco-Roman wrestling
Representing the Soviet Union
Olympic Games
Bronze medal – third place	1988 Seoul	90 kg
World Championships
Gold medal – first place	1987 Clermont-Ferrand	90 kg

Vladimir Albertovich Popov (Russian: Владимир Альбертович Попов; 1 January 1962 – 2 August 2025) was a Russian wrestler. He began wrestling in 1973 and was a silver medalist at the Soviet national championships in 1984 and 1985. He then won a title at the Wrestling World Cup in 1986 before winning gold at the national championships, European Championships and World Championships in 1987. He later won a bronze medal at the 1988 Summer Olympics and gold at the 1989 European Championships before retiring in 1990 and becoming a coach.

== Biography ==
Popov was born on 1 January 1962 in Barnaul, Altai Krai, Soviet Union. He grew up a fan of wrestling and had his mother enroll him for instruction at the club DSO "Trud" in 1973, when he was age 11. There, he trained under coach Valentin Permyakov, an Honored Coach of the USSR. He entered Suvorov Military School in ninth grade and after tenth grade moved to Omsk, where he attended the Omsk State Institute of Physical Education and later graduated. In Omsk, he became a member of the wrestling club VS Omsk.

Competing in Greco-Roman wrestling as a light-heavyweight, Popov received further training from coach Alexander Kiselnikov and was a silver medalist at the national championships in 1984 and 1985. He was selected to the Soviet national wrestling team for the first time in 1986. That year, he competed at the Wrestling World Cup and won the gold medal in his event. In 1987, he won the USSR Championship in Omsk, which he later described as "my first real victory [which] confirmed for me when that I could really be a champion". With his victory at the national championships, he qualified for the European Championships in Tampere, Finland, which he won without allowing a single point to be scored against him. He thus qualified for the 1987 World Wrestling Championships in Clermont-Ferrand, France, where he won gold and became world champion. For his accomplishments in 1987, he was given the title that year of Honored Master of Sports of the USSR.

In 1988, Popov repeated as Soviet champion in his event and was selected to compete at the 1988 Summer Olympics in Seoul, South Korea. Although he lost to Harri Koskela in the third round, he won his next four matches, pinning Christer Gulldén in the finals to earn the bronze medal. He later recalled that he had been expected to win gold at the Olympics and his bronze was viewed by himself and teammates as a disappointment: "I cleanly put [Gulldén] down in 20 seconds and won the bronze medal. I took it in my hands after the presentation, went and put it in my pocket. I was sour, the medal did not make me happy. Many guys said then: 'It is better to be nobody than to be third.' At that time, there was no joy. But still, it is an Olympic medal. You understand this only years later. At least I got the bronze – and that is a great happiness. But then we regarded it as a failure." The following year, he won his second title in his event at the European Championships. Popov retired from wrestling in 1990.

After concluding his competitive career, Popov served as a coach in Sweden, later moving to Australia. He is an inductee to the Omsk Wrestling Hall of Fame. He married his wife, Lena, in 1986. Their son, Ivan, competed for Australia and won a gold medal at the 2010 Commonwealth Games.

Popov died on 2 August 2025, at the age of 63, in Omsk.
