= Bakary Sanneh =

Gambian wrestler

Personal information
- Nationality: Gambian
- Born: 18 July 1959 (age 67)

Sport
- Sport: Wrestling

Bakary Sanneh (born 18 July 1959) is a Gambian wrestler. He competed at the 1988 Summer Olympics in the men's freestyle 90 kg.
