= Reuben Tucker =

Guamanian wrestler

Personal information
- Nationality: Guamanian
- Born: 30 December 1956 (age 69)

Sport
- Sport: Wrestling

Reuben Tucker (born 30 December 1956) is a wrestler from Guam. He competed in the men's freestyle 90 kg at the 1988 Summer Olympics.
