= Ahmad Al-Shami =

Syrian wrestler (born 1965)

Personal information
- Nationality: Syrian
- Born: 10 October 1965 (age 60)

Sport
- Sport: Wrestling

Ahmad Al-Shami (Arabic: أحمد الشامي; born 10 October 1965) is a Syrian wrestler. He had competed in the men's freestyle 90 kg at the 1988 Summer Olympics.
