= Rumen Alabakov =

Bulgarian wrestler

Personal information
- Nationality: Bulgarian
- Born: 2 August 1965 (age 60) Asenovgrad, Bulgaria

Sport
- Sport: Wrestling

Rumen Alabakov (born 2 August 1965) is a Bulgarian wrestler. He competed in the men's freestyle 90 kg at the 1988 Summer Olympics.
