= Roberto Leitão =

Brazilian martial artist (1937–2020)

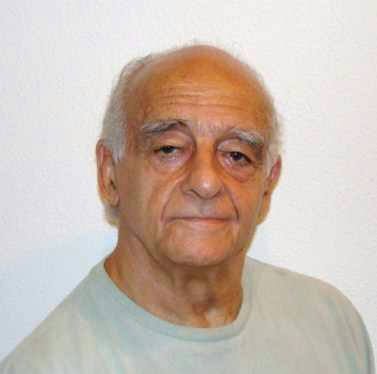
- Born: Roberto Cláudio das Neves Leitão; May 15, 1937; Santa Catarina, Brazil
- Died: November 28, 2020 (aged 83); Rio de Janeiro, Brazil
- Style: Luta Livre; Judo
- Rank: 10th degree black belt in Luta Livre; 4th degree black belt in Judo

Other information
- University: Pontifical Catholic University of Rio de Janeiro
- Children: Roberto Neves Filho

Roberto Cláudio das Neves Leitão (15 May 1937 – 28 November 2020) was a Brazilian martial artist in Luta Livre, or Brazilian Catch Wrestling. Father of Roberto Neves Filho. He was a 4th degree blackbelt in Judo, while also having 60 years in Luta Livre. He dedicated himself to flawless technique.

== Biography ==
He held a degree in mechanical engineering. He was university professor who continuously wrote about martial arts and grappling. He would lead the way for Luta Livre during the 1970s.

Roberto trained a number of grapplers including Renato Sobral, Pedro Rizzo and Marco Ruas. Additionally he is said to be an instructor of José Aldo. He would also train with 1984 Greco Roman Superheavyweight Gold medalist, Jeff Blatnick for Blatnick's run in MMA. Roberto was the coach of Renato Babalu, whom he coached to a submission over Ilioukhine Mikhail. His son would serve as the superintendent of the Brazilian Confederation of Associated Wrestling and was an athlete at the Olympic Games at Seoul 1988 and Barcelona 1992.

He died from COVID-19 in Rio de Janeiro on 11 November 2020.
