= Bindle (disambiguation) =

A bindle is a small sack for personal belongings.

Bindle may also refer to:

- Bindle (One of Them Days), 1966 British comedy film
- Kelly Bindle, Canadian provincial politician from 2016 to 2019

== See also ==
- Bindel (disambiguation)
