= Jai Prakash (wrestler) =

Indian wrestler (born 1958)

Personal information
- Nationality: Indian
- Born: 1 January 1958 (age 68)

Sport
- Sport: Wrestling

Jai Prakash (born 1 January 1958) is an Indian wrestler. He competed in the men's freestyle 90 kg at the 1984 Summer Olympics.
