= Hege Reitan =

Norwegian sport wrestler

Personal information
- Nationality: Norwegian
- Born: 15 November 1970 (age 55) Kristiansund, Norway

Sport
- Country: Norway
- Sport: Wrestling
- Club: IL Braatt
Medal record
Women's freestyle wrestling
Representing Norway
World Championships
Bronze medal – third place	1987 Lørenskog	70 kg

Hege Reitan (born 15 September 1970) is a Norwegian sport wrestler. Her achievements include a bronze medal at the world championships and twice national champion.

== Career ==
Reitan became Norwegian champion in 1987 and 1988.

She won a bronze medal at the 1987 World Wrestling Championships in Lørenskog Municipality.

== Personal life ==
Reitan was born in Kristiansund on 15 September 1970.
