= Steve Fraser =

American wrestler (born 1958)

Personal information
- Full name: Steven Howard Fraser
- Born: March 23, 1958 (age 68) Hazel Park, Michigan, U.S.

Sport
- Country: United States
- Sport: Wrestling
- Weight class: 90 kg
- Events: Greco-Roman and Folkstyle
- College team: Michigan
- Club: Michigan Wrestling Club
- Team: USA
- Coached by: Ronald Finley
Medal record
Men's Greco-Roman wrestling
Representing the United States
Olympic Games
Gold medal – first place	1984 Los Angeles	90 kg
Pan American Games
Gold medal – first place	1983 Caracas	90 kg

Steven Howard "Steve" Fraser (born March 23, 1958) is an American Greco-Roman wrestler and coach. He was the 1984 Olympic Games gold medalist in Greco-Roman wrestling, in the 90 kg weight class. Fraser's gold medal was the first ever for the United States in Greco-Roman wrestling.

== Early life and education ==
A native of Hazel Park, Michigan, Fraser was a Michigan High School Athletic Association (MHSAA) state wrestling champion. In college he was a two-time All-American wrestler, wrestling at the University of Michigan.

== Greco-Roman wrestling career ==
In 1984, Fraser's gold medal was the first ever Olympic gold in Greco-Roman wrestling for the United States. The next night following Fraser's gold medal performance, Jeff Blatnick won a second gold medal for the United States Greco-Roman Olympic team. Fraser served as coach of the United States Greco Roman team from 1997 to 2014.

Rulon Gardner who was a gold medalist at the 2000 Olympic Games, credits Fraser's instruction as a large part of his wrestling success. The year Fraser competed at the Olympics in 1984, the United States won 9 gold medals in Greco-Roman and freestyle wrestling, the most at a single Olympics in American wrestling history.

== Honors ==
Fraser was inducted into the National Wrestling Hall of Fame as a Distinguished Member in 1994 and the Michigan Sports Hall of Fame in 2008.
