= Vărșag (river) =

- Location within Romania

Location
- Country: Romania
- Counties: Harghita County
- Villages: Vărșag

Physical characteristics
- Mouth: Târnava Mare
  - location: Poiana Târnavei
  - coordinates: 46.4975°N 25.3536°E
- Length: 12 km (7.5 mi)
- Basin size: 34 km^{2} (13 sq mi)

Basin features
- Progression: Târnava Mare→ Târnava→ Mureș→ Tisza→ Danube→ Black Sea
- Tributaries
  - left: Fântâna Mare

The Vărșag is a left tributary of the river Târnava Mare, in Romania. It flows into the Târnava Mare near the village Poiana Târnavei. Its length is 12 km (7.5 mi) and its basin size is 34 km^{2} (13 sq mi).
