= Macauley Appah =

Nigerian wrestler

Personal information
- Nationality: Nigerian
- Born: 1 August 1960 (age 65)

Sport
- Sport: Wrestling

Macauley Appah (born 1 October 1960) is a Nigerian wrestler. He competed in the men's freestyle 90 kg at the 1984 Summer Olympics.
