= Dallas College Richland =

Community college in Dallas, Texas, U.S.

Dallas College Richland Campus
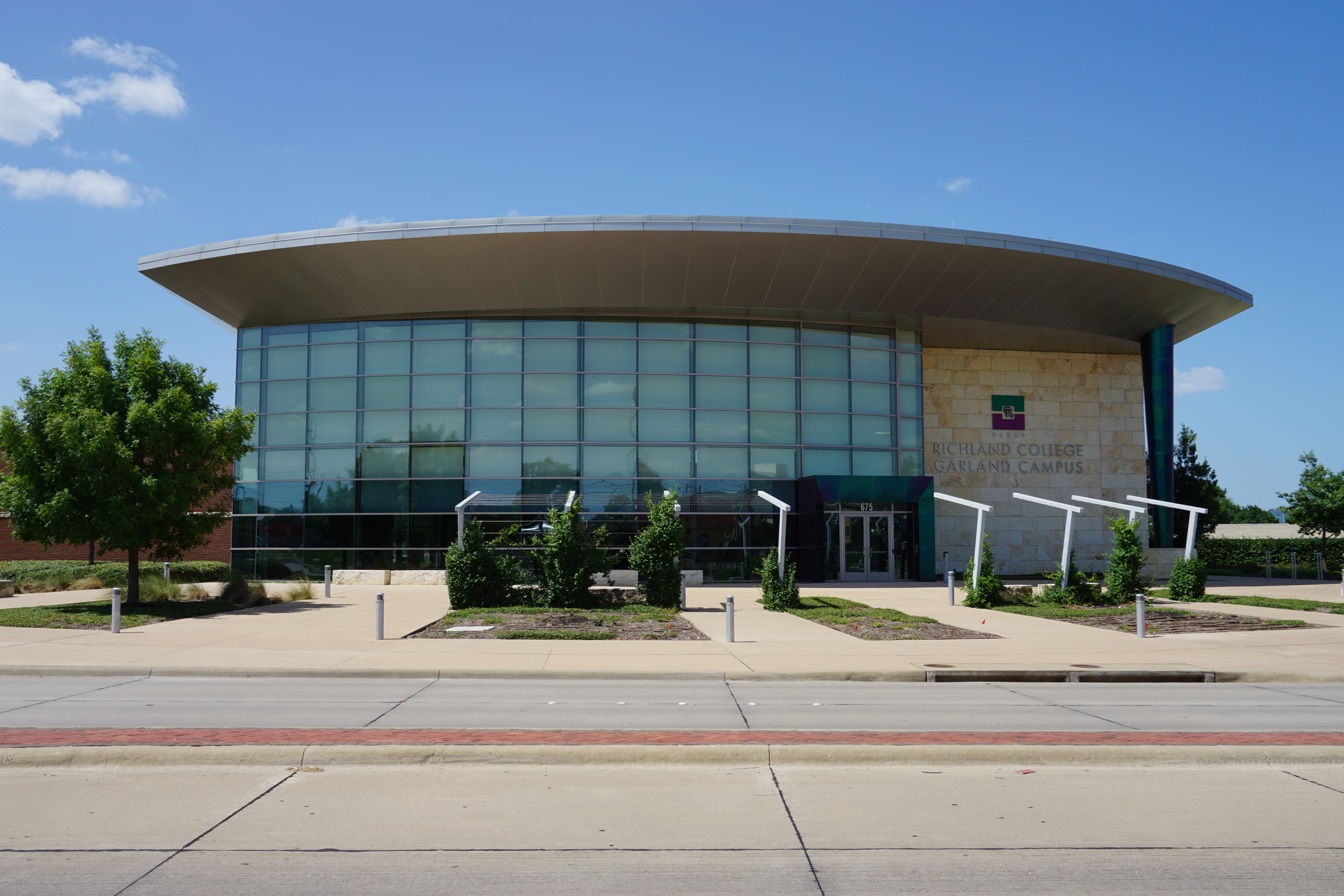
- View of Richland Campus Garland Campus
- Motto: Teaching, Learning, Community Building
- Type: Public community college
- Established: 1972
- Parent institution: Dallas College
- Chancellor: Justin H. Lonon
- President: Kay Eggleston
- Students: 20,000
- Location: Dallas, Texas, United States; 32°55′17″N 96°44′06″W
- Campus: Urban, 155 acres (0.63 km2)
- Colors: Purple and Green
- Mascot: Thunderduck
- Website: dallascollege.edu

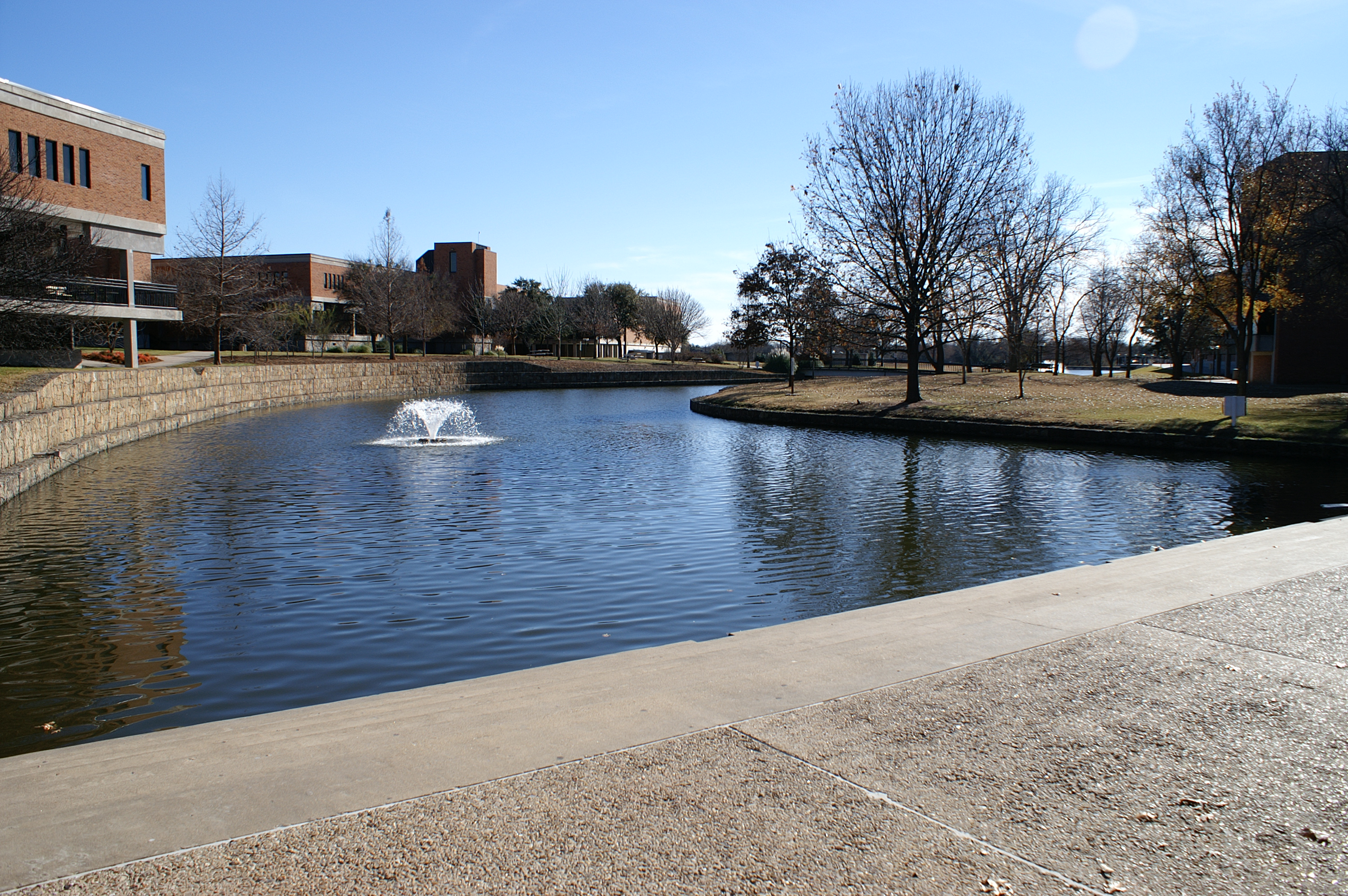
View of Thunderduck Lake from outside Richland Campus student lounge

Dallas College Richland Campus (often stylized as Richland or RLC) is a public community college in Dallas, Texas. The school was founded in 1972 and is part of Dallas College. It is the largest campus in the college, featuring about 20,000 students. Located on the old Jackson farm, the campus comprises 155 acres (63 hectares) including Thunderduck Lake.

== Awards and recognition ==
In 2005, the Richland Campus became the first community college to receive the Malcolm Baldrige National Quality Award.

It has been designated as the first two-year institution in Texas as a National Center of Academic Excellence in Information Assurance Education (CAE2Y) for academic years 2011-2016. CAE2Ys receive formal recognition from the U.S. government, as well as opportunities for prestige and publicity for their role in securing our nation’s information systems.

In 2013, Dallas College Richland Campus developed a skill standard for Digital Forensic Technician. Its Cyber Security program was recognized by the Texas Skills Standard Board (TSSB) as the first and only institution in Texas to meet this statewide standard.

== Athletics ==
Dallas College Richland Campus fields teams in basketball, baseball, wrestling, soccer, and volleyball that compete in the Dallas-area Dallas Athletic Conference. They also compete for national championships within the National Junior College Athletic Association, Division III. Many athletes have gone on to play for four-year university programs and professional teams.

The men's basketball team won the NJCAA Division III championship in 1999, 2009, and 2015.

The baseball team won the NJCAA Division III World Series championship in 2002, 2003, 2004, and 2009.

The men's soccer team won the NJCAA Division III championship in 2002, 2003, 2004, 2006, 2007, 2016, 2018 2019, 2020, 2021, 2022, and 2023.

The women's soccer team won the NJCAA Division III championship in 2004, 2006, 2009, and 2018.

=== Wrestling ===
From 1972-1984, Richland won 7 out of 8 Texas state wrestling championships while competing against four-year universities with wrestlers on scholarships. In 1984, all Texas colleges dropped wrestling, and the team was forced to travel as far as Kansas every weekend for meets. The lack of local competition and extensive travel caused Richland to shut down their program in 1987. The program was resurrected in 2016, competing in the NCWA Southwest Conference.

Coach Bill Neal was named NCWA Coach of the Year in 2017 and 2018. Coach Neal retired in 2020 after 48 years at Richland.

COVID-19 and other concerns, including the sport having club status rather than falling under the NJCAA, caused the college to cancel the program shortly after Coach Neal’s retirement.

== Building names ==
Some buildings at Dallas College Richland Campus are named for heroes of the Texas Revolution, with the first letter of the name corresponding to the use of the building. For example, Bonham Hall, where the Business department is located, is named for James Butler Bonham, who died at the 1836 Battle of the Alamo. Crockett Hall, named for Alamo hero David Crockett, is the Campus Center. Fannin Hall, where Fine Art classes are held, is named for Col. James W. Fannin, who led the ill-fated Texas rebels at Goliad.

Other building names are Spanish words or names. Lavaca ("the cow") Hall houses the Library. Alamito ("little cottonwood") Hall is the original Administration Building. El Paso ("the Pass") Hall is the interior lower level of a bridge that connects the east and west sides of the campus, which are separated by a shallow but picturesque creek originally known as Jackson Branch. Del Rio ("of the river") Hall is where the school's data center or computer lab is located.

Sabine Hall, named for the river that separates Texas and Louisiana, is the Science Building. Neches and Pecos Halls are also named for rivers. The previous Science building is now called Wichita Hall, which is named after a Texas Indian tribe. Thunderduck Hall, named after the school athletic team cartoon mascot, is the new Administration Building.

== Notable alumni ==
- Evan Bernstein, Israeli Olympic wrestler
- Tony Bishop, Panamanian professional basketball player
- Adrián Jusino, Bolivian professional soccer player
- Greg Travis, comedian and actor
