= Zetea =

Zetea Zetelaka
- Commune
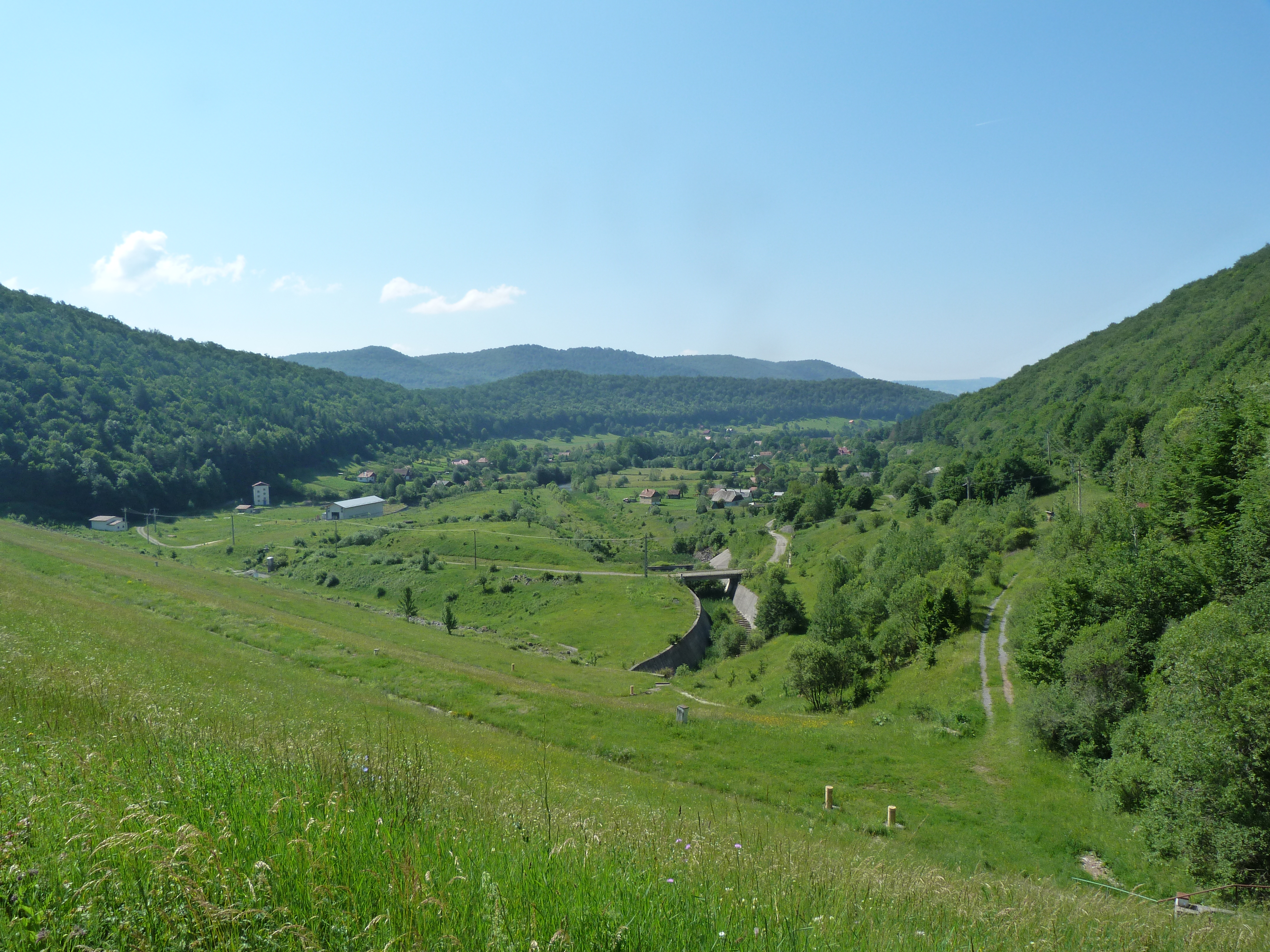
- Panoramic view of Zetea

- Coat of arms

- Location in Harghita County

- Location in Romania
- Coordinates: 46°23′N 25°22′E
- Country: Romania
- County: Harghita

Government
  - Mayor (2020–2024): Attila Nagy (UDMR)
- Area: 206.76 km^{2} (79.83 sq mi)
- Elevation: 529 m (1,736 ft)
- Population (2021-12-01): 5,729
  - Density: 27.71/km^{2} (71.76/sq mi)
- Time zone: UTC+02:00 (EET)
  - Summer (DST): UTC+03:00 (EEST)
- Postal code: 537360
- Area code: +(40) 266
- Vehicle reg.: HR
- Website: zetelaka.ro

Zetea (Hungarian: Zetelaka, Hungarian pronunciation: [ˈzɛtɛlɒkɒ]) is a commune in the central part of Harghita County, Romania. The commune lies in the Székely Land, an ethno-cultural region in eastern Transylvania. It is composed of six villages: Desag (Desághátja), Poiana Târnavei (Küküllőmező), Izvoare (Ivómezeje, Ivó), Sub Cetate (Zeteváralja), Șicasău (Sikaszó), and Zetea.

== Geography ==
Zetea is located 12.4 km (7.7 mi) north of Odorheiu Secuiesc and 52.3 km (32.5 mi) west of the county seat, Miercurea Ciuc.

The commune lies on the banks of the Târnava Mare river. The Vărșag is a left tributary of this river; it flows into the Târnava Mare near the Poiana Târnavei village.

== Demographics ==
Historical population
Year	Pop.	±%
1850	2,333	—
1930	4,714	+102.1%
1977	6,138	+30.2%
2002	5,753	−6.3%
2011	5,643	−1.9%
2021	5,729	+1.5%
Source: Census data

The commune has an absolute Székely Hungarian majority. According to the 2011 census, it had a population of 5,643 of which 96.72% or 5,721 were ethnic Hungarians and 1.19% were ethnic Romani. At the 2021 census, Zetea had 5,643 inhabitants, of which 95.36% were Hungarians.

== Natives ==
- Fortunát Boros (1895–1953), Franciscan friar, writer, victim of the Communist regime
- Ludwig Schneider (b. 1968), German wrestler

== See also ==
- Dacian fortress of Zetea
