= Ludwig Schneider (wrestler) =

German wrestler

Personal information
- Nationality: German
- Born: 19 September 1968 (age 57) Zetea, Romania

Sport
- Sport: Wrestling

Ludwig Schneider (born 19 September 1968) is a German wrestler. He competed in the men's freestyle 90 kg at the 1992 Summer Olympics.
