= Garry Kallos =

Canadian wrestler (born 1956)

Personal information
- Nationality: Canadian
- Born: 5 March 1956 (age 70) Budapest, Hungary
- Home town: Montreal, Canada
- Education: Concordia University (Bachelor of Applied Science '80)

Sport
- Country: Canada
- Sport: Wrestling, sambo
- Coached by: Victor Zilberman
Medal record
Pan American Games
Gold medal – first place	1983 Caracas	Sambo
Maccabiah Games
Gold medal – first place	1977 Israel	Wrestling
Gold medal – first place	1981 Israel	Wrestling
Gold medal – first place	1985 Israel	Wrestling

Garry Kallos (born 5 March 1956) is a Canadian former wrestler who competed in the 1984 Summer Olympics and won five gold medals at the Maccabiah Games in Israel, and sambo competitor who won a gold medal at the Pan American Games.

== Biography ==
Kallos was born in Budapest, Hungary, and resides in Montreal, Canada. His parents were Holocaust survivors.

He attended Concordia University (Bachelor of Applied Science '80). Kallos competed in the 95+ kilo weight class at the Canadian Interuniversity Athletic Union championships, where he won the gold medal in 1978 and 1984. He was named to the Concordia University Sports Hall of Fame in 2002.

From 1979 to 1981, he won Canada's national freestyle championship. In addition, from 1979 to 1983, he was national Greco-Roman champion.

He won a gold medal for Canada at 90 kg in Sambo at the 1983 Pan American Games in Caracas, Venezuela.

Kallos finished in 10th place in the light-heavyweight category in Men's Greco-Roman 90 kg at the 1984 Summer Olympics. He also qualified to represent Canada in the 1980 Summer Olympics in Moscow, in both Greco Roman and Freestyle.

Kallos is Jewish, and won five gold medals and a silver at the Maccabiah Games in Israel (1977 Maccabiah Games, 1981 Maccabiah Games (two gold medals), and 1985 Maccabiah Games). He was the Team Canada coach at the Maccabiah Games in 1993 and 1997.
