= Uwe Sachs =

German wrestler

Personal information
- Nationality: German
- Born: 5 April 1959 (age 67) Freiburg im Breisgau, Germany

Sport
- Sport: Wrestling

Uwe Sachs (born 5 April 1959) is a German wrestler. He competed in the men's Greco-Roman 90 kg at the 1984 Summer Olympics.
