= Stine Johansen =

Norwegian sport wrestler

Personal information
- Nationality: Norwegian

Sport
- Country: Norway
- Sport: Wrestling
Medal record
Women’s freestyle wrestling
Representing Norway
World Championships
Bronze medal – third place	1987 Lørenskog	53 kg

Stine Johansen is a Norwegian sport wrestler.

She won a bronze medal at the 1987 World Wrestling Championships in Lørenskog.
