= Grant Parker (wrestler) =

New Zealand wrestler

Personal information
- Nationality: New Zealand
- Born: 29 October 1960 (age 65) Carterton, New Zealand

Sport
- Sport: Wrestling

Grant Parker (born 29 October 1960) is a New Zealand wrestler. He competed in the men's freestyle 90 kg at the 1992 Summer Olympics.
