= Anne Johnsen =

Norwegian sport wrestler

Personal information
- Nationality: Norwegian

Sport
- Country: Norway
- Sport: Wrestling
Medal record
Women’s freestyle wrestling
Representing Norway
World Championships
Silver medal – second place	1987 Lørenskog	44 kg

Anne Therese Johnsen is a Norwegian sport wrestler.

== Biography ==
Johnsen won a silver medal at the 1987 World Wrestling Championships in Lørenskog.
