= Polish Sports Personality of the Year =

Polish newspaper annual sports award

- Przegląd Sportowy magazine logo
- Awarded for: Best Polish sportsperson deemed to have achieved the most in the previous year
- Country: Poland
- Presented by: Przegląd Sportowy
- First award: 1926
- Website: www.przegladsportowy.pl

The Polish Sports Personality of the Year (Polish: Plebiscyt Przeglądu Sportowego na najlepszego polskiego sportowca roku) is chosen annually since 1926 by the readers of the newspaper Przegląd Sportowy, which makes it the second oldest such contest in the world. The winner is the sportsperson, judged by a public vote, to have achieved the most in the previous year.

The first winner of the award was track and field athlete Wacław Kuchar. Between 1939 and 1947, the contest was not held due to the Second World War. The most successful athletes in the contest's history are footballer Robert Lewandowski and swimmer Otylia Jędrzejczak with three titles each; track and field athletes Irena Szewińska and Stanisława Walasiewicz, as well as ski jumper Adam Małysz with four titles each; while cross-country skier Justyna Kowalczyk is the current leader who holds five titles. Fencer Jerzy Pawłowski holds the record number of eleven appearances among the top 10 athletes. As of 2024, the award has been given to 59 male and 30 female athletes.

Apart from the main award, winners are announced in additional categories such as Super Champion Lifetime Achievement Award, Coach of the Year, Team of the Year, Sport Without Barriers Award for disabled athletes and Sporting Event of the Year.

== Polish Sports Personality of the Year ==
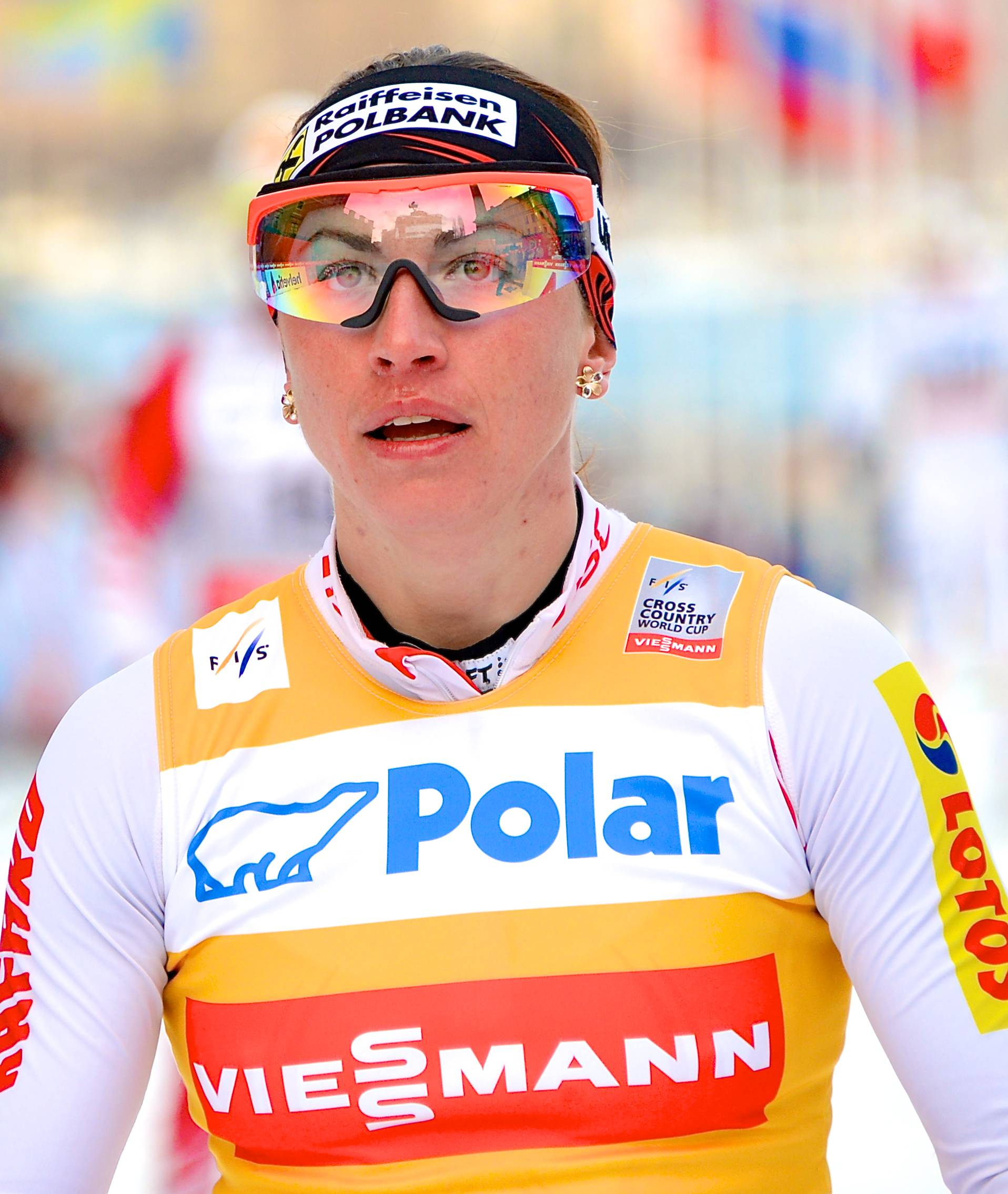
Justyna Kowalczyk, a five-time winner of the award, holds the record number of wins

POLISH SPORTSPERSONALITY OF THE YEAR
YEAR	ATHLETE	SPORT
1926	Wacław Kuchar	athletics football ice hockey
1927	Halina Konopacka	athletics
1928	Halina Konopacka	athletics
1929	Stanisław Petkiewicz	athletics
1930	Stanisława Walasiewicz	athletics
1931	Janusz Kusociński	athletics
1932	Stanisława Walasiewicz	athletics
1933	Stanisława Walasiewicz	athletics
1934	Stanisława Walasiewicz	athletics
1935	Roger Verey	rowing
1936	Jadwiga Jędrzejowska	tennis
1937	Jadwiga Jędrzejowska	tennis
1938	Stanisław Marusarz	ski jumping
1939–1947	not awarded due to World War II
1948	Aleksy Antkiewicz	boxing
1949	Zdobysław Stawczyk	athletics
1950	Helena Rakoczy	gymnastics
1951	Zygmunt Chychła	boxing
1952	Zygmunt Chychła	boxing
1953	Leszek Drogosz	boxing
1954	Janusz Sidło	athletics
1955	Janusz Sidło	athletics
1956	Elżbieta Krzesińska	athletics
1957	Jerzy Pawłowski	fencing
1958	Zdzisław Krzyszkowiak	athletics
1959	Edmund Piątkowski	athletics
1960	Jozef Schmidt	athletics
1961	Ireneusz Paliński	weightlifting
1962	Teresa Ciepły	athletics
1963	Ryszard Parulski	fencing
1964	Jozef Schmidt	athletics
1965	Irena Kirszenstein	athletics
1966	Irena Kirszenstein	athletics
1967	Sobiesław Zasada	auto racing
1968	Jerzy Pawłowski	fencing
1969	Waldemar Baszanowski	weightlifting
1970	Teresa Sukniewicz	athletics
1971	Ryszard Szurkowski	road cycling
1972	Witold Woyda	fencing
1973	Ryszard Szurkowski	road cycling
1974	Irena Szewińska	athletics
1975	Zygmunt Smalcerz	weightlifting
1976	Irena Szewińska	athletics
1977	Janusz Pyciak-Peciak	modern pentathlon
1978	Józef Łuszczek	cross-country skiing
1979	Jan Jankiewicz	road cycling
1980	Władysław Kozakiewicz	athletics
1981	Janusz Pyciak-Peciak	modern pentathlon
1982	Zbigniew Boniek	football (soccer)
1983	Zdzisław Hoffmann	athletics
1984	Andrzej Grubba	table tennis
1985	Lech Piasecki	road cycling
1986	Andrzej Malina	wrestling
1987	Marek Łbik and Marek Dopierała	canoeing
1988	Waldemar Legień	judo
1989	Joachim Halupczok	road cycling
1990	Wanda Panfil	athletics
1991	Wanda Panfil	athletics
1992	Waldemar Legień	judo
1993	Rafał Kubacki	judo
1994	Andrzej Wroński	wrestling
1995	Paweł Nastula	judo
1996	Renata Mauer	shooting
1997	Paweł Nastula	judo
1998	Robert Korzeniowski	athletics
1999	Tomasz Gollob	motorcycle speedway
2000	Robert Korzeniowski	athletics
2001	Adam Małysz	ski jumping
2002	Adam Małysz	ski jumping
2003	Adam Małysz	ski jumping
2004	Otylia Jędrzejczak	swimming
2005	Otylia Jędrzejczak	swimming
2006	Otylia Jędrzejczak	swimming
2007	Adam Małysz	ski jumping
2008	Robert Kubica	Formula One
2009	Justyna Kowalczyk	cross-country skiing
2010	Justyna Kowalczyk	cross-country skiing
2011	Justyna Kowalczyk	cross-country skiing
2012	Justyna Kowalczyk	cross-country skiing
2013	Justyna Kowalczyk	cross-country skiing
2014	Kamil Stoch	ski jumping
2015	Robert Lewandowski	football (soccer)
2016	Anita Włodarczyk	athletics
2017	Kamil Stoch	ski jumping
2018	Bartosz Kurek	volleyball
2019	Bartosz Zmarzlik	motorcycle speedway
2020	Robert Lewandowski	football (soccer)
2021	Robert Lewandowski	football (soccer)
2022	Iga Świątek	tennis
2023	Iga Świątek	tennis
2024	Aleksandra Mirosław	climbing
2025	Klaudia Zwolińska	canoe slalom

== Most successful sportspeople ==
Place	Name	1st place	2nd place	3rd place	Combined
1	Justyna Kowalczyk	5	0	0	5
2	Irena Szewińska	4	4	0	8
3	Stanisława Walasiewicz	4	0	4	8
4	Robert Lewandowski	3	3	1	7
5	Adam Małysz	4	0	2	6
6	Otylia Jędrzejczak	3	2	1	6
7	Janusz Sidło	2	4	1	7
8	Robert Korzeniowski	2	3	2	7
9	Kamil Stoch	2	2	1	5
10	Józef Szmidt	2	2	0	4

== Winners by sport ==
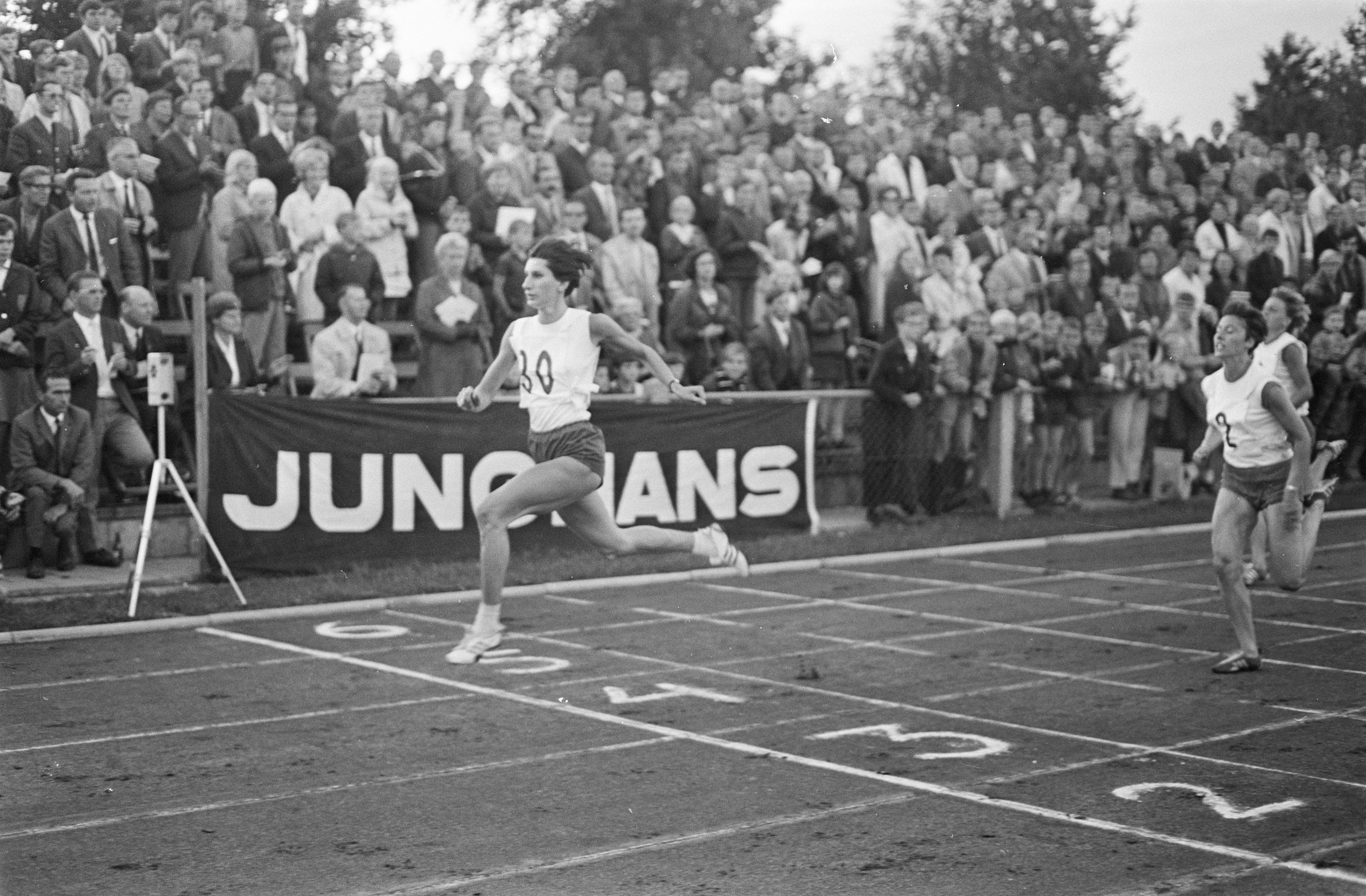
Irena Szewińska, a four-time winner of the award. With 30 winners, athletics is the most represented sport in the contest's history.

Sport	First place(s)
Athletics	30
Ski jumping	7
Cross-country skiing	6
Judo	5
Cycling	5
Football	5
Boxing	4
Fencing	4
Tennis	4
Swimming	3
Weightlifting	3
Modern pentathlon	2
Wrestling	2
Speedway	2
Gymnastics	1
Formula One	1
Kayaking	1
Rallying	1
Shooting	1
Rowing	1
Table tennis	1
Volleyball	1
Climbing	1
Canoe slalom	1

== See also ==
- Polish Footballer of the Year
- Sport in Poland
