= Karolj Kopas =

Yugoslav wrestler (born 1958)

Personal information
- Nationality: Yugoslav
- Born: 21 July 1958 (age 68)

Sport
- Sport: Wrestling

Karolj Kopas (born 21 July 1958) is a Yugoslav wrestler. He competed in the men's Greco-Roman 90 kg at the 1984 Summer Olympics. He won a gold medal at the 1983 Mediterranean Games.
