= Michele Azzola =

Italian wrestler

Personal information
- Nationality: Italian
- Born: 26 August 1954 (age 71) Gemona del Friuli, Italy

Sport
- Sport: Wrestling

Michele Azzola (born 26 August 1954) is an Italian wrestler. He competed in the men's freestyle 90 kg at the 1984 Summer Olympics.
