= Roberto Limonta =

Cuban wrestler (born 1962)

Personal information
- Born: January 6, 1962 (age 64)
Medal record
Men's freestyle wrestling
Representing Cuba
World Championships
Bronze medal – third place	1991 Varna	90 kg
Pan American Games
Gold medal – first place	1983 Caracas	90 kg
Gold medal – first place	1991 Havana	90 kg

Roberto Limonta Vargas (born January 6, 1962) is retired male wrestler from Cuba. He represented his native country at the 1992 Summer Olympics in Barcelona, Spain. He won a gold medal twice at the Pan American Games.
