= Frank Andersson =

Swedish wrestler (1956–2018)

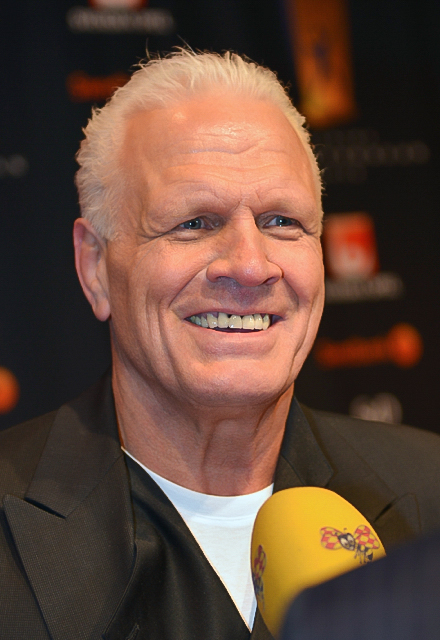
- Frank Andersson at the Swedish Sports Awards inside the Stockholm Globe Arena in Stockholm, Sweden in January 2014

Personal information
- Born: Frank Öivind Stefan Andersson; 9 May 1956 Trollhättan, Sweden
- Died: 9 September 2018 (aged 62) Solna, Sweden

Professional wrestling career
- Ring name: Frank Andersson
- Billed height: 185 cm (6 ft 1 in)
- Billed weight: 106 kg (234 lb; 16.7 st)
- Trained by: Brad Rheingans; WCW Power Plant
- Debut: 3 May 1991
- Retired: 2014

Frank Öivind Stefan Andersson (9 May 1956 – 9 September 2018) was a Swedish wrestler and entertainer. He started in wrestling, winning several world championship gold medals as well as a bronze medal at the 1984 Summer Olympics in Los Angeles. He later became a pro wrestler with mixed success. He was also a television personality appearing on several Swedish reality and game shows.

== Wrestling career ==
Medal record

Men's Greco-Roman wrestling

Representing Sweden

Olympic Games
Bronze medal – third place	1984 Los Angeles	90 kg

World Championships
Gold medal – first place	1977 Gothenburg	90 kg
Gold medal – first place	1979 San Diego	90 kg
Gold medal – first place	1982 Katowice	90 kg

Frank Andersson's wrestling career included gold medals at the 1973 and 1975 Junior World Championships and as he got older he wrestled at a number of Greco-Roman wrestling World Championships over the years. In 1977, 1979 and 1982 he won the gold medal in the 90 kg (200 lb; 14 st) division. He also took the silver medal in 1978 and 1981. The pinnacle of his amateur wrestling career came in 1984 at the 1984 Summer Olympics in Los Angeles where he won a bronze medal in the 90 kg weight division. In addition to his in ring achievements, Andersson was awarded the Svenska Dagbladet Gold Medal in 1977. He was inducted in the Amateur Wrestling Hall of Fame in 2006.

== Pro wrestling career ==
=== Beginnings ===
Andersson was trained for his pro wrestling career by Brad Rheingans, a former Olympian as well, and made his debut on 3 May 1991 for the American Wrestling Association, defeating Randy Thornton, who also debuted. Within months, he went to Japan, wrestling for New Japan Pro-Wrestling (NJPW).

=== New Japan Pro Wrestling (1991) ===
The rookie made his debut for New Japan Pro Wrestling on September 10, 1991 at the New Japan Battle Autumn 1991 - Tag 1 event in Osaka. Teaming with Brad Rheingans, the duo defeated Black Cat & Michiyoshi Ohara. Andersson had his first singles match two days later when he defeated Koji Kanemoto at an event in Tokushima. On September 23, he teamed with Masa Saito to defeat Hiro Saito & Ron Simmons. Andersson was undefeated in tag-team and singles matches during the tour, and would return in December for the New Japan Battle Final event. It was during this second tour where Andersson would sustain his only loss of the 1990s, when Black Cat & Flying Scorpio (2 Cold Scorpio defeated him & Koji Kanemoto. His last match of the tour came on December 14, 1991, when he teamed with Shinya Hashimoto to defeat Brad Rheingans & Masanobu Kurisu.

=== World Wrestling Federation (1993) ===
On April 8, 1993, he worked one night only for the WWE when he defeated Red Tyler in Paris, France at a European Tour show.

=== World Championship Wrestling (1994 - 1995) ===
In 1994, he signed with World Championship Wrestling (WCW), based in Atlanta. He made his debut March 8, 1994 at WCW's Battle Stars 1994 house show series, defeating Kole (the future Booker T) in an upset in Ludwigshafen, Rheinland-Pfalz. Andersson would go on to defeat both members of Harlem Heat in subsequent matches on the tour, and concluded this run with a victory over Alex Wright on March 17 in Bayern, Germany.

In May 1994, Andersson traveled to the United States and defeated Ron Oakes on WCW Worldwide, making his television debut. He beat Oakes again on May 25 on WCW Saturday Night, and would go on to frequently appear on WCW television in 1994 and 1995. He secured wins over Tony Vincent (Tony Vendetta), Mark Starr, and Sgt Buddy Lee Parker, amongst others. On June 26, 1995 he defeated Chris Sawyer on WCW Pro, after which he retired from wrestling.

=== Comeback (2014) ===
Andersson returned to the ring for SWS (Svensk Wrestling Syd) at a show on August 30, 2014 at Malmö, Sweden. Teaming with Jim Duggan, the duo defeated Anderson and Steinbolt. On September 6, 2014 he traveled to STHLM Wrestling for their STHLM Return Of The King event in Stockholm. Wrestling in the main event, Andersson defeated Ken Malmsteen to win the STHLM Wrestling Title

== Media career ==
He was a participant on Let's Dance 2011, the Swedish version of Strictly Come Dancing / Dancing with the Stars, where he finished second.

In his youth Andersson recorded the music single "Frank's Disco", the song contains music and Andersson being interviewed in the background.

Andersson also appeared in the film Göta Kanal in 1981. He participated as a celebrity contestant on Expedition Robinson V.I.P. He also appeared on the seventh season of Mästarnas mästare; broadcast on SVT, he was the first to be eliminated.

== Personal life ==
Andersson was diagnosed with attention deficit hyperactivity disorder in 2010.

== Death ==
In late August 2018, Andersson was admitted to hospital with heart problems. On 6 September, Andersson went through surgery. A few days later, he developed complications, and on 9 September 2018, he died at the age of 62.

== Championships and accomplishments ==
- STHLM Wrestling
  - STHLM Wrestling Championship (1 time)
- Pro Wrestling Illustrated
  - PWI ranked him #115 of the 500 best singles wrestlers in the PWI 500 in 1994

Preceded by Anders Gärderud & Bernt Johansson	Svenska Dagbladet Gold Medal; 1977	Succeeded by Björn Borg & Ingemar Stenmark
