= Sándor Major =

Hungarian wrestler

Personal information
- Nationality: Hungarian
- Born: 31 July 1965 (age 60) Budapest, Hungary

Sport
- Sport: Wrestling

Sándor Major (born 31 July 1965) is a Hungarian wrestler. He competed in the men's Greco-Roman 90 kg at the 1988 Summer Olympics.
