= Daniel Sánchez (wrestler) =

Puerto Rican wrestler (born 1968)

Daniel Sánchez (born 29 July 1968) is a Puerto Rican former wrestler who competed in the 1992 Summer Olympics and in the 1996 Summer Olympics.
