= Renato Lombardo =

Italian wrestler

Personal information
- Nationality: Italian
- Born: 11 March 1965 (age 61) Catania, Italy

Sport
- Sport: Wrestling

Renato Lombardo (born 11 March 1965) is an Italian wrestler. He competed in the men's freestyle 90 kg at the 1992 Summer Olympics.
