= Vladimir Modosyan =

Wrestler

Personal information
- Born: 16 June 1958 (age 68) Gori, Georgian SSR
- Weight: 82 kg (181 lb)

Sport
- Sport: Wrestling
- Event: Freestyle
Medal record
Men's freestyle wrestling
Representing the Soviet Union
World Championships
| Gold medal – first place | 1986 Budapest | 82 kg |
| Bronze medal – third place | 1987 Clermont-Ferrand | 82 kg |
European Championships
| Silver medal – second place | 1982 Varna | 82 kg |
| Silver medal – second place | 1987 Veliko Tarnovo | 82 kg |
World Cup
| Silver medal – second place | 1984 Toledo, Ohio | 82 kg |
| Gold medal – first place | 1985 Toledo | 82 kg |
| Bronze medal – third place | 1986 Toledo | 82 kg |
Goodwill Games
| Gold medal – first place | 1986 Moscow | 82 kg |

Vladimir Modosyan (born 16 June 1958) is a Soviet Armenian former Freestyle wrestler. He is a World Champion, two-time European Championships silver medalist, and World Cup winner.

== Biography ==
Modosyan started wrestling in 1968. In 1975, he moved to Krasnoyarsk and started training under the guidance of the honored coach of the USSR Dmitry Mindiashvili. From 1982 to 1987, Modosyan was a member of the Soviet national freestyle wrestling team. He came in first place at the 1985 Wrestling World Cup. Modosyan had his most successful year in 1986, when he won the gold medal at the 1986 World Wrestling Championships and 1986 Goodwill Games. He won his second silver medal at the 1987 European Wrestling Championships.

After completing his wrestling career, he took up coaching, becoming part of the coaching staff of the Russian national freestyle wrestling team. The most famous disciples of Vladimir Modosyan are the Russian Champion and World Championship medalist Albert Saritov and the two-time World Champion Viktor Lebedev.
