= Kamal Ibrahim (wrestler) =

Egyptian wrestler

Kamal Ibrahim (كمال ابراهيم; born January 10, 1961) is a former Egyptian wrestler.

Ibrahim was 6 ft 2.5 in (189 cm) tall and weighed 198 lb (90 kg) when he competed in the Olympics.

== Wrestling career ==
He competed for Egypt at the 1984 Summer Olympics in Los Angeles as a Men's Light-Heavyweight in Greco-Roman Wrestling. He was defeated by Evan Bernstein of Israel in the first round, received a bye in the second round, beat Roberto Neves Filho of Brazil in the third round, and lost to Georgios Poikilidis of Greece in the fourth round.

Ibrahim also competed for Egypt at the 1988 Summer Olympics in Seoul in the same event. He lost to Uwe Sachs of West Germany in the first round, and Ilie Matei of Romania in the second round.
