= Andrzej Malina =

Polish wrestler (born 1960)

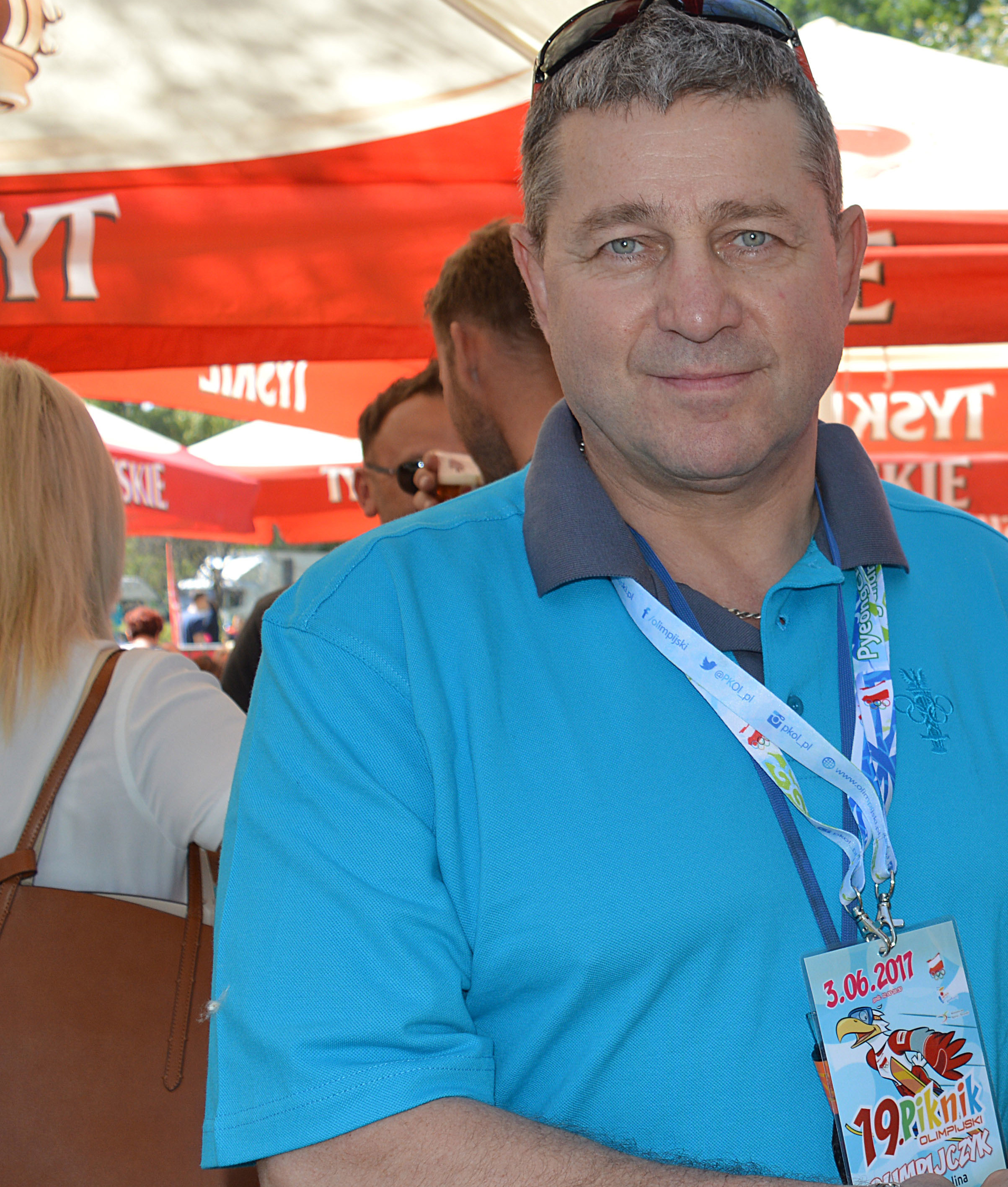
- Malina in 2017

Personal information
- Full name: Andrzej Janusz Malina
- Born: 11 October 1960 (age 65) Klarysew, Poland
- Height: 178 cm (5 ft 10 in)

Sport
- Sport: Greco-Roman wrestling
Medal record
Representing Poland
World Championships
Gold medal – first place	1986 Budapest	90 kg
European Championships
Silver medal – second place	1982 Varna	82 kg
Bronze medal – third place	1983 Budapest	82 kg

Andrzej Janusz Malina (Polish pronunciation: [ˈand͡ʐɛj maˈlina]; born 11 October 1960) is a Polish former professional wrestler in Greco-Roman style. He won gold medal at the 1986 World Wrestling Championships and was voted the Polish Sports Personality of the Year in 1986.

== Career ==
He was born on 11 October 1960 in Klarysew, near Piaseczno, Polish People's Republic. In 1979, he graduated from high school in Piaseczno and in 1999 from the AWF Gorzów Wielkopolski University. He trained in the Elektronik Piaseczno sports club in the years 1972-79 and then he represented the CWKS Legia Warszawa (1979-1989).

He won gold medal at the 1986 World Wrestling Championships held in Budapest as well as silver and bronze medals at the European Wrestling Championships in Varna and Budapest. He is a four-time Polish champion, first in middleweight division (1980 and 1982) and later in light heavyweight division (1983 and 1985). In 1986, he was chosen the Polish Sportspersonality of the Year, becoming the first wrestler to win the title. He took part in the 1988 Summer Olympics in Seoul representing Poland in the light heavyweight category (90 kg). In 1996, he was awarded the Cross of Merit for his achievements in sport. He worked as an assistant to Ryszard Świerad during the 1996 Summer Olympics in Atlanta where athletes from Poland won five medals in wrestling including three golds.

== See also ==
- Polish Sportspersonality of the Year
- Sport in Poland
- List of Poles
