= Akira Ōta =

Japanese wrestler (born 1957)

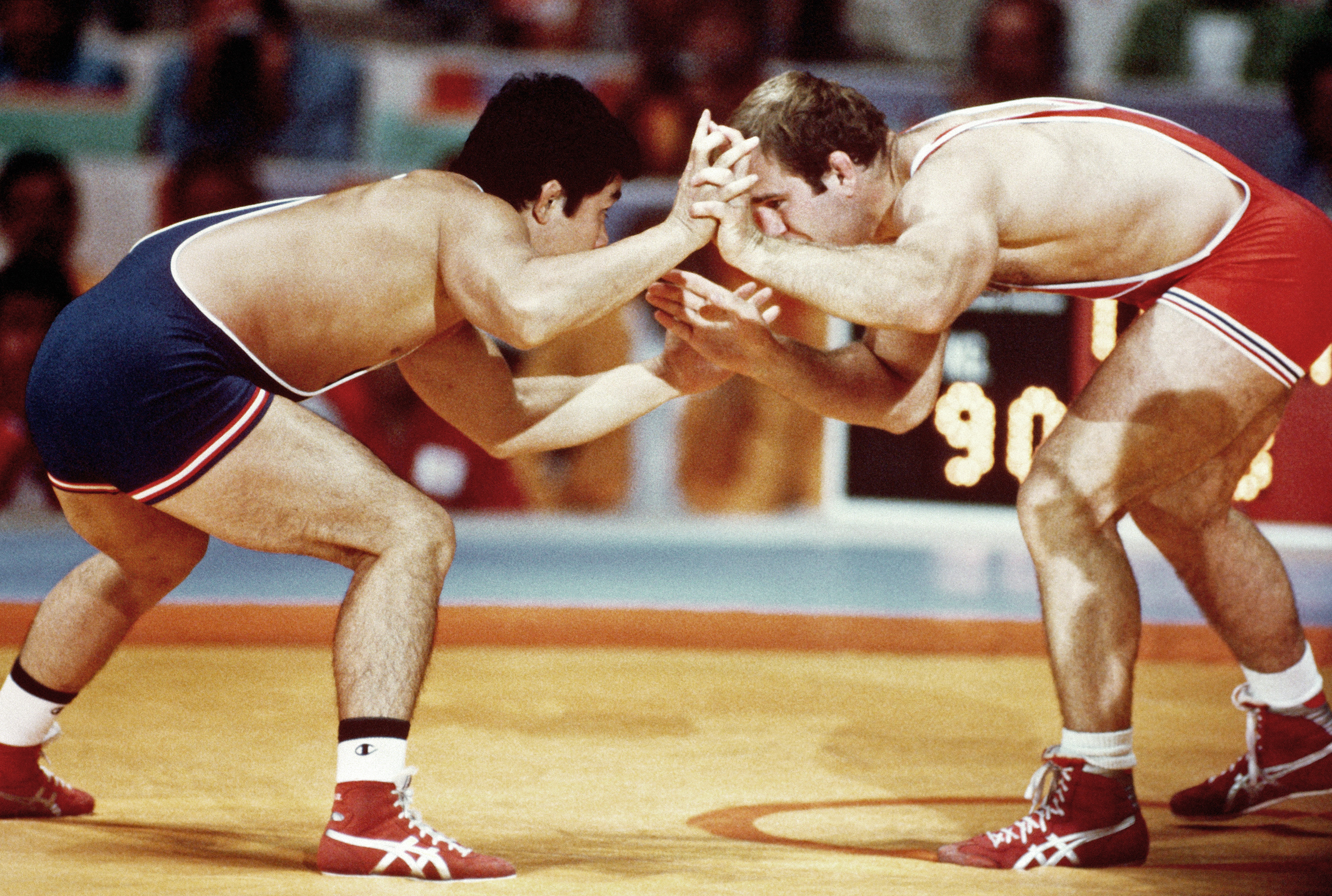
- Ōta (left) wrestles Ed Banach during the 1984 Summer Olympics

Personal information
- Born: 8 April 1957 (age 69) Akita, Japan
Medal record
Men's freestyle wrestling
Representing Japan
Olympic Games
Silver medal – second place	1984 Los Angeles	90 kg
Silver medal – second place	1988 Seoul	90 kg

Akira Ōta (born 8 April 1957 in Akita) is a Japanese former wrestler who competed in the 1984 Summer Olympics, in the 1988 Summer Olympics, and in the 1992 Summer Olympics.
