= Georgios Pozidis =

Greek wrestler (1956–2019)

Personal information
- Nationality: Greek
- Born: 2 February 1956
- Died: 1 August 2019 (aged 63)

Sport
- Sport: Wrestling

Georgios Pozidis (2 February 1956 – 1 August 2019) was a Greek wrestler. He competed at the 1980 Summer Olympics and the 1984 Summer Olympics.
