= Makharbek Khadartsev =

Soviet wrestler (born 1964)

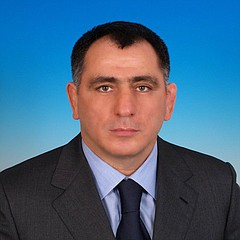

Personal information
- Native name: Махарбек Хазбиевич Хадарцев
- Full name: Makharbek Khazbiyevich Khadartsev
- Nationality: Ossetian
- Born: 2 October 1964 (age 61) Alagirsky District, North Ossetia–Alania, Soviet Union
- Years active: 1982-2000
- Height: 1.78 m (5 ft 10 in)
- Weight: 90 kg (198 lb)
- Relative: Aslan Khadartsev (brother)

Sport
- Country: Soviet Union (1982-1991); Russia (1993-1999); Uzbekistan (2000)
- Sport: Wrestling
- Event: Freestyle
- Club: SKA Vladikavkaz; Dynamo Tashkent
- Coached by: Kazbek Dedikaev
Medal record
Men's freestyle wrestling
Olympic Games
Representing the Soviet Union
Gold medal – first place	1988 Seoul	90 kg
Representing the Unified Team
Gold medal – first place	1992 Barcelona	90 kg
Representing Russia
Silver medal – second place	1996 Atlanta	90 kg
World Championships
Representing the Soviet Union
Gold medal – first place	1986 Budapest	90 kg
Gold medal – first place	1987 Clermont-Ferrand	90 kg
Gold medal – first place	1989 Martigny	90 kg
Gold medal – first place	1990 Tokyo	90 kg
Gold medal – first place	1991 Varna	90 kg
Representing Russia
Silver medal – second place	1994 Istanbul	90 kg
Silver medal – second place	1995 Atlanta	90 kg
Bronze medal – third place	1993 Toronto	90 kg
Representing the Soviet Union
Goodwill Games
Gold medal – first place	1986 Moscow	90 kg
Gold medal – first place	1990 Seattle	90 kg
Gold medal – first place	1994 Saint Petersburg	90 kg

Makharbek Khazbiyevich Khadartsev (Russian: Махарбек Хазбиевич Хадарцев) (born 2 October 1964) is a Soviet-Russian politician and former wrestler who later competed for Russia and Uzbekistan, two times Olympic champion and five times world champion in Freestyle wrestling. He was born in Suadag, Alagirsky District, North Ossetia.

== Olympics ==
Khadartsev competed at the 1988 Summer Olympics in Seoul, where he received a gold medal in Freestyle wrestling, the light heavyweight class.

He won a second gold medal at the 1992 Summer Olympics in Barcelona.

Competing for Russia at the 1996 Summer Olympics in Atlanta, he received a silver medal. At the 2000 Summer Olympics, he placed 14th while competing for Uzbekistan.

== World championships ==
Khadartsev won a gold medal at the 1986 FILA Wrestling World Championships in Budapest. He received gold medals also in 1987, 1989, 1990 and 1991.
