= Atanas Komchev =

Bulgarian Greco-Roman wrestler

Medal record

Men's Greco-Roman wrestling

Representing Bulgaria

Olympic Games
Gold medal – first place	1988 Seoul	90 kg

World Championships
Silver medal – second place	1982 Katowice	90 kg
Silver medal – second place	1983 Kiev	90 kg
Silver medal – second place	1986 Budapest	90 kg
Bronze medal – third place	1985 Kolbotn	90 kg
Bronze medal – third place	1987 Clermont-Ferrand	90 kg

Atanas Slavchev Komshev (Bulgarian: Атанас Славчев Комшев, 23 October 1959 – 12 November 1994) was a Bulgarian wrestler and Olympic champion.

He became Olympic champion in 1988 in the Greco-Roman light heavyweight class. He received three silver medals and two bronze medals in the FILA Wrestling World Championships. Komchev was in an automobile accident on 2 November 1994 and died 10 days later, on 12 November.
