= Olaf Koschnitzke =

German wrestler

Personal information
- Nationality: German
- Born: 12 September 1966 (age 59) Grevesmühlen, Germany

Sport
- Sport: Wrestling

Olaf Koschnitzke (born 12 September 1966) is a German wrestler. He competed in the men's Greco-Roman 90 kg at the 1988 Summer Olympics.
