= 1986 World Wrestling Championships =

- Host city: Budapest, Hungary
- Dates: 19–26 October 1986

Champions
- Freestyle: Soviet Union
- Greco-Roman: Soviet Union

The 1986 World Wrestling Championships were held in Budapest, Hungary from 19 to 26 October 1986.

== Medal table ==
Rank	Nation	Gold	Silver	Bronze	Total
1	Soviet Union	11	4	2	17
2	Hungary	2	1	1	4
3	Poland	2	1	0	3
4	North Korea	2	0	0	2
5	Bulgaria	1	4	5	10
6	United States	1	3	3	7
7	Cuba	1	0	1	2
7	Sweden	1	0	1	2
9	East Germany	0	2	1	3
10	Japan	0	1	1	2
10	Romania	0	1	1	2
12	Finland	0	1	0	1
12	Norway	0	1	0	1
14	Czechoslovakia	0	0	2	2
15	Greece	0	0	1	1
15	Mongolia	0	0	1	1
15	West Germany	0	0	1	1
Totals (17 entries)		21	19	21	61

== Team ranking ==
Rank	Men's freestyle		Men's Greco-Roman	
Rank	Team	Points	Team	Points
1	Soviet Union	51	Soviet Union	46
2	United States	34	Bulgaria	30
3	Bulgaria	25	Poland	20.5
4	Cuba	15	Hungary	20.5
5	East Germany	14	Romania	15
6	North Korea	12	Sweden	11.5

== Medal summary ==
=== Freestyle ===
Event	Gold	Silver	Bronze
48 kg	Ri Jae-sik; North Korea	László Bíró; Hungary	Mikhail Kushnir; Soviet Union
52 kg	Kim Yong-sik; North Korea	Mitsuru Sato; Japan	Valentin Yordanov; Bulgaria
57 kg	Sergey Beloglazov; Soviet Union	Georgi Kalchev; Bulgaria	Barry Davis; United States
62 kg	Khazar Isayev; Soviet Union	Joe McFarland; United States	Avirmediin Enkhee; Mongolia
68 kg	Arsen Fadzaev; Soviet Union	Andre Metzger; United States	Simeon Shterev; Bulgaria
74 kg	Raúl Cascaret; Cuba	Adlan Varaev; Soviet Union	Dave Schultz; United States
82 kg	Vladimir Modosyan; Soviet Union	Aleksandar Nanev; Bulgaria	Jozef Lohyňa; Czechoslovakia
90 kg	Makharbek Khadartsev; Soviet Union	Torsten Wagner; East Germany	Jim Scherr; United States
100 kg	Aslan Khadartsev; Soviet Union	Bill Scherr; United States	Georgi Yanchev; Bulgaria
130 kg	Bruce Baumgartner; United States	David Gobejishvili; Soviet Union	Andreas Schröder; East Germany

=== Greco-Roman ===
Event	Gold	Silver	Bronze
48 kg	Mahaddin Allahverdiyev; Soviet Union	Bratan Tsenov; Bulgaria	Reinaldo Jiménez; Cuba
52 kg	Sergey Dyudyaev; Soviet Union	Jon Rønningen; Norway	Atsuji Miyahara; Japan
57 kg	Emil Ivanov; Bulgaria	Timerzhan Kalimulin; Soviet Union	Charalambos Cholidis; Greece
62 kg	Kamandar Madzhidov; Soviet Union	Bogusław Klozik; Poland	Zhivko Vangelov; Bulgaria
68 kg	Levon Julfalakyan; Soviet Union	Tapio Sipilä; Finland	Claudio Passarelli; West Germany
74 kg	Mikhail Mamiashvili; Soviet Union	Mirko Jahn; East Germany	Dobri Ivanov; Bulgaria
82 kg	Tibor Komáromi; Hungary	Shared gold	Sorin Herțea; Romania
82 kg	Bogdan Daras; Poland	Shared gold	Magnus Fredriksson; Sweden
90 kg	Andrzej Malina; Poland	Atanas Komchev; Bulgaria	Jindřich Durčák; Czechoslovakia
100 kg	Tamás Gáspár; Hungary	Vasile Andrei; Romania	Anatoly Fedorenko; Soviet Union
130 kg	Tomas Johansson; Sweden	Vladimir Grigoriev; Soviet Union	László Klauz; Hungary
