= Kim Tae-woo (wrestler) =

South Korean wrestler (born 1962)

- Hangul: 김태우
- Hanja: 金泰雨
- RR: Gim Taeu
- MR: Kim T'aeu

Kim Tae-woo
Medal record

Representing South Korea

Men's freestyle wrestling

Olympic Games
Bronze medal – third place	1988 Seoul	90 kg

Asian Games
Gold medal – first place	1990 Beijing	100 kg
Gold medal – first place	1994 HIroshima	100 kg

Asian Championships
Gold medal – first place	1995 Manila	100 kg

Kim Tae-Woo (Korean: 김태우; Hanja: 金泰雨; born March 7, 1962, in Gimje, North Jeolla Province) is a retired South Korean freestyle wrestler, four-time Olympian and Olympic Bronze Medalist. Kim represented South Korea for 15 years in freestyle wrestling and is considered the greatest South Korean heavyweight wrestler of all time.

== Career ==
Kim received significant international attention at the 1988 Summer Olympics where he won the bronze medal in the freestyle 90 kg class.

Kim won two consecutive gold medals in the freestyle wrestling 100 kg class at the Asian Games (1990 and 1994). However, Kim was given a nickname unlucky fourth place player, finishing in fourth place at the 1991 World Wrestling Championships, 1992 Summer Olympics, 1993 World Wrestling Championships and 1996 Asian Wrestling Championships.

Kim officially retired from competitive wrestling after the 1996 Summer Olympics and began his coach career. He was named the head coach of the South Korean national freestyle wrestling team for the 2000 Summer Olympics and 2002 Asian Games.

Kim currently lives in Dallas, Texas, running his own business.
