= Paul Bindel =

German painter

- Born: 7 January 1894; Magdeburg, Germany
- Died: 29 May 1973 (aged 79); Düsseldorf, Germany
- Occupation: Painter

Paul Bindel (7 January 1894 – 29 May 1973) was a German painter. His work was part of the painting event in the art competition at the 1936 Summer Olympics.
