= Toni Hannula =

Finnish wrestler

Toni Leander Hannula (born 30 April 1962 in Savukoski) is a Finnish former wrestler who competed in the 1984 Summer Olympics. He spent ten years in prison between 1989 and 2010 for violent crimes and robbery.
