= Mehmet Türkkaya =

Turkish wrestler

Personal information
- Nationality: Turkish
- Born: 10 March 1964 (age 62)

Sport
- Sport: Wrestling

Mehmet Türkkaya (born 10 March 1964) is a Turkish wrestler. He competed in the men's freestyle 90 kg at the 1988 Summer Olympics.
