= Hubert Bindels =

Belgian wrestler

Personal information
- Nationality: Belgian
- Born: 8 August 1958 (age 67) Elsenborn, Belgium

Sport
- Sport: Wrestling

Hubert Bindels (born 8 August 1958) is a Belgian former wrestler. He competed in the men's freestyle 90 kg at the 1988 Summer Olympics.
