= Iraklis Deskoulidis =

Greek wrestler

Personal information
- Nationality: Greek
- Born: 1 October 1961 (age 63); Athens, Greece

Sport
- Sport: Wrestling

Iraklis Deskoulidis (born 1 October 1961) is a Greek wrestler. He competed at the 1984 Summer Olympics, the 1988 Summer Olympics and the 1992 Summer Olympics.
