= İsmail Temiz =

Turkish wrestler (born 1954)

İsmail Temiz (born 8 January 1954) is a Turkish former wrestler who competed in the 1976 Summer Olympics and in the 1984 Summer Olympics.
