= Edwin Lins =

Austrian wrestler (1963–2018)

Edwin Lins (9 March 1963 – 17 January 2018) was an Austrian wrestler who competed in the 1984 Summer Olympics and in the 1988 Summer Olympics.
