= Emil Ivanov =

Bulgarian wrestler

Medal record

Men's Greco-Roman wrestling

Representing Bulgaria

World Championships
Gold medal – first place	1986 Budapest	57 kg
Gold medal – first place	1989 Martigny	57 kg

Emil Ivanov (Bulgarian: Емил Иванов, born 30 June 1962 in Sofia) is a Bulgarian former wrestler who won the world championship in 1986 and 1989.
