= Christer Gulldén =

Swedish wrestler

Personal information
- Born: 13 August 1960 (age 65) Gothenburg, Sweden

Sport
- Country: Sweden
- Sport: Wrestling

Christer Gulldén (born 13 August 1960) is a Swedish wrestler. He competed in the 1988 Summer Olympics, where he reached the bronze final in Men's Greco-Roman 90 kg. His international results include a bronze medal at the 1981 European Championship.
