= Ilie Matei =

Romanian wrestler (born 1960)

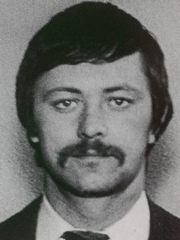

Personal information
- Born: 11 July 1960 (age 66) Râşca, Romania
- Height: 187 cm (6 ft 2 in)

Sport
- Sport: Greco-Roman wrestling
- Coached by: Costin Taparjan
Medal record
Representing Romania
Olympic Games
Silver medal – second place	1984 Los Angeles	-90 kg
European Championships
Bronze medal – third place	1983 Budapest	-90 kg
Silver medal – second place	1984 Leipzig	-90 kg
Bronze medal – third place	1985 Piraeus	-90 kg
Summer Universiade
Gold medal – first place	1981 Bucharest	-90 kg

Ilie Matei (born 11 July 1960) is a retired light-heavyweight Greco-Roman wrestler from Romania. He won silver medals at the 1984 Summer Olympics and 1985 European Championships, placing third in 1983 and 1986.
