= Franz Pitschmann =

Austrian wrestler

Franz Pitschmann (born 16 December 1954 in Hall in Tirol) is an Austrian former wrestler who competed in the 1976 Summer Olympics, in the 1980 Summer Olympics, in the 1984 Summer Olympics, and in the 1988 Summer Olympics.
