= Harri Koskela =

Finnish wrestler (born 1965)

Personal information
- Full name: Harri Matias Koskela
- Born: 8 October 1965 (age 60) Lapua, Finland

Sport
- Sport: Wrestling
- Event: Greco-Roman wrestling

Harri Koskela
Medal record

Representing Finland

Men's Greco-Roman wrestling

Olympic Games
| Silver medal – second place | 1988 Seoul | 90 kg |

Harri Matias Koskela (born 8 October 1965 in Lapua) is a Finnish wrestler and Olympic medalist in Greco-Roman wrestling.

== Olympics ==
Koskela competed at the 1988 Summer Olympics in Seoul where he received the silver medal in Greco-Roman wrestling, the light heavyweight class.

== World championships ==
Koskela received a silver medal at the 1990 FILA Wrestling World Championships, and a bronze medal at the 1991 FILA Wrestling World Championships.
