= Jean-Baptiste Youmbi =

Cameroonian wrestler

Personal information
- Nationality: Cameroonian
- Born: 12 February 1964 (age 61)

Sport
- Sport: Wrestling

Jean-Baptiste Youmbi (born 12 February 1964) is a Cameroonian wrestler who competed in two events at the 1988 Summer Olympics.
