= Bodo Lukowski =

German wrestler

Personal information
- Nationality: German
- Born: 2 June 1961 (age 63); Bochum, West Germany

Sport
- Sport: Wrestling

Bodo Lukowski (born 2 June 1961) is a German wrestler. He competed at the 1984 Summer Olympics and the 1988 Summer Olympics.
