= Andreas Steinbach =

German wrestler

Personal information
- Nationality: German
- Born: 7 July 1965 (age 59); Dushanbe, Tajik SSR, Soviet Union

Sport
- Sport: Wrestling

Andreas Steinbach (born 7 July 1965) is a German wrestler. He competed at the 1988 Summer Olympics and the 1992 Summer Olympics.
