= Moustapha Guèye =

Senegalese wrestler

Personal information
- Nationality: Senegalese
- Born: 19 October 1961 (age 63)

Sport
- Sport: Wrestling

Moustapha Guèye (born 19 October 1961) is a Senegalese wrestler. He competed in two events at the 1988 Summer Olympics.
