= Roberto Neves Filho =

Brazilian wrestler (born 1965)

Personal information
- Full name: Roberto Cláudio Leitao Neves Filho
- Born: 6 February 1965 (age 61) Rio de Janeiro, Brazil
Medal record
Men's freestyle wrestling
Representing Brazil
Pan American Games
Silver medal – second place	1987 Indianapolis	Freestyle (– 90 kg)

Roberto Cláudio Leitao Neves Filho (born 6 February 1965) is a Brazilian wrestler. He competed at the 1988 Summer Olympics and the 1992 Summer Olympics. Son of Roberto Leitão.
