= Abdul-Rahman Breesam =

Iraqi wrestler (born 1959)

Abdul-Rahman Breesam Mohammed
Personal information
- Nationality: Iraqi
- Born: 1959 (age 66–67)

Sport
- Sport: Wrestling
Medal record
Men's freestyle wrestling
Representing Iraq
Asian Games
Bronze medal – third place	1978 Bangkok	82 kg

Abdul-Rahman Breesam Mohammed (Arabic: عبد الرحمن بريسم محمد, born 1959) is an Iraqi wrestler who competed at the 1980 Summer Olympics and the 1984 Summer Olympics. He is also known as Abdul Rahman Mohammed or Abdul Breesam Rahman.
