= Jean-François Court =

French wrestler

Jean-François Court (born 1 September 1957) is a French former wrestler who competed in the 1984 Summer Olympics and in the 1988 Summer Olympics.
