= Jerzy Nieć =

Polish wrestler

Personal information
- Nationality: Polish
- Born: 30 June 1964 (age 62) Kraśnik, Poland

Sport
- Sport: Wrestling

Jerzy Nieć (born 30 June 1964) is a Polish wrestler. He competed in the men's freestyle 90 kg at the 1988 Summer Olympics.
