= Brazil at the 1988 Summer Olympics =

- IOC code: BRA
- NOC: Brazilian Olympic Committee

in Seoul
- Competitors: 160 (127 men, 33 women) in 21 sports
- Flag bearer: Walter Carmona
- Medals Ranked 24th: Gold 1 Silver 2 Bronze 3 Total 6

Summer Olympics appearances (overview)
- 1920; 1924; 1928; 1932; 1936; 1948; 1952; 1956; 1960; 1964; 1968; 1972; 1976; 1980; 1984; 1988; 1992; 1996; 2000; 2004; 2008; 2012; 2016; 2020; 2024; 2028

Brazil competed at the 1988 Summer Olympics in Seoul, South Korea. 160 competitors, 127 men and 33 women, took part in 106 events in 21 sports. Brazilians conquered 6 medals in Seoul, but only one gold medal.

Aurelio Miguel Fernandez became the first Brazilian judoka to win a gold medal. He defeated Marc Meiling from West Germany in men's 95 kg category.

The previous Olympic champion runner Joaquim Cruz won the silver medal in men's 800 metres.

Men's Brazil Olympic football team was silver medalist led by Romário and Bebeto. They lost the final by 2 - 1 at extra time against Soviet Union

Robson Caetano was the first Brazilian sprinter to win an Olympic medal, a bronze in the men's 200 metres.

The other two bronze medals were obtained in sailing. Together with Nelson Falcão, Torben Grael won the medal at Star class. It was Torben Grael's second olympic medal. Torben's brother Lars Grael and Clinio Freitas obtained the bronze at Tornado class.

== Medalists ==
Medal	Name	Sport	Event	Date
Gold	Aurélio Miguel	Judo	Men's 95 kg	30 September
Silver	Joaquim Cruz	Athletics	Men's 800 metres	26 September
Silver	Men's Brazil Olympic football team: Ademir; Aloísio; Andrade; Batista; Bebeto; Careca; André Cruz; Edmar; Geovani; João Paulo; Jorginho; Milton; Neto; Romário; Cláudio Taffarel; Luiz Carlos Winck; Ricardo Gomes; Mazinho; Valdo Filho; Zé Carlos	Football	Men's tournament	1 October
Bronze	Lars Grael; Clinio Freitas	Sailing	Tornado	27 September
Bronze	Torben Grael; Nelson Falcão	Sailing	Star	27 September
Bronze	Robson da Silva	Athletics	Men's 200 metres	28 September

Medals by sport
Sport	1st place, gold medalist(s)	2nd place, silver medalist(s)	3rd place, bronze medalist(s)	Total
Judo	1	0	0	1
Athletics	0	1	1	2
Football	0	1	0	1
Sailing	0	0	2	2
Total	1	2	3	6

Medals by gender
Gender	1st place, gold medalist(s)	2nd place, silver medalist(s)	3rd place, bronze medalist(s)	Total
Male	1	2	3	6
Female	0	0	0	0
Mixed	0	0	0	0
Total	1	2	3	6

== Competitors ==
The following is the list of number of competitors in the Games.

Sport	Men	Women	Total
Archery	2	0	2
Athletics	14	6	20
Basketball	12	0	12
Boxing	3	–	3
Cycling	8	0	8
Diving	0	1	1
Equestrian	3	1	4
Fencing	4	0	4
Football	16	–	16
Gymnastics	1	1	2
Judo	7	–	7
Rowing	10	0	10
Sailing	14	2	16
Shooting	2	2	4
Swimming	11	4	15
Synchronized swimming	–	3	3
Table tennis	2	0	2
Tennis	2	1	3
Volleyball	12	12	24
Weightlifting	2	–	2
wrestling	2	–	2
Total	127	33	160

== Archery ==
In its third Olympic archery competition, Brazil sent two men.

Men

Athlete	Event	Round 1		Round 2		Total score	
Athlete	Event	Score	Seed	Score	Seed	Score	Seed
Jorge Azevedo	Individual	1191	62	Did not advance			
Renato Emilio	Individual	1225	43	Did not advance			

== Athletics ==
Men
Track & road events

Athlete	Event	Heat		Quarterfinal		Semifinal		Final	
Athlete	Event	Result	Rank	Result	Rank	Result	Rank	Result	Rank
José Luíz Barbosa	800 m	1:46.32	2 Q	1:46.20	3 Q	1:44.99	3 Q	1:46.39	6
José Luíz Barbosa	1500 m	3:44.46	33	Did not advance					
Jailto Bonfim	100 m	10.75	5	Did not advance					
Joaquim Cruz	800 m	1:47.16	1 Q	1:46.10	1 Q	1:44.75	2 Q	1:43.90	Silver
Joaquim Cruz	1500 m	3:40.92	3 q	—N/a		DNS		Did not advance	
Adauto Domingues	3000 m steeplechase	8:32.77	5 Q	—N/a		8:35.05	11	Did not advance	
Agberto Guimarães	800 m	1:48.49	5	Did not advance					
Sérgio de Menezes	400 m	DNF		Did not advance					
Marcelo Palma	20 km walk	—N/a						1:31:42	45
Ivo Rodrigues	Marathon	—N/a						2:26:27	56
Diamantino dos Santos	Marathon	—N/a						2:25:13	48
Arnaldo da Silva	100 m	10.44	2 Q	10.25	2 Q	10.32	5	Did not advance	
Robson da Silva	100 m	10.37	1 Q	10.24	2 Q	10.24	4 Q	10.11	5
Robson da Silva	200 m	21.12	1 Q	20.41	1 Q	20.28	2 Q	20.04	Bronze
Gerson de Souza	400 m	45.90	1 Q			Did not advance			

Field events

Athlete	Event	Qualification		Final	
Athlete	Event	Distance	Position	Distance	Position
Abcélvio Rodrigues	Triple jump	15.13	35	Did not advance	
Jorge da Silva	Triple jump	15.95	22	Did not advance	

Women
Track & road events

Athlete	Event	Heat		Quarterfinal		Semifinal		Final	
Athlete	Event	Result	Rank	Result	Rank	Result	Rank	Result	Rank
Angélica de Almeida	Marathon	—N/a						2:43:40	44
Maria Magnólia Figueiredo	200 m	23.71	2 Q	23.67	6	Did not advance			
Maria Magnólia Figueiredo	400 m	51.74	1 Q	51.32	5	Did not advance			
Soraya Telles	800 m	2:02.48	3 Q	—N/a		2:01.86	6	Did not advance	
Tânia Miranda; Suzete Montalvão; Soraya Telles; Maria Magnólia Figueiredo	4 × 400 m	3:36.81	4	Did not advance					

Combined events – Heptathlon

Athlete	Event	100H	HJ	SP	200 m	LJ	JT	800 m	Final	Rank
Conceição Geremias	Result	14.23	1.71	12.95	25.50	5.50	39.64	2:24.02	5508	22
Conceição Geremias	Points	946	867	724	841	700	660	770	5508	22

== Basketball ==
Summary

Team	Event	Group Stage						Quarterfinal	Semifinal	Final / BM	
Team	Event	Opposition score	Opposition score	Opposition score	Opposition score	Opposition score	Rank	Opposition score	Opposition score	Opposition score	Rank
Brazil men's	Men's tournament	Canada; W 125–109	China; W 130–108	United States; L 87–102	Egypt; W 138–85	Spain; L 110–118	3 Q	Soviet Union; L 105–110	Puerto Rico; W 104–86 (Class. 5–8)	Canada; W 106–90 (Class. 5/6)	5

=== Men's tournament ===
Team roster

The following is the Brazil roster in the men's basketball tournament of the 1988 Summer Olympics.

Brazil men's national basketball team – 1988 Summer Olympics roster
Players
Coaches

Pos.	No.	Name	Age – Date of birth	Height	Club	Ctr.
C	4	Paulinho	25 – 26 January 1963	2.17 m (7 ft 1 in)
PG	5	Guerrinha	29 – 21 June 1959	1.86 m (6 ft 1 in)
PF	6	Gerson Victalino	29 – 17 September 1959	2.05 m (6 ft 9 in)
SF	7	João Vianna	24 – 15 November 1963	2.06 m (6 ft 9 in)
C	8	Rolando Ferreira	24 – 24 May 1964	2.16 m (7 ft 1 in)
SG	9	Cadum	18 – 4 October 1969	2.00 m (6 ft 7 in)
PG	10	Maury de Souza	26 – 2 September 1962	1.90 m (6 ft 3 in)
SG	11	Marcel de Souza	31 – 4 December 1956	1.99 m (6 ft 6 in)
SF	12	Luiz de Azevedo	23 – 8 October 1964	1.95 m (6 ft 5 in)
C	13	Paulão	25 – 21 July 1963	2.17 m (7 ft 1 in)
PF	14	Oscar Schmidt	30 – 16 February 1958	2.05 m (6 ft 9 in)	JuveCaserta Basket	(Italy)
C	15	Israel Andrade	28 – 17 January 1960	2.06 m (6 ft 9 in)

Legend

- Club – describes last
  club before the tournament
- Age – describes age
  on 17 September 1988

Group play

Pos	Team	Pld	W	L	PF	PA	PD	Pts	Qualification
1	United States	5	5	0	485	302	+183	10	Quarterfinals
2	Spain	5	4	1	484	435	+49	9	Quarterfinals
3	Brazil	5	3	2	590	522	+68	8	Quarterfinals
4	Canada	5	2	3	479	455	+24	7	Quarterfinals
5	China	5	1	4	433	527	−94	6	9th–12th classification round
6	Egypt	5	0	5	338	568	−230	5	9th–12th classification round

Source: FIBA archive
Rules for classification: 1) points; 2) head-to-head points; 3) head-to-head goal average; 4) head-to-head number of points scored.

17 September 1988

Brazil	125–109	Canada
Scoring by half: 56–45, 69–64

Jamsil Gymnasium, Seoul

20 September 1988

Brazil	130–108	China
Scoring by half: 72–61, 58–47

Jamsil Gymnasium, Seoul

21 September 1988

Brazil	87–102	United States
Scoring by half: 55–63, 32–39

Jamsil Gymnasium, Seoul

23 September 1988

Brazil	138–85	Egypt
Scoring by half: 66–38, 72–47

Jamsil Gymnasium, Seoul

24 September 1988

Brazil	110–118	Spain
Scoring by half: 57–61, 53–57

Jamsil Gymnasium, Seoul

Quarterfinals

26 September 1988
19:30

Boxscore

Soviet Union	110–105	Brazil
Scoring by half: 53–58, 57–47
Pts: Kurtinaitis 24; Rebs: Sabonis 9 Asts: Sabonis, Tarakanov, Volkov 2		Pts: Schmidt 46; Rebs: Israel 11; Asts: Maury 5

Jamsil Gymnasium, Seoul

Classification round 5–8

28 September 1988
9:45

Boxscore

Brazil	104–86	Puerto Rico
Scoring by half: 51–39, 53–47
Pts: Schmidt 46; Rebs: Schmidt 9 Asts: Guerrinha 7		Pts: E. de León 19; Rebs: E. de León 10; Asts: Cruz 2

Jamsil Gymnasium, Seoul

Classification round 5/6

30 September 1988
09:45

Boxscore

Brazil	106–90	Canada
Scoring by half: 43–39, 63–51
Pts: Schmidt 41; Rebs: Pipoka 17; Asts: Villas Boas, Schmidt 2		Pts: Triano 29; Rebs: Hatch 10; Asts: Yearwood 3

Jamsil Gymnasium, Seoul

== Boxing ==
Men

Athlete	Event	1 Round	2 Round	3 Round	Quarterfinals	Semifinals	Final	
Athlete	Event	Opposition Result	Opposition Result	Opposition Result	Opposition Result	Opposition Result	Opposition Result	Rank
Joilson Santana	Bantamweight	Phetsmone Sonnavanh (LAO); W 5–0	Slimane Zengli (ALG); L 0–5	Did not advance				
Wanderley Oliveira	Welterweight	Dimus Chisala (ZAM); L RSC-2	Did not advance					
Peter Silva	Light middleweight	Charles Mahlalela (SWZ); W 5–0	Rey Rivera (PUR); L KO-1	Did not advance				

== Cycling ==
Eight cyclists, all men, represented Brazil in 1988.

=== Road ===
Athlete	Event	Time	Rank
Cássio Freitas	Men's road race	4:32:56	20
Wanderley Magalhães Azevedo	Men's road race	4:32:56	63
Marcos Mazzaron	Men's road race	4:32:56	66
Wanderley Magalhães Azevedo; César Daneliczen; Cássio Freitas; Marcos Mazzaron	Team time trial	2:07:11.7	18

=== Track ===
1000m time trial

Athlete	Event	Time	Rank
Clóvis Anderson	1000m time trial	1:06.282	10

Points race

Athlete	Event	Semifinal			Final		
Athlete	Event	Points	Laps behind	Rank	Points	Laps behind	Rank
Fernando Louro	Points race	10	1	12 Q	0	3	24

Pursuit

Athlete	Event	Qualification		Quarterfinals	Semifinals	Final	
Athlete	Event	Time	Rank	Opposition Time	Opposition Time	Opposition Time	Rank
Antônio Silvestre	Individual pursuit	5:02.07	20	Did not advance			
Clóvis Anderson; Paulo Jamur; Fernando Louro; Antônio Silvestre	Men's team pursuit	4:38.21	19	Did not advance			

== Diving ==
Women

Athlete	Event	Preliminary		Final	
Athlete	Event	Points	Rank	Total	Rank
Ângela Ribeiro	3 m springboard	396.51	19	Did not advance	

== Equestrianism ==
=== Show jumping ===
Athlete	Horse	Event	Qualification						Final					
Athlete	Horse	Event	Penalties	Rank	Penalties	Rank	Total	Rank	Penalties	Rank	Penalties	Rank	Total	Rank
André Johannpeter	Heartbreaker	Individual	29.00	46	39.00	36	68.00 Q	38	9.50	25	Did not advance			
Christina Johannpeter	Societao	Individual	6.00	67	AC	DNF	AC	DNF	Did not advance					
Paulo Stewart	Platon	Individual	27.50	47	AC	DNF	AC	DNF	Did not advance					
Vitor Teixeira	Going	Individual	46.00	29	67.50	7	113.50 Q	16	8.75	24	Did not advance			
André Johannpeter; Christina Johannpeter; Paulo Stewart; Vitor Teixeira	See above	Team	—N/a						40.00	10 Q	35.00	9	75.00	8

== Fencing ==
Four fencers, all men, represented Brazil in 1988.

Men's foil

- Antônio Machado
- Roberto Lazzarini
- Douglas Fonseca

Men's épée

- Antônio Machado
- Douglas Fonseca
- Roberto Lazzarini

=== Individual ===
Athlete	Event	Elimination round	Round I	Repechage Round I	Round II	Repechage Round II	Round III	Repechage Round III	Round IV	Quarterfinal	Semifinal	Final / BM	
Athlete	Event	Opposition Score	Opposition Score	Opposition Score	Opposition Score	Opposition Score	Opposition Score	Opposition Score	Opposition Score	Opposition Score	Opposition Score	Opposition Score	Rank
Régis Avila	Individual sabre	43	Did not advance										

=== Team ===
Athlete	Event	Elimination round	1/16	Quarterfinal	Semifinal	Final / BM	
Athlete	Event	Opposition Score	Opposition Score	Opposition Score	Opposition Score	Opposition Score	Rank
Régis Avila; Douglas Fonseca; Roberto Lazzarini; Antônio Machado	Team épée	West Germany; L 3–9; United States; L 1–9	—N/a				16

== Football ==
=== Preliminary round (Group D) ===
Pos	Team	Pld	W	D	L	GF	GA	GD	Pts
1	Brazil	3	3	0	0	9	1	+8	6
2	Australia	3	2	0	1	2	3	−1	4
3	Yugoslavia	3	1	0	2	4	4	0	2
4	Nigeria	3	0	0	3	1	8	−7	0

Source: FIFA
September 18, 1988

Brazil	4–0	Nigeria

Daejeon Hanbat Stadium, Daejeon

September 20, 1988

Australia	0–3	Brazil

Dongdaemun Stadium, Seoul

September 22, 1988

Brazil	2–1	Yugoslavia

Daejeon Hanbat Stadium, Daejeon

=== Quarter-finals ===
September 25, 1988

Brazil	1–0	Argentina

Dongdaemun Stadium, Seoul
Attendance: 21,800
Referee: Kurt Röthlisberger

=== Semi-finals ===
September 27, 1988

Brazil	1–1 (a.e.t.)	West Germany
Penalties
	3–2

Olympic Stadium, Seoul
Attendance: 65,000
Referee: Keith Hackett

=== Gold-medal match ===
October 1, 1988

Soviet Union	2–1 (a.e.t.)	Brazil
Dobrovolski 61' (pen.); Savichev 103'		Romário 30'

Olympic Stadium, Seoul
Attendance: 74,000
Referee: Gérard Biguet (FRA)

==== Team roster ====
  - Claudio Taffarel
  - Zé Carlos
  - Jorginho
  - Luís Carlos Winck
  - André Cruz
  - João Santos Batista
  - Ademir
  - Mazinho
  - Edmar
  - Andrade
  - Careca Souza
  - Milton de Souza Filho
  - Geovani
  - Neto
  - Sergio Donizete
  - Bebeto
  - Aloísio
  - Romário

== Judo ==
Men

Athlete	Event	Preliminary	Round of 32	Round of 16	Quarterfinals	Semifinals	Repechage 1	Repechage 2	Repechage 3	Final / BM	
Athlete	Event	Opposition Result	Opposition Result	Opposition Result	Opposition Result	Opposition Result	Opposition Result	Opposition Result	Opposition Result	Opposition Result	Rank
Sérgio Pessoa	−60 kg	BYE	Gilles Pages (MON); W 1000–0000	Kim Jae-yup (KOR); L 0000–0010	Did not advance						
Ricardo Cardoso	−65 kg	BYE	Pavel Petřikov (TCH); L 0000–0010	Did not advance							
Luiz Onmura	−71 kg	BYE	Wiesław Błach (POL); W 0010–0000	Kerrith Brown (GBR); L 0000–0001	Did not advance						
Ezequiel Paraguassu	−78 kg	Torsten Bréchôt (GDR); L 0000–1000	Did not advance								
Wálter Carmona	−86 kg	BYE	West Iqiebor (NGR); W 1000–0000	Akinobu Osako (JPN); L 0000–0010	Did not advance						
Aurélio Miguel	−95 kg	—N/a	Dennis Stewart (GBR); W 0010–0000	Bjarni Friðriksson (ISL); W 0010–0000	Juri Fazi (ITA); W 0100–0000	Jiří Sosna (TCH); W 0100–0000	BYE			Marc Meiling (FRG); W 0100–0000	Gold medal
Frederico Flexa	+95 kg	—N/a	Abderrahim Lahcinia (MAR); W 1000–0000	Elvis Gordon (GBR); W 1000–0000	Grigory Verichev (URS); L 0000–0010	Did not advance					

== Rowing ==
Men

Athlete	Event	Heats		Repechage		Semifinals		Final	
Athlete	Event	Time	Rank	Time	Rank	Time	Rank	Time	Rank
Denis Marinho	Single sculls	7:48.33	5 R	7:22.84	3	—N/a		7:22.84	18
Ronaldo de Carvalho; Ricardo de Carvalho	Coxless pair	6:45.20	5 R	7:01.00	3 FB	6:54.89	6	7:28.30	10
Ângelo Roso Neto; Flávio de Melo; Nilton Alonso	Coxed pairs	7:27.68	5 R	NT	4	—N/a		NT	13
Marcos Arantes; Fernando Fantoni; Oswaldo Kuster Neto; Waldemar Trombetta	Coxless four	6:29.61	6 R	NT	5	—N/a		NT	14

== Sailing ==
Men

Athlete	Event	Race														Final rank	
Athlete	Event	1		2		3		4		5		6		7		Final rank	
Athlete	Event	Score	Rank	Score	Rank	Score	Rank	Score	Rank	Score	Rank	Score	Rank	Score	Rank	Score	Rank
George Rebello	Division II	13	19.0	~~23~~	~~29.0~~	23	29.0	9	15.0	13	19.0	13	19.0	17	23.0	124.0	16
Jorge Zarif Neto	Finn	19	25.0	17	23.0	18	24.0	16	22.0	~~YMP~~	~~21.0~~	11	17.0	13	19.0	126.0	19
Carlos Wanderley; Bernardo Arndt	470	7	13.0	9	15.0	~~DSQ~~	~~36.0~~	19	25.0	6	11.7	13	19.0	1	0.0	83.7	10

Women

Athlete	Event	Race														Final rank	
Athlete	Event	1		2		3		4		5		6		7		Final rank	
Athlete	Event	Score	Rank	Score	Rank	Score	Rank	Score	Rank	Score	Rank	Score	Rank	Score	Rank	Score	Rank
Cinthia Knoth; M Pellicano	470	12	18.0	~~RET~~	~~28.0~~	16	22.0	14	20.0	RET	28.0	12	18.0	12	18.0	124.0	16

Open

Athlete	Event	Race														Final rank	
Athlete	Event	1		2		3		4		5		6		7		Final rank	
Athlete	Event	Score	Rank	Score	Rank	Score	Rank	Score	Rank	Score	Rank	Score	Rank	Score	Rank	Score	Rank
Alan Adler; Marcos Tenke	Flying Dutchman	4	8.0	3	5.7	6	11.7	13	19.0	~~DSQ~~	~~29.0~~	9	15.0	11	17.0	76.4	7
Lars Grael; Clinio Freitas	Tornado	~~8~~	~~14.0~~	1	0.0	6	11.7	3	5.7	3	5.7	8	14.0	2	3.0	40.1	Bronze
Torben Grael; Nelson Falcao	Star	1	0.0	7	13.0	2	3.0	11	17.0	2	3.0	~~RET~~	~~28.0~~	8	14.0	50.0	Silver
José Paulo Dias; José Augusto Dias; Christoph Bergman	Soling	3	5.7	6	11.7	~~DSQ~~	~~27.0~~	5	10.0	11	17.0	9	15.0	4	8.0	67.4	5

== Shooting ==
Men

Athlete	Event	Final	
Athlete	Event	Score	Rank
Delival Nobre	25 m rapid fire pistol	586	24

Women

Athlete	Event	Final	
Athlete	Event	Score	Rank
Maria Amaral	25 m pistol	579	22
Maria Amaral	10 m air pistol	369	31
Tania Fassoni	25 m pistol	569	32
Tania Fassoni	10 m air pistol	372	27

Open

Athlete	Event	Qualification		Semifinal		Final	
Athlete	Event	Score	Rank	Score	Rank	Score	Rank
Rodrigo Bastos	Trap	137	40	Did not advance			

== Swimming ==
Men

Athlete	Event	Heat		Final B		Final A	
Athlete	Event	Time	Rank	Time	Rank	Time	Rank
David Castro	400 metre freestyle	4:02.48	33	Did not advance			
David Castro	1500 metre freestyle	15:57.89	32	Did not advance			
Jorge Fernandes	50 metre freestyle	24.40	37	Did not advance			
Jorge Fernandes	100 metre freestyle	52.23	33	Did not advance			
Júlio Lópes	100 metre freestyle	1:53.16	30	Did not advance			
Júlio Lópes	200 m individual medley	2:09.62	26	Did not advance			
Cristiano Michelena	200 metre freestyle	1:52.34	23	Did not advance			
Cristiano Michelena	400 metre freestyle	3:57.79	23	Did not advance			
Cristiano Michelena	1500 metre freestyle	15:50.50	26	Did not advance			
José Moreira	50 metre freestyle	24.26	33	Did not advance			
Emanuel Nascimento	100 metre freestyle	52.41	37	Did not advance			
Eduardo de Poli	100 metre butterfly	56.37	26	Did not advance			
Eduardo de Poli	200 metre butterfly	2:06.15	34	Did not advance			
Renato Ramalho	200 m individual medley	2:10.32	29	Did not advance			
Renato Ramalho	400 m individual medley	4:31.95	24	Did not advance			
Wladimir Ribeiro	100 metre butterfly	57.25	32	Did not advance			
Wladimir Ribeiro	200 metre butterfly	2:09.40	36	Did not advance			
Wladimir Ribeiro	100 metre backstroke	59.76	38	Did not advance			
Wladimir Ribeiro	200 metre backstroke	2:11.48	33	Did not advance			
Rogério Romero	100 metre backstroke	57.91	20	Did not advance			
Rogério Romero	200 metre backstroke	2:02.26	8 Q	Did not advance		2:02.28	8
Cícero Tortelli	100 metre breaststroke	1:05.50	37	Did not advance			
Cícero Tortelli	200 metre breaststroke	2:28.82	44	Did not advance			
Jorge Fernandes; Cristiano Michelena; Emanuel Nascimento; Júlio Lópes	4 × 100 metre freestyle relay	3:28.17	12	Did not advance			
Jorge Fernandes; Cristiano Michelena; Emanuel Nascimento; Júlio Lópes	4 × 200 metre freestyle relay	7:32.11	10	Did not advance			
Rogério Romero; Cícero Tortelli; Eduardo de Poli; Emanuel Nascimento	4 × 100 metre medley relay	3:53.21	18	Did not advance			

Women

Athlete	Event	Heat		Final B		Final A	
Athlete	Event	Time	Rank	Time	Rank	Time	Rank
Patrícia Amorim	200 metre freestyle	2:04.74	25	Did not advance			
Patrícia Amorim	400 metre freestyle	4:19.64	24	Did not advance			
Patrícia Amorim	800 metre freestyle	8:51.95	21	Did not advance			
Adriana Pereira	50 metre freestyle	26.56	17	Did not advance			
Adriana Pereira	100 metre freestyle	58.53	34	Did not advance			
Mônica Rezende	50 metre freestyle	27.44	31	Did not advance			
Isabelle Vieira	100 metre freestyle	59.15	37	Did not advance			
Adriana Pereira; Mônica Rezende; Patrícia Amorim; Isabelle Vieira	4 × 100 metre freestyle relay	3:56.29	11	Did not advance			

== Synchronized swimming ==
Three synchronized swimmers represented Brazil in 1988.

Women

Athlete	Event	Preliminary				Final			
Athlete	Event	Technical	Free	Total	Rank	Points	Rank	Total	Rank
Paula Carvalho	Solo	82.517	83.80	166.317	15	Did not advance			
Érika MacDavid; Eva Riera	Duet	83.425	87.60	171.025	12	Did not advance			

== Table tennis ==
Athlete	Event	Group Stage	Round of 32	Round of 16	Quarterfinals	Semifinals	Final	
Athlete	Event	Rank	Opposition Result	Opposition Result	Opposition Result	Opposition Result	Opposition Result	Rank
Claudio Kano	Men's singles	6	Did not advance					
Carlos Kawai	Men's singles	7	Did not advance					
Claudio Kano; Carlos Kawai	Men's doubles	5	Did not advance					

== Tennis ==
Athlete	Event	Round of 64	Round of 32	Round of 16	Quarterfinals	Semifinals	Final / BM	
Athlete	Event	Opposition Score	Opposition Score	Opposition Score	Opposition Score	Opposition Score	Opposition Score	Rank
Luiz Mattar	Men's singles	Masur (AUS); L 4–6, 4–6, 6–4, 7–6, 4–6	Did not advance					
Luiz Mattar; Ricardo Acioly	Men's doubles	—N/a	Matsuoka / Tsuchihashi (JPN); W 4–6, 6–4, 6–2, 6–2	Forget / Leconte (FRA); L 6–4, 5–7, 4–6, 1–6	Did not advance			
Gisele Miró	Women's singles	Kelesi (CAN); L 7–5, 7–5	Maleeva (BUL); L 5–7, 1–6	Did not advance				

== Volleyball ==
=== Men's team competition ===
==== Preliminary round ====
Pool A

Pos	Team	Pld	W	L	Pts	SW	SL	SR	SPW	SPL	SPR	Qualification
1	Soviet Union	5	4	1	9	14	4	3.500	248	190	1.305	Semifinals
2	Brazil	5	4	1	9	14	7	2.000	296	225	1.316	Semifinals
3	Sweden	5	2	3	7	9	11	0.818	220	262	0.840	5th–8th semifinals
4	Bulgaria	5	2	3	7	7	9	0.778	190	194	0.979	5th–8th semifinals
5	Italy	5	2	3	7	7	11	0.636	203	222	0.914	9th–12th semifinals
6	South Korea	5	1	4	6	5	14	0.357	200	264	0.758	9th–12th semifinals

Date		Score		Set 1	Set 2	Set 3	Set 4	Set 5	Total
17 Sep	Sweden	3–2	South Korea	10–15	5–15	15–12	17–15	15–4	62–61
18 Sep	Brazil	3–0	Italy	15–7	15–4	17–15			47–26
18 Sep	Soviet Union	3–0	Bulgaria	15–7	15–9	15–8			45–24
19 Sep	Soviet Union	3–0	Sweden	15–8	15–7	16–14			46–29
19 Sep	Bulgaria	3–0	Italy	15–7	15–8	15–6			45–21
19 Sep	South Korea	3–2	Brazil	19–17	15–8	6–15	11–15	15–12	66–67
22 Sep	Brazil	3–1	Bulgaria	13–15	15–6	15–12	15–12		58–45
22 Sep	Italy	3–2	Sweden	9–15	15–6	12–15	15–12	15–3	66–51
22 Sep	Soviet Union	3–0	South Korea	15–6	15–7	15–13			45–26
24 Sep	Brazil	3–1	Sweden	15–6	13–15	15–0	15–12		58–33
24 Sep	Bulgaria	3–0	South Korea	15–7	15–10	15–8			45–25
24 Sep	Soviet Union	3–1	Italy	15–9	15–9	12–15	15–12		57–45
26 Sep	Italy	3–0	South Korea	15–10	15–7	15–5			45–22
26 Sep	Brazil	3–2	Soviet Union	12–15	9–15	15–8	15–11	15–6	66–55
26 Sep	Sweden	3–0	Bulgaria	15–11	15–12	15–8			45–31

==== Semifinals ====
Date		Score		Set 1	Set 2	Set 3	Set 4	Set 5	Total
30 Sep	Brazil	0–3	United States	3–15	5–15	11–15			19–45

==== Bronze-medal match ====
Date		Score		Set 1	Set 2	Set 3	Set 4	Set 5	Total
02 Oct	Argentina	3–2	Brazil	15–10	15–17	15–8	12–15	15–9	72–59

==== Team roster ====
- Maurício Lima
- Wagner Rocha
- Paulo Roese
- José Montanaro Junior
- Paulo da Silva
- Renan dal Zotto
- William Silva
- Amauri Ribeiro
- Antônio Carlos Gouveia
- Domingos Lampariello Neto
- Leonidio de Pra Filho
- André Ferreira

Head coach: Paulo Freitas

=== Women's team competition ===
==== Preliminary round ====
Group B

Pos	Team	Pld	W	L	Pts	SW	SL	SR	SPW	SPL	SPR	Qualification
1	Peru	3	3	0	6	9	4	2.250	177	142	1.246	1st–4th semifinals
2	China	3	2	1	5	8	4	2.000	161	132	1.220	1st–4th semifinals
3	United States	3	1	2	4	5	8	0.625	140	167	0.838	5th–8th semifinals
4	Brazil	3	0	3	3	3	9	0.333	126	163	0.773	5th–8th semifinals

Date		Score		Set 1	Set 2	Set 3	Set 4	Set 5	Total	Report
20 Sep	China	3–0	United States	15–9	15–5	15–7			45–21	Report
20 Sep	Peru	3–0	Brazil	15–11	15–11	15–3			45–25	Report
23 Sep	Brazil	2–3	United States	16–14	5–15	13–15	15–12	7–15	56–71	Report
23 Sep	China	2–3	Peru	15–13	13–15	15–7	12–15	14–16	69–66	Report
25 Sep	China	3–1	Brazil	2–15	15–7	15–12	15–11		47–45	Report
25 Sep	Peru	3–2	United States	12–15	9–15	15–4	15–5	15–9	66–48	Report

==== 5th–8th-place semifinals ====
Date		Score		Set 1	Set 2	Set 3	Set 4	Set 5	Total	Report
27 Sep	South Korea	2–3	Brazil	6–15	17–15	15–8	4–15	15–17	57–70	Report

==== 5th-place match ====
Date		Score		Set 1	Set 2	Set 3	Set 4	Set 5	Total	Report
29 Sep	Brazil	1–3	East Germany	9–15	4–15	15–11	11–15		39–56	Report

==== Team roster ====
- Kerly Santos
- Ana Moser
- Vera Mossa
- Eliani Costa
- Ana Richa
- Dora Castanheira
- Ana Claudia Ramos
- Marcia Cunha
- Ana Lucia Barros
- Sandra Suruagy
- Fernanda Venturini
- Simone Storm

Head coach: Jorge de Barros

== Weightlifting ==
Men

Athlete	Event	Snatch		Clean & Jerk		Total	Rank
Athlete	Event	Result	Rank	Result	Rank	Total	Rank
Edwaldo Santos	67.5 kg	120.0	17	140.0	17	260.0	17
Emilson Dantas	90 kg	135.0	19	165.0	21	300.0	21

== Wrestling ==
Men's freestyle

Athlete	Event	Elimination Pool								Final round	
Athlete	Event	Round 1 Result	Round 2 Result	Round 3 Result	Round 4 Result	Round 5 Result	Round 6 Result	Round 7 Result	Rank	Final round Result	Rank
Floriano Spiess	−100 kg	Uwe Neupert (GDR); L 0–4	Fred Solovi (SAM); W 11–7	Leri Khabelov (URS); L 0–4	—N/a				6	Did not advance	

Men's Greco-Roman

Athlete	Event	Elimination Pool								Final round	
Athlete	Event	Round 1 Result	Round 2 Result	Round 3 Result	Round 4 Result	Round 5 Result	Round 6 Result	Round 7 Result	Rank	Final round Result	Rank
Roberto Neves Filho	−90 kg	BYE	Franz Pitschmann (AUT); L 0–14	Kamal Ibrahim (EGY); L 0–17	—N/a				9	Did not advance	
