= Wrestling at the 1988 Summer Olympics – Men's Greco-Roman 100 kg =

Men's Greco-Roman 100 kg at the Games of the XXIV Olympiad
- Venue: Sangmu Gymnasium
- Dates: 19–21 September 1988
- Competitors: 18 from 18 nations

Medalists
1st place, gold medalist(s)		Andrzej Wroński	Poland
2nd place, silver medalist(s)		Gerhard Himmel	West Germany
3rd place, bronze medalist(s)		Dennis Koslowski	United States

The Men's Greco-Roman 100 kg at the 1988 Summer Olympics as part of the wrestling program were held at the Sangmu Gymnasium, Seongnam.

== Medalists ==
Gold	Andrzej Wroński; Poland
Silver	Gerhard Himmel; West Germany
Bronze	Dennis Koslowski; United States

== Tournament results ==
The wrestlers are divided into 2 groups. The winner of each group decided by a double-elimination system.

Legend

- TF — Won by Fall
- SP — Won by Superiority, 12-14 points difference, the loser with points
- SO — Won by Superiority, 12-14 points difference, the loser without points
- ST — Won by Technical Superiority, 15 points difference
- PP — Won by Points, the loser with technical points
- PO — Won by Points, the loser without technical points
- P0 — Won by Passivity, scoring zero points
- P1 — Won by Passivity, while leading by 1-11 points
- PS — Won by Passivity, while leading by 12-14 points
- PA — Won by Opponent Injury
- DQ — Won by Forfeit
- DNA — Did not appear
- L — Losses
- ER — Round of Elimination
- CP — Classification Points
- TP — Technical Points

=== Eliminatory round ===
==== Group A ====
L		CP	TP		L
Round 1
0	Steve Marshall (CAN)	3-0 P1	5:43	Juha Ahokas (FIN)	1
0	Dennis Koslowski (USA)	4-0 ST	16-0	Masahiko Fukube (JPN)	1
0	Jožef Tertei (YUG)	3-0 P1	3:21	Dušan Masár (TCH)	1
0	Vasile Andrei (ROU)	3-1 PP	4-1	Guram Gedekhauri (URS)	1
0	Andrzej Wroński (POL)			Bye	
Round 2
0	Andrzej Wroński (POL)	3-0 PO	2-0	Steve Marshall (CAN)	1
2	Juha Ahokas (FIN)	0-4 ST	0-15	Dennis Koslowski (USA)	0
2	Masahiko Fukube (JPN)	0-4 ST	2-17	Jožef Tertei (YUG)	0
2	Dušan Masár (TCH)	0-3 PO	0-6	Vasile Andrei (ROU)	0
1	Guram Gedekhauri (URS)			Bye	
Round 3
1	Guram Gedekhauri (URS)	4-0 TF	3:48	Andrzej Wroński (POL)	1
2	Steve Marshall (CAN)	0-3 P1	4:51	Dennis Koslowski (USA)	0
0	Jožef Tertei (YUG)	3-0 PO	1-0	Vasile Andrei (ROU)	1
Round 4
1	Guram Gedekhauri (URS)	3-1 PP	5-4	Dennis Koslowski (USA)	1
1	Andrzej Wroński (POL)	3-0 PO	1-0	Jožef Tertei (YUG)	1
1	Vasile Andrei (ROU)			Bye	
Round 5
2	Vasile Andrei (ROU)	0-3 P1	5:50	Andrzej Wroński (POL)	1
2	Guram Gedekhauri (URS)	0-3 PO	0-4	Jožef Tertei (YUG)	1
1	Dennis Koslowski (USA)			Bye	
Final Round
Round 6
1	Dennis Koslowski (USA)	0-3 PO	0-1	Andrzej Wroński (POL)	0
1	Jožef Tertei (YUG)			Bye	
Round 7
2	Jožef Tertei (YUG)	0-3 PO	0-2	Dennis Koslowski (USA)	1
0	Andrzej Wroński (POL)			Bye	

Wrestler	L	ER	CP	Tiebreaker
Andrzej Wroński (POL)	1	-	9	6
Dennis Koslowski (USA)	1	-	12	3
Jožef Tertei (YUG)	1	-	13	0
Guram Gedekhauri (URS)	2	5	8	
Vasile Andrei (ROU)	2	5	6	
Steve Marshall (CAN)	2	3	3	
Masahiko Fukube (JPN)	2	2	0	
Juha Ahokas (FIN)	2	2	0	
Dušan Masár (TCH)	2	2	0	

==== Group B ====
L		CP	TP		L
Round 1
1	Floriano Spiess (BRA)	0-4 ST	0-15	Tamás Gáspár (HUN)	0
0	Ilia Georgiev (BUL)	4-0 TF	1:49	Ambroise Sarr (SEN)	1
0	Gerhard Himmel (FRG)	3-0 P1	5:07	Sören Claeson (SWE)	1
0	Oumar Samba Sy (MTN)	4-0 TF	1:47	Maisiba Obwoge (KEN)	1
0	Yoo Young-tae (KOR)			Bye	
Round 2
0	Yoo Young-tae (KOR)	4-0 ST	18-2	Floriano Spiess (BRA)	2
0	Tamás Gáspár (HUN)	3-1 PP	2-1	Ilia Georgiev (BUL)	1
2	Ambroise Sarr (SEN)	0-4 TF	2:57	Gerhard Himmel (FRG)	0
1	Sören Claeson (SWE)	4-0 TF	1:27	Oumar Samba Sy (MTN)	1
1	Maisiba Obwoge (KEN)			Bye	
Round 3
2	Maisiba Obwoge (KEN)	0-4 TF	0:34	Yoo Young-tae (KOR)	0
1	Tamás Gáspár (HUN)	0-4 PA	1:13	Gerhard Himmel (FRG)	0
1	Ilia Georgiev (BUL)	3.5-.5 SP	14-2	Sören Claeson (SWE)	2
1	Oumar Samba Sy (MTN)			Bye	
Round 4
1	Yoo Young-tae (KOR)	0-4 ST	0-17	Ilia Georgiev (BUL)	1
0	Gerhard Himmel (FRG)			Bye	
1	Oumar Samba Sy (MTN)			DNA	
1	Tamás Gáspár (HUN)			DNA	
Round 5
0	Gerhard Himmel (FRG)	3-0 PO	7-0	Yoo Young-tae (KOR)	2
1	Ilia Georgiev (BUL)			Bye	
Round 6
2	Ilia Georgiev (BUL)	0-3 P1	4:49	Gerhard Himmel (FRG)	0

Wrestler	L	ER	CP
Gerhard Himmel (FRG)	0	-	17
Ilia Georgiev (BUL)	2	6	12.5
Yoo Young-tae (KOR)	2	5	8
Tamás Gáspár (HUN)	1	3	7
Sören Claeson (SWE)	2	3	4.5
Oumar Samba Sy (MTN)	1	3	4
Maisiba Obwoge (KEN)	2	3	0
Floriano Spiess (BRA)	2	2	0
Ambroise Sarr (SEN)	2	2	0

=== Final round ===
	CP	TP	
7th place match
Guram Gedekhauri (URS)	4-0 PA		Tamás Gáspár (HUN)
5th place match
Jožef Tertei (YUG)	4-0 PA		Yoo Young-Tae (KOR)
Bronze medal match
Dennis Koslowski (USA)	3-0 PO	6-0	Ilia Georgiev (BUL)
Gold medal match
Andrzej Wroński (POL)	3-1 PP	3-1	Gerhard Himmel (FRG)

== Final standings ==
1. Andrzej Wroński (POL)
2. Gerhard Himmel (FRG)
3. Dennis Koslowski (USA)
4. Ilia Georgiev (BUL)
5. Jožef Tertei (YUG)
6. Yoo Young-Tae (KOR)
7. Guram Gedekhauri (URS)
8. Tamás Gáspár (HUN)
