= Wrestling at the 1984 Summer Olympics – Men's Greco-Roman 100 kg =

Men's Greco-Roman 100 kg at the Games of the XXIII Olympiad
- Venue: Anaheim Convention Center
- Dates: 1–3 August 1984
- Competitors: 8 from 8 nations

Medalists
1st place, gold medalist(s)		Vasile Andrei	Romania
2nd place, silver medalist(s)		Greg Gibson	United States
3rd place, bronze medalist(s)		Jožef Tertei	Yugoslavia

The Men's Greco-Roman 100 kg at the 1984 Summer Olympics as part of the wrestling program were held at the Anaheim Convention Center, Anaheim, California.

== Medalists ==
Gold	Vasile Andrei; Romania
Silver	Greg Gibson; United States
Bronze	Jožef Tertei; Yugoslavia

== Tournament results ==
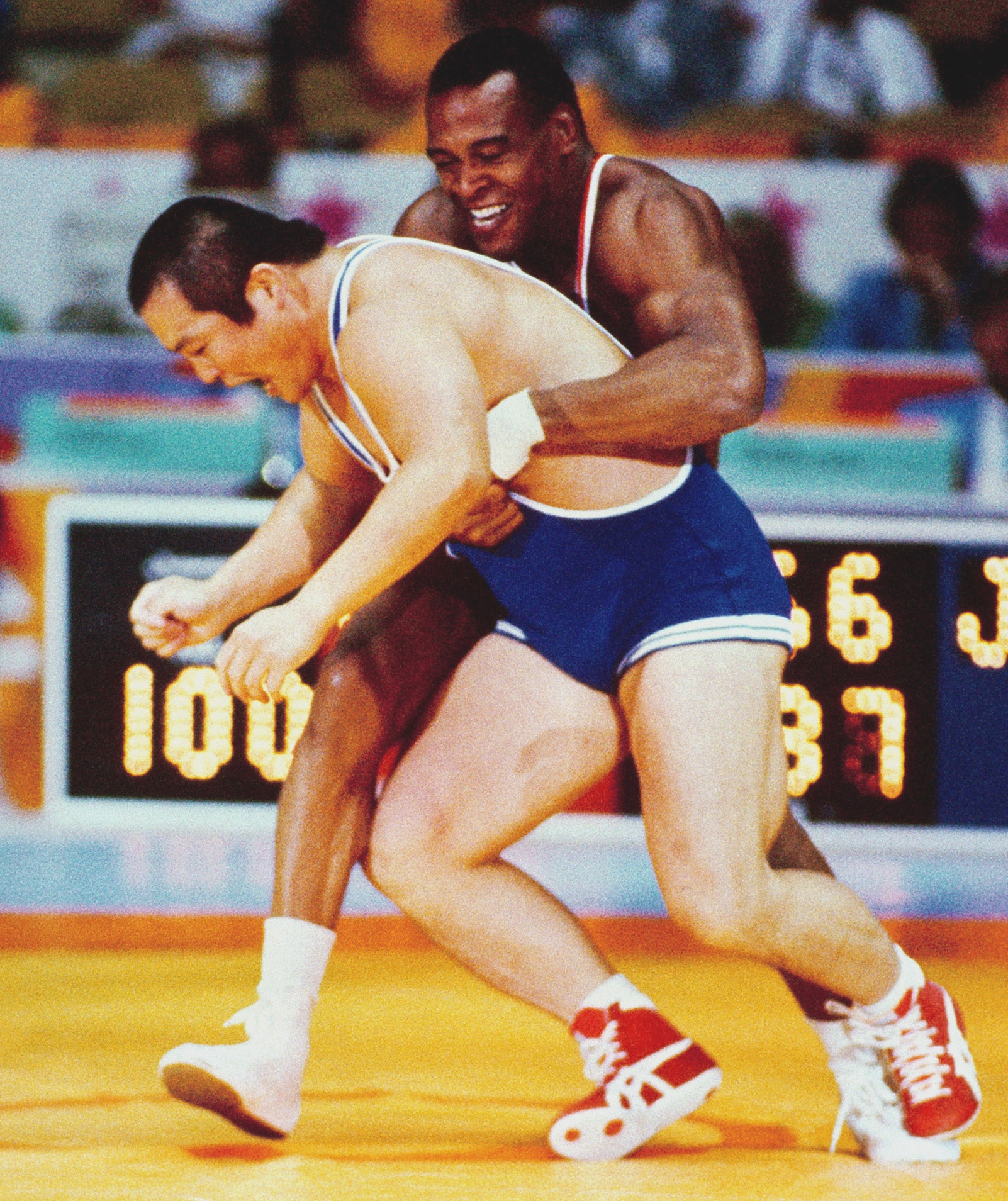
American Greg Gibson defeat Japanese Yoshihiro Fujita (blue)

The wrestlers are divided into 2 groups. The winner of each group decided by a double-elimination system.

Legend

- TF — Won by Fall
- ST — Won by Technical Superiority, 12 points difference
- PP — Won by Points, 1-7 points difference, the loser with points
- PO — Won by Points, 1-7 points difference, the loser without points
- SP — Won by Points, 8-11 points difference, the loser with points
- SO — Won by Points, 8-11 points difference, the loser without points
- P0 — Won by Passivity, scoring zero points
- P1 — Won by Passivity, while leading by 1-7 points
- PS — Won by Passivity, while leading by 8-11 points
- DC — Won by Decision, 0-0 score
- PA — Won by Opponent Injury
- DQ — Won by Forfeit
- DNA — Did not appear
- L — Losses
- ER — Round of Elimination
- CP — Classification Points
- TP — Technical Points

=== Eliminatory round ===
==== Group A ====
L		CP	TP		L
Round 1
0	Georgios Pikilidis (GRE)	3-1 PP	7-1	Franz Pitschmann (AUT)	1
1	Karl-Johan Gustavsson (SWE)	0-4 ST	0-13	Vasile Andrei (ROU)	0
Round 2
0	Georgios Pikilidis (GRE)	4-0 ST	16-1	Karl-Johan Gustavsson (SWE)	2
2	Franz Pitschmann (AUT)	0-4 ST	2-15	Vasile Andrei (ROU)	0
Final
	Georgios Pikilidis (GRE)	0-3.5 PS	4:05	Vasile Andrei (ROU)	

Wrestler	L	ER	CP	Final
Vasile Andrei (ROU)	0	-	8	3.5
Georgios Pikilidis (GRE)	0	-	7	0
Franz Pitschmann (AUT)	2	2	1	
Karl-Johan Gustavsson (SWE)	2	2	0	

==== Group B ====
L		CP	TP		L
Round 1
1	Fritz Gerdsmeier (FRG)	0-4 TF	5:39	Jožef Tertei (YUG)	0
0	Greg Gibson (USA)	4-0 ST	14-1	Yoshihiro Fujita (JPN)	1
Round 2
2	Fritz Gerdsmeier (FRG)	1-3 PP	1-6	Greg Gibson (USA)	0
0	Jožef Tertei (YUG)	4-0 TF	1:33	Yoshihiro Fujita (JPN)	2
Final
	Jožef Tertei (YUG)	1-3 PP	2-3	Greg Gibson (USA)	

Wrestler	L	ER	CP	Final
Greg Gibson (USA)	0	-	7	3
Jožef Tertei (YUG)	0	-	8	1
Fritz Gerdsmeier (FRG)	2	2	1	
Yoshihiro Fujita (JPN)	2	2	0	

=== Final round ===
	CP	TP	
5th place match
Franz Pitschmann (AUT)	3-1 PP	7-5	Fritz Gerdsmeier (FRG)
Bronze medal match
Georgios Pikilidis (GRE)	0-3 PO	0-3	Jožef Tertei (YUG)
Gold medal match
Vasile Andrei (ROU)	4-0 ST	12-0	Greg Gibson (USA)

== Final standings ==
1. Vasile Andrei (ROU)
2. Greg Gibson (USA)
3. Jožef Tertei (YUG)
4. Georgios Pikilidis (GRE)
5. Franz Pitschmann (AUT)
6. Fritz Gerdsmeier (FRG)
7. Karl-Johan Gustavsson (SWE) and Yoshihiro Fujita (JPN)
