= Wrestling at the 1984 Summer Olympics – Men's freestyle 100 kg =

Men's freestyle 100 kg at the Games of the XXIII Olympiad
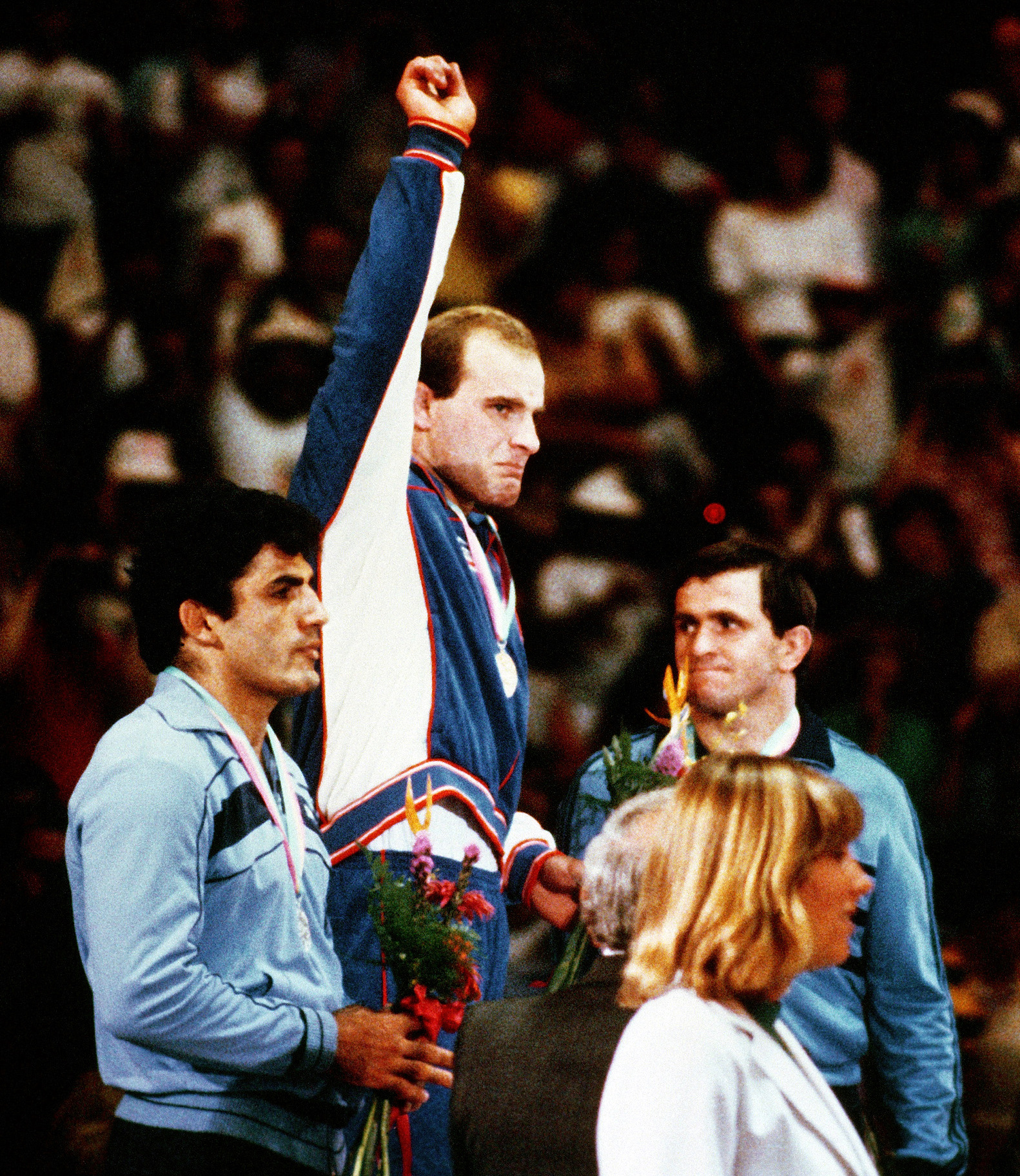
- Medal ceremony, from left: Silver medalist Joseph Atiyeh, winner Lou Banach and bronze medalist Vasile Pușcașu.
- Venue: Anaheim Convention Center
- Dates: 9–11 August 1984
- Competitors: 11 from 11 nations

Medalists
1st place, gold medalist(s)		Lou Banach	United States
2nd place, silver medalist(s)		Joseph Atiyeh	Syria
3rd place, bronze medalist(s)		Vasile Puşcaşu	Romania

The Men's Freestyle 100 kg at the 1984 Summer Olympics as part of the wrestling program were held at the Anaheim Convention Center, Anaheim, California.

== Medalists ==
Gold	Lou Banach; United States
Silver	Joseph Atiyeh; Syria
Bronze	Vasile Puşcaşu; Romania

== Tournament results ==
The wrestlers are divided into 2 groups. The winner of each group decided by a double-elimination system.

Legend

- TF — Won by Fall
- ST — Won by Technical Superiority, 12 points difference
- PP — Won by Points, 1-7 points difference, the loser with points
- PO — Won by Points, 1-7 points difference, the loser without points
- SP — Won by Points, 8-11 points difference, the loser with points
- SO — Won by Points, 8-11 points difference, the loser without points
- P0 — Won by Passivity, scoring zero points
- P1 — Won by Passivity, while leading by 1-7 points
- PS — Won by Passivity, while leading by 8-11 points
- DC — Won by Decision, 0-0 score
- PA — Won by Opponent Injury
- DQ — Won by Forfeit
- DNA — Did not appear
- L — Losses
- ER — Round of Elimination
- CP — Classification Points
- TP — Technical Points

=== Eliminatory round ===
==== Group A ====
L		CP	TP		L
Round 1
1	Karl-Johan Gustavsson (SWE)	0-4 ST	2-15	Kartar Singh (IND)	0
0	Georgios Pikilidis (GRE)	3-0 P1	4:57	Oumar Samba Sy (MTN)	1
0	Joseph Atiyeh (SYR)	4-0 TF	4:42	Vasile Puşcaşu (ROU)	1
Round 2
2	Karl-Johan Gustavsson (SWE)	0-4 ST	0-12	Georgios Pikilidis (GRE)	0
1	Kartar Singh (IND)	0-4 TF	0:33	Joseph Atiyeh (SYR)	0
1	Vasile Puşcaşu (ROU)			Bye	
1	Oumar Samba Sy (MTN)			DNA	
Round 3
1	Vasile Puşcaşu (ROU)	3-1 PP	6-5	Kartar Singh (IND)	2
1	Georgios Pikilidis (GRE)	0-4 PA	0:27	Joseph Atiyeh (SYR)	0
Final
	Joseph Atiyeh (SYR)	4-0 TF	4:42	Vasile Puşcaşu (ROU)	
	Georgios Pikilidis (GRE)	0-4 PA	0:27	Joseph Atiyeh (SYR)	
	Vasile Puşcaşu (ROU)	4-0 PA		Georgios Pikilidis (GRE)	

Wrestler	L	ER	CP	Final
Joseph Atiyeh (SYR)	0	-	12	8
Vasile Puşcaşu (ROU)	1	-	3	4
Georgios Pikilidis (GRE)	1	-	7	0
Kartar Singh (IND)	2	3	5	
Karl-Johan Gustavsson (SWE)	2	2	0	
Oumar Samba Sy (MTN)	1	1	0	

==== Group B ====
L		CP	TP		L
Round 1
1	Hayri Sezgin (TUR)	0-4 TF	1:14	Lou Banach (USA)	0
1	Ambroise Sarr (SEN)	0-4 TF	3:52	Tamon Honda (JPN)	0
0	Wayne Brightwell (CAN)			Bye	
Round 2
1	Wayne Brightwell (CAN)	1-3 PP	5-6	Hayri Sezgin (TUR)	1
0	Lou Banach (USA)	4-0 TF	1:45	Ambroise Sarr (SEN)	2
0	Tamon Honda (JPN)			Bye	
Round 3
1	Tamon Honda (JPN)	1-3 PP	4-9	Hayri Sezgin (TUR)	1
2	Wayne Brightwell (CAN)	.5-3.5 SP	1-11	Lou Banach (USA)	0
Final
	Hayri Sezgin (TUR)	0-4 TF	1:14	Lou Banach (USA)	
	Tamon Honda (JPN)	1-3 PP	4-9	Hayri Sezgin (TUR)	
	Lou Banach (USA)	4-0 TF	1:56	Tamon Honda (JPN)	

Wrestler	L	ER	CP	Final
Lou Banach (USA)	0	-	11.5	8
Hayri Sezgin (TUR)	1	-	6	3
Tamon Honda (JPN)	1	-	5	1
Wayne Brightwell (CAN)	2	3	1.5	
Ambroise Sarr (SEN)	2	2	0	

=== Final round ===
	CP	TP	
5th place match
Georgios Pikilidis (GRE)	0-4 PA		Tamon Honda (JPN)
Bronze medal match
Vasile Puşcaşu (ROU)	3-1 PP	4-3	Hayri Sezgin (TUR)
Gold medal match
Joseph Atiyeh (SYR)	0-4 TF	1:01	Lou Banach (USA)

== Final standings ==
1. Lou Banach (USA)
2. Joseph Atiyeh (SYR)
3. Vasile Puşcaşu (ROU)
4. Hayri Sezgin (TUR)
5. Tamon Honda (JPN)
6. Georgios Pikilidis (GRE)
7. Kartar Singh (IND)
8. Wayne Brightwell (CAN)
