= Wrestling at the 1988 Summer Olympics – Men's freestyle 100 kg =

Men's freestyle 100 kg at the Games of the XXIV Olympiad
- Venue: Sangmu Gymnasium
- Dates: 28–30 September 1988
- Competitors: 22 from 22 nations

Medalists
1st place, gold medalist(s)		Vasile Puşcaşu	Romania
2nd place, silver medalist(s)		Leri Khabelov	Soviet Union
3rd place, bronze medalist(s)		William Scherr	United States

The Men's Freestyle 100 kg at the 1988 Summer Olympics as part of the wrestling program were held at the Sangmu Gymnasium, Seongnam.

== Medalists ==
Gold	Vasile Puşcaşu; Romania
Silver	Leri Khabelov; Soviet Union
Bronze	William Scherr; United States

== Tournament results ==
The wrestlers are divided into 2 groups. The winner of each group decided by a double-elimination system.

Legend

- TF — Won by Fall
- SP — Won by Superiority, 12-14 points difference, the loser with points
- SO — Won by Superiority, 12-14 points difference, the loser without points
- ST — Won by Technical Superiority, 15 points difference
- PP — Won by Points, the loser with technical points
- PO — Won by Points, the loser without technical points
- P0 — Won by Passivity, scoring zero points
- P1 — Won by Passivity, while leading by 1-11 points
- PS — Won by Passivity, while leading by 12-14 points
- PA — Won by Opponent Injury
- DQ — Won by Forfeit
- DNA — Did not appear
- L — Losses
- ER — Round of Elimination
- CP — Classification Points
- TP — Technical Points

=== Eliminatory round ===
==== Group A ====
L		CP	TP		L
Round 1
1	Joe Byung-eun (KOR)	1-3 PP	3-5	Boldyn Javkhlantögs (MGL)	0
0	Kartar Singh (IND)	3-1 PP	3-2	Tamon Honda (JPN)	1
0	Uwe Neupert (GDR)	4-0 TF	0:56	Floriano Spiess (BRA)	1
0	Hayri Sezgin (TUR)	4-0 TF	1:42	Jackson Bidei (NGR)	1
1	Fred Solovi (SAM)	0-4 TF	2:42	Leri Khabelov (URS)	0
0	Clark Davis (CAN)			Bye	
Round 2
1	Clark Davis (CAN)	1-3 PP	2-6	Joe Byung-eun (KOR)	1
0	Boldyn Javkhlantögs (MGL)	3-0 P1	4:27	Kartar Singh (IND)	1
2	Tamon Honda (JPN)	0-4 TF	1:53	Uwe Neupert (GDR)	0
1	Floriano Spiess (BRA)	3-1 PP	11-7	Fred Solovi (SAM)	2
1	Hayri Sezgin (TUR)	1-3 PP	2-9	Leri Khabelov (URS)	0
1	Jackson Bidei (NGR)			DNA	
Round 3
2	Clark Davis (CAN)	1-3 PP	3-8	Boldyn Javkhlantögs (MGL)	0
1	Joe Byung-eun (KOR)	4-0 ST	16-1	Kartar Singh (IND)	2
0	Uwe Neupert (GDR)	3-1 PP	5-3	Hayri Sezgin (TUR)	2
2	Floriano Spiess (BRA)	0-4 TF	3:45	Leri Khabelov (URS)	0
Round 4
2	Joe Byung-eun (KOR)	0-4 TF	1:16	Uwe Neupert (GDR)	0
1	Boldyn Javkhlantögs (MGL)	0-4 TF	1:50	Leri Khabelov (URS)	0
Round 5
2	Boldyn Javkhlantögs (MGL)	0-4 TF	1:48	Uwe Neupert (GDR)	0
0	Leri Khabelov (URS)			Bye	
Round 6
0	Leri Khabelov (URS)	3-1 PP	3-1	Uwe Neupert (GDR)	1

Wrestler	L	ER	CP
Leri Khabelov (URS)	0	-	18
Uwe Neupert (GDR)	1	-	20
Boldyn Javkhlantögs (MGL)	2	6	9
Joe Byung-eun (KOR)	2	4	8
Hayri Sezgin (TUR)	2	3	6
Floriano Spiess (BRA)	2	3	3
Kartar Singh (IND)	2	3	3
Clark Davis (CAN)	2	3	2
Fred Solovi (SAM)	2	2	1
Tamon Honda (JPN)	2	2	1
Jackson Bidei (NGR)	1	1	0

==== Group B ====
L		CP	TP		L
Round 1
0	Georgi Karadushev (BUL)	3-0 PO	2-0	Wilfried Colling (FRG)	1
0	Vasile Puşcaşu (ROU)	4-0 TF	1:08	Maisiba Obwoge (KEN)	1
0	Babacar Sar (MTN)	4-0 TF	2:16	Alesana Sione (ASA)	1
1	István Robotka (HUN)	0-3 PO	0-8	Noel Loban (GBR)	0
1	Wojciech Wala (POL)	0-4 TF	5:26	William Scherr (USA)	0
0	Július Strnisko (TCH)			Bye	
Round 2
1	Július Strnisko (TCH)	1-3 PP	1-7	Georgi Karaduchev (BUL)	0
2	Wilfried Colling (FRG)	0-3 PO	0-4	Vasile Puşcaşu (ROU)	0
2	Maisiba Obwoge (KEN)	0-4 TF	2:59	Babacar Sar (MTN)	0
2	Alesana Sione (ASA)	0-4 DQ		István Robotka (HUN)	1
0	Noel Loban (GBR)	3-1 PP	11-2	Wojciech Wala (POL)	2
0	William Scherr (USA)			Bye	
Round 3
0	William Scherr (USA)	3-1 PP	11-3	Július Strnisko (TCH)	2
1	Georgi Karaduchev (BUL)	1-3 PP	3-7	Vasile Puşcaşu (ROU)	0
1	Babacar Sar (MTN)	0-4 TF	0:22	István Robotka (HUN)	1
0	Noel Loban (GBR)			Bye	
Round 4
1	Noel Loban (GBR)	1-3 PP	2-5	William Scherr (USA)	0
1	Georgi Karaduchev (BUL)	4-0 TF	0:47	Babacar Sar (MTN)	2
0	Vasile Puşcaşu (ROU)	3-1 PP	5-4	István Robotka (HUN)	2
Round 5
2	Noel Loban (GBR)	1-3 PP	3-5	Georgi Karaduchev (BUL)	1
1	William Scherr (USA)	1-3 PP	1-4	Vasile Puşcaşu (ROU)	0
Round 6
1	William Scherr (USA)	3-1 PP	6-1	Georgi Karaduchev (BUL)	2
0	Vasile Puşcaşu (ROU)			Bye	

Wrestler	L	ER	CP
Vasile Puşcaşu (ROU)	0	-	16
William Scherr (USA)	1	-	14
Georgi Karaduchev (BUL)	2	6	15
Noel Loban (GBR)	2	5	8
István Robotka (HUN)	2	4	9
Babacar Sar (MTN)	2	4	8
Július Strnisko (TCH)	2	3	2
Wojciech Wala (POL)	2	2	1
Alesana Sione (ASA)	2	2	0
Maisiba Obwoge (KEN)	2	2	0
Wilfried Colling (FRG)	2	2	0

=== Final round ===
	CP	TP	
7th place match
Joe Byung-eun (KOR)	0-4 PA		Noel Loban (GBR)
5th place match
Boldyn Javkhlantögs (MGL)	0-4 TF	1:32	Georgi Karaduchev (BUL)
Bronze medal match
Uwe Neupert (GDR)	0-4 TF	3:31	William Scherr (USA)
Gold medal match
Leri Khabelov (URS)	0-3 PO	0-1	Vasile Puşcaşu (ROU)

== Final standings ==
1. Vasile Puşcaşu (ROU)
2. Leri Khabelov (URS)
3. William Scherr (USA)
4. Uwe Neupert (GDR)
5. Georgi Karaduchev (BUL)
6. Boldyn Javkhlantögs (MGL)
7. Noel Loban (GBR)
8. Joe Byung-eun (KOR)
