= Yoshihiro Fujita =

Yoshihiro Fujita may refer to:

- Yoshihiro Fujita (fighter) (born 1969), Japanese mixed martial artist
- Yoshihiro Fujita (wrestler) (born 1952), Japanese Greco-Roman wrestler
