= Shigeyuki Aikyo =

Japanese track and field athlete (born 1964)

Personal information
- Nationality: Japanese
- Born: 29 January 1964 (age 62) Kuwana, Mie, Japan
- Education: Chukyo University

Sport
- Country: Japan
- Sport: Track and field
- Event: 3000 metres steeplechase
- Personal best: 8:31.27 (1983)
Medal record
Men's athletics
Representing Japan
Asian Games
Gold medal – first place	1986 Seoul	3000 m s'chase
Asian Championships
Gold medal – first place	1985 Jakarta	3000 m s'chase
Universiade
Bronze medal – third place	1983 Edmonton	3000 m s'chase
Bronze medal – third place	1987 Zagreb	3000 m s'chase

Shigeyuki Aikyo (Japanese: 愛敬 重之; born 29 January 1964) is a Japanese former track and field athlete who specialised in the 3000 metres steeplechase. He was the gold medallist at the 1986 Asian Games and the 1985 Asian Athletics Championships. He was also a two-time Universiade bronze medallist and a two-time national champion.

Aikyo was Asia's only steeplechase competitor at the World Championships in Athletics in both 1983 and 1987. He competed for Asia at the 1985 IAAF World Cup. His personal best of 8:31.27 minutes was a Japanese junior national record until it was broken by Ryuji Miura in 2020.

== Career ==
Aikyo emerged as a teenage athlete in the 1983 season. Still studying at university, he was eligible for the Universiade that year and managed to finish in third place behind Peter Daenens and Farley Gerber. He was chosen to represent Japan at the inaugural 1983 World Championships in Athletics. The only Asian entrant in the event, he ran a time of 8:31.27 minutes to progress beyond the heat stage. This time was a new Japanese junior (under-20) record – one which, as of 2015, still stands in the record books. He was a little slower in the semi-finals and was eliminated in eleventh place.

He did not qualify for the 1984 Summer Olympics and his next international outings were in 1985. At the 1985 Asian Athletics Championships he became the third Japanese man to lift the steeplechase title, finishing half a second ahead of Taiwan's defending champion Hwang Wen-Cheng to match the feat of Takaharu Koyama and Masanari Shintaku. This earned him the honour of being Asia's representative in the event at the 1985 IAAF World Cup. At the event in Canberra, he finished well down the field, coming last in eighth place with a time of 8:55.35 minutes (well short of his best). The following year he won his first national title at the Japan Championships in Athletics. He became a double reigning continental champion through a gold medal-winning performance at the 1986 Asian Games. His time of 8:36.98 minutes was an Asian Games record. He made it a sixth consecutive win for Japan in that event, which dated back to Taketsugu Saruwatari's 1966 win.

Aikyo had his second and final win at the Japan Championships in 1987. He ran at the 1987 World Championships in Athletics, where again he was the only Asian entrant in the men's steeplechase. He fell short of his 1983 form and ended the competition in tenth in the heats with a run of 8:41.41 minutes. He also competed at the 1987 Universiade that year. In a close sprint finish, Aikyo was overhauled by Valeriy Vandyak in the final metres and ultimately ended up with the bronze medal behind the Soviet runner and Cuba's Juan Ramón Conde, repeating his finish of four years earlier.

His last major appearance was a fourth-place finish at the 1991 Asian Athletics Championships, beaten to a medal by Syria's Saleh Mohammed Habib. In his later career he moved off the track and into long-distance road running competitions. He was fourth at the 1992 Himeji Castle 10-Miler, but had little success elsewhere.

He is a city councillor of Kuwana from 2010.

== Personal life ==
His family is also a track and field athlete. His father Minoru was the Japanese national university champion in the 3000 metres steeplechase and the former Japanese national university record holder (9:12.2 minutes). His daughter Sena and Maya was the 2005 Japanese national junior high school champion in the 4 × 100 metres relay. His son Shotaro was the 2011 World Youth Championships silver medallist in the medley relay and the former Japanese national record holder (1:22.12 minutes) in the 4 × 200 metres relay.

== Personal best ==
- 3000 metres steeplechase: 8:31.27 (Helsinki 1983) - Former Japanese national junior record

== National titles ==
- Japan Championships in Athletics
  - 3000 m steeplechase: 1986, 1987

== International competitions ==
Year	Competition	Venue	Position	Event	Notes
1983	Universiade	Edmonton, Canada	3rd	3000 m s'chase	8:33.44
1983	World Championships	Helsinki, Finland	11th (semis)	3000 m s'chase	8:33.29
1985	Asian Championships	Jakarta, Indonesia	1st	3000 m s'chase	8:46.96
1985	World Cup	Canberra, Australia	8th	3000 m s'chase	8:55.35
1986	Asian Games	Seoul, South Korea	1st	3000 m s'chase	8:36.98 GR
1987	Universiade	Zagreb, Yugoslavia	3rd	3000 m s'chase	8:34.23
1987	World Championships	Rome, Italy	10th (heats)	3000 m s'chase	8:41.41
1991	Asian Championships	Kuala Lumpur, Malaysia	4th	3000 m s'chase	8:35.10
