= Athletics at the 1985 Summer Universiade – Men's 5000 metres =

The men's 5000 metres event at the 1985 Summer Universiade was held at the Kobe Universiade Memorial Stadium in Kobe on 3 and 4 September 1985.

== Medalists ==
Gold	Silver	Bronze
Stefano Mei; Italy	Carey Nelson; Canada	Rob Lonergan; Canada

== Results ==
=== Heats ===
Rank	Heat	Athlete	Nationality	Time	Notes
1	1	Rob Lonergan	Canada	13:57.71	Q
2	1	Stefano Mei	Italy	13:58.41	Q
3	1	Shuichi Yoneshige	Japan	13:58.76	Q
4	1	Alan Guilder	Great Britain	13:59.24	Q
5	1	Adauto Domingues	Brazil	13:59.96	Q
6	1	Rob de Brouwer	Netherlands	14:01.12	Q
7	1	Danny Henderson	United States	14:03.17	q
8	1	Larbi El Mouadden	Morocco	14:03.66	q
9	2	James Sapienza	United States	14:05.30	Q
10	2	Tsukasa Endo	Japan	14:05.36	Q
11	1	Michael Scheytt	West Germany	14:05.45	q
12	2	Carey Nelson	Canada	14:06.93	Q
13	2	Emmanouel Hatzos	Greece	14:07.24	Q
14	2	João Campos	Portugal	14:07.63	Q
15	2	Walter Merlo	Italy	14:08.31	Q
16	2	Roberto López	Mexico	14:11.17	q
17	2	Hugo Allan García	Guatemala	14:15.70	
18	2	Argimiro Domínguez	Spain	14:26.35	
19	2	Mark Scrutton	Great Britain	14:33.52	
20	2	Mohamed Salmi	Algeria	14:39.73	
21	2	George Mambosasa	Malawi	14:43.57	
22	1	Luis Mena	Costa Rica	15:00.99	
23	2	Thierry Payet	Seychelles	15:51.04	
	1	Joaquim Silva	Portugal	DNF	
	2	Manuel Miranda	Bolivia	DNF	

=== Final ===
Rank	Athlete	Nationality	Time	Notes
1st place, gold medalist(s)	Stefano Mei	Italy	13:56.48	
2nd place, silver medalist(s)	Carey Nelson	Canada	13:57.77	
3rd place, bronze medalist(s)	Rob Lonergan	Canada	13:58.02	
4	Tsukasa Endo	Japan	13:58.36	
5	James Sapienza	United States	14:01.22	
6	Shuichi Yoneshige	Japan	14:04.64	
7	Adauto Domingues	Brazil	14:06.46	
8	Alan Guilder	Great Britain	14:07.96	
9	Emmanuel Handzos	Greece	14:11.37	
10	Michael Scheytt	West Germany	14:13.96	
11	Rob de Brouwer	Netherlands	14:17.56	
12	Larbi El-Mouadden	Morocco	14:29.77	
	João Campos	Portugal	DNF	
	Danny Henderson	United States	DNF	
	Walter Merlo	Italy	DNF	
