= Dušan Masár =

Czech wrestler

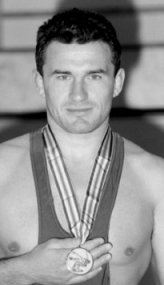

Personal information
- Nationality: Czech
- Born: 4 June 1962 (age 64) Teplice nad Bečvou, Czechoslovakia

Sport
- Sport: Wrestling

Dušan Masár (born 4 June 1962) is a Czech former wrestler. He competed in the men's Greco-Roman 100 kg at the 1988 Summer Olympics.
