= Vasile Pușcașu =

Romanian freestyle wrestler (born 1956)

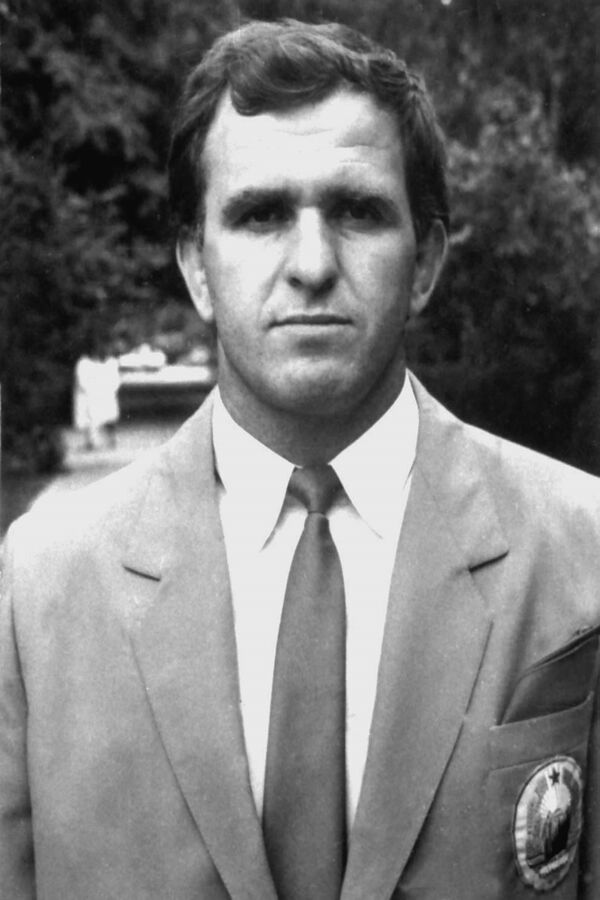
- Pușcașu in 1988

Personal information
- Born: 2 May 1956 (age 70) Bârsăneşti, Bacău County, Romania
- Height: 185 cm (6 ft 1 in)

Sport
- Sport: Freestyle wrestling
- Club: Steaua București
Medal record
Representing Romania
Olympic Games
Gold medal – first place	1988 Seoul	100 kg
Bronze medal – third place	1984 Los Angeles	100 kg
World Championships
Silver medal – second place	1987 Clermont-Ferrand	100 kg
Bronze medal – third place	1977 Lausanne	100 kg
Bronze medal – third place	1979 San Diego	100 kg
European Championships
Silver medal – second place	1987 Veliko Tarnovo	100 kg
Bronze medal – third place	1978 Sofia	100 kg
Bronze medal – third place	1979 Bucharest	100 kg
Summer Universiade
Bronze medal – third place	1977 Sofia	100 kg

Vasile Puşcaşu (born 2 May 1956) is a retired heavyweight freestyle wrestler from Romania. He has competed at the 1980, 1984 and 1988 Olympics and won two medals: a gold in 1988 and a bronze in 1984. He also won two silver and four bronze medals at the world and European championships between 1977 and 1987.
