= Albești, Ialomița =

Albești
- Commune
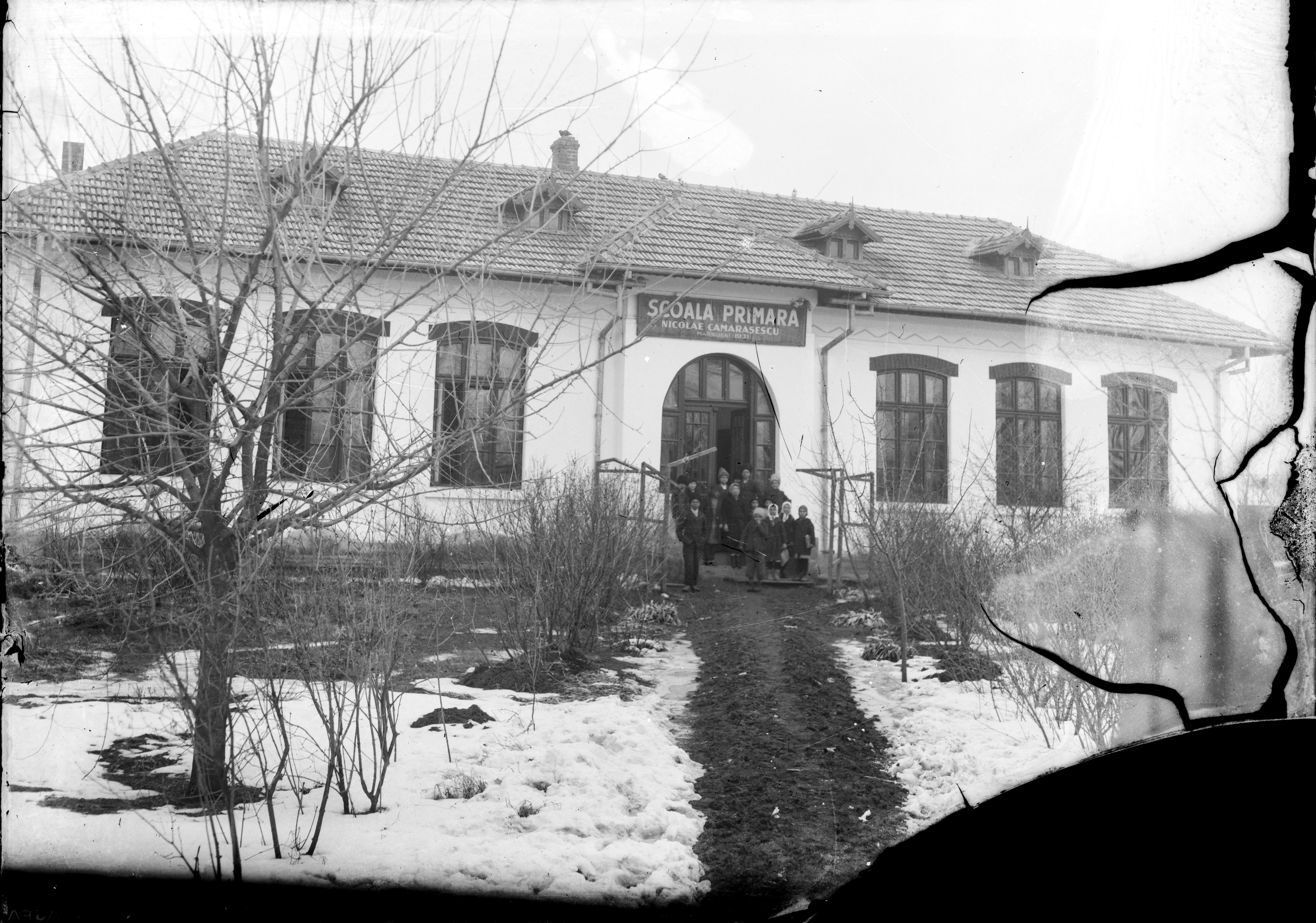
- School in Marsilieni

- Location in Ialomița County

- Location in Romania
- Coordinates: 44°32′N 27°8′E
- Country: Romania
- County: Ialomița

Government
  - Mayor (2020–2024): Emil Jugănaru (PSD)
- Elevation: 35 m (115 ft)
- Population (2021-12-01): 1,056
- Time zone: UTC+02:00 (EET)
  - Summer (DST): UTC+03:00 (EEST)
- Postal code: 927010
- Area code: +(40) x43
- Vehicle reg.: IL
- Website: primariaalbesti.ro

Albești is a commune located in Ialomița County, Muntenia, Romania. It is composed of three villages: Albești, Bataluri, and Marsilieni.

The commune lies in the Bărăgan Plain, at an altitude of 35 m (115 ft). It is located in the southern part of Ialomița County, 22 km (14 mi) west of the county seat, Slobozia, on the border with Călărași County.

Historical population
Year	Pop.	±%
1899	2,561	—
1925	2,295	−10.4%
2002	1,509	−34.2%
2011	1,288	−14.6%
2021	1,056	−18.0%
Source: Census data

== Natives ==
- Vasile Andrei (born 1955), heavyweight wrestler
