= Athletics at the 1987 Summer Universiade – Men's 10,000 metres =

International sporting competition

The men's 10,000 metres event at the 1987 Summer Universiade was held at the Stadion Maksimir in Zagreb on 15 July 1987.

== Results ==
Rank	Athlete	Nationality	Time	Notes
1st place, gold medalist(s)	Axel Krippschock	East Germany	29:07.02	
2nd place, silver medalist(s)	Spyridon Andriopoulos	Greece	29:08.65	
3rd place, bronze medalist(s)	Pat Porter	United States	29:20.95	
4	Mikhail Khramov	Soviet Union	29:35.70	
5	James Sapienza	United States	29:36.46	
6	Viktor Gural	Soviet Union	30:03.55	
7	James Harrison	Australia	30:16.95	
8	Marco Gozzano	Italy	30:40.40	
9	Hugo Allan García	Guatemala	30:46.84	
10	Byron Vargas	Honduras	31:03.32	
11	Ryu Ok Hyon	North Korea	31:20.76	
12	Stanislav Rozman	Yugoslavia	31:20.94	
13	Metin Değirmenci	Turkey	32:22.53	
14	Samuel Opolot	Uganda	32:54.18	
15	Abdullah Youssef	Jordan	32:55.96	
16	Gian Luigi Macina	San Marino	33:17.56	
	Andy Bristow	Great Britain	DNF	
	Faiz Didin	Jordan	DNF	
	Mohamed Rizgalla	Sudan	DNF	
	Salvatore Nicosia	Italy	DNF	
	James Njeru	Kenya	DNF	
	Suedi Abdallah	Tanzania	DNF	
