= Steve Marshall (wrestler) =

Canadian wrestler (born 1960)

Personal information
- Full name: Stephen Marshall
- Born: 13 April 1960 (age 66) New Westminster, British Columbia, Canada
- Height: 185 cm (6 ft 1 in)
- Weight: 100 kg (220 lb)

Sport
- Country: Canada
- Sport: Wrestling

Stephen Marshall (born 13 April 1960) is a Canadian wrestler. He competed in the men's Greco-Roman 100 kg at the 1988 Summer Olympics.
