= Gerhard Himmel =

German wrestler (born 1965)

Medal record

Men's Greco-Roman wrestling

Representing West Germany

Olympic Games
Silver medal – second place	1988 Seoul	100 kg

Gerhard Himmel (born 12 May 1965) is a German former wrestler who competed in the 1988 Summer Olympics. He was born in Hanau. He now works as head of procurement at Evonik Oxeno.
