= Athletics at the 1985 Summer Universiade – Men's 3000 metres steeplechase =

The men's 3000 metres steeplechase event at the 1985 Summer Universiade was held at the Kobe Universiade Memorial Stadium in Kobe on 2 September 1985.

== Results ==
Rank	Athlete	Nationality	Time	Notes
1st place, gold medalist(s)	Franco Boffi	Italy	8:28.75	
2nd place, silver medalist(s)	Eddie Wedderburn	Great Britain	8:28.90	
3rd place, bronze medalist(s)	Hans Koeleman	Netherlands	8:32.19	
4	Adauto Domingues	Brazil	8:32.97	NR
5	Farley Gerber	United States	8:34.60	
6	Shigeyaki Aiyko	Japan	8:35.10	
7	Patrick Sang	Kenya	8:38.53	
8	Hugo Allan García	Guatemala	8:46.45	NR
9	Benoît Saurette	Canada	8:48.68	
10	Timo Halonen	Finland	8:52.96	
11	Henryk Jankowski	Poland	8:53.27	
12	Mohamed Salmi	Algeria	8:55.00	
13	James Cooper	United States	9:04.50	
14	Hideki Mieda	Japan	9:23.72	
	Philippe Laheurte	Canada	DNF	
