= Alesana Sione =

American weightlifter

Personal information
- Born: July 28, 1966 (age 59)
- Height: 1.88 m (6 ft 2 in)
- Weight: 127 kg (280 lb)

Sport
- Country: American Samoa
- Sport: Weightlifting, Wrestling

Alesana Sione (born July 28, 1966) is an Olympic weightlifter and wrestler from American Samoa.

Sione competed at the 1988 Summer Olympics in the wrestling 100 kg, but he lost both of his preliminary matches so did not advance to the next round. Twelve years later at the 2000 Summer Olympics he competed in the weightlifting 105 kg and came 20th out of the 24 starters.
