= Athletics at the 1983 Summer Universiade – Men's 3000 metres steeplechase =

The men's 3000 metres steeplechase event at the 1983 Summer Universiade was held at the Commonwealth Stadium in Edmonton, Canada on 6 and 8 July 1983.

== Medalists ==
Gold	Silver	Bronze
Peter Daenens; Belgium	Farley Gerber; United States	Shigeyuki Aikyo; Japan

== Results ==
=== Heats ===
Rank	Heat	Athlete	Nationality	Time	Notes
1	2	Ivan Konovalov	Soviet Union	8:40.03	Q
2	2	Farley Gerber	United States	8:41.19	Q
3	1	Ricky Pittman	United States	8:44.89	Q
4	1	Shigeyuki Aikyo	Japan	8:45.39	Q
5	2	Peter Daenens	Belgium	8:46.61	Q
6	1	Torsten Tiller	West Germany	8:49.85	Q
7	2	Hamid Homada	Morocco	8:49.99	Q
8	1	Giovanni Modesto	Italy	8:52.49	Q
9	2	Mark Adam	Canada	8:54.38	q
10	1	Vern Iwancin	Canada	8:55.31	q
11	2	Francisco Silva	Mexico	8:57.56	
12	2	Michele Cinà	Italy	9:02.79	
13	1	César Pérez	Puerto Rico	9:08.54	
14	1	Hugo Allan García	Guatemala	9:14.11	
	1	David Abura-Ogwang	Uganda	DNF	

=== Final ===
Rank	Athlete	Nationality	Time	Notes
1st place, gold medalist(s)	Peter Daenens	Belgium	8:28.86	
2nd place, silver medalist(s)	Farley Gerber	United States	8:29.07	
3rd place, bronze medalist(s)	Shigeyuki Aikyo	Japan	8:33.44	
4	Torsten Tiller	West Germany	8:39.52	
5	Ricky Pittman	United States	8:41.95	
6	Ivan Konovalov	Soviet Union	8:44.95	
7	Mark Adam	Canada	8:45.99	
8	Giovanni Modesto	Italy	8:51.92	
9	Hamid Homada	Morocco	8:57.01	
10	Vern Iwancin	Canada	9:14.78	
