= Athletics at the 1989 Summer Universiade – Men's 3000 metres steeplechase =

The men's 3000 metres steeplechase event at the 1989 Summer Universiade was held at the Wedaustadion in Duisburg on 26 and 28 August 1989.

== Medalists ==
Gold	Silver	Bronze
Patrick Sang; Kenya	Engelbert Franz; West Germany	Thierry Brusseau; France

== Results ==
=== Heats ===
Rank	Heat	Athlete	Nationality	Time	Notes
1	1	Adauto Domingues	Brazil	8:38.25	Q
2	1	Mark Coogan	United States	8:38.68	Q
3	1	Vule Maksimović	Yugoslavia	8:38.89	Q
4	1	Atle Næsheim	Norway	8:39.66	Q
5	1	Thierry Brusseau	France	8:39.73	Q
6	1	Arto Kuusisto	Finland	8:39.88	q
7	2	Patrick Sang	Kenya	8:40.38	Q
8	1	Dmitriy Ryzhukhin	Soviet Union	8:40.47	q
9	2	Kazuhito Yamada	Japan	8:41.12	Q
10	2	Engelbert Franz	West Germany	8:41.16	Q
11	2	Antonios Vouzis	Greece	8:42.07	Q
12	2	Valeriy Vandyak	Soviet Union	8:43.23	Q
13	2	Jörgen Salo	Finland	8:43.86	q
14	2	José César Sánchez	Spain	8:46.15	q
15	1	Andreas Fischer	West Germany	8:46.72	q
16	2	Morten Ronnekleiv	Norway	8:46.72	
17	2	Richard Cooper	United States	8:49.05	
18	1	Azzedine Sakhri	Algeria	8:52.28	
19	2	Adalberto Vélez	Mexico	9:02.02	

=== Final ===
Rank	Athlete	Nationality	Time	Notes
1st place, gold medalist(s)	Patrick Sang	Kenya	8:32.78	
2nd place, silver medalist(s)	Engelbert Franz	West Germany	8:33.25	
3rd place, bronze medalist(s)	Thierry Brusseau	France	8:35.78	
4	Kazuhito Yamada	Japan	8:38.76	
5	Mark Coogan	United States	8:41.20	
6	Dmitriy Ryzhukhin	Soviet Union	8:41.33	
7	Valeriy Vandyak	Soviet Union	8:41.36	
8	Vule Maksimović	Yugoslavia	8:41.57	
9	Atle Næsheim	Norway	8:43.24	
10	Arto Kuusisto	Finland	8:46.17	
11	Adauto Domingues	Brazil	8:46.58	
12	Jörgen Salo	Finland	8:49.32	
13	José César Sánchez	Spain	8:50.80	
14	Andreas Fischer	West Germany	8:58.07	
	Antonios Vouzis	Greece	DNS	
