= Guram Gedekhauri =

Soviet wrestler (born 1963)

Personal information
- Nationality: Soviet
- Born: 24 October 1963 (age 62) Sartichala, Georgia

Sport
- Sport: Wrestling
- Weight class: 100 kg
Medal record
Men's Greco-Roman wrestling
Representing Soviet Union
World Championships
Gold medal – first place	1987 Clermont-Ferrand	100 kg
World Cup
Gold medal – first place	1987 Albany	100 kg

Guram Gedekhauri (born 24 October 1963) is a Soviet wrestler. He competed in the men's Greco-Roman 100 kg at the 1988 Summer Olympics.

Gedekhauri is the father of Zurabi Gedekhauri who is also a Greco-Roman wrestler.
