= Lou Banach =

American athlete (born 1960)

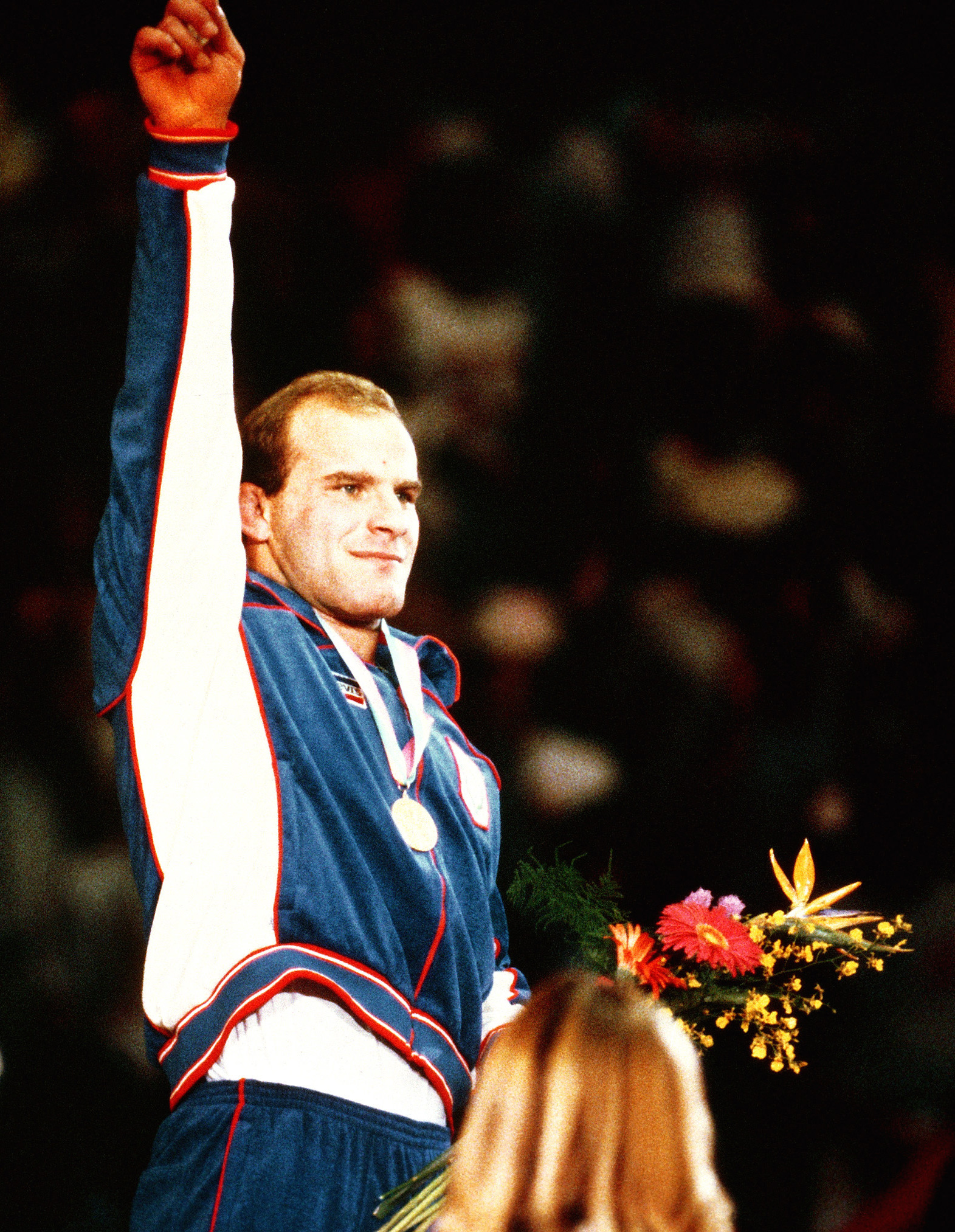
- Banach in 1984

Personal information
- Full name: Ludwig David Banach
- Born: February 6, 1960 (age 66) Sussex County, New Jersey, U.S.
- Home town: Port Jervis, New York, U.S.
- Height: 6 ft 0 in (183 cm)
- Weight: 209 lb (95 kg)

Sport
- Country: United States
- Sport: Wrestling
- Events: Freestyle and Folkstyle
- College team: Iowa
- Club: U.S. Army and Hawkeye Wrestling Club
- Team: USA
- Coached by: Dan Gable
Medal record
Men's freestyle wrestling
Representing the United States
Olympic Games
Gold medal – first place	1984 Los Angeles	100 kg
Collegiate Wrestling
Representing the Iowa Hawkeyes
NCAA Division I Championships
Gold medal – first place	1981 Princeton	Heavyweight
Gold medal – first place	1983 Oklahoma City	Heavyweight
Bronze medal – third place	1982 Ames	Heavyweight
Big Ten Championships
Gold medal – first place	1981 Madison	Heavyweight
Gold medal – first place	1983 Iowa City	Heavyweight
Silver medal – second place	1982 Ann Arbor	Heavyweight

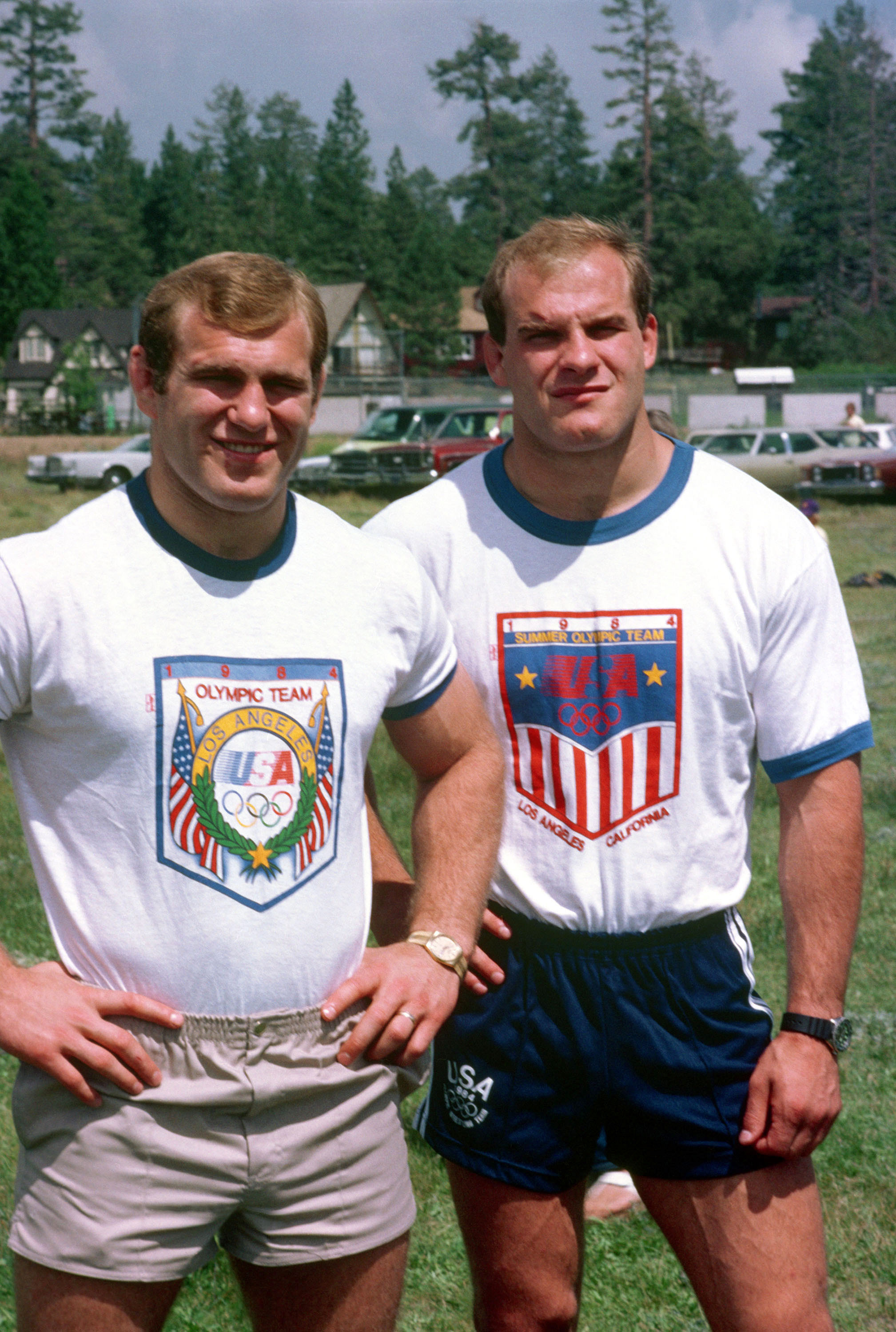
Lou Banach (right) with his twin brother Ed Banach (left), August 1984

Ludwig David "Lou" Banach (born February 6, 1960) is an American athlete who won a gold medal in wrestling in the 1984 Summer Olympics in Los Angeles. He was noted with his fraternal twin brother Ed Banach for both winning gold medals in freestyle wrestling at the same Olympics.

After earning a master's in business degree at Pennsylvania State University in 1988, Banach has had a career as a banker based in Milwaukee, Wisconsin. Since 2010 he has been a segment leader for Associated Bank of Green Bay.

== Early life and education ==
Lou and Ed Banach are fraternal twin brothers born in Sussex County, New Jersey, sons of Warclaw and Genevieve Banach, immigrants from Poland and Germany, respectively. They have an older brother Steve, born in 1959. Their biological family of 16 was separated when they were young, after their house was destroyed in a fire. Their mother suffered a nervous breakdown, and the children had to be put in foster care.

The twins and their brother Steve were all adopted in the early 1970s by Alan and Stephanie Tooley of Montague, New Jersey. The family moved to Port Jervis, New York, where the three boys all became involved in football and wrestling in high school. The twins were established as the best wrestlers in Port Jervis history by the time they graduated in 1978.

The twins both were recruited by Dan Gable and went to the University of Iowa on wrestling scholarships the fall of 1978. Lou Banach won NCAA championships in 1981 and 1983. His overall collegiate record was 92-14-3. He was enrolled in ROTC during college.

Lou Banach holds a bachelor's degree in Management and Communications from the University of Iowa and earned his MBA in Finance/Accounting with honors from Penn State University.

== Olympic gold ==
In 1984, Lou won a gold medal in Freestyle Wrestling in the 220-pound-weight (light heavyweight) class at the 1984 Summer Olympic Games in Los Angeles, California. His brother Ed Banach won a gold medal in the 198-pound-class. In that same Olympiad, American brothers Dave and Mark Schultz also both won gold medals in wrestling events. Wrestling at lower weight classes than the Banachs, the Schultzes became the first American brothers to win gold medals in the same Olympics in wrestling. However, the Banach brothers have the distinction of being the first American TWIN brothers to win the gold medal in the same Olympics in wrestling.

== Career ==
After his wrestling career, Banach entered active duty in the army as a second lieutenant. Following his management role during the day, he helped coach at the United States Military Academy at West Point.

He went on to professional studies, earning a master's degree in business administration at Penn State University. In 1988, he started his banking career at National City Bank (now PNC) in Cleveland, Ohio.

He and his wife decided they wanted to live in Milwaukee, where Banach was hired at Norwest (Wells Fargo) Bank. His early banking experiences included asset based and cash-flow lending. Before his current role at Associated Bank, he served for seven years as senior vice president and deputy regional manager for a super regional bank's Milwaukee office. He worked with business customers to finance mergers and acquisitions.

In 2010 he joined Associated Bank (based in Green Bay) as group senior vice president of commercial banking for southeast Wisconsin, dealing with businesses in the $10 million to $100 million annual sales range. Today, he manages two specialized banking teams across numerous Midwest states.

== Marriage and family ==
Banach, his wife Kim and their three children reside in the Milwaukee area.

== Honors ==
- In 1994 Banach was inducted into the National Wrestling Hall of Fame.
- In 2002 Banach was inducted into the University of Iowa Athletics Hall of Fame.
- In 2010 Banach was inducted into the Port Jervis, NY High school Hall of Fame.
- Port Jervis, New York installed a blue-and-gold sign in town honoring Ed and Lou Banach as Olympic champions.
- Banach is the author of two books: The New Breed:Living Iowa Wrestling and Uncommon Bonds: A Journey in Optimism.

== See also ==
List of Pennsylvania State University Olympians
