= Georgi Karadushev =

Bulgarian wrestler

Personal information
- Nationality: Bulgarian
- Born: 2 March 1958 (age 68) Varna, Bulgaria

Sport
- Sport: Wrestling

Georgi Karadushev (born 2 March 1958) is a Bulgarian wrestler. He competed in the men's freestyle 100 kg at the 1988 Summer Olympics.
