= Ilia Georgiev =

Bulgarian wrestler

Personal information
- Full name: Ilia Vasilev Georgiev
- Nationality: Bulgarian
- Born: 21 January 1963 (age 63) Balchik, Bulgaria

Sport
- Sport: Wrestling

Ilia Vasilev Georgiev (born 21 January 1963) is a Bulgarian wrestler. He competed in the men's Greco-Roman 100 kg at the 1988 Summer Olympics.
