= Jackson Bidei =

Nigerian wrestler

Personal information
- Nationality: Nigerian
- Born: 10 October 1957 (age 68)

Sport
- Sport: Wrestling

Jackson Bidei (born 10 October 1957) is a Nigerian former wrestler. He competed in the men's freestyle 100 kg at the 1988 Summer Olympics.
