= Hugo Allan García =

Guatemalan middle-distance runner

Personal information
- Born: 1 April 1963 (age 63) Puerto Barrios, Guatemala
- Height: 167 cm (5 ft 6 in)
- Weight: 52 kg (115 lb)

Sport
- Country: Guatemala
- Sport: Middle-distance running
Medal record
Representing Guatemala
Central American Games
Gold medal – first place	1986 Guatemala City	3000m steeplechase
Silver medal – second place	1986 Guatemala City	1500m
Silver medal – second place	1990 Tegucigalpa	3000m steeplechase
Silver medal – second place	1997 San Pedro Sula	3000m steeplechase
Bronze medal – third place	1990 Tegucigalpa	1500m
Bronze medal – third place	1990 Tegucigalpa	3000m

Hugo Allan García Molina is a Guatemalan Olympic middle-distance runner. He represented his country in the men's 1500 meters and the 3000 metres steeplechase at the 1984 Summer Olympics. His time was a 3:57.59 in the 1500, and a 9:02.41 in the 3000 steeplechase heats.

== International competitions ==
Year	Competition	Venue	Position	Event	Notes
Representing Guatemala
1980	Central American and Caribbean; Junior in Athletics (U17)	Nassau, Bahamas	3rd	1500 m	3:11.5
1980	Central American and Caribbean; Junior in Athletics (U17)	Nassau, Bahamas	3rd	5000 m	8:53.4
1983	Universiade	Edmonton, Canada	17th (h)	1500 m	4:01.03
1983	Universiade	Edmonton, Canada	14th (h)	3000 m s'chase	9:14.11
1983	Ibero-American Championships	Barcelona, Spain	5th	800 m	1:56.97
1983	Ibero-American Championships	Barcelona, Spain	3rd	1500 m	4:05.93
1984	Olympic Games	Los Angeles, United States	45th (h)	1500 m	3:57.59
1984	Olympic Games	Los Angeles, United States	31st (h)	3000 m s'chase	9:02.41
1984	Central American Championships	Guatemala City, Guatemala	2nd	1500 m	3:57.1
1984	Central American Championships	Guatemala City, Guatemala	5th	5000 m	15:42.5
1984	Central American Championships	Guatemala City, Guatemala	1st	3000 m s'chase	9:28.4
1985	Universiade	Kobe, Japan	24th	1500 m	3:53.50
1985	Universiade	Kobe, Japan	17th (h)	5000 m	14:15.70
1985	Universiade	Kobe, Japan	8th	3000 m s'chase	8:46.45
1986	Central American and Caribbean Games	Guatemala City, Guatemala	2nd	5000 m	
1986	Central American and Caribbean Games	Guatemala City, Guatemala	1st	3000 m s'chase	9:13.1
1986	Ibero-American Championships	Havana, Cuba	9th	5000 m	14:13.85
1986	Ibero-American Championships	Havana, Cuba	7th	10,000 m	31:09.63
1987	Universiade	Zagreb, Yugoslavia	13th	5000 m	14:39.20
1987	Universiade	Zagreb, Yugoslavia	9th	10,000 m	30:46.84
1987	Pan American Games	Indianapolis, United States	9th	5000 m	14:37.62
1987	Pan American Games	Indianapolis, United States	7th	10,000 m	29:36.43
1987	World Championships	Rome, Italy	29th (h)	5000 m	14:08.72
1990	Central American Games	Tegucigalpa, Honduras	3rd	5000 m	
1990	Central American Games	Tegucigalpa, Honduras	3rd	10,000 m	
1990	Central American Games	Tegucigalpa, Honduras	2nd	3000 m s'chase	
1997	Central American Games	San Pedro Sula, Honduras	2nd	3000 m s'chase	
