= Dennis Koslowski =

American wrestler

Personal information
- Full name: Dennis Marwin Koslowski
- Born: August 16, 1959 (age 67) Watertown, South Dakota, U.S.

Sport
- Country: United States
- Sport: Wrestling
- Weight class: 100 kg
- Events: Greco-Roman; Folkstyle
- College team: Minnesota-Morris
- Club: Minnesota Wrestling Club
- Team: USA
Medal record
Men's Greco-Roman wrestling
Representing the United States
Olympic Games
Silver medal – second place	1992 Barcelona	100 kg
Bronze medal – third place	1988 Seoul	100 kg
World Championships
Silver medal – second place	1987 Clermont-Ferrand	100 kg
Pan American Games
Silver medal – second place	1983 Caracas	100 kg
Silver medal – second place	1987 Indianapolis	100 kg
Collegiate Wrestling
Representing Minnesota-Morris
NCAA Division III Championships
Gold medal – first place	1980 New London	190 lb
Gold medal – first place	1982 Cortland	Heavyweight

Dennis Marwin Koslowski (born August 16, 1959) is an American amateur wrestler and professional wrestler. He was born in Watertown, South Dakota. He was Olympic bronze medalist in Greco-Roman wrestling in 1988, and won a silver medal in 1992. In 2009, he was inducted into the National Wrestling Hall of Fame as a Distinguished Member.

Koslowski is a graduate of the University of Minnesota Morris, where he was a stand-out wrestler along with twin brother Duane. He was a two time NCAA Division III national champion, two-time Northern Intercollegiate Conference champion and a three-time NCAA III All-American; he also played football as an offensive linesman. He is a member of the University of Minnesota Morris and Northern Sun Intercollegiate Conference Hall of Fame.

Koslowski briefly competed as a professional wrestler for Japanese shoot style promotion UWF International. On December 20, 1992, he fought UWFi's top star Nobuhiko Takada in a losing effort at Ryōgoku Kokugikan. He wrestled a further eight time, with his final match coming almost a year later on December 5, 1993, where he lost to Kiyoshi Tamura.

Since retiring from sports, Koslowski works as a chiropractor for his own practice.
