= Masahiko Fukube =

Japanese wrestler

Personal information
- Full name: 福辺雅彦 Fukube Masahiko
- Nationality: Japanese
- Born: 6 September 1961 (age 64)

Sport
- Sport: Wrestling

Masahiko Fukube (born 6 September 1961) is a Japanese wrestler. He competed in the men's Greco-Roman 100 kg at the 1988 Summer Olympics.
