= Athletics at the 1991 Pan American Games – Men's 3000 metres steeplechase =

Men's 3,000 metres steeplechase at the Pan American Games

The men's 3000 metres steeplechase event at the 1991 Pan American Games was held in Havana, Cuba on 5 August.

== Results ==
Rank	Name	Nationality	Time	Notes
1st place, gold medalist(s)	Adauto Domingues	Brazil	8:36.01	
2nd place, silver medalist(s)	Ricardo Vera	Uruguay	8:36.83	
3rd place, bronze medalist(s)	Juan Ramón Conde	Cuba	8:37.53	
4	Marcelo Cascabelo	Argentina	8:37.90	
5	Dan Reese	United States	8:39.58	
6	Germán Silva	Mexico	8:51.16	
7	Antonio Conde	Cuba	8:57.71	
8	Henry Klassen	Canada	9:09.31	
9	Jim Cooper	United States	9:15.31	
10	Roger Miranda	Nicaragua	9:33.90	
	Rubén García	Mexico	DNS	
