= Yoo Young-tae =

South Korean wrestler

Personal information
- Nationality: South Korean
- Born: 17 June 1961 (age 65)

Sport
- Sport: Wrestling

Yoo Young-tae (born 17 June 1961) is a South Korean wrestler. He competed in the men's Greco-Roman 100 kg at the 1988 Summer Olympics.
