= István Robotka =

Hungarian wrestler

Personal information
- Nationality: Hungarian
- Born: 5 January 1958 (age 68) Pásztó, Hungary

Sport
- Sport: Wrestling

István Robotka (born 5 January 1958) is a Hungarian wrestler. He competed in the men's freestyle 100 kg at the 1988 Summer Olympics.
