= Wojciech Wala =

Polish wrestler (1965–2024)

Personal information
- Nationality: Polish
- Born: 19 February 1965 Świeca, Poland
- Died: 18 September 2024 (aged 59)

Sport
- Sport: Wrestling

Wojciech Wala (19 February 1965 – 18 September 2024) was a Polish wrestler. He competed in the men's freestyle 100 kg at the 1988 Summer Olympics.

Wala died on 18 September 2024, at the age of 59.
