= Jo Byung-eun =

South Korean wrestler (born 1961)

Personal information
- Nationality: South Korean
- Born: 14 June 1961 (age 65)

Sport
- Sport: Wrestling

Jo Byung-eun (born 14 June 1961) is a South Korean wrestler. He competed in the men's freestyle 100 kg at the 1988 Summer Olympics.
