= Athletics at the 1987 Pan American Games – Men's 10,000 metres =

Men's 10,000 metres at the Pan American Games

The men's 10,000 metres event at the 1987 Pan American Games was held in Indianapolis, United States on 12 August.

== Results ==
Rank	Name	Nationality	Time	Notes
1st place, gold medalist(s)	Bruce Bickford	United States	28:20.37	GR
2nd place, silver medalist(s)	Rolando Vera	Ecuador	28:22.56	NR
3rd place, bronze medalist(s)	Paul McCloy	Canada	28:38.07	
4	Omar Aguilar	Chile	29:06.48	
5	Domingo Tibaduiza	Colombia	29:34.21	
6	José Luis Chuela	Mexico	29:36.14	
7	Hugo Allan García	Guatemala	29:36.43	
8	Roger Soler	Peru	29:50.21	
10	Néstor Jami	Ecuador	30:40.50	
	Jesús Herrera	Mexico	DNF	
	Pat Porter	United States	DNS	
	Antonio Silio	Argentina	DNS	
