= Wilfried Colling =

German wrestler

Personal information
- Nationality: German
- Born: 12 December 1959 (age 66) Aldenhoven, Germany

Sport
- Sport: Wrestling

Wilfried Colling (born 12 December 1959) is a German wrestler. He competed in the men's freestyle 100 kg at the 1988 Summer Olympics.
