= Spyros Andriopoulos =

Greek long-distance runner

Personal information
- Nationality: Greece
- Born: August 1, 1962 (age 64) Patras, Greece

Sport
- Sport: Athletics

Achievements and titles
- Personal bests: 10,000 m: 28:07.17; Half marathon: 1:03:04; Marathon: 2:12:04
Medal record
Mediterranean Games
Bronze medal – third place	1987 Latakia	10,000 m
Summer Universiade
Silver medal – second place	1987 Zagreb	10,000m

Spyros Andriopoulos (Greek: Σπύρος Ανδριόπουλος) (born 1 August 1962) is a retired Greek marathon and long-distance runner. He competed in the Marathon run at the 1996 Summer Olympics, where he placed 36th with a time of 2:19.41. He still holds the Greek national records in 10,000 metres, Half marathon and Marathon.

== International competitions ==
Year	Competition	Venue	Position	Event	Notes
1981	European Junior Championships	Utrecht, Netherlands	11th	5000 m	14:42.25
1984	European Indoor Championships	Gothenburg, Sweden	7th	3000 m	8:04.98
1987	Universiade	Zagreb, Yugoslavia	2nd	10,000 m	29:08.65
1987	World Championships	Rome, Italy	7th	10,000 m	28:07.17 NR
1987	Mediterranean Games	Latakia, Syria	3rd	10,000 m	28:40.38
1987	World Marathon Cup	Seoul, South Korea	12th	Marathon	2.14.19
1990	European Championships	Split, Yugoslavia	15th	10,000 m	28:28.95
1994	European Championships	Helsinki, Finland	37th	Marathon	2:19:01
1996	Olympic Games	Atlanta, United States	36th	Marathon	2:19:41
1997	World Championships	Athens, Greece	–	Marathon	DNF
1998	European Championships	Budapest, Hungary	–	Marathon	DNF
