= David Castro (swimmer) =

Brazilian swimmer OLY (born 1964)

Personal information
- Full name: David Ferreira Castro
- Born: 16 September 1964 (age 61) São Paulo, São Paulo, Brazil
- Height: 1.81 m (5 ft 11 in)
- Weight: 72 kg (159 lb)

Sport
- Sport: Swimming
- Strokes: Freestyle

David Ferreira Castro OLY (born 16 September 1964 in São Paulo) was a long-distance freestyle swimmer from Brazil. He represented his native country at the 1988 Summer Olympics in Seoul, South Korea in the 400-metre and 1500-metre freestyle events, see Brazil at the 1988 Summer Olympics.

David began his career in the pools of the Corinthians, where he remained for 10 years. Later, defending the club Paulistano, reached the Olympic passport.

At the 1988 Summer Olympics in Seoul, Castro finished 32nd in the 1500-metre freestyle, and 33rd in the 400-metre freestyle.

Castro participated at the 1991 Pan American Games in Havana, finishing 5th in the 1500-metre freestyle.

Castro also won four titles in Brazil Trophy (1500-metre freestyle), five titles in Jose Finkel (1500-metre freestyle and 800-metre freestyle) and one runner-up in the 1990 South American (1500-meters freestyle), among other achievements. Ended his career in 27 November 2000. He graduated in Computer and Physical Education and speaks three languages (English, Spanish and French).
