= Athletics at the 1987 Summer Universiade – Men's 5000 metres =

The men's 5000 metres event at the 1987 Summer Universiade was held at the Stadion Maksimir in Zagreb on 18 and 19 July 1987.

== Medalists ==
Gold	Silver	Bronze
Anacleto Jiménez; Spain	Michael Blackmore; United States	Dave Swain; Great Britain

== Results ==
=== Heats ===
Rank	Heat	Athlete	Nationality	Time	Notes
1	2	Jay Marden	United States	14:17.34	Q
2	2	Borislav Dević	Yugoslavia	14:17.66	Q
3	2	John Halvorsen	Norway	14:18.01	Q
4	2	Gerard Ryan	Australia	14:18.80	Q
5	2	Juan Linares	Cuba	14:21.16	Q
6	1	Michael Blackmore	United States	14:35.76	Q
7	2	Panagiotis Fotiou	Greece	14:36.22	q
8	1	James Harrison	Australia	14:36.30	Q
9	1	Hugo Allan García	Guatemala	14:36.55	Q
10	2	Anacleto Jiménez	Spain	14:37.17	q
11	1	Dave Swain	Great Britain	14:38.63	Q
12	1	Edward Rendall	Canada	14:39.78	Q
13	1	Noel Richardson	Ireland	14:41.34	q
14	1	Nicos Vassiliou	Cyprus	14:43.02	q
15	1	Faiz Didin	Jordan	14:46.94	q
16	2	Lansana Touré	Guinea	15:30.10	
17	2	Byron Vargas	Honduras	15:36.33	
18	1	Modupe Jonah	Sierra Leone	15:45.38	
19	1	Saidou Hangadoumbo	Niger	16:28.78	
20	2	Mahdi Al-Oun	Jordan	16:39.73	

=== Final ===
Rank	Athlete	Nationality	Time	Notes
1st place, gold medalist(s)	Anacleto Jiménez	Spain	14:08.15	
2nd place, silver medalist(s)	Michael Blackmore	United States	14:08.30	
3rd place, bronze medalist(s)	Dave Swain	Great Britain	14:09.21	
4	John Halvorsen	Norway	14:12.11	
5	Jay Marden	United States	14:13.60	
6	Juan Linares	Cuba	14:15.09	
7	Gerard Ryan	Australia	14:16.05	
8	James Harrison	Australia	14:23.12	
9	Panagiotis Fotiou	Greece	14:26.21	
10	Noel Richardson	Ireland	14:27.10	
11	Borislav Dević	Yugoslavia	14:34.03	
12	Edward Rendall	Canada	14:38.49	
13	Hugo Allan García	Guatemala	14:39.20	
14	Faiz Didin	Jordan	15:37.00	
	Nicos Vassiliou	Cyprus	DNS	
