= Athletics at the 1987 Summer Universiade – Men's 3000 metres steeplechase =

The men's 3000 metres steeplechase event at the 1987 Summer Universiade was held at the Stadion Maksimir in Zagreb on 16 July 1987.

== Results ==
Rank	Athlete	Nationality	Time	Notes
1st place, gold medalist(s)	Valeriy Vandyak	Soviet Union	8:33.23	
2nd place, silver medalist(s)	Juan Ramón Conde	Cuba	8:33.86	
3rd place, bronze medalist(s)	Shigeyuki Aikyo	Japan	8:34.23	
4	Juan Linares	Cuba	8:34.60	
5	Engelbrecht Franz	West Germany	8:35.67	
6	Daniel Bell	United States	8:39.26	
7	Svetlin Strashilov	Bulgaria	8:41.57	
8	Slobodan Cmorzak	Yugoslavia	8:45.50	
9	Juan Bautista Gramaje	Spain	8:48.48	
10	Dariusz Kaczmarski	Poland	8:53.69	
11	Ersin Ata	Turkey	9:07.87	
12	Ilkka Väänänen	Finland	9:24.37	
13	Omar Ammouri	Jordan	9:26.56	
14	Jorge Ponce	Honduras	9:35.21	
	José César Sánchez	Spain	DNF	
