= Adauto Domingues =

Brazilian steeplechase runner

Personal information
- Born: 20 May 1961 (age 65) São Caetano do Sul, Brazil

Sport
- Sport: Track and field
Medal record
Representing Brazil
Pan American Games
Gold medal – first place	1987 Indianapolis	3000m steeplechase
Gold medal – first place	1991 Havana	3000m steeplechase
Silver medal – second place	1987 Indianapolis	5000m

Adauto Donizete Domingues (born 20 May 1961) is a retired middle-distance runner from Brazil, who twice won the gold medal in the men's 3000 metres steeplechase at the Pan American Games: in 1987 and 1991. He represented his native country at the 1988 Summer Olympics.

== International competitions ==
Year	Competition	Venue	Position	Event	Notes
Representing Brazil
1983	Ibero-American Championships	Barcelona, Spain	3rd	3,000 m steeple	8:40.17
1983	South American Championships	Santa Fe, Argentina	3rd	1500 m	3:50.8
1983	South American Championships	Santa Fe, Argentina	3rd	3,000 m steeple	8:50.8
1985	Universiade	Kobe, Japan	7th	5,000 m	14:06.46
1985	Universiade	Kobe, Japan	4th	3,000 m steeple	8:32.97
1985	South American Championships	Santiago, Chile	1st	1500 m	3:42.16
1985	South American Championships	Santiago, Chile	1st	3,000 m steeple	8:44.38
1986	Ibero-American Championships	Havana, Cuba	2nd	5,000 m	13:50.36
1986	Ibero-American Championships	Havana, Cuba	1st	3,000 m steeple	8:31.91
1987	Pan American Games	Indianapolis, United States	2nd	5,000 m	13:46.41
1987	Pan American Games	Indianapolis, United States	1st	3,000 m steeple	8:23.26
1989	South American Championships	Medellín, Colombia	1st	3,000 m steeple	8:49.2 A
1989	Universiade	Duisburg, West Germany	11th	3,000 m steeple	8:46.58
1991	South American Championships	Manaus, Brazil	1st	3,000 m steeple	8:36.21
1991	Pan American Games	Havana, Cuba	1st	3,000 m steeple	8:36.01
1993	South American Championships	Lima, Peru	1st	1500 m	3:46.4
1993	South American Championships	Lima, Peru	1st	3,000 m steeple	8:36.9
