= Régis Avila =

Brazilian fencer

Personal information
- Born: 17 October 1962 (age 63)

Sport
- Sport: Fencing

Régis Avila (born 17 October 1962) is a Brazilian fencer. He competed in the sabre and épée events at the 1988 Summer Olympics.
