= Fritz Gerdsmeier =

German wrestler

Personal information
- Nationality: German
- Born: 28 April 1962 (age 62); Aschaffenburg, Germany

Sport
- Sport: Wrestling

Fritz Gerdsmeier (born 28 April 1962) is a German former wrestler. He competed at the 1984 Summer Olympics and the 1988 Summer Olympics.
