= Tsukasa Endo =

Japanese long-distance runner

Personal information
- Nationality: Japanese
- Born: 9 November 1961 (age 64) Tokyo, Japan

Sport
- Sport: Long-distance running
- Event: 10,000 metres

Tsukasa Endo (遠藤 司, Endō Tsukasa; born 9 November 1961) is a Japanese long-distance runner. He competed in the men's 10,000 metres at the 1988 Summer Olympics.
