= Isabelle Vieira =

Brazilian swimmer

Personal information
- Full name: Isabelle Marques Vieira
- Born: November 13, 1971 (age 54) Brazil
- Height: 1.71 m (5 ft 7 in)
- Weight: 64 kg (141 lb)

Sport
- Sport: Swimming
- Strokes: Freestyle
Medal record
Women's swimming
Representing Brazil
Pan American Games
| Bronze medal – third place | 1991 Havana | 4 × 100m freestyle |

Isabelle Marques Vieira (born November 13, 1971) is a former Olympic freestyle swimmer from Brazil, who participated in a Summer Olympics for her native country.

At the 1988 Summer Olympics in Seoul, she finished 11th in the 4×100-metre freestyle, and 37th in the 100-metre freestyle.

She was at the 1991 Pan American Games in Havana, where she earned a bronze medal in the 4×100-metre freestyle.
