= José Moreira (swimmer) =

Brazilian swimmer

Personal information
- Full name: José Geraldo da Costa Moreira Filho
- Nationality: Brazilian
- Born: 21 November 1961 (age 64)
- Height: 1.78 m (5 ft 10 in)
- Weight: 72 kg (159 lb)

Sport
- Sport: Swimming
- Strokes: Freestyle

José Geraldo da Costa Moreira Filho (born 21 November 1961) is a former international freestyle swimmer from Brazil, who participated for his native country at the 1988 Summer Olympics in Seoul, South Korea. There, he ended up in 33rd place in the men's 50-metre freestyle event.
