= George Rebello =

Brazilian windsurfer

Personal information
- Full name: George Mulim Rebello
- Born: 18 August 1966 (age 60) Macaé, Rio de Janeiro, Brazil

Sport
- Sport: Windsurfing

George Mulim Rebello (born 18 August 1966) is a Brazilian windsurfer. He competed at the 1988 Summer Olympics and the 1992 Summer Olympics.
