= Clóvis Anderson =

Brazilian cyclist

Personal information
- Born: 6 September 1963 (age 63) São Paulo, Brazil

Cycling career
- Sport: Cycling

Clóvis Anderson (born 6 September 1963) is a Brazilian former cyclist. He competed in two events at the 1988 Summer Olympics.
