= Jožef Tertei =

Yugoslav wrestler (born 1960)

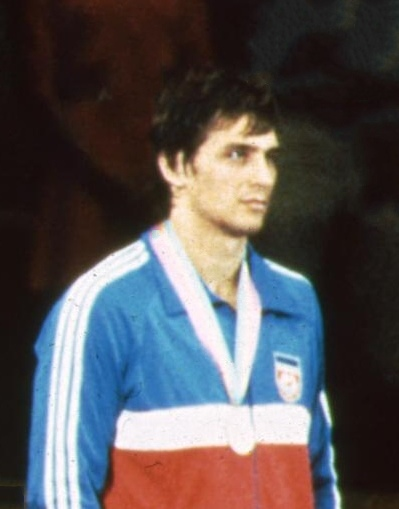
- Jožef Tertei in 1984

Personal information
- Born: 4 May 1960 (age 66) Senta, PR Serbia, FPR Yugoslavia
- Height: 1.89 m (6 ft 2 in)
- Weight: 100 kg (220 lb)

Sport
- Sport: Greco-Roman wrestling
- Club: RK Senta
Medal record
Representing Yugoslavia
Olympic Games
Bronze medal – third place	1984 Los Angeles	-100 kg
World Championships
Silver medal – second place	1983 Kiev	-100 kg
European Championships
Gold medal – first place	1986 Piraeus	-100kg
Silver medal – second place	1988 Kolbotn	-100kg
Bronze medal – third place	1982 Varna	-100kg

Jožef Tertei (born 5 May 1960) is a retired wrestler who competed for Yugoslavia. He won a bronze medal at the 1984 Summer Olympics and finished fifth place in the 1988 Summer Olympics in the heavyweight class (under 100 kg).

He won a silver medal at the 1983 World Wrestling Championships and three medals at European championships in 1982, 1986 and 1988, including a gold medal in 1986.
