= Leri Khabelov =

Georgian politician and wrestler

Medal record

Men's freestyle wrestling

Olympic Games

Representing Unified Team
Gold medal – first place	1992 Barcelona	100 kg

Representing Soviet Union
Silver medal – second place	1988 Seoul	100 kg

World Championships

Representing Soviet Union
Gold medal – first place	1985 Budapest	100 kg
Gold medal – first place	1987 Clermont-Ferrand	100 kg
Gold medal – first place	1990 Tokyo	100 kg
Gold medal – first place	1991 Varna	100 kg

World Championships

Representing Russia
Gold medal – first place	1993 Toronto	100 kg
Bronze medal – third place	1995 Atlanta	130 kg

Leri Khabelov (Georgian: ლერი ხაბელოვი, Russian: Лери Габрелович Хабелов) (born 5 July 1964) is a Georgian politician and a retired wrestler, formerly a Soviet Olympic champion in Freestyle wrestling. In 2012, he was elected to the Parliament of Georgia on a ticket of the Georgian Dream party.

== Sport career ==
An ethnic Ossetian, Leri Khabelov was born in Tbilisi, then-Soviet Georgia in 1964. His achievements included being the Champion of the XXV Olympic Games (1992 Barcelona), second-prize winner of the XXIV Olympic Games (1988 Seoul), five-fold World Champion (1985, 1987, 1990, 1991, 1993) and third-prize winner (1995), four-fold European Champion (1985, 1987, 1988, 1992), winner of the World Cup (1991), World Champion among boys (1982)and youths (1983), three-fold Champion of the USSR (1985, 1987, 1988), Champion of the IX USSR Peoples Spartaciads (1986). From 1993 to 1996, he contested for the Russian Federation. For his contribution to the sports, he has been granted the title of Honored Master of Sports by the Soviet Union and the Vakhtang Gorgasali Order, 2nd Class, and the Order of Honor by Georgia. He has been a vice-president of the Georgian National Olympic Committee from 2000 to 2007 and deputy chairman of the Sports Department of Georgia from 1998 to 2004. Khabelov is the President of the Georgian National Olympic Association and National Olympians Association.

== Political career ==
Leri Khabelov became involved in the Georgian politics in 2008, when he ran, unsuccessfully, in the parliamentary election on a ticket of the opposition Republican Party of Georgia . In 2012, he joined the new opposition party Georgian Dream spearheaded by the tycoon Bidzina Ivanishvili. He was elected to the Parliament in the October 1, 2012 election and became a chairman of the parliamentary Committee for Sport and Youth Affairs on October 21, 2012.
