= Wayne Brightwell =

Canadian wrestler (born 1957)

Wayne Brightwell (born 2 December 1957) is a Canadian former wrestler who competed in the 1984 Summer Olympics. He was born in Sudbury, Ontario.
