= Juan Ramón Conde =

Cuban long-distance runner

Personal information
- Full name: Juan Ramón Conde Guerra
- Born: 30 April 1965 Santa Clara, Cuba
- Died: 7 May 2022 (aged 57)
- Height: 1.75 m (5 ft 9 in)
- Weight: 65 kg (143 lb)

Sport
- Sport: Athletics
- Event: 3000 metres steeplechase
Medal record
Representing Cuba
Summer Universiade
Silver medal – second place	1987 Zagreb	3000m steeplechase
Pan American Games
Bronze medal – third place	1991 Havana	3000m steeplechase
Central American and Caribbean Games
Gold medal – first place	1986 Santiago	3000m steeplechase
Bronze medal – third place	1993 Ponce	3000m steeplechase

Juan Ramón Conde Guerra (30 April 1965 – 7 May 2022) was a Cuban long-distance runner who specialised in the 3000 metres steeplechase. He won multiple medals at regional level in addition to a silver medal won at the 1987 Summer Universiade.

His twin brother Juan Antonio Conde was also a runner.

== International competitions ==
Year	Competition	Venue	Position	Event	Notes
Representing Cuba
1985	Central American and Caribbean Championships	Nassau, Bahamas	1st	3000 m s'chase	8:36.80
1986	Central American and Caribbean Games	Santiago, Dominican Republic	1st	3000 m s'chase	8:42.38
1986	Ibero-American Championships	Havana, Cuba	2nd	3000 m s'chase	8:34.08
1987	Universiade	Zagreb, Yugoslavia	25th (h)	1500 m	3:52.16
1987	Universiade	Zagreb, Yugoslavia	2nd	3000 m s'chase	8:33.86
1987	Central American and Caribbean Championships	Caracas, Venezuela	1st	3000 m s'chase	8:42.38
1987	Pan American Games	Indianapolis, United States	7th	3000 m s'chase	8:43.78
1989	Central American and Caribbean Championships	San Juan, Puerto Rico	1st	3000 m s'chase	8:48.13
1991	Pan American Games	Havana, Cuba	8th	5000 m	14:27.90
1991	Pan American Games	Havana, Cuba	3rd	3000 m s'chase	8:37.53
1993	Central American and Caribbean Championships	Cali, Colombia	2nd	3000 m s'chase	8:53.98
1993	Central American and Caribbean Games	Ponce, Puerto Rico	3rd	3000 m s'chase	8:45.62
1994	Ibero-American Championships	Mar del Plata, Argentina	7th	3000 m s'chase	9:00.79

== Personal bests ==
Outdoor

- 5000 metres – 14:17.8 (Sancti Spiritus 1997)
- 10,000 metres – 30:19.08 (Havana 1997)
- 3000 metres steeplechase – 8:27.55 (Havana 1991)
