= Boldyn Javkhlantögs =

Mongolian wrestler (born 1964)

Personal information
- Nationality: Mongolian
- Born: 14 April 1964 (age 62)

Sport
- Sport: Wrestling
Medal record
Men's freestyle wrestling
Representing Mongolia
World Cup
Bronze medal – third place	1987 Ulaanbaatar	100 kg
Asian Games
Bronze medal – third place	1990 Beijing	130 kg

Boldyn Javkhlantögs (born 14 April 1964) is a Mongolian wrestler. He competed at the 1988 Summer Olympics and the 1992 Summer Olympics.
