= Fred Solovi =

Samoan wrestler

Personal information
- Nationality: Samoan
- Born: 9 March 1966 (age 60)

Sport
- Sport: Wrestling

Fred Solovi (born 9 March 1966) is a Samoan wrestler. He competed in the men's freestyle 100 kg at the 1988 Summer Olympics.
