= Eduardo de Poli =

Brazilian swimmer

Personal information
- Full name: Eduardo Alexandre de Poli
- Born: 19 February 1969 (age 57) Guarulhos, São Paulo, Brazil
- Height: 1.87 m (6 ft 2 in)
- Weight: 85 kg (187 lb)

Sport
- Sport: Swimming
- Strokes: Butterfly, Freestyle

Eduardo Alexandre de Poli (born 19 February 1969 in Guarulhos) is a former butterfly and freestyle swimmer from Brazil.

At the age of four, Eduardo de Poli moved with his family to Curitiba and, the following year, he started taking swimming lessons with his older brother and a neighbor.

In 1977, he joined the Clube do Golfinho team and participated in its first municipal competition.

In 1978, he participated for the first time in the Brazilian championship and won the bronze medal in the relay event. In the 1984 Brazilian Championship, he won the first gold medal in the 100 meters freestyle, beating the Brazilian record in the category. In 1985, he participated in the South American event in Argentina, and became champion of the 400 metre freestyle and 1500 metre freestyle.

Participated at the 1986 World Aquatics Championships in Madrid, where he finished 24th in the 1500-metre freestyle, 27th in the 400-metre freestyle, and 30th in the 200-metre butterfly.

At the 1988 Summer Olympics, in Seoul, he finished 18th in the 4×100-metre medley, 26th in the 100-metre butterfly, and 34th in the 200-metre butterfly.
