= Vasile Andrei =

Romanian Greco-Roman wrestler

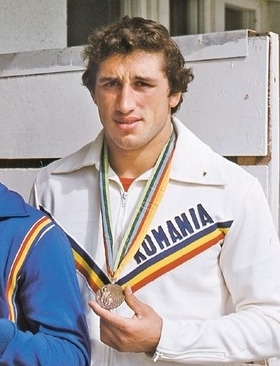
- Andrei at the 1980 Olympics

Personal information
- Born: 28 July 1955 (age 70) Albeşti, Romania
- Height: 1.90 m (6 ft 3 in)
- Weight: 100 kg (220 lb)

Sport
- Sport: Greco-Roman wrestling
- Club: Progresul Bucuresti; Steaua București
- Coached by: Dumitru Pârvulescu; Gheorghe Suteu
Medal record
Men's Greco-Roman wrestling
Representing Romania
Olympic Games
Gold medal – first place	1984 Los Angeles	100 kg
Bronze medal – third place	1980 Moscow	100 kg
World Championships
Silver medal – second place	1982 Katowice	100 kg
Silver medal – second place	1986 Budapest	100 kg
Bronze medal – third place	1987 Clermont-Ferrand	100 kg
European Championships
Silver medal – second place	1980 Prievidza	100 kg
Silver medal – second place	1987 Tampere	100 kg
Bronze medal – third place	1979 Bucharest	100 kg
Summer Universiade
Silver medal – second place	1981 Bucharest	100 kg

Vasile Andrei (born 28 July 1955) is a retired heavyweight wrestler from Romania. He competed in Greco-Roman wrestling at the 1980, 1984 and 1988 Olympics and won a bronze medal in 1980 and a gold medal in 1984. At the 1984 Olympics he also placed sixth in freestyle wrestling, and in 1980 and 1988 served as flag bearer for Romania at the opening ceremony. At the world and European championships he won six medals in Greco-Roman wrestling between 1979 and 1987.

Andrei took up wrestling at Progresul Bucuresti coached by Dumitru Pârvulescu and later moved to Steaua București. After retiring from competitions he worked as a wrestling coach, and in 2000 trained the Tunisian national team.
