= Mônica Rezende =

Brazilian swimmer

Personal information
- Full name: Mônica Rezende
- Born: June 13, 1969 (age 57) Pará, Brazil
- Height: 1.65 m (5 ft 5 in)
- Weight: 54 kg (119 lb)

Sport
- Sport: Swimming
- Strokes: Freestyle, Backstroke

Mônica Rezende (born June 13, 1969 in Pará) is a former international freestyle swimmer from Brazil.

Swam 14 years by the Clube do Remo.

When she turned 18, Monica received invitation of the Minas Tênis Clube and went on to defend the club. Made the University of Architecture and Physical Education, and later a master's degree in a Portuguese university.

At the 1986 World Aquatics Championships in Madrid, Rezende finished 27th in the 200-metre backstroke, and 29th in the 100-metre backstroke.

At the 1988 Summer Olympics, in Seoul, she swam the first olympic event of history in the 50-metre freestyle, breaking the Olympic Record for some minutes, with a time of 27.44 seconds. She won the third series, breaking the Olympic record set in the previous series by the Costa Rica's swimmer Carolina Mauri (27.96 seconds). Monica's record lasted only one series. In the next series, Diane Van Der Plats from the Netherlands won with 26.49 seconds. She finished 31st in the 50-metre freestyle, and 11th in the 4×100-metre freestyle.

Mônica was the coach of Clube do Remo between 1995 and 2007, and today works in swimming gyms.
