= Tamás Gáspár =

Hungarian Greco-Roman wrestler

Medal record

Representing Hungary

Men's Greco-Roman wrestling

World Championships
Gold medal – first place	1986 Budapest	100 kg
Silver medal – second place	1981 Oslo	100 kg
Silver medal – second place	1985 Kolbotn	100 kg

European Championships
Gold medal – first place	1984 Jönköping	100 kg
Silver medal – second place	1983 Budapest	100 kg

Tamás Gáspár (born 19 July 1960) is a Hungarian wrestler and world champion in Greco-Roman wrestling.

== World championships ==
Gáspár received a silver medal at the 1981 FILA Wrestling World Championships in Oslo, and at the 1985 FILA Wrestling World Championships in Kolbotn. He won a gold medal at the 1986 FILA Wrestling World Championships in Budapest.

== Olympics ==
Gáspár competed at the 1980 Summer Olympics in Moscow where he finished 9th in Greco-Roman wrestling, the heavyweight class. At the 1988 Summer Olympics in Seoul he finished 8th in the heavyweight class.

== Awards ==
Gáspár was elected Hungarian Sportsman of the Year 1984 for winning a gold medal at that year's European Championships.

Awards
Preceded by György Guczoghy	Hungarian Sportsman of The Year; 1984	Succeeded by Attila Mizsér
