= Paulo Roese =

Brazilian volleyball player (born 1963)

Personal information
- Born: 14 February 1963 (age 62); Novo Hamburgo, Brazil

Sport
- Sport: Volleyball

Paulo Roese (born 14 February 1963) is a Brazilian volleyball player. He competed in the men's tournament at the 1988 Summer Olympics.
