= Karl-Johan Gustavsson =

Swedish wrestler

Personal information
- Nationality: Swedish
- Born: 21 July 1958 (age 66); Lidköping, Sweden

Sport
- Sport: Wrestling

Karl-Johan Gustavsson (born 21 July 1958) is a Swedish wrestler. He competed in two events at the 1984 Summer Olympics.
