= Hayri Sezgin =

Turkish wrestler

Hayri Sezgin (19 January 1961 – 5 May 2013) was a Turkish wrestler who competed in the 1984 Summer Olympics and in the 1988 Summer Olympics.
