= Georgios Poikilidis =

Greek wrestler

Personal information
- Nationality: Greek
- Born: 31 October 1961 (age 63)

Sport
- Sport: Wrestling

Georgios Poikilidis (born 31 October 1961) is a Greek wrestler. He competed at the 1980 Summer Olympics, the 1984 Summer Olympics and the 1988 Summer Olympics. His brother was Panagiotis.
