= Maisiba Obwoge =

Kenyan wrestler

Personal information
- Nationality: Kenyan
- Born: 6 September 1961 (age 63)

Sport
- Sport: Wrestling

Maisiba Obwoge (born 6 September 1961) is a Kenyan wrestler. He competed in two events at the 1988 Summer Olympics.
