= Yoshihiro Fujita (wrestler) =

Japanese Greco-Roman wrestler

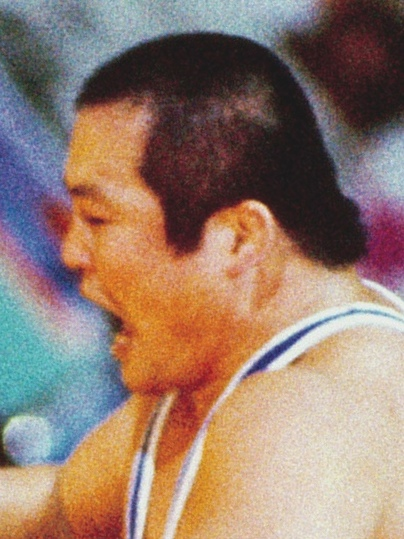
- Fujita at the 1984 Olympics

Personal information
- Born: April 12, 1952 (age 74)
- Height: 1.76 m (5 ft 9 in)
- Weight: 100 kg (220 lb)

Sport
- Sport: Greco-Roman wrestling
Medal record
Representing Japan
Asian Games
Silver medal – second place	1974 Tehran	Greco-Roman, −90 kg

Yoshihiro Fujita (藤田 芳弘, Fujita Yoshihiro; born April 12, 1952) is a retired Japanese Greco-Roman wrestler. He won a silver medal at the 1974 Asian Games and finished in seventh place at the 1984 Summer Olympics.
