= Floriano Spiess =

Brazilian wrestler

Personal information
- Born: 26 August 1967 (age 57); Canoas, Brazil

Sport
- Sport: Wrestling

Floriano Spiess (born 26 August 1967) is a Brazilian wrestler. He competed in two events at the 1988 Summer Olympics.
