= Ivan Yarygin =

Soviet wrestler (1948–1997)

- Ivan Yarygin in 1976

Personal information
- Native name: Иван Сергеевич Ярыгин
- Full name: Ivan Sergeyevich Yarygin
- Born: 7 November 1948 Ust-Kamzas, Kemerovo Oblast, Russian SFSR, Soviet Union
- Died: 11 October 1997 (aged 48) Neftekumsk, Stavropol Krai, Russia
- Height: 188 cm (6 ft 2 in)
- Weight: 100 kg (220 lb)

Sport
- Sport: Freestyle wrestling
- Club: Mindiashvili wrestling academy Trud Krasnoyarsk
- Coached by: Dmitry Mindiashvili
Medal record
Representing Soviet Union
Event	1st	2nd	3rd
Olympic Games	2	0	0
World Championship	1	0	0
World Cup	5	0	0
Universiade	1	0	0
European Championship	3	2	0
Total	12	2	0
Olympic Games
Gold medal – first place	1972 Munich	100 kg
Gold medal – first place	1976 Montreal	100 kg
World Championships
Gold medal – first place	1973 Tehran	100 kg
World Cup
Gold medal – first place	1973 Toledo	100 kg
Gold medal – first place	1976 Toledo	100 kg
Gold medal – first place	1977 Toledo	100 kg
Gold medal – first place	1979 Toledo	100 kg
Gold medal – first place	1980 Toledo	100 kg
European Championships
Gold medal – first place	1972 Katowice	100 kg
Gold medal – first place	1975 Ludwigshafen	100 kg
Gold medal – first place	1976 Leningrad	100 kg
Silver medal – second place	1970 Berlin	100 kg
Silver medal – second place	1974 Madrid	100 kg
Universiades
Gold medal – first place	1973 Moscow	100 kg
USSR Championships
Gold medal – first place	1973 Krasnoyarsk	100 kg
Gold medal – first place	1970 Makhachkala	100 kg

Ivan Sergeyevich Yarygin (Russian: Иван Сергеевич Ярыгин, IPA: [ɪˈvan sʲɪrˈɡʲe(j)ɪvʲɪtɕ jɪˈrɨɡʲɪn]; 7 November 1948 – 11 October 1997) was a Soviet and Russian heavyweight freestyle wrestler. Between 1970 and 1980 he won all his major international competitions, except for the 1970 and 1974 European championships where he placed second. Yarygin was an Olympic champion in 1972 and 1976, being the first wrestler to go through an Olympic competition with straight pin victories and no foul points, a world champion in 1973, a World Cup winner five times, has never lost a single match in World Cup competition, and a European champion in 1972 and 1975–76, and won a world cup in 1973, 1976–77 and 1979–80. He also set a record for the fastest pin victory in the World Cup history at 27 seconds. After retiring in 1980, he headed the Soviet freestyle wrestling team from 1982 to 1992 and the Russian Wrestling Federation from 1993 until his untimely death in a car crash in 1997. An exceptional upper-body wrestler, Yarygin was widely regarded for his tremendous physique and high-strength aggressive style, always aiming to pin down his opponents, with most of his stoppage wins came by way of fall achieved through rapid fireman's lift and slamming the opponent to the mat. One of the most prestigious tournaments in the World was put together in his honor - The Golden Grand Prix Ivan Yarygin Tournament is held annually in Krasnoyarsk, Russia, and has the reputation of being one of the hardest tournaments in the World. The Yarygin Memorial annually sees the world's best wrestlers come to Siberia, with the added element that Russia's autonomous oblasts and republics such as Dagestan and Chechnya field independent teams alongside an All-Russia selection.

== Biography ==
=== Childhood and early career ===
Yarygin was born as the sixth child in a family of ten siblings. Most members of his family were heavily built and physically active people. Since early age Yarygin helped his father at his blacksmith workshop. As a teenager he wanted to become a football goalkeeper, and took up wrestling only in 1966, aged 18. He then was drafted and went on to win the Soviet Armed Forces heavyweight championships in sambo wrestling, gaining the Master of Sports degree in sambo. He then switched to freestyle wrestling, and won 1968 Russian SFSR national youth championships and 1969 Soviet youth championships.

=== Prime years ===
In 1970, he won the Soviet title competing in senior division, beating his main rival Vladimir Gulyutkin; he lost to Gulyutkin in 1971, but beat him again at the 1972 Olympic Trials and was selected for the Munich Olympics. At the Olympics he won all five bouts by fall, spending on the mat a little more than 7 minutes instead of 45. Three months prior to the Olympics, he won the 1972 European Championships, winning all bouts by fall. When first appeared in the United States for the 1973 World Cup and the subsequent wrestling tour, the U.S.—Soviet Olympic freestyle wrestling exhibition, where he and the USSR National Wrestling Team met the United States National Team (composed of both National AAU, Athletes in Action and NCAA Wrestling Team Championship winners,) the American press described him as "a blue-eyed, red-haired, 24-year-old wrestler from the Soviet Union who spreads 220 pounds over an awesome, statuesque frame that might have been hammered and chiseled out of a granite block cornerstone from the Tomb of Lenin." He was a flagbearer for the Soviet wrestling team while on the U.S. tour. When Yarygin wrestled Russell Hellickson (whom he had his shoulder dislocated at their previous match-up at the Olympics) at Hellickson's hometown of Madison, Wisconsin, Yarygin let him up to prevent further injury, and wrestled just hard enough to protect himself until Hellickson finally fainted to pain.

After the Olympics, he won the 1973 World Championships, again all bouts by fall. Thus Yarygin became the only wrestler to win three consecutive major competitions, scoring only fall victories. He then lost several minor contests, and decided to retire from competition, settled in his native village of Sizaya, where he worked as a lumberjack in Taiga forest. Outdoor activity helped him to regain his strength and confidence, and he came back in 1974 to continue his victorious streak. His next Olympic victory in 1976 was less spectacular because he wrestled the whole tournament with two broken ribs. After that Yarygin was selected as the Soviet Olympic flag bearer at the closing ceremony.

Coming to Wilkes-Barre, Pennsylvania for the match-up versus the American National Wrestling Team, Soviet wrestlers were welcomed officially by Mayor Walter Lisman, and were given a key to Wilkes-Barre by the mayor.

=== Retirement ===
While preparing for the Moscow Olympics Yarygin realized that the young Soviet wrestler Ilya Mate has a better chance for the gold medal (which he indeed won). Yarygin retired from competition permanently in 1980 and became a wrestling coach. In 1982–92, he trained the Soviet freestyle wrestling team, and in 1993–1997 headed the Russian Wrestling Federation. He was a key organizer of the 1997 World Wrestling Championships in Krasnoyarsk.

== International competition record ==
International competition record (incomplete)
Res.	Opponent	Method	Time/ Score	Date	Event	Location	Venue
1980 World Cup Winner at 100kg
Win	(United States) Larry Bielenberg	Fall	1:14	1980-03-30	1980 World Cup	(United States) Toledo, Ohio	Centennial Hall
Win	(Canada) Wyatt Wishart	—N/a	—N/a	1980-03-28	1980 World Cup	(United States) Toledo, Ohio	Centennial Hall
Win	(Japan) Hiroaki Obayashi	—N/a	—N/a	1980-03-28	1980 World Cup	(United States) Toledo, Ohio	Centennial Hall
Win	(Cuba) Bárbaro Morgan	—N/a	—N/a	1980-03-28	1980 World Cup	(United States) Toledo, Ohio	Centennial Hall
Win	(Senegal) Ibrahima Sarr	—N/a	—N/a	1980-03-28	1980 World Cup	(United States) Toledo, Ohio	Centennial Hall
Loss	(United States) Howard Harris	Decision	7–8	1980-03-26	U.S.—Soviet all-star dual meet	(United States) Glens Falls, New York	Glens Falls Civic Center
Win	(United States) Fred Bohna	Fall	1:07	1979-04-07	Athletes in Action challenge	(United States) Anaheim, California	Anaheim Convention Center
Win	(United States)			1979-04	U.S.—Soviet all-star series Olympic freestyle wrestling four-city tour	(United States) Phoenix, Arizona	
—N/a	(United States) Larry Bielenberg	Decision	3–10	1979-04-02	U.S.—Soviet all-star series Olympic freestyle wrestling four-city tour	(United States) Rapid City, South Dakota	Rushmore Plaza Civic Center
1979 World Cup Winner at 100kg
Win	(United States) Fred Bohna	Inactivity		1979-04-01	1979 World Cup	(United States) Toledo, Ohio	Centennial Hall
Win	(Cuba) Bárbaro Morgan		—N/a	1979-03-31	1979 World Cup	(United States) Toledo, Ohio	Centennial Hall
Win	(History of Libya under Muammar Gaddafi) Ahmed Hamida	Fall	—N/a	1979-03-31	1979 World Cup	(United States) Toledo, Ohio	Centennial Hall
Win	(Japan) Hiroaki Yamamoto	Fall	—N/a	1979-03-31	1979 World Cup	(United States) Toledo, Ohio	Centennial Hall
Win	(United States) Larry Bielenberg		—N/a	1979-03-31	1979 World Cup	(United States) Toledo, Ohio	Centennial Hall
Win	(United States) John Setter	Fall	8:07	1979-03-28	U.S.—Soviet all-star series Olympic freestyle wrestling four-city tour	(United States) Wilkes-Barre, Pennsylvania	King's College Gym
Win	(United States)			1979-03-26	U.S.—Soviet all-star series Olympic freestyle wrestling four-city tour	(United States) New York City	Felt Forum
1977 World Cup Winner at 100kg
Win	(United States) Harold Smith	Fall	0:27	1977-03-27	1977 World Cup	(United States) Toledo, Ohio	Centennial Hall
Win	(Canada) Steve Daniar	Fall		1977-03-26	1977 World Cup	(United States) Toledo, Ohio	Centennial Hall
Win	(Japan) Yoshiaki Yatsu	Fall		1977-03-26	1977 World Cup	(United States) Toledo, Ohio	Centennial Hall
1976 Olympic Gold Medalist at 100kg
Win	(United States) Russell Hellickson	Decision	19–13	1976-07-27	1976 Summer Olympics	(Canada) Montreal	Maurice Richard Arena
Win	(Czechoslovakia) Petr Drozda	Tech Fall	5:30	1976-07-27	1976 Summer Olympics	(Canada) Montreal	Maurice Richard Arena
Win	(People's Republic of Bulgaria) Dimo Kostov	Decision	16–5	1976-07-27	1976 Summer Olympics	(Canada) Montreal	Maurice Richard Arena
Win	(Argentina) Daniel Verník	Tech Fall	1:26	1976-07-27	1976 Summer Olympics	(Canada) Montreal	Maurice Richard Arena
Win	(East Germany) Harald Büttner	Decision	13–5	1976-07-27	1976 Summer Olympics	(Canada) Montreal	Maurice Richard Arena
1976 European Champion at 100kg
Win	(People's Republic of Bulgaria) Dimo Kostov	—N/a	—N/a	1976-04-18	1976 European Championship	(Soviet Union) Leningrad	Yubileyny Sports Palace
Win	(Turkey) Mehmet Güçlü	—N/a	—N/a	1976-04-18	1976 European Championship	(Soviet Union) Leningrad	Yubileyny Sports Palace
Win	(Czechoslovakia) Petr Drozda	—N/a	—N/a	1976-04-18	1976 European Championship	(Soviet Union) Leningrad	Yubileyny Sports Palace
Win	(United States)			1976-03-	U.S.—Soviet all-star series Olympic freestyle wrestling tour	(United States) Miami, Florida	
Win	(United States) Jeff Smith	Fall	0:23	1976-03-04	U.S.—Soviet all-star series Olympic freestyle wrestling tour	(United States) East Lansing, Michigan	Jenison Fieldhouse
1976 World Cup Winner at 100kg
Win	(United States) Greg Wojciechowski			1976-03-01	1976 World Cup	(United States) Toledo, Ohio	Toledo Field House
Win	(Iran) R. Sookhtsarat	Decision	4–2	1976-02-29	1976 World Cup	(United States) Toledo, Ohio	Toledo Field House
Win	(Canada) Steve Daniar	—N/a	—N/a	1976-02-29	1976 World Cup	(United States) Toledo, Ohio	Toledo Field House
1975 European Champion at 100kg
Loss	(East Germany) Harald Büttner	—N/a	—N/a	1975-05-01	1975 European Championship	(West Germany) Ludwigshafen	
Win	(People's Republic of Bulgaria) Dimo Kostov	—N/a	—N/a	1975-05-01	1975 European Championship	(West Germany) Ludwigshafen	
Win	(Polish People's Republic) Edward Żmudziejewski	—N/a	—N/a	1975-05-01	1975 European Championship	(West Germany) Ludwigshafen	
Win	(Czechoslovakia) Petr Drozda	—N/a	—N/a	1975-05-01	1975 European Championship	(West Germany) Ludwigshafen	
1974 European Silver Medalist at 100kg
Loss	(East Germany) Harald Büttner	—N/a	—N/a	1974-06-24	1974 European Championship	(Spain) Madrid	Palacio de Deportes
Win	(United States)			1974-04-05	U.S.—Soviet all-star series Olympic freestyle wrestling six-city tour	(United States) Alexandria, Virginia	
Win	(United States) Jim Duschen	Fall	>3:00	1974-04-02	U.S.—Soviet all-star series Olympic freestyle wrestling six-city tour	(United States) Chattanooga, Tennessee	University of Tennessee Arena
Win	(United States) Buck Deadrich	Fall	8:41	1974-03-30	U.S.—Soviet all-star series Olympic freestyle wrestling six-city tour	(United States) Berkeley, California	Harmon Gym
Win	(United States) Larry Amundson	Fall	2:48	1974-03-27	U.S.—Soviet all-star series Olympic freestyle wrestling six-city tour	(United States) San Diego, California	Peterson Gym
Guest	Soviet wrestling clinic demonstration			1974-03-23	U.S.—Soviet all-star series Olympic freestyle wrestling six-city tour	(United States) Long Beach, California	Long Beach State Gym
Win	(United States) Buck Deadrich	Fall	>3:00	1974-03-22	U.S.—Soviet all-star series Olympic freestyle wrestling six-city tour	(United States) Long Beach, California	Long Beach Arena
Win	(United States) Buck Deadrich	Fall	2:34	1974-03-19	U.S.—Soviet all-star series Olympic freestyle wrestling six-city tour	(United States) New York City	Felt Forum
1973 World Champion at 100kg
Win	(United States) Buck Deadrich	Fall	>6:00	1973-09-06	1973 World Championship	(Iran) Tehran	Aryamehr Indoor Stadium
Win	(Hungarian People's Republic) József Csatári	Fall		1973-09-09	1973 World Championship	(Iran) Tehran	Aryamehr Indoor Stadium
Win	(People's Republic of Bulgaria) Dimitar Nekov	Fall	—N/a	1973-09-06	1973 World Championship	(Iran) Tehran	Aryamehr Indoor Stadium
1973 World University Games Champion at 100kg
Win	(United States) Buck Deadrich	—N/a	—N/a	1973-08-15	1973 World University Games	(Soviet Union) Moscow	Lenin Palace of Sports
Win	(People's Republic of Bulgaria) Dimitar Stankov	—N/a	—N/a	1973-08-15	1973 World University Games	(Soviet Union) Moscow	Lenin Palace of Sports
Win	(United States) Henk Schenk	Decision	6–3	1973-06-01	U.S.—Soviet all-star series Olympic freestyle wrestling four-city tour	(United States) New York City	Felt Forum
Win	(United States) Nick Curollo	Fall	1:04	1973-05-30	U.S.—Soviet all-star series Olympic freestyle wrestling four-city tour	(United States) Brockport, New York	Brockport State Gym
Win	(United States) Greg Wojciechowski	Decision	3–1	1973-05-26	U.S.—Soviet all-star series Olympic freestyle wrestling four-city tour	(United States) Columbus, Ohio	St. John Arena
Win	(United States) Russell Hellickson	Default (9–0)	>6:00	1973-05-23	U.S.—Soviet all-star series Olympic freestyle wrestling four-city tour	(United States) Madison, Wisconsin	Wisconsin Field House
1973 World Cup Winner at 100kg
Win	(United States) Russell Hellickson	Fall	1:56	1973-05-20	1973 World Cup	(United States) Toledo, Ohio	Toledo Field House
Win	(Canada) Claude Pilon	Fall	0:17	1973-05-19	1973 World Cup	(United States) Toledo, Ohio	Toledo Field House
Win	(Japan) Shizuo Yada	Fall		1973-05-19	1973 World Cup	(United States) Toledo, Ohio	Toledo Field House
1972 Olympic Gold Medalist at 100kg
Win	(Hungarian People's Republic) József Csatári	Fall	2:04	1972-08-31	1972 Summer Olympics	(West Germany) Munich	Messe München
Win	(Mongolian People's Republic) Khorloo Bayanmunkh	Fall	5:21	1972-08-31	1972 Summer Olympics	(West Germany) Munich	Messe München
Win	(Socialist Republic of Romania) Enache Panait	Fall	1:47	1972-08	1972 Summer Olympics	(West Germany) Munich	Messe München
Win	(Iran) Abolfazl Anvari	Fall	2:58	1972-08	1972 Summer Olympics	(West Germany) Munich	Messe München
Win	(Canada) Harry Geris	Fall	2:20	1972-08	1972 Summer Olympics	(West Germany) Munich	Messe München
Win	(East Germany) Gerd Bachmann	Fall	2:11	1972-08	1972 Summer Olympics	(West Germany) Munich	Messe München
Win	(Switzerland) Bruno Jutzeler	Fall	0:27	1972-08-27	1972 Summer Olympics	(West Germany) Munich	Messe München
1972 European Champion at 100kg
Win	(People's Republic of Bulgaria) Vasil Todorov	Fall	—N/a	1972-04-24	1972 European Championship	(Polish People's Republic) Katowice	Spodek Arena
Win	(East Germany) Gerd Bachmann	Fall	—N/a	1972-04-24	1972 European Championship	(Polish People's Republic) Katowice	Spodek Arena
Win	(Socialist Republic of Romania) Enache Panait	Fall	—N/a	1972-04-24	1972 European Championship	(Polish People's Republic) Katowice	Spodek Arena
1970 European Silver Medalist at 100kg
Loss	(Turkey) Ahmet Ayık	—N/a	—N/a	1970-06-09	1970 European Championship	(East Germany) East Berlin	
Win	(People's Republic of Bulgaria) Vasil Todorov	Fall	—N/a	1970-06-09	1970 European Championship	(East Germany) East Berlin	
Win	(East Germany) Gerd Bachmann	Fall	—N/a	1970-06-09	1970 European Championship	(East Germany) East Berlin	
Win	(Socialist Republic of Romania) Enache Panait	Fall	—N/a	1970-06-09	1970 European Championship	(East Germany) East Berlin	
Win	(Czechoslovakia) Karel Engel	Fall	—N/a	1970-06-09	1970 European Championship	(East Germany) East Berlin	

== Death and legacy ==
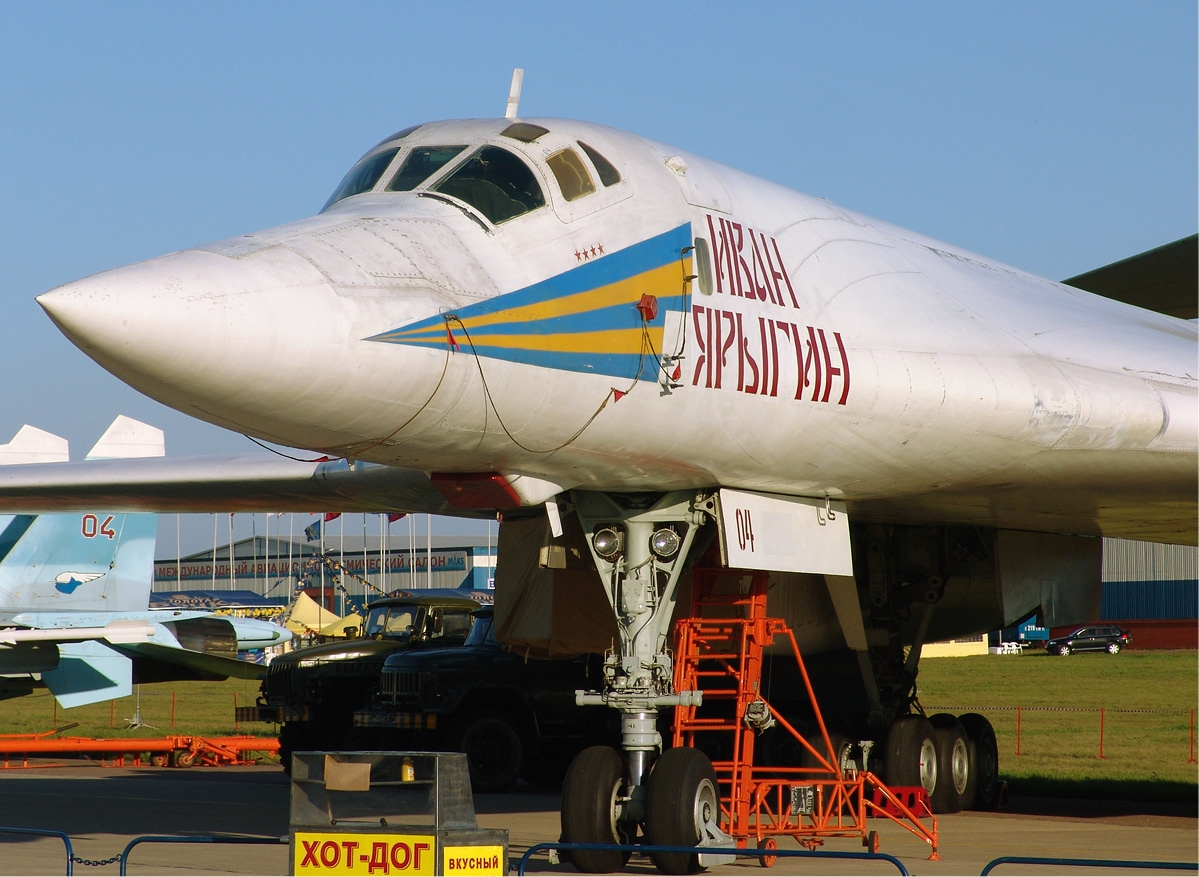
The Russian Tupolev Tu-160 strategic bomber named after Yarygin

Yarygin was killed in a car crash in 1997, crashing his car into a roadside-parked heavy truck. Earlier in 1990, an annual wrestling tournament in his honor has been initiated in Krasnoyarsk, the city where he lived since 1966; in 1998 a sports venue in Krasnoyarsk has been renamed into the Ivan Yarygin Sports Palace, and in March 2002 his monument was opened in the city. His other monuments were installed in Moscow in 1998, in Stavropol Krai (near the place of his death) in 2012, and in Abakan in 2013. A secondary school and a wrestling complex in Moscow are named after Yarygin. In 2010 Yarygin was inducted into the FILA International Wrestling Hall of Fame.

== Books ==
- Yarygin I. S. (1989) Ты выходишь на ковер. Moscow. ISBN 5-900845-02-8
- Yarygin I. S. (1995) Суровые мужские игры. Krasnoyarsk. ISBN 5-7479-0642-9

Olympic Games
Preceded by Aleksandr Medved	Flagbearer for Soviet Union (closing ceremony); Montreal 1976 (with Vasily Alekseyev)	Succeeded by Nikolay Balboshin
