= Wrestling at the 1972 Summer Olympics – Men's freestyle 100 kg =

Men's freestyle 100 kg at the Games of the XX Olympiad
- Venue: Messe München
- Dates: 27–31 August 1972
- Competitors: 16 from 16 nations

Medalists
| 1st place, gold medalist(s) | | Ivan Yarygin | Soviet Union |
| 2nd place, silver medalist(s) | | Khorloogiin Bayanmönkh | Mongolia |
| 3rd place, bronze medalist(s) | | József Csatári | Hungary |

The Men's Freestyle 100 kg at the 1972 Summer Olympics as part of the wrestling program at the Fairgrounds, Judo and Wrestling Hall.

== Medalists ==
| Gold | Ivan Yarygin; Soviet Union |
| Silver | Khorloogiin Bayanmönkh; Mongolia |
| Bronze | József Csatári; Hungary |

== Tournament results ==
The competition used a form of negative points tournament, with negative points given for any result short of a fall. Accumulation of 6 negative points eliminated the wrestler. When only two or three wrestlers remain, a special final round is used to determine the order of the medals.

Legend

- DNA — Did not appear
- TPP — Total penalty points
- MPP — Match penalty points

Penalties

- 0 — Won by Fall, Passivity, Injury and Forfeit
- 0.5 — Won by Technical Superiority
- 1 — Won by Points
- 2 — Draw
- 2.5 — Draw, Passivity
- 3 — Lost by Points
- 3.5 — Lost by Technical Superiority
- 4 — Lost by Fall, Passivity, Injury and Forfeit

=== Round 1 ===
| TPP | MPP | | Time | | MPP | TPP |
|---|---|---|---|---|---|---|
| 1 | 1 | Vasil Todorov (BUL) | | Gerd Bachmann (GDR) | 3 | 3 |
| 0 | 0 | Ivan Yarygin (URS) | 0:27 | Bruno Jutzeler (SUI) | 4 | 4 |
| 4 | 4 | Shizuo Yada (JPN) | 1:24 | Harry Geris (CAN) | 0 | 0 |
| 0 | 0 | Enache Panait (ROU) | 5:08 | Robert N'Diaye (SEN) | 4 | 4 |
| 1 | 1 | Abolfazl Anvari (IRI) | | Karel Engel (TCH) | 3 | 3 |
| 1 | 1 | Khorloogiin Bayanmönkh (MGL) | | Alfons Hecher (FRG) | 3 | 3 |
| 3 | 3 | Henk Schenk (USA) | | József Csatári (HUN) | 1 | 1 |
| 1 | 1 | Ryszard Długosz (POL) | | Julio Tamussin (ITA) | 3 | 3 |
| 0 | | Alaattin Yıldırım (TUR) | | Bye | | |

=== Round 2 ===
| TPP | MPP | | Time | | MPP | TPP |
|---|---|---|---|---|---|---|
| 4 | 4 | Alaattin Yıldırım (TUR) | 0:00 | Vasil Todorov (BUL) | 0 | 1 |
| 7 | 4 | Gerd Bachmann (GDR) | 2:11 | Ivan Yarygin (URS) | 0 | 0 |
| 4 | 0 | Bruno Jutzeler (SUI) | 4:20 | Shizuo Yada (JPN) | 4 | 8 |
| 3 | 3 | Harry Geris (CAN) | | Enache Panait (ROU) | 1 | 1 |
| 8 | 4 | Robert N'Diaye (SEN) | 2:09 | Abolfazl Anvari (IRI) | 0 | 1 |
| 7 | 4 | Karel Engel (TCH) | 1:32 | Khorloogiin Bayanmönkh (MGL) | 0 | 1 |
| 4 | 1 | Alfons Hecher (FRG) | | Henk Schenk (USA) | 3 | 6 |
| 1 | 0 | József Csatári (HUN) | 8:28 | Ryszard Długosz (POL) | 4 | 5 |
| 3 | | Julio Tamussin (ITA) | | Bye | | |

=== Round 3 ===
| TPP | MPP | | Time | | MPP | TPP |
|---|---|---|---|---|---|---|
| 6.5 | 3.5 | Julio Tamussin (ITA) | | Vasil Todorov (BUL) | 0.5 | 1.5 |
| 0 | 0 | Ivan Yarygin (URS) | 2:20 | Harry Geris (CAN) | 4 | 7 |
| 8 | 4 | Bruno Jutzeler (SUI) | 7:42 | Enache Panait (ROU) | 0 | 1 |
| 5 | 4 | Abolfazl Anvari (IRI) | 2:04 | Khorloogiin Bayanmönkh (MGL) | 0 | 1 |
| 7 | 3 | Alfons Hecher (FRG) | | József Csatári (HUN) | 1 | 2 |
| 5 | | Ryszard Długosz (POL) | | Bye | | |
| 4 | | Alaattin Yıldırım (TUR) | | DNA | | |

=== Round 4 ===
| TPP | MPP | | Time | | MPP | TPP |
|---|---|---|---|---|---|---|
| 7 | 2 | Ryszard Długosz (POL) | | Vasil Todorov (BUL) | 2 | 3.5 |
| 0 | 0 | Ivan Yarygin (URS) | 2:58 | Abolfazl Anvari (IRI) | 4 | 9 |
| 5 | 4 | Enache Panait (ROU) | 4:27 | Khorloogiin Bayanmönkh (MGL) | 0 | 1 |
| 2 | | József Csatári (HUN) | | Bye | | |

=== Round 5 ===
| TPP | MPP | | Time | | MPP | TPP |
|---|---|---|---|---|---|---|
| 2 | 0 | József Csatári (HUN) | 8:56 | Vasil Todorov (BUL) | 4 | 7.5 |
| 0 | 0 | Ivan Yarygin (URS) | 1:47 | Enache Panait (ROU) | 4 | 9 |
| 1 | | Khorloogiin Bayanmönkh (MGL) | | Bye | | |

=== Final ===
Results from the preliminary round are carried forward into the final (shown in yellow).

| TPP | MPP | | Time | | MPP | TPP |
|---|---|---|---|---|---|---|
| | 1 | Khorloogiin Bayanmönkh (MGL) | | József Csatári (HUN) | 3 | |
| | 0 | Ivan Yarygin (URS) | 5:21 | Khorloogiin Bayanmönkh (MGL) | 4 | 5 |
| 7 | 4 | József Csatári (HUN) | 2:04 | Ivan Yarygin (URS) | 0 | 0 |

== Final standings ==
1. Ivan Yarygin (URS)
2. Khorloogiin Bayanmönkh (MGL)
3. József Csatári (HUN)
4. Vasil Todorov (BUL)
5. Enache Panait (ROU)
6. Ryszard Długosz (POL)
