= Wrestling at the 1976 Summer Olympics – Men's freestyle 100 kg =

Men's freestyle 100 kg at the Games of the XXI Olympiad
- Venue: Maurice Richard Arena
- Dates: 27–31 July 1976
- Competitors: 15 from 15 nations

Medalists
1st place, gold medalist(s)		Ivan Yarygin	Soviet Union
2nd place, silver medalist(s)		Russell Hellickson	United States
3rd place, bronze medalist(s)		Dimo Kostov	Bulgaria

The Men's Freestyle 100 kg at the 1976 Summer Olympics as part of the wrestling program were held at the Maurice Richard Arena.

== Medalists ==
Gold	Ivan Yarygin; Soviet Union
Silver	Russell Hellickson; United States
Bronze	Dimo Kostov; Bulgaria

== Tournament results ==
The competition used a form of negative points tournament, with negative points given for any result short of a fall. Accumulation of 6 negative points eliminated the loser wrestler. When only three wrestlers remain, a special final round is used to determine the order of the medals.

Legend

- TF — Won by Fall
- IN — Won by Opponent Injury
- DQ — Won by Passivity
- D1 — Won by Passivity, the winner is passive too
- D2 — Both wrestlers lost by Passivity
- FF — Won by Forfeit
- DNA — Did not appear
- TPP — Total penalty points
- MPP — Match penalty points

Penalties

- 0 — Won by Fall, Technical Superiority, Passivity, Injury and Forfeit
- 0.5 — Won by Points, 8-11 points difference
- 1 — Won by Points, 1-7 points difference
- 2 — Won by Passivity, the winner is passive too
- 3 — Lost by Points, 1-7 points difference
- 3.5 — Lost by Points, 8-11 points difference
- 4 — Lost by Fall, Technical Superiority, Passivity, Injury and Forfeit

=== Round 1 ===
TPP	MPP		Score		MPP	TPP
3	3	Reza Soukhteh-Saraei (IRI)	6 - 8	Kazuo Shimizu (JPN)	1	1
0	0	Russell Hellickson (USA)	TF / 2:35	Keith Peache (GBR)	4	4
4	4	Steve Daniar (CAN)	TF / 2:44	Dimo Kostov (BUL)	0	0
3	3	Enache Panaite (ROU)	3 - 5	Khorloogiin Bayanmönkh (MGL)	1	1
3.5	3.5	Harald Büttner (GDR)	5 - 13	Ivan Yarygin (URS)	0.5	0.5
4	4	Tore Hem (NOR)	TF / 3:18	Petr Drozda (TCH)	0	0
0	0	Daniel Verník (ARG)	TF / 0:17	Robert N'Diaye (SEN)	4	4
0		Hans-Peter Stratz (FRG)		Bye		

=== Round 2 ===
TPP	MPP		Score		MPP	TPP
3	3	Hans-Peter Stratz (FRG)	4 - 10	Reza Soukhteh-Saraei (IRI)	1	4
5	4	Kazuo Shimizu (JPN)	DQ / 6:52	Russell Hellickson (USA)	0	0
7.5	3.5	Keith Peache (GBR)	6 - 14	Steve Daniar (CAN)	0.5	4.5
0	0	Dimo Kostov (BUL)	TF / 4:05	Enache Panaite (ROU)	4	7
2	1	Khorloogiin Bayanmönkh (MGL)	9 - 5	Harald Büttner (GDR)	3	6.5
0.5	0	Ivan Yarygin (URS)	TF / 1:26	Daniel Verník (ARG)	4	4
0	0	Petr Drozda (TCH)	TF / 2:48	Robert N'Diaye (SEN)	4	8
4		Tore Hem (NOR)		DNA		

=== Round 3 ===
TPP	MPP		Score		MPP	TPP
7	4	Hans-Peter Stratz (FRG)	TF / 2:58	Kazuo Shimizu (JPN)	0	5
8	4	Reza Soukhteh-Saraei (IRI)	TF / 8:26	Russell Hellickson (USA)	0	0
8.5	4	Steve Daniar (CAN)	FF	Khorloogiin Bayanmönkh (MGL)	0	2
3.5	3.5	Dimo Kostov (BUL)	5 - 16	Ivan Yarygin (URS)	0.5	1
0	0	Petr Drozda (TCH)	TF / 2:19	Daniel Verník (ARG)	4	8

=== Round 4 ===
TPP	MPP		Score		MPP	TPP
8	3	Kazuo Shimizu (JPN)	6 - 9	Dimo Kostov (BUL)	1	4.5
0.5	0.5	Russell Hellickson (USA)	14 - 5	Khorloogiin Bayanmönkh (MGL)	3.5	5.5
1	0	Ivan Yarygin (URS)	TF / 5:30	Petr Drozda (TCH)	4	4

=== Round 5 ===
TPP	MPP		Score		MPP	TPP
3.5	3	Russell Hellickson (USA)	13 - 19	Ivan Yarygin (URS)	1	2
4.5	0	Dimo Kostov (BUL)	TF / 3:53	Petr Drozda (TCH)	4	8
5.5		Khorloogiin Bayanmönkh (MGL)		DNA		

=== Final ===
Results from the preliminary round are carried forward into the final (shown in yellow).

TPP	MPP		Score		MPP	TPP
	3.5	Dimo Kostov (BUL)	5 - 16	Ivan Yarygin (URS)	0.5	
	3	Russell Hellickson (USA)	13 - 19	Ivan Yarygin (URS)	1	1.5
4	1	Russell Hellickson (USA)	12 - 6	Dimo Kostov (BUL)	3	6.5

== Final standings ==
1. Ivan Yarygin (URS)
2. Russell Hellickson (USA)
3. Dimo Kostov (BUL)
4. Petr Drozda (TCH)
5. Khorloogiin Bayanmönkh (MGL)
6. Kazuo Shimizu (JPN)
7. Hans-Peter Stratz (FRG)
8. Daniel Verník (ARG)
