= Wrestling at the 1968 Summer Olympics – Men's freestyle 97 kg =

Men's freestyle light heavyweight at the Games of the XIX Olympiad
- Venue: Insurgentes Ice Rink
- Date: 17 – 20 October 1968
- Competitors: 16 from 16 nations

Medalists
1st place, gold medalist(s)		Ahmet Ayık	Turkey
2nd place, silver medalist(s)		Shota Lomidze	Soviet Union
3rd place, bronze medalist(s)		József Csatári	Hungary

The Men's Freestyle light heavyweight at the 1968 Summer Olympics was part of the wrestling program were held at the Insurgentes Ice Rink from October 17 to October 20. The light heavyweight allowed wrestlers up to 97 kilograms.

== Tournament results ==
The competition used a form of negative points tournament, with negative points given for any result short of a fall. Accumulation of 6 negative points eliminated the wrestler. When only two or three wrestlers remain, a special final round is used to determine the order of the medals.

Legend

- TF — Won by Fall
- DQ — Won by Passivity or forfeit
- D2 — Both wrestlers lost by Passivity
- DNA — Did not appear

Penalties

- 0 — Won by Fall and Disqualification
- 0.5 — Won by Technical Superiority
- 1 — Won by Points
- 2 — Draw
- 2.5 — Draw, Passivity
- 3 — Lost by Points
- 3.5 — Lost by Technical Superiority
- 4 — Lost by Fall and Disqualification

=== 1st round ===
TPP	MPP		Score		MPP	TPP
1	1	Jess Lewis (USA)		Gerd Bachmann (GDR)	3	3
1	1	Shunichi Kawano (JPN)		Nicolae Neguț (ROU)	3	3
0	0	Ryszard Długosz (POL)	TF / 1:33	Alexis Nihon Jr. (BAH)	4	4
3.5	3.5	Edward Millard (CAN)		Khorloogiin Bayanmönkh (MGL)	0.5	0.5
1	1	József Csatári (HUN)		Peter Jutzeler (SUI)	3	3
3.5	3.5	Heinz Kiehl (FRG)		Shota Lomidze (URS)	0.5	0.5
0.5	0.5	Moslem Eskandar (IRI)		Victor Vernik (ARG)	3.5	3.5
3	3	Said Mustafov (BUL)		Ahmet Ayık (TUR)	1	1

=== 2nd round ===
TPP	MPP		Score		MPP	TPP
2	1	Jess Lewis (USA)		Shunichi Kawano (JPN)	3	4
5	2	Gerd Bachmann (GDR)		Nicolae Neguț (ROU)	2	5
3	3	Ryszard Długosz (POL)		Edward Millard (CAN)	1	4.5
8	4	Alexis Nihon Jr. (BAH)	TF / 1:17	Khorloogiin Bayanmönkh (MGL)	0	0.5
4	1	Peter Jutzeler (SUI)		Moslem Eskandar (IRI)	3	3.5
4	3	József Csatári (HUN)		Shota Lomidze (URS)	1	1.5
7.5	4	Victor Vernik (ARG)	TF / 5:16	Said Mustafov (BUL)	0	3
		Ahmet Ayık (TUR)	DNA	Heinz Kiehl (FRG)		

=== 3rd round ===
TPP	MPP		Score		MPP	TPP
4	2	Jess Lewis (USA)		Ahmet Ayık (TUR)	2	4
6	1	Gerd Bachmann (GDR)		Shunichi Kawano (JPN)	3	7
8	3	Nicolae Neguț (ROU)		Ryszard Długosz (POL)	1	4
8.5	4	Edward Millard (CAN)	TF / 9:02	József Csatári (HUN)	0	4
1.5	1	Khorloogiin Bayanmönkh (MGL)		Peter Jutzeler (SUI)	3	7
2.5	1	Shota Lomidze (URS)		Moslem Eskandar (IRI)	3	6.5
		Said Mustafov (BUL)		Bye		

=== 4th round ===
TPP	MPP		Score		MPP	TPP
7	3	Jess Lewis (USA)		Said Mustafov (BUL)	1	4
7	3	Ryszard Długosz (POL)		Ahmet Ayık (TUR)	1	4
5	1	Khorloogiin Bayanmönkh (MGL)		József Csatári (HUN)	3	4.5
		Shota Lomidze (URS)		Bye		

=== 5th round ===
TPP	MPP		Score		MPP	TPP
4	0	Ahmet Ayık (TUR)	TF / 1:02	Khorloogiin Bayanmönkh (MGL)	4	8.5
5	2.5	Shota Lomidze (URS)		Said Mustafov (BUL)	2.5	6.5
		József Csatári (HUN)		Bye		

=== Final rounds ===
==== First round robin bout ====
TPP	MPP		Score		MPP	TPP
3	3	József Csatári (HUN)		Shota Lomidze (URS)	1	1
		Ahmet Ayık (TUR)		Bye		

==== Second round robin bout ====
TPP	MPP		Score		MPP	TPP
7	4	József Csatári (HUN)	TF / 10:12	Ahmet Ayık (TUR)	0	0
		Shota Lomidze (URS)		Bye		

==== Third round robin bout ====
TPP	MPP		Score		MPP	TPP
3	2	Shota Lomidze (URS)		Ahmet Ayık (TUR)	2	2

== Final standings ==
1. Ahmet Ayık (TUR)
2. Shota Lomidze (URS)
3. József Csatári (HUN)
4. Said Mustafov (BUL)
5. Khorloogiin Bayanmönkh (MGL)
6. Jess Lewis (USA)

== Sources ==
- Trueblood, Beatrice, ed. (1969). Official Report of the Organizing Committee of the Games of the XIX Olympiad Mexico 1968 (Volume 3) (PDF). Vol. 3. pp. 337, 723–724. Archived from the original (PDF) on April 28, 2015.
