= Kösedağ =

Kösedağ or Kosedag may refer to:

- Mount Kösedağ (Ağrı), a mountain in the province of Ağrı, Turkey
- Mount Kösedağ (Sivas), a mountain in the province of Sivas
  - Battle of Köse Dağ, a war between the Anatolian Seljuk State and the Mongolian empire
