= Ahmet Ayık =

Turkish freestyle wrestler

Personal information
- Nationality: Turkish
- Born: August 31, 1938 (age 87) Sivas, Turkey

Sport
- Sport: Wrestling
- Event: Freestyle
- Coached by: Yaşar Doğu
Medal record
Men's freestyle wrestling
Representing Turkey
Olympic Games
Gold medal – first place	1968 Mexico City	97 kg
Silver medal – second place	1964 Tokyo	97 kg
World Championships
Gold medal – first place	1965 Manchester	97 kg
Gold medal – first place	1967 New Delhi	97 kg
Silver medal – second place	1966 Toledo	97 kg
European Championships
Gold medal – first place	1967 Istanbul	97 kg
Gold medal – first place	1970 East Berlin	97 kg
Silver medal – second place	1966 Karlsruhe	97 kg
Mediterranean Games
Gold medal – first place	1963 Naples	97 kg
Balkan Championships
Gold medal – first place	1964 Constanţa	97 kg
Adriatic Cup
Silver medal – second place	1962 Belgrade	87 kg
International Tournament
Gold medal – first place	1965 Tbilisi	97 kg

Ahmet Ayık (born March 31, 1938) is a Turkish former World champion of Karachay origin and Olympic medalist sports wrestler in the Light heavyweight class (97 kg) and a sports executive. He won the silver medal at the 1964 Olympics in Men's Freestyle wrestling and the gold medal at the 1968 Olympics.

== Biography ==
He was born in 1938 in Eskiköy, a village of Doğanşar district in Sivas Province in the eastern part of Central Anatolia as the sixth child of a poor family. Ahmet Ayık lost four of his siblings during the 1939 Erzincan earthquake. He began wrestling as a youngster in the traditional Turkish Karakucak Güreşi.

At age 13, he followed his brother to Istanbul, and joined first Şişli Youth Club and later Beşiktaş JK for sports wrestling. After winning the title of Turkish champion, he was admitted to the national team in 1962, and received training by the renowned wrestlers such as Yaşar Doğu, Celal Atik, Nasuh Akar and Bayram Şit. Besides his medals at two Olympic Games, Ahmet Ayık became two times World champion, two times European champion and won several titles at various international competitions. Ahmet Ayık defeated the legendary wrestlers like Gholamreza Takhti from Iran and Alexander Medved of Soviet/Belarus. He is also first and one of only two people to ever defeat Soviet wrestler Ivan Yarygin at an international competition.

He retired from the active sports after his second title of European champion in 1970. In 1980, Ahmet Ayık co-founded the Turkish Wrestling Foundation and became 1993 the chairman of this organization. Between 1996 and 2000, he served as the president of the Turkish Wrestling Federation. He is also a member of the board of International Wrestling Federation (FILA) since 1998.

Ahmet Ayık has been married since 1958 and has three children.
