= 1971 World Wrestling Championships – Men's freestyle 100 kg =

Men's freestyle 100 kg at the 1971 World Championships
- Dates: 27 August 1971
- Competitors: 16 from 16 nations

Medalists
gold medal	Shota Lomidze	Soviet Union
silver medal	Khorloogiin Bayanmönkh	Mongolia
bronze medal	Vasil Todorov	Bulgaria

The Men's Freestyle 100 kg at the 1971 World Wrestling Championships were held at the Vasil Levski National Stadium, Sofia.

== Tournament results ==
The competition used a form of negative points tournament, with negative points given for any result short of a fall. Accumulation of 6 negative points eliminated the wrestler. When only two or three wrestlers remain, a special final round is used to determine the order of the medals.

Legend

- TF — Won by Fall
- DQ — Won by Passivity or forfeit
- D2 — Both wrestlers lost by Passivity
- DNA — Did not appear

Penalties

- 0 — Won by Fall and Disqualification
- 0.5 — Won by Technical Superiority
- 1 — Won by Points
- 2 — Draw
- 2.5 — Draw, Passivity
- 3 — Lost by Points
- 3.5 — Lost by Technical Superiority
- 4 — Lost by Fall and Disqualification

=== 1st round ===
TPP	MPP		Score		MPP	TPP
4	4	Zingg (SUI)	TF	Vernik (ARG)	0	0
3	3	Hecher (FRG)		Yilmaz (TUR)	1	1
2.5	2.5	Кristoff (USA)	Draw	Długosz (POL)	2.5	2.5
1	1	Vasil Todorov (BUL)		Bachmann (GDR)	3	3
0	0	Khorloogiin Bayanmönkh (MGL)	TF	Anvari (IRI)	4	4
4	4	Aschuri (ISR)	TF	Yada (JPN)	0	0
0	0	Czatari (HUN)	TF	Khalid (IRQ)	4	4
4	4	Panait (ROM)	TF	Shota Lomidze (URS)	0	0

=== 2st round ===
TPP	MPP		Score		MPP	TPP
8	4	Zingg (SUI)	TF	Hecher (FRG)	0	3
4	4	Vernik (ARG)	TF	Yilmaz (TUR)	0	1
5.5	3	Кristoff (USA)		Vasil Todorov (BUL)	1	2
5.5	3	Długosz (POL)		Bachmann (GDR)	1	4
0	0	Khorloogiin Bayanmönkh (MGL)	TF	Aschuri (ISR)	4	8
7	3	Anvari (IRI)		Yada (JPN)	1	1
0	0	Czatari (HUN)	TF	Panait (ROM)	4	8
8	4	Khalid (IRQ)	TF	Shota Lomidze (URS)	0	0

=== 3rd round ===
TPP	MPP		Score		MPP	TPP
7	3	Vernik (ARG)		Hecher (FRG)	1	4
9.5	4	Кristoff (USA)	DQ	Yilmaz (TUR)	4	5
9.5	4	Długosz (POL)	TF	Vasil Todorov (BUL)	0	2
0	0	Khorloogiin Bayanmönkh (MGL)	TF	Bachmann (GDR)	4	8
0	0	Czatari (HUN)	TF	Yada (JPN)	4	5
0	0	Shota Lomidze (URS)	Bye			

=== 4th round ===
TPP	MPP		Score		MPP	TPP
0	0	Shota Lomidze (URS)	TF	Hecher (FRG)	4	8
3	1	Vasil Todorov (BUL)		Yilmaz (TUR)	3	8
0	0	Khorloogiin Bayanmönkh (MGL)	TF	Yada (JPN)	4	9
0	0	Czatari (HUN)	Bye			

=== 5th round ===
TPP	MPP		Score		MPP	TPP
2	2	Khorloogiin Bayanmönkh (MGL)	Draw	Vasil Todorov (BUL)	2	5
4	4	Czatari (HUN)	TF	Shota Lomidze (URS)	0	0

=== 6th round ===
TPP	MPP		Score		MPP	TPP
7	3	Czatari (HUN)		Vasil Todorov (BUL)	1	6
4	2	Khorloogiin Bayanmönkh (MGL)	Draw	Shota Lomidze (URS)	2	2

== Final standings ==
Shota Lomidze of USSR won the gold medal thanks lower number of penalty points. Mongolian wrestler Khorloogiin Bayanmönkh won the silver medal without losing a single match. Vasil Todorov from Bulgaria finished third.

1. Shota Lomidze (URS)
2. Khorloogiin Bayanmönkh (MGL)
3. Vasil Todorov (BUL)
4. József Csatári (HUN)
5. Giyasettin Yilmaz (TUR)
6. Alfons Hecher (FRG)
