= Gölova =

Town in Sivas Province, Turkey

- Municipality
- Location in Turkey Gölova (Turkey Central Anatolia)
- Coordinates: 40°03′44″N 38°36′34″E
- Country: Turkey
- Province: Sivas
- District: Gölova

Government
  - Mayor: Tevfik AYAN (AKP)
- Elevation: 1,342 m (4,403 ft)
- Population (2022): 995
- Time zone: UTC+3 (TRT)
- Website: www.golova.bel.tr

Gölova is a town in Sivas Province of Turkey. It is the seat of Gölova District. Its population is 995 (2022). The mayor is İbrahim Yenidünya (AKP). The name "Gölova" means "lake-plain".

Historically known as Ağvanis, Gölova is located on top of a hill on the edge of the Refahiye plateau and also overlooking the Suşehri plain to the west. To the south are small lakes where water from the Çobanlı Su's tributaries collects. These lakes water a meadow area called Suşehir ("water-city"; not to be confused with the Suşehri plain to the west), which was historically a stopping place for armies and travelers in general.

== History ==
Gölova is likely equivalent to the ancient Roman settlement known as Olotoedariza in the Antonine Itinerary and Aladaleariza in the 4th-century Notitia Dignitatum. This was the base of a cavalry unit called the Ala Rizena. The etymology of both these names, along with the modern name of Ağvanis, may be from the Armenian word ełigi, meaning "marsh".

== See also ==
- Gölova Dam
