= Anniaca =

Town of ancient Pontus

Coordinates: 40°18′45″N 37°51′09″E

Anniaca was a town of ancient Pontus, inhabited during Byzantine times.

Its site is located near Eski Kale, Koyulhisar in Asiatic Turkey.
