= Kılıçkaya Dam =

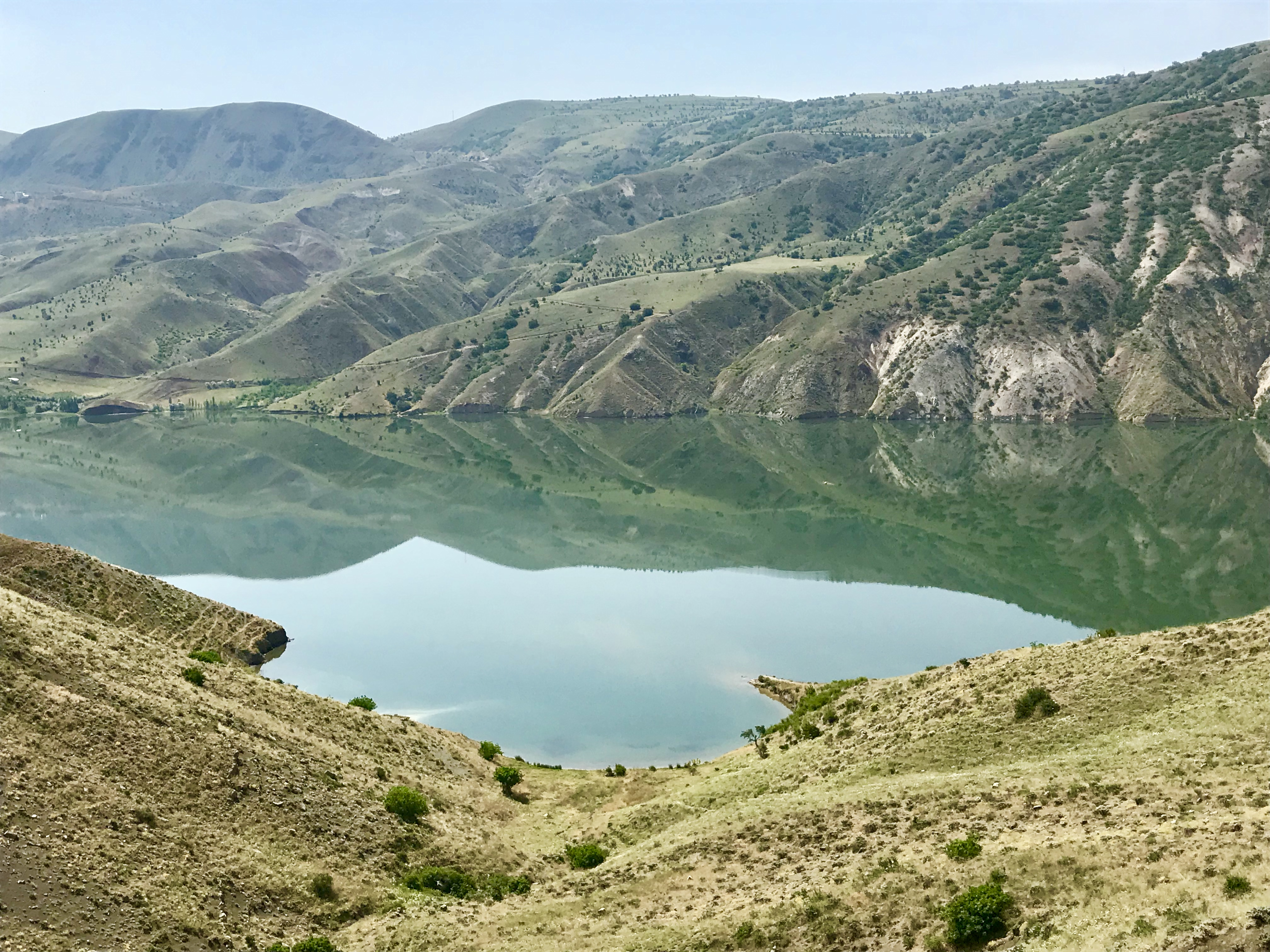
- Interactive map of Kılıçkaya Dam
- Official name: Kılıçkaya Barajı (Turkish)
- Country: Turkey
- Location: Kelkit River, Sivas Province
- Coordinates: 40°14′N 38°11′E
- Purpose: Multi-purpose
- Construction began: 1980
- Opening date: 1989 or 1990
- Operator: Elektrik Uretim AS

Dam and spillways
- Type of dam: Rock-fill dam
- Height (thalweg): 135 m
- Width (crest): 405 m
- Dam volume: 6 900 000 m³
- S pillway volumetric flow rate: 7,800 m³/s

Reservoir
- Total capacity: 1400 billion m³
- Surface area: 64 km²
- Spillway volumetric flow rate: 139 m³/s

Power Station
- Installed capacity: 124 MW
- Annual generation: 332 000 mwh/year

Kılıçkaya Dam is a dam located 25 km north of town of Suşehri 158 km northeast of Sivas city in center east of Turkey and located on the Kelkit, a tributary of the Yeşilırmak River which flows down along a large fault in the north east Anatolia than runs into the Black Sea.

Geology in the river basin, where many landslides can be observed, is of sedimentary formation.
