= Enache =

Enache is a Romanian surname. Notable people with the surname include:

- Ilie Enache (sec. XVII), Romanian noble
- Nicolae Enache, Baron de Cârstea (sec. XVIII), Romanian landowner and noble
- Constantin Enache (1928–2017), Romanian cross-country skier
- Costel Enache (born 1973), Romanian footballer and manager
- Gabriel Enache (born 1990), Romanian footballer
- Ion Enache (born 1947), Romanian sport wrestler
- Stela Enache (born 1950), Romanian easy listening singer
- Toma Enache (born 1970), Romanian film director
- Enache Panait (born 1949), Romanian sport wrestler
- Andreea Enache (born 1995), Romanian Editor-in-chief, founder https://beaute.ro/
