= Hans-Peter Stratz =

German wrestler

Personal information
- Nationality: German
- Born: 20 April 1950 (age 76) Freiburg im Breisgau, Germany

Sport
- Sport: Wrestling

Hans-Peter Stratz (born 20 April 1950) is a German wrestler. He competed in the men's freestyle 100 kg at the 1976 Summer Olympics.
