= Kazuo Shimizu (wrestler) =

Japanese wrestler

Personal information
- Nationality: Japanese
- Born: 26 July 1954 (age 71)

Sport
- Sport: Wrestling

Kazuo Shimizu (清水 一夫, Shimizu Kazuo; born 26 July 1954) is a Japanese wrestler. He competed in the men's freestyle 100 kg at the 1976 Summer Olympics.
