= Robert Diouf =

Senegalese wrestler (1942–2025)

- Diouf during his wrestling career

Personal information
- Born: 3 February 1942 Fadiouth, French Senegal
- Died: 29 August 2025 (aged 83) Joal, Senegal
- Height: 176 cm (5 ft 9 in)
- Weight: 99 kg (218 lb)

Sport
- Country: Senegal
- Sport: Wrestling
- Weight class: Heavyweight

Robert Diouf, also known as Mouhamed N'Diaye (3 February 1942 – 29 August 2025), was a Senegalese wrestler. He won the gold medal at the 1969 African Wrestling Championships and also competed in the 1972 Summer Olympics and in the 1976 Summer Olympics.

== Early life ==
Diouf was born on 3 February 1942 in Fadiouth, Senegal. He grew up in Joal. A member of the Serer people, he started wrestling in the mbappat, traditional tournaments that took place after harvest. At the age of 15, he started participating in regional tournaments and "brilliantly distinguished himself". After moving to Dakar for four years to study mechanics, Diouf returned to wrestling.

== Career ==
Diouf was regarded as one of the greatest wrestlers of his generation in Senegal and became a national icon. He helped popularize professional Senegalese wrestling and had several important fights during his career, including against Mbaye Guèye ("The Tiger of Fass"), which Le Soleil described as marking the "turning point in the history of Senegalese wrestling", as the winner received a prize of one million CFA francs. He lost to Guèye, but in 1970, the next year, defeated him in a rematch. Diouf was also known for his fights against Mamadou Sakho, known as "Double Less" or the "Giant of Malifara". Despite weighing 20 kilograms (44 lb) less than Sakho, Diouf defeated him in freestyle wrestling; Diouf won several years later in a rematch under Senegalese wrestling rules. Distinguished by his "exceptional technique", he competed in 137 fights during his career, compiling a record of 118 wins, seven losses and 12 draws.

Diouf was a member of the national wrestling team. He competed at the 1969 African Wrestling Championships and won the gold medal in the 100 kg Greco-Roman event. Two years later, he won silver in the 100 kg freestyle event at the African Championships. He was selected to represent Senegal at the 1972 Summer Olympics in Munich and was the Senegalese flagbearer at the opening ceremony; competing in the freestyle heavyweight event, he did not medal. Diouf returned to the Olympics in 1976 in Montreal, competing in both the freestyle heavyweight and the Greco-Roman heavyweight, but did not medal.

After retiring from his competitive career, he worked as a self-combat and judo coach for the National Police Academy. He coached several national champions.

== Personal life ==
Diouf was born to a Christian family, but converted and became a Muslim in 1977, taking the name Mouhamed.

Diouf had several sons who competed as wrestlers. He lived in Joal in his later years and died there on 29 August 2025, at the age of 83.
