= Doğanşar District =

District of Sivas Province, Turkey

- District
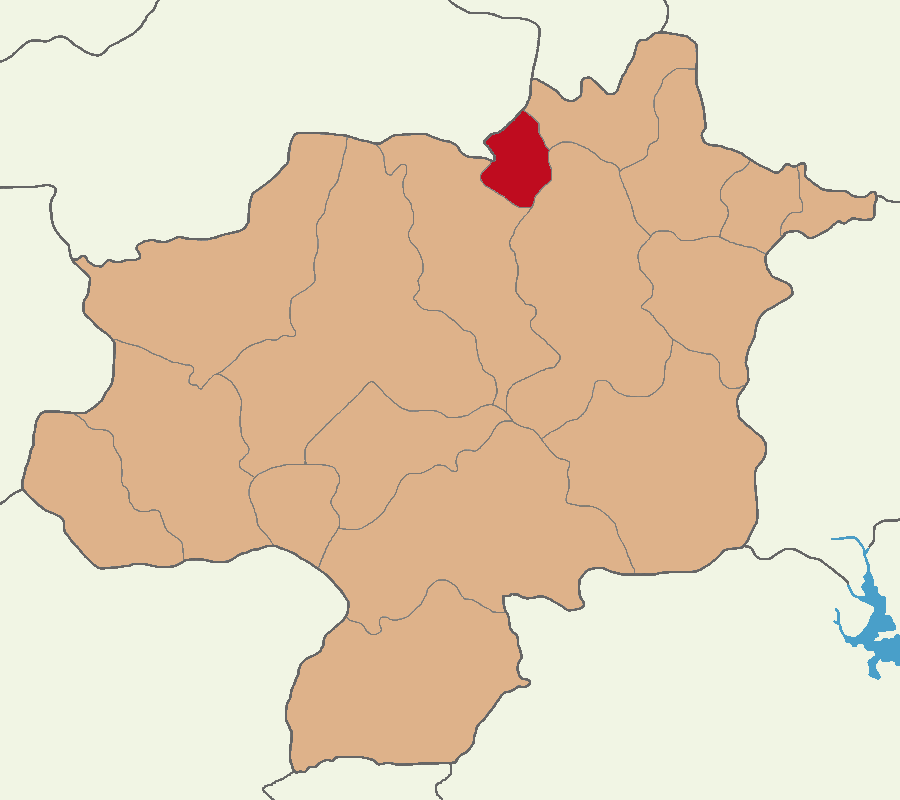
- Map showing Doğanşar District in Sivas Province

- Location in Turkey Doğanşar District (Turkey Central Anatolia)
- Coordinates: 40°13′N 37°32′E
- Country: Turkey
- Province: Sivas
- Seat: Doğanşar

Government
  - Kaymakam: Yunus Emre Yıldız
- Area: 370 km^{2} (140 sq mi)
- Population (2022): 2,704
  - Density: 7.3/km^{2} (19/sq mi)
- Time zone: UTC+3 (TRT)
- Website: www.dogansar.gov.tr

Doğanşar District is a district of the Sivas Province of Turkey. Its seat is the town of Doğanşar. Its area is 370 km^{2}, and its population is 2,704 (2022).

== Composition ==
There is one municipality in Doğanşar District:

- Doğanşar

There are 26 villages in Doğanşar District:

- Alanköy
- Alazlı
- Arslantaş
- Avcıçayı
- Başekin
- Beşağaç
- Boyalı
- Çalıcı
- Çatpınar
- Darıkol
- Ekinciler
- Eskiköy
- Göçüköy
- Içdere
- Karkın
- Kıpçak
- Kozağaç
- Kozlu
- Okçulu
- Ortaköy
- Sarısuvat
- Söbüler
- Tavza
- Ütük
- Yavşancık
- Yeşilçukur
