= Doğanşar =

- Municipality
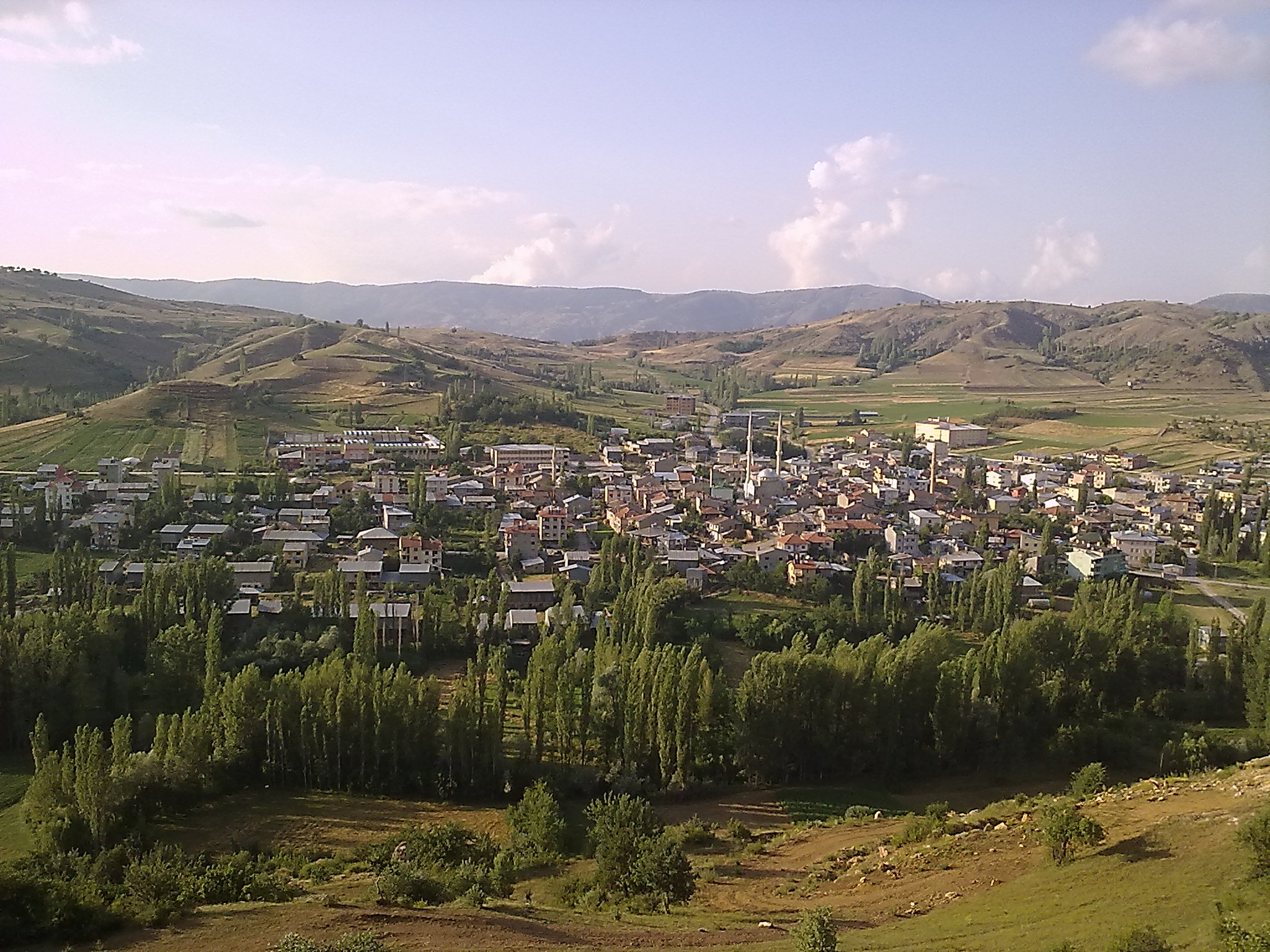

- Location within Turkey Location within Turkey Central Anatolia
- Coordinates: 40°12′56″N 37°32′12″E
- Country: Turkey
- Province: Sivas
- District: Doğanşar

Government
  - Mayor: Halil Balık (MHP)
- Elevation: 1,311 m (4,301 ft)
- Population (2022): 1,202
- Time zone: UTC+3 (TRT)
- Postal code: 58780
- Area code: 0346
- Website: www.dogansar.bel.tr

Doğanşar is a town in Sivas Province of Turkey. It is the seat of Doğanşar District. Its population is 1,202 (2022). The mayor is Halil Balık (MHP).
