= Koyulhisar District =

District of Sivas Province, Turkey

- District
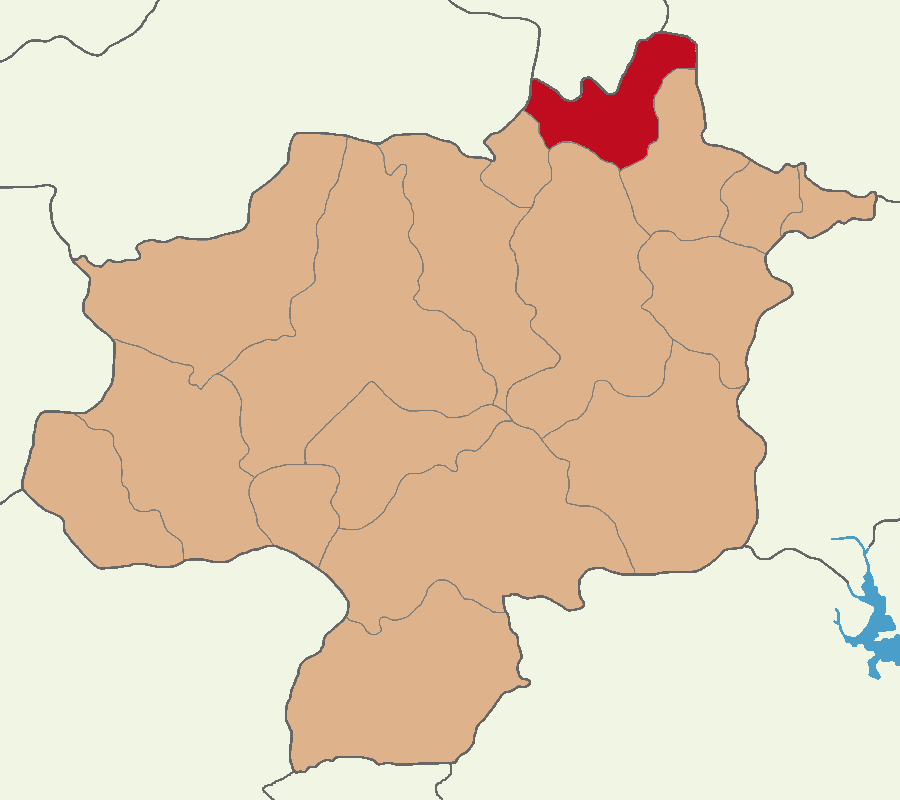
- Map showing Koyulhisar District in Sivas Province

- Location in Turkey Koyulhisar District (Turkey Central Anatolia)
- Coordinates: 40°18′N 37°50′E
- Country: Turkey
- Province: Sivas
- Seat: Koyulhisar

Government
  - Kaymakam: Resul Yıldırım
- Area: 891 km^{2} (344 sq mi)
- Population (2022): 12,183
  - Density: 14/km^{2} (35/sq mi)
- Time zone: UTC+3 (TRT)
- Website: www.koyulhisar.gov.tr

Koyulhisar District is a district of the Sivas Province of Turkey. Its seat is the town of Koyulhisar. Its area is 891 km^{2}, and its population is 12,183 (2022).

== Composition ==
There is one municipality in Koyulhisar District:

- Koyulhisar

There are 44 villages in Koyulhisar District:

- Akseki
- Aksu
- Aydınlar
- Bahçeköy
- Ballıca
- Boyalı
- Bozkuş
- Çandır
- Çaylı
- Çiçeközü
- Çukuroba
- Değirmentaş
- Dilekli
- Ekinözü
- Gökdere
- Gölcük
- Gümüşlü
- Günışık
- Güzelyurt
- Hacıilyas
- İkizyaka
- İskenderşeyh
- Kadife
- Kalebaşı
- Karaçam
- Kavacık
- Kayaören
- Kılıçpınarı
- Kızılelma
- Küplüce
- Kurşunlu
- Ortaköy
- Ortaseki
- Sarıharman
- Sarıkaya
- Sugözü
- Sütlüce
- Taşpınar
- Yağcılar
- Yalnıztepe
- Yeniarslan
- Yenice
- Yeşilyurt
- Yolüstü
