= Mount Kösedağ (Sivas) =

Mountain in Turkey

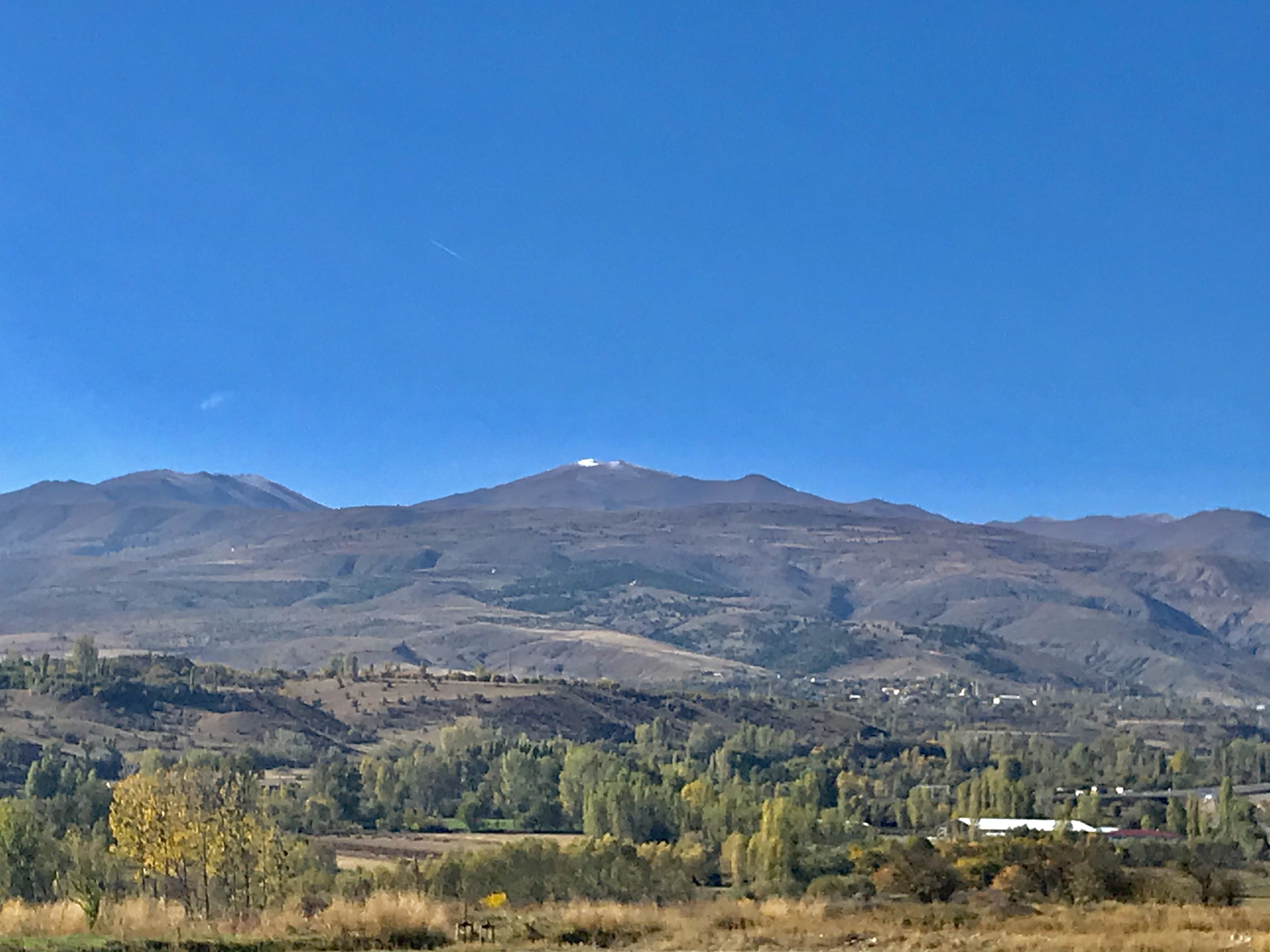
- View of mountain

Highest point
- Elevation: 2,794 m (9,167 ft)
- Coordinates: 40°04′38″N 37°58′18″E

Geography
- Location within Turkey
- Country: Turkey
- Province: Sivas
- District: Suşehri

Mount Kösedağ (Turkish: Kösedağ Dağı) is a mountain range in the Suşehri district of Sivas province. It is known for the Battle of Kösedağ.

== History ==
The battle between the Anatolian Seljuk State and the Mongols, which resulted in the defeat of the Seljuk State and its entry into the Mongol subordination, took place at the foot of the mountain.

== Geology and geomorphology ==
Mount Kösedağ starts just north of Zara district and ends in Suşehri district center in the north.
