= Gölova District =

District of Sivas Province, Turkey

- District
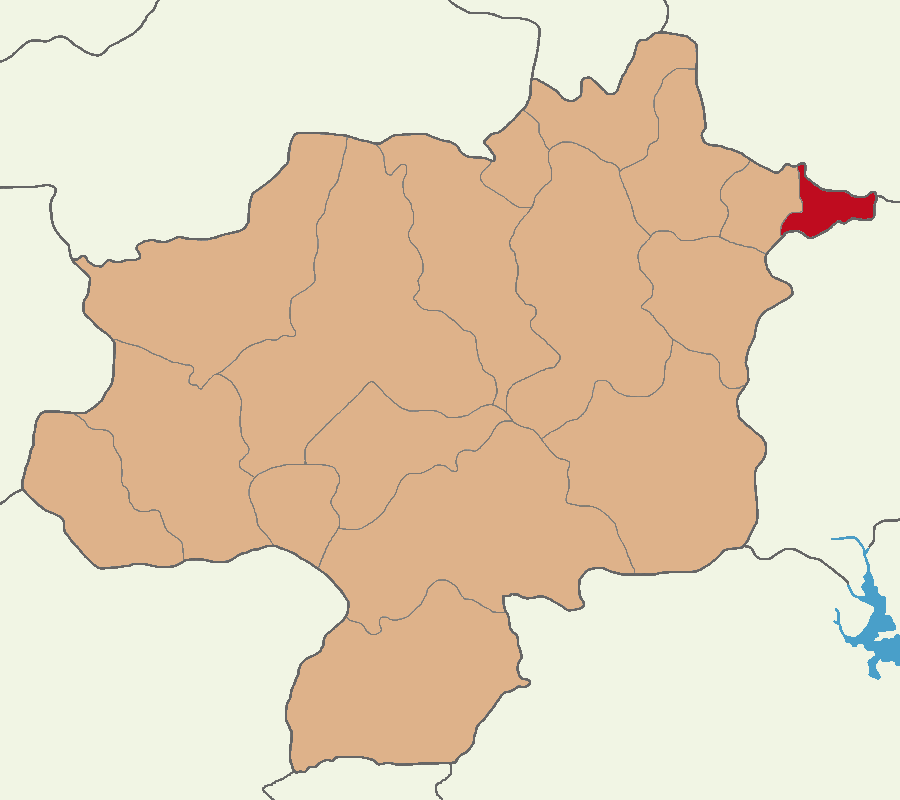
- Map showing Gölova District in Sivas Province

- Location in Turkey Gölova District (Turkey Central Anatolia)
- Coordinates: 40°04′N 38°36′E
- Country: Turkey
- Province: Sivas
- Seat: Gölova

Government
  - Kaymakam: Ahmet Nuri Demir
- Area: 286 km^{2} (110 sq mi)
- Population (2022): 3,246
  - Density: 11/km^{2} (29/sq mi)
- Time zone: UTC+3 (TRT)
- Website: www.golova.gov.tr

Gölova District is a district of the Sivas Province of Turkey. Its seat is the town of Gölova. Its area is 286 km^{2}, and its population is 3,246 (2022).

== Composition ==
There is one municipality in Gölova District:

- Gölova

There are 29 villages in Gölova District:

- Akçataş
- Arslanca
- Aşağıtepecik
- Aydoğdu
- Boğazköy
- Bozat
- Çakırşeyh
- Canköy
- Çataklı
- Çevrecik
- Çobanlı
- Çukuryurt
- Demirkonak
- Dikköy
- Gözlüce
- Gözüküçük
- Günalan
- Güzören
- İlyasköy
- Karaca
- Karayakup
- Okçaören
- Sarıyusuf
- Soğuksu
- Subaşı
- Uluçukur
- Yaylaçayı
- Yukarıtepecik
- Yuvacık
