= Koyulhisar =

- Municipality
- Location in Turkey Koyulhisar (Turkey Central Anatolia)
- Coordinates: 40°18′19″N 37°49′50″E
- Country: Turkey
- Province: Sivas
- District: Koyulhisar

Government
  - Mayor: Bora Karrakulukcu (İYİ)
- Elevation: 970 m (3,180 ft)
- Population (2022): 4,041
- Time zone: UTC+3 (TRT)
- Postal code: 58660
- Area code: 0346
- Website: koyulhisar.bel.tr

Koyulhisar is a town in Sivas Province of Turkey. It is the seat of Koyulhisar District. Its population is 4,041 (2022). The mayor is Bora Karrakulukcu (iYi).

== History ==
The ancient city of Nicopolis in Armenia (v.; Νικόπολις in ancient Greek) stood at this place and rose to Metropolis of Roman Lesser Armenia.

Historically, it has also been known as Koyluhisar and Koyunlu Hisar. This name seemingly hails from the Latin colonia (Roman colony), as it was also the nearby site of Colonia in Armenia, which became important enough to be a suffragan in the Late Roman Province of Armenia Prima, but faded like most in Asia Minor.
