= Russ Hellickson =

American wrestler (born 1948)

Personal information
- Full name: Russell Owen Hellickson
- Born: May 29, 1948 (age 78) Madison, Wisconsin, U.S.

Sport
- Country: United States
- Sport: Wrestling
- Events: Freestyle, Greco-Roman, and Folkstyle
- College team: Wisconsin
- Club: Wisconsin Wrestling Club
- Team: USA
Medal record
Men's freestyle wrestling
Representing United States
Olympic Games
Silver medal – second place	1976 Montreal	100 kg
World Championships
Silver medal – second place	1979 San Diego	100 kg
Bronze medal – third place	1971 Sofia	90 kg
Pan American Games
Gold medal – first place	1971 Cali	90 kg
Gold medal – first place	1975 Mexico City	100 kg
Gold medal – first place	1979 San Juan	100 kg

Russell Owen "Russ" Hellickson (born May 29, 1948) is an American former amateur freestyle wrestler and collegiate wrestling coach. Born in Madison, Wisconsin, Hellickson competed in the 1976 Summer Olympics for the United States, winning the silver medal in the Freestyle Heavyweight competition and served as the captain of the U.S. squad in 1980. He served as national charter president of Federation of Wrestling Clubs, vice president on the USWF National Board of Control, and as a member of the USWF Hall of Fame selection committee. He was also the head wrestling coach at Wisconsin (1982–1986) before finishing out his coaching career at The Ohio State University from 1986 to 2006.

== Wrestling career ==
=== High school ===
Hellickson was a three-sport high school star, winning three AAU wrestling titles and the 1966 WIAA State Meet at 180 pounds for Stoughton High School in Wisconsin.

=== College ===
Russ was a consistent winner at the University of Wisconsin, which would lead into national and international prominence after graduation in 1970.

=== National and International Competition ===
Russ won 12 national Freestyle championships and one Greco-Roman title. He won the Tbilisi International in 1974 and the World Cup, and was the first wrestler to win three gold medals in the Pan Am Games. Russ is a 1976 Olympic silver medalist and in the same year he earned USWF Grand Champion Wrestler Award based on points earned in tournaments during 1975–76. He also was the USWF Wrestler of the Year in 1976.

==== World Championships ====
Hellickson competed three times in the World Championships, winning a silver medal in 1979 and a bronze medal in 1971.

==== Pan American Games ====
Hellickson was the Gold medal winner at the Pan American Games in 1971 (198 pounds), 1975 (220), and 1979 (220)

==== Olympics ====
- Member of the U.S. Olympic freestyle wrestling team in 1976 and 1980.
- Won a silver medal at 220 pounds in the Olympic Games at Montreal in 1976.
- Captained the 1980 U.S. Olympic freestyle team, which boycotted the games.

===== Results =====
Games	Age	City	Sport	Event	Team	NOC	Rank	Medal
1976 Summer	28	Montreal	Wrestling	Men's Heavyweight, Freestyle	United States	USA	2	Silver

===== Men's Heavyweight, Freestyle =====
Games	Age	City	Sport	Team	NOC	Phase	Unit	Rank	Date	Result	BP	MR
1976 Summer	28	Montreal	Wrestling	United States	USA	Final Standings		2	1976-07-27			
1976 Summer	28	Montreal	Wrestling	United States	USA	Final Round	Match #1	1	1976-07-31	Hellickson (USA) decision (12–6), Kostov (BUL)		
1976 Summer	28	Montreal	Wrestling	United States	USA	Round Five		2	1976-07-31		3,5	
1976 Summer	28	Montreal	Wrestling	United States	USA	Round Five	Match #1	2	1976-07-31	Yarygin (URS) decision (19–13), Hellickson (USA)		3,0
1976 Summer	28	Montreal	Wrestling	United States	USA	Round Four		1	1976-07-30		0,5	
1976 Summer	28	Montreal	Wrestling	United States	USA	Round Four	Match #2	1	1976-07-30	Hellickson (USA) decision (14–5), Khorloogiin (MGL)		0,5
1976 Summer	28	Montreal	Wrestling	United States	USA	Round Three		1T	1976-07-29		0,0	
1976 Summer	28	Montreal	Wrestling	United States	USA	Round Three	Match #2	1	1976-07-29	Hellickson (USA) fall (8:26), Sokhtesaraie (IRI)		0,0
1976 Summer	28	Montreal	Wrestling	United States	USA	Round Two		1T	1976-07-28		0,0	
1976 Summer	28	Montreal	Wrestling	United States	USA	Round Two	Match #2	1	1976-07-28	Hellickson (USA) DQ (6:52), Shimizu (JPN)		0,0
1976 Summer	28	Montreal	Wrestling	United States	USA	Round One		1T	1976-07-27		0,0	
1976 Summer	28	Montreal	Wrestling	United States	USA	Round One	Match #2	1	1976-07-27	Hellickson (USA) fall (2:35), Peache (GBR)		0,0

== Coaching career ==
In 1971, Hellickson began his coaching career as an assistant coach with Wisconsin, becoming the head coach for Wisconsin in 1983. After four seasons as the head coach for Wisconsin, he took over as the head coach for Ohio State from 1986 to 2006. In 2002, Hellickson was named the 2002 National Wrestling Coaches Association (NWCA) National Coach of the Year. He was inducted into the Ohio State Athletics Hall of Fame on Sept. 26, 2014. Over the duration of his career he has mentored 67 All-Americans and 17 national title holders. five NCAA champions and two dozen All-Americans.

== Role in Ohio State University abuse scandal ==
Hellickson was the head wrestling coach at Ohio State University's (OSU) wrestling program from 1986 to 2006. OSU opened an investigation in April 2018 that looked into allegations of sexual misconduct by the former wrestling team's physician, Richard Strauss. Strauss, who died by suicide in California in 2005, was employed at Ohio State from September 1978 to March 1998 as an athletics doctor, faculty member and student health center physician.

Much of the reporting on the collective failure of multiple OSU coaches, assistant coaches, and administrators' failure to report the abuse and coverup has focused on Hellickson's mentee and assistant coach Jim Jordan, later elected to the U.S. House of Representatives. Jordan, who had a locker next to Strauss, has repeatedly denied any knowledge of any inappropriate conduct by Strauss. According to former OSU champion wrestler Dunyasha Yetts, Hellickson said, "I will defend Jimmy until I have to put my hand on a Bible and be asked to tell the truth, then Jimmy will be on his own."

In a video provided to NBC News by former Ohio State wrestler Mike DiSabato, the initial whistleblower, Hellickson states on camera that he confronted Strauss directly about his misbehavior, telling the doctor he was too "hands on" with the wrestlers and that his showering with the team made them uncomfortable. He also says inappropriate behavior in the wrestling room and showers extended beyond Strauss and that he complained about the behavior, which included people having sex in the wrestling room and watching athletes in the shower, to then-Ohio State intramural sports and recreation director Fred Beekman. "Certainly all my administrators recognized it was an issue for me," Hellickson says in the footage. "I’m sure that I talked to them on numerous occasions about my discontent with the environment. I know I had a lot of conversations with Fred Beekman about it. But nothing ever changed." Also on the video, Hellickson says that he complained to Ohio State administrators that strangers were coming to ogle the wrestlers in the showers at Larkins Hall, where the team worked out. "I caught people having sex in our wrestling room, in our stairwell to the wrestling room, in the bathroom adjacent to our wrestling facility," the coach says "It became a real problem…. There were times when some of the athletes themselves would confront people and say, 'Get out of here. You’re here all the time. You’re watching me. I don’t like it.'"

Yetts told Politico he had asked both Jordan and Hellickson to be present for a medical examination to avoid inappropriate touching by Strauss.

Hellickson allegedly contacted several former OSU wrestling team members and urged them to recant their statements and support Jim Jordan after the former wrestlers accused Jim Jordan of turning a blind eye to alleged sexual abuse, according to the wrestlers and text messages they shared with NBC News. The former wrestlers said their ex-coach made it clear to them he was under pressure from Jordan to get statements of support from members of the team. Yetts shared a July 4, 2018 text message he received from Hellickson with NBC News wherein Hellickson wrote "If you think the story got told wrong about Jim [Jordan], you could probably write a statement for release that tells your story and corrects what you feel bad about. I can put you in contact with someone who would release it. Do not talk to any media. People will call you to convince you I said to talk. No No No"

Mike DiSabato provided a text message to NBC News that states that Mark Coleman was pressured to issue a retraction statement after Jim Jordan, his brother, high school wrestling coach Jeff Jordan, and Hellickson each called Coleman's parents. NBC News corroborated DiSabato's account of the pressure placed on Coleman and his family by another former OSU wrestler, who has previously spoken to NBC News before and asked not to be identified.

Ohio State released a 232-page report by Perkins Coie, a Seattle-based law firm, hired by the university for $6.2 million to conduct a 12-month independent investigation into Strauss' misconduct and find out who at the university knew about it. The report details Strauss' acts of sexual abuse against at least 177 former students including 153 athletes: 48 wrestlers, 16 gymnasts, 15 swimmers/divers, 13 soccer players, 10 lacrosse players and more during his employment.with the university from 1978 to 1998. Investigators concluded that university personnel at the time had knowledge of complaints and concerns about Strauss' conduct as early as 1979 but failed to investigate or act meaningfully.

According to the report: 22 coaches, 18 student athletic trainers and five team physicians across multiple sports confirmed they were aware of rumors or complaints about Strauss' misconduct. At the Student Health Center, the director assigned "chaperones" to keep an eye on Strauss in the exam rooms. The report did not identify lower-level coaches and trainers by name. In the redacted version that has been released, Hellickson is referred to as "Head Coach A".

== Awards ==
- Charter member of the Wisconsin Wrestling Hall of Fame (inducted in 1976).
- Named National W Club Man of the Year in 1979.
- Recipient of the Amateur Wrestling News Man of the Year Award in 1981.
- Inducted into the National Wrestling Hall of Fame in 1989.
- Two-time Big Ten Coach of the Year (1991 and 2002)
- Midlands Open Hall of Fame Inductee in 1993.
- Hellickson was inducted into the University of Wisconsin Athletic Hall of Fame in 1995.
- Hellickson was named the 2002 National Wrestling Coaches Association (NWCA) National Coach of the Year.
- He was inducted into the Ohio State Athletics Hall of Fame on Sept. 26, 2014.

== Media ==
- Russ and his wife Nancy wrote "The Crossface", the Wisconsin Wrestling Newspaper winning them two national awards for wrestling writing.
- Wrestling announcer for ABC at the 1984 Olympics, for TBS at the '86 and '90 Goodwill Games, and for NBC at the 1988, '92 and '96 Olympics.

== Family ==
Hellickson and his wife Nancy have three children.
