= Battle of Köse Dağ =

1243 battle during the Mongol invasions of Anatolia

- Part of the Mongol invasions of Anatolia
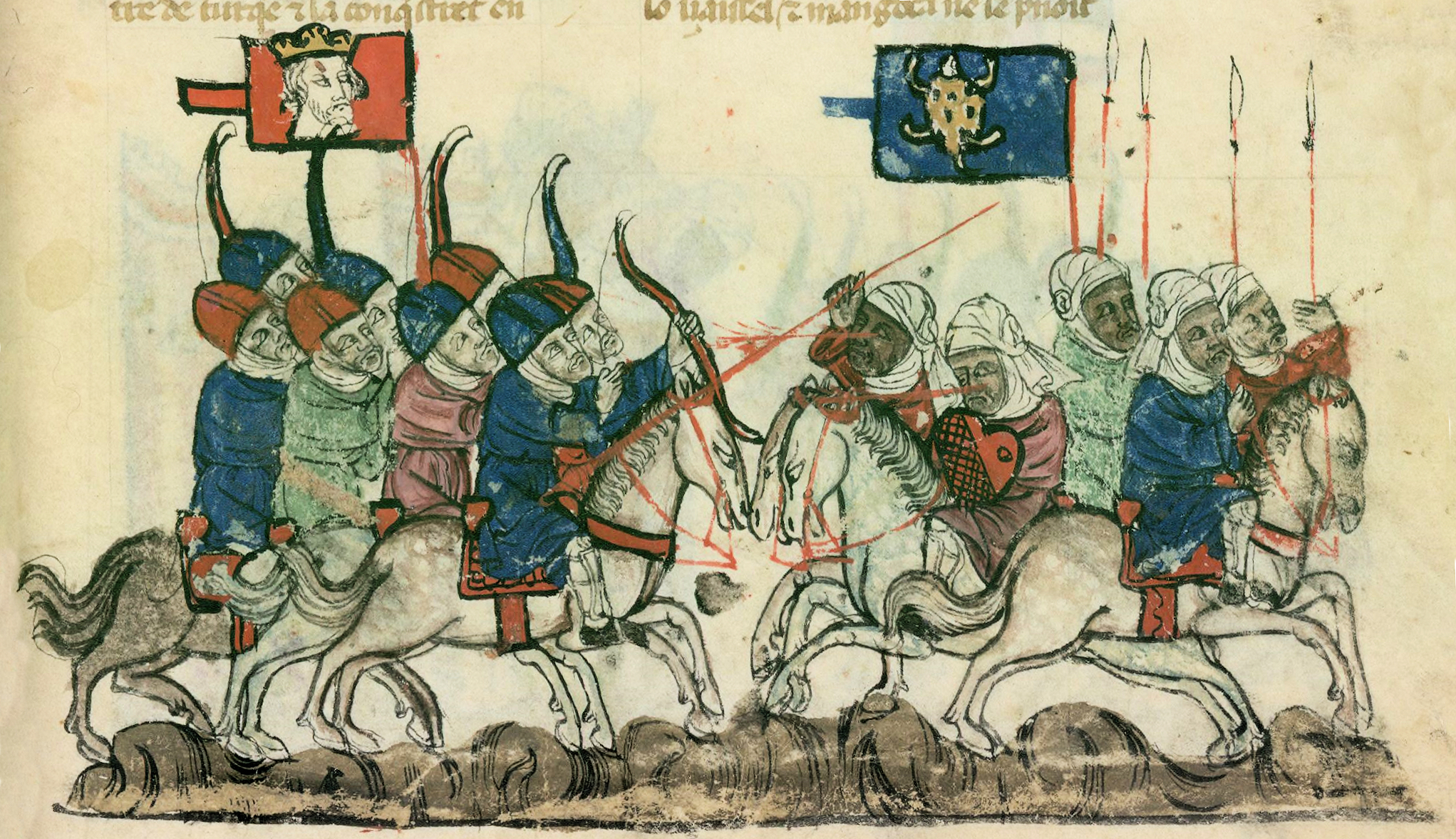
- The Mongols chasing the Seljuks of Rum. Hayton of Corycus, Fleur des histoires d'orient.
Date	26 June 1243
Location	Köse Dağ Mountain 40.2825°N 39.5950°E
Result	Mongol victory

Belligerents
Mongol Empire	Seljuk Sultanate of Rum

Commanders and leaders
Baiju Noyan	Kaykhusraw II

Strength
30,000 Mongols accompanied by Georgian and Armenian auxiliaries	Around 80,000

Points of interest during the Köse Dağ campaign

The Battle of Köse Dağ took place in eastern Anatolia on 26 June 1243 when an army of the Sultanate of Rum, led by Sultan Kaykhusraw II, confronted an invading Mongol army under the general Baiju and was decisively defeated. The battle was the pivotal event of the Mongol conquest of Anatolia: Rum, previously a significant independent power in the eastern Mediterranean, was reduced to the status of a client kingdom, and its territories were later absorbed into the Mongol Ilkhanate.

The Mongol Empire first achieved territorial contact with Rum in the early 1230s by conquering a large swathe of western Iran, but largely left it alone over the next decade. Instead, under their general Chormaqan, Mongol armies subjugated Transcaucasia and reduced the Kingdom of Georgia to a vassal state. Relations deteriorated after the accession of Kaykhusraw II to the Rum throne in 1237, and Mongol raids on Rum territory began in 1240. Two years later, Baiju, who had replaced Chormaqan after the latter became disabled, captured and pillaged the city of Erzurum, escalating hostilities into open war. He again invaded Rum in 1243, with an army of 30,000 Mongol troops accompanied by Georgian and Armenian auxiliaries.

Kaykhusraw built a large army to confront the invasion, but his 80,000-strong force lacked the discipline and cohesion of the Mongols. He ignored the cautious advice of experienced nobles under his command, and attacked his enemy on the pass of Köse Dağ Mountain on 26 June. For most of the day, the army of Rum appeared to be slightly superior, but it started to disintegrate late on. The apprehensive army of Rum fled during the night; Baiju missed the opportunity to capture the Sultan because he suspected the deserted enemy camp was a trap. Nevertheless, the Mongols captured several cities following their success at Köse Dağ, and exacted a vast annual tribute from their enemy. Rum never recovered from this critical defeat.

== Background ==
In 1071, the Seljuk Turks decisively defeated the Byzantine Empire at the Battle of Manzikert and quickly overran Anatolia. One Seljuk prince, Suleiman ibn Qutalmish, established an independent state in the region six years later. Known as the Sultanate of Rum, it conquered many groups, including the rebellious Turkoman nomads, and gained control of large parts of Anatolia over the next 150 years. By the 1230s, aided by the collapse of Byzantine power, Seljuk Rum had attained significant maritime and commercial capabilities through their control of the key ports of Antalya and Sinope.

The Mongol Empire was established in 1206 by Genghis Khan (r. 1206–1227). During his reign, the Mongols dismantled the Jin dynasty and the Western Xia state in northern China, the Qara Khitai in Turkestan, and the Khwarazmian Empire in Central Asia and Persia. Under Genghis's son and successor Ögedei Khan (r. 1229–1241), further military campaigns were launched against the remnants of the Jin, while another force invaded first the Russian principalities and then central Europe between 1236 and 1242.

A further army, commanded by the general Chormaqan, was dispatched in 1230 to eliminate the renegade Khwarazmian prince Jalal al-Din who had founded a state in western Iran. This mission was soon accomplished, with Jalal al-Din killed by a Kurd in August 1231. Chormaqan set up his headquarters on the fertile Mughan plain, and for the next decade consolidated Mongol rule over western Iran and Transcaucasia. With 30,000 men under his command, he marched every year against hostile fortresses in the Caucasus region, focusing especially on subduing the Kingdom of Georgia; by 1239 the Mongols had conquered much of its land and forced the remainder, ruled by Queen Rusudan, to become a vassal state. In c. 1240, Chormaqan was incapacitated by either deafness, a form of paralysis, or possibly both. He was replaced by Baiju, his second in command.

Kayqubad I, the sultan of Rum between 1220 and 1237, had correctly feared that Jalal al-Din's activities would draw the attention of the Mongols to the lands surrounding his realm. Although Rum was known for its excellent pastures, the Mongols did not initially attack it, aside from a raid in 1232 led by Baiju on the lands around Sivas. They instead accepted the Seljuk offerings of friendship and a small tribute; Kayqubad also accepted the Mongols' request that he personally travel to the Mongol ruler in Karakorum to pay homage, but died before he did so. Relations deteriorated during the reign of Kayqubad's successor Kaykhusraw II (r. 1237–1246). Even though he submitted at first, Kaykhusraw may have felt that the Mongols did not want to attack or that he could repel them. By 1240, relations had degraded so badly that the Mongols began to raid Seljuk territory; that year, Rum was likely weakened by the Babai revolt led by Baba Ishak, a local preacher. Nevertheless, Kaykhusraw acted aggressively, campaigning against the city of Amid, close to Mongol territory, in 1240–41.

== Prelude ==
In 1242, Baiju escalated hostilities into open war. His Mongol army, accompanied by Christian Caucasian auxiliaries, demanded the submission of the city of Erzurum, which had been under Seljuk rule since 1071; when the Mongol ambassadors were insultingly rejected, the city was besieged. After two months, the Mongols' siege engines breached the walls, whereupon the city was sacked—unusually for the Mongols, even churches were pillaged for their treasures, which Baiju's Christian troops distributed among their own settlements. Baiju then retreated to spend the winter on the Mughan plain, before marching into Rum again the following year.

Kaykhusraw attempted to build a strong army to repel the Mongol invasion by hiring large numbers of mercenaries from surrounding regions. These included knights from the Crusader Latin Empire, nobles from the Greek remnants of the Byzantine Empire, and warriors from the Ayyubids of Aleppo and the Arab tribes of Iraq, while Kaykhusraw commanded a contingent of Georgian knights because of his marriage to Tamar, a Georgian princess. Kaykhusraw also concluded a treaty with John III Vatatzes, (Note: Some historians, such as the medieval George Akropolites and the modern Franz Dölger, believe this treaty was concluded after the battle.) the ruler of the Empire of Nicaea (a Byzantine successor state), who likely hoped Rum would remain a buffer state between his realm and the Mongols.

Other powers in the area, such as Cilician Armenia, promised they would supply troops for Rum. They however had no desire to raise the ire of the Mongols, whom they regarded as a much more dangerous enemy, and so the Armenian armies delayed their arrival until the battle was over. Although the powerful remnants of the Khwarazmian army had been employed by Rum as mercenaries until 1237, they had resisted Kaykhusraw's accession and refused to fight for him, as did the Turkomans who had participated in the Babai revolt. Several capable Seljuk commanders had also been eliminated by Kaykhusraw's powerful advisor Sa'd al-Din Köpek who viewed them as potential rivals, and so their army's command structure had become undisciplined and disunited.

The core of the Mongol army comprised around 30,000 experienced and disciplined troops, who were mostly ethnic Mongols but also included Uighurs and men from Turkestan. They were accompanied by Georgian and Armenian cavalry, including the ruler of the Armenian Principality of Khachen. The army was commanded by Baiju and a number of competent officers. The Mongol core had ten years' experience fighting as a unit, and so possessed a cohesion the Turkish forces lacked. The Mongol force was certainly outnumbered by Kaykhusraw's army, whom contemporary chroniclers claimed to have contained 160,000 or 200,000 men; a more realistic estimate, according to the historian Bayarsaikhan Dashdondog, is 80,000.

== Battle ==
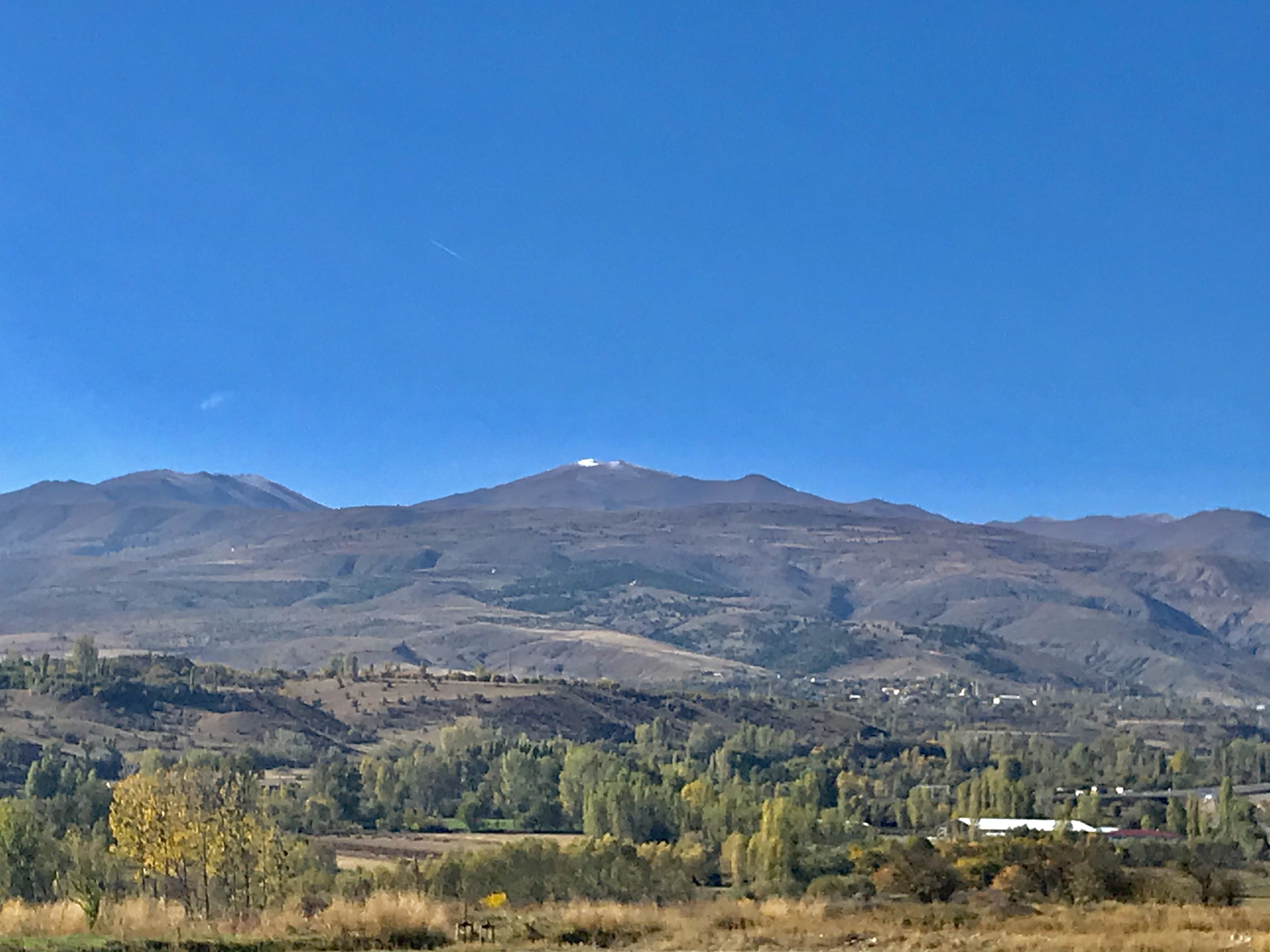
Köse Dağ Mountain in eastern Anatolia

The forces of Rum assembled at Sivas, and many experienced nobles advised Kaykhusraw to remain there to take advantage of the city's fortifications. He was nevertheless convinced by some younger nobles, who were tired of waiting, that he should go on the offensive. When the army arrived at the pass of Köse Dağ Mountain (the name means 'bald mountain'), around 80 kilometres (50 mi) northwest of Sivas, a similar disagreement ensued. The more prudent nobles again encouraged Kaykhusraw to take a defensive position on the favourable terrain and await reinforcements who were still arriving, but they were overruled by their younger counterparts, who accused them of cowardice. On 26 June, one young noble ordered his troops to mount and advance, provoking his fellows into following him.

This confusion, alongside the terrain at the pass, which led through a narrow and steep ravine, allowed Baiju to take advantage of his army's discipline and his own excellent generalship. To confront the leading Seljuk forces at the pass, he quickly assembled a vanguard composed of the best soldiers from every unit, and reorganised the remainder. The two vanguards clashed at the bottleneck in the ravine, whereupon the Georgian heavy cavalry contingents proved essential for both sides, and the soldiers of Rum slightly superior in quality overall.

The hard fighting lasted for close to a day, but the Seljuk formation suddenly crumbled in the evening. The causes of this collapse are not certain: the contemporary Armenian historian Grigor of Akanc attributed it to a decisive intervention by a Georgian prince named Aghbagha against the Seljuk right wing, but the 20th-century historian Josef Matuz, pointing out inconsistencies in Aghbagha's reported actions, dismissed this account as a literary topos. Matuz favoured the accounts of other sources, which describe the Mongols feigning a retreat before suddenly inflicting sustained arrow fire and charging again. The Seljuk dead included Wali al-Din, one of the pervānes (personal aides) of Kaykhusraw.

The apprehensive forces of Rum fled their camp during the night. Kaykhusraw was concerned that some of his more disloyal subjects might defect to Baiju, and thus withdrew to Ankara with his wife and children. The next day, Baiju suspected that the deserted enemy camp was a trap and held his men back from plundering it for a further day; this delay in advancing cost them the chance of capturing Kaykhusraw.

== Aftermath ==
After the battle, the Mongols captured a number of cities in Anatolia, including Kayseri, Sivas, Erzincan, and Ankara, while Kaykhusraw was fleeing to Antalya. Rum was only spared total annihilation by the negotiations of the vizier Muhezzibeddin, who agreed terms of surrender including a vast tribute: annual payments of 12 million silver coins, 500 bolts of silk, 500 camels, and 5,000 sheep (equivalent to around 400,000 gold dinars) were to be transported to Mongolia at Rum's expense. Later envoys confirmed the appointment of a Mongol daruyachi (lit. 'overseer') to supervise the region, along with the official submission of the Seljuk rulers to the Mongol throne.

The victory at Köse Dağ established Mongol dominance in Anatolia at the expense of Rum, whose authority was weakened, over the Turkomans especially. The Mongols soon gained the submission of the Empire of Trebizond, whose ruler Manuel I likely attended the coronation of Güyük in Mongolia in 1246. John III Vatatzes was forced to abandon a planned campaign against the Latin Empire to strengthen Nicaea's eastern defences against a possible Mongol or Turkoman invasion. Cilician Armenia voluntarily submitted to the Mongols in 1244, receiving lands and fortresses as a reward for their initiative, and while the Principality of Antioch initially refused to follow, it reversed course under Armenian influence and eventually swore allegiance.

Upon Kaykhusraw II's death in 1246, his realm was rent apart by factions representing his three underage sons. Although some sultans of Rum, especially Kaykaus II (r. 1246–1261), proved troublesome for the Mongols, Seljuk power steadily decreased, finally dying out in 1308. Its territories were assumed by the Ilkhanate, one of the successor states of the Mongol Empire.
