= Alfons Hecher =

German wrestler

Alfons Hecher (born 16 October 1943) is a German former wrestler who competed in the 1972 Summer Olympics.
