= Suşehri =

- Municipality
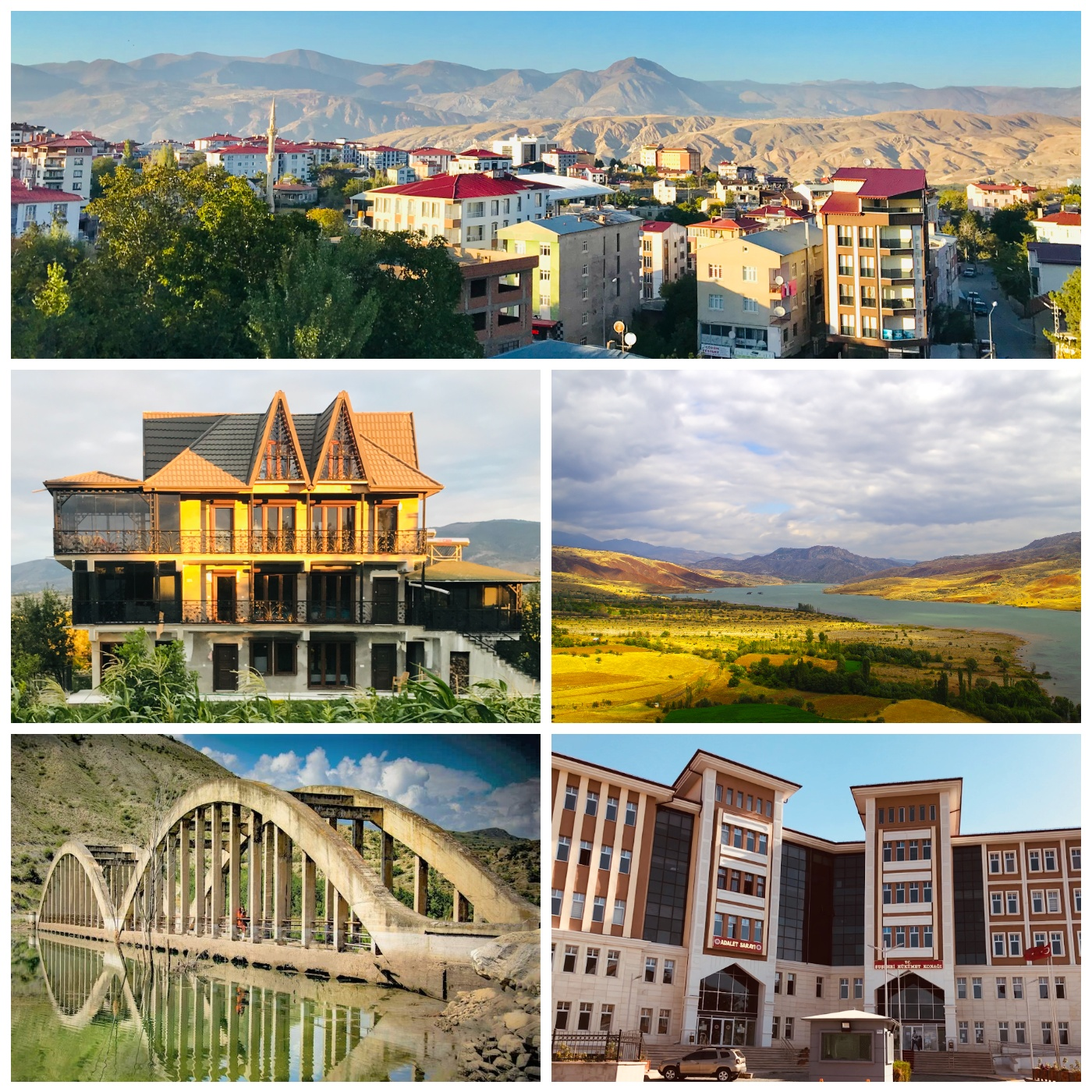
- From top to bottom: Skyline of Suşehri • Village of Solak • Kılıçkaya Dam • Akçaağıl Bridge • Suşehri Governorship building

- Logo

- Location within Turkey Location within Turkey Central Anatolia
- Coordinates: 40°09′57″N 38°05′39″E
- Country: Turkey
- Province: Sivas
- District: Suşehri

Government
  - Mayor: Ahmet Ayhan Kayaoğlu (MHP)
- Elevation: 1,017 m (3,337 ft)
- Population (2022): 15,960
- Time zone: UTC+3 (TRT)
- Postal code: 58600
- Area code: 0346
- Website: www.susehri.bel.tr

Suşehri (formerly: Endires) is a town in Sivas Province of Turkey. It is the seat of Suşehri District. Its population is 15,960 (2022). The mayor is Ahmet Ayhan Kayaoğlu (MHP), since 2024.

== Name ==
The original site of Suşehri was 2 km east of the current city centre. After the country called Bulahiye had collapsed by earthquakes, it started to flourish in its current location with the name of Andıryas. In Kurdish it is known as Bilekan.

With the arrangement of counties made in 1857, Şebinkarahisar was detached from Trabzon, then Amasya, Tokat and Şebinkarahisar were given to Sivas. With this arrangement Gölova (Suşar) and Akşar were superseded. Then the Village of Endıres itself comprised a county and was called Suşehri.

In 1933 Şebinkarahisar became a town with a new law, and it was given Giresun while Suşehri was given Sivas. Suşehri is part of the Caucasian region in terms of culture and geography.

== History ==
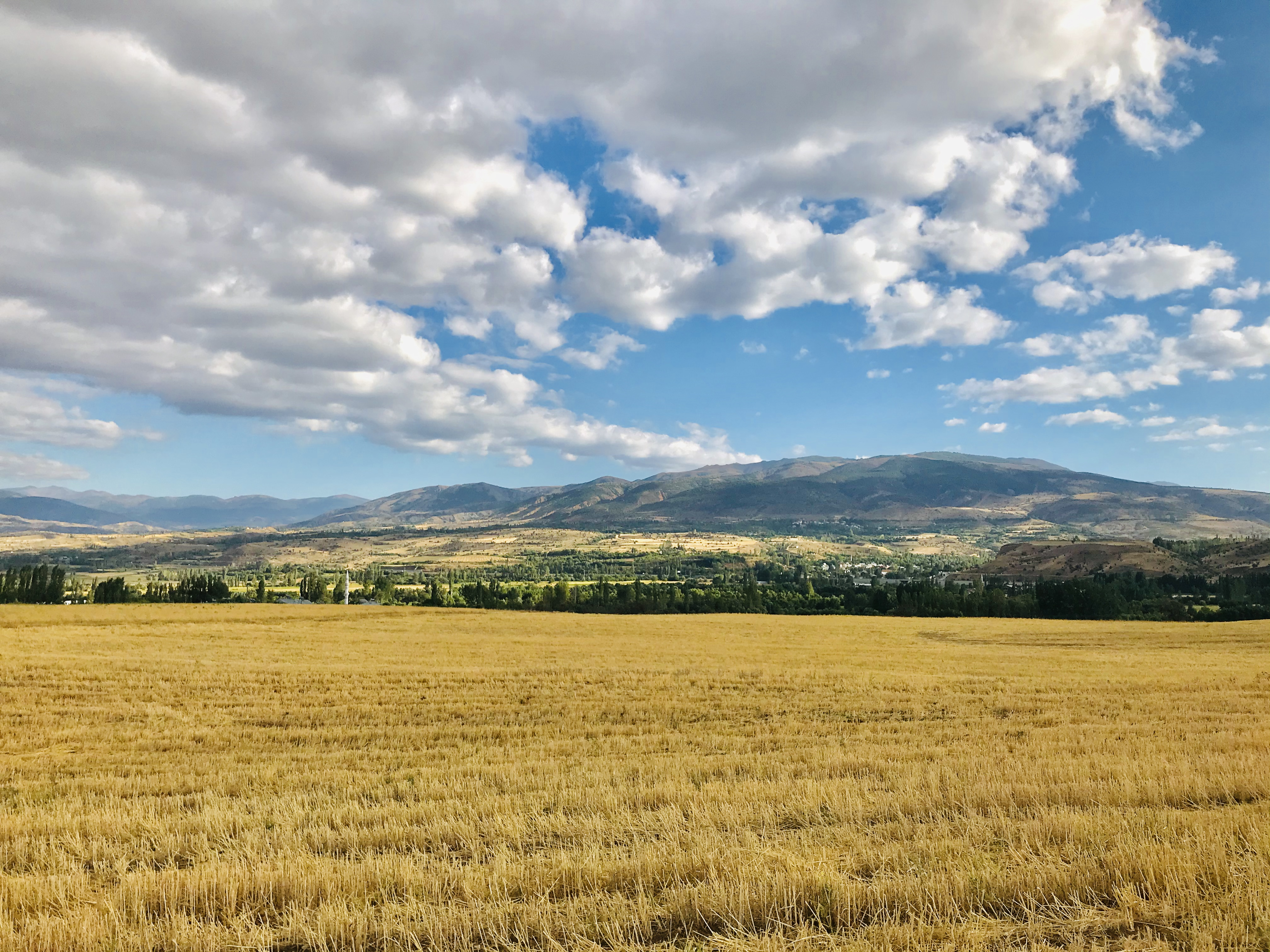
A view from farmland in Suşehri, 2020

Suşehri is an ancient localization centre. According to accounts its history begins from Bronze Age. In the nearby plain objects were found which prove that the area was inhabited during the Bronze Age. This area called Kayadelen Village which is under the barrage of Kılıçkaya now. There are some castle hangover from term of Byzantine Empire, Rome Era and Selçuklu Era in villages of Akşar, Eskişar and Kale and also in Çataloluk.

The villages of Büyükgüzel and Küçükgüzel which are ancient localization areas are the important centres in Roman Era. That registered from. The marble head of lion which was found in Küçükgüzel is exhibited at Museum of Sivas. Also there are some objects from the same area which are protected in The Garden of Administration Hall.

Akşar (Akşar-Abat), town of Suşehri, was an important centre in Middle Age. Also Suşehri and around of it was depended to Akşar and so we understand that Plain of Suşehri is called ‘Plain of Akşar’ in historical sources.

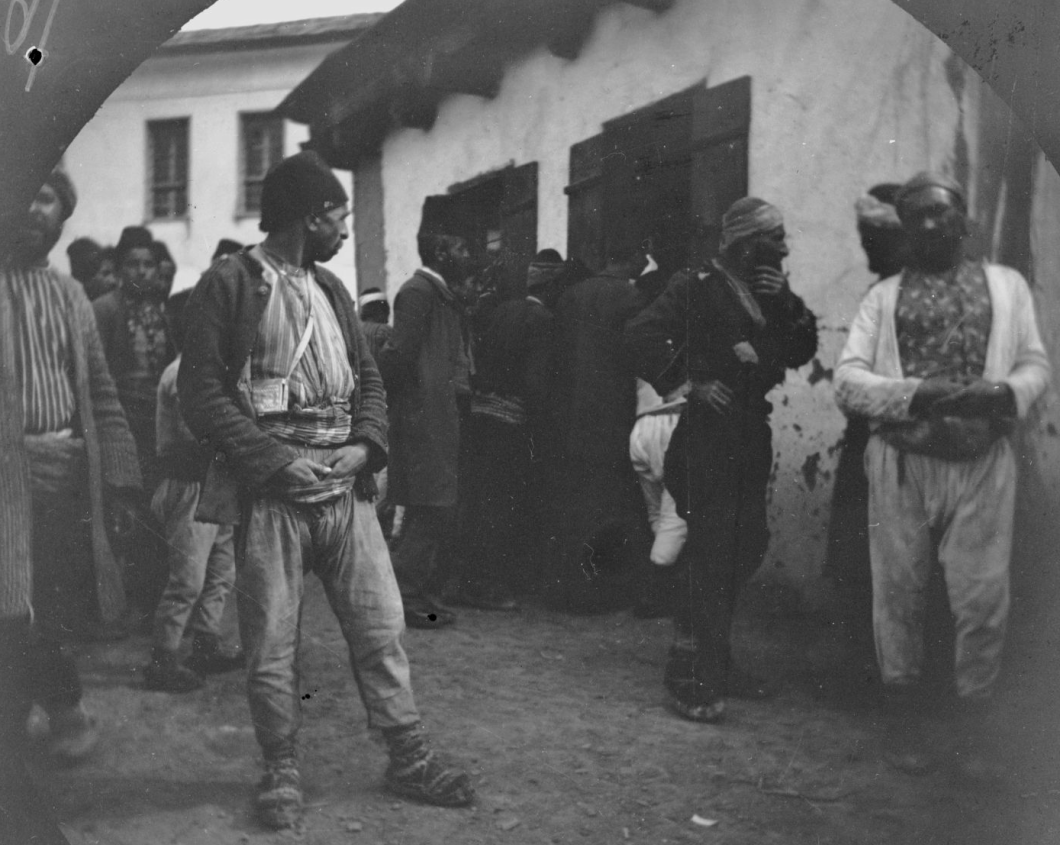
A group of men in Enderes, 1891

The town was severely damaged by a magnitude 6.3 earthquake on 18 May 1929. At least 64 people were killed across multiple villages including in the town.

== Geology and geomorphology ==
Suşehri district center is located on the northern slopes of Kösedağ.

== Culture ==
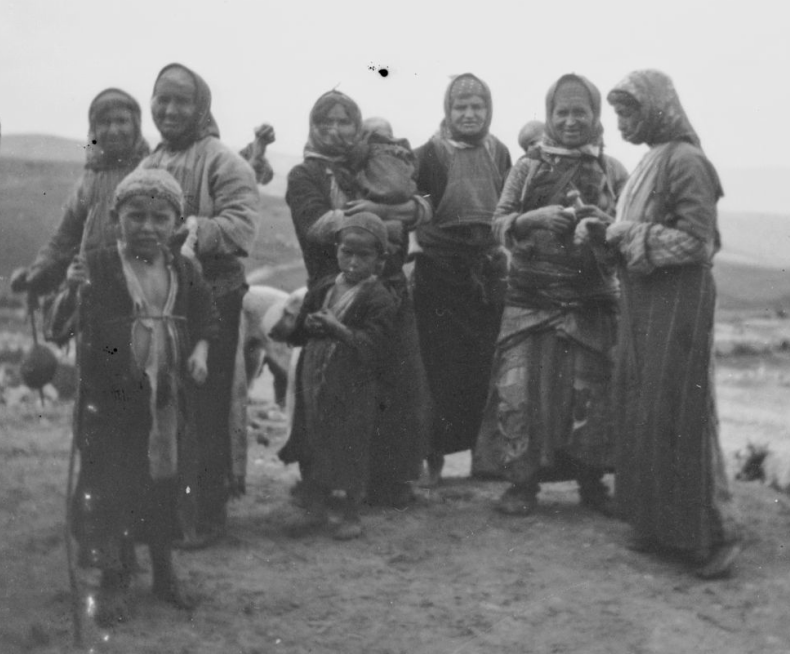
Women and children near Enderes (Suşehri), 1891

One of the most important facts affecting the cultural structure is its geographical position. Because of being on the border of Anatolia and Black Sea, it shows both species of folk and plant properties.
