= Khorloogiin Bayanmönkh =

Mongolian wrestler (born 1944)

Personal information
- Native name: Хорлоогийн Баянмөнх
- Nationality: Mongolia
- Born: 22 February 1944 (age 82) Khyargas, Uvs, Mongolia
- Height: 183 cm (6 ft 0 in)
- Weight: 100 kg (220 lb)

Sport
- Country: Mongolia
- Sport: Wrestling
- Event: Freestyle
Medal record
Representing Mongolia
Men's freestyle wrestling
Olympic Games
Silver medal – second place	1972 Munich	Heavyweight
World Championships
Gold medal – first place	1975 Minsk	100 kg
Silver medal – second place	1971 Sofia	100 kg
Silver medal – second place	1974 Istanbul	100 kg
Asian Games
Gold medal – first place	1974 Tehran	100 kg
Men's sambo
World Championships
Gold medal – first place	1974 Ulaanbaatar	100 kg
Silver medal – second place	1975 Minsk	100 kg
Men's Greco-Roman wrestling
Asian Games
Silver medal – second place	1974 Tehran	100kg

Khorloogiin Bayanmönkh (Mongolian: Хорлоогийн Баянмөнх; born 22 February 1944) is a retired Mongolian wrestler. At the 1972 Summer Olympics he received a silver medal in the men's freestyle heavyweight category. His name Bayanmonkh means "Rich eternal" in the Mongolian language.

== Career ==
In 1971, Bayanmönkh won his first world medal. Нe became the 1971 World Championships silver medallist at 100 kg event without the single defeat, Bayanmönkh wrestled to the draws against eventual World Championships bronze medalist Vasil Todorov of Bulgaria and eventual World champion Shota Lomidze of Soviet Union in the semifinal and final, respectively.

In 1972 he was awarded the title of Merited Master of Sport of the USSR.

He was originally named after the revolutionary D.Sükhbaatar, as he was born on the same date, February 2. However, following a severe illness at the age of six, he was given the new name Bayanmönkh.

Bayanmönkh is the second most successful wrestler in Mongolian wrestling with 10 championship wins (1968, 1971–1973, 1975, 1977, 1979, 1981–1982, 1987).

He officially retired from Mongolian wrestling in 2022 during Naadam festival at the age of 78. Prior to the start of the 5th round, a zasuul sang poetic praise of his triumphs and achievements in his Mongolian wrestling career one last time.

== Personal life ==
Bayanmönkh's son Bayanmönkhiin Gantogtokh was a professional wrestler as well, and granddaughter Khandsuren Gantogtokh is a professional volleyball player.

== Mongolian wrestling career record ==
Khorloogiin Bayanmönkh
Year	Level	Participants	Rank	Wins	Earned title	Notes
2001	State	512	State Grand Champion	4		
2000	State	512	State Grand Champion	4		
1999	State	512	State Grand Champion	4		
1998	State	512	State Grand Champion	4		
1997	State	512	State Grand Champion	4		
1996	State	512	State Grand Champion	4		
1995	State	512	State Grand Champion	4		
1994	State	768	State Grand Champion	4		
1993	State	512	State Grand Champion	4		
1992	State	512	State Grand Champion	6		
1991	State	512	State Grand Champion	7	Bukhnee Bishrelt	
1989	State	512	State Grand Champion	7	Buurshgui Khuchit	
1988	State	512	State Grand Champion	7	Olniig Bayasuulagch	
1987	State	512	State Grand Champion	9	Tunch Garamgai	
1985	State	512	State Grand Champion	7	Manlain Bayasgalant	
1984	State	512	State Grand Champion	6	Unud Bayasgalant	
1983	State	512	State Grand Champion	7	Bat Nyagt Itgelt	
1982	State	512	State Grand Champion	9	Tod Sonin Uzesgelent	
1981	State	512	State Grand Champion	9	Bayar Naadmiin Manlai	
1980	State	512	State Grand Champion	8	Bukhnee Duursgalt	
1979	State	512	State Grand Champion	9	Manlain Bayasgalant	
1978	State	512	State Grand Champion	7	Uls Dayar Gaikhamshigt	
1977	State	512	State Grand Champion	9	Ulemj Badrakh	
1975	State	512	State Grand Champion	9	Tumnees Tuguldur	
1974	State	512	State Grand Champion	8	Tumnees Tuguldur	
1973	State	512	State Grand Champion	9	Bayar Naadmiin Manlai	
1972	State	512	State Grand Champion	9	Dalai Dayan	
1971	State	512	State Champion	9	State Grand Champion	
1969	State	512	State Champion	7		
1968	State	512	State Lion	9	State Champion	
1967	State	512	State Lion	8		
1966	State	512	State Elephant	7	State Lion	
1965	State	512	State Elephant	8	Khurts Garamgai	
1964	State	512	State Elephant	6	Ulam Nemekh	
1963	State	512	Unranked	5	State Falcon	
State Naadam Winner Won at least 5 rounds in State Naadam Aimag/Sum Naadam Promotion
