= Petr Drozda =

Czech wrestler

Personal information
- Nationality: Czech
- Born: 29 March 1952 (age 74) Kraslice, Czechoslovakia

Sport
- Sport: Wrestling

Petr Drozda (born 29 March 1952) is a Czech wrestler. He competed in the men's freestyle 100 kg at the 1976 Summer Olympics.
