= Steve Daniar =

Canadian wrestler (born 1955)

Personal information
- Full name: Stephen Daniar
- Born: 18 July 1955 (age 71) Fort William, Ontario, Canada
- Height: 184 cm (6 ft 0 in)

Sport
- Sport: Wrestling
Medal record
Men's Greco-Roman wrestling
Representing Canada
Pan American Games
Bronze medal – third place	1979 San Juan	90 kg

Stephen "Steve" Daniar (born 18 July 1955) is a Canadian former wrestler. He competed in the men's freestyle 100 kg at the 1976 Summer Olympics.
