= József Csatári =

Hungarian wrestler (1943–2021)

Medal record

Men's freestyle wrestling

Representing Hungary

Olympic Games
Bronze medal – third place	1968 Mexico City	Light Heavyweight
Bronze medal – third place	1972 Munich	Heavyweight

József Csatári (17 December 1943 – 30 January 2021) was a Hungarian wrestler. He was born in Budapest. He was Olympic bronze medalist in Freestyle wrestling in 1968 and in 1972. He won a silver medal at the 1970 World Wrestling Championships. He died on 30 January 2021.
