= Dimo Kostov =

Bulgarian wrestler (born 1947)

Medal record

Men's freestyle wrestling

Representing Bulgaria

Olympic Games
Bronze medal – third place	1976 Montreal	heavyweight

Dimo Kostov (Bulgarian: Димо Костов; born 17 March 1947) is a Bulgarian former wrestler who competed in the 1976 Summer Olympics.
