= Suşehri District =

District of Sivas Province, Turkey

- District
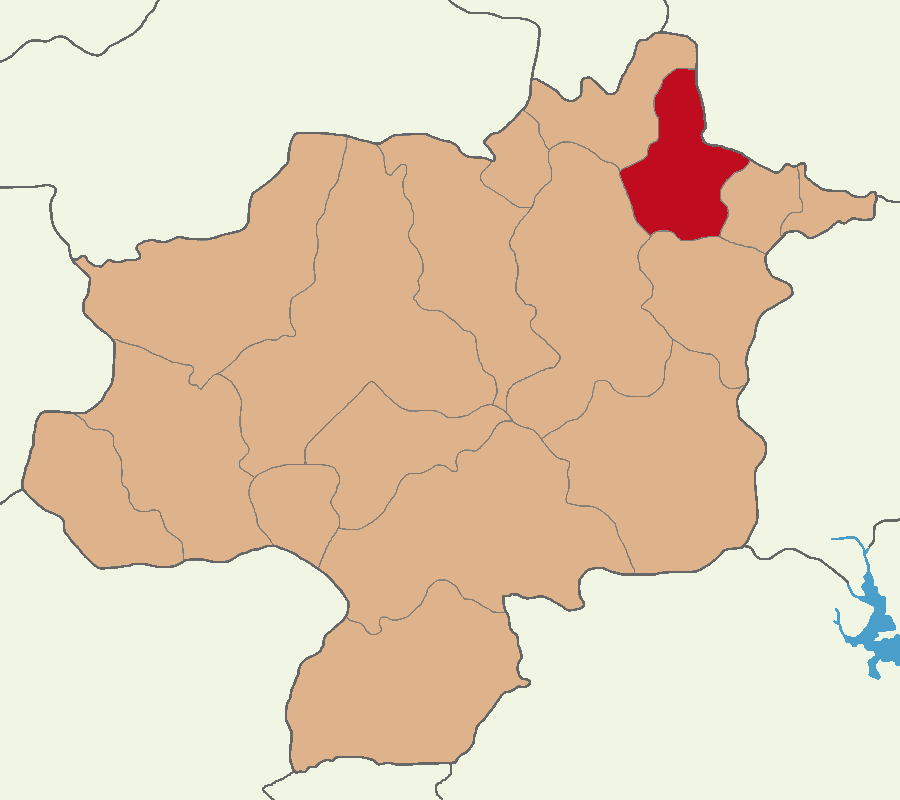
- Map showing Suşehri District in Sivas Province

- Location in Turkey Suşehri District (Turkey Central Anatolia)
- Coordinates: 40°10′N 38°06′E
- Country: Turkey
- Province: Sivas
- Seat: Suşehri

Government
  - Kaymakam: Ahmet Korkmaz
- Area: 939 km^{2} (363 sq mi)
- Population (2022): 25,499
  - Density: 27/km^{2} (70/sq mi)
- Time zone: UTC+3 (TRT)
- Website: www.susehri.gov.tr

Suşehri District is a district of the Sivas Province of Turkey. Its seat is the town of Suşehri. Its area is 939 km^{2}, and its population is 25,499 (2022).

== Composition ==
There is one municipality in Suşehri District:

- Suşehri

There are 71 villages in Suşehri District:

- Akçaağıl
- Akıncı
- Aksu
- Akşar
- Arpacı
- Arpayazı
- Aşağıakören
- Aşağısarıca
- Balkara
- Beydeğirmeni
- Bostancık
- Boyalıca
- Büyükgüzel
- Çakırlı
- Camili
- Çamlıdere
- Çataloluk
- Cevizli
- Çitlice
- Çokrak
- Elmaseki
- Erence
- Esenyaka
- Eskimeşe
- Eskişar
- Eskitoprak
- Gelengeç
- Gökçekaş
- Gökçekent
- Gözköy
- Güdeli
- Gümüştaş
- Güneyli
- Güngören
- Günlüce
- Hödücek
- Kaleköy
- Karaağaç
- Karaağaç
- Karacaören
- Karalar
- Kavşıt
- Kayadelen
- Kekeç
- Kemalli
- Kesikkaş
- Kızıltaş
- Kiziryurdu
- Kozçukur
- Küçükgüzel
- Kurugöl
- Kuzdere
- Olucak
- Polat
- Sağpazar
- Saraycık
- Şarköy
- Sökün
- Solak
- Taklak
- Taşbayır
- Tatarköy
- Türkmenler
- Üzümlü
- Yamaç
- Yaygınsöğüt
- Yelkesen
- Yeşilyayla
- Yoncalı
- Yukarıakören
- Yürekli
