= Julio Tamussin =

Italian wrestler

- Born: 29 April 1943
- Died: 29 December 2015 (aged 72)
- Occupation: Wrestler
- Known for: Competing in the Olympics

Julio Tamussin (29 April 1943 – 29 December 2015) was an Italian wrestler who competed in the 1972 Summer Olympics. He was a freestyle heavyweight, and ended up in eighth place.
