= Shizuo Yada =

Japanese wrestler (born 1948)

Shizuo Yada (矢田 静雄, Yada Shizuo; born 18 January 1948) is a Japanese former wrestler which competed in the 1972 Summer Olympics.
