= Harald Büttner =

German wrestler (born 1953)

Personal information
- Nationality: German
- Born: 13 April 1953 (age 73) Meissen, Bezirk Dresden, East Germany

Sport
- Sport: Freestyle wrestling
Medal record
Representing East Germany
World Championships
Gold medal – first place	1978 Mexico City	100 kg
Silver medal – second place	1975 Minsk	100 kg
Silver medal – second place	1977 Lausanne	100 kg
Bronze medal – third place	1974 Istanbul	100 kg

Harald Büttner (born 13 April 1953) is a German former wrestler. He competed at the 1976 Summer Olympics and the 1980 Summer Olympics. Büttner was a seven-time national champion in East Germany, and also won multiple medals at the European and World Championships.
