= Ryszard Długosz =

Polish wrestler

Ryszard Długosz (born 10 November 1941 in Nowotaniec) is a Polish former wrestler who competed in the 1968 Summer Olympics and in the 1972 Summer Olympics.
