= Shota Lomidze =

Georgian wrestler (1936–1993)

Medal record

Men's freestyle wrestling

Representing the Soviet Union

Olympic Games
| Silver medal – second place | 1968 Mexico City | light-heavyweight |

World Championships
| Gold medal – first place | 1969 Mar del Plata | 100 kg |
| Gold medal – first place | 1971 Sofia | 100 kg |
| Silver medal – second place | 1967 New Delhi | 97 kg |

Shota Lomidze (20 January 1936 – 23 October 1993) was a Georgian wrestler who competed in the 1964 Summer Olympics and in the 1968 Summer Olympics.
