= Bruno Jutzeler =

Swiss wrestler

Bruno Jutzeler (born 1 January 1946) is a Swiss former wrestler who competed in the 1972 Summer Olympics.
