= Karel Engel =

Czech wrestler (1940–2018)

Karel Engel (28 May 1940 – 30 December 2018) was a Czech wrestler who competed in the 1972 Summer Olympics.
