= Daniel Verník =

Argentine wrestler (born 1948)

Daniel Vernik
Personal information
- Born: 28 March 1948 (age 77) Buenos Aires, Argentina

Sport
- Sport: Wrestling

Victor Daniel Vernik (born 28 March 1948) is an Argentinian former wrestler. He competed at the 1968 Summer Olympics and the 1976 Summer Olympics.

At the 1965 Maccabiah Games in Israel, Vernik won a silver medal in the middleweight wrestling competition. He also took silver at the Premios Olimpia in Argentina, in 1976.
