= Gerd Bachmann =

German wrestler

Gerd Bachmann (born 14 August 1943 in Gera) is a German former wrestler who competed in the 1968 Summer Olympics and in the 1972 Summer Olympics.
