= Enache Panait =

Romanian wrestler

Enache Panait (born 6 October 1949) is a Romanian former wrestler who competed in the 1972 Summer Olympics and in the 1976 Summer Olympics.
