= Vasil Todorov =

Bulgarian wrestler

Vasil Todorov (Bulgarian: Васил Тодоров; 20 October 1944 – September 2022) was a Bulgarian wrestler who competed in the 1972 Summer Olympics, where he finished fourth in the 100 kg category. He was the bronze medalist at the 1969 and 1971 World Wrestling Championships, and fifth in 1970. He won four medals (3 silver, 1 bronze) at the European Wrestling Championships in the years 1968-1972.
