= Sivas Province =

Province of Turkey

Coordinates: 39°31′11″N 37°17′42″E

Sivas Province Sivas ili
- Province
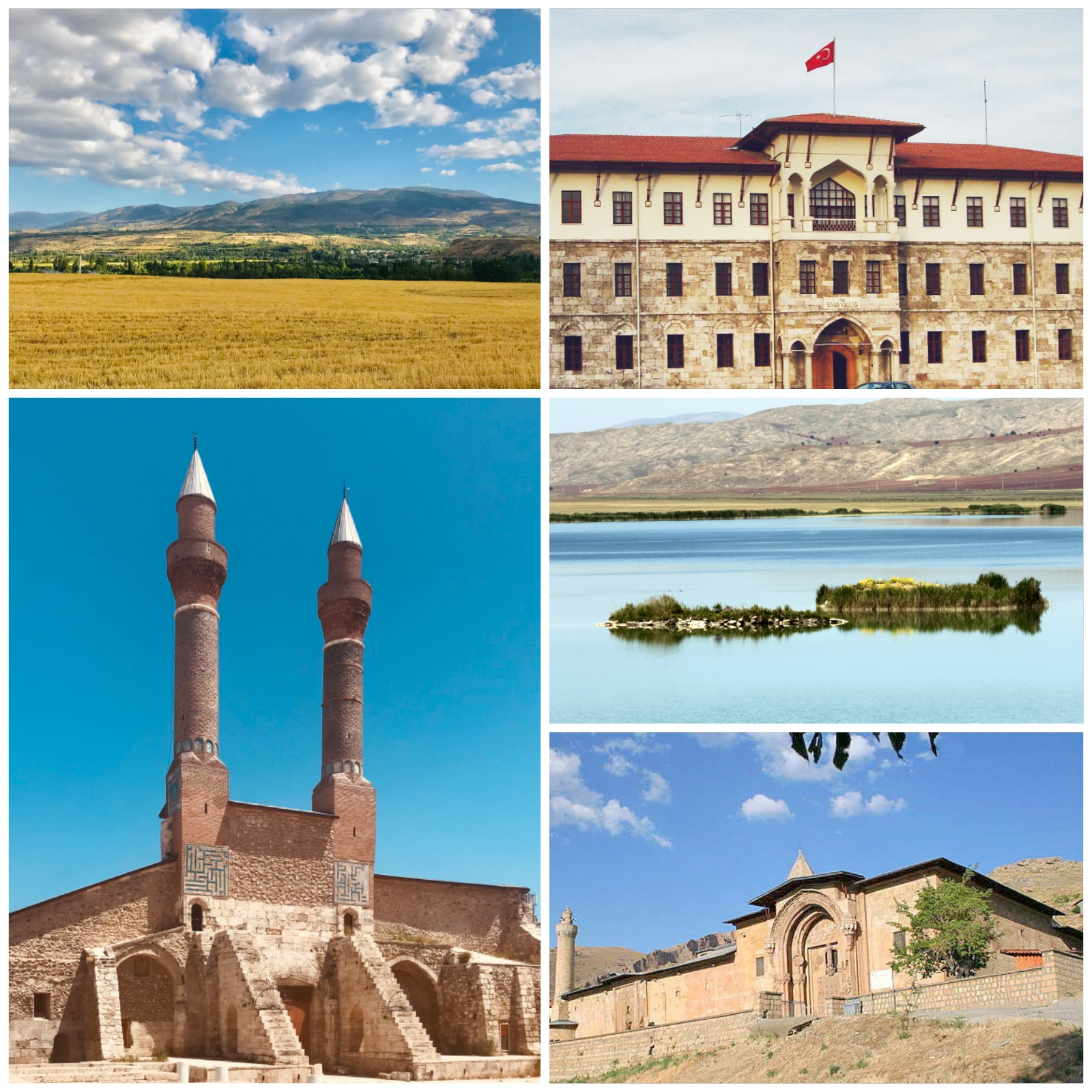
- From top: District of Suşehri, Sivas Governorship Building, Double Minaret Madrasah, Lake Tödürge, Divriği Great Mosque and Hospital

- Location of the province within Turkey
- Country: Turkey
- Seat: Sivas

Government
  - Governor: Dr. Yılmaz Şimşek
- Area: 28,164 km^{2} (10,874 sq mi)
- Population (2022): 634,924
  - Density: 22.544/km^{2} (58.388/sq mi)
- Time zone: UTC+3 (TRT)
- Area code: 0346
- Website: www.sivas.gov.tr

Sivas Province (Turkish: Sivas ili) is a province of Turkey. It is located in the eastern part of the Central Anatolia region of Turkey. Its area is 28,164 km^{2} (the second largest province after Konya), and its population is 634,924 (2022). Its adjacent provinces are Yozgat to the west, Kayseri to the southwest, Kahramanmaraş to the south, Malatya to the southeast, Erzincan to the east, Giresun to the northeast, and Ordu to the north. Its capital is Sivas.

Most of Sivas Province has the typical continental climate of the Central Anatolian Region, in which summer months are hot and dry, while winter months are cold and snowy. However, the northern part of the province shows some features of the oceanic/humid subtropical Black Sea climate, while the eastern portion has influences of the Eastern Anatolian highland climate. This province is noted for its thermal springs.

== Districts ==
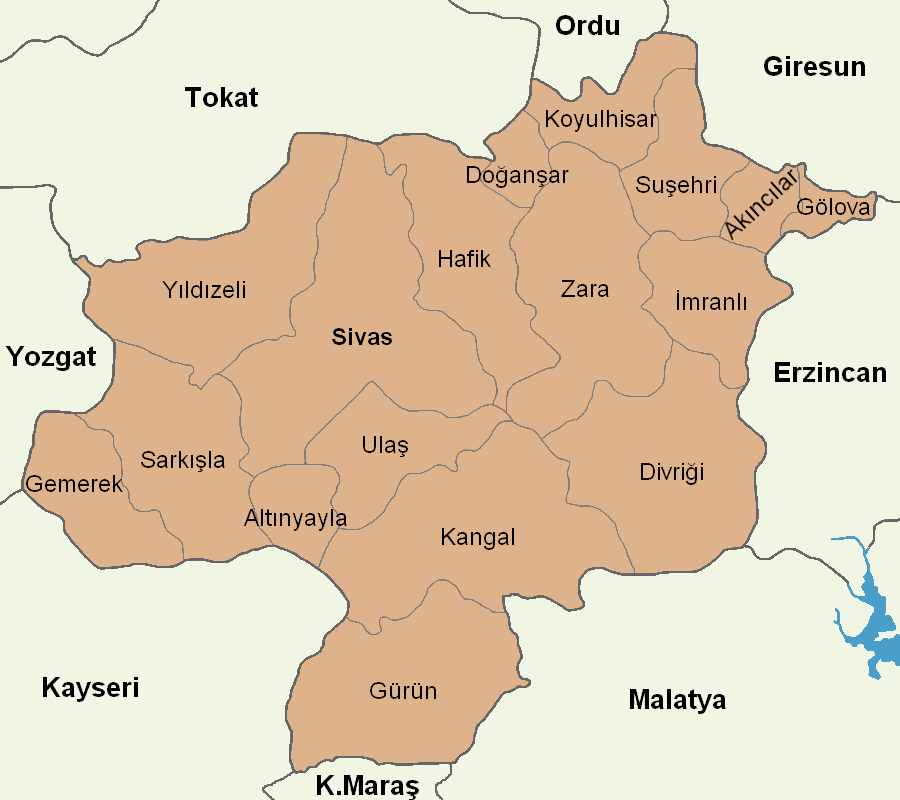

Sivas province is divided into 17 districts (capital district in bold):

- Akıncılar
- Altınyayla
- Divriği
- Doğanşar
- Gemerek
- Gölova
- Gürün
- Hafik
- İmranlı
- Kangal
- Koyulhisar
- Şarkışla
- **Sivas**
- Suşehri
- Ulaş
- Yıldızeli
- Zara

== History ==
The route of the Silk Road and the Persian Royal Road run through Sivas.

According to the written historical sources, the region of Sivas province was first inhabited during the period of the Hittite civilization by the beginning of 2000 BC and became an important settlement. The region then encountered the reign of Armenian, Roman, Byzantine, Seljukian, and Ottoman civilizations.

The foundations of the modern Turkish Republic were laid in the Sivas Congress assembled on 4 September 1919, during the presidency of Mustafa Kemal Atatürk, thus making the province of Sivas important to the history of the Turkish nation.

== Geology and geomorphology ==
=== Mountains ===
The main mountains of the Köse Mountains are located in the mountain range; Mount Asmalı (2.406), Mount Tekeli (2.621 m), Mount Köse (3,050 m) and Kızıldağ (3.015 m). Tecer Mountains, Akdağlar, İncebel Mountains, Mount Yama.

== Attractions ==
- Şifaiye Medrese
- Surp Asdvadzadzin Church of Tuzhisar, also known as the Armenian St. Virgin Mary Church
- Surp Kevork Church in Tavra
- Alakilise in Zara
- Surp Anapat
- Holy Forty Martyrs Church
- Surb Nshan Monastery
- Sızır Waterfall
- Lake Gökpınar

== Economy ==
Historically, the province produced alum, copper, silver, iron, coal, asbestos, arsenic, and salt.

== Gallery ==
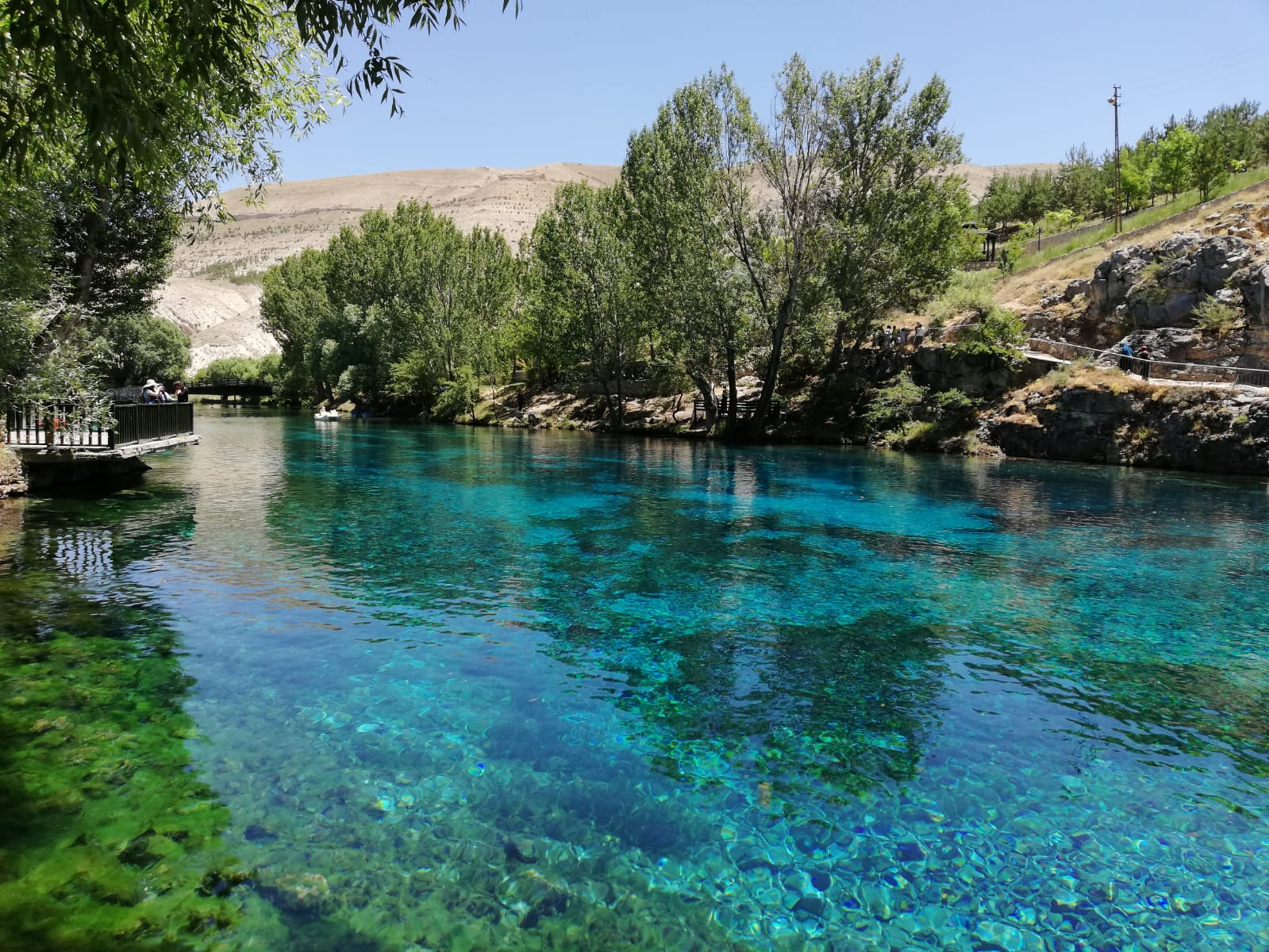
Lake Gökpınar
