= Iran at the 1968 Summer Olympics =

- IOC code: IRI (IRN used at these Games)
- NOC: National Olympic Committee of Iran

in Mexico City, Mexico
- Competitors: 14 in 3 sports
- Flag bearer: Abolfazl Anvari
- Medals Ranked 19th: Gold 2 Silver 1 Bronze 2 Total 5

Summer Olympics appearances (overview)
- 1900; 1904–1936; 1948; 1952; 1956; 1960; 1964; 1968; 1972; 1976; 1980–1984; 1988; 1992; 1996; 2000; 2004; 2008; 2012; 2016; 2020; 2024; 2028

Iran competed at the 1968 Summer Olympics in Mexico City, Mexico. 14 athletes represented Iran in the 1968 Olympics. Wrestler Mohammad Nassiri and Weightlifter Abdollah Movahed won the nation first Olympic Games gold medal in 12 years since Melbourne 1956.

== Competitors ==
Sport	Men	Women	Total
Athletics	1		1
Weightlifting	4		4
Wrestling	9		9
Total	14	0	14

== Medal summary ==
=== Medal table ===
Sport	Gold	Silver	Bronze	Total
Weightlifting	1	1		2
Wrestling	1		2	3
Total	2	1	2	5

=== Medalists ===
Medal	Name	Sport	Event
Gold	Mohammad Nassiri	Weightlifting	Men's 56 kg
Gold	Abdollah Movahed	Wrestling	Men's freestyle 70 kg
Silver	Parviz Jalayer	Weightlifting	Men's 67.5 kg
Bronze	Aboutaleb Talebi	Wrestling	Men's freestyle 57 kg
Bronze	Shamseddin Seyed-Abbasi	Wrestling	Men's freestyle 63 kg

== Results by event ==
=== Athletics ===
Men

Athlete	Event	Qualification		Final	
Athlete	Event	Result	Rank	Result	Rank
Jalal Keshmiri	Shot put	Did not start		Did not advance	
Jalal Keshmiri	Discus throw	53.96	20	Did not advance	

=== Weightlifting ===
Men

Athlete	Event	Press	Snatch	Clean & Jerk	Total	Rank
Mohammad Nassiri	56 kg	112.5	105.0	150.0 WR	367.5	1st place, gold medalist(s)
Nasrollah Dehnavi	60 kg	117.5	107.5	140.0	365.0	6
Parviz Jalayer	67.5 kg	125.0	132.5	165.0	422.5	2nd place, silver medalist(s)
Daniel Gevargiz	75 kg	No mark	—	—	—	—

=== Wrestling ===
Men's freestyle

Athlete	Event	1st round	2nd round	3rd round	4th round	5th round	6th round	7th / Final round	Rank
Mohammad Ghorbani	52 kg	Defran (DOM); W Fall	Solari (ECU); W Fall	Triantafyllidis (GRE); W Fall	Sanders (USA); L Fall	Nakata (JPN); L Fall		Did not advance	7
Aboutaleb Talebi	57 kg	Raxon (GUA); W Superiority	Ahmad (AFG); W Points	Sardar (PAK); W Points	Bye	Behm (USA); W Points	Aliev (URS); D Points	Uetake (JPN); D Points	3rd place, bronze medalist(s)
Shamseddin Seyed-Abbasi	63 kg	Douglas (USA); W Points	Luczak (GDR); W Superiority	Engel (TCH); W Fall	Tedeev (URS); W Points	Karypidis (GRE); W Fall		Todorov (BUL); D Points	3rd place, bronze medalist(s)
Shamseddin Seyed-Abbasi	63 kg	Douglas (USA); W Points	Luczak (GDR); W Superiority	Engel (TCH); W Fall	Tedeev (URS); W Points	Karypidis (GRE); W Fall		Kaneko (JPN); L Points	3rd place, bronze medalist(s)
Abdollah Movahed	70 kg	Garvie (CAN); W Superiority	Vario (ARG); W Superiority	Marchand (FRA); W Superiority	Rost (FRG); W Superiority	Chand (IND); W Points	Sereeter (MGL); W Points	Valchev (BUL); W Points	1st place, gold medalist(s)
Ali Mohammad Momeni	78 kg	Ayub (AFG); W Superiority	Bajkó (HUN); W Points	Atalay (TUR); L Points	Heinze (GDR); W Points	Sotirov (BUL); W Points		Did not advance	4
Mansour Mehdizadeh	87 kg	Balla (ROU); L Disqualification	Did not appear	Did not advance					22
Moslem Eskandar-Filabi	97 kg	Vernik (ARG); W Superiority	Jutzeler (SUI); L Points	Lomidze (URS); L Points	Did not advance			Did not advance	9
Abolfazl Anvari	+97 kg	Nyers (HUN); W Points	Robertsson (SWE); W Points	Kristoff (USA); L Points	Duraliev (BUL); L Fall	Did not advance		Did not advance	6

Men's Greco-Roman

Athlete	Event	1st round	2nd round	3rd round	4th round	5th round	6th round	Final round	Rank
Hossein Moarreb	63 kg	Hassanein (EGY); W DNF	Alakoç (TUR); L Points	Galinchev (BUL); L Fall	Did not advance				11
