= Wrestling at the 1972 Summer Olympics – Men's freestyle 68 kg =

Men's freestyle 68 kg at the Games of the XX Olympiad
- Venue: Messe München
- Dates: 27–31 August 1972
- Competitors: 25 from 25 nations

Medalists
1st place, gold medalist(s)		Dan Gable	United States
2nd place, silver medalist(s)		Kikuo Wada	Japan
3rd place, bronze medalist(s)		Ruslan Ashuraliyev	Soviet Union

The Men's Freestyle 68 kg at the 1972 Summer Olympics as part of the wrestling program at the Fairgrounds, Judo and Wrestling Hall. Israeli wrestler Eliezer Halfin was later killed in the Munich massacre.

== Medalists ==
Gold	Dan Gable; United States
Silver	Kikuo Wada; Japan
Bronze	Ruslan Ashuraliyev; Soviet Union

== Tournament results ==
The competition used a form of negative points tournament, with negative points given for any result short of a fall. Accumulation of 6 negative points eliminated the wrestler. When only two or three wrestlers remain, a special final round is used to determine the order of the medals.

Legend

- DNA — Did not appear
- TPP — Total penalty points
- MPP — Match penalty points

Penalties

- 0 — Won by Fall, Passivity, Injury and Forfeit
- 0.5 — Won by Technical Superiority
- 1 — Won by Points
- 2 — Draw
- 2.5 — Draw, Passivity
- 3 — Lost by Points
- 3.5 — Lost by Technical Superiority
- 4 — Lost by Fall, Passivity, Injury and Forfeit

=== Round 1 ===
TPP	MPP		Time		MPP	TPP
1	1	Ali Şahin (TUR)		Eliezer Halfin (ISR)	3	3
3	3	Jagrup Singh (IND)		Tsedendambyn Natsagdorj (MGL)	1	1
3	3	Ismail Yuseinov (BUL)		Ruslan Ashuraliyev (URS)	1	1
3.5	3.5	Segundo Olmedo (PAN)		Abdollah Movahed (IRI)	0.5	0.5
1	1	Eduardo Quintero (CUB)		Gabriel Ruz (MEX)	3	3
3	3	Josef Engel (TCH)		Petre Poalelungi (ROU)	1	1
0	0	Udo Schröder (GDR)	1:08	Arona Mané (SEN)	4	4
0	0	Stefanos Ioannidis (GRE)	2:47	Georges Carbasse (FRA)	4	4
4	4	Safer Sali (YUG)	7:35	Dan Gable (USA)	0	0
4	4	Ronald Ouellet (CAN)	8:58	Klaus Rost (FRG)	0	0
3.5	3.5	André Chardonnens (SUI)		Włodzimierz Cieślak (POL)	0.5	0.5
4	4	Joseph Gilligan (GBR)	7:36	Kikuo Wada (JPN)	0	0
0		József Rusznyák (HUN)		Bye		

=== Round 2 ===
TPP	MPP		Time		MPP	TPP
3	3	József Rusznyák (HUN)		Ali Şahin (TUR)	1	2
4	1	Eliezer Halfin (ISR)		Jagrup Singh (IND)	3	6
4	3	Tsedendambyn Natsagdorj (MGL)		Ismail Yuseinov (BUL)	1	4
1.5	0.5	Ruslan Ashuraliyev (URS)		Segundo Olmedo (PAN)	3.5	7
5	4	Eduardo Quintero (CUB)	5:45	Josef Engel (TCH)	0	3
7	4	Gabriel Ruz (MEX)	5:31	Petre Poalelungi (ROU)	0	1
3	3	Udo Schröder (GDR)		Stefanos Ioannidis (GRE)	1	1
8	4	Arona Mané (SEN)	1:50	Georges Carbasse (FRA)	0	4
7	3	Safer Sali (YUG)		Ronald Ouellet (CAN)	1	5
0.5	0.5	Dan Gable (USA)		Klaus Rost (FRG)	3.5	3.5
6.5	3	André Chardonnens (SUI)		Joseph Gilligan (GBR)	1	5
3.5	3	Włodzimierz Cieślak (POL)		Kikuo Wada (JPN)	1	1
0.5		Abdollah Movahed (IRI)		DNA		

=== Round 3 ===
TPP	MPP		Time		MPP	TPP
3	0	József Rusznyák (HUN)	4:50	Eliezer Halfin (ISR)	4	8
5	3	Ali Şahin (TUR)		Tsedendambyn Natsagdorj (MGL)	1	5
4	0	Ismail Yuseinov (BUL)	3:27	Eduardo Quintero (CUB)	4	9
1.5	0	Ruslan Ashuraliyev (URS)	7:37	Josef Engel (TCH)	4	7
3	2	Petre Poalelungi (ROU)		Udo Schröder (GDR)	2	5
5	4	Stefanos Ioannidis (GRE)	4:03	Dan Gable (USA)	0	0.5
4	0	Georges Carbasse (FRA)	4:53	Ronald Ouellet (CAN)	4	9
7	3.5	Klaus Rost (FRG)		Kikuo Wada (JPN)	0.5	1.5
3.5	0	Włodzimierz Cieślak (POL)	7:29	Joseph Gilligan (GBR)	4	9

=== Round 4 ===
TPP	MPP		Time		MPP	TPP
7	4	József Rusznyák (HUN)	4:42	Tsedendambyn Natsagdorj (MGL)	0	5
5	0	Ali Şahin (TUR)	8:26	Ismail Yuseinov (BUL)	4	8
1.5	0	Ruslan Ashuraliyev (URS)	2:23	Petre Poalelungi (ROU)	4	7
5	0	Udo Schröder (GDR)	2:17	Georges Carbasse (FRA)	4	8
8	3	Stefanos Ioannidis (GRE)		Włodzimierz Cieślak (POL)	1	4.5
1.5	1	Dan Gable (USA)		Kikuo Wada (JPN)	3	4.5

=== Round 5 ===
TPP	MPP		Time		MPP	TPP
6	1	Ali Şahin (TUR)		Ruslan Ashuraliyev (URS)	3	4.5
6	1	Tsedendambyn Natsagdorj (MGL)		Udo Schröder (GDR)	3	8
1.5	0	Dan Gable (USA)	4:13	Włodzimierz Cieślak (POL)	4	8.5
4.5		Kikuo Wada (JPN)		Bye		

=== Final ===
Results from the preliminary round are carried forward into the final (shown in yellow).

TPP	MPP		Time		MPP	TPP
	1	Dan Gable (USA)		Kikuo Wada (JPN)	3	
4	1	Kikuo Wada (JPN)		Ruslan Ashuraliyev (URS)	3	
2	1	Dan Gable (USA)		Ruslan Ashuraliyev (URS)	3	6

== Final standings ==
1. Dan Gable (USA)
2. Kikuo Wada (JPN)
3. Ruslan Ashuraliyev (URS)
4. Ali Şahin (TUR) and Tsedendambyn Natsagdorj (MGL)
5. -
6. Udo Schröder (GDR)
7. Włodzimierz Cieślak (POL)
