= Guatemala at the 1968 Summer Olympics =

- IOC code: GUA
- NOC: Guatemalan Olympic Committee

in Mexico City
- Competitors: 48 (47 men, 1 woman) in 8 sports
- Flag bearer: Teodoro Palacios
- Medals: Gold 0 Silver 0 Bronze 0 Total 0

Summer Olympics appearances (overview)
- 1952; 1956–1964; 1968; 1972; 1976; 1980; 1984; 1988; 1992; 1996; 2000; 2004; 2008; 2012; 2016; 2020; 2024

Guatemala competed at the 1968 Summer Olympics in Mexico City, Mexico. It had been 16 years since 1952, the previous time that the nation competed at the Olympic Games. 48 competitors, 47 men and 1 woman, took part in 37 events in 8 sports.

== Athletics ==
Men
Track & road events

| Athlete | Event | Heat | | Quarterfinal | | Semifinal | | Final | |
| Athlete | Event | Result | Rank | Result | Rank | Result | Rank | Result | Rank |
|---|---|---|---|---|---|---|---|---|---|
| Carlos Cuque | Marathon | —N/a | | | | | | 2:45:20 | 39 |
| Fulgencio Hernández | Marathon | —N/a | | | | | | 3:00:40 | 52 |
| Julio Ortíz | 20 km walk | —N/a | | | | | | 1:54:48 | 28 |
| Julio Quevedo | 1500 m | 4:03.13 | 9 | Did not advance | | | | | |
| Julio Quevedo | 5000 m | 15:23.0 | 9 | —N/a | | | | Did not advance | |
| Julio Quevedo | 3000 m steeplechase | 9:48.37 | 12 | —N/a | | | | Did not advance | |

Field events

| Athlete | Event | Qualification | | Final | |
| Athlete | Event | Distance | Position | Distance | Position |
|---|---|---|---|---|---|
| Teodoro Palacios | High jump | | | Did not advance | |

== Boxing ==
Men

| Athlete | Event | 1 Round | 2 Round | 3 Round | Quarterfinals | Semifinals | Final |
| Athlete | Event | Opposition Result | Opposition Result | Opposition Result | Opposition Result | Opposition Result | Rank |
|---|---|---|---|---|---|---|---|
| Mario Mendoza | Bantamweight | Chang Kyou-chul (KOR); L 0-5 | Did not advance | | | | |
| Eugenio Boches | Light Middleweight | —N/a | Mario Benítez (URU); L' 0-5 | Did not advance | | | |

== Cycling ==
Four cyclists represented Guatemala in 1968.

=== Road ===
| Athlete | Event | Time | Rank |
|---|---|---|---|
| Francisco Cuque | Men's road race | DNF | |
| Jorge Inés | Men's road race | 4:57:07 | 49 |
| Evaristo Oliva | Men's road race | 4:57:07 | 48 |
| Saturnino Rustrián | Men's road race | 4:46:13 | 22 |
| Evaristo Oliva; Francisco Cuque; Jorge Inés; Saturnino Rustrián | Team time trial | 2:24:20.7 | 21 |

== Football ==
=== Group D ===
| Team | Pld | W | D | L | GF | GA | GD | Pts |
|---|---|---|---|---|---|---|---|---|
| Bulgaria | 3 | 2 | 1 | 0 | 11 | 3 | +8 | 5 |
| Guatemala | 3 | 2 | 0 | 1 | 6 | 3 | +3 | 4 |
| Czechoslovakia | 3 | 1 | 1 | 1 | 10 | 3 | +7 | 3 |
| Thailand | 3 | 0 | 0 | 3 | 1 | 19 | −18 | 0 |

1968-10-14
12:00

| Guatemala | 1 – 0 | Czechoslovakia |
|---|---|---|
| Stokes 28' | Report |

Estadio Jalisco, Guadalajara
Referee: Romualdo Arppi Filho (Brazil)

1968-10-16
12:00

| Guatemala | 4 – 1 | Thailand |
|---|---|---|
| N. Melgar 23' 85'; Roldán 55'; López Oliva 67' | Report | Udomsilp Sornbutnark 44' |

Estadio Nou Camp, León
Referee: Jean-Louis Faber (Guinea)

1968-10-18
12:00

| Bulgaria | 2 – 1 | Guatemala |
|---|---|---|
| Nikodimov 50'; Zhekov 84' | Report | López Oliva 88' |

Estadio Nou Camp, León
Referee: Raúl Osorio (Mexico)

=== Quarter-finals ===
1968-10-20
12:00

| Hungary | 1 – 0 | Guatemala |
|---|---|---|
| Szűcs 69' | Report |

Estadio Jalisco, Guadalajara
Referee: Arturo Yamasaki (Peru)

== Shooting ==
Nine shooters, all men, represented Guatemala in 1968.

Open

| Athlete | Event | Final | |
| Athlete | Event | Score | Rank |
|---|---|---|---|
| Otto Brolo | Men's 50 metre rifle three positions | 1092 | 53 |
| Otto Brolo | Men's 50 metre rifle prone | 580 | 78 |
| Gerardo Castañeda | 50 m pistol | 537 | 39 |
| Víctor Castellanos | 25 m rapid fire pistol | 578 | 33 |
| Leonel Fernández | Men's 50 metre rifle three positions | 1068 | 56 |
| José Marroquín | Men's 300 metre rifle three positions | 1027 | 29 |
| Félipe Ortíz | Men's 300 metre rifle three positions | 1023 | 30 |
| Fernando Samoya | 25 m rapid fire pistol | 579 | 29 |
| Francisco Sandoval | 50 m pistol | 519 | 59 |
| Pablo Sittler | Men's 50 metre rifle prone | 579 | 79 |

== Swimming ==
Men

| Athlete | Event | Heat | | Semifinal | | Final | |
| Athlete | Event | Time | Rank | Time | Rank | Time | Rank |
|---|---|---|---|---|---|---|---|
| Ramiro Benavides | 200 metre freestyle | 2:11.7 | 47 | Did not advance | | | |
| Ramiro Benavides | 100 metre butterfly | 1:03.1 | 39 | Did not advance | | | |
| Ramiro Benavides | 200 metre butterfly | 2:24.3 | 38 | Did not advance | | | |
| Antonio Cruz | 100 metre backstroke | 1:11.8 | 35 | Did not advance | | | |
| Antonio Cruz | 200 metre backstroke | 2:36.3 | 38 | Did not advance | | | |
| Antonio Cruz | 400 metre medley | 5:31.1 | 33 | Did not advance | | | |

Women

| Athlete | Event | Heat | | Semifinal | | Final | |
| Athlete | Event | Time | Rank | Time | Rank | Time | Rank |
|---|---|---|---|---|---|---|---|
| Silvana Asturias | 100 metre freestyle | 1:10.3 | 56 | Did not advance | | | |
| Silvana Asturias | 200 metre freestyle | 2:30.7 | 36 | Did not advance | | | |
| Silvana Asturias | 400 metre freestyle | 5:25.6 | 27 | Did not advance | | | |
| Silvana Asturias | 800 metre freestyle | 11:12.5 | 25 | Did not advance | | | |

== Weightlifting ==
Men

| Athlete | Event | Military Press | | Snatch | | Clean & jerk | | Total | Rank |
| Athlete | Event | Result | Rank | Result | Rank | Result | Rank | Total | Rank |
|---|---|---|---|---|---|---|---|---|---|
| Francisco Echevarría | 60 kg | 87.5 | 21 | 77.5 | 21 | 112.5 | 20 | 277.5 | 20 |

== Wrestling ==
Men's freestyle

| Athlete | Event | Elimination Pool | | | | | | Final round | |
| Athlete | Event | Round 1 Result | Round 2 Result | Round 3 Result | Round 4 Result | Round 5 Result | Round 6 Result | Final round Result | Rank |
|---|---|---|---|---|---|---|---|---|---|
| Gustavo Ramírez | −52 kg | Wanelge Castillo (PAN); L T 8:15 | Sudesh Kumar (IND); L T 5:32 | Did not advance | | | | | 23 |
| Javier Raxon | −57 kg | Aboutaleb Talebi (IRN); L | Donald Behm (USA); L T 6:20 | Did not advance | | | | | 20 |
| José García | −63 kg | Ismail Al-Karaghouli (IRQ); L 5:45 | Nikolaos Karypidis (GRE); L T 4:47 | Did not advance | | | | | 20 |
| Ángel Aldana | −70 kg | Udey Chand (IND); L T 1:55 | Roger Till (GBR); L T 2:15 | Did not advance | | | | | 24 |
| José Manuel Hernández | −87 kg | Hüseyin Gursoy (TUR); L T 1:45 | Peter Doring (GDR); L T 0:37 | Did not advance | | | | | 20 |

Men's Greco-Roman

| Athlete | Event | Elimination Pool | | | | | | Final round | |
| Athlete | Event | Round 1 Result | Round 2 Result | Round 3 Result | Round 4 Result | Round 5 Result | Round 6 Result | Final round Result | Rank |
|---|---|---|---|---|---|---|---|---|---|
| Gustavo Ramírez | −52 kg | Enrique Jiménez (MEX); L T 1:25 | Shin Sang-Sik (KOR); L T 0:56 | Did not advance | | | | | 22 |
| Javier Raxon | −57 kg | Risto Björlin (FIN); L T 4:38 | Othon Moschidis (GRE); L T 1:23 | Did not advance | | | | | 24 |
| José García | −63 kg | Jiří Švec (TCH); L T 1:21 | Hideo Fujimoto (JPN); L T 0:20 | Did not advance | | | | | 19 |
| Ángel Aldana | −70 kg | Hun-Gyo Seo (KOR); L T 0:45 | Gordon Garvie (CAN); L T 6:17 | Did not advance | | | | | 24 |
| José Manuel Hernández | −87 kg | Petăr Krumov Petrov (BUL); L T 0:51 | Håkon Overby (NOR); L T 4:56 | Did not advance | | | | | 16 |
