= Wrestling at the 1968 Summer Olympics – Men's Greco-Roman 63 kg =

Men's Greco-Roman 63 kg at the Games of the XIX Olympiad
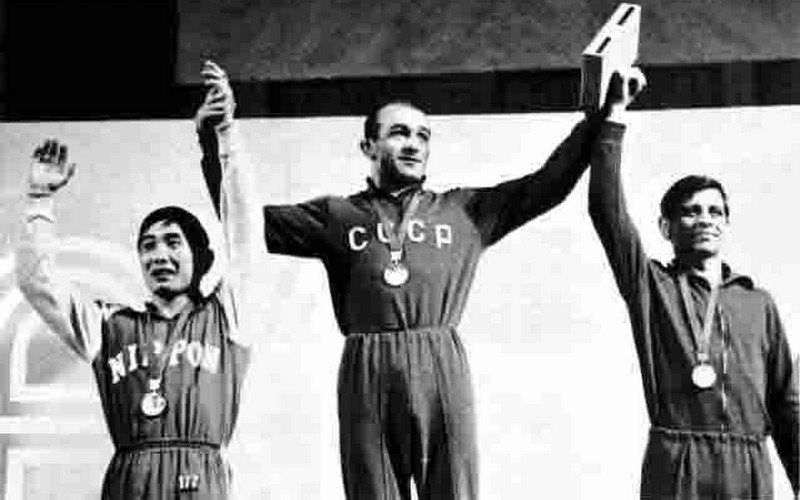
- Venue: Insurgentes Ice Rink
- Dates: 23–26 October 1968
- Competitors: 23 from 23 nations

Medalists
1st place, gold medalist(s)		Roman Rurua	Soviet Union
2nd place, silver medalist(s)		Hideo Fujimoto	Japan
3rd place, bronze medalist(s)		Simion Popescu	Romania

The Men's Greco-Roman Featherweight at the 1968 Summer Olympics as part of the wrestling program were held at the Insurgentes Ice Rink. The featherweight was the third-lightest weight class, allowing wrestlers up to 63 kilograms.

== Medalists ==
Gold	Roman Rurua; Soviet Union
Silver	Hideo Fujimoto; Japan
Bronze	Simion Popescu; Romania

== Tournament results ==
The competition used a form of negative points tournament, with negative points given for any result short of a fall. Accumulation of 6 negative points eliminated the wrestler. When only two or three wrestlers remain, a special final round is used to determine the order of the medals.

Legend

- TF — Won by Fall
- DQ — Won by Passivity or forfeit
- D2 — Both wrestlers lost by Passivity
- DNA — Did not appear
- TPP — Total penalty points
- MPP — Match penalty points

Penalties

- 0 — Won by Fall and Disqualification
- 0.5 — Won by Technical Superiority
- 1 — Won by Points
- 2 — Draw
- 2.5 — Draw, Passivity
- 3 — Lost by Points
- 3.5 — Lost by Technical Superiority
- 4 — Lost by Fall and Disqualification

=== 1st round ===
TPP	MPP		Score		MPP	TPP
0	0	Jiří Švec (TCH)	TF / 1:21	José Luis García (GUA)	4	4
1	1	Nikolaos Lazarou (GRE)		Tadeusz Godyń (POL)	3	3
0	0	Metin Alakoç (TUR)	DQ	Adriano Morais (POR)	4	4
0	0	Seyed Hossein Moareb (IRI)	TF / 8:00	Yehya Mohamed Hassanein (EGY)	4	4
0	0	Dimitar Galinchev (BUL)	DQ	Rahal Mahassine (MAR)	4	4
2.5	2.5	Sreten Damjanović (YUG)		Kim Ik-Jong (KOR)	2.5	2.5
3	3	József Rusznyák (HUN)		Jim Hazewinkel (USA)	1	1
0	0	Roman Rurua (URS)	TF / 5:28	Ismail Al-Karaghouli (IRQ)	4	4
0.5	0.5	Simion Popescu (ROU)		Ponciano Contreras (MEX)	3.5	3.5
2	2	Lothar Schneider (GDR)		Martti Laakso (FIN)	2	2
0	0	Léonard Dutz (BEL)	TF / 2:49	Tortillano Tumasis (PHI)	4	4
0	0	Hideo Fujimoto (JPN)		Bye		

=== 2nd round ===
TPP	MPP		Score		MPP	TPP
0	0	Hideo Fujimoto (JPN)	TF / 0:20	José Luis García (GUA)	4	8
4	4	Jiří Švec (TCH)	DQ	Nikolaos Lazarou (GRE)	4	5
8	4	Adriano Morais (POR)	DQ	Tadeusz Godyń (POL)	4	7
1	1	Metin Alakoç (TUR)		Seyed Hossein Moareb (IRI)	3	3
1	1	Dimitar Galinchev (BUL)		Yehya Hassanein (EGY)	3	7
8	4	Rahal Mahassine (MAR)		Kim Ik-Jong (KOR)	0	2.5
2.5	0	Sreten Damjanović (YUG)	TF / 2:23	József Rusznyák (HUN)	4	7
5	4	Jim Hazewinkel (USA)	TF / 6:23	Roman Rurua (URS)	0	0
3	1	Martti Laakso (FIN)		Ponciano Contreras (MEX)	3	6.5
8	4	Tortillano Tumasis (PHI)	TF / 2:13	Simion Popescu (ROU)	0	0.5
3	1	Lothar Schneider (GDR)		Léonard Dutz (BEL)	3	3
4		Ismail Al-Karaghouli (IRQ)		DNA		

=== 3rd round ===
TPP	MPP		Score		MPP	TPP
1	1	Hideo Fujimoto (JPN)		Jiří Švec (TCH)	3	7
1	0	Metin Alakoç (TUR)		Nikolaos Lazarou (GRE)	4	9
7	4	Seyed Hossein Moareb (IRI)	TF / 1:20	Dimitar Galinchev (BUL)	0	1
6	3.5	Kim Ik-Jong (KOR)		Jim Hazewinkel (USA)	0.5	5.5
0	0	Roman Rurua (URS)	TF / 4:37	Sreten Damjanović (YUG)	4	6.5
2.5	2	Simion Popescu (ROU)		Lothar Schneider (GDR)	2	5
3	0	Martti Laakso (FIN)	DQ	Léonard Dutz (BEL)	4	9

=== 4th round ===
TPP	MPP		Score		MPP	TPP
3	2	Metin Alakoç (TUR)		Hideo Fujimoto (JPN)	2	3
8.5	3	Jim Hazewinkel (USA)		Dimitar Galinchev (BUL)	1	2
0	0	Roman Rurua (URS)	TF / 8:56	Lothar Schneider (GDR)	4	9
3.5	1	Simion Popescu (ROU)		Martti Laakso (FIN)	3	6

=== 5th round ===
TPP	MPP		Score		MPP	TPP
5	3	Dimitar Galinchev (BUL)		Hideo Fujimoto (JPN)	1	4
6	3	Metin Alakoç (TUR)		Roman Rurua (URS)	1	1
3.5		Simion Popescu (ROU)		Bye		

=== 6th round ===
TPP	MPP		Score		MPP	TPP
5	1	Hideo Fujimoto (JPN)		Simion Popescu (ROU)	3	6.5
2	1	Roman Rurua (URS)	TF / 2:32	Dimitar Galinchev (BUL)	3	8

=== Final round ===
TPP	MPP		Score		MPP	TPP
7	2	Hideo Fujimoto (JPN)		Roman Rurua (URS)	2	4

== Final standings ==
1. Roman Rurua (URS)
2. Hideo Fujimoto (JPN)
3. Simion Popescu (ROU)
4. Dimitar Galinchev (BUL)
5. Metin Alakoç (TUR)
6. Martti Laakso (FIN)
