= Wrestling at the 1968 Summer Olympics – Men's freestyle 63 kg =

Men's freestyle 63 kg at the Games of the XIX Olympiad
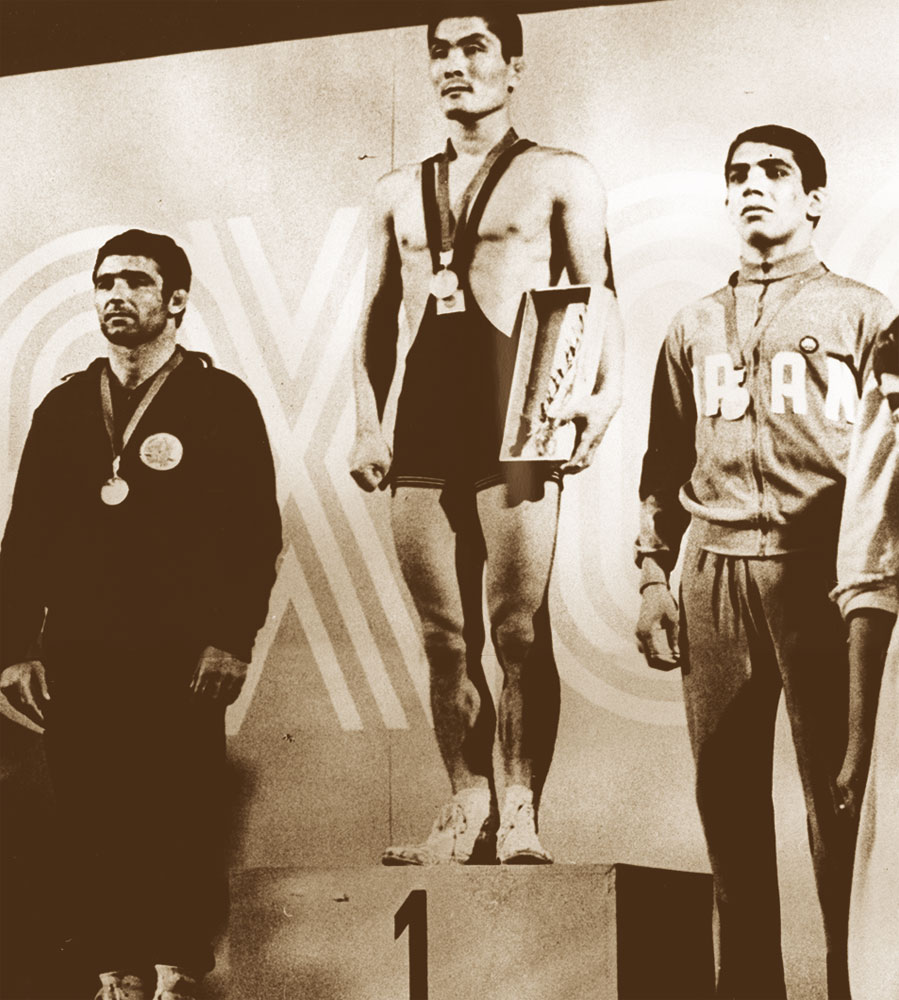
- Medal winners
- Venue: Insurgentes Ice Rink
- Dates: 17–20 October 1968
- Competitors: 23 from 23 nations

Medalists
1st place, gold medalist(s)		Masaaki Kaneko	Japan
2nd place, silver medalist(s)		Enyu Todorov	Bulgaria
3rd place, bronze medalist(s)		Shamseddin Seyed-Abbasi	Iran

The Men's Freestyle featherweight at the 1968 Summer Olympics as part of the wrestling program were held at the Insurgentes Ice Rink. The featherweight was the third-lightest weight class, allowing wrestlers up to 63 kilograms.

== Medalists ==
Gold	Masaaki Kaneko; Japan
Silver	Enyu Todorov; Bulgaria
Bronze	Shamseddin Seyed-Abbasi; Iran

== Tournament results ==
The competition used a form of negative points tournament, with negative points given for any result short of a fall. Accumulation of 6 negative points eliminated the wrestler. When only two or three wrestlers remain, a special final round is used to determine the order of the medals.

Legend

- TF — Won by Fall
- DQ — Won by Passivity or forfeit
- D2 — Both wrestlers lost by Passivity
- DNA — Did not appear
- TPP — Total penalty points
- MPP — Match penalty points

Penalties

- 0 — Won by Fall and Disqualification
- 0.5 — Won by Technical Superiority
- 1 — Won by Points
- 2 — Draw
- 2.5 — Draw, Passivity
- 3 — Lost by Points
- 3.5 — Lost by Technical Superiority
- 4 — Lost by Fall and Disqualification

=== 1st round ===
TPP	MPP		Score		MPP	TPP
1	1	Vehbi Akdağ (TUR)		Jürgen Luczak (GDR)	3	3
3	3	Bobby Douglas (USA)		Shamseddin Seyed-Abbasi (IRI)	1	1
1	1	Yelkan Tedeyev (URS)		Mohammad Ebrahimi (AFG)	3	3
3	3	Tadeusz Godyń (POL)		Tsedendambyn Natsagdorj (MGL)	1	1
4	4	Gabriel Ruz (MEX)	TF / 2:47	Masaaki Kaneko (JPN)	0	0
0	0	Choi Jeong-hyeok (KOR)	TF / 2:24	Onésimo Rufino (DOM)	4	4
0.5	0.5	Petre Coman (ROU)		John McCourtney (GBR)	3.5	3.5
3	3	Patrick Bolger (CAN)		József Rusznyák (HUN)	1	1
0	0	Enyu Todorov (BUL)	TF / 10:09	José Ramos (CUB)	4	4
0	0	Ismail Al-Karaghouli (IRQ)	TF / 5:45	José García (GUA)	4	4
4	4	Antonio Senosa (PHI)	TF / 6:15	Nikolaos Karypidis (GRE)	0	0
0		Josef Engel (TCH)		Bye		

=== 2nd round ===
TPP	MPP		Score		MPP	TPP
3	3	Josef Engel (TCH)		Vehbi Akdağ (TUR)	1	2
6.5	3.5	Hans-Jürgen Luczak (GDR)		Shamseddin Seyed-Abbasi (IRI)	0.5	1.5
1	0	Yelkan Tedeyev (URS)	TF / 9:04	Tadeusz Godyń (POL)	4	7
5	2	Mohammad Ebrahimi (AFG)		Tsedendambyn Natsagdorj (MGL)	2	3
7	3	Gabriel Ruz (MEX)		Choi Jung-Heuk (KOR)	1	1
0	0	Masaaki Kaneko (JPN)	TF / 2:06	Onésimo Rufino (DOM)	4	8
1	0.5	Petre Coman (ROU)		Patrick Bolger (CAN)	3.5	6.5
7.5	4	John McCourtney (GBR)	TF / 5:45	József Rusznyák (HUN)	0	1
0.5	0.5	Enyu Todorov (BUL)		Ismail Al-Karaghouli (IRQ)	3.5	3.5
4	0	José Ramos (CUB)	TF / 5:57	Antonio Senosa (PHI)	4	8
8	4	José García (GUA)	TF / 4:47	Nikolaos Karypidis (GRE)	0	0
3		Bobby Douglas (USA)		DNA		

=== 3rd round ===
TPP	MPP		Score		MPP	TPP
7	4	Josef Engel (TCH)	TF / 8:39	Shamseddin Seyed-Abbasi (IRI)	0	1.5
4	2	Vehbi Akdağ (TUR)		Yelkan Tedeyev (URS)	2	3
6.5	3.5	Tsedendambyn Natsagdorj (MGL)		Masaaki Kaneko (JPN)	0.5	0.5
4	3	Choi Jung-Heuk (KOR)		Petre Coman (ROU)	1	2
4.5	3.5	József Rusznyák (HUN)		Enyu Todorov (BUL)	0.5	1
6	2	José Ramos (CUB)		Ismail Al-Karaghouli (IRQ)	2	5.5
0		Nikolaos Karypidis (GRE)		Bye		
5		Mohammad Ebrahimi (AFG)		DNA		

=== 4th round ===
TPP	MPP		Score		MPP	TPP
2.5	2.5	Nikolaos Karypidis (GRE)		Vehbi Akdağ (TUR)	2.5	6.5
2.5	1	Shamseddin Seyed-Abbasi (IRI)		Yelkan Tedeyev (URS)	3	6
0.5	0	Masaaki Kaneko (JPN)	TF / 5:31	Choi Jung-Heuk (KOR)	4	8
5	3	Petre Coman (ROU)		Enyu Todorov (BUL)	1	2
7.5	3	József Rusznyák (HUN)		Ismail Al-Karaghouli (IRQ)	1	6.5

=== 5th round ===
TPP	MPP		Score		MPP	TPP
6.5	4	Nikolaos Karypidis (GRE)	TF / 1:39	Shamseddin Seyed-Abbasi (IRI)	0	2.5
1.5	1	Masaaki Kaneko (JPN)		Petre Coman (ROU)	3	8
2		Enyu Todorov (BUL)		Bye		

=== Final round ===
Results from the preliminary round are carried forward into the final (shown in yellow).

TPP	MPP		Score		MPP	TPP
	2	Enyu Todorov (BUL)		Shamseddin Seyed-Abbasi (IRI)	2	
	2.5	Masaaki Kaneko (JPN)		Enyu Todorov (BUL)	2.5	4.5
5	3	Shamseddin Seyed-Abbasi (IRI)		Masaaki Kaneko (JPN)	1	3.5

== Final standings ==
1. Masaaki Kaneko (JPN)
2. Enyu Todorov (BUL)
3. Shamseddin Seyed-Abbasi (IRI)
4. Nikolaos Karypidis (GRE)
5. Petre Coman (ROU)
6. Yelkan Tedeyev (URS)
