= Wrestling at the 1968 Summer Olympics – Men's freestyle 52 kg =

Men's freestyle 52 kg at the Games of the XIX Olympiad
- Venue: Insurgentes Ice Rink
- Dates: 17–20 October 1968
- Competitors: 23 from 23 nations

Medalists
1st place, gold medalist(s)		Shigeo Nakata	Japan
2nd place, silver medalist(s)		Richard Sanders	United States
3rd place, bronze medalist(s)		Chimedbazaryn Damdinsharav	Mongolia

The Men's Freestyle flyweight at the 1968 Summer Olympics as part of the wrestling program were held at the Insurgentes Ice Rink. The flyweight was the lightest weight class, allowing wrestlers up to 52 kilograms.

== Medalists ==
Gold	Shigeo Nakata; Japan
Silver	Richard Sanders; United States
Bronze	Chimedbazaryn Damdinsharav; Mongolia

== Tournament results ==
The competition used a form of negative points tournament, with negative points given for any result short of a fall. Accumulation of 6 negative points eliminated the wrestler. When only two or three wrestlers remain, a special final round is used to determine the order of the medals.

Legend

- TF — Won by Fall
- DQ — Won by Passivity or forfeit
- D2 — Both wrestlers lost by Passivity
- DNA — Did not appear
- TPP — Total penalty points
- MPP — Match penalty points

Penalties

- 0 — Won by Fall and Disqualification
- 0.5 — Won by Technical Superiority
- 1 — Won by Points
- 2 — Draw
- 2.5 — Draw, Passivity
- 3 — Lost by Points
- 3.5 — Lost by Technical Superiority
- 4 — Lost by Fall and Disqualification

=== 1st round ===
TPP	MPP		Score		MPP	TPP
4	4	José Defran (DOM)	TF / 1:55	Mohammad Ghorbani (IRI)	0	0
4	4	César Solari (ECU)	DQ / 0:08	Petros Triantafyllidis (GRE)	0	0
1	1	O Jeong-ryong (KOR)		André Gaudinot (FRA)	3	3
1	1	Shigeo Nakata (JPN)		Baju Baev (BUL)	3	3
3	3	Gheorghe Stoiciu (ROU)		Nazar Albaryan (URS)	1	1
4	4	John Kinsella (AUS)	TF / 10:50	Vincenzo Grassi (ITA)	0	0
3	3	Mohamed Mongued (EGY)		Chimedbazaryn Damdinsharav (MGL)	1	1
2.5	2.5	Mehmet Esenceli (TUR)		Paul Neff (FRG)	2.5	2.5
3	3	Florentino Martínez (MEX)		Márton Erdős (HUN)	1	1
0	0	Wanelge Castillo (PAN)	TF / 8:15	Gustavo Ramírez (GUA)	4	4
0.5	0.5	Sudesh Kumar (IND)		Boris Dimovski (YUG)	3.5	3.5
0		Richard Sanders (USA)		Bye		

=== 2nd round ===
TPP	MPP		Score		MPP	TPP
0	0	Richard Sanders (USA)	TF / 1:11	José Defran (DOM)	4	8
0	0	Mohammad Ghorbani (IRI)	TF / 5:00	César Solari (ECU)	4	8
3	3	Petros Triantafyllidis (GRE)		Oh Jung-Yong (KOR)	1	2
6.5	3.5	André Gaudinot (FRA)		Shigeo Nakata (JPN)	0.5	1.5
3	0	Baju Baev (BUL)	TF / 5:30	Gheorghe Stoiciu (ROU)	4	7
1.5	0.5	Nazar Albaryan (URS)		John Kinsella (AUS)	3.5	7.5
0.5	0.5	Vincenzo Grassi (ITA)		Mohamed Mongued (EGY)	3.5	6.5
1	0	Chimedbazaryn Damdinsharav (MGL)	TF / 10:14	Mehmet Esenceli (TUR)	4	6.5
2.5	0	Paul Neff (FRG)	TF / 6:40	Florentino Martínez (MEX)	4	7
2	1	Márton Erdős (HUN)		Wanelge Castillo (PAN)	3	3
8	4	Gustavo Ramírez (GUA)	TF / 5:32	Sudesh Kumar (IND)	0	0.5
3.5		Boris Dimovski (YUG)		Bye		

=== 3rd round ===
TPP	MPP		Score		MPP	TPP
7.5	4	Boris Dimovski (YUG)	TF / 8:41	Richard Sanders (USA)	0	0
0	0	Mohammad Ghorbani (IRI)	TF / 8:43	Petros Triantafyllidis (GRE)	4	7
5	3	Oh Jung-Yong (KOR)		Shigeo Nakata (JPN)	1	2.5
6	3	Baju Baev (BUL)		Nazar Albaryan (URS)	1	2.5
0.5	0	Vincenzo Grassi (ITA)	DQ	Chimedbazaryn Damdinsharav (MGL)	4	5
3.5	1	Paul Neff (FRG)		Márton Erdős (HUN)	3	5
4	1	Wanelge Castillo (PAN)		Sudesh Kumar (IND)	3	3.5

=== 4th round ===
TPP	MPP		Score		MPP	TPP
0	0	Richard Sanders (USA)	TF / 2:48	Mohammad Ghorbani (IRI)	4	4
6	1	Oh Jung-Yong (KOR)		Nazar Albaryan (URS)	3	5.5
3.5	1	Shigeo Nakata (JPN)		Vincenzo Grassi (ITA)	3	3.5
5	0	Chimedbazaryn Damdinsharav (MGL)	TF / 5:44	Márton Erdős (HUN)	4	9
4	0.5	Paul Neff (FRG)		Wanelge Castillo (PAN)	3.5	7.5
3.5		Sudesh Kumar (IND)		Bye		

=== 5th round ===
TPP	MPP		Score		MPP	TPP
7.5	4	Sudesh Kumar (IND)	TF / 1:34	Richard Sanders (USA)	0	0
8	4	Mohammad Ghorbani (IRI)	TF / 6:32	Shigeo Nakata (JPN)	0	3.5
6.5	1	Nazar Albaryan (URS)		Vincenzo Grassi (ITA)	3	6.5
5	0	Chimedbazaryn Damdinsharav (MGL)	DNA	Paul Neff (FRG)	4	8

=== Final round ===
Results from the preliminary round are carried forward into the final (shown in yellow).

TPP	MPP		Score		MPP	TPP
	3	Richard Sanders (USA)		Shigeo Nakata (JPN)	1	
	3	Chimedbazaryn Damdinsharav (MGL)		Richard Sanders (USA)	1	4
1	0	Shigeo Nakata (JPN)	TF / 5:07	Chimedbazaryn Damdinsharav (MGL)	4	7

== Final standings ==
1. Shigeo Nakata (JPN)
2. Richard Sanders (USA)
3. Chimedbazaryn Damdinsharav (MGL)
4. Nazar Albaryan (URS)
5. Vincenzo Grassi (ITA)
6. Sudesh Kumar (IND)
