= Dan Gable =

American wrestler and coach (born 1948)

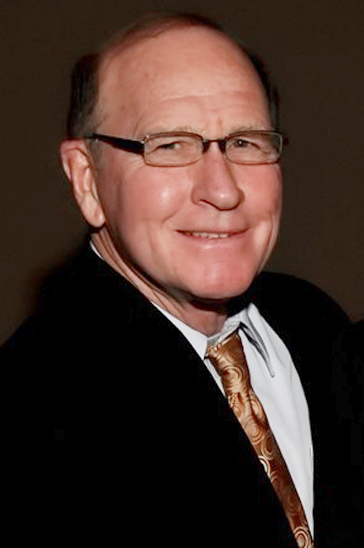
- Gable in 2014

Personal information
- Full name: Danny Mack Gable
- Born: October 25, 1948 (age 77) Waterloo, Iowa, U.S.
- Height: 5 ft 9 in (175 cm)
- Weight: 68 kg (150 lb)

Sport
- Country: United States
- Sport: Wrestling
- Events: Freestyle and Folkstyle
- College team: Iowa State
- Team: USA
- Coached by: Harold Nichols
Medal record
Men's freestyle wrestling
Representing the United States
Olympic Games
Gold medal – first place	1972 Munich	68 kg
World Championships
Gold medal – first place	1971 Sofia	68 kg
Pan American Games
Gold medal – first place	1971 Cali	68 kg
Collegiate Wrestling
Representing the Iowa State Cyclones
NCAA Division I Championships
Gold medal – first place	1968 State College	130 lb
Gold medal – first place	1969 Provo	137 lb
Silver medal – second place	1970 Evanston	142 lb

Danny Mack Gable (born October 25, 1948) is an American former folkstyle and freestyle wrestler and coach. Considered to be one of the greatest wrestlers of all time, Gable is a two-time NCAA Division I national champion, a World Wrestling Championships gold medalist, and an Olympic gold medalist. Gable was only the third wrestler to be inducted into the United World Wrestling's Hall of Fame in the Legend category. In 2014, Gable was inducted into the International Sports Hall of Fame and awarded the Presidential Medal of Freedom in 2020.

== Early life ==
Gable was born and grew up in Waterloo, Iowa. When he was 15 years old, a teenager from his neighborhood murdered Gable's 19-year-old sister. Although Gable called his sister's death his "biggest loss", he did not allow the tragedy to affect his focus on wrestling. Instead, he thought of it as a reason to train with even more determination:

The more you can settle into focusing on what you have and what you would like to do and where you want to go—a positive point of view—the quicker things turn around and positive things start to happen.

He attended high school at West High School in Waterloo. During high school he was a three-time Iowa state champion with a 64–0 record.

== Wrestling career ==
=== College ===
From 1967 to 1970, Gable attended Iowa State University, where he competed in wrestling. At Iowa State, he became a two-time NCAA Division I national champion and three-time finalist. Gable's college career record was 117–1, with his only loss being in the NCAA final match during his senior season to Larry Owings of Washington.

=== Freestyle ===
From 1971 to 1973, Gable competed internationally in freestyle wrestling. Highlights of his career include gold medals at the 1971 Tbilisi Tournament, the 1971 World Championships, and the 1972 Olympic Games. At both the 1971 World Championships and 1972 Olympic Games, Gable won all of his matches without giving up a point. After competing sporadically from 1974 to 1975, Gable retired and became a full-time coach. In 1991, Gable was awarded with the Art Abrams Lifetime Achievement Award by Cauliflower Alley Club.

== Coaching career ==
From 1976 to 1997, Gable was the head wrestling coach at the University of Iowa. Gable's teams compiled a dual meet record of 355–21–5. He coached 158 All-Americans, 50 national champions, 106 Big Ten champions, and 12 Olympians, including eight Olympic medalists. His teams won 21 Big Ten championships and 15 NCAA Division I titles.

In addition to coaching folkstyle wrestling at the University of Iowa, Gable coached freestyle wrestling. Gable was the head coach of three USA Olympic teams and six USA World teams.

== Legacy ==
Gable has been written about in many magazines and numerous books, including Two Guys Named Dan (1976), From Gotch to Gable: A History of Wrestling in Iowa (1981), The Toughest Men in Sports (1984) and Legends of the Mat (2006), all by wrestling historian Mike Chapman.

The 2008 film, Never Back Down, mentioned Dan Gable. The antagonist and protagonist early in the film seem to bond over this Iowa athlete as the, 'greatest Olympic wrestler ever... the '72 Games, never surrendered a point.'

The Dan Gable museum is named for him, which is located in his hometown of Waterloo, Iowa, part of the National Wrestling Hall of Fame and Museum.

Professional wrestler Chad Gable's WWE in-ring name was named after him.

Olympic gold medalist freestyle wrestler Gable Steveson was named after him.

The Gable grip used in grappling and mixed martial arts was named after him. The "Gable arm bars" pinning combo was invented by him.

The production of biopic movie "Gable" started in Illinois on August 17th 2026 and wrapped production on September 18th 2026. This movie will tell the story of Dan Gable from the family tragedy leading all the way to his 1972 Summer Olympics success in Munich. The movie will star Finn Cole, who will be taking on the lead role of Dan Gable, and Ben Foster, Mireille Enos and Ella Bright in other key roles in the cast. A release date is not yet available at this moment.

== Awards and honors ==
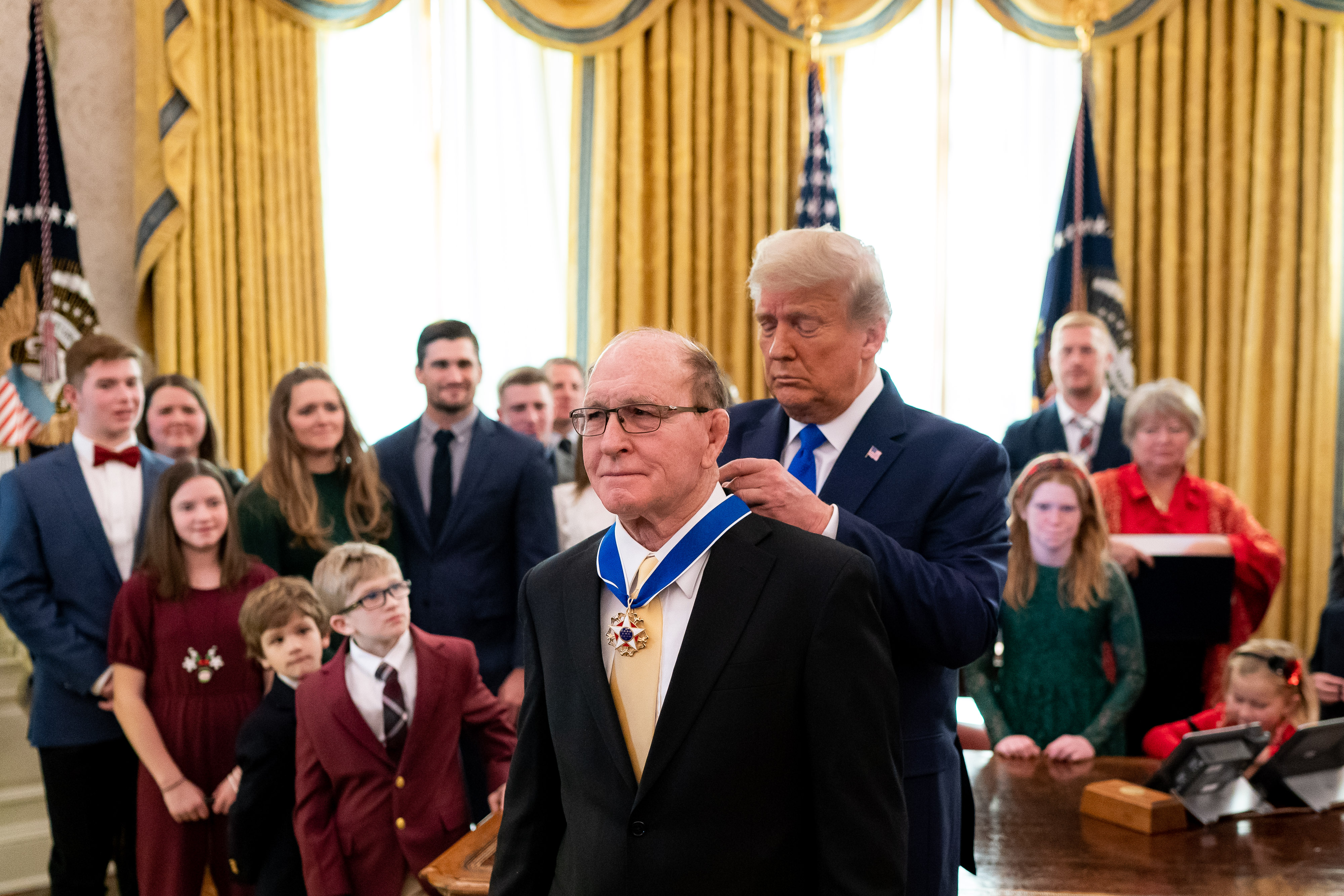
Gable receives the Presidential Medal of Freedom from Donald Trump on December 7, 2020

2020

- Presidential Medal of Freedom

1984

- National High School Hall of Fame

1980

- National Wrestling Hall of Fame Distinguished Member

1972

- (gold) Summer Olympics
- (gold) Tbilisi Tournament
- (gold) Midlands Championships

1971

- (gold) World Wrestling Championships
- (gold) Pan American Games
- (gold) Midlands Championships

1970

- (silver) NCAA Division I
- NCAA Division I Gorrarian Award winner
- (gold) Big Eight Conference
- (gold) Midlands Championships

1969

- NCAA Most Outstanding Wrestler
- (gold) NCAA Division I
- NCAA Division I Gorrarian Award winner
- (gold) Big Eight Conference
- (gold) Midlands Championships

1968

- (gold) NCAA Division I
- (gold) Big Eight Conference
- (gold) Midlands Championships

1967

- (gold) Midlands Championships

== Match results ==
World Championships & Olympic Games Matches
Res.	Record	Opponent	Score	Date	Event	Location
1972 Olympic (gold) at 68 kg
Win	12–0	(Soviet Union) Ruslan Ashuraliyev	3–0	August 27, 1972	1972 Summer Olympic Games	Munich, West Germany
Win	11–0	(Poland) Włodzimierz Cieślak	Fall	August 27, 1972	1972 Summer Olympic Games	Munich, West Germany
Win	10–0	(Japan) Kikuo Wada	6–0	August 27, 1972	1972 Summer Olympic Games	Munich, West Germany
Win	9–0	(Greece) Stefanos Ioannidis	Fall	August 27, 1972	1972 Summer Olympic Games	Munich, West Germany
Win	8–0	(West Germany) Klaus Rost	20–0	August 27, 1972	1972 Summer Olympic Games	Munich, West Germany
Win	7–0	(Socialist Federal Republic of Yugoslavia) Safer Sali	Fall	August 27, 1972	1972 Summer Olympic Games	Munich, West Germany
1971 World (gold) at 68 kg
Win	6–0	(Bulgaria) Ismail Yuseinov	8–3	August 27, 1971	1971 World Wrestling Championships	Sofia, Bulgaria
Win	5–0	(Japan) Kikuo Wada	Fall	August 27, 1971	1971 World Wrestling Championships	Sofia, Bulgaria
Win	4–0	(Czechoslovakia) Josef Engel	Fall	August 27, 1971	1971 World Wrestling Championships	Sofia, Bulgaria
Win	3–0	(Turkey) Nihat Kabanli	Fall	August 27, 1971	1971 World Wrestling Championships	Sofia, Bulgaria
Win	2–0	(Finland) Eero Suvilehto	Fall	August 27, 1971	1971 World Wrestling Championships	Sofia, Bulgaria
Win	1–0	(Soviet Union) Vasily Kazakov	5–1	August 27, 1971	1971 World Wrestling Championships	Sofia, Bulgaria

== See also ==
- Iowa Sports Hall of Fame

== Bibliography ==
- Baughman, Wayne. 1987. Wrestling On & Off the Mat. R. Wayne Baughman. ISBN 978-0-9618446-0-8
- Chen, Albert. 2014. "Where are they Now: Catching up with Dan Gable and Larry Owings," Sports Illustrated (July 11, 2014)
- Gable, Dan. 2015. A Wrestling Life: The Inspiring Stories of Dan Gable. University of Iowa Press. ISBN 978-1609383404
- Hammond, Jairus K. 2005. The History of Collegiate Wrestling. National Wrestling Hall of Fame and Museum. ISBN 978-0-9765064-0-9
- Moffat, James V. 2007. Wrestlers At The Trials. Exit Zero Publishing. ISBN 978-0-9799051-0-0
- Smith, Russ L. 1973. The Legend of Dan Gable. Medalist Sports Education Publication.
- Zavoral, Nolan. 1997. A Season on the Mat. Simon & Schuster. ISBN 978-1-4165-3553-9
