= Wrestling at the 1972 Summer Olympics – Men's Greco-Roman 62 kg =

Men's Greco-Roman 62 kg at the Games of the XX Olympiad
- Venue: Messe München
- Dates: 5–10 September 1972
- Competitors: 19 from 19 nations

Medalists
1st place, gold medalist(s)		Georgi Markov	Bulgaria
2nd place, silver medalist(s)		Heinz-Helmut Wehling	East Germany
3rd place, bronze medalist(s)		Kazimierz Lipień	Poland

The Men's Greco-Roman 62 kg at the 1972 Summer Olympics as part of the wrestling program at the Fairgrounds, Judo and Wrestling Hall.

== Medalists ==
Gold	Georgi Markov; Bulgaria
Silver	Heinz-Helmut Wehling; East Germany
Bronze	Kazimierz Lipień; Poland

== Tournament results ==
The competition used a form of negative points tournament, with negative points given for any result short of a fall. Accumulation of 6 negative points eliminated the wrestler. When only two or three wrestlers remain, a special final round is used to determine the order of the medals.

Legend

- DNA — Did not appear
- TPP — Total penalty points
- MPP — Match penalty points

Penalties

- 0 — Won by Fall, Passivity, Injury and Forfeit
- 0.5 — Won by Technical Superiority
- 1 — Won by Points
- 2 — Draw
- 2.5 — Draw, Passivity
- 3 — Lost by Points
- 3.5 — Lost by Technical Superiority
- 4 — Lost by Fall, Passivity, Injury and Forfeit

=== Round 1 ===
TPP	MPP		Time		MPP	TPP
4	4	Jim Hazewinkel (USA)	1:41	Slavko Koletić (YUG)	0	0
4	4	Théodule Toulotte (FRA)	8:34	Kazimierz Lipień (POL)	0	0
1	1	László Réczi (HUN)		Jakob Tanner (SUI)	3	3
0	0	Stelios Mygiakis (GRE)	4:21	Mohammad Ebrahimi (AFG)	4	4
0	0	Jemal Megrelishvili (URS)	4:52	Metin Alakoç (TUR)	4	4
4	4	Eliseo Salugta (PHI)	1:34	Georgi Markov (BUL)	0	0
4	4	Carlos Hurtado (PER)	8:24	Harry Van Landeghem (BEL)	0	0
0	0	Martti Laakso (FIN)	6:35	Juan Hernández (GUA)	4	4
1	1	Hideo Fujimoto (JPN)		Heinz-Helmut Wehling (GDR)	3	3
0		Ion Păun (ROU)		Bye		

=== Round 2 ===
TPP	MPP		Time		MPP	TPP
1	1	Ion Păun (ROU)		Jim Hazewinkel (USA)	3	7
0	0	Slavko Koletić (YUG)	7:08	Théodule Toulotte (FRA)	4	8
1	1	Kazimierz Lipień (POL)		László Réczi (HUN)	3	4
7	4	Jakob Tanner (SUI)	7:57	Stelios Mygiakis (GRE)	0	0
0	0	Djemal Megrelishvili (URS)	1:48	Eliseo Salugta (PHI)	4	8
7	3	Metin Alakoç (TUR)		Georgi Markov (BUL)	1	1
8	4	Carlos Hurtado (PER)	4:03	Martti Laakso (FIN)	0	0
3.5	3.5	Harry van Landeghem (BEL)		Hideo Fujimoto (JPN)	0.5	1.5
8	4	Juan Hernández (GUA)	1:30	Heinz-Helmut Wehling (GDR)	0	3
4		Mohammad Ebrahimi (AFG)		DNA		

=== Round 3 ===
TPP	MPP		Time		MPP	TPP
2	1	Ion Păun (ROU)		Slavko Koletić (YUG)	3	3
1	0	Kazimierz Lipień (POL)	5:37	Stelios Mygiakis (GRE)	4	4
7	3	László Réczi (HUN)		Djemal Megrelishvili (URS)	1	1
1	0	Georgi Markov (BUL)	1:22	Harry van Landeghem (BEL)	4	7.5
2	2	Martti Laakso (FIN)		Hideo Fujimoto (JPN)	2	3.5
3		Heinz-Helmut Wehling (GDR)		Bye		

=== Round 4 ===
TPP	MPP		Time		MPP	TPP
5.5	2.5	Heinz-Helmut Wehling (GDR)		Ion Păun (ROU)	2.5	4.5
6.5	3.5	Slavko Koletić (YUG)		Kazimierz Lipień (POL)	0.5	1.5
5	1	Stelios Mygiakis (GRE)		Djemal Megrelishvili (URS)	3	4
2	1	Georgi Markov (BUL)		Martti Laakso (FIN)	3	5
3.5		Hideo Fujimoto (JPN)		Bye		

=== Round 5 ===
TPP	MPP		Time		MPP	TPP
4.5	1	Hideo Fujimoto (JPN)		Ion Păun (ROU)	3	7.5
5.5	0	Heinz-Helmut Wehling (GDR)	7:00	Kazimierz Lipień (POL)	4	5.5
8	3	Stelios Mygiakis (GRE)		Georgi Markov (BUL)	1	3
5	1	Djemal Megrelishvili (URS)		Martti Laakso (FIN)	3	8

=== Round 6 ===
TPP	MPP		Time		MPP	TPP
7.5	3	Hideo Fujimoto (JPN)		Kazimierz Lipień (POL)	1	6.5
6.5	1	Heinz-Helmut Wehling (GDR)		Djemal Megrelishvili (URS)	3	8
3		Georgi Markov (BUL)		Bye		

== Final standings ==
1. Georgi Markov (BUL)
2. Heinz-Helmut Wehling (GDR)
3. Kazimierz Lipień (POL)
4. Hideo Fujimoto (JPN)
5. Djemal Megrelishvili (URS)
6. Ion Păun (ROU)
7. Martti Laakso (FIN) and Stelios Mygiakis (GRE)
