= Wrestling at the 1968 Summer Olympics – Men's freestyle 78 kg =

Men's freestyle welterweight at the Games of the XIX Olympiad
- Venue: Insurgentes Ice Rink
- Date: 17 – 20 October 1968
- Competitors: 19 from 19 nations

Medalists
1st place, gold medalist(s)		Mahmut Atalay	Turkey
2nd place, silver medalist(s)		Daniel Robin	France
3rd place, bronze medalist(s)		Tömöriin Artag	Mongolia

The Men's Freestyle welterweight at the 1968 Summer Olympics as part of the wrestling program were held at the Insurgentes Ice Rink from October 17 to October 20. The welterweight allowed wrestlers up to 78 kilograms.

== Tournament results ==
The competition used a form of negative points tournament, with negative points given for any result short of a fall. Accumulation of 6 negative points eliminated the wrestler. When only two or three wrestlers remain, a special final round is used to determine the order of the medals.

Legend

- TF — Won by Fall
- DQ — Won by Passivity or forfeit
- D2 — Both wrestlers lost by Passivity
- DNA — Did not appear

Penalties

- 0 — Won by Fall and Disqualification
- 0.5 — Won by Technical Superiority
- 1 — Won by Points
- 2 — Draw
- 2.5 — Draw, Passivity
- 3 — Lost by Points
- 3.5 — Lost by Technical Superiority
- 4 — Lost by Fall and Disqualification

=== 1st round ===
TPP	MPP		Score		MPP	TPP
4	4	Mukhtiar Singh (IND)	TF / 0:37	Yury Shakhmuradov (URS)	0	0
0	0	Brian Heffel (CAN)	TF / 9:14	Wesley O'Brien (AUS)	4	4
1	1	Angel Sotirov (BUL)		Tömöriin Artag (MGL)	3	3
3	3	Anthony Shacklady (GBR)		Károly Bajkó (HUN)	1	1
0.5	0.5	Ali Mohammad Momeni (IRI)		Kayum Ayub (AFG)	3.5	3.5
1	1	Martin Heinze (GDR)		Carlos Romero (MEX)	3	3
1	1	Seo Yong-seok (KOR)		Osvaldo Ferrari (ITA)	3	3
1	1	Mahmut Atalay (TUR)		Steve Combs (USA)	3	3
3	3	Jimmy Martinetti (SUI)		Daniel Robin (FRA)	1	1
		Tatsuo Sasaki (JPN)		Bye		

=== 2nd round ===
TPP	MPP		Score		MPP	TPP
8	4	Mukthiar Singh (IND)	TF / 10:10	Tatsuo Sasaki (JPN)	0	0
0.5	0.5	Yury Shakhmuradov (URS)		Brian Heffel (CAN)	3.5	3.5
8	4	Wesley O'Brien (AUS)	TF / 1:03	Angel Sotirov (BUL)	0	1
3	0	Tömöriin Artag (MGL)	TF / 4:51	Anthony Shacklady (GBR)	4	7
1.5	1	Ali Mohammad Momeni (IRI)		Károly Bajkó (HUN)	3	4
1	0	Martin Heinze (GDR)	DQ	Kayum Ayub (AFG)	4	7.5
7	4	Carlos Romero (MEX)	TF / 10:52	Seo Yong-Seok (KOR)	0	1
6.5	3.5	Osvaldo Ferrari (ITA)		Mahmut Atalay (TUR)	0.5	1.5
4	1	Steve Combs (USA)		Jimmy Martinetti (SUI)	3	6
		Daniel Robin (FRA)		Bye		

=== 3rd round ===
TPP	MPP		Score		MPP	TPP
4	3	Daniel Robin (FRA)		Tatsuo Sasaki (JPN)	1	1
1.5	1	Yury Shakhmuradov (URS)		Angel Sotirov (BUL)	3	4
7.5	4	Brian Heffel (CAN)	TF / 4:38	Tömöriin Artag (MGL)	0	3
5	1	Károly Bajkó (HUN)		Martin Heinze (GDR)	3	4
4.5	3	Ali Mohammad Momeni (IRI)		Mahmut Atalay (TUR)	1	2.5
4	3	Seo Yong-Seok (KOR)		Steve Combs (USA)	1	5

=== 4th round ===
TPP	MPP		Score		MPP	TPP
5.5	4	Yury Shakhmuradov (URS)	DQ	Daniel Robin (FRA)	0	4
5	1	Angel Sotirov (BUL)		Tatsuo Sasaki (JPN)	3	4
4	1	Tömöriin Artag (MGL)		Károly Bajkó (HUN)	3	8
5.5	1	Ali Mohammad Momeni (IRI)		Martin Heinze (GDR)	3	7
8	4	Seo Yong-Seok (KOR)	TF / 8:37	Mahmut Atalay (TUR)	0	2.5
		Steve Combs (USA)		Bye		

=== 5th round ===
TPP	MPP		Score		MPP	TPP
8	3	Steve Combs (USA)		Daniel Robin (FRA)	1	5
8	2.5	Yury Shakhmuradov (URS)		Tatsuo Sasaki (JPN)	2.5	6.5
8	3	Angel Sotirov (BUL)		Ali Mohammad Momeni (IRI)	1	6.5
6	2	Tömöriin Artag (MGL)		Mahmut Atalay (TUR)	2	4.5

=== Final round ===
TPP	MPP		Score		MPP	TPP
5.5	1	Mahmut Atalay (TUR)		Daniel Robin (FRA)	3	8

== Final standings ==
1. Mahmut Atalay (TUR)
2. Daniel Robin (FRA)
3. Tömöriin Artag (MGL)
4. Ali Mohammad Momeni (IRI)
5. Tatsuo Sasaki (JPN)
6. Yury Shakhmuradov (URS)

== Sources ==
- Trueblood, Beatrice, ed. (1969). Official Report of the Organizing Committee of the Games of the XIX Olympiad Mexico 1968 (Volume 3) (PDF). Vol. 3. pp. 335, 721–722. Archived from the original (PDF) on April 28, 2015.
