= Wrestling at the 1968 Summer Olympics – Men's freestyle +97 kg =

Wrestling at the Olympics

Men's freestyle +97 kg at the Games of the XIX Olympiad
- Venue: Insurgentes Ice Rink
- Dates: 17–20 October 1968
- Competitors: 14 from 14 nations

Medalists
1st place, gold medalist(s)		Aleksandr Medved	Soviet Union
2nd place, silver medalist(s)		Osman Duraliev	Bulgaria
3rd place, bronze medalist(s)		Wilfried Dietrich	West Germany

The Men's Freestyle Heavyweight at the 1968 Summer Olympics as part of the wrestling program were held at the Insurgentes Ice Rink. The weight class allowed wrestlers of more than 97 kilograms to compete.

== Results ==
The following wrestlers took part in the event:

Rank	Name	Country
1	Aleksandr Medved	Soviet Union
2	Osman Duraliev	Bulgaria
3	Wilfried Dietrich	West Germany
4	Ştefan Stîngu	Romania
5	Larry Kristoff	United States
6T	Abolfazl Anvari	Iran
6T	Ölziisaikhany Erdene-Ochir	Mongolia
AC	Raymond Uytterhaeghe	France
AC	László Nyers	Hungary
AC	Harry Geris	Canada
AC	Wiesław Bocheński	Poland
AC	Arne Robertsson	Sweden
AC	Yorihide Isogai	Japan
AC	Gıyasettin Yılmaz	Turkey
