= Momeni =

Momeni is an Iranian surname. Notable people with the surname include:

- Abdollah Momeni (born 1977), Iranian student leader and activist
- Ali Mohammad Momeni (born 1937), Iranian wrestler
- Esha Momeni, Iranian and American scholar and activist
- Issa Momeni (born 1968), Iranian wrestler
- Mehdi Momeni (born 1985), Iranian footballer
- Mehrshad Momeni (born 1987), Iranian footballer
- Mohammad Momeni (born 1972), Iranian footballer
- Mostafa Momeni, (1940–2017), Iranian geographer
- Nima Momeni, arrestee in the 2023 death of businessman Bob Lee
- Valiollah Momeni (1944–2015), Iranian actor
