= Petros Triantafyllidis =

Petros Triantafyllidis may refer to:

- Petros Triantafyllidis (wrestler, born 1947), Greek Olympic wrestler
- Petros Triantafyllidis (wrestler, born 1971), his son, Greek Olympic wrestler
