= Carlos Romero =

Carlos Romero may refer to:

- Carlos Romero (actor) (1927–2007), American actor
- Carlos Romero Barceló (1932–2021), Puerto Rican politician, governor from 1977 to 1985
- Carlos Romero Bonifaz (born 1966), Bolivian government official and lawyer
- Carlos Romero Deschamps (1944–2023), Mexican politician and trade-unionist from Tamaulipas
- Carlos Romero (football coach) (born 1966), Salvadorean former footballer and subsequently football manager
- Carlos Romero (footballer, born 1927) (1927–1999), Uruguayan footballer, who played for Danubio
- Carlos Romero (footballer, born 2001), Spanish footballer
- Carlos Romero Galiana (1927–2008), Spanish writer and politician, co-founder of the Cantonal Party
- Carlos Romero Giménez (1890–1978), Spanish Republican officer and French Resistance member
- Carlos Romero López (born 1946), Spanish academic
- Carlos Romero Marchent (1944–2013), Spanish film actor
- Carlos Romero (screenwriter) (1946), Mexican screenwriter, including on telenovela María la del Barrio
- Carlos Romero (Spanish politician) (Carlos Romero Herrera, born 1941), Spanish government minister between 1982 and 1991
- Carlos Romero (wrestler, born 1942), Mexican freestyle wrestler
- Carlos Romero (wrestler, born 1997), Chilean freestyle wrestler
- Carlos Humberto Romero (1924–2017), president of El Salvador in 1977–1979

== See also ==
- Juan Carlos Romero (disambiguation)
