= 1967 World Wrestling Championships =

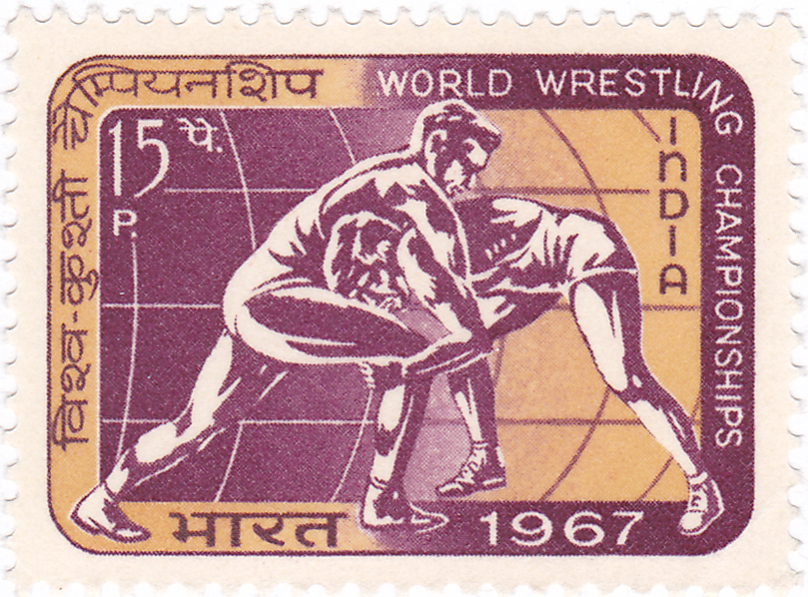

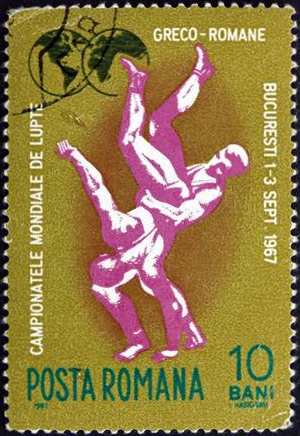

Freestyle
- Host city: New Delhi, India
- Dates: 12–14 November 1967

Greco-Roman
- Host city: Bucharest, Romania
- Dates: 1–3 September 1967

Champions
- Freestyle: Soviet Union
- Greco-Roman: Soviet Union

The following is the final results of the 1967 World Wrestling Championships. Freestyle competition were held in New Delhi, India and Greco-Roman competition were held in Bucharest, Romania.

== Medal table ==
Rank	Nation	Gold	Silver	Bronze	Total
1	Soviet Union	7	6	0	13
2	Hungary	2	2	1	5
3	Japan	2	0	3	5
4	Romania	1	3	1	5
5	Iran	1	0	1	2
5	Turkey	1	0	1	2
7	Finland	1	0	0	1
7	France	1	0	0	1
9	Bulgaria	0	2	2	4
10	United States	0	1	2	3
11	East Germany	0	1	0	1
11	India	0	1	0	1
13	Czechoslovakia	0	0	1	1
13	Mongolia	0	0	1	1
13	Poland	0	0	1	1
13	South Korea	0	0	1	1
13	Sweden	0	0	1	1
Totals (17 entries)		16	16	16	48

== Team ranking ==
Rank	Men's freestyle		Men's Greco-Roman	
Rank	Team	Points	Team	Points
1	Soviet Union	41	Soviet Union	42
2	Japan	22	Hungary	29
3	Iran	17	Romania	26
4	United States	16.5	Bulgaria	13.5
5	Bulgaria	15	Turkey	9.5
6	Turkey	14.5	Finland	8

== Medal summary ==
=== Freestyle ===
Event	Gold	Silver	Bronze
Flyweight; 52 kg	Shigeo Nakata; Japan	Rick Sanders; United States	Oh Jung-yong; South Korea
Bantamweight; 57 kg	Ali Aliev; Soviet Union	Bishambar Singh; India	Aboutaleb Talebi; Iran
Featherweight; 63 kg	Masaaki Kaneko; Japan	Elkan Tedeev; Soviet Union	Mike Young; United States
Lightweight; 70 kg	Abdollah Movahed; Iran	Zarbeg Beriashvili; Soviet Union	Enyu Valchev; Bulgaria
Welterweight; 78 kg	Daniel Robin; France	Guram Sagaradze; Soviet Union	Tatsuo Sasaki; Japan
Middleweight; 87 kg	Boris Gurevich; Soviet Union	Francisc Balla; Romania	Jigjidiin Mönkhbat; Mongolia
Light heavyweight 97 kg	Ahmet Ayık; Turkey	Shota Lomidze; Soviet Union	Said Mustafov; Bulgaria
Heavyweight +97 kg	Aleksandr Medved; Soviet Union	Osman Duraliev; Bulgaria	Larry Kristoff; United States

=== Greco-Roman ===
Event	Gold	Silver	Bronze
Flyweight; 52 kg	Vladimir Bakulin; Soviet Union	Cornel Turturea; Romania	Imre Alker; Hungary
Bantamweight; 57 kg	Ion Baciu; Romania	János Varga; Hungary	Tsutomu Hanahara; Japan
Featherweight; 63 kg	Roman Rurua; Soviet Union	Simion Popescu; Romania	Hideo Fujimoto; Japan
Lightweight; 70 kg	Eero Tapio; Finland	Antal Steer; Hungary	Vahap Pehlivan; Turkey
Welterweight; 78 kg	Viktor Igumenov; Soviet Union	Rudolf Vesper; East Germany	Jan Kårström; Sweden
Middleweight; 87 kg	László Sillai; Hungary	Valentin Olenik; Soviet Union	Wacław Orłowski; Poland
Light heavyweight 97 kg	Nikolay Yakovenko; Soviet Union	Boyan Radev; Bulgaria	Nicolae Martinescu; Romania
Heavyweight +97 kg	István Kozma; Hungary	Anatoly Roshchin; Soviet Union	Petr Kment; Czechoslovakia
