= Sukhe (disambiguation) =

Sukhe may refer to:

- Sukhe (rapper), Indian singer-songwriter and music producer
- Sukhe (unit), a currency of the Mongol Empire

== See also ==
- Sükhbaatar (disambiguation) (aka Sukhe-Bator, literally axe hero)
- Sukh (disambiguation)
