= Wehling =

Wehling is a surname. Notable people with the surname include:

- Heinz-Helmut Wehling (born 1950), German wrestler
- Ulrich Wehling (born 1952), German skier
