= Eduardo Quintero =

Eduardo Quintero may refer to:

- Eduardo Quintero (diplomat)
- Eduardo Quintero (wrestler)
- Eduardo Quintero (baseball)
