= Juan Pablo Romero =

Juan Pablo Romero may refer to:

- Juan Pablo Romero (boxer) (born 1990), Mexican boxer
- Juan Pablo Romero (footballer) (born 1998), Argentine footballer
- Juan Pablo Romero Fuentes (born 1983), Guatemalan schoolteacher and community organizer
