= Harry Van Landeghem =

Belgian wrestler

Personal information
- Nationality: Belgian
- Born: 16 June 1949 (age 77) Kruibeke, Belgium

Sport
- Sport: Wrestling

Harry Van Landeghem (born 16 June 1949) is a Belgian wrestler. He competed in the men's Greco-Roman 62 kg at the 1972 Summer Olympics.
