= José Manuel Hernández (wrestler) =

Guatemalan wrestler (born 1941)

Personal information
- Born: 24 February 1941 (age 85) Ververena, Guatemala

Sport
- Sport: Wrestling

José Manuel Hernández (born 24 February 1941) is a Guatemalan wrestler. He competed in two events at the 1968 Summer Olympics.
