= Márton Erdős =

Hungarian wrestler (1944–2020)

Personal information
- Born: 17 September 1944 Budapest, Hungary
- Died: 25 November 2020 (aged 76) Budapest, Hungary

Sport
- Country: Hungary
- Sport: Wrestling

Márton Erdős (17 September 1944 – 25 November 2020) was a Hungarian wrestler. He competed in the men's freestyle 52 kg at the 1968 Summer Olympics.
