= Léonard Dutz =

Belgian wrestler

Personal information
- Nationality: Belgian
- Born: 6 August 1947 Kelmis, Belgium
- Died: 27 July 2025 (aged 77)

Sport
- Sport: Wrestling

Léonard Dutz (6 August 1947 – 27 July 2025) was a Belgian wrestler. He competed in the men's Greco-Roman 63 kg at the 1968 Summer Olympics.
