= Boris Dimovski =

Yugoslav wrestler (born 1943)

Personal information
- Nationality: Yugoslav
- Born: 18 March 1943 (age 83) Zelenikovo, Yugoslavia

Sport
- Sport: Wrestling

Boris Dimovski (born 18 March 1943) is a Yugoslav wrestler. He competed in the men's freestyle 52 kg at the 1968 Summer Olympics.
