= Brian Heffel =

Canadian wrestler

Personal information
- Born: 17 May 1944; Canada
- Died: 11 January 2013 (aged 68); Edmonton, Alberta, Canada

Sport
- Sport: Wrestling

Brian Heffel (17 May 1944 – 11 January 2013) was a Canadian wrestler. He competed in two events at the 1968 Summer Olympics.
