= Georgi Markov (wrestler) =

Bulgarian wrestler (born 1946)

Medal record

Men's Greco-Roman wrestling

Representing Bulgaria

Olympic Games
Gold medal – first place	1972 Munich	Featherweight

Georgi Markov (Bulgarian: Георги Мърков, born April 5, 1946) is a Bulgarian retired Greco-Roman wrestler. He was born in 1946, in Gorno Vyrshilo, Pazardzhik province.

Markov was a European Champion and a World Champion, but is probably best-known for winning an Olympic gold medal at the 1972 Summer Olympics.

At the 1984 European Championships, in Jönköping, Markov disabled an intruder with a gun who attempted to disrupt the games.

He was awarded the degree of Doctor Honoris Causa.
