= Ponciano Contreras =

Mexican wrestler

Personal information
- Born: 16 April 1947 (age 79) Durango, Mexico

Sport
- Sport: Wrestling

Ponciano Contreras (born 16 April 1947) is a Mexican wrestler. He competed in the men's Greco-Roman 63 kg at the 1968 Summer Olympics.
