= Adriano Morais =

Portuguese wrestler

Personal information
- Nationality: Portuguese
- Born: 21 February 1948 (age 78) Runa, Portugal

Sport
- Sport: Wrestling

Adriano Morais (born 21 February 1948) is a Portuguese wrestler. He competed in the men's Greco-Roman 63 kg at the 1968 Summer Olympics.
