= Osvaldo Ferrari =

Italian wrestler

Personal information
- Nationality: Italian
- Born: 30 September 1942 (age 83) Genoa, Italy

Sport
- Sport: Wrestling

Osvaldo Ferrari (born 30 September 1942) is an Italian wrestler. He competed in the men's freestyle 78 kg at the 1968 Summer Olympics.
