= Tömöriin Artag =

Mongolian wrestler (1943–1993)

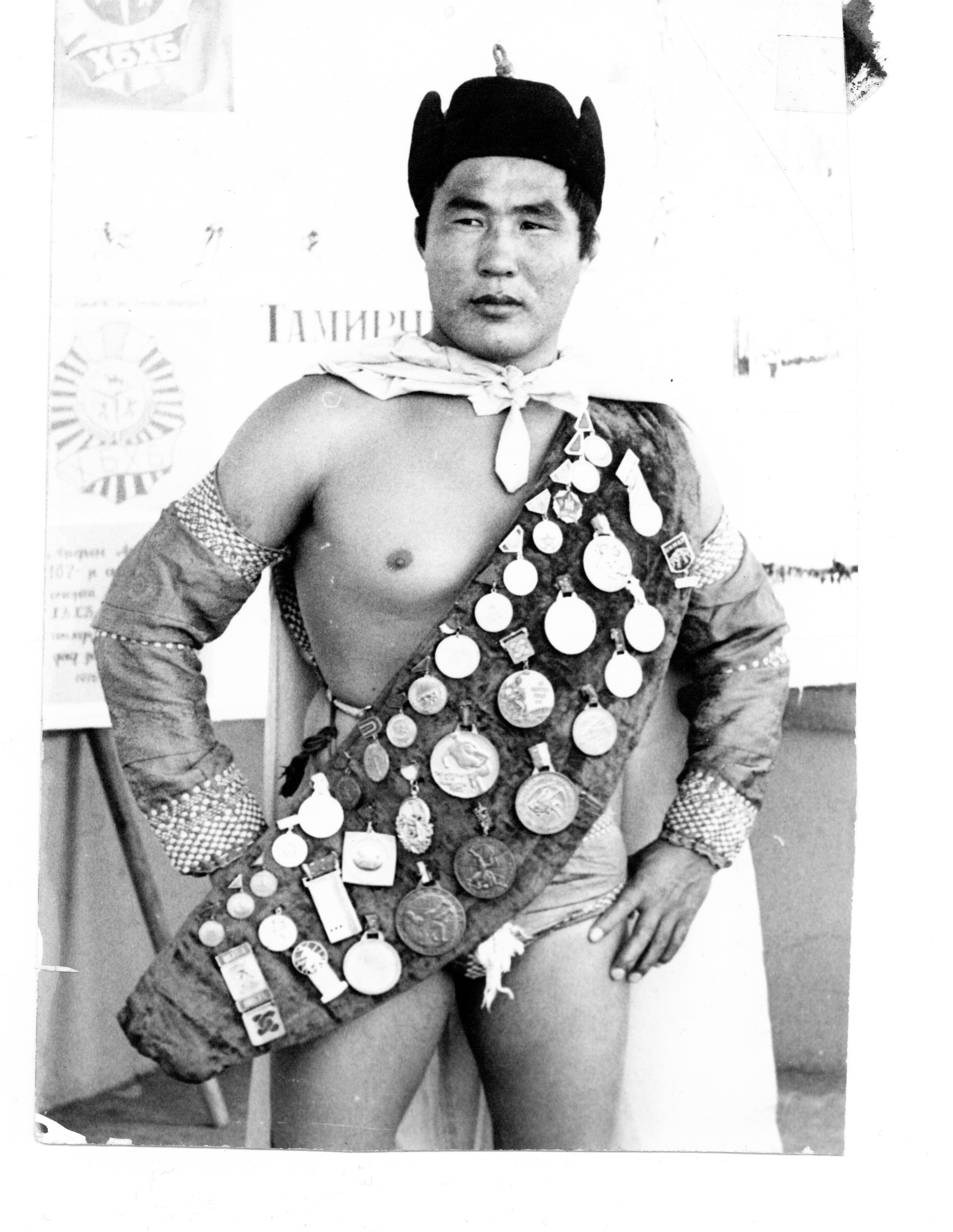

Personal information
- Native name: Төмөрийн Артаг
- Nationality: Mongolia
- Born: 10 April 1943 (age 83) Tes, Uvs Province, Mongolia
- Died: 1993 Mongolia

Sport
- Country: Mongolia
- Sport: Mongolian wrestling
Medal record
Men's freestyle wrestling
Representing Mongolia
Olympic Games
Bronze medal – third place	1968 Mexico City	Welterweight

Tömöriin Artag (Mongolian: Төмөрийн Артаг; 10 April 1943 – 1993) was a Mongolian wrestler. At the 1968 Summer Olympics he won the bronze medal in the men's Freestyle Welterweight category. Artag lost to Angel Sotirov of Bulgaria by points, but wrestled to the draw against eventual Olympic сhampion and 1966 World сhampion Mahmut Atalay from Turkey, securing 3rd place at the Olympics.
