= Suh Young-suk =

South Korean wrestler (born 1942)

Personal information
- Nationality: South Korean
- Born: 28 January 1942 (age 84) Yesan, South Korea

Sport
- Sport: Wrestling

Suh Young-suk (born 28 January 1942) is a South Korean wrestler. He competed in the men's freestyle 78 kg at the 1968 Summer Olympics.
