= Jemal Megrelishvili =

Soviet wrestler (born 1950)

Personal information
- Nationality: Soviet
- Born: 28 February 1950 (age 76)

Sport
- Sport: Wrestling
Medal record
Representing Soviet Union
Summer Universiade
Gold medal – first place	1973 Moscow	62 kg

Jemal Megrelishvili (born 28 February 1950) is a Soviet wrestler. He competed in the men's Greco-Roman 62 kg at the 1972 Summer Olympics and was affiliated with Dynamo Tbilisi.
