= Slavko Koletić =

Yugoslavian wrestler

Personal information
- Nationality: Croatian
- Born: 3 July 1950 Petrinja, Yugoslavia
- Died: 10 August 2010 (aged 60) Petrinja, Croatia

Sport
- Sport: Wrestling

Slavko Koletić (3 July 1950 – 10 August 2010) was a Yugoslavian wrestler. He competed in the men's Greco-Roman 62 kg at the 1972 Summer Olympics.
