= Juan Romero =

Juan Romero is the name of:

- Juan Romero (bullfighter), Spanish bullfighter
- Juan Romero de Figueroa (1646–1720), Spanish Roman Catholic priest
- Juan Romero (judoka) (born 1988), Uruguayan judoka
- Juan Romero (1950–2018), Mexican-American busboy, photographed as the last person to shake Robert F. Kennedy's hand before he was assassinated in 1968
- Title character in "The Transition of Juan Romero", a 1910 short story by American horror fiction writer H. P. Lovecraft
- Juan Ángel Romero (1934–2009), Paraguayan footballer and manager
- Juan Carlos Romero (athlete) (born 1977), Mexican long-distance runner
- Juan Carlos Romero Hicks (born 1955), Mexican politician from Guanajuato
- Juan Carlos Romero (politician) (born 1950), Argentine Justicialist Party politician
- Juan Carlos Romero (sport shooter) (born 1963), Guatemalan sport shooter
- Juan Cristóbal Romero (born 1974), Chilean poet, winner of the Santiago Municipal Literature Award in 2009
- Juan Pablo Romero (boxer) (born 1990), Mexican boxer
- Juan Pablo Romero (footballer) (born 1998), Argentine football goalkeeper
- Juan Pablo Romero Fuentes (born 1983), Guatemalan schoolteacher and community organizer
