= Sukh =

Sukh signifies the following:

- Sukha or sukh, happiness in Sanskrit, the opposite of duḥkha (sadness)
- Sükh, the axe of Mongolian revolutionary Damdin Sükhbaatar
- Sukh, a fictional deity in the Fighting Fantasy game

People

- Sukh Chungh (born 1992), Canadian football player
- Sukh Dhaliwal, Canadian businessman and politician in British Columbia
- Sukh Ojla (born 1984), English stand-up comedian
- Sukh Ram, former member of the Parliament of India
- Raja Sukh Jivan, historical ruler of Kashmir

== See also ==
- Sukha (disambiguation)
- Sukhe (disambiguation)
