= Wiesław Bocheński =

Polish wrestler (1944–2021)

Personal information
- Nationality: Polish
- Born: 7 January 1944 Warsaw, Poland
- Died: 7 March 2021 (aged 77)

Sport
- Sport: Wrestling

Wiesław Bocheński (7 January 1944 – 7 March 2021) was a Polish wrestler. He competed in the men's freestyle +97 kg at the 1968 Summer Olympics.
