= Onésimo Rufino =

Dominican Republic wrestler

Personal information
- Full name: Onésimo Antonio Rufino Gomez
- Nationality: Dominican
- Born: 7 June 1947 (age 79) Santiago de los Caballeros, Dominican Republic

Sport
- Sport: Wrestling

Onésimo Rufino (born 7 June 1947) is a Dominican Republic wrestler. He competed in the men's freestyle 63 kg at the 1968 Summer Olympics.
