= Nikolaos Lazarou =

Greek wrestler

Personal information
- Nationality: Greek
- Born: 1942 (age 83–84)

Sport
- Sport: Wrestling

Nikolaos Lazarou (born 6 August 1942) is a Greek wrestler. He competed in the men's Greco-Roman 63 kg at the 1968 Summer Olympics.
