= Steve Combs =

American wrestler

Personal information
- Born: July 22, 1941 (age 85) Moline, Illinois, U.S.

Sport
- Country: United States
- Sport: Wrestling
- Events: Freestyle and Folkstyle
- College team: Iowa
- Club: Mayor Daley Youth Foundation
- Team: USA
Medal record
Collegiate Wrestling
Representing the Iowa Hawkeyes
NCAA Division I Championships
Silver medal – second place	1963 Kent	167 lb

Steve Combs (born July 22, 1941) is an American wrestler. He competed in the men's freestyle 78 kg at the 1968 Summer Olympics. Combs wrestled collegiately at Iowa, where he was a Big Ten champion and NCAA runner-up. He helped play a major role in growing USA Wrestling and was later a successful high school coach in Deerfield, Illinois. In 1985, he was inducted into the National Wrestling Hall of Fame as a Distinguished Member.
