= 1967 NCAA University Division wrestling championships =

American collegiate wrestling tournament

1967 NCAA University Division Wrestling Championships
Tournament information
- Sport: College wrestling
- Location: Kent, Ohio
- Dates: March 23, 1967–March 25, 1967
- Host(s): Kent State University
- Venue(s): Memorial Gym

Final positions
- Champions: Michigan State (1st title)
- 1st runners-up: Michigan
- 2nd runners-up: Iowa State

Tournament statistics
- Attendance: 31,000
- MVP: Rick Sanders (Portland State)

The 1967 NCAA University Division Wrestling Championships were the 37th NCAA University Division Wrestling Championships to be held. Kent State University in Kent, Ohio hosted the tournament at Memorial Gym.

Michigan State took home the team championship with 74 points and having two individual champions.

Rick Sanders of Portland State was named the Most Outstanding Wrestler and Curley Culp of Arizona State received the Gorriaran Award.

== Team results ==
Rank	School	Points
1	Michigan State	74
2	Michigan	63
3	Iowa State	51
4	Oklahoma	48
5	Portland State	41
6	Oklahoma State	40
7	Lehigh	36
8	Arizona State	27
9	Navy	20
10	Air Force	18

== Individual finals ==
Weight class	Championship match (champion in boldface)
115 lbs	**Rick Sanders**, Portland State MAJOR Jim Anderson, Minnesota, 19–2
123 lbs	**Mike Caruso**, Lehigh DEC Bob Fehrs, Michigan, 7–6
130 lbs	**David McGuire**, Oklahoma DEC Don Behm, Michigan State, 9–6
137 lbs	**Dale Anderson**, Michigan State DEC Masaru Yatabe, Portland State, 6–6, 3–2
145 lbs	**Don Henderson**, Air Force DEC Mike Gluck, Wisconsin, 8–1
152 lbs	**Jim Kamman**, Michigan DEC Wayne Wells, Oklahoma, 6–5
160 lbs	**Vic Marcucci**, Iowa State DEC Cleo McGlory, Oklahoma, 2–1
167 lbs	**George Radman**, Michigan State MAJOR Mike Gallego, Fresno State, 17–8
177 lbs	**Fred Fozzard**, Oklahoma State DEC Mike Bradley, Michigan State, 10–3
191 lbs	**Tom Schlendorf**, Syracuse DEC Don Buzzard, Iowa State, 5–0
UNL	**Curley Culp**, Arizona State WBF Nick Carollo, Adams State, 0:51
