= Sükhbaatar =

Sükhbaatar or Sükhbaataryn may refer to:

== People ==
- Damdin Sükhbaatar (1893–1923), Mongolian military leader and revolutionary hero
- Sükhbaataryn Yanjmaa (1893–1962), Mongolian politician and head of state, widow of Damdin Sükhbaatar
- Sükhbaataryn Batbold (born 1963), Mongolian politician and prime minister
- Sükhbaataryn Sürenjav (born 1951), Mongolian Olympic wrestler
- Bazaryn Sükhbaatar (born 1943), Mongolian wrestler
- Tümendembereliin Sükhbaatar (born 1964), Mongolian wrestler

== Places in Mongolia ==
- Sükhbaatar Province, a province of Mongolia
  - Sükhbaatar, Sükhbaatar, a district
- Sükhbaatar (district), a districts of the Mongolian capital of Ulaanbaatar
- Sükhbaatar (city), capital of Selenge province

== See also ==
- Sükhbaatar inscriptions, 8th century Turkic inscriptions in Mongolia
- Sükhbaatar's Mausoleum, in Ulaanbaatar, Mongolia
- Sükhbaatar Square in Ulaanbaatar
- Mongolian name
