= Yury Shakhmuradov =

Soviet wrestler (born 1942)

Yury Shakhmuradov Юрий Шахмурадов
Personal information
- Full name: Yury Avanesovich Shakhmuradov
- Nationality: Russian
- Born: 27 February 1942 (age 84) Jabrayil, Soviet Union

Sport
- Sport: Amateur wrestling
Medal record
Men's freestyle wrestling
Representing Soviet Union
World Championships
| Gold medal – first place | 1970 Edmonton | 82 kg |
European Championships
| Gold medal – first place | 1966 Karlsruhe | 78 kg |
| Gold medal – first place | 1967 Istanbul | 78 kg |
| Gold medal – first place | 1969 Sofia | 82 kg |

Yury Avanesovich Shakhmuradov (born 27 February 1942 in Jabrayil) is a retired Soviet freestyle wrestler of armenian origin. Senior world champion 1970 and 3x European champion. He competed in the men's freestyle 78 kg at the 1968 Summer Olympics. Also, he was a former head coach of the senior Russian women's national wrestling team (2012-2019).
