= Ángel Aldana =

Guatemalan wrestler

Personal information
- Born: 6 June 1936 Zacapa, Guatemala
- Died: 26 July 2025 (aged 89)

Sport
- Sport: Wrestling

Ángel Aldana (6 June 1936 – 26 July 2025) was a Guatemalan wrestler. He competed in two events at the 1968 Summer Olympics.
