= Nazar Albaryan =

Armenian wrestler (1943–2021)

Personal information
- Nationality: Armenian
- Born: 4 May 1943 Parpi, Armenian SSR, Soviet Union
- Died: 30 March 2021 (aged 77)

Sport
- Sport: Wrestling

Nazar Albaryan (4 May 1943 – 30 March 2021) was an Armenian wrestler. He competed for the Soviet Union in the men's freestyle 52 kg at the 1968 Summer Olympics. His death was announced in March 2021.

== Career ==
Albaryan finished 4th in the Men's Freestyle 52kg category at the 1968 Summer Olympic Games in Mexico City, representing the Soviet Union.
