= Sukha (disambiguation) =

Sukha is a Sanskrit and Pāli word that is often translated as “happiness" or "ease" or "pleasure" or "bliss."

Sukha may also refer to:

- Sukha (musician), stage name of Sukhman Sodhi, Indo-Canadian rapper
- Sukhdev Singh Sukha, Indian assassin
- Sukha Singh, Sikh warrior
- Labh Singh, also known as Sukha Sipahi, former Punjab Police (India) officer
- Surat Sukha, Thai footballer
- Suree Sukha, Thai footballer

== See also ==
- Sukh (disambiguation)
