= Choi Jeong-hyeok =

South Korean wrestler

Personal information
- Nationality: South Korean
- Born: 1940 (age 85–86) Imsil, South Korea

Sport
- Sport: Wrestling

Choi Jeong-hyeok (born 1940) is a South Korean wrestler. He competed in the men's freestyle 63 kg at the 1968 Summer Olympics.
