= Arona Mané =

Senegalese wrestler

Arona Mané (born 1946) is a Senegalese former wrestler who competed in the 1972 Summer Olympics and in the 1976 Summer Olympics.
