= Petros Triantafyllidis (wrestler, born 1971) =

Greek wrestler

Personal information
- Nationality: Greek
- Born: 5 June 1971 (age 55) Thessaloniki, Greece

Sport
- Sport: Wrestling

Petros Triantafyllidis (born 5 June 1971) is a Greek wrestler. He competed in the men's Greco-Roman 74 kg at the 1992 Summer Olympics. His father also competed at the Olympics.
