= Gustavo Ramírez (wrestler) =

Guatemalan wrestler

Personal information
- Born: 15 May 1941 (age 83); San Marcos, Guatemala

Sport
- Sport: Wrestling

Gustavo Ramírez (born 15 May 1941) is a Guatemalan wrestler. He competed in two events at the 1968 Summer Olympics.
