= Javier Raxón =

Guatemalan wrestler

Personal information
- Nationality: Guatemalan
- Born: 3 December 1944 (age 80)

Sport
- Sport: Wrestling

Javier Raxón (born 3 December 1944) is a Guatemalan wrestler. He competed in two events at the 1968 Summer Olympics.
