= Evaristo Oliva =

Guatemalan cyclist

Personal information
- Born: 25 October 1945 Parada, Guatemala
- Died: 6 October 2025 (aged 79)

Cycling career
- Sport: Cycling

Evaristo Oliva (25 October 1945 – 6 October 2025) was a Guatemalan cyclist. He competed in the individual road race and the team time trial events at the 1968 Summer Olympics.
