= André Chardonnens =

Swiss wrestler (born 1945)

André Chardonnens (born 2 June 1945) is a Swiss former wrestler who competed in the 1972 Summer Olympics.
