= Heinz-Helmut Wehling =

East German wrestler (born 1950)

Medal record

Men's Greco-Roman wrestling

Representing East Germany

Olympic Games
Silver medal – second place	1972 Munich	featherweight
Bronze medal – third place	1976 Montreal	lightweight

Heinz-Helmut Wehling (born 8 September 1950 in Bad Frankenhausen) is a German former wrestler who competed in the 1972 Summer Olympics and in the 1976 Summer Olympics.
