= José Defran =

Dominican Republic wrestler

Personal information
- Nationality: Dominican
- Born: 1 January 1938 (age 88) Concepción de la Vega, Dominican Republic

Sport
- Sport: Wrestling

José Defran (born 1 January 1938) is a Dominican Republic wrestler. He competed in the men's freestyle 52 kg at the 1968 Summer Olympics.
