= Francisco Cuque =

Guatemalan cyclist

Personal information
- Born: 10 October 1942 (age 84) El Porvenir, Guatemala

Cycling career
- Sport: Cycling

Francisco Cuque (born 10 October 1942) is a former Guatemalan cyclist. He competed in the individual road race and the team time trial events at the 1968 Summer Olympics.
