= Jakob Tanner =

Swiss wrestler

Jakob Tanner (18 December 1946 – 9 July 2020) was a Swiss wrestler who competed in the 1972 Summer Olympics.
