= Tadeusz Godyń =

Polish wrestler

Personal information
- Nationality: Polish
- Born: 14 July 1944 (age 80); Dąbrowa Górnicza, Poland

Sport
- Sport: Wrestling

Tadeusz Godyń (born 14 July 1944) is a Polish wrestler. He competed in two events at the 1968 Summer Olympics.
