= Mostafa Momeni =

Mostafa Momeni مصطفی مؤمنی
- Born: Mostafa Momeni Ab Kharaki; 1940; Tehran, Iran
- Died: 2017 (aged 76–77); Tehran, Iran
- Occupations: Geographer; scholar

Mostafa Momeni (Persian: مصطفی مومنی; 1940 – March 4, 2017) was an Iranian geographer and professor at Shahid Beheshti University.

== Education and career ==
Momeni was a doctoral student at the University of Marburg (1976).

He was selected for the 18th edition of the Book of the Year in Iran for writing the book Database of Geography in Iran: Database of Urban Geography in Iran. In addition to numerous research projects, more than 30 scientific articles in various fields of geography have been published and published in prestigious domestic and foreign journals. Mostafa Momeni's research has been done in the fields of urban geography, worldview, cultural geography, especially the effects of religion and ideology on the living space.

== Works ==
- Tehran: Geography, History, Culture, Seyed Hossein Nasr, Ali Ashraf Sadeghi, Mostafa Momeni and Farzaneh Sasanpour, Tehran: Reference Book
- Geography Database in Iran: Urban Geography Database in Iran, Mostafa Momeni, Tehran: Academy of Sciences of the Islamic Republic of Iran, 2000
- Jahan-e-Islam, Mostafa Momeni, Tehran: Reference book
- Tabriz: Geography, History, Mostafa Momeni, Tehran: Reference book
- Geography (pre-university course in humanities), authors group, Tehran: school
