= César Solari =

Ecuadorian wrestler

Personal information
- Born: 2 November 1946 Guayaquil, Ecuador
- Died: 25 February 2007 (aged 60)

Sport
- Sport: Wrestling

César Solari (2 November 1946 – 25 February 2007) was an Ecuadorian wrestler. He competed in the men's freestyle 52 kg at the 1968 Summer Olympics.
