= Hossein Moarreb =

Iranian wrestler

Seyed Hossein Moarreb
Personal information
- Nationality: Iranian
- Born: 23 August 1947 (age 78) Mashhad, Iran

Sport
- Sport: Wrestling

Seyed Hossein Moarreb (Persian: سید حسین معرب, born 23 August 1947) is an Iranian wrestler. He competed in the men's Greco-Roman 63 kg at the 1968 Summer Olympics.
