= Dimitar Galinchev =

Bulgarian wrestler

Personal information
- Nationality: Bulgarian
- Born: 15 September 1938
- Died: 7 December 2020 (aged 82) Plovdiv, Bulgaria

Sport
- Sport: Wrestling

Dimitar Galinchev (15 September 1938 – 7 December 2020) was a Bulgarian wrestler. He competed in the men's Greco-Roman 63 kg at the 1968 Summer Olympics.
