= Shigeo Nakata =

Japanese freestyle wrestler

Medal record

Men's freestyle wrestling

Representing Japan

Olympic Games
| Gold medal – first place | 1968 Mexico City | 52 kg |

World Championships
| Gold medal – first place | 1967 Bucharest | 52 kg |

Asian Games
| Gold medal – first place | 1966 Bangkok | 52 kg |

Shigeo Nakata (中田 茂男, Nakata Shigeo; born 16 October 1945 in Asahikawa, Hokkaidō) is a Japanese wrestler and Olympic champion in Freestyle wrestling. He also won a gold medal at the 1967 World Wrestling Championships and at the 1966 Asian Games.

== Olympics ==
Nakata competed at the 1968 Summer Olympics in Mexico City where he received a gold medal in Freestyle wrestling, the flyweight class.
