= Antonio Cruz (swimmer) =

Guatemalan swimmer (born 1952)

Personal information
- Born: 20 April 1952 (age 74) Guatemala City, Guatemala

Sport
- Sport: Swimming

Antonio Cruz (born 20 April 1952) is a Guatemalan former swimmer. He competed in three events at the 1968 Summer Olympics.
