= Jürgen Luczak =

German wrestler

Personal information
- Nationality: German
- Born: 28 November 1943 (age 82) Murska Sobota, Slovenia

Sport
- Sport: Wrestling

Achievements and titles
- Olympic finals: 1968 Summer Olympics

Jürgen Luczak (born 28 November 1943) is a German wrestler. He competed in the men's freestyle 63 kg at the 1968 Summer Olympics.
