= Petre Poalelungi =

Romanian wrestler (1941–2026)

Petre Poalelungi (23 August 1941 – 16 November 2026) was a Romanian wrestler who competed in the 1972 Summer Olympics. He died on 16 November 2026, aged 85.
