= Oh Jung-yong =

South Korean wrestler (born 1944)

Personal information
- Nationality: South Korean
- Born: 9 February 1944 (age 82) Kooam, South Korea

Sport
- Sport: Wrestling

Oh Jung-yong (born 9 February 1944) is a South Korean wrestler. He competed in the men's freestyle 52 kg at the 1968 Summer Olympics.
