= Yehya Mohamed Hassanein =

Egyptian wrestler

Personal information
- Nationality: Egyptian
- Born: October 24, 1949 (age 76) Cairo, Egypt

Sport
- Sport: Wrestling

Yehya Mohamed Hassanein born 24 October 1949 is an Egyptian wrestler. He competed in the men's Greco-Roman 63 kg at the 1968 Summer Olympics.
