= Juan de Hernández =

Guatemalan wrestler (born 1947)

Juan de Hernández (born 27 December 1947) is a Guatemalan former wrestler who competed in the 1972 Summer Olympics.
