= Kikuo Wada =

Japanese wrestler (1951–2025)

Medal record

Men's freestyle wrestling

Representing Japan

Olympic Games
Silver medal – second place	1972 Munich	68 kg

Kikuo Wada (和田 喜久夫, Wada Kikuo; 1 March 1951 – 8 May 2025) was a Japanese wrestler who competed in the 1972 Summer Olympics. He died on 8 May 2025, at the age of 74.
