= Kayum Ayub =

Afghan wrestler (born 1947)

Kayum Ayub (born 21 June 1947 in Kabul) is a former wrestler from Afghanistan, who competed at the 1968 Summer Olympics in the welterweight freestyle event.
