= Ali Şahin (wrestler) =

Turkish wrestler

Ali Şahin (born 20 May 1944) is a Turkish former wrestler who competed in the 1972 Summer Olympics.
