= Georges Carbasse =

French wrestler (born 1944)

Georges Carbasse (born 29 September 1944) is a French former wrestler who competed in the 1972 Summer Olympics.
