= Carlos Romero (wrestler, born 1942) =

Mexican wrestler

Personal information
- Born: 6 July 1942 (age 84) Campeche, Mexico

Sport
- Sport: Wrestling

Carlos Romero (born 6 July 1942) is a Mexican wrestler. He competed in the men's freestyle 78 kg at the 1968 Summer Olympics.
