= Ramiro Benavides (swimmer) =

Guatemalan swimmer (born 1954)

Personal information
- Born: 3 January 1954 (age 72) Guatemala City, Guatemala

Sport
- Sport: Swimming

Ramiro Benavides (born 3 January 1954) is a Guatemalan former swimmer. He competed in three events at the 1968 Summer Olympics.
