= Simion Popescu =

Romanian Greco-Roman wrestler

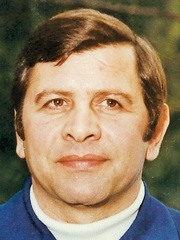

Personal information
- Born: 11 August 1940 (age 85) Cuptoare, Romania
- Height: 170 cm (5 ft 7 in)

Sport
- Sport: Greco-Roman wrestling
- Club: CSA Steaua București
Medal record
Representing Romania
Olympic Games
Bronze medal – third place	1968 Mexico City	-63 kg
World Championships
Silver medal – second place	1967 Bucharest	-63 kg
Gold medal – first place	1969 Mar del Plata	-68 kg
Silver medal – second place	1970 Edmonton	-68 kg
European Championships
Bronze medal – third place	1966 Essen	-63 kg
Gold medal – first place	1967 Minsk	-63 kg

Simion Popescu (born 11 August 1940) is a retired Greco-Roman wrestler from Romania. He competed at the 1968 and 1972 Olympics and won a bronze medal in 1968. At the world championships he won a gold medal in 1969, placing second in 1967 and 1970. After retiring from competitions he worked as a wrestling coach at the club Rapid Bucuresti.
