= Ronald Ouellet =

Canadian wrestler

Ronald Ouellet (born 28 November 1946) is a Canadian former wrestler who competed in the 1972 Summer Olympics. He wrestled in college for Michigan State University.
