= Udo Schröder =

German wrestler

Udo Schröder (born 12 February 1950 in Herne) is a German former wrestler who competed in the 1972 Summer Olympics.
