= László Nyers =

Hungarian wrestler

Personal information
- Nationality: Hungarian
- Born: 14 April 1934 Nemesdéd, Hungary
- Died: 22 January 2013 (aged 78)

Sport
- Sport: Wrestling

László Nyers (14 April 1934 – 22 January 2013) was a Hungarian wrestler. He competed in the men's freestyle +97 kg at the 1968 Summer Olympics.
