= Ali Mohammad Momeni =

Iranian wrestler

Personal information
- Nationality: Iranian
- Born: 22 January 1937 (age 89) Gorgan, Iran

Sport
- Sport: Wrestling

Ali Mohammad Momeni (born 22 January 1937) is an Iranian wrestler. He competed in the men's freestyle 78 kg at the 1968 Summer Olympics.
