= José Luis García (wrestler) =

Guatemalan wrestler

Personal information
- Born: Senahú, Guatemala

Sport
- Sport: Wrestling

José Luis García is a Guatemalan wrestler. He competed in two events at the 1968 Summer Olympics.
