= Wanelge Castillo =

Panamanian wrestler (1945–2025)

Wanelge Castillo (9 March 1945 – 30 January 2025) is a Panamanian former wrestler who competed in the 1968 Summer Olympics and in the 1972 Summer Olympics. At the 1967 Pan American Games he finished second in the 52.0 kg. freestyle category. At the 1971 Pan American Games he finished third in the 52.0 kg. freestyle category.

Castillo died on 30 January 2025, at the age of 79.
