= Juan Pablo Romero (footballer) =

Argentine footballer

Personal information
- Date of birth: 2 June 1998 (age 28)
- Place of birth: Elortondo, Argentina
- Height: 1.81 m (5 ft 11 in)
- Position: Goalkeeper

Youth career
- CA Elortondo
- 2013–2020: Rosario Central

Senior career*
Years	Team	Apps	(Gls)
2020–2023	Rosario Central	11	(0)
2023	→ Güemes (loan)	20	(0)
- * Club domestic league appearances and goals as of 16 October 2023

Juan Pablo Romero (born 2 June 1998) is an Argentine professional footballer who plays as a goalkeeper.

== Career ==
Romero joined the Rosario Central academy from Club Atlético Elortondo at the end of 2013; after Rosario coach Hugo Gottardi obtained him a trial. Romero was promoted into Kily González's first-team squad at the end of 2020, with his senior debut arriving - as a starter - on 4 December 2020 in a Copa de la Liga Profesional score draw away to Banfield; he had been an unused substitute three times in the preceding November.

== Career statistics ==
As of 5 December 2020.

Appearances and goals by club, season and competition
Club	Season	League			Cup		League Cup		Continental		Other		Total	
Club	Season	Division	Apps	Goals	Apps	Goals	Apps	Goals	Apps	Goals	Apps	Goals	Apps	Goals
Rosario Central	2020–21 (Note: Soccerway counts Copa de la Liga Profesional appearances as league appearances.)	Primera División	1	0	0	0	0	0	—		0	0	1	0
Career total			1	0	0	0	0	0	—		0	0	1	0
