= Petros Triantafyllidis (wrestler, born 1947) =

Greek wrestler

Personal information
- Nationality: Greek
- Born: 1947 (age 78–79) Bad Berleburg, Germany

Sport
- Sport: Wrestling

Petros Triantafyllidis (born 1947) is a Greek wrestler. He competed in the men's freestyle 52 kg at the 1968 Summer Olympics. His son also competed at the Olympics.
