= Shamseddin Seyed-Abbasi =

Iranian wrestler (1943–2004)

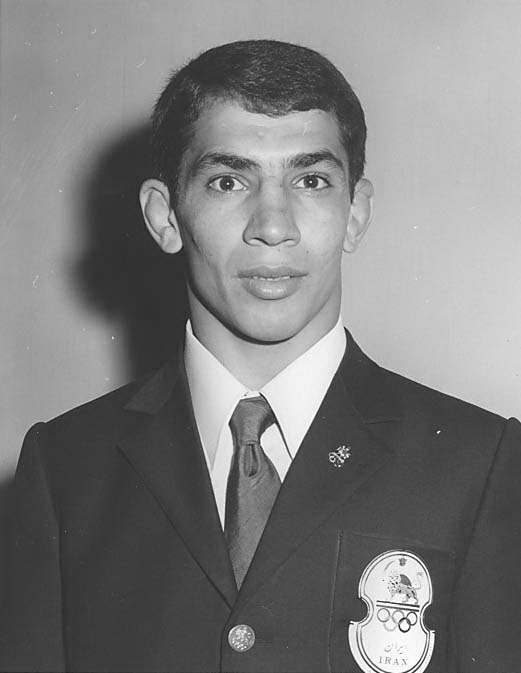
Medal record
Representing Iran
Men's freestyle wrestling
Olympic Games
Bronze medal – third place	1968 Mexico	63 kg
World Championships
Gold medal – first place	1970 Edmonton	62 kg
Silver medal – second place	1969 Mar del Plata	62 kg
Silver medal – second place	1971 Sofia	62 kg
Asian Games
Gold medal – first place	1970 Bangkok	62 kg

Seyed Shamseddin Seyed-Abbasi (Persian: سید شمس الدین سیدعباسی, February 5, 1943, Tehran – March 16, 2004, Tehran) was an Iranian wrestler who won a bronze medal in freestyle at the 1968 Summer Olympics.

Seyed-Abbasi died at 3 o'clock on the afternoon of 16 March 2004 (26 Esfand 1382 AH) in Iranmehr Hospital in Gholhak, Tehran from cancer. fitilepich
