= Eduardo Quintero (wrestler) =

Cuban wrestler (born 1950)

Eduardo Quintero (born 28 November 1950) is a Cuban former wrestler who competed in the 1972 Summer Olympics.
