= Chimedbazaryn Damdinsharav =

Mongolian wrestler (born 1945)

Medal record

Men's freestyle wrestling

Representing Mongolia

Olympic Games
| Bronze medal – third place | 1968 Mexico | Flyweight |

Chimedbazaryn Damdinsharav (Mongolian: Чимэдбазарын Дамдиншарав; born March 21, 1945) is a retired Mongolian wrestler.

At the 1968 Summer Olympics Damdinsharav won the bronze medal in the men's Freestyle Flyweight category. (Note: The IOC database incorrectly assigns this medal to Sükhbaataryn Sürenjav.) He is also first Mongolian Olympic medalist.

== Awards ==
- People's Teacher (Mongolian: Ардын Багш) of Mongolia
