= Ismail Yuseinov =

Bulgarian wrestler (born 1948)

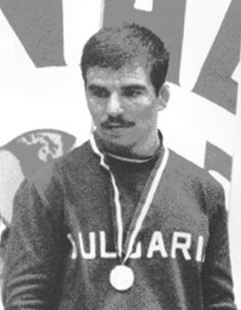
- Yuseinov at the 1970 World Championships

Personal information
- Born: 10 February 1948 (age 78) Stremtsi, Bulgaria
- Height: 166 cm (5 ft 5 in)

Sport
- Sport: Freestyle Wrestling
Medal record
Representing Bulgaria
World Championships
| Silver medal – second place | 1970 Edmonton | -68 kg |
| Bronze medal – third place | 1971 Sofia | -68 kg |
| Bronze medal – third place | 1975 Minsk | -68 kg |
European Wrestling Championships
| Gold medal – first place | 1970 Berlin | -68 kg |
| Gold medal – first place | 1972 Katowice | -68 kg |
| Silver medal – second place | 1976 Leningrad | -68 kg |

Ismail Vasilev Yuseinov (Bulgarian: Исмаил Василев Юсеинов, born 10 February 1948) is a retired Bulgarian lightweight freestyle wrestler who competed at the 1972 Summer Olympics. Between 1970 and 1976 he won six medals at the world and European championships, becoming the lightweight European champion in 1970 and 1972.
