= Nikolaos Karypidis =

Greek wrestler

Personal information
- Nationality: Greek
- Born: 28 July 1947 (age 78) Anagennisi, Serres

Sport
- Sport: Wrestling

Nikolaos Karypidis (born 1947) is a Greek wrestler. He competed in the men's freestyle 63 kg at the 1968 Summer Olympics.
