= Mahmut Atalay =

Turkish wrestler (1934–2004)

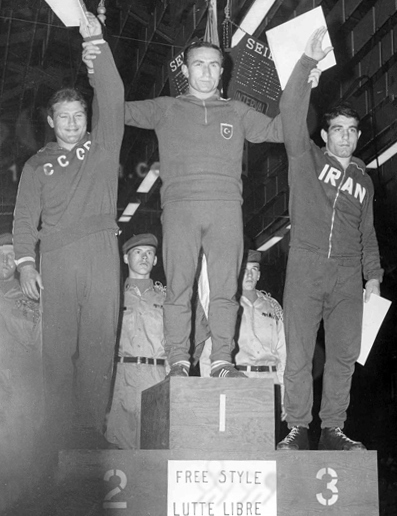
- Atalay (center) at the 1966 World Championships

Personal information
- Born: 30 March 1934 Çorum, Turkey
- Died: 4 December 2004 (aged 70) Ankara, Turkey
- Height: 171 cm (5 ft 7 in)

Sport
- Sport: Freestyle wrestling
Medal record
Men's freestyle wrestling
Representing Turkey
Olympic Games
Gold medal – first place	1968 Mexico City	78 kg
World Championships
Gold medal – first place	1966 Toledo	78 kg
Silver medal – second place	1965 Manchester	70 kg
European Championships
Silver medal – second place	1966 Karlsruhe	78 kg
Silver medal – second place	1967 Istanbul	78 kg
Mediterranean Games
Gold medal – first place	1959 Beirut	78 kg
Gold medal – first place	1963 Naples	70 kg
Balkan Championships
Gold medal – first place	1962 Istanbul	78 kg
Gold medal – first place	1965 Yambol	78 kg

Mahmut Atalay (30 March 1934 – 4 December 2004) was a Turkish freestyle wrestler and coach. He competed at the 1964 and 1968 Olympics and won a gold medal in 1968, placing fourth in 1964.

== Early life and wrestling career ==
He was born in 1934 in Çorak, a village of Çorum Province in northern Turkey. He began wrestling in the traditional Turkish karakucak style before changing to freestyle wrestling. It was not until the age of 18 that he began Olympic wrestling in 1952. It took him a relatively long time to grow into the Turkish top class of freestyle wrestlers. It was not until the late 1950s, at the age of 25, that he was selected for the Turkish national wrestling team. He was admitted to the national team after winning the national title in 1959, and received training by the renowned wrestlers such as Yaşar Doğu, Celal Atik and Nasuh Akar and Halit Balamir.

After the 1960 Olympic champion İsmail Ogan, who wrestled in Mahmut's weight class, ended his active career, the way was clear for him to compete in the international championships. From 1961, he competed for Turkey in many championships until 1968. However, it took until 1965 before he could win an international medal. Since Turkish wrestlers are among the strongest in the world in the freestyle along with the Soviet athletes and the U.S., it is surprising that Mahmut Atalay was given so many chances by the Turkish wrestling federation. In the end, he justified this trust when he became world champion in 1966 and Olympic champion in 1968. He achieved remarkable victories over the world-class wrestlers Abdollah Movahed, Iran, Guliko Sagaradze and Sarbeg Beriashvili, both USSR and Enju Valchev Dimov, Bulgaria.

== Awards and achievements ==
He became the national champion 15 times, and besides his Olympic gold won several medals at other international competitions. In 1968, he was honored by the International Wrestling Federation with the award "Most Technical Wrestler of the World".

== Later life and death ==
He retired from competitions in 1968 and then worked as a national wrestling coach for 16 years. Atalay died on 4 December 2004 in Ankara following a heart attack.
