= Enyu Todorov =

Bulgarian freestyle wrestler (1943–2022)

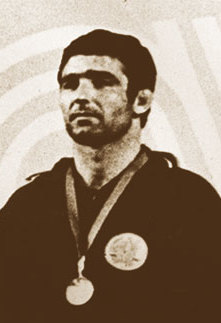
- Todorov at the 1968 Olympics

Personal information
- Born: 22 February 1943 Aprilovo, Stara Zagora, Bulgaria
- Died: 26 May 2022 (aged 79) Sofia, Bulgaria
- Height: 1.66 m (5 ft 5 in)

Sport
- Sport: Freestyle wrestling
- Club: CSKA Sofia; Levski Sofia
Medal record
Representing Bulgaria
Olympic Games
Silver medal – second place	1968 Mexico City	-63 kg
European Championships
Silver medal – second place	1966 Karlsruhe	-62 kg
Gold medal – first place	1969 Sofia	-62 kg
Gold medal – first place	1970 Berlin	-62 kg

Enyu Dinev Todorov (Bulgarian: Еню Динев Тодоров; 22 February 1943 – 26 May 2022) was a Bulgarian featherweight freestyle wrestler. He won a silver medal at the 1968 Summer Olympic Games in Mexico City, and the European title in 1969 in Sofia and in 1970 in Berlin.
