= Rick Sanders (wrestler) =

American wrestler (1945–1972)

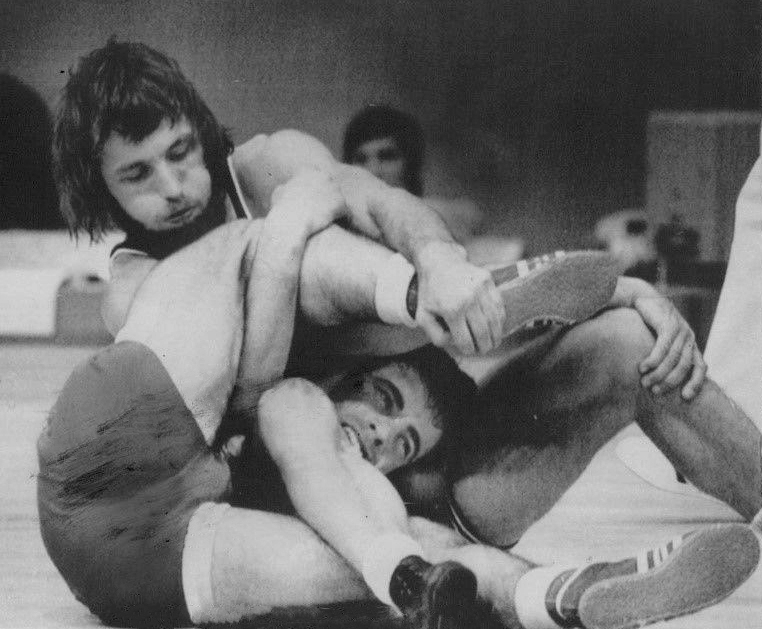
- Sanders (top) at the 1972 Olympics

Personal information
- Born: January 20, 1945 Lakeview, Oregon, U.S.
- Died: October 18, 1972 (aged 27) Skopje, Yugoslavia

Sport
- Country: United States
- Sport: Wrestling
- Events: Freestyle and Folkstyle
- College team: Portland State
- Club: Multnomah Athletic Club
- Team: USA
Medal record
Men's freestyle wrestling
Representing the United States
Olympic Games
| Silver medal – second place | 1968 Mexico City | 52 kg |
| Silver medal – second place | 1972 Munich | 57 kg |
World Championships
| Gold medal – first place | 1969 Mar del Plata | 52 kg |
| Silver medal – second place | 1967 New Delhi | 52 kg |
| Bronze medal – third place | 1966 Toledo | 52 kg |
Pan American Games
| Gold medal – first place | 1967 Winnipeg | 57 kg |
Men's collegiate wrestling
Representing Portland State
NAIA Championships
| Gold medal – first place | 1965 Terre Haute | 115 lb |
NCAA Division I Championships
| Gold medal – first place | 1966 Ames | 115 lb |
| Gold medal – first place | 1967 Kent | 115 lb |
| Silver medal – second place | 1968 State College | 123 lb |
NCAA Division II Championships
| Gold medal – first place | 1967 Wilkes-Barre | 115 lb |
| Gold medal – first place | 1968 Mankato | 123 lb |
| Bronze medal – third place | 1966 Mankato | 123 lb |

Richard Joseph "Rick" Sanders (January 20, 1945 – October 18, 1972) was an American folkstyle and freestyle wrestler. He won gold medals at the 1967 Pan American Games and 1969 World Championships, finishing second at the 1968 and 1972 Olympics and 1967 World Championships. After the 1972 Olympics, while traveling to Greece, he was killed in a car accident in Skopje, Yugoslavia. In 1987, Sanders was inducted into the National Wrestling Hall of Fame as a Distinguished Member.

== Wrestling ==
=== High school ===
Rick Sanders attended Lincoln High School in Portland, Oregon. While there he wrestled at 98 pounds in 1961, 108 pounds in 1962 and 115 pounds in 1963. He won three Oregon State Championships, finishing with a high school record of 80–1.

=== University ===
When Sanders arrived at Portland State University, he quickly led his team to national prominence. As a freshman, he highlighted an undefeated season by winning the 1965 NAIA National Championships at 115 pounds and earned the Outstanding Wrestler Award. As a sophomore Sanders lost the first match of his career when he moved up to the 123 pound class and placed third in the NCAA College Division Nationals. Two weeks later he dropped down to the 115 pound class and won the 1966 NCAA University Division National Championship. As a junior Sanders had a perfect season going undefeated and winning both the 1967 NCAA College and University Division National Championships at 115 pounds. He was selected as the Outstanding Wrestler in both meets. As a senior Sanders moved up to the 123 pound class and went undefeated during the regular season. He won his second NCAA College Division National Championship and was again selected as the Outstanding Wrestler. Two weeks later at the NCAA University Division Nationals, Sanders lost for only the second time in his collegiate career when he placed second. His total collegiate record was 103–2. He led his Portland State team to a first-place finish in the 1967 NCAA College Division Nationals, a second-place finish in 1968, and a third-place finish in 1967. The same three years Portland State also finished fifth, sixth, and eighth in the NCAA University Division Nationals. Sanders is the only collegiate wrestler to win National Championships in the NAIA, NCAA College Division, and the NCAA University Division, and be designated an Outstanding Wrestler in each.

=== U.S. Team and Olympics ===
As early as his freshman year in college, in 1965, Sanders won his first of five national freestyle championships and made the U.S. World Team. In 1966 he placed third in the World Championships, in 1967 he placed second in the World, and won the Pan American Games. In 1968, Sanders won an Olympic silver medal. A year later in 1969, at 114.5 pounds, Sanders won a World Championship, alongside another American who won a World Championship that same year, Fred Fozzard. He returned to the Olympics in 1972 and captured another silver medal. Of the eleven bouts he won in two Olympics, nine came by fall.

== Death ==
Following the Olympic Games in Munich, Sanders began touring Europe. While hitch-hiking to Greece, he was killed in an automobile accident on October 18, 1972, in Skopje, Yugoslavia when the Land Rover he was riding in crashed head-on into a bus.

Sanders is buried in Forrester Cemetery in Eagle Creek, Oregon.
