= Safer Sali =

Yugoslav freestyle wrestler (born 1946)

Personal information
- Born: June 3, 1946 Veles, PR Macedonia, FPR Yugoslavia
Medal record
Men's Freestyle Wrestling
Representing Yugoslavia
European Championships
Bronze medal – third place	1970 Berlin	68 kg
Bronze medal – third place	1972 Katowice	68 kg
Balkan Games
Gold medal – first place	1968 Constanta	70 kg
Mediterranean Games
Silver medal – second place	1971 Izmir	70 kg

Safer Sali (Albanian: Safer Sali, Macedonian: Сафер Сали, romanized: Safer Sali; born 3 June 1946, in Veles, FPR Yugoslavia) is a former freestyle wrestler who competed in the 1972 Summer Olympics for Yugoslavia. He is of Albanian heritage.
