= Włodzimierz Cieślak =

Polish wrestler

Włodzimierz Cieślak (born 23 April 1950, in Zgierz) is a Polish former wrestler who competed in the 1972 Summer Olympics.
