= Masaaki Kaneko =

Japanese freestyle wrestler

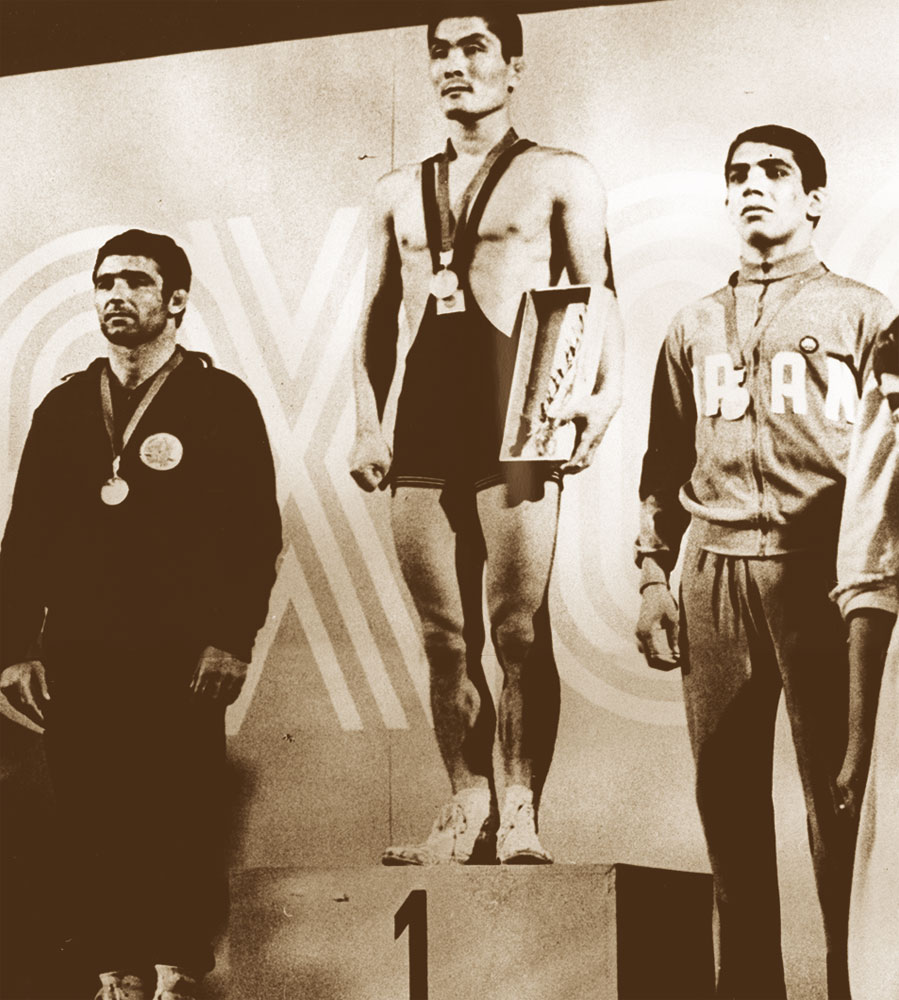
- Kaneko (center) at the 1968 Olympics

Personal information
- Born: July 8, 1940 (age 86) Tochigi Prefecture, Japan
- Height: 171 cm (5 ft 7 in)

Sport
- Sport: Freestyle wrestling
Medal record
Representing Japan
Olympic Games
Gold medal – first place	1968 Mexico City	63 kg
Asian Games
Gold medal – first place	1966 Bangkok	63 kg
World Championships
Gold medal – first place	1966 Toledo	63 kg
Gold medal – first place	1967 New Delhi	63 kg

Masaaki Kaneko (金子正明, Kaneko Masaaki; born July 8, 1940) is a retired Japanese featherweight freestyle wrestler. Between 1966 and 1968 he won all major titles, including gold medals at two world championships, and at the 1966 Asian and 1968 Olympic Games. He was inducted in the Wrestling Hall of Fame in 2007.

== Life and career ==
Kaneko was born in Ashikaga, Tochigi and started wrestling in high school. After graduating from Senshu University he joined the Japan Self-Defense Forces. He lost against Yojiro Uetake for the qualification to the 1964 Summer Olympics in bantamweight. He started weight training and changed weight classes to featherweight, eventually winning two world championships and the 1968 Summer Olympics. He was considered to be an "unusual" gold medalist, being 28 years old at the time, married, with a child. After retirement, he worked at the self-defense forces, and later became a secretary, and then a security director at Fuji Television.
