= Angel Sotirov =

Bulgarian wrestler

Personal information
- Nationality: Bulgarian
- Born: 16 October 1943 Burgas, Bulgaria
- Died: 4 December 2017 (aged 74)

Sport
- Sport: Wrestling

Angel Sotirov (16 October 1943 – 4 December 2017) was a Bulgarian wrestler. He competed in the men's freestyle 78 kg at the 1968 Summer Olympics.
