= Hideo Fujimoto (wrestler) =

Greco-Roman wrestler from Japan

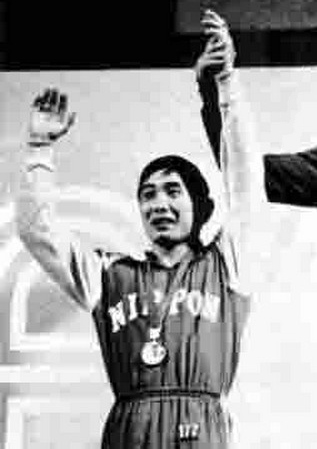
- Fujimoto at the 1968 Olympics

Personal information
- Born: June 24, 1944 (age 82) Tokushima Prefecture, Japan
- Height: 167 cm (5 ft 6 in)

Sport
- Sport: Greco-Roman wrestling
Medal record
Representing Japan
Olympic Games
Silver medal – second place	1968 Mexico City	-63 kg
World Championships
Bronze medal – third place	1967 Bucharest	-63 kg
Gold medal – first place	1970 Edmonton	-62 kg
Bronze medal – third place	1971 Sofia	-62 kg

Hideo Fujimoto (藤本 英男, born June 24, 1944) is a retired Greco-Roman wrestler from Japan. He competed at the 1968 and 1972 Olympics and won a silver medal in 1968, placing fourth in 1972. At the world championships he won a gold medal in 1970 and bronze medals in 1967 and 1971.
