= Sükhbaataryn Sürenjav =

Mongolian wrestler (born 1951)

Sükhbaataryn Sürenjav (Mongolian: Сүхбаатарын Сүрэнжав; born May 20, 1951) is a retired Mongolian wrestler.

The IOC database incorrectly lists Sürenjav as bronze medalist in the Freestyle wrestling Flyweight category at the 1968 Summer Olympics in Mexico. In reality, that medal was taken home by fellow Mongolian wrestler Chimedbazaryn Damdinsharav.
