= Martti Laakso =

Finnish wrestler

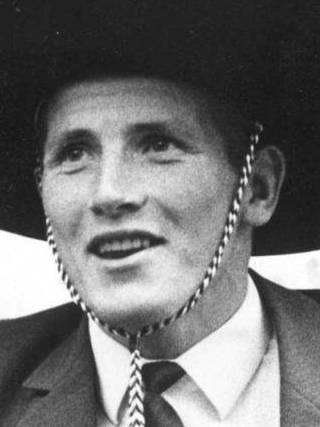
Martti Laakso wearing a sombrero after returning from Mexico pre-Olympic games in 1968

Martti Einari Laakso (born 19 December 1943 in Ilmajoki) is a Finnish former wrestler who competed in the 1968 Summer Olympics and the 1972 Summer Olympics. His elder brother was the Finnish wrestler, Matti Laakso.
