= Gabriel Ruz =

Mexican wrestler

Gabriel Ruz (born 8 September 1950) is a Mexican former wrestler who competed in the 1968 Summer Olympics and in the 1972 Summer Olympics.
