= Elkan Tedeev =

Soviet wrestler

Yelkan Tedeyev
Personal information
- Nationality: Soviet
- Born: 29 December 1938 Oktyabrskoye, Soviet Union
- Died: 3 October 1984 (aged 45) Moscow, Soviet Union
- Weight: 63 kg (139 lb)

Sport
- Sport: Freestyle wrestling
Medal record
Representing the Soviet Union
European Championships
Gold medal – first place	1966 Karlsruhe	63 kg
USSR Championships
Gold medal – first place	1967 Moscow	63 kg
Gold medal – first place	1963 Moscow	63 kg
Gold medal – first place	1962 Orzhonikidze	63 kg

Elkan Tedeev (29 December 1938 – 3 October 1984) was a Soviet wrestler. He competed in the men's freestyle 63 kg at the 1968 Summer Olympics. He won a European title in 1966. Tedeev won his first USSR title in 1962, with the draw against reigning World Champion Ali Aliev.
