= Metin Alakoç =

Turkish wrestler

Metin Alakoç (born 26 May 1942) is a Turkish former wrestler, born in Ankara, who competed in the 1968 Summer Olympics and in the 1972 Summer Olympics.
