= József Rusznyák =

Hungarian wrestler (1947–2026)

József Rusznyák (6 January 1947 – 1 September 2026) was a Hungarian wrestler who competed in the 1968 Summer Olympics and in the 1972 Summer Olympics.

Born in Végardó on 6 January 1947, Rusznyák died on 1 September 2026, at the age of 79.
