= Mongolia at the 1968 Summer Olympics =

- IOC code: MGL
- NOC: Mongolian National Olympic Committee

in Mexico City
- Competitors: 16 (12 men and 4 women) in 4 sports
- Flag bearer: Khorloogiin Bayanmönkh
- Medals Ranked 34th: Gold 0 Silver 1 Bronze 3 Total 4

Summer Olympics appearances (overview)
- 1964; 1968; 1972; 1976; 1980; 1984; 1988; 1992; 1996; 2000; 2004; 2008; 2012; 2016; 2020; 2024

Mongolia competed at the 1968 Summer Olympics in Mexico City, Mexico. 16 competitors, 12 men and 4 women, took part in 26 events in 4 sports.

== Medalists ==
=== Silver ===
- Jigjidiin Mönkhbat — Wrestling, Men's freestyle middleweight

=== Bronze ===
- Chimedbazaryn Damdinsharav (Note: In place of Tömöriin Artag and Chimedbazaryn Damdinsharav the IOC database incorrectly lists Püreviin Dagvasüren and Sükhbaataryn Sürenjav as medalists.) - Wrestling, Men's freestyle flyweight
- Danzandarjaagiin Sereeter - Wrestling, Men's freestyle lightweight
- Tömöriin Artag - Wrestling, Men's freestyle welterweight

== Gymnastics ==
Four gymnasts, one man and three women, represented Mongolia in 1968.

=== Men ===
Event	Athlete	Result
Individual all-around	Zagdbazaryn Davaanyam (Note: also competed at the 1964 Summer Olympics)	tba
Floor exercise	Zagdbazaryn Davaanyam	tba
Horizontal bar	Zagdbazaryn Davaanyam	tba
Parallel bars	Zagdbazaryn Davaanyam	tba
Pommel horse	Zagdbazaryn Davaanyam	tba
Rings	Zagdbazaryn Davaanyam	tba
Vault	Zagdbazaryn Davaanyam	tba

=== Women ===
Event	Athlete	Results TG	Results YT	Results DN
Individual all-around	Tsagaandorjiin Gündegmaa; Yadamsürengiin Tuyaa; Dorjiin Norolkhoo	tba	tba	tba
Balance beam	Tsagaandorjiin Gündegmaa; Yadamsürengiin Tuyaa; Dorjiin Norolkhoo	tba	tba	tba
Horizontal bar	Tsagaandorjiin Gündegmaa; Yadamsürengiin Tuyaa; Dorjiin Norolkhoo	tba	tba	tba
Uneven bars	Tsagaandorjiin Gündegmaa; Yadamsürengiin Tuyaa; Dorjiin Norolkhoo	tba	tba	tba
Vault	Tsagaandorjiin Gündegmaa; Yadamsürengiin Tuyaa; Dorjiin Norolkhoo	tba	tba	tba

== Shooting ==
Three shooters, all men, represented Mongolia in 1968.

25 m pistol

- Tüdeviin Myagmarjav

50 m pistol

- Tüdeviin Myagmarjav

300 m rifle, three positions

- Yondonjamtsyn Batsükh

50 m rifle, three positions

- Mendbayaryn Jantsankhorloo
- Yondonjamtsyn Batsükh

50 m rifle, prone

- Yondonjamtsyn Batsükh
- Mendbayaryn Jantsankhorloo
