= Wrestling at the 1968 Summer Olympics =

Wrestling at the Games of the XIX Olympiad
- Venue: Insurgentes Ice Rink
- Dates: 16–26 October
- Competitors: 297 from 46 nations

At the 1968 Summer Olympics, 16 wrestling events were contested, for all men. There were eight weight classes in Greco-Roman wrestling and eight classes in freestyle wrestling.

== Medal summary ==
=== Freestyle ===
Games	Gold	Silver	Bronze
52 kg	Shigeo Nakata; Japan	Richard Sanders; United States	Chimedbazaryn Damdinsharav; Mongolia
57 kg	Yojiro Uetake; Japan	Donald Behm; United States	Aboutaleb Talebi; Iran
63 kg	Masaaki Kaneko; Japan	Enyu Todorov; Bulgaria	Shamseddin Seyed-Abbasi; Iran
70 kg	Abdollah Movahed; Iran	Enyu Valchev; Bulgaria	Danzandarjaagiin Sereeter; Mongolia
78 kg	Mahmut Atalay; Turkey	Daniel Robin; France	Tömöriin Artag; Mongolia
87 kg	Boris Michail Gurevich; Soviet Union	Jigjidiin Mönkhbat; Mongolia	Prodan Gardzhev; Bulgaria
97 kg	Ahmet Ayık; Turkey	Shota Lomidze; Soviet Union	József Csatári; Hungary
+97 kg	Aleksandr Medved; Soviet Union	Osman Duraliev; Bulgaria	Wilfried Dietrich; West Germany

=== Greco-Roman ===
Games	Gold	Silver	Bronze
52 kg	Petar Kirov; Bulgaria	Vladimir Bakulin; Soviet Union	Miroslav Zeman; Czechoslovakia
57 kg	János Varga; Hungary	Ion Baciu; Romania	Ivan Kochergin; Soviet Union
63 kg	Roman Rurua; Soviet Union	Hideo Fujimoto; Japan	Simion Popescu; Romania
70 kg	Muneji Munemura; Japan	Stevan Horvat; Yugoslavia	Petros Galaktopoulos; Greece
78 kg	Rudolf Vesper; East Germany	Daniel Robin; France	Károly Bajkó; Hungary
87 kg	Lothar Metz; East Germany	Valentin Oleynik; Soviet Union	Branislav Simić; Yugoslavia
97 kg	Boyan Radev; Bulgaria	Nikolai Yakovenko; Soviet Union	Nicolae Martinescu; Romania
+97 kg	István Kozma; Hungary	Anatoly Roshchin; Soviet Union	Petr Kment; Czechoslovakia

== Medal table ==
Rank	Nation	Gold	Silver	Bronze	Total
1	Japan	4	1	0	5
2	Soviet Union	3	5	1	9
3	Bulgaria	2	3	1	6
4	Hungary	2	0	2	4
5	East Germany	2	0	0	2
5	Turkey	2	0	0	2
7	Iran	1	0	2	3
8	France	0	2	0	2
8	United States	0	2	0	2
10	Mongolia	0	1	3	4
11	Romania	0	1	2	3
12	Yugoslavia	0	1	1	2
13	Czechoslovakia	0	0	2	2
14	Greece	0	0	1	1
14	West Germany	0	0	1	1
Totals (15 entries)		16	16	16	48

== Participating nations ==
A total of 297 wrestlers from 46 nations competed at the Mexico City Games:

- Afghanistan (5)
- Argentina (3)
- Australia (3)
- Austria (1)
- Belgium (2)
- Bulgaria (16)
- Canada (7)
- Cuba (3)
- Czechoslovakia (6)
- Denmark (3)
- Dominican Republic (2)
- Ecuador (2)
- Egypt (4)
- Finland (9)
- France (4)
- East Germany (10)
- West Germany (11)
- Great Britain (4)
- Greece (8)
- Guatemala (5)
- Hungary (13)
- India (4)
- Iran (9)
- Iraq (1)
- Italy (5)
- Japan (15)
- Lebanon (2)
- South Korea (8)
- Mexico (12)
- Mongolia (8)
- Morocco (4)
- Norway (3)
- Pakistan (2)
- Panama (2)
- Philippines (4)
- Poland (12)
- Portugal (4)
- Romania (12)
- Soviet Union (16)
- Sweden (7)
- Switzerland (3)
- Syria (2)
- Turkey (16)
- United States (16)
- Yugoslavia (8)

== See also ==
- List of World and Olympic Champions in men's freestyle wrestling
- List of World and Olympic Champions in Greco-Roman wrestling
