= Josef Engel =

Czech wrestler (born 1942)

Josef Engel (born 3 July 1942) is a Czech former wrestler who competed in the 1968 Summer Olympics and in the 1972 Summer Olympics.
