= Insurgentes Ice Rink =

Arena in Mexico City, Mexico

Coordinates: 19.35°N 99.19°W

The Insurgentes Ice Rink is an indoor arena located in Mexico City that hosted the wrestling competitions for the 1968 Summer Olympics.
