= Wrestling at the 1972 Summer Olympics – Men's freestyle 90 kg =

Men's freestyle 90 kg at the Games of the XX Olympiad
- Venue: Messe München
- Dates: 27–31 August 1972
- Competitors: 23 from 23 nations

Medalists
1st place, gold medalist(s)		Ben Peterson	United States
2nd place, silver medalist(s)		Gennadi Strakhov	Soviet Union
3rd place, bronze medalist(s)		Károly Bajkó	Hungary

The Men's Freestyle 90 kg at the 1972 Summer Olympics as part of the wrestling program at the Fairgrounds, Judo and Wrestling Hall.

== Medalists ==
Gold	Ben Peterson; United States
Silver	Gennadi Strakhov; Soviet Union
Bronze	Károly Bajkó; Hungary

== Tournament results ==
The competition used a form of negative points tournament, with negative points given for any result short of a fall. Accumulation of 6 negative points eliminated the wrestler. When only two or three wrestlers remained, a special final round is used to determine the order of the medals.

Legend

- DNA — Did not appear
- TPP — Total penalty points
- MPP — Match penalty points

Penalties

- 0 — Won by Fall, Passivity, Injury and Forfeit
- 0.5 — Won by Technical Superiority
- 1 — Won by Points
- 2 — Draw
- 2.5 — Draw, Passivity
- 3 — Lost by Points
- 3.5 — Lost by Technical Superiority
- 4 — Lost by Fall, Passivity, Injury and Forfeit

=== Round 1 ===
TPP	MPP		Time		MPP	TPP
0	0	Károly Bajkó (HUN)	5:50	Makoto Kamada (JPN)	4	4
0	0	Reza Khorrami (IRI)	0:53	Etienne Martinetti (SUI)	4	4
4	4	Alioune Camara (SEN)	2:11	Raúl García (MEX)	0	0
1	1	Ben Peterson (USA)		Paweł Kurczewski (POL)	3	3
0	0	George Saunders (CAN)	1:59	Chandgi Ram (IND)	4	4
0.5	0.5	Gennadi Strakhov (URS)		Roland Andersson (SWE)	3.5	3.5
1	1	Bárbaro Morgan (CUB)		Ion Marton (ROU)	3	3
4	4	Kwak Kwang-Woong (KOR)	1:42	Günter Spindler (GDR)	0	0
1	1	Michel Grangier (FRA)		Umberto Marcheggiani (ITA)	3	3
4	4	Ronald Grinstead (GBR)	3:41	Rusi Petrov (BUL)	0	0
1	1	Mehmet Güçlü (TUR)		Jigjidiin Mönkhbat (MGL)	3	3
0		Ernst Knoll (FRG)		Bye		

=== Round 2 ===
TPP	MPP		Time		MPP	TPP
3	3	Ernst Knoll (FRG)		Károly Bajkó (HUN)	1	1
7	3	Makoto Kamada (JPN)		Reza Khorrami (IRI)	1	1
4	0	Etienne Martinetti (SUI)	1:38	Alioune Camara (SEN)	4	8
4	4	Raúl García (MEX)	8:09	Ben Peterson (USA)	0	1
4	1	Paweł Kurczewski (POL)		George Saunders (CAN)	3	3
8	4	Chandgi Ram (IND)	2:45	Gennadi Strakhov (URS)	0	0.5
6.5	3	Roland Andersson (SWE)		Bárbaro Morgan (CUB)	1	2
6	3	Ion Marton (ROU)		Kwak Kwang-Woong (KOR)	1	5
3	3	Günter Spindler (GDR)		Michel Grangier (FRA)	1	2
5	2	Umberto Marcheggiani (ITA)		Ronald Grinstead (GBR)	2	6
1	1	Rusi Petrov (BUL)		Mehmet Güçlü (TUR)	3	4
3		Jigjidiin Mönkhbat (MGL)		Bye		

=== Round 3 ===
TPP	MPP		Time		MPP	TPP
6	3	Ernst Knoll (FRG)		Reza Khorrami (IRI)	1	2
1.5	0.5	Károly Bajkó (HUN)		Etienne Martinetti (SUI)	3.5	7.5
7.5	3.5	Raúl García (MEX)		Paweł Kurczewski (POL)	0.5	4.5
3	2	Ben Peterson (USA)		Gennadi Strakhov (URS)	2	2.5
2	0	Bárbaro Morgan (CUB)	1:00	Kwak Kwang-Woong (KOR)	4	9
3.5	0.5	Günter Spindler (GDR)		Umberto Marcheggiani (ITA)	3.5	8.5
5.5	3.5	Michel Grangier (FRA)		Rusi Petrov (BUL)	0.5	1.5
4		Mehmet Güçlü (TUR)		Bye		
3		Jigjidiin Mönkhbat (MGL)		DNA		
3		George Saunders (CAN)		DNA		

=== Round 4 ===
TPP	MPP		Time		MPP	TPP
8	4	Mehmet Güçlü (TUR)	8:25	Károly Bajkó (HUN)	0	3
5	3	Reza Khorrami (IRI)		Ben Peterson (USA)	1	4
8.5	4	Paweł Kurczewski (POL)	1:52	Gennadi Strakhov (URS)	0	2.5
3	1	Bárbaro Morgan (CUB)		Michel Grangier (FRA)	3	8.5
4.5	1	Günter Spindler (GDR)		Rusi Petrov (BUL)	3	4.5

=== Round 5 ===
TPP	MPP		Time		MPP	TPP
5	2	Károly Bajkó (HUN)		Reza Khorrami (IRI)	2	7
4	0	Ben Peterson (USA)	5:24	Bárbaro Morgan (CUB)	4	7
3	0.5	Gennadi Strakhov (URS)		Günter Spindler (GDR)	3.5	8
4.5		Rusi Petrov (BUL)		Bye		

=== Round 6 ===
TPP	MPP		Time		MPP	TPP
8.5	4	Rusi Petrov (BUL)	2:41	Ben Peterson (USA)	0	4
8	3	Károly Bajkó (HUN)		Gennadi Strakhov (URS)	1	4

=== Final ===
Results from the preliminary round are carried forward into the final (shown in yellow).

TPP	MPP		Time		MPP	TPP
2	2	Ben Peterson (USA)		Gennadi Strakhov (URS)	2	2

The tie was broken by comparing the finalists' falls records. Peterson had 3, while Strakhov had 2.

== Final standings ==
1. Ben Peterson (USA)
2. Gennadi Strakhov (URS)
3. Károly Bajkó (HUN)
4. Rusi Petrov (BUL)
5. Bárbaro Morgan (CUB) and Reza Khorrami (IRI)
6. -
7. Günter Spindler (GDR)
