= Ben Peterson (wrestler) =

American wrestler (born 1950)

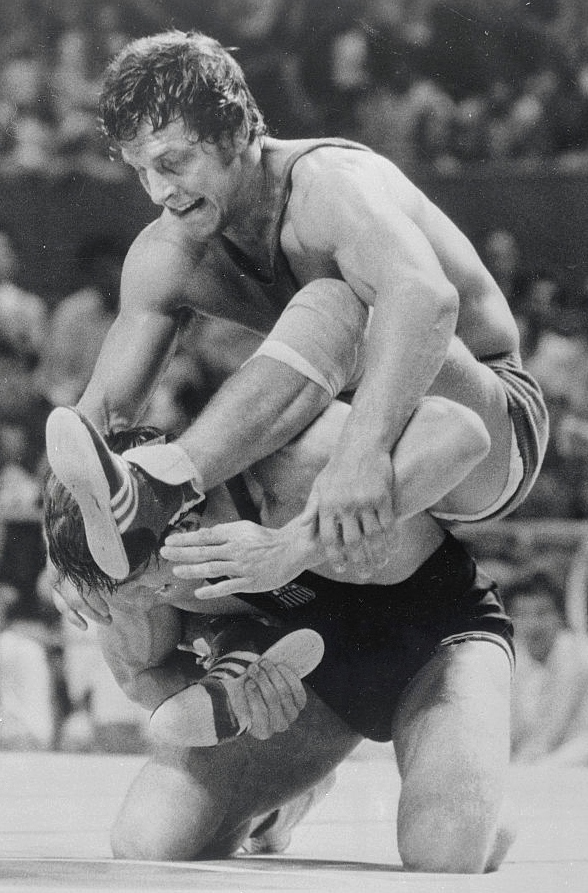
- Peterson (bottom) at the 1976 Olympics

Personal information
- Full name: Benjamin Lee Peterson
- Born: June 27, 1950 (age 76) Barron County, Wisconsin, U.S.
- Height: 187 cm (6 ft 2 in)

Sport
- Country: United States
- Sport: Wrestling
- Events: Freestyle and Folkstyle
- College team: Iowa State
- Team: USA
- Coached by: Harold Nichols
Medal record
Men's freestyle wrestling
Representing the United States
Olympic Games
Gold medal – first place	1972 Munich	90 kg
Silver medal – second place	1976 Montreal	90 kg
World Championships
Bronze medal – third place	1973 Tehran	90 kg
Pan American Games
Gold medal – first place	1975 Mexico City	90 kg
Collegiate Wrestling
Representing the Iowa State Cyclones
NCAA Division I Championships
Gold medal – first place	1971 Auburn	190 lb
Gold medal – first place	1972 College Park	190 lb

Benjamin Lee Peterson (born June 27, 1950) is a retired American freestyle wrestler. He competed at the 1972 and 1976 Olympics and won a gold and a silver medal, respectively. As a college wrestler, Peterson was a two-time NCAA champion at Iowa State. He founded the "Camp of Champs," which brought in Olympic wrestlers to train with high schoolers. Peterson also coached wrestling at Maranatha Baptist University for 28 years.

== Early life ==
Peterson was born in Barron County, Wisconsin but grew up on a dairy farm in nearby Comstock. While attending Cumberland High School, Peterson competed in both football and wrestling. As a senior, he finished runner-up at the state wrestling tournament.

== College career ==
Peterson continued his wrestling career at Iowa State University where he competed in the 190 pound weight class and studied architecture. Peterson went on to capture three Big Eight championships and back-to-back NCAA titles in 1971 and 1972.

Peterson would later be one of the first inductees into the Iowa State Hall of Fame in 1998.

== Senior level career and coaching ==
After his prep career came to an end, Peterson continued competing at the international level with great success. At the 1972 Munich Olympics Peterson won gold in the 90 kg division. He followed that up with bronze at the 1973 World Championships in Tehran and gold at the 1975 Pan American Games in Mexico City. At the 1976 Montreal Olympics, Peterson would once again return to the podium, with silver in the 90 kg weight class.

Peterson's older brother, John Peterson, also competed in both the 1972 and 1976 Summer Olympics as a freestyle wrestler, winning a silver medal in 1972 and gold medal in 1976. At the conclusion of the Montreal Olympic games, Peterson would retire from competitive wrestling to focus on coaching.

In 1976, Peterson began his coaching career as head coach at Maranatha Baptist University in Watertown, Wisconsin, a position he would hold for the next 27 years. In 1977, Ben along with his brother John, would start the Camp of Champs Wrestling Camps. The camp is a faith-based wrestling skills camp.

Peterson was inducted into the National Wrestling Hall of Fame as a Distinguished Member in 1986.

== Peterson Roll ==
Ben is often credited with having invented a version of the Granby Roll wrestling move, popularly called the Peterson Roll, but denies having invented the move. He says that he used the move during the widely viewed Olympic Games, which is one reason the move became connected to him.

== Olympic game matches ==
Res.	Record	Opponent	Score	Date	Event	Location
1976 Olympic Silver Medalist at 90kg
Loss	11–1–1	(Soviet Union) Levan Tediashvili	5–11	July 29, 1976	1976 Olympic Games	(Canada) Montreal
Win	11–0–1	(East Germany) Horst Stottmeister	13–8	July 29, 1976	1976 Olympic Games	(Canada) Montreal
Win	10–0–1	(Poland) Paweł Kurczewski	13–4	July 29, 1976	1976 Olympic Games	(Canada) Montreal
Win	9–0–1	(Cuba) Bárbaro Morgan	Fall	July 29, 1976	1976 Olympic Games	(Canada) Montreal
Win	8–0–1	(Japan) Yoshiaki Yatsu	19–2	July 29, 1976	1976 Olympic Games	(Canada) Montreal
Win	7–0–1	(Bulgaria) Shukri Akhmedov	14–13	July 29, 1976	1976 Olympic Games	(Canada) Montreal
Win	6–0–1	(Romania) Stelică Morcov	7–4	July 29, 1976	1976 Olympic Games	(Canada) Montreal
1972 Olympic Gold Medalist at 90kg
Win	5–0–1	(Bulgaria) Rusi Petrov	Fall	August 30, 1972	1972 Olympic Games	(West Germany) Munich
Win	4–0–1	(Cuba) Bárbaro Morgan	Fall	August 30, 1972	1972 Olympic Games	(West Germany) Munich
Win	3–0–1	(Iran) Reza Khorrami	Won	August 30, 1972	1972 Olympic Games	(West Germany) Munich
Draw	2–0–1	(Soviet Union) Gennady Strakhov	Draw	August 30, 1972	1972 Olympic Games	(West Germany) Munich
Win	2–0	(Mexico) Raúl García	Fall	August 30, 1972	1972 Olympic Games	(West Germany) Munich
Win	1–0	(Poland) Paweł Kurczewski	Won	August 30, 1972	1972 Olympic Games	(West Germany) Munich
