= Wrestling at the 1976 Summer Olympics – Men's freestyle 90 kg =

Men's freestyle 90 kg at the Games of the XXI Olympiad
- Venue: Maurice Richard Arena
- Dates: 27–31 July 1976
- Competitors: 21 from 21 nations

Medalists
1st place, gold medalist(s)		Levan Tediashvili	Soviet Union
2nd place, silver medalist(s)		Ben Peterson	United States
3rd place, bronze medalist(s)		Stelică Morcov	Romania

The Men's Freestyle 90 kg at the 1976 Summer Olympics as part of the wrestling program were held at the Maurice Richard Arena.

== Tournament results ==
The competition used a form of negative points tournament, with negative points given for any result short of a fall. Accumulation of 6 negative points eliminated the loser wrestler. When only three wrestlers remain, a special final round is used to determine the order of the medals.

Legend

- TF — Won by Fall
- IN — Won by Opponent Injury
- DQ — Won by Passivity
- D1 — Won by Passivity, the winner is passive too
- D2 — Both wrestlers lost by Passivity
- FF — Won by Forfeit
- DNA — Did not appear
- TPP — Total penalty points
- MPP — Match penalty points

Penalties

- 0 — Won by Fall, Technical Superiority, Passivity, Injury and Forfeit
- 0.5 — Won by Points, 8-11 points difference
- 1 — Won by Points, 1-7 points difference
- 2 — Won by Passivity, the winner is passive too
- 3 — Lost by Points, 1-7 points difference
- 3.5 — Lost by Points, 8-11 points difference
- 4 — Lost by Fall, Technical Superiority, Passivity, Injury and Forfeit

=== Round 1 ===
TPP	MPP		Score		MPP	TPP
4	4	Maurice Allan (GBR)	4 - 32	Frank Andersson (SWE)	0	0
0	0	Levan Tediashvili (URS)	TF / 1:47	Wayne Thomas (ISV)	4	4
4	4	Peter Neumair (FRG)	TF / 0:46	Horst Stottmeister (GDR)	0	0
3	3	Géza Molnár (HUN)	3 - 6	Paweł Kurczewski (POL)	1	1
0	0	Muhammad Salah-ud-din (PAK)	TF / 3:53	Dashdorjiin Tserentogtokh (MGL)	4	4
4	4	Keijo Manni (FIN)	TF / 2:59	Shukri Ahmedov (BUL)	0	0
1	1	Ben Peterson (USA)	7 - 4	Stelică Morcov (ROU)	3	3
0.5	0.5	Bárbaro Morgan (CUB)	13 - 5	İsmail Temiz (TUR)	3.5	3.5
0	0	Yoshiaki Yatsu (JPN)	TF / 8:32	Alireza Soleimani (IRI)	4	4
4	4	Michel Grangier (FRA)	TF / 0:59	Terry Paice (CAN)	0	0
0		Ambroise Sarr (SEN)		Bye		

=== Round 2 ===
TPP	MPP		Score		MPP	TPP
4	4	Ambroise Sarr (SEN)	TF / 3:59	Maurice Allan (GBR)	0	4
4	4	Frank Andersson (SWE)	2 - 16	Levan Tediashvili (URS)	0	0
8	4	Wayne Thomas (ISV)	TF / 0:40	Peter Neumair (FRG)	0	4
0	0	Horst Stottmeister (GDR)	DQ / 5:46	Géza Molnár (HUN)	4	7
1	0	Paweł Kurczewski (POL)	TF / 1:50	Salah Uddin (PAK)	4	4
8	4	Dashdorjiin Tserentogtokh (MGL)	TF / 5:35	Keijo Manni (FIN)	0	4
3	3	Shukri Ahmedov (BUL)	13 - 14	Ben Peterson (USA)	1	2
4	1	Stelică Morcov (ROU)	9 - 8	Bárbaro Morgan (CUB)	3	3.5
6.5	3	İsmail Temiz (TUR)	7 - 13	Yoshiaki Yatsu (JPN)	1	1
4	0	Alireza Soleimani (IRI)	21 - 7	Michel Grangier (FRA)	4	8
0		Terry Paice (CAN)		Bye		

=== Round 3 ===
TPP	MPP		Score		MPP	TPP
0	0	Terry Paice (CAN)	DQ / 5:20	Ambroise Sarr (SEN)	4	8
8	4	Maurice Allan (GBR)	TF / 1:05	Levan Tediashvili (URS)	0	0
4	0	Frank Andersson (SWE)	TF / 3:56	Peter Neumair (FRG)	4	8
0	0	Horst Stottmeister (GDR)	TF / 5:11	Paweł Kurczewski (POL)	4	5
8	4	Salah Uddin (PAK)	TF / 5:17	Keijo Manni (FIN)	0	4
7	4	Shukri Ahmedov (BUL)	DQ / 7:26	Stelică Morcov (ROU)	0	4
2	0	Ben Peterson (USA)	19 - 2	Yoshiaki Yatsu (JPN)	4	5
3.5	0	Bárbaro Morgan (CUB)	TF / 2:55	Alireza Soleimani (IRI)	4	8

=== Round 4 ===
TPP	MPP		Score		MPP	TPP
3	3	Terry Paice (CAN)	3 - 8	Frank Andersson (SWE)	1	5
0	0	Levan Tediashvili (URS)	17 - 3	Horst Stottmeister (GDR)	4	4
5	0	Paweł Kurczewski (POL)	TF / 0:57	Keijo Manni (FIN)	4	8
2	0	Ben Peterson (USA)	TF / 7:39	Bárbaro Morgan (CUB)	4	7.5
4	0	Stelică Morcov (ROU)	DQ / 8:36	Yoshiaki Yatsu (JPN)	4	9

=== Round 5 ===
TPP	MPP		Score		MPP	TPP
7	4	Terry Paice (CAN)	DQ / 4:30	Levan Tediashvili (URS)	0	0
8.5	3.5	Frank Andersson (SWE)	6 - 17	Horst Stottmeister (GDR)	0.5	4.5
8.5	3.5	Paweł Kurczewski (POL)	4 - 13	Ben Peterson (USA)	0.5	2.5
4		Stelică Morcov (ROU)		Bye		

=== Round 6 ===
TPP	MPP		Score		MPP	TPP
7	3	Stelică Morcov (ROU)	2 - 7	Levan Tediashvili (URS)	1	1
7.5	3	Horst Stottmeister (GDR)	8 - 13	Ben Peterson (USA)	1	3.5

=== Final ===
Results from the preliminary round are carried forward into the final (shown in yellow).

TPP	MPP		Score		MPP	TPP
	1	Ben Peterson (USA)	7 - 4	Stelică Morcov (ROU)	3	
6	3	Stelică Morcov (ROU)	2 - 7	Levan Tediashvili (URS)	1	
2	1	Levan Tediashvili (URS)	11 - 5	Ben Peterson (USA)	3	4

== Final standings ==
1. Levan Tediashvili (URS)
2. Ben Peterson (USA)
3. Stelică Morcov (ROM)
4. Horst Stottmeister (GDR)
5. Terry Paice (CAN)
6. Paweł Kurczewski (POL)
7. Frank Andersson (SWE)
8. Bárbaro Morgan (CUB)
