= Wrestling at the 1968 Summer Olympics – Men's freestyle 87 kg =

Men's freestyle middleweight at the Games of the XIX Olympiad
- Venue: Insurgentes Ice Rink
- Date: 17 – 20 October 1968
- Competitors: 22 from 22 nations

Medalists
1st place, gold medalist(s)		Boris Gurevich	Soviet Union
2nd place, silver medalist(s)		Jigjidiin Mönkhbat	Mongolia
3rd place, bronze medalist(s)		Prodan Gardzhev	Bulgaria

The Men's Freestyle middleweight at the 1968 Summer Olympics was part of the wrestling program were held at the Insurgentes Ice Rink from October 17 to October 20. The middleweight allowed wrestlers up to 87 kilograms.

== Tournament results ==
The competition used a form of negative points tournament, with negative points given for any result short of a fall. Accumulation of 6 negative points eliminated the wrestler. When only two or three wrestlers remain, a special final round is used to determine the order of the medals.

Legend

- TF — Won by Fall
- DQ — Won by Passivity or forfeit
- D2 — Both wrestlers lost by Passivity
- DNA — Did not appear

Penalties

- 0 — Won by Fall and Disqualification
- 0.5 — Won by Technical Superiority
- 1 — Won by Points
- 2 — Draw
- 2.5 — Draw, Passivity
- 3 — Lost by Points
- 3.5 — Lost by Technical Superiority
- 4 — Lost by Fall and Disqualification

=== 1st round ===
TPP	MPP		Score		MPP	TPP
3	3	Ghulam Dastagir (AFG)		Julio Graffigna (ARG)	1	1
2	2	Prodan Gardzhev (BUL)		Tom Peckham (USA)	2	2
1	1	Francisc Balla (ROU)		Mansour Mahdizadeh (IRI)	3	3
1	1	Géza Hollósi (HUN)		Umberto Marcheggiani (ITA)	3	3
3	3	Robert Chamberot (CAN)		Ronald Grinstead (GBR)	1	1
4	4	Robert Nihon (BAH)	TF / 1:59	Boris Gurevich (URS)	0	0
2.5	2.5	Jan Wypiorczyk (POL)		Shigeru Endo (JPN)	2.5	2.5
3	3	Ernst Knoll (FRG)		Lupe Lara (CUB)	1	1
2	2	Jean-Marie Chardonnens (SUI)		Raúl García (MEX)	2	2
1	1	Jigjidiin Mönkhbat (MGL)		Peter Döring (GDR)	3	3
4	4	José Manuel Hernández (GUA)	TF / 1:45	Hüseyin Gürsoy (TUR)	0	0

=== 2nd round ===
TPP	MPP		Score		MPP	TPP
7	4	Ghulam Dastagir (AFG)	TF / 1:16	Prodan Gardzhev (BUL)	0	2
4	3	Julio Graffigna (ARG)		Tom Peckham (USA)	1	3
5	4	Francisc Balla (ROU)	DQ	Géza Hollósi (HUN)	4	5
3.5	0.5	Umberto Marcheggiani (ITA)		Robert Chamberot (CAN)	3.5	6.5
1	0	Ronald Grinstead (GBR)	TF / 4:33	Robert Nihon (BAH)	4	8
0	0	Boris Gurevich (URS)	TF / 10:36	Jan Wypiorczyk (POL)	4	6.5
3.5	1	Shigeru Endo (JPN)		Ernst Knoll (FRG)	3	6
2	1	Lupe Lara (CUB)		Jean-Marie Chardonnens (SUI)	3	5
6	4	Raúl García (MEX)	TF / 1:17	Jigjidiin Mönkhbat (MGL)	0	1
3	0	Peter Döring (GDR)	TF / 0:37	José Manuel Hernández (GUA)	4	8
		Hüseyin Gürsoy (TUR)				

=== 3rd round ===
TPP	MPP		Score		MPP	TPP
7	3	Julio Graffigna (ARG)		Hüseyin Gürsoy (TUR)	1	1
2	0	Prodan Gardzhev (BUL)	TF / 6:54	Francisc Balla (ROU)	4	9
3	0	Tom Peckham (USA)	TF / 1:39	Umberto Marcheggiani (ITA)	4	7.5
4.5	3.5	Ronald Grinstead (GBR)		Boris Gurevich (URS)	0.5	0.5
4.5	1	Shigeru Endo (JPN)		Lupe Lara (CUB)	3	5
8.5	3.5	Jean-Marie Chardonnens (SUI)		Jigjidiin Mönkhbat (MGL)	0.5	1.5
		Peter Döring (GDR)		Bye		

=== 4th round ===
TPP	MPP		Score		MPP	TPP
6	3	Peter Döring (GDR)		Hüseyin Gürsoy (TUR)	1	2
2.5	0.5	Prodan Gardzhev (BUL)		Ronald Grinstead (GBR)	3.5	8
3	0	Tom Peckham (USA)	TF / 1:19	Shigeru Endo (JPN)	4	8.5
0.5	0	Boris Gurevich (URS)	TF / 0:49	Lupe Lara (CUB)	4	9
		Jigjidiin Mönkhbat (MGL)		Bye		

=== 5th round ===
TPP	MPP		Score		MPP	TPP
3.5	2	Prodan Gardzhev (BUL)		Jigjidiin Mönkhbat (MGL)	2	4.5
5	2	Tom Peckham (USA)		Hüseyin Gürsoy (TUR)	2	4
		Boris Gurevich (URS)		Bye		

=== 6th round ===
TPP	MPP		Score		MPP	TPP
2.5	2	Boris Gurevich (URS)		Jigjidiin Mönkhbat (MGL)	2	5.5
5.5	1	Prodan Gardzhev (BUL)		Hüseyin Gürsoy (TUR)	3	7
		Tom Peckham (USA)		Bye		

=== Final round ===
TPP	MPP		Score		MPP	TPP
8	3	Tom Peckham (USA)		Jigjidiin Mönkhbat (MGL)	1	6.5
7.5	2	Prodan Gardzhev (BUL)		Boris Gurevich (URS)	2	4.5

== Final standings ==
1. Boris Gurevich (URS)
2. Jigjidiin Mönkhbat (MGL)
3. Prodan Gardzhev (BUL)
4. Tom Peckham (USA)
5. Hüseyin Gürsoy (TUR)
6. Peter Döring (GDR)

== Sources ==
- Trueblood, Beatrice, ed. (1969). Official Report of the Organizing Committee of the Games of the XIX Olympiad Mexico 1968 (Volume 3) (PDF). Vol. 3. pp. 335, 722–723. Archived from the original (PDF) on April 28, 2015.
