= Jigjidiin Mönkhbat =

Mongolian wrestler (1941–2018)

Personal information
- Native name: Жигжидийн Мөнхбат
- Nationality: Mongolian
- Born: June 1, 1941 Erdenesant, Töv Province, Mongolia
- Died: April 9, 2018 (aged 76)

Sport
- Country: Mongolia
- Sport: Wrestling
- Events: Freestyle wrestling, Mongolian wrestling
Medal record
Men's freestyle wrestling
Representing Mongolia
Olympic Games
Men's Freestyle wrestling
Silver medal – second place	1968 Mexico City	87 kg
World Championships
Men's Freestyle wrestling
Bronze medal – third place	1967 New Delhi	87 kg
Asian Games
Men's Greco-Roman wrestling
Bronze medal – third place	1974 Tehran	90kg

Jigjidiin Mönkhbat (Mongolian: Жигжидийн Мөнхбат; 1 June 1941 – 9 April 2018) was a Mongolian wrestler, unbeaten 1968 vice Olympic champion in the 87 kg division, and multiple national champion in Мongolian Вökh.

Mönkhbat placed fourth in the middleweight (87 kg) division at the 1966 World Wrestling Championships, defeating the strongest 1964 Olympic wrestler and reigning three-time World champion Mansour Mehdizadeh in the first round.

At the 1967 World Wrestling Championships Mönkhbat held a bronze medal, ahead of Majid Aghili.

At the 1968 Summer Olympics he won the silver medal in the men's Freestyle Middleweight category (87 kg), behind gold medalist Boris Michail Gurevich and ahead of bronze medalist Prodan Gardzhev. Mönkhbat left the tournament as undefeated wrestler, his results in the Olympics were 4 wins, 2 draws, and 0 losses:

Round	Opponent	Сountry	Results	Penalties	Time
1	Peter Döring	(East Germany)	Won by Points	1
2	Raúl García	(Mexico)	Won by Fall (TF)	0	(1:17)
3	Jean-Marie Chardonnens	(Switzerland)	Won by Technical Superiority	0,5
4			Bye	0
5	Prodan Gardzhev	(Bulgaria)	Draw	2
6	Boris Gurevich	(Soviet Union)	Draw	2
7	Tom Peckham	(United States)	Won by Points	1

Mönkhbat was a State grand champion in bökh, a top rank in the sport, with six Naadam championship wins (1963–1967, 1974). His name Mönkhbat means "Eternal firm" in the Mongolian language.

Mönkhbat was the father of professional sumo wrestler Hakuhō Shō, who held the top rank of yokozuna in that sport before retiring. His son Hakuhō regards his six Nadaam championships as the equivalent of 36 tournament championships in sumo (as sumo tournaments are held six times a year) and used that as motivation to keep going even after passing Taihō's record of 32 championships.

== Bökh career record ==
Mönkhbat took the bökh wrestling tournament at the Naadam festival six times: from 1963 to 1967, and in 1974. In 1963, he earned the State lion title after defeating the State lion Mijiddorj. Following victories over the State champion Beejin and Khorloogiin Bayanmönkh in 1964 and 1965, he attained the State champion title. In 1966 and 1967, he won against the State grand champion Damdin and State lion Khorloogiin Bayanmönkh, and was awarded the State grand champion title. In 1974, he beat the Olympic medalist, World champion, and reigning national bökh champion Khorloogiin Bayanmönkh.

Jigjidiin Mönkhbat
Year	Level	Participants	Rank	Wins	Earned title	Notes
1994	State	768	State Grand Champion	6	Unud Tuvshin, Khotlooriig Bayasuulagch	
1992	State	512	State Grand Champion	0		
1991	State	512	State Grand Champion	4		
1990	State	512	State Grand Champion	4		
1989	State	512	State Grand Champion	4		
1988	State	512	State Grand Champion	4		
1987	State	512	State Grand Champion	4		
1986	State	512	State Grand Champion	4		
1985	State	512	State Grand Champion	6	Bat Nyagt Itgelt	
1984	State	512	State Grand Champion	4		
1983	State	512	State Grand Champion	7	Tod Sonin Uzesgelent	
1981	State	512	State Grand Champion	7	Ulemj Badrakh	
1980	State	512	State Grand Champion	8	Manlain Bayasgalant	
1979	State	512	State Grand Champion	7	Bukhnee Duursgalt	
1978	State	512	State Grand Champion	8	Dalai Daichin	
1977	State	512	State Grand Champion	7	Unud Bayasgalant	
1976	State	512	State Grand Champion			Absent due to International Competition.
1975	State	512	State Grand Champion	8	Tumnees Tuguldur	
1974	State	512	State Grand Champion	9	Bayar Naadmiin Manlai	
1973	State	512	State Grand Champion	7	Dayaar Duursagdakh	
1972	State	512	State Grand Champion	8	Dalai Dayan	
1971	State	512	State Grand Champion	6	Bat Nyagt	
1970	State	512	State Grand Champion			Absent due to Olympic Games.
1969	State	512	State Grand Champion	7		
1968	State	512	State Grand Champion	7	Olniig Bayasuulagch	
1967	State	512	State Grand Champion	9		
1966	State	512	State Champion	9	State Grand Champion	
1965	State	512	State Lion	9	State Champion	
1964	State	512	State Lion	9	Ulam Nemekh	
1963	State	512	State Elephant	9	State Lion	
1962	State	512	State Elephant	3		
1961	State	512	Unranked	5	State Elephant	
State Naadam Winner Won at least 5 rounds in State Naadam Aimag/Sum Naadam Promotion

== Legacy ==
In bökh, Mönkhbat won five consecutive tournaments, a feat matched by only two other athletes in the modern history of the sport since 1922.

Mönkhbat's statue was erected in his honor and in celebration of his achievements on July 21, 2021, in his hometown of Erdenesant, Tuv Province, Mongolia. The event also marked the 100th anniversary of Erdensant sum. His student and fellow State Grand Champion Gelegjamtsyn Ösökhbayar attended the opening ceremony.

Mönkhbat was one of the first holders of the highest national record in the international sport, along with the first international chess master and 1964 World Chess Olympiad champion Tüdeviin Üitümen, and first World champion, archer Doljin Demberel.
