= Chandgi Ram =

Indian wrestler (1937–2010)

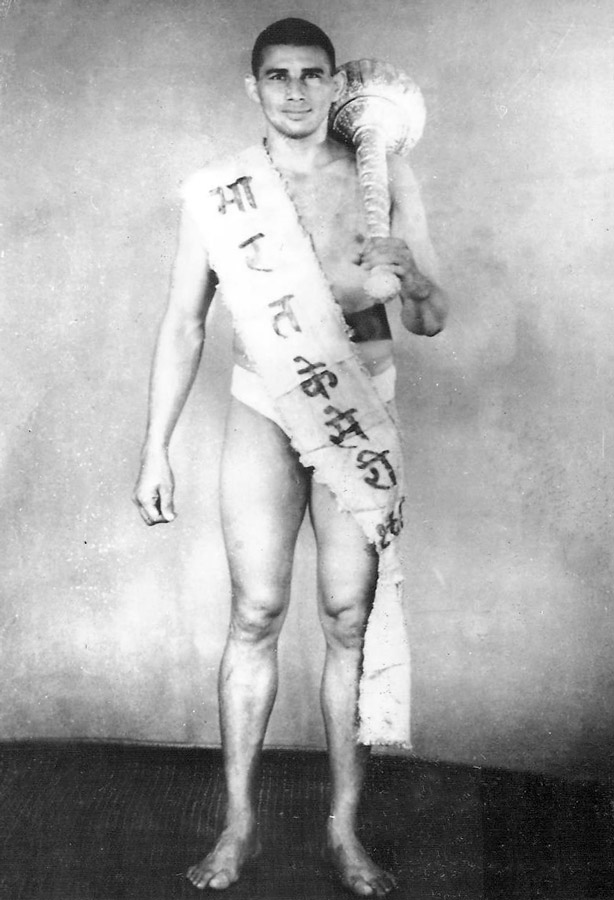
- Chandgi Ram in 1969

Personal information
- Nationality: Indian
- Born: Chandgi Ram Kaliraman; 9 November 1937 Sisai village, Hisar, British India (now in Sisai village, Hisar district, Haryana, India)
- Died: 29 June 2010 (aged 72) Delhi, India
- Height: 6 ft 4 in (193 cm)
- Weight: 198 lb (90 kg)
- Website: masterchandgiram.in

Sport
- Country: India
- Sport: Wrestling
- Event: Freestyle wrestling
Medal record
Men's Freestyle wrestling
Representing India
Asian Games
Gold medal – first place	1970 Bangkok	100 kg

Chandgi Ram Kaliraman (9 November 1937 – 29 June 2010), often referred to as Master Chandgi Ram, was a freestyle wrestler from India. He won gold medal in the 1970 Asian Games and represented India in the 1972 Summer Olympics. Along with amateur wrestling, he was very active in the traditional Indian wrestling, where he had won all major titles, including Hind Kesari, Bharat Kesari, Bharat Bhim, Rustom-e-Hind and Maha Bharat Kesari.

He is remembered for the work that he has done for the introduction, acceptance and popularisation of the women's wrestling in India. Some of his trainees went on to become prominent women's wrestling coaches of the country.

In 1969, Government of India (GoI) conferred the Arjuna Award on him for his achievements in the tradition wrestling. And two years later, he was conferred with the country's fourth highest civilian award – Padma Shri.

== Early and personal life ==
Chandgi Ram Kaliraman was born on 9 November 1937 in Sisai village of British India's Hisar, which is located in the present-day Hisar district of Haryana, India. He took up wrestling at a comparatively older age of 21 and became national champion three years later in 1961. He married three times and had three daughters and three sons.

Ram, who was popularly known as Master Chandgi Ram, served in Indian army's Jat Regiment, along with working as a teacher in his early life. He later on served as Haryana's Additional Director of Sports.

Ram was a lifelong vegetarian. In 1969, he was described as being "ninety kilograms of vegetarian muscle".

== Career ==
Ram became national champion for the first time in 1961 at Ajmer, regaining his title two years later at Jalandhar. Although he represented India in amateur wrestling, he remained very active in the traditional Indian wrestling in 1960s, where he had won all major titles, including Hind Kesari, Bharat Kesari, Bharat Bhim, Rustom-e-Hind and Maha Bharat Kesari. In 1969, Government of India (GoI) conferred the Arjuna Award on him for his achievements in the tradition wrestling.

In the 1970 Asian Games, he represented India in the 100 kg freestyle event. He reached to the final defeating en route the world championships medallist Abolfazl Anvari of Iran. In the final, he defeated Japan's Shizuo Yada, there by winning gold medal.

For the 1972 Summer Olympics, he shifted to lower weight category and represented India in the 90 kg freestyle event. He lost his first bout to Canada's George Saunders. He was eliminated after losing his next bout to the eventual silver medallist Gennady Strakhov.

After participating in the 1972 Olympics, he shifted from Haryana to Delhi, where he opened up his wrestling training centre in 1975 – Chandgi Ram Vyayamshala.

== Work for the women's wrestling in India ==
Ram's struggle to introduce women's wrestling in India begun in 1997, which was the year of its inclusion in the Olympics. To start with, he persuaded both of his daughters – Sonika Kaliraman and Deepika Kaliraman – to join wrestling. His wrestling training center, which is commonly known as the Chandgi Ram Akhara, became India's first training center for women's wrestling. He also started to persuade coaches and wrestlers around the country to introduce women's exhibition matches in the traditional wrestling tournaments. All these efforts resulted in severe opposition both from the outsiders and the insiders of his training center. At one of the instances, when Ram's two daughters went to the wrestling pit during a village tournament of Haryana, they, along with Ram, were stoned and chased by the villagers. But, in spite of all the opposition, he kept on his efforts. Sonika went on to win country's highest wrestling title – Bharat Kesri – along with becoming Asian Junior Wrestling Champion.

Ram also influenced future women's wrestling coaches. One of his wards, Mahavir Singh Phogat – who trained at Ram's center since the age of 16 – was persuaded by Ram to introduce his daughters to wrestling. Phogat went on to train his daughters Geeta and Babita, along with their cousin Vinesh, all of whom became international wrestlers. Jabbar, who got inclined toward women's wrestling during his training stint under Ram, went on to train Alka Tomar. Jagroop Rathi, Ram's co-coach, was also convinced by him to introduce his daughter Neha Rathi into wrestling.

== Death ==
Ram died on 29 June 2010 from a heart attack, aged 72.

== Awards ==
- Arjuna Award
- Padma Shri

== Legacy ==
- A sports stadium in Uttar Pradesh is named after him – Master Chandgiram Sports Stadium, Saifai.
- All India Chandgi Ram Gold Cup Wrestling Tournament is annually organised in his remembrance.
