= Wrestling at the 1971 Pan American Games =

- No. of events: 10

This page shows the results of the Men's Wrestling Competition at the 1971 Pan American Games, held from July 30 to August 13, 1971, in Cali, Colombia. Freestyle wrestling was the only discipline at these Pan Am Games.

== Men's competition ==
=== Freestyle (– 48 kg) ===
Rank	Name
1st place, gold medalist(s)	Sergio Gonzalez (USA)
2nd place, silver medalist(s)	Miguel Alonso (CUB)
3rd place, bronze medalist(s)	Oscar Luña (VEN)

=== Freestyle (– 52 kg) ===
Rank	Name
1st place, gold medalist(s)	Miguel Tachín (CUB)
2nd place, silver medalist(s)	Florentino Martínez (MEX)
3rd place, bronze medalist(s)	Wanelge Castillo (PAN)

=== Freestyle (– 57 kg) ===
Rank	Name
1st place, gold medalist(s)	Donald Behm (USA)
2nd place, silver medalist(s)	Jorge Ramos (CUB)
3rd place, bronze medalist(s)	Eduardo Maggiolo (ARG)

=== Freestyle (– 62 kg) ===
Rank	Name
1st place, gold medalist(s)	David Pruzansky (USA)
2nd place, silver medalist(s)	Francisco Ramos (CUB)
3rd place, bronze medalist(s)	Patrick Bolger (CAN)

=== Freestyle (– 68 kg) ===
Rank	Name
1st place, gold medalist(s)	Dan Gable (USA)
2nd place, silver medalist(s)	José Ramos (CUB)
3rd place, bronze medalist(s)	Segundo Olmedo (PAN)

=== Freestyle (– 74 kg) ===
Rank	Name
1st place, gold medalist(s)	Francisco Lebeque (CUB)
2nd place, silver medalist(s)	Wayne Wells (USA)
3rd place, bronze medalist(s)	Nestor González (ARG)

=== Freestyle (– 82 kg) ===
Rank	Name
1st place, gold medalist(s)	Lupe Lara (CUB)
2nd place, silver medalist(s)	Bob Anderson (USA)
3rd place, bronze medalist(s)	Taras Hryb (CAN)

=== Freestyle (– 90 kg) ===
Rank	Name
1st place, gold medalist(s)	Russell Hellickson (USA)
2nd place, silver medalist(s)	Bárbaro Morgan (CUB)
3rd place, bronze medalist(s)	Raúl García (MEX)

=== Freestyle (– 100 kg) ===
Rank	Name
1st place, gold medalist(s)	Dominic Carollo (USA)
2nd place, silver medalist(s)	Francisco Lonchan (CUB)
3rd place, bronze medalist(s)	Daniel Vernik (ARG)

=== Freestyle (+ 100 kg) ===
Rank	Name
1st place, gold medalist(s)	Jeff Smith (USA)
2nd place, silver medalist(s)	Félix Fonseca (CUB)
3rd place, bronze medalist(s)	Miguel Zambrano (PER)

== Medal table ==
Rank	Nation	Gold	Silver	Bronze	Total
1	United States	7	2	0	9
2	Cuba	3	7	0	10
3	Mexico	0	1	1	2
4	Argentina	0	0	3	3
5	Canada	0	0	2	2
5	Panama	0	0	2	2
7	Peru	0	0	1	1
7	Venezuela	0	0	1	1
Totals (8 entries)		10	10	10	30

== See also ==
- Wrestling at the 1972 Summer Olympics
