= Kazakh wrestling =

A pictogram of Kazakh wrestling, illustrating the upright stance required of competitors.

Kazakh wrestling, or Kuresi (Kazakh: Qazaq Kuresi or Қазақ күресі), is a traditional combat sport in which two athletes wrestle from a standing position, attempting to force both of their opponent's shoulders to touch the ground simultaneously. It is regarded as a form of martial art with origins among the nomadic peoples of Kazakhstan, where it historically served as both combat training and a form of entertainment.

== History ==
The earliest rock paintings in Kazakhstan depicting wrestling have been dated to 1200–600 BC. Kazakh wrestling was incorporated into military training, serving three documented purposes:

1. Training soldiers in balance while handling a chariot.
2. Serving a ritualistic function within religious practices.
3. Training soldiers in close combat, enabling them to unbalance or throw an opponent while maintaining their own footing.

The first modern Kazakh wrestling competition was held in the Soviet Union in 1938, at a sports festival in Almaty, then the capital of the Kazakh Soviet Socialist Republic. The first international tournament took place in 1952, with participation limited to Asian competitors. Following Kazakhstan's independence from the Soviet Union in 1991, national championships and leagues have been held annually.

In 2004, the International Kazakh Wrestling Federation (IKWF) was established at the World Congress in Berlin, with Serik Tukiev elected as its first president.

In November 2005, the first Asian Championship in Kazakh wrestling was held in Altai Krai, Russia. The event was named in honor of then-president of Kazakhstan Nursultan Nazarbayev, and drew more than 100 athletes from 25 countries, including Germany, Turkey, the Netherlands, and France. In July 2011, the second Asian Championship was held in Mongolia.

== Techniques ==
The techniques used in Kazakh wrestling share structural similarities with those of Judo and Mongolian wrestling, particularly in their emphasis on throws and balance disruption.

== Rules ==
Victory is achieved when an opponent is thrown flat on their back. Points are also awarded for throwing the opponent onto their side or forcing them to a knee. Wrestlers must attack above the belt and are prohibited from targeting the opponent's legs.

=== Competitions ===
Wrestlers are divided by age into three groups and by weight into eight categories. Adult bouts last ten minutes; bouts for teenagers last five. Kazakh wrestling appears in zonal, regional, and national sports festival programs across Kazakhstan.

Before a match, wrestlers place their hands on their chests and bow, then greet their opponent with a hug before stepping back to await the referee's signal.

== See also ==
- Mongolian wrestling
