= Zasuul =

Helper and judge in Mongolian wrestling matches

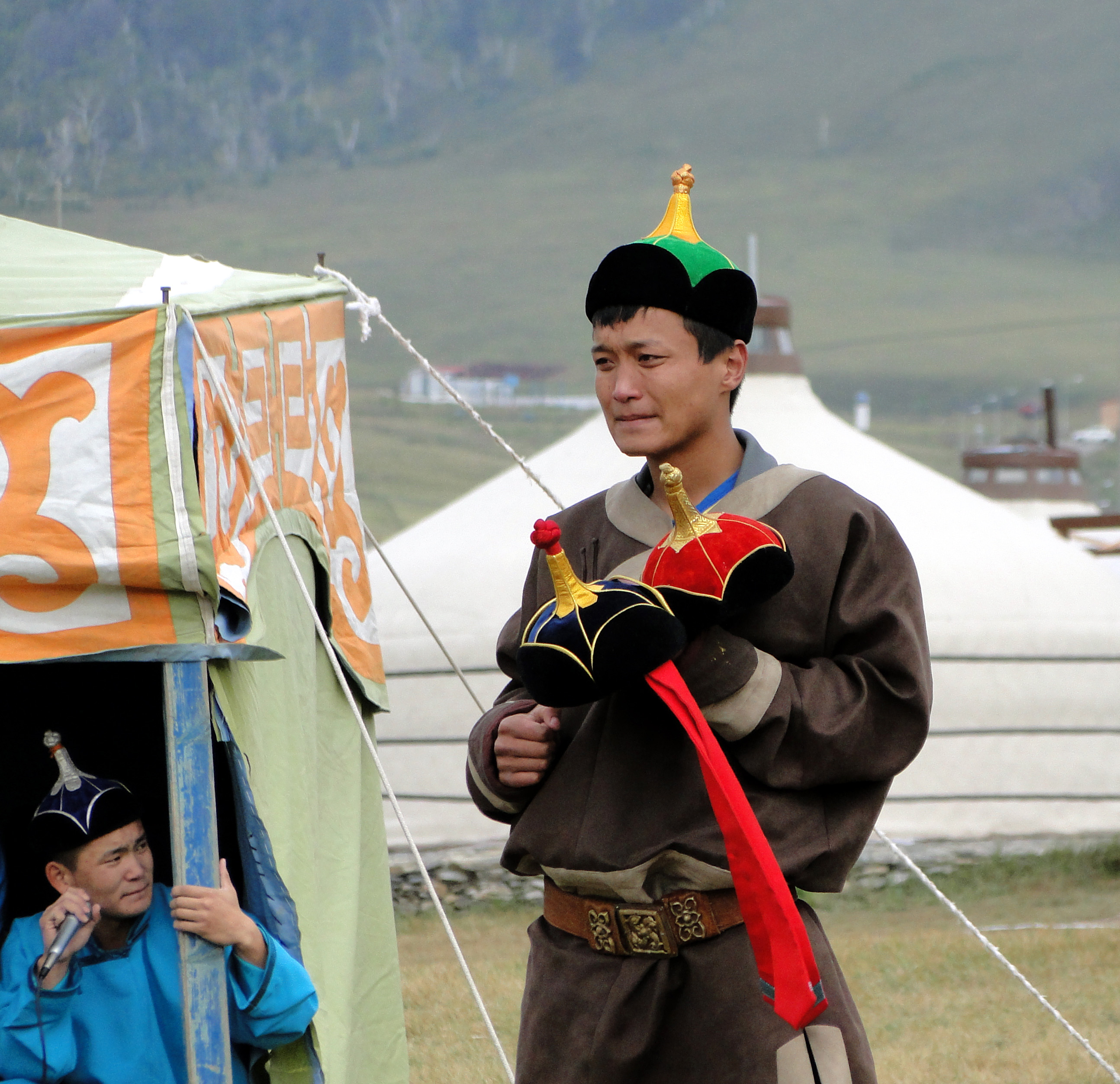
Zasuul, holding hats.

In Mongolian wrestling, the zasuul is a wrestler's helper, also described as a trainer and a second.

== Etymology ==
The name "zasuul" comes from the Mongolian word "zasah" (to fix).

== Practice ==
Since Mongolian wrestling falls are sometimes close and hard to observe because of the techniques involved, their primary role is to impartially decide from a neutral vantage point who fell first.

Two zasuuls are present for each bout. Their job is to analyze the match, to catch illegal moves and promote sportsmanship. They decide which wrestler went down first on a close call and are impartial. If they disagree on who fell first, they sometimes decide to restart, given no video replay.

Ideally, zasuuls are not wrestlers and have no preference on who wins or loses. Sometimes during the heat of the match, they also serve as a third force so the matches go according to the rules.

The zasuul holds the wrestler's hat during the match, and before the third, fifth, and seventh rounds announces the wrestler's titles.

The zasuul also encourages the wrestler and engages the audience. At the beginning of the match he can imitate wild animals in a choreographed dance, and he sings songs to encourage his wrestler.
