= Károly Bajkó =

Hungarian wrestler (1944–1997)

Medal record

Representing Hungary

Men's Freestyle wrestling

Olympic Games
| Bronze medal – third place | 1972 Munich | Light Heavyweight |

Men's Greco-Roman wrestling

Olympic Games
| Bronze medal – third place | 1968 Mexico City | Welterweight |

Károly Bajkó (1 August 1944 – 9 June 1997) was a Hungarian wrestler. He was born in Békés. He was Olympic bronze medalist in Greco-Roman wrestling in 1968, and in Freestyle wrestling in 1972.
