= Shukri Ahmedov =

Bulgarian wrestler

Personal information
- Full name: Shukri Lyutviev Ahmedov
- Nationality: Bulgarian
- Born: 22 November 1951 (age 74) Razgrad, Bulgaria

Sport
- Sport: Wrestling
Medal record
Representing Bulgaria
Summer Universiade
| Gold medal – first place | 1977 Sofia | 90 kg |

Shukri Lyutviev Ahmedov (born 22 November 1951) is a Bulgarian wrestler. He competed in the men's light-heavyweight freestyle at the 1976 Summer Olympics.

He is the son of Olympic silver medalist Lyutvi Ahmedov.
