= Mongolian wrestling =

Folk wrestling style of Mongols

- Үндэсний бөх ᠪᠦᠬᠡ
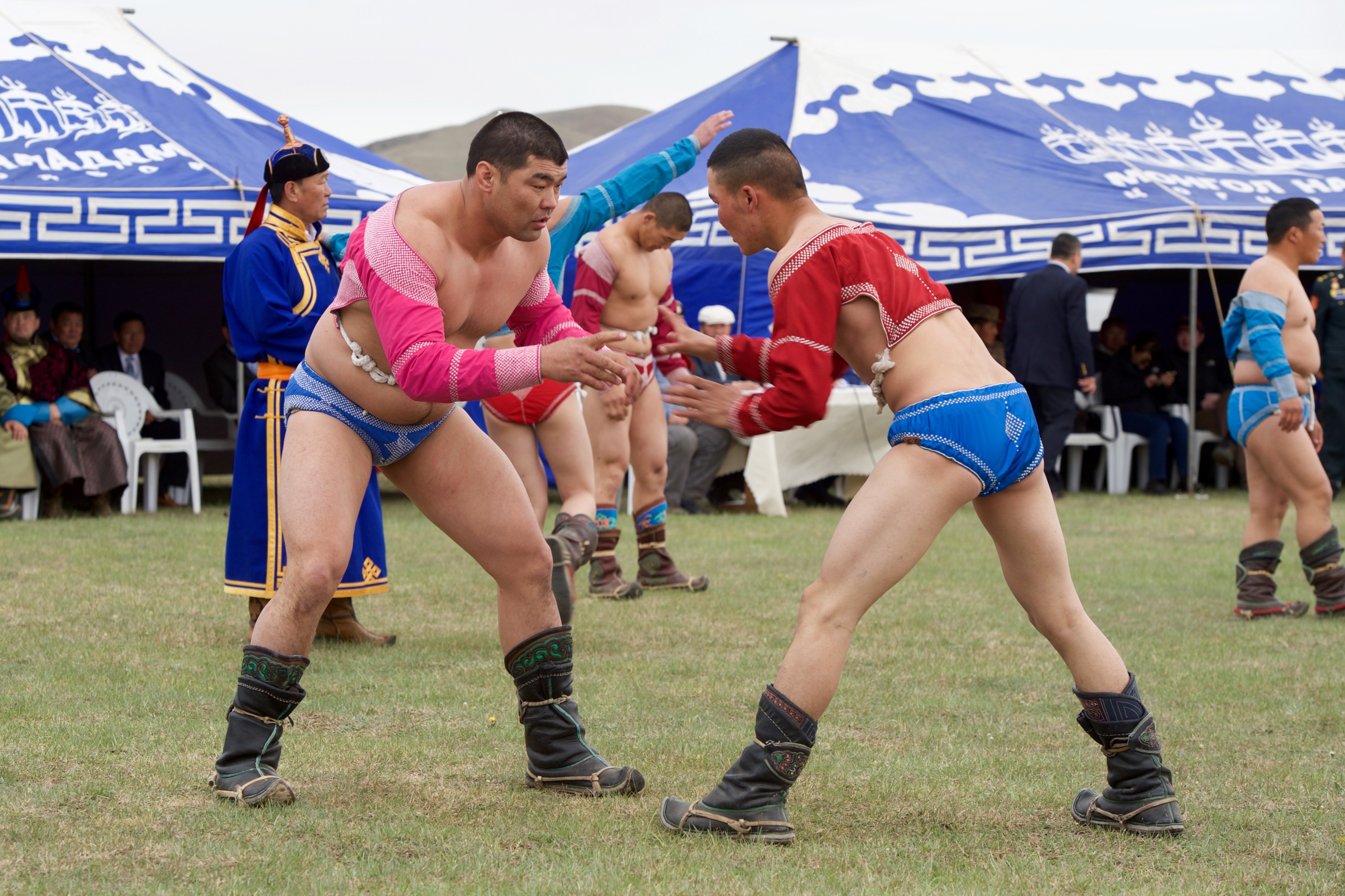
- Mongolian wrestlers during Naadam
- Also known as: Bökh
- Focus: Wrestling
- Hardness: Full contact
- Country of origin: Mongolia
- Olympic sport: No

Mongolian wrestling, known as Bökh (Note: (Mongolian script: ᠪᠥᠬᠡ; Mongolian Cyrillic: Бөх or Үндэсний бөх)), is the folk wrestling style of Mongols in Mongolia, Inner Mongolia, Buryat Mongol regions, Kalmyk Mongol and other regions where touching the ground with anything other than foot or palm of hand loses the match. Bökh means "firmness, reliability, vitality, wrestler", from Mongolic root *bekü "firm, hard, solid; fighter, strong man" Wrestling is the most important of the Mongolian culture's historic "Three Manly Skills", that also include horsemanship and archery.

Genghis Khan considered wrestling to be an important way to keep his army in good physical shape and combat ready. The court of the Qing dynasty (1646–1911) held regular wrestling events, mainly between ethnic Manchu and Mongol wrestlers. There are several different versions, Mongolian, Buryatian (in the Buryatia of Russia), Oirat and Inner Mongolian.

- Mongolian wrestling, Khalkha wrestling (Khalkha bökh) - traditional Khalkha Mongolian wrestling.
- Buryat wrestling (Buriad bökh)
- Bukh noololdoon - Oirat wrestling or Western Mongolian wrestling
- Southern Mongolian wrestling - (Khorchin wrestling) jacket wrestling that wear jacket made of cow leather, long pants with chaps over and boots.
- Khuresh - traditional Tuvan jacket wrestling, in southern Siberia. Influenced by Mongolian wrestling. Khalkha Mongolian and Tuvan wrestlers wear almost the same jacket.

== History ==
Cave paintings in Mongolia’s Bayankhongor Province, dating back to around 7000BC in the Neolithic age, depict two naked men grappling while surrounded by spectators. The art of Bökh appears on bronze plates discovered in the ruins of the Xiongnu empire (206 BC–220 AD). Originally, Bökh was a military sport intended to provide mainly strength, stamina and skills training to troops. Genghis Khan (1206–1227) and the all later Emperors of the Mongol Empire (1206–1368) and also the Emperors of later Khanates were keen to support the sport for this reason so wrestling events were included in local festivals, or Naadam. Wrestling became a key factor when deciding the candidate rankings in imperial martial exams plus outstanding wrestlers were entitled to high distinctions.

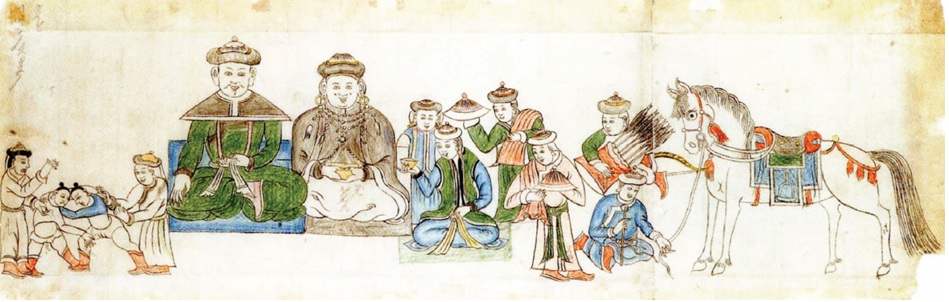
16th century painting of Mongol wrestlers.

The Secret History of the Mongols (written in Mongolian in 1240 AD) in Chapter 4, Paragraph 140 records a wrestling match between Buri the Wrestler and Belgutei that took place in Eastern Mongolia on the Year of the Monkey (1200 AD):

One day Genghis Khan had Buri Bokh and Belgutei wrestle each other. Buri Bokh belonged to the Juchhen tribe. Formerly Buri Bokh was able to hold on to Belgutei by one hand, drop him to the ground by one leg and keep him immobile there on the ground. Buri Bokh was a nationally famous wrestler. However, on this occasion when Buri Bokh and Belgutei were made to wrestle with each other Buri Bokh fell on the ground despite being an undefeated champion. Belgutei managed with great effort to press Buri Bokh down at the shoulder and proceeded to sit on his belt area. He then glanced at Genghis Khan from the corner of his eye. Genghis Khan bit his lower lip. Belgutei understood the meaning of this, held Buri Bokh firmly, jerked him at the chest and buttocks and broke his back. Buri Bokh said with his back broken: "I never lost a match to Belgutei. I fell purposefully to please the Khan out of fear but now I have lost my life." Having said this he died. Belgutei broke his back, dragged him and then left his body. The eldest of the seven sons of Kabul Khan was Okhinbarkhag. The second eldest was Bartanbaatar. Yesukhei Baatar (father of Genghis Khan) was his son. The third son (of Kabul Khan) was Khutugt Monkhor. Buri Bokh was his son. Whenever Buri Bokh wrestled he far outperformed the sons of Bartanbaatar. He was close friends with the brave sons of Barkhag. This was how the national wrestling champion Buri had his back broken by Belgutei.

19th-century painting of Kalmyk wrestling preserved at the State Russian Museum, St. Petersburg

Axel Heikel of the Finnish expedition to Mongolia wrote about a wrestling competition the expedition witnessed during their ten-day stay in Urga (now Ulaanbaatar, capital of Mongolia) from 27 July until 7 August 1891

"Now there took place an entire week of wrestling between Mongolian athletes. The location was an open public square in front of a temple in the middle of the city. Thousands of spectators had gathered all around. These were kept in order by police agents. Ladies of high rank were jostling their way through the midst of the crowd. Only one side of the square was reserved for the lamas, who were dressed in shiny robes of red and yellow and sat with their legs crossed in long rows on both sides of a baldachin, under which was enthroned on an altar the "Gegen", that is to say, the "God-Man" sent from Tibet. In front of the throne stood two attendants with ceremonial tiger-skins slung over their shoulders. The champions advanced two at a time, coming out from opposite sides of the square, accompanied by their seconds. They had their chests, legs and arms exposed and advanced doing most comic dances, certainly to ensure the elasticity of their muscles during the last minute. As soon as one of the wrestlers touched the ground, no matter how lightly, he was judged the loser of the bout. Then the victor proceeded to leap his way forward and prostrated himself before the god, offering his thanks for the victory. After that he went to the judges to have his name written down, in order to fight the next day with another opponent who had equally brought down his own opponent that same day. The prizes given to the final "invincibles" consisted of goats and sheep etc. Ten days later there was to take place a horse race in a steppe close to Urga, wherein a thousand racers would participate, but we couldn't wait until then. These kinds of national festivals, which one could call the Mongolian Olympics, take place every year, but the ones which take place every three years seem to be the most impressive."

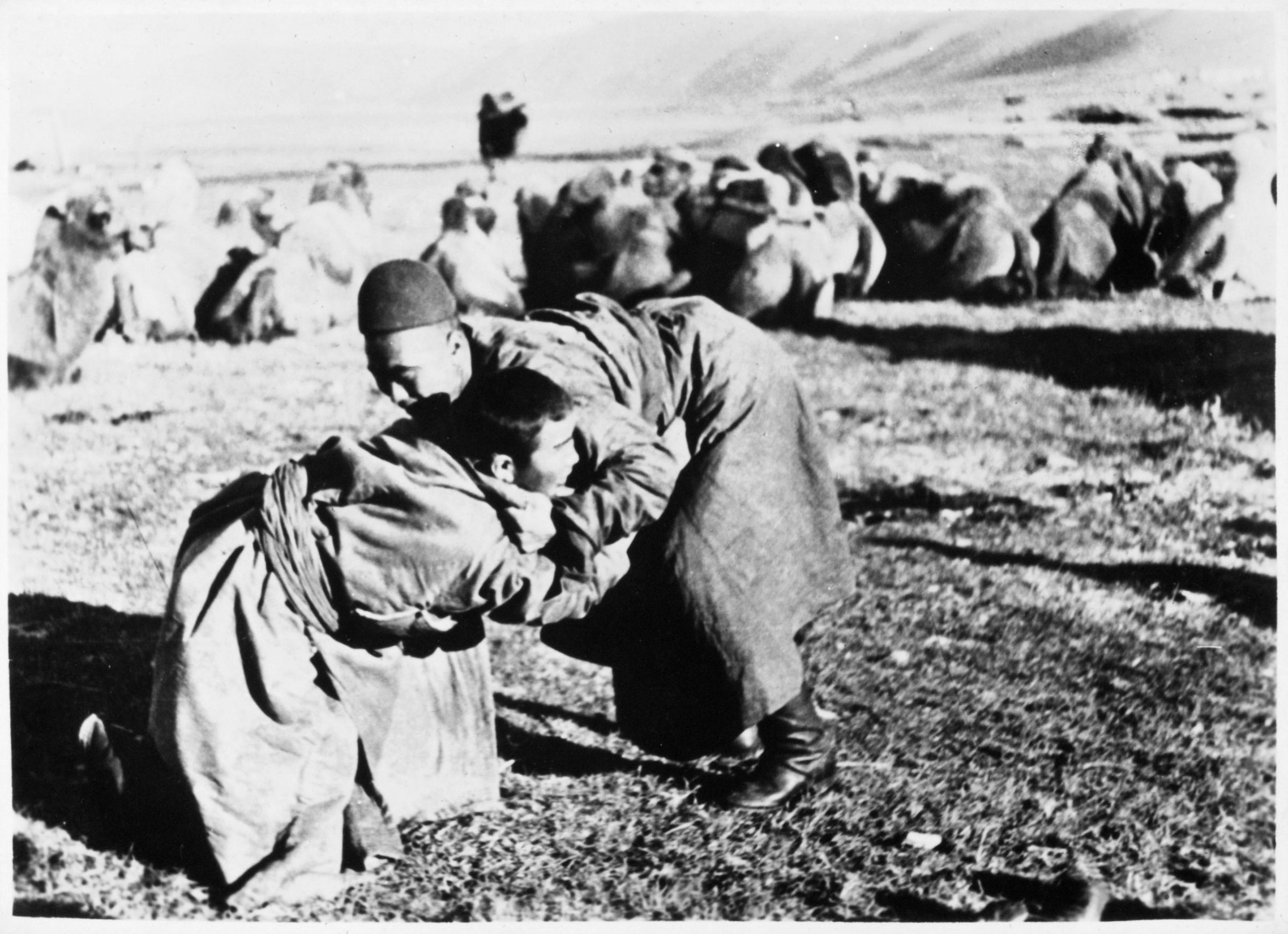
Mongol wrestlers in Inner Mongolia, circa 1936

As can be seen from this text the Urga games (1778–1924) took place at the old central square which would have been located just to the north of present-day Sükhbaatar Square. The square can be seen on pre-revolutionary paintings of Urga. A 1967 Mongolian painting shows an old Urga wrestling match in detail, with the wrestlers wearing the same "Zodog" and "Shuudag" as they do in the present-day games (1924–present). The avarga (Titan) Jambyn Sharavjamts (born 1876) was a famous champion who gained recognition starting from when he was 18 years old and continued to compete with extraordinary success in state Naadams during the Qing dynasty period (until 1911), the Bogd Khan period (1911–1924) and the People's Republic of Mongolia (1924–1990). Sharavjamts was invited to take part in the state Naadam of 1945 (footage still exists) and succeeded in defeating three wrestlers at the age of nearly 70. He retired from wrestling in 1951, during the 30th anniversary of the People's Revolution with many decorations and medals including the Labor Achievement medal.

On 17 September 2011 the Mongolian National Wrestling Match was held with the attendance of 6002 wrestlers. Thus, it has become the largest wrestling competition in the world and is recorded in the Guinness Record Book.

== Competitions ==
Mongolian wrestling is the most popular national sport and a vital cultural piece for all Mongols around the world. When a male child is born in a family, Mongols wish him to become a wrestler. There are many competitions that take place each year in Mongolia, west and south-eastern Russia and northern China. The biggest one is the National Naadam festival, takes place in Mongolia between up to 1024 wrestlers.

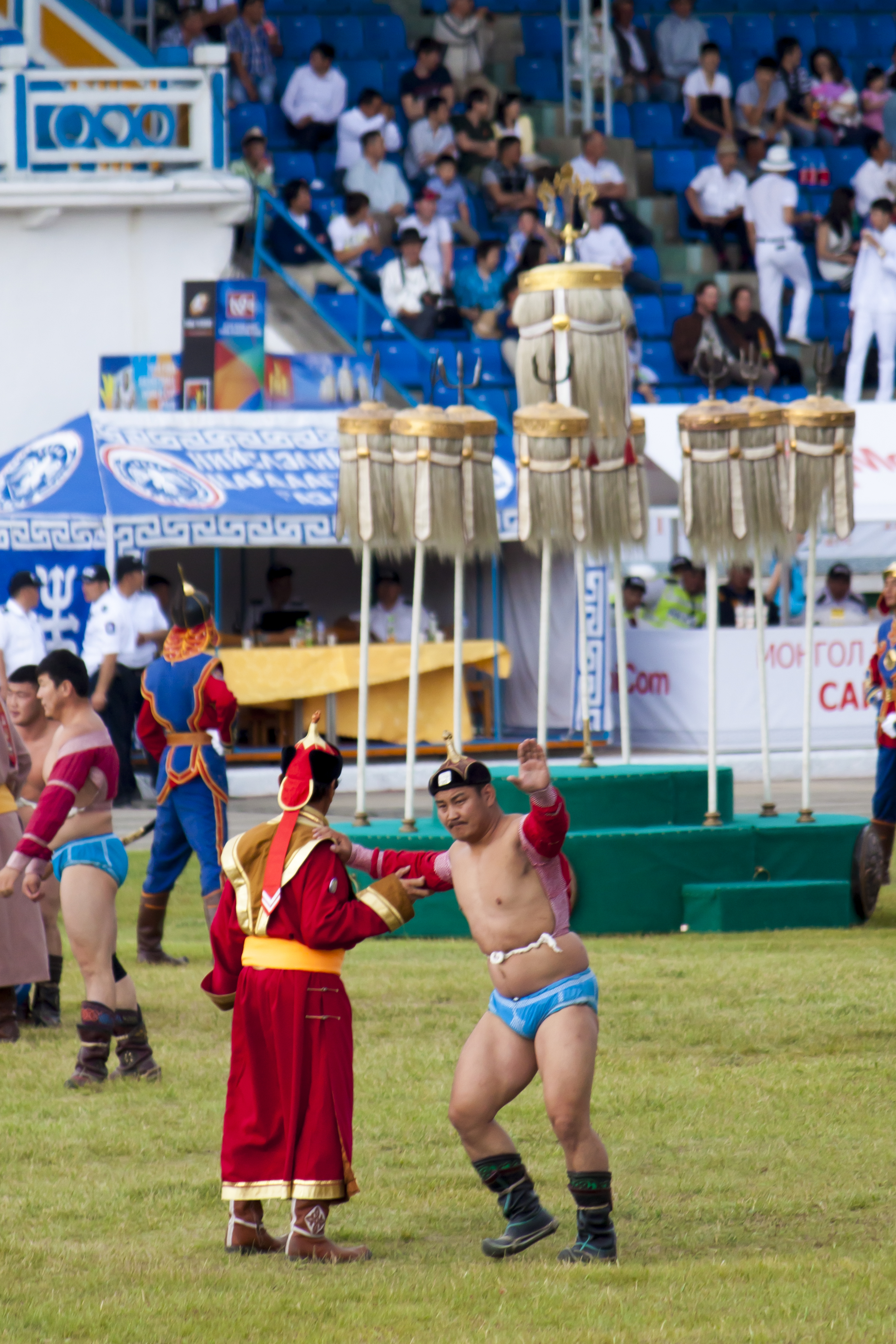
National Naadam Wrestling in Ulaanbaatar, Mongolia, July 2014

=== Mongolian National Naadam ===
In Mongolia, the Naadam ('Game' in English) takes place in July each year. The biggest competition is the National Naadam competition in Ulaanbaatar, which has the largest number of wrestlers and live radio and television broadcasts throughout the country, with overseas streaming, enabling the reach to go beyond to countries all over the globe. Naadam is divided into three classes based on the Mongolian administrative divisions.

Level	Name	Place	Date	Participating wrestlers
1st	National Naadam Wrestling	Ulaanbaatar	July, 11-13	512 wrestlers, 1024 in big anniversary year
2nd	Aimag (provincial) Naadam Wrestling	Each 21 Aimag	approximately July, 8-10 or middle July	128 or 256 wrestlers
3rd	Sum (district) Naadam Wrestling	Each 329 Sum	early July	32 or 64 wrestlers

For the Naadam in Ulaanbaatar, the matches are held in at the National Sports Stadium, while in the countryside for smaller scale Naadams the matches are generally held in a small stadium or on an open grassy field; however, they can also occur on a soft dirt area not littered with gravel. Since there are no weight classes in the Naadam of Mongolia, a small wrestler can compete against an opponent over twice his size. Smallest wrestlers usually weigh around 70 kg, while the biggest are over 160 kg. The median weight of a competitor at the Naadam is around 115 kg.

Traditionally, the wrestlers are not randomly matched. The host of the Naadam has the privilege to arrange these matches and would often lend their favorites an advantage. Sometimes such arrangements would result in serious disputes between hosts and visiting wrestlers. Although the modern wrestling codes since 1980 stipulate that a lot drawing method be used, this is usually only done at major cross-regional Naadams and championship matches. At the grassroots level, the traditional system is still used.

Rank can only be attained during the Naadam festival. The number of rounds won by each wrestler determines rank. The lowest rank is the Falcon of Sum, given to the top four wrestlers at the soum level Naadam in any 329 sums of Mongolia. Highest rank is "Champion". The rank is held for life.

Level		Title	Mongolian	Provision
1	National	State Grand Champion	Улсын дархан аварга	Win 4 times or more in National Naadam Wrestling
2	National	State Wide Champion	Улсын даян аварга	Win 3 times in National Naadam Wrestling
3	National	State Champion	Улсын аварга	Win 2 times in National Naadam Wrestling or win once in National Naadam Wrestling at the tournament with 10 rounds
4	National	State Lion	Улсын арслан	Win in National Naadam Wrestling
5	National	State Garuda	Улсын гарьд	Runner-Up in National Naadam Wrestling
6	National	State Elephant	Улсын заан	Semi-final in National Naadam Wrestling
7	National	State Hawk	Улсын харцага	Quarter final in National Naadam Wrestling
8	National	State Falcon	Улсын начин	1/8 final in National Naadam Wrestling
9	Aimag	Lion of Aimag	Аймгийн арслан	Win in Aimag Naadam Wrestling
10	Aimag	Elephant of Aimag	Аймгийн заан	Runner-Up in Aimag Naadam Wrestling
11	Aimag	Falcon of Aimag	Аймгийн начин	Semi-final in Aimag Naadam Wrestling
12	Sum	Elephant of Sum	Сумын заан	Win in Sum Naadam Wrestling
13	Sum	Falcon of Sum	Сумын начин	Semi-final in Sum Naadam Wrestling

If a wrestler secures five or more wins in a Naadam but doesn't surpass their previous record, they are honored with a title (Mongolian: чимэг) instead of being promoted. For instance, if a State Hawk wins six matches in a State Naadam for the first time (having previously won six times to attain the State Hawk rank at a lower rank), they are honored with the title of Unen Zorigt, which translates to "truly brave", and assume the designation of Unen Zorigt State Hawk (Mongolian: Үнэн Зоригт Харцага).

=== Danshig Naadam ===
Danshig Naadams are smaller scale tournaments than the national naadam, usually with 256 or 128 competitors, organized once in a year or so in countrysides to celebrate specific anniversaries of provinces or historic locations. It is unique a type of naadam and smaller in scale than the most provincial tournaments. For example, the western region danshig, Khangai region danshig, Gobi region danshig, eastern region danshig naadams are organized every two years.

=== Altargana Naadam ===
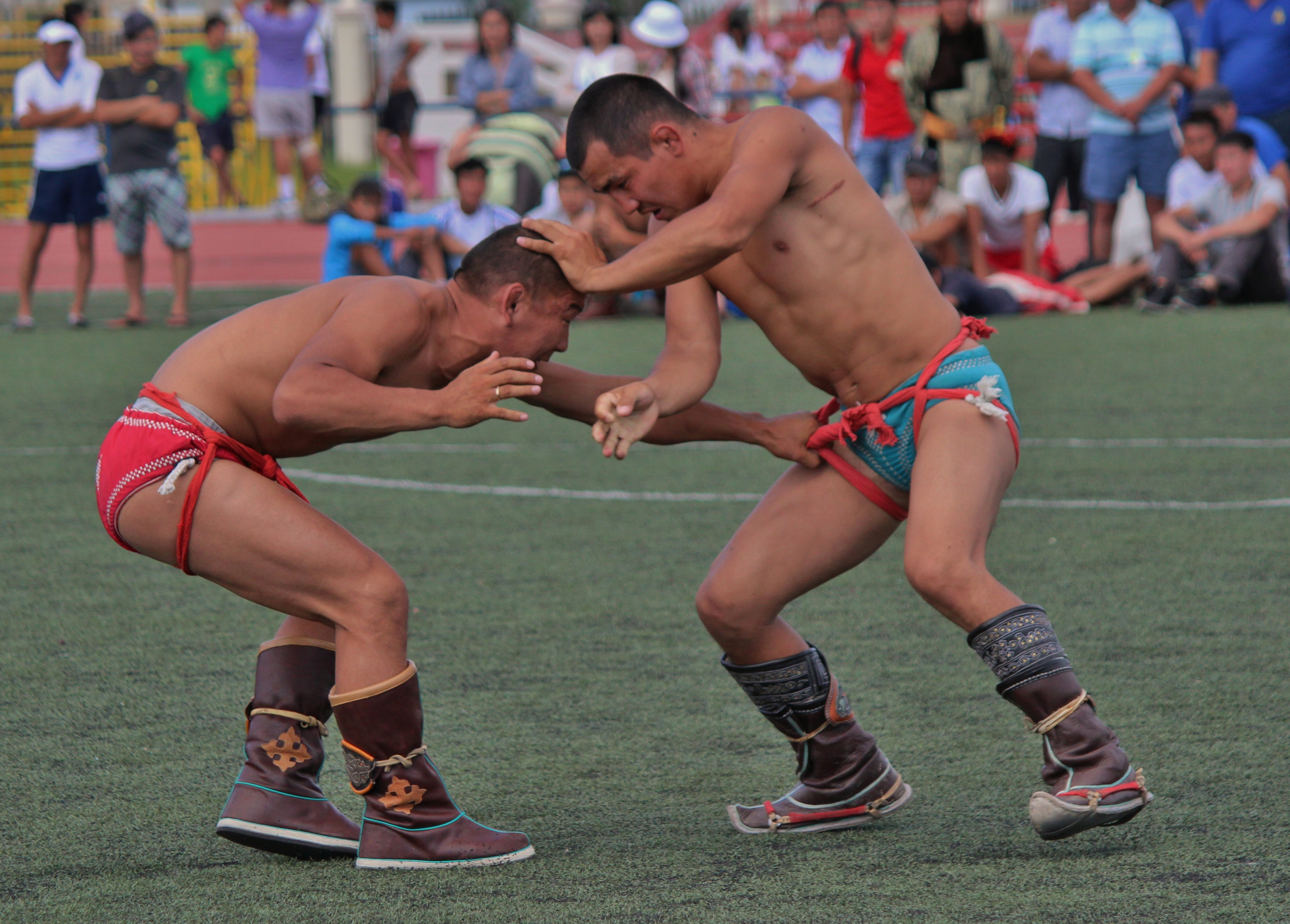
Buryat wrestlers at Altargana Naadam in Zabaykalsky Krai, July 2012

Buryat Mongols also celebrate their own Naadam each year with their own wrestling style. Competitors come from different regions of Mongolia that has significant Buryat populations such as Dornod, Khentii, Selenge, Bulgan, Orkhon, also from Buryatia of Russia and from Inner Mongolia of China.

In 2010, the festival took place in late July in Ulaanbaatar, Mongolia. Wrestlers competed in two weight divisions -75 kg and +75 kg. For the lighter weight, B.Batozhargal of Buryatia got the title out of 32 wrestlers and for the heavier division D.Tsogzoldorj of Mongolia (who has the National Nachin rank) got his third title in row for the past three years.

=== All ethnic Mongol Wrestling Tournament ===
Since 2009, the associations of Mongol wrestling in Mongolia, Russia and China have started Mongol Wrestling Tournament between all ethnic Mongols. The International Mongol Bukh Federation (IMongolBökhF) is a non-profit organization that provides international standards and guidelines for the development of Mongol bukh for all over the world. The president of AEMWF is Inner Mongolian businessman Buhee Juramt; and the Mongolian sumo wrestler, 68th yokozuna Asashoryu D. Dagvadorj is honorary president of AEMWF.

Participants come from Mongolia, Tuva of Russia, Buryatia of Russia, Kalmyk of Russia, Altai of Russia, Inner Mongolia of China and Xinjiang of China to compete with each other in Khalkha Wrestling style. The first ever championship was held in Ulaanbaatar, Mongolia in April 2009, where Chimedregzengiin Sanjaadamba, who has not gotten yet a nation title, won the tournament. In August 2009, it was held in Xiliinhot, Inner Mongolia, and again Sanjaadamba won the championship, while still without a national title.

The 2010 competition took place on 15–17 July at Ulan-Ude in Buryatia, Russia. This time, two weight categories have been created: -75 kg and +75 kg. In -75 kg division, about 45 wrestlers have competed and at the 5th round top four were: Ivan Garmaev (Buryatia), Kh. Munkhbayar (Mongolia), M. Batmunkh (Mongolia), Syldys Mongush (Tuva). Eventually Syldys Mongush got the title on the 6th round through Kh. Munkhbayar. For the +75 kg division, there were about the same number of competitors as in the lighter division. The top two were Ch. Sanjaadamba (Lion of the Army) and D. Ragchaa (Elephant of the Nation). And again Sanjaadamba got the title, who lost in the third round of this year's Naadam in Mongolia, where he failed to get a national-level title.

The fourth all ethnic Mongols' wrestling tournament held in 2011 was organized in Tuva republic, Russia, where ulsin khartsaga (State Falcon) A. Byambajav was declared as the winner.

The fifth all ethnic Mongols' tournament was held at the Mongolian National Circus, Ulaanbaatar, Mongolia on November 4, 2012, that aimed to introduce and promote Mongolian traditional wrestling for its consecutive fourth year. In the 5th all ethnic Mongols' wrestling tournament, ulsiin zaan (State Elephant) Ch. Sanjaadamba won the tournament in +85 kg weight category, where ulsin nachin (State Falcon) Erdenebileg Enkhbat was runner-up. In the -85 kg category, a Bulgan aimag resident, aimagiin arslan (Aimag Lion) Delgersaikhan Amarsaikhan took the first place; followed by an Uvurkhangai resident wrestler, the aimgiin arslan (Aimag Falcon) Orgodol Tumendemberel. The winners of each category were awarded with 7 million MNT, runner-ups with 4 million MNT, and the third and fourth place wrestlers were granted 1.5 million MNT respectively.

=== Other tournaments ===
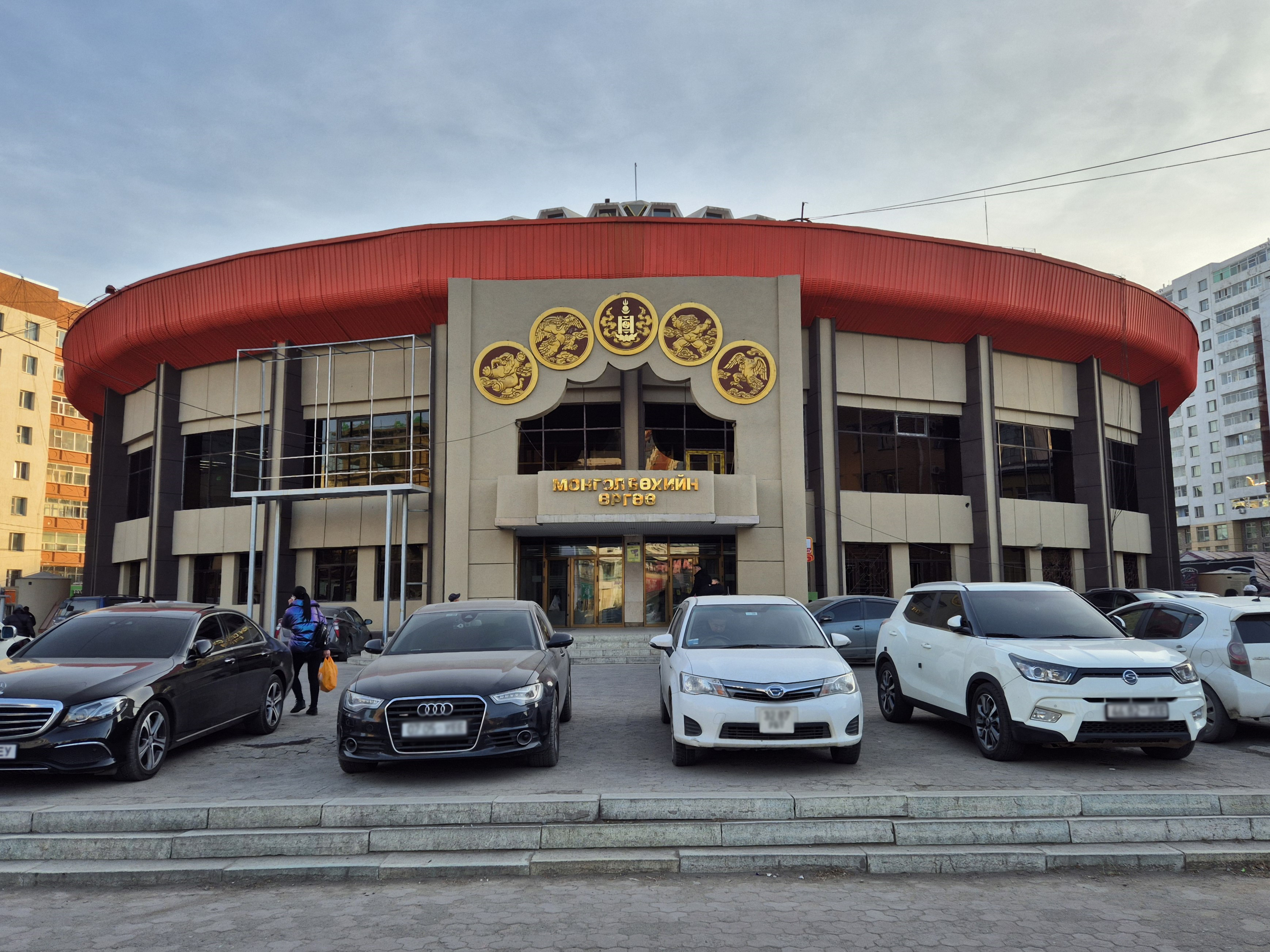
Bökhiin Örgöö (lit. Wrestler's Palace), main arena of the Mongolian wrestling in Ulaanbaatar, Mongolia

Each year during the Lunar New year holiday of Mongolia, 256 wrestlers compete during the winter at the Wrestling Palace in Ulaanbaatar. No rank is given at this competition, but it is considered the second most important tournament after the Naadam of Mongolia. Winners of this New Year's tournament are often considered likely to win the summer Naadam.

Best wrestlers from each 21 aimag of Mongolia hold an annual team wrestling competition. Often teams from Khangai region and north western region (Arkhangai, Övörkhangai and Uvs) win the title, but for the 2010 competition the team from Govi-Altai aimag took the title.

There are also smaller scale tournaments throughout the year that take place at the Wrestling Palace in Ulaanbaatar, usually in October, November, May and June with 64 or 128 wrestlers.

Government organizations or sometimes even big companies also host smaller scale competitions between 32 and 64 wrestlers to celebrate special occasions.

== Match rules ==
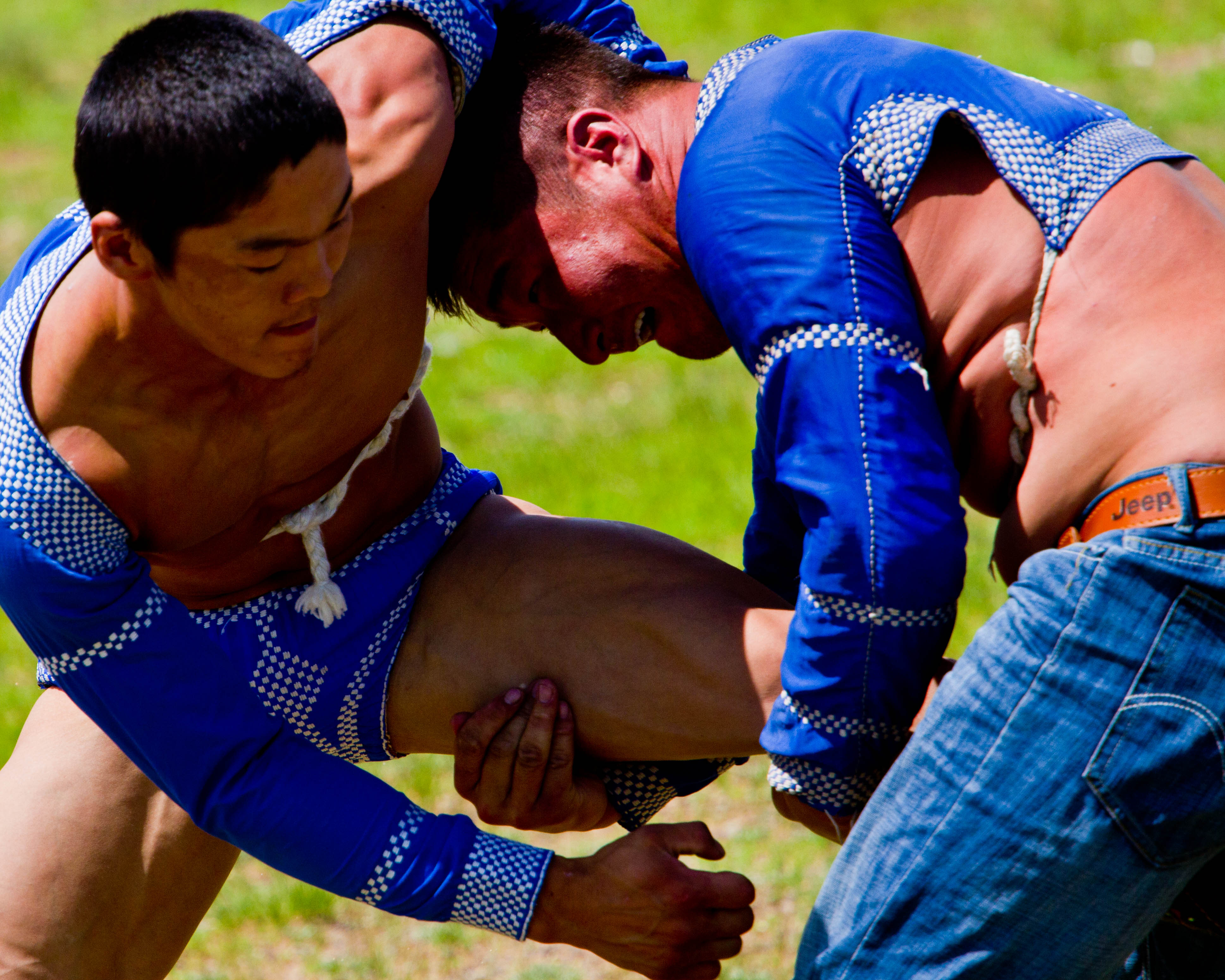
Mongolian wrestling match, July 2011

The goal of a match is to get your opponent to touch his upper body, knee or elbow to the ground. In the Inner Mongolian version, any body part other than the feet touching the ground signals defeat. There are no weight classes, age limits, or time limits in a match. Especially in Naadam, although there are no time limits for a bout, it is generally understood that a match shouldn't take a very long time, especially in the lower rounds. For example, it used to take more than an hour or two for a bout to finish, especially in the higher rounds with each wrestler trying to get feel of the other. This lately resulted in a policy that allows the zasuuls of the wrestlers to set up fair grip positions between the wrestlers to finish the bout faster if the match is moving slowly. Each wrestler wrestles once per round with the winner moving on the next round and the loser being eliminated from the competition.

The technical rules between the Mongolian version and what is found in Inner Mongolia have some divergence. In both versions a variety of throws, trips and lifts are employed to topple the opponent. The Inner Mongolians may not touch their opponent's legs with their hands, whereas, in Mongolia, grabbing your opponent's legs is legal. In addition, striking, choking or locking is illegal in both varieties.

=== Zasuul ===
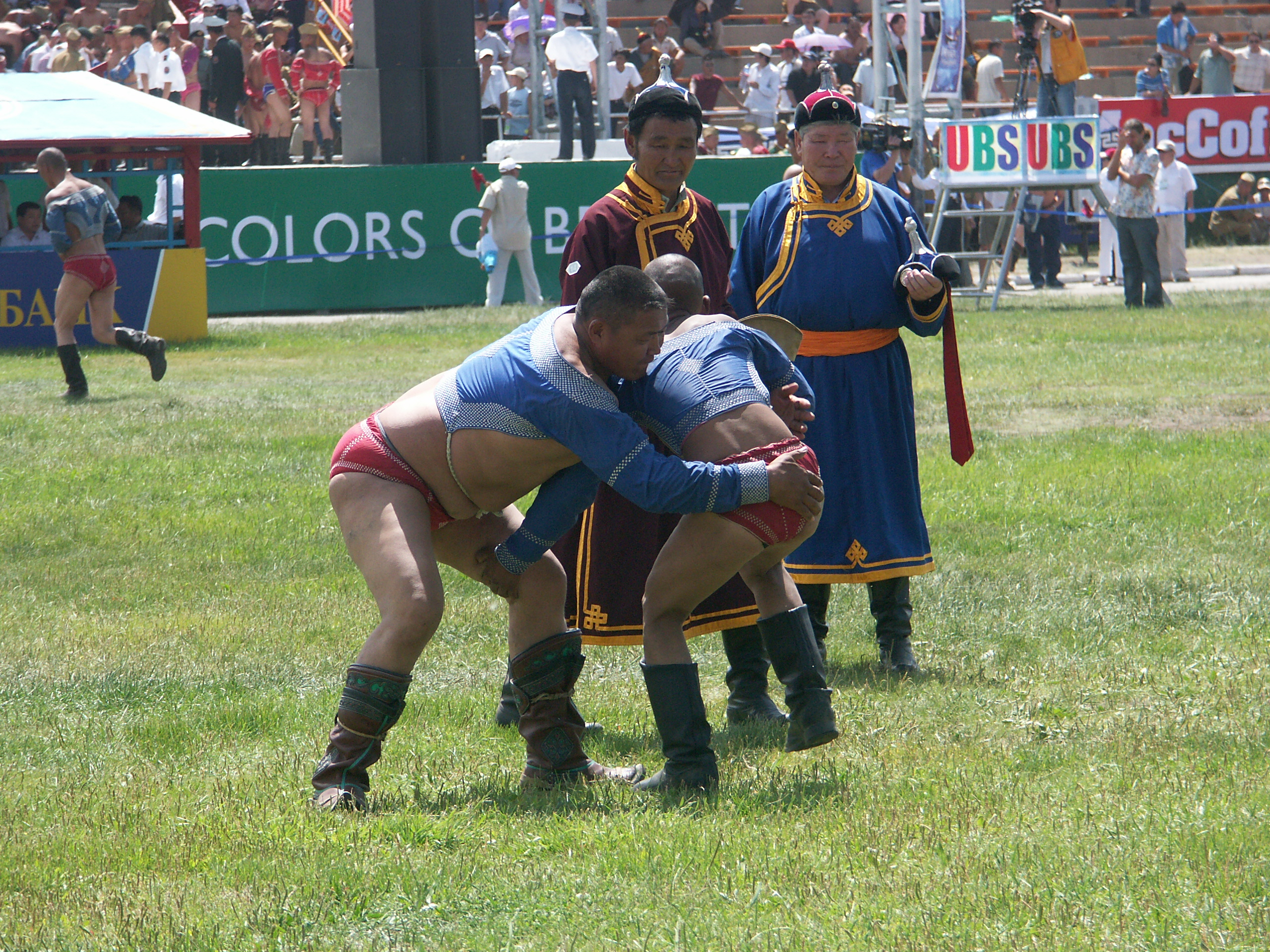
A common Mongolian wrestling match with "zasuul" of each wrestler looking on

The Zasuul (literally meaning a "fixer") of the wrestler is an on-field guide and coach of the wrestler. In lower round competitions when there are many wrestlers, most wrestlers don't have their own zasuuls. Successful wrestlers and those that get to the higher rounds get their own zasuuls. A Zasuuls' role is to hold the hat of his wrestler while he wrestles and give him encouragement and motivation on the field. For instance, if the match is going slowly, a zasuul might slap the buttocks of his wrestler to encourage him to engage his opponent faster. Zasuuls are not technically coaches in the literal sense. They are usually an elder and a friend of the wrestler who is there on the field to serve as a guide and help set up a fair competition. Also, unlike other grappling sports, a Zasuul does not have to be a former wrestler. When the match starts, the wrestlers are divided about evenly into left and right sides, and sometimes a zasuul will sing a praise of his wrestler to open a challenge from that side in the higher rounds, and the other side's zasuul will also respond with his own praise of his wrestler. The poetic praise of a wrestler by his zasuul comes from the wrestler with the highest rank on that side.

=== Starting the match ===
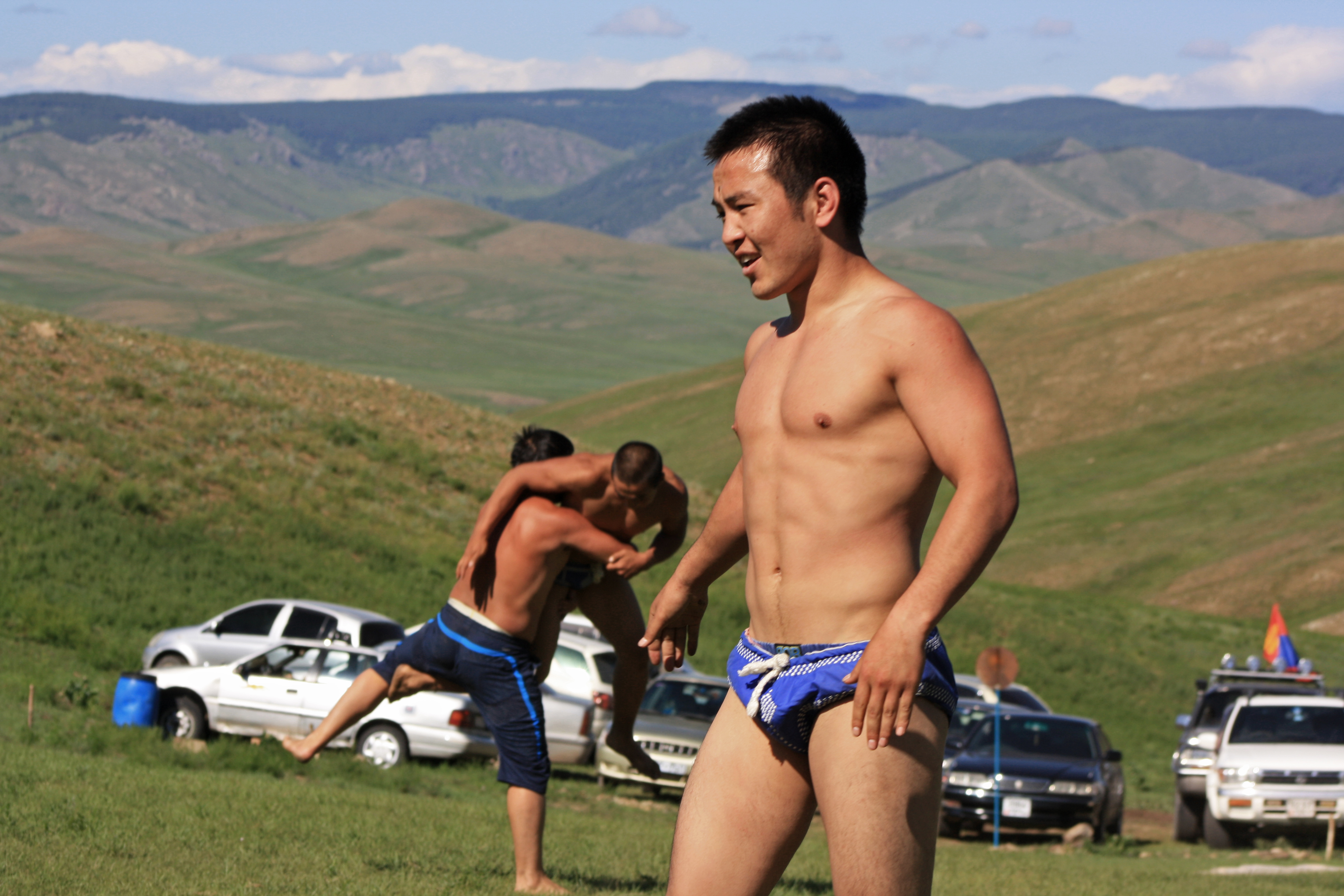
Mongolian wrestler and lift off

Ordos, Alagshaa/Shalbur and Oirat wrestlers begin a match locked together, while the Üzemchin, Khalkha and Hulunbuir styles start a bout without physical contact.

=== Leg contact ===
The Üzemchin and Hulunbuir styles permit no moves between the legs and hands, whereas the Khalkha variant not only allows but requires grabbing the opponent's legs.

=== Kicking ===
A Hulunbuir wrestler may kick his opponent directly in the legs but that technique is not sanctioned by the other styles and is banned in the official code.

=== Falls ===
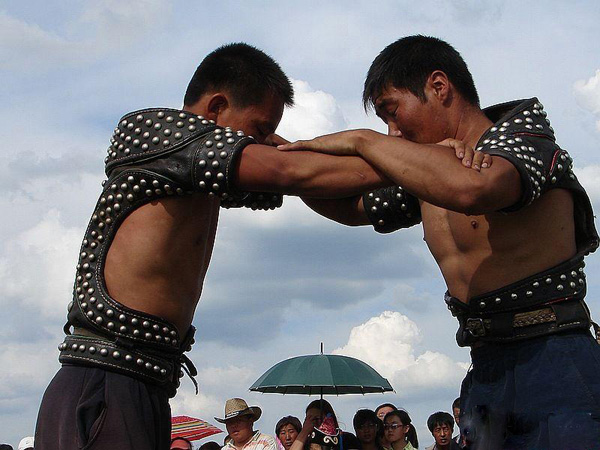
Two Daur men wrestling in Inner Mongolia

Definitions of a "fall" varies between regions:

The Oirats in Xinjiang defines a fall as being when the shoulder blades touch the ground, which is similarly to the Turkish and International freestyle wrestling rules. The Inner Mongol style, shared by Hulunbuir, Ordos and Alagshaa/Shalbur styles, considers a fall to have occurred as soon as any part of the body above the knee (or ankle) touches the ground. The Halh variant, however, allows a hand to touch the ground without losing a bout.

== Training ==
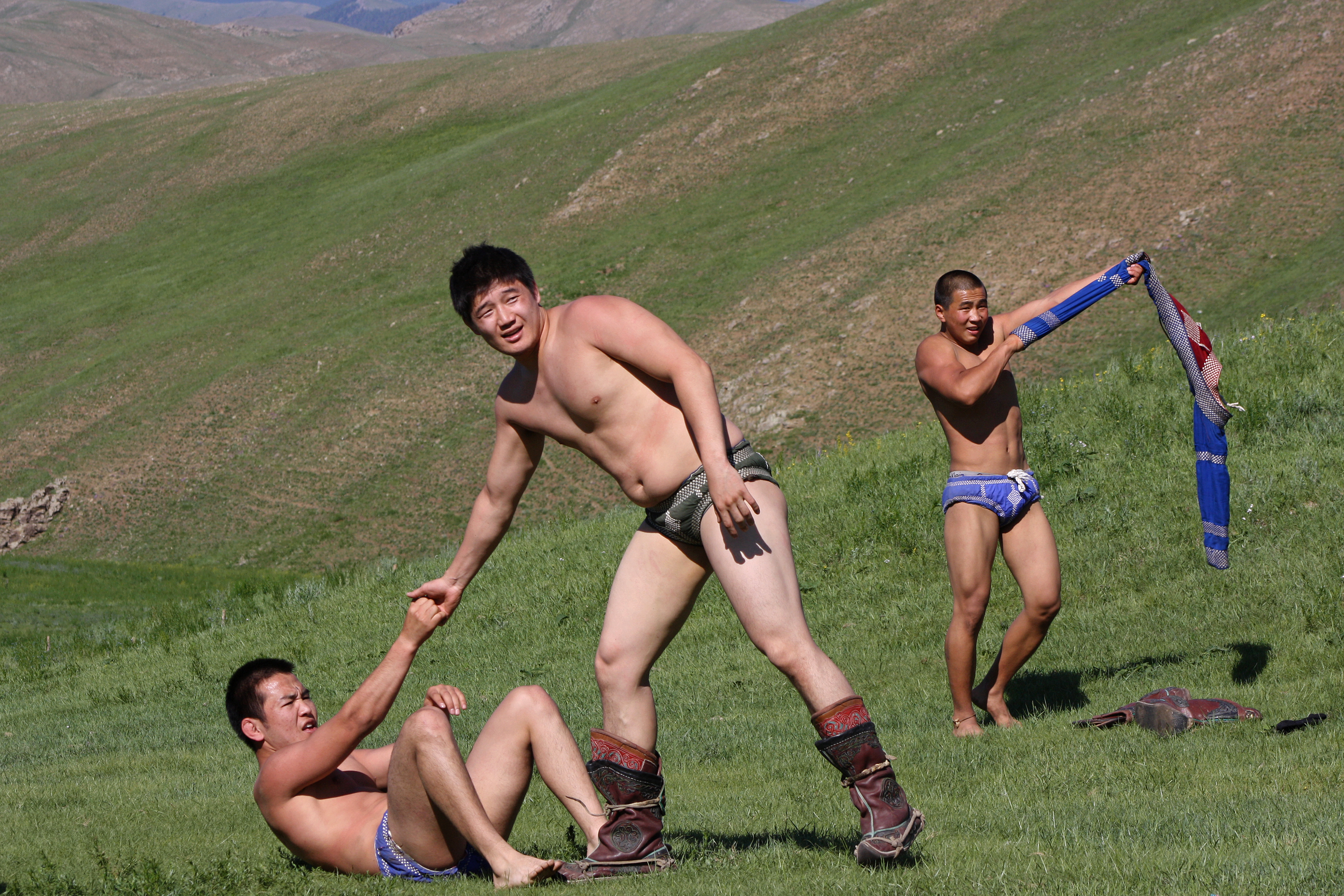
Mongolian wrestlers training in 2011

In preparation for the summer Naadam festivals, most of the wrestlers usually go to a training camp in the countryside where they set up their yurts (Ger) or visit a family that they trained in their spot for years. All the higher ranked wrestlers usually separate out into their own individual camps that they host and lower ranked wrestlers and prospects usually join their camps to learn, observe and train over the course of the summer to get ready for the games.

== Match courtesy ==
Mongolian wrestling also has certain codes of conduct that concern more with good sportsmanship. For example, when a wrestler's clothes get loose or entangled, his opponent is expected to stop attacking and help the former to re-arrange them—even though it might mean giving up a good winning opportunity. Also, when one contestant throws the other to the ground, he is supposed to help the latter get back on his feet, before he dances his way out of the field. After a bout one of the wrestlers go under the other's arm to formally conclude the match. Whether winning or losing, good manners dictate that the two opponents shake hands and salute each other and the audience, both prior to and after a bout.

== Outfit ==
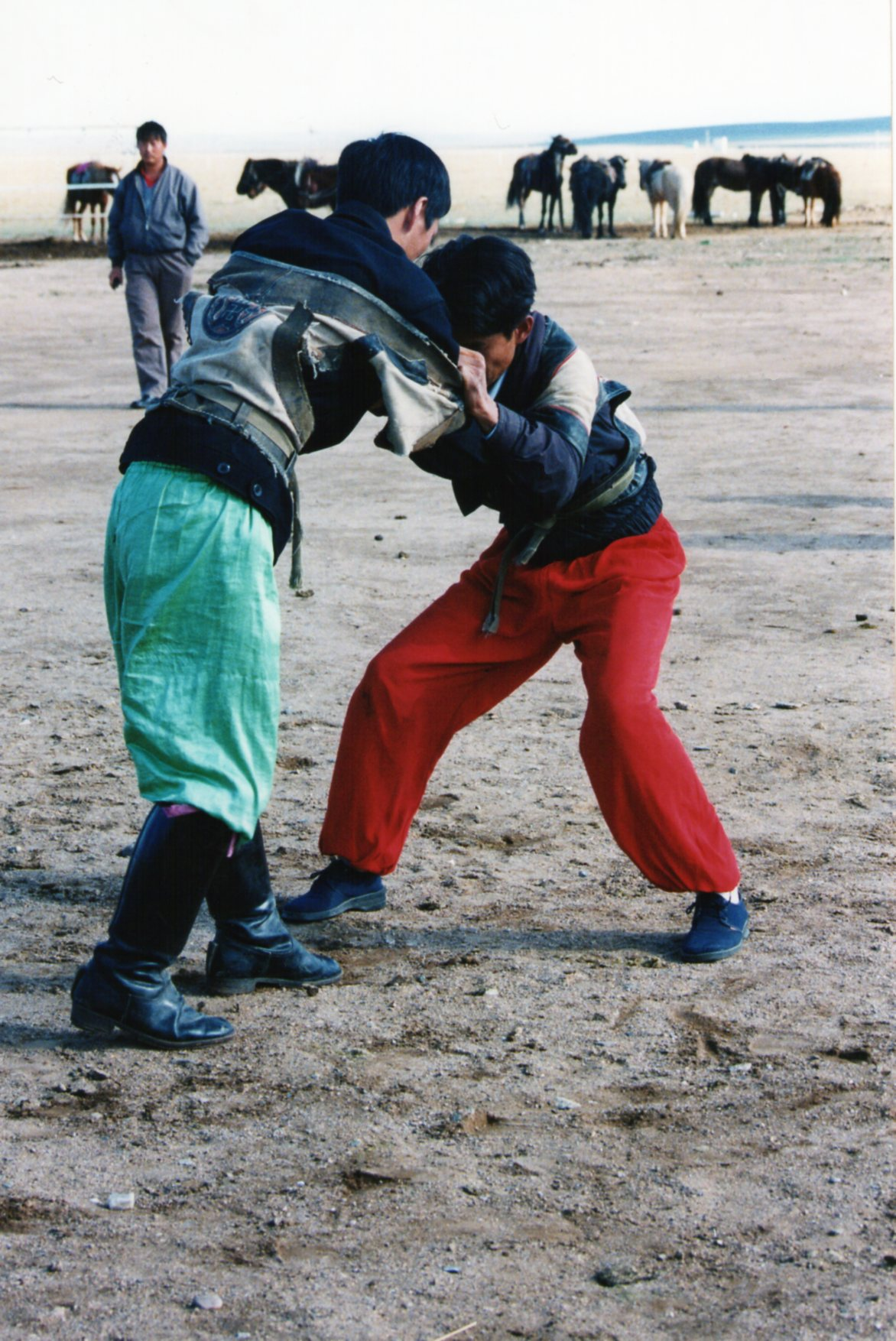
In October, teenage wrestlers in Inner Mongolia wear more clothes than in summer, 2001.

The outfit of the wrestler has been developed over the ages to reflect simplicity and mobility. The standard gear of a wrestler includes:

=== Zodog ===
A tight, collarless, heavy-duty short-sleeved jacket of red or blue color. Traditionally made of wool, modern wrestlers have changed to lighter materials such as cotton and silk. It is fastened at the back with a simple knotted string, and the front is cut away, leaving the wrestler's chest exposed. According to legend, on one occasion a wrestler defeated all other combatants and ripped open the zodog to reveal her breasts, showing to all she was a woman. From that day, the zodog had to reveal the wrestler's chest.

=== Shuudag ===
Small, tight-fitting briefs made of red or blue colored cotton cloth. These make the wrestler more mobile. Also, they prevent one's rival from easily taking advantage of long pants or to avoid material to trip upon.

=== Gutal ===
Leather boots, either in traditional style (with slightly upturned toes), or commercial, Western style. The traditional style gutal are often reinforced around the sides with leather strings for the purpose of wrestling.

Inner Mongolian wrestlers may also wear a jangga, a necklace decorated with strands of colorful silk ribbons. It is awarded to those who have gained considerable renown through contests.

== Dance ==
One of the defining features of bökh is a dance wrestlers perform as they enter the contest field and exiting at the end.

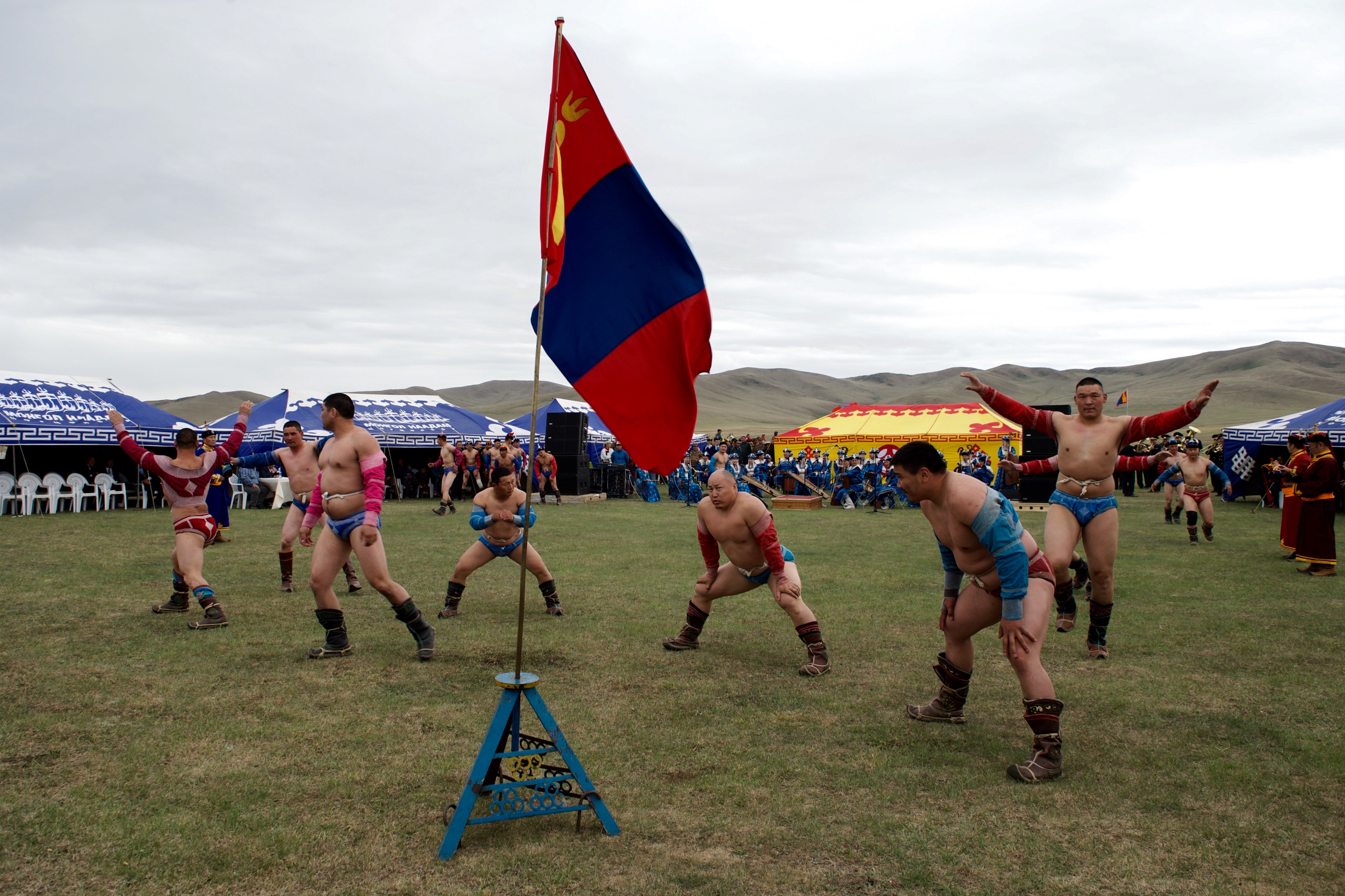
Mongolian wrestlers performing devee before wresting in an open field, June 2016

Different locales have different dancing styles. In Mongolia the wrestler imitates falcons or phoenix taking off (devee). In Inner Mongolia, the dance is supposed to be a mimicking of lions or tigers prancing (magshikh) as represented by the Üzemchin version.

Another major variation, popular among Mongols of Inner Mongolia's northeastern Khülünbüir region, resembles deer bounding (kharailtaa). All considered, the Üzemchin "magshikh" dance seems more strikingly robust-looking, partly due to the wrestler's dazzling apparel and partly the style of the dance itself. In contrast, the phoenix style of Mongolia appears to exhibit a greater degree of elegance.

Mongol wrestling dance has its original forms in shamanistic rituals where people imitated movements of various animals. Today, apart from its aesthetic value, the dance is also regarded as a warm-up and cool-down procedure before and after an intense fight. Good wrestlers treat the dance with great earnest and are often better dancers.

The dance is a standard component of the wrestling tradition. In Inner Mongolia, the practice was codified alongside the uriya (invocation), specific attire, and competition regulations in the inaugural Wrestling Competition Rules established in the late 1980s.

== Successful wrestlers ==
Historically the most successful wrestler is recorded as Namkhai who won the Naadam 19 times and 7 times finished second. He got his first Naadam win in 1895.

Only 20 wrestlers reached Giant rank in modern era (since 1921). Badmaanyambuugiin Bat-Erdene is considered to be the most successful wrestler in the modern era with 11 championship wins. He also won Naadam for the 750th anniversary of the Secret History of the Mongols in 1990.

	Name	Top rank	Wins	Runner-up	Winning years
1	Badmaanyambuugiin Bat-Erdene	State Grand Champion	11	1	1988–1990, 1992–1999
2	Khorloogiin Bayanmönkh	State Grand Champion	10	2	1968, 1971–1973, 1975, 1977, 1979, 1981–1982, 1987
3	Badamdorigiin Tüvdendorj	State Grand Champion	7	2	1939, 1941, 1945–1946, 1952–1954
4	Jigjidiin Mönkhbat	State Grand Champion	6	4	1963–1967, 1974
5	Dariin Damdin	State Grand Champion	5	5	1956–1960
6	Dashdorjiin Tserentogtokh	State Grand Champion	4	5	1978, 1980, 1983–1984
7	Sharaviin Batsuuri	State Grand Champion	2	2	1947–1948
8	Gelegjamtsyn Ösökhbayar	State Grand Champion	4	1	2002–2003, 2005, 2009
9	Agvaansamdangiin Sükhbat	State Grand Champion	3	1	2000–2001, 2004
10	Namsraijavyn Batsuuri	State Grand Champion	4	2	2014, 2018–2019, 2024
11	Natsagiin Jamyan	State Wide Champion	2	1	1926–1927
12	Orkhonbayar Bayarsaikhan	State Wide Champion	1	2	2022, 2024, 2026

== International ==
Mongolian National Wrestling Federation (MNWA) released dates of European Championship of Mongolian National Wrestling in Budapest.

== See also ==
- Mongolia at the Olympics
- Naadam
- Kazakh wrestling
