= Bharat Kesari =

Freestyle wrestling competition

Bharat Kesari Dangal is freestyle wrestling competition organised by the Haryana Sports and Youth Affairs department to commemorate the martyrdom day of Shaheed Bhagat Singh, Shivaram Rajguru and Sukhdev Thapar.

== 2017 Competition ==
In this year Bharat Kesari Dangal was organized at War Heros Memorial Stadium, Ambala Cantt, Haryana At 6 pm (Evening). It was a free style kushti competition which will be played by both male & female wrestlers. This kushti competition will played under Badalta Haryana Barhta Haryana

=== Inauguration Ceremony ===
Inauguration function will be start on 21 March 2017 at 6:00 PM. This contest will be played at War Heros Memorial Stadium, Ambala Cantt, Haryana. Guests present at the ceremony included CM. Manohar Lal Khattar, Pro Kaptaan Singh Solanki, Shri Anil Vij, Ram Bilash Sharma, Captain Abhiimanu, Shree Om Prakash Dhnakadh, Raav Narveer Singh, Kavita Jain, Krishna Lal Panwar, Vipul Goyal, Manish Kumar Grover, Krishna Kumar Bedi, Dr. Banwari Lal, Nayaab Singh, Brijbhushan Sharan Singh, Ratan Lal Kataria, Shyam Singh, Subhash Barala, Kamal Gupta, Shree Rajiv Mehta, Ashim Goyal, Kamal Gupta, etc.

=== Schedule of Bharat Kesari Dangal ===
- Inauguration: 21 March 2017
- Timing: At 6 pm (Evening)
- Venue: War Heros Memorial Stadium, Ambala Cantt., Haryana
- End of Dangal: 23 March 2017

=== Prize Money under Bharat Kesari Dangal 2017 ===
Competition will be held between 5 male & female wrestlers of 10 weight category. Here we have explained prize money to be given to the winners of Bharat Kesari Dangal:

Rs. 1 Crore to winner.

Rs. 50 Lakh will be given to first runner up.

Rs. 25 lakh will be given to second runner up.

=== Cultural Program ===
Haryana Govt. organized some cultural program to entertain viewers as seen below with time and date.

Program	Date
Haryana Saanskritik Sandhya	21-03-2017
Singing by Famous Singers	22-03-2017
Beautiful & Attractive Laser Show	23-03-2017

Sources:-

http://www.sarkaridunia.in/bharat-kesari-dangal-2017-check-teams-prize-money-schedule/

http://www.sarkaridunia.in/bharat-kesari-dangal-2017-indias-biggest-malefemale-free-style-kushti-contest/

== 2016 Competition ==
2016 edition of Bharat Kesari Dangal would be organised by Haryana Government at Tau Devi Lal Stadium from 21 to 23 March 2016 in association with Indian Olympic Association and Wrestling Federation of India (WFI).

== See also ==
- Hind Kesari
- Dominence of Haryana in sports
