= Chimedregzengiin Sanzhaadamba =

Mongolian freestyle wrestler

Chimedregzengiin Sanzhaadamba (Mongolian: Чимэдрэгзэнгийн Санжаадамба; born 30 December 1985, Khashaat, Arkhangai Province, Mongolia) is a Mongolian folk style wrestler of a "Bökh". He is the 2016 State Champion in the "Bökh" and holds the title of an "Ulsyn Avarga"

On 17 September 2011 the Mongolian National Wrestling Match was held with the attendance of 6002 wrestlers. Thus, it has become the largest wrestling competition in the world and is recorded in the Guinness Record Book. At this tournament Sanjaadamba won all the 13 rounds and became the champion.

== Bökh career record ==
Year	Level	Participants	Rank	Wins	Earned title	Notes
2023	State	512	State Champion			Өнжсөн
2022	State	1024	State Champion			Өнжсөн
2021	Cancelled		State Champion			Ковидоос болж тэмцээн цуцлагдсан
2020	State	512	State Champion	4		
2019	State	512	State Champion	6	Unen Zorigt	
2018	State	512	State Champion	8	Ulemj Badrakh	
2017	State	512	State Champion	4		
2016	State	1024	State Elephant	10	State Champion	
2015	State	512	State Elephant	7	Khuirnan Shuugigch	
2014	State	512	State Elephant	7	Saruul Saijrakh	
2013	State	512	State Elephant	5	Usukh Ider	
2012	State	512	State Elephant	4		
2011	State	1024	Unranked	7	State Elephant	
2010		256	Unranked	8	Khurts	
2009	State	512	Unranked	1		
2008		128	Falcon of Aimag	7		
2007	State	512	Falcon of Aimag	3		
State Naadam Winner Won at least 5 rounds in State Naadam Aimag/Sum Naadam Promotion
