= Hind Kesari =

Indian wrestling championship

Hind Kesari is an championship, established in 1958. Hind Kesari is India's independent heavyweight wrestling championship,It is governed by the Indian Style Wrestling Championship (ISWC).

== Winners ==
Hind Kesari Title Winners (ISWAI)
Year	Venue	Winner		Opponent	References
1958	Hyderabad	Ramchandra Babu Lal Keshri (रामचंद्र बाबू लाल केसरी)	Burhanpur, Madhya Pradesh	Pehalwan Dnyaniram पहलवान ज्ञानीराम	India's first Hind Kesari Ramchandra wrestler passes away | भारत के पहले हिंद केसरी रामचंद्र पहलवान का निधन (agniban.com) पंचतत्व में विलीन हुए प्रथम हिंद केसरी रामचंद्र बाबू पहलवान, बड़े बेटे ने दी मुखाग्नि - Burhanpur Hind Kesari dies (etvbharat.com)
1959	Delhi	Shripati Khanchnale	Kolhapur, Maharashtra	Banta Singh (Punjab Kesari)	
1960	Mumbai	Ganapatrao Andalkar	Kolhapur, Maharashtra		
1961	Ajmer	Karam Singh	Punjab		
1962	Delhi	Master Chandgi Ram	Haryana		
1963	Cuttack (Orissa)	Niranjan Das	West Bengal		
1964	Karnal	Maruti Mane	Maharashtra		
1966	Ahmedebad	Hazrat Patel	Maharashtra		
1968	Rohtak	Master Chandgi Ram	Haryana		
1969	Kanpur	Harishchandra Birajdar	Maharashtra		
1971	Nagpur	Deenanath Singh	Maharashtra		
1972	Indore	Master Chandgi Ram	Haryana		
1975	Banglore	Chamba Mutnal	Kolhapur-Belgaon		
1976	Rohtak	Satpal Singh	Delhi		
1977	Nashik	Asit Kumar Saha	West Bengal		
1978	Cuttack (Orissa)	Jai Prakash	Delhi		
1979	Badrakh	Jai Prakash	Delhi		
1983	Nashik	Vijay Bahadur Rajbhar	Uttar Pradesh		
1984	Nashik	Suresh Kumar	Haryana		
1985	Nathdwara	Jagdish Singh Bhola	Punjab		
1986	Solapur	Kishan Kumar	Haryana		
1992	Delhi	Sanjay Kumar	Haryana		
1994	Arra	Sanjay Kumar	Haryana		
1997	Akola	Bhagat Singh	Uttar Pradesh		
1998	Pimpri-Chinchwad	Bhagat Singh	Uttar Pradesh		
1999	Cochin	Bhagat Singh	Uttar Pradesh		
2000	Baliya	Rajeev Tomar	Delhi		
2003	Nashik	Vinod Chougule	Maharashtra		
2004	Ludhiana	Harminder Singh	Punjab		
2005	Ahmednagar	Yogesh Dodke	Maharashtra		
2006	Wardha	Rajeev Tomar	Delhi		
2007	Haliyal karnatak	Mohammed bin ghouse	Hyderabad		
2009	Pune	Joginder Singh	Delhi		
2010	Aurangabad	Mausam Khatri	Haryana		
2011	Hyderabad	Rohit Patel	Madhya Pradesh		
2012	Kolhapur	Yudhvir rana	Haryana		
2013	Bahadurgarh	Hitesh Kumar	Haryana		
2015	Ludhiana	Joginder Singh	Delhi		
2016	Pune	Sumit Kumar	NCR		
2023	Hyderabad	Abhijit Katake	Maharashtra	Somveer	Haryana
2024	Telangana	Samadhan Waghmode Patil	Maharashtra	bholu khari	delhi

2026 Satara Mahendra Gaikwad Maharashtra

== See also ==
- Bharat Kesari
