= Terry Paice =

Canadian wrestler (born 1953)

Personal information
- Born: 22 February 1953 (age 73) Whitewood, Saskatchewan, Canada

Sport
- Sport: Wrestling

Terry Paice (born 22 February 1953) is a Canadian wrestler. He competed in the men's freestyle 90 kg at the 1976 Summer Olympics.
