= Géza Molnár =

Hungarian wrestler (born 1953)

Personal information
- Nationality: Hungarian
- Born: 29 September 1953 (age 72) Budapest, Hungary

Sport
- Sport: Wrestling

Géza Molnár (born 29 September 1953) is a Hungarian wrestler. He competed in the men's freestyle 90 kg at the 1976 Summer Olympics.
