= Bob Anderson (wrestler) =

American wrestler and coach

- Anderson pictured center
Medal record
Men's Greco-Roman wrestling
Representing the United States
Pan American Games
Silver medal – second place	1971 Cali	82 kg
Men's Sambo
Representing the United States
Pan American Championships
Gold medal – first place	1977 Mexico City	90 kg
Gold medal – first place	1979 San Diego	100 kg

Bob Anderson (born 1943) is an American former wrestler and coach. Anderson was born in Oakland, California and raised in Redondo Beach, California.

== Early life ==
Anderson attended South High School in Torrance, California, where he placed 3rd his junior year, and finished as a California CIF Southern Section runner-up and helping his team to a CIF dual runner-up finish his senior year.

== College ==
In college, Anderson first attended El Camino College, where he won CCCAA championship twice and All-American twice winning as a freshman including his sophomore season with a record-breaking 1 loss the whole season. He was also inducted in the El Camino College Hall of Fame. He ended up transferring to Adams State College, where became a two-time NAIA All-American, and was a Rocky Mountain Champion. Anderson was also an NCAA Division I All-American, by placing sixth in the University division of the NCAA tournament.

In 2015, Adams was inducted into the Adams State University Athletics Hall of Fame.

== Greco-Roman wrestling ==
In 1968, Anderson began his senior level wrestling career when he won the Western Regional Olympic trials and then the 1968 Olympic trials in Greco-Roman. In 1971, placed 2nd at the Greco-Roman World Team trials. Anderson last competed in Greco-Roman wrestling at the 1979 Pan American championships.

== Coaching career ==
Shortly after his fall in the world championships, he became a coach. He coached his first competition in Mexico City leading his team to a team title. In 1978, Anderson traveled to Brazil, also leading two national teams to victory in the Sambo tournament. During this time, Anderson trained Rolls Gracie, whom he would teach techniques like the Americana Arm Bar. In 1984 Anderson was an assistant coach for a 3rd-placing national wrestling team in the Olympics held in Los Angeles. He was also a 1996 US Olympic Team Greco-Roman wrestling coach.

In 2003, he became the World Masters Wrestling Champion at 211 lbs. Anderson has also trained wrestlers such as Rulon Gardner, Dan Henderson, Heath Sims, and Randy Couture. Within the sport of wrestling, Anderson is a longtime champion, coach, and mentor. Every other year Anderson would host camps for wrestlers.

In 2009, he earned the Lifetime Service to Wrestling award by the National Wrestling Hall of Fame California chapter and later the California Wrestling Hall of Fame in 2018.
