= Shigeru Endo =

Japanese wrestler (born 1945)

Personal information
- Nationality: Japanese
- Born: 8 March 1945 (age 81) Miyagi, Japan

Sport
- Sport: Wrestling

Shigeru Endo (遠藤 茂, Endō Shigeru; born 8 March 1945) is a Japanese wrestler. He competed in the men's freestyle 87 kg at the 1968 Summer Olympics.
