= Boris Gurevich (wrestler, born 1937) =

Soviet wrestler (1937–2020)

Medal record

Men's freestyle wrestling

Representing the Soviet Union

Olympic Games
Gold medal – first place	1968 Mexico City	87 kg

World Championships
Gold medal – first place	1967 Delhi	87 kg
Gold medal – first place	1969 Mar del Plata	90 kg
Silver medal – second place	1961 Yokohama	87 kg

European Championships
Gold medal – first place	1967 Istanbul	87 kg
Gold medal – first place	1970 Berlin	90 kg

USSR Championships
Gold medal – first place	1967 Moscow	87 kg
Gold medal – first place	1966 Novosibirsk	87 kg
Gold medal – first place	1965 Yerevan	87 kg
Gold medal – first place	1961 Tallinn	87 kg
Gold medal – first place	1958 Tbilisi	87 kg
Gold medal – first place	1957 Kyiv	87 kg

Boris Gurevich

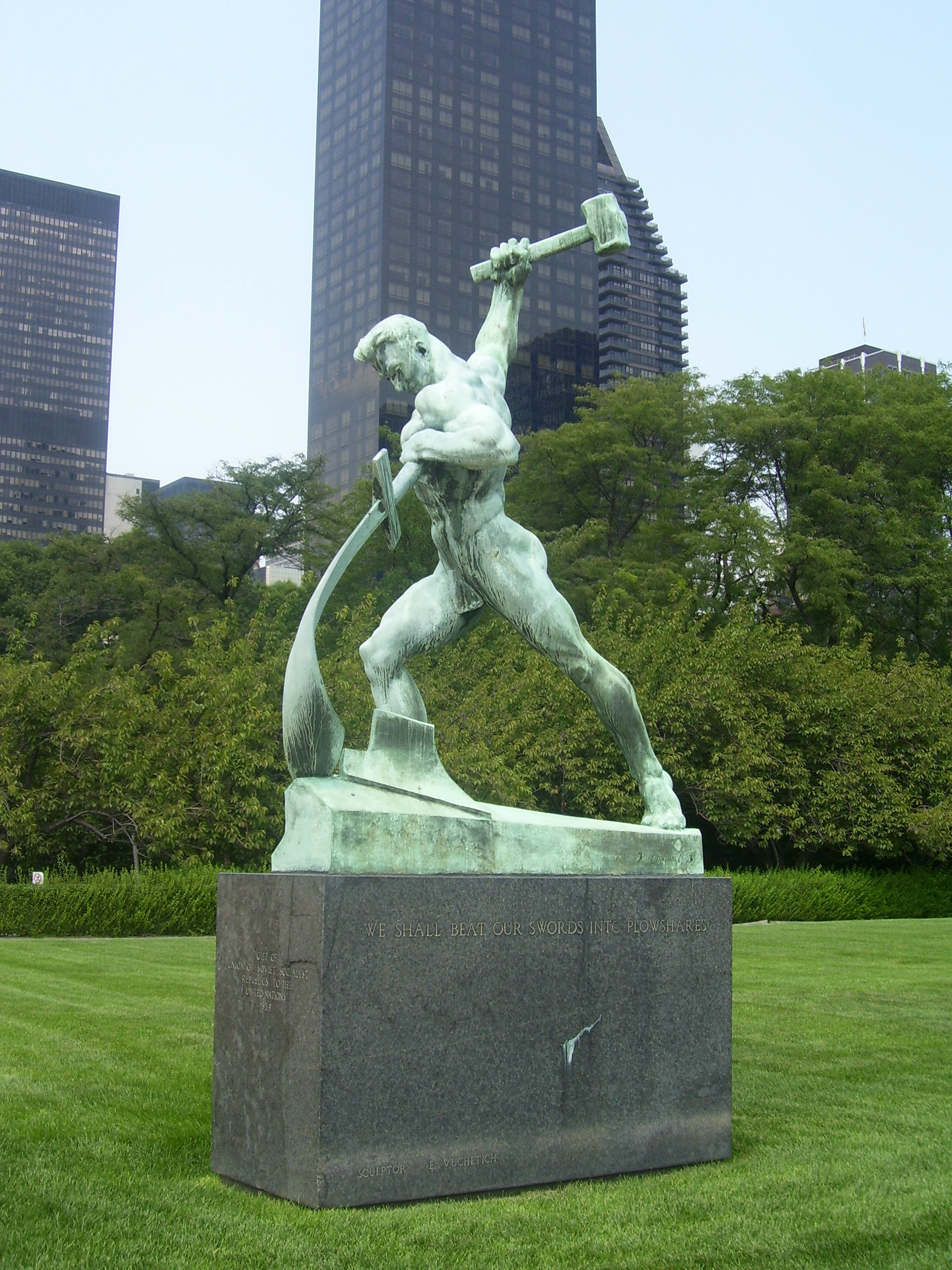

Boris Mikhaylovich Gurevich (also Gurevitch, Gurewitsch, or Hurevych; 23 February 1937 – 12 November 2020) was a Soviet wrestler.

The figure of Boris Gurevich served as a model for the allegorical sculpture of the Soviet sculptor Yevgeny Vuchetich "Let's Forge Swords into Plowshares", installed in 1957 in New York near the UN building.

Gurevich, who was Jewish, was born in Kiev, Ukraine.

== Career ==
Gurevich won the 1968 Summer Olympic Games freestyle middleweight (191.5 lbs; 87 kilograms) gold medal in Mexico City. He finished ahead of silver medalist Jigjidiin Mönkhbat of Mongolia and bronze medalist Prodan Gardzhev of Bulgaria, whith playing a draw against the Mongolian wrestler.

He won a silver medal at the 1961 World Wrestling Championships and the gold medal at the 1967 World Wrestling Championships in the 87 kilograms, the gold medal at the 1969 World Wrestling Championships in the 90 kilograms. He won the gold medal at the 1967 European Wrestling Championships in the 87 kilograms, and the gold medal at the 1970 European Wrestling Championships in the 90 kilograms.

The following was said about his wrestling style,

Incredible precision of movement, an attack that preempted the opponent—that's what captured the attention of experts. He combined beauty and strength, astonishing wrestling technique and a furious onslaught, precise, almost mathematical, calculation, and speed that bordered on risk.

He was inducted into the International Jewish Sports Hall of Fame in 1982.

== See also ==
- List of select Jewish wrestlers
