= Hüseyin Gürsoy =

Turkish wrestler

Personal information
- Full name: Hüseyin Gürsoy
- Nationality: Turkish
- Born: 1934 Oltu, Erzurum, Turkey
- Died: 1 September 1993 (aged 58–59) Oltu, Erzurum, Turkey
- Height: 176 cm (5 ft 9 in)
- Weight: 87 kg (192 lb)

Sport
- Country: Turkey
- Sport: Wrestling
- Event: Freestyle
Medal record
Mediterranean Games
Gold medal – first place	1967 Tunis	87 kg

Hüseyin Gürsoy (1934 – 1 September 1993) was a Turkish freestyle wrestler. He competed in the men's freestyle 87 kg at the 1968 Summer Olympics.

== Biography ==
Hüseyin Gürsoy was born in 1934 in the town of Oltu in Turkey.

In 1967 he won a gold medal at the 1967 Mediterranean Games wrestling tournament in the -97 kg category.
