= Ambroise Sarr =

Senegalese wrestler (1950–2023)

Personal information
- Nationality: Senegalese
- Born: 14 December 1950
- Died: 4 December 2024 (aged 73)

Sport
- Sport: Wrestling

Ambroise Sarr (14 December 1950 – 4 December 2024) was a Senegalese boxer and wrestler. He competed at the 1976, 1980, 1984, and the 1988 Summer Olympics. Sarr died on 4 December 2024, at the age of 73.
