= Mehmet Güçlü =

Turkish wrestler (born 1952)

Mehmet Güçlü (born 14 March 1952) is a Turkish former wrestler who competed in the 1972 Summer Olympics.
