= Wayne Thomas (wrestler) =

United States Virgin Islands wrestler

Personal information
- National team: United States Virgin Islands
- Born: October 21, 1959 (age 67)

Sport
- Sport: Wrestling

Wayne Thomas (born October 21, 1959) is a wrestler who represents the United States Virgin Islands. He competed in the men's freestyle 74 kg at the 1976 Summer Olympics.
