= Alioune Camara =

Senegalese wrestler

Alioune Camara (16 December 1943 – 22 January 2021) was a Senegalese wrestler who competed in the 1972 Summer Olympics.

== Biography ==
Alioune was born to a Senegalese father and his mother was from Lebanon.
