= Peter Döring =

German wrestler

Personal information
- Nationality: German
- Born: 14 August 1943 (age 82) Rostock, Germany

Sport
- Sport: Wrestling

Peter Döring (born 14 August 1943) is a German wrestler. He competed in the men's freestyle 87 kg at the 1968 Summer Olympics.
