= Stelică Morcov =

Romanian wrestler

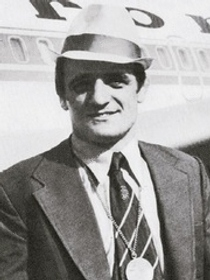
- Morcov in the 1970s

Personal information
- Born: 1 December 1951 (age 74) Azuga, Prahova County, Romania
- Height: 186 cm (73 in)
- Weight: 93 kg (205 lb)

Sport
- Sport: Freestyle wrestling
Medal record
Representing Romania
Olympic Games
Bronze medal – third place	1976 Montreal	-90 kg
European Championships
Bronze medal – third place	1976 Leningrad	-90 kg

Stelică Morcov (born 1 December 1951) is a Romanian retired light-heavyweight freestyle wrestler. He won bronze medals at the Summer Olympics and the European Wrestling Championships in 1976.
