= Étienne Martinetti =

Swiss wrestler

Étienne Martinetti (30 June 1940 – 1 April 2002) was a Swiss wrestler who competed in the 1972 Summer Olympics.
