= Tom Peckham =

American wrestler (born 1943)

Personal information
- Born: December 28, 1943 (age 82) Cresco, Iowa, U.S.

Sport
- Country: United States
- Sport: Wrestling
- Events: Freestyle and Folkstyle
- College team: Iowa State
- Team: USA
- Coached by: Harold Nichols
Medal record
Collegiate Wrestling
Representing the Iowa State Cyclones
NCAA Division I Championships
Gold medal – first place	1965 Laramie	177 lb
Gold medal – first place	1966 Ames	177 lb
Big Eight Championships
Gold medal – first place	1964 Stillwater	167 lb
Gold medal – first place	1966 Manhattan	177 lb

Tom Peckham (born December 28, 1943) is an American former wrestler. He competed in the men's freestyle 87 kg at the 1968 Summer Olympics.

He wrestling collegiately for the Iowa State Cyclones, where he was a two-time NCAA champion and three-time All-American. Peckham beat the 1965 Big Eight Champion and 1970 World silver medalist Bill Harlow 5-3 in the 177 lb event at the 1965 NCAA Championships. In 1966, he won his second Big Eight title and second NCAA championship, defeating 1966 team NCAA champion and 1969 World сhampion Fred Fozzard by fall in the 177 lb event. In 2004, Peckham was a National Wrestling Hall of Fame Glen Brand inductee.

Peckham was known for his explosive takedowns and riding style in freestyle wrestling.
