= Günter Spindler =

German wrestler

Günter Spindler (born 19 March 1949) is a German former wrestler who competed in the 1972 Summer Olympics.
