= Ion Marton =

Romanian wrestler (born 1946)

Ion Marton (born 15 May 1946) is a Romanian former wrestler who competed in the 1972 Summer Olympics.
