= Umberto Marcheggiani =

Italian wrestler

Umberto Marcheggiani (born 12 June 1943) is an Italian former wrestler who competed in the 1968 Summer Olympics and in the 1972 Summer Olympics.
