= Michel Grangier =

French wrestler

Michel Grangier (born 2 April 1948) is a French former wrestler who competed in the 1972 Summer Olympics and in the 1976 Summer Olympics.
