= Rusi Petrov =

Bulgarian wrestler (1944–2023)

Rusi Petrov (Bulgarian: Руси Петров; 26 April 1944 – 20 August 2023) was a Bulgarian wrestler who competed in the 1972 Summer Olympics.

In 1971, at the World Wrestling Championship he won gold in Men's freestyle, 90 kg category.

Petrov died on 20 August 2023, at the age of 79.
