= Jean-Marie Chardonnens =

Swiss wrestler

Jean-Marie Chardonnens (born 13 December 1942) is a Swiss former wrestler who competed in the 1968 Summer Olympics and in the 1972 Summer Olympics.
