= George Saunders (Canadian wrestler) =

Canadian wrestler

George Saunders (born 28 May 1949) is a Canadian former wrestler, born in Toronto, who competed in the 1972 Summer Olympics.
