= Gennady Strakhov =

Russian wrestler (1944–2020)

Medal record

Men's freestyle wrestling

Representing the Soviet Union

Olympic Games
Silver medal – second place	1972 Munich	light-heavyweight

World Wrestling Championships
Gold medal – first place	1970 Edmonton	90 kg

European Wrestling Championships
Gold medal – first place	1969 Modena	90 kg
Gold medal – first place	1972 Katowice	90 kg

Gennady Strakhov (1 November 1944 – 30 December 2020) was a Russian wrestler who competed in the 1972 Summer Olympics.

Strakhov died from COVID-19 in Moscow on 30 December 2020, during the COVID-19 pandemic in Russia. He was 76.
