= Ernst Knoll =

German wrestler

Ernst Knoll (23 January 1940 – 19 January 1997) was a German wrestler who competed in the 1968 Summer Olympics and in the 1972 Summer Olympics.
