= Lupe Lara =

Cuban wrestler (born 1944)

Lupe Lara (born 25 September 1944) is a Cuban former wrestler who competed in the 1968 Summer Olympics and in the 1972 Summer Olympics.
