= Paweł Kurczewski =

Polish wrestler

Paweł Zbigniew Kurczewski (17 August 1950 – 13 December 2009) was a Polish wrestler who competed in the 1972 Summer Olympics and in the 1976 Summer Olympics. He was born in Łódź.
