= Bárbaro Morgan =

Cuban wrestler (1951–2018)

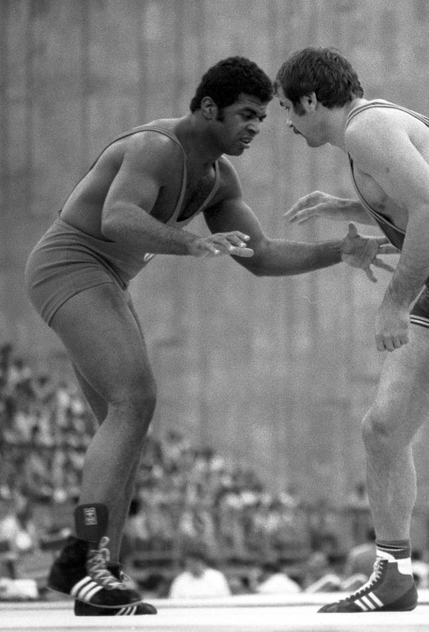
- Morgan (left) wrestling Ilya Mate at the 1980 Olympics

Personal information
- Full name: Bárbaro Julio Morgan Soroa
- Born: 4 December 1951 Florida, Cuba
- Died: 30 January 2018 (aged 66)
- Height: 184 cm (6 ft 0 in)

Sport
- Sport: Freestyle wrestling, Greco-Roman wrestling, sambo
Medal record
Representing Cuba
Freestyle wrestling
World Championships
Bronze medal – third place	1978 Mexico City	-100 kg
World Cup
Bronze medal – third place	1978 Toledo	-100 kg
Bronze medal – third place	1979 Toledo	-100 kg
Pan American Games
Silver medal – second place	1971 Cali	-90 kg
Silver medal – second place	1975 Mexico City	-90 kg
Silver medal – second place	1979 San Juan	-100 kg
Central American and Caribbean Games
Gold medal – first place	1974 Santo Domingo	-90 kg
Gold medal – first place	1978 Medellin	-100 kg
Greco-Roman wrestling
Pan American Games
Silver medal – second place	1975 Mexico City	-90 kg
Silver medal – second place	1979 San Juan	-100 kg
Sambo
Pan American Games
Gold medal – first place	1983 Caracas	+100 kg

Bárbaro Julio Morgan Soroa (4 December 1951 – 30 January 2018) was a heavyweight wrestler from Cuba, who competed in freestyle and Greco-Roman wrestling, winning a bronze medal at the 1978 World Championships in men's freestyle. He competed in men's freestyle at the 1972, 1976 and 1980 Summer Olympics and placed fifth-eighth. Morgan won three silver medals in freestyle wrestling at the Pan American Games in 1971–1979 and a gold medal in sambo in 1983 – the only year when sambo tournament was held at those games.
