= Raúl García (wrestler) =

Mexican wrestler (born 1943)

Personal information
- Full name: Raúl García Méndez
- Born: 25 December 1943 (age 82) Mexico City, Mexico
- Height: 180 cm (5 ft 11 in)
- Weight: 90 kg (198 lb)

Sport
- Country: Mexico
- Sport: Wrestling
Medal record
Representing Mexico
Pan American Games
Men's Freestyle Wrestling
Bronze medal – third place	1971 Cali	90 kg
Men's Greco-Roman wrestling
Bronze medal – third place	1979 San Juan	100 kg

Raúl García Méndez (born 25 December 1943) is a Mexican former wrestler who competed in the 1968 Summer Olympics and in the 1972 Summer Olympics.
