= Iran at the 1972 Summer Olympics =

- IOC code: IRI (IRN used at these Games)
- NOC: National Olympic Committee of Iran

in Munich, Germany
- Competitors: 50 in 7 sports
- Flag bearer: Moslem Eskandar-Filabi
- Medals Ranked 28th: Gold 0 Silver 2 Bronze 1 Total 3

Summer Olympics appearances (overview)
- 1900; 1904–1936; 1948; 1952; 1956; 1960; 1964; 1968; 1972; 1976; 1980–1984; 1988; 1992; 1996; 2000; 2004; 2008; 2012; 2016; 2020; 2024; 2028

Iran competed at the 1972 Summer Olympics in Munich, West Germany. Iran sent a delegation of 50 competitors, all men, who participated in 33 events in 7 sports. Moslem Eskandar-Filabi was the flag bearer.

== Competitors ==
Sport	Men	Women	Total
Athletics	3		3
Boxing	5		5
Cycling, Road	4		4
Cycling, Track	4		4
Fencing	2		2
Football	19		19
Weightlifting	3		3
Wrestling	14		14
Total	50	0	50

== Medal summary ==
=== Medal table ===
Sport	Gold	Silver	Bronze	Total
Weightlifting		1		1
Wrestling		1	1	2
Total	0	2	1	3

=== Medalists ===
Medal	Name	Sport	Event
Silver	Mohammad Nassiri	Weightlifting	Men's 56 kg
Silver	Rahim Aliabadi	Wrestling	Men's Greco-Roman 48 kg
Bronze	Ebrahim Javadi	Wrestling	Men's freestyle 48 kg

== Results by event ==
=== Athletics ===
Men

Athlete	Event	Heat			Second round			Semifinal			Final		Rank
Athlete	Event	Heat	Time	Rank	Heat	Time	Rank	Heat	Time	Rank	Time	Rank	Rank
Farhad Navab	100 m	4	11.02	6	Did not advance								75
Reza Entezari	400 m	8	47.89	4 Q	2	48.69	8	Did not advance					39
Reza Entezari	800 m	1	1:50.5	5	Did not advance						Did not advance		38

Athlete	Event	Qualifying round		Final	
Athlete	Event	Result	Rank	Result	Rank
Teymour Ghiasi	High jump	2.12	25	Did not advance	

=== Boxing ===
Men

Athlete	Event	1/32 final	1/16 final	1/8 final	Quarterfinal	Semifinal	Final	Rank
Manouchehr Bahmani	54 kg	Bye	Wang (ROC); L 2–3	Did not advance				17
Jabbar Feli	57 kg	Bye	Waruinge (KEN); L 1–4	Did not advance				17
Hossein Eghmaz	60 kg	Khallafallah (EGY); W RSC	Mikhailov (BUL); L 2–3	Did not advance				17
Nosrat Vakil Monfared	63.5 kg		Montague (IRL); L RSC	Did not advance				17
Vartex Parsanian	67 kg	Bye	Mkanga (TAN); W 5–0	Murunga (KEN); L RSC	Did not advance			9

=== Cycling ===
==== Road ====
Men

Athlete	Event	Time	Rank
Khosro Haghgosha; Taghikhan Khodavand; Gholam Hossein Kouhi; Behrouz Rahbar	Team time trial	2:34:30.7	32

==== Track ====
Men

Athlete	Event	Preliminary round	2nd round	1/8 final	Quarterfinal	Semifinal	Final	Rank
Gholam Hossein Kouhi	Sprint	Köther (FRG); Pedersen (DEN); L 11.30, DNS	Did not advance					—
Behrouz Rahbar	Sprint	Geschke (GDR); Díaz (COL); L 11.52, DNS	Did not advance					—

Athlete	Event	Heats		Quarterfinal	Semifinal	Final	Rank
Athlete	Event	Time	Rank	Quarterfinal	Semifinal	Final	Rank
Behrouz Rahbar	1 km time trial					1:15.39	28
Khosro Haghgosha	Individual pursuit	5:22.98	25	did not advance			25
Khosro Haghgosha; Taghikhan Khodavand; Gholam Hossein Kouhi; Behrouz Rahbar	Team pursuit	5:10.80	22	did not advance			22

=== Fencing ===
Men

Athlete	Event	Eliminating round		1/8 final		1/4 final		Semifinal		Final	Rank
Athlete	Event	Pools	Rank	Pools	Rank	Pools	Rank	Pools	Rank	Final	Rank
Pirouz Adamiat	Individual épée	Johnson (GBR); L 4–5	Pool L 6	Did not advance							59
Pirouz Adamiat	Individual épée	Schulze (GDR); L 2–5	Pool L 6	Did not advance							59
Pirouz Adamiat	Individual épée	Fenyvesi (HUN); W 5–2	Pool L 6	Did not advance							59
Pirouz Adamiat	Individual épée	Castillejos (MEX); L 2–5	Pool L 6	Did not advance							59
Pirouz Adamiat	Individual épée	von Essen (SWE); L 3–5	Pool L 6	Did not advance							59
Ali Asghar Pashapour	Individual épée	Trost (AUT); L 3–5	Pool E 5	Did not advance							60
Ali Asghar Pashapour	Individual épée	Uhlig (GDR); L 3–5	Pool E 5	Did not advance							60
Ali Asghar Pashapour	Individual épée	Manelli (LUX); L 2–5	Pool E 5	Did not advance							60
Ali Asghar Pashapour	Individual épée	Paramonov (URS); L 3–5	Pool E 5	Did not advance							60
Ali Asghar Pashapour	Individual épée	Masin (USA); W 5–3	Pool E 5	Did not advance							60
Ali Asghar Pashapour	Individual foil	Wessel (FRG); L 1–5	Pool A 5	Did not advance							48
Ali Asghar Pashapour	Individual foil	Chan (HKG); W 5–3	Pool A 5	Did not advance							48
Ali Asghar Pashapour	Individual foil	Kamuti (HUN); L 2–5	Pool A 5	Did not advance							48
Ali Asghar Pashapour	Individual foil	Calderón (MEX); L 2–5	Pool A 5	Did not advance							48
Ali Asghar Pashapour	Individual foil	Stankovich (URS); L 1–5	Pool A 5	Did not advance							48

=== Football ===
Men

Squad list	Preliminary round		Quarterfinal	Semifinal	Final	Rank
Squad list	Group C	Rank	Quarterfinal	Semifinal	Final	Rank
Reza Ghoflsaz; Ebrahim Ashtiani; Jafar Kashani; Majid Halvaei; Akbar Kargarjam; Parviz Ghelichkhani; Ali Parvin; Ali Jabbari; Mohammad Sadeghi; Safar Iranpak; Asghar Sharafi; Gholam Vafakhah; Javad Ghorab; Mahmoud Khordbin; Mehdi Lavasani; Alireza Azizi; Javad Allahverdi; Mehdi Monajati; Mansour Rashidi; Coach: Mohammad Ranjbar	Hungary; L 0–5	3	Did not advance			9
Reza Ghoflsaz; Ebrahim Ashtiani; Jafar Kashani; Majid Halvaei; Akbar Kargarjam; Parviz Ghelichkhani; Ali Parvin; Ali Jabbari; Mohammad Sadeghi; Safar Iranpak; Asghar Sharafi; Gholam Vafakhah; Javad Ghorab; Mahmoud Khordbin; Mehdi Lavasani; Alireza Azizi; Javad Allahverdi; Mehdi Monajati; Mansour Rashidi; Coach: Mohammad Ranjbar	Denmark; L 0–4	3	Did not advance			9
Reza Ghoflsaz; Ebrahim Ashtiani; Jafar Kashani; Majid Halvaei; Akbar Kargarjam; Parviz Ghelichkhani; Ali Parvin; Ali Jabbari; Mohammad Sadeghi; Safar Iranpak; Asghar Sharafi; Gholam Vafakhah; Javad Ghorab; Mahmoud Khordbin; Mehdi Lavasani; Alireza Azizi; Javad Allahverdi; Mehdi Monajati; Mansour Rashidi; Coach: Mohammad Ranjbar	Brazil; W 1–0	3	Did not advance			9

=== Weightlifting ===
Men

Athlete	Event	Press	Snatch	Clean & Jerk	Total	Rank
Mohammad Nasehi	52 kg	~~95.0~~	~~90.0~~	~~120.0~~	~~305.0~~	DOP
Mohammad Nassiri	56 kg	127.5	100.0	142.5	370.0	2nd place, silver medalist(s)
Nasrollah Dehnavi	67.5 kg	150.0	125.0	160.0	435.0	5

=== Wrestling ===
Men's freestyle

Athlete	Event	Round 1	Round 2	Round 3	Round 4	Round 5	Round 6	Round 7 / Final	Rank
Ebrahim Javadi	48 kg	Gonzales (USA); D Points	Jamsran (MGL); W Fall	Baygin (TUR); W Superiority	Umeda (JPN); W Points			Dmitriev (URS); W Points	3rd place, bronze medalist(s)
Ebrahim Javadi	48 kg	Gonzales (USA); D Points	Jamsran (MGL); W Fall	Baygin (TUR); W Superiority	Umeda (JPN); W Points			Nikolov (BUL); L Points	3rd place, bronze medalist(s)
Mohammad Ghorbani	52 kg	Kato (JPN); L Fall	Did not appear	Did not advance					24
Ramezan Kheder	57 kg	Mayer (GDR); W Points	Velarde (PER); W Fall	Gill (GBR); W Fall	Khoilogdorj (MGL); W Points	Klinga (HUN); L Points	Yanagida (JPN); L Points	Did not advance	7
Shamseddin Seyed-Abbasi	62 kg	Tůma (TCH); W Superiority	Ramos (CUB); W Points	Koutsoupakis (GRE); W Superiority	Toulotte (FRA); W Superiority	Abe (JPN); L Points	Did not appear	Did not advance	5
Abdollah Movahed	68 kg	Olmedo (PAN); W Superiority	Did not appear	Did not advance				Did not advance	25
Mansour Barzegar	74 kg	Bye	Yoshida (JPN); W Superiority	Urbanovics (HUN); D Points	Gusov (URS); W Fall	Seger (FRG); L Fall	Did not advance		5
Ali Hajiloo	82 kg	Sasaki (JPN); D Points	Aspin (NZL); W Points	Iorga (ROU); L Fall	Did not advance				13
Reza Khorrami	90 kg	Martinetti (SUI); W Fall	Kamada (JPN); W Points	Knoll (FRG); W Points	Peterson (USA); L Points	Bajkó (HUN); D Points	Did not advance		5
Abolfazl Anvari	100 kg	Engel (TCH); W Points	N'Diaye (SEN); W Fall	Bayanmönkh (MGL); L Fall	Yarygin (URS); L Fall	Did not advance		Did not advance	7
Moslem Eskandar-Filabi	+100 kg	Zambrano (PER); W Superiority	Taylor (USA); L Points	Makowiecki (POL); W Fall	Germer (GDR); W Points	Medved (URS); L Fall		Did not advance	4

Men's Greco-Roman

Athlete	Event	Round 1	Round 2	Round 3	Round 4	Round 5	Round 6	Round 7 / Final	Rank
Rahim Aliabadi	48 kg	Sarı (TUR); W Fall	Dlimi (TUN); W Fall	Maas (FRG); W Points	Ishida (JPN); L Superiority	Hirvonen (FIN); W Superiority		Berceanu (ROU); L Points	2nd place, silver medalist(s)
Rahim Aliabadi	48 kg	Sarı (TUR); W Fall	Dlimi (TUN); W Fall	Maas (FRG); W Points	Ishida (JPN); L Superiority	Hirvonen (FIN); W Superiority		Angelov (BUL); W Fall	2nd place, silver medalist(s)
Mehdi Houryar	52 kg	Kirov (BUL); L Fall	Zeman (TCH); L Points	Did not advance				Did not advance	15
Firouz Alizadeh	57 kg	Yamamoto (JPN); L Fall	Did not appear	Did not advance					28
Mohammad Dalirian	68 kg	Nakos (GRE); W Points	Apostolov (BUL); L Fall	Supron (POL); L Fall	Did not advance				15
