= Wrestling at the 1972 Summer Olympics – Men's freestyle 52 kg =

Men's freestyle 52 kg at the Games of the XX Olympiad
- Venue: Messe München
- Dates: 27–31 August 1972
- Competitors: 24 from 24 nations

Medalists
1st place, gold medalist(s)		Kiyomi Kato	Japan
2nd place, silver medalist(s)		Arsen Alakhverdiyev	Soviet Union
3rd place, bronze medalist(s)		Kim Gwong-Hyong	North Korea

The Men's Freestyle 52 kg at the 1972 Summer Olympics as part of the wrestling program at the Fairgrounds, Judo and Wrestling Hall.

== Medalists ==
Gold	Kiyomi Kato; Japan
Silver	Arsen Alakhverdiyev; Soviet Union
Bronze	Kim Gwong-Hyong; North Korea

== Tournament results ==
The competition used a form of negative points tournament, with negative points given for any result short of a fall. Accumulation of 6 negative points eliminated the wrestler. When only two or three wrestlers remain, a special final round is used to determine the order of the medals.

Legend

- DNA — Did not appear
- TPP — Total penalty points
- MPP — Match penalty points

Penalties

- 0 — Won by Fall, Passivity, Injury and Forfeit
- 0.5 — Won by Technical Superiority
- 1 — Won by Points
- 2 — Draw
- 2.5 — Draw, Passivity
- 3 — Lost by Points
- 3.5 — Lost by Technical Superiority
- 4 — Lost by Fall, Passivity, Injury and Forfeit

=== Round 1 ===
TPP	MPP		Time		MPP	TPP
2	2	Baju Baev (BUL)		Vincenzo Grassi (ITA)	2	2
0.5	0.5	Dorjzovdyn Ganbat (MGL)		Miguel Alonso (CUB)	3.5	3.5
3	3	Mohammad Arref (AFG)		Arsen Alakhverdiyev (URS)	1	1
0	0	Kiyomi Kato (JPN)	5:57	Mohammad Ghorbani (IRI)	4	4
4	4	Wanelge Castillo (PAN)	8:57	Andrzej Kudelski (POL)	0	0
0	0	Gordon Bertie (CAN)	2:14	Javier León (PER)	4	4
4	4	James Carr (USA)	4:57	Kim Young-Jun (KOR)	0	0
1	1	Sudesh Kumar (IND)		Ali Rıza Alan (TUR)	3	3
4	4	Willi Bock (GDR)	1:56	Henrik Gál (HUN)	0	0
3	3	Mario Sabatini (FRG)		Florentino Martínez (MEX)	1	1
3	3	Kim Gwong-Hyong (PRK)		Petru Ciarnău (ROU)	1	1
3.5	3.5	Pedro Piñeda (GUA)		John Kinsella (AUS)	0.5	0.5

=== Round 2 ===
TPP	MPP		Time		MPP	TPP
6	4	Baju Baev (BUL)	8:35	Dorjzovdyn Ganbat (MGL)	4	4.5
3	1	Vincenzo Grassi (ITA)		Miguel Alonso (CUB)	3	6.5
7	4	Mohammad Arref (AFG)	2:01	Kiyomi Kato (JPN)	0	0
1.5	0.5	Arsen Alakhverdiyev (URS)		Wanelge Castillo (PAN)	3.5	7.5
3	3	Andrzej Kudelski (POL)		Gordon Bertie (CAN)	1	1
8	4	Javier León (PER)	5:56	James Carr (USA)	0	4
4	4	Kim Young-Jun (KOR)	4:01	Sudesh Kumar (IND)	0	1
3	0	Ali Rıza Alan (TUR)	1:54	Willi Bock (GDR)	4	8
0	0	Henrik Gál (HUN)	7:41	Mario Sabatini (FRG)	4	7
5	4	Florentino Martínez (MEX)	7:47	Kim Gwong-Hyong (PRK)	0	3
1	0	Petru Ciarnău (ROU)	4:16	Pedro Piñeda (GUA)	4	7.5
0.5		John Kinsella (AUS)		Bye		
4		Mohammad Ghorbani (IRI)		DNA		

=== Round 3 ===
TPP	MPP		Time		MPP	TPP
3.5	3	John Kinsella (AUS)		Vincenzo Grassi (ITA)	1	4
7.5	3	Dorjzovdyn Ganbat (MGL)		Arsen Alakhverdiyev (URS)	1	2.5
0	0	Kiyomi Kato (JPN)	2:55	Andrzej Kudelski (POL)	4	7
1	0	Gordon Bertie (CAN)	3:35	James Carr (USA)	4	8
7	3	Kim Young-Jun (KOR)		Ali Rıza Alan (TUR)	1	4
1	0	Sudesh Kumar (IND)	7:07	Florentino Martínez (MEX)	4	9
3	3	Henrik Gál (HUN)		Kim Gwong-Hyong (PRK)	1	4
1		Petru Ciarnău (ROU)		Bye		

=== Round 4 ===
TPP	MPP		Time		MPP	TPP
1.5	0.5	Petru Ciarnău (ROU)		John Kinsella (AUS)	3.5	7
8	4	Vincenzo Grassi (ITA)	7:43	Arsen Alakhverdiyev (URS)	0	2.5
0.5	0.5	Kiyomi Kato (JPN)		Gordon Bertie (CAN)	3.5	4.5
1	0	Sudesh Kumar (IND)	3:17	Henrik Gál (HUN)	4	7
7.5	3.5	Ali Rıza Alan (TUR)		Kim Gwong-Hyong (PRK)	0.5	4.5

=== Round 5 ===
TPP	MPP		Time		MPP	TPP
3.5	2	Petru Ciarnău (ROU)		Arsen Alakhverdiyev (URS)	2	4.5
1.5	1	Kiyomi Kato (JPN)		Sudesh Kumar (IND)	3	4
7.5	3	Gordon Bertie (CAN)		Kim Gwong-Hyong (PRK)	1	5.5

=== Round 6 ===
TPP	MPP		Time		MPP	TPP
7.5	4	Petru Ciarnău (ROU)	1:35	Kiyomi Kato (JPN)	0	1.5
5.5	1	Arsen Alakhverdiyev (URS)		Sudesh Kumar (IND)	3	7
5.5		Kim Gwong-Hyong (PRK)		Bye		

=== Final ===
Results from the preliminary round are carried forward into the final (shown in yellow).

TPP	MPP		Time		MPP	TPP
	2	Kim Gwong-Hyong (PRK)		Arsen Alakhverdiyev (URS)	2	
	1	Kiyomi Kato (JPN)		Kim Gwong-Hyong (PRK)	3	5
5	3	Arsen Alakhverdiyev (URS)		Kiyomi Kato (JPN)	1	2

== Final standings ==
1. Kiyomi Kato (JPN)
2. Arsen Alakhverdiyev (URS)
3. Kim Gwong-Hyong (PRK)
4. Sudesh Kumar (IND)
5. Petru Ciarnău (ROU)
6. Gordon Bertie (CAN)
