= Wrestling at the 1972 Summer Olympics – Men's Greco-Roman 48 kg =

Men's Greco-Roman 48 kg at the Games of the XX Olympiad
- Venue: Messe München
- Dates: 5–10 September 1972
- Competitors: 20 from 20 nations

Medalists
1st place, gold medalist(s)		Gheorghe Berceanu	Romania
2nd place, silver medalist(s)		Rahim Aliabadi	Iran
3rd place, bronze medalist(s)		Stefan Angelov	Bulgaria

The Men's Greco-Roman 48 kg at the 1972 Summer Olympics as part of the wrestling program at the Fairgrounds, Judo and Wrestling Hall.

== Medalists ==
Gold	Gheorghe Berceanu; Romania
Silver	Rahim Aliabadi; Iran
Bronze	Stefan Angelov; Bulgaria

== Tournament results ==
The competition used a form of negative points tournament, with negative points given for any result short of a fall. Accumulation of 6 negative points eliminated the wrestler. When only two or three wrestlers remain, a special final round is used to determine the order of the medals.

Legend

- DNA — Did not appear
- TPP — Total penalty points
- MPP — Match penalty points

Penalties

- 0 — Won by Fall, Passivity, Injury and Forfeit
- 0.5 — Won by Technical Superiority
- 1 — Won by Points
- 2 — Draw
- 2.5 — Draw, Passivity
- 3 — Lost by Points
- 3.5 — Lost by Technical Superiority
- 4 — Lost by Fall, Passivity, Injury and Forfeit

=== Round 1 ===
TPP	MPP		Time		MPP	TPP
4	4	Habib Dlimi (TUN)	8:19	Mohamed El-Malky Ragheb (EGY)	0	0
0	0	Rahim Aliabadi (IRI)	6:54	Hızır Sarı (TUR)	4	4
4	4	Wayne Holmes (USA)	4:25	Bernd Drechsel (GDR)	0	0
4	4	Ferenc Seres (HUN)	7:43	Gheorghe Berceanu (ROU)	0	0
4	4	Vladimir Zubkov (URS)	8:50	Stefan Angelov (BUL)	0	0
3	3	Ochirdolgoryn Enkhtaivan (MGL)		Lennarth Svensson (SWE)	1	1
1	1	Lorenzo Calafiore (ITA)		Bernard Szczepański (POL)	3	3
4	4	Mohieddin El-Sas (SYR)	6:43	Alfredo Olvera (MEX)	0	0
3	3	Sotiris Ventas (GRE)		Raimo Hirvonen (FIN)	1	1
0.5	0.5	Kazuharu Ishida (JPN)		Günther Maas (FRG)	3.5	3.5

=== Round 2 ===
TPP	MPP		Time		MPP	TPP
8	4	Habib Dlimi (TUN)	6:58	Rahim Aliabadi (IRI)	0	0
5	1	Hızır Sarı (TUR)		Wayne Holmes (USA)	3	7
4	4	Bernd Drechsel (GDR)	1:08	Ferenc Seres (HUN)	0	4
0	0	Gheorghe Berceanu (ROU)	8:09	Vladimir Zubkov (URS)	4	8
0.5	0.5	Stefan Angelov (BUL)		Lennarth Svensson (SWE)	3.5	4.5
1	0	Lorenzo Calafiore (ITA)	3:56	Alfredo Olvera (MEX)	4	4
7	4	Bernard Szczepański (POL)	1:32	Sotirios Ventas (GRE)	0	3
2	1	Raimo Hirvonen (FIN)		Kazuharu Ishida (JPN)	3	3.5
3.5		Günther Maas (FRG)		Bye		
0		Mohamed El-Malky (EGY)		DNA		
3		Ochirdolgoryn Enkhtaivan (MGL)		DNA		
4		Mohieddin El-Sas (SYR)		DNA		

=== Round 3 ===
TPP	MPP		Time		MPP	TPP
6.5	3	Günther Maas (FRG)		Rahim Aliabadi (IRI)	1	1
9	4	Hızır Sarı (TUR)	5:55	Bernd Drechsel (GDR)	0	4
7	3	Ferenc Seres (HUN)		Stefan Angelov (BUL)	1	1.5
0	0	Gheorghe Berceanu (ROU)	7:53	Lennarth Svensson (SWE)	4	8.5
1	0	Lorenzo Calafiore (ITA)	7:59	Sotirios Ventas (GRE)	4	7
7.5	3.5	Alfredo Olvera (MEX)		Raimo Hirvonen (FIN)	0.5	2.5
3.5		Kazuharu Ishida (JPN)		Bye		

=== Round 4 ===
TPP	MPP		Time		MPP	TPP
4	0.5	Kazuharu Ishida (JPN)		Rahim Aliabadi (IRI)	3.5	4.5
7	3	Bernd Drechsel (GDR)		Gheorghe Berceanu (ROU)	1	1
2.5	1	Stefan Angelov (BUL)		Lorenzo Calafiore (ITA)	3	4
2.5		Raimo Hirvonen (FIN)		Bye		

=== Round 5 ===
TPP	MPP		Time		MPP	TPP
6	3.5	Raimo Hirvonen (FIN)		Rahim Aliabadi (IRI)	0.5	5
7	3	Kazuharu Ishida (JPN)		Stefan Angelov (BUL)	1	3.5
1	0	Gheorghe Berceanu (ROU)	0:00	Lorenzo Calafiore (ITA)	4	8

=== Final ===
Results from the preliminary round are carried forward into the final (shown in yellow).

TPP	MPP		Time		MPP	TPP
	3	Rahim Aliabadi (IRI)		Gheorghe Berceanu (ROU)	1	
	4	Stefan Angelov (BUL)	2:00	Rahim Aliabadi (IRI)	0	3
1	0	Gheorghe Berceanu (ROU)	0:00	Stefan Angelov (BUL)	4	8

== Final standings ==
1. Gheorghe Berceanu (ROU)
2. Rahim Aliabadi (IRI)
3. Stefan Angelov (BUL)
4. Raimo Hirvonen (FIN)
5. Kazuharu Ishida (JPN)
6. Lorenzo Calafiore (ITA)
