= Wrestling at the 1972 Summer Olympics – Men's freestyle 48 kg =

Men's freestyle 48 kg at the Games of the XX Olympiad
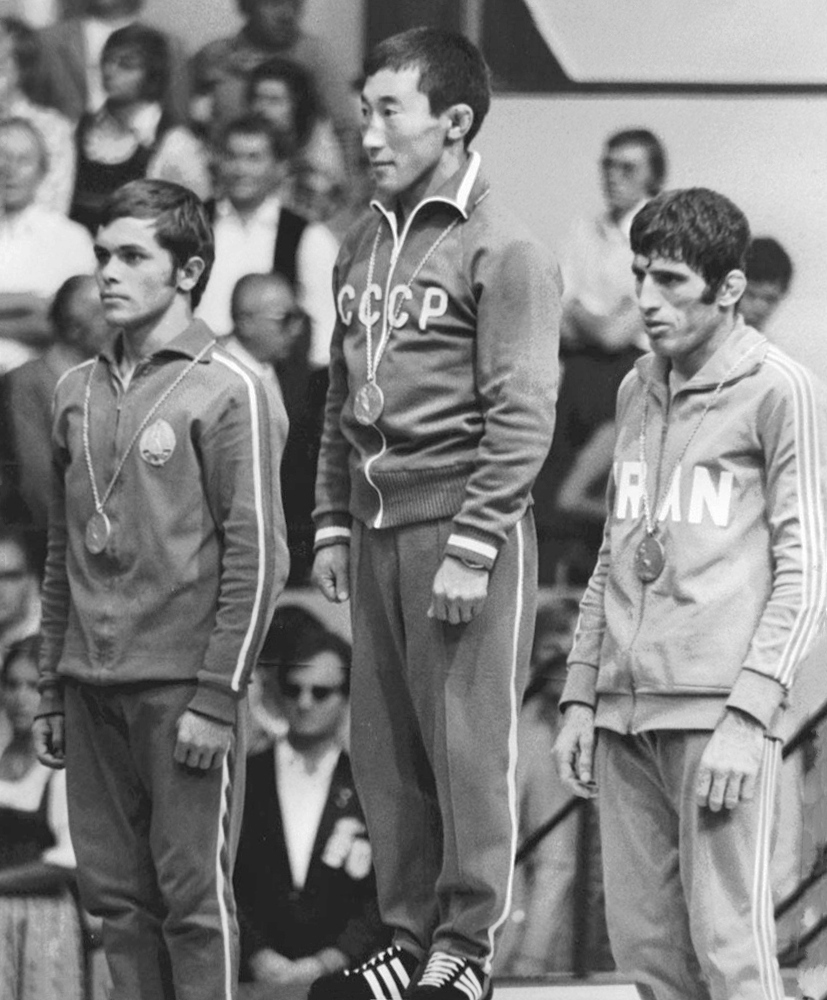
- Medal winners
- Venue: Messe München
- Dates: 27–31 August 1972
- Competitors: 14 from 14 nations

Medalists
1st place, gold medalist(s)		Roman Dmitriyev	Soviet Union
2nd place, silver medalist(s)		Ognyan Nikolov	Bulgaria
3rd place, bronze medalist(s)		Ebrahim Javadi	Iran

The Men's Freestyle 48 kg at the 1972 Summer Olympics as part of the wrestling program at the Fairgrounds, Judo and Wrestling Hall.

== Medalists ==
Gold	Roman Dmitriyev; Soviet Union
Silver	Ognyan Nikolov; Bulgaria
Bronze	Ebrahim Javadi; Iran

== Tournament results ==
The competition used a form of negative points tournament, with negative points given for any result short of a fall. Accumulation of 6 negative points eliminated the wrestler. When only two or three wrestlers remain, a special final round is used to determine the order of the medals.

Legend

- DNA — Did not appear
- TPP — Total penalty points
- MPP — Match penalty points

Penalties

- 0 — Won by Fall, Passivity, Injury and Forfeit
- 0.5 — Won by Technical Superiority
- 1 — Won by Points
- 2 — Draw
- 2.5 — Draw, Passivity
- 3 — Lost by Points
- 3.5 — Lost by Technical Superiority
- 4 — Lost by Fall, Passivity, Injury and Forfeit

=== Round 1 ===
TPP	MPP		Time		MPP	TPP
2	2	Ognyan Nikolov (BUL)		Sefer Baygin (TUR)	2	2
3.5	3.5	Gad Tsobari (ISR)		Attila Laták (HUN)	0.5	0.5
2	2	Ebrahim Javadi (IRI)		Sergio Gonzalez (USA)	2	2
3	3	Bazarragchaagiin Jamsran (MGL)		Rolf Lacour (FRG)	1	1
1	1	Jürgen Möbius (GDR)		Jang Dok-Ryong (PRK)	3	3
3	3	Ion Arapu (ROU)		Masahiko Umeda (JPN)	1	1
4	4	Adkar Maruti (IND)	8:14	Roman Dmitriyev (URS)	0	0

=== Round 2 ===
TPP	MPP		Time		MPP	TPP
2	0	Ognyan Nikolov (BUL)	3:50	Gad Tsobari (ISR)	4	7.5
2	0	Sefer Baygin (TUR)	0:45	Attila Laták (HUN)	4	4.5
2	0	Ebrahim Javadi (IRI)	4:09	Bazarragchaagiin Jamsran (MGL)	4	7
4	2	Sergio Gonzalez (USA)		Rolf Lacour (FRG)	2	3
4	3	Jürgen Möbius (GDR)		Ion Arapu (ROU)	1	4
4	1	Jang Dok-Ryong (PRK)		Adkar Maruti (IND)	3	7
4	3	Masahiko Umeda (JPN)		Roman Dmitriyev (URS)	1	1

=== Round 3 ===
TPP	MPP		Time		MPP	TPP
2	0	Ognyan Nikolov (BUL)	0:50	Attila Laták (HUN)	4	8.5
5.5	3.5	Sefer Baygin (TUR)		Ebrahim Javadi (IRI)	0.5	2.5
6	2	Sergio Gonzalez (USA)		Jürgen Möbius (GDR)	2	6
7	4	Rolf Lacour (FRG)	8:18	Ion Arapu (ROU)	0	4
7	3	Jang Dok-Ryong (PRK)		Masahiko Umeda (JPN)	1	5
1		Roman Dmitriyev (URS)		Bye		

=== Round 4 ===
TPP	MPP		Time		MPP	TPP
2	1	Roman Dmitriyev (URS)		Ognyan Nikolov (BUL)	3	5
6.5	1	Sefer Baygin (TUR)		Ion Arapu (ROU)	3	7
3.5	1	Ebrahim Javadi (IRI)		Masahiko Umeda (JPN)	3	8

=== Final ===
Results from the preliminary round are carried forward into the final (shown in yellow).

TPP	MPP		Time		MPP	TPP
	1	Roman Dmitriyev (URS)		Ognyan Nikolov (BUL)	3	
4	3	Roman Dmitriyev (URS)		Ebrahim Javadi (IRI)	1	
4	1	Ognyan Nikolov (BUL)		Ebrahim Javadi (IRI)	3	4

== Final standings ==
1. Roman Dmitriyev (URS)
2. Ognyan Nikolov (BUL)
3. Ebrahim Javadi (IRI)
4. Sefer Baygin (TUR)
5. Ion Arapu (ROU)
6. Masahiko Umeda (JPN)
