= Wrestling at the 1972 Summer Olympics =

Wrestling at the Games of the XX Olympiad
- Venue: Messegelände
- Dates: 27 August – 10 September
- Competitors: 388 from 49 nations

At the 1972 Summer Olympics, 20 wrestling events were contested, all for men. There were 10 weight classes in Greco-Roman wrestling and 10 classes in freestyle wrestling.

== Medal summary ==
=== Freestyle ===
| Event | Gold | Silver | Bronze |
|---|---|---|---|
| 48 kg | Roman Dmitriev; Soviet Union | Ognyan Nikolov; Bulgaria | Ebrahim Javadi; Iran |
| 52 kg | Kiyomi Kato; Japan | Arsen Alakhverdiev; Soviet Union | Kim Gwong-hyong; North Korea |
| 57 kg | Hideaki Yanagida; Japan | Richard Sanders; United States | László Klinga; Hungary |
| 62 kg | Zagalav Abdulbekov; Soviet Union | Vehbi Akdağ; Turkey | Ivan Krastev; Bulgaria |
| 68 kg | Dan Gable; United States | Kikuo Wada; Japan | Ruslan Ashuraliev; Soviet Union |
| 74 kg | Wayne Wells; United States | Jan Karlsson; Sweden | Adolf Seger; West Germany |
| 82 kg | Levan Tediashvili; Soviet Union | John Peterson; United States | Vasile Iorga; Romania |
| 90 kg | Ben Peterson; United States | Gennadi Strakhov; Soviet Union | Károly Bajkó; Hungary |
| 100 kg | Ivan Yarygin; Soviet Union | Khorloogiin Bayanmönkh; Mongolia | József Csatári; Hungary |
| +100 kg | Aleksandr Medved; Soviet Union | Osman Duraliev; Bulgaria | Chris Taylor; United States |

=== Greco-Roman ===
| Event | Gold | Silver | Bronze |
|---|---|---|---|
| 48 kg | Gheorghe Berceanu; Romania | Rahim Aliabadi; Iran | Stefan Angelov; Bulgaria |
| 52 kg | Petar Kirov; Bulgaria | Koichiro Hirayama; Japan | Giuseppe Bognanni; Italy |
| 57 kg | Rustam Kazakov; Soviet Union | Hans-Jürgen Veil; West Germany | Risto Björlin; Finland |
| 62 kg | Georgi Markov; Bulgaria | Heinz-Helmut Wehling; East Germany | Kazimierz Lipień; Poland |
| 68 kg | Shamil Khisamutdinov; Soviet Union | Stoyan Apostolov; Bulgaria | Gian Matteo Ranzi; Italy |
| 74 kg | Vítězslav Mácha; Czechoslovakia | Petros Galaktopoulos; Greece | Jan Karlsson; Sweden |
| 82 kg | Csaba Hegedűs; Hungary | Anatoly Nazarenko; Soviet Union | Milan Nenadić; Yugoslavia |
| 90 kg | Valery Rezantsev; Soviet Union | Josip Čorak; Yugoslavia | Czesław Kwieciński; Poland |
| 100 kg | Nicolae Martinescu; Romania | Nikolay Yakovenko; Soviet Union | Ferenc Kiss; Hungary |
| +100 kg | Anatoly Roshchin; Soviet Union | Aleksandar Tomov; Bulgaria | Victor Dolipschi; Romania |

== Medal table ==
| Rank | Nation | Gold | Silver | Bronze | Total |
|---|---|---|---|---|---|
| 1 | Soviet Union | 9 | 4 | 1 | 14 |
| 2 | United States | 3 | 2 | 1 | 6 |
| 3 | Bulgaria | 2 | 4 | 2 | 8 |
| 4 | Japan | 2 | 2 | 0 | 4 |
| 5 | Romania | 2 | 0 | 2 | 4 |
| 6 | Hungary | 1 | 0 | 4 | 5 |
| 7 | Czechoslovakia | 1 | 0 | 0 | 1 |
| 8 | Iran | 0 | 1 | 1 | 2 |
| 8 | Sweden | 0 | 1 | 1 | 2 |
| 8 | West Germany | 0 | 1 | 1 | 2 |
| 8 | Yugoslavia | 0 | 1 | 1 | 2 |
| 12 | East Germany | 0 | 1 | 0 | 1 |
| 12 | Greece | 0 | 1 | 0 | 1 |
| 12 | Mongolia | 0 | 1 | 0 | 1 |
| 12 | Turkey | 0 | 1 | 0 | 1 |
| 16 | Italy | 0 | 0 | 2 | 2 |
| 16 | Poland | 0 | 0 | 2 | 2 |
| 18 | Finland | 0 | 0 | 1 | 1 |
| 18 | North Korea | 0 | 0 | 1 | 1 |
| Totals (19 entries) | | 20 | 20 | 20 | 60 |

== Participating nations ==
A total of 388 wrestlers from 49 nations competed at the Munich Games:

- Afghanistan (8)
- Argentina (3)
- Australia (3)
- Austria (4)
- Belgium (2)
- Bulgaria (20)
- Canada (9)
- Cuba (7)
- Czechoslovakia (10)
- Denmark (3)
- East Germany (17)
- Egypt (4)
- Finland (10)
- France (5)
- Great Britain (6)
- Greece (9)
- Guatemala (4)
- Hungary (18)
- India (8)
- Iran (14)
- Israel (2)
- Italy (7)
- Japan (20)
- Lebanon (2)
- Mexico (9)
- Mongolia (13)
- Morocco (3)
- Netherlands (1)
- New Zealand (1)
- North Korea (2)
- Norway (5)
- Pakistan (2)
- Panama (2)
- Peru (4)
- Philippines (3)
- Poland (18)
- Portugal (3)
- Republic of China (1)
- Romania (20)
- Senegal (4)
- South Korea (4)
- Soviet Union (20)
- Sweden (7)
- Switzerland (9)
- Syria (2)
- Tunisia (2)
- Turkey (16)
- United States (19)
- West Germany (17)
- Yugoslavia (10)

== See also ==
- List of World and Olympic Champions in men's freestyle wrestling
- List of World and Olympic Champions in Greco-Roman wrestling

== Sources ==
- "Olympic Medal Winners". International Olympic Committee.
