= 1970 World Wrestling Championships =

- Host city: Edmonton, Canada
- Dates: 4–11 July 1970

Champions
- Freestyle: Soviet Union
- Greco-Roman: Soviet Union

The 1970 World Wrestling Championships were held in Edmonton, Alberta, Canada from 4 to 11 July 1970.

== Medal table ==
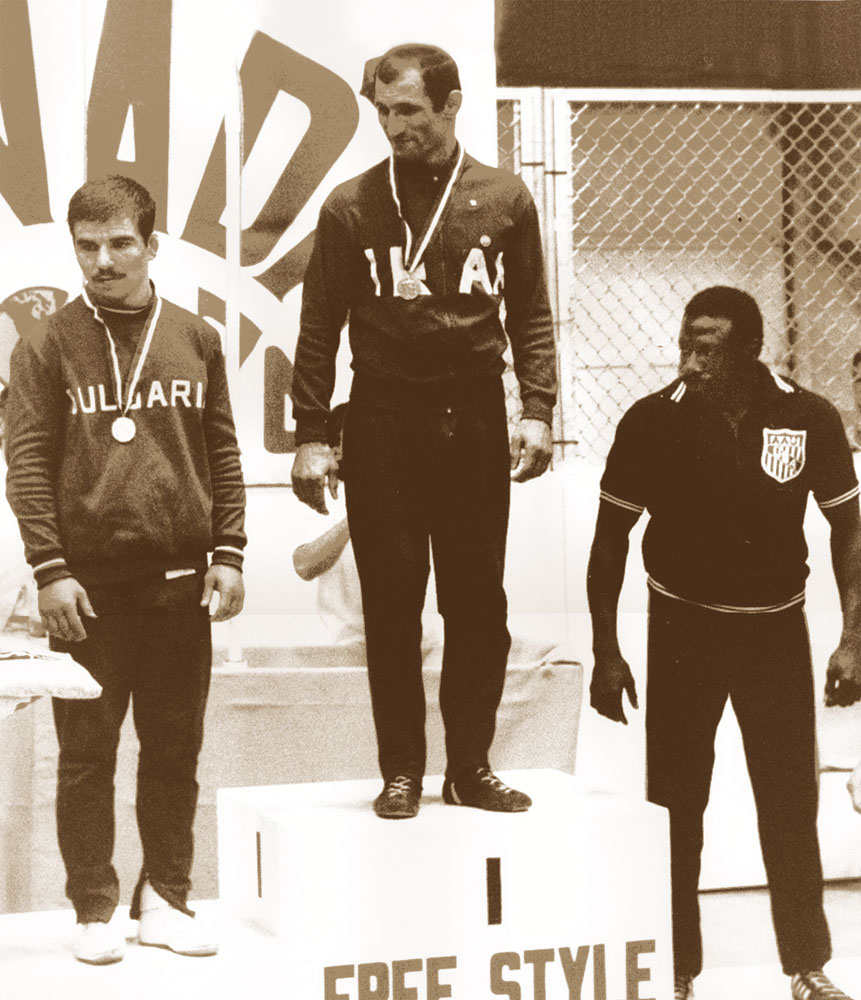
Medal winners of freestyle 68 kg. From left to right, Ismail Yuseinov, Abdollah Movahed and Bobby Douglas

| Rank | Nation | Gold | Silver | Bronze | Total |
|---|---|---|---|---|---|
| 1 | Soviet Union | 9 | 1 | 3 | 13 |
| 2 | Iran | 3 | 1 | 1 | 5 |
| 3 | Japan | 2 | 4 | 2 | 8 |
| 4 | Bulgaria | 1 | 4 | 3 | 8 |
| 5 | United States | 1 | 3 | 2 | 6 |
| 6 | Hungary | 1 | 2 | 0 | 3 |
| 7 | Romania | 1 | 1 | 2 | 4 |
| 8 | Turkey | 1 | 0 | 1 | 2 |
| 9 | Sweden | 1 | 0 | 0 | 1 |
| 10 | Yugoslavia | 0 | 1 | 2 | 3 |
| 11 | Poland | 0 | 1 | 1 | 2 |
| 12 | South Korea | 0 | 1 | 0 | 1 |
| 12 | West Germany | 0 | 1 | 0 | 1 |
| 14 | East Germany | 0 | 0 | 1 | 1 |
| 14 | Greece | 0 | 0 | 1 | 1 |
| 14 | Mongolia | 0 | 0 | 1 | 1 |
| Totals (16 entries) | | 20 | 20 | 20 | 60 |

== Team ranking ==
| Rank | Men's freestyle | | Men's Greco-Roman | |
| Rank | Team | Points | Team | Points |
|---|---|---|---|---|
| 1 | Soviet Union | 40 | Soviet Union | 43 |
| 2 | United States | 31.5 | Bulgaria | 27.5 |
| 3 | Iran | 27.5 | Yugoslavia | 22 |
| 4 | Japan | 27 | Hungary | 19.5 |
| 5 | Bulgaria | 25.83 | Romania | 19.5 |
| 6 | Turkey | 16.5 | Japan | 17 |

== Medal summary ==
=== Freestyle ===
| Event | Gold | Silver | Bronze |
|---|---|---|---|
| 48 kg | Ebrahim Javadi; Iran | Akihiko Umeda; Japan | Roman Dmitriev; Soviet Union |
| 52 kg | Ali Rıza Alan; Turkey | Bayu Baev; Bulgaria | Mohammad Ghorbani; Iran |
| 57 kg | Hideaki Yanagida; Japan | An Jae-won; South Korea | Yancho Patrikov; Bulgaria |
| 62 kg | Shamseddin Seyed-Abbasi; Iran | Kiyoshi Abe; Japan | Mike Young; United States |
| 68 kg | Abdollah Movahed; Iran | Ismail Yuseinov; Bulgaria | Bobby Douglas; United States |
| 74 kg | Wayne Wells; United States | Mohammad Farhangdoust; Iran | Danzandarjaagiin Sereeter; Mongolia |
| 82 kg | Yury Shakhmuradov; Soviet Union | Tatsuo Sasaki; Japan | Vasile Iorga; Romania |
| 90 kg | Gennady Strakhov; Soviet Union | Bill Harlow; United States | Makoto Kamada; Japan |
| 100 kg | Vladimir Gulyutkin; Soviet Union | Larry Kristoff; United States | Gıyasettin Yılmaz; Turkey |
| +100 kg | Aleksandr Medved; Soviet Union | Osman Duraliev; Bulgaria | Peter Germer; East Germany |

=== Greco-Roman ===
| Event | Gold | Silver | Bronze |
|---|---|---|---|
| 48 kg | Gheorghe Berceanu; Romania | Vladimir Zubkov; Soviet Union | Bernard Szczepański; Poland |
| 52 kg | Petar Kirov; Bulgaria | Saburo Sugiyama; Japan | Boško Marinko; Yugoslavia |
| 57 kg | János Varga; Hungary | David Hazewinkel; United States | Rustam Kazakov; Soviet Union |
| 62 kg | Hideo Fujimoto; Japan | Slavko Koletić; Yugoslavia | Georgi Markov; Bulgaria |
| 68 kg | Roman Rurua; Soviet Union | Simion Popescu; Romania | Takashi Tanoue; Japan |
| 74 kg | Viktor Igumenov; Soviet Union | Werner Schröter; West Germany | Petros Galaktopoulos; Greece |
| 82 kg | Anatoly Nazarenko; Soviet Union | Petar Krumov; Bulgaria | Milan Nenadić; Yugoslavia |
| 90 kg | Valery Rezantsev; Soviet Union | Czesław Kwieciński; Poland | Venko Tsintsarov; Bulgaria |
| 100 kg | Pelle Svensson; Sweden | Ferenc Kiss; Hungary | Nikolay Yakovenko; Soviet Union |
| +100 kg | Anatoly Roshchin; Soviet Union | József Csatári; Hungary | Nicolae Martinescu; Romania |
