= Wrestling at the 1972 Summer Olympics – Men's freestyle +100 kg =

Men's freestyle +100 kg at the Games of the XX Olympiad
- Venue: Messe München
- Dates: 27–31 August 1972
- Competitors: 13 from 13 nations

Medalists
1st place, gold medalist(s)		Aleksandr Medved	Soviet Union
2nd place, silver medalist(s)		Osman Duraliev	Bulgaria
3rd place, bronze medalist(s)		Chris Taylor	United States

The men's freestyle +100 kg at the 1972 Summer Olympics as part of the wrestling program at the Fairgrounds, Judo and Wrestling Hall.

== Medalists ==
Gold	Aleksandr Medved; Soviet Union
Silver	Osman Duraliev; Bulgaria
Bronze	Chris Taylor; United States

== Tournament results ==
The competition used a form of negative points tournament, with negative points given for any result short of a fall. Accumulation of 6 negative points eliminated the wrestler. When only two or three wrestlers remain, a special final round is used to determine the order of the medals.

Legend

- DNA — Did not appear
- TPP — Total penalty points
- MPP — Match penalty points

Penalties

- 0 — Won by Fall, Passivity, Injury and Forfeit
- 0.5 — Won by Technical Superiority
- 1 — Won by Points
- 2 — Draw
- 2.5 — Draw, Passivity
- 3 — Lost by Points
- 3.5 — Lost by Technical Superiority
- 4 — Lost by Fall, Passivity, Injury and Forfeit

=== Round 1 ===
Chris Taylor was controversially defeated by two-time defending gold medalist Alexander Medved. It appeared Medved was stalling but the referee awarded a point to the Soviet, charging Taylor with a lack of action. Later admitting that he felt sorry for Medved because of Taylor's size, the referee was dismissed from the Olympic tournament and banned from international officiating. In the Greco-Roman competition Taylor was unexpectedly suplexed and pinned by a much lighter Wilfried Dietrich, whom he defeated a week before in the freestyle contest.

TPP	MPP		Time		MPP	TPP
1	1	Stanisław Makowiecki (POL)		Yorihide Isogai (JPN)	3	3
3.5	3.5	Miguel Zambrano (PER)		Moslem Eskandar-Filabi (IRI)	0.5	0.5
3	3	Chris Taylor (USA)		Alexander Medved (URS)	1	1
0	0	Gıyasettin Yılmaz (TUR)	1:17	Oldřich Vlasák (TCH)	4	4
0	0	Wilfried Dietrich (FRG)	5:22	István Maróthy (HUN)	4	4
1	1	Osman Duraliev (BUL)		Peter Germer (GDR)	3	3
0		Ştefan Stîngu (ROU)		Bye		

=== Round 2 ===
TPP	MPP		Time		MPP	TPP
2.5	2.5	Ştefan Stîngu (ROU)		Stanisław Makowiecki (POL)	2.5	3.5
4	1	Yorihide Isogai (JPN)		Miguel Zambrano (PER)	3	6.5
3.5	3	Moslem Eskandar-Filabi (IRI)		Chris Taylor (USA)	1	4
1	0	Alexander Medved (URS)	8:59	Gıyasettin Yılmaz (TUR)	4	4
8	4	Oldřich Vlasák (TCH)	6:54	Wilfried Dietrich (FRG)	0	0
8	4	István Maróthy (HUN)	4:56	Osman Duraliev (BUL)	0	1
3		Peter Germer (GDR)		Bye		

=== Round 3 ===
TPP	MPP		Time		MPP	TPP
5	2	Peter Germer (GDR)		Ştefan Stîngu (ROU)	2	4.5
7.5	4	Stanisław Makowiecki (POL)	2:35	Moslem Eskandar-Filabi (IRI)	0	3.5
8	4	Yorihide Isogai (JPN)	1:45	Chris Taylor (USA)	0	4
2	1	Alexander Medved (URS)		Wilfried Dietrich (FRG)	3	3
8	4	Gıyasettin Yılmaz (TUR)	2:31	Osman Duraliev (BUL)	0	1

=== Round 4 ===
TPP	MPP		Time		MPP	TPP
8	3	Peter Germer (GDR)		Moslem Eskandar-Filabi (IRI)	1	4.5
8.5	4	Ştefan Stîngu (ROU)	1:26	Alexander Medved (URS)	0	2
5	1	Chris Taylor (USA)		Wilfried Dietrich (FRG)	3	6
1		Osman Duraliev (BUL)		Bye		

=== Round 5 ===
TPP	MPP		Time		MPP	TPP
4	3	Osman Duraliev (BUL)		Chris Taylor (USA)	1	6
8.5	4	Moslem Eskandar-Filabi (IRI)	4:01	Alexander Medved (URS)	0	2

=== Final ===
Results from the preliminary round are carried forward into the final (shown in yellow).

TPP	MPP		Time		MPP	TPP
3	3	Osman Duraliev (BUL)		Alexander Medved (URS)	1	1

== Final standings ==
1. Alexander Medved (URS)
2. Osman Duraliev (BUL)
3. Chris Taylor (USA)
4. Moslem Eskandar-Filabi (IRI)
5. Wilfried Dietrich (FRG)
6. Peter Germer (GDR)
