= 1971 World Wrestling Championships – Men's freestyle 48 kg =

Men's freestyle 48 kg at the 1971 World Championships
- Dates: 27 August 1971
- Competitors: 16 from 16 nations

Medalists
gold medal	Ebrahim Javadi	Iran
silver medal	Bazarragchaagiin Jamsran	Mongolia
bronze medal	Ognyan Nikolov	Bulgaria

The Men's Freestyle 48 kg at the 1971 World Wrestling Championships were held at the Vasil Levski National Stadium, Sofia.

== Tournament results ==
The competition used a form of negative points tournament, with negative points given for any result short of a fall. Accumulation of 6 negative points eliminated the wrestler. When only two or three wrestlers remain, a special final round is used to determine the order of the medals.

Legend

- TF — Won by Fall
- DQ — Won by Passivity or forfeit
- D2 — Both wrestlers lost by Passivity
- DNA — Did not appear

Penalties

- 0 — Won by Fall and Disqualification
- 0.5 — Won by Technical Superiority
- 1 — Won by Points
- 2 — Draw
- 2.5 — Draw, Passivity
- 3 — Lost by Points
- 3.5 — Lost by Technical Superiority
- 4 — Lost by Fall and Disqualification

=== 1st round ===
TPP	MPP		Score		MPP	TPP
1	1	Gonzales (USA)		Baygin (TUR)	3	3
0.5	0.5	Ebrahim Javadi (IRI)		Tzabari (ISR)	3.5	3.5
4	4	Мicek (TCH)	TF	Bazarragchaagiin Jamsran (MGL)	0	0
3	3	Arapou (ROM)		Roman Dmitriev (URS)	1	1
4	4	Stivilla (ITA)	TF	Мöbius (GDR)	0	0
0	0	Umeda (JPN)	TF	Рanк Chang Ryong (KOR)	4	4
0	0	Ognyan Nikolov (HUN)	TF	Маnsour (IRQ)	4	4
2	2	Latak (ROM)		Cоrderо (URS)	2	2

=== 2st round ===
TPP	MPP		Score		MPP	TPP
2	1	Gonzales (USA)		Latak (ROM)	3	5
4	1	Baygin (TUR)		Cоrderо (URS)	3	5
0.5	0	Ebrahim Javadi (IRI)	TF	Мicek (TCH)	4	8
7.5	4	Tzabari (ISR)	TF	Bazarragchaagiin Jamsran (MGL)	0	0
3	0	Arapou (ROM)	TF	Stivilla (ITA)	4	8
2	1	Roman Dmitriev (URS)		Мöbius (GDR)	3	3
3	3	Umeda (JPN)		Ognyan Nikolov (HUN)	1	1
4	0	Рanк Chang Ryong (KOR)	TF	Маnsour (IRQ)	4	8

=== 3rd round ===
TPP	MPP		Score		MPP	TPP
3	1	Gonzales (USA)		Cоrderо (CUB)	3	8
4.5	0.5	Baygin (TUR)		Latak (ROM)	3.5	8.5
1	0.5	Ebrahim Javadi (IRI)		Bazarragchaagiin Jamsran (MGL) (TCH)	3.5	3.5
4	1	Arapou (ROM)		Мöbius (GDR)	3	6
5	3	Roman Dmitriev (URS)		Umeda (JPN)	1	4
7	3	Рanк Chang Ryong (KOR)		Ognyan Nikolov (HUN)	1	2

=== 4th round ===
TPP	MPP		Score		MPP	TPP
6.5	3.5	Gonzales (USA)		Ebrahim Javadi (IRI)	0.5	1.5
7.5	3	Baygin (TUR)		Bazarragchaagiin Jamsran (MGL) (TCH)	1	4.5
8	4	Arapou (ROM)	TF	Umeda (JPN)	0	4
6	1	Roman Dmitriev (URS)		Ognyan Nikolov (HUN)	3	5

=== 5th round ===
TPP	MPP		Score		MPP	TPP
7	3	Umeda (JPN)		Ebrahim Javadi (IRI)	1	2.5
6.5	2	Bazarragchaagiin Jamsran (MGL)		Ognyan Nikolov (HUN)	2	7

== Final standings ==
1. Ebrahim Javadi (IRI)
2. Bazarragchaagiin Jamsran (MGL)
3. Ognyan Nikolov (BUL)
4. Akihiko Umeda (JPN)
5. Roman Dmitriev (URS)
6. Sergio Gonzales (USA)
