= Tunisia at the 1972 Summer Olympics =

- IOC code: TUN
- NOC: Tunisian Olympic Committee

in Munich
- Competitors: 35 in 5 sports
- Flag bearer: Salem Boughattas
- Medals Ranked 33rd: Gold 0 Silver 1 Bronze 0 Total 1

Summer Olympics appearances (overview)
- 1960; 1964; 1968; 1972; 1976; 1980; 1984; 1988; 1992; 1996; 2000; 2004; 2008; 2012; 2016; 2020; 2024

Tunisia competed at the 1972 Summer Olympics in Munich, West Germany.

== Medalists ==
=== Silver ===
- Mohammed Gammoudi — Athletics, men's 5000m

== Athletics ==
Men
Track & road events

Athlete	Event	Heat		Quarterfinal		Semifinal		Final	
Athlete	Event	Result	Rank	Result	Rank	Result	Rank	Result	Rank
Mansour Guettaya	800 m	1:49.4	2 Q	—N/a		1:49.8	7	Did not advance	
Mansour Guettaya	1500 m	3:43.9	5	Did not advance					
Mohammed Gammoudi	5000 m	13:49.8	1 Q	—N/a				13:27.4	Silver medal
Mohammed Gammoudi	10,000 m	27:54.69	1 Q	—N/a				DNF	
Hassan Bergaoui	400 m hurdles	53.70	7	Did not advance					
Abdelkader Zaddem	10,000 m	28:14.70	4 Q	Did not advance				28:18.17	8

== Boxing ==
Men

Athlete	Event	1 Round	2 Round	3 Round	Quarterfinals	Semifinals	Final
Athlete	Event	Opposition Result	Opposition Result	Opposition Result	Opposition Result	Opposition Result	Rank
Ali Gharbi	Flyweight	BYE	Tim Dement (USA); L 0–5	Did not advance			
Abdelaziz Hammi	Bantamweight	Leopold Agbazo (DAH); W 5–0	Koh Keun-Sang (KOR); L 0–5	Did not advance			
Mohamed Majeri	Light-middleweight	BYE	Issoufou Habou (NIG); W 5–0	Alan Jenkinson (AUS); W 5–0	Dieter Kottysch (FRG); L 0–5	Did not advance	5

== Handball ==
=== Men's team competition ===
Roster:

Ahmed Bel Hadj
Raouf Ben Samir
Moncef Besbès
Taoufik Djemail
Aleya Hamrouni
Mouir Jelili
Mohamed Jeljeli
Mohamed Khalladi
Mohamed Klai
Faouzi Ksouri
Moncef Oueslati
Faouzi Sebabti
Amor Sghaier
Abdelaziz Zaibi
Ridha Zitoun
Rached Boudhina

=== Group B ===
Rank	Team	Pld	W	D	L	GF	GA	Pts	(East Germany)	(Czechoslovakia)	(Iceland)	(Tunisia)
1.	East Germany	3	3	0	0	51	32	6	X	14:12	16:11	21:9
2.	Czechoslovakia	3	1	1	1	56	40	3	12:14	X	19:19	25:7
3.	Iceland	3	1	1	1	57	51	3	11:16	19:19	X	27:16
4.	Tunisia	3	0	0	3	32	73	0	9:21	7:25	16:27	X

30 August

Czechoslovakia	25-7	Tunisia

01 September

East Germany	21-9	Tunisia

03 September

Iceland	27-16	Tunisia

=== Classification matches ===
07 September

Denmark	29-21	Tunisia

=== 15th place match ===
09 September

Spain	23-20	Tunisia

== Volleyball ==
=== Men's team competition ===
==== Preliminary round ====
Pool A

Pos	Team	Pld	W	L	Pts	SW	SL	SR	SPW	SPL	SPR	Qualification
1	Soviet Union	5	5	0	10	15	3	5.000	257	196	1.311	Semifinals
2	Bulgaria	5	4	1	9	13	8	1.625	294	235	1.251	Semifinals
3	Czechoslovakia	5	3	2	8	11	6	1.833	230	205	1.122	5th–8th semifinals
4	South Korea	5	2	3	7	7	10	0.700	209	197	1.061	5th–8th semifinals
5	Poland	5	1	4	6	8	12	0.667	237	259	0.915	9th place match
6	Tunisia	5	0	5	5	0	15	0.000	90	225	0.400	11th place match

Date		Score		Set 1	Set 2	Set 3	Set 4	Set 5	Total
27 Aug	Soviet Union	3–0	Tunisia	15–10	15–6	15–4			45–20
29 Aug	Poland	3–0	Tunisia	15–6	15–11	15–1			45–18
31 Aug	Czechoslovakia	3–0	Tunisia	15–11	15–4	15–10			45–25
02 Sep	South Korea	3–0	Tunisia	15–1	15–3	15–1			45–5
05 Sep	Bulgaria	3–0	Tunisia	15–10	15–5	15–7			45–22

==== Final round ====
11th place match

Date		Score		Set 1	Set 2	Set 3	Set 4	Set 5	Total
08 Sep	Tunisia	1–3	West Germany	5–15	16–14	4–15	9–15		34–59

==== Team roster ====
- Mohamed Ben Cheikh
- Moncef Ben Soltane
- Samir Lamouchi
- Hamouda Ben Messaoud
- Raja Hayder
- Naceur Bounatouf
- Oueil Behi Mohamed
- Abdelaziz Derbal
- Rafik Ben Amor
- Abdelaziz Bousarsar
- Naceur Ben Othman

== Wrestling ==
Men's Greco-Roman

Athlete	Event	Elimination Pool						Final round	
Athlete	Event	Round 1 Result	Round 2 Result	Round 3 Result	Round 4 Result	Round 5 Result	Round 6 Result	Final round Result	Rank
Habib Dlimi	−48 kg	Mohamed El-Malky (EGY); L T 8:19	Rahim Aliabadi (IRI); L T 6:58	—N/a				Did not advance	16
