= Wrestling at the 1970 Asian Games =

Asian Games

- Venue: Amporn Garden Hall
- Dates: 10–13 December 1970
- Competitors: 61 from 8 nations

Wrestling was one of the sports which was held at the 1970 Asian Games in Bangkok, Thailand between 10 and 13 December 1970. The competition included only men's freestyle events.

Iran topped the medals table, with six golds, followed by Japan with 4 gold medals. India also won a gold medal.

== Medalists ==
Event	Gold	Silver	Bronze
48 kg	Ebrahim Javadi; Iran	Yoshiyuki Matsuhashi; Japan	Kim Hwa-kyung; South Korea
52 kg	Mohammad Ghorbani; Iran	Kiyomi Kato; Japan	Kim Young-jun; South Korea
57 kg	Hideaki Yanagida; Japan	An Jae-won; South Korea	Sardar Muhammad; Pakistan
62 kg	Shamseddin Seyed-Abbasi; Iran	Kiyoshi Abe; Japan	Kim Moon-ki; South Korea
68 kg	Abdollah Movahed; Iran	Shared gold	Om Prakash; India
68 kg	Kikuo Wada; Japan	Shared gold	Om Prakash; India
74 kg	Toshitada Yoshida; Japan	Mohammad Farhangdoust; Iran	Mukhtiar Singh; India
82 kg	Tatsuo Sasaki; Japan	Ali Hajiloo; Iran	Netra Pal Singh; India
90 kg	Dariush Zakeri; Iran	Jit Singh; India	Koichi Tani; Japan
100 kg	Chandgi Ram; India	Shizuo Yada; Japan	Abolfazl Anvari; Iran
+100 kg	Moslem Eskandar-Filabi; Iran	Yorihide Isogai; Japan	Maroof Khan; Pakistan

== Medal table ==
Rank	Nation	Gold	Silver	Bronze	Total
1	Iran (IRN)	6	2	1	9
2	Japan (JPN)	4	5	1	10
3	India (IND)	1	1	3	5
4	South Korea (KOR)	0	1	3	4
5	Pakistan (PAK)	0	0	2	2
Totals (5 entries)		11	9	10	30

== Participating nations ==
A total of 61 athletes from 8 nations competed in wrestling at the 1970 Asian Games:

- Ceylon (3)
- India (10)
- Indonesia (2)
- Iran (10)
- Japan (10)
- Pakistan (9)
- South Korea (7)
- Thailand (10)
