= 1969 World Wrestling Championships =

- Host city: Mar del Plata, Argentina
- Dates: 3–10 March 1969

Champions
- Freestyle: Soviet Union
- Greco-Roman: Soviet Union

The 1969 World Wrestling Championships were held in Mar del Plata, Argentina from 3 to 10 March 1969.

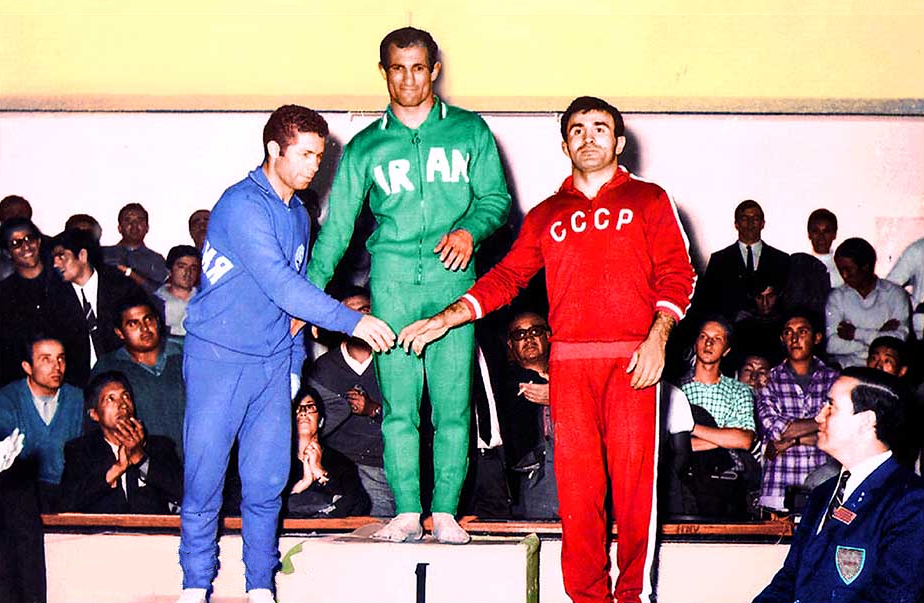
Medal winners of freestyle 68 kg. From left to right, Enyu Valchev, Abdollah Movahed and Nodar Khokhashvili

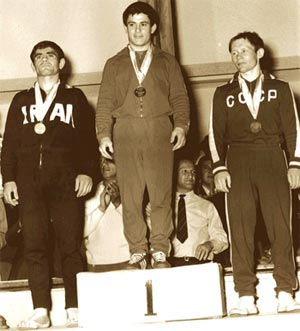
Medal winners of Greco-Roman 48 kg. From left to right, Rahim Aliabadi, Gheorghe Berceanu and Vladislav Kustov

== Medal table ==
| Rank | Nation | Gold | Silver | Bronze | Total |
|---|---|---|---|---|---|
| 1 | Soviet Union | 10 | 2 | 6 | 18 |
| 2 | Iran | 3 | 3 | 2 | 8 |
| 3 | United States | 2 | 3 | 2 | 7 |
| 4 | Romania | 2 | 1 | 1 | 4 |
| 5 | Japan | 2 | 0 | 2 | 4 |
| 6 | Bulgaria | 1 | 5 | 2 | 8 |
| 7 | Sweden | 0 | 1 | 2 | 3 |
| 8 | Finland | 0 | 1 | 1 | 2 |
| 8 | Yugoslavia | 0 | 1 | 1 | 2 |
| 10 | South Korea | 0 | 1 | 0 | 1 |
| 10 | West Germany | 0 | 1 | 0 | 1 |
| Totals (11 entries) | | 20 | 19 | 19 | 58 |

== Team ranking ==
| Rank | Men's freestyle | | Men's Greco-Roman | |
| Rank | Team | Points | Team | Points |
|---|---|---|---|---|
| 1 | Soviet Union | 44 | Soviet Union | 53 |
| 2 | United States | 38 | Bulgaria | 26 |
| 3 | Iran | 37 | Romania | 23 |
| 4 | Bulgaria | 27 | Sweden | 20 |
| 5 | Japan | 25 | Finland | 12.5 |
| 6 | Mongolia | 10 | West Germany | 12.5 |

== Medal summary ==
=== Freestyle ===
| Event | Gold | Silver | Bronze |
|---|---|---|---|
| 48 kg | Ebrahim Javadi; Iran | Roman Dmitriev; Soviet Union | Akihiko Umeda; Japan |
| 52 kg | Rick Sanders; United States | Mohammad Ghorbani; Iran | Tariel Alibegashvili; Soviet Union |
| 57 kg | Tadamichi Tanaka; Japan | Donald Behm; United States | Aboutaleb Talebi; Iran |
| 62 kg | Takeo Morita; Japan | Shamseddin Seyed-Abbasi; Iran | Zagalav Abdulbekov; Soviet Union |
| 68 kg | Abdollah Movahed; Iran | Enyu Valchev; Bulgaria | Nodar Khokhashvili; Soviet Union |
| 74 kg | Zarbeg Beriashvili; Soviet Union | Wayne Wells; United States | Seiji Yamagata; Japan |
| 82 kg | Fred Fozzard; United States | None awarded | None awarded |
| 90 kg | Boris Gurevich; Soviet Union | Rusi Petrov; Bulgaria | Henk Schenk; United States |
| 100 kg | Shota Lomidze; Soviet Union | Larry Kristoff; United States | Vasil Todorov; Bulgaria |
| +100 kg | Aleksandr Medved; Soviet Union | Osman Duraliev; Bulgaria | Abolfazl Anvari; Iran |

=== Greco-Roman ===
| Event | Gold | Silver | Bronze |
|---|---|---|---|
| 48 kg | Gheorghe Berceanu; Romania | Rahim Aliabadi; Iran | Vladislav Kustov; Soviet Union |
| 52 kg | Firouz Alizadeh; Iran | Cornel Turturea; Romania | Ivan Mikhailishin; Soviet Union |
| 57 kg | Rustam Kazakov; Soviet Union | An Chun-young; South Korea | David Hazewinkel; United States |
| 62 kg | Roman Rurua; Soviet Union | Roland Svensson; Sweden | Martti Laakso; Finland |
| 68 kg | Simion Popescu; Romania | Sreten Damjanović; Yugoslavia | Yury Grigoriev; Soviet Union |
| 74 kg | Viktor Igumenov; Soviet Union | Eero Tapio; Finland | Matti Poikala; Sweden |
| 82 kg | Petar Krumov; Bulgaria | Omar Bliadze; Soviet Union | Milan Nenadić; Yugoslavia |
| 90 kg | Aleksandr Yurkevich; Soviet Union | Venko Tsintsarov; Bulgaria | Nicolae Neguț; Romania |
| 100 kg | Nikolay Yakovenko; Soviet Union | Stefan Petrov; Bulgaria | Lennart Eriksson; Sweden |
| +100 kg | Anatoly Roshchin; Soviet Union | Wilfried Dietrich; West Germany | Petar Donev; Bulgaria |
