= Vlasák =

Vlasák (feminine Vlasáková) is a Czech surname denoting a person with a large amount of hair (Czech: vlasy). Notable people include:

- Hana Vlasáková, Czech volleyball player
- Jan Vlasák (1943), Czech actor, famous for his role in the 2005 film Hostel
- Jerry Vlasak, American animal rights activist
- Lavínia Vlasak, Brazilian actress
- Lenka Vlasáková, Czech actress
- Oldřich Vlasák (1955–2024), Czech politician
- Oldřich Vlasák (wrestler), Czech wrestler
- Tomáš Vlasák, Czech ice hockey player

Wlassak is a Germanized version of the surname.

- Rudolf Wlassak, Austrian physiologist
