= Mohammad Ghorbani =

Mohammad Ghorbani may refer to:

- Mohammad Ghorbani (wrestler)
- Mohammad Ghorbani (footballer)
