= Calafiore =

Calafiore is a surname. Notable people with the surname include:

- Aydan Calafiore (born 2000), Australian singer
- Cody Calafiore (born 1990), American real estate agent, actor, and model
- Jim Calafiore, American comic book drawer
- Lorenzo Calafiore (1935–2011), Italian wrestler
