= Dlimi =

Dlimi is a surname. Notable people with the surname include:

- Ahmed Dlimi (1931–1983), Moroccan general
- Daniel Dlimi (fl. 2001), former guitarist for Swedish death metal band Aeon
- Habib Dlimi (born 1950), Tunisian wrestler
