= Ognyan =

Ognyan (Bulgarian: Огнян) is a Bulgarian masculine given name that may refer to

- Ognyan Gerdzhikov (born 1946), Bulgarian politician
- Ognyan Nikolov (born 1949), Bulgarian sport wrestler
- Ognyan Toshev (born 1940), Bulgarian cyclist
