= Lennart Svensson =

Lennart Svensson may refer to:

- Lennart Svensson (footballer)
- Lennart Svensson (wrestler)
