= Kazuharu =

- Gender: Male

Origin
- Origin: Japanese
- Meaning: Different meanings depending on the kanji used

Kazuharu (written: 和春, 和晴 or 一治) is a masculine Japanese given name. Notable people with the name include:

- Kazuharu Ishida (石田 和春; born 1948), Japanese sport wrestler
- Kirinji Kazuharu (麒麟児 和春; born 1953), Japanese sumo wrestler
- Kazuharu Shoshi (所司 和晴; born 1961), Japanese shogi player
- Kazuharu Sonoda (薗田 一治; 1956–1987), Japanese professional wrestler
