= Khalil Rashid-Mohammadzadeh =

Iranian wrestler

Personal information
- Nationality: Iranian
- Born: 31 May 1953 (age 73)

Sport
- Sport: Wrestling

Khalil Rashid-Mohammadzadeh (Persian: خلیل رشید محمدزاده, born 31 May 1953) is an Iranian wrestler. He competed in the men's Greco-Roman 48 kg at the 1976 Summer Olympics.
