= Aleksander Zajączkowski =

Polish wrestler

Personal information
- Full name: Aleksander Marian Zajączkowski
- Born: 10 January 1950 (age 76) Głubczyce, Poland
- Height: 158 cm (5 ft 2 in)

Sport
- Country: Poland
- Sport: Wrestling
- Weight class: 48 kg

Aleksander Marian Zajączkowski (born 10 January 1950) is a Polish wrestler. He competed in the men's Greco-Roman 48 kg at the 1976 Summer Olympics.
