= Antonio Quistelli =

Italian wrestler

Personal information
- Nationality: Italian
- Born: 23 August 1949 Bari, Italy
- Died: 11 May 1998 (aged 48)

Sport
- Sport: Wrestling

Antonio Quistelli (23 August 1949 – 11 May 1998) was an Italian wrestler. He competed in the men's Greco-Roman 48 kg at the 1976 Summer Olympics.
