= Michael Farina =

American wrestler

Personal information
- Born: May 5, 1958 (age 68) Elmhurst, Illinois, U.S.

Sport
- Country: United States
- Sport: Wrestling
- Events: Greco-Roman and Folkstyle
- College team: Iowa State
- Team: USA

Michael Farina (born May 5, 1958) is an American wrestler. He competed in the men's Greco-Roman 48 kg at the 1976 Summer Olympics. Farina made the USA Greco-Roman wrestling Olympic team as a high school senior, becoming the second wrestler in American history to come straight from high school and earn a spot on an Olympic team. He is also the youngest American in history to become an Olympian in Greco-Roman wrestling.

Farina wrestled for York High School in Elmhurst, Illinois, where he placed third in the state as a junior and won an Illinois State Championship as a senior. Prior to graduating high school, he won the National Junior Freestyle Championship in 1974 and the National Junior Greco-Roman Championship in 1974 and 1975.

He attended college and wrestled at Iowa State University, where he graduated in 1981. He also later earned a graduate degree from the University of Minnesota.
