= Yoshite Moriwaki =

Japanese wrestler (born 1954)

Personal information
- Nationality: Japanese
- Born: 20 November 1954 (age 71)

Sport
- Sport: Wrestling

Yoshite Moriwaki (森脇 由晃, Moriwaki Yoshite; born 20 November 1954) is a Japanese wrestler. He competed in the men's Greco-Roman 48 kg at the 1976 Summer Olympics.
