= Dietmar Hinz =

German wrestler

Personal information
- Nationality: German
- Born: 14 March 1953 (age 73) Loitz, Germany

Sport
- Sport: Wrestling

Dietmar Hinz (born 14 March 1953) is a German former wrestler. He competed in the men's Greco-Roman 48 kg for East Germany at the 1976 Summer Olympics.
