= Lee In-chang =

South Korean wrestler

Personal information
- Nationality: South Korean
- Born: 24 March 1956 (age 70)

Sport
- Sport: Wrestling

Lee In-chang (born 24 March 1956) is a South Korean wrestler. He competed in the men's Greco-Roman 48 kg at the 1976 Summer Olympics.
