= Wrestling at the 1976 Summer Olympics – Men's Greco-Roman 48 kg =

Men's Greco-Roman 48 kg at the Games of the XXI Olympiad
- Venue: Maurice Richard Arena
- Dates: 20–24 July 1976
- Competitors: 15 from 15 nations

Medalists
| 1st place, gold medalist(s) | | Alexei Shumakov | Soviet Union |
| 2nd place, silver medalist(s) | | Gheorghe Berceanu | Romania |
| 3rd place, bronze medalist(s) | | Stefan Angelov | Bulgaria |

The Men's Greco-Roman 48 kg wrestling event at the 1976 Summer Olympics was held at the Maurice Richard Arena.

== Medalists ==
| Gold | Alexei Shumakov; Soviet Union |
| Silver | Gheorghe Berceanu; Romania |
| Bronze | Stefan Angelov; Bulgaria |

== Tournament results ==
The competition used a form of negative points tournament, with negative points given for any result short of a fall. Accumulation of 6 negative points eliminated the loser wrestler. When only three wrestlers remain, a special final round is used to determine the order of the medals.

Legend

- TF — Won by Fall
- IN — Won by Opponent Injury
- DQ — Won by Passivity
- D1 — Won by Passivity, the winner is passive too
- D2 — Both wrestlers lost by Passivity
- FF — Won by Forfeit
- DNA — Did not appear
- TPP — Total penalty points
- MPP — Match penalty points

Penalties

- 0 — Won by Fall, Technical Superiority, Passivity, Injury and Forfeit
- 0.5 — Won by Points, 8-11 points difference
- 1 — Won by Points, 1-7 points difference
- 2 — Won by Passivity, the winner is passive too
- 3 — Lost by Points, 1-7 points difference
- 3.5 — Lost by Points, 8-11 points difference
- 4 — Lost by Fall, Technical Superiority, Passivity, Injury and Forfeit

=== Round 1 ===
| TPP | MPP | | Score | | MPP | TPP |
|---|---|---|---|---|---|---|
| 4 | 4 | Lee In-chang (KOR) | 6 - 20 | Stefan Angelov (BUL) | 0 | 0 |
| 4 | 4 | Antonio Quistelli (ITA) | TF / 2:33 | Khalil Rashid Mohamed Zadeh (IRI) | 0 | 0 |
| 3 | 3 | Yoshite Moriwaki (JPN) | 3 - 4 | Gheorghe Berceanu (ROU) | 1 | 1 |
| 3 | 3 | Aleksander Zajączkowski (POL) | 6 - 11 | Sirvano Valdes (CUB) | 1 | 1 |
| 0 | 0 | Mitchell Kawasaki (CAN) | 17 - 1 | Byambajavyn Javkhlantögs (MGL) | 4 | 4 |
| 0 | 0 | Alexei Shumakov (URS) | DQ / 7:45 | Ferenc Seres (HUN) | 4 | 4 |
| 4 | 4 | Michael Farina (USA) | 4 - 19 | Salih Bora (TUR) | 0 | 0 |
| 0 | | Dietmar Hinz (GDR) | | Bye | | |

=== Round 2 ===
| TPP | MPP | | Score | | MPP | TPP |
|---|---|---|---|---|---|---|
| 1 | 1 | Dietmar Hinz (GDR) | 16 - 12 | Lee In-Chang (KOR) | 3 | 7 |
| 0 | 0 | Stefan Angelov (BUL) | DQ / 5:19 | Antonio Quistelli (ITA) | 4 | 8 |
| 4 | 4 | Khalil Rashid-Mohammadzadeh (IRI) | TF / 8:09 | Yoshite Moriwaki (JPN) | 0 | 3 |
| 1 | 0 | Gheorghe Berceanu (ROU) | TF / 0:20 | Aleksander Zajączkowski (POL) | 4 | 7 |
| 5 | 4 | Sirvano Valdes (CUB) | TF / 2:25 | Mitchell Kawasaki (CAN) | 0 | 0 |
| 8 | 4 | Byambajavyn Javkhlantögs (MGL) | DQ / 6:24 | Alexei Shumakov (URS) | 0 | 0 |
| 8 | 4 | Ferenc Seres (HUN) | TF / 5:10 | Michael Farina (USA) | 0 | 4 |
| 0 | | Salih Bora (TUR) | | Bye | | |

=== Round 3 ===
| TPP | MPP | | Score | | MPP | TPP |
|---|---|---|---|---|---|---|
| 3 | 3 | Salih Bora (TUR) | 18 - 22 | Dietmar Hinz (GDR) | 1 | 2 |
| 0 | 0 | Stefan Angelov (BUL) | DQ / 8:51 | Khalil Rashid-Mohammadzadeh (IRI) | 4 | 8 |
| 3 | 0 | Yoshite Moriwaki (JPN) | TF / 6:00 | Sirvano Valdes (CUB) | 4 | 9 |
| 1 | 0 | Gheorghe Berceanu (ROU) | 14 - 1 | Mitchell Kawasaki (CAN) | 4 | 4 |
| 0 | 0 | Alexei Shumakov (URS) | DQ / 5:50 | Michael Farina (USA) | 4 | 8 |

=== Round 4 ===
| TPP | MPP | | Score | | MPP | TPP |
|---|---|---|---|---|---|---|
| 7 | 4 | Salih Bora (TUR) | DQ / 8:29 | Stefan Angelov (BUL) | 0 | 0 |
| 6 | 4 | Dietmar Hinz (GDR) | TF / 2:08 | Gheorghe Berceanu (ROU) | 0 | 1 |
| 4 | 1 | Yoshite Moriwaki (JPN) | 8 - 4 | Mitchell Kawasaki (CAN) | 3 | 7 |
| 0 | | Alexei Shumakov (URS) | | Bye | | |

=== Round 5 ===
| TPP | MPP | | Score | | MPP | TPP |
|---|---|---|---|---|---|---|
| 0 | 0 | Alexei Shumakov (URS) | TF / 5:25 | Yoshite Moriwaki (JPN) | 4 | 8 |
| 3 | 3 | Stefan Angelov (BUL) | 3 - 4 | Gheorghe Berceanu (ROU) | 1 | 2 |

=== Final ===
Results from the preliminary round are carried forward into the final (shown in yellow).

| TPP | MPP | | Score | | MPP | TPP |
|---|---|---|---|---|---|---|
| | 3 | Stefan Angelov (BUL) | 3 - 4 | Gheorghe Berceanu (ROU) | 1 | |
| | 1 | Alexei Shumakov (URS) | 5 - 4 | Stefan Angelov (BUL) | 3 | 6 |
| 4 | 3 | Gheorghe Berceanu (ROU) | 6 - 10 | Alexei Shumakov (URS) | 1 | 2 |

== Final standings ==
1. Alexei Shumakov (URS)
2. Gheorghe Berceanu (ROU)
3. Stefan Angelov (BUL)
4. Yoshite Moriwaki (JPN)
5. Dietmar Hinz (GDR)
6. Mitchell Kawasaki (CAN)
7. Salih Bora (TUR)
8. Khalil Rashid-Mohammadzadeh (IRI) and Michael Farina (USA)
