= Mohieddin El-Sas =

Syrian wrestler

Personal information
- Nationality: Syrian
- Born: 2 February 1950 (age 76)

Sport
- Sport: Wrestling

Mohieddin El-Sas (Arabic: محي الدين الساس; born 2 February 1950) is a Syrian wrestler. He competed in the men's Greco-Roman 48 kg at the 1972 Summer Olympics, losing one match and withdrawing from a second match.
