= Mitchell Kawasaki =

Canadian wrestler and judoka

Personal information
- Born: 4 March 1950 (age 76) Hamilton, Ontario, Canada
- Occupation: Judoka

Sport
- Sport: Wrestling; Judo
- Rank: 8th dan black belt
- Club: Kawasaki Rendokan Judo Academy

Mitchell Kawasaki (born 4 March 1950) is a Canadian wrestler and judoka. He competed in the men's Greco-Roman 48 kg at the 1976 Summer Olympics, and represented Canada at the World Judo Championships in 1971 and 1973. He is currently the chief instructor of Kawasaki Rendokan Judo Academy in Hamilton, Ontario, founded by his father Masao Kawasaki in 1958, and has held numerous positions in Judo Ontario and Judo Canada.

== See also ==
- Judo in Ontario
- Judo in Canada
- List of Canadian judoka
- Wrestling in Canada
