= Sirvano Valdes =

Cuban wrestler (born 1953)

Personal information
- Nationality: Cuban
- Born: 30 March 1953 (age 73)

Sport
- Sport: Wrestling

Sirvano Valdes (born 30 March 1953) is a Cuban wrestler. He competed in the men's Greco-Roman 48 kg at the 1976 Summer Olympics.
