= Byambajavyn Javkhlantögs =

Mongolian wrestler

Personal information
- Nationality: Mongolian
- Born: 23 October 1959 (age 66)

Sport
- Sport: Wrestling

Byambajavyn Javkhlantögs (born 23 October 1959) is a Mongolian wrestler. He competed in the men's Greco-Roman 48 kg at the 1976 Summer Olympics.
