= Gordon Bertie =

Canadian freestyle wrestler

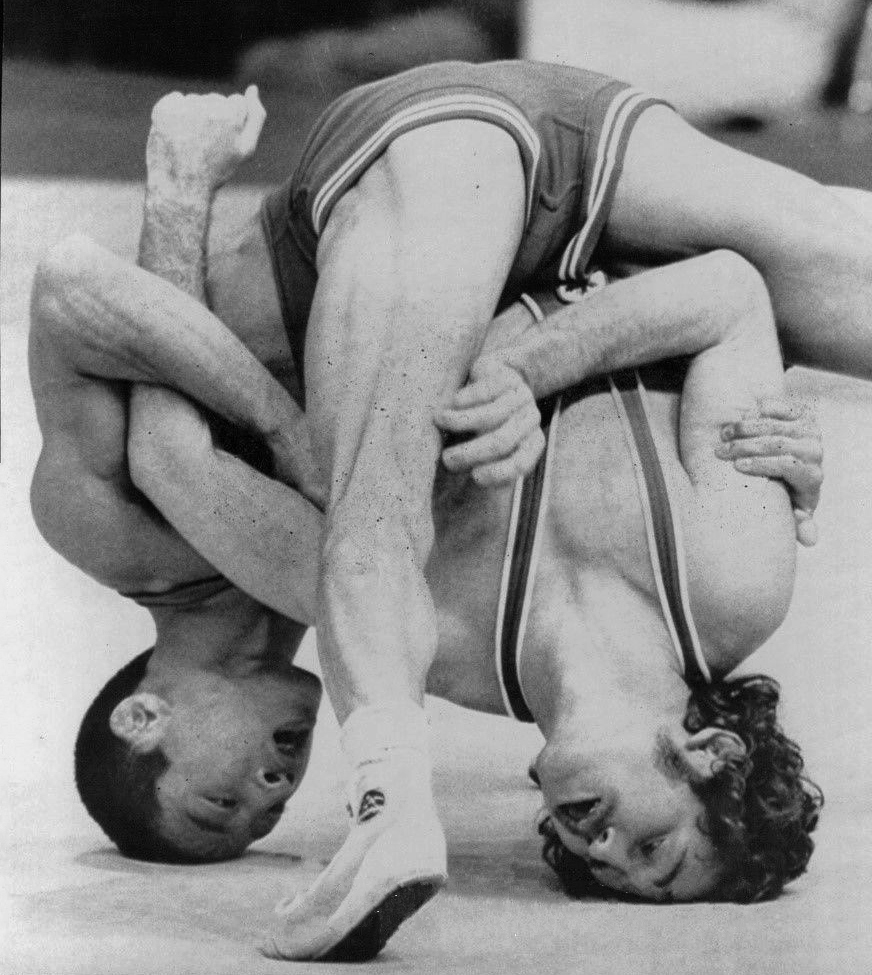
- Bertie (right) vs. Kato at the 1972 Olympics

Personal information
- Born: 20 August 1948 (age 77) Saint-Gabriel-de-Brandon, Quebec, Canada
- Height: 165 cm (5 ft 5 in)
- Weight: 52 kg (115 lb)

Sport
- Sport: Freestyle wrestling
Medal record
Representing Canada
World Wrestling Championships
Bronze medal – third place	1974 Istanbul	-48 kg
Commonwealth Games
Silver medal – second place	1974 Christchurch	-52 kg

Gordon Bertie (born 20 August 1948) is a Canadian retired flyweight freestyle wrestler who won the world cup in 1975, and placed second in 1976. Earlier in 1974 he won a silver medal at the British Commonwealth Games and a bronze at the world championships. Bertie competed at the 1972 and 1976 Summer Olympics and placed sixth in 1972. At the Pan American Games he finished fourth in 1975 and fifth in 1971.
