= Sotiris Ventas =

Greek wrestler

Personal information
- Nationality: Greek
- Born: 15 March 1945 (age 81)

Sport
- Sport: Wrestling

Sotiris Ventas (born 15 March 1945) is a Greek wrestler. He competed in the men's Greco-Roman 48 kg at the 1972 Summer Olympics.
