= Wayne Holmes =

American wrestler

Personal information
- Born: July 29, 1950 (age 76) Columbus, Ohio, U.S.

Sport
- Country: United States
- Sport: Wrestling
- Event: Greco-Roman
- College team: Ohio State
- Club: Ohio Wrestling Club
- Team: USA

Wayne Holmes (born July 29, 1950) is an American wrestler. He competed in the men's Greco-Roman 48 kg at the 1972 Summer Olympics.
