= John Kinsela =

Australian wrestler (1949–2020)

John Kinsela OAM
Personal information
- Born: John Francis Kinsela; 27 May 1949 Surry Hills, Sydney, New South Wales
- Died: 9 November 2020 (aged 71)

Sport
- Country: Australia
- Sport: Wrestling

John Francis Kinsela OAM (27 May 1949 – 9 November 2020) was an Australian indigenous wrestler who competed in the 1968 Summer Olympics and in the 1972 Summer Olympics.

Kinsela was born in the inner-Sydney neighbourhood of Surry Hills, New South Wales, his father a Wiradjuri and his mother Jawoyn. He grew up in the neighbouring suburb of Redfern, New South Wales. At the age of 14 Kinsela left school to work in a sock factory.

Between the Mexico City and Munich Olympic Games, Kinsela was conscripted into the Australian Army, serving in the Royal Australian Artillery. In 1970 Kinsela was sent to the Vietnam War with 106 Battery, 4th Field Regiment at Nui Dat. After his retirement from wrestling, Kinsela rejoined the Australian Army serving in the 1st Commando Regiment for six years. Kinsela excelled as a Commando, winning the "Commando of the Year" award in 1981.

Kinsela suffered from post traumatic stress disorder and in 2001 suffered a mental breakdown. After successful treatment, Kinsela returned to community life, serving on the board of Wrestling NSW and acting as the chairperson of a community sentencing program for indigenous offenders in the western Sydney suburb of Mount Druitt.

Kinsella was awarded the Medal of the Order of Australia in the 2017 Queen's Birthday Honours for his contribution to both wrestling and youth.
