= Gheorghe Berceanu =

Romanian Greco-Roman wrestler (1949–2022)

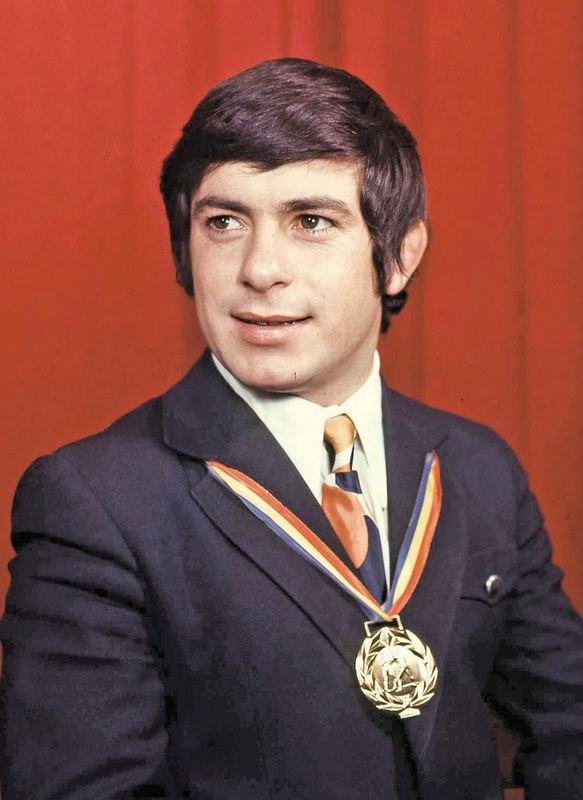

Personal information
- Born: 28 December 1949 Cârna, Romania
- Died: 30 August 2022 (aged 72) Slatina, Romania
- Height: 150 cm (4 ft 11 in)

Sport
- Sport: Greco-Roman wrestling
- Club: Electroputere Craiova; CSA Steaua București
Medal record
Men's Greco-Roman wrestling
Representing Romania
Olympic Games
Gold medal – first place	1972 Munich	48 kg
Silver medal – second place	1976 Montreal	48 kg
World Championships
Gold medal – first place	1969 Mar del Plata	48 kg
Gold medal – first place	1970 Edmonton	48 kg
Silver medal – second place	1975 Minsk	48 kg
European Championships
Gold medal – first place	1970 Berlin	48 kg
Gold medal – first place	1972 Katowice	48 kg
Gold medal – first place	1973 Helsinki	48 kg
Summer Universiade
Gold medal – first place	1973 Moscow	48 kg

Gheorghe Berceanu (28 December 1949 – 30 August 2022) was a Romanian light-flyweight Greco-Roman wrestler. He won the world title in 1969 and 1972, the European title in 1970, 1972, and 1973, and an Olympic gold medal in 1972 in Munich and a silver in 1976 in Montreal. Berceanu spent most of his career at Steaua București, and later worked there as a coach.

Berceanu died on 30 August 2022, at the age of 72.
