= Andrzej Kudelski =

Polish wrestler

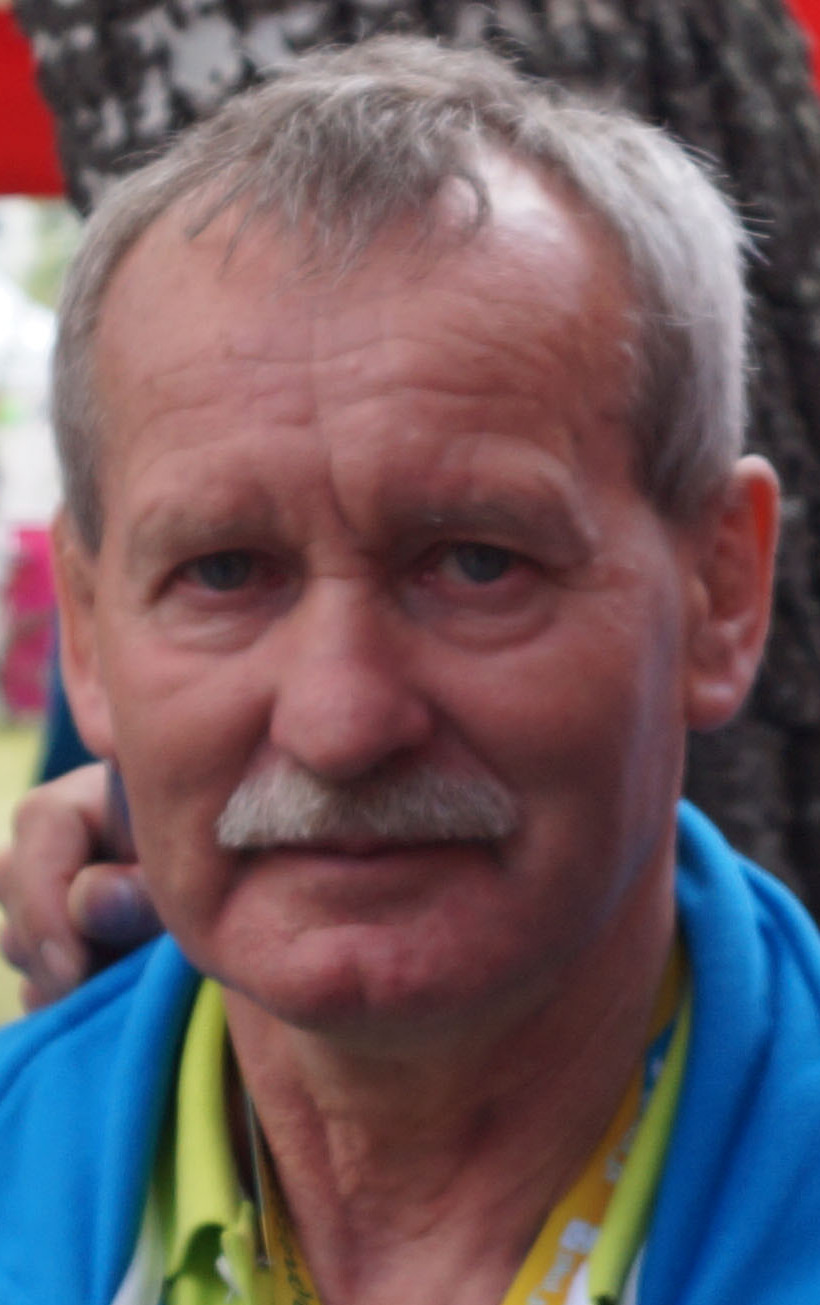
- Kudelski in 2016

Personal information
- Born: 14 February 1952 (age 74) Warsaw, Poland
- Height: 162 cm (5 ft 4 in)
Medal record
Men's freestyle wrestling
Representing Poland
European Championships
Bronze medal – third place	1979 Bucharest	52 kg

Andrzej Kudelski (born 14 February 1952 in Warsaw) is a Polish former wrestler who competed in the 1972 Summer Olympics.
