= Mohamed El-Malky Ragheb =

Egyptian wrestler

Personal information
- Native name: محمد المالكي راغب
- Nationality: Egyptian
- Born: 23 July 1953 (age 73) Al-Gharbiyah, Egypt
- Height: 155 cm (5 ft 1 in)

Sport
- Country: Egypt
- Sport: Greco-Roman wrestling
- Weight class: 48 kg (106 lb)
Medal record
Mediterranean Games
| Silver medal – second place | 1975 Algiers | Greco-Roman -48 kg |

Mohamed El-Malky Ragheb (Arabic: محمد المالكي راغب, born 23 July 1953) is an Egyptian wrestler. He competed in the men's Greco-Roman 48 kg at the 1972 Summer Olympics.
