= Bernd Drechsel =

German wrestler (1953–2017)

Bernd Drechsel (28 October 1953 – 21 January 2017) was a German wrestler who competed in the 1972 Summer Olympics. He was born in Karl-Marx-Stadt.
