= Pedro Piñeda =

Guatemalan wrestler

Pedro Piñeda (born 3 December 1954) is a Guatemalan former wrestler who competed in the 1972 Summer Olympics.
