= Adkar Maruti =

Indian wrestler (born 1950)

Adkar Maruti (born 15 February 1950) is an Indian former wrestler who competed in the 1972 Summer Olympics.
