= Ion Arapu =

Romanian wrestler (born 1951)

Ion Arapu (born 17 May 1951) is a Romanian former wrestler who competed in the 1972 Summer Olympics.
