= Mario Sabatini =

German wrestler

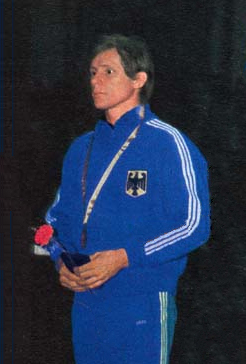
- Sabatini in 1970

Personal information
- Born: 20 January 1943 (age 83) Freiburg im Breisgau, Germany
- Height: 160 cm (5 ft 3 in)
- Weight: 55 kg (121 lb)

Sport
- Sport: Freestyle wrestling
- Club: AV Germania Freiburg-St. Georgen, Freiburg im Breisgau

Mario Sabatini (born 20 January 1943) is a retired German freestyle wrestler. He placed fourth-fifth at the European championships in 1972–1974 and competed at the 1972 Summer Olympics.
