= Kim Gwong-hyong =

North Korean wrestler (born 1946)

- Hangul: 김광형
- RR: Gim Gwanghyeong
- MR: Kim Kwanghyŏng

Kim Gwong-hyong
Medal record

Men's freestyle wrestling

Representing North Korea

Olympic Games
Bronze medal – third place	1972 Munich	flyweight

Kim Gwong-hyong (born 1 March 1946) is a Korean former wrestler who won a bronze medal in the 1972 Summer Olympics. He weighed 115 lbs.
