= Attila Laták =

Hungarian wrestler (1945–1991)

Attila Laták (9 September 1945 – 8 December 1991) was a Hungarian wrestler who competed in the 1972 Summer Olympics.
