= Osman Duraliev =

Bulgarian freestyle wrestler

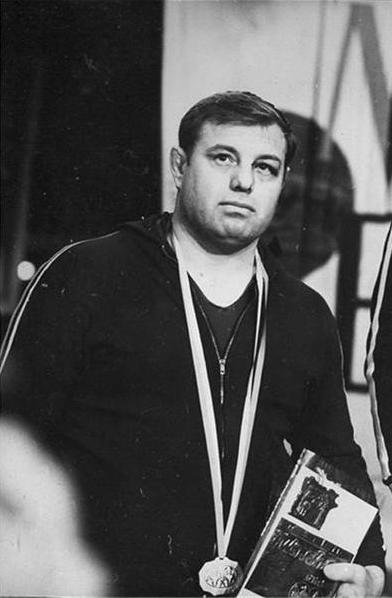
- Duraliev in 1971

Personal information
- Born: 15 January 1939 Vladimirovtsi, Razgrad, Bulgaria
- Died: 25 April 2011 (aged 72) Istanbul, Turkey
- Height: 185 cm (6 ft 1 in)
- Weight: 125 kg (276 lb)

Sport
- Sport: Freestyle wrestling
- Club: Ludogorez Razgrad
Medal record
Men's freestyle wrestling
Representing Bulgaria
Olympic Games
Silver medal – second place	1968 Mexico City	+97 kg
Silver medal – second place	1972 Munich	+100 kg
World Championships
Silver medal – second place	1967 Delhi	+97 kg
Silver medal – second place	1969 Mar del Plata	+100 kg
Silver medal – second place	1970 Edmonton	+100 kg
Silver medal – second place	1971 Sofia	+100 kg
European Championships
Silver medal – second place	1967 Istanbul	+97 kg
Silver medal – second place	1968 Sofia	+97 kg
Silver medal – second place	1969 Skopje	+100 kg
Silver medal – second place	1972 Katowice	+100 kg

Osman Duraliev (Bulgarian: Осман Дуралиев; 15 January 1939 – 25 April 2011) was a Bulgarian freestyle wrestler with Turkish origin. Between 1967 and 1972 he won ten silver medals at major international competitions, including the 1968 and 1972 Summer Olympics. In eight of them he lost the final to Aleksandr Medved. He came close to winning at the 1971 World Championships in Sofia, where he led the match 4:3 with 43 seconds left. Yet Medved equalized the score and won the title because of his lower body weight.

In 1989 Duraliev immigrated to Turkey, where he died aged 72.
