= Rafik Ben Amor =

Tunisian volleyball player (born 1952)

Personal information
- Nationality: Tunisian
- Born: 18 November 1952 (age 72)

Sport
- Sport: Volleyball

Rafik Ben Amor (born 18 November 1952) is a Tunisian volleyball player. He competed in the men's tournament at the 1972 Summer Olympics.
