= Petru Ciarnău =

Romanian wrestler

Petru Ciarnău (born 5 August 1943) is a Romanian former wrestler who competed in the 1972 Summer Olympics and in the 1980 Summer Olympics.
