= Florentino Martínez =

Mexican wrestler (born 1944)

Florentino Martínez (born 4 July 1944) is a Mexican former wrestler who competed in the 1968 Summer Olympics and in the 1972 Summer Olympics.
