= István Maróthy =

Hungarian wrestler (1943–2023)

István Maróthy (20 April 1943 – 8 June 2023) was a Hungarian wrestler who competed in the 1972 Summer Olympics. Maróthy died in June 2023, at the age of 80.
