= Mohammad Arref =

Afghan wrestler

Mohammad Arref (born 1950) is an Afghan former wrestler. He competed for Afghanistan in the 1972 Summer Olympics.
