= Willi Bock =

German wrestler

Willi Bock (born 13 December 1946, in Kötzlin) is a German former wrestler who competed in the 1972 Summer Olympics.
