= Aleksandr Medved =

Soviet/Belarussian wrestler (1937–2024)

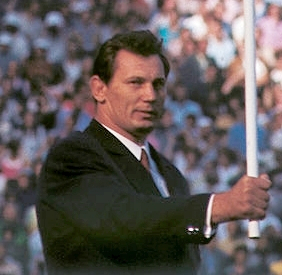
- Medved at the Opening Ceremony of the 1972 Olympics

Personal information
- Born: 16 September 1937 Bila Tserkva, Kyiv Oblast, Ukrainian SSR, USSR
- Died: 2 September 2024 (aged 86) Minsk, Belarus
- Height: 190 cm (6 ft 3 in)
- Weight: 104 kg (229 lb)

Sport
- Sport: Freestyle wrestling
- Club: Burevestnik Minsk
Medal record
Men's freestyle wrestling
Representing Soviet Union
Olympic Games
Gold medal – first place	1964 Tokyo	97 kg
Gold medal – first place	1968 Mexico City	+97 kg
Gold medal – first place	1972 Munich	+100 kg
World Championships
Gold medal – first place	1962 Toledo	97 kg
Gold medal – first place	1963 Sofia	97 kg
Gold medal – first place	1966 Toledo	97 kg
Gold medal – first place	1967 New Delhi	+97 kg
Gold medal – first place	1969 Mar del Plata	+100 kg
Gold medal – first place	1970 Edmonton	+100 kg
Gold medal – first place	1971 Sofia	+100 kg
Silver medal – second place	1965 Manchester	97 kg
Bronze medal – third place	1961 Yokohama	+87 kg
European Championships
Gold medal – first place	1966 Karlsruhe	+97 kg
Gold medal – first place	1968 Sofia	+97 kg
Gold medal – first place	1972 Katowice	+100 kg

Aleksandr Vasilyevich Medved (Russian: Александр Васильевич Медведь; Belarusian: Аляксандр Васілевіч Мядзведзь; 16 September 1937 – 2 September 2024) was a Ukrainian-born Soviet Belarusian freestyle wrestler who competed for the Soviet Union and was named "one of the greatest wrestlers in history" by FILA, the sport's governing body. Between 1962 and 1972 he won three Olympic gold medals, seven world and three European titles. He served as the Olympic flag bearer for the Soviet Union in 1972, for Belarus in 2004 and recited the Judge's Oath at the Opening Ceremony of the 1980 Olympics.

== Biography ==
According to Medved, his grandparents came from Russia; his grandmother was ca. 195 cm, and his grandfather was even taller. Medved was smaller, at 190 cm and 100+ kg, yet big enough to fit into his last name, which means bear in Russian (and with minor variations in Slavic languages).

Between 1967 and 1972 Medved had a rivalry with Turkish-Bulgarian wrestler Osman Duraliev. They met eight times in the finals of major international championships and Medved won on all occasions. He was close to losing at the 1971 World Championships in Sofia, where Duraliev led the match 4:3 with 43 seconds left. Yet Medved equalized the score and won the title because of his lower body weight.

After retiring from competitions in 1972 Medved moved to Belarus, where prior he served with the Soviet Army in the late 1950s. There he worked as a national coach and lectured at the Belarusian State University of Informatics and Radioelectronics. After the dissolution of the Soviet Union he was appointed as vice-president of the Belarus Olympic Committee and of the Belarus Wrestling Federation. Previously he was awarded the Order of Lenin (1964), Order of the Red Banner of Labour (1970), and Order of the Badge of Honour (1964, 1969, 1985). In 2001 he was chosen as the best Belarusian athlete of the 20th century and in 2003 became one of the first 10 inductees to the FILA International Wrestling Hall of Fame. He is an honored citizen of Minsk, where since 1970s an annual wrestling tournament is held in his honor.

Medved was married to Tatyana, they had a daughter Yelena and son Aleksei. Yelena was a Belarusian tennis champion, while Aleksei won a junior world title in wrestling in 1987.

Medved died in Minsk on 2 September 2024, at the age of 86.

Olympic Games
Preceded by Leonid Zhabotinsky	Flagbearer for Soviet Union; Munich 1972	Succeeded by Vasily Alekseyev
