= Kim Young-jun (wrestler) =

South Korean wrestler (born 1948)

Personal information
- Nationality: South Korean
- Born: 21 March 1948 (age 77)

Korean name
- Hangul: 김영준
- RR: Gim Yeongjun
- MR: Kim Yŏngjun

Kim Young-jun (born 21 March 1948) is a South Korean former wrestler who competed in the 1972 Summer Olympics.
