= Oldřich Vlasák (wrestler) =

Czech former wrestler (born 1949)

Oldřich Vlasák (born 12 November 1949) is a Czech former wrestler who competed in the 1972 Summer Olympics.
