= Bernard Szczepański =

Polish wrestler (1945–2018)

Bernard Szczepański (11 October 1945 – 21 September 2018) was a Polish wrestler who competed in the 1972 Summer Olympics.
