= Raimo Hirvonen =

Finnish wrestler

Raimo Hirvonen (born 17 January 1950) is a Finnish former wrestler who competed in the 1972 Summer Olympics. He spent time in prison for violent crimes and robbery.
