= Sergio Gonzalez (wrestler) =

American wrestler (born 1947)

Sergio Gonzales
Personal information
- Born: October 18, 1947 Hawthorne, California, U.S.

Sport
- Country: United States
- Sport: Wrestling
- Events: Freestyle and Folkstyle
- College team: UCLA
- Team: USA
Medal record
Collegiate Wrestling
Representing the UCLA Bruins
NCAA Division I Championships
Silver medal – second place	1968 State College	115 lb
Silver medal – second place	1969 Provo	115 lb

Sergio Gonzales (born October 18, 1947) is an American former wrestler who competed in the 1972 Summer Olympics in freestyle wrestling for the United States. He was also a two-time NCAA wrestling runner-up for the UCLA Bruins.
