= Petar Krumov (wrestler) =

Bulgarian wrestler

Personal information
- Nationality: Bulgarian
- Born: 18 September 1941 (age 84) Sofia, Bulgaria

Sport
- Sport: Wrestling

Petar Krumov (born 18 September 1941) is a Bulgarian wrestler. He competed in the men's Greco-Roman 87 kg at the 1968 Summer Olympics and was the 1969 world champion in his event.
