= Hızır Sarı =

Turkish wrestler (born 1951)

Hızır Sarı (born 19 February 1951) is a Turkish former wrestler who competed in the 1972 Summer Olympics.
