= Lennart Svensson (wrestler) =

Swedish wrestler

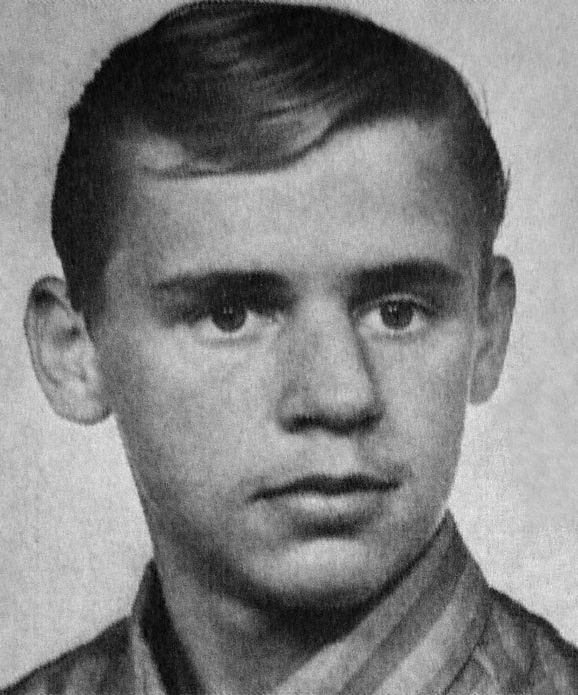

Personal information
- Born: 14 August 1950 (age 74); Falkenberg. Sweden

Sport
- Sport: Greco-Roman wrestling
- Club: BK Herkules

Jan Lennart Svensson (born 14 August 1950) is a retired Greco-Roman wrestler from Sweden who competed in the 48 kg division at the 1972 Summer Olympics. He won the Nordic championships in 1972, placing second in 1969 and third in 1973. He finished sixth at the 1972 European Championships.
