= Lorenzo Calafiore =

Italian wrestler (1935–2011)

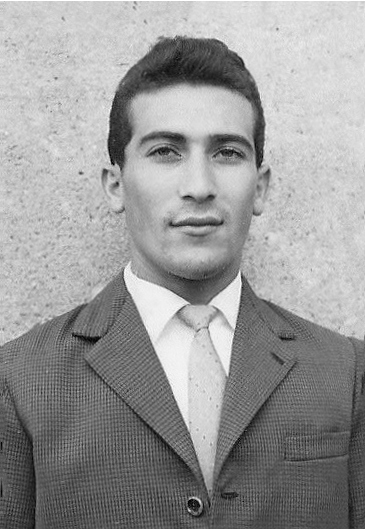

Personal information
- Born: 31 January 1935 Reggio Calabria, Italy
- Died: 20 October 2011 (aged 76) Moncalieri, Italy
- Height: 1.45 m (4 ft 9 in)
- Weight: 48 kg (106 lb)

Sport
- Sport: Greco-Roman wrestling
- Club: FIAT Torino
Medal record
Representing Italy
European Championships
Silver medal – second place	1969 Modena	-48 kg
Bronze medal – third place	1970 Berlin	-48 kg
Mediterranean Games
Gold medal – first place	1971 İzmir	-48 kg

Lorenzo Calafiore (31 January 1935 – 20 October 2011) was a Greco-Roman wrestler from Italy who won two medals at the European championships of 1969–1970. He competed at the 1972 Summer Olympics, aged 37, and finished in sixth place.

== Biography ==
His father Francis died of a heart attack when Calafiore was a few months old. Soon after that his mother, Josephine Agostini, married Antonio Mauro, a widower with four children. The pair later had ten more children. Calafiore took up wrestling aged 20; at 26 he won his first national title and was included to the national team. On 2 May 1965 he married Catherine Logiudice; they had two children, Francis (born 1966) and Giuseppina (born 1969). Calafiore retired from competitions in 1974, and two years later started working as a coach. He retired for good in 2000 to help raising his grandchildren. He died of a heart attack in 2011.
