= Roman Dmitriev =

Russian wrestler and politician (1949–2010)

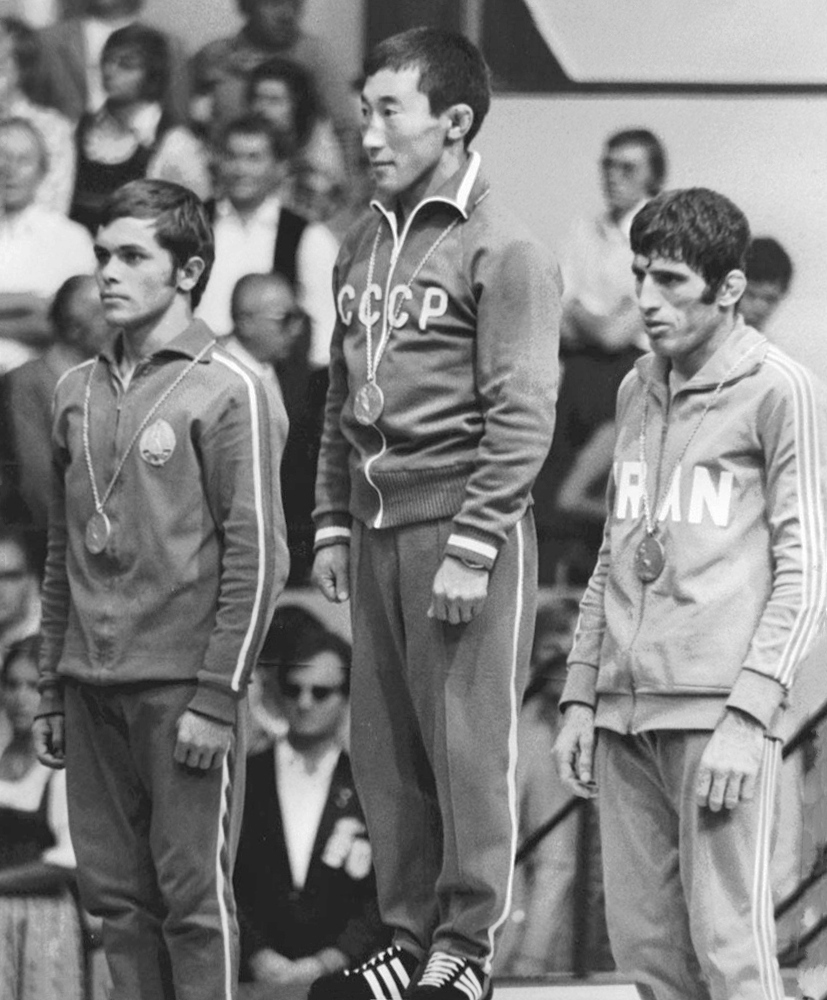
- Dmitriev (center) at the 1972 Olympics

Personal information
- Born: 7 March 1949 Zhigansky District, Yakut ASSR, Russian SFSR, Soviet Union
- Died: 11 February 2010 (aged 60) Moscow, Russia
- Height: 154 cm (5 ft 1 in)

Sport
- Sport: Freestyle wrestling
- Club: CSKA Moscow
- Coached by: Dimitri Gorkin; Sergey Preobrashensky
Medal record
Representing the Soviet Union
Olympic Games
Gold medal – first place	1972 Munich	48 kg
Silver medal – second place	1976 Montreal	48 kg
World Championships
Gold medal – first place	1973 Tehran	48 kg
Silver medal – second place	1969 Mar del Plata	48 kg
Silver medal – second place	1974 Istanbul	52 kg
Bronze medal – third place	1970 Edmonton	48 kg
European Championships
Gold medal – first place	1969 Sofia	48 kg
Bronze medal – third place	1981 Łódź	48 kg
Summer Universiade
Silver medal – second place	1977 Sofia	52 kg

Roman Mikhaylovich Dmitriev (Russian: Роман Михайлович Дмитриев; 7 March 1949 – 11 February 2010) was a Russian freestyle wrestler, coach and politician of Yakut heritage. He competed at the 1972 and 1976 Olympics and won a gold and a silver medal, respectively. Between 1969 and 1974 he won four medals at world championships, including a gold in 1973; he was also a European champion in 1969. Domestically Dmitriev won the Soviet championships in 1969, 1971, 1972, 1976, 1979 and 1981.

In 1981 Dmitriev retired from competitions to become a coach of Soviet senior and then junior wrestling teams. He also took various positions at the Russian Wrestling Federation. In 2008 he was elected to the Duma of Sakha Republic. He died in Moscow in 2010.
