= Ali Rıza Alan =

Turkish wrestler

Ali Rıza Alan (born 3 February 1947 in Tokat, Turkey) is a Turkish former wrestler who competed in the 1972 Summer Olympics.
