= Kiyomi Kato (wrestler) =

Japanese freestyle wrestler

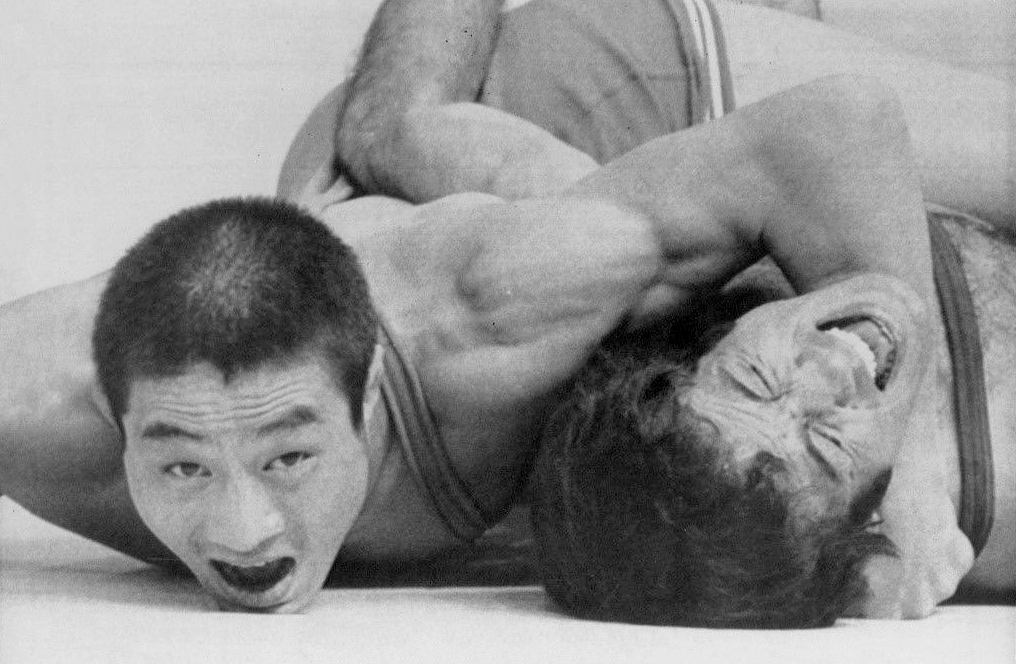
- Kato (left) vs. Ghorbani at the 1972 Olympics

Personal information
- Born: August 20, 1948 (age 77) Asahikawa, Japan
- Height: 163 cm (5 ft 4 in)
- Weight: 52 kg (115 lb)

Sport
- Sport: Freestyle wrestling
- Club: Sanshin Electronics Corporation
Medal record
Men's freestyle wrestling
Representing Japan
Olympic Games
Gold medal – first place	1972 Munich	52 kg
Asian Games
Silver medal – second place	1970 Bangkok	52 kg

Kiyomi Kato (加藤 喜代美, Katō Kiyomi; born March 8, 1948) is a retired Japanese flyweight freestyle wrestler. He won a gold medal at the 1972 Olympics and a silver medal at the 1970 Asian Games and placed sixth at the 1971 World Wrestling Championships.

Kato lost to Mohammad Ghorbani at the 1970 Asian Games, but took revenge at the 1972 Olympics.
