= Günther Maas =

German wrestler

Günther Maas (born 15 November 1941 in Elm, Germany) is a German former wrestler who competed in the 1972 Summer Olympics.
