= Abdollah Movahed =

Iranian freestyle wrestler (1940–2026)

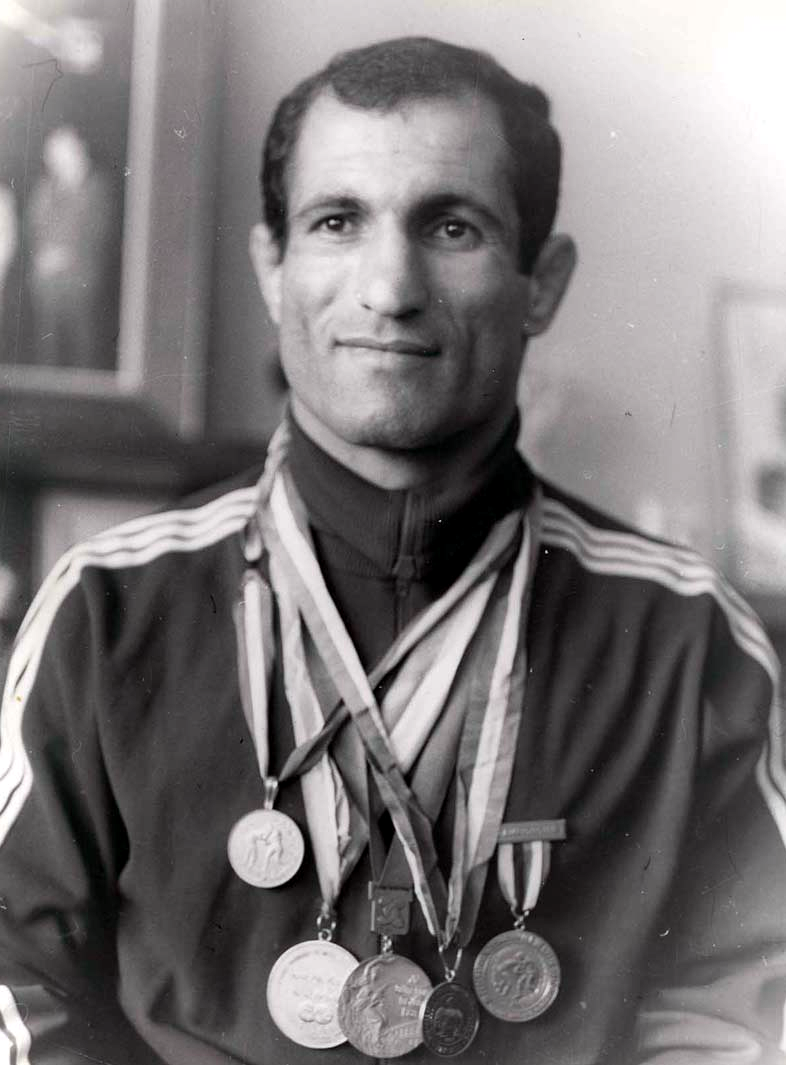
- Movahed in 1969

Personal information
- Nationality: Iranian
- Born: March 2, 1940 Babolsar, Iran
- Died: April 30, 2026 (aged 86) Fairfax, Virginia, United States
- Height: 172 cm (5 ft 8 in)

Sport
- Sport: Freestyle wrestling
Medal record
Representing Iran
Olympic Games
| Gold medal – first place | 1968 Mexico City | 70 kg |
World Championships
| Gold medal – first place | 1965 Manchester | 70 kg |
| Gold medal – first place | 1966 Toledo | 70 kg |
| Gold medal – first place | 1967 New Delhi | 70 kg |
| Gold medal – first place | 1969 Mar del Plata | 68 kg |
| Gold medal – first place | 1970 Edmonton | 68 kg |
Asian Games
| Gold medal – first place | 1966 Bangkok | 70 kg |
| Gold medal – first place | 1970 Bangkok | 68 kg |

Abdollah Movahed Ardabili (Persian: عبدالله موحد اردبیلی, March 20, 1940 – April 30, 2026) was an Iranian lightweight freestyle wrestler. He competed at the 1964, 1968, and 1972 Olympics and won a gold medal in 1968. Movahed served as flag bearer for Iran at the Opening Ceremony of the 1970 Asian Games, and won a gold medal a few days later.

== Background ==
Movahed's father was a teacher who moved from Ardabil to Babolsar during the reign of Reza Shah. He later changed his name from Mojtaba Fazlizadeh to Mojtaba Movahed Ardabili, and married a woman from Bandar-e Anzali. They had three daughters and six sons, the first being born in 1926. Mojtaba died in 1944, and the elder brothers became heads of the family and looked after young Abdollah. Around 1957, they moved the family to Tehran.

== Career ==
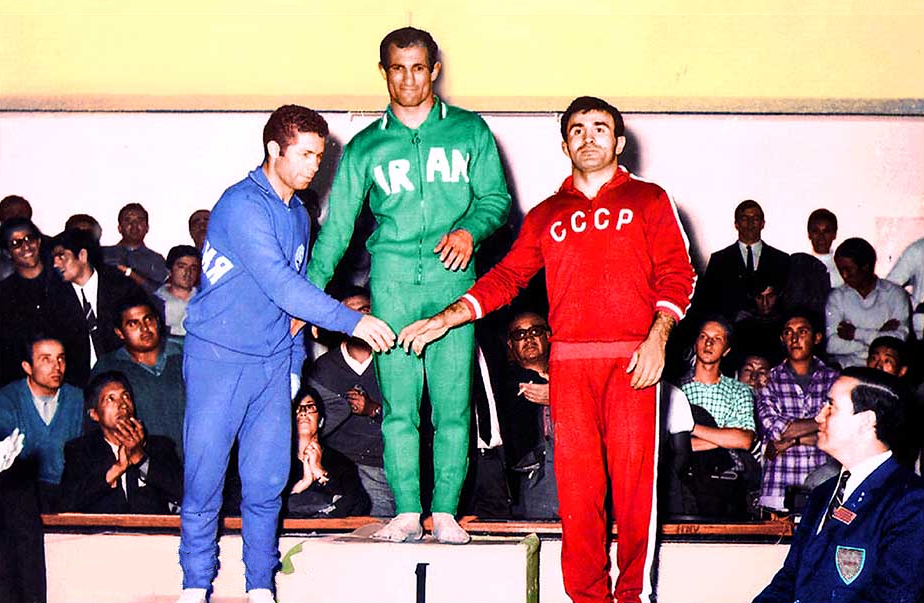
Medal winners of 1969 World Wrestling Championships, freestyle 68 kg. From left to right, Enyu Valchev, Abdollah Movahed and Nodar Khokhashvili

While living in Babolsar Movahed trained in gymnastics, volleyball, and swimming. In Tehran he continued playing volleyball and took up weightlifting, but stopped due to a bout of hepatitis. After recovering he changed to wrestling upon advice from his brother Mehdi. Abdollah began competing in 1959, and next year participated in the Iranian Olympic Trials. Coaches soon noted Movahed's technical prowess, and believed that with the proper conditioning, he had the potential to be a world champion. Their suspicions were confirmed: between 1965 and 1970 Movahed won every major contest that he entered.

The highlight of Movahed's career was the 1968 Olympics in Mexico, where he won the gold medal. At the 1972 Games he injured his shoulder in the early rounds, and did not advance to the final. Movahed later moved to the United States, but refused to train American wrestlers because they might face Iranian opponents in international tournaments. He was inducted into the FILA wrestling hall of fame. He lived in the U.S. city of Fairfax, Virginia.

== Death ==
Movahed died on April 30, 2026, at the age of 86, after suffering a heart attack.
