= Stefan Angelov =

Bulgarian wrestler (1947–2019)

Medal record

Men's Greco-Roman wrestling

Representing Bulgaria

Olympic Games
| Bronze medal – third place | 1972 Munich | light-flyweight |
| Bronze medal – third place | 1976 Montreal | light-flyweight |

Stefan Angelov (7 January 1947 – 20 December 2019) was a Bulgarian wrestler who competed in the 1972 Summer Olympics and in the 1976 Summer Olympics.
