= Stanisław Makowiecki =

Polish wrestler

Stanisław Makowiecki (7 November 1942 – 4 February 2015) was a Polish wrestler who competed in the 1972 Summer Olympics. He was born in Siennów.
