= Bazarragchaagiin Jamsran =

Mongolian wrestler

Personal information
- Native name: Базаррагчаагийн Жамсран
- Nationality: Mongolia
- Born: 12 December 1950 (age 75) Galt, Khövsgöl, Mongolia
- Height: 154 cm (5 ft 1 in)

Sport
- Country: Mongolia
- Sport: Wrestling
- Weight class: 48 kg
- Event: Freestyle
Medal record
Men's freestyle wrestling
Representing Mongolia
World Championships
Silver medal – second place	1971 Sofia	48 kg

Bazarragchaagiin Jamsran (born 12 December 1950) is a Mongolian former wrestler who competed in the 1972 Summer Olympics.
