= Habib Dlimi =

Tunisian wrestler

Personal information
- Nationality: Tunisian
- Born: 21 May 1950 (age 76)

Sport
- Sport: Wrestling

Habib Dlimi (born 21 May 1950) is a Tunisian wrestler. He competed in the men's Greco-Roman 48 kg at the 1972 Summer Olympics.
