= Peter Germer =

German wrestler (born 1949)

Peter Germer (born 26 September 1949) is a German former wrestler who competed in the 1972 Summer Olympics.
