= Sefer Baygın =

Turkish wrestler (1942–2026)

Personal information
- Nationality: Turkish
- Born: 6 February 1942
- Died: January 2026 (aged 83)
- Weight: 48 kg (106 lb; 7 st 8 lb)

Sport
- Country: Turkey
Medal record
European Championships
Gold medal – first place	1972 Katowice	48 kg

Sefer Baygın (6 February 1942 – January 2026) was a Turkish wrestler who won the 1972 European Wrestling Championships and competed in the 1972 Summer Olympics.

- 1969 European Wrestling Championships
- 1971 Mediterranean Games Champion

Baygın died in January 2026, at the age of 83.
