= Kazuharu Ishida =

Japanese wrestler (born 1948)

Kazuharu Ishida (石田 和春, Ishida Kazuharu; born 8 April 1948) is a Japanese former wrestler who competed in the 1972 Summer Olympics.
