= Rahim Aliabadi =

Iranian Greco-Roman wrestler (born 1943)

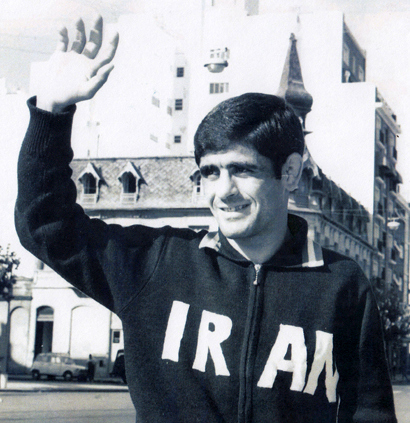

Personal information
- Born: 22 March 1943 (age 83) Ardabil, Iran
- Height: 158 cm (5 ft 2 in)

Sport
- Sport: Greco-Roman wrestling
- Coached by: Mohammad Paziraei
Medal record
Representing Iran
Olympic Games
Silver medal – second place	1972 Munich	48 kg
World Championships
Silver medal – second place	1969 Mar del Plata	48 kg
Bronze medal – third place	1973 Tehran	52 kg
Asian Games
Gold medal – first place	1974 Tehran	48 kg

Rahim Aliabadi (Persian: رحیم علی‌آبادی; born 22 March 1943) is a retired Greco-Roman wrestler from Iran. He won a gold medal at the 1974 Asian Games and silver medals at the 1972 Olympics and 1969 World Championships.
