= Ebrahim Javadi =

Iranian freestyle wrestler

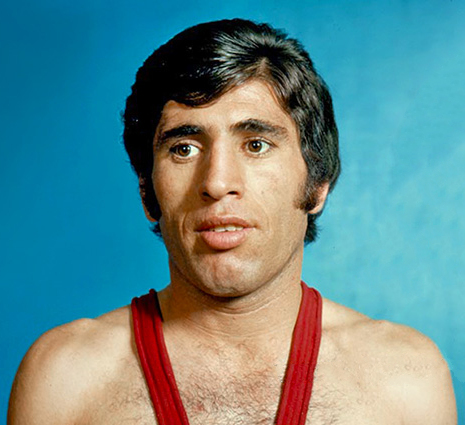
- Javadi in 1973

Personal information
- Born: 28 July 1943 (age 82) Qazvin, Iran
- Height: 160 cm (5 ft 3 in)

Sport
- Sport: Freestyle wrestling
Medal record
Representing Iran
Olympic Games
Bronze medal – third place	1972 Munich	48 kg
World Championships
Gold medal – first place	1969 Mar del Plata	48 kg
Gold medal – first place	1970 Edmonton	48 kg
Gold medal – first place	1971 Sofia	48 kg
Gold medal – first place	1973 Tehran	52 kg
Asian Games
Gold medal – first place	1970 Bangkok	48 kg
Gold medal – first place	1974 Tehran	52 kg

Ebrahim Javadipour (Persian: ابراهيم جوادی‌پور, born 28 July 1943) is a retired Iranian freestyle wrestler. He won a world title in 1969, 1970, 1971 and 1973 and a gold medal at the Asian Games in 1970 and 1974, but placed third at the 1972 Olympics. He is listed in the FILA wrestling hall of fame.

Javadi was born in Qazvin, but spent a few of his early years in Tehran, where his father worked for the Ministry of Labor. Javadi was an active child and tried various sports, eventually choosing wrestling because it fitted best to his relatively small body size.

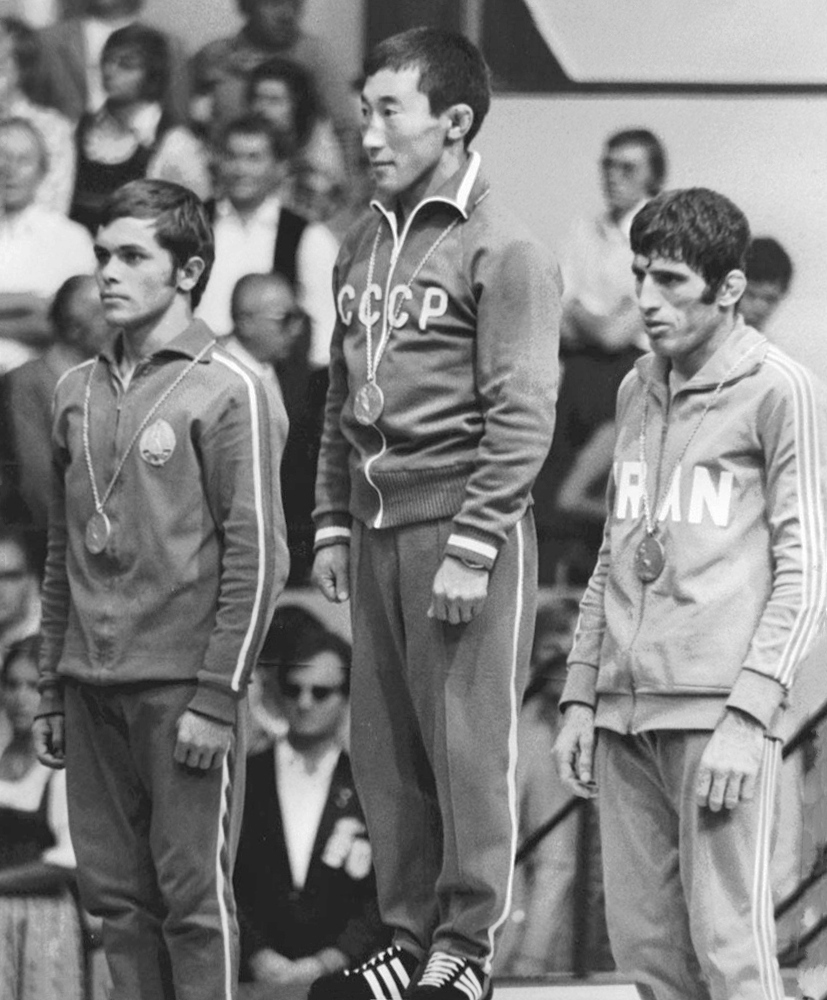
Javadi (right) at the 1972 Summer Olympics
