= Ognyan Nikolov =

Bulgarian wrestler (born 1949)

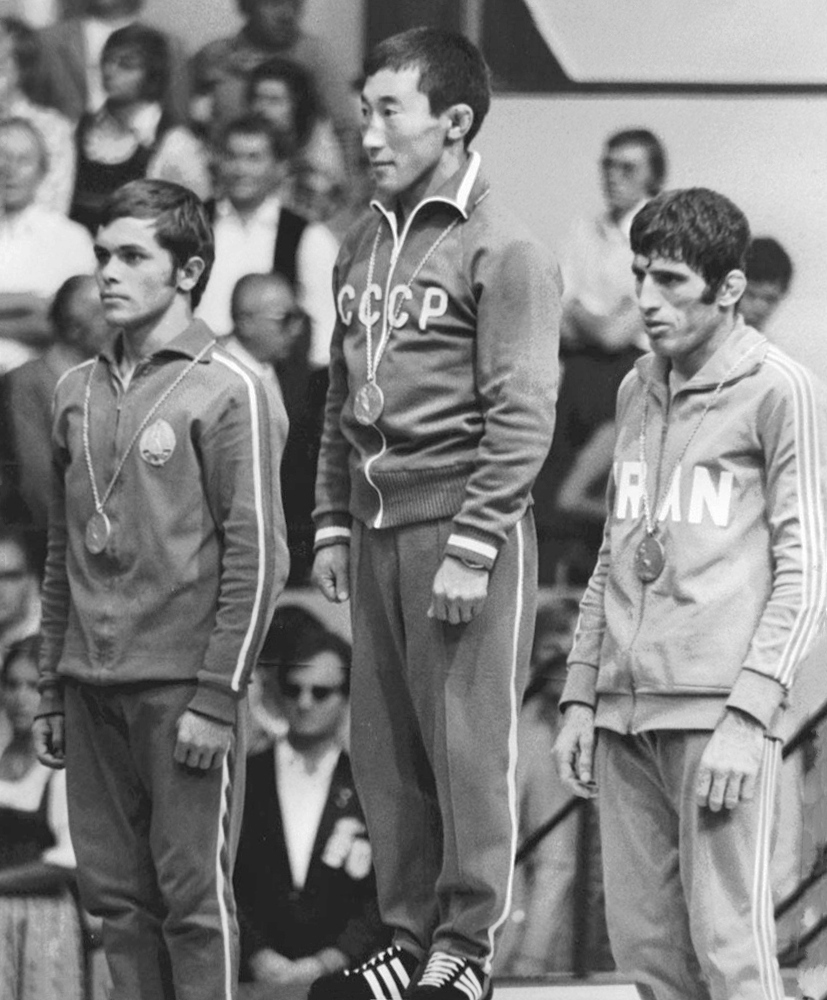
- Nikolov (left) at the 1972 Olympics

Personal information
- Born: 13 June 1949 (age 77) Sofia, Bulgaria
- Height: 157 cm (5 ft 2 in)

Sport
- Sport: Freestyle wrestling
- Club: CSKA Sofia; Levski Sofia
- Coached by: Radoslav Radoslavov
Medal record
Representing Bulgaria
Olympic Games
Silver medal – second place	1972 Munich	-48 kg
World championships
Bronze medal – third place	1971 Sofia	48 kg
European championships
Silver medal – second place	1969 Sofia	48 kg
Bronze medal – third place	1972 Katowice	48 kg
Gold medal – first place	1974 Madrid	52 kg

Ognyan Velikov Nikolov (Bulgarian: Огнян Великов Николов, born 13 June 1949) is a retired Bulgarian freestyle wrestler. He won a silver medal at the 1972 Olympics and a bronze at the 1971 World Championships. At the European championships, he won a gold, a silver and a bronze medal in 1969–1974, placing fourth-fifth in 1975–76.
