= Akihiko Umeda =

Japanese wrestler (born 1947)

Akihiko Umeda (born 23 December 1947) is a Japanese former wrestler who competed in the 1972 Summer Olympics.
