= Mohammad Ghorbani (wrestler) =

Iranian freestyle wrestler

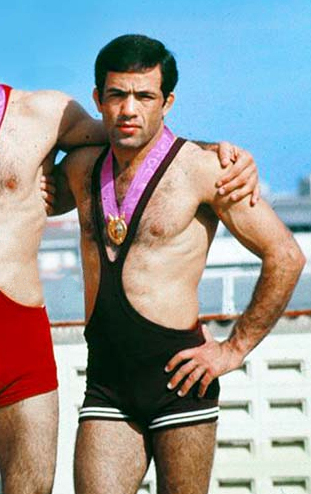
- Ghorbani in 1970

Personal information
- Born: 24 April 1943 (age 83) Qom, Iran
- Height: 162 cm (5 ft 4 in)

Sport
- Sport: Freestyle wrestling
Medal record
Representing Iran
World Championships
Gold medal – first place	1971 Sofia	52 kg
Silver medal – second place	1969 Mar del Plata	52 kg
Bronze medal – third place	1970 Edmonton	52 kg
Asian Games
Gold medal – first place	1970 Bangkok	52 kg

Mohammad Ghorbani (Persian: محمد قربانى, born 24 April 1943) is a retired Iranian flyweight freestyle wrestler who competed in the 1968 Summer Olympics in Mexico City, Mexico and the 1972 Summer Olympics in Munich, Germany. He won the world title (gold) in the 1971 World Wrestling Championships in Sofia, Bulgaria, placed second (silver) in the 1969 World Wrestling Championships in March del Plata, Argentina, and placed third (bronze) in the 1970 World Wrestling Championships in Edmonton, Canada. He also won a gold medal at the 1970 Asian Games in Bangkok, Thailand.
