= Iran at the 1974 Asian Games =

- IOC code: IRN
- NOC: National Olympic Committee of Iran

in Tehran
- Competitors: 314 in 16 sports
- Flag bearer: Moslem Eskandar-Filabi
- Medals Ranked 2nd: Gold 36 Silver 28 Bronze 17 Total 81

Asian Games appearances (overview)
- 1951; 1954; 1958; 1962; 1966; 1970; 1974; 1978; 1982; 1986; 1990; 1994; 1998; 2002; 2006; 2010; 2014; 2018; 2022; 2026

Iran participated in the 1974 Asian Games as a host, and was ranked 2nd with 36 gold medals at this Asiad.

== Competitors ==
| Sport | Men | Women | Total |
|---|---|---|---|
| Athletics | X | X | X |
| Badminton | 6 | 4 | 10 |
| Basketball | 12 | 12 | 24 |
| Boxing | 11 | | 11 |
| Cycling road | X | | X |
| Cycling track | X | | X |
| Diving | X | X | X |
| Fencing | 12 | 5 | 17 |
| Field hockey | 18 | | 18 |
| Football | 20 | | 20 |
| Gymnastics | 6 | 6 | 12 |
| Shooting | X | | X |
| Swimming | X | X | X |
| Table tennis | 5 | 4 | 9 |
| Tennis | 4 | 2 | 6 |
| Volleyball | 12 | 12 | 24 |
| Water polo | 11 | | 11 |
| Weightlifting | 9 | | 9 |
| Wrestling | 19 | | 19 |
| Total | X | X | X |

== Medal summary ==
=== Medals by sport ===
| Sport | Gold | Silver | Bronze | Total |
|---|---|---|---|---|
| Athletics | 3 | 2 | 3 | 8 |
| Boxing | 3 | 2 | 5 | 10 |
| Cycling road | 2 | 1 | 1 | 4 |
| Cycling track | | 1 | 1 | 2 |
| Fencing | 3 | 4 | 3 | 10 |
| Football | 1 | | | 1 |
| Tennis | | 2 | | 2 |
| Water polo | 1 | | | 1 |
| Weightlifting | 10 | 11 | 3 | 24 |
| Wrestling | 13 | 5 | 1 | 19 |
| Total | 36 | 28 | 17 | 81 |

=== Medalists ===
| Medal | Name | Sport | Event |
|---|---|---|---|
| Gold | Teymour Ghiasi | Athletics | Men's high jump |
| Gold | Jalal Keshmiri | Athletics | Men's shot put |
| Gold | Jalal Keshmiri | Athletics | Men's discus throw |
| Gold | Sharif Delaram | Boxing | Men's 71 kg |
| Gold | Masis Hambarsumian | Boxing | Men's 81 kg |
| Gold | Abdolreza Andaveh | Boxing | Men's +81 kg |
| Gold | Hassan Arianfard | Cycling road | Men's road race |
| Gold | Hassan Arianfard; Khosro Haghgosha; Gholam Hossein Kouhi; Esmaeil Zeinali | Cycling road | Men's team time trial |
| Gold | Pirouz Adamiat; Parviz Almasi; Sarkis Assadourian; Ali Asghar Pashapour; Esfandiar Zarnegar | Fencing | Men's team épée |
| Gold | Abdolhamid Fathi; Manouchehr Shafaei; Ahmad Eskandarpour; Ahmad Akbari; Esmaeil Pashapour | Fencing | Men's team sabre |
| Gold | Mahvash Shafaei; Giti Mohebban; Jila Almasi; Maryam Shariatzadeh; Maryam Achak | Fencing | Women's team foil |
| Gold | Nasser Hejazi; Ebrahim Ashtiani; Parviz Ghelichkhani; Akbar Kargarjam; Jafar Kashani; Ali Parvin; Ali Jabbari; Masih Masihnia; Gholam Hossein Mazloumi; Mohammad Sadeghi; Mohammad Reza Adelkhani; Hassan Roshan; Mohsen Houshangi; Karo Haghverdian; Ghafour Jahani; Mohammad Dastjerdi; Ezzat Janmaleki; Mahmoud Etemadi; Bahram Mavaddat; Mansour Rashidi | Football | Men |
| Gold | Firouz Abdolmohammadian; Reza Kamrani; Abdolreza Majdpour; Dariush Movahedi; Hossein Nasim; Ahmad Peidayesh; Morteza Shariat; Heidar Shonjani; Bahram Tavakkoli; Jahangir Tavakkoli; Ahmad Yaghouti | Water polo | Men |
| Gold | Mohammad Nassiri | Weightlifting | Men's 52 kg |
| Gold | Mohammad Nassiri | Weightlifting | Men's 52 kg clean & jerk |
| Gold | Ali Vali | Weightlifting | Men's 90 kg |
| Gold | Ali Vali | Weightlifting | Men's 90 kg clean & jerk |
| Gold | Houshang Kargarnejad | Weightlifting | Men's 110 kg |
| Gold | Houshang Kargarnejad | Weightlifting | Men's 110 kg snatch |
| Gold | Houshang Kargarnejad | Weightlifting | Men's 110 kg clean & jerk |
| Gold | Akbar Shokrollahi | Weightlifting | Men's +110 kg |
| Gold | Akbar Shokrollahi | Weightlifting | Men's +110 kg snatch |
| Gold | Hafez Hassani | Weightlifting | Men's +110 kg clean & jerk |
| Gold | Ebrahim Javadi | Wrestling | Men's freestyle 52 kg |
| Gold | Mohsen Farahvashi | Wrestling | Men's freestyle 57 kg |
| Gold | Mansour Barzegar | Wrestling | Men's freestyle 74 kg |
| Gold | Hamid Alidousti | Wrestling | Men's freestyle 82 kg |
| Gold | Moslem Eskandar-Filabi | Wrestling | Men's freestyle +100 kg |
| Gold | Rahim Aliabadi | Wrestling | Men's Greco-Roman 48 kg |
| Gold | Hossein Touranian | Wrestling | Men's Greco-Roman 57 kg |
| Gold | Akbar Yadollahi | Wrestling | Men's Greco-Roman 62 kg |
| Gold | Mohammad Dalirian | Wrestling | Men's Greco-Roman 68 kg |
| Gold | Hashem Ghanbari | Wrestling | Men's Greco-Roman 74 kg |
| Gold | Jalal Karimi | Wrestling | Men's Greco-Roman 90 kg |
| Gold | Bahram Moshtaghi | Wrestling | Men's Greco-Roman 100 kg |
| Gold | Moslem Eskandar-Filabi | Wrestling | Men's Greco-Roman +100 kg |
| Silver | Reza Entezari | Athletics | Men's 400 m |
| Silver | Reza Entezari | Athletics | Men's 800 m |
| Silver | Abdolreza Ansari | Boxing | Men's 48 kg |
| Silver | Jabbar Feli | Boxing | Men's 57 kg |
| Silver | Gholam Hossein Kouhi | Cycling road | Men's road race |
| Silver | Hossein Baharloo; Manouchehr Daneshmand; Khosro Haghgosha; Ali Pourmehr | Cycling track | Men's team pursuit |
| Silver | Pirouz Adamiat | Fencing | Men's individual épée |
| Silver | Ali Asghar Pashapour | Fencing | Men's individual foil |
| Silver | Abdolhamid Fathi | Fencing | Men's individual sabre |
| Silver | Mahvash Shafaei | Fencing | Women's individual foil |
| Silver | Taghi Akbari | Tennis | Men's singles |
| Silver | Ali Madani; Kambiz Derafshijavan | Tennis | Men's doubles |
| Silver | Mohammad Nassiri | Weightlifting | Men's 52 kg snatch |
| Silver | Nasrollah Dehnavi | Weightlifting | Men's 67.5 kg |
| Silver | Nasrollah Dehnavi | Weightlifting | Men's 67.5 kg snatch |
| Silver | Nasrollah Dehnavi | Weightlifting | Men's 67.5 kg clean & jerk |
| Silver | Mehdi Attar-Ashrafi | Weightlifting | Men's 75 kg clean & jerk |
| Silver | Ebrahim Pourdejam | Weightlifting | Men's 82.5 kg |
| Silver | Ebrahim Pourdejam | Weightlifting | Men's 82.5 kg snatch |
| Silver | Ebrahim Pourdejam | Weightlifting | Men's 82.5 kg clean & jerk |
| Silver | Ali Vali | Weightlifting | Men's 90 kg snatch |
| Silver | Hafez Hassani | Weightlifting | Men's +110 kg |
| Silver | Akbar Shokrollahi | Weightlifting | Men's +110 kg clean & jerk |
| Silver | Sobhan Rouhi | Wrestling | Men's freestyle 48 kg |
| Silver | Mohammad Khorrami | Wrestling | Men's freestyle 68 kg |
| Silver | Reza Khorrami | Wrestling | Men's freestyle 90 kg |
| Silver | Reza Soukhtehsaraei | Wrestling | Men's freestyle 100 kg |
| Silver | Khosro Nezafatdoust | Wrestling | Men's Greco-Roman 82 kg |
| Bronze | Reza Entezari; Fakhroddin Alamshah; Ghasem Koveitipour; Houshang Arshadi | Athletics | Men's 4 × 400 m relay |
| Bronze | Faramarz Asef | Athletics | Men's triple jump |
| Bronze | Salman Hesam | Athletics | Men's discus throw |
| Bronze | Hamlet Minasian | Boxing | Men's 54 kg |
| Bronze | Hossein Madardoust | Boxing | Men's 60 kg |
| Bronze | Farshid Enteghami | Boxing | Men's 63.5 kg |
| Bronze | Ahmad Poureftekhari | Boxing | Men's 67 kg |
| Bronze | Vartex Parsanian | Boxing | Men's 75 kg |
| Bronze | Behrouz Rahbar | Cycling road | Men's road race |
| Bronze | Khosro Haghgosha | Cycling track | Men's individual pursuit |
| Bronze | Ahmad Akbari; Parviz Almasi; Sarkis Assadourian; Ali Asghar Pashapour; Kioumars Tolouei | Fencing | Men's team foil |
| Bronze | Manouchehr Shafaei | Fencing | Men's individual sabre |
| Bronze | Giti Mohebban | Fencing | Women's individual foil |
| Bronze | Mehdi Attar-Ashrafi | Weightlifting | Men's 75 kg |
| Bronze | Mehdi Attar-Ashrafi | Weightlifting | Men's 75 kg snatch |
| Bronze | Hafez Hassani | Weightlifting | Men's +110 kg snatch |
| Bronze | Mohammad Reza Navaei | Wrestling | Men's freestyle 62 kg |

== Results by event ==
=== Aquatics ===
==== Swimming ====
| Athlete | Event | Heats | | Final | |
| Athlete | Event | Time | Rank | Time | Rank |
|---|---|---|---|---|---|
| Ghodrat Shirazi | Men's 100 m freestyle | 59.73 | 13 | Did not advance | |
| Heidar Shonjani | Men's 100 m freestyle | 58.75 | 11 | Did not advance | |
| Javad Goudarzi | Men's 200 m freestyle | 2:20.39 | 14 | Did not advance | |
| Habib Nasseri | Men's 200 m freestyle | 2:17.21 | 13 | Did not advance | |
| Fereydoun Jalili | Men's 400 m freestyle | 4:50.05 | 9 QR | 4:48.59 | 8 |
| Habib Nasseri | Men's 400 m freestyle | 4:50.05 | 10 | Did not advance | |
| Fereydoun Jalili | Men's 1500 m freestyle | 19:05.68 | 8 Q | 19:08.63 | 8 |
| Tahmoures Rastin | Men's 1500 m freestyle | 20:01.75 | 10 | Did not advance | |
| Fariborz Keshvardoust | Men's 100 m backstroke | 1:11.61 | 9 | Did not advance | |
| Mohammad Masrouri | Men's 200 m backstroke | 2:48.60 | 11 | Did not advance | |
| Hossein Nasim | Men's 200 m backstroke | 2:32.81 | 9 | Did not advance | |
| Afshin Hazrati | Men's 100 m breaststroke | 1:11.43 | 5 Q | 1:11.02 | 5 |
| Behzad Rahimian | Men's 100 m breaststroke | 1:13.07 | 9 | Did not advance | |
| Afshin Hazrati | Men's 200 m breaststroke | 2:37.38 | 5 Q | 2:36.60 | 6 |
| Behzad Rahimian | Men's 200 m breaststroke | 2:48.95 | 9 | Did not advance | |
| Shahram Azarfar | Men's 100 m butterfly | 1:04.43 | 11 | Did not advance | |
| Heshmat Ojagh | Men's 100 m butterfly | 1:05.70 | 12 | Did not advance | |
| Shahram Azarfar | Men's 200 m butterfly | 2:23.07 | 10 QR | 2:23.62 | 8 |
| Javad Mottaghi | Men's 200 m butterfly | 2:28.54 | 12 | Did not advance | |
| Salem Hardani | Men's 200 m individual medley | 2:36.16 | 12 | Did not advance | |
| Iraj Raoufazar | Men's 200 m individual medley | 2:33.63 | 10 | Did not advance | |
| Shahriar Azarfar | Men's 400 m individual medley | 5:21.83 | 7 Q | 5:26.05 | 7 |
| Iraj Raoufazar | Men's 400 m individual medley | 5:29.55 | 9 | Did not advance | |
| | Men's 4 × 100 m freestyle relay | —N/a | | | ? |
| | Men's 4 × 200 m freestyle relay | —N/a | | 9:03.42 | 5 |
| | Men's 4 × 100 m medley relay | —N/a | | 4:21.02 | 4 |
| Zinat Moayyed | Women's 100 m freestyle | 1:09.91 | 10 | Did not advance | |
| Lesli Firouzabadian | Women's 200 m freestyle | 2:47.87 | 12 | Did not advance | |
| Zinat Moayyed | Women's 200 m freestyle | 2:38.45 | 11 | Did not advance | |
| Lesli Firouzabadian | Women's 400 m freestyle | DNS | — | Did not advance | |
| Nastaran Hassanizadeh | Women's 400 m freestyle | 5:43.84 | 11 | Did not advance | |
| Shirin Firouzabadian | Women's 100 m backstroke | 1:21.37 | 8 Q | 1:21.72 | 8 |
| Nastaran Hassanizadeh | Women's 100 m backstroke | 1:22.17 | 9 | Did not advance | |
| Haleh Vafaei | Women's 100 m breaststroke | 1:37.58 | 14 | Did not advance | |
| Tonia Valioghli | Women's 100 m breaststroke | 1:30.65 | 13 | Did not advance | |
| Haleh Vafaei | Women's 200 m breaststroke | 3:22.06 | 14 | Did not advance | |
| Tonia Valioghli | Women's 200 m breaststroke | 3:14.44 | 12 | Did not advance | |
| Linda Firouzabadian | Women's 100 m butterfly | 1:37.14 | 9 | Did not advance | |
| Shirin Firouzabadian | Women's 200 m individual medley | 2:57.74 | 11 | Did not advance | |
| | Women's 4 × 100 m freestyle relay | —N/a | | 4:52.02 | 5 |
| | Women's 4 × 100 m medley relay | —N/a | | | ? |

==== Water polo ====
Men

| Squad list | Round 1 / 4 | Round 2 / 5 | Round 3 / 6 | Rank |
|---|---|---|---|---|
| Firouz Abdolmohammadian; Jahangir Tavakkoli; Heidar Shonjani; Ahmad Peidayesh; Dariush Movahedi; Bahram Tavakkoli; Reza Kamrani; Morteza Shariat; Hossein Nasim; Abdolreza Majdpour; Ahmad Yaghouti; Coach: (Romania) Angelescu | India; W 18–6 | Japan; D 6–6 | North Korea; W 9–5 | 1st place, gold medalist(s) |
| Firouz Abdolmohammadian; Jahangir Tavakkoli; Heidar Shonjani; Ahmad Peidayesh; Dariush Movahedi; Bahram Tavakkoli; Reza Kamrani; Morteza Shariat; Hossein Nasim; Abdolreza Majdpour; Ahmad Yaghouti; Coach: (Romania) Angelescu | China; D 5–5 | Kuwait; W 32–1 | Singapore; W 9–1 | 1st place, gold medalist(s) |

=== Badminton ===
Individual

| Athlete | Event | Round of 32 | Round of 16 | Quarterfinal | Semifinal | Final | Rank |
|---|---|---|---|---|---|---|---|
| Sirous Aflatoun | Men's singles | Bye | Hou (CHN); L 0–2 (4–15, 3–15) | Did not advance | | | 9 |
| Dariush Foroughi | Men's singles | Yang (HKG); L 0–2 (2–15, 7–15) | Did not advance | | | | 17 |
| Sirous Aflatoun; Dariush Foroughi | Men's doubles | Bye | Khanna and Ghosh (IND); W WO | Tjun and Wahjudi (INA); L 0–2 (0–15, 2–15) | Did not advance | | 5 |
| Mohsen Sheida; Sadra Shoushtari | Men's doubles | Hauw and Wong (HKG); W WO | Tang and Chen (CHN); L 0–2 (5–15, 6–15) | Did not advance | | | 9 |
| Mina Pourghobadi | Women's singles | —N/a | Oh (KOR); L 0–2 (0–11, 0–11) | Did not advance | | | 9 |
| Rafat Yazdanparast | Women's singles | —N/a | Bak (PRK); L 0–2 (0–11, 0–11) | Did not advance | | | 9 |
| Houri Farshian; Mina Pourghobadi | Women's doubles | —N/a | Liang and Zheng (CHN); L 0–2 (1–15, 2–15) | Did not advance | | | 9 |
| Behnaz Nourazar; Rafat Yazdanparast | Women's doubles | —N/a | Ng and Ang (MAS); L 0–2 (1–15, 1–15) | Did not advance | | | 9 |
| Mohsen Sheida; Mina Pourghobadi | Mixed doubles | —N/a | Sakuntaniyom and Kingmanee (THA); L 0–2 (1–15, 1–15) | Did not advance | | | 9 |
| Sadra Shoushtari; Houri Farshian | Mixed doubles | —N/a | Soong and Ng (MAS); L 0–2 (1–15, 2–15) | Did not advance | | | 9 |

Team

| Athlete | Event | Round of 16 | Quarterfinal | Semifinal | Final | Rank |
|---|---|---|---|---|---|---|
| Sirous Aflatoun; Dariush Foroughi; Mohsen Sheida; Sadra Shoushtari; Kioumars Sotoudeh; Mohsen Zamani | Men's team | Bye | Indonesia; L 0–5 (0–2, 0–2, 0–2, 0–2, 0–2) | 5th–8th places Hong Kong; L 0–3 (0–2, 0–2, 0–2) | 7th place match Philippines; L 0–3 (0–2, 0–2, 0–2) | 8 |
| Houri Farshian; Behnaz Nourazar; Mina Pourghobadi; Rafat Yazdanparast | Women's team | —N/a | Indonesia; L 0–5 (0–2, 0–2, 0–2, 0–2, 0–2) | Did not advance | | 5 |

=== Basketball ===
Men

| Squad list | Preliminary round | | Second round | | Semifinal | Final | Rank |
| Squad list | Group D | Rank | Group A | Rank | Semifinal | Final | Rank |
|---|---|---|---|---|---|---|---|
| Nader Kashani; Reza Esmaeili; Jafar Gharehkhani; Nosratollah Iliavi; Rasoul Javadi; Abbas Heidari; Reza Mashhoun; Mohsen Khalkhali; Mozaffar Banihashemi; Amir Saboktakin; Salim Shibeh; Nasser Biglari; Coach: (Romania) George Chiraleu | Bahrain; W 128–62 | 1 Q | Philippines; L 91–93 | 4 | 5th–8th places Japan; W 89–86 | 5th place match North Korea; L 74–75 | 6 |
| Nader Kashani; Reza Esmaeili; Jafar Gharehkhani; Nosratollah Iliavi; Rasoul Javadi; Abbas Heidari; Reza Mashhoun; Mohsen Khalkhali; Mozaffar Banihashemi; Amir Saboktakin; Salim Shibeh; Nasser Biglari; Coach: (Romania) George Chiraleu | Pakistan; W 97–86 | 1 Q | North Korea; L 65–86 | 4 | 5th–8th places Japan; W 89–86 | 5th place match North Korea; L 74–75 | 6 |
| Nader Kashani; Reza Esmaeili; Jafar Gharehkhani; Nosratollah Iliavi; Rasoul Javadi; Abbas Heidari; Reza Mashhoun; Mohsen Khalkhali; Mozaffar Banihashemi; Amir Saboktakin; Salim Shibeh; Nasser Biglari; Coach: (Romania) George Chiraleu | | | China; L 78–94 | 4 | 5th–8th places Japan; W 89–86 | 5th place match North Korea; L 74–75 | 6 |

Women

| Squad list | Round 1 | Round 2 | Round 3 | Round 4 | Rank |
|---|---|---|---|---|---|
| Farzaneh Nourbakhsh; Zohreh Shahmaei; Mahin Kourehchian; Maro Avanesian; Aylin Malekian; Janik Shahbazian; Zahra Taghipour; Avlin Avakian; Fattaneh Hadavi; Soheila Rouhani; Hilda Malekian; Ziba Aflatoun | Japan; L 24–89 | North Korea; L 36–95 | China; L 60–89 | South Korea; L 43–74 | 5 |

=== Boxing ===
Men

| Athlete | Event | Preliminary | Quarterfinal | Semifinal | Final | Rank |
|---|---|---|---|---|---|---|
| Abdolreza Ansari | 48 kg | Bye | de Kauwe (SRI); W Points | Kim (PRK); W Points | Park (KOR); L Points | 2nd place, silver medalist(s) |
| Armid Bogosian | 51 kg | Netmanee (THA); L RSC | Did not advance | | | 9 |
| Hamlet Minasian | 54 kg | Bye | Din (PAK); W Disqualification | Ishigaki (JPN); L Points | Did not advance | 3rd place, bronze medalist(s) |
| Jabbar Feli | 57 kg | Bye | Kim (PRK); W Points | Seubsanon (THA); W Walkover | Yu (KOR); L Knockout | 2nd place, silver medalist(s) |
| Hossein Madardoust | 60 kg | | Pankaew (THA); W Points | Gombo (MGL); L Points | Did not advance | 3rd place, bronze medalist(s) |
| Farshid Enteghami | 63.5 kg | Balouch (PAK); W Points | Sebti (IRQ); W Points | Park (KOR); L Points | Did not advance | 3rd place, bronze medalist(s) |
| Ahmad Poureftekhari | 67 kg | Bye | Chindarasi (THA); W Points | Seki (JPN); L Points | Did not advance | 3rd place, bronze medalist(s) |
| Sharif Delaram | 71 kg | Bye | Singh (IND); W Points | Aquilino (PHI); W Points | Jang (PRK); W Points | 1st place, gold medalist(s) |
| Vartex Parsanian | 75 kg | | Bye | Kim (KOR); L Points | Did not advance | 3rd place, bronze medalist(s) |
| Masis Hambarsumian | 81 kg | | | Hussain (PAK); W Points | Singh (IND); W Points | 1st place, gold medalist(s) |
| Abdolreza Andaveh | +81 kg | | | Shah (PAK); W Points | Bura (IND); W Disqualification | 1st place, gold medalist(s) |

=== Cycling ===
==== Road ====
Men

| Athlete | Event | Time | Rank |
|---|---|---|---|
| Hassan Arianfard | Road race | 5:16:12 | 1st place, gold medalist(s) |
| Gholam Hossein Kouhi | Road race | 5:16:13 | 2nd place, silver medalist(s) |
| Behrouz Rahbar | Road race | 5:16:13 | 3rd place, bronze medalist(s) |
| Hassan Arianfard; Khosro Haghgosha; Gholam Hossein Kouhi; Esmaeil Zeinali | Team time trial | 2:17:04.47 | 1st place, gold medalist(s) |

=== Football ===
| Team | Event | Preliminary round | | | | Second round | | | | Final | Rank |
| Team | Event | Round 1 | Round 2 | Round 3 | Rank | Round 1 | Round 2 | Round 3 | Rank | Final | Rank |
|---|---|---|---|---|---|---|---|---|---|---|---|
| Iran | Men | Pakistan; W 7–0 | Burma; W 2–1 | Bahrain; W 6–0 | 1 Q | Malaysia; W 1–0 | South Korea; W 2–0 | Iraq; W 1–0 | 1 Q | Israel; W 1–0 | 1st place, gold medalist(s) |
Roster: Nasser Hejazi; Ebrahim Ashtiani; Parviz Ghelichkhani; Akbar Kargarjam; Jafar Kashani; Ali Parvin; Ali Jabbari; Masih Masihnia; Gholam Hossein Mazloumi; Mohammad Sadeghi; Mohammad Reza Adelkhani; Hassan Roshan; Mohsen Houshangi; Karo Haghverdian; Ghafour Jahani; Mohammad Dastjerdi; Ezzat Janmaleki; Mahmoud Etemadi; Bahram Mavaddat; Mansour Rashidi; Coach: (Republic of Ireland) Frank O'Farrell

=== Volleyball ===
| Team | Event | Preliminary round / Round robin | | | | | Semifinal | Final | Rank |
| Team | Event | Round 1 | Round 2 | Round 3 | Round 4 | Rank | Semifinal | Final | Rank |
|---|---|---|---|---|---|---|---|---|---|
| Iran | Men | Pakistan; W 3–0 (15–1, 15–8, 15–11) | South Korea; L 0–3 (13–15, 3–15, 10–15) | Kuwait; W 3–0 (15–6, 15–5, 15–9) | —N/a | 2 Q | Japan; L 0–3 (3–15, 3–15, 10–15) | China; L 1–3 (3–15, 4–15, 15–11, 12–15) | 4 |
| Iran | Women | China; L 0–3 (4–15, 8–15, 1–15) | South Korea; L 0–3 (0–15, 3–15, 4–15) | Japan; L 0–3 (1–15, 3–15, 0–15) | North Korea; L 0–3 (3–15, 3–15, 0–15) | 5 | —N/a | | |
Roster – Men: Houshang Malekloo; Mehdi Saberpour; Yadollah Kargarpisheh; Aziz Partovi; Hossein Tavassoli; Mashallah Farrokhmanesh; Mohammad Ali Heidarkhan; Fariborz Estakhri; Mostafa Zoghinejad; Amir Heidari; Mahmoud Chaichi; Mahmoud Moheb; Coach: (Japan) Tadahiko Kuroda Roster – Women: Minoo Eshtiagh; Pari Fardi; Fahimeh Farmanara; Mina Fathi; Batoul Hosseinpour; Mahvash Kamalifard; Mahvash Nourbakhsh; Habibeh Pashaei; Mahin Pourmeraj; Sorour Saadati; Fatemeh Sepanji; Giti Yeganeh; Coach: (Japan) Tadahiko Kuroda

=== Weightlifting ===
| Athlete | Event | Snatch | | Clean & Jerk | | Total | |
| Athlete | Event | Result | Rank | Result | Rank | Result | Rank |
|---|---|---|---|---|---|---|---|
| Mohammad Nassiri | Men's 52 kg | 100.0 | 2nd place, silver medalist(s) | 132.5 | 1st place, gold medalist(s) | 232.5 | 1st place, gold medalist(s) |
| Nasrollah Dehnavi | Men's 67.5 kg | 127.5 | 2nd place, silver medalist(s) | 162.5 | 2nd place, silver medalist(s) | 290.0 | 2nd place, silver medalist(s) |
| Mehdi Attar-Ashrafi | Men's 75 kg | 120.0 | 3rd place, bronze medalist(s) | 160.0 | 2nd place, silver medalist(s) | 280.0 | 3rd place, bronze medalist(s) |
| Ebrahim Pourdejam | Men's 82.5 kg | 135.0 | 2nd place, silver medalist(s) | 170.0 | 2nd place, silver medalist(s) | 305.0 | 2nd place, silver medalist(s) |
| Ali Vali | Men's 90 kg | 127.5 | 2nd place, silver medalist(s) | 185.0 | 1st place, gold medalist(s) | 312.5 | 1st place, gold medalist(s) |
| Shahkaram Karamzadeh | Men's 110 kg | 132.5 | 4 | 165.0 | 5 | 297.5 | 5 |
| Houshang Kargarnejad | Men's 110 kg | 140.0 | 1st place, gold medalist(s) | 185.0 | 1st place, gold medalist(s) | 325.0 | 1st place, gold medalist(s) |
| Hafez Hassani | Men's +110 kg | 130.0 | 3rd place, bronze medalist(s) | 177.5 | 1st place, gold medalist(s) | 307.5 | 2nd place, silver medalist(s) |
| Akbar Shokrollahi | Men's +110 kg | 140.0 | 1st place, gold medalist(s) | 177.5 | 2nd place, silver medalist(s) | 317.5 | 1st place, gold medalist(s) |

=== Wrestling ===
Men's freestyle

| Athlete | Event | Round 1 | Round 2 | Round 3 | Round 4 | Final round | Rank |
|---|---|---|---|---|---|---|---|
| Sobhan Rouhi | 48 kg | Kudo (JPN); L Fall | Rafique (PAK); W Fall | Bye | Enkhtaivan (MGL); W | Pak (PRK); W Fall | 2nd place, silver medalist(s) |
| Ebrahim Javadi | 52 kg | Tangente (PHI); W Fall | Ri (PRK); W | Ganbat (MGL); W | Singh (IND); W | Takada (JPN); D 2–2 | 1st place, gold medalist(s) |
| Mohsen Farahvashi | 57 kg | Mahdi (IRQ); W Disqualification | Ditta (PAK); W Fall | Bye | Sasaki (JPN); W 14–3 | Ha (PRK); W 10–1 | 1st place, gold medalist(s) |
| Mohammad Reza Navaei | 62 kg | Djan (AFG); W Fall | Saito (JPN); W Fall | Majeed (PAK); D | Singh (IND); W Fall | Oidov (MGL); L Fall | 3rd place, bronze medalist(s) |
| Mohammad Reza Navaei | 62 kg | Djan (AFG); W Fall | Saito (JPN); W Fall | Majeed (PAK); D | Singh (IND); W Fall | Yang (KOR); L | 3rd place, bronze medalist(s) |
| Mohammad Khorrami | 68 kg | Chang (KOR); W 18–6 | Kyong (PRK); W | Djan (AFG); W Fall | Singh (IND); W | Sugawara (JPN); L 1–9 | 2nd place, silver medalist(s) |
| Mansour Barzegar | 74 kg | Mahdi (IRQ); W Fall | Kim (KOR); W Fall | Bye | Sereeter (MGL); W | Degawa (JPN); W 5–1 | 1st place, gold medalist(s) |
| Hamid Alidousti | 82 kg | Tserendash (MGL); W 9–1 | Kang (KOR); W | Motegi (JPN); W 7–4 | Singh (IND); W | Bye | 1st place, gold medalist(s) |
| Reza Khorrami | 90 kg | Singh (IND); W 6–4 | Hussein (IRQ); W Fall | Tserentogtokh (MGL); D | Kamada (JPN); D 4–4 | | 2nd place, silver medalist(s) |
| Reza Soukhtehsaraei | 100 kg | Cheema (IND); W 9–1 | Bye | Saito (JPN); W Fall | Bayanmönkh (MGL); D 4–4 | | 2nd place, silver medalist(s) |
| Moslem Eskandar-Filabi | +100 kg | Singh (IND); W Fall | Bye | Isogai (JPN); D | Khan (PAK); W Walkover | | 1st place, gold medalist(s) |

Men's Greco-Roman

| Athlete | Event | Round 1 | Round 2 | Round 3 | Round 4 | Final round | Rank |
|---|---|---|---|---|---|---|---|
| Rahim Aliabadi | 48 kg | Ishida (JPN); W Fall | Mansour (IRQ); W Fall | Bye | Chander (IND); W Fall | Bang (KOR); W 17–3 | 1st place, gold medalist(s) |
| Hossein Naghibzadeh | 52 kg | Enkhtaivan (MGL); W 18–6 | Hirayama (JPN); L 1–5 | Baek (KOR); L 3–18 | did not advance | | 4 |
| Hossein Touranian | 57 kg | Kumar (IND); W Fall | Jasim (IRQ); W Fall | Sakurama (JPN); W Fall | An (KOR); W 13–4 | | 1st place, gold medalist(s) |
| Akbar Yadollahi | 62 kg | Miyahara (JPN); W 7–4 | Majeed (PAK); W | Choi (KOR); W Fall | Bye | | 1st place, gold medalist(s) |
| Mohammad Dalirian | 68 kg | Yadav (IND); W Fall | Kobayashi (JPN); W | Bae (KOR); W 10–9 | Djan (AFG); W Fall | Natsagdorj (MGL); W Disqualification | 1st place, gold medalist(s) |
| Hashem Ghanbari | 74 kg | Singh (IND); W Fall | Yaghoub (PAK); W Fall | Bye | Kang (KOR); D 9–9 | Nagatomo (JPN); W 8–4 | 1st place, gold medalist(s) |
| Khosro Nezafatdoust | 82 kg | Sato (JPN); L Disqualification | Singh (IND); W Fall | Tserendash (MGL); W Fall | Bye | | 2nd place, silver medalist(s) |
| Jalal Karimi | 90 kg | Bye | Fujita (JPN); D 2–2 | Singh (IND); W Fall | Mönkhbat (MGL); W Fall | | 1st place, gold medalist(s) |
| Bahram Moshtaghi | 100 kg | Saito (JPN); W 14–7 | Abdul-Ghani (IRQ); W Fall | Cheema (IND); W Fall | Bayanmönkh (MGL); W 5–3 | | 1st place, gold medalist(s) |
| Moslem Eskandar-Filabi | +100 kg | Shihab (IRQ); W Disqualification | Singh (IND); W Fall | Adiyaatömör (MGL); W | Isogai (JPN); L DSQ2 | | 1st place, gold medalist(s) |
