= List of Asian Games medalists in wrestling =

Asian Games list of medalists

This is the complete list of Asian Games medalists in wrestling from 1954 to 2026.

== Men's freestyle ==
=== Light flyweight ===
- 48 kg: 1970–1994

Games	Gold	Silver	Bronze
1970 Bangkok	Ebrahim Javadi (IRN)	Yoshiyuki Matsuhashi (JPN)	Kim Hwa-kyung (KOR)
1974 Tehran	Akira Kudo (JPN)	Sobhan Rouhi (IRN)	Ochirdolgoryn Enkhtaivan (MGL)
1978 Bangkok	Takashi Irie (JPN)	Jang Se-hong (PRK)	Kim Hwa-kyung (KOR)
1982 New Delhi	Takashi Kobayashi (JPN)	Kim Chol-han (PRK)	Son Gab-do (KOR)
1986 Seoul	Majid Torkan (IRN)	Gao Wenhe (CHN)	Takashi Irie (JPN)
1990 Beijing	Kim Jong-shin (KOR)	Ombir Singh (IND)	Tserenbaataryn Khosbayar (MGL)
1994 Hiroshima	Nader Rahmati (IRI)	Tümendembereliin Züünbayan (MGL)	Moon Myung-seok (KOR)

=== Flyweight ===
- 52 kg: 1954–1994
- 54 kg: 1998

Games	Gold	Silver	Bronze
1954 Manila	Din Mohammad (PAK)	Yushu Kitano (JPN)	Basilio Fabila (PHI)
1958 Tokyo	Ryoji Yoshida (JPN)	Khalil Rayatpanah (IRN)	Shujah-ud-Din (PAK)
1962 Jakarta	Noriyuki Harada (JPN)	Chang Chang-sun (KOR)	Malwa Singh (IND)
1966 Bangkok	Shigeo Nakata (JPN)	Ali Akbar Heidari (IRN)	Shamrao Sable (IND)
1970 Bangkok	Mohammad Ghorbani (IRN)	Kiyomi Kato (JPN)	Kim Young-jun (KOR)
1974 Tehran	Ebrahim Javadi (IRN)	Yuji Takada (JPN)	Satbir Singh (IND)
1978 Bangkok	Yuji Takada (JPN)	Kim Jong-kyu (KOR)	Dorjzovdyn Ganbat (MGL)
1982 New Delhi	Toshio Asakura (JPN)	Mohammad Hossein Dabbaghi (IRN)	Kim Jong-kyu (KOR)
1986 Seoul	Mitsuru Sato (JPN)	Yaghoub Najafi (IRN)	Son Gab-do (KOR)
1990 Beijing	Oveis Mallah (IRN)	Hideo Sasayama (JPN)	Sol Su-chol (PRK)
1994 Hiroshima	Maulen Mamyrov (KAZ)	Dun Dege (CHN)	Nurdin Donbaev (KGZ)
1998 Bangkok	Jin Ju-dong (PRK)	Behnam Tayyebi (IRI)	Maulen Mamyrov (KAZ)

=== Bantamweight ===
- 57 kg: 1954–1994
- 58 kg: 1998
- 55 kg: 2002–2010
- 57 kg: 2014–

Games	Gold	Silver	Bronze
1954 Manila	Minoru Iizuka (JPN)	Han Duk-hung (KOR)	Muhammad Amin (PAK)
1958 Tokyo	Minoru Iizuka (JPN)	Muhammad Akhtar (PAK)	Gholam Hossein Zandi (IRN)
1962 Jakarta	Tadashi Asai (JPN)	Siraj Din (PAK)	Choi Young-kil (KOR)
1966 Bangkok	Tadamichi Tanaka (JPN)	Mohammad Ali Farrokhian (IRN)	Bishambar Singh (IND)
1970 Bangkok	Hideaki Yanagida (JPN)	An Jae-won (KOR)	Sardar Muhammad (PAK)
1974 Tehran	Mohsen Farahvashi (IRN)	Tadashi Sasaki (JPN)	Ha Hi-woo (PRK)
1978 Bangkok	Hideaki Tomiyama (JPN)	Muhammad Azeem (PAK)	Kim Eui-kon (KOR)
1982 New Delhi	Hideaki Tomiyama (JPN)	Askari Mohammadian (IRN)	Ashok Kumar (IND)
1986 Seoul	Askari Mohammadian (IRN)	Kong Yong-il (KOR)	Toshio Asakura (JPN)
1990 Beijing	Kim Yong-sik (PRK)	Arslangiin Tsedensodnom (MGL)	Jalil Jahanshahi (IRN)
1994 Hiroshima	Tserenbaataryn Tsogtbayar (MGL)	Maksat Boburbekov (KGZ)	Oveis Mallah (IRI)
1998 Bangkok	Ri Yong-sam (PRK)	Oyuunbilegiin Pürevbaatar (MGL)	Mohammad Talaei (IRI)
2002 Busan	Dilshod Mansurov (UZB)	Chikara Tanabe (JPN)	Mohammad Rezaei (IRI)
2006 Doha	Dilshod Mansurov (UZB)	Jon Hyon-guk (PRK)	Hidenori Taoka (JPN)
2006 Doha	Dilshod Mansurov (UZB)	Jon Hyon-guk (PRK)	Kim Hyo-sub (KOR)
2010 Guangzhou	Dilshod Mansurov (UZB)	Yang Kyong-il (PRK)	Yasuhiro Inaba (JPN)
2010 Guangzhou	Dilshod Mansurov (UZB)	Yang Kyong-il (PRK)	Kim Hyo-sub (KOR)
2014 Incheon	Jong Hak-jin (PRK)	Rassul Kaliyev (KAZ)	Yun Jun-sik (KOR)
2014 Incheon	Jong Hak-jin (PRK)	Rassul Kaliyev (KAZ)	Batboldyn Nomin (MGL)
2018 Jakarta–Palembang	Erdenebatyn Bekhbayar (MGL)	Kang Kum-song (PRK)	Reza Atri (IRI)
2018 Jakarta–Palembang	Erdenebatyn Bekhbayar (MGL)	Kang Kum-song (PRK)	Yuki Takahashi (JPN)
2022 Hangzhou	Toshihiro Hasegawa (JPN)	Han Chong-song (PRK)	Aman Sehrawat (IND)
2022 Hangzhou	Toshihiro Hasegawa (JPN)	Han Chong-song (PRK)	Narmandakhyn Nasanbuyan (MGL)
2026 Aichi–Nagoya	Aman Sehrawat (IND)	Han Chong-song (PRK)	Zou Wanhao (CHN)
2026 Aichi–Nagoya	Aman Sehrawat (IND)	Han Chong-song (PRK)	Aiaal Belolyubskii (TJK)

=== Featherweight ===
- 62 kg: 1954–1958
- 63 kg: 1962–1966
- 62 kg: 1970–1994
- 63 kg: 1998
- 60 kg: 2002–2010
- 61 kg: 2014

Games	Gold	Silver	Bronze
1954 Manila	Shigeru Kasahara (JPN)	Mansueto Napilay (PHI)	Kim Yung-jun (KOR)
1958 Tokyo	Kiyoshi Nakagawa (JPN)	Siraj Din (PAK)	Nasser Givehchi (IRN)
1962 Jakarta	Osamu Watanabe (JPN)	Muhammad Akhtar (PAK)	Mohammad Ebrahim Khedri (AFG)
1966 Bangkok	Masaaki Kaneko (JPN)	Ebrahim Seifpour (IRN)	Chang Kyung-mu (KOR)
1970 Bangkok	Shamseddin Seyed-Abbasi (IRN)	Kiyoshi Abe (JPN)	Kim Moon-ki (KOR)
1974 Tehran	Yang Jung-mo (KOR)	Zevegiin Oidov (MGL)	Mohammad Reza Navaei (IRN)
1978 Bangkok	Yang Jung-mo (KOR)	Norio Yamazaki (JPN)	Abdul Waheed (PAK)
1982 New Delhi	Hiroshi Kaneko (JPN)	Lee Jung-keun (KOR)	Ahmad Rezaei (IRN)
1986 Seoul	Lee Jung-keun (KOR)	Kazuhito Sakae (JPN)	Akbar Fallah (IRN)
1990 Beijing	Takumi Adachi (JPN)	Kim Il-chol (PRK)	Shin Sang-kyu (KOR)
1994 Hiroshima	Takahiro Wada (JPN)	Jang Jae-sung (KOR)	Reza Safaei (IRI)
1998 Bangkok	Jang Jae-sung (KOR)	Ramil Islamov (UZB)	Tserenbaataryn Tsogtbayar (MGL)
2002 Busan	Oyuunbilegiin Pürevbaatar (MGL)	Song Jae-myung (KOR)	Ulan Nadyrbek Uulu (KGZ)
2006 Doha	Morad Mohammadi (IRI)	Song Jae-myung (KOR)	Yogeshwar Dutt (IND)
2006 Doha	Morad Mohammadi (IRI)	Song Jae-myung (KOR)	Ri Yong-chol (PRK)
2010 Guangzhou	Ganzorigiin Mandakhnaran (MGL)	Hiroyuki Oda (JPN)	Gao Feng (CHN)
2010 Guangzhou	Ganzorigiin Mandakhnaran (MGL)	Hiroyuki Oda (JPN)	Dauren Zhumagaziyev (KAZ)
2014 Incheon	Masoud Esmaeilpour (IRI)	Bajrang Punia (IND)	Noriyuki Takatsuka (JPN)
2014 Incheon	Masoud Esmaeilpour (IRI)	Bajrang Punia (IND)	Lee Seung-chul (KOR)

=== Lightweight ===
- 67 kg: 1954–1958
- 70 kg: 1962–1966
- 68 kg: 1970–1994
- 69 kg: 1998
- 66 kg: 2002–2010
- 65 kg: 2014–

Games	Gold	Silver	Bronze
1954 Manila	Takeo Shimotori (JPN)	B. G. Kashid (IND)	Muhammad Ashraf (PAK)
1958 Tokyo	Emam-Ali Habibi (IRN)	Kazuo Abe (JPN)	Bong Chang-won (KOR)
1962 Jakarta	Kazuo Abe (JPN)	Udey Chand (IND)	Ghulam Rasool (PAK)
1966 Bangkok	Abdollah Movahed (IRN)	Yoshiharu Tobita (JPN)	Udey Chand (IND)
1970 Bangkok	Abdollah Movahed (IRN)	Shared gold	Om Prakash (IND)
1970 Bangkok	Kikuo Wada (JPN)	Shared gold	Om Prakash (IND)
1974 Tehran	Yasaburo Sugawara (JPN)	Mohammad Khorrami (IRN)	Chang Ho-seong (KOR)
1978 Bangkok	Zevegiin Oidov (MGL)	Akira Miyahara (JPN)	Go Jin-won (KOR)
1982 New Delhi	Buyandelgeriin Bold (MGL)	Masakazu Kamimura (JPN)	You In-tak (KOR)
1986 Seoul	Kim Soo-hwan (KOR)	Kosei Akaishi (JPN)	Ali Akbarnejad (IRN)
1990 Beijing	Park Jang-soon (KOR)	Rasoul Khadem (IRN)	Yang Zhigang (CHN)
1994 Hiroshima	Ali Akbarnejad (IRI)	Ryusaburo Katsu (JPN)	Hwang Sang-ho (KOR)
1998 Bangkok	Amir Tavakkolian (IRI)	Ahmad Al-Osta (SYR)	Ryusaburo Katsu (JPN)
2002 Busan	Baek Jin-kuk (KOR)	Alireza Dabir (IRI)	Norjingiin Bayarmagnai (MGL)
2006 Doha	Baek Jin-kuk (KOR)	Takafumi Kojima (JPN)	Sushil Kumar (IND)
2006 Doha	Baek Jin-kuk (KOR)	Takafumi Kojima (JPN)	Buyanjavyn Batzorig (MGL)
2010 Guangzhou	Tatsuhiro Yonemitsu (JPN)	Mehdi Taghavi (IRI)	Leonid Spiridonov (KAZ)
2010 Guangzhou	Tatsuhiro Yonemitsu (JPN)	Mehdi Taghavi (IRI)	Yang Chun-song (PRK)
2014 Incheon	Yogeshwar Dutt (IND)	Zalimkhan Yusupov (TJK)	Yeerlanbieke Katai (CHN)
2014 Incheon	Yogeshwar Dutt (IND)	Zalimkhan Yusupov (TJK)	Ikhtiyor Navruzov (UZB)
2018 Jakarta–Palembang	Bajrang Punia (IND)	Daichi Takatani (JPN)	Sayatbek Okassov (KAZ)
2018 Jakarta–Palembang	Bajrang Punia (IND)	Daichi Takatani (JPN)	Sirojiddin Khasanov (UZB)
2022 Hangzhou	Tömör-Ochiryn Tulga (MGL)	Rahman Amouzad (IRI)	Kaiki Yamaguchi (JPN)
2022 Hangzhou	Tömör-Ochiryn Tulga (MGL)	Rahman Amouzad (IRI)	Kim Kwang-jin (PRK)
2026 Aichi–Nagoya	Sujeet Kalkal (IND)	Abdulmazhid Kudiev (TJK)	Kotaro Kiyooka (JPN)
2026 Aichi–Nagoya	Sujeet Kalkal (IND)	Abdulmazhid Kudiev (TJK)	Nachyn Kuular (KAZ)

=== Light welterweight ===
- 70 kg: 2014

Games	Gold	Silver	Bronze
2014 Incheon	Bekzod Abdurakhmonov (UZB)	Oh Man-ho (KOR)	Takafumi Kojima (JPN)
2014 Incheon	Bekzod Abdurakhmonov (UZB)	Oh Man-ho (KOR)	Elaman Dogdurbek Uulu (KGZ)

=== Welterweight ===
- 73 kg: 1954–1958
- 78 kg: 1962–1966
- 74 kg: 1970–1994
- 76 kg: 1998
- 74 kg: 2002–

Games	Gold	Silver	Bronze
1954 Manila	Yutaka Kaneko (JPN)	Abdul Rashid (PAK)	Lim Bae-young (KOR)
1958 Tokyo	Yutaka Kaneko (JPN)	Tofigh Jahanbakht (IRN)	Muhammad Bashir (PAK)
1962 Jakarta	Yutaka Kaneko (JPN)	Muhammad Bashir (PAK)	Lakshmikant Pandey (IND)
1966 Bangkok	Muhammad Bashir (PAK)	Hossein Tahami (IRN)	Suh Young-suk (KOR)
1970 Bangkok	Toshitada Yoshida (JPN)	Mohammad Farhangdoust (IRN)	Mukhtiar Singh (IND)
1974 Tehran	Mansour Barzegar (IRN)	Danzandarjaagiin Sereeter (MGL)	Mitsuo Degawa (JPN)
1978 Bangkok	Rajinder Singh (IND)	Katsuya Kawada (JPN)	Jamtsyn Davaajav (MGL)
1982 New Delhi	Mohammad Hossein Mohebbi (IRN)	Go Jin-won (KOR)	Choe Sang-mo (PRK)
1986 Seoul	Han Myung-woo (KOR)	Allahmorad Zarini (IRN)	Tomohiro Tsunozaki (JPN)
1990 Beijing	Behrouz Yari (IRN)	Lodoin Enkhbayar (MGL)	Park Young-jin (KOR)
1994 Hiroshima	Behrouz Yari (IRI)	Takuya Ota (JPN)	Park Jang-soon (KOR)
1998 Bangkok	Moon Eui-jae (KOR)	Kenji Koshiba (JPN)	Ruslan Veliyev (KAZ)
2002 Busan	Cho Byung-kwan (KOR)	Yusup Abdusalomov (TJK)	Mehdi Hajizadeh (IRI)
2006 Doha	Ali Asghar Bazri (IRI)	Cho Byung-kwan (KOR)	Abdulkhakim Shapiyev (KAZ)
2006 Doha	Ali Asghar Bazri (IRI)	Cho Byung-kwan (KOR)	Soslan Tigiev (UZB)
2010 Guangzhou	Sadegh Goudarzi (IRI)	Kazuyuki Nagashima (JPN)	Lee Yun-seok (KOR)
2010 Guangzhou	Sadegh Goudarzi (IRI)	Kazuyuki Nagashima (JPN)	Dorjvaanchigiin Gombodorj (MGL)
2014 Incheon	Rashid Kurbanov (UZB)	Ezzatollah Akbari (IRI)	Narsingh Yadav (IND)
2014 Incheon	Rashid Kurbanov (UZB)	Ezzatollah Akbari (IRI)	Lee Sang-kyu (KOR)
2018 Jakarta–Palembang	Bekzod Abdurakhmonov (UZB)	Daniyar Kaisanov (KAZ)	Yuhi Fujinami (JPN)
2018 Jakarta–Palembang	Bekzod Abdurakhmonov (UZB)	Daniyar Kaisanov (KAZ)	Gong Byung-min (KOR)
2022 Hangzhou	Younes Emami (IRI)	Kirin Kinoshita (JPN)	Orozobek Toktomambetov (KGZ)
2022 Hangzhou	Younes Emami (IRI)	Kirin Kinoshita (JPN)	Bekzod Abdurakhmonov (UZB)
2026 Aichi–Nagoya	Younes Emami (IRI)	Yoshinosuke Aoyagi (JPN)	Nurkozha Kaipanov (KAZ)
2026 Aichi–Nagoya	Younes Emami (IRI)	Yoshinosuke Aoyagi (JPN)	Viktor Rassadin (TJK)

=== Middleweight ===
- 79 kg: 1954–1958
- 87 kg: 1962–1966
- 82 kg: 1970–1994
- 85 kg: 1998
- 84 kg: 2002–2010
- 86 kg: 2014–

Games	Gold	Silver	Bronze
1954 Manila	Kazuo Katsuramoto (JPN)	Nicolas Arcales (PHI)	Sohan Singh (IND)
1958 Tokyo	Takashi Nagai (JPN)	Nabi Sorouri (IRN)	Nicolas Arcales (PHI)
1962 Jakarta	Faiz Muhammad (PAK)	Sajjan Singh (IND)	Shunichi Kawano (JPN)
1966 Bangkok	Tatsuo Sasaki (JPN)	Mahmoud Moezzipour (IRN)	Sajjan Singh (IND)
1970 Bangkok	Tatsuo Sasaki (JPN)	Ali Hajiloo (IRN)	Netra Pal Singh (IND)
1974 Tehran	Hamid Alidousti (IRN)	Masaru Motegi (JPN)	Satpal Singh (IND)
1978 Bangkok	Masaru Motegi (JPN)	Aduuchiin Baatarkhüü (MGL)	Abdul-Rahman Breesam (IRQ)
1982 New Delhi	Zevegiin Düvchin (MGL)	Taj Mohammad Khairi (AFG)	Pak Gi-hong (PRK)
1986 Seoul	Oh Hyo-chul (KOR)	Takashi Kikuchi (JPN)	Mohammad Hossein Mohebbi (IRN)
1990 Beijing	Puntsagiin Sükhbat (MGL)	Ayat Vagozari (IRN)	Lee Dong-woo (KOR)
1994 Hiroshima	Amir Reza Khadem (IRI)	Elmadi Zhabrailov (KAZ)	Hidekazu Yokoyama (JPN)
1998 Bangkok	Alireza Heidari (IRI)	Rasul Katinovasov (UZB)	Magomed Kurugliyev (KAZ)
2002 Busan	Moon Eui-jae (KOR)	Magomed Kurugliyev (KAZ)	Shamil Aliev (TJK)
2006 Doha	Reza Yazdani (IRI)	Zaurbek Sokhiev (UZB)	Magomed Kurugliyev (KAZ)
2006 Doha	Reza Yazdani (IRI)	Zaurbek Sokhiev (UZB)	Noh Je-hyoun (KOR)
2010 Guangzhou	Jamal Mirzaei (IRI)	Lee Jae-sung (KOR)	Yermek Baiduashov (KAZ)
2010 Guangzhou	Jamal Mirzaei (IRI)	Lee Jae-sung (KOR)	Pürveegiin Ösökhbaatar (MGL)
2014 Incheon	Meisam Mostafa-Jokar (IRI)	Yesbolat Nurzhumbayev (KAZ)	Kim Gwan-uk (KOR)
2014 Incheon	Meisam Mostafa-Jokar (IRI)	Yesbolat Nurzhumbayev (KAZ)	Umidjon Ismanov (UZB)
2018 Jakarta–Palembang	Hassan Yazdani (IRI)	Domenic Abounader (LBN)	Adilet Davlumbayev (KAZ)
2018 Jakarta–Palembang	Hassan Yazdani (IRI)	Domenic Abounader (LBN)	Orgodolyn Üitümen (MGL)
2022 Hangzhou	Hassan Yazdani (IRI)	Deepak Punia (IND)	Döwletmyrat Orazgylyjow (TKM)
2022 Hangzhou	Hassan Yazdani (IRI)	Deepak Punia (IND)	Javrail Shapiev (UZB)
2026 Aichi–Nagoya	Mohammad Nokhodi (IRI)	Hayato Ishiguro (JPN)	Malik Shavaev (KGZ)
2026 Aichi–Nagoya	Mohammad Nokhodi (IRI)	Hayato Ishiguro (JPN)	Olonbayaryn Süldkhüü (MGL)

=== Light heavyweight ===
- 87 kg: 1958
- 97 kg: 1962–1966
- 90 kg: 1970–1994

Games	Gold	Silver	Bronze
1958 Tokyo	Gholamreza Takhti (IRN)	Haruo Takagi (JPN)	Hwang Chae-won (KOR)
1962 Jakarta	Maruti Mane (IND)	Haruo Takagi (JPN)	Muhammad Niaz (PAK)
1966 Bangkok	Mansour Mehdizadeh (IRN)	Bishwanath Singh (IND)	Shunichi Kawano (JPN)
1970 Bangkok	Dariush Zakeri (IRN)	Jit Singh (IND)	Koichi Tani (JPN)
1974 Tehran	Dashdorjiin Tserentogtokh (MGL)	Reza Khorrami (IRN)	Makoto Kamada (JPN)
1978 Bangkok	Kartar Singh (IND)	Chimidiin Gochoosüren (MGL)	Gao Jing (CHN)
1982 New Delhi	Mohammad Hassan Mohebbi (IRN)	Kartar Singh (IND)	Akira Ota (JPN)
1986 Seoul	Abdul Majeed Maruwala (PAK)	Mohammad Hassan Mohebbi (IRN)	Suresh Kumar (IND)
1990 Beijing	Oh Hyo-chul (KOR)	Qu Zhongdong (CHN)	Ayoub Baninosrat (IRN)
1994 Hiroshima	Rasoul Khadem (IRI)	Atsushi Ito (JPN)	Islam Bayramukov (KAZ)

=== Heavyweight ===
- +87 kg: 1954–1958
- +97 kg: 1962–1966
- 100 kg: 1970–1994
- 97 kg: 1998
- 96 kg: 2002–2010
- 97 kg: 2014–

Games	Gold	Silver	Bronze
1954 Manila	Kenzo Fukuda (JPN)	Baryalai Naseri (AFG)	None awarded
1958 Tokyo	Abbas Zandi (IRN)	Muhammad Nazir (PAK)	Mitsuhiro Ohira (JPN)
1962 Jakarta	Muhammad Saeed (PAK)	Ganpat Andalkar (IND)	Jiro Seki (JPN)
1966 Bangkok	Moslem Eskandar-Filabi (IRN)	Muhammad Saeed (PAK)	Bhim Singh (IND)
1970 Bangkok	Chandgi Ram (IND)	Shizuo Yada (JPN)	Abolfazl Anvari (IRN)
1974 Tehran	Khorloogiin Bayanmönkh (MGL)	Reza Soukhtehsaraei (IRN)	Sukhchain Singh Cheema (IND)
1978 Bangkok	Hiroshi Yamamoto (JPN)	Jamtsyn Bor (MGL)	Muhammad Salahuddin (PAK)
1982 New Delhi	Satpal Singh (IND)	Dashdorjiin Tserentogtokh (MGL)	Mahmoud Moradi Ganji (IRN)
1986 Seoul	Kartar Singh (IND)	Shahid Pervaiz Butt (PAK)	Kazem Gholami (IRN)
1990 Beijing	Kim Tae-woo (KOR)	Boldyn Javkhlantögs (MGL)	Subhash Verma (IND)
1994 Hiroshima	Kim Tae-woo (KOR)	Ayoub Baninosrat (IRI)	Bat-Erdeniin Battogtokh (MGL)
1998 Bangkok	Abbas Jadidi (IRI)	Dolgorsürengiin Sumiyaabazar (MGL)	Soslan Fraev (UZB)
2002 Busan	Alireza Heidari (IRI)	Aleksey Krupnyakov (KGZ)	Magomed Ibragimov (UZB)
2006 Doha	Alireza Heidari (IRI)	Oleg Kallagov (UZB)	Taimuraz Tigiyev (KAZ)
2006 Doha	Alireza Heidari (IRI)	Oleg Kallagov (UZB)	Aleksey Krupnyakov (KGZ)
2010 Guangzhou	Reza Yazdani (IRI)	Kurban Kurbanov (UZB)	Mausam Khatri (IND)
2010 Guangzhou	Reza Yazdani (IRI)	Kurban Kurbanov (UZB)	Takao Isokawa (JPN)
2014 Incheon	Reza Yazdani (IRI)	Magomed Musaev (KGZ)	Mamed Ibragimov (KAZ)
2014 Incheon	Reza Yazdani (IRI)	Magomed Musaev (KGZ)	Dorjkhandyn Khüderbulga (MGL)
2018 Jakarta–Palembang	Alireza Karimi (IRI)	Magomed Musaev (KGZ)	Kim Jae-gang (KOR)
2018 Jakarta–Palembang	Alireza Karimi (IRI)	Magomed Musaev (KGZ)	Magomed Ibragimov (UZB)
2022 Hangzhou	Akhmed Tazhudinov (BRN)	Mojtaba Goleij (IRI)	Habila Awusayiman (CHN)
2022 Hangzhou	Akhmed Tazhudinov (BRN)	Mojtaba Goleij (IRI)	Ganbaataryn Gankhuyag (MGL)
2026 Aichi–Nagoya	Amir Ali Azarpira (IRI)	Sherzod Poyonov (UZB)	Deepak Punia (IND)
2026 Aichi–Nagoya	Amir Ali Azarpira (IRI)	Sherzod Poyonov (UZB)	Arash Yoshida (JPN)

=== Super heavyweight ===
- +100 kg: 1970–1982
- 130 kg: 1986–1998
- 120 kg: 2002–2010
- 125 kg: 2014–

Games	Gold	Silver	Bronze
1970 Bangkok	Moslem Eskandar-Filabi (IRN)	Yorihide Isogai (JPN)	Maroof Khan (PAK)
1974 Tehran	Moslem Eskandar-Filabi (IRN)	Shared gold	Maroof Khan (PAK)
1974 Tehran	Yorihide Isogai (JPN)	Shared gold	Maroof Khan (PAK)
1978 Bangkok	Yoshiaki Yatsu (JPN)	Satpal Singh (IND)	Javed Iqbal (PAK)
1982 New Delhi	Reza Soukhtehsaraei (IRN)	Farhan Jassim (IRQ)	Rajinder Singh (IND)
1986 Seoul	Alireza Soleimani (IRN)	Farhan Jassim (IRQ)	Gurmukh Singh (IND)
1990 Beijing	Reza Soukhtehsaraei (IRN)	Aduuchiin Baatarkhüü (MGL)	Jo Byung-eun (KOR)
1994 Hiroshima	Ebrahim Mehraban (IRI)	Igor Klimov (KAZ)	Kim Ik-hee (KOR)
1998 Bangkok	Alireza Rezaei (IRI)	Georgy Kaysinov (UZB)	Gelegjamtsyn Ösökhbayar (MGL)
2002 Busan	Artur Taymazov (UZB)	Abbas Jadidi (IRI)	Palwinder Singh Cheema (IND)
2006 Doha	Artur Taymazov (UZB)	Fardin Masoumi (IRI)	Palwinder Singh Cheema (IND)
2006 Doha	Artur Taymazov (UZB)	Fardin Masoumi (IRI)	Lee Se-hyung (KOR)
2010 Guangzhou	Artur Taymazov (UZB)	Jargalsaikhany Chuluunbat (MGL)	Liang Lei (CHN)
2010 Guangzhou	Artur Taymazov (UZB)	Jargalsaikhany Chuluunbat (MGL)	Fardin Masoumi (IRI)
2014 Incheon	Parviz Hadi (IRI)	Daulet Shabanbay (KAZ)	Nobuyoshi Arakida (JPN)
2014 Incheon	Parviz Hadi (IRI)	Daulet Shabanbay (KAZ)	Nam Kyung-jin (KOR)
2018 Jakarta–Palembang	Parviz Hadi (IRI)	Deng Zhiwei (CHN)	Nam Kyung-jin (KOR)
2018 Jakarta–Palembang	Parviz Hadi (IRI)	Deng Zhiwei (CHN)	Davit Modzmanashvili (UZB)
2022 Hangzhou	Amir Hossein Zare (IRI)	Mönkhtöriin Lkhagvagerel (MGL)	Buheeerdun (CHN)
2022 Hangzhou	Amir Hossein Zare (IRI)	Mönkhtöriin Lkhagvagerel (MGL)	Aiaal Lazarev (KGZ)
2026 Aichi–Nagoya	Amir Hossein Zare (IRI)	Buheeerdun (CHN)	Shamil Sharipov (BRN)
2026 Aichi–Nagoya	Amir Hossein Zare (IRI)	Buheeerdun (CHN)	Yedige Kassimbek (KAZ)

== Men's Greco-Roman ==
=== Light flyweight ===
- 48 kg: 1974–1994

Games	Gold	Silver	Bronze
1974 Tehran	Rahim Aliabadi (IRN)	Kazuharu Ishida (JPN)	Bang Dae-du (KOR)
1986 Seoul	Kim Young-gu (KOR)	Li Haisheng (CHN)	Ikuzo Saito (JPN)
1990 Beijing	Goun Duk-yong (KOR)	Han Sang-jik (PRK)	Reza Simkhah (IRN)
1994 Hiroshima	Sim Kwon-ho (KOR)	Reza Simkhah (IRI)	Ruslan Gebekov (KGZ)

=== Flyweight ===
- 52 kg: 1962–1994
- 54 kg: 1998

Games	Gold	Silver	Bronze
1962 Jakarta	Malwa Singh (IND)	Tsutomu Hanahara (JPN)	Mujari (INA)
1974 Tehran	Koichiro Hirayama (JPN)	Baek Seung-hyun (KOR)	Mohammad Aslam (AFG)
1986 Seoul	Atsuji Miyahara (JPN)	Abdolkarim Kakahaji (IRN)	Lee Jin-hi (KOR)
1990 Beijing	An Han-bong (KOR)	Hu Richa (CHN)	Pak Bom-su (PRK)
1994 Hiroshima	Min Kyung-gab (KOR)	Khaled Al-Faraj (SYR)	Shamsiddin Khudoyberdiev (UZB)
1998 Bangkok	Sim Kwon-ho (KOR)	Kang Yong-gyun (PRK)	Wang Hui (CHN)

=== Bantamweight ===
- 57 kg: 1962–1994
- 58 kg: 1998
- 55 kg: 2002–2010
- 59 kg: 2014
- 60 kg: 2018–

Games	Gold	Silver	Bronze
1962 Jakarta	Masamitsu Ichiguchi (JPN)	Siraj Din (PAK)	Narin Ghume (IND)
1974 Tehran	Hossein Touranian (IRN)	An Han-young (KOR)	Yoji Sakurama (JPN)
1986 Seoul	Shunji Nakadome (JPN)	Ba Sier (CHN)	Kim Seong-min (KOR)
1990 Beijing	Shi Jin-chul (KOR)	Yang Changling (CHN)	Ahad Pazaj (IRN)
1994 Hiroshima	Yuriy Melnichenko (KAZ)	Sheng Zetian (CHN)	Lee Tae-ho (KOR)
1998 Bangkok	Kim In-sub (KOR)	Asliddin Khudoyberdiev (UZB)	Sheng Zetian (CHN)
2002 Busan	Asset Imanbayev (KAZ)	Kang Yong-gyun (PRK)	Uran Kalilov (KGZ)
2006 Doha	Jiao Huafeng (CHN)	Jasem Amiri (IRI)	Vinayak Dalvi (IND)
2006 Doha	Jiao Huafeng (CHN)	Jasem Amiri (IRI)	Cha Kwang-su (PRK)
2010 Guangzhou	Kohei Hasegawa (JPN)	Kanybek Zholchubekov (KGZ)	Li Shujin (CHN)
2010 Guangzhou	Kohei Hasegawa (JPN)	Kanybek Zholchubekov (KGZ)	Marat Karishalov (KAZ)
2014 Incheon	Kohei Hasegawa (JPN)	Yun Won-chol (PRK)	Tian Qiye (CHN)
2014 Incheon	Kohei Hasegawa (JPN)	Yun Won-chol (PRK)	Almat Kebispayev (KAZ)
2018 Jakarta–Palembang	Shinobu Ota (JPN)	Kanybek Zholchubekov (KGZ)	Mehrdad Mardani (IRI)
2018 Jakarta–Palembang	Shinobu Ota (JPN)	Kanybek Zholchubekov (KGZ)	Meirambek Ainagulov (KAZ)
2022 Hangzhou	Zholaman Sharshenbekov (KGZ)	Ayata Suzuki (JPN)	Chung Han-jae (KOR)
2022 Hangzhou	Zholaman Sharshenbekov (KGZ)	Ayata Suzuki (JPN)	Ri Se-ung (PRK)
2026 Aichi–Nagoya	Zholaman Sharshenbekov (KGZ)	Alisher Ganiev (UZB)	Sajjad Ali (IRQ)
2026 Aichi–Nagoya	Zholaman Sharshenbekov (KGZ)	Alisher Ganiev (UZB)	Ayata Suzuki (JPN)

=== Featherweight ===
- 63 kg: 1962
- 62 kg: 1974–1994
- 63 kg: 1998
- 60 kg: 2002–2010

Games	Gold	Silver	Bronze
1962 Jakarta	Tokuaki Fujita (JPN)	Muhammad Akhtar (PAK)	Rachman Firdaus (INA)
1974 Tehran	Akbar Yadollahi (IRN)	Teruhiko Miyahara (JPN)	Choi Kyung-soo (KOR)
1986 Seoul	Seiichi Osanai (JPN)	An Dae-hyun (KOR)	Ahad Javansalehi (IRN)
1990 Beijing	Shigeki Nishiguchi (JPN)	Hassan Yousefi Afshar (IRN)	Hu Guohong (CHN)
1994 Hiroshima	Choi Sang-sun (KOR)	Akhmetulla Nurov (KAZ)	Bakhodir Kurbanov (UZB)
1998 Bangkok	Choi Sang-sun (KOR)	Bakhodir Kurbanov (UZB)	Yi Shanjun (CHN)
2002 Busan	Kang Kyung-il (KOR)	Dilshod Aripov (UZB)	Makoto Sasamoto (JPN)
2006 Doha	Makoto Sasamoto (JPN)	Sheng Jiang (CHN)	Ruslan Tyumenbayev (KGZ)
2006 Doha	Makoto Sasamoto (JPN)	Sheng Jiang (CHN)	Dilshod Aripov (UZB)
2010 Guangzhou	Omid Norouzi (IRI)	Jung Ji-hyun (KOR)	Ravinder Singh (IND)
2010 Guangzhou	Omid Norouzi (IRI)	Jung Ji-hyun (KOR)	Ryutaro Matsumoto (JPN)

=== Lightweight ===
- 70 kg: 1962
- 68 kg: 1974–1994
- 69 kg: 1998
- 66 kg: 2002–2014
- 67 kg: 2018–

Games	Gold	Silver	Bronze
1962 Jakarta	Yoichi Sasaki (JPN)	Udey Chand (IND)	Ghulam Rasool (PAK)
1974 Tehran	Mohammad Dalirian (IRN)	Bae Ki-youl (KOR)	Tsedendambyn Natsagdorj (MGL)
1986 Seoul	Lee Sam-sung (KOR)	Takumi Mori (JPN)	A Ji (CHN)
1990 Beijing	Moon Chung-sik (KOR)	Yi Libatu (CHN)	Takumi Mori (JPN)
1994 Hiroshima	Kim Young-il (KOR)	Grigori Pulyaev (UZB)	Takumi Mori (JPN)
1998 Bangkok	Son Sang-pil (KOR)	Mkhitar Manukyan (KAZ)	Grigori Pulyaev (UZB)
2002 Busan	Kim In-sub (KOR)	Daniar Kobonov (KGZ)	Kim Yun-mo (PRK)
2006 Doha	Kim Min-chul (KOR)	Ravshan Ruzikulov (UZB)	Hamid Reihani (IRI)
2006 Doha	Kim Min-chul (KOR)	Ravshan Ruzikulov (UZB)	Masaki Imuro (JPN)
2010 Guangzhou	Saeid Abdevali (IRI)	Darkhan Bayakhmetov (KAZ)	Sunil Kumar Rana (IND)
2010 Guangzhou	Saeid Abdevali (IRI)	Darkhan Bayakhmetov (KAZ)	Tsutomu Fujimura (JPN)
2014 Incheon	Ryu Han-su (KOR)	Ryutaro Matsumoto (JPN)	Afshin Biabangard (IRI)
2014 Incheon	Ryu Han-su (KOR)	Ryutaro Matsumoto (JPN)	Ri Hak-won (PRK)
2018 Jakarta–Palembang	Ryu Han-su (KOR)	Almat Kebispayev (KAZ)	Mohammad Reza Geraei (IRI)
2018 Jakarta–Palembang	Ryu Han-su (KOR)	Almat Kebispayev (KAZ)	Amantur Ismailov (KGZ)
2022 Hangzhou	Katsuaki Endo (JPN)	Meirzhan Shermakhanbet (KAZ)	Danial Sohrabi (IRI)
2022 Hangzhou	Katsuaki Endo (JPN)	Meirzhan Shermakhanbet (KAZ)	Razzak Beishekeev (KGZ)
2026 Aichi–Nagoya	Aytjan Khalmakhanov (UZB)	Kyotaro Sogabe (JPN)	Meirzhan Shermakhanbet (KAZ)
2026 Aichi–Nagoya	Aytjan Khalmakhanov (UZB)	Kyotaro Sogabe (JPN)	Razzak Beishekeev (KGZ)

=== Light welterweight ===
- 71 kg: 2014

Games	Gold	Silver	Bronze
2014 Incheon	Jung Ji-hyun (KOR)	Dilshod Turdiev (UZB)	Saeid Abdevali (IRI)
2014 Incheon	Jung Ji-hyun (KOR)	Dilshod Turdiev (UZB)	Şermet Permanow (TKM)

=== Welterweight ===
- 78 kg: 1962
- 74 kg: 1974–1994
- 76 kg: 1998
- 74 kg: 2002–2010
- 75 kg: 2014
- 77 kg: 2018–

Games	Gold	Silver	Bronze
1962 Jakarta	Yutaka Kaneko (JPN)	Muhammad Bashir (PAK)	Oh Jae-young (KOR)
1974 Tehran	Hashem Ghanbari (IRN)	Kang Yong-sik (KOR)	Yasuo Nagatomo (JPN)
1986 Seoul	Kim Young-nam (KOR)	Reza Andouz (IRN)	Hiromichi Ito (JPN)
1990 Beijing	Han Chee-ho (KOR)	Hiromichi Ito (JPN)	Masoud Ghadimi (IRN)
1994 Hiroshima	Han Chee-ho (KOR)	Ruslan Zhumabekov (KAZ)	Takamitsu Katayama (JPN)
1998 Bangkok	Bakhtiyar Baiseitov (KAZ)	Takamitsu Katayama (JPN)	Kim Jung-sub (KOR)
2002 Busan	Kim Jin-soo (KOR)	Danil Khalimov (KAZ)	Parviz Zeidvand (IRI)
2006 Doha	Roman Melyoshin (KAZ)	Davoud Abedinzadeh (IRI)	Daniar Kobonov (KGZ)
2006 Doha	Roman Melyoshin (KAZ)	Davoud Abedinzadeh (IRI)	Bakhit Sharif Badr (QAT)
2010 Guangzhou	Daniar Kobonov (KGZ)	Tsukasa Tsurumaki (JPN)	Farshad Alizadeh (IRI)
2010 Guangzhou	Daniar Kobonov (KGZ)	Tsukasa Tsurumaki (JPN)	Park Jin-sung (KOR)
2014 Incheon	Kim Hyeon-woo (KOR)	Takehiro Kanakubo (JPN)	Payam Boveiri (IRI)
2014 Incheon	Kim Hyeon-woo (KOR)	Takehiro Kanakubo (JPN)	Doszhan Kartikov (KAZ)
2018 Jakarta–Palembang	Mohammad Ali Geraei (IRI)	Akzhol Makhmudov (KGZ)	Yang Bin (CHN)
2018 Jakarta–Palembang	Mohammad Ali Geraei (IRI)	Akzhol Makhmudov (KGZ)	Kim Hyeon-woo (KOR)
2022 Hangzhou	Akzhol Makhmudov (KGZ)	Amin Kavianinejad (IRI)	Liu Rui (CHN)
2022 Hangzhou	Akzhol Makhmudov (KGZ)	Amin Kavianinejad (IRI)	Azat Sadykov (KAZ)
2026 Aichi–Nagoya	Alireza Abdevali (IRI)	Nao Kusaka (JPN)	Akzhol Makhmudov (KGZ)
2026 Aichi–Nagoya	Alireza Abdevali (IRI)	Nao Kusaka (JPN)	Shahin Badaghi (QAT)

=== Light middleweight ===
- 80 kg: 2014

Games	Gold	Silver	Bronze
2014 Incheon	Habibollah Akhlaghi (IRI)	Tsukasa Tsurumaki (JPN)	Janarbek Kenjeev (KGZ)
2014 Incheon	Habibollah Akhlaghi (IRI)	Tsukasa Tsurumaki (JPN)	Besiki Saldadze (UZB)

=== Middleweight ===
- 87 kg: 1962
- 82 kg: 1974–1994
- 85 kg: 1998
- 84 kg: 2002–2010
- 85 kg: 2014
- 87 kg: 2018–

Games	Gold	Silver	Bronze
1962 Jakarta	Shunichi Kawano (JPN)	Sajjan Singh (IND)	Faiz Muhammad (PAK)
1974 Tehran	Sadao Sato (JPN)	Khosro Nezafatdoust (IRN)	Dügeriin Tserendash (MGL)
1986 Seoul	Kim Sang-kyu (KOR)	Takahiro Mukai (JPN)	Fereydoun Behnampour (IRN)
1990 Beijing	Kim Sang-kyu (KOR)	Li Daxin (CHN)	Mohammad Zayar (SYR)
1994 Hiroshima	Daulet Turlykhanov (KAZ)	Raatbek Sanatbayev (KGZ)	Kim Yeon-soo (KOR)
1998 Bangkok	Park Myung-suk (KOR)	Raatbek Sanatbayev (KGZ)	Hidekazu Yokoyama (JPN)
2002 Busan	Shingo Matsumoto (JPN)	Kim Jung-sub (KOR)	Mohammad Al-Ken (SYR)
2006 Doha	Kim Jung-sub (KOR)	Yahia Abutabeekh (JOR)	Shingo Matsumoto (JPN)
2006 Doha	Kim Jung-sub (KOR)	Yahia Abutabeekh (JOR)	Janarbek Kenjeev (KGZ)
2010 Guangzhou	Taleb Nematpour (IRI)	Lee Se-yeol (KOR)	Alkhazur Ozdiyev (KAZ)
2010 Guangzhou	Taleb Nematpour (IRI)	Lee Se-yeol (KOR)	Janarbek Kenjeev (KGZ)
2014 Incheon	Rustam Assakalov (UZB)	Lee Se-yeol (KOR)	Peng Fei (CHN)
2014 Incheon	Rustam Assakalov (UZB)	Lee Se-yeol (KOR)	Mojtaba Karimfar (IRI)
2018 Jakarta–Palembang	Hossein Nouri (IRI)	Rustam Assakalov (UZB)	Azamat Kustubayev (KAZ)
2018 Jakarta–Palembang	Hossein Nouri (IRI)	Rustam Assakalov (UZB)	Şyhazberdi Öwelekow (TKM)
2022 Hangzhou	Jalgasbay Berdimuratov (UZB)	Nasser Alizadeh (IRI)	Sunil Kumar (IND)
2022 Hangzhou	Jalgasbay Berdimuratov (UZB)	Nasser Alizadeh (IRI)	Masato Sumi (JPN)
2026 Aichi–Nagoya	Taizo Yoshida (JPN)	Asan Zhanyshov (KGZ)	Sunil Kumar (IND)
2026 Aichi–Nagoya	Taizo Yoshida (JPN)	Asan Zhanyshov (KGZ)	Jalgasbay Berdimuratov (UZB)

=== Light heavyweight ===
- 97 kg: 1962
- 90 kg: 1974–1994

Games	Gold	Silver	Bronze
1962 Jakarta	Muhammad Niaz (PAK)	Maruti Mane (IND)	Shared silver
1962 Jakarta	Muhammad Niaz (PAK)	Haruo Takagi (JPN)	Shared silver
1974 Tehran	Jalal Karimi (IRN)	Yoshihiro Fujita (JPN)	Jigjidiin Mönkhbat (MGL)
1986 Seoul	Yasutoshi Moriyama (JPN)	Ao Rong (CHN)	Eom Jin-han (KOR)
1990 Beijing	Eom Jin-han (KOR)	Gu Maosheng (CHN)	Yasutoshi Moriyama (JPN)
1994 Hiroshima	Eom Jin-han (KOR)	Hassan Babak (IRI)	Yasutoshi Moriyama (JPN)

=== Heavyweight ===
- +97 kg: 1962
- 100 kg: 1974–1994
- 97 kg: 1998
- 96 kg: 2002–2010
- 98 kg: 2014
- 97 kg: 2018–

Games	Gold	Silver	Bronze
1962 Jakarta	Ganpat Andalkar (IND)	Muhammad Saeed (PAK)	Jiro Seki (JPN)
1974 Tehran	Bahram Moshtaghi (IRN)	Khorloogiin Bayanmönkh (MGL)	Sukhchain Singh Cheema (IND)
1986 Seoul	Kim Gi-jung (KOR)	Bao Yu (CHN)	Tsutomu Kondo (JPN)
1990 Beijing	Bao Yu (CHN)	Mohammad Naderi (IRN)	Ahmad Al-Shami (SYR)
1994 Hiroshima	Song Sung-il (KOR)	Vitaliy Leikin (KAZ)	Takashi Nonomura (JPN)
1998 Bangkok	Sergey Matviyenko (KAZ)	Mohammad Al-Haiek (SYR)	Park Woo (KOR)
2002 Busan	Aleksey Cheglakov (UZB)	Park Myung-suk (KOR)	Masoud Hashemzadeh (IRI)
2006 Doha	Han Tae-young (KOR)	Masoud Hashemzadeh (IRI)	Mohammad Al-Ken (SYR)
2006 Doha	Han Tae-young (KOR)	Masoud Hashemzadeh (IRI)	Gennady Chkhaidze (UZB)
2010 Guangzhou	Babak Ghorbani (IRI)	Asset Mambetov (KAZ)	An Chang-gun (KOR)
2010 Guangzhou	Babak Ghorbani (IRI)	Asset Mambetov (KAZ)	Davyd Saldadze (UZB)
2014 Incheon	Mehdi Aliyari (IRI)	Xiao Di (CHN)	Norikatsu Saikawa (JPN)
2014 Incheon	Mehdi Aliyari (IRI)	Xiao Di (CHN)	Yerulan Iskakov (KAZ)
2018 Jakarta–Palembang	Cho Hyo-chul (KOR)	Xiao Di (CHN)	Yerulan Iskakov (KAZ)
2018 Jakarta–Palembang	Cho Hyo-chul (KOR)	Xiao Di (CHN)	Uzur Dzhuzupbekov (KGZ)
2022 Hangzhou	Mohammad Hadi Saravi (IRI)	Li Yiming (CHN)	Takahiro Tsuruda (JPN)
2022 Hangzhou	Mohammad Hadi Saravi (IRI)	Li Yiming (CHN)	Rustam Assakalov (UZB)
2026 Aichi–Nagoya	Yuri Nakazato (JPN)	Nitesh Siwach (IND)	Mehdi Bali (IRI)
2026 Aichi–Nagoya	Yuri Nakazato (JPN)	Nitesh Siwach (IND)	Ganbaataryn Gankhuyag (MGL)

=== Super heavyweight ===
- +100 kg: 1974
- 130 kg: 1986–1998
- 120 kg: 2002–2010
- 130 kg: 2014–

Games	Gold	Silver	Bronze
1974 Tehran	Moslem Eskandar-Filabi (IRN)	Yorihide Isogai (JPN)	Doljingiin Adiyaatömör (MGL)
1986 Seoul	Reza Soukhtehsaraei (IRN)	Masaya Ando (JPN)	Kim Dae-kwan (KOR)
1990 Beijing	Hu Riga (CHN)	Alireza Lorestani (IRN)	Hidenori Nara (JPN)
1994 Hiroshima	Yang Young-jin (KOR)	Kenichi Suzuki (JPN)	Hu Riga (CHN)
1998 Bangkok	Mehdi Sabzali (IRI)	Shermukhammad Kuziev (UZB)	Zhao Hailin (CHN)
2002 Busan	Georgiy Tsurtsumia (KAZ)	Yang Young-jin (KOR)	Alireza Gharibi (IRI)
2006 Doha	Kim Gwang-seok (KOR)	Mehdi Sharabiani (IRI)	Liu Deli (CHN)
2006 Doha	Kim Gwang-seok (KOR)	Mehdi Sharabiani (IRI)	Nurbek Ibragimov (KGZ)
2010 Guangzhou	Nurmakhan Tinaliyev (KAZ)	Liu Deli (CHN)	Ali Nadhim (IRQ)
2010 Guangzhou	Nurmakhan Tinaliyev (KAZ)	Liu Deli (CHN)	Murodjon Tuychiev (TJK)
2014 Incheon	Nurmakhan Tinaliyev (KAZ)	Kim Yong-min (KOR)	Meng Qiang (CHN)
2014 Incheon	Nurmakhan Tinaliyev (KAZ)	Kim Yong-min (KOR)	Bashir Babajanzadeh (IRI)
2018 Jakarta–Palembang	Muminjon Abdullaev (UZB)	Nurmakhan Tinaliyev (KAZ)	Arata Sonoda (JPN)
2018 Jakarta–Palembang	Muminjon Abdullaev (UZB)	Nurmakhan Tinaliyev (KAZ)	Kim Min-seok (KOR)
2022 Hangzhou	Amin Mirzazadeh (IRI)	Meng Lingzhe (CHN)	Alimkhan Syzdykov (KAZ)
2022 Hangzhou	Amin Mirzazadeh (IRI)	Meng Lingzhe (CHN)	Kim Min-seok (KOR)
2026 Aichi–Nagoya	Amin Mirzazadeh (IRI)	Rafael Tsitsuashvili (UZB)	Meng Lingzhe (CHN)
2026 Aichi–Nagoya	Amin Mirzazadeh (IRI)	Rafael Tsitsuashvili (UZB)	Kim Min-seok (KOR)

== Women's freestyle ==
=== Flyweight ===
- 48 kg: 2002–2014
- 50 kg: 2018–

Games	Gold	Silver	Bronze
2002 Busan	Zhong Xiue (CHN)	Lidiya Karamchakova (TJK)	Tsogtbazaryn Enkhjargal (MGL)
2006 Doha	Chiharu Icho (JPN)	Kim Hyung-joo (KOR)	Li Xiaomei (CHN)
2006 Doha	Chiharu Icho (JPN)	Kim Hyung-joo (KOR)	Tsogtbazaryn Enkhjargal (MGL)
2010 Guangzhou	So Sim-hyang (PRK)	Nguyễn Thị Lụa (VIE)	Hitomi Sakamoto (JPN)
2010 Guangzhou	So Sim-hyang (PRK)	Nguyễn Thị Lụa (VIE)	Kim Hyung-joo (KOR)
2014 Incheon	Eri Tosaka (JPN)	Sun Yanan (CHN)	Vinesh Phogat (IND)
2014 Incheon	Eri Tosaka (JPN)	Sun Yanan (CHN)	Tatyana Amanzhol (KAZ)
2018 Jakarta–Palembang	Vinesh Phogat (IND)	Yuki Irie (JPN)	Kim Hyung-joo (KOR)
2018 Jakarta–Palembang	Vinesh Phogat (IND)	Yuki Irie (JPN)	Kim Son-hyang (PRK)
2022 Hangzhou	Remina Yoshimoto (JPN)	Kim Son-hyang (PRK)	Zhu Jiang (CHN)
2022 Hangzhou	Remina Yoshimoto (JPN)	Kim Son-hyang (PRK)	Aktenge Keunimjaeva (UZB)
2026 Aichi–Nagoya	Yui Susaki (JPN)	Kim Son-hyang (PRK)	Feng Ziqi (CHN)
2026 Aichi–Nagoya	Yui Susaki (JPN)	Kim Son-hyang (PRK)	Zeinep Bayanova (KAZ)

=== Bantamweight ===
- 53 kg: 2018–

Games	Gold	Silver	Bronze
2018 Jakarta–Palembang	Pak Yong-mi (PRK)	Zhuldyz Eshimova (KAZ)	Haruna Okuno (JPN)
2018 Jakarta–Palembang	Pak Yong-mi (PRK)	Zhuldyz Eshimova (KAZ)	Erdenechimegiin Sumiyaa (MGL)
2022 Hangzhou	Akari Fujinami (JPN)	Pang Qianyu (CHN)	Antim Panghal (IND)
2022 Hangzhou	Akari Fujinami (JPN)	Pang Qianyu (CHN)	Choe Hyo-gyong (PRK)
2026 Aichi–Nagoya	Moe Kiyooka (JPN)	Antim Panghal (IND)	Zhang Jin (CHN)
2026 Aichi–Nagoya	Moe Kiyooka (JPN)	Antim Panghal (IND)	Bayanmönkhiin Otgontuyaa (MGL)

=== Lightweight ===
- 55 kg: 2002–2014
- 57 kg: 2018–

Games	Gold	Silver	Bronze
2002 Busan	Saori Yoshida (JPN)	Lee Na-lae (KOR)	Naidangiin Otgonjargal (MGL)
2006 Doha	Saori Yoshida (JPN)	Olga Smirnova (KAZ)	Alka Tomar (IND)
2006 Doha	Saori Yoshida (JPN)	Olga Smirnova (KAZ)	Naidangiin Otgonjargal (MGL)
2010 Guangzhou	Saori Yoshida (JPN)	Zhang Lan (CHN)	Aiyim Abdildina (KAZ)
2010 Guangzhou	Saori Yoshida (JPN)	Zhang Lan (CHN)	Pak Yon-hui (PRK)
2014 Incheon	Saori Yoshida (JPN)	Sündeviin Byambatseren (MGL)	Zhong Xuechun (CHN)
2014 Incheon	Saori Yoshida (JPN)	Sündeviin Byambatseren (MGL)	Aisuluu Tynybekova (KGZ)
2018 Jakarta–Palembang	Jong Myong-suk (PRK)	Pei Xingru (CHN)	Katsuki Sakagami (JPN)
2018 Jakarta–Palembang	Jong Myong-suk (PRK)	Pei Xingru (CHN)	Altantsetsegiin Battsetseg (MGL)
2022 Hangzhou	Tsugumi Sakurai (JPN)	Jong In-sun (PRK)	Hong Kexin (CHN)
2022 Hangzhou	Tsugumi Sakurai (JPN)	Jong In-sun (PRK)	Laylokhon Sobirova (UZB)
2026 Aichi–Nagoya	Hong Kexin (CHN)	Son Il-sim (PRK)	Akari Fujinami (JPN)
2026 Aichi–Nagoya	Hong Kexin (CHN)	Son Il-sim (PRK)	Nilufar Raimova (KAZ)

=== Middleweight ===
- 63 kg: 2002–2014
- 62 kg: 2018–

Games	Gold	Silver	Bronze
2002 Busan	Xu Haiyan (CHN)	Kaori Icho (JPN)	Ochirbatyn Myagmarsüren (MGL)
2006 Doha	Kaori Icho (JPN)	Geetika Jakhar (IND)	Xu Haiyan (CHN)
2006 Doha	Kaori Icho (JPN)	Geetika Jakhar (IND)	Badrakhyn Odonchimeg (MGL)
2010 Guangzhou	Yelena Shalygina (KAZ)	Ochirbatyn Nasanburmaa (MGL)	Chen Meng (CHN)
2010 Guangzhou	Yelena Shalygina (KAZ)	Ochirbatyn Nasanburmaa (MGL)	Park Sang-eun (KOR)
2014 Incheon	Rio Watari (JPN)	Xiluo Zhuoma (CHN)	Geetika Jakhar (IND)
2014 Incheon	Rio Watari (JPN)	Xiluo Zhuoma (CHN)	Sükheegiin Tserenchimed (MGL)
2018 Jakarta–Palembang	Aisuluu Tynybekova (KGZ)	Risako Kawai (JPN)	Rim Jong-sim (PRK)
2018 Jakarta–Palembang	Aisuluu Tynybekova (KGZ)	Risako Kawai (JPN)	Nguyễn Thị Mỹ Hạnh (VIE)
2022 Hangzhou	Mun Hyon-gyong (PRK)	Nonoka Ozaki (JPN)	Sonam Malik (IND)
2022 Hangzhou	Mun Hyon-gyong (PRK)	Nonoka Ozaki (JPN)	Aisuluu Tynybekova (KGZ)
2026 Aichi–Nagoya	Nonoka Ozaki (JPN)	Kim Ok-ju (PRK)	Zhang Qi (CHN)
2026 Aichi–Nagoya	Nonoka Ozaki (JPN)	Kim Ok-ju (PRK)	Togtokhyn Altjin (MGL)

=== Light heavyweight ===
- 68 kg: 2018–

Games	Gold	Silver	Bronze
2018 Jakarta–Palembang	Zhou Feng (CHN)	Sharkhüügiin Tümentsetseg (MGL)	Divya Kakran (IND)
2018 Jakarta–Palembang	Zhou Feng (CHN)	Sharkhüügiin Tümentsetseg (MGL)	Meerim Zhumanazarova (KGZ)
2022 Hangzhou	Zhou Feng (CHN)	Nurzat Nurtaeva (KGZ)	Naruha Matsuyuki (JPN)
2022 Hangzhou	Zhou Feng (CHN)	Nurzat Nurtaeva (KGZ)	Enkhsaikhany Delgermaa (MGL)
2026 Aichi–Nagoya	Ami Ishii (JPN)	Pak Sol-gum (PRK)	Long Jia (CHN)
2026 Aichi–Nagoya	Ami Ishii (JPN)	Pak Sol-gum (PRK)	Meerim Zhumanazarova (KGZ)

=== Heavyweight ===
- 72 kg: 2002–2010
- 75 kg: 2014
- 76 kg: 2018–

Games	Gold	Silver	Bronze
2002 Busan	Kyoko Hamaguchi (JPN)	Kang Min-jeong (KOR)	Yana Panova (KGZ)
2006 Doha	Wang Xu (CHN)	Kyoko Hamaguchi (JPN)	Yana Panova (KGZ)
2006 Doha	Wang Xu (CHN)	Kyoko Hamaguchi (JPN)	Ochirbatyn Burmaa (MGL)
2010 Guangzhou	Gelegjamtsyn Naranchimeg (MGL)	Li Dan (CHN)	Kyoko Hamaguchi (JPN)
2010 Guangzhou	Gelegjamtsyn Naranchimeg (MGL)	Li Dan (CHN)	Guzel Manyurova (KAZ)
2014 Incheon	Zhou Feng (CHN)	Guzel Manyurova (KAZ)	Hwang Eun-ju (KOR)
2014 Incheon	Zhou Feng (CHN)	Guzel Manyurova (KAZ)	Ochirbatyn Burmaa (MGL)
2018 Jakarta–Palembang	Zhou Qian (CHN)	Hiroe Minagawa (JPN)	Elmira Syzdykova (KAZ)
2018 Jakarta–Palembang	Zhou Qian (CHN)	Hiroe Minagawa (JPN)	Aiperi Medet Kyzy (KGZ)
2022 Hangzhou	Aiperi Medet Kyzy (KGZ)	Zhamila Bakbergenova (KAZ)	Wang Juan (CHN)
2022 Hangzhou	Aiperi Medet Kyzy (KGZ)	Zhamila Bakbergenova (KAZ)	Kiran Bishnoi (IND)
2026 Aichi–Nagoya	Yuka Kagami (JPN)	Elmira Syzdykova (KAZ)	Li Wenji (CHN)
2026 Aichi–Nagoya	Yuka Kagami (JPN)	Elmira Syzdykova (KAZ)	Aiperi Medet Kyzy (KGZ)
