= Water polo at the 1976 Summer Olympics – Men's team squads =

The following is the list of squads that took part in the men's water polo tournament at the 1976 Summer Olympics.

== Australia ==
The following players represented Australia:

- Paul Williams
- David Neesham
- Ian Mills
- Peter Montgomery
- Eddie Brooks
- Andrew Kerr
- Ross Langdon
- Charles Turner
- David Woods
- Randall Goff
- Rodney Woods

== Canada ==
The following players represented Canada:

- Guy Leclerc
- Gabor Csepregi
- David Hart
- Paul Pottier
- Gaétan Turcotte
- Clifford Barry
- Jim Ducharme
- Rick Pugliese
- George Gross
- John MacLeod
- Dominique Dion

== Cuba ==
The following players represented Cuba:

- Oscar Periche
- Osvaldo García
- Ramon Peña
- Lazaro Costa
- David Rodríguez
- Nelson Domínguez
- Jorge Rizo
- Eugenio Almenteros
- Jesús Pérez
- Gerardo Rodríguez
- Oriel Domínguez

== Hungary ==
The following players represented Hungary:

- Endre Molnár
- István Szivós Jr.
- Tamás Faragó
- László Sárosi
- Ferenc Konrád
- Tibor Cservenyák
- György Horkai
- Gábor Csapó
- Attila Sudár
- György Kenéz
- György Gerendás

== Iran ==
The following players represented Iran:

- Firouz Abdul Mohammadian
- Jahangir Tavakoli
- Haydar Shonjani
- Ahmed Paidayesh
- Dariush Movahedi
- Bahram Tavakoli
- Reza Kamrani
- Manouchehr Parchami-Araghi
- Hossein Nassim
- Abdul Reza Majdpour
- Ahmed Yaghoti

== Italy ==
The following players represented Italy:

- Alberto Alberani Samaritani
- Roldano Simeoni
- Silvio Baracchini
- Sante Marsili
- Marcello Del Duca
- Gianni De Magistris
- Alessandro Ghibellini
- Luigi Castagnola
- Riccardo De Magistris
- Vincenzo D'Angelo
- Umberto Panerai

== Mexico ==
The following players represented Mexico:

- Daniel Gómez
- Francisco García
- Javier Guerra
- Maximiliano Aguilar
- Arturo Valencia
- Juan Manuel García
- Armando Fernández
- Víctorino Beristain
- Jorge Coste
- Juan Yañez
- Alfred Schmidt

== Netherlands ==
The following players represented the Netherlands:

- Evert Kroon
- Nico Landeweerd
- Jan Evert Veer
- Hans van Zeeland
- Ton Buunk
- Piet de Zwarte
- Hans Smits
- Rik Toonen
- Gijze Stroboer
- Andy Hoepelman

== Romania ==
The following players represented Romania:

- Florin Slăvei
- Cornel Rusu
- Gheorghe Zamfirescu
- Adrian Nastasiu
- Dinu Popescu
- Claudiu Rusu
- Ilie Slăvei
- Liviu Răducanu
- Viorel Rus
- Adrian Schervan
- Doru Spînu

== Soviet Union ==
The following players represented the Soviet Union:

- Anatoly Klebanov
- Sergey Kotenko
- Aleksandr Dreval
- Aleksandr Dolgushin
- Vitaly Romanchuk
- Aleksandr Kabanov
- Oleksiy Barkalov
- Nikolay Melnikov
- Nuzgari Mshvenieradze
- Vladimir Iselidze
- Aleksandr Zakharov

== Yugoslavia ==
The following players represented Yugoslavia:

- Miloš Marković
- Ozren Bonačić
- Uroš Marović
- Predrag Manojlović
- Đuro Savinović
- Damir Polić
- Siniša Belamarić
- Dušan Antunović
- Dejan Dabović
- Boško Lozica
- Zoran Kačić

== West Germany ==
The following players represented West Germany:

- Günter Kilian
- Ludger Weeke
- Hans Simon
- Jürgen Stiefel
- Roland Freund
- Wolfgang Mechler
- Martin Jellinghaus
- Werner Obschernikat
- Horst Kilian
- Peter Röhle
- Günter Wolf
