= Wrestling at the 1974 Asian Games =

- Venue: Aryamehr Indoor Stadium
- Dates: 8–13 September 1974
- Competitors: 113 from 11 nations

Wrestling was one of the events at the 1974 Asian Games held in Aryamehr Indoor Stadium, Tehran, Iran between 8 and 13 September 1974. Iran topped the medal table, in terms of golds (13 out of 21 golds) and the overall medal count (19 out of 60 overall medals).

== Medalists ==
=== Freestyle ===
Event	Gold	Silver	Bronze
48 kg	Akira Kudo; Japan	Sobhan Rouhi; Iran	Ochirdolgoryn Enkhtaivan; Mongolia
52 kg	Ebrahim Javadi; Iran	Yuji Takada; Japan	Satbir Singh; India
57 kg	Mohsen Farahvashi; Iran	Tadashi Sasaki; Japan	Ha Hi-woo; North Korea
62 kg	Yang Jung-mo; South Korea	Zevegiin Oidov; Mongolia	Mohammad Reza Navaei; Iran
68 kg	Yasaburo Sugawara; Japan	Mohammad Khorrami; Iran	Chang Ho-seong; South Korea
74 kg	Mansour Barzegar; Iran	Danzandarjaagiin Sereeter; Mongolia	Mitsuo Degawa; Japan
82 kg	Hamid Alidousti; Iran	Masaru Motegi; Japan	Satpal Singh; India
90 kg	Dashdorjiin Tserentogtokh; Mongolia	Reza Khorrami; Iran	Makoto Kamada; Japan
100 kg	Khorloogiin Bayanmönkh; Mongolia	Reza Soukhtehsaraei; Iran	Sukhchain Singh Cheema; India
+100 kg	Moslem Eskandar-Filabi; Iran	Shared gold	Maroof Khan; Pakistan
+100 kg	Yorihide Isogai; Japan	Shared gold	Maroof Khan; Pakistan

=== Greco-Roman ===
Event	Gold	Silver	Bronze
48 kg	Rahim Aliabadi; Iran	Kazuharu Ishida; Japan	Bang Dae-du; South Korea
52 kg	Koichiro Hirayama; Japan	Baek Seung-hyun; South Korea	Mohammad Aslam; Afghanistan
57 kg	Hossein Touranian; Iran	An Han-young; South Korea	Yoji Sakurama; Japan
62 kg	Akbar Yadollahi; Iran	Teruhiko Miyahara; Japan	Choi Kyung-soo; South Korea
68 kg	Mohammad Dalirian; Iran	Bae Ki-youl; South Korea	Tsedendambyn Natsagdorj; Mongolia
74 kg	Hashem Ghanbari; Iran	Kang Yong-sik; South Korea	Yasuo Nagatomo; Japan
82 kg	Sadao Sato; Japan	Khosro Nezafatdoust; Iran	Dügeriin Tserendash; Mongolia
90 kg	Jalal Karimi; Iran	Yoshihiro Fujita; Japan	Jigjidiin Mönkhbat; Mongolia
100 kg	Bahram Moshtaghi; Iran	Khorloogiin Bayanmönkh; Mongolia	Sukhchain Singh Cheema; India
+100 kg	Moslem Eskandar-Filabi; Iran	Yorihide Isogai; Japan	Doljingiin Adiyaatömör; Mongolia

== Medal table ==
Rank	Nation	Gold	Silver	Bronze	Total
1	Iran (IRN)	13	5	1	19
2	Japan (JPN)	5	7	4	16
3	Mongolia (MGL)	2	3	5	10
4	South Korea (KOR)	1	4	3	8
5	India (IND)	0	0	4	4
6	Afghanistan (AFG)	0	0	1	1
6	North Korea (PRK)	0	0	1	1
6	Pakistan (PAK)	0	0	1	1
Totals (8 entries)		21	19	20	60

== Participating nations ==
A total of 113 athletes from 11 nations competed in wrestling at the 1974 Asian Games:

- Afghanistan (6)
- China (3)
- India (14)
- Iran (19)
- Iraq (12)
- Japan (18)
- Mongolia (10)
- North Korea (5)
- Pakistan (7)
- Philippines (7)
- South Korea (12)
