= Cycling at the 1974 Asian Games =

- Venue: Tehran–Karaj Freeway; Aryamehr Velodrome
- Dates: 5–14 September 1974

Cycling at the 1974 Asian Games was held at the Aryamehr Velodrome in Aryamehr Sport Complex, Tehran, Iran from 5 to 14 September 1974.

== Medalists ==
=== Road ===
Event	Gold	Silver	Bronze
Road race	Hassan Arianfard; Iran	Gholam Hossein Kouhi; Iran	Behrouz Rahbar; Iran
Team time trial	Iran; Hassan Arianfard; Khosro Haghgosha; Gholam Hossein Kouhi; Esmaeil Zeinali	Japan	Mongolia; Sh. Jambal; S. Jamiyan; D. Törtogtokh; Shirnengiin Yondondash

=== Track ===
Event	Gold	Silver	Bronze
Sprint	Shinpei Okajima; Japan	Motomi Shimamoto; Japan	Noh Hae-soo; South Korea
1 km time trial	Shinpei Okajima; Japan	Lee Kwan-sun; South Korea	Zhang Lihua; China
Individual pursuit	Yoichi Machishima; Japan	Kim Sang-soo; South Korea	Khosro Haghgosha; Iran
Team pursuit	Japan	Iran; Hossein Baharloo; Manouchehr Daneshmand; Khosro Haghgosha; Ali Pourmehr	South Korea; Kim Sang-soo; Lee Kwan-sun; Noh Hae-soo; Yang Joon-seng

== Medal table ==
Rank	Nation	Gold	Silver	Bronze	Total
1	Japan (JPN)	4	2	0	6
2	Iran (IRN)	2	2	2	6
3	South Korea (KOR)	0	2	2	4
4	China (CHN)	0	0	1	1
4	Mongolia (MGL)	0	0	1	1
Totals (5 entries)		6	6	6	18
