= Bahram Tavakoli =

Bahram Tavakoli or Tavakkoli may refer to:

- Bahram Tavakkoli (water polo) (born 1953), Iranian water polo player
- Bahram Tavakoli (film director) (born 1976), Iranian film director and screenwriter
