= Makoto Saitō (disambiguation) =

Saitō Makoto (斎藤 実; 1858–1936) was viscount, admiral in the Imperial Japanese Navy, and 30th Prime Minister of Japan.

Makoto Saitō may also refer to:

- Makoto Saitō (designer) (サイトウ マコト; born 1952), Japanese graphic designer
- Makoto Saitō (wrestler) (斎藤 誠; born 1974), also known as K-ness., Japanese professional wrestler
- Makoto Saito (amateur wrestler) (斎藤 真; born 1951), Japanese sport wrestler
- Makoto Saitō (horse trainer) (斎藤 誠; born 1971), Japanese horse trainer
