= Firouzpour =

Firouzpour (Persian: فیروزپور) is an Iranian surname, meaning 'son of Firouz'. Notable people with the surname include:

- Amir Hossein Firouzpour (fl. 2022), Iranian freestyle wrestler
- Mohammad Sadegh Firouzpour (fl. 2021), Iranian freestyle wrestler
- Gholamreza Firouzpour Kamrani (born 1954), Iranian water polo player
