= Water polo at the 1974 Asian Games =

- Venue: Aryamehr Swimming Pool
- Dates: 2–7 September 1974
- Nations: 7

Water polo was contested by men's teams at the 1974 Asian Games in Aryamehr Swimming Pool, Tehran, Iran from September 2 to September 7, 1974.

The host team Iran won the gold medal in the round robin competition by having a better goal difference than China and Japan. The winner also qualified for the 1975 World Championships and the 1976 Summer Olympics.

== Medalists ==
Event	Gold	Silver	Bronze
Men	Iran; Firouz Abdolmohammadian; Reza Kamrani; Abdolreza Majdpour; Dariush Movahedi; Hossein Nasim; Ahmad Peidayesh; Morteza Shariat; Heidar Shonjani; Bahram Tavakkoli; Jahangir Tavakkoli; Ahmad Yaghouti	China; Bao Xianliang; Li Derong; Li Jinkun; Lin Li; Lin Zhiquan; Peng Shaorong; Xiang Liande; Xie Runchen; Xu Lisan; Zhao Yinghua; Zhong Shenggen	Japan

== Results ==
All times are Iran Standard Time (UTC+03:30)

Pos	Team	Pld	W	D	L	GF	GA	GD	Pts
1	Iran	6	4	2	0	79	24	+55	10 (Note: Tied on head-to-head points (2) and goal difference (0). Overall goal difference was used as the tiebreaker.)
2	China	6	4	2	0	67	20	+47	10
3	Japan	6	4	2	0	63	24	+39	10
4	North Korea	6	3	0	3	46	28	+18	6
5	Singapore	6	2	0	4	44	44	0	4
6	India	6	1	0	5	29	72	−43	2
7	Kuwait	6	0	0	6	13	129	−116	0

Source: Results
Notes:

2 September; 11:00	North Korea	7–8	Japan	Aryamehr Swimming Pool, Tehran

2 September; 12:00	Singapore	3–10	China	Aryamehr Swimming Pool, Tehran

2 September; 13:00	Iran	18–6	India	Aryamehr Swimming Pool, Tehran

2 September; 17:30	Singapore	21–1	Kuwait	Aryamehr Swimming Pool, Tehran

2 September; 18:30	Iran	6–6	Japan	Aryamehr Swimming Pool, Tehran

2 September; 19:30	China	17–2	India	Aryamehr Swimming Pool, Tehran

3 September; 11:00	Iran	9–5	North Korea	Aryamehr Swimming Pool, Tehran

3 September; 17:30	India	12–4	Kuwait	Aryamehr Swimming Pool, Tehran

3 September; 18:30	China	4–4	Japan	Aryamehr Swimming Pool, Tehran

4 September; 12:00	India	7–12	Singapore	Aryamehr Swimming Pool, Tehran

4 September; 18:30	China	6–2	North Korea	Aryamehr Swimming Pool, Tehran

4 September; 19:30	Japan	22–1	Kuwait	Aryamehr Swimming Pool, Tehran

5 September; 12:00	China	5–5	Iran	Aryamehr Swimming Pool, Tehran

5 September; 18:30	Japan	9–4	Singapore	Aryamehr Swimming Pool, Tehran

5 September; 19:30	Kuwait	2–17	North Korea	Aryamehr Swimming Pool, Tehran

6 September; 12:00	Japan	14–2	India	Aryamehr Swimming Pool, Tehran

6 September; 18:30	Kuwait	1–32	Iran	Aryamehr Swimming Pool, Tehran

6 September; 19:30	Singapore	3–8	North Korea	Aryamehr Swimming Pool, Tehran

7 September; 12:00	Kuwait	4–25	China	Aryamehr Swimming Pool, Tehran

7 September; 18:30	North Korea	7–0	India	Aryamehr Swimming Pool, Tehran

7 September; 19:30	Singapore	1–9	Iran	Aryamehr Swimming Pool, Tehran

== Final standing ==
Rank	Team	Pld	W	D	L
1st place, gold medalist(s)	Iran	6	4	2	0
2nd place, silver medalist(s)	China	6	4	2	0
3rd place, bronze medalist(s)	Japan	6	4	2	0
4	North Korea	6	3	0	3
5	Singapore	6	2	0	4
6	India	6	1	0	5
7	Kuwait	6	0	0	6
