= Masih Masihnia =

Iranian footballer

Massih Massihnia
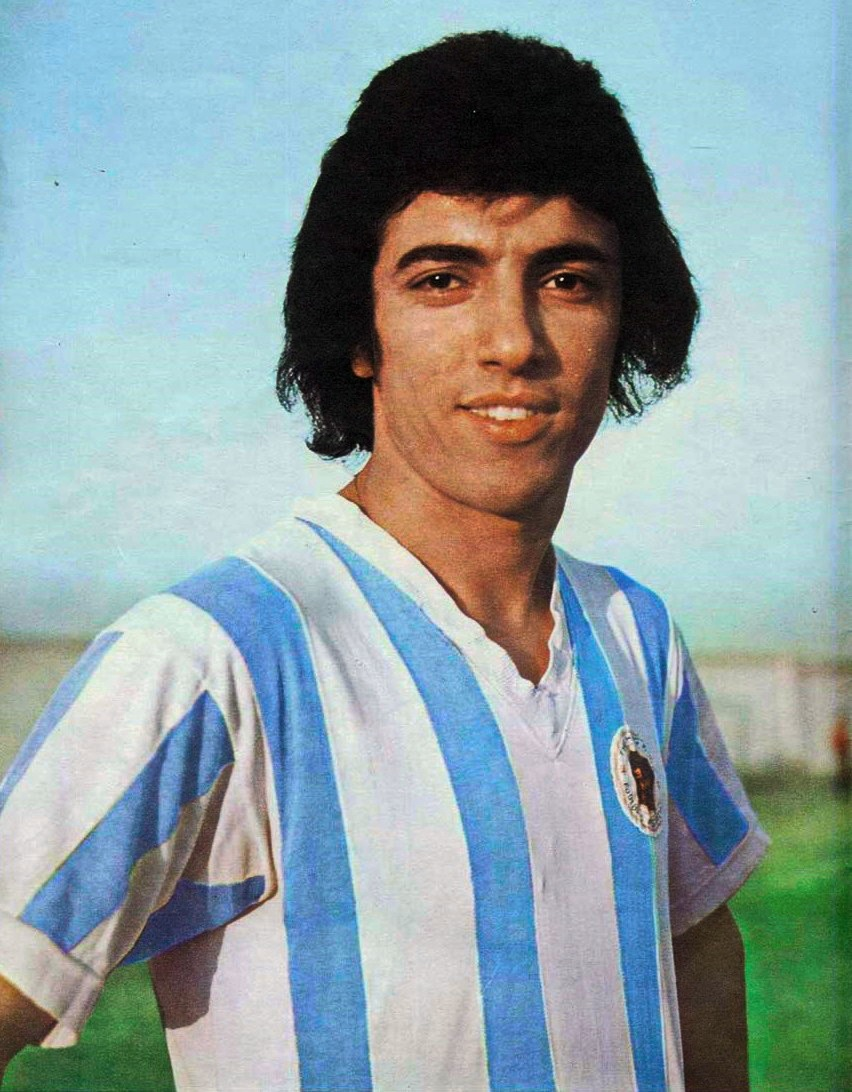

Personal information
- Full name: Massih Massihnia
- Date of birth: 22 January 1955 (age 71)
- Place of birth: Tehran, Iran
- Height: 1.83 m (6 ft 0 in)
- Position: Defender

Senior career*
Years	Team	Apps	(Gls)
1972	Bank Melli F.C.		
1972-1974	Persepolis F.C.		
1975-1976	F.C. Aboumoslem		
1977	Sepahan F.C.		

International career
1974–1975	Iran national football team	8	(0)
Medal record
Men's football
Representing Iran
Asian Games
Gold medal – first place	1974 Tehran	Team
- * Club domestic league appearances and goals

Massih Massihnia (Persian: مسیح مسیح‌نیا), is a retired Iranian footballer.

== Club career ==
Played for Bank Melli F.C., Persepolis F.C., F.C. Aboumoslem, Sepahan F.C.

On December 1969, Masihnia became Persepolis's youngest ever starter in the top league when he was named in the starting XI at 14 years and 321 days old.

== International career ==
He featured for the Iran national football team at 1974 Asian Games, 1974 Iran International Tournament, 1975 Iran International Tournament and qualification for 1976 Olympic Games.

== Honours ==
=== As a player ===
==== International ====
- AFC U-20 Asian Cup:
  - Winner (1): 1973
- Asian Games:
  - Gold Medal (1): 1974
