= Mongolia at the 1974 Asian Games =

- IOC code: MGL
- NOC: Mongolian National Olympic Committee

in Tehran
- Medals Ranked 10th: Gold 2 Silver 5 Bronze 8 Total 15

Asian Games appearances (overview)
- 1974; 1978; 1982; 1986; 1990; 1994; 1998; 2002; 2006; 2010; 2014; 2018; 2022; 2026

Mongolia participated in the 1974 Asian Games held in Tehran, Iran from 1 to 16 September 1974. Athletes from Mongolia won overall 15 medals, including two gold, and finished tenth in a medal table.

== Medal summary ==
=== Medals by sport ===
Sport	Gold	Silver	Bronze	Total
Wrestling	2	2	5	9
Boxing		1	1	2
Shooting			1	
Total				

=== Medalists ===
Medal	Athlete	Sport	Event
Gold	Dashdorjiin Tserentogtokh	Wrestling	Men's freestyle 90 kg
Gold	Khorloogiin Bayanmönkh	Wrestling	Men's freestyle 100 kg
Silver	Zevegiin Oidov	Wrestling	Men's freestyle 62 kg
Silver	Danzandarjaagiin Sereeter	Wrestling	Men's freestyle 74 kg
Silver	Khorloogiin Bayanmönkh	Wrestling	Men's Greco-Roman 100 kg
Silver	Tsedendambyn Natsagdorj	Wrestling	Men's Greco-Roman 68 kg
Silver	Sodnomyn Gombo	Boxing	Men's 60 kg
Bronze	Buyangiin Ganbat	Boxing	Men's 58 kg
Bronze	Ochirdolgoryn Enkhtaivan	Wrestling	Men's freestyle 48 kg
Bronze	Tsedendambyn Natsagdorj	Wrestling	Men's Greco-Roman 68 kg
Bronze	Dügeriin Tserendash	Wrestling	Men's Greco-Roman 82 kg
Bronze	Jigjidiin Mönkhbat	Wrestling	Men's Greco-Roman 90 kg
Bronze	Doljingiin Adyaatömör	Wrestling	Men's Greco-Roman + 100 kg
