= Bahman Nassim =

- Born: Bahman Nassim; February 1940; Abadan, Iran
- Died: January 28, 1980 (aged 39); Evin Prison, Tehran, Iran
- Known for: Water polo, backstroke

Bahman Nassim (February, 1940 – January 28, 1980) was an Iranian record holder for the backstroke, as well as playing for the Iran men's water polo team between the years of 1958–1965. Bahman is known for his influence and early development of competitive swimming and water polo within Iran during the early 1960s, which ultimately led to successful teams in the 1970s. He also served as the Chief of Police for the city of Semnan, Iran, where he was arrested after the overthrow of the Shah, under charges of "Murder of persons and/or killing Muslims or/and freedom fighters". Bahman Nassim was executed by firing squad at dawn on January 28, 1980, at Evin Prison, Tehran, Iran. He is survived by his wife and two daughters, who currently reside in Iran.

== Early life ==
Bahman Nassim was born in February, 1940, in Abadan, Iran, to Ramezan Nassim Naseri and Farideh Hasson. Ramezan Nassim was employed by the National Iranian Oil Company as the head of accounting for the company in Abadan, Iran. Due to the family's high social standing, each of the children within the family enjoyed a comfortable and active life. Sports were a big part of the family's activities, with the sons and daughters involved in swimming, diving, water polo, and basketball. Bahman Nassim was brought onto the Iran national swimming and water polo team in 1958, where he remained until 1965. Hossein Nassim, Bahman's younger brother, was coached, mentored, and trained in swimming and water polo by Bahman himself, leading to many medals and records earned by Hossein.

== Swimming records and awards ==
- Gold medal, backstroke 100m, Iran 1958
- Gold medal, backstroke 100m, Iran 1959
- Silver medal backstroke 100m, Iran 1960
- Silver medal backstroke 100m, Iran 1961
- Silver medal backstroke 100m, Iran 1962
- Silver medal backstroke 100m, Iran 1963

== Post swimming career ==
Bahman Nassim was approached while practicing for swimming competition by a high-ranking official, who asked if he would be interested in pursuing higher education through a police academy. Bahman accepted the offer and became a part of the police force, where he became a high-ranking official. Stationed in Abadan, he was responsible for cracking down on the drug trade that was rampant throughout the port city, gaining a reputation for taking on the worst gangs despite the danger it put him in. He believed staunchly that smoking, drinking and drug use were the cause of many of the problems that existed within the community. Bahman is known to have never drunk alcohol, used drugs, or smoked tobacco.

Bahman was transferred to Semnan, Iran, where he was chief of police within the northern province before the Iranian Revolution. Post-revolution, Bahman refused to relinquish his station and was arrested in 1979. He was charged by the Central Islamic Revolutionary Court with having committed "Murder of persons and/or killing Muslims or/and freedom fighters". Found guilty, he was sentenced to death. At dawn on January 28, 1980, Bahman Nassim was executed at Evin Prison by firing squad. Bahman wore his Iran National Swim team jumper at the time of his execution.
