= Wolfgang Mechler =

German water polo player

Personal information
- Nationality: German
- Born: 21 March 1955 (age 70); Würzburg, West Germany

Sport
- Sport: Water polo

Wolfgang Mechler was born on 21 March 1955 in Würzburg, Bayern (GER). He is a German water polo player, who helped SV Würzburg 05 win five West German national titles (1970, 1974, 1976-78. He also competed in the men's tournament at the 1976 Summer Olympics.
