= Hossein Nassim =

Iranian water polo player

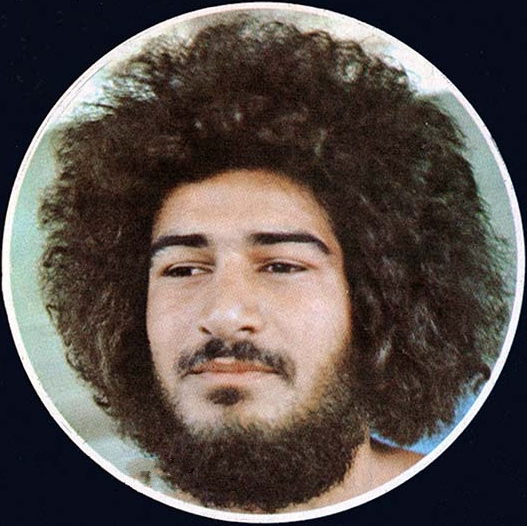

Personal information
- Nationality: Iranian
- Born: Gholam Hossein Nassim; 27 April 1952 (age 74) Abadan, Iran
- Height: 182 cm (6 ft 0 in)
- Weight: 78 kg (172 lb)
- Spouse: Regina Nassim

Sport
- Sport: Water polo, swimming
Medal record
Representing Iran
Asian Games
Gold medal – first place	1974 Tehran	Water polo

Hossein Nassim (born 27 April 1952) is an Iranian swimmer. He who was a member of Iran national water polo teams participating in the 1976 Summer Olympics and 1970, 1974, and 1986 Asian Games, and won a gold medal in 1974. Nassim was known for his national records in the backstroke, and his contribution to the Iran men's national water polo team from the early 1970s through the late 1980s. Nassim immigrated to Germany in 1987, and is now a coach and instructor with swim clubs there.

== Early life ==
Nassim was born in Abadan, Iran, to Ramezan Nassim Naseri and Farideh Hasson. His earliest influences were from his brother Bahman Nassim, whom was himself a water polo player for Iran men's national water polo team, and a record holder for the backstroke from the late 1950s into the early 1960s. Hossein's earliest participation in swimming began with Club Paas in Abadan (for swimming and water polo), then to Jam Club (for swimming, water polo, and basketball), before moving onto the National Men's team of Iran in 1967, at the age of 15. He was known for his strenuous training regimen of doing daily practices with both his swim team and water polo team, twice daily.

== Water polo career ==
Hossein Nassim was known for his speed and strength, earning the nickname 'Shark from the South' from his teammates and competitors, due to his coming from Abadan (which is located in the south of Iran). In joining the national men's team in 1967, he became a starting player for the team in 1970, with his first trip being to Romania for a competition. During the 1974 Asian Games, held in Tehran, Iran, the national team was able to win the gold medal, with the finals being held against China, which ended in a 5–5 tie. Hossein scored three goals in the game, playing from the striker position. It was rumored that post victory over China, that Hossein had climbed the 10m meter diving board and jumped into the pool in celebration, yet it was later discovered that it was a fan by name of Hooshang Parvin that was responsible for the celebratory leap.

In the ensuing years that followed leading up to the Iranian Revolution in 1978 to 1979, the national team was hindered in being unable to host or attend any major competitions. During the early 1980s, government policy limited what sports could be played, with swimming and water polo being nearly eliminated. Iran was absent from Asian game appearances in 1978 and 1982, due to political and social turmoil. At the 1986 Asian Games held in Seoul, South Korea, the Iran men's national water polo team participated and placed 4th, despite close to a decade of not playing within international competitions. Hossein Nassim and Ahmad Yaghouti were the only players to have participated both on the 1974 Asian games team, and the 1986 Asian games squad.

== 1974 Asian Games controversy ==
In the aftermath of the 1974 Asian games, Hossein was subject to a two-year ban from swimming. The ban was given due to an altercation with a high-ranking official that told Hossein to clean up his overgrown beard and long hair so that he could be used for an Army water polo competitions. Hossein explained to the official that he was Darvish (Sufi), at which the official scoffed and insulted his religion. At this point Hossein responded by throwing the official into the swimming pool they were standing next to. Upon being banished from all swimming pools in all of Iran, Hossein moved to southern Iran to take up training in the Shatt al-Arab. Out of sight of officials he trained in the dense and strong currents from September 1974, until March 1975, when the ban was lifted due to the national water polo team moving to join him there for training, along with widespread press coverage of his actions.

== Media appearances ==
In 1974, Hossein was asked to appear on the popular night time show called "Mikhakeh Noghrei", starring Fereydoun Farrokhzad. The show was famous for having performers and entertainers on, but never athletes. Hossein appeared on the show shortly after the Iran men's national water polo team won the 1974 Asian games. On his appearance he sang a very famous song (Stranger on YouTube) by Gharibeh, originally done by Shahrokh.

== Coaching career ==
Post immigration to Germany in 1987, Hossein focused on coaching both swimming and water polo teams at local sports club. In 2000, he was offered the position as head coach for the Iran Men's water polo team, but negotiations were terminated and Hossein returned to Germany. Iran in 2005 offered Hossein the position of head coach for the Iranian Youth Water Polo team, which he led to a gold medal in the Youth Asian Cup, in Thailand that same year. He also served as an assistant coach for Iran Men's Water Polo team in 2005, serving under Neven Kovacevic, who was the head coach.

== Personal life ==
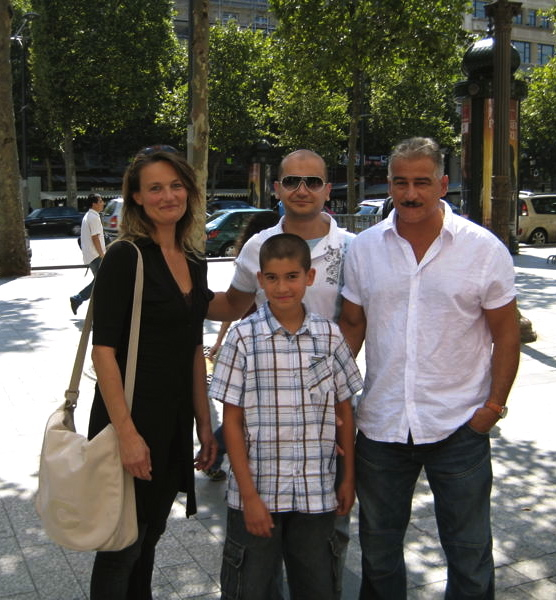
Regina Nassim, Nick Nassim, Bobby Nassim, Hossein Nassim, Summer 2010

Hossein Nassim is married to Regina Nassim, and they have a single son, Nick Nassim. Hossein also has a son, Bobby Nassim, from a previous marriage in the 1980s while living in Iran. Hossein is currently overseeing the training of his son Nick for swimming and water polo competitions in Germany.

== Records ==
- 1967 – 1978 National record holder for 100m backstroke (1:06.09 min) swimming in Iran
- 1967 – 1978 National record holder for 200m backstroke (2:32.00 min) swimming in Iran
- 1979 – 1986 National record holder for 200m backstroke swimming in Iran
- 1970 – 1980 National record holder for 50m front crawl (00:26.50 seconds) swimming in Iran

== Regional swimming competitions ==
- 4th place in 4 x 100 medley relay 1974 Asian Games, Tehran, Iran
- Gold medalist in 100m backstroke, 1976 Omran Cup in İzmir, Turkey (Turkey, Iran, Pakistan, India)
- Gold medalist in 200m backstroke, 1976 Omran Cup in İzmir, Turkey (Turkey, Iran, Pakistan, India)
- Gold medalist in 4 x 100 medley relay, 1976 Omran Cup in İzmir, Turkey (Turkey, Iran, Pakistan, India)

== International water polo accomplishments ==
- 1970 Team Member of Iran men's national water polo team, 1970 Asian Games held in Bangkok, Thailand
- 1974 Team Member of Iran men's national water polo team, 1974 Asian Games held in Iran; Gold medal
- 1975 Team Member of Iran men's national water polo team, 1975 World Aquatics Championships held in Cali, Colombia
- 1975 Team Member of Iran men's national water polo team, African-Asian Cup, defeated Egypt to win the Cup for the competition
- 1976 Team Member of Iran men's national water polo team, participated in the Olympic Games held in Montreal, Canada
- 1986 Captain of Iran men's national water polo team, 1986 Asian Games in Seoul, South Korea; 4 Place finish

== Quotes ==
"I strive to continue the Book (journey) that my brother Bahman started and never finished" Hossein Nassim, September 1974

== See also ==
- Iran at the 1974 Asian Games
- Iran at the 1986 Asian Games
- Iran at the 1976 Summer Olympics
- Water polo at the 1975 World Aquatics Championships – Men's tournament
