= Hassan Arianfard =

Iranian cyclist (born 1948)

Personal information
- Born: 18 October 1948 (age 77)

Cycling career
- Sport: Cycling
Medal record
Representing Iran
Men's Road cycling
Asian Games
Gold medal – first place	1974 Tehran	Road race
Gold medal – first place	1974 Tehran	Team time trial
Silver medal – second place	1970 Bangkok	Team time trial
Men's track cycling
Asian Games
Bronze medal – third place	1970 Bangkok	Team pursuit

Hassan Arianfard (Persian: حسن آریانفرد, born 18 October 1948) also known as Hassan Fard is an Iranian former cyclist. He competed at the 1976 Summer Olympics.
