= Martin Jellinghaus (water polo) =

German water polo player

Personal information
- Nationality: German
- Born: 5 November 1954 Hamm, West Germany
- Died: 13 November 2024 (aged 70)

Sport
- Sport: Water polo

Martin Jellinghaus (5 November 1954 – 13 November 2024) was a German water polo player. He competed in the men's tournament at the 1976 Summer Olympics.
