= Mansour Rashidi =

Iranian footballer

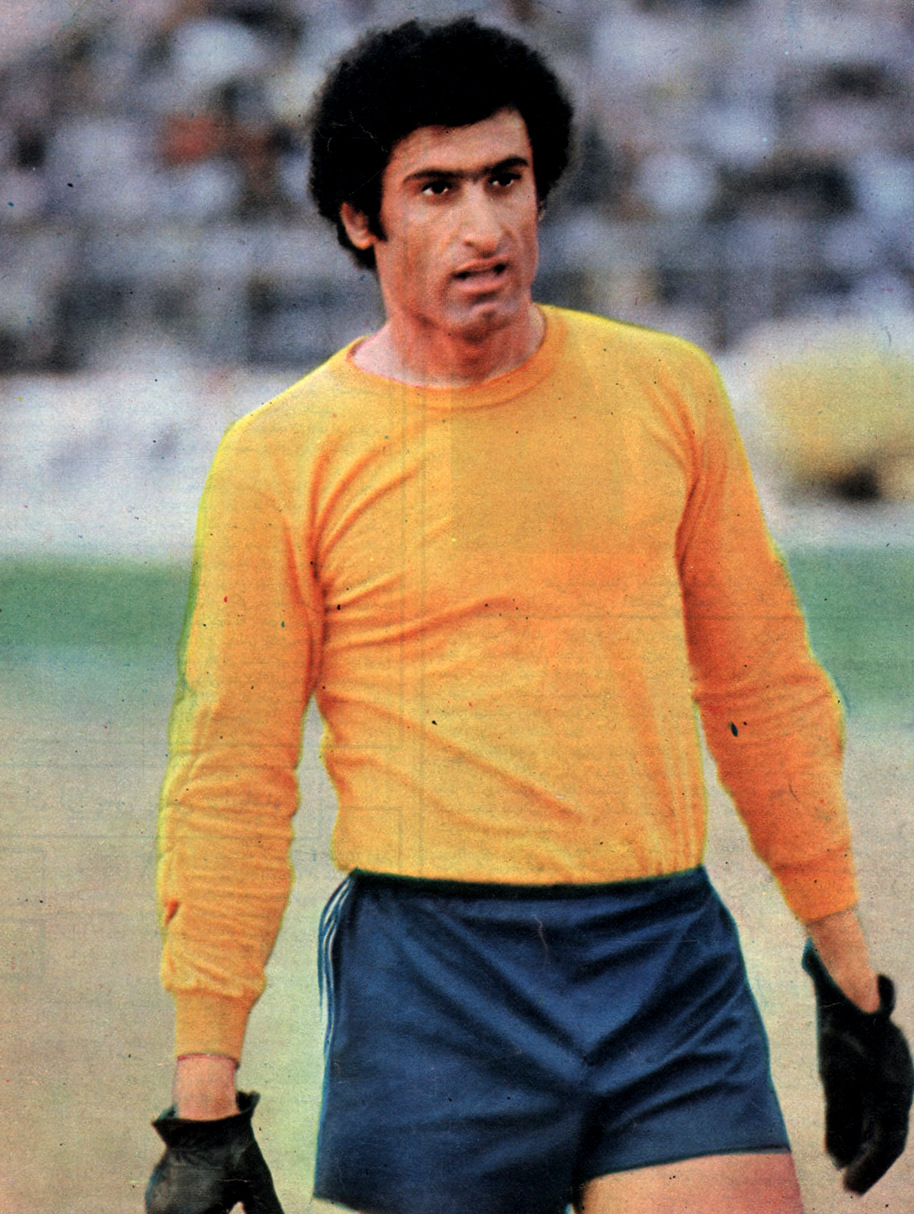

Personal information
- Date of birth: 12 November 1947 (age 78)
- Place of birth: Masjed Soleyman, Iran
- Height: 1.80 m (5 ft 11 in)
- Position: Goalkeeper

Youth career
- Taj Abadan

Senior career*
Years	Team	Apps	(Gls)
- Taj Abadan
- Bargh Tehran
1970	Persepolis		
1970–1971	Deyhim Tehran		
1971–1978	Taj		
1978–1980	Rastakhiz Khorramshahr		
1980–1989	Naft Tehran		

International career
1972–1985	Iran	20	(0)
- * Club domestic league appearances and goals

Mansour Rashidi is a retired Iranian football goalkeeper who played for Iran in the 1976 Asian Cup and 1972 Summer Olympics. He also played for Taj SC.

== Record at Olympic Games ==
National team	Year	Apps	Goals
Iran	1972	3	0

== Honours ==
=== Club ===
Taj

- Takht Jamshid Cup: 1974–75
- Hazfi Cup: 1976–77

=== International ===
Iran

- Asian Cup: 1976
