= Makoto Saito (amateur wrestler) =

Japanese wrestler (born 1951)

Makoto Saito (斎藤 真, Saitō Makoto; born 18 February 1951) is a Japanese former wrestler who competed in the 1972 Summer Olympics.
