= Bahram Moshtaghi =

Iranian wrestler (born 1952)

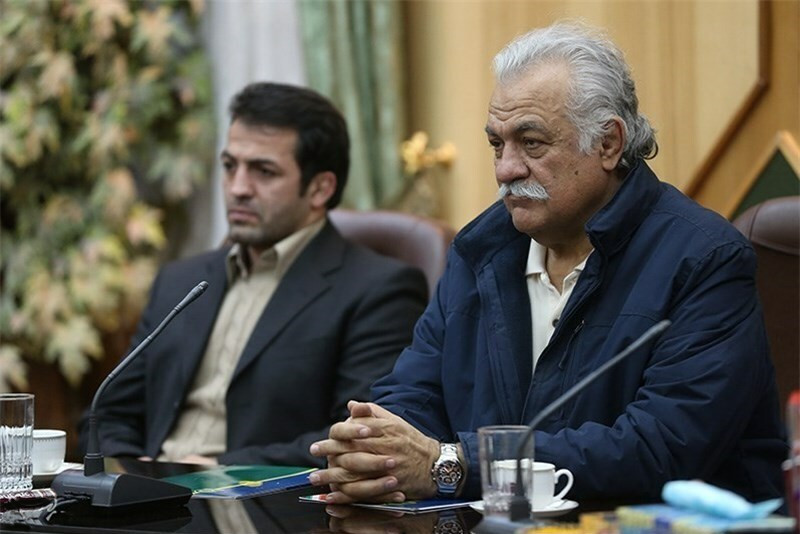
- Moshtaghi in 2016

Personal information
- Nationality: Iranian
- Born: 22 April 1952 (age 74)

Sport
- Sport: Wrestling
Medal record
Representing Iran
Greco-Roman wrestling
Asian Games
Gold medal – first place	1974 Tehran	100 kg

Bahram Moshtaghi (Persian: بهرام مشتاقی, born 22 April 1952) is an Iranian wrestler. He competed in the men's Greco-Roman 100 kg at the 1976 Summer Olympics.
