= Firouz Abdolmohammadian =

Iranian water polo player (born 1942)

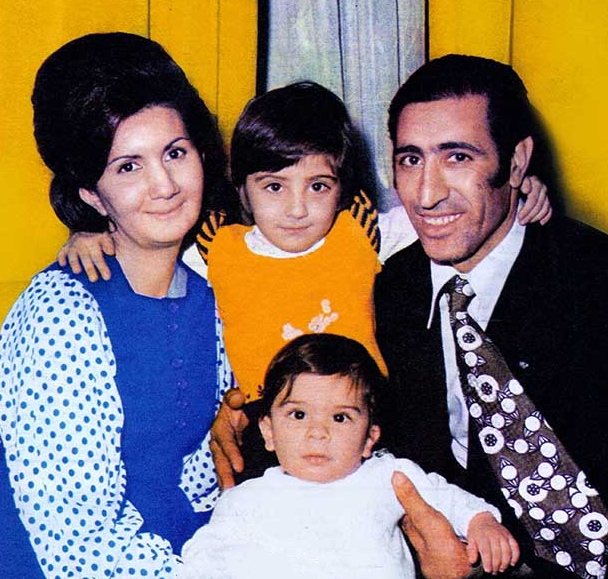
- Abdolmohammadian with Family in 1970s

Personal information
- Born: 27 March 1942 (age 84) Ardabil, Iran
- Height: 178 cm (5 ft 10 in)
- Weight: 74 kg (163 lb)

Sport
- Sport: Water polo
Medal record
Representing Iran
Asian Games
Gold medal – first place	1974 Tehran	Water polo

Firouz Abdolmohammadian (Persian: فیروز عبدالمحمدیان, born 27 March 1942) or Firouz Mohammadi (Persian: فیروز محمدی) is a retired Iranian water polo goalkeeper. He competed at the 1974 Asian Games and 1976 Summer Olympics and won a gold medal in 1974.
