= Reza Khorrami =

Iranian wrestler (born 1946)

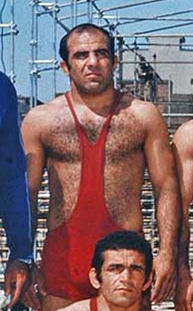
- Reza Khorrami in 1973

Personal information
- Born: January 5, 1946 (age 80)
- Height: 175 cm (5 ft 9 in)

Sport
- Sport: Freestyle wrestling
Medal record
Representing Iran
Asian Games
Silver medal – second place	1974 Tehran	-90 kg

Hossain Reza Khorrami (also Khorami, Persian: حسین رضا خرمی, born January 5, 1946) is a retired Iranian light-heavyweight freestyle wrestler who won a silver medal at the 1974 Asian Games. He placed fourth-fifth at the 1972 Summer Olympics and at the 1971 and 1973 world championships. His brother Mohammad also won a silver medal at the 1974 Asian Games, but in the 68 kg division.
