= Jahangir Tavakkoli =

Iranian water polo player

Personal information
- Nationality: Iranian
- Born: 25 February 1946 (age 80) Tehran, Iran

Sport
- Sport: Water polo
Medal record
Men's water polo
Representing Iran
Asian Games
| Gold medal – first place | 1974 Tehran | Team |

Jahangir "Hossein" Tavakkoli (Persian: جهانگیر توکلی, born 25 February 1946) is an Iranian water polo player. He competed in the men's tournament at the 1976 Summer Olympics.
