= Mohammad Khorrami (wrestler) =

Iranian wrestler

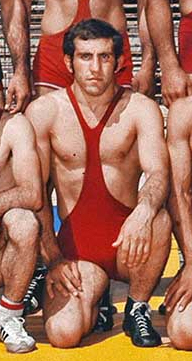
- Mohammad Khorrami in 1973

Sport
- Sport: Freestyle wrestling
Medal record
Representing Iran
Asian Games
| Silver medal – second place | 1974 Tehran | -68 kg |

Mohammad Khorrami (also Khorami, Persian: محمد خرمی) is a retired Iranian freestyle wrestler who won a silver medal at the 1974 Asian Games. His brother Reza Khorrami also won a silver medal at the same competition, but in a 90 kg division.
