= Gholam Hossein Koohi =

Iranian cyclist (born 1951)

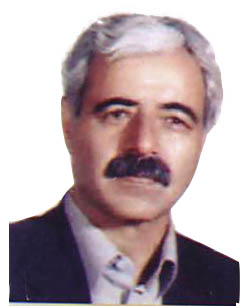

Personal information
- Born: 10 January 1951 (age 75) Mianeh, Iran

Cycling career
- Sport: Cycling

Gholam Hossein Koohi (Persian: غلامحسین کوهی, born 10 January 1951) is an Iranian former cyclist. He competed at the 1972 Summer Olympics and the 1976 Summer Olympics.
