= Ahmad Peidayesh =

Iranian water polo player

Personal information
- Nationality: Iranian
- Born: 4 November 1947 (age 78) Tehran, Iran

Sport
- Sport: Water polo
Medal record
Men's water polo
Representing Iran
Asian Games
Gold medal – first place	1974 Tehran	Team

Ahmad Peidayesh (Persian: احمد پیدایش, born 4 November 1947) is an Iranian water polo player. He competed in the men's tournament at the 1976 Summer Olympics.
