= Dariush Movahedi =

Iranian water polo player (born 1950)

Personal information
- Nationality: Iranian
- Born: 5 January 1950 (age 76) Abadan, Iran

Sport
- Sport: Water polo
Medal record
Men's water polo
Representing Iran
Asian Games
Gold medal – first place	1974 Tehran	Team

Dariush Movahedi (Persian: داریوش موحدی, born 5 January 1950) is an Iranian water polo player. He competed in the men's tournament at the 1976 Summer Olympics.
