= Abdolreza Majdpour =

Iranian water polo player (born 1952)

Personal information
- Nationality: Iranian
- Born: 8 August 1952 (age 73) Tehran, Iran

Sport
- Sport: Water polo
Medal record
Men's water polo
Representing Iran
Asian Games
Gold medal – first place	1974 Tehran	Team

Abdolreza Majdpour (Persian: عبدالرضا مجدپور, born 8 August 1952) is an Iranian water polo player. He competed in the men's tournament at the 1976 Summer Olympics.
