= Mohammad Dalirian =

Iranian wrestler (born 1952)

Personal information
- Nationality: Iranian
- Born: 2 June 1952 (age 74)

Sport
- Sport: Wrestling
Medal record
Representing Iran
Greco-Roman wrestling
Asian Games
Gold medal – first place	1974 Tehran	68 kg

Mohammad Dalirian (Persian: محمد دلیریان, born 2 June 1952) is an Iranian wrestler. He competed in the men's Greco-Roman 68 kg at the 1972 Summer Olympics.
