= Ahmad Yaghouti =

Iranian water polo player

Personal information
- Nationality: Iranian
- Born: 2 September 1951 (age 74)

Sport
- Sport: Water polo
Medal record
Men's water polo
Representing Iran
Asian Games
Gold medal – first place	1974 Tehran	Team

Ahmad Yaghouti (Persian: احمد یاقوتی; born 2 September 1951) is an Iranian water polo player. He competed in the men's tournament at the 1976 Summer Olympics.
