= Khosro Nezafatdoust =

Iranian wrestler

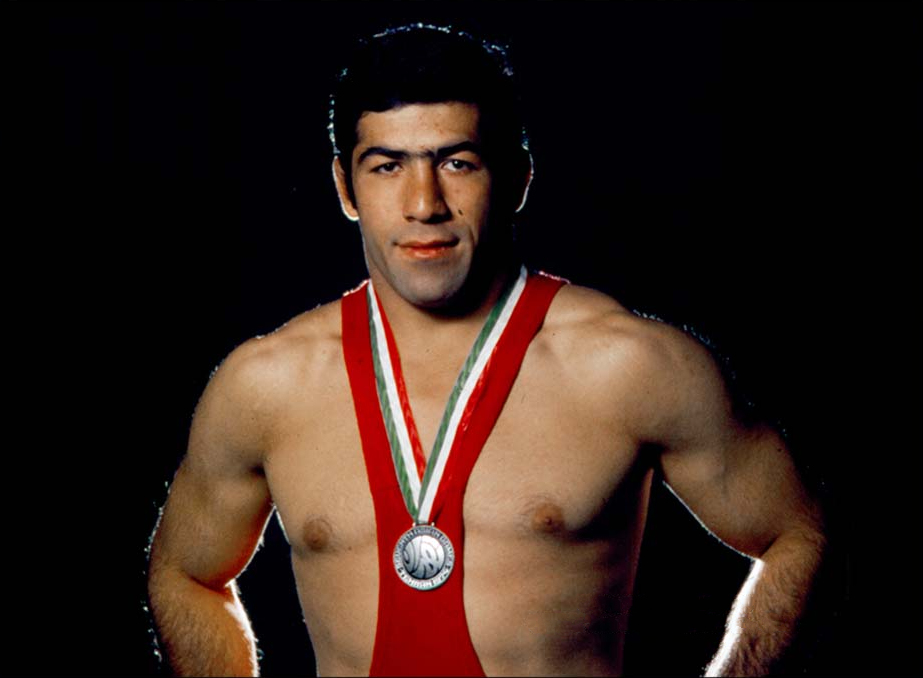
- Nezafatdoust in 1974

Personal information
- Nationality: Iranian

Sport
- Sport: Wrestling
Medal record
Representing Iran
Greco-Roman wrestling
Asian Games
Silver medal – second place	1974 Tehran	82 kg

Khosro Nezafatdoust (Persian: خسرو نظافت‌دوست) is an Iranian wrestler. He competed at the 1974 Asian Games and won a silver medal.
