= Heidar Shonjani =

Iranian swimmer and water polo player (1945–2020)

Heidar Shonjani حیدر شونجانی
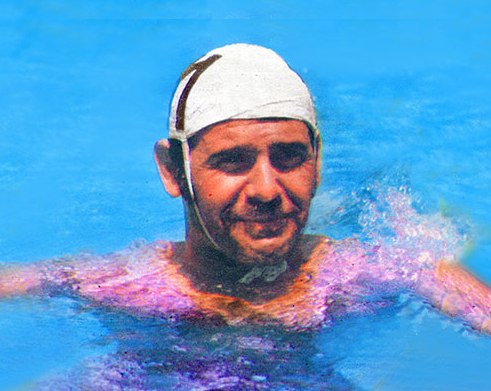
- Shonjani in 1970s

Personal information
- Born: 16 December 1945 Bandar-e Anzali, Iran
- Died: 8 November 2020 (aged 74)
- Height: 1.73 m (5 ft 8 in)
- Weight: 70 kg (150 lb)

Sport
- Sport: Water polo, swimming
Medal record
Representing Iran
Asian Games
Gold medal – first place	1974 Tehran	Water polo

Heidar Shonjani (Persian: حیدر شونجانی, 16 December 1945 – 8 November 2020), was an Iranian swimmer and water polo player.

== Career ==
His first international tournament was the 1964 Summer Olympics, where he became the first Iranian swimmer to participate in the Summer Olympics; he swam 100 m freestyle, but failed to reach the final. Shonjani was a member of Iran national water polo teams that won a gold medal at the 1974 Asian Games and competed in the 1976 Summer Olympics, finishing 12th.
