= Doljingiin Adiyaatömör =

Mongolian wrestler (born 1945)

Doljingiin Adyaatömör (Mongolian: Должингийн Адъяатөмөр; born March 10, 1945) is a Mongolian wrestler.

Adyaatömör participated in the 1976 Summer Olympics in Montreal. He lost both his matches in super-heavyweight against Ladislau Simon in first and Moslem Eskandar-Filabi in third round. (In second round he had a bye). He finished as one of three ninth placed.
