= Reza Kamrani =

Iranian water polo player (born 1954)

Personal information
- Full name: Gholamreza Firouzpour Kamrani
- Nationality: Iranian
- Born: 23 August 1954 (age 71) Tehran, Iran

Sport
- Sport: Water polo
Medal record
Men's water polo
Representing Iran
Asian Games
Gold medal – first place	1974 Tehran	Team

Gholamreza Firouzpour Kamrani (Persian: غلامرضا فیروزپور کامرانی, born 23 August 1954) more known as Reza Kamrani is an Iranian water polo player. He competed in the men's tournament at the 1976 Summer Olympics.
