= Moslem Eskandar-Filabi =

Iranian wrestler (born 1944)

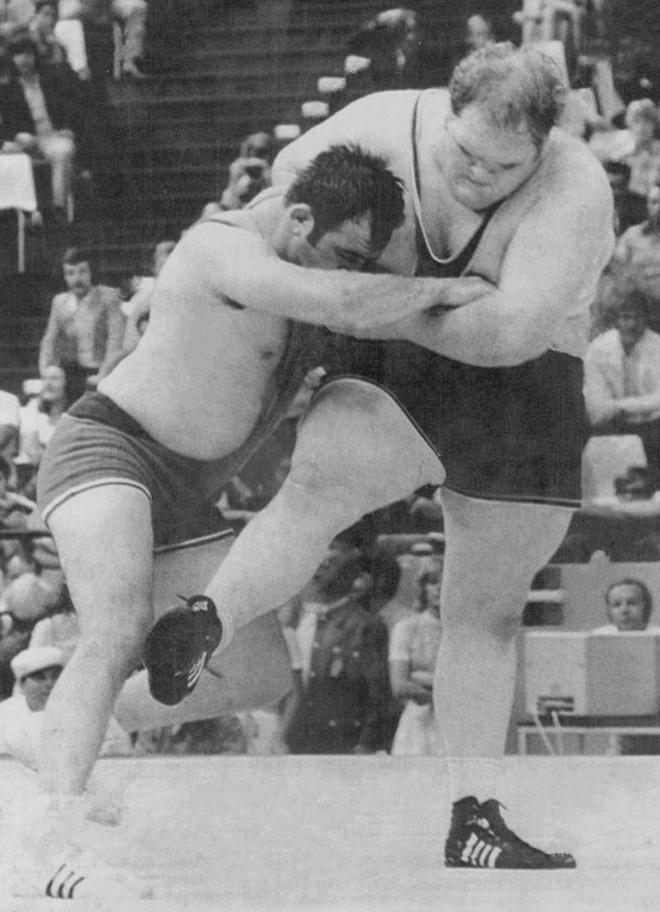
- Filabi (left) vs. Chris Taylor at the 1972 Olympics

Personal information
- Born: 26 March 1944 (age 82) Filab, Iran
- Height: 190 cm (6 ft 3 in)

Sport
- Sport: Wrestling
Medal record
Freestyle wrestling
Representing Iran
Asian Games
Gold medal – first place	1966 Bangkok	+97 kg
Gold medal – first place	1970 Bangkok	+100 kg
Gold medal – first place	1974 Tehran	+100 kg
Greco-Roman wrestling
Asian Games
Gold medal – first place	1974 Tehran	+100 kg

Moslem Eskandar-Filabi (Persian: مسلم اسكندر فيلابی, born 26 March 1944) or Eskandar Filabi is a retired Iranian heavyweight wrestler who won four gold medals at the Asian Games in 1966-1974. Filabi also competed at the 1968, 1972 and 1976 Summer Olympics with the best result of fourth place in 1972; he served as the flag carrier for Iran at the 1976 Games. He is also the chair of the sports commission of the National Council of Resistance of Iran and a supporter of the People's Mojahedin Organization of Iran.

Olympic Games
Preceded by Abdollah Movahed	Flagbearer for Iran; Munich 1972; Montreal 1976	Succeeded by Hassan Zahedi
