= Ochirdolgoryn Enkhtaivan =

Mongolian wrestler (born 1952)

Personal information
- Nationality: Mongolian
- Born: 28 February 1952
- Died: 24 August 2022 (aged 70)

Sport
- Country: Mongolian
- Sport: Wrestling
- Event: Freestyle
Medal record
Men's freestyle wrestling
Representing Mongolia
World Wrestling Championships
Bronze medal – third place	1973 Tehran	48 kg
Asian Games
Bronze medal – third place	1974 Tehran	48 kg
World University Games
Bronze medal – third place	1977 Sofia	48 kg

Ochirdolgoryn Enkhtaivan (28 February 1952 – 24 August 2022) was a Mongolian wrestler. He competed in the men's Greco-Roman 48 kg at the 1972 Summer Olympics.
