= Yorihide Isogai =

Japanese wrestler (born 1950)

Yorihide Isogai (磯貝 頼秀, Isogai Yorihide; born 19 August 1950) is a Japanese former wrestler who competed in the 1968 Summer Olympics, in the 1972 Summer Olympics, and in the 1976 Summer Olympics.
