= Makoto Kamada =

Japanese wrestler (born 1950)

Makoto Kamada (鎌田 誠, Kamada Makoto; born 21 October 1950) is a Japanese former wrestler who competed in the 1972 Summer Olympics.
