= Bahram Tavakkoli (water polo) =

Iranian water polo player

Personal information
- Nationality: Iranian
- Born: 8 November 1953 (age 72) Tehran, Iran

Sport
- Sport: Water polo
Medal record
Men's water polo
Representing Iran
Asian Games
Gold medal – first place	1974 Tehran	Team

Bahram Tavakkoli (Persian: بهرام توکلی, born 8 November 1953) is an Iranian water polo player. He competed in the men's tournament at the 1976 Summer Olympics.
