= Afghanistan at the 1974 Asian Games =

- IOC code: AFG
- NOC: Afghanistan National Olympic Committee

in Tehran
- Medals Ranked 19th: Gold 0 Silver 0 Bronze 1 Total 1

Asian Games appearances (overview)
- 1951; 1954; 1958; 1962; 1966; 1970; 1974; 1978; 1982; 1986; 1990; 1994; 1998; 2002; 2006; 2010; 2014; 2018; 2022; 2026

Afghanistan participated in the 1974 Asian Games held in Tehran, Iran from 1 to 16 September 1974. Athletes from Afghanistan won only one medal, a bronze, and finished 19th in the medal table.
