= Tsedendambyn Natsagdorj =

Mongolian wrestler (1944–2017)

Personal information
- Nationality: Mongolian
- Born: 20 February 1944 Bayankhongor, Mongolia
- Died: 3 May 2017 (aged 73)

Sport
- Country: Mongolia
- Sport: Freestyle Wrestling
- Weight class: 68 kg
Medal record
Representing Mongolia
Men's Freestyle wrestling
World Championships
Silver medal – second place	1975 Minsk	68 kg
Bronze medal – third place	1974 Istanbul	68 kg
World Cup
Silver medal – second place	1975 Toledo	68 kg
World University Games
Gold medal – first place	1973 Moscow	68 kg
Men's Greco-Roman wrestling
Asian Games
Bronze medal – third place	1974 Tehran	68 kg

Tsedendambyn Natsagdorj (20 February 1944 – 3 May 2017) was a Mongolian wrestler. He competed at the 1968 Summer Olympics, the 1972 Summer Olympics and the 1976 Summer Olympics.
