= List of Iranian medalists in international freestyle wrestling =

This list includes Iranian freestyle wrestling medalists in regional, continental and world competitions organized by the United World Wrestling (UWW).

== Olympics ==
Year	Venue	Medalists		
Year	Venue	Gold	Silver	Bronze
1904–1936		Did not participate		
1948	London	—	—	—
1952	Helsinki	—	Nasser Givehchi; Gholamreza Takhti	Mahmoud Mollaghasemi; Tofigh Jahanbakht; Abdollah Mojtabavi
1956	Melbourne	Emam-Ali Habibi; Gholamreza Takhti	Mohammad Ali Khojastehpour; Mehdi Yaghoubi	—
1960	Rome	—	Gholamreza Takhti	Ebrahim Seifpour
1964	Tokyo	—	—	Ali Akbar Heidari; Mohammad Ali Sanatkaran
1968	Mexico City	Abdollah Movahed	—	Aboutaleb Talebi; Shamseddin Seyed-Abbasi
1972	Munich	—	—	Ebrahim Javadi
1976	Montreal	—	Mansour Barzegar	—
1980–1984		Did not participate		
1988	Seoul	—	Askari Mohammadian	—
1992	Barcelona	—	Askari Mohammadian	Amir Reza Khadem; Rasoul Khadem
1996	Atlanta	Rasoul Khadem	Abbas Jadidi	Amir Reza Khadem
2000	Sydney	Alireza Dabir	—	—
2004	Athens	—	Masoud Mostafa-Jokar; Alireza Rezaei	Alireza Heidari
2008	Beijing	—	—	Morad Mohammadi
2012	London	Komeil Ghasemi	Sadegh Goudarzi	Ehsan Lashgari
2016	Rio de Janeiro	Hassan Yazdani	Komeil Ghasemi	Hassan Rahimi
2020	Tokyo	—	Hassan Yazdani	Amir Hossein Zare
2024	Paris	—	Rahman Amouzad; Hassan Yazdani; Amir Hossein Zare	Amir Ali Azarpira

== World Championship ==
Year	Venue	Medalists			Team rank
Year	Venue	Gold	Silver	Bronze	Team rank
1951	Helsinki	—	Mahmoud Mollaghasemi; Gholamreza Takhti	Mehdi Yaghoubi; Abdollah Mojtabavi	4th
1954	Tokyo	Tofigh Jahanbakht; Abbas Zandi	Mohammad Ali Fardin	—	3rd
1957	Istanbul	Nabi Sorouri	Hossein Mollaghasemi	—	3rd
1959	Tehran	Emam-Ali Habibi; Gholamreza Takhti	—	—	4th
1961	Yokohama	Ebrahim Seifpour; Mohammad Ali Sanatkaran; Emam-Ali Habibi; Mansour Mehdizadeh; Gholamreza Takhti	Nasrollah Soltaninejad	Hamid Tavakkol	1st
1962	Toledo	Emam-Ali Habibi; Mansour Mehdizadeh	Mohammad Khadem; Gholamreza Takhti	—	3rd
1963	Sofia	—	Ebrahim Seifpour	Mansour Mehdizadeh	5th
1965	Manchester	Ebrahim Seifpour; Abdollah Movahed; Mansour Mehdizadeh	Mohammad Ali Farrokhian; Mohammad Ali Sanatkaran	—	1st
1966	Toledo	Abdollah Movahed	—	Aboutaleb Talebi; Hossein Tahami; Abolfazl Anvari	4th
1967	New Delhi	Abdollah Movahed	—	Aboutaleb Talebi	3rd
1969	Mar del Plata	Ebrahim Javadi; Abdollah Movahed	Mohammad Ghorbani; Shamseddin Seyed-Abbasi	Aboutaleb Talebi; Abolfazl Anvari	3rd
1970	Edmonton	Ebrahim Javadi; Shamseddin Seyed-Abbasi; Abdollah Movahed	Mohammad Farhangdoust	Mohammad Ghorbani	3rd
1971	Sofia	Ebrahim Javadi; Mohammad Ghorbani	Shamseddin Seyed-Abbasi; Mohammad Farhangdoust	—	2nd
1973	Tehran	Ebrahim Javadi; Mohsen Farahvashi; Mansour Barzegar	—	Mohammad Reza Navaei	2nd
1974	Istanbul	—	Ramezan Kheder	—	7th
1975	Minsk	—	Mansour Barzegar	—	8th
1977	Lausanne	—	Mansour Barzegar	—	6th
1978	Mexico City	—	Mohammad Hossein Mohebbi; Reza Soukhtehsaraei	Mohammad Bazmavar; Mohammad Rezaei	3rd
1979		Did not participate			
1981	Skopje	—	Reza Soukhtehsaraei	—	5th
1982	Edmonton	—	—	—	6th
1983		Did not participate			
1985	Budapest	—	Majid Torkan	—	13th
1986–1987		Did not participate			
1989	Martigny	Alireza Soleimani	Askari Mohammadian	Majid Torkan	5th
1990	Tokyo	Majid Torkan	—	Amir Reza Khadem; Mohammad Hassan Mohebbi	4th
1991	Varna	Amir Reza Khadem	—	Oveis Mallah	3rd
1993	Toronto	Akbar Fallah	Gholamreza Mohammadi	—	7th
1994	Istanbul	Rasoul Khadem	Mohammad Talaei	Gholamreza Mohammadi; Behrouz Yari	4th
1995	Atlanta	Rasoul Khadem	Gholamreza Mohammadi; Akbar Fallah	Abbas Jadidi	2nd
1997	Krasnoyarsk	Mohammad Talaei; Abbas Hajkenari	—	Alireza Heidari	3rd
1998	Tehran	Alireza Dabir; Alireza Heidari; Abbas Jadidi	Abbas Hajkenari; Rasoul Khadem	Gholamreza Mohammadi	1st
1999	Ankara	—	Alireza Dabir; Alireza Heidari	Abbas Jadidi	4th
2001	Sofia	—	Babak Nourzad; Alireza Dabir; Amir Tavakkolian	—	3rd
2002	Tehran	Mehdi Hajizadeh	Alireza Dabir; Alireza Heidari	Mohammad Talaei; Majid Khodaei	1st
2003	New York City	—	Alireza Heidari	Alireza Rezaei	3rd
2005	Budapest	—	—	Morad Mohammadi	6th
2006	Guangzhou	Morad Mohammadi	Ali Asghar Bazri	Reza Yazdani; Fardin Masoumi	2nd
2007	Baku	—	Saeid Ebrahimi	Reza Yazdani	7th
2009	Herning	Mehdi Taghavi	Fardin Masoumi	Sadegh Goudarzi	3rd
2010	Moscow	—	Sadegh Goudarzi	Morad Mohammadi	4th
2011	Istanbul	Mehdi Taghavi; Reza Yazdani	Sadegh Goudarzi	Hassan Rahimi	2nd
2013	Budapest	Hassan Rahimi; Reza Yazdani	Ezzatollah Akbari	Masoud Esmaeilpour; Ehsan Lashgari	1st
2014	Tashkent	—	Masoud Esmaeilpour; Ahmad Mohammadi; Komeil Ghasemi	Hassan Rahimi; Mohammad Hossein Mohammadian	2nd
2015	Las Vegas	—	Hassan Rahimi; Hassan Yazdani	Ahmad Mohammadi; Alireza Karimi	1st
2016	Budapest	—	—	Mostafa Hosseinkhani	N/A
2017	Paris	Hassan Yazdani	—	—	9th
2018	Budapest	—	—	Hassan Yazdani; Alireza Karimi; Parviz Hadi	6th
2019	Nur-Sultan	Hassan Yazdani	Alireza Karimi	Behnam Ehsanpour; Younes Emami	3rd
2021	Oslo	Hassan Yazdani; Kamran Ghasempour; Amir Hossein Zare	Alireza Sarlak; Amir Mohammad Yazdani; Mohammad Nokhodi	Mojtaba Goleij	3rd
2022	Belgrade	Rahman Amouzad; Kamran Ghasempour	Reza Atri; Mohammad Nokhodi; Hassan Yazdani	Younes Emami; Amir Hossein Zare	2nd
2023	Belgrade	Amir Hossein Zare	Amir Mohammad Yazdani; Hassan Yazdani	Mohammad Nokhodi	2nd
2024	Tirana	—	Mohammad Nokhodi	—	2nd
2025	Zagreb	Rahman Amouzad; Amir Hossein Zare	Ahmad Javan; Amir Ali Azarpira	Mohammad Nokhodi; Kamran Ghasempour; Amir Hossein Firouzpour	1st
2026	Astana	Ahmad Javan; Amir Hossein Zare	Mohammad Nokhodi	Rahman Amouzad; Amir Mohammad Yazdani; Hassan Yazdani	3rd

== Asian Games ==
Year	Venue	Medalists		
Year	Venue	Gold	Silver	Bronze
1954		Did not participate		
1958	Tokyo	Emam-Ali Habibi; Gholamreza Takhti; Abbas Zandi	Khalil Rayatpanah; Tofigh Jahanbakht; Nabi Sorouri	Gholam Hossein Zandi; Nasser Givehchi
1962		Did not participate		
1966	Bangkok	Abdollah Movahed; Mansour Mehdizadeh; Moslem Eskandar-Filabi	Ali Akbar Heidari; Mohammad Ali Farrokhian; Ebrahim Seifpour; Hossein Tahami; Mahmoud Moezzipour	—
1970	Bangkok	Ebrahim Javadi; Mohammad Ghorbani; Shamseddin Seyed-Abbasi; Abdollah Movahed; Dariush Zakeri; Moslem Eskandar-Filabi	Mohammad Farhangdoust; Ali Hajiloo	Abolfazl Anvari
1974	Tehran	Ebrahim Javadi; Mohsen Farahvashi; Mansour Barzegar; Hamid Alidousti; Moslem Eskandar-Filabi	Sobhan Rouhi; Mohammad Khorrami; Reza Khorrami; Reza Soukhtehsaraei	Mohammad Reza Navaei
1978		Did not participate		
1982	New Delhi	Mohammad Hossein Mohebbi; Mohammad Hassan Mohebbi; Reza Soukhtehsaraei	Mohammad Hossein Dabbaghi; Askari Mohammadian	Ahmad Rezaei; Mahmoud Moradi Ganji
1986	Seoul	Majid Torkan; Askari Mohammadian; Alireza Soleimani	Yaghoub Najafi; Allahmorad Zarini; Mohammad Hassan Mohebbi	Akbar Fallah; Ali Akbarnejad; Mohammad Hossein Mohebbi; Kazem Gholami
1990	Beijing	Oveis Mallah; Behrouz Yari; Reza Soukhtehsaraei	Rasoul Khadem; Ayat Vagozari	Jalil Jahanshahi; Ayoub Baninosrat
1994	Hiroshima	Nader Rahmati; Ali Akbarnejad; Behrouz Yari; Amir Reza Khadem; Rasoul Khadem; Ebrahim Mehraban	Ayoub Baninosrat	Oveis Mallah; Reza Safaei
1998	Bangkok	Amir Tavakkolian; Alireza Heidari; Abbas Jadidi; Alireza Rezaei	Behnam Tayyebi	Mohammad Talaei
2002	Busan	Alireza Heidari	Alireza Dabir; Abbas Jadidi	Mohammad Rezaei; Mehdi Hajizadeh
2006	Doha	Morad Mohammadi; Ali Asghar Bazri; Reza Yazdani; Alireza Heidari	Fardin Masoumi	—
2010	Guangzhou	Sadegh Goudarzi; Jamal Mirzaei; Reza Yazdani	Mehdi Taghavi	Fardin Masoumi
2014	Incheon	Masoud Esmaeilpour; Meisam Mostafa-Jokar; Reza Yazdani; Parviz Hadi	Ezzatollah Akbari	—
2018	Jakarta	Hassan Yazdani; Alireza Karimi; Parviz Hadi	—	Reza Atri
2022	Hangzhou	Younes Emami; Hassan Yazdani; Amir Hossein Zare	Rahman Amouzad; Mojtaba Goleij	—
2026	Nagoya	Younes Emami; Mohammad Nokhodi; Amir Ali Azarpira; Amir Hossein Zare	—	—

== Asian Championships ==
Year	Venue	Medalists			Team rank
Year	Venue	Gold	Silver	Bronze	Team rank
1979	Jalandhar	Mohammad Hossein Mohebbi; Jabbar Mahdioun; Mohammad Hassan Mohebbi; Reza Soukhtehsaraei	Rasoul Hosseini; Ali Abdoli	Sobhan Rouhi; Jahandar Abdolbagher; Alireza Soleimani	1st
1981	Lahore	Yaghoub Najafi; Rasoul Hosseini; Ahmad Rezaei; Hassan Hamidi; Mohammad Hossein Mohebbi; Mohammad Hassan Mohebbi; Hashem Kolahi; Alireza Soleimani	Jabbar Mahdioun	Mohammad Bazmavar	1st
1983	Tehran	Majid Torkan; Yaghoub Najafi; Askari Mohammadian; Khosro Pishro; Aziz Vagozari; Mohammad Hossein Mohebbi; Mohammad Hassan Mohebbi; Alireza Soleimani	Mohsen Kaveh; Hossein Golabi	—	1st
1987	Mumbai	Ayat Vagozari; Mohammad Hossein Mohebbi; Mohammad Hassan Mohebbi; Alireza Soleimani	—	Yaghoub Najafi; Mohammad Zolfaghari; Hamid Ghafourian; Mehdi Mohebbi	1st
1988	Islamabad	Ali Akbarnejad; Behrouz Yari; Allahmorad Zarini; Mohammad Reza Toupchi; Mehdi Mohebbi; Alireza Lorestani	Akbar Fallah	Nader Rahmati; Ali Akbar Dodangeh; Jalil Jahanshahi	1st
1989	Oarai	Majid Torkan; Behrouz Yari; Mohammad Hassan Mohebbi; Mohammad Reza Toupchi; Alireza Soleimani	Askari Mohammadian	Taghi Akbarnejad; Mohammad Hossein Mohebbi	1st
1991	New Delhi	Nasser Zeinalnia; Majid Torkan; Taghi Akbarnejad; Ali Akbarnejad; Rasoul Khadem; Mohammad Reza Toupchi; Alireza Soleimani	Amir Reza Khadem	Ardeshir Bolandeghbal	1st
1992	Tehran	Amir Reza Khadem; Rasoul Khadem; Kazem Gholami; Alireza Lorestani	Majid Torkan; Oveis Mallah; Mohammad Zolfaghari; Akbar Fallah; Abbas Jadidi	—	1st
1993	Ulaanbaatar	Behrouz Yari; Amir Reza Khadem; Rasoul Khadem; Abbas Jadidi; Ayoub Baninosrat	Oveis Mallah; Ali Akbarnejad	Nasser Zeinalnia; Alireza Rezaeimanesh	1st
1995	Manila	Amir Tavakkolian; Issa Momeni; Rasoul Khadem; Mansour Abedian	Oveis Mallah	Hossein Karimi; Ayoub Baninosrat	1st
1996	Xiaoshan	Rasoul Khadem; Abbas Jadidi; Ebrahim Mehraban	—	Behnam Tayyebi; Mohammad Talaei; Abbas Hajkenari; Amir Tavakkolian; Issa Momeni; Alireza Heidari	1st
1997	Tehran	Abbas Hajkenari; Davoud Ghanbari; Alireza Heidari; Abdolreza Kargar; Ebrahim Mehraban	—	Gholamreza Mohammadi; Mohammad Talaei	1st
1999	Tashkent	Ali Akbar Dodangeh; Alireza Heidari; Alireza Rezaei	—	—	2nd
2000	Guilin	—	Mohammad Aslani; Mehdi Baraati	Masoud Jamshidi; Mohammad Javad Rasekhi; Alireza Rezaei	2nd
2001	Ulaanbaatar	Behnam Tayyebi; Amir Tavakkolian; Mehdi Hajizadeh; Pejman Dorostkar; Alireza Heidari	Alireza Rezaei	Mohammad Aslani; Ali Babaei-Jafari	1st
2003	New Delhi	Mohammad Aslani; Morad Mohammadi; Hassan Tahmasebi; Pejman Dorostkar; Alireza Heidari; Alireza Rezaei	Reza Ramezanzadeh	—	1st
2004	Tehran	Mehdi Sadeghnejad; Fereydoun Ghanbari; Fardin Masoumi	Morad Mohammadi; Hassan Tahmasebi	Hossein Khaleghifar	1st
2005	Wuhan	Morad Mohammadi; Saeid Ebrahimi; Hamid Seifi	Hamid Mohammadnejad; Alireza Rezaei	Taghi Dadashi; Hadi Habibi	1st
2006	Almaty	Mohammad Rezaei; Hadi Habibi	Morad Mohammadi	Majid Khodaei; Hamid Seifi; Hadi Pouralijan	1st
2007	Bishkek	Hassan Tahmasebi; Mehdi Mansouri; Fardin Masoumi	Meisam Mostafa-Jokar; Amir Abbas Moradi Ganji	Abbas Dabbaghi; Mehdi Taghavi	1st
2008	Jeju City	Fardin Masoumi	Meisam Mostafa-Jokar; Amir Abbas Moradi Ganji	Morad Mohammadi	2nd
2009	Pattaya	Mehdi Taghavi; Sadegh Goudarzi; Ehsan Lashgari; Saeid Ebrahimi; Fardin Masoumi	—	Hassan Rahimi; Masoud Esmaeilpour	1st
2010	New Delhi	Masoud Esmaeilpour; Ehsan Lashgari; Reza Yazdani	Saeid Riahi	Mohammad Reza Azarshakib	1st
2011	Tashkent	Ehsan Amini	Mostafa Aghajani; Erfan Amiri; Komeil Ghasemi	—	2nd
2012	Gumi	Hassan Rahimi; Mehdi Taghavi; Sadegh Goudarzi; Ehsan Lashgari; Parviz Hadi	Masoud Esmaeilpour	Erfan Amiri	1st
2013	New Delhi	Parviz Hadi	—	Ezzatollah Akbari; Ehsan Amini; Hamed Tatari	2nd
2014	Astana	Masoud Esmaeilpour; Ahmad Mohammadi; Mostafa Hosseinkhani; Reza Afzali; Meisam Mostafa-Jokar; Komeil Ghasemi	—	—	1st
2015	Doha	Masoud Esmaeilpour; Peyman Yarahmadi; Alireza Karimi; Mohammad Hossein Mohammadian	Behnam Ehsanpour; Komeil Ghasemi	Younes Sarmasti	1st
2016	Bangkok	Meisam Nassiri; Mostafa Hosseinkhani; Ehsan Lashgari; Reza Yazdani; Parviz Hadi	Behnam Ehsanpour	Mohammad Naderi	1st
2017	New Delhi	Behnam Ehsanpour; Alireza Karimi; Yadollah Mohebbi	Hossein Shahbazi	Reza Atri; Meisam Nassiri; Hamed Rashidi; Bahman Teymouri	1st
2018	Bishkek	Ezzatollah Akbari; Hassan Yazdani; Mohammad Javad Ebrahimi	Mojtaba Goleij	Mostafa Hosseinkhani; Amin Taheri	2nd
2019	Xi'an	Reza Atri; Behnam Ehsanpour; Bahman Teymouri; Kamran Ghasempour; Alireza Karimi; Reza Yazdani; Yadollah Mohebbi	—	Peyman Biabani; Younes Emami; Mohammad Nokhodi	1st
2020	New Delhi	Mohammad Javad Ebrahimi; Mojtaba Goleij	Amir Hossein Hosseini; Ahmad Bazri	Amir Hossein Maghsoudi; Mostafa Hosseinkhani; Ali Savadkouhi; Parviz Hadi	1st
2021	Almaty	Hassan Yazdani; Kamran Ghasempour; Ali Shabani	Alireza Sarlak; Mostafa Hosseinkhani; Ali Savadkouhi	Morteza Ghiasi; Amin Taheri	1st
2022	Ulaanbaatar	Rahman Amouzad; Younes Emami; Ali Savadkouhi; Amir Hossein Firouzpour; Mohammad Hossein Mohammadian; Yadollah Mohebbi	Dariush Hazratgholizadeh	Mohsen Mostafavi	1st
2023	Astana	Rahman Amouzad	Alireza Karimi	Yasin Rezaei; Amir Hossein Kavousi; Mojtaba Goleij	3rd
2024	Bishkek	Rahman Amouzad; Amir Mohammad Yazdani; Mohammad Nokhodi; Amir Hossein Firouzpour; Amir Hossein Zare	—	Hossein Abouzari; Hadi Vafaeipour; Mohammad Hossein Mohammadian	1st
2025	Amman	Mehdi Yousefi; Abolfazl Rahmani; Amir Hossein Firouzpour; Amir Reza Masoumi	Milad Valizadeh	Ahmad Javan; Abbas Ebrahimzadeh; Sina Khalili; Mohammad Mobin Azimi	1st
2026	Bishkek	Milad Valizadeh; Kamran Ghasempour; Mohammad Mobin Azimi; Amir Hossein Zare	Amir Ali Azarpira	Ahmad Javan; Sina Khalili; Amir Mohammad Yazdani	1st

== See also ==
- Iranian results in men's freestyle wrestling
- Iranian Premier Wrestling League
- List of Iran national Greco-Roman wrestling medalists
