= Iranian results in men's freestyle wrestling =

Wrestlers from Iran have taken part in most of the major international men's freestyle wrestling competitions over the years, in particular the Olympic Games and World Wrestling Championships.

Iran first participated at the Olympic Games in 1948, and has sent wrestlers to compete in every Summer Olympic Games since then, except for 1980 and 1984 due to boycotts. Iran also did not send wrestlers to the World Championships in 1979, 1983, 1986, and 1987.

== Results by year ==
Legend

1	Gold medalist
2	Silver medalist
3	Bronze medalist
	Olympics
~~Name~~	Did not start

DQ	Disqualified after winning a medal
DQ	Disqualified during the competition
X	Did not place
—N/a	Event not held

=== 1948–1961 ===
Year	TR	52 kg	57 kg	62 kg	67 kg	73 kg	79 kg	87 kg	+87 kg
1948	—N/a	Mansour Raeisi (4)	~~Mansour Rahimiha~~	Hassan Saadian (11)	Ali Ghaffari (11)	Abbas Zandi (7)	Abbas Hariri (16)	Mansour Mirghavami (12)	Abolghasem Sakhdari (5)
1951	4th	Mahmoud Mollaghasemi (2)	Mehdi Yaghoubi (3)	Mehdi Mogharrab (6)	Ali Ghaffari (6)	Abdollah Mojtabavi (3)	Gholamreza Takhti (2)	Abbas Zandi (4)	Ahmad Vafadar (5)
1952	—N/a	Mahmoud Mollaghasemi (3)	Mehdi Yaghoubi (8)	Nasser Givehchi (2)	Tofigh Jahanbakht (3)	Abdollah Mojtabavi (3)	Gholamreza Takhti (2)	Abbas Zandi (5)	Ahmad Vafadar (9)
1954	3rd	Mahmoud Mollaghasemi (5)	Mehdi Yaghoubi (5)	Nasser Givehchi (5)	Tofigh Jahanbakht (1)	Mohammad Ali Fardin (2)	Abbas Zandi (1)	Gholamreza Takhti (5)	Ahmad Vafadar (X)
1956	—N/a	Mohammad Ali Khojastehpour (2)	Mehdi Yaghoubi (2)	Nasser Givehchi (6)	Emam-Ali Habibi (1)	Nabi Sorouri (4)	Abbas Zandi (7)	Gholamreza Takhti (1)	Hossein Nouri (9)
1957	3rd	Hassan Sheikhi (X)	Ali Banihashemi (4)	Hossein Mollaghasemi (2)	Mostafa Tajik (X)	Mohammad Ali Fardin (4)	Nabi Sorouri (1)	Hossein Nouri (4)	Gholamreza Takhti (X)
1959	4th	Mohammad Ali Khojastehpour (4)	Shaban Babaoladi (X)	Gholam Hossein Zandi (5)	Mostafa Tajik (X)	Emam-Ali Habibi (1)	Nabi Sorouri (5)	Gholamreza Takhti (1)	Yaghoub Ali Shourvarzi (6)
1960	—N/a	Ebrahim Seifpour (3)	Mehdi Yaghoubi (7)	Mohammad Khadem (8)	Mostafa Tajik (4)	Emam-Ali Habibi (4)	Mansour Mehdizadeh (12)	Gholamreza Takhti (2)	Yaghoub Ali Shourvarzi (10)
1961	1st	Nasrollah Soltaninejad (2)	Ebrahim Seifpour (1)	Hamid Tavakkol (3)	Mohammad Ali Sanatkaran (1)	Emam-Ali Habibi (1)	Mansour Mehdizadeh (1)	Gholamreza Takhti (1)	Hossein Nouri (5)

=== 1962–1968 ===
Year	TR	52 kg	57 kg	63 kg	70 kg	78 kg	87 kg	97 kg	+97 kg
1962	3rd	Nasrollah Soltaninejad (X)	Ebrahim Seifpour (X)	Mohammad Khadem (2)	Mohammad Ali Sanatkaran (4)	Emam-Ali Habibi (1)	Mansour Mehdizadeh (1)	Gholamreza Takhti (2)	Aziz Kiani (X)
1963	5th	Abdollah Khodabandeh (X)	Ghasem Dahandeh (5)	Ebrahim Seifpour (2)	Abdollah Movahed (6)	Mohammad Ali Sanatkaran (5)	Mansour Mehdizadeh (3)	Kheirollah Amiri (X)	Morteza Azizi (X)
1964	—N/a	Ali Akbar Heidari (3)	Abdollah Khodabandeh (9)	Ebrahim Seifpour (6)	Abdollah Movahed (5)	Mohammad Ali Sanatkaran (3)	Mansour Mehdizadeh (4)	Gholamreza Takhti (4)	No wrestler
1965	1st	Ali Akbar Heidari (4)	Mohammad Ali Farrokhian (2)	Ebrahim Seifpour (1)	Abdollah Movahed (1)	Mohammad Ali Sanatkaran (2)	Mansour Mehdizadeh (1)	Siavash Teymouri (X)	Ahmad Rezaei (X)
1966	4th	Ghasem Jafari (X)	Aboutaleb Talebi (3)	Mohammad Khadem (X)	Abdollah Movahed (1)	Hossein Tahami (3)	Mansour Mehdizadeh (5)	Gholamreza Takhti (X)	Abolfazl Anvari (3)
1967	3rd	Mohammad Ghorbani (6)	Aboutaleb Talebi (3)	Shamseddin Seyed-Abbasi (X)	Abdollah Movahed (1)	Ghadir Yaghoubi (6)	Majid Aghili (4)	Moslem Eskandar-Filabi (X)	Abolfazl Anvari (4)
1968	—N/a	Mohammad Ghorbani (7)	Aboutaleb Talebi (3)	Shamseddin Seyed-Abbasi (3)	Abdollah Movahed (1)	Ali Mohammad Momeni (4)	Mansour Mehdizadeh (22)	Moslem Eskandar-Filabi (9)	Abolfazl Anvari (6)

=== 1969–1996 ===
Year	TR	48 kg	52 kg	57 kg	62 kg	68 kg	74 kg	82 kg	90 kg	100 kg	+100 kg / 130 kg
1969	3rd	Ebrahim Javadi (1)	Mohammad Ghorbani (2)	Aboutaleb Talebi (3)	Shamseddin Seyed-Abbasi (2)	Abdollah Movahed (1)	Mohammad Farhangdoust (X)	Majid Aghili (5)	Mohammad Ali Sahraei (4)	Moslem Eskandar-Filabi (5)	Abolfazl Anvari (3)
1970	3rd	Ebrahim Javadi (1)	Mohammad Ghorbani (3)	Jahangir Abdolghader (X)	Shamseddin Seyed-Abbasi (1)	Abdollah Movahed (1)	Mohammad Farhangdoust (2)	Ali Hajiloo (X)	Mohammad Ali Sahraei (X)	Abolfazl Anvari (X)	Moslem Eskandar-Filabi (X)
1971	2nd	Ebrahim Javadi (1)	Mohammad Ghorbani (1)	Jahangir Abdolghader (9)	Shamseddin Seyed-Abbasi (2)	Abdollah Movahed (4)	Mohammad Farhangdoust (2)	Ali Hajiloo (12)	Reza Khorrami (4)	Abolfazl Anvari (12)	Moslem Eskandar-Filabi (4)
1972	—N/a	Ebrahim Javadi (3)	Mohammad Ghorbani (X)	Ramezan Kheder (7)	Shamseddin Seyed-Abbasi (5)	Abdollah Movahed (X)	Mansour Barzegar (5)	Ali Hajiloo (X)	Reza Khorrami (5)	Abolfazl Anvari (7)	Moslem Eskandar-Filabi (4)
1973	2nd	Ali Asghar Eslami (X)	Ebrahim Javadi (1)	Mohsen Farahvashi (1)	Mohammad Reza Navaei (3)	Kazem Gholami (5)	Mansour Barzegar (1)	Ali Hajiloo (X)	Reza Khorrami (5)	Reza Soukhtehsaraei (X)	Moslem Eskandar-Filabi (5)
1974	7th	Hossein Bitarafan (4)	Ali Asghar Eslami (5)	Ramezan Kheder (2)	Ghodrat Pourkarimi (X)	Kazem Gholami (X)	Mohammad Reza Taheri (X)	Bijan Zarafshani (X)	Ali Deghatpour (X)	Gholamreza Khalaj (X)	Davoud Ayoub (X)
1975	8th	Sobhan Rouhi (5)	Ghadir Nokhodchi (6)	Mohsen Farahvashi (X)	Ghodrat Pourkarimi (X)	Abdollah Hajahmadi (5)	Mansour Barzegar (2)	Mohammad Reza Taheri (X)	Ali Deghatpour (X)	Reza Soukhtehsaraei (X)	Davoud Ayoub (X)
1976	—N/a	Sobhan Rouhi (X)	Habib Fattahi (X)	Ramezan Kheder (5)	Mohsen Farahvashi (4)	Mohammad Reza Navaei (X)	Mansour Barzegar (2)	Mohammad Hassan Mohebbi (X)	Alireza Soleimani (X)	Reza Soukhtehsaraei (X)	Moslem Eskandar-Filabi (7)
1977	6th	Mohammad Bazmavar (4)	Ghadir Nokhodchi (5)	Ramezan Kheder (X)	Mohsen Farahvashi (6)	Ali Dehghan (X)	Mansour Barzegar (2)	Mohammad Hassan Mohebbi (X)	Mohammad Reza Taleghani (X)	Alireza Soleimani (4)	Reza Soukhtehsaraei (4)
1978	3rd	Mohammad Bazmavar (3)	Mohammad Hossein Dabbaghi (6)	Hassan Zare (X)	Mohammad Rezaei (3)	Abdollah Hajahmadi (X)	Mohammad Hossein Mohebbi (2)	Mohammad Hassan Mohebbi (X)	Hashem Kolahi (X)	Alireza Soleimani (X)	Reza Soukhtehsaraei (2)
1979	Did not participate										
1980	Did not participate										
1981	5th	Yaghoub Najafi (4)	Mohammad Hossein Dabbaghi (6)	Rasoul Hosseini (4)	Ahmad Rezaei (X)	Hassan Hamidi (5)	Mohammad Hossein Mohebbi (X)	Khodabakhsh Effatdar (X)	Mohammad Hassan Mohebbi (4)	Mohammad Reza Taleghani (X)	Reza Soukhtehsaraei (2)
1982	6th	Mohammad Bazmavar (4)	Amir Tehrani (6)	Ayoub Safavi (7)	Ahmad Rezaei (7)	Hassan Hamidi (6)	Mohammad Hossein Mohebbi (5)	Jabbar Mahdioun (9)	Mohammad Hassan Mohebbi (5)	Mahmoud Moradi Ganji (7)	Reza Soukhtehsaraei (4)
1983	Did not participate										
1984	Did not participate										
1985	13th	Majid Torkan (2)	Amir Tehrani (X)	Askari Mohammadian (X)	Mohsen Kaveh (X)	Khosro Pishro (X)	Allahmorad Zarini (X)	Mohammad Hossein Mohebbi (X)	Mohammad Hassan Mohebbi ~~(2)~~ (DQ)	Kazem Gholami (X)	Alireza Soleimani (6)
1986	Did not participate										
1987	Did not participate										
1988	—N/a	Nasser Zeinalnia (DQ)	Majid Torkan (13)	Askari Mohammadian (2)	Akbar Fallah (4)	Amir Reza Khadem (11)	Ayat Vagozari (6)	Ahmad Afghan (11)	Mohammad Reza Toupchi (17)	No wrestler	No wrestler
1989	5th	Nasser Zeinalnia (X)	Majid Torkan (3)	Askari Mohammadian (2)	Akbar Fallah (X)	Amir Reza Khadem (5)	Behrouz Yari (X)	Mohammad Hossein Mohebbi (7)	Esmaeil Fardin (X)	Mehdi Mohebbi (X)	Alireza Soleimani (1)
1990	4th	Nasser Zeinalnia (5)	Majid Torkan (1)	Askari Mohammadian (10)	Taghi Akbarnejad (X)	Ali Akbarnejad (X)	Amir Reza Khadem (3)	Mohammad Hossein Mohebbi (X)	Mohammad Hassan Mohebbi (3)	Jafar Khodaei (6)	Reza Soukhtehsaraei (8)
1991	3rd	Nasser Zeinalnia (6)	Majid Torkan (7)	Oveis Mallah (3)	Taghi Akbarnejad (5)	Akbar Fallah (9)	Amir Reza Khadem (1)	Rasoul Khadem (24)	Abbas Jadidi (7)	Kazem Gholami (9)	Alireza Soleimani (4)
1992	—N/a	Nader Rahmati (11)	Majid Torkan (7)	Oveis Mallah (9)	Askari Mohammadian (2)	Ali Akbarnejad (4)	Amir Reza Khadem (3)	Rasoul Khadem (3)	Ayoub Baninosrat (5)	Kazem Gholami (9)	Alireza Soleimani (6)
1993	7th	Nader Rahmati (X)	Gholamreza Mohammadi (2)	Ali Akbar Dodangeh (9)	Alireza Rezaeimanesh (X)	Akbar Fallah (1)	Behrouz Yari (X)	Amir Reza Khadem (X)	Abbas Jadidi ~~(1)~~ (DQ)	Rasoul Khadem (9)	Ebrahim Mehraban (7)
1994	4th	Nasser Zeinalnia (5)	Gholamreza Mohammadi (3)	Mohammad Talaei (2)	Reza Safaei (X)	Akbar Fallah (X)	Behrouz Yari (3)	Amir Reza Khadem (X)	Rasoul Khadem (1)	Ayoub Baninosrat (5)	Ebrahim Mehraban (8)
1995	2nd	Nader Rahmati (4)	Gholamreza Mohammadi (2)	Mohammad Talaei (6)	Abbas Hajkenari (13)	Akbar Fallah (2)	Behrouz Yari (8)	Amir Reza Khadem (7)	Rasoul Khadem (1)	Abbas Jadidi (3)	Ebrahim Mehraban (7)
1996	—N/a	No wrestler	Gholamreza Mohammadi (5)	Mohammad Talaei (6)	Abbas Hajkenari (19)	Akbar Fallah (10)	Issa Momeni (16)	Amir Reza Khadem (3)	Rasoul Khadem (1)	Abbas Jadidi (2)	Ebrahim Mehraban (12)

=== 1997–2001 ===
Year	TR	54 kg	58 kg	63 kg	69 kg	76 kg	85 kg	97 kg	130 kg
1997	3rd	Gholamreza Mohammadi (6)	Mohammad Talaei (1)	Abbas Hajkenari (1)	Davoud Ghanbari (5)	Amir Tavakkolian (11)	Alireza Heidari (3)	Abdolreza Kargar (15)	Ebrahim Mehraban (10)
1998	1st	Gholamreza Mohammadi (3)	Alireza Dabir (1)	Abbas Hajkenari (2)	Ali Akbarnejad (16)	Pejman Dorostkar (4)	Alireza Heidari (1)	Abbas Jadidi (1)	Rasoul Khadem (2)
1999	4th	Gholamreza Mohammadi (8)	Alireza Dabir (2)	Mohammad Talaei (6)	Amir Tavakkolian (13)	Masoud Jamshidi (18)	Abbas Majidi (24)	Alireza Heidari (2)	Abbas Jadidi (3)
2000	—N/a	Behnam Tayyebi (13)	Alireza Dabir (1)	Mohammad Talaei (4)	Amir Tavakkolian (10)	Pejman Dorostkar (12)	Amir Reza Khadem (4)	Alireza Heidari (6)	Abbas Jadidi (4)
2001	3rd	Babak Nourzad (2)	Behnam Tayyebi (10)	Alireza Dabir (2)	Amir Tavakkolian (2)	Mehdi Hajizadeh (6)	Majid Khodaei (14)	Alireza Heidari (16)	Abbas Jadidi (7)

=== 2002–2013 ===
Year	TR	55 kg	60 kg	66 kg	74 kg	84 kg	96 kg	120 kg
2002	1st	Babak Nourzad (12)	Mohammad Talaei (3)	Alireza Dabir (2)	Mehdi Hajizadeh (1)	Majid Khodaei (3)	Alireza Heidari (2)	Alireza Rezaei (13)
2003	3rd	Mohammad Aslani (4)	Mohammad Talaei (35)	Alireza Dabir (35)	Hadi Habibi (4)	Majid Khodaei (22)	Alireza Heidari (2)	Alireza Rezaei (3)
2004	—N/a	Babak Nourzad (16)	Masoud Mostafa-Jokar (2)	Alireza Dabir (18)	Mehdi Hajizadeh (13)	Majid Khodaei (5)	Alireza Heidari (3)	Alireza Rezaei (2)
2005	6th	Taghi Dadashi (13)	Morad Mohammadi (3)	Masoud Vahedi (10)	Mehdi Hajizadeh (5)	Fereydoun Ghanbari (14)	Amir Abbas Moradi Ganji (7)	Fardin Masoumi (8)
2006	2nd	Taghi Dadashi (8)	Morad Mohammadi (1)	Masoud Mostafa-Jokar (12)	Ali Asghar Bazri (2)	Reza Yazdani (3)	Alireza Heidari (5)	Fardin Masoumi (3)
2007	7th	Taghi Dadashi (17)	Morad Mohammadi (14)	Hassan Tahmasebi (26)	Ali Asghar Bazri (9)	Reza Yazdani (3)	Saeid Ebrahimi (2)	Fardin Masoumi (13)
2008	—N/a	Abbas Dabbaghi (10)	Morad Mohammadi (3)	Mehdi Taghavi (10)	Meisam Mostafa-Jokar (18)	Reza Yazdani (11)	Saeid Ebrahimi (9)	Fardin Masoumi (5)
2009	3rd	Hassan Rahimi (10)	Morad Mohammadi (5)	Mehdi Taghavi (1)	Sadegh Goudarzi (3)	Jamal Mirzaei (21)	Saeid Ebrahimi (5)	Fardin Masoumi (2)
2010	4th	Hassan Rahimi (11)	Morad Mohammadi (3)	Mehdi Taghavi (11)	Sadegh Goudarzi (2)	Ehsan Lashgari (18)	Erfan Amiri (5)	Fardin Masoumi (7)
2011	2nd	Hassan Rahimi (3)	Mostafa Aghajani (22)	Mehdi Taghavi (1)	Sadegh Goudarzi (2)	Alireza Goudarzi (7)	Reza Yazdani (1)	Fardin Masoumi (18)
2012	—N/a	Hassan Rahimi (8)	Masoud Esmaeilpour (7)	Mehdi Taghavi (14)	Sadegh Goudarzi (2)	Ehsan Lashgari (3)	Reza Yazdani (5)	Komeil Ghasemi (1)
2013	1st	Hassan Rahimi (1)	Masoud Esmaeilpour (3)	Mehdi Taghavi (21)	Ezzatollah Akbari (2)	Ehsan Lashgari (3)	Reza Yazdani (1)	Komeil Ghasemi (10)

=== 2014–2017 ===
Year	TR	57 kg	61 kg	65 kg	70 kg	74 kg	86 kg	97 kg	125 kg
2014	2nd	Hassan Rahimi (3)	Masoud Esmaeilpour (2)	Ahmad Mohammadi (2)	Mostafa Hosseinkhani (13)	Reza Afzali (13)	Mohammad Hossein Mohammadian (3)	Reza Yazdani (8)	Komeil Ghasemi (2)
2015	1st	Hassan Rahimi (2)	Behnam Ehsanpour (18)	Ahmad Mohammadi (3)	Hassan Yazdani (2)	Alireza Ghasemi (5)	Alireza Karimi (3)	Abbas Tahan (5)	Parviz Hadi (8)
2016	—N/a	Hassan Rahimi (3)	—N/a	Meisam Nassiri (15)	—N/a	Hassan Yazdani (1)	Alireza Karimi (7)	Reza Yazdani (7)	Komeil Ghasemi (2)
2016	—N/a	—N/a	Behnam Ehsanpour (5)	—N/a	Mostafa Hosseinkhani (3)	—N/a	—N/a	—N/a	—N/a
2017	9th	Reza Atri (13)	Behnam Ehsanpour (14)	Meisam Nassiri (10)	Mostafa Hosseinkhani (8)	Peyman Yarahmadi (22)	Hassan Yazdani (1)	Amir Mohammadi (12)	Yadollah Mohebbi (9)

=== 2018– ===
Year	TR	57 kg	61 kg	65 kg	70 kg	74 kg	79 kg	86 kg	92 kg	97 kg	125 kg
2018	6th	Reza Atri (11)	Bagher Yakhkeshi (5)	Amir Hossein Maghsoudi (20)	Younes Emami (19)	Mostafa Hosseinkhani (13)	Ezzatollah Akbari (5)	Hassan Yazdani (3)	Alireza Karimi (3)	Mojtaba Goleij (24)	Parviz Hadi (3)
2019	3rd	Reza Atri (5)	Behnam Ehsanpour (3)	Amir Mohammad Yazdani (14)	Younes Emami (3)	Reza Afzali (25)	Bahman Teymouri (12)	Hassan Yazdani (1)	Alireza Karimi (2)	Ali Shabani (10)	Yadollah Mohebbi (6)
2020	—N/a	Reza Atri (5)	—N/a	Morteza Ghiasi (8)	—N/a	Mostafa Hosseinkhani (15)	—N/a	Hassan Yazdani (2)	—N/a	Mohammad Hossein Mohammadian (13)	Amir Hossein Zare (3)
2021	3rd	Alireza Sarlak (2)	Rahman Amouzad (11)	Amir Mohammad Yazdani (2)	Erfan Elahi (8)	Younes Emami (8)	Mohammad Nokhodi (2)	Hassan Yazdani (1)	Kamran Ghasempour (1)	Mojtaba Goleij (3)	Amir Hossein Zare (1)
2022	2nd	Alireza Sarlak (23)	Reza Atri (2)	Rahman Amouzad (1)	~~Amir Mohammad Yazdani~~	Younes Emami (3)	Mohammad Nokhodi (2)	Hassan Yazdani (2)	Kamran Ghasempour (1)	Mohammad Hossein Mohammadian (5)	Amir Hossein Zare (3)
2023	2nd	Milad Valizadeh (8)	Reza Atri (21)	Rahman Amouzad (5)	Amir Mohammad Yazdani (2)	Younes Emami (10)	Mohammad Nokhodi (3)	Hassan Yazdani (2)	Amir Ali Azarpira (8)	Mojtaba Goleij (8)	Amir Hossein Zare (1)
2024	—N/a	~~Alireza Sarlak~~	—N/a	Rahman Amouzad (2)	—N/a	Younes Emami (7)	—N/a	Hassan Yazdani (2)	—N/a	Amir Ali Azarpira (3)	Amir Hossein Zare (2)
2024	2nd	—N/a	Reza Momeni (7)	—N/a	Sina Khalili (7)	—N/a	Mohammad Nokhodi (2)	—N/a	Kamran Ghasempour (5)	—N/a	—N/a
2025	1st	Ali Momeni (17)	Ahmad Javan (2)	Rahman Amouzad (1)	Amir Mohammad Yazdani (21)	Younes Emami (5)	Mohammad Nokhodi (3)	Kamran Ghasempour (3)	Amir Hossein Firouzpour (3)	Amir Ali Azarpira (2)	Amir Hossein Zare (1)
2026	3rd	Milad Valizadeh (7)	Ahmad Javan (1)	Rahman Amouzad (3)	Sina Khalili (12)	Amir Mohammad Yazdani (3)	Mohammad Nokhodi (2)	Kamran Ghasempour (19)	Amir Hossein Firouzpour (5)	Hassan Yazdani (3)	Amir Hossein Zare (1)

== See also ==
- List of World and Olympic Champions in men's freestyle wrestling
- List of Cadet, Junior, and Espoir World Champions in men's freestyle wrestling
- List of Iran national freestyle wrestling medalists
- Iranian results in men's Greco-Roman wrestling
- Soviet and Russian results in men's freestyle wrestling
- United States results in men's freestyle wrestling
