= Iran at the 1986 Asian Games =

- IOC code: IRN
- NOC: National Olympic Committee of the Islamic Republic of Iran
- Website: www.olympic.ir (in Persian and English)

in Seoul
- Competitors: 94 in 9 sports
- Flag bearer: Reza Soukhtehsaraei
- Medals Ranked 4th: Gold 6 Silver 6 Bronze 10 Total 22

Asian Games appearances (overview)
- 1951; 1954; 1958; 1962; 1966; 1970; 1974; 1978; 1982; 1986; 1990; 1994; 1998; 2002; 2006; 2010; 2014; 2018; 2022; 2026

Iran participated in the 1986 Asian Games held in the capital city of Seoul. This country is ranked 4th with 6 gold medals in this edition of the Asiad.

== Medal summary ==
=== Medals by sport ===
Sport	Gold	Silver	Bronze	Total
Cycling track	1		1	2
Judo			1	1
Taekwondo	1	1		2
Weightlifting			2	2
Wrestling	4	5	6	15
Total	6	6	10	22

=== Medalists ===
Medal	Name	Sport	Event
Gold	Ali Zangiabadi	Cycling track	Men's points race
Gold	Ebrahim Ghaderi	Taekwondo	Men's 58 kg
Gold	Majid Torkan	Wrestling	Men's freestyle 48 kg
Gold	Askari Mohammadian	Wrestling	Men's freestyle 57 kg
Gold	Alireza Soleimani	Wrestling	Men's freestyle 130 kg
Gold	Reza Soukhtehsaraei	Wrestling	Men's Greco-Roman 130 kg
Silver	Ali Hajipour	Taekwondo	Men's 70 kg
Silver	Yaghoub Najafi	Wrestling	Men's freestyle 52 kg
Silver	Allahmorad Zarini	Wrestling	Men's freestyle 74 kg
Silver	Mohammad Hassan Mohebbi	Wrestling	Men's freestyle 90 kg
Silver	Abdolkarim Kakahaji	Wrestling	Men's Greco-Roman 52 kg
Silver	Reza Andouz	Wrestling	Men's Greco-Roman 74 kg
Bronze	Mehrdad Afsharian	Cycling track	Men's individual pursuit
Bronze	Morteza Khodadadi	Judo	Men's 60 kg
Bronze	Darab Riahi	Weightlifting	Men's 90 kg
Bronze	Mehdi Rezvani	Weightlifting	Men's +110 kg
Bronze	Akbar Fallah	Wrestling	Men's freestyle 62 kg
Bronze	Ali Akbarnejad	Wrestling	Men's freestyle 68 kg
Bronze	Mohammad Hossein Mohebbi	Wrestling	Men's freestyle 82 kg
Bronze	Kazem Gholami	Wrestling	Men's freestyle 100 kg
Bronze	Ahad Javansalehi	Wrestling	Men's Greco-Roman 62 kg
Bronze	Fereydoun Behnampour	Wrestling	Men's Greco-Roman 82 kg

== Results by event ==
=== Aquatics ===
==== Water polo ====
Men

Squad list	Round robin	Rank
Mehrzad Eidipour; Abdolnasser Hardani; Ali Moheb; Farshad Molatalab; Hossein Nasim; Iraj Raoufazar; Hossein Rezaei; Davoud Rezasoltani; Mehrdad Saleh; Hamid Shabangiz; Gholamreza Soleimani; Ahmad Yaghouti; Coach: Mansour Garousi	Kuwait; W 6–4	4
Mehrzad Eidipour; Abdolnasser Hardani; Ali Moheb; Farshad Molatalab; Hossein Nasim; Iraj Raoufazar; Hossein Rezaei; Davoud Rezasoltani; Mehrdad Saleh; Hamid Shabangiz; Gholamreza Soleimani; Ahmad Yaghouti; Coach: Mansour Garousi	India; W 15–4	4
Mehrzad Eidipour; Abdolnasser Hardani; Ali Moheb; Farshad Molatalab; Hossein Nasim; Iraj Raoufazar; Hossein Rezaei; Davoud Rezasoltani; Mehrdad Saleh; Hamid Shabangiz; Gholamreza Soleimani; Ahmad Yaghouti; Coach: Mansour Garousi	South Korea; L 6–10	4
Mehrzad Eidipour; Abdolnasser Hardani; Ali Moheb; Farshad Molatalab; Hossein Nasim; Iraj Raoufazar; Hossein Rezaei; Davoud Rezasoltani; Mehrdad Saleh; Hamid Shabangiz; Gholamreza Soleimani; Ahmad Yaghouti; Coach: Mansour Garousi	Singapore; D 8–8	4
Mehrzad Eidipour; Abdolnasser Hardani; Ali Moheb; Farshad Molatalab; Hossein Nasim; Iraj Raoufazar; Hossein Rezaei; Davoud Rezasoltani; Mehrdad Saleh; Hamid Shabangiz; Gholamreza Soleimani; Ahmad Yaghouti; Coach: Mansour Garousi	China; L 3–21	4

=== Athletics ===
Men

Athlete	Event	Final	
Athlete	Event	Result	Rank
Ardeshir Ghandoumi	High jump	2.05	7

- Mohammad Ali Mohammadi
- Mohammad Vojdanzdaeh

=== Cycling ===
Men

Athlete	Event	Final	Rank
Mehrdad Afsharian	4 km individual pursuit	4:55:38	Bronze medal
Ali Zangiabadi	30 km points race	34 pts	Gold medal

- Ezzatollah Mazaheri
- Saeid Zareeian
- Siamak Safarzadeh
- Mehrdad Safarzadeh
- Abolghasem Rahmanian
- Mohammad Reza Bajoul

=== Football ===
Men

Squad list	Preliminary round		Quarterfinal	Semifinal	Final	Rank
Squad list	Group D	Rank	Quarterfinal	Semifinal	Final	Rank
Ahmad Sajjadi; Asghar Hajiloo; Shahin Bayani; Mohammad Panjali; Shahrokh Bayani; Majid Namjoo-Motlagh; Nasser Mohammadkhani; Zia Arabshahi; Mehdi Abtahi; Karim Bavi; Hamid Derakhshan; Gholamreza Fathabadi; Farshad Pious; Abdolali Changiz; Morteza Yekkeh; Hossein Mesgar Saravi; Majid Rezaei; Morteza Fonounizadeh; Siamak Rahimpour; Sirous Ghayeghran; Coach: Parviz Dehdari	Japan; W 2–0	2 Q	South Korea; L 1–1, 4–5 Pen	Did not advance		5
Ahmad Sajjadi; Asghar Hajiloo; Shahin Bayani; Mohammad Panjali; Shahrokh Bayani; Majid Namjoo-Motlagh; Nasser Mohammadkhani; Zia Arabshahi; Mehdi Abtahi; Karim Bavi; Hamid Derakhshan; Gholamreza Fathabadi; Farshad Pious; Abdolali Changiz; Morteza Yekkeh; Hossein Mesgar Saravi; Majid Rezaei; Morteza Fonounizadeh; Siamak Rahimpour; Sirous Ghayeghran; Coach: Parviz Dehdari	Bangladesh; W 4–0	2 Q	South Korea; L 1–1, 4–5 Pen	Did not advance		5
Ahmad Sajjadi; Asghar Hajiloo; Shahin Bayani; Mohammad Panjali; Shahrokh Bayani; Majid Namjoo-Motlagh; Nasser Mohammadkhani; Zia Arabshahi; Mehdi Abtahi; Karim Bavi; Hamid Derakhshan; Gholamreza Fathabadi; Farshad Pious; Abdolali Changiz; Morteza Yekkeh; Hossein Mesgar Saravi; Majid Rezaei; Morteza Fonounizadeh; Siamak Rahimpour; Sirous Ghayeghran; Coach: Parviz Dehdari	Kuwait; L 0–1	2 Q	South Korea; L 1–1, 4–5 Pen	Did not advance		5
Ahmad Sajjadi; Asghar Hajiloo; Shahin Bayani; Mohammad Panjali; Shahrokh Bayani; Majid Namjoo-Motlagh; Nasser Mohammadkhani; Zia Arabshahi; Mehdi Abtahi; Karim Bavi; Hamid Derakhshan; Gholamreza Fathabadi; Farshad Pious; Abdolali Changiz; Morteza Yekkeh; Hossein Mesgar Saravi; Majid Rezaei; Morteza Fonounizadeh; Siamak Rahimpour; Sirous Ghayeghran; Coach: Parviz Dehdari	Nepal; W 6–0	2 Q	South Korea; L 1–1, 4–5 Pen	Did not advance		5

=== Handball ===
Men

Squad list	Round robin	Rank
Ghasem Shaabanpour; Majid Soleimani; Hossein Esmaeilzadeh; Masoud Fatehi; Abolfazl Ahmadi; Mohammad Reza Garshasebi; Ezzatollah Razmgar; Mostafa Baghal; Ali Souri; Keivan Sadeghi; Mohammad Reza Hosseinzadeh; Asadollah Reihani; Coach: Khosro Nassiri	Japan; L 16–38	5
Ghasem Shaabanpour; Majid Soleimani; Hossein Esmaeilzadeh; Masoud Fatehi; Abolfazl Ahmadi; Mohammad Reza Garshasebi; Ezzatollah Razmgar; Mostafa Baghal; Ali Souri; Keivan Sadeghi; Mohammad Reza Hosseinzadeh; Asadollah Reihani; Coach: Khosro Nassiri	China; L 11–35	5
Ghasem Shaabanpour; Majid Soleimani; Hossein Esmaeilzadeh; Masoud Fatehi; Abolfazl Ahmadi; Mohammad Reza Garshasebi; Ezzatollah Razmgar; Mostafa Baghal; Ali Souri; Keivan Sadeghi; Mohammad Reza Hosseinzadeh; Asadollah Reihani; Coach: Khosro Nassiri	Kuwait; L 24–46	5
Ghasem Shaabanpour; Majid Soleimani; Hossein Esmaeilzadeh; Masoud Fatehi; Abolfazl Ahmadi; Mohammad Reza Garshasebi; Ezzatollah Razmgar; Mostafa Baghal; Ali Souri; Keivan Sadeghi; Mohammad Reza Hosseinzadeh; Asadollah Reihani; Coach: Khosro Nassiri	South Korea; L 17–48	5
Ghasem Shaabanpour; Majid Soleimani; Hossein Esmaeilzadeh; Masoud Fatehi; Abolfazl Ahmadi; Mohammad Reza Garshasebi; Ezzatollah Razmgar; Mostafa Baghal; Ali Souri; Keivan Sadeghi; Mohammad Reza Hosseinzadeh; Asadollah Reihani; Coach: Khosro Nassiri	Hong Kong; W 22–18	5

=== Judo ===
Men

Athlete	Event	Rank
Morteza Khodadadi	–60 kg	Bronze medal

- Jahangir Ghourkhanji
- Mehdi Seilpour
- Azim Ganji

=== Taekwondo ===
Athlete	Event	Round of 16	Quarterfinal	Semifinal	Final	Rank
Manouchehr Nazari	Men's 54 kg	Bye	Meksawan (THA); L PTS	Did not advance		5
Ebrahim Ghaderi	Men's 58 kg	Changjong (THA); W PTS	Saleh (BRN); W PTS	Ghachhe (NEP); W PTS	Rozak (INA); W PTS	1st place, gold medalist(s)
Mohammad Ali Ghaderi	Men's 64 kg	Anan (INA); W PTS	Al-Owjan (QAT); L PTS	Did not advance		5
Ali Hajipour	Men's 70 kg	Al-Fayz (QAT); W PTS	So (HKG); W PTS	Al-Fadhel (KUW); W SUP	Park (KOR); L PTS	2nd place, silver medalist(s)
Hassan Zahedi	Men's 76 kg	Moon (KOR); L PTS	Did not advance			9

=== Weightlifting ===
Athlete	Event	Snatch		Clean & Jerk		Total	
Athlete	Event	Result	Rank	Result	Rank	Result	Rank
Samad Montazeri	Men's 52 kg	100.0	3	120.0	5	220.0	4
Abbas Talebi	Men's 67.5 kg	127.5	4	160.0	5	287.5	5
Ardeshir Bahmanyar	Men's 82.5 kg	137.5	4	175.0	4	312.5	4
Rasoul Javidasa	Men's 82.5 kg	NM	—	—	—	—	—
Abdollah Fatemi	Men's 90 kg	150.0	3	180.0	7	330.0	4
Darab Riahi	Men's 90 kg	155.0	2	175.0	8	330.0	3rd place, bronze medalist(s)
Siamak Bajand	Men's 100 kg	150.0	6	NM	—	—	—
Ali Moradi	Men's 100 kg	157.5	2	185.0	6	342.5	6
Aziz Alihosseini	Men's 110 kg	147.5	4	165.0	7	312.5	7
Mehdi Rezvani	Men's +110 kg	155.0	3	190.0	3	345.0	3rd place, bronze medalist(s)

=== Wrestling ===
Men's freestyle

Athlete	Event	Final	Rank
Majid Torkan	48 kg	Gao (CHN); W 12–0	Gold medal
Yaghoub Najafi	52 kg	Sato (JPN); L Fall	Silver medal
Askari Mohammadian	57 kg	Kong (KOR); W	Gold medal
Akbar Fallah	62 kg	3rd place match Rohtas (IND); W 12–1	Bronze medal
Ali Akbarnejad	68 kg	3rd place match Satyawan (IND); W	Bronze medal
Allahmorad Zarini	74 kg	Han (KOR); L	Silver medal
Mohammad Hossein Mohebbi	82 kg	3rd place match Feng (CHN); W 9–1	Bronze medal
Mohammad Hassan Mohebbi	90 kg	Majeed (PAK); L	Silver medal
Kazem Gholami	100 kg	3rd place match Li (CHN); W	Bronze medal
Alireza Soleimani	130 kg	Jassem (IRQ); W	Gold medal

Men's Greco-Roman

Athlete	Event	Final	Rank
Morteza Papinia	48 kg	3rd place match Saito (JPN); L 6–13	4
Abdolkarim Kakahaji	52 kg	Miyahara (JPN); L 4–8	Silver medal
Hossein Niknejad	57 kg	Did not advance	5
Ahad Javansalehi	62 kg	3rd place match Zhao (CHN); W	Bronze medal
Abdollah Chamangoli	68 kg	3rd place match A (CHN); L	4
Reza Andouz	74 kg	Kim (KOR); L	Silver medal
Fereydoun Behnampour	82 kg	3rd place match Shihab (IRQ); W	Bronze medal
Hassan Babak	90 kg	3rd place match Eom (KOR); L	4
Mohammad Azizian	100 kg	Did not advance	6
Reza Soukhtehsaraei	130 kg	Ando (JPN); W 4–0	Gold medal
