= Akbarnejad =

Akbarnejad may refer to:

- Ali Akbarnejad
- Mohammad-Taqi Akbar-Nejad
