= Taekwondo at the 1986 Asian Games – Men's 58 kg =

Taekwondo competition

Men's 58 kg at the 1986 Asian Games
- Venue: Sungkyunkwan University
- Date: 1 October 1986
- Competitors: 12 from 12 nations

Medalists
gold medal	Ebrahim Ghaderi	Iran
silver medal	Abdul Rozak	Indonesia
bronze medal	Tareq Lababidi	Jordan
bronze medal	Ram Bahadur Ghachhe	Nepal

The men's bantamweight (58 kilograms) event at the 1986 Asian Games took place on 1 October 1986 at Sungkyunkwan University, Seoul, South Korea.

A total of twelve competitors competed in this event, limited to fighters whose body weight was less than 58 kilograms.

== Schedule ==
All times are Korea Standard Time (UTC+09:00)

Date	Time	Event
Wednesday, 1 October 1986	10:00	Round of 16
Wednesday, 1 October 1986	10:00	Quarterfinals
Wednesday, 1 October 1986	10:00	Semifinals
Wednesday, 1 October 1986	10:00	Final

== Results ==
Legend

- KO — Won by knockout
- PTS — Won by points
- SUP — Won by superiority

Round of 16
Dinesh Kumar Singh (IND)
Naser Al-Azemi (KUW)	KO
Fareid Fayroze (QAT)
Tareq Lababidi (JOR)
Ebrahim Ghaderi (IRN)	PTS
Paisarn Changjong (THA)
Mineo Shibano (JPN)
Stephen Fernandez (PHI)	PTS

Quarterfinals
Abdul Rozak (INA)	SUP
Naser Al-Azemi (KUW)
Tareq Lababidi (JOR)	PTS
Hong Jong-man (KOR)
Khalid Saleh (BRN)
Ebrahim Ghaderi (IRN)	PTS
Stephen Fernandez (PHI)
Ram Bahadur Ghachhe (NEP)

Semifinals
Abdul Rozak (INA)	PTS
Tareq Lababidi (JOR)
Ebrahim Ghaderi (IRN)	PTS
Ram Bahadur Ghachhe (NEP)

Final
Abdul Rozak (INA)
Ebrahim Ghaderi (IRN)	PTS
