= 1981 Asian Wrestling Championships =

- Host city: Lahore, Pakistan
- Dates: 1–4 December 1981
- Stadium: Fortress Stadium

Champions
- Freestyle: Iran

The 1981 Asian Wrestling Championships were held in Fortress Stadium, Lahore, Pakistan. The event took place from 1 to 4 December 1981.

== Medal table ==
Rank	Nation	Gold	Silver	Bronze	Total
1	Iran	8	1	1	10
2	Japan	2	4	1	7
3	India	0	3	6	9
4	Iraq	0	1	1	2
4	Pakistan	0	1	1	2
Totals (5 entries)		10	10	10	30

== Team ranking ==
Rank	Men's freestyle	
Rank	Team	Points
1	Iran	57
2	Japan	39
3	India	39
4	Pakistan	26
5	Iraq	15

== Medal summary ==
=== Men's freestyle ===
Event	Gold	Silver	Bronze
48 kg	Yaghoub Najafi; Iran	Sohail Rashid; Pakistan	Ram Pal; India
52 kg	Toshio Asakura; Japan	Mahabir Singh; India	Mohammad Bazmavar; Iran
57 kg	Rasoul Hosseini; Iran	Ashok Kumar; India	Tatsuya Takita; Japan
62 kg	Ahmad Rezaei; Iran	Hiroshi Kaneko; Japan	Gian Singh; India
68 kg	Hassan Hamidi; Iran	Masakazu Kamimura; Japan	Om Singh; India
74 kg	Mohammad Hossein Mohebbi; Iran	Ali Hussein; Iraq	Rajinder Singh; India
82 kg	Akira Ota; Japan	Jabbar Mahdioun; Iran	Jagdish Kumar; India
90 kg	Mohammad Hassan Mohebbi; Iran	Osamu Asano; Japan	Kartar Singh; India
100 kg	Hashem Kolahi; Iran	Satpal Singh; India	Muhammad Salahuddin; Pakistan
+100 kg	Alireza Soleimani; Iran	Hisakazu Tabata; Japan	Nasir Hussein; Iraq

== Participating nations ==
- China
- India (10)
- Indonesia
- Iran (10)
- Iraq
- Japan (8)
- Pakistan (10)
