= Wrestling at the 1986 Asian Games =

- Venue: Sangmu Gymnasium
- Dates: 25 September – 4 October 1986

Wrestling was one of the sports which was held at the 1986 Asian Games in Seoul, South Korea between 25 September and 4 October 1986. The competition included only men's events.

== Medalists ==
=== Freestyle ===
Event	Gold	Silver	Bronze
48 kg	Majid Torkan; Iran	Gao Wenhe; China	Takashi Irie; Japan
52 kg	Mitsuru Sato; Japan	Yaghoub Najafi; Iran	Son Gab-do; South Korea
57 kg	Askari Mohammadian; Iran	Kong Yong-il; South Korea	Toshio Asakura; Japan
62 kg	Lee Jung-keun; South Korea	Kazuhito Sakae; Japan	Akbar Fallah; Iran
68 kg	Kim Soo-hwan; South Korea	Kosei Akaishi; Japan	Ali Akbarnejad; Iran
74 kg	Han Myung-woo; South Korea	Allahmorad Zarini; Iran	Tomohiro Tsunozaki; Japan
82 kg	Oh Hyo-chul; South Korea	Takashi Kikuchi; Japan	Mohammad Hossein Mohebbi; Iran
90 kg	Abdul Majeed Maruwala; Pakistan	Mohammad Hassan Mohebbi; Iran	Suresh Kumar; India
100 kg	Kartar Singh; India	Shahid Pervaiz Butt; Pakistan	Kazem Gholami; Iran
130 kg	Alireza Soleimani; Iran	Farhan Jassim; Iraq	Gurmukh Singh; India

=== Greco-Roman ===
Event	Gold	Silver	Bronze
48 kg	Kim Young-gu; South Korea	Li Haisheng; China	Ikuzo Saito; Japan
52 kg	Atsuji Miyahara; Japan	Abdolkarim Kakahaji; Iran	Lee Jin-hi; South Korea
57 kg	Shunji Nakadome; Japan	Ba Sier; China	Kim Seong-min; South Korea
62 kg	Seiichi Osanai; Japan	An Dae-hyun; South Korea	Ahad Javansalehi; Iran
68 kg	Lee Sam-sung; South Korea	Takumi Mori; Japan	A Ji; China
74 kg	Kim Young-nam; South Korea	Reza Andouz; Iran	Hiromichi Ito; Japan
82 kg	Kim Sang-kyu; South Korea	Takahiro Mukai; Japan	Fereydoun Behnampour; Iran
90 kg	Yasutoshi Moriyama; Japan	Ao Rong; China	Eom Jin-han; South Korea
100 kg	Kim Gi-jung; South Korea	Bao Yu; China	Tsutomu Kondo; Japan
130 kg	Reza Soukhtehsaraei; Iran	Masaya Ando; Japan	Kim Dae-kwan; South Korea

== Medal table ==
Rank	Nation	Gold	Silver	Bronze	Total
1	South Korea (KOR)	9	2	5	16
2	Japan (JPN)	5	6	6	17
3	Iran (IRN)	4	5	6	15
4	Pakistan (PAK)	1	1	0	2
5	India (IND)	1	0	2	3
6	China (CHN)	0	5	1	6
7	Iraq (IRQ)	0	1	0	1
Totals (7 entries)		20	20	20	60
