= 1995 Asian Wrestling Championships =

- Host city: Manila, Philippines
- Dates: 27 June – 3 July 1995
- Stadium: Ninoy Aquino Stadium

Champions
- Freestyle: Iran
- Greco-Roman: Kazakhstan

The 1995 Asian Wrestling Championships were held in Manila, Philippines. The event took place from June 27 to July 3, 1995.

== Medal table ==
Rank	Nation	Gold	Silver	Bronze	Total
1	South Korea	7	2	1	10
2	Iran	5	3	4	12
3	Kazakhstan	5	1	3	9
4	Japan	1	4	4	9
5	Uzbekistan	1	3	2	6
6	Syria	1	0	0	1
7	China	0	3	2	5
8	Mongolia	0	2	2	4
9	Kyrgyzstan	0	2	1	3
10	Turkmenistan	0	0	1	1
Totals (10 entries)		20	20	20	60

== Team ranking ==
Rank	Men's freestyle		Men's Greco-Roman	
Rank	Team	Points	Team	Points
1	Iran	82	Kazakhstan	82
2	South Korea	77	South Korea	78
3	Japan	68	Iran	65
4	Kazakhstan	59	China	64
5	Mongolia	57	Japan	59

== Medal summary ==
=== Men's freestyle ===
Event	Gold	Silver	Bronze
48 kg	Jung Soon-won; South Korea	Masanori Toida; Japan	Tümendembereliin Züünbayan; Mongolia
52 kg	Kim Jong-shin; South Korea	Mais Ibadov; Uzbekistan	Hossein Karimi; Iran
57 kg	Sanshiro Abe; Japan	Oveis Mallah; Iran	Maksat Boburbekov; Kyrgyzstan
62 kg	Ramil Islamov; Uzbekistan	Noh Won-chang; South Korea	Takahiro Wada; Japan
68 kg	Amir Tavakkolian; Iran	Tovuudorjiin Gansükh; Mongolia	Ryusaburo Katsu; Japan
74 kg	Issa Momeni; Iran	Nurbek Izabekov; Kyrgyzstan	Kim Kyung-won; South Korea
82 kg	Elmadi Zhabrailov; Kazakhstan	Agvaansamdangiin Sükhbat; Mongolia	Ruslan Khinchagov; Uzbekistan
90 kg	Rasoul Khadem; Iran	Tatsuo Kawai; Japan	Bayanmönkhiin Gantogtokh; Mongolia
100 kg	Kim Tae-woo; South Korea	Ba Tumengke; China	Ayoub Baninosrat; Iran
130 kg	Mansour Abedian; Iran	Igor Klimov; Kazakhstan	Feng Aigang; China

=== Men's Greco-Roman ===
Event	Gold	Silver	Bronze
48 kg	Sim Kwon-ho; South Korea	Dmitri Korshunov; Uzbekistan	Fanis Dauletov; Kazakhstan
52 kg	Khaled Al-Faraj; Syria	Han Yuwei; China	Kamil Murtizade; Kazakhstan
57 kg	An Han-bong; South Korea	Daisuke Hanahara; Japan	Akhmetulla Nurov; Kazakhstan
62 kg	Choi Sang-sun; South Korea	Bakhodir Kurbanov; Uzbekistan	Ahad Pazaj; Iran
68 kg	Son Sang-pil; South Korea	Yasushi Miyake; Japan	Grigori Pulyaev; Uzbekistan
74 kg	Ruslan Zhumabekov; Kazakhstan	Majid Mousavi; Iran	Takamitsu Katayama; Japan
82 kg	Bakhtiyar Baiseitov; Kazakhstan	Raatbek Sanatbayev; Kyrgyzstan	Behrouz Jamshidi; Iran
90 kg	Daulet Turlykhanov; Kazakhstan	Eom Jin-han; South Korea	Rozy Rejepow; Turkmenistan
100 kg	Sergey Matviyenko; Kazakhstan	Ayoub Namdari; Iran	Ba Yanchuan; China
130 kg	Alireza Lorestani; Iran	Hu Riga; China	Minoru Hamaue; Japan
