= Abdolkarim Kakahaji =

Iranian Greco-Roman wrestler

Personal information
- Born: 27 October 1961 (age 64) Dezful

Sport
- Sport: Greco-Roman wrestling
Medal record
Representing Iran
Asian Games
Silver medal – second place	1986 Seoul	52 kg
Asian Championships
Silver medal – second place	1989 Oarai	52 kg

Abdolkarim Kakahaji (Persian: عبدالکریم کاکاحاجی, born 27 October 1961 in Dezful) is a retired Greco-Roman wrestler from Iran. He won a silver medal at the 1986 Asian Games in Seoul. He also participated at the 1988 Summer Olympics.
