= 1989 Asian Wrestling Championships =

- Host city: Oarai, Japan
- Dates: 30 June – 2 July 1989

Champions
- Freestyle: Iran
- Greco-Roman: South Korea

The 1989 Asian Wrestling Championships were held in Oarai, Japan. The event took place from June 30 to July 2, 1989.

== Medal table ==
Rank	Nation	Gold	Silver	Bronze	Total
1	South Korea	6	5	4	15
2	Iran	6	5	3	14
3	Japan	4	4	5	13
4	Mongolia	3	1	2	6
5	North Korea	0	3	0	3
6	Pakistan	0	2	0	2
7	Iraq	0	1	1	2
8	China	0	0	3	3
9	India	0	0	2	2
Totals (9 entries)		19	21	20	60

== Team ranking ==
Rank	Men's freestyle		Men's Greco-Roman	
Rank	Team	Points	Team	Points
1	Iran	46	South Korea	53
2	Mongolia	34	Japan	48
3	South Korea	34	Iran	38
4	Japan	30	India	21
5	North Korea	23	China	16

== Medal summary ==
=== Men's freestyle ===
Event	Gold	Silver	Bronze
48 kg	Choidognyambuugiin Batbadral; Mongolia	Kim Sun-chol; North Korea	Kim Jong-shin; South Korea
52 kg	Majid Torkan; Iran	Kim Myong-soo; North Korea	Jagdeep Singh; India
57 kg	Noh Kyung-sun; South Korea	Askari Mohammadian; Iran	Ryo Kanehama; Japan
62 kg	Kazuhito Sakae; Japan	Lee Jung-keun; South Korea	Taghi Akbarnejad; Iran
68 kg	Khenmedekhiin Amaraa; Mongolia	Kosei Akaishi; Japan	Park Jang-soon; South Korea
74 kg	Behrouz Yari; Iran	Kim Kwang-soo; South Korea	Lodoin Enkhbayar; Mongolia
82 kg	Puntsagiin Sükhbat; Mongolia	Yu Sang-man; North Korea	Mohammad Hossein Mohebbi; Iran
90 kg	Mohammad Hassan Mohebbi; Iran	Abdul Majeed Maruwala; Pakistan	Chadraabalyn Byambadorj; Mongolia
100 kg	Mohammad Reza Toupchi; Iran	Shahid Pervaiz Butt; Pakistan	Subhash Verma; India
130 kg	Alireza Soleimani; Iran	Aduuchiin Baatarkhüü; Mongolia	Hiroyuki Obata; Japan

=== Men's Greco-Roman ===
Event	Gold	Silver	Bronze
48 kg	None awarded	Goun Duk-yong; South Korea	Yang Zhizhong; China
48 kg	None awarded	Masanori Ohashi; Japan	Yang Zhizhong; China
52 kg	An Han-bong; South Korea	Abdolkarim Kakahaji; Iran	Shohei Nakamori; Japan
57 kg	Kim Jin-wan; South Korea	Michizo Fujioka; Japan	Ghazi Faisal; Iraq
62 kg	Huh Byung-ho; South Korea	Hassan Yousefi Afshar; Iran	Shigeki Nishiguchi; Japan
68 kg	Yasuhiro Okubo; Japan	Kim Sung-moon; South Korea	Abdollah Chamangoli; Iran
74 kg	Park Myung-suk; South Korea	Hiromichi Ito; Japan	Wei Qingkun; China
82 kg	Kim Sang-kyu; South Korea	Abdul-Rahman Breesam; Iraq	Tamotsu Yabiku; Japan
90 kg	Yasutoshi Moriyama; Japan	Hassan Babak; Iran	Eom Jin-han; South Korea
100 kg	Tsutomu Kondo; Japan	Mohammad Naderi; Iran	Yoo Young-tae; South Korea
130 kg	Alireza Lorestani; Iran	Kim Dae-kwan; South Korea	Tian Lei; China
