= 1979 Asian Wrestling Championships =

1979 Asian Championships
- Host city: Jalandhar, India
- Dates: 8–11 November

Champions
- Freestyle: Iran

The following is the final results of the 1979 Asian Wrestling Championships.

== Medal table ==
Rank	Nation	Gold	Silver	Bronze	Total
1	Japan	5	1	1	7
2	Iran	4	2	3	9
3	Pakistan	1	0	1	2
4	India	0	6	2	8
5	South Korea	0	1	2	3
6	China	0	0	1	1
Totals (6 entries)		10	10	10	30

== Team ranking ==
Rank	Men's freestyle	
Rank	Team	Points
1	Iran	40
2	Japan	38
3	India	34
4	South Korea	15
5	Pakistan	14

== Medal summary ==
=== Men's freestyle ===
Event	Gold	Silver	Bronze
48 kg	Takashi Irie; Japan	Mahabir Singh; India	Sobhan Rouhi; Iran
52 kg	Masaki Motozawa; Japan	Ashok Kumar; India	Lee Jong-young; South Korea
57 kg	Muhammad Azeem; Pakistan	Rasoul Hosseini; Iran	Gian Singh; India
62 kg	Tsuneo Taga; Japan	Ali Abdoli; Iran	Yang Jung-mo; South Korea
68 kg	Akira Miyahara; Japan	Jagmander Singh; India	Jahandar Abdolbagher; Iran
74 kg	Mohammad Hossein Mohebbi; Iran	Go Jin-won; South Korea	Rajinder Singh; India
82 kg	Jabbar Mahdioun; Iran	Masaru Motegi; Japan	Wang Yaowei; China
90 kg	Mohammad Hassan Mohebbi; Iran	Budh Singh; India	Akira Suzuki; Japan
100 kg	Yoshiaki Yatsu; Japan	Kartar Singh; India	Alireza Soleimani; Iran
+100 kg	Reza Soukhtehsaraei; Iran	Satpal Singh; India	Muhammad Salahuddin; Pakistan
