= 1988 Asian Wrestling Championships =

1988 Asian Championships
- Host city: Islamabad, Pakistan
- Dates: 12–16 December
- Stadium: Islamabad Sports Complex

Champions
- Freestyle: Iran

The 1988 Asian Wrestling Championships were held in Islamabad, Pakistan. The event took place from December 12 to December 16, 1988.

== Medal table ==
Rank	Nation	Gold	Silver	Bronze	Total
1	Iran	6	1	3	10
2	North Korea	4	2	0	6
3	Japan	0	4	1	5
4	South Korea	0	1	3	4
5	Pakistan	0	1	1	2
6	India	0	1	0	1
7	China	0	0	2	2
Totals (7 entries)		10	10	10	30

== Team ranking ==
Rank	Men's freestyle	
Rank	Team	Points
1	Iran	53
2	North Korea	39
3	Japan	33
4	China	25
5	Pakistan	22

== Medal summary ==
=== Men's freestyle ===
Event	Gold	Silver	Bronze
48 kg	Ri Hak-son; North Korea	Kim Jong-shin; South Korea	Nader Rahmati; Iran
52 kg	Bong Hong-il; North Korea	Taiji Iida; Japan	Ali Akbar Dodangeh; Iran
57 kg	Kim Yong-sik; North Korea	Masaru Yamashita; Japan	Jalil Jahanshahi; Iran
62 kg	Ri Won-il; North Korea	Akbar Fallah; Iran	Ko Young-ho; South Korea
68 kg	Ali Akbarnejad; Iran	Kim Hak-ryong; North Korea	Takahiro Kimura; Japan
74 kg	Behrouz Yari; Iran	Futoshi Shimotamari; Japan	Muhammad Anwar; Pakistan
82 kg	Allahmorad Zarini; Iran	Yu Sang-man; North Korea	Lee Dong-woo; South Korea
90 kg	Mohammad Reza Toupchi; Iran	Toshiyuki Asanuma; Japan	Jam Sujen; China
100 kg	Mehdi Mohebbi; Iran	Subhash Verma; India	Jo Byung-eun; South Korea
130 kg	Alireza Lorestani; Iran	Shahid Pervaiz Butt; Pakistan	Wang Chunguang; China
