= Saeid Ebrahimi =

Iranian wrestler (born 1982)

Medal record

Representing Iran

Men's freestyle wrestling

World Championships
Silver medal – second place	2007 Baku	96 kg

Asian Championships
Gold medal – first place	2005 Wuhan	84 kg
Gold medal – first place	2009 Pattaya	96 kg

Saeid Ebrahimi (Persian: سعید ابراهیمی, born 22 December 1982 in Nahavand) is an Iranian wrestler. He competed in the freestyle heavyweight division the 2008 Summer Olympics in Beijing, reaching the quarter-finals.
