= Reza Soukhtehsaraei =

Iranian wrestler (1950–2025)

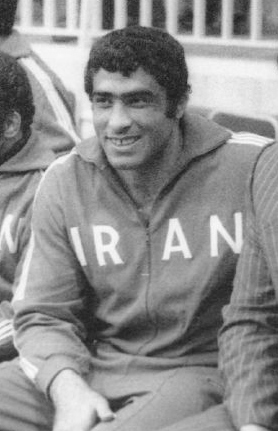

Personal information
- Born: 31 January 1950 Ramian, Iran
- Died: 24 August 2025 (aged 75)
- Height: 190 cm (6 ft 3 in)

Sport
- Sport: Freestyle wrestling, Greco-Roman wrestling, koshti pahlavāni

Achievements and titles
- National finals: Pahlevan of Iran: 1354
Medal record
Representing Iran
Freestyle wrestling
World Championships
Silver medal – second place	1978 Mexico City	+100 kg
Silver medal – second place	1981 Skopje	+100 kg
Asian Games
Gold medal – first place	1982 New Delhi	+100 kg
Gold medal – first place	1990 Beijing	130 kg
Silver medal – second place	1974 Tehran	100 kg
Asian Championships
Gold medal – first place	1979 Jalandhar	+100 kg
Greco-Roman wrestling
Asian Games
Gold medal – first place	1986 Seoul	130 kg

Mohammad-Reza Soukhtehsaraei (Persian: محمدرضا سوخته‌سرايى; 31 January 1950 – 24 August 2025) was an Iranian super-heavyweight wrestler who competed in freestyle and Greco-Roman styles. He was a three-time flag bearer and gold medalist at the 1982, 1986, and 1990 Asian Games. Soukhtehsaraei also won silver medals at the world championships in 1978 and 1981. He was also a Pahlevan of Iran.

Soukhtehsaraei died on 24 August 2025, at the age of 75.
