= Issa Momeni =

Iranian wrestler

Personal information
- Born: 1 January 1968 (age 58)

Sport
- Country: Iran
- Sport: Wrestling
Medal record
Men's freestyle wrestling
Representing Iran
Asian Championships
Gold medal – first place	1995 Manila	74 kg
Bronze medal – third place	1996 Xiaoshan	74 kg
World Cup
Silver medal – second place	1994 Edmonton	74 kg
Golden Grand Prix Ivan Yarygin
Silver medal – second place	1996 Krasnoyarsk	74 kg

Issa Momeni (Persian: عیسی مومنی, born 1 January 1968) is a retired Iranian wrestler. He competed at the 1996 Summer Olympics in Atlanta, in the men's freestyle 74 kg.
