= Oveis Mallah =

Iranian former wrestler (born 1966)

Personal information
- Born: 22 November 1966 (age 59) Now Kandeh, Bandar-e Gaz, Iran

Sport
- Sport: Freestyle wrestling
Medal record
Representing Iran
World Championships
| Bronze medal – third place | 1991 Varna | 57 kg |
Asian Games
| Gold medal – first place | 1990 Beijing | 52 kg |
| Bronze medal – third place | 1994 Hiroshima | 57 kg |
Asian Championships
| Silver medal – second place | 1992 Tehran | 57 kg |
| Silver medal – second place | 1993 Ulaanbaatar | 57 kg |
| Silver medal – second place | 1995 Manila | 57 kg |

Oveis Mallah (born 22 September 1966) is an Iranian former wrestler who competed in the 1992 Summer Olympics.
