= Mohammad Bazmavar =

Iranian freestyle wrestler

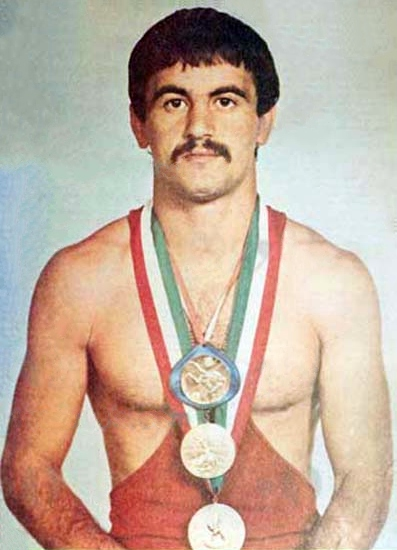
- Bazmavar in 1983

Personal information
- Born: 1953 (age 72–73) tehran

Sport
- Sport: Freestyle wrestling
Medal record
Representing Iran
World Wrestling Championships
| Bronze medal – third place | 1978 Mexico City | -48 kg |
Asian Championships
| Bronze medal – third place | 1981 Lahore | -52 kg |

Mohammad Bazmavar (Persian: محمد بزم‌آور, born 1953) is a retired Iranian freestyle wrestler. He was born in Tehran. He won a bronze medal at the 1978 World Wrestling Championships and placed fourth in 1977 and 1982.
