= Mohammad-Taqi Akbar-Nejad =

Mohammad-Taqi Akbar-Nejad (Persian: محمدتقی اکبرنژاد, born 31 December 1979) is an Iranian Shia cleric and reformist. He was a professor at Qom Seminary, arrested by the Intelligence Organization of the Islamic Revolutionary Guard Corps on 17 February 2024 for criticizing the Islamic Republic of Iran regime and insulting the Supreme Leader of Iran and was taken to an unknown location.
