= Amir Abbas Moradi Ganji =

Iranian wrestler (born 1985)

Medal record

Men's freestyle wrestling

Representing Iran

World Junior Championship
Gold medal – first place	2005 Budapest	96 kg

Asian Championships
Silver medal – second place	2007 Bishkek	96 kg
Silver medal – second place	2008 Jeju City	96 kg

Amir Abbas Moradi Ganji (Persian: امیر عباس مرادی گنجی, born 21 September 1985) is an Iranian wrestler. He is junior world champion in 2005 budapest and two time Asian Championships silver medalist.
