= Reza Andouz =

Iranian wrestler (born 1965)

Personal information
- Born: 31 March 1965 (age 61)

Sport
- Sport: Greco-Roman wrestling
Medal record
Representing Iran
Asian Games
| Silver medal – second place | 1986 Seoul | 74 kg |

Reza Andouz (Persian: رضا اندوز, born 31 March 1965) is a retired Greco-Roman wrestler from Iran. He won a silver medal at the 1986 Asian Games. He also participated at the 1988 Summer Olympics.
