= Ebrahim Mehraban =

Iranian wrestler (born 1972)

Medal record

Men's freestyle wrestling

Representing Iran

Asian Games
Gold medal – first place	1994 Hiroshima	130 kg

Asian Championships
Gold medal – first place	1996 Xiaoshan	130 kg
Gold medal – first place	1997 Tehran	130 kg

Ibrahim Mehraban Roudbaneh (Persian: ابراهیم مهربان; born 11 February 1972) is an Iranian former wrestler who competed in the 1996 Summer Olympics.
