= Fereydoun Ghanbari =

Iranian wrestler (1977–2021)

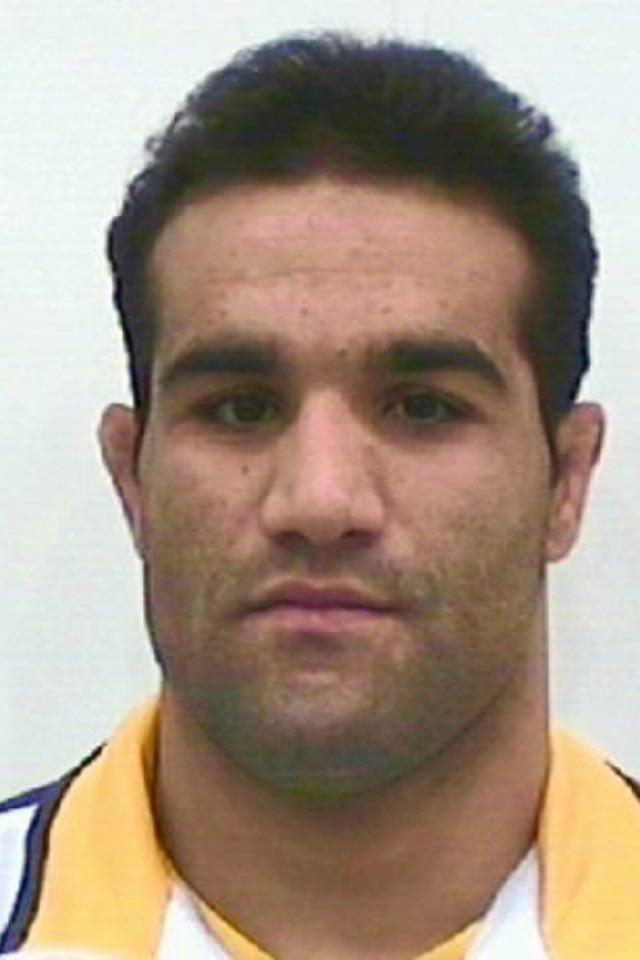

Medal record

Representing Iran

Men's freestyle wrestling

Junior World Championships
Gold medal – first place	1997 Helsinki	83 kg

FILA World Cup
Bronze medal – third place	1998 Stillwater	85 kg
Silver medal – second place	1999 Spokane	85 kg
Bronze medal – third place	2005 Tashkent	84 kg

Asian Championships
Gold medal – first place	2004 Tehran	84 kg

Dan Kolov Cup
Silver medal – second place	1997 Ruse	85 kg

Medved Cup
Bronze medal – third place	2003 Minsk	85 kg

Takhti Cup
Silver medal – second place	1998 Tehran	85 kg
Gold medal – first place	1999 Mazandaran	85 kg
Gold medal – first place	2000 Mashhad	85 kg
Gold medal – first place	2003 Tehran	84 kg

Fereydoun Ghanbari (Persian: فریدون قنبری, 23 September 1977, Kermanshah, Iran – 17 April 2021) was an Iranian wrestler. He won gold medal at the 2004 Asian Wrestling Championships. In 1997 he won the gold medal at Junior World Freestyle Wrestling Championships in Helsinki. He died on the 17 April 2021 due to pancreatitis after some days admitted in hospital.
