= Ebrahim Ghaderi =

Iranian taekwondo practitioner

Medal record

Representing Iran

Men's taekwondo

Asian Games
Gold medal – first place	1986 Seoul	58 kg

Ebrahim Ghaderi (Persian: ابراهیم قادری) is an Iranian Taekwondo athlete who won the first gold medal in Taekwondo for Iran at the Asian Games 1986.
