= Erfan Amiri =

Iranian freestyle wrestler

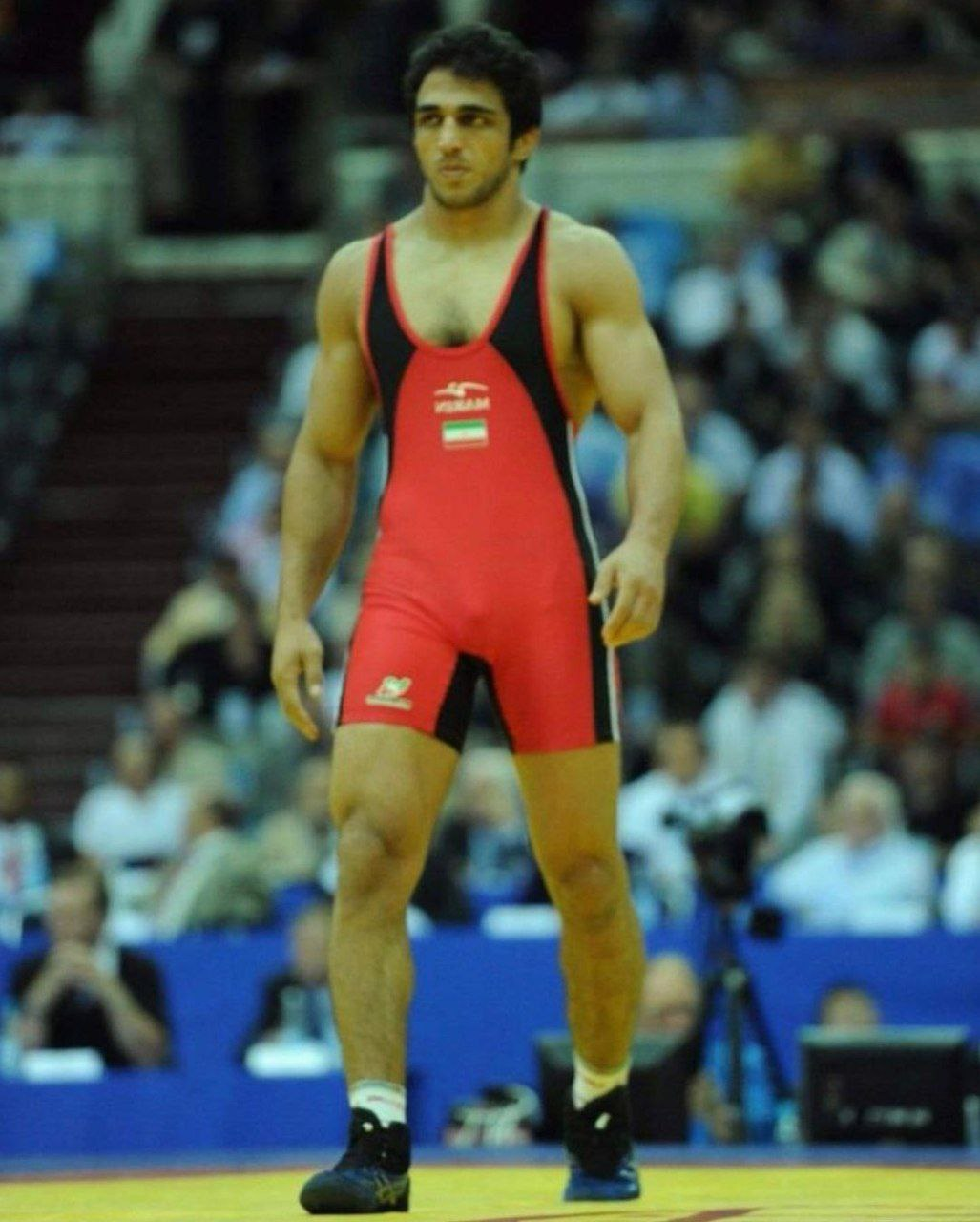

Personal information
- National team: Iran
- Born: 16 March 1990 (age 36) Kermanshah, Iran
- Height: 186 cm (6 ft 1 in)
- Weight: 96 kg (212 lb)
- Website: Instagram: erfanamiri96

Sport
- Country: Iran
- Coached by: Kamran Amiri
Medal record
Representing Iran
Asian Junior Championships
Gold medal – first place	2009 Philippines	96 kg
Gold medal – first place	2010 Huangshan	96 kg
Asian Championships
Silver medal – second place	2011 Tashkent	96 kg
Bronze medal – third place	2012 Gumi	96 kg
Grand Prix of Zilovsky
Bronze medal – third place	2011 Warsaw	96 kg
World Juniors Championships
Gold medal – first place	2009 Ankara	96 kg
Bronze medal – third place	2010 Budapest	96 kg
Asian Youth Championships
Gold medal – first place	2005 Tokyo	76 kg
Gold medal – first place	2006 Thailand	85 kg

Erfan Amiri (Persian: عرفان امیری, born 16 March 1990) is an Iranian freestyle wrestler. In 2005, he won his first Asian Youth Wrestling Championship in Tokyo, Japan, and in the following year, he won the Asian Youth Championships of Thailand 2006. In 2009, he won a gold medal in the Asian championships in the Philippines and a gold medal in the junior world championship in Ankara. He won a World Junior Bronze Medal in Budapest, Hungary in 2010. In the same year, he became a member of the adult Iranian national team and won fifth place at the World Championships in Moscow 2010. In 2011, he won a bronze medal at the Zilowski Grand Prix and a silver medal at the Tashkent Asian Adult championships. In 2012, he won a bronze medal at the Asian Adult championships in Gumi, became the national champion of Iran, and won the Iranian Premier League.
