= Ayoub Baninosrat =

Iranian professional wrestler (born 1968)

Ayyub Baninosrat
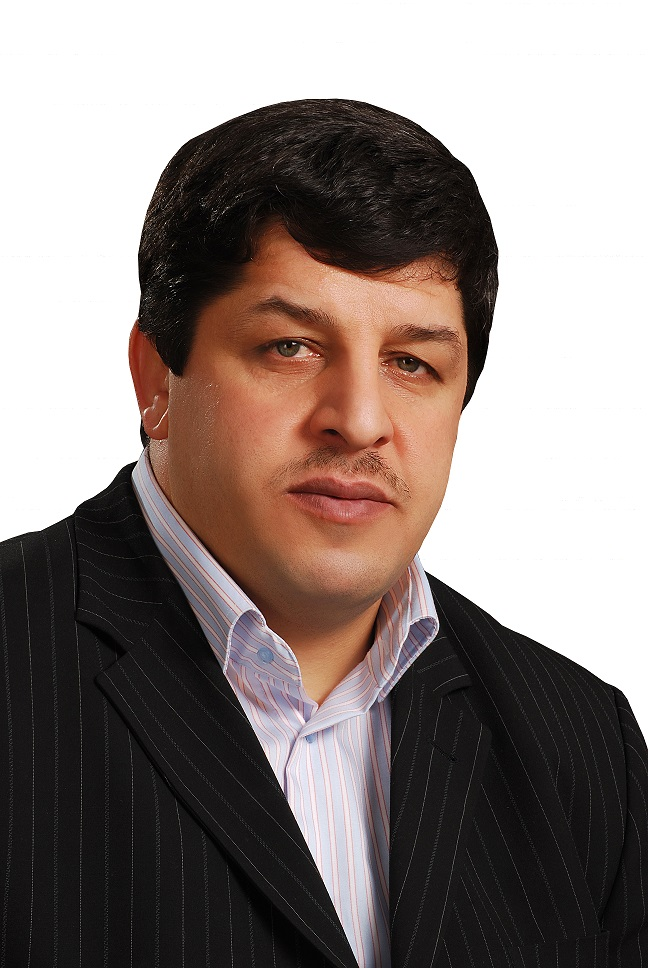

Personal information
- Native name: ایوب بنی نصرت
- Born: January 10, 1968 (age 58) Tabriz, Iran
- Education: MSc. Physical Education
- Height: 176 cm (5 ft 9 in) (2021)
- Weight: 117 kg (258 lb) (2021)

Sport
- Country: Iran
- Sport: Wrestling
- Events: Freestyle wrestling, varzesh-e bastani

Achievements and titles
- National finals: Pahlevan of Iran (2): 1371, 1372
Medal record
Men's freestyle wrestling
Representing Iran
Asian Games
Silver medal – second place	1994 Hiroshima	100 kg
Bronze medal – third place	1990 Beijing	90 kg
Asian Championships
Gold medal – first place	1993 Ulaanbaatar	130 kg

Ayyub Baninosrat (Persian: ایوب بنی‌نصرت is an Iranian wrestler born in Tabriz, East Azerbaijan in Iran.

== Education ==
Baninosrat received his bachelor's degree in physical education at the University of Tabriz and then received a master's degree in physical education management from Urmia University. He received a doctorate in sports management and marketing from Islamic Azad University, but did not continue his education from the second year. He has been a professor in Islamic Azad University of Tabriz for 18 years in physical education.

== Professional sport ==
He entered the wrestling field for the first time in 1982 when he was only 14 years old, motivated by his older brother Davood Baninosrat, and after three years, he reached fourth place in the youth national championship.

Baninosrat became a member of the Iranian national wrestling team in 1990 and won third place at the Beijing Asian Games [2] In the same year. Then, he defeated his powerful opponent, Abbas Jadidi, to advance to the 1992 Barcelona Olympics.

From 1990 to 1996, he was a member of the Iranian national wrestling team in the Olympic, World, Asian, and national wrestling competitions. During this time, he also became Pahlevan of Iran of Iran twice.

Baninosrat wrestled at the 1992 Summer Olympics in Barcelona in 90 kg weight, where he lost 1–0 to Puntsagiin Sükhbat from Mongolia in the first round, but he defeated Iraklis Deskoulidis from Greece in the second round. In the third round, he defeated Tóth from Hungary. Still, he lost to Kenan Şimşek from Turkey, finishing third in his group, and went to Limonta (Cuba) for the fifth title. Baninosrat finished fifth in the Olympics with a 3–1 victory over Limonta.

In the ninth Asian Wrestling Championships(1993) in Ulaanbaatar, Mongolia, he weighed about 100 kg and defeated his opponents in the 130 kg category to win the gold medal.

He won a gold medal in the international competitions of the Takhti Cup in 1371 and 1372, weighing 90 and 100 kg. He also won a bronze medal in the 2nd World University Championships(1996) in the 100 kg weight class.

One of the most significant honors of Ayyub Baninosrat is that he could wear the Pahlavani wrestling armband and become the Pahlevan of Iran for two consecutive years, 1993 & 1994 (1371 & 1372).
