= Nader Rahmati =

Iranian wrestler (born 1966)

Personal information
- Native name: نادر رحمتی
- Nationality: Iranian
- Born: 18 April 1966 (age 60)
- Occupation: Sport

Sport
- Country: Iran
- Sport: Wrestling
- Event: Freestyle
Medal record
Representing Iran
Men's Freestyle wrestling
Asian Games
Gold medal – first place	1994 Hiroshima	48 kg
Asian Championships
Bronze medal – third place	1988 Lahore	48 kg

Nader Rahmati (Persian: نادر رحمتی, born 18 April 1966) is an Iranian former wrestler who competed in the 1992 Summer Olympics.
