= Sobhan Rouhi =

Iranian wrestler (born 1947)

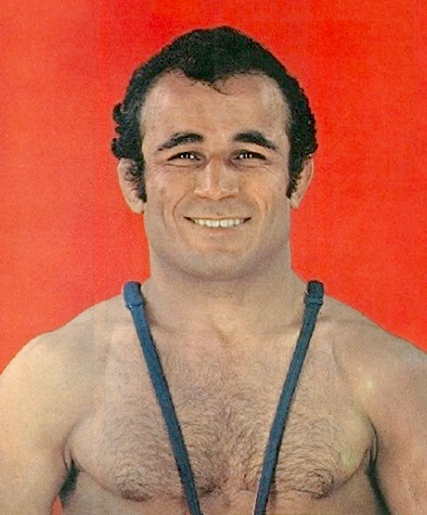

Personal information
- Born: 13 December 1947 (age 78) Juybar, Mazandaran, Iran
- Height: 155 cm (5 ft 1 in)

Sport
- Sport: Freestyle wrestling
Medal record
Representing Iran
Asian Games
Silver medal – second place	1974 Tehran	48 kg
Asian Championships
Bronze medal – third place	1979 Tehran	48 kg

Sobhan Rouhi (Persian: سبحان روحی; born 13 December 1947) is a retired Iranian light-flyweight freestyle wrestler. He won a silver medal at the 1974 Asian Games and competed in the 1976 Summer Olympics. After retiring from competitions Rouhi worked as a wrestling coach.
