= 2011 Asian Wrestling Championships =

- Host city: Tashkent, Uzbekistan
- Dates: 19–22 May 2011
- Stadium: Yunusabad Sports Complex

Champions
- Freestyle: Uzbekistan
- Greco-Roman: Iran
- Women: Japan

The 2011 Asian Wrestling Championships were held in Tashkent, Uzbekistan. The event took place from May 19 to May 22, 2011.

== Medal table ==
Rank	Nation	Gold	Silver	Bronze	Total
1	Iran	5	4	2	11
2	Uzbekistan	4	2	4	10
3	Japan	4	1	3	8
4	Kazakhstan	3	1	5	9
5	China	2	5	2	9
6	North Korea	2	1	4	7
7	Kyrgyzstan	1	0	4	5
8	Mongolia	0	3	8	11
9	South Korea	0	3	4	7
10	India	0	1	2	3
11	Vietnam	0	0	2	2
12	Iraq	0	0	1	1
12	Jordan	0	0	1	1
Totals (13 entries)		21	21	42	84

== Team ranking ==
Rank	Men's freestyle		Men's Greco-Roman		Women's freestyle	
Rank	Team	Points	Team	Points	Team	Points
1	Uzbekistan	51	Iran	65	Japan	62
2	Iran	49	Uzbekistan	50	China	56
3	Mongolia	48	South Korea	49	Mongolia	55
4	Kazakhstan	43	Kyrgyzstan	45	Kazakhstan	42
5	North Korea	34	Kazakhstan	43	North Korea	33
6	China	34	China	38	Kyrgyzstan	28
7	South Korea	29	Japan	27	India	27
8	Kyrgyzstan	29	India	23	Vietnam	26
9	Japan	27	Jordan	14	Uzbekistan	15
10	India	23	Iraq	10	South Korea	14

== Medal summary ==
=== Men's freestyle ===
Event	Gold	Silver	Bronze
55 kg	Yang Kyong-il; North Korea	Yasuhiro Inaba; Japan	Lee Woo-joo; South Korea
55 kg	Yang Kyong-il; North Korea	Yasuhiro Inaba; Japan	Rahul Aware; India
60 kg	Dauren Zhumagaziyev; Kazakhstan	Mostafa Aghajani; Iran	Batsaikhany Nemekhbayar; Mongolia
60 kg	Dauren Zhumagaziyev; Kazakhstan	Mostafa Aghajani; Iran	Ri Jong-myong; North Korea
66 kg	Yang Chun-song; North Korea	Ikhtiyor Navruzov; Uzbekistan	Batchuluuny Ankhbayar; Mongolia
66 kg	Yang Chun-song; North Korea	Ikhtiyor Navruzov; Uzbekistan	Innokenti Innokentev; Kyrgyzstan
74 kg	Rashid Kurbanov; Uzbekistan	Zhang Chongyao; China	Lee Yun-seok; South Korea
74 kg	Rashid Kurbanov; Uzbekistan	Zhang Chongyao; China	Pürevjavyn Önörbat; Mongolia
84 kg	Ehsan Amini; Iran	Kanat Berdiyev; Kazakhstan	Aibek Usupov; Kyrgyzstan
84 kg	Ehsan Amini; Iran	Kanat Berdiyev; Kazakhstan	Zaurbek Sokhiev; Uzbekistan
96 kg	Kurban Kurbanov; Uzbekistan	Erfan Amiri; Iran	Natsagsürengiin Zolboo; Mongolia
96 kg	Kurban Kurbanov; Uzbekistan	Erfan Amiri; Iran	Daulet Shabanbay; Kazakhstan
120 kg	Artur Taymazov; Uzbekistan	Komeil Ghasemi; Iran	Deng Zhiwei; China
120 kg	Artur Taymazov; Uzbekistan	Komeil Ghasemi; Iran	Jargalsaikhany Chuluunbat; Mongolia

=== Men's Greco-Roman ===
Event	Gold	Silver	Bronze
55 kg	Arsen Eraliev; Kyrgyzstan	Ildar Hafizov; Uzbekistan	Mohsen Hajipour; Iran
55 kg	Arsen Eraliev; Kyrgyzstan	Ildar Hafizov; Uzbekistan	Lee Jung-baik; South Korea
60 kg	Almat Kebispayev; Kazakhstan	Anil Kumar; India	Abdolmohammad Papi; Iran
60 kg	Almat Kebispayev; Kazakhstan	Anil Kumar; India	Dilshod Aripov; Uzbekistan
66 kg	Ali Mohammadi; Iran	Kim Min-chul; South Korea	Beibit Nugumanov; Kazakhstan
66 kg	Ali Mohammadi; Iran	Kim Min-chul; South Korea	Hiroyuki Shimizu; Japan
74 kg	Mohsen Ghasemi; Iran	Kim Jin-hyeok; South Korea	Askhat Dilmukhamedov; Kazakhstan
74 kg	Mohsen Ghasemi; Iran	Kim Jin-hyeok; South Korea	Azizbek Murodov; Uzbekistan
84 kg	Davoud Akhbari; Iran	Cho Hyo-chul; South Korea	Duan Ning; China
84 kg	Davoud Akhbari; Iran	Cho Hyo-chul; South Korea	Rustam Sultonov; Uzbekistan
96 kg	Evgeniy Achkasov; Uzbekistan	Davoud Gilneirang; Iran	An Chang-gun; South Korea
96 kg	Evgeniy Achkasov; Uzbekistan	Davoud Gilneirang; Iran	Yahia Abutabeekh; Jordan
120 kg	Bashir Babajanzadeh; Iran	Meng Qiang; China	Ali Nadhim; Iraq
120 kg	Bashir Babajanzadeh; Iran	Meng Qiang; China	Murat Ramonov; Kyrgyzstan

=== Women's freestyle ===
Event	Gold	Silver	Bronze
48 kg	Sun Yanan; China	Tsogtbazaryn Enkhjargal; Mongolia	So Sim-hyang; North Korea
48 kg	Sun Yanan; China	Tsogtbazaryn Enkhjargal; Mongolia	Mikhrniso Nurmatova; Kyrgyzstan
51 kg	Zhao Shasha; China	Davaasükhiin Otgontsetseg; Mongolia	Han Kum-ok; North Korea
51 kg	Zhao Shasha; China	Davaasükhiin Otgontsetseg; Mongolia	Hikari Sugawara; Japan
55 kg	Chikako Matsukawa; Japan	Yang Chen; China	Choe Jong-bok; North Korea
55 kg	Chikako Matsukawa; Japan	Yang Chen; China	Aiyim Abdildina; Kazakhstan
59 kg	Takako Saito; Japan	Liu Gui; China	Sükheegiin Tserenchimed; Mongolia
59 kg	Takako Saito; Japan	Liu Gui; China	Dương Thị Lan; Vietnam
63 kg	Kaori Icho; Japan	Kim Ran-mi; North Korea	Lương Thị Quyên; Vietnam
63 kg	Kaori Icho; Japan	Kim Ran-mi; North Korea	Sharkhüügiin Tümentsetseg; Mongolia
67 kg	Yoshiko Inoue; Japan	Tsedendorjiin Bayarzayaa; Mongolia	Tatyana Zakharova; Kazakhstan
67 kg	Yoshiko Inoue; Japan	Tsedendorjiin Bayarzayaa; Mongolia	Navjot Kaur; India
72 kg	Guzel Manyurova; Kazakhstan	Wang Jiao; China	Kyoko Hamaguchi; Japan
72 kg	Guzel Manyurova; Kazakhstan	Wang Jiao; China	Badrakhyn Odonchimeg; Mongolia

== Participating nations ==
234 competitors from 21 nations competed.

- China (21)
- Chinese Taipei (5)
- India (19)
- Iran (14)
- Iraq (9)
- Japan (21)
- Jordan (3)
- Kazakhstan (21)
- Kyrgyzstan (20)
- Mongolia (14)
- North Korea (11)
- Philippines (2)
- Qatar (2)
- South Korea (17)
- Syria (7)
- Tajikistan (14)
- Thailand (3)
- Turkmenistan (2)
- United Arab Emirates (1)
- Uzbekistan (20)
- Vietnam (8)
