= Mohammad Farhangdoust =

Iranian freestyle wrestler

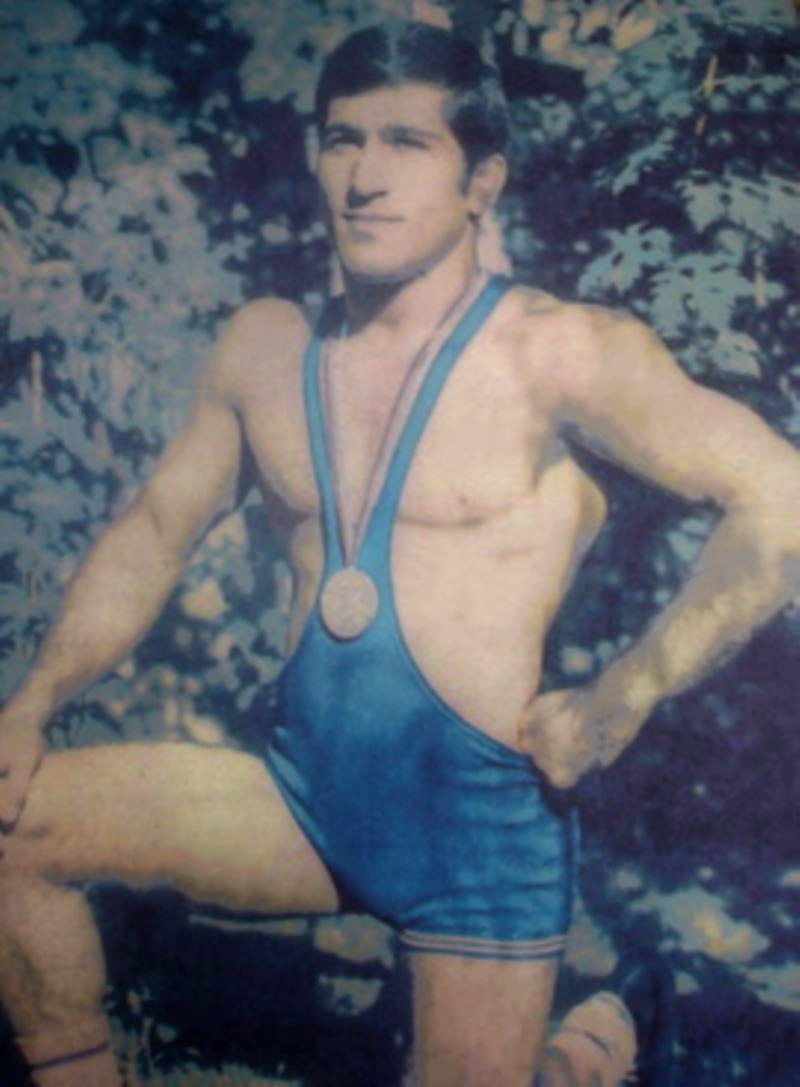

Personal information
- Born: 1946 Rasht, Iran
- Died: 2012 (aged 66) Canada

Sport
- Sport: Freestyle wrestling
Medal record
Representing Iran
FILA Wrestling World Championships
Silver medal – second place	1970 Edmonton	-74 kg
Silver medal – second place	1971 Sofia	-74 kg
Asian Games
Silver medal – second place	1970 Bangkok	-74 kg

Mohammad Farhangdoust (Persian: محمد فرهنگدوست, 1946–2012) was an Iranian freestyle wrestler. He won silver medals at the 1970 and 1971 World Championships and 1970 Asian Games. He retired in 1972 after an injury sustained in a tournament. In his last years he battled with cancer, and underwent treatment in Germany and Canada. He died in Canada aged 66.

At the 1970 Asian Games he received silver medal in the 74 kg event after losing to Toshitada Yoshida.

At the 1970 World Championships in the 74 kg event Mohammad Farhangdoust won silver medal without the match against gold medalist Wayne Wells.

At the 1971 World Championships Mohammad Farhangdoust initially received bronze medal in the 74 kg event. In the final standings, a judging dispute downgraded his silver to bronze in favor of Ludovic Ambruş, sparking widespread debate over scoring and fairness; however, the FILA (now UWW) officially corrected this to silver in 2011, recognizing Farhangdoust's rightful achievement.

He also was multiple Iranian National Champion.

He is known for his victories against Daniel Robin, Adolf Seger, Ruslan Ashuraliev, Mansour Barzegar.
