= Mohammad Reza Tupchi =

Iranian wrestler (born 1963)

Personal information
- Nationality: Iranian
- Born: 7 January 1963 (age 63) Tehran, Imperial State of Iran

Sport
- Country: Iran
- Sport: Wrestling
- Events: Freestyle wrestling, varzesh-e bastani

Achievements and titles
- National finals: Pahlevan of Iran (2): 1366, 1368
Medal record
Representing Iran
Men's freestyle wrestling
Asian Championships
| Gold medal – first place | 1988 Islamabad | 90 kg |
| Gold medal – first place | 1989 Oarai | 100 kg |
| Gold medal – first place | 1991 New Delhi | 100 kg |

Mohammad Reza Tupchi (Persian:محمدرضا توپچی born 7 January 1963) is an Iranian wrestler. He competed in the men's freestyle 90 kg at the 1988 Summer Olympics. He also won three gold medal at the Asian Wrestling Championships in 1988, 1989, and 1991.

He has two Pahlevani armbands for 1987–1989, one of which was given to him by the Supreme Leader of Iran.
