= Ehsan Amini =

Iranian wrestler

Ehsan Amini palangani, born 27 March 1986, Eslamabad-e Gharb, Iran) is an Iranian wrestler. He won gold at the 2011 Asian Wrestling Championships.

== Sources ==
- Profile
