= Aboutaleb Talebi =

Iranian wrestler (1945–2008)

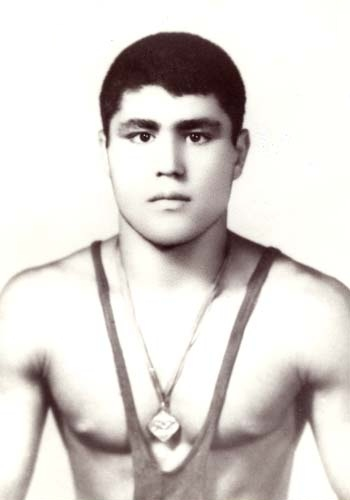

Personal information
- Born: 10 April 1945 Marand, Imperial State of Iran
- Died: 21 July 2008 (aged 63) Tehran, Iran
- Height: 160 cm (5 ft 3 in)

Sport
- Sport: Freestyle wrestling
Medal record
Representing Iran
Olympic Games
| Bronze medal – third place | 1968 Mexico | 57 kg |
World Championships
| Bronze medal – third place | 1966 Toledo | 57 kg |
| Bronze medal – third place | 1967 New Delhi | 57 kg |
| Bronze medal – third place | 1969 Mar del Plata | 57 kg |

Aboutaleb Talebi Gargari (Persian: ابوطالب طالبی گرگری; 10 April 1945 – 21 July 2008) was an Iranian bantamweight freestyle wrestler. He won bronze medals at the 1966, 1967 and 1969 world championships and 1968 Summer Olympics.

Talebi lost his father to a sudden disease at the age of 11, and started working at a carpet shop next year to help his family. He married in 1968 and had four children.
