= Abolfazl Anvari =

Iranian wrestler (1938–2018)

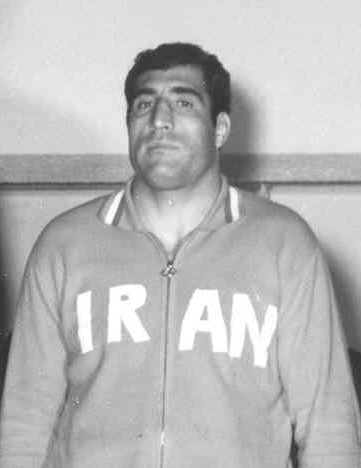

Personal information
- Born: 9 February 1938 Saveh, Iran
- Died: 14 February 2018 (aged 80) Tehran, Iran
- Height: 195 cm (6 ft 5 in)
- Weight: 105 kg (231 lb)

Sport
- Sport: Freestyle wrestling
Medal record
Representing Iran
World Wrestling Championships
Bronze medal – third place	1966 Toledo	+97 kg
Bronze medal – third place	1969 Mar del Plata	+100
Asian Games
Bronze medal – third place	1970 Bangkok	-100 kg

Abolfazl Anvari (Persian: ابوالفضل انورى, 9 February 1938 – 14 February 2018) was an Iranian heavyweight freestyle wrestler. He won bronze medals at the 1966 and 1969 World Championships and at the 1970 Asian Games. He placed fourth at the 1967 World Championships and sixth at the 1968 Summer Olympics.

Olympic Games
Preceded by Nosratollah Shahmir	Flagbearer for Iran; Mexico City 1968	Succeeded by Moslem Eskandar-Filabi
