= Muhammad Salahuddin =

Pakistani wrestler (born 1948)

Personal information
- Nationality: Pakistani
- Born: 8 September 1948 (age 77)

Sport
- Sport: Wrestling
Medal record
Men's freestyle wrestling
Representing Pakistan
Asian Games
Bronze medal – third place	1978 Bangkok	100 kg

Muhammad Salahuddin (born on 8 September 1948) is a Pakistani former wrestler. He competed in the men's freestyle 90 kg event at the 1976 Summer Olympics. At the 1978 Asian Games he won a bronze medal in the same weight division.
