= Mohammad Hossein Mohebbi =

Iranian wrestler (born 1956)

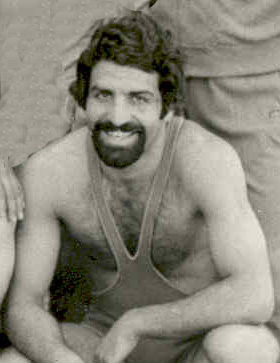

Personal information
- Born: September 6, 1956 (age 69)
- Height: 182 cm (6 ft 0 in)

Sport
- Sport: Freestyle wrestling
Medal record
Representing Iran
World Championships
Silver medal – second place	1978 Mexico City	74 kg
Asian Games
Gold medal – first place	1982 New Delhi	74 kg
Bronze medal – third place	1986 Seoul	82 kg
Asian Wrestling Championships
Gold medal – first place	1979 Jalandhar	74 kg
Gold medal – first place	1981 Lahore	74 kg
Gold medal – first place	1983 Tehran	82 kg
Gold medal – first place	1987 Mumbai	82 kg
Bronze medal – third place	1989 Oarai	82 kg

Mohammad Hossein Mohebbi (Persian: محمد‌حسین محبی; born September 6, 1956) was captain of Iran's freestyle wrestling national team. He won a silver medal at the 1978 World Championships and a gold at the 1982 Asian Games. He is frequently confused with his twin brother Mohammad Hassan Mohebbi (Persian: محمد‌حسن محبی), who competed alongside, but in a heavier category (90 kg).
