= Ali Hajiloo =

Iranian wrestler (born 1946)

Personal information
- Nationality: Iranian
- Born: 23 March 1946 (age 80) Ardabil, Iran

Sport
- Sport: Wrestling
Medal record
Representing Iran
Asian Games
Silver medal – second place	1970 Bangkok	82 kg

Ali Hajiloo (Persian: علی حاجیلو, born 23 March 1946) is an Iranian wrestler. He competed in the men's freestyle 82 kg at the 1972 Summer Olympics.

He also participated three times at the World Wrestling Championships from 1970 to 1973 and failed to win a medal but he won a silver medal at the 1970 Asian Games in Thailand.
