= Nasser Zeinalnia =

Iranian wrestler

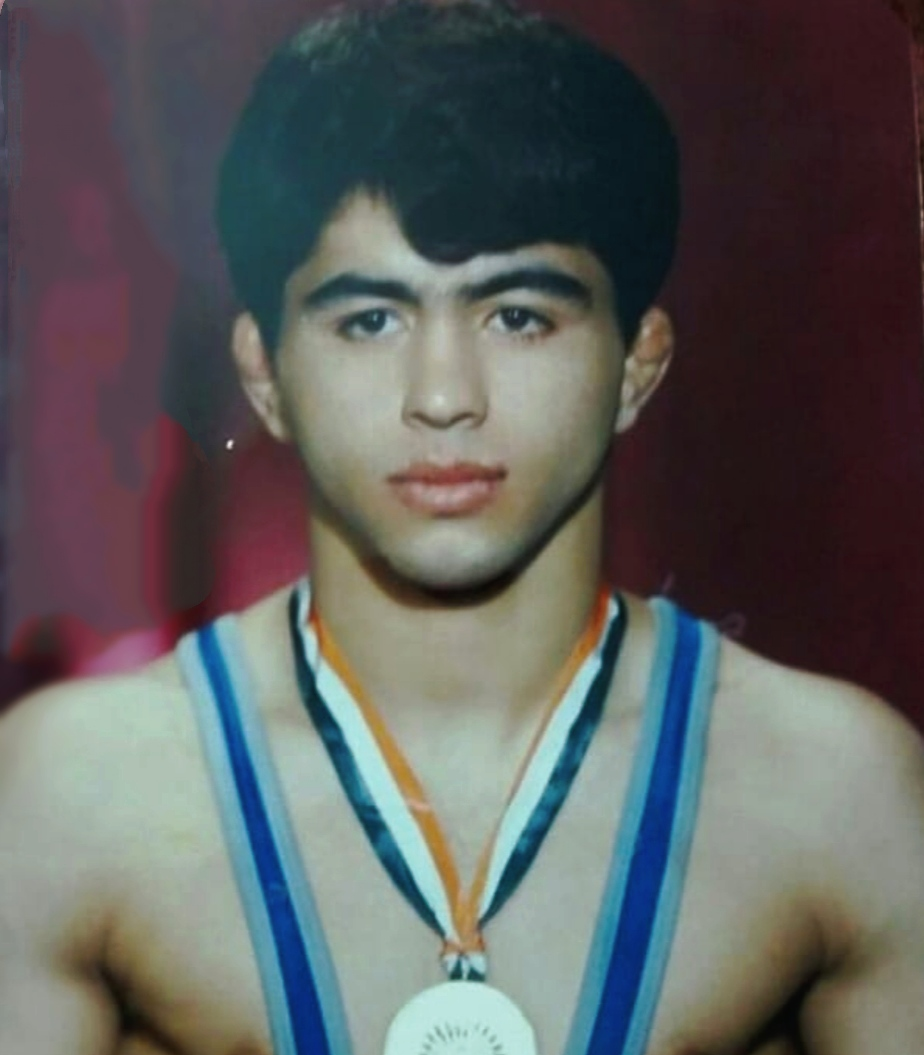

Personal information
- Nationality: Iranian
- Born: 6 September 1970 (age 55) Mashhad, Iran

Sport
- Sport: Wrestling

Nasser Zeinalnia (Persian: ناصر زینل‌نیا; born 6 September 1970) is an Iranian wrestler. He competed in the men's freestyle 48 kg at the 1988 Summer Olympics.
