= Majid Torkan =

Iranian wrestler (born 1964)

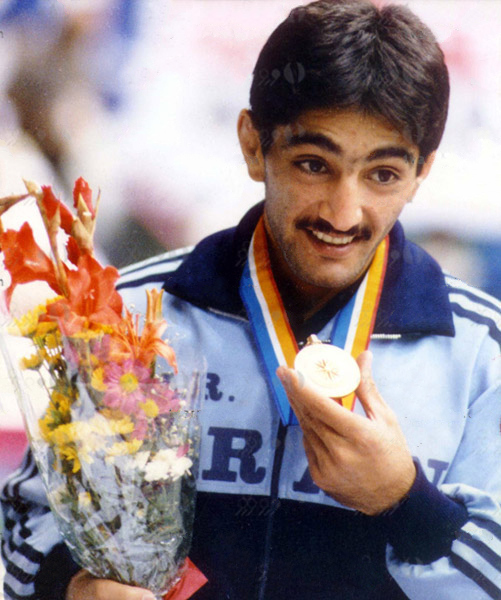
- Torkan at the 1986 Asian Games

Personal information
- Born: 15 November 1964 (age 61) Sari, Imperial State of Iran
- Height: 164 cm (5 ft 5 in)

Sport
- Sport: Freestyle wrestling
Medal record
Representing Iran
World Championships
Gold medal – first place	1990 Tokyo	52 kg
Silver medal – second place	1985 Budapest	48 kg
Bronze medal – third place	1989 Martigny	52 kg
Asian Games
Gold medal – first place	1986 Seoul	48 kg
Asian Championships
Gold medal – first place	1983 Tehran	48 kg
Gold medal – first place	1989 Oarai	52 kg
Gold medal – first place	1991 New Delhi	52 kg
Silver medal – second place	1992 Tehran	52 kg

Majid Torkan (Persian: مجيد تركان, born 15 November 1964) is a retired Iranian freestyle wrestler. He won a world title in 1990, placing second in 1985 and third in 1989. He also won gold medals at the Asian Games in 1986 and at the Asian Championships in 1983, 1989 and 1991. He competed at the 1988 and 1992 Olympics and placed seventh in 1992.
