= Hamid Tavakkol =

Iranian freestyle wrestler

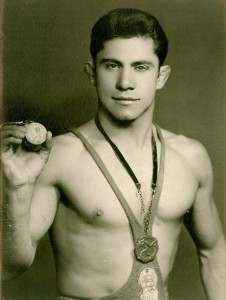

Personal information
- Born: 25 October 1933 (age 92) Lotfabad, Iran

Sport
- Sport: Freestyle wrestling
Medal record
Representing Iran
FILA Wrestling World Championships
Bronze medal – third place	1961 Yokohama	-62 kg

Hamid Tavakkol (Persian: حمید توکل, born 25 October 1933) is a retired Iranian freestyle wrestler who won a bronze medal at the 1961 World Championships.

Tavakol graduated in French Literature from the University of Tehran and can communicate in French, English and Turkish. After retiring from competitions he had a long career as a sports administrator. He is married and has four children. He lives in Mashhad.
