= Nasrollah Soltaninejad =

Iranian freestyle wrestler

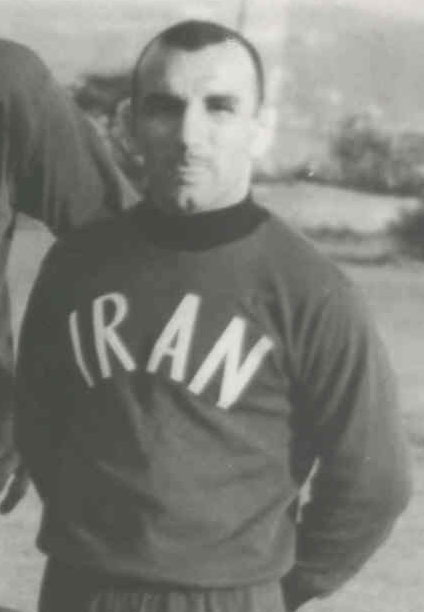

Personal information
- Nationality: Iranian
- Born: 1936 Qom, Iran
- Died: 19 September 1976 (aged 39–40) Tehran, Iran

Sport
- Country: Iran
- Sport: Wrestling
- Event: Freestyle
Medal record
Representing Iran
World Wrestling Championships
Silver medal – second place	1961 Yokohama	-52 kg

Nasrollah Soltaninejad (Persian: نصرالله سلطانی‌نژاد) was an Iranian freestyle wrestler. He won a silver medal at the 1961 World Championships.
