= Hossein Tahami =

Iranian wrestler

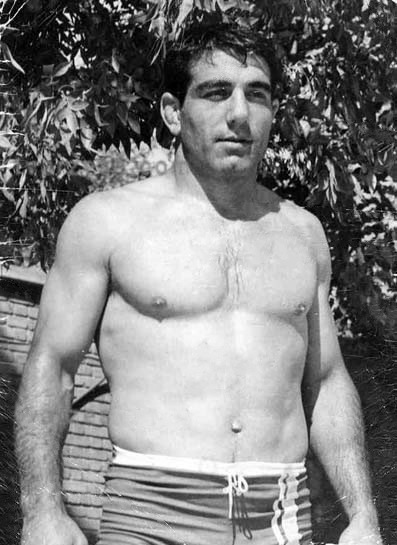

Personal information
- Born: 1942/1943
- Died: 2007

Sport
- Sport: Freestyle wrestling
Medal record
Representing Iran
Asian Games
Silver medal – second place	1966 Bangkok	78 kg
World Wrestling Championships
Bronze medal – third place	1966 Toledo	-78 kg

Hossein Tahami (Persian: حسین تهامی; 1942/1943 – 2007) was an Iranian retired freestyle wrestler. He won a bronze medal at the 1966 World Championships.

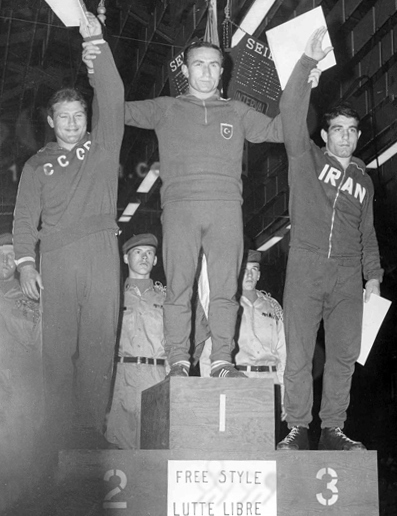
Hossein Tahami (right) at 1966 World Wrestling Championships.
