= Kazem Gholami =

Iranian wrestler (born 1957)

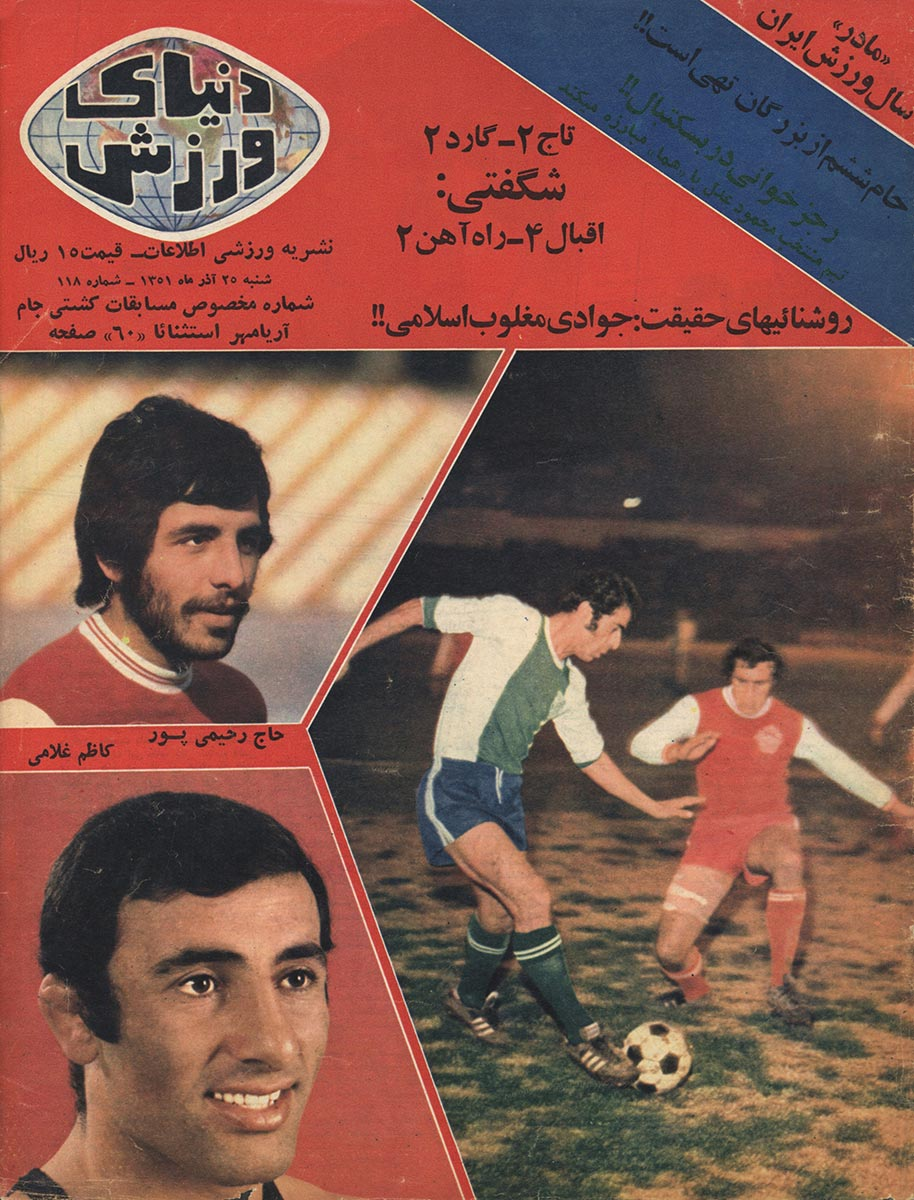
- Kazem Gholami at the left bottom corner of Donyaye Varzesh Magazine cover in 1972

Personal information
- Nationality: Iranian
- Born: 21 March 1957 (age 69)

Sport
- Sport: Wrestling
Medal record
Men's freestyle wrestling
Representing Iran
Asian Games
| Bronze medal – third place | 1986 Seoul | 100 kg |
Asian Championships
| Gold medal – first place | 1992 Tehran | 100 kg |

Kazem Gholami (Persian: کاظم غلامی, born 21 March 1957) is an Iranian wrestler. He competed in the men's freestyle 100 kg at the 1992 Summer Olympics, finishing 9th.

== Personal life ==
On 29 January 2026, Gholami signed a letter from the People's Mojahedin Organization of Iran calling for protests from Iranian diaspora in Berlin in solidarity with the 2025–2026 Iranian protests.
