= Akbar Fallah =

Iranian wrestler (born 1966)

Personal information
- Nationality: Iranian
- Born: 4 September 1966 (age 59) Tehran, Iran

Sport
- Sport: Wrestling
Medal record
Men's freestyle wrestling
Representing Iran
World Championships
Gold medal – first place	1993 Toronto	68 kg
Silver medal – second place	1995 Atlanta	68 kg
Asian Games
Bronze medal – third place	1986 Seoul	62 kg
Asian Championships
Silver medal – second place	1988 Islamabad	62 kg
Silver medal – second place	1992 Tehran	68 kg

Akbar Fallah (Persian: اکبر فلاح, born 4 September 1966) is an Iranian wrestler. He competed at the 1988 Summer Olympics and the 1996 Summer Olympics.
