= 1966 World Wrestling Championships =

- Host city: Toledo, United States
- Dates: 16–22 June 1966

Champions
- Freestyle: Turkey
- Greco-Roman: Soviet Union

The 1966 World Wrestling Championships were held in Toledo, Ohio, United States from 16 to 22 June 1966.

== Medal table ==
Rank	Nation	Gold	Silver	Bronze	Total
1	Soviet Union	6	5	0	11
2	Bulgaria	3	0	1	4
3	Turkey	1	4	3	8
4	Japan	1	3	0	4
5	Iran	1	0	4	5
6	West Germany	1	0	2	3
7	Hungary	1	0	0	1
7	South Korea	1	0	0	1
7	Yugoslavia	1	0	0	1
10	United States	0	2	1	3
11	Romania	0	1	1	2
12	Sweden	0	1	0	1
13	Czechoslovakia	0	0	2	2
14	Austria	0	0	1	1
14	Finland	0	0	1	1
Totals (15 entries)		16	16	16	48

== Team ranking ==
Rank	Men's freestyle		Men's Greco-Roman	
Rank	Team	Points	Team	Points
1	Turkey	34	Soviet Union	39.5
2	Soviet Union	28.5	Bulgaria	19.33
3	United States	23	Romania	14.5
4	Iran	19	West Germany	14
5	Bulgaria	18.5	Finland	12.5
6	Japan	17	Turkey	12.33

== Medal summary ==
=== Freestyle ===
Event	Gold	Silver	Bronze
Flyweight; 52 kg	Chang Chang-sun; South Korea	Yasuo Katsumura; Japan	Rick Sanders; United States
Bantamweight; 57 kg	Ali Aliev; Soviet Union	Hasan Sevinç; Turkey	Aboutaleb Talebi; Iran
Featherweight; 63 kg	Masaaki Kaneko; Japan	Bobby Douglas; United States	Nihat Kabanlı; Turkey
Lightweight; 70 kg	Abdollah Movahed; Iran	Iwao Horiuchi; Japan	Seyit Ahmet Ağralı; Turkey
Welterweight; 78 kg	Mahmut Atalay; Turkey	Guram Sagaradze; Soviet Union	Hossein Tahami; Iran
Middleweight; 87 kg	Prodan Gardzhev; Bulgaria	Hasan Güngör; Turkey	Josef Urban; Czechoslovakia
Light heavyweight 97 kg	Aleksandr Medved; Soviet Union	Ahmet Ayık; Turkey	Said Mustafov; Bulgaria
Heavyweight +97 kg	Aleksandr Ivanitsky; Soviet Union	Larry Kristoff; United States	Abolfazl Anvari; Iran

=== Greco-Roman ===
Event	Gold	Silver	Bronze
Flyweight; 52 kg	Angel Kerezov; Bulgaria	Sergey Rybalko; Soviet Union	Rolf Lacour; West Germany
Bantamweight; 57 kg	Fritz Stange; West Germany	Koji Sakurama; Japan	Ünver Beşergil; Turkey
Featherweight; 63 kg	Roman Rurua; Soviet Union	Leif Freij; Sweden	Iraj Khorshidfar; Iran
Lightweight; 70 kg	Stevan Horvat; Yugoslavia	Gennady Sapunov; Soviet Union	Eero Tapio; Finland
Welterweight; 78 kg	Viktor Igumenov; Soviet Union	Florin Ciorcilă; Romania	Peter Nettekoven; West Germany
Middleweight; 87 kg	Valentin Olenik; Soviet Union	Tevfik Kış; Turkey	Franz Pötsch; Austria
Light heavyweight 97 kg	Boyan Radev; Bulgaria	Valery Anisimov; Soviet Union	Nicolae Martinescu; Romania
Heavyweight +97 kg	István Kozma; Hungary	Nikolay Shmakov; Soviet Union	Petr Kment; Czechoslovakia
