= Alireza Soleimani =

Iranian wrestler (1956–2014)

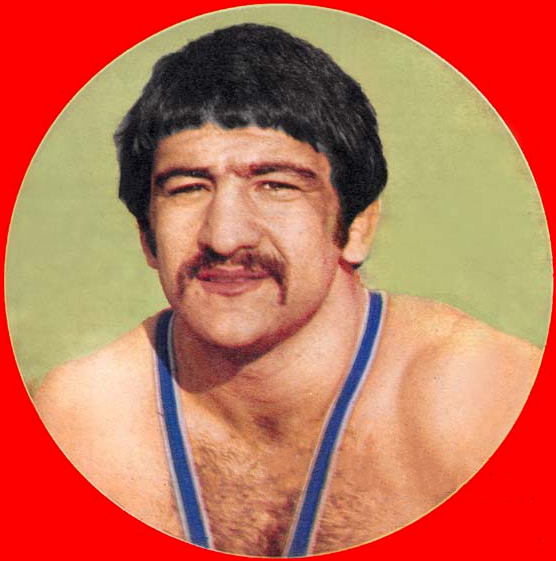

Personal information
- Born: 2 February 1956 Tehran, Imperial State of Iran
- Died: 21 May 2014 (aged 58) Tehran, Iran
- Height: 190 cm (6 ft 3 in)

Sport
- Sport: Freestyle wrestling, varzesh-e bastani

Achievements and titles
- National finals: Pahlevan of Iran (6): 1358, 1361, 1362, 1364, 1365, 1369
Medal record
Representing Iran
World Championships
Gold medal – first place	1989 Martigny	130 kg
Asian Games
Gold medal – first place	1986 Seoul	130 kg
Asian Championships
Gold medal – first place	1981 Lahore	+100 kg
Gold medal – first place	1983 Tehran	130 kg
Gold medal – first place	1987 Mumbai	130 kg
Gold medal – first place	1989 Oarai	130 kg
Gold medal – first place	1991 New Delhi	130 kg
Bronze medal – third place	1979 Jalandhar	+100 kg

Alireza Soleimani Karbalaei (Persian: علیرضا سلیمانی کربلایی, 2 February 1956 – 21 May 2014) was an Iranian heavyweight freestyle wrestler. He was the first Iranian to win the world superheavyweight title, which he achieved in 1989. He served as the flag bearer for Iran at the 1992 Summer Olympics, where he placed sixth.

Besides freestyle wrestling, Soleimani was a champion in varzesh-e bastani and won the Pahlevan of Iran title and armband in pahlevani traditional wrestling six times.

Olympic Games
Preceded by Hassan Zahedi	Flagbearer for Iran; Barcelona 1992	Succeeded by Lida Fariman
