= Hashem Kolahi =

Iranian wrestler (1956–2024)

Personal information
- Native name: هاشم کلاهی
- Nationality: Iranian
- Born: 22 April 1956
- Died: 13 November 2024 (aged 68)

Sport
- Sport: Wrestling

Hashem Kolahi (Persian: هاشم کلاهی; 22 April 1956 – 13 November 2024) was an Iranian wrestler. He competed in the men's Greco-Roman 90 kg at the 1976 Summer Olympics.

Kolahi died on 13 November 2024, at the age of 68.
