= Mansour Barzegar =

Iranian freestyle wrestler

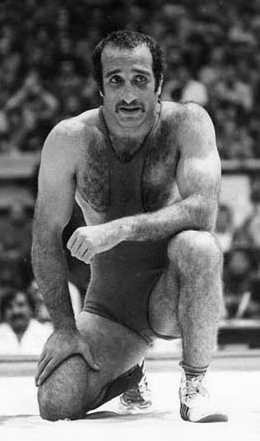
- Barzegar in 1979

Personal information
- Born: 28 February 1947 (age 79) Tehran, Imperial State of Iran
- Height: 178 cm (5 ft 10 in)

Sport
- Sport: Freestyle wrestling
Medal record
Representing Iran
Olympic Games
Silver medal – second place	1976 Montreal	74 kg
World Championships
Gold medal – first place	1973 Tehran	74 kg
Silver medal – second place	1975 Minsk	74 kg
Silver medal – second place	1977 Lausanne	74 kg
Asian Games
Gold medal – first place	1974 Tehran	74 kg

Mansour Barzegar (Persian: منصور برزگر; born 28 February 1947) is a retired Iranian welterweight freestyle wrestler. He competed at the 1972 and 1976 Olympics and placed fifth and second, respectively. At the world championships he won one gold and two silver medals between 1973 and 1977.

Barzegar was born as the fifth boy in a large sporting family, he also had one sister. He lost his father at the age of 6, and was included into the national wrestling team aged 24. He was seriously injured in the final of the 1975 World Championships, when he lost to his long-time rival Ruslan Ashuraliev, but recovered by the 1976 Olympics to win another silver medal. Barzegar retired from competitions at the 1979 World Championships and then had a long career as a national wrestling coach.
