= Mohammad Hassan Mohebbi =

Iranian wrestler (born 1956)

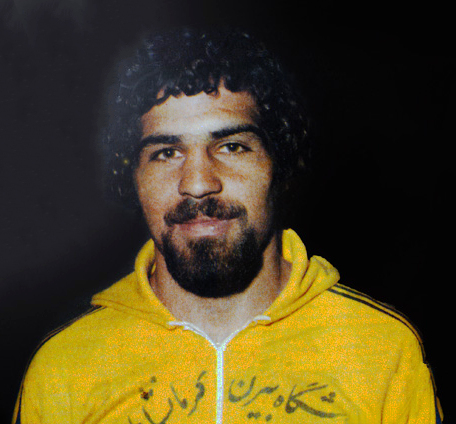
- Mohammad Hassan Mohebbi

Personal information
- Born: 6 September 1956 (age 69) Kermanshah, Iran

Sport
- Sport: Freestyle wrestling, varzesh-e bastani

Achievements and titles
- National finals: Pahlevan of Iran (2): 1363, 1367
Medal record
Representing Iran
World Championships
Disqualified	1985 Budapest	90 kg
Bronze medal – third place	1990 Tokyo	90 kg
Asian Games
Gold medal – first place	1982 New Delhi	90 kg
Silver medal – second place	1986 Seoul	90 kg
Asian Championships
Gold medal – first place	1979 Jalandhar	90 kg
Gold medal – first place	1981 Lahore	90 kg
Gold medal – first place	1983 Tehran	90 kg
Gold medal – first place	1987 Mumbai	90 kg
Gold medal – first place	1989 Oarai	90 kg

Mohammad Hassan "Homa" Mohebbi (Persian: محمد حسن محبی, born 6 September 1956) is an Iranian light heavyweight freestyle wrestler from Kermanshah. He is often confused with his twin brother Mohammad Hossein Mohebbi, who competed in lighter categories (74 or 82 kg).

He won one silver and one bronze medal at the World Championships, with the silver medal being stripped over what was considered unsportsmanlike behaviour, which was essentially Mohebbi being forced by the Iranian team officials to step down from the podium when the US anthem was played. He was also a two-time Pahlevan of Iran.

Like many of his fellow Iranian wrestlers in the 1980s, his sport career suffered on account of political influences of the Iran's sport organizations at that time. Iran boycotted the Olympic Games in 1980 and 1984, and did not participate at the Wrestling World Championships in 1979, 1983, 1986, and 1987.

== Sensation at World Championship 1985 ==
At the 1985 World Championship in Budapest, Mohebbi lost against the American William Scherr in the final and won the silver medal, but he was forced by the Iranian team officials to step down from the podium in order not to stand at attention for the US anthem and flag. The FILA executive board stripped him of his medal after ruling Mohebbi's action was disrespectful towards other medalists. His silver medal was given to German wrestler Roland Dudziak.
