= Eom Jin-han =

South Korean wrestler (born 1964)

Personal information
- Nationality: South Korean
- Born: 9 April 1964 (age 62)

Sport
- Sport: Wrestling
Medal record
Greco-Roman wrestling
Representing South Korea
Asian Games
Gold medal – first place	1990 Beijing	90 kg
Gold medal – first place	1994 Hiroshima	90 kg
Bronze medal – third place	1986 Seoul	90 kg

Eom Jin-han (born 9 April 1964) is a South Korean wrestler. He competed at the 1988 Summer Olympics, the 1992 Summer Olympics, and the 1996 Summer Olympics.
