= Ali Akbarnejad =

Iranian wrestler (born 1967)

Ali Akbarnejad (born 16 September 1967) is an Iranian former wrestler who competed in the 1992 Summer Olympics.
