= Asian Wrestling Championships =

Wrestling Asian championship

Asian Wrestling Championships is the Wrestling Asian Championship organized by the Asian Associated Wrestling Committee (AAWC).

The men's tournament began in 1979 and The women's tournament was first staged in 1996, and it has been held every year.

== Editions ==
Year	Dates	City and host country	Champion		
Year	Dates	City and host country	Men's freestyle	Men's Greco-Roman	Women's freestyle
1979	8–11 November	Jalandhar, India	Iran	—	—
1981	1–4 December	Lahore, Pakistan	Iran	—	—
1983	8–11 November	Tehran, Iran	Iran	Iran	—
1987	13–17 October	Mumbai, India	Iran	Japan	—
1988	12–16 December	Islamabad, Pakistan	Iran	—	—
1989	30 June – 2 July	Oarai, Japan	Iran	South Korea	—
1991	17–19 April	New Delhi, India	Iran	—	—
1991	16–18 May	Tehran, Iran	—	South Korea	—
1992	7–10 April	Tehran, Iran	Iran	South Korea	—
1993	16–18 April	Ulaanbaatar, Mongolia	Iran	—	—
1993	23–25 April	Hiroshima, Japan	—	South Korea	—
1995	27 June – 3 July	Manila, Philippines	Iran	Kazakhstan	—
1996	4–10 April	Xiaoshan, China	Iran	South Korea	Japan
1997	12–18 April	Tehran, Iran	Iran	South Korea	—
1997	20–21 July	Taipei, Taiwan	—	—	Japan
1999	25–30 May	Tashkent, Uzbekistan	Uzbekistan	Uzbekistan	Japan
2000	26–28 April	Guilin, China	Uzbekistan	—	—
2000	5–7 May	Seoul, South Korea	—	South Korea	Japan
2001	5–10 June	Ulaanbaatar, Mongolia	Iran	Iran	China
2003	5–8 June	New Delhi, India	Iran	Iran	Japan
2004	16–18 April	Tehran, Iran	Iran	—	—
2004	8–9 May	Almaty, Kazakhstan	—	Kazakhstan	—
2004	20–22 May	Tokyo, Japan	—	—	Japan
2005	24–29 May	Wuhan, China	Iran	South Korea	Japan
2006	4–9 April	Almaty, Kazakhstan	Iran	Kazakhstan	Japan
2007	8–13 May	Bishkek, Kyrgyzstan	Iran	Iran	China
2008	18–23 March	Jeju, South Korea	Japan	Iran	Japan
2009	2–7 May	Pattaya, Thailand	Iran	Iran	China
2010	12–16 May	New Delhi, India	Iran	South Korea	China
2011	19–22 May	Tashkent, Uzbekistan	Uzbekistan	Iran	Japan
2012	16–19 February	Gumi, South Korea	Iran	Iran	China
2013	18–22 April	New Delhi, India	India	South Korea	China
2014	23–27 April	Astana, Kazakhstan	Iran	Kazakhstan	Japan
2015	6–10 May	Doha, Qatar	Iran	Iran	Japan
2016	17–21 February	Bangkok, Thailand	Iran	Iran	China
2017	10–14 May	New Delhi, India	Iran	Iran	Japan
2018	28 February – 4 March	Bishkek, Kyrgyzstan	Uzbekistan	Kazakhstan	China
2019	23–28 April	Xi'an, China	Iran	Iran	Japan
2020	18–23 February	New Delhi, India	Iran	Iran	Japan
2021	13–18 April	Almaty, Kazakhstan	Iran	Iran	Mongolia
2022	19–24 April	Ulaanbaatar, Mongolia	Iran	Kazakhstan	Japan
2023	9–14 April	Astana, Kazakhstan	Kazakhstan	Iran	Japan
2024	11–16 April	Bishkek, Kyrgyzstan	Iran	Iran	Japan
2025	25–30 March	Amman, Jordan	Iran	Iran	Japan
2026	6–12 April	Bishkek, Kyrgyzstan	Iran	Iran	China
2027	30 March – 4 April				

== Team titles ==
Country	FS	GR	FW	Total
Iran	32	18	0	50
Japan	1	1	19	21
South Korea	0	10	0	10
China	0	0	9	9
Kazakhstan	1	6	0	7
Uzbekistan	4	1	0	5
India	1	0	0	1
Mongolia	0	0	1	1

== All-time medal table ==
All-time medal count, as of the 2026 Asian Wrestling Championships.

Rank	Nation	Gold	Silver	Bronze	Total
1	Iran	252	106	141	499
2	Japan	167	129	176	472
3	Kazakhstan	94	96	167	357
4	South Korea	85	79	138	302
5	China	76	78	151	305
6	Uzbekistan	53	62	103	218
7	Kyrgyzstan	43	52	105	200
8	North Korea	42	45	44	131
9	Mongolia	29	94	129	252
10	India	28	91	153	272
11	Syria	4	2	2	8
12	Bahrain	3	4	12	19
13	Chinese Taipei	1	14	19	34
14	Tajikistan	1	10	16	27
15	Pakistan	1	9	8	18
16	Iraq	1	3	14	18
17	Turkmenistan	1	2	6	9
18	Qatar	1	1	1	3
–	United States (Guest)	1	0	0	1
19	Vietnam	0	5	12	17
20	Thailand	0	2	0	2
21	Jordan	0	1	4	5
22	Philippines	0	0	2	2
Totals (22 entries)		883	885	1,403	3,171
