= Wrestling at the 1972 Summer Olympics – Men's freestyle 57 kg =

Men's freestyle 57 kg at the Games of the XX Olympiad
- Venue: Messe München
- Dates: 27–31 August 1972
- Competitors: 28 from 28 nations

Medalists
1st place, gold medalist(s)		Hideaki Yanagida	Japan
2nd place, silver medalist(s)		Richard Sanders	United States
3rd place, bronze medalist(s)		László Klinga	Hungary

The Men's Freestyle 57 kg at the 1972 Summer Olympics as part of the wrestling program at the Fairgrounds, Judo and Wrestling Hall.

== Medalists ==
Gold	Hideaki Yanagida; Japan
Silver	Richard Sanders; United States
Bronze	László Klinga; Hungary

== Tournament results ==
The competition used a form of negative points tournament, with negative points given for any result short of a fall. Accumulation of 6 negative points eliminated the wrestler. When only two or three wrestlers remain, a special final round is used to determine the order of the medals.

Legend

- DNA — Did not appear
- TPP — Total penalty points
- MPP — Match penalty points

Penalties

- 0 — Won by Fall, Passivity, Injury and Forfeit
- 0.5 — Won by Technical Superiority
- 1 — Won by Points
- 2 — Draw
- 2.5 — Draw, Passivity
- 3 — Lost by Points
- 3.5 — Lost by Technical Superiority
- 4 — Lost by Fall, Passivity, Injury and Forfeit

=== Round 1 ===
TPP	MPP		Time		MPP	TPP
3	3	Horst Mayer (GDR)		Ramezan Kheder (IRI)	1	1
0.5	0.5	Amrik Singh Gill (GBR)		Juan Velarde (PER)	3.5	3.5
1	1	Moises López (MEX)		Egon Beiler (CAN)	3	3
3	3	Megdiin Khoilogdorj (MGL)		Ivan Kuleshov (URS)	1	1
0	0	László Klinga (HUN)	1:22	Arturo Tanaquin (PHI)	4	4
3	3	Kazım Yıldırım (TUR)		Ivan Shavov (BUL)	1	1
1	1	Zbigniew Żedzicki (POL)		An Jea-Won (KOR)	3	3
0.5	0.5	Hideaki Yanagida (JPN)		Ernst Hack (AUT)	3.5	3.5
4	4	Georgios Hatziioannidis (GRE)	5:15	Richard Sanders (USA)	0	0
4	4	Hsu Chin-hsiung (ROC)	4:16	Nicolae Dumitru (ROU)	0	0
1	1	Eduardo Maggiolo (ARG)		Luis Fuentes (GUA)	3	3
4	4	Raymond Barry (AUS)	8:37	Prem Nath (IND)	0	0
1	1	Jorge Ramos (CUB)		Allah Ditta (PAK)	3	3
0	0	Ghulam Sideeq (AFG)	5:47	Risto Darlev (YUG)	4	4

=== Round 2 ===
TPP	MPP		Time		MPP	TPP
3.5	0.5	Horst Mayer (GDR)		Amrik Singh Gill (GBR)	3.5	4
1	0	Ramezan Kheder (IRI)	5:10	Juan Velarde (PER)	4	7.5
5	4	Moises López (MEX)	8:21	Megdiin Khoilogdorj (MGL)	0	3
6.5	3.5	Egon Beiler (CAN)		Ivan Kuleshov (URS)	0.5	1.5
0.5	0.5	László Klinga (HUN)		Kazım Yıldırım (TUR)	3.5	6.5
8	4	Arturo Tanaquin (PHI)	0:57	Ivan Shavov (BUL)	0	1
4.5	3.5	Zbigniew Żedzicki (POL)		Hideaki Yanagida (JPN)	0.5	1
3.5	0.5	An Jea-Won (KOR)		Ernst Hack (AUT)	3.5	7
4	0	Georgios Hatziioannidis (GRE)	3:49	Hsu Chin-Hsiung (ROC)	4	8
0	0	Richard Sanders (USA)	5:34	Nicolae Dumitru (ROU)	4	4
1	0	Eduardo Maggiolo (ARG)	4:34	Raymond Barry (AUS)	4	8
6	3	Luis Fuentes (GUA)		Prem Nath (IND)	1	1
2	1	Jorge Ramos (CUB)		Ghulam Sideeq (AFG)	3	3
6	3	Allah Ditta (PAK)		Risto Darlev (YUG)	1	5

=== Round 3 ===
TPP	MPP		Time		MPP	TPP
3.5	0	Horst Mayer (GDR)	8:30	Moises López (MEX)	4	9
1	0	Ramezan Kheder (IRI)	1:25	Amrik Singh Gill (GBR)	4	8
5	2	Megdiin Khoilogdorj (MGL)		László Klinga (HUN)	2	2.5
5.5	4	Ivan Kuleshov (URS)	1:35	Ivan Shavov (BUL)	0	1
4.5	0	Zbigniew Żedzicki (POL)	1:16	Georgios Hatziioannidis (GRE)	4	8
7.5	4	An Jea-Won (KOR)	1:20	Hideaki Yanagida (JPN)	0	1
0	0	Richard Sanders (USA)	1:32	Eduardo Maggiolo (ARG)	4	5
7	3	Nicolae Dumitru (ROU)		Jorge Ramos (CUB)	1	3
1	0	Prem Nath (IND)	6:39	Ghulam Sideeq (AFG)	4	7
5		Risto Darlev (YUG)		Bye		

=== Round 4 ===
TPP	MPP		Time		MPP	TPP
9	4	Risto Darlev (YUG)	5:01	Horst Mayer (GDR)	0	3.5
2	1	Ramezan Kheder (IRI)		Megdiin Khoilogdorj (MGL)	3	8
9.5	4	Ivan Kuleshov (URS)	3:24	László Klinga (HUN)	0	2.5
1	0	Ivan Shavov (BUL)	1:23	Zbigniew Żedzicki (POL)	4	8.5
2	1	Hideaki Yanagida (JPN)		Richard Sanders (USA)	3	3
9	4	Eduardo Maggiolo (ARG)	4:33	Prem Nath (IND)	0	1
3		Jorge Ramos (CUB)		Bye		

=== Round 5 ===
TPP	MPP		Time		MPP	TPP
6	3	Jorge Ramos (CUB)		Horst Mayer (GDR)	1	4.5
5	3	Ramezan Kheder (IRI)		László Klinga (HUN)	1	3.5
4	3	Ivan Shavov (BUL)		Hideaki Yanagida (JPN)	1	3
3	0	Richard Sanders (USA)	1:23	Prem Nath (IND)	4	5

=== Round 6 ===
TPP	MPP		Time		MPP	TPP
7.5	3	Horst Mayer (GDR)		László Klinga (HUN)	1	4.5
8	3	Ramezan Kheder (IRI)		Hideaki Yanagida (JPN)	1	4
7	3	Ivan Shavov (BUL)		Richard Sanders (USA)	1	4
5		Prem Nath (IND)		Bye		

=== Round 7 ===
TPP	MPP		Time		MPP	TPP
9	4	Prem Nath (IND)	5:10	Hideaki Yanagida (JPN)	0	4
8.5	4	László Klinga (HUN)	6:38	Richard Sanders (USA)	0	4

=== Final ===
Results from the preliminary round are carried forward into the final (shown in yellow).

TPP	MPP		Time		MPP	TPP
1	1	Hideaki Yanagida (JPN)		Richard Sanders (USA)	3	3

== Final standings ==
1. Hideaki Yanagida (JPN)
2. Richard Sanders (USA)
3. László Klinga (HUN)
4. Prem Premnath (IND)
5. Ivan Shavov (BUL)
6. Horst Mayer (GDR)
7. Ramezan Kheder (IRI)
8. Jorge Ramos (CUB)
