= List of World and Olympic Champions in men's freestyle wrestling =

Listed are wrestlers who were World or Olympic Champions in men's freestyle wrestling. Men's freestyle wrestling competition began at the Olympics in 1904. The World Championships for men's freestyle wrestling began in 1951. The World Championships takes place during non-Olympic years. At the World Championships team scoring is kept, while no official team statistics are kept at the Olympics.

== World Level Champions in Men's Freestyle Wrestling by Year and Weight ==
Olympic Champions and Olympic competition years in freestyle wrestling are highlighted in gold.

=== 1904 ===
Year	Team	47.6 kg	52.2 kg	56.7 kg	61.2 kg	65.8 kg	71.7 kg	71.7+ kg
1904	(United States)	(United States) Curry, Robert (1/1)	(United States) Mehnert, George (1/2)	(United States) Niflot, Isidor (1/1)	(United States) Bradshaw, Benjamin (1/1)	(United States) Roehm, Otto (1/1)	(Norway) Ericksen, Charles (1/1)	(Norway) Hansen, Bernhoff (1/1)

=== 1908 ===
Year	Team	54 kg	60.3 kg	66.6 kg	73 kg	73+ kg
1908	(United Kingdom)	(United States) Mehnert, George (2/2)	(United States) Dole, George (1/1)	(United Kingdom) de Relwyskow, George (1/1)	(United Kingdom) Bacon, Stanley (1/1)	(United Kingdom) O'Kelly, Con (1/1)

=== 1920 ===
Year	Team	60 kg	67.5 kg	75 kg	82.5 kg	82.5+ kg
1920	(Finland)	(United States) Ackerly, Charles (1/1)	(Finland) Anttila, Kalle (1/1)	(Finland) Leino, Eino (1/1)	(Sweden) Larsson, Anders (1/1)	(Switzerland) Roth, Robert (1/1)

=== 1924–1936 ===
Year	Team	56 kg	61 kg	66 kg	72 kg	79 kg	87 kg	87+ kg
1924	(United States)	(Finland) Pihlajamäki, Kustaa (1/2)	(United States) Reed, Robin (1/1)	(United States) Vis, Russell (1/1)	(Switzerland) Gehri, Hermann (1/1)	(Switzerland) Hagmann, Fritz (1/1)	(United States) Spellman, John (1/1)	(United States) Steel, Harry (1/1)
1928	(Finland)	(Finland) Mäkinen, Kaarlo (1/1)	(United States) Morrison, Allie (1/1)	(Estonia) Käpp, Osvald (1/1)	(Finland) Haavisto, Arvo (1/1)	(Switzerland) Kyburz, Ernst (1/1)	(Sweden) Sjöstedt, Thure (1/1)	(Sweden) Richthoff, Johan (1/2)
1932	(United States)	(United States) Pearce, Robert (1/1)	(Finland) Pihlajamäki, Hermanni (1/1)	(France) Pacôme, Charles (1/1)	(United States) van Bebber, Jack (1/1)	(Sweden) Johansson, Ivar (1/1)	(United States) Mehringer, Peter (1/1)	(Sweden) Richthoff, Johan (2/2)
1936	(Hungary)	(Hungary) Zombori, Ödön (1/1)	(Finland) Pihlajamäki, Kustaa (2/2)	(Hungary) Kárpáti, Károly (1/1)	(United States) Lewis, Frank (1/1)	(France) Poilvé, Emile (1/1)	(Sweden) Fridell, Knut (1/1)	(Estonia) Palusalu, Kristjan (1/1)

=== 1948–1968 ===
Year	Team	52 kg	57 kg	62 kg (−1961), 63 kg (1962–1968)	67 kg (−1961), 70 kg (1962–1968)	73 kg (−1961), 78 kg (1962–1968)	79 kg (−1961), 87 kg (1962–1968)	87 kg (−1961), 97 kg (1962–1968)	87+ kg (−1961), 97+ kg (1962–1968)
1948	(Turkey)	(Finland) Viitala, Lenni (1/1)	(Turkey) Akar, Nasuh (1/2)	(Turkey) Bilge, Gazanfer (1/1)	(Turkey) Atik, Celal (1/2)	(Turkey) Doğu, Yaşar (1/2)	(United States) Brand, Glen (1/1)	(United States) Wittenberg, Henry (1/1)	(Hungary) Bóbis, Gyula (1/1)
1949	N/A	No Championships Held							
1950	N/A	No Championships Held							
1951	(Turkey)	(Turkey) Yuecel, Ali (1/1)	(Turkey) Akar, Nasuh (2/2)	(Turkey) Zafer, Nurettin (1/1)	(Sweden) Anderberg, Olle (1/2)	(Turkey) Atik, Celal (2/2)	(Turkey) Zafer, Haydar (1/1)	(Turkey) Doğu, Yaşar (2/2)	(Sweden) Antonsson, Bertil (1/1)
1952	(Sweden)	(Turkey) Gemici, Hasan (1/1)	(Japan) Ishii, Shohachi (1/1)	(Turkey) Şit, Bayram (1/1)	(Sweden) Anderberg, Olle (2/2)	(United States) Smith, William (1/1)	(Soviet Union) Tsimakuridze, David (1/1)	(Sweden) Palm, Viking (1/1)	(Soviet Union) Mekokishvili, Arsen (1/2)
1953	N/A	No Championships Held							
1954	(Turkey)	(Turkey) Akbaş, Hüseyin (1/4)	(Turkey) Dağıstanlı, Mustafa (1/5)	(Japan) Sasahara, Shozo (1/2)	(Iran) Towfigh, Jahanbakht (1/1)	(Soviet Union) Balavadze, Vakhtang (1/2)	(Iran) Zandi, Abbas (1/1)	(Soviet Union) Englas, August (1/1)	(Soviet Union) Mekokishvili, Arsen (2/2)
1955	N/A	No Championships Held							
1956	(Iran)	(Soviet Union) Tsalkalamanidze, Mirian (1/1)	(Turkey) Dağıstanlı, Mustafa (2/5)	(Japan) Sasahara, Shozo (2/2)	(Iran) Habibi, Emam-Ali (1/4)	(Japan) Ikeda, Mitsuo (1/1)	(Bulgaria) Stanchev, Nikola (1/1)	(Iran) Takhti, Gholamreza (1/3)	(Turkey) Kaplan, Hamit (1/2)
1957	(Turkey)	(Turkey) Kartal, Mehmet (1/1)	(Turkey) Akbaş, Hüseyin (2/4)	(Turkey) Dağıstanlı, Mustafa (3/5)	(Soviet Union) Bestayev, Alimbeg (1/1)	(Soviet Union) Balavadze, Vakhtang (2/2)	(Iran) Sorouri, Nabi (1/1)	(Bulgaria) Sirakov, Petko (1/1)	(Turkey) Kaplan, Hamit (2/2)
1958	N/A	No Championships Held							
1959	(Soviet Union)	(Soviet Union) Aliev, Ali (1/5)	(Turkey) Akbaş, Hüseyin (3/4)	(Turkey) Dağıstanlı, Mustafa (4/5)	(Soviet Union) Sinyavski, Vladimir (1/1)	(Iran) Habibi, Emam-Ali (2/4)	(Soviet Union) Skhirtladze, Georgi (1/1)	(Iran) Takhti, Gholamreza (2/3)	(Bulgaria) Ahmedov, Lyutvi (1/1)
1960	(Turkey)	(Turkey) Bilek, Ahmet (1/1)	(United States) McCann, Terry (1/1)	(Turkey) Dağıstanlı, Mustafa (5/5)	(United States) Wilson, Shelby (1/1)	(United States) Blubaugh, Douglas (1/1)	(Turkey) Güngör, Hasan (1/1)	(Turkey) Atli, Ismet (1/1)	(Germany) Dietrich, Wilfried (1/2)
1961	(Iran)	(Soviet Union) Aliev, Ali (2/5)	(Iran) Seifpour, Ebrahim (1/2)	(Soviet Union) Rubashvili, Vladimir (1/1)	(Iran) Sanatkaran, Mohammad (1/1)	(Iran) Habibi, Emam-Ali (3/4)	(Iran) Mehdizadeh, Mansour (1/3)	(Iran) Takhti, Gholamreza (3/3)	(West Germany) Dietrich, Wilfried (2/2)
1962	(Soviet Union)	(Soviet Union) Aliev, Ali (3/5)	(Turkey) Akbaş, Hüseyin (4/4)	(Japan) Watanabe, Osamu (1/3)	(Bulgaria) Valchev, Enyu (1/2)	(Iran) Habibi, Emam-Ali (4/4)	(Iran) Mehdizadeh, Mansour (2/3)	(Soviet Union) Medved, Aleksandr (1/10)	(Soviet Union) Ivanitsky, Aleksandr (1/5)
1963	(Soviet Union)	(Turkey) Yanilmaz, Cemal (1/1)	(Soviet Union) Ibragimov, Aydin (1/1)	(Japan) Watanabe, Osamu (2/3)	(Japan) Horiuchi, Iwao (1/1)	(Soviet Union) Sagaradze, Guliko (1/2)	(Bulgaria) Gardzhev, Prodan (1/3)	(Soviet Union) Medved, Aleksandr (2/10)	(Soviet Union) Ivanitsky, Aleksandr (2/5)
1964	(Japan)	(Japan) Yoshida, Yoshikatsu (1/1)	(Japan) Uetake, Yojiro (1/2)	(Japan) Watanabe, Osamu (3/3)	(Bulgaria) Valchev, Enyu (2/2)	(Turkey) Ogan, Ismail (1/1)	(Bulgaria) Gardzhev, Prodan (2/3)	(Soviet Union) Medved, Aleksandr (3/10)	(Soviet Union) Ivanitsky, Aleksandr (3/5)
1965	(Iran)	(Japan) Yoshida, Yoshihisa (1/1)	(Japan) Fukuda, Tomiaki (1/1)	(Iran) Seifpour, Ebrahim (2/2)	(Iran) Mohaved, Abdollah (1/6)	(Soviet Union) Sagaradze, Guliko (2/2)	(Iran) Mehdizadeh, Mansour (3/3)	(Turkey) Ayık, Ahmet (1/3)	(Soviet Union) Ivanitsky, Aleksandr (4/5)
1966	(Turkey)	(South Korea) Chang, Chang-sun (1/1)	(Soviet Union) Aliev, Ali (4/5)	(Japan) Kaneka, Masaaki (1/3)	(Iran) Mohaved, Abdollah (2/6)	(Turkey) Atalay, Mahmut (1/2)	(Bulgaria) Gardzhev, Prodan (3/3)	(Soviet Union) Medved, Aleksandr (4/10)	(Soviet Union) Ivanitsky, Aleksandr (5/5)
1967	(Soviet Union)	(Japan) Nakata, Shigeo (1/2)	(Soviet Union) Aliev, Ali (5/5)	(Japan) Kaneka, Masaaki (2/3)	(Iran) Mohaved, Abdollah (3/6)	(France) Robin, Daniel (1/1)	(Soviet Union) Gurevich, Boris Mikhaylovich (1/3)	(Turkey) Ayık, Ahmet (2/3)	(Soviet Union) Medved, Aleksandr (5/10)
1968	(Japan)	(Japan) Nakata, Shigeo (2/2)	(Japan) Uetake, Yojiro (2/2)	(Japan) Kaneka, Masaaki (3/3)	(Iran) Mohaved, Abdollah (4/6)	(Turkey) Atalay, Mahmut (2/2)	(Soviet Union) Gurevich, Boris Mikhaylovich (2/3)	(Turkey) Ayık, Ahmet (3/3)	(Soviet Union) Medved, Aleksandr (6/10)

=== 1969–1996 ===
Year	Team	48 kg	52 kg	57 kg	62 kg	68 kg	74 kg	82 kg	90 kg	100 kg	100+ kg (−1984), 130 kg (1985–1996)
1969	(Soviet Union)	(Iran) Javadi, Ebrahim (1/4)	(United States) Sanders, Rick (1/1)	(Japan) Tanaka, Tadamichi (1/1)	(Japan) Morita, Takeo (1/1)	(Iran) Mohaved, Abdollah (5/6)	(Soviet Union) Beriashvili, Zarbeg (1/1)	(United States) Fozzard, Fred (1/1)	(Soviet Union) Gurevich, Boris Mikhaylovich (3/3)	(Soviet Union) Lomidze, Shota (1/2)	(Soviet Union) Medved, Aleksandr (7/10)
1970	(Soviet Union)	(Iran) Javadi, Ebrahim (2/4)	(Turkey) Alan, Ali Riza (1/1)	(Japan) Yanagida, Hideaki (1/3)	(Iran) Seyed, Shamseddin (1/1)	(Iran) Mohaved, Abdollah (6/6)	(United States) Wells, Wayne (1/2)	(Soviet Union) Shakhmuradov, Yury (1/1)	(Soviet Union) Strakhov, Gennady (1/1)	(Soviet Union) Gulyutkin, Vladimir (1/2)	(Soviet Union) Medved, Aleksandr (8/10)
1971	(Soviet Union)	(Iran) Javadi, Ebrahim (3/4)	(Iran) Ghorbani, Mohammad (1/1)	(Japan) Yanagida, Hideaki (2/3)	(Soviet Union) Abdulbekov, Zagalav (1/3)	(United States) Gable, Dan (1/2)	(Soviet Union) Gusov, Yury (1/1)	(Soviet Union) Tediashvili, Levan (1/6)	(Bulgaria) Petrov, Rusi (1/1)	(Soviet Union) Lomidze, Shota (2/2)	(Soviet Union) Medved, Aleksandr (9/10)
1972	(Soviet Union)	(Soviet Union) Dmitriyev, Roman (1/2)	(Japan) Kato, Kiyomi (1/1)	(Japan) Yanagida, Hideaki (3/3)	(Soviet Union) Abdulbekov, Zagalav (2/3)	(United States) Gable, Dan (2/2)	(United States) Wells, Wayne (2/2)	(Soviet Union) Tediashvili, Levan (2/6)	(United States) Peterson, Ben (1/1)	(Soviet Union) Yarygin, Ivan (1/3)	(Soviet Union) Medved, Aleksandr (10/10)
1973	(Soviet Union)	(Soviet Union) Dmitriyev, Roman (2/2)	(Iran) Javadi, Ebrahim (4/4)	(Iran) Farahvashi, Mohsen (1/1)	(Soviet Union) Abdulbekov, Zagalav (3/3)	(United States) Keaser, Lloyd (1/1)	(Iran) Barzegar, Mansour (1/1)	(Soviet Union) Syulzhin, Vasily (1/1)	(Soviet Union) Tediashvili, Levan (3/6)	(Soviet Union) Yarygin, Ivan (2/3)	(Soviet Union) Andiyev, Soslan (1/6)
1974	(Soviet Union)	(Bulgaria) Isaev, Khasan (1/3)	(Japan) Takada, Yuji (1/5)	(Soviet Union) Yumin, Vladimir (1/5)	(Mongolia) Oidov, Zevegiin (1/2)	(Soviet Union) Nasrullayev, Nasrulla (1/1)	(Soviet Union) Ashuraliyev, Ruslan (1/2)	(Soviet Union) Novozhilov, Viktor (1/1)	(Soviet Union) Tediashvili, Levan (4/6)	(Soviet Union) Gulyutkin, Vladimir (2/2)	(Romania) Simon, Ladislau (1/1)
1975	(Soviet Union)	(Bulgaria) Isaev, Khasan (2/3)	(Japan) Takada, Yuji (2/5)	(Japan) Arai, Masao (1/1)	(Mongolia) Oidov, Zevegiin (2/2)	(Soviet Union) Pinigin, Pavel (1/4)	(Soviet Union) Ashuraliyev, Ruslan (2/2)	(West Germany) Seger, Adolf (1/2)	(Soviet Union) Tediashvili, Levan (5/6)	(Mongolia) Bayanmönkh, Khorloogiin (1/1)	(Soviet Union) Andiyev, Soslan (2/6)
1976	(Soviet Union)	(Bulgaria) Isaev, Khasan (3/3)	(Japan) Takada, Yuji (3/5)	(Soviet Union) Yumin, Vladimir (2/5)	(South Korea) Yang, Jung-mo (1/1)	(Soviet Union) Pinigin, Pavel (2/4)	(Japan) Date, Jiichiro (1/1)	(United States) Peterson, John (1/1)	(Soviet Union) Tediashvili, Levan (6/6)	(Soviet Union) Yarygin, Ivan (3/3)	(Soviet Union) Andiyev, Soslan (3/6)
1977	(Soviet Union)	(Soviet Union) Beloglazov, Anatoly (1/4)	(Japan) Takada, Yuji (4/5)	(Japan) Sasaki, Tadashi (1/1)	(Soviet Union) Yumin, Vladimir (3/5)	(Soviet Union) Pinigin, Pavel (3/4)	(United States) Dziedzic, Stan (1/1)	(West Germany) Seger, Adolf (2/2)	(Soviet Union) Prokopchuk, Anatoly (1/1)	(Soviet Union) Bisultanov, Aslanbek (2/2)	(Soviet Union) Andiyev, Soslan (4/6)
1978	(Soviet Union)	(Soviet Union) Kornilayev, Sergei (1/4)	(Soviet Union) Beloglazov, Anatoly (2/4)	(Japan) Tomiyama, Hideaki (1/3)	(Soviet Union) Yumin, Vladimir (4/5)	(Soviet Union) Pinigin, Pavel (4/4)	(United States) Kemp, Lee (1/3)	(Soviet Union) Aratsilov, Magomedkhan (1/1)	(East Germany) Neupert, Uwe (1/2)	(East Germany) Büttner, Harald (1/1)	(Soviet Union) Andiyev, Soslan (5/6)
1979	(Soviet Union)	(Soviet Union) Kornilayev, Sergei (2/4)	(Japan) Takada, Yuji (5/5)	(Japan) Tomiyama, Hideaki (2/3)	(Soviet Union) Yumin, Vladimir (5/5)	(Soviet Union) Charachura, Mikhail (1/2)	(United States) Kemp, Lee (2/3)	(Hungary) Kovács, István (1/1)	(Soviet Union) Ortzev, Khasan (1/1)	(Soviet Union) Mate, Ilya (1/3)	(Soviet Union) Khasimikov, Salman (1/4)
1980	(Soviet Union)	Pollio, Claudio (1/1)	(Soviet Union) Beloglazov, Anatoly (3/4)	(Soviet Union) Beloglazov, Sergei (1/8)	(Soviet Union) Abushev, Magomedgasan (3/3)	(Soviet Union) Absaidov, Saipulla (1/2)	(Bulgaria) Raychev, Valentin (1/1)	(Bulgaria) Abilov, Ismail (1/1)	(Soviet Union) Oganisyan, Sanasar (2/3)	(Soviet Union) Mate, Ilya (2/3)	(Soviet Union) Andiyev, Soslan (6/6)
1981	(Soviet Union)	(Soviet Union) Kornilayev, Sergei (3/4)	(Japan) Asakura, Toshio (1/1)	(Soviet Union) Beloglazov, Sergei (2/8)	(Bulgaria) Shterev, Simeon (1/1)	(Soviet Union) Absaidov, Saipulla (2/2)	(West Germany) Knosp, Martin (1/1)	(United States) Campbell, Chris (1/1)	(Soviet Union) Oganisyan, Sanasar (3/3)	(East Germany) Gehrke, Roland (1/1)	(Soviet Union) Khasimikov, Salman (2/4)
1982	(Soviet Union)	(Soviet Union) Kornilayev, Sergei (4/4)	(East Germany) Reich, Hartmut (1/1)	(Soviet Union) Beloglazov, Anatoly (4/4)	(Soviet Union) Beloglazov, Sergei (3/8)	(Soviet Union) Charachura, Mikhail (2/2)	(United States) Kemp, Lee (3/3)	(Soviet Union) Dzgoev, Taymuraz (1/2)	(East Germany) Neupert, Uwe (2/2)	(Soviet Union) Mate, Ilya (3/3)	(Soviet Union) Khasimikov, Salman (3/4)
1983	(Soviet Union)	(North Korea) Kim, Chol-han (1/2)	(Bulgaria) Yordanov, Valentin (1/8)	(Soviet Union) Beloglazov, Sergei (4/8)	(Soviet Union) Alekseev, Viktor (1/2)	(Soviet Union) Fadzaev, Arsen (1/8)	(United States) Schultz, Dave (1/2)	(Soviet Union) Dzgoev, Taymuraz (2/2)	(Soviet Union) Naniev, Petr (1/1)	(Soviet Union) Khadartsev, Aslan (1/3)	(Soviet Union) Khasimikov, Salman (4/4)
1984	(United States)	(United States) Weaver, Bobby (1/1)	(Socialist Federal Republic of Yugoslavia) Trstena, Šaban (1/1)	(Japan) Tomiyama, Hideaki (3/3)	(United States) Lewis, Randy (1/1)	(South Korea) You, In-tak (1/1)	(United States) Schultz, Dave (2/2)	(United States) Schultz, Mark (1/3)	(United States) Banach, Ed (1/1)	(United States) Banach, Lou (1/1)	(United States) Baumgartner, Bruce (1/5)
1985	(Soviet Union)	(North Korea) Kim, Chol-han (2/2)	(Bulgaria) Yordanov, Valentin (2/8)	(Soviet Union) Beloglazov, Sergei (5/8)	(Soviet Union) Alekseev, Viktor (2/2)	(Soviet Union) Fadzaev, Arsen (2/8)	(Cuba) Cascaret, Raúl (1/2)	(United States) Schultz, Mark (2/3)	(United States) Scherr, Bill (1/1)	(Soviet Union) Khabelov, Leri (1/6)	(Soviet Union) Gobezhishvili, David (1/3)
1986	(Soviet Union)	(North Korea) Li, Jae-sik (1/2)	(North Korea) Kim Yong-sik (1/2)	(Soviet Union) Beloglazov, Sergei (6/8)	(Soviet Union) Isayev, Khazar (1/1)	(Soviet Union) Fadzaev, Arsen (3/8)	(Cuba) Cascaret, Raúl (2/2)	(Soviet Union) Modosian, Vladimir (1/1)	(Soviet Union) Khadartsev, Makharbek (1/7)	(Soviet Union) Khadartsev, Aslan (2/3)	(United States) Baumgartner, Bruce (2/5)
1987	(Soviet Union)	(North Korea) Li, Jae-sik (2/2)	(Bulgaria) Yordanov, Valentin (3/8)	(Soviet Union) Beloglazov, Sergei (7/8)	(United States) Smith, John (1/6)	(Soviet Union) Fadzaev, Arsen (4/8)	(Soviet Union) Varayev, Adlan (1/1)	(United States) Schultz, Mark (3/3)	(Soviet Union) Khadartsev, Makharbek (2/7)	(Soviet Union) Khabelov, Leri (2/6)	(Soviet Union) Khadartsev, Aslan (3/3)
1988	(Soviet Union)	(Japan) Kobayashi, Takashi (1/1)	(Japan) Sato, Mitsuru (1/1)	(Soviet Union) Beloglazov, Sergei (8/8)	(United States) Smith, John (2/6)	(Soviet Union) Fadzaev, Arsen (5/8)	(United States) Monday, Kenny (1/2)	(South Korea) Han, Myung-woo (1/1)	(Soviet Union) Khadartsev, Makharbek (3/7)	(Romania) Puşcaşu, Vasile (1/1)	(Soviet Union) Gobezhishvili, David (2/3)
1989	(Soviet Union)	(South Korea) Kim, Jong-shin (1/1)	(Bulgaria) Yordanov, Valentin (4/8)	(North Korea) Kim Yong-sik (2/2)	(United States) Smith, John (3/6)	(Soviet Union) Budayev, Boris (1/1)	(United States) Monday, Kenny (2/2)	(Soviet Union) Jabrailov, Elmadi (1/1)	(Soviet Union) Khadartsev, Makharbek (4/7)	(Soviet Union) Atavov, Ahmed (1/1)	(Iran) Soleimani, Alireza (1/1)
1990	(Soviet Union)	(Cuba) Martínez, Aldo (1/1)	(Iran) Torkan, Majid (1/1)	(Cuba) Puerto, Alejandro (1/3)	(United States) Smith, John (4/6)	(Soviet Union) Fadzaev, Arsen (6/8)	(Bulgaria) Sukra, Rahmat (1/1)	(Czechoslovakia) Lohyňa, Jozef (1/1)	(Soviet Union) Khadartsev, Makharbek (5/7)	(Soviet Union) Khabelov, Leri (3/6)	(Soviet Union) Gobezhishvili, David (3/3)
1991	(Soviet Union)	(Soviet Union) Vugar Orujov (1/2)	(United States) Jones, Zeke (1/1)	(Soviet Union) Smal, Sergey (1/1)	(United States) Smith, John (5/6)	(Soviet Union) Fadzaev, Arsen (7/8)	(Iran) Khadem, Amir Reza (1/1)	(United States) Jackson, Kevin (1/3)	(Soviet Union) Khadartsev, Makharbek (6/7)	(Soviet Union) Khabelov, Leri (4/6)	(Germany) Schröder, Andreas (1/1)
1992	Unified Team at the Olympics	(North Korea) Kim, Il (1/2)	(North Korea) Ri, Hak-son (1/1)	(Cuba) Puerto, Alejandro (2/3)	(United States) Smith, John (6/6)	Fadzaev, Arsen (8/8)	(South Korea) Park, Jang-soon (1/2)	(United States) Jackson, Kevin (2/3)	Khadartsev, Makharbek (7/7)	Khabelov, Leri (5/6)	(United States) Baumgartner, Bruce (3/5)
1993	(United States)	(Cuba) Vila, Alexis (1/2)	(Bulgaria) Yordanov, Valentin (5/8)	(United States) Brands, Terry (1/2)	(United States) Brands, Tom (1/2)	(Iran) Fallah, Akbar (1/1)	(South Korea) Park, Jang-soon (2/2)	(Turkey) Öztürk, Sabahattin (1/1)	(United States) Douglas, Melvin (1/1)	(Russia) Khabelov, Leri (6/6)	(United States) Baumgartner, Bruce (4/5)
1994	(Turkey)	(Cuba) Vila, Alexis (2/2)	(Bulgaria) Yordanov, Valentin (6/8)	(Cuba) Puerto, Alejandro (3/3)	(Russia) Azizov, Magomed (1/1)	(Germany) Leipold, Alexander (1/1)	(Turkey) Ceylan, Turan (1/1)	(Moldova) Zhabrailov, Lukman (1/1)	(Iran) Rasoul, Khadem (1/3)	(Germany) Sabejew, Arawat (1/1)	(Turkey) Demir, Mahmut (1/2)
1995	(United States)	(Russia) Oroudjov, Vougar (2/2)	(Bulgaria) Yordanov, Valentin (7/8)	(United States) Brands, Terry (2/2)	(Ukraine) Tedeyev, Elbrus (1/4)	(Armenia) Gevorgyan, Arayik (1/3)	(Russia) Saitiev, Buvaisar (1/9)	(United States) Jackson, Kevin (3/3)	(Iran) Rasoul, Khadem (2/3)	(United States) Angle, Kurt (1/2)	(United States) Baumgartner, Bruce (5/5)
1996	(United States)	(North Korea) Kim, Il (2/2)	(Bulgaria) Yordanov, Valentin (8/8)	(United States) Cross, Kendall (1/1)	(United States) Brands, Tom (2/2)	(Russia) Bogiyev, Vadim (1/1)	(Russia) Saitiev, Buvaisar (2/9)	(Russia) Magomedov, Khadzhimurad (1/2)	(Iran) Rasoul, Khadem (3/3)	(United States) Angle, Kurt (2/2)	(Turkey) Demir, Mahmut (2/2)

=== 1997–2001 ===
Year	Team	54 kg	58 kg	63 kg	69 kg	76 kg	85 kg	97 kg	130 kg
1997	(Russia)	(Cuba) García, Wilfredo (1/1)	(Iran) Talaei, Mohammad (1/1)	(Iran) Hajkenari, Abbas (1/1)	(Armenia) Gevorgyan, Arayik (2/3)	(Russia) Saitiev, Buvaisar (3/9)	(United States) Gutches, Les (1/1)	(Russia) Kuramagomedov, Kramagomed (1/1)	(Turkey) Güçlü, Zekeriya (1/1)
1998	(Iran)	(United States) Henson, Sammie (1/1)	(Iran) Dabir, Alireza (1/2)	(Bulgaria) Barzakov, Serafim (1/2)	(Armenia) Gevorgyan, Arayik (3/3)	(Russia) Saitiev, Buvaisar (4/9)	(Iran) Heidari, Alireza (1/1)	(Iran) Jadidi, Abbas (1/1)	(Cuba) Rodríguez, Alexis (1/1)
1999	(Russia)	(South Korea) Kim, Woo-yong (1/1)	(Turkey) Doğan, Harun (1/1)	(Ukraine) Tedeyev, Elbrus (2/4)	(Canada) Igali, Daniel (1/2)	(Russia) Saitiev, Adam (1/3)	(Cuba) Romero, Yoel (1/1)	(Russia) Murtazaliev, Sagid (1/2)	(United States) Neal, Stephen (1/1)
2000	(Russia)	(Azerbaijan) Abdullayev, Namig (1/1)	(Iran) Dabir, Alireza (2/2)	(Russia) Umakhanov, Mourad (1/1)	(Canada) Igali, Daniel (2/2)	(United States) Slay, Brandon (1/1)	(Russia) Saitiev, Adam (2/3)	(Russia) Murtazaliev, Sagid (2/2)	(Russia) Musulbes, David (1/3)
2001	(Russia)	(Belarus) Kantoyeu, Herman (1/1)	(Canada) Sissaouri, Guivi (1/1)	(Bulgaria) Barzakov, Serafim (2/2)	(Bulgaria) Paslar, Nicolay (1/1)	(Russia) Saitiev, Buvaisar (5/9)	(Russia) Magomedov, Khadzhimurad (2/2)	(Russia) Gogshelidze, Giorgi (1/1)	(Russia) Musulbes, David (2/3)

=== 2002–2013 ===
Year	Team	55 kg	60 kg	66 kg	74 kg	84 kg	96 kg	120 kg
2002	(Iran)	(Cuba) Montero, René (1/1)	(Armenia) Margaryan, Aram (1/1)	(Ukraine) Tedeyev, Elbrus (3/4)	(Iran) Hajizadeh, Mehdi (1/1)	(Russia) Saitiev, Adam (3/3)	(Georgia (country)) Kurtanidze, Eldar (1/2)	(Russia) Musulbes, David (3/3)
2003	(Georgia (country))	(Uzbekistan) Mansurov, Dilshod (1/2)	(Azerbaijan) Abdullayev, Arif (1/1)	(Russia) Farniev, Irbek (1/1)	(Russia) Saitiev, Buvaisar (6/9)	(Russia) Sazhidov, Sazhid (1/2)	(Georgia (country)) Kurtanidze, Eldar (2/2)	(Uzbekistan) Taymazov, Artur (1/3)
2004	(Russia)	(Russia) Batirov, Mavlet (1/3)	(Cuba) Quintana, Yandro (1/1)	(Ukraine) Tedeyev, Elbrus (4/4)	(Russia) Saitiev, Buvaisar (7/9)	(United States) Sanderson, Cael (1/1)	(Russia) Gatsalov, Khadzhimurat (1/6)	(Uzbekistan) Taymazov, Artur (2/3)
2005	(Russia)	(Uzbekistan) Mansurov, Dilshod (2/2)	(Russia) Dudayev, Alan (1/1)	(Russia) Murtazaliev, Makhach (1/2)	(Russia) Saitiev, Buvaisar (8/9)	(Georgia (country)) Mindorashvili, Revaz (1/2)	(Russia) Gatsalov, Khadzhimurat (2/6)	(Turkey) Polatçi, Aydin (1/1)
2006	(Russia)	(Bulgaria) Velikov, Radoslav (1/1)	(Iran) Mohammadi, Morad (1/1)	(United States) Zadick, Bill (1/1)	(Ukraine) Aldatov, Ibragim (1/2)	(Russia) Sazhidov, Sazhid (2/2)	(Russia) Gatsalov, Khadzhimurat (3/6)	(Uzbekistan) Taymazov, Artur (3/3)
2007	(Russia)	(Russia) Kudukhov, Besik (1/4)	(Russia) Batirov, Mavlet (2/3)	(Turkey) Şahin, Ramazan (1/2)	(Russia) Murtazaliev, Makhach (2/2)	(Russia) Ketoev, Georgy (1/1)	(Russia) Gatsalov, Khadzhimurat (4/6)	(Russia) Makhov, Bilyal (1/4)
2008	(Russia)	(United States) Cejudo, Henry (1/1)	(Russia) Batirov, Mavlet (3/3)	(Turkey) Şahin, Ramazan (2/2)	(Russia) Saitiev, Buvaisar (9/9)	(Georgia (country)) Mindorashvili, Revaz (2/2)	(Russia) Muradov, Shirvani (1/1)	(Russia) Akhmedov, Bakhtiyar (1/1)
2009	(Russia)	(North Korea) Yang, Kyong-il (1/2)	(Russia) Kudukhov, Besik (2/4)	(Iran) Teghavi Kermani, Mehdi (1/2)	(Russia) Tsargush, Denis (1/3)	(Uzbekistan) Sokhiev, Zaurbek (1/1)	(Russia) Gatsalov, Khadzhimurat (5/6)	(Russia) Makhov, Bilyal (2/4)
2010	(Russia)	(Russia) Lebedev, Viktor (1/2)	(Russia) Kudukhov, Besik (3/4)	(India) Kumar, Sushil (1/1)	(Russia) Tsargush, Denis (2/3)	(Bulgaria) Ganev, Mihail (1/1)	(Azerbaijan) Gazyumov, Khetag (1/1)	(Russia) Makhov, Bilyal (3/4)
2011	(Russia)	(Russia) Lebedev, Viktor (2/2)	(Russia) Kudukhov, Besik (4/4)	(Iran) Teghavi Kermani, Mehdi (2/2)	(United States) Burroughs, Jordan (1/7)	(Azerbaijan) Sharifov, Sharif (1/2)	(Iran) Yazdani, Reza (1/2)	(Belarus) Shemarov, Aleksey (1/1)
2012	(Russia)	(Russia) Otarsultanov, Djamal (1/1)	(Azerbaijan) Asgarov, Toghrul (1/1)	(Japan) Yonemitsu, Tatsuhiro (1/1)	(United States) Burroughs, Jordan (2/7)	(Azerbaijan) Sharifov, Sharif (2/2)	(United States) Varner, Jake (1/1)	(Iran) Ghasemi, Komeil (1/1) & (Russia) Makhov, Bilyal (4/4)
2013	(Iran)	(Iran) Rahimi, Hassan (1/1)	(Russia) Goygereyev, Bekkhan (1/1)	(Armenia) Safaryan, David (1/1)	(United States) Burroughs, Jordan (3/7)	(Ukraine) Aldatov, Ibragim (2/2)	(Iran) Yazdani, Reza (2/2)	(Russia) Gatsalov, Khadzhimurat (6/6)

=== 2014–2017 ===
Year	Team	57 kg	61 kg	65 kg	70 kg	74 kg	86 kg	97 kg	125 kg
2014	(Russia)	(North Korea) Yang, Kyong-il (2/2)	(Azerbaijan) Aliyev, Haji (1/3)	(Russia) Ramonov, Soslan (1/2)	(Russia) Tsabolov, Khetag (1/1)	(Russia) Tsargush, Denis (3/3)	(Russia) Sadulaev, Abdulrashid (1/8)	(Russia) Gadisov, Abdusalam (1/1)	(Turkey) Akgül, Taha (1/4)
2015	(Iran)	(Georgia (country)) Khinchegashvili, Vladimer (1/2)	(Azerbaijan) Aliyev, Haji (2/3)	(Italy) Chamizo, Frank (1/2)	(Russia) Gazimagomedov, Magomedrasul (1/2)	(United States) Burroughs, Jordan (4/7)	(Russia) Sadulaev, Abdulrashid (2/8)	(United States) Snyder, Kyle (1/6)	(Turkey) Akgül, Taha (2/4)
2016	(Russia)	(Georgia (country)) Khinchegashvili, Vladimer (2/2)	(United States) Stieber, Logan (1/1)	(Russia) Ramonov, Soslan (2/2)	(Russia) Kurbanaliev, Magomed (1/1)	(Iran) Yazdani, Hassan (1/4)	(Russia) Sadulaev, Abdulrashid (3/8)	(United States) Snyder, Kyle (2/6)	(Turkey) Akgül, Taha (3/4)
2017	(United States)	(Japan) Takahashi, Yuki (1/1)	(Azerbaijan) Aliyev, Haji (3/3)	(Georgia (country)) Iakobishvili, Zurabi (1/1)	(Italy) Chamizo, Frank (2/2)	(United States) Burroughs, Jordan (5/7)	(Iran) Yazdani, Hassan (2/4)	(United States) Snyder, Kyle (3/6)	(Georgia (country)) Petriashvili, Geno (1/4)

=== 2018–2019 ===
Year	Team	57 kg	61 kg	65 kg	70 kg	74 kg	79 kg	86 kg	92 kg	97 kg	125 kg
2018	(Russia)	(Russia) Uguev, Zaur (1/4)	(Cuba) Bonne, Yowlys (1/1)	(Japan) Otoguro, Takuto (1/2)	(Russia) Gazimagomedov, Magomedrasul (2/2)	(Russia) Sidakov, Zaurbek (1/4)	(United States) Dake, Kyle (1/5)	(United States) Taylor, David (1/4)	(United States) Cox, J'Den (1/2)	(Russia) Sadulaev, Abdulrashid (4/8)	(Georgia (country)) Petriashvili, Geno (2/4)
2019	(Russia)	(Russia) Uguev, Zaur (2/4)	(Georgia (country)) Lomtadze, Beka (1/1)	(Russia) Rashidov, Gadzhimurad (1/1)	(Russia) Baev, David (1/1)	(Russia) Sidakov, Zaurbek (2/4)	(United States) Dake, Kyle (2/5)	(Iran) Yazdani, Hassan (3/4)	(United States) Cox, J'Den (2/2)	(Russia) Sadulaev, Abdulrashid (5/8)	(Georgia (country)) Petriashvili, Geno (3/4)

=== 2021 ===
Year	Team	57 kg	65 kg	74 kg	86 kg	97 kg	125 kg
2021	(Russia)	(Russia) Uguev, Zaur (3/4)	(Japan) Otoguro, Takuto (2/2)	(Russia) Sidakov, Zaurbek (3/4)	(United States) Taylor, David (2/4)	(Russia) Sadulaev, Abdulrashid (6/8)	(United States) Steveson, Gable (1/1)

=== 2021–2025 ===
Year	Team	57 kg	61 kg	65 kg	70 kg	74 kg	79 kg	86 kg	92 kg	97 kg	125 kg
2021	(Russia)	(United States) Gilman, Thomas (1/1)	(Russia) Magomedov, Abasgadzhi (1/1)	(Russia) Shakhiev, Zagir (1/1)	(Poland) Gadzhiev, Magomedmurad (1/1)	(United States) Dake, Kyle (3/5)	(United States) Burroughs, Jordan (6/7)	(Iran) Yazdani, Hassan (4/4)	(Iran) Ghasempour, Kamran (1/2)	(Russia) Sadulaev, Abdulrashid (7/8)	(Iran) Zare, Amir Hossein (1/4)
2022	(United States)	(Albania) Abakarov, Zelimkhan (1/1)	(Japan) Higuchi, Rei (1/2)	(Iran) Amouzad, Rahman (1/2)	(Japan) Narikuni, Taishi (1/1)	(United States) Dake, Kyle (4/5)	(United States) Burroughs, Jordan (7/7)	(United States) Taylor, David (3/4)	(Iran) Ghasempour, Kamran (2/2)	(United States) Snyder, Kyle (4/6)	(Turkey) Akgül, Taha (4/4)
2023	(United States)	(Serbia) Mićić, Stevan (1/1)	(United States) Arujau, Vito (1/1)	(Hungary) Muszukajev, Iszmail (1/1)	(United States) Retherford, Zain (1/1)	Sidakov, Zaurbek (4/4)	Usmanov, Akhmed (1/1)	(United States) Taylor, David (4/4)	(Kazakhstan) Aitmukhan, Rizabek (1/1)	(Bahrain) Tazhudinov, Akhmed (1/2)	(Iran) Zare, Amir Hossein (2/4)
2024	(Japan)	(Japan) Higuchi, Rei (2/2)	(Japan) Ono, Masanosuke (1/1)	(Japan) Kiyooka, Kotaro (1/1)	(Kazakhstan) Kaipanov, Nurkozha (1/1)	(Uzbekistan) Zhamalov, Razambek (1/1)	Magomed Magomaev (1/1)	(Bulgaria) Ramazanov, Magomed (1/1)	Sadulaev, Abdulrashid (8/8)	(Bahrain) Tazhudinov, Akhmed (2/2)	(Georgia (country)) Petriashvili, Geno (4/4)
2024	(Japan)	(Japan) Higuchi, Rei (2/2)	(Japan) Ono, Masanosuke (1/1)	(Japan) Kiyooka, Kotaro (1/1)	(Kazakhstan) Kaipanov, Nurkozha (1/1)	(Uzbekistan) Zhamalov, Razambek (1/1)	Magomed Magomaev (1/1)	(Bulgaria) Ramazanov, Magomed (1/1)	Sadulaev, Abdulrashid (8/8)	(Bahrain) Tazhudinov, Akhmed (2/2)	(Georgia (country)) Petriashvili, Geno (4/4)
2025	(Iran)	(North Korea) Chong-song, Han (1/1)	Uguev, Zaur (4/4)	(Iran) Amouzad, Rahman (2/2)	(Japan) Aoyagi, Yoshinosuke (1/1)	(Japan) Takahashi, Kota (1/1)	(Greece) Kougioumtsidis, Georgios (1/1)	(United States) Valencia, Zahid (1/1)	(United States) Hidlay, Trent (1/1)	(United States) Snyder, Kyle (5/6)	(Iran) Zare, Amir Hossein (3/4)
2026	(United States)	(United States) Lee, Spencer (1/1)	(Iran) Javan, Ahmad (1/1)	(United States) Basset, Bo (1/1)	(Russia) Ibragomov, Ibragim (1/1)	(Russia) Sheriev, Inalbek (1/1)	(United States) Haines, Levi (1/1)	(United States) Dake, Kyle (5/5)	(Russia) Gadzhimagomedov, Amanula (1/1)	(United States) Snyder, Kyle (6/6)	(Iran) Zare, Amir Hossein (4/4)

== Individual Multiple-Time World Level Champions ==
=== 10 World Level Championships ===
(Soviet Union) Aleksandr Medved, 1962–1972

=== 9 World Level Championships ===
(Russia) Buvaisar Saitiev, 1995–2008

=== 8 World Level Championships ===
(Soviet Union) Sergei Beloglazov, 1980–1988

(Soviet Union) Arsen Fadzaev, 1983–1992

(Bulgaria) Valentin Yordanov, 1983–1996

(Russia) (Russia) (Russia) Abdulrashid Sadulaev, 2014–2024

=== 7 World Level Championships ===
(Soviet Union) Makharbek Khadartsev, 1986–1992

(United States) Jordan Burroughs, 2011–2022

=== 6 World Level Championships ===
(Iran) Abdollah Movahed, 1965–1970

(Soviet Union) Levan Tediashvili, 1971–1976

(Soviet Union) Soslan Andiyev, 1973–1980

(United States) John Smith, 1987–1992

(Soviet Union) (Russia) Leri Khabelov, 1985–1993

(Russia) Khadzhimurat Gatsalov, 2004–2013

(United States) Kyle Snyder, 2015–2026

=== 5 World Level Championships ===
(Turkey) Mustafa Dağıstanlı, 1954–1960

(Soviet Union) Aleksandr Ivanitsky, 1962–1966

(Soviet Union) Ali Aliev, 1959–1967

(Japan) Yuji Takada, 1974–1979

(Soviet Union) Vladimir Yumin, 1974–1979

(United States) Bruce Baumgartner, 1984–1995

(United States) Kyle Dake, 2018–2026

== Team Championships ==
The list below includes unofficial championships won during the Olympic Games, although no official team statistics are kept during Olympic years.

=== 47 World Level Championships ===
(Soviet Union) / / (Russia) / (Russia) / (Russia) / (Russia) 1959–2021

=== 7 World Level Championships ===
(United States) 1904–2026

=== 10 World Level Championships ===
(Iran) / (Iran) / (Iran) 1956–2026

=== 7 World Level Championships ===
(Turkey) 1948–1994

=== 4 World Level Championships ===
(Japan) 1964–2024

=== 2 World Level Championships ===
(Finland) 1920–1928

=== 1 World Level Championship ===
(United Kingdom) 1908

(Hungary) 1936

(Sweden) 1952

(Georgia (country)) 2003

== See also ==
- List of Cadet, Junior, and Espoir World Champions in men's freestyle wrestling
- United States results in men's freestyle wrestling
- Soviet and Russian results in men's freestyle wrestling
- Iranian results in men's freestyle wrestling
- List of World and Olympic Champions in Greco-Roman wrestling
- List of World and Olympic Champions in women's freestyle wrestling
