= Wrestling at the 1976 Summer Olympics – Men's freestyle 57 kg =

Men's freestyle 57 kg at the Games of the XXI Olympiad
- Venue: Maurice Richard Arena
- Dates: 27–31 July 1976
- Competitors: 21 from 21 nations

Medalists
| 1st place, gold medalist(s) | | Vladimir Yumin | Soviet Union |
| 2nd place, silver medalist(s) | | Hans-Dieter Brüchert | East Germany |
| 3rd place, bronze medalist(s) | | Masao Arai | Japan |

The Men's Freestyle 57 kg at the 1976 Summer Olympics as part of the wrestling program were held at the Maurice Richard Arena.

== Medalists ==
| Gold | Vladimir Yumin; Soviet Union |
| Silver | Hans-Dieter Brüchert; East Germany |
| Bronze | Masao Arai; Japan |

== Tournament results ==
The competition used a form of negative points tournament, with negative points given for any result short of a fall. Accumulation of 6 negative points eliminated the loser wrestler. When only three wrestlers remain, a special final round is used to determine the order of the medals.

Legend

- TF — Won by Fall
- IN — Won by Opponent Injury
- DQ — Won by Passivity
- D1 — Won by Passivity, the winner is passive too
- D2 — Both wrestlers lost by Passivity
- FF — Won by Forfeit
- DNA — Did not appear
- TPP — Total penalty points
- MPP — Match penalty points

Penalties

- 0 — Won by Fall, Technical Superiority, Passivity, Injury and Forfeit
- 0.5 — Won by Points, 8-11 points difference
- 1 — Won by Points, 1-7 points difference
- 2 — Won by Passivity, the winner is passive too
- 3 — Lost by Points, 1-7 points difference
- 3.5 — Lost by Points, 8-11 points difference
- 4 — Lost by Fall, Technical Superiority, Passivity, Injury and Forfeit

=== Round 1 ===
| TPP | MPP | | Score | | MPP | TPP |
|---|---|---|---|---|---|---|
| 0 | 0 | Joe Corso (USA) | 20 - 8 | Allah Ditta (PAK) | 4 | 4 |
| 1 | 1 | Masao Arai (JPN) | 13 - 9 | Miho Dukov (BUL) | 3 | 3 |
| 4 | 4 | Gordon Smith (AUS) | TF / 4:10 | Gigel Anghel (ROU) | 0 | 0 |
| 0 | 0 | Ramezan Kheder (IRI) | 23 - 5 | Michael Barry (CAN) | 4 | 4 |
| 3 | 3 | Jeong Yun-ok (KOR) | 26 - 28 | Georgios Hatziioannidis (GRE) | 1 | 1 |
| 4 | 4 | Barry Oldridge (NZL) | 0 - 24 | Risto Darlev (YUG) | 0 | 0 |
| 0 | 0 | Moises López (MEX) | TF / 5:01 | Amrik Singh Gill (GBR) | 4 | 4 |
| 3 | 3 | Jorge Ramos (CUB) | 6 - 13 | László Klinga (HUN) | 1 | 1 |
| 0 | 0 | Hans-Dieter Brüchert (GDR) | 38 - 7 | Megdiin Khoilogdorj (MGL) | 4 | 4 |
| 0 | 0 | Vladimir Yumin (URS) | 20 - 5 | Li Ho-Pyong (PRK) | 4 | 4 |
| 0 | | Zbigniew Żedzicki (POL) | | Bye | | |

=== Round 2 ===
| TPP | MPP | | Score | | MPP | TPP |
|---|---|---|---|---|---|---|
| 0 | 0 | Zbigniew Żedzicki (POL) | TF / 1:02 | Joe Corso (USA) | 4 | 4 |
| 8 | 4 | Allah Ditta (PAK) | TF / 1:56 | Masao Arai (JPN) | 0 | 1 |
| 3 | 0 | Miho Dukov (BUL) | TF / 1:33 | Gordon Smith (AUS) | 4 | 8 |
| 3 | 3 | Gigel Anghel (ROU) | 15 - 18 | Ramezan Kheder (IRI) | 1 | 1 |
| 7 | 3 | Michael Barry (CAN) | 9 - 11 | Jung Youn-Ok (KOR) | 1 | 4 |
| 1 | 0 | Georgios Hatziioannidis (GRE) | TF / 2:29 | Barry Oldridge (NZL) | 4 | 8 |
| 0 | 0 | Risto Darlev (YUG) | TF / 1:01 | Moises López (MEX) | 4 | 4 |
| 8 | 4 | Amrik Singh Gill (GBR) | 6 - 19 | Jorge Ramos (CUB) | 0 | 3 |
| 5 | 4 | László Klinga (HUN) | TF / 5:22 | Hans-Dieter Brüchert (GDR) | 0 | 0 |
| 4 | 0 | Megdiin Khoilogdorj (MGL) | TF / 4:49 | Vladimir Yumin (URS) | 4 | 4 |
| 0 | | Li Ho-Pyong (PRK) | | Bye | | |

=== Round 3 ===
| TPP | MPP | | Score | | MPP | TPP |
|---|---|---|---|---|---|---|
| 5 | 1 | Li Ho-Pyong (PRK) | 13 - 10 | Zbigniew Żedzicki (POL) | 3 | 3 |
| 8 | 4 | Joe Corso (USA) | TF / 8:54 | Masao Arai (JPN) | 0 | 1 |
| 3 | 0 | Miho Dukov (BUL) | 32 - 1 | Gigel Anghel (ROU) | 4 | 7 |
| 1 | 0 | Ramezan Kheder (IRI) | 24 - 9 | Jung Youn-Ok (KOR) | 4 | 8 |
| 1 | 0 | Georgios Hatziioannidis (GRE) | TF / 6:47 | Risto Darlev (YUG) | 4 | 4 |
| 8 | 4 | Moises López (MEX) | DQ / 7:17 | Jorge Ramos (CUB) | 0 | 3 |
| 9 | 4 | László Klinga (HUN) | TF / 2:41 | Megdiin Khoilogdorj (MGL) | 0 | 4 |
| 3 | 3 | Hans-Dieter Brüchert (GDR) | 5 - 10 | Vladimir Yumin (URS) | 1 | 5 |

=== Round 4 ===
| TPP | MPP | | Score | | MPP | TPP |
|---|---|---|---|---|---|---|
| 8.5 | 3.5 | Li Ho-Pyong (PRK) | 7 - 18 | Masao Arai (JPN) | 0.5 | 1.5 |
| 6 | 3 | Zbigniew Żedzicki (POL) | 7 - 14 | Miho Dukov (BUL) | 1 | 4 |
| 1 | 0 | Ramezan Kheder (IRI) | 26 - 8 | Georgios Hatziioannidis (GRE) | 4 | 5 |
| 8 | 4 | Risto Darlev (YUG) | TF / 7:35 | Hans-Dieter Brüchert (GDR) | 0 | 3 |
| 7 | 4 | Jorge Ramos (CUB) | TF / 4:15 | Megdiin Khoilogdorj (MGL) | 0 | 4 |
| 5 | | Vladimir Yumin (URS) | | Bye | | |

=== Round 5 ===
| TPP | MPP | | Score | | MPP | TPP |
|---|---|---|---|---|---|---|
| 6 | 1 | Vladimir Yumin (URS) | 11 - 5 | Masao Arai (JPN) | 3 | 4.5 |
| 5 | 1 | Miho Dukov (BUL) | 12 - 8 | Ramezan Kheder (IRI) | 3 | 4 |
| 8.5 | 3.5 | Georgios Hatziioannidis (GRE) | 11 - 22 | Hans-Dieter Brüchert (GDR) | 0.5 | 3.5 |
| 4 | | Megdiin Khoilogdorj (MGL) | | Bye | | |

=== Round 6 ===
| TPP | MPP | | Score | | MPP | TPP |
|---|---|---|---|---|---|---|
| 8 | 4 | Megdiin Khoilogdorj (MGL) | 3 - 22 | Masao Arai (JPN) | 0 | 4.5 |
| 7 | 1 | Vladimir Yumin (URS) | 9 - 4 | Miho Dukov (BUL) | 3 | 8 |
| 8 | 4 | Ramezan Kheder (IRI) | TF / 8:42 | Hans-Dieter Brüchert (GDR) | 0 | 3.5 |

=== Final ===
Results from the preliminary round are carried forward into the final (shown in yellow).

| TPP | MPP | | Score | | MPP | TPP |
|---|---|---|---|---|---|---|
| | 3 | Hans-Dieter Brüchert (GDR) | 5 - 10 | Vladimir Yumin (URS) | 1 | |
| 2 | 1 | Vladimir Yumin (URS) | 11 - 5 | Masao Arai (JPN) | 3 | |
| 6 | 3 | Masao Arai (JPN) | 7 - 10 | Hans-Dieter Brüchert (GDR) | 1 | 4 |

== Final standings ==
1. Vladimir Yumin (URS)
2. Hans-Dieter Brüchert (GDR)
3. Masao Arai (JPN)
4. Miho Dukov (BUL)
5. Ramezan Kheder (IRI)
6. Megdiin Khoilogdorj (MGL)
7. Georgios Hatziioannidis (GRE)
8. Zbigniew Żedzicki (POL)
