= Allah Ditta (wrestler) =

Pakistani former Olympic wrestler

Personal information
- Full name: Allah Ditta
- Nationality: Pakistan
- Born: 22 October 1947 (age 78)
- Height: 171 cm (5 ft 7 in)
- Weight: 52 kg (115 lb)

Sport
- Country: Pakistan
- Sport: Wrestling
- Event: Freestyle

Allah Ditta (born 22 October 1947) is a Pakistani former Olympic wrestler.

Ditta first competed internationally at the 1972 Summer Olympics in Munich, West Germany. Representing Pakistan in the men's freestyle 57 kg event, he lost his first round match to Cuban Jorge Ramos and then was eliminated in the second round after losing to Risto Darlev of Yugoslavia. Four years later at 1976 Summer Olympics in Montreal, Quebec, Canada, Ditta in the men's freestyle 57 kg event, lost his first round match to American Joe Corso and then was eliminated in the second round after losing to the eventual bronze medalist, Masao Arai of Japan.
