= Megdiin Khoilogdorj =

Mongolian wrestler

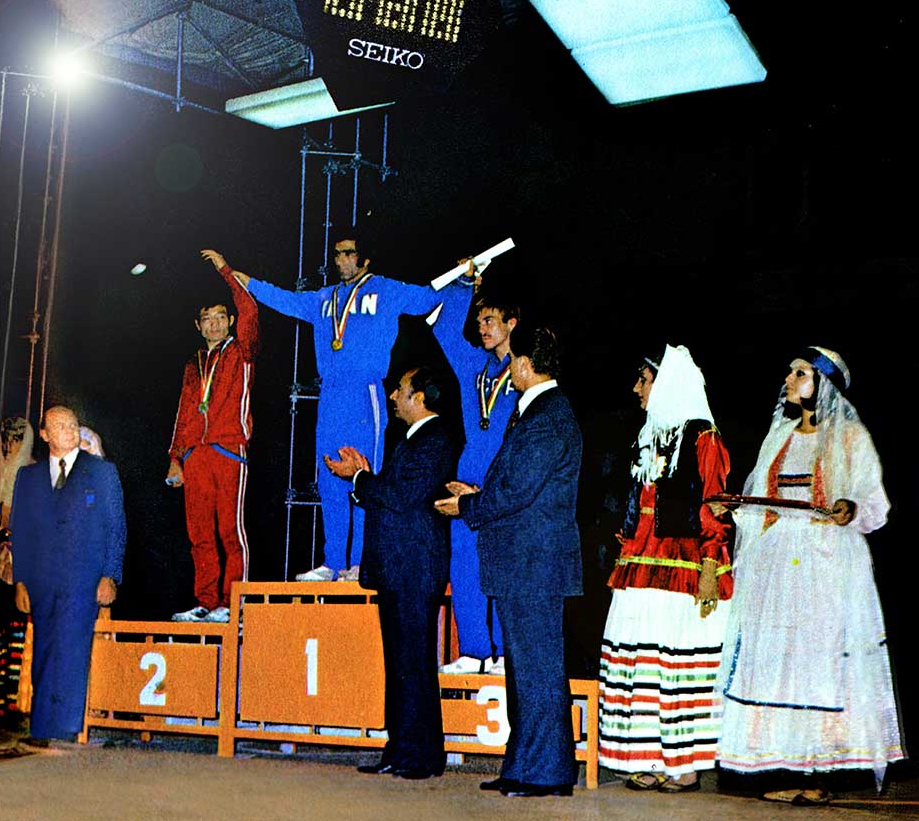
- Megdiin Khoilogdorj (on the 2nd place) at 1973 Tehran

Personal information
- Native name: Мэгдийн Хойлогдорж
- Nationality: Mongolia
- Born: 7 May 1948 (age 78) Bogd, Övörkhangai, Mongolia
- Height: 167 cm (5 ft 6 in)

Sport
- Country: Mongolia
- Sport: Wrestling
- Weight class: 57 kg
- Event: Freestyle
Medal record
Men's freestyle wrestling
Representing Mongolia
World Championships
Silver medal – second place	1973 Tehran	57 kg
Bronze medal – third place	1971 Sofia	57 kg

Megdiin Khoilogdorj (born 7 May 1948) is a Mongolian former wrestler who competed in the 1972 Summer Olympics and in the 1976 Summer Olympics.

== Olympic results ==
1976 (as a men's freestyle 57 kg)

- Lost by points to Hans-Dieter Brüchert of East Germany.
- Won by pinfall over eventual Olympic and multiple World Champion Vladimir Yumin of Soviet Union.
- Won by pinfall over 1972 Olympic and two-time European medalist László Klinga of Hungary.
- Won by pinfall over 1975 Pan American Games Champion Jorge Ramos of Cuba.
- Lost by points to Masao Arai of Japan.

Megdiin Khoilogdorj placed sixth at the 1976 Summer Olympics:

- Gold - Vladimir Yumin of Soviet Union.
- Silver - Hans-Dieter Brüchert of East Germany.
- Bronze - Masao Arai of Japan.
- 4. Miho Dukov of Bulgaria.
- 5. Ramezan Kheder of Iran.
- 6. Megdiin Khoilogdorj of Mongolia.
