= Wrestling at the 1980 Summer Olympics – Men's freestyle 62 kg =

Men's freestyle 62 kg at the Games of the XXII Olympiad
- Venue: Central Sports Club of the Army
- Dates: 27–29 July 1980
- Competitors: 13 from 13 nations

Medalists
1st place, gold medalist(s)		Magomedgasan Abushev	Soviet Union
2nd place, silver medalist(s)		Miho Dukov	Bulgaria
3rd place, bronze medalist(s)		Georgios Hatziioannidis	Greece

The Men's Freestyle 62 kg at the 1980 Summer Olympics as part of the wrestling program were held at the Athletics Fieldhouse, Central Sports Club of the Army.

== Medalists ==
Gold	Magomedgasan Abushev; Soviet Union
Silver	Miho Dukov; Bulgaria
Bronze	Georgios Hatziioannidis; Greece

== Tournament results ==
The competition used a form of negative points tournament, with negative points given for any result short of a fall. Accumulation of 6 negative points eliminated the loser wrestler. When only three wrestlers remain, a special final round is used to determine the order of the medals.

Legend

- TF — Won by Fall
- IN — Won by Opponent Injury
- DQ — Won by Passivity
- D1 — Won by Passivity, the winner is passive too
- D2 — Both wrestlers lost by Passivity
- FF — Won by Forfeit
- DNA — Did not appear
- TPP — Total penalty points
- MPP — Match penalty points

Penalties

- 0 — Won by Fall, Technical Superiority, Passivity, Injury and Forfeit
- 0.5 — Won by Points, 8-11 points difference
- 1 — Won by Points, 1-7 points difference
- 2 — Won by Passivity, the winner is passive too
- 3 — Lost by Points, 1-7 points difference
- 3.5 — Lost by Points, 8-11 points difference
- 4 — Lost by Fall, Technical Superiority, Passivity, Injury and Forfeit

=== Round 1 ===
TPP	MPP		Score		MPP	TPP
0	0	Magomedgasan Abushev (URS)	TF / 3:33	Augustine Atasie (NGR)	4	4
0	0	Ölziibayaryn Nasanjargal (MGL)	DQ / 7:30	Adnan Kudmani (SYR)	4	4
4	4	Jan Szymański (POL)	TF / 5:27	Miho Dukov (BUL)	0	0
0	0	Raúl Cascaret (CUB)	TF / 4:57	Zoltán Szalontai (HUN)	4	4
0	0	Phí Hữu Tình (VIE)	DQ / 7:52	Victor Kede Manga (CMR)	4	4
1	1	Georgios Hatziioannidis (GRE)	17 - 10	Brian Aspen (GBR)	3	3
0		Aurel Şuteu (ROU)		Bye		

=== Round 2 ===
TPP	MPP		Score		MPP	TPP
4	4	Aurel Şuteu (ROU)	2 - 15	Magomedgasan Abushev (URS)	0	0
8	4	Augustine Atasie (NGR)	1 - 16	Ölziibayaryn Nasanjargal (MGL)	0	0
8	4	Adnan Kudmani (SYR)	TF / 2:18	Jan Szymański (POL)	0	4
1	1	Miho Dukov (BUL)	8 - 8	Raúl Cascaret (CUB)	3	3
4	0	Zoltán Szalontai (HUN)	TF / 4:24	Phi Huu Tinh (VIE)	4	4
8	4	Victor Kede Manga (CMR)	TF / 0:58	Georgios Hatziioannidis (GRE)	0	1
3		Brian Aspen (GBR)		Bye		

=== Round 3 ===
TPP	MPP		Score		MPP	TPP
6.5	3.5	Brian Aspen (GBR)	4 - 15	Aurel Şuteu (ROU)	0.5	4.5
1	1	Magomedgasan Abushev (URS)	8 - 4	Ölziibayaryn Nasanjargal (MGL)	3	3
8	4	Jan Szymański (POL)	TF / 8:58	Raúl Cascaret (CUB)	0	3
1.5	0.5	Miho Dukov (BUL)	16 - 8	Zoltán Szalontai (HUN)	3.5	7.5
8	4	Phi Huu Tinh (VIE)	DQ / 5:06	Georgios Hatziioannidis (GRE)	0	1

=== Round 4 ===
TPP	MPP		Score		MPP	TPP
5.5	1	Aurel Şuteu (ROU)	10 - 5	Ölziibayaryn Nasanjargal (MGL)	3	6
2	1	Magomedgasan Abushev (URS)	4 - 2	Miho Dukov (BUL)	3	4.5
3	0	Raúl Cascaret (CUB)	18 - 5	Georgios Hatziioannidis (GRE)	4	5

=== Round 5 ===
TPP	MPP		Score		MPP	TPP
8.5	3	Aurel Şuteu (ROU)	3 - 10	Miho Dukov (BUL)	1	5.5
2.5	0.5	Magomedgasan Abushev (URS)	9 - 1	Raúl Cascaret (CUB)	3.5	6.5
5		Georgios Hatziioannidis (GRE)		Bye		

=== Final ===
Results from the preliminary round are carried forward into the final (shown in yellow).

TPP	MPP		Score		MPP	TPP
	1	Magomedgasan Abushev (URS)	4 - 2	Miho Dukov (BUL)	3	
	3.5	Georgios Hatziioannidis (GRE)	3 - 14	Magomedgasan Abushev (URS)	0.5	1.5
3	0	Miho Dukov (BUL)	TF / 2:04	Georgios Hatziioannidis (GRE)	4	7.5

== Final standings ==
1. Magomedgasan Abushev (URS)
2. Miho Dukov (BUL)
3. Georgios Hatziioannidis (GRE)
4. Raúl Cascaret (CUB)
5. Aurel Şuteu (ROU)
6. Ölziibayaryn Nasanjargal (MGL)
7. Brian Aspen (GBR)
8. Zoltán Szalontai (HUN)
