= Wrestling at the 1992 Summer Olympics – Men's freestyle 48 kg =

Men's freestyle 48 kg at the Games of the XXV Olympiad
- Venue: Institut Nacional d'Educació Física de Catalunya
- Dates: 4–6 August 1992
- Competitors: 19 from 19 nations

Medalists
| 1st place, gold medalist(s) | | Kim Il | North Korea |
| 2nd place, silver medalist(s) | | Kim Jong-shin | South Korea |
| 3rd place, bronze medalist(s) | | Vugar Orujov | Unified Team |

The Men's Freestyle 48 kilograms at the 1992 Summer Olympics as part of the wrestling program were held at the Institut Nacional d'Educació Física de Catalunya from August 4 to August 6. The wrestlers are divided into 2 groups. The winner of each group decided by a double-elimination system.

== Results ==
Legend

- WO — Won by walkover

=== Elimination A ===
==== Round 1 ====
| | Score | | CP |
|---|---|---|---|
| Nader Rahmati (IRI) | 3–6 | Chen Zhengbin (CHN) | 1–3 PP |
| Vincent Pangelinan (GUM) | 0–16 | Tim Vanni (USA) | 0–4 ST |
| Francisco Sánchez (ESP) | 0–15 | Tserenbaataryn Khosbayar (MGL) | 0–4 ST |
| Kim Jong-shin (KOR) | 4–2 | Romica Rașovan (ROM) | 3–1 PP |
| Amos Ojo (NGR) | 4–7 | Tom Petryshen (CAN) | 1–3 PP |

==== Round 2 ====
| | Score | | CP |
|---|---|---|---|
| Nader Rahmati (IRI) | 11–0 Fall | Vincent Pangelinan (GUM) | 4–0 TO |
| Chen Zhengbin (CHN) | 2–3 | Tim Vanni (USA) | 1–3 PP |
| Francisco Sánchez (ESP) | 1–17 | Kim Jong-shin (KOR) | 0–4 ST |
| Tserenbaataryn Khosbayar (MGL) | 19–4 Fall | Amos Ojo (NGR) | 4–0 TO |
| Romica Rașovan (ROM) | 10–0 | Tom Petryshen (CAN) | 3–0 PO |

==== Round 3 ====
| | Score | | CP |
|---|---|---|---|
| Nader Rahmati (IRI) | 7–9 | Tim Vanni (USA) | 1–3 PP |
| Chen Zhengbin (CHN) | 0–1 | Kim Jong-shin (KOR) | 0–3 PO |
| Tserenbaataryn Khosbayar (MGL) | 7–9 | Romica Rașovan (ROM) | 1–3 PP |
| Tom Petryshen (CAN) | | Bye | |

==== Round 4 ====
| | Score | | CP |
|---|---|---|---|
| Tom Petryshen (CAN) | 0–5 | Tim Vanni (USA) | 0–3 PO |
| Tserenbaataryn Khosbayar (MGL) | 2–6 | Kim Jong-shin (KOR) | 1–3 PP |
| Romica Rașovan (ROM) | | Bye | |

==== Round 5 ====
| | Score | | CP |
|---|---|---|---|
| Romica Rașovan (ROM) | 10–7 | Tim Vanni (USA) | 3–1 PP |
| Kim Jong-shin (KOR) | | Bye | |

==== Round 6 ====
| | Score | | CP |
|---|---|---|---|
| Kim Jong-shin (KOR) | 5–2 | Tim Vanni (USA) | 3–1 PP |
| Romica Rașovan (ROM) | | Bye | |

==== Summary ====
| Pos | Athlete | Pld | W | L | R | CP | TP |
|---|---|---|---|---|---|---|---|
| 1 | Kim Jong-shin (KOR) | 5 | 5 | 0 | X (Note: Classification points: KOR 6, ROM 4, USA 2) | 16 | 33 |
| 2 | Romica Rașovan (ROM) | 4 | 3 | 1 | X | 10 | 31 |
| 3 | Tim Vanni (USA) | 6 | 4 | 2 | X | 15 | 42 |
| 4 | Tserenbaataryn Khosbayar (MGL) | 4 | 2 | 2 | 4 | 10 | 43 |
| 5 | Tom Petryshen (CAN) | 3 | 1 | 2 | 4 | 3 | 7 |
| — | Nader Rahmati (IRI) | 3 | 1 | 2 | 3 | 6 | 21 |
| — | Chen Zhengbin (CHN) | 3 | 1 | 2 | 3 | 4 | 8 |
| — | Amos Ojo (NGR) | 2 | 0 | 2 | 2 | 1 | 8 |
| — | Francisco Sánchez (ESP) | 2 | 0 | 2 | 2 | 0 | 1 |
| — | Vincent Pangelinan (GUM) | 2 | 0 | 2 | 2 | 0 | 0 |

Source: Official Report

=== Elimination B ===
==== Round 1 ====
| | Score | | CP |
|---|---|---|---|
| Stanisław Szostecki (POL) | 7–3 | Fariborz Besarati (SWE) | 3–1 PP |
| Vugar Orujov (EUN) | 5–9 | Kim Il (PRK) | 1–3 PP |
| Aldo Martínez (CUB) | 3–2 | Marian Avramov (BUL) | 3–1 PP |
| László Óváry (HUN) | 7–5 | Chaouki Sammari (TUN) | 3–1 PP |
| Reiner Heugabel (GER) | | Bye | |

==== Round 2 ====
| | Score | | CP |
|---|---|---|---|
| Reiner Heugabel (GER) | 9–0 | Stanisław Szostecki (POL) | 3–0 PO |
| Fariborz Besarati (SWE) | 2–8 | Vugar Orujov (EUN) | 1–3 PP |
| Kim Il (PRK) | 7–6 | Aldo Martínez (CUB) | 3–1 PP |
| Marian Avramov (BUL) | 7–2 | László Óváry (HUN) | 3–1 PP |
| Chaouki Sammari (TUN) | | Bye | |

==== Round 3 ====
| | Score | | CP |
|---|---|---|---|
| Chaouki Sammari (TUN) | 0–3 Fall | Reiner Heugabel (GER) | 0–4 TO |
| Stanisław Szostecki (POL) | 0–12 Fall | Vugar Orujov (EUN) | 0–4 TO |
| Kim Il (PRK) | 3–0 | Marian Avramov (BUL) | 3–0 PO |
| Aldo Martínez (CUB) | 20–5 | László Óváry (HUN) | 4–0 ST |

==== Round 4 ====
| | Score | | CP |
|---|---|---|---|
| Reiner Heugabel (GER) | 4–10 Fall | Kim Il (PRK) | 0–4 TO |
| Vugar Orujov (EUN) | 12–5 | Aldo Martínez (CUB) | 3–1 PP |

==== Round 5 ====
| | Score | | CP |
|---|---|---|---|
| Reiner Heugabel (GER) | 0–1 | Vugar Orujov (EUN) | 0–3 PO |
| Kim Il (PRK) | | Bye | |

==== Summary ====
| Pos | Athlete | Pld | W | L | R | CP | TP |
|---|---|---|---|---|---|---|---|
| 1 | Kim Il (PRK) | 4 | 4 | 0 | X (Note: Classification points: PRK 7, EUN 4, GER 0) | 13 | 29 |
| 2 | Vugar Orujov (EUN) | 5 | 4 | 1 | X | 14 | 38 |
| 3 | Reiner Heugabel (GER) | 4 | 2 | 2 | X | 7 | 16 |
| 4 | Aldo Martínez (CUB) | 4 | 2 | 2 | 4 | 9 | 34 |
| — | Marian Avramov (BUL) | 3 | 1 | 2 | 3 | 4 | 9 |
| 5 | László Óváry (HUN) | 3 | 1 | 2 | 3 | 4 | 14 |
| — | Stanisław Szostecki (POL) | 3 | 1 | 2 | 3 | 3 | 7 |
| — | Chaouki Sammari (TUN) | 2 | 0 | 2 | 3 | 1 | 5 |
| — | Fariborz Besarati (SWE) | 2 | 0 | 2 | 2 | 2 | 5 |

Source: Official Report

=== Finals ===
| | Score | | CP |
9th place match
| Tom Petryshen (CAN) | WO | László Óváry (HUN) | |
7th place match
| Tserenbaataryn Khosbayar (MGL) | WO | Aldo Martínez (CUB) | |
5th place match
| Tim Vanni (USA) | 1–0 | Reiner Heugabel (GER) | 3–0 PO |
Bronze medal match
| Romica Rașovan (ROM) | 1–2 | Vugar Orujov (EUN) | 1–3 PP |
Gold medal match
| Kim Jong-shin (KOR) | 1–4 | Kim Il (PRK) | 1–3 PP |

== Final standing ==
| Rank | Athlete |
|---|---|
| 1st place, gold medalist(s) | Kim Il (PRK) |
| 2nd place, silver medalist(s) | Kim Jong-shin (KOR) |
| 3rd place, bronze medalist(s) | Vugar Orujov (EUN) |
| 4 | Romica Rașovan (ROM) |
| 5 | Tim Vanni (USA) |
| 6 | Reiner Heugabel (GER) |
| 7 | Aldo Martínez (CUB) |
| 8 | Tserenbaataryn Khosbayar (MGL) |
| 9 | Tom Petryshen (CAN) |
| 10 | László Óváry (HUN) |
