= 1993 Asian Wrestling Championships =

Wrestling competition in Ulaanbaatar, Mongolia

Freestyle
- Host city: Ulaanbaatar, Mongolia
- Dates: 16–18 April 1993

Greco-Roman
- Host city: Hiroshima, Japan
- Dates: 23–25 April 1993
- Stadium: Higashi-Hiroshima Sports Park

Champions
- Freestyle: Iran
- Greco-Roman: South Korea

The following is the final results of the 1993 Asian Wrestling Championships.

== Medal table ==
Rank	Nation	Gold	Silver	Bronze	Total
1	South Korea	7	4	1	12
2	Iran	6	3	5	14
3	Mongolia	2	3	3	8
4	North Korea	2	1	2	5
5	Kazakhstan	1	3	3	7
6	China	1	2	2	5
7	India	1	0	0	1
8	Japan	0	4	4	8
Totals (8 entries)		20	20	20	60

== Team ranking ==
Rank	Men's freestyle		Men's Greco-Roman	
Rank	Team	Points	Team	Points
1	Iran	48	South Korea	90
2	Mongolia	41	Iran	73
3	North Korea	31	Japan	70
4	South Korea	25	China	64
5	Japan	23	Kazakhstan	57

== Medal summary ==
=== Men's freestyle ===
Event	Gold	Silver	Bronze
48 kg	Kim Il; North Korea	Tserenbaataryn Khosbayar; Mongolia	Chen Zhengbin; China
52 kg	Luvsan-Ishiin Sergelenbaatar; Mongolia	Ri Hak-son; North Korea	Nasser Zeinalnia; Iran
57 kg	Tserenbaataryn Tsogtbayar; Mongolia	Oveis Mallah; Iran	Ri Yong-sam; North Korea
62 kg	Kim Gwang-chol; North Korea	Takahiro Wada; Japan	Alireza Rezaeimanesh; Iran
68 kg	Ko Young-ho; South Korea	Ali Akbarnejad; Iran	Takumi Adachi; Japan
74 kg	Behrouz Yari; Iran	Park Jang-soon; South Korea	Agvaansamdangiin Sükhbat; Mongolia
82 kg	Amir Reza Khadem; Iran	Bayanmönkhiin Gantogtokh; Mongolia	Yang Hyung-mo; South Korea
90 kg	Rasoul Khadem; Iran	Islam Bayramukov; Kazakhstan	Puntsagiin Sükhbat; Mongolia
100 kg	Abbas Jadidi; Iran	Bat-Erdeniin Battogtokh; Mongolia	Sergey Nepomnyashchiy; Kazakhstan
130 kg	Ayoub Baninosrat; Iran	Wang Chunguang; China	Tsedendambyn Bayarsaikhan; Mongolia

=== Men's Greco-Roman ===
Event	Gold	Silver	Bronze
48 kg	Pappu Yadav; India	Sim Kwon-ho; South Korea	Masatsune Sasaki; Japan
52 kg	Min Kyung-gab; South Korea	Koji Uchi; Japan	Han Sang-jik; North Korea
57 kg	Lee Tae-ho; South Korea	Akhmetulla Nurov; Kazakhstan	Sheng Zetian; China
62 kg	Ahad Pazaj; Iran	Hu Guohong; China	Marat Maltekbayev; Kazakhstan
68 kg	Kim Young-il; South Korea	Abdollah Chamangoli; Iran	Takumi Mori; Japan
74 kg	Cha Myung-shin; South Korea	Hiromichi Ito; Japan	Ahad Javansalehi; Iran
82 kg	Park Myung-suk; South Korea	Takahiro Mukai; Japan	Bakhtiyar Baiseitov; Kazakhstan
90 kg	Sergey Matviyenko; Kazakhstan	Eom Jin-han; South Korea	Yasutoshi Moriyama; Japan
100 kg	Song Sung-il; South Korea	Igor Dupikov; Kazakhstan	Jaber Abbaszadeh; Iran
130 kg	Hu Riga; China	Yang Young-jin; South Korea	Abdollah Azizi; Iran
