= Dukov =

Dukov (Cyrillic: Дуков) is a Slavic masculine surname; its feminine counterpart is Dukova. It may refer to the following notable people:

- Andrei Dukov (born 1987), Romanian freestyle wrestler
- Miho Dukov (born 1955), Bulgarian wrestler
