= Șuteu =

Șuteu is a Romanian surname. Notable people with the surname include:

- Aurel Şuteu (born 1957), Romanian wrestler
- Corina Șuteu (born 1961), Romanian consultant and politician
