= 1992 Asian Wrestling Championships =

- Host city: Tehran, Iran
- Dates: 7–10 April 1992
- Stadium: Azadi Indoor Stadium

Champions
- Freestyle: Iran
- Greco-Roman: South Korea

The 1992 Asian Wrestling Championships were held in Tehran, Iran. The event took place from April 7 to April 10, 1992.

== Medal table ==
Rank	Nation	Gold	Silver	Bronze	Total
1	Iran	8	6	3	17
2	North Korea	4	0	0	4
3	South Korea	3	4	8	15
4	China	2	2	2	6
5	Japan	1	4	5	10
6	Mongolia	1	2	1	4
7	Syria	1	0	1	2
8	India	0	2	0	2
Totals (8 entries)		20	20	20	60

== Team ranking ==
Rank	Men's freestyle		Men's Greco-Roman	
Rank	Team	Points	Team	Points
1	Iran	92	South Korea	87
2	South Korea	72	Iran	86
3	Japan	68	China	64
4	India	54	Japan	57
5	China	52	Chinese Taipei	46
6	Mongolia	46	India	30

== Medal summary ==
=== Men's freestyle ===
Event	Gold	Silver	Bronze
48 kg	Kim Il; North Korea	Tserenbaataryn Khosbayar; Mongolia	Chen Zhengbin; China
52 kg	Ri Hak-son; North Korea	Majid Torkan; Iran	Kim Sun-hak; South Korea
57 kg	Ri Yong-sam; North Korea	Oveis Mallah; Iran	Kim Jong-oh; South Korea
62 kg	Kim Gwang-chol; North Korea	Mohammad Zolfaghari; Iran	Shin Sang-kyu; South Korea
68 kg	Hwang Sang-ho; South Korea	Akbar Fallah; Iran	Ahmad Al-Osta; Syria
74 kg	Amir Reza Khadem; Iran	Yoshihiko Hara; Japan	Lodoin Enkhbayar; Mongolia
82 kg	Rasoul Khadem; Iran	Nergüin Tümennast; Mongolia	Atsushi Ito; Japan
90 kg	Puntsagiin Sükhbat; Mongolia	Abbas Jadidi; Iran	Akira Ota; Japan
100 kg	Kazem Gholami; Iran	Lee Ho-jik; South Korea	Manabu Nakanishi; Japan
130 kg	Alireza Lorestani; Iran	Wang Chunguang; China	Tamon Honda; Japan

=== Men's Greco-Roman ===
Event	Gold	Silver	Bronze
48 kg	Masanori Ohashi; Japan	Pappu Yadav; India	Sim Kwon-ho; South Korea
52 kg	Khaled Al-Faraj; Syria	Kim Soo-young; South Korea	Majid Jahandideh; Iran
57 kg	Sheng Zetian; China	Shi Jin-chul; South Korea	Hamid Samadi; Iran
62 kg	Ahad Pazaj; Iran	Mohan Ramchandra Patil; India	Kim Dong-bum; South Korea
68 kg	Abdollah Chamangoli; Iran	Takumi Mori; Japan	Kim Yong-jae; South Korea
74 kg	Ahad Javansalehi; Iran	Wei Qingkun; China	Han Chee-ho; South Korea
82 kg	Park Myung-suk; South Korea	Ali Khoshtinat; Iran	Li Daxin; China
90 kg	Hassan Babak; Iran	Park Hyun-seo; South Korea	Yasutoshi Moriyama; Japan
100 kg	Song Sung-il; South Korea	Takashi Nonomura; Japan	Jaber Abbaszadeh; Iran
130 kg	Tian Lei; China	Kenichi Suzuki; Japan	Yang Young-jin; South Korea
