= Phí Hữu Tình =

Vietnamese wrestler

Personal information
- Nationality: Vietnamese
- Born: 27 July 1960 (age 65) Đồng Quang commune, Quốc Oai district, Hanoi

Sport
- Sport: Wrestling

Phí Hữu Tình (born 27 July 1960) is a Vietnamese former wrestler. He competed in the men's freestyle 62 kg at the 1980 Summer Olympics.

== Early life ==
Phí Hữu Tình was born on 27 July 1960, at Yên Nội village, Đồng Quang commune, Quốc Oai district, Hanoi.

== Career ==
He began his wrestling career in village wrestling rings.

At age 20, he qualified for 1980 Summer Olympics and became the first Vietnamese wrestler to win an Olympic match, having defeated Cameroonian wrestler Victor Kede Manga.

== Awards ==
He was awarded third-class Labour Order in 1993.
