= László Óváry =

Hungarian wrestler

Personal information
- Nationality: Hungarian
- Born: 1 February 1970 (age 56) Budapest, Hungary

Sport
- Sport: Wrestling

László Óváry (born 1 February 1970) is a Hungarian wrestler. He competed in the men's freestyle 48 kg at the 1992 Summer Olympics.
