= Ölziibayaryn Nasanjargal =

Mongolian wrestler

Personal information
- Nationality: Mongolian
- Born: 5 September 1955 (age 70)

Sport
- Sport: Wrestling

Ölziibayaryn Nasanjargal (born 5 September 1955) is a Mongolian wrestler. He competed in the men's freestyle 62 kg at the 1980 Summer Olympics.
