= Mohammad Khadem =

Iranian freestyle wrestler (1935–2020)

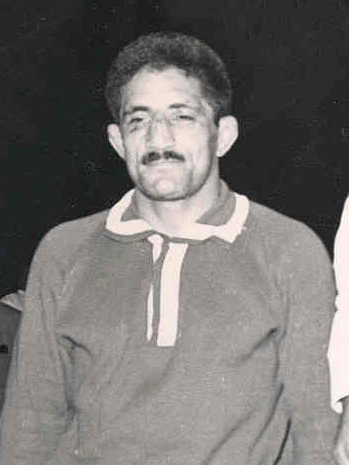

Personal information
- Born: 7 September 1935 Mashhad, Iran
- Died: 24 November 2020 (aged 85) Tehran, Iran
- Height: 165 cm (5 ft 5 in)

Sport
- Sport: Freestyle wrestling
Medal record
Representing Iran
World Championships
Silver medal – second place	1962 Toledo	63 kg

Mohamed Khadem Khorasani Azghadi (Persian: محمد خادم خراسانی ازغدى, 7 September 1935 – 24 November 2020) was an Iranian featherweight freestyle wrestler. He won a silver medal at the 1962 World Championships and placed eighth at the 1960 Summer Olympics. His sons Amir Reza Khadem and Rasoul Khadem and ebrahim khadem were also doctor and Olympic freestyle wrestlers.
