= Gigel Anghel =

Romanian wrestler

Personal information
- Nationality: Romanian
- Born: 25 February 1955 (age 71) Bucharest, Romania

Sport
- Sport: Wrestling
Medal record
Representing Romania
Summer Universiade
Bronze medal – third place	1977 Sofia	-62 kg

Gigel Anghel (born 25 February 1955) is a Romanian wrestler. He competed in the men's freestyle 57 kg at the 1976 Summer Olympics.
