= Marian Avramov =

Bulgarian wrestler

Personal information
- Native name: Мариян Недков Аврамов
- Full name: Marian Nedkov Avramov
- Nationality: Bulgarian
- Born: 13 April 1965 (age 61) Kazanlak, Stara Zagora, Bulgaria

Sport
- Sport: Wrestling

Achievements and titles
- World finals: Silver

Marian Nedkov Avramov (Bulgarian: Мариан Недков Аврамов; born 13 April 1965) is a Bulgarian wrestler. He competed in the men's freestyle 48 kg at the 1992 Summer Olympics.
