= Adnan Kudmani =

Syrian wrestler

Personal information
- Nationality: Syrian
- Born: 18 January 1957 (age 69)

Sport
- Sport: Wrestling

Adnan Kudmani (born 18 January 1957) is a Syrian wrestler. He competed in the men's freestyle 62 kg at the 1980 Summer Olympics, losing both his matches.
