= Zoltán Szalontai =

Hungarian wrestler

Personal information
- Nationality: Hungarian
- Born: 14 August 1956 Diósgyőr, Hungary
- Died: 24 November 2005 (aged 49) Miskolc, Hungary

Sport
- Sport: Wrestling

Zoltán Szalontai (14 August 1956 – 24 November 2005) was a Hungarian wrestler. He competed in the men's freestyle 62 kg at the 1980 Summer Olympics.
