= Romica Rașovan =

Romanian wrestler

Personal information
- Nationality: Romanian
- Born: 22 December 1967 (age 58) Reșița, Romania

Sport
- Sport: Wrestling

Romica Rașovan (born 22 December 1967) is a Romanian wrestler. He competed in the men's freestyle 48 kg at the 1992 Summer Olympics.
