= Francisco Sánchez (wrestler, born 1970) =

Spanish freestyle wrestler (born 1970)

Personal information
- Full name: Francisco José Sánchez Moreno
- Born: 5 December 1970 (age 55) Bilbao, Spain

Sport
- Country: Spain
- Sport: Freestyle wrestling
- Weight class: 48 kg (106 lb)

Francisco José Sánchez Moreno (Note: In this Spanish name, the first or paternal surname is Sánchez and the second or maternal family name is Moreno.) (born 5 December 1970 in Bilbao) is a Spanish wrestler. He competed in the men's freestyle 48 kg at the 1992 Summer Olympics.
