= Jeong Yun-ok =

South Korean wrestler

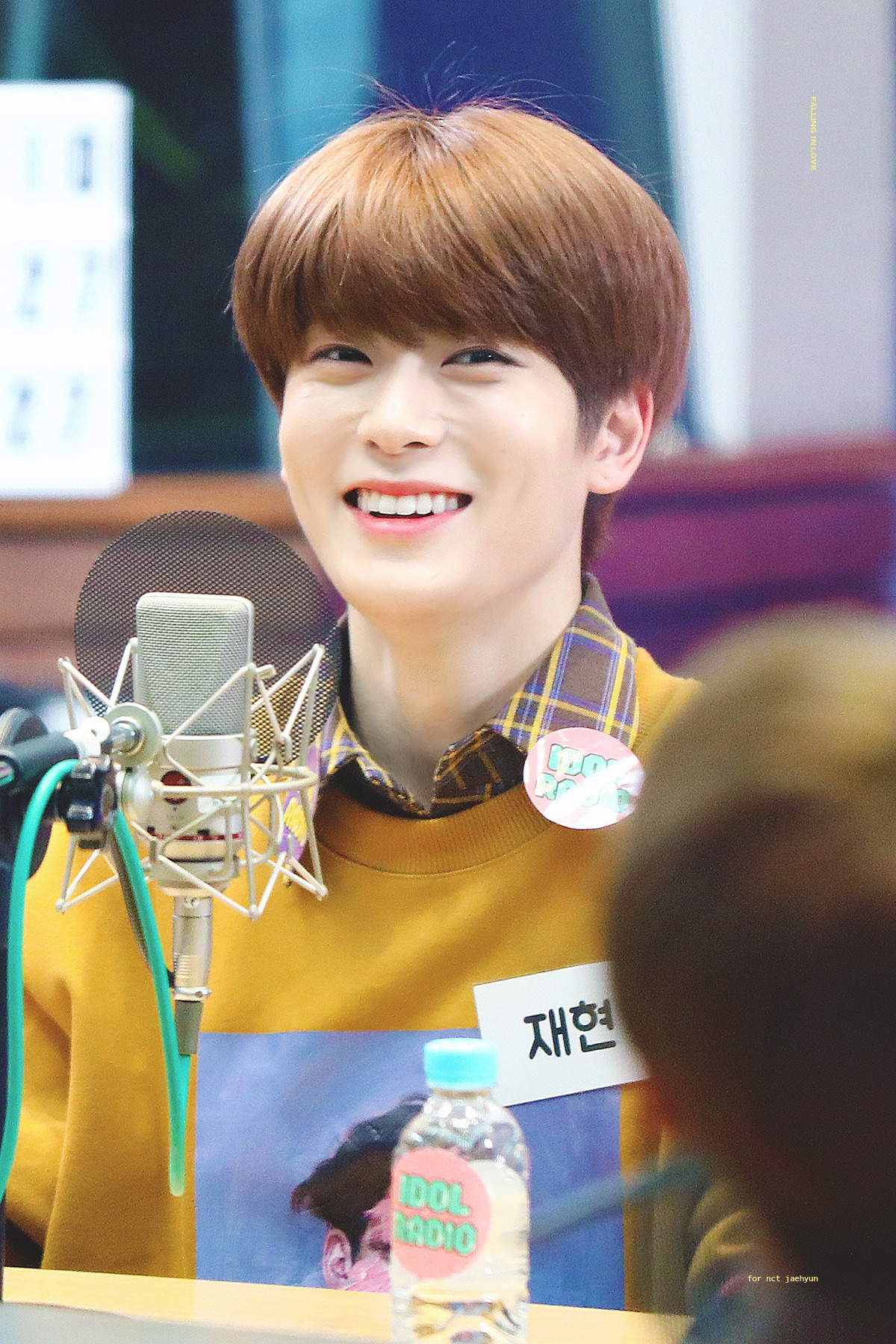
- Jeong Yun-ok

Personal information
- Nationality: South Korean
- Born: 4 July 1949 (age 77)

Sport
- Sport: Wrestling

Jeong Yun-ok (born 4 July 1949) is a South Korean wrestler. He competed in the men's freestyle 57 kg at the 1976 Summer Olympics.
