= Chaouki Sammari =

Tunisian wrestler

Personal information
- Nationality: Tunisian
- Born: 20 March 1972 (age 54)

Sport
- Sport: Wrestling

Chaouki Sammari (born 20 March 1972) is a Tunisian wrestler. He competed in the men's freestyle 48 kg at the 1992 Summer Olympics.
