= Valery Arutyunov =

Soviet Armenian wrestler

Valeri Harutyunyan
Personal information
- Full name: Valeri Harutyunyan
- Born: 20 May 1949
- Died: 13 August 2023 (aged 74)
- Weight: 52 kg (115 lb)

Sport
- Sport: Wrestling
- Event: Greco-Roman
Medal record
Men's Greco-Roman wrestling
Representing the Soviet Union
World Championships
Silver medal – second place	1974 Katowice	52 kg
European Championships
Bronze medal – third place	1973 Helsinki	52 kg
Silver medal – second place	1974 Madrid	52 kg
Silver medal – second place	1975 Ludwigshafen	52 kg

Valeri Harutyunyan (Armenian: Վալերի Հարությունյան) is a former Soviet Armenian Greco-Roman wrestler. He won a silver medal at the 1974 World Wrestling Championships and two silver and one bronze medal at the European Wrestling Championships at 52 kg.
