= Hsu Chin-hsiung =

Taiwanese wrestler

Personal information
- Full name: 許金雄, Pinyin: Xǔ Jīn-xióng
- Nationality: Taiwanese
- Born: 10 September 1952 (age 73)

Sport
- Sport: Wrestling

Hsu Chin-hsiung (born 10 September 1952) is a Taiwanese wrestler. He competed in the men's freestyle 57 kg at the 1972 Summer Olympics.
