= Stanisław Szostecki =

Polish wrestler (1968–2021)

Personal information
- Nationality: Polish
- Born: 15 January 1968 Sokołów Małopolski, Poland
- Died: 3 November 2021 (aged 53) Freiburg im Breisgau

Sport
- Sport: Wrestling

Stanisław Szostecki (15 January 1968 – 3 November 2021) was a Polish wrestler. He competed in the men's freestyle 48 kg at the 1992 Summer Olympics.
