= Tserenbaataryn Khosbayar =

Mongolian wrestler (born 1965)

Personal information
- Nationality: Mongolian
- Born: 4 August 1965 (age 60)

Sport
- Country: Mongolia
- Sport: Freestyle Wrestling
- Weight class: 48 kg
Medal record
Men's freestyle wrestling
Representing Mongolia
Asian Games
Bronze medal – third place	1990 Beijing	48 kg
Asian Championships
Silver medal – second place	1992 Ulaanbaatar	48 kg
Silver medal – second place	1993 Tehran	48 kg
Golden Grand Prix Ivan Yarygin
Silver medal – second place	1992 Krasnoyarsk	48 kg

Tserenbaataryn Khosbayar (born 4 August 1965) is a Mongolian wrestler. He competed in the men's freestyle 48 kg at the 1992 Summer Olympics.
