= Pappu Yadav (wrestler) =

Indian wrestler (born 1974)

Personal information
- Nationality: Indian
- Born: 25 February 1974 (age 52)

Sport
- Sport: Wrestling
Medal record
Greco-Roman wrestling
Representing India
Asian Championships
Gold medal – first place	1993 Hiroshima	48 kg
Silver medal – second place	1992 Tehran	48 kg

Pappu Yadav (born 25 February 1974) is an Indian wrestler. He competed at the 1992 Summer Olympics and the 1996 Summer Olympics. He also won a gold medal at the 1993 Asian Wrestling Championships.
