= Song Sung-il =

South Korean Greco-Roman wrestler

Personal information
- Born: 8 August 1969 Gwacheon, South Korea
- Died: 29 January 1995 (aged 25) Seoul, South Korea
- Height: 1.97 m (6 ft 5 1/2 in)
- Weight: 100 kg (220 lb)

Sport
- Country: South Korea
- Sport: Wrestling
Medal record
Song Sung-il
Medal record
Representing South Korea
Men's Greco-Roman wrestling
Asian Games
Gold medal – first place	1994 Hiroshima	100 kg
Asian Championships
Gold medal – first place	1992 Tehran	100 kg
Gold medal – first place	1993 Hiroshima	100 kg

Song Sung Il (8 August 1969 – 29 January 1995) was a South Korean Greco-Roman wrestler. He was born in Gwacheon, South Korea.

Born in Gwacheon, South Korea, he won a gold medal at 1994 Asian Games in Hiroshima. He also competed in 1992 Summer Olympics at Barcelona.

== Death ==
He died of stomach cancer in Seoul on 29 January 1995, aged 25.
