= Raúl Cascaret =

Cuban wrestler (1962–1995)

Personal information
- Full name: Raúl Cascaret Fonseca
- Born: 20 June 1962 Santiago de Cuba, Cuba
- Died: 26 March 1995 (aged 32) Havana, Cuba

Sport
- Sport: Wrestling
Medal record
Men's freestyle wrestling
Representing Cuba
World Championships
Gold medal – first place	1985 Budapest	74 kg
Gold medal – first place	1986 Budapest	74 kg
Silver medal – second place	1982 Edmonton	68 kg
Pan American Games
Gold medal – first place	1983 Caracas	68 kg
Silver medal – second place	1979 San Juan	62 kg
Silver medal – second place	1987 Indianapolis	74 kg
World Cup
Silver medal – second place	1986 Toledo	74 kg
Bronze medal – third place	1984 Toledo	74 kg
Bronze medal – third place	1989 Toledo	82 kg
Pan American Championships
Silver medal – second place	1989 Colorado Springs	82 kg
Universiade
Gold medal – first place	1981 Bucharest	68 kg
Central American and Caribbean Games
Gold medal – first place	1986 Santiago	74 kg
Cuban National Championships
Gold medal – first place	1978 Camagüey	62 kg
Gold medal – first place	1979 Santiago de Cuba	62 kg
Gold medal – first place	1980 Santiago de Cuba	62 kg
Gold medal – first place	1981 Santiago de Cuba	68 kg
Gold medal – first place	1982 Santiago de Cuba	68 kg
Gold medal – first place	1985 Matanzas	74 kg
Gold medal – first place	1986 Santiago de Cuba	74 kg
Silver medal – second place	1988 Camagüey	82 kg
Silver medal – second place	1989 Santi Spiritus	82 kg

Raúl Cascaret Fonseca (20 June 1962 – 26 March 1995) was a Cuban freestyle wrestler. Cascaret was a two-time World Champion and competed in the men's freestyle 62 kg at the 1980 Summer Olympics, placing fourth. A Pan American Games champion and a seven-time Cuban National champion, Cascaret died in a car crash in 1995, at the age of 32.
