= Tom Petryshen =

Canadian freestyle wrestler

Personal information
- Full name: Thomas Anthony Petryshen
- Born: January 3, 1969 (age 57) Vancouver, British Columbia, Canada
- Height: 5 ft 5 in (165 cm)

Sport
- Country: Canada
- Sport: Freestyle wrestling
- Weight class: 48 kg (106 lb)
- University team: Simon Fraser University

Achievements and titles
- Olympic finals: 1992 Summer Olympics
Medal record
Pan American Championships
Bronze medal – third place	1992 Albany	48 kg

Thomas Anthony Petryshen (born January 3, 1969, in Vancouver, British Columbia) is a former Olympic wrestler from Canada. At the 1992 Summer Olympics in Barcelona, he finished ninth in the men's freestyle 48 kg event. He began his grappling career as a thirteen-year-old in Surrey, British Columbia, and went on to wrestle for Simon Fraser University and represent Canada at the international level.
