= Joe Corso =

American wrestler (born 1951)

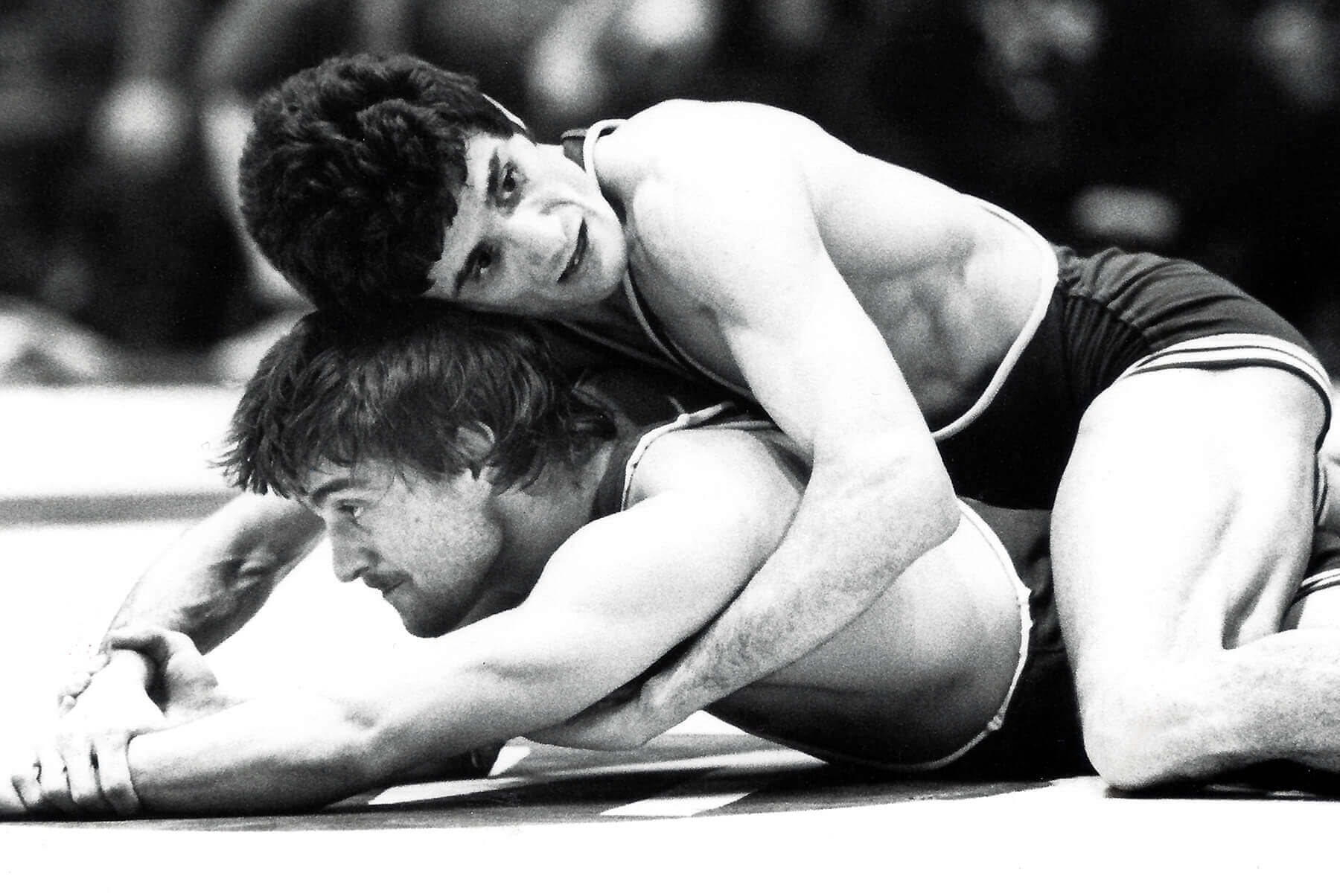
- Corso (top) during freestyle wrestling match

Personal information
- Full name: Joseph Marion Corso
- Nationality: American
- Born: December 22, 1951 (age 74) Turin, Italy
- Home town: West Des Moines, Iowa, U.S.
- Height: 5 ft 7 in (170 cm)
- Weight: 126 lb (57 kg)

Sport
- Country: United States
- Sport: Wrestling
- Events: Freestyle and Folkstyle
- College team: Purdue
- Club: Sunkist Kids Wrestling Club
- Team: USA
Medal record
Men's freestyle wrestling
Representing United States
World Championships
| Bronze medal – third place | 1979 San Diego | 57 kg |
Pan American Games
| Gold medal – first place | 1979 San Juan | 57 kg |
Collegiate Wrestling
Representing the Purdue Boilermakers
NCAA Division I Championships
| Bronze medal – third place | 1975 Princeton | 126 lb |

Joseph Marion "Joe" Corso (born December 22, 1951) is an American wrestler and coach. He competed in the men's freestyle 57 kg at the 1976 Summer Olympics, and was USA Women's Wrestling's first coach.

== Early life ==
Born in Turin, Italy, December 22, 1951, Joe was raised by the Nuns of Turin Catholic Charities before being adopted at the age of 5 by Joe and Hazel Corso, owners of an Italian restaurant in West Des Moines, Iowa. At the time of his arrival in the United States he spoke only Italian.

== Wrestling career ==
Being of small physical stature, his athletic opportunities were limited, however under the tutelage of Coach Larry Bock he placed 2nd in the Iowa High School State Wrestling Tournament in 1970 and became the #112 State Champion for Valley West Des Moines’ in 1971, its first State Champion since 1936.

What followed was a steady climb which saw Joe excel at the Collegiate, National and International level. During his active years, Joe won 6 National Freestyle Wrestling Championships and numerous international titles while also pursuing a career in coaching. He also was a member of the 1976 Freestyle Olympic Wrestling Team.

Representing the United States
| Year | Competition | Venue | Position | Notes |
|---|---|---|---|---|
| 1976 | Wrestling Bantamweight, Freestyle | Montreal, Canada | 8, 0 | 57 kg |
| 1980 | | Moscow, Russia | | Boycotted, 57 kg |
| 1984 | | Los Angeles, CA. USA | | 2nd Alternate, 57 kg |

== Olympic accomplishments ==
Joe Corso represented the United States in men's freestyle wrestling at the 1976 Summer Olympic Games in Montreal, Canada, competing in the 57 kg weight category.

In the lead-up to the 1980 Olympic Games in Moscow, Joe was designated as the 57 kg reserve for the United States wrestling team. Unfortunately, an injury prevented him from participating in the Games, which were subsequently boycotted by the United States.

Joe's wrestling journey continued as he held the position of 2nd alternate at 57 kg for the 1984 Olympic team representing the United States in Los Angeles.

== Coaching career ==
He played a role in fostering the growth of women's wrestling.

=== Past Coaching Positions ===
- 1978–1980 - Assistant wrestling coach at the University of Minnesota
- 1981–1984 - Assistant wrestling coach at Indiana University
- 1984–2005 - Freestyle coach at Sunkist Kids Wrestling Club
- 1991–1993 - Wrestling coach at Brophy College Preparatory High School
- 2005–2012 - Coach at Gator Women's Wrestling Club
- 2005–2007 - Head coach at Brother Martin High School in New Orleans, Louisiana

- 2005 - 3rd place in State
- 2006 - 2nd place in State
- 2007 - 1st place in State

- 2012–present - Women's & Men's Freestyle coach at Sunkist Kids Wrestling Club
- Wrestled/Coached as either head or assistant of seven senior women's world teams

== Iowa Wrestling Hall of Fame ==
In 2019, Joseph Marion "Joe" Corso was honored for his contributions to the sport of wrestling with his induction into the Iowa Wrestling Hall of Fame.

== Honors and awards ==
- 1971 - Iowa High School State Champion (AAA) at 112 lbs
- 1975 - NCAA Bronze Medalist at 126 lbs
- 1975 - Big Ten Champion at 126 lbs
- 1975 - Big Ten Outstanding Wrestler Award
- 1976 - Member of the USA Olympic Team, Montreal, Canada
- 1979 - Pan American Gold Medal at 125.5 lbs
- 1979 - Bronze Medalist at World Championships, 125.5 lbs
- 1984 - 2nd Alternate, USA Olympic Team
- 1991 - FILA Veteran's World Champion, Cali, Colombia
- 2002 - USA Women's Coach of the Year
- 2004 - National Glen Brand Hall of Fame Inductee
- 2006 - USA Women's Coach of the Year
- 2019 - Inducted into the Iowa Wrestling Hall of Fame
