= Fariborz Besarati =

Swedish wrestler

Fariborz Besarati (born 23 August 1966) is a Swedish former wrestler who competed in the 1992 Summer Olympics and in the 1996 Summer Olympics.
