= Hideaki Yanagida =

Japanese wrestler (born 1947)

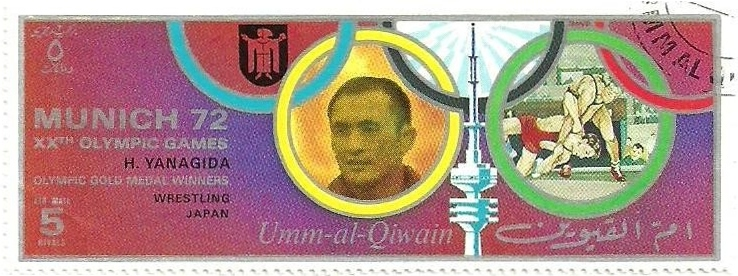
- Yanagida on a stamp of Umm al-Quwain

Personal information
- Born: 1 January 1947 (age 79) Hatirogata, Akita Prefecture, Japan
- Height: 159 cm (5 ft 3 in)
- Weight: 57 kg (126 lb)

Sport
- Sport: Freestyle wrestling
Medal record
Representing Japan
Olympic Games
Gold medal – first place	1972 Munich	57 kg
World Championships
Gold medal – first place	1970 Edmonton	57 kg
Gold medal – first place	1971 Sofia	57 kg
Asian Games
Gold medal – first place	1970 Bangkok	57 kg

Hideaki Yanagida (柳田 英明, Yanagida Hideaki; born 1 January 1947) is a retired Japanese bantamweight freestyle wrestler. He won his event at the 1970 Asian Games, 1970 and 1971 world championships and 1972 Summer Olympics.

== Life and career ==
He felt extremely pressured to perform well at the 1972 Olympics, and thus complained of an early burnout. He retired right after winning gold and became the coach of the national team in 1973 up until the 1976 Summer Olympics. He was then working in his home town for the family business (a liquor shop) and in 1983 was invited to coach the Korean national team up to the 1988 Summer Olympics. Since 1993, he has been coaching wrestlers in his home town. As a coach, he advised Mitsuru Sato who later won gold at the 1988 Olympics, to attend Nippon Sport Science University.
