= Horst Mayer =

German wrestler

Horst Mayer (born 24 September 1945 in Schlenzer) is a German former wrestler who competed in the 1968 Summer Olympics and in the 1972 Summer Olympics.
