= Ivan Kuleshov =

Russian former wrestler (born 1946)

Ivan Kuleshov (born 29 November 1946) is a Russian former wrestler who competed in the 1972 Summer Olympics.
