= Kazım Yıldırım =

Turkish wrestler (born 1948)

Kazım Yıldırım (born 2 June 1948) is a Turkish former wrestler who competed in the 1972 Summer Olympics.
