= Rasoul Khadem =

Iranian freestyle wrestler

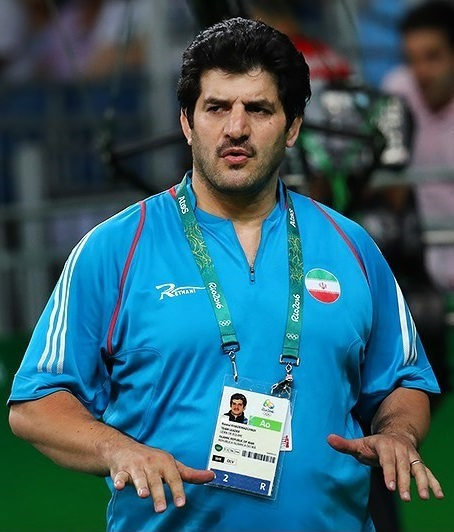
- Rasoul Khadem during 2016 Summer Olympics

Member of City Council of Tehran
- In office 29 April 2003 – 3 September 2013

Personal details
- Born: Rasoul Khadem Azghadi; 18 March 1972 (age 54) Mashhad, Iran
- Party: Independent
- Parent: Mohammad Khadem (father)
- Relatives: Amir Reza Khadem (brother) Ebrahim Khadem (brother)
- Sports career
- Country: Iran
- Sport: Wrestling
Medal record
Representing Iran
Men's freestyle wrestling
Olympic Games
Gold medal – first place	1996 Atlanta	90 kg
Bronze medal – third place	1992 Barcelona	82 kg
World Championships
Gold medal – first place	1994 Istanbul	90 kg
Gold medal – first place	1995 Atlanta	90 kg
Silver medal – second place	1998 Tehran	130 kg
Asian Games
Gold medal – first place	1994 Hiroshima	90 kg
Silver medal – second place	1990 Beijing	68 kg
Asian Championships
Gold medal – first place	1991 New Delhi	82 kg
Gold medal – first place	1992 Tehran	82 kg
Gold medal – first place	1993 Ulan Bator	90 kg
Gold medal – first place	1995 Manila	90 kg
Gold medal – first place	1996 Xiaoshan	90 kg

Rasoul Khadem Azghadi (Persian: رسول خادم ازغدی; born March 18, 1972) is an Iranian former wrestler who has won a bronze medal in the 1992 Summer Olympics and a gold medal in the 1996 Summer Olympics. He was also the 1994 and 1995 world champion and 1991, 1992, 1993, 1994, 1995 and 1996 Asian champion. He was trained by his father Mohammad Khadem, and he is also the younger brother of Olympic wrestling bronze medalists Amir Reza Khadem and Ebrahim Khadem.

He was the president of Islamic Republic of Iran Wrestling Federation from January 4, 2014, to November 3, 2018. He was also the technical director of Iran's wrestling national teams and the head coach of Iran's freestyle national team from January 2012 to 2018. In addition, he was elected as an executive board member of National Olympic Committee of Iran on January 20, 2014, and served until January 2018.

== Personal life ==
On 4 January 2026, Khadem publicly supported the 2025–2026 Iranian protests by posting a scene from The Death of Yazdgerd, a movie banned by the Islamic Republic, in which the main character, a baker named Mobed, tells his wife he's going to send a message to the people of Iran; his wife, played by Susan Taslimi, responds with "Send a message, Mobed, but add a little bread to it; we people are full of messages and hungry for bread." On 25 January, concerning the high casualty rate of the protests, wrote on his Instagram: "The homeland is grieving. We are grieving."

== Major achievements ==
- Junior World Championship – (gold) 1991 (bronze) 1989
- World Championships – (gold) 1994 1995 (silver) 1998
- Olympic Games - (gold) 1996 (bronze) 1992
