= Ghulam Sideer =

Afghan wrestler (born 1943)

Ghulam Sideer (born 1943) is a former Afghanistan wrestler, who competed at the 1972 Summer Olympic Games in the bantamweight division.
