= Magomedgasan Abushev =

Soviet wrestler

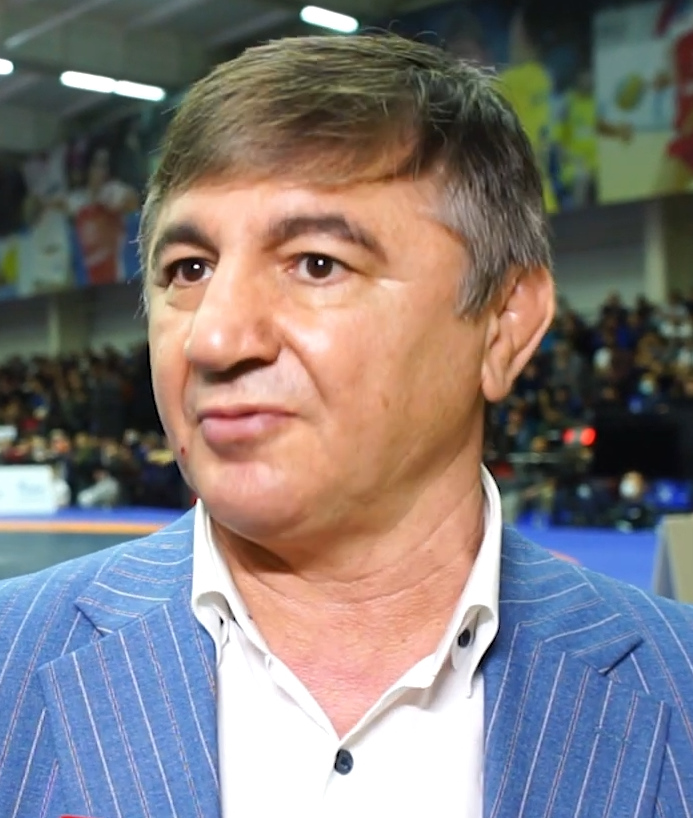
- Abushev in 2020

Personal information
- Born: 10 November 1959 (age 66) Karabudakhkent, Dagestan ASSR, Russian SFSR, Soviet Union
- Height: 170 cm (5 ft 7 in)

Sport
- Sport: Freestyle wrestling
- Club: Dynamo Makhachkala
Medal record
Representing the Soviet Union
Olympic Games
Gold medal – first place	1980 Moscow	62 kg
European championships
Gold medal – first place	1980 Prievidza	62 kg

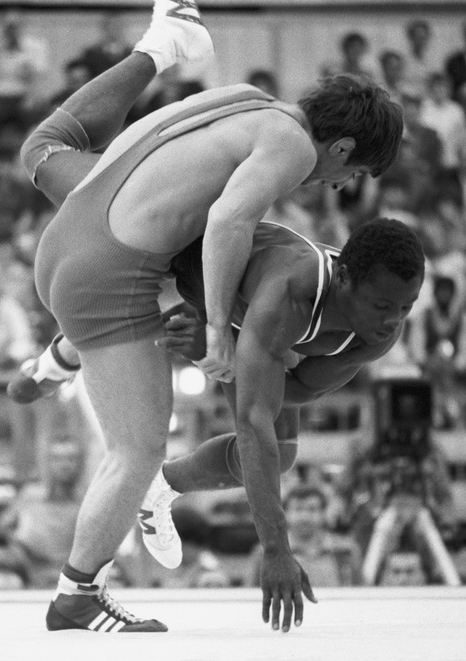
Abushev (left) at the 1980 Olympics versus Augustine Atasie of Nigeria

Magomedgasan Mingazhutdinovich Abushev (Kumyk: Muhammadhasan Abuş; born 10 November 1959) is a Kumyk retired featherweight freestyle wrestler from Dagestan. Competing for the Soviet Union he won gold medals at the 1980 Olympics and 1980 European Championships.

Abushev took up wrestling in 1971, and won world junior titles in 1977 (flyweight) and 1979 (featherweight). He won his only Soviet title in 1984 as a lightweight. Earlier in 1981 he graduated in economics from the Dagestan State University and after retiring from wrestling became a businessman in Dagestan. From 1994 to 1998 he worked at the Derbent Oil Depot, and in 1998–2003 was the deputy head of the cognac-producing company Dagvino. In 2003 he became an auditor of the Accounts Chamber of Dagestan.
