= Aurel Șuteu =

Romanian wrestler

Personal information
- Nationality: Romanian
- Born: 8 December 1957 (age 68)

Sport
- Sport: Wrestling

Aurel Șuteu (born 8 December 1957) is a Romanian wrestler. He competed in the men's freestyle 62 kg at the 1980 Summer Olympics. Aurel Șuteu is known for winning a match against Brian Aspen by decision in the 3rd round of the 1980 Summer Olympics.
