= Arturo Tanaquin =

Filipino wrestler

Arturo Tanaquin (born 20 January 1941) is a Filipino former wrestler who competed in the 1972 Summer Olympics.
