= Augustine Atasie =

Nigerian sport wrestler

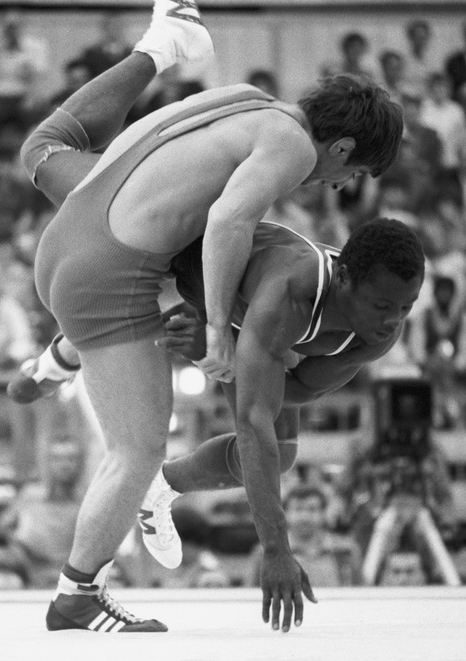
- Atasie (right) at the 1980 Olympics versus Magomedgasan Abushev of the Soviet Union

Personal information
- Born: 18 August 1957 (age 68)
- Height: 165 cm (5 ft 5 in)
- Weight: 62 kg (137 lb)

Sport
- Sport: Freestyle wrestling
Medal record
Representing Nigeria
Commonwealth Games
Bronze medal – third place	1982 Brisbane	-62 kg

Augustine Atasie (born 18 August 1957) is featherweight freestyle wrestler from Imo State, Nigeria who won a bronze medal at the 1982 Commonwealth Games. He competed at the 1980 Summer Olympics but was eliminated after two bouts.
