= Eduardo Maggiolo =

Argentine wrestler (born 1944)

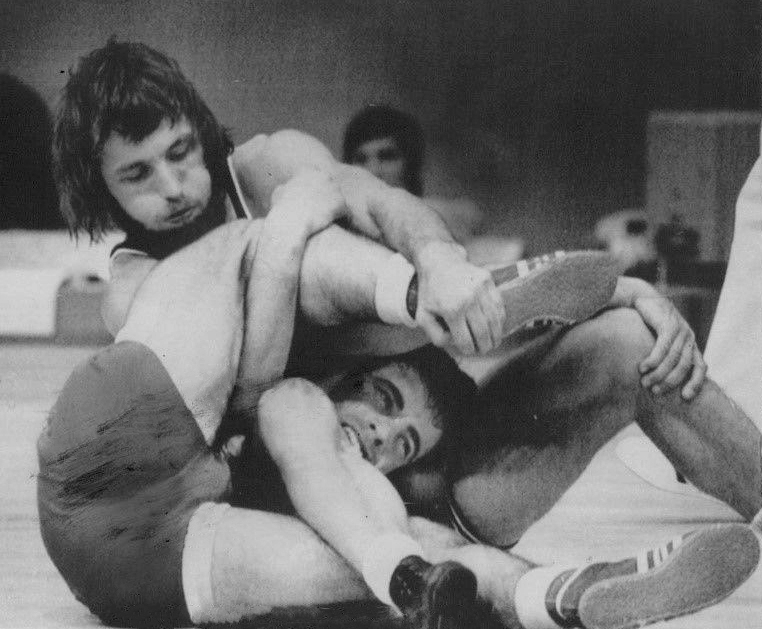
- Maggiolo (bottom) at the 1972 Olympics

Personal information
- Born: 2 August 1944 (age 81)
- Height: 165 cm (5 ft 5 in)
- Weight: 57 kg (126 lb)

Sport
- Sport: Freestyle wrestling
Medal record
Representing Argentina
Pan American Games
Bronze medal – third place	1971 Cali	-57 kg

Eduardo Maggiolo (born 2 August 1944) is a retired Argentine wrestler who won a bronze medal in the 57 kg freestyle category at the 1971 Pan American Games. He competed in freestyle and Greco-Roman wrestling at the 1972 Summer Olympics, but was eliminated in the fourth and second bout, respectively.
