= Kim Il (wrestler) =

North Korean wrestler (born 1971)

Personal information
- Born: 25 July 1971 (age 54) North Korea
- Height: 1.58 m (5 ft 2 in)
- Weight: 54 kg (119 lb)

Sport
- Sport: Wrestling
- Event: Freestyle
Medal record
Men's freestyle wrestling
Representing North Korea
Olympic Games
Gold medal – first place	1992 Barcelona	48 kg
Gold medal – first place	1996 Atlanta	48 kg
World Championships
Silver medal – second place	1991 Varna	48 kg
Asian Championships
Gold medal – first place	1992 Tehran	48 kg
Gold medal – first place	1993 Ulan Bator	48 kg
Gold medal – first place	1996 Xiaoshan	48 kg

- Kim Il
- Hangul: 김일
- Hanja: 金日
- RR: Gim Il
- MR: Kim Il

Kim Il (born 25 July 1971) is a North Korean freestyle wrestler. He won two Olympic gold medals at the 1992 and 1996 Summer Olympics in the light flyweight (–48 kg) category. He won silver at the 1991 World Championships. In 2006, he was inducted into the Federation Internationale de Luttes Associees Hall of Fame.
