= Luis Fuentes (wrestler) =

Guatemalan wrestler (born 1946)

Luis Fuentes (born 27 September 1946) is a Guatemalan former wrestler who competed in the 1972 Summer Olympics.
