= Gordon Smith (wrestler) =

Australian wrestler

Personal information
- Nationality: Australian
- Born: 21 June 1954 (age 71)
- Height: 163 cm (5 ft 4 in)
- Weight: 57 kg (126 lb)

Sport
- Sport: wrestling

Gordon Smith (born 21 June 1954) is an Australian former wrestler who competed at the 1976 Summer Olympics.

== Junior career ==
Smith was a member of the Bankstown Police Citizens Boys Club and the Bankstown Junior Sports Club. In 1971, He was an Australian Junior Representative at the World Championship in Japan.

== Senior career ==
He competed in the 1976 Summer Olympics in Montreal, Canada, where he was eliminated after two matches. Smith represented Australia in three World Championships, one in 1971 and two in 1979, in the Intermediate and Senior Grades. He held the title of Australian Champion from 1968 to 1979

== Post wrestling career ==
He later worked as a Personal Development, Health and Physical Education (PDHPE) teacher, in the position of Head Teacher PDHPE at Baulkham Hills High School in Sydney, Australia until 2014 when he retired.
