= Kim Jong-shin =

South Korean wrestler (born 1970)

Medal record

Representing South Korea

Men's freestyle wrestling

Olympic Games
Silver medal – second place	1992 Barcelona	48 kg

World Championships
Gold medal – first place	1989 Martigny	48 kg
Bronze medal – third place	1991 Varna	48 kg

Asian Games
Gold medal – first place	1990 Beijing	48 kg

Kim Jong-Shin (Korean: 김종신; Hanja: 金鍾信; born May 17, 1970) is a retired South Korean freestyle wrestler.

Kim first garnered attention in the 1988 World Junior Wrestling Championships, held in Wolfurt, Austria, where he won the gold medal in the freestyle 50 kg class. Next year, he captured the gold medal at the 1989 World Wrestling Championships, held in Martigny, Switzerland, defeating future Olympic champion Li Hak-Son of North Korea 4–2 in the final match.

Kim currently runs his own sambo gym in Seoul.
