= Nicolae Dumitru =

Romanian wrestler

Nicolae Dumitru (born 21 September 1949) is a Romanian former wrestler who competed in the 1972 Summer Olympics.
