= Vugar Orujov =

Olympic wrestler

Vugar Orujov Вугар Оруджев
Personal information
- Full name: Vugar Nariman oglu Orujov
- Nationality: Russian; Belarusian
- Born: 26 October 1971 Baku, Soviet Union
- Height: 1.55 m (5 ft 1 in)
- Weight: 48 kg (106 lb)

Sport
- Country: Soviet Union; Russia; Belarus
- Sport: Wrestling
- Event: Freestyle
- Club: Minsk freestyle wrestling club
- Coached by: Zhora Dzhangirov
Medal record
Men's freestyle wrestling
Representing Unified Team
Olympic Games
Bronze medal – third place	1992 Barcelona	48 kg
European Championships
Silver medal – second place	1992 Kaposvar	48 kg
Representing Soviet Union
World Championships
Gold medal – first place	1991 Varna	48 kg
European Championships
Bronze medal – third place	1991 Stuttgart	48 kg
USSR National Championships
Gold medal – first place	1991 Zaporizhzhia	48 kg
USSR National Cup
Gold medal – first place	1990 Tbilisi	48 kg
Espoir European Championships
Gold medal – first place	1990 Lapua	48 kg
Representing Belarus
World Championships
Silver medal – second place	1993 Toronto	48 kg
Representing Russia
World Championships
Gold medal – first place	1995 Atlanta	48 kg
European Championships
Gold medal – first place	1995 Fribourg	48 kg
Bronze medal – third place	1996 Budapest	48 kg
World Cup
Gold medal – first place	1995 Chattanooga	48 kg

Vugar Nariman oglu Orujov (Azerbaijani: Vüqar Nəriman oğlu Orucov, Russian: Оруджев Вугар Нариман оглы, born 26 October 1971 in Baku, Azerbaijani SSR, Soviet Union) is a Russian two-time freestyle wrestling world champion and an Olympic bronze medalist of Azerbaijani heritage.

He competed in both the 1992 Summer Olympics, where he competed for the Unified Team, and the 1996 Summer Olympics, taking third and fourth respectively. He is currently a head coach at Nassau Community College in East Garden City, New York.

He has three sons. His middle son, Vitali Arujau, represents Cornell University in NCAA Division I and won the 2023 and 2024 at 133 lb as well as gold at the 2023 World Wrestling Championships at 61 kg, joining his father as a world champion.
