= Raymond Barry =

Australian wrestler

Personal information
- Born: 7 October 1949 (age 76)
- Height: 160 cm (5 ft 3 in)
- Weight: 57 kg (126 lb)

Raymond Barry (born 7 October 1949) is an Australian former wrestler who competed in the 1972 Summer Olympics.
