= Hans-Dieter Brüchert =

East German wrestler (born 1952)

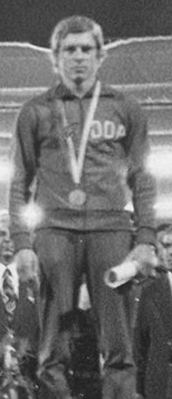
- Brüchert at the 1974 World Championships

Personal information
- Born: 18 August 1952 (age 73) Jarmen, East Germany
- Height: 166 cm (5 ft 5 in)

Sport
- Sport: Freestyle wrestling
- Club: SG Dynamo Luckenwalde
- Coached by: Ernst Sneikus
Medal record
Representing East Germany
Olympic Games
| Silver medal – second place | 1976 Montreal | -57 kg |
World Championships
| Bronze medal – third place | 1974 Istanbul | -57 kg |
European Championships
| Silver medal – second place | 1974 Madrid | -57 kg |
| Bronze medal – third place | 1976 Leningrad | -57 kg |

Hans-Dieter Brüchert (born 18 August 1952) is a retired German freestyle wrestler. Between 1974 and 1976 he won two silver and two bronze medals at major international competitions, including a silver at the 1976 Olympics.

In 1978 Brüchert graduated in physical education from the Deutsche Hochschule für Körperkultur. In 1980 he retired from competitions, and until 1981 coached wrestlers in Potsdam. Between 1981 and 1989 he worked as a sports teacher, and after that as headmaster at a school in Michendorf.
