= Amir Reza Khadem =

Iranian freestyle wrestler

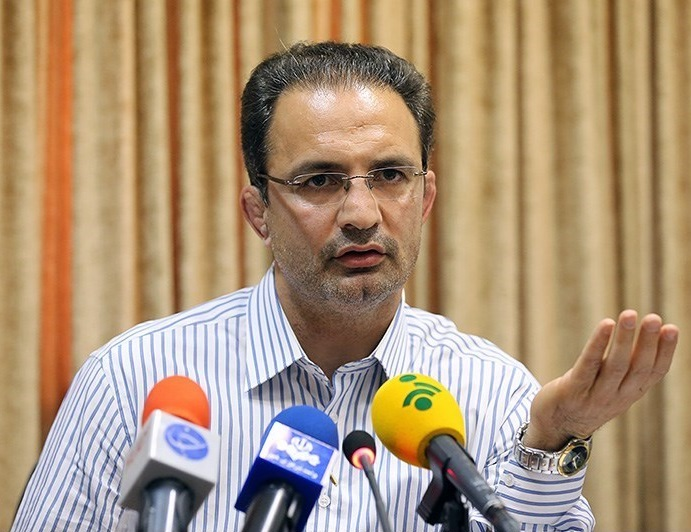

Member of the Parliament of Iran
- In office 28 May 2004 – 28 May 2008
- Constituency: Tehran, Rey, Shemiranat and Eslamshahr
- Majority: 693,603

Personal details
- Born: Amir Reza Khadem Azghadi; 10 February 1970 (age 56) Mashhad, Imperial State of Iran
- Party: Independent
- Other political affiliations: Principlists Pervasive Coalition (2008); Alliance of Builders of Islamic Iran (2004)
- Parent: Mohammad Khadem (father)
- Relatives: Rasoul Khadem (brother) ebrahim khadem (brother)
- Education: Shahid Beheshti University
- Sports career
- Country: Iran
- Sport: Wrestling
Medal record
Representing Iran
Men's freestyle wrestling
Olympic Games
Bronze medal – third place	1992 Barcelona	74 kg
Bronze medal – third place	1996 Atlanta	82 kg
World Championships
Gold medal – first place	1991 Varna	74 kg
Bronze medal – third place	1990 Tokyo	74 kg
Asian Games
Gold medal – first place	1994 Hiroshima	82 kg
Asian Championships
Gold medal – first place	1992 Tehran	74 kg
Gold medal – first place	1993 Ulan Bator	82 kg
Silver medal – second place	1991 New Delhi	74 kg

Amir Reza Khadem Azghadi (Persian: امیررضا خادم ازغدی; born 10 February 1970) is an Iranian wrestler who won Olympic bronze medals in 1992 and 1996. He finished fourth at the 2000 Summer Olympics, and he won the 1991 World Championships, He also won a bronze medal at the 1990 World Championships and the 1992 and 1993 Asian Championships and a silver medal at the 1991 Asian Championships and the 1994 Asian Games.

He was trained by his father Mohammad Khadem. His younger brother Rasoul Khadem is also a world champion and an Olympic gold medalist in freestyle wrestling.

He is currently Vice Minister of Youth Affairs and Sports in Legal, Parliamentary and Provincial Affairs, has been appointed for the position on 30 December 2013.

On 31 January 2026, Khadem took to his Instagram and called on the authorities to release athletes and artists who were imprisoned during the 2025–2026 Iranian protests, as well as all Iranians who were arrested for protesting.

Olympic Games
Preceded by Lida Fariman	Flagbearer for Iran; Sydney 2000	Succeeded by Arash Miresmaeili
