= Georgios Hatziioannidis =

Greek wrestler (born 1951)

Medal record

Men's freestyle wrestling

Representing Greece

Olympic Games
Bronze medal – third place	1980 Moscow	Featherweight

Mediterranean Games
Silver medal – second place	1975 Algiers	Flyweight
Silver medal – second place	1979 Split	Featherweight

Georgics Hatziioannidis (Greek: Γεώργιος Χατζηιωαννίδης; born 22 February 1951 in the Soviet Union) is a Greek wrestler. He was Olympic bronze medalist in Freestyle wrestling in 1980, and also competed at the 1972 and 1976 Olympics.
