= Chen Zhengbin =

Chinese wrestler

Personal information
- Nationality: Chinese
- Born: 14 March 1972 (age 54)

Sport
- Sport: Wrestling

Chen Zhengbin (born 14 March 1972) is a Chinese wrestler. He competed in the men's freestyle 48 kg at the 1992 Summer Olympics.
