= Aldo Martínez =

Cuban wrestler (born 1968)

Aldo Martínez hechavarria
Personal information
- Full name: Aldo Martínez Hechavarria
- Born: August 27, 1968 (age 57) Santiago de Cuba
Medal record
Men's Wrestling
Representing Cuba
World Championships
Gold medal – first place	1990 Tokyo	Freestyle (– 48 kg)
Pan American Games
Gold medal – first place	1987 Indianapolis	Freestyle (– 48 kg)
Gold medal – first place	1991 Havana	Freestyle (– 48 kg)

Aldo Martínez Hechavaria (born August 27, 1968) is retired male wrestler from Cuba. He represented his native country at the 1992 Summer Olympics in Barcelona, Spain, and twice won a gold medal at the Pan American Games during his career.
