= Miho Dukov =

Bulgarian wrestler (born 1955)

Personal information
- Born: 29 October 1955 (age 70) Shivachevo, Sliven Province, Bulgaria
- Height: 165 cm (5 ft 5 in)
- Weight: 57 kg (126 lb; 9 st 0 lb)

Sport
- Club: CSKA Sofia
Medal record
Men's freestyle wrestling
Representing Bulgaria
Olympic Games
Silver medal – second place	1980 Moscow	-62 kg
Summer Universiade
Gold medal – first place	1977 Sofia	-62 kg
European Championships
Gold medal – first place	1978 Sofia	-62 kg
Gold medal – first place	1979 Bucharest	-62 kg
Gold medal – first place	1981 Łódź	-68 kg
Silver medal – second place	1977 Bursa	-62 kg

Miho Ivanov Dukov (Bulgarian: Михо Иванов Дуков; born 29 October 1955) is a Bulgarian former wrestler. He competed in the 1976 Summer Olympics and in the 1980 Summer Olympics.
