= Ramezan Kheder =

Iranian freestyle wrestler

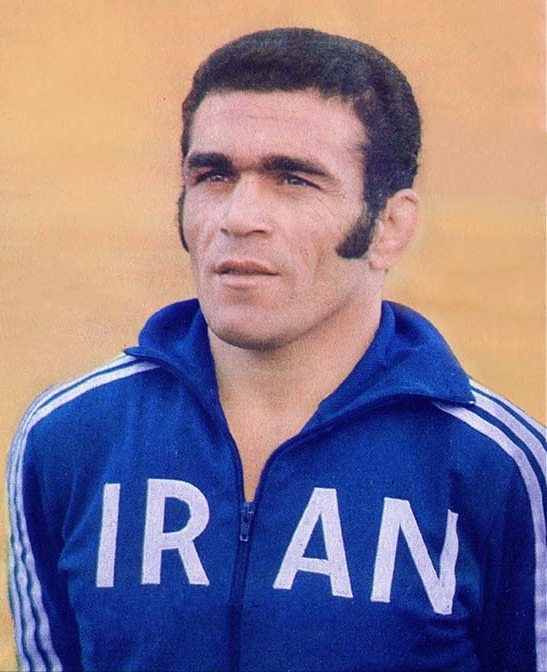
- Ramezan Kheder in 1974

Personal information
- Born: 10 April 1944 Now Kandeh, Iran
- Died: 1999 (aged 54–55)
- Height: 160 cm (5 ft 3 in)

Sport
- Sport: Freestyle wrestling
Medal record
Representing Iran
World championships
Silver medal – second place	1974 Istanbul	-57 kg

Ramezan Kheder (Persian: رمضان خدر, 10 April 1944 – 1999) was an Iranian freestyle wrestler who won a silver medal at the 1974 World Championships. He competed at the 1972 and 1976 Summer Olympics and placed seventh and fifth, respectively.

Kheder died after suffering from a kidney disease for several years. His statue was erected in his native Now Kandeh town.
