= László Klinga =

Hungarian wrestler (born 1947)

Medal record

Men's freestyle wrestling

Representing Hungary

Olympic Games
Bronze medal – third place	1972 Munich	Bantamweight

European Wrestling Championships
Silver medal – second place	1976 Leningrad	Bantamweight
Silver medal – second place	1973 Losanna	Bantamweight

László Klinga (born 9 July 1947) is a Hungarian wrestler. He was born in Győr-Moson-Sopron County. He was Olympic bronze medalist in Freestyle wrestling in 1972.
