= Victor Kede Manga =

Cameroonian wrestler

Personal information
- Nationality: Cameroonian
- Born: 9 August 1952 (age 72)

Sport
- Sport: Wrestling

Victor Kede Manga (born 9 August 1952) is a Cameroonian wrestler. He competed at the 1980 Summer Olympics and the 1984 Summer Olympics.
