= Vladimir Yumin =

Russian freestyle wrestler (1951–2016)

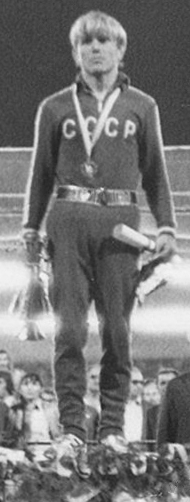
- Yumin at the 1974 World Championships

Personal information
- Born: 18 December 1951 Omsk, Russian SFSR, Soviet Union
- Died: 4 March 2016 (aged 64) Kaspiysk, Russia
- Height: 160 cm (5 ft 3 in)

Sport
- Sport: Freestyle wrestling
- Club: Trud, Makhachkala
Medal record
Representing the Soviet Union
Olympic Games
Gold medal – first place	1976 Montreal	57 kg
World Championships
Gold medal – first place	1974 Istanbul	57 kg
Gold medal – first place	1977 Lausanne	62 kg
Gold medal – first place	1978 Mexico City	62 kg
Gold medal – first place	1979 San Diego	62 kg
Silver medal – second place	1975 Minsk	57 kg
Bronze medal – third place	1973 Tehran	52 kg
European Championships
Gold medal – first place	1975 Ludwigshafen	57 kg
Gold medal – first place	1976 Leningrad	57 kg
Gold medal – first place	1977 Bursa	62 kg

Vladimir Sergeyevich Yumin (Russian: Владимир Сергеевич Юмин; 18 December 1951 – 4 March 2016) was a Russian freestyle wrestler. He won an Olympic gold medal in 1976 and world titles in 1974, 1977, 1978 and 1979, placing second in 1975 and third in 1973. He was also European champion in 1975–77. Domestically, Yumin won Soviet titles in 1973–75 and 1978. He placed third at the 1980 Soviet Championships and did not qualify for the Olympics. After that he retired and worked as a wrestling coach with the Turkish national team. In 2009 he was inducted into the International Wrestling Hall of Fame.

Yumin was born in Omsk in Siberia, but soon moved to the south to Kaspiysk, Dagestan. He spent most of his life there, and died of a heart attack aged 64.
