= Masao Arai =

Japanese wrestler (1949–2024)

Medal record

Men's freestyle wrestling

Representing Japan

Olympic Games
Bronze medal – third place	1976 Montreal	57 kg

World Championships
Gold medal – first place	1975 Minsk	57 kg

Masao Arai (荒井 政雄, Arai Masao; 6 June 1949 – 9 November 2024) was a Japanese wrestler who competed in the 1976 Summer Olympics. Arai died on 9 November 2024, at the age of 75.
