= Risto Darlev =

Yugoslav wrestler (born 1954)

Personal information
- Nationality: Yugoslav
- Born: 4 August 1954 (age 70)

Sport
- Sport: Wrestling

Risto Darlev (born 4 August 1954) is a Yugoslav former wrestler. He competed at the 1972 Summer Olympics and the 1976 Summer Olympics.
