= Jorge Ramos (wrestler) =

Cuban wrestler (born 1949)

Jorge Ramos (born 2 February 1949) is a Cuban former wrestler who competed in the 1972 Summer Olympics and in the 1976 Summer Olympics. At the 1975 Pan American Games he won the gold medal in the men's Freestyle -57 kg.
