= List of Iran national Greco-Roman wrestling medalists =

Iran national amateur Greco-Roman wrestling athletes represents Iran in regional, continental, and world tournaments and matches sanctioned by the United World Wrestling (UWW).

== Olympics ==
Year	Venue	Medalists		
Year	Venue	Gold	Silver	Bronze
1896–1956		Did not participate		
1960	Rome	—	—	Mohammad Paziraei
1964	Tokyo	—	—	—
1968	Mexico City	—	—	—
1972	Munich	—	Rahim Aliabadi	—
1976	Montreal	—	—	—
1980–1984		Did not participate		
1988	Seoul	—	—	—
1992	Barcelona	—	—	—
1996	Atlanta	—	—	—
2000	Sydney	—	—	—
2004	Athens	—	—	—
2008	Beijing	—	—	—
2012	London	Hamid Sourian; Omid Norouzi; Ghasem Rezaei	—	—
2016	Rio de Janeiro	—	—	Saeid Abdevali; Ghasem Rezaei
2020	Tokyo	Mohammad Reza Geraei	—	Mohammad Hadi Saravi
2024	Paris	Saeid Esmaeili; Mohammad Hadi Saravi	Alireza Mohmadi	Amin Mirzazadeh

== World Championships ==
Year	Venue	Medalists			Team rank
Year	Venue	Gold	Silver	Bronze	Team rank
1921–1922		Did not participate			
1950	Stockholm	—	—	—	NR
1953		Did not participate			
1955	Karlsruhe	—	—	—	NR
1958	Budapest	—	—	—	NR
1961	Yokohama	—	—	Alireza Ghelichkhani	7th
1962	Toledo	—	—	—	14th
1963		Did not participate			
1965	Tampere	—	—	—	15th
1966	Toledo	—	—	Iraj Khorshidfar	12th
1967	Bucharest	—	—	—	9th
1969	Mar del Plata	Firouz Alizadeh	Rahim Aliabadi	—	7th
1970	Edmonton	—	—	—	16th
1971	Sofia	—	—	—	NR
1973	Tehran	—	—	Rahim Aliabadi	10th
1974	Katowice	—	—	—	14th
1975	Minsk	—	—	—	NR
1977	Gothenburg	—	—	Morad Ali Shirani	9th
1978	Mexico City	—	—	—	NR
1979		Did not participate			
1981	Oslo	—	—	—	18th
1982		Did not participate			
1983	Kyiv	—	Mohammad Bana	—	13th
1985	Kolbotn	—	—	—	NR
1986–1989		Did not participate			
1990	Rome	—	—	—	22nd
1991	Varna	—	Reza Simkhah	—	17th
1993	Stockholm	—	—	—	NR
1994		Did not participate			
1995	Prague	—	—	—	25th
1997		Did not participate			
1998	Gävle	—	—	—	20th
1999	Athens	—	—	—	26th
2001	Patras	Hassan Rangraz	—	—	5th
2002	Moscow	—	—	Hassan Rangraz	14th
2003	Créteil	—	—	—	28th
2005	Budapest	Hamid Sourian	Ali Ashkani	—	10th
2006	Guangzhou	Hamid Sourian	—	Saman Tahmasebi	5th
2007	Baku	Hamid Sourian	—	Saman Tahmasebi; Ghasem Rezaei	4th
2009	Herning	Hamid Sourian	—	Farshad Alizadeh; Habibollah Akhlaghi; Amir Aliakbari	2nd
2010	Moscow	Hamid Sourian; Amir Aliakbari	—	—	8th
2011	Istanbul	Omid Norouzi; Saeid Abdevali	—	Bashir Babajanzadeh	3rd
2013	Budapest	Taleb Nematpour	—	—	8th
2014	Tashkent	Hamid Sourian	Omid Norouzi	Afshin Biabangard; Ghasem Rezaei	1st
2015	Las Vegas	—	Ghasem Rezaei	Yousef Ghaderian; Habibollah Akhlaghi	4th
2016	Budapest	—	—	—	—N/a
2017	Paris	—	—	Mohammad Ali Geraei; Saeid Abdevali; Hossein Nouri	3rd
2018	Budapest	—	—	Mehdi Aliyari	11th
2019	Nur-Sultan	—	—	Alireza Nejati; Mohammad Ali Geraei; Saeid Abdevali	4th
2021	Oslo	Meisam Dalkhani; Mohammad Reza Geraei; Mohammad Hadi Saravi; Ali Akbar Yousefi	—	Mohammad Ali Geraei; Pejman Poshtam	2nd
2022	Belgrade	—	Mohammad Reza Geraei; Amin Mirzazadeh	Mohammad Hadi Saravi	4th
2023	Belgrade	Amin Mirzazadeh	Alireza Mohmadi	Pouya Dadmarz; Mohammad Reza Geraei; Mohammad Hadi Saravi	2nd
2024	Tirana	Mohammad Ali Geraei	Pouya Dadmarz	—	2nd
2025	Zagreb	Saeid Esmaeili; Gholamreza Farrokhi; Mohammad Hadi Saravi; Amin Mirzazadeh	Payam Ahmadi; Alireza Mohmadi	Mohammad Mehdi Keshtkar; Danial Sohrabi	1st
2026	Astana	Saeid Esmaeili; Danial Sohrabi; Gholamreza Farrokhi; Fardin Hedayati	Payam Ahmadi; Ali Ahmadi Vafa; Alireza Mohmadi	Ali Oskoo; Mohammad Hadi Saravi	1st

== Asian Games ==
Year	Venue	Medalists		
Year	Venue	Gold	Silver	Bronze
1962		Did not participate		
1974	Tehran	Rahim Aliabadi; Hossein Touranian; Akbar Yadollahi; Mohammad Dalirian; Hashem Ghanbari; Jalal Karimi; Bahram Moshtaghi; Moslem Eskandar-Filabi	Khosro Nezafatdoust	—
1986	Seoul	Reza Soukhtehsaraei	Abdolkarim Kakahaji; Reza Andouz	Ahad Javansalehi; Fereydoun Behnampour
1990	Beijing	—	Hassan Yousefi Afshar; Mohammad Naderi; Alireza Lorestani	Reza Simkhah; Ahad Pazaj; Masoud Ghadimi
1994	Hiroshima	—	Reza Simkhah; Hassan Babak	—
1998	Bangkok	Mehdi Sabzali	—	—
2002	Busan	—	—	Parviz Zeidvand; Masoud Hashemzadeh; Alireza Gharibi
2006	Doha	—	Jasem Amiri; Davoud Abedinzadeh; Masoud Hashemzadeh; Mehdi Sharabiani	Hamid Reihani
2010	Guangzhou	Omid Norouzi; Saeid Abdevali; Taleb Nematpour; Babak Ghorbani	—	Farshad Alizadeh
2014	Incheon	Habibollah Akhlaghi; Mehdi Aliyari	—	Afshin Biabangard; Saeid Abdevali; Payam Boveiri; Mojtaba Karimfar; Bashir Babajanzadeh
2018	Jakarta	Mohammad Ali Geraei; Hossein Nouri	—	Mehrdad Mardani; Mohammad Reza Geraei
2022	Hangzhou	Mohammad Hadi Saravi; Amin Mirzazadeh	Amin Kavianinejad; Nasser Alizadeh	Danial Sohrabi
2026	Nagoya	Alireza Abdevali; Amin Mirzazadeh	—	Mehdi Bali

== Asian Championships ==
Year	Venue	Medalists			Team rank
Year	Venue	Gold	Silver	Bronze	Team rank
1983	Tehran	Morteza Papinia; Ali Khani; Hossein Touranian; Mohammad Bana; Mousa Tabatabaei; Fereydoun Behnampour; Hassan Babak; Davoud Ayoub	Gholam Mohseni; Hesamoddin Jafari	—	1st
1987	Mumbai	Ahad Pazaj; Mohammad Naderi	Mohsen Taheri; Hamid Rahimi; Mousa Tabatabaei; Hassan Babak	Nasser Khalili	2nd
1989	Oarai	Alireza Lorestani	Abdolkarim Kakahaji; Hassan Yousefi Afshar; Hassan Babak; Mohammad Naderi	Abdollah Chamangoli	3rd
1991	Tehran	Reza Simkhah; Hassan Yousefi Afshar; Abdollah Chamangoli; Alireza Lorestani	Ahad Javansalehi; Jaber Abbaszadeh	—	2nd
1992	Tehran	Ahad Pazaj; Abdollah Chamangoli; Ahad Javansalehi; Hassan Babak	Ali Khoshtinat	Majid Jahandideh; Hamid Samadi; Jaber Abbaszadeh	2nd
1993	Hiroshima	Ahad Pazaj	Abdollah Chamangoli	Ahad Javansalehi; Jaber Abbaszadeh; Abdollah Azizi	2nd
1995	Manila	Alireza Lorestani	Majid Mousavi; Ayoub Namdari	Ahad Pazaj; Behrouz Jamshidi	3rd
1996	Xiaoshan	—	Ahad Pazaj	—	6th
1997	Tehran	—	—	Mehdi Nassiri; Behrouz Jamshidi; Dariush Ghalavand; Mehdi Sabzali	3rd
1999	Tashkent	—	Alireza Gharibi	Mohammad Nikounahad; Mehdi Sharabiani	5th
2000	Seoul	Ali Ashkani	Parviz Zeidvand; Alireza Gharibi	Hassan Rangraz; Hossein Marashian; Rasoul Jazini	2nd
2001	Ulaanbaatar	Ali Ashkani; Mehdi Nassiri; Parviz Zeidvand; Alireza Gharibi	Hassan Rangraz; Hossein Marashian; Rasoul Jazini	—	1st
2003	New Delhi	Parviz Zeidvand	Hamid Bavafa; Ali Ashkani; Masoud Hashemzadeh	Hossein Marashian; Alireza Gharibi	1st
2004	Almaty	—	—	Hassan Rangraz; Sajjad Barzi	4th
2005	Wuhan	Ali Ashkani	—	Masoud Hashemzadeh; Sajjad Barzi	6th
2006	Almaty	Davoud Abedinzadeh	Sajjad Barzi	Hamid Banitamim; Ghasem Rezaei	3rd
2007	Bishkek	Hamid Sourian; Saman Tahmasebi; Ghasem Rezaei	Hamid Bavafa; Mehdi Sharabiani	Ali Mohammadi; Mojtaba Babajanzadeh	1st
2008	Jeju City	Hamid Sourian; Ghasem Rezaei; Masoud Hashemzadeh	Taleb Nematpour	Mehdi Mohammadi	1st
2009	Pattaya	Farshad Alizadeh; Taleb Nematpour; Amir Aliakbari; Masoud Hashemzadeh	—	Saeid Abdevali	1st
2010	New Delhi	Babak Ghorbani; Mohammad Ghorbani	—	Mehdi Mohammadi; Davoud Abedinzadeh	4th
2011	Tashkent	Ali Mohammadi; Mohsen Ghasemi; Davoud Akhbari; Bashir Babajanzadeh	Davoud Gilneirang	Mohsen Hajipour; Abdolmohammad Papi	1st
2012	Gumi	Hadi Alizadeh; Habibollah Akhlaghi; Davoud Gilneirang	Afshin Biabangard	Mohammad Ghorbani	1st
2013	New Delhi	—	Abdolmohammad Papi; Mehdi Zeidvand; Hadi Alizadeh	Taleb Nematpour; Davoud Gilneirang	2nd
2014	Astana	Behnam Mehdizadeh	Yousef Ghaderian	Saeid Abdevali; Mojtaba Karimfar; Ali Aliyari	3rd
2015	Doha	Ramin Taheri; Yousef Ghaderian; Mehdi Aliyari	Mohammad Ali Geraei	Payam Boveiri; Bashir Babajanzadeh	1st
2016	Bangkok	Afshin Biabangard; Ramin Taheri; Mehdi Aliyari; Amir Ghasemi Monjazi	Saman Abdevali	Mehdi Zeidvand; Payam Boveiri	1st
2017	New Delhi	Ramin Taheri; Hossein Nouri; Mostafa Salehizadeh; Behnam Mehdizadeh	Afshin Biabangard	Saman Abdevali; Ali Arsalan	1st
2018	Bishkek	Hossein Nouri; Behnam Mehdizadeh	Mohammad Ali Geraei	—	6th
2019	Xi'an	Mohammad Reza Geraei; Saeid Abdevali; Hossein Nouri; Amir Ghasemi Monjazi	—	Saman Abdevali; Mohammad Ali Geraei; Mehdi Aliyari	1st
2020	New Delhi	Pouya Nasserpour; Amin Kavianinejad; Mehdi Ebrahimi; Mohammad Hadi Saravi; Amin Mirzazadeh	Pejman Poshtam	Mehdi Mohsennejad; Meisam Dalkhani; Hossein Asadi	1st
2021	Almaty	Pejman Poshtam; Nasser Alizadeh; Mehdi Bali; Ali Akbar Yousefi	Mehdi Mohsennejad; Meisam Dalkhani	Pouya Dadmarz; Hossein Asadi; Amin Kavianinejad	1st
2022	Ulaanbaatar	Mohammad Reza Mokhtari; Rasoul Garmsiri; Nasser Alizadeh; Mehdi Bali	Mehdi Mohsennejad	Iman Mohammadi; Aref Habibollahi	2nd
2023	Astana	Pouya Dadmarz; Iman Mohammadi; Nasser Alizadeh; Mehdi Bali; Amin Mirzazadeh	Sajjad Imentalab; Amin Kavianinejad; Alireza Mohmadi	—	1st
2024	Bishkek	Saeid Esmaeili; Nasser Alizadeh; Mohammad Hadi Saravi; Amin Mirzazadeh	Pouya Dadmarz; Mohammad Reza Rostami; Rasoul Garmsiri	Amir Reza Dehbozorgi; Iman Mohammadi	1st
2025	Amman	Saeid Esmaeili; Danial Sohrabi; Mohammad Naghousi; Mohammad Hadi Saravi; Fardin Hedayati	Mohammad Mehdi Keshtkar; Alireza Abdevali; Yasin Yazdi	—	1st
2026	Bishkek	Mohammad Hadi Saravi; Amin Mirzazadeh	Erfan Jarkani; Mohammad Javad Rezaei; Ali Oskoo; Mohammad Amin Hosseini; Gholamreza Farrokhi	Mohammad Hosseinvand; Ali Ahmadi Vafa; Ahmad Reza Mohsennejad	1st

== See also ==
- Iranian Premier Wrestling League
- List of Iran national freestyle wrestling medalists
