= Iranian results in men's Greco-Roman wrestling =

Wrestlers from Iran have taken part in most of the major international men's Greco-Roman wrestling competitions over the years, in particular the Olympic Games and World Wrestling Championships.

== Results by year ==
Legend

1	Gold medalist
2	Silver medalist
3	Bronze medalist
	Olympics
~~Name~~	Did not start

DQ	Disqualified after winning a medal
DQ	Disqualified during the competition
X	Rank not available
—N/a	Event not held

=== 1950–1961 ===
Year	TR	52 kg	57 kg	62 kg	67 kg	73 kg	79 kg	87 kg	+87 kg
1950									
1952	Did not participate								
1953	Did not participate								
1955									
1956	Did not participate								
1958									
1960	—N/a	Mohammad Paziraei (3)	Ali Banihashemi (X)	Hossein Mollaghasemi (6)	No wrestler	No wrestler	Mansour Hazrati (X)	No wrestler	No wrestler
1961				Alireza Ghelichkhani (3)					

=== 1962–1968 ===
Year	TR	52 kg	57 kg	63 kg	70 kg	78 kg	87 kg	97 kg	+97 kg
1962									
1963	Did not participate								
1964	—N/a	Ahmad Khoshouei (X)	Siavash Shafizadeh (X)	Rasoul Mirmalek (6)	Hossein Mollaghasemi (X)	Asghar Zoghian (X)	No wrestler	No wrestler	No wrestler
1965									
1966				Iraj Khorshidfar (3)					
1967									
1968	—N/a	No wrestler	No wrestler	Hossein Moarreb (X)	No wrestler	No wrestler	No wrestler	No wrestler	No wrestler

=== 1969–1996 ===
Year	TR	48 kg	52 kg	57 kg	62 kg	68 kg	74 kg	82 kg	90 kg	100 kg	+100 kg / 130 kg
1969	7th	Rahim Aliabadi (2)	Firouz Alizadeh (1)	Mehdi Ahangaran (X)	Akbar Yadollahi (X)	Kazem Gholami (X)	No wrestler	No wrestler	No wrestler	No wrestler	No wrestler
1970	16th	Rahim Aliabadi (5)	Firouz Alizadeh (X)	Mehdi Ahangaran (6)	Akbar Yadollahi (X)	No wrestler	Hashem Ghanbari (X)	No wrestler	No wrestler	No wrestler	No wrestler
1971	NR	Rahim Aliabadi (8)	Mehdi Houryar (13)	Firouz Alizadeh (8)	Akbar Yadollahi (22)	Hossein Moarreb (12)	Hashem Ghanbari (16)	Mohammad Hossein Jamal (21)	Bahram Moshtaghi (11)	Nosrat Goudarzi (9)	Jamshid Noshad (12)
1972	—N/a	Rahim Aliabadi (2)	Mehdi Houryar (15)	Firouz Alizadeh (27)	No wrestler	Mohammad Dalirian (15)	No wrestler	No wrestler	No wrestler	No wrestler	No wrestler
1973			Rahim Aliabadi (3)								
1974											
1975											
1976	—N/a	Khalil Rashid-Mohammadzadeh (8)	Morad Ali Shirani (6)	No wrestler	Gholamreza Ghassab (9)	Jafar Alizadeh (14)	No wrestler	Houshang Montazeralzohour (13)	Hashem Kolahi (9)	Bahram Moshtaghi (11)	No wrestler
1977	9th	Keramat Zerang (4)	Morad Ali Shirani (3)	No wrestler	Mohammad Bana (X)	Jafar Alizadeh (X)	No wrestler	No wrestler	Hashem Kolahi (X)	No wrestler	No wrestler
1978	NR	No wrestler	No wrestler	Hossein Touranian (X)	No wrestler	No wrestler	No wrestler	No wrestler	No wrestler	No wrestler	No wrestler
1979	Did not participate										
1980	Did not participate										
1981	18th	Abdolkarim Kakahaji (X)	Askari Mohammadian (X)	Jamshid Jamalizadeh (X)	Keivan Behrouzmanesh (X)	Mohammad Bana (5)	Jafar Alizadeh (X)	Fereydoun Behnampour (X)	No wrestler	No wrestler	No wrestler
1982	Did not participate										
1983	13th	No wrestler	No wrestler	No wrestler	Hossein Touranian (16)	Mohammad Bana (2)	Bijan Seifkhani (9)	Fereydoun Behnampour (16)	No wrestler	No wrestler	No wrestler
1984	Did not participate										
1985	NR	Morteza Papinia (X)	Rasoul Shirani (X)	Hossein Niknejad (X)	No wrestler	Mohammad Bana (X)	Mousa Tabatabaei (X)	No wrestler	No wrestler	No wrestler	No wrestler
1986	Did not participate										
1987	Did not participate										
1988	—N/a	Reza Simkhah (13)	Abdolkarim Kakahaji (14)	Ahad Pazaj (20)	Ahad Javansalehi (10)	Masoud Ghadimi (21)	Reza Andouz (16)	Mehdi Moradi Ganjeh (16)	No wrestler	No wrestler	No wrestler
1989	Did not participate										
1990	22nd	No wrestler	No wrestler	Ahad Pazaj (X)	Hassan Yousefi Afshar (8)	No wrestler	Masoud Ghadimi (X)	No wrestler	No wrestler	No wrestler	No wrestler
1991	17th	Reza Simkhah (2)	Abdolkarim Kakahaji (13)	No wrestler	Hassan Yousefi Afshar (15)	Abdollah Chamangoli (10)	No wrestler	No wrestler	No wrestler	Jaber Abbaszadeh (19)	Alireza Lorestani (19)
1992	—N/a	Reza Simkhah (6)	Majid Jahandideh (15)	No wrestler	Ahad Pazaj (13)	Abdollah Chamangoli (6)	Ahad Javansalehi (18)	No wrestler	Hassan Babak (5)	No wrestler	No wrestler
1993	NR	Behrouz Heidarzadeh (X)	No wrestler	Shahriar Salehi (X)	Rasoul Shirani (X)	Abdollah Chamangoli (X)	No wrestler	Mohammad Sharabiani (X)	No wrestler	No wrestler	No wrestler
1994	Did not participate										
1995	25th	Mohsen Sourian (8)	Bahman Tayyebi (24)	No wrestler	Ahad Pazaj (8)	No wrestler	Majid Mousavi (24)	No wrestler	No wrestler	No wrestler	Alireza Lorestani (15)
1996	—N/a	No wrestler	No wrestler	No wrestler	Ahad Pazaj (11)	No wrestler	No wrestler	No wrestler	No wrestler	No wrestler	No wrestler

=== 1997–2001 ===
Year	TR	54 kg	58 kg	63 kg	69 kg	76 kg	85 kg	97 kg	130 kg
1997	Did not participate								
1998	20th	Bahman Tayyebi (27)	Mehdi Nassiri (18)	Ahad Pazaj (11)	No wrestler	No wrestler	Behrouz Jamshidi (6)	Mohammad Sharabiani (9)	Mehdi Sabzali (10)
1999	26th	Hassan Rangraz (34)	Ali Ashkani (9)	Mehdi Nassiri (20)	Parviz Zeidvand (7)	Hossein Marashian (31)	Behrouz Jamshidi ~~(3)~~ (DQ)	Rasoul Jazini (32)	Mohammad Sharabiani (15)
2000	—N/a	Hassan Rangraz (14)	Ali Ashkani (5)	No wrestler	Parviz Zeidvand (16)	No wrestler	No wrestler	No wrestler	No wrestler
2001	5th	Hassan Rangraz (1)	Ali Ashkani (6)	Mehdi Nassiri (11)	Parviz Zeidvand (6)	Majid Ramezani (18)	Masoud Hashemzadeh (15)	Ehsan Karimfar (8)	Alireza Gharibi (9)

=== 2002–2013 ===
Year	TR	55 kg	60 kg	66 kg	74 kg	84 kg	96 kg	120 kg
2002	14th	Hassan Rangraz (3)	Bahman Tayyebi (22)	Mehdi Hodaei (6)	No wrestler	No wrestler	No wrestler	Payam Zarinpour (21)
2003	28th	Hassan Rangraz (7)	Ali Ashkani (21)	Parviz Zeidvand (16)	Shahram Taherzadeh (32)	Behrouz Jamshidi (34)	Masoud Hashemzadeh (15)	Alireza Gharibi (14)
2004	—N/a	Hassan Rangraz (9)	Ali Ashkani (11)	Parviz Zeidvand (DQ)	No wrestler	Behrouz Jamshidi (9)	Masoud Hashemzadeh (DQ)	Sajjad Barzi (4)
2005	10th	Hamid Sourian (1)	Ali Ashkani (2)	Mehdi Tavakkoli (18)	Mehdi Mohammadi (13)	Ghasem Rezaei (27)	Reza Zeidvand (16)	Mehdi Sharabiani (16)
2006	5th	Hamid Sourian (1)	Ali Ashkani (7)	Ali Mohammadi (29)	Davoud Abedinzadeh (10)	Saman Tahmasebi (3)	Reza Farzizadeh (22)	Masoud Hashemzadeh (7)
2007	4th	Hamid Sourian (1)	Ali Ashkani (13)	Ali Mohammadi (12)	Mehdi Mohammadi (18)	Saman Tahmasebi (3)	Ghasem Rezaei (3)	Masoud Hashemzadeh (22)
2008	—N/a	Hamid Sourian (5)	No wrestler	Ali Mohammadi (11)	No wrestler	Saman Tahmasebi (11)	Ghasem Rezaei (15)	Masoud Hashemzadeh (14)
2009	2nd	Hamid Sourian (1)	Omid Norouzi (10)	Afshin Biabangard (7)	Farshad Alizadeh (3)	Habibollah Akhlaghi (3)	Amir Aliakbari (3)	Masoud Hashemzadeh (17)
2010	8th	Hamid Sourian (1)	Omid Norouzi (9)	Saeid Abdevali (14)	Mehdi Mohammadi (23)	~~Taleb Nematpour~~ (31)	Amir Aliakbari (1)	Mohammad Ghorbani (24)
2011	3rd	Mohsen Hajipour (22)	Omid Norouzi (1)	Saeid Abdevali (1)	Farshad Alizadeh (9)	Habibollah Akhlaghi (26)	~~Ghasem Rezaei~~	Bashir Babajanzadeh (3)
2012	—N/a	Hamid Sourian (1)	Omid Norouzi (1)	Saeid Abdevali (11)	No wrestler	Habibollah Akhlaghi (13)	Ghasem Rezaei (1)	Bashir Babajanzadeh (7)
2013	8th	Mohammad Faghiri (19)	Mohammad Nourbakhsh (12)	Afshin Biabangard (8)	Hadi Alizadeh (32)	Taleb Nematpour (1)	Mehdi Aliyari (5)	Amir Aliakbari ~~(1)~~ (DQ)

=== 2014–2017 ===
Year	TR	59 kg	66 kg	71 kg	75 kg	80 kg	85 kg	98 kg	130 kg
2014	1st	Hamid Sourian (1)	Omid Norouzi (2)	Afshin Biabangard (3)	Hadi Alizadeh (16)	Habibollah Akhlaghi (7)	Mojtaba Karimfar (14)	Ghasem Rezaei (3)	Behnam Mehdizadeh (8)
2015	4th	Hamid Sourian (DQ)	Mehdi Zeidvand (34)	Afshin Biabangard (14)	Saeid Abdevali (5)	Yousef Ghaderian (3)	Habibollah Akhlaghi (3)	Ghasem Rezaei (2)	Mehdi Aliyari (25)
2016	—N/a	Hamid Sourian (11)	Omid Norouzi (10)	—N/a	Saeid Abdevali (3)	—N/a	Habibollah Akhlaghi (7)	Ghasem Rezaei (3)	Bashir Babajanzadeh (10)
2016	—N/a	—N/a	—N/a	Afshin Biabangard (19)	—N/a	Yousef Ghaderian (19)	—N/a	—N/a	—N/a
2017	3rd	Mehrdad Mardani (8)	Mohammad Eliasi (5)	Mohammad Ali Geraei (3)	Saeid Abdevali (3)	Yousef Ghaderian (15)	Hossein Nouri (3)	Mostafa Salehizadeh (12)	Shahab Ghourehjili (8)

=== 2018– ===
Year	TR	55 kg	60 kg	63 kg	67 kg	72 kg	77 kg	82 kg	87 kg	97 kg	130 kg
2018	11th	Moslem Naderi (15)	Mehrdad Mardani (23)	Mohsen Hajipour (11)	Mohammad Reza Geraei (8)	Mohammad Ali Geraei (9)	Pejman Poshtam (23)	Saeid Abdevali (5)	Hossein Nouri (9)	Mehdi Aliyari (3)	Shahab Ghourehjili (16)
2019	4th	Pouya Nasserpour (10)	Alireza Nejati (3)	Meisam Dalkhani (5)	Hamed Tab (26)	Amin Kavianinejad (19)	Mohammad Ali Geraei (3)	Saeid Abdevali (3)	Ramin Taheri (12)	Mohammad Hadi Saravi (7)	Amir Ghasemi Monjazi (5)
2020	—N/a	—N/a	Alireza Nejati (10)	—N/a	Mohammad Reza Geraei (1)	—N/a	Mohammad Ali Geraei (5)	—N/a	No wrestler	Mohammad Hadi Saravi (3)	Amin Mirzazadeh (5)
2021	2nd	Sajjad Abbaspour (11)	Mehrdad Mardani (8)	Meisam Dalkhani (1)	Mohammad Reza Geraei (1)	Mohammad Reza Mokhtari (5)	Mohammad Ali Geraei (3)	Pejman Poshtam (3)	Ramin Taheri (12)	Mohammad Hadi Saravi (1)	Ali Akbar Yousefi (1)
2022	4th	Pouya Dadmarz (8)	Mehdi Mohsennejad (11)	Alireza Nejati (5)	Mohammad Reza Geraei (2)	Mohammad Reza Mokhtari (19)	Mohammad Ali Geraei (16)	Pejman Poshtam (12)	Nasser Alizadeh (5)	Mohammad Hadi Saravi (3)	Amin Mirzazadeh (2)
2023	2nd	Pouya Dadmarz (3)	Mehdi Mohsennejad (5)	Iman Mohammadi (16)	Mohammad Reza Geraei (3)	Danial Sohrabi (10)	Mohammad Ali Geraei (18)	Alireza Mohmadi (2)	Nasser Alizadeh (16)	Mohammad Hadi Saravi (3)	Amin Mirzazadeh (1)
2024	—N/a	—N/a	Mehdi Mohsennejad (5)	—N/a	Saeid Esmaeili (1)	—N/a	Amin Kavianinejad (8)	—N/a	Alireza Mohmadi (2)	Mohammad Hadi Saravi (1)	Amin Mirzazadeh (3)
2024	2nd	Pouya Dadmarz (2)	—N/a	Iman Mohammadi (8)	—N/a	Mohammad Reza Geraei (17)	—N/a	Mohammad Ali Geraei (1)	—N/a	—N/a	—N/a
2025	1st	Payam Ahmadi (2)	Ali Ahmadi Vafa (17)	Mohammad Mehdi Keshtkar (3)	Saeid Esmaeili (1)	Danial Sohrabi (3)	Alireza Abdevali (5)	Gholamreza Farrokhi (1)	Alireza Mohmadi (2)	Mohammad Hadi Saravi (1)	Amin Mirzazadeh (1)
2026	1st	Payam Ahmadi (2)	Ali Ahmadi Vafa (2)	Mohammad Mehdi Keshtkar (10)	Saeid Esmaeili (1)	Danial Sohrabi (1)	Ali Oskoo (3)	Gholamreza Farrokhi (1)	Alireza Mohmadi (2)	Mohammad Hadi Saravi (3)	Fardin Hedayati (1)

== See also ==
- List of World and Olympic Champions in Greco-Roman wrestling
- List of Cadet, Junior, Espoir and U-23 World Champions in men's Greco-Roman wrestling
- List of Iran national Greco-Roman wrestling medalists
- Iranian results in men's freestyle wrestling
