= Iran at the 1990 Asian Games =

- IOC code: IRN
- NOC: National Olympic Committee of the Islamic Republic of Iran

in Beijing
- Competitors: 128 in 13 sports
- Flag bearer: Alireza Lorestani
- Medals Ranked 5th: Gold 4 Silver 6 Bronze 8 Total 18

Asian Games appearances (overview)
- 1951; 1954; 1958; 1962; 1966; 1970; 1974; 1978; 1982; 1986; 1990; 1994; 1998; 2002; 2006; 2010; 2014; 2018; 2022; 2026

Iran participated in the 1990 Asian Games held in the capital city of Beijing. This country is ranked 5th with only 4 gold medals in this edition of the Asiad.

== Medal summary ==
=== Medals by sport ===
Sport	Gold	Silver	Bronze	Total
Athletics			1	1
Boxing		1	2	3
Football	1			1
Wrestling	3	5	5	13
Total	4	6	8	18

=== Medalists ===
Medal	Name	Sport	Event
Gold	Ahmad Reza Abedzadeh; Javad Zarincheh; Mojtaba Moharrami; Mehdi Fonounizadeh; Mohammad Panjali; Sirous Ghayeghran; Morteza Kermani Moghaddam; Shahrokh Bayani; Mehdi Abtahi; Samad Marfavi; Nasser Mohammadkhani; Shahin Bayani; Mohsen Ashouri; Reza Hassanzadeh; Nader Mohammadkhani; Ali Eftekhari; Farshad Pious; Majid Namjoo-Motlagh; Mohammad Hassan Ansarifard; Behzad Gholampour	Football	Men
Gold	Oveis Mallah	Wrestling	Men's freestyle 52 kg
Gold	Behrouz Yari	Wrestling	Men's freestyle 74 kg
Gold	Reza Soukhtehsaraei	Wrestling	Men's freestyle 130 kg
Silver	Ali Asghar Kazemi	Boxing	Men's 81 kg
Silver	Rasoul Khadem	Wrestling	Men's freestyle 68 kg
Silver	Ayat Vagozari	Wrestling	Men's freestyle 82 kg
Silver	Hassan Yousefi Afshar	Wrestling	Men's Greco-Roman 62 kg
Silver	Mohammad Naderi	Wrestling	Men's Greco-Roman 100 kg
Silver	Alireza Lorestani	Wrestling	Men's Greco-Roman 130 kg
Bronze	Mansour Ghorbani	Athletics	Men's discus throw
Bronze	Siamak Varzideh	Boxing	Men's 75 kg
Bronze	Iraj Kiarostami	Boxing	Men's +91 kg
Bronze	Jalil Jahanshahi	Wrestling	Men's freestyle 57 kg
Bronze	Ayoub Baninosrat	Wrestling	Men's freestyle 90 kg
Bronze	Reza Simkhah	Wrestling	Men's Greco-Roman 48 kg
Bronze	Ahad Pazaj	Wrestling	Men's Greco-Roman 57 kg
Bronze	Masoud Ghadimi	Wrestling	Men's Greco-Roman 74 kg

== Results by event ==
=== Aquatics ===
==== Water polo ====
Men

Team	Rank
Alireza Amirian; Aram Eidipour; Mehrzad Eidipour; Nader Ghafouri; Ahmad Hosseini; Ali Moheb; Javad Pazirofteh; Hossein Rezaei; Davoud Rezasoltani; Mohsen Rezvani; Mehrdad Saleh; Hamid Shabangiz; Sirous Taherian; Coach: Mansour Garousi	6

=== Athletics ===
Athlete	Event	Round 1		Semifinal		Final	Rank
Athlete	Event	Time	Rank	Time	Rank	Time	Rank
Abdolsadegh Gorgani	Men's 100 m	10.60	2 Q	10.84	5	Did not advance	10
Abdolsadegh Gorgani	Men's 200 m	21.67	3 Q	22.07	6	Did not advance	10
Faramarz Roustaeifar	Men's 800 m	1:50.36	2 Q	—N/a		1:51.34	7
Hamid Sajjadi	Men's 1500 m	3:46.65	5 q	—N/a		3:47.92	9
Hokmali Kazemi	Men's 400 m hurdles	54.94	7	—N/a		Did not advance	13
Hesam Zare	Men's 400 m hurdles	51.72	6	—N/a		Did not advance	9
Hamid Sajjadi	Men's 3000 m steeplechase	—N/a				8:42.17	4
Vajihollah Shahri; Hesam Zare; Hokmali Kazemi; Faramarz Roustaeifar	Men's 4 × 400 m relay	3:12.01	4 q	—N/a		3:14.94	7
Alireza Ghiasi	Men's high jump	—N/a				2.05 m	9
Hossein Shayan	Men's high jump	—N/a				2.10 m	7
Mansour Ghorbani	Men's discus throw	—N/a				52.70 m	3rd place, bronze medalist(s)

=== Basketball ===
Team	Event	Preliminary round			Second round				Semifinal	Final	Rank
Team	Event	Round 1	Round 2	Rank	Round 1	Round 2	Round 3	Rank	Semifinal	Final	Rank
Iran	Men	Hong Kong; W 86–79	China; L 67–89	2 Q	Chinese Taipei; L 66–77	Japan; W 71–70	South Korea; L 88–113	4	Did not advance	7th place match North Korea; W 88–71	7
Roster: Faramarz Khaleghi; Mehran Shahintab; Mohammad Kasaeipour; Ali Tofigh; Faramarz Pouresfahani; Saeid Armaghani; Mehran Hatami; Mohsen Sadeghzadeh; Javad Delganeh; Farzad Kouhian; Mostafa Hashemi; Mohammad Mehdi Izadpanah; Coach: Asadollah Kabir

=== Football ===
Men

Squad list	Preliminary round		Quarterfinal	Semifinal	Final	Rank
Squad list	Group B	Rank	Quarterfinal	Semifinal	Final	Rank
Ahmad Reza Abedzadeh; Javad Zarincheh; Mojtaba Moharrami; Mehdi Fonounizadeh; Mohammad Panjali; Sirous Ghayeghran; Morteza Kermani Moghaddam; Shahrokh Bayani; Mehdi Abtahi; Samad Marfavi; Nasser Mohammadkhani; Shahin Bayani; Behzad Gholampour; Reza Hassanzadeh; Nader Mohammadkhani; Ali Eftekhari; Farshad Pious; Majid Namjoo-Motlagh; Mohammad Hassan Ansarifard; Mohsen Ashouri; Coach: Ali Parvin	Malaysia; W 3–0	1 Q	Japan; W 1–0	South Korea; W 1–0	North Korea; W 0–0, 4–1 Pen	Gold medal
Ahmad Reza Abedzadeh; Javad Zarincheh; Mojtaba Moharrami; Mehdi Fonounizadeh; Mohammad Panjali; Sirous Ghayeghran; Morteza Kermani Moghaddam; Shahrokh Bayani; Mehdi Abtahi; Samad Marfavi; Nasser Mohammadkhani; Shahin Bayani; Behzad Gholampour; Reza Hassanzadeh; Nader Mohammadkhani; Ali Eftekhari; Farshad Pious; Majid Namjoo-Motlagh; Mohammad Hassan Ansarifard; Mohsen Ashouri; Coach: Ali Parvin	North Korea; W 2–1	1 Q	Japan; W 1–0	South Korea; W 1–0	North Korea; W 0–0, 4–1 Pen	Gold medal

=== Weightlifting ===
Athlete	Event	Snatch		Clean & Jerk		Total	
Athlete	Event	Result	Rank	Result	Rank	Result	Rank
Homayoun Bastami	Men's 82.5 kg	142.5	5	175.0	4	317.5	4

=== Wrestling ===
Men's freestyle

Athlete	Event	Rank
Mohammad Panahzadeh	48 kg	EL
Oveis Mallah	52 kg	Gold medal
Jalil Jahanshahi	57 kg	Bronze medal
Akbar Fallah	62 kg	5
Rasoul Khadem	68 kg	Silver medal
Behrouz Yari	74 kg	Gold medal
Ayat Vagozari	82 kg	Silver medal
Ayoub Baninosrat	90 kg	Bronze medal
?	100 kg	EL
Reza Soukhtehsaraei	130 kg	Gold medal

Men's Greco-Roman

Athlete	Event	Rank
Reza Simkhah	48 kg	Bronze medal
Jalaleddin Fattah	52 kg	5
Ahad Pazaj	57 kg	Bronze medal
Hassan Yousefi Afshar	62 kg	Silver medal
Nader Khalili	68 kg	4
Masoud Ghadimi	74 kg	Bronze medal
Ali Koshtinat	82 kg	4
Hassan Babak	90 kg	4
Mohammad Naderi	100 kg	Silver medal
Alireza Lorestani	130 kg	Silver medal
