= Wrestling at the 1988 Summer Olympics – Men's freestyle 74 kg =

Men's freestyle 74 kg at the Games of the XXIV Olympiad
- Venue: Sangmu Gymnasium
- Dates: 28–30 September 1988
- Competitors: 30 from 30 nations

Medalists
1st place, gold medalist(s)		Kenny Monday	United States
2nd place, silver medalist(s)		Adlan Varaev	Soviet Union
3rd place, bronze medalist(s)		Rahmat Sofiadi	Bulgaria

The Men's Freestyle 74 kg at the 1988 Summer Olympics as part of the wrestling program were held at the Sangmu Gymnasium, Seongnam.

== Tournament results ==
The wrestlers are divided into 2 groups. The winner of each group decided by a double-elimination system.

Legend

- TF — Won by Fall
- SP — Won by Superiority, 12-14 points difference, the loser with points
- SO — Won by Superiority, 12-14 points difference, the loser without points
- ST — Won by Technical Superiority, 15 points difference
- PP — Won by Points, the loser with technical points
- PO — Won by Points, the loser without technical points
- P0 — Won by Passivity, scoring zero points
- P1 — Won by Passivity, while leading by 1-11 points
- PS — Won by Passivity, while leading by 12-14 points
- PA — Won by Opponent Injury
- DQ — Won by Forfeit
- DNA — Did not appear
- L — Losses
- ER — Round of Elimination
- CP — Classification Points
- TP — Technical Points

=== Eliminatory round ===
==== Group A ====
L		CP	TP		L
Round 1
1	Lars Gustafsson (SWE)	1-3 PP	1-2	Claudiu Tămăduianu (ROU)	0
1	David Harmon (IRL)	0-4 ST	0-16	Haitham Jibara (IRQ)	0
0	Adlan Varaev (URS)	3-1 PP	5-3	Ayat Vagozari (IRI)	1
0	Muhammad Anwar (PAK)	4-0 TF	4:24	Djibril Diouf (SEN)	1
1	Mamadou Diaw Diallo (GUI)	0-3 P1	5:07	Naresh Kumar (IND)	0
0	Uwe Westendorf (GDR)	3-1 PP	4-1	Monday Eguabor (NGR)	1
0	Rahmat Sofiadi (BUL)	4-0 TF	1:24	Jean Manga (CMR)	1
0	Yoshihiko Hara (JPN)			Bye	
Round 2
0	Yoshihiko Hara (JPN)	3-1 PP	7-1	Lars Gustafsson (SWE)	2
0	Claudiu Tămăduianu (ROU)	4-0 ST	15-0	David Harmon (IRL)	2
1	Haitham Jibara (IRQ)	0-3 PO	0-9	Adlan Varaev (URS)	0
1	Ayat Vagozari (IRI)	3-1 PP	20-9	Muhammad Anwar (PAK)	1
2	Djibril Diouf (SEN)	0-3 P1	7:25	Mamadou Diaw Diallo (GUI)	1
1	Naresh Kumar (IND)	1-3 PP	2-11	Uwe Westendorf (GDR)	0
2	Monday Eguabor (NGR)	0-4 ST	0-15	Rahmat Sofiadi (BUL)	0
1	Jean Manga (CMR)			Bye	
Round 3
2	Jean Manga (CMR)	0-4 TF	1:56	Yoshihiko Hara (JPN)	0
0	Claudiu Tămăduianu (ROU)	3-1 PP	7-4	Haitham Jibara (IRQ)	2
0	Adlan Varaev (URS)	4-0 TF	0:21	Muhammad Anwar (PAK)	2
1	Ayat Vagozari (IRI)	4-0 TF	5:51	Naresh Kumar (IND)	2
2	Mamadou Diaw Diallo (GUI)	0-4 TF	1:30	Uwe Westendorf (GDR)	0
0	Rahmat Sofiadi (BUL)			Bye	
Round 4
0	Rahmat Sofiadi (BUL)	3-1 PP	7-3	Yoshihiko Hara (JPN)	1
1	Claudiu Tămăduianu (ROU)	1-3 PP	1-10	Adlan Varaev (URS)	0
1	Ayat Vagozari (IRI)	3-1 PP	6-3	Uwe Westendorf (GDR)	1
Round 5
0	Rahmat Sofiadi (BUL)	3.5-.5 SP	14-2	Claudiu Tămăduianu (ROU)	2
2	Yoshihiko Hara (JPN)	1-3 PP	9-12	Ayat Vagozari (IRI)	1
0	Adlan Varaev (URS)	3-1 PP	4-2	Uwe Westendorf (GDR)	2
Round 6
1	Rahmat Sofiadi (BUL)	1-3 PP	2-5	Adlan Varaev (URS)	0
1	Ayat Vagozari (IRI)			Bye	
Round 7
2	Ayat Vagozari (IRI)	0-4 PA		Rahmat Sofiadi (BUL)	1
0	Adlan Varaev (URS)			Bye	

Wrestler	L	ER	CP
Adlan Varaev (URS)	0	-	19
Rahmat Sofiadi (BUL)	1	-	19.5
Ayat Vagozari (IRI)	2	7	14
Uwe Westendorf (GDR)	2	5	12
Claudiu Tămăduianu (ROU)	2	5	11.5
Yoshihiko Hara (JPN)	2	5	9
Haitham Jibara (IRQ)	2	3	5
Muhammad Anwar (PAK)	2	3	5
Naresh Kumar (IND)	2	3	4
Mamadou Diaw Diallo (GUI)	2	3	3
Jean Manga (CMR)	2	3	0
Lars Gustafsson (SWE)	2	2	2
Monday Eguabor (NGR)	2	2	1
David Harmon (IRL)	2	2	0
Djibril Diouf (SEN)	2	2	0

==== Group B ====
L		CP	TP		L
Round 1
1	Fitzlloyd Walker (GBR)	0–3.5 SO	0-12	Kenny Monday (USA)	0
1	Alfonso Jessel (MEX)	.5-3.5 SP	1-14	János Nagy (HUN)	0
0	Yoon Kyung-jae (KOR)	4-0 ST	15-0	Eusebio Serna (ESP)	1
0	Gary Holmes (CAN)	4-0 ST	15-0	Salem Ould Habib (MTN)	1
0	Lodoyn Enkhbayar (MGL)	3-1 PP	12-4	Bruno Beudet (FRA)	1
1	Abdullah Al-Ghrbi (YAR)	0-4 TF	0:42	Pekka Rauhala (FIN)	0
1	Uati Iutana (SAM)	0-4 TF	0:55	Adama Damballey (GAM)	0
0	Šaban Sejdiu (YUG)			Bye	
Round 2
0	Šaban Sejdiu (YUG)	3-0 PO	10-0	Fitzlloyd Walker (GBR)	2
0	Kenny Monday (USA)	4-0 TF	2:00	Alfonso Jessel (MEX)	2
1	János Nagy (HUN)	1-3 PP	3-9	Yoon Kyung-jae (KOR)	0
2	Eusebio Serna (ESP)	0-4 ST	0-16	Gary Holmes (CAN)	0
2	Salem Ould Habib (MTN)	0-4 TF	0:27	Lodoyn Enkhbayar (MGL)	0
1	Bruno Beudet (FRA)	4-0 ST	16-0	Abdullah Al-Ghrbi (YAR)	2
0	Pekka Rauhala (FIN)	4-0 TF	0:40	Uati Iutaga (SAM)	2
0	Adama Damballey (GAM)			Bye	
Round 3
1	Adama Damballey (GAM)	0-4 TF	0:54	Šaban Sejdiu (YUG)	0
0	Kenny Monday (USA)	3-1 PP	3-2	János Nagy (HUN)	2
1	Yoon Kyung-jae (KOR)	1-3 PP	1-8	Lodoyn Enkhbayar (MGL)	0
0	Gary Holmes (CAN)	3-1 PP	6-4	Bruno Beudet (FRA)	2
0	Pekka Rauhala (FIN)			Bye	
Round 4
0	Pekka Rauhala (FIN)	4-0 TF	1:20	Adama Damballey (GAM)	2
1	Šaban Sejdiu (YUG)	0-3 PO	0-4	Kenny Monday (USA)	0
1	Yoon Kyung-jae (KOR)	3-1 PP	7-4	Gary Holmes (CAN)	1
0	Lodoyn Enkhbayar (MGL)			Bye	
Round 5
0	Lodoyn Enkhbayar (MGL)	3-0 P1	5:39	Pekka Rauhala (FIN)	1
2	Šaban Sejdiu (YUG)	1-3 PP	2-4	Yoon Kyung-jae (KOR)	1
0	Kenny Monday (USA)	3-0 PO	6-0	Gary Holmes (CAN)	2
Round 6
1	Lodoyn Enkhbayar (MGL)	0-3 PO	0-2	Kenny Monday (USA)	0
1	Pekka Rauhala (FIN)	4-0 TF	2:19	Yoon Kyung-jae (KOR)	2
Round 7
2	Pekka Rauhala (FIN)	0-3 PO	0-7	Kenny Monday (USA)	0
1	Lodoyn Enkhbayar (MGL)			Bye	

Wrestler	L	ER	CP
Kenny Monday (USA)	0	-	22.5
Lodoyn Enkhbayar (MGL)	1	-	13
Pekka Rauhala (FIN)	2	7	16
Yoon Kyung-jae (KOR)	2	6	14
Gary Holmes (CAN)	2	5	12
Šaban Sejdiu (YUG)	2	5	8
Adama Damballey (GAM)	2	4	4
Bruno Beudet (FRA)	2	3	6
János Nagy (HUN)	2	3	5.5
Alfonso Jessel (MEX)	2	2	0.5
Fitzlloyd Walker (GBR)	2	2	0
Salem Ould Habib (MTN)	2	2	0
Uati Iutaga (SAM)	2	2	0
Eusebio Serna (ESP)	2	2	0
Abdullah Al-Ghrbi (YAR)	2	2	0

=== Final round ===
	CP	TP	
7th place match
Uwe Westendorf (GDR)	0-4 PA		Yoon Kyung-jae (KOR)
5th place match
Ayat Vagozari (IRI)	0-4 PA	3:00	Pekka Rauhala (FIN)
Bronze medal match
Rahmat Sofiadi (BUL)	3-1 PP	8-3	Lodoyn Enkhbayar (MGL)
Gold medal match
Adlan Varaev (URS)	1-3 PP	2-5	Kenny Monday (USA)

== Final standings ==
1. Kenny Monday (USA)
2. Adlan Varaev (URS)
3. Rahmat Sofiadi (BUL)
4. Lodoyn Enkhbayar (MGL)
5. Pekka Rauhala (FIN)
6. Ayat Vagozari (IRI)
7. Yoon Kyung-jae (KOR)
8. Uwe Westendorf (GDR)
