= Wrestling at the 1992 Summer Olympics – Men's freestyle 74 kg =

Men's freestyle 74 kg at the Games of the XXV Olympiad
- Venue: Institut Nacional d'Educació Física de Catalunya
- Dates: 4–6 August 1992
- Competitors: 18 from 18 nations

Medalists
1st place, gold medalist(s)		Park Jang-soon	South Korea
2nd place, silver medalist(s)		Kenny Monday	United States
3rd place, bronze medalist(s)		Amir Reza Khadem	Iran

The men's freestyle 74 kilograms at the 1992 Summer Olympics as part of the wrestling program were held at the Institut Nacional d'Educació Física de Catalunya from August 4 to August 6. The wrestlers are divided into 2 groups. The winner of each group decided by a double-elimination system.

== Results ==
Legend

- WO — Won by walkover

=== Elimination A ===
==== Round 1 ====
	Score		CP
Park Jang-soon (KOR)	8–2	Alexander Leipold (GER)	3–1 PP
János Nagy (HUN)	2–4	Gary Holmes (CAN)	1–3 PP
Romelio Salas (COL)	0–16	Yoshihiko Hara (JPN)	0–4 ST
Barend Labuschagne (RSA)	0–10	Amir Reza Khadem (IRI)	0–3 PO
Ioakeim Vasiliadis (GRE)		Bye	

==== Round 2 ====
	Score		CP
Ioakeim Vasiliadis (GRE)	0–4	Park Jang-soon (KOR)	0–3 PO
Alexander Leipold (GER)	1–2	János Nagy (HUN)	1–3 PP
Gary Holmes (CAN)	15–0	Romelio Salas (COL)	4–0 ST
Yoshihiko Hara (JPN)	7–1	Barend Labuschagne (RSA)	3–1 PP
Amir Reza Khadem (IRI)		Bye	

==== Round 3 ====
	Score		CP
Amir Reza Khadem (IRI)	4–2	Ioakeim Vasiliadis (GRE)	3–1 PP
Park Jang-soon (KOR)	5–0	János Nagy (HUN)	3–0 PO
Gary Holmes (CAN)	2–4	Yoshihiko Hara (JPN)	1–3 PP

==== Round 4 ====
	Score		CP
Amir Reza Khadem (IRI)	3–0	Gary Holmes (CAN)	3–0 PO
Park Jang-soon (KOR)	6–0	Yoshihiko Hara (JPN)	3–0 PO

==== Round 5 ====
	Score		CP
Amir Reza Khadem (IRI)	1–2	Park Jang-soon (KOR)	1–3 PP

- Yoshihiko Hara (JPN) was disqualified for failing to make weight before the fifth round.

==== Summary ====
Pos	Athlete	Pld	W	L	R	CP	TP
1	Park Jang-soon (KOR)	5	5	0	X (Note: KOR 3–1 IRI)	15	25
2	Amir Reza Khadem (IRI)	4	3	1	X	10	18
—	Yoshihiko Hara (JPN)	4	3	1	4	10	27
3	Gary Holmes (CAN)	4	2	2	4	8	21
4	János Nagy (HUN)	3	1	2	3	4	4
5	Ioakeim Vasiliadis (GRE)	2	0	2	3	1	2
—	Alexander Leipold (GER)	2	0	2	2	2	3
—	Barend Labuschagne (RSA)	2	0	2	2	1	1
—	Romelio Salas (COL)	2	0	2	2	0	0

Source: Official Report

=== Elimination B ===
==== Round 1 ====
	Score		CP
Lodoin Enkhbayar (MGL)	1–3	Valentin Zhelev (BUL)	1–3 PP
Selahattin Yiğit (TUR)	3–5	Magomedsalam Gadzhiev (EUN)	1–3 PP
Krzysztof Walencik (POL)	8–0	Konstantinos Iliadis (CYP)	3–0 PO
Milan Revický (TCH)	0–2	Kenny Monday (USA)	0–3 PP
Ho Bisgaltu (CHN)		Bye	

==== Round 2 ====
	Score		CP
Ho Bisgaltu (CHN)	2–4	Lodoin Enkhbayar (MGL)	1–3 PP
Valentin Zhelev (BUL)	1–2	Selahattin Yiğit (TUR)	1–3 PP
Magomedsalam Gadzhiev (EUN)	4–3	Krzysztof Walencik (POL)	3–1 PP
Konstantinos Iliadis (CYP)	0–3 Fall	Milan Revický (TCH)	0–4 TO
Kenny Monday (USA)		Bye	

==== Round 3 ====
	Score		CP
Kenny Monday (USA)	4–0	Ho Bisgaltu (CHN)	3–0 PO
Lodoin Enkhbayar (MGL)	6–5	Selahattin Yiğit (TUR)	3–1 PP
Valentin Zhelev (BUL)	2–3	Magomedsalam Gadzhiev (EUN)	1–3 PP
Krzysztof Walencik (POL)	1–0	Milan Revický (TCH)	3–0 PO

==== Round 4 ====
	Score		CP
Kenny Monday (USA)	6–0	Magomedsalam Gadzhiev (EUN)	3–0 PO
Lodoin Enkhbayar (MGL)	3–8	Krzysztof Walencik (POL)	1–3 PP

==== Round 5 ====
	Score		CP
Kenny Monday (USA)	2–0	Krzysztof Walencik (POL)	3–0 PO
Magomedsalam Gadzhiev (EUN)		Bye	

==== Summary ====
Pos	Athlete	Pld	W	L	R	CP	TP
1	Kenny Monday (USA)	4	4	0	X (Note: Classification points: USA 6, EUN 3, POL 1)	12	14
2	Magomedsalam Gadzhiev (EUN)	4	3	1	X	9	12
3	Krzysztof Walencik (POL)	5	3	2	X	10	20
4	Lodoin Enkhbayar (MGL)	4	2	2	4	8	14
—	Selahattin Yiğit (TUR)	3	1	2	3	5	10
5	Valentin Zhelev (BUL)	3	1	2	3	5	6
—	Milan Revický (TCH)	3	1	2	3	4	3
—	Ho Bisgaltu (CHN)	2	0	2	3	1	2
—	Konstantinos Iliadis (CYP)	2	0	2	2	0	0

Source: Official Report

=== Finals ===
	Score		CP
9th place match
Ioakeim Vasiliadis (GRE)	WO	Valentin Zhelev (BUL)	
7th place match
János Nagy (HUN)	WO	Lodoin Enkhbayar (MGL)	
5th place match
Gary Holmes (CAN)	WO	Krzysztof Walencik (POL)	
Bronze medal match
Amir Reza Khadem (IRI)	1–0	Magomedsalam Gadzhiev (EUN)	3–0 PO
Gold medal match
Park Jang-soon (KOR)	1–0	Kenny Monday (USA)	3–0 PO

== Final standing ==
Rank	Athlete
1st place, gold medalist(s)	Park Jang-soon (KOR)
2nd place, silver medalist(s)	Kenny Monday (USA)
3rd place, bronze medalist(s)	Amir Reza Khadem (IRI)
4	Magomedsalam Gadzhiev (EUN)
5	Krzysztof Walencik (POL)
6	Gary Holmes (CAN)
7	János Nagy (HUN)
8	Lodoin Enkhbayar (MGL)
9	Ioakeim Vasiliadis (GRE)
10	Valentin Zhelev (BUL)
