= Pakistan national Greco-Roman wrestling athletes =

Pakistan national amateur Greco-Roman wrestling athletes represents Pakistan in regional, continental, and world tournaments and matches sanctioned by the United World Wrestling (UWW).

== Olympics ==
Year	Venue	Medalists		
Year	Venue	Gold	Silver	Bronze
1947–present		Did not participate		

== World Championships ==
Year	Venue	Medalists			Team rank
Year	Venue	Gold	Silver	Bronze	Team rank
1947-present		Did not participate			

== Asian Games ==
Year	Venue	Medalists		
Year	Venue	Gold	Silver	Bronze
1962	Jakarta	Mohammad Niaza	Din Siraj; Mohamed Saeed; Muhammad Bashir	Ghulam Rasoul; Muhammad Fiaz; Muhamad Akthar
1974	Tehran	—	—	Muhammad Aslam
1986	Seoul	—	—	—
1990	Beijing	—	—	—

== Asian Championships ==
Year	Venue	Medalists			Team rank
Year	Venue	Gold	Silver	Bronze	Team rank
1983	Tehran	—	Sanaullah; Abdul Majeed Maruwala	Abid Hussain; Muhammad Anwar; Khalid Ahmed	5th
