= Western Samoa at the 1988 Summer Olympics =

- IOC code: WSM
- NOC: Samoa Association of Sports and National Olympic Committee Inc.

in Seoul
- Competitors: 11 in 4 sports
- Flag bearer: Henry Smith
- Medals: Gold 0 Silver 0 Bronze 0 Total 0

Summer Olympics appearances (overview)
- 1984; 1988; 1992; 1996; 2000; 2004; 2008; 2012; 2016; 2020; 2024

Western Samoa competed at the 1988 Summer Olympics in Seoul, South Korea.

== Competitors ==
The following is the list of number of competitors in the Games.

Sport	Men	Women	Total
Athletics	1	0	1
Boxing	7	–	7
Weightlifting	1	–	1
Wrestling	2	–	2
Total	11	0	11

== Athletics ==
=== Men ===
==== Field events ====
Athlete	Event	Qualifying		Final	
Athlete	Event	Distance	Position	Distance	Position
Henry Smith	Discus	49.40m	25	Did not advance	

== Boxing ==
Athlete	Event	Round of 64	Round of 32	Round of 16	Quarterfinals	Semifinals	Final
Athlete	Event	Opposition Result	Opposition Result	Opposition Result	Opposition Result	Opposition Result	Opposition Result
Likou Aliu (Note: also competed at the 1992 Summer Olympics)	Light Middleweight		Vincenzo Nardiello (ITA); L KOH	Did not advance			
Avaavau Avaavau	Light Welterweight	Khalid Rahilou (MAR); L RSCO	Did not advance				
Tiui Faamaoni	Bantamweight	Moumouni Siuley (NIG); L RSCH	Did not advance				
Viliamu Lesiva (Note: otherwise Vili Lesiva)	Middleweight		Darko Dukic (YUG); L RSCO	Did not advance			
Asomua Naea	Welterweight		Humberto Aranda (CRC); L RSCH	Did not advance			
Ulaipalota Tauatama	Featherweight	Evance Malenga (MAW); W 5-0	Tomasz Nowak (POL); L WO	Did not advance			
Pua Ulberg	Light Heavyweight		Andrea Magi (ITA); L 0-5	Did not advance			

== Weightlifting ==
Men

Athlete	Event	Snatch		Clean & jerk		Total	Rank
Athlete	Event	Result	Rank	Result	Rank	Total	Rank
Taveuni Ofisa	Lightweight	107.5 kg	19	142.5 kg	16	250 kg	18

== Wrestling ==
=== Men's freestyle ===
Athlete	Event	Preliminary round	Standing	Final
Athlete	Event	Opposition Score	Standing	Opposition Score
Uati Iutaga	74 kg	Adama Damballey (GAM); L 0-4 Pekka Rauhala (FIN); L 0–4	13th in group 26th overall	Did not advance
Fred Solovi	100 kg	Leri Khabelov (URS); L 0-4 Floriano Spiess (BRA); L 1–3	9th in group 17th overall	Did not advance
