= Mohammad N. Faqiri =

Mohammad N. Faqiri may refer to:

- Mohammad Nasim Faqiri (born 1958), a former anti-Soviet fighter, diplomat, senior official in the Jamiat-e-Islami party, and Taliban supporter
- Mohammad Nazar Faqiri (born 1955), a former refugee, refugee camp director, appointed to the Meshrano Jirga in 2005
