= 1987 Asian Wrestling Championships =

1987 Asian Championships
- Host city: Mumbai, India
- Dates: 13–17 October

Champions
- Freestyle: Iran
- Greco-Roman: Japan

The 1987 Asian Wrestling Championships were held in Mumbai, India. The event took place from 13 to 17 October 1987.

== Medal table ==
Rank	Nation	Gold	Silver	Bronze	Total
1	Iran	6	4	5	15
2	Japan	5	5	4	14
3	South Korea	4	2	4	10
4	North Korea	3	1	0	4
5	India	1	7	3	11
6	Iraq	1	0	2	3
7	Pakistan	0	1	1	2
Totals (7 entries)		20	20	19	59

== Team ranking ==
Rank	Men's freestyle		Men's Greco-Roman	
Rank	Team	Points	Team	Points
1	Iran	43	Japan	42
2	Japan	38	Iran	39
3	India	36	India	37
4	North Korea	23	South Korea	33
5	South Korea	22	Iraq	16

== Medal summary ==
=== Men's freestyle ===
Event	Gold	Silver	Bronze
48 kg	Kim Sun-chol; North Korea	Rajesh Kumar; India	Lee Sang-ho; South Korea
52 kg	Bong Hong-il; North Korea	Isao Okiyama; Japan	Yaghoub Najafi; Iran
57 kg	Gwon O-young; North Korea	Muhammad Azeem; Pakistan	Mohammad Zolfaghari; Iran
62 kg	Takumi Adachi; Japan	Ko Young-ho; South Korea	Hamid Ghafourian; Iran
68 kg	Yoshihiko Hara; Japan	Satyawan; India	Kim Soo-hwan; South Korea
74 kg	Ayat Vagozari; Iran	Raj Kumar; India	Yoon Kyung-jae; South Korea
82 kg	Mohammad Hossein Mohebbi; Iran	Atsushi Ito; Japan	Mohammed Abdul-Sattar; Iraq
90 kg	Mohammad Hassan Mohebbi; Iran	Yoshitaka Arimoto; Japan	Abdul Majeed Maruwala; Pakistan
100 kg	Subhash Verma; India	Hong Chol-ho; North Korea	Mehdi Mohebbi; Iran
130 kg	Alireza Soleimani; Iran	Gurmukh Singh; India	Hidenori Nara; Japan

=== Men's Greco-Roman ===
Event	Gold	Silver	Bronze
48 kg	Goun Duk-yong; South Korea	Mohsen Taheri; Iran	Yasuichi Ebina; Japan
52 kg	Ahad Pazaj; Iran	Ashok Kumar; India	Lee Sang-ho; South Korea
57 kg	Isao Kawamoto; Japan	Kim Jin-wan; South Korea	Ghazi Faisal; Iraq
62 kg	Kim Seong-min; South Korea	Taizo Deguchi; Japan	Gian Singh; India
68 kg	Lee Sam-sung; South Korea	Hamid Rahimi; Iran	Yasushi Miyake; Japan
74 kg	Hiromichi Ito; Japan	Mousa Tabatabaei; Iran	Dinesh Kumar; India
82 kg	Kim Sang-kyu; South Korea	Nozomi Kobayashi; Japan	Nasser Khalili; Iran
90 kg	Toru Higashide; Japan	Hassan Babak; Iran	Bhim Singh; India
100 kg	Mohammad Naderi; Iran	Malkhan Singh; India	Masahiko Fukube; Japan
130 kg	Farhan Jassim; Iraq	Ram Asre; India	None awarded
