= Faqiri =

Faqiri (Persian: فقیری; adjective form of Fakir or Faqir (Arabic: فقیر), a Sufi Muslim ascetic) is a Dari surname. Faghiri is the romanization of its Persian equivalent.
Notable people with the surname include:

- Mohammad Nasim Faqiri (born 1958), Afghan politician and diplomat
- Mohammad Nazar Faqiri (born 1955), Afghan politician
