= 1991 Asian Wrestling Championships =

Freestyle
- Host city: New Delhi, India
- Dates: 17–19 April 1991
- Stadium: Indira Gandhi Arena

Greco-Roman
- Host city: Tehran, Iran
- Dates: 16–18 May 1991

Champions
- Freestyle: Iran
- Greco-Roman: South Korea

The following is the final results of the 1991 Asian Wrestling Championships.

== Medal table ==
Rank	Nation	Gold	Silver	Bronze	Total
1	Iran	11	3	1	15
2	South Korea	2	4	6	12
3	North Korea	2	3	2	7
4	China	2	2	3	7
5	Mongolia	2	2	2	6
6	Syria	1	1	0	2
7	Japan	0	2	5	7
8	India	0	2	1	3
9	Pakistan	0	1	0	1
Totals (9 entries)		20	20	20	60

== Team ranking ==
Rank	Men's freestyle		Men's Greco-Roman	
Rank	Team	Points	Team	Points
1	Iran	91	South Korea	47
2	Mongolia	75	Iran	43
3	India	63	Japan	35
4	Japan	54	China	32
5	North Korea	44	Syria	22

== Medal summary ==
=== Men's freestyle ===
Event	Gold	Silver	Bronze
48 kg	Nasser Zeinalnia; Iran	Ombir Singh; India	Ri Hak-son; North Korea
52 kg	Majid Torkan; Iran	Sol Su-chol; North Korea	Tserenbaataryn Enkhbayar; Mongolia
57 kg	Kim Yong-sik; North Korea	Arslangiin Tsedensodnom; Mongolia	Ryo Kanehama; Japan
62 kg	Taghi Akbarnejad; Iran	Kim Yeon-man; South Korea	Kim Song-u; North Korea
68 kg	Ali Akbarnejad; Iran	Ri Won-il; North Korea	Yang Zhigang; China
74 kg	Lodoin Enkhbayar; Mongolia	Amir Reza Khadem; Iran	Tomohiro Tsunozaki; Japan
82 kg	Rasoul Khadem; Iran	Nergüin Tümennast; Mongolia	Yoon Kyung-jae; South Korea
90 kg	Rentsenkhüügiin Gansükh; Mongolia	Qu Zhongdong; China	Ardeshir Bolandeghbal; Iran
100 kg	Mohammad Reza Toupchi; Iran	Abdul Majeed Maruwala; Pakistan	Subhash Verma; India
130 kg	Alireza Soleimani; Iran	Jagdish Singh; India	Boldyn Javkhlantögs; Mongolia

=== Men's Greco-Roman ===
Event	Gold	Silver	Bronze
48 kg	Reza Simkhah; Iran	Han Sang-jik; North Korea	Goun Duk-yong; South Korea
52 kg	Pak Bom-su; North Korea	Shohei Nakamori; Japan	Kim Young-koo; South Korea
57 kg	Nader Al-Sobai; Syria	Kim Jin-wan; South Korea	Sheng Zetian; China
62 kg	Hassan Yousefi Afshar; Iran	Huh Byung-ho; South Korea	Hu Guohong; China
68 kg	Abdollah Chamangoli; Iran	Kim Sung-moon; South Korea	Yasushi Miyake; Japan
74 kg	Han Chee-ho; South Korea	Ahad Javansalehi; Iran	Kunishige Yuasa; Japan
82 kg	Zhang Zetian; China	Nasser Al-Tahan; Syria	Chung Hun-pyo; South Korea
90 kg	Eom Jin-han; South Korea	Jaber Abbaszadeh; Iran	Toru Higashide; Japan
100 kg	Liu Guoke; China	Takashi Nonomura; Japan	Choi Mu-bae; South Korea
130 kg	Alireza Lorestani; Iran	Hu Riga; China	Lee Jae-young; South Korea
