= Iliadis =

Iliadis is a Greek surname. Notable people with the name include:

- Antonis Iliadis (born 1993), Greek professional footballer
- Athanasios Iliadis (born 1952), Greek boxer
- Dennis Iliadis (born 1969), Greek film director
- Dionysios Iliadis (born 1983), Greek judoka
- Ilias Iliadis (footballer) (born 2001), professional footballer
- Ilias Iliadis (judoka) (born 1986), Georgian-Greek judoka
- Konstantinos Iliadis (born 1960), Cypriot wrestler
- Michalis Iliadis (born 1996), Greek professional footballer
- Nikos Iliadis (born 1951), Greek weightlifter
- Savvas Iliadis (born 1979), Greek professional basketball player
- Stefanos Iliadis (born 1994), Cypriot professional basketball player
- Stelios Iliadis (born 1986), Greek footballer
- Theocharis Iliadis (born 1996), Greek professional footballer
- Vassilios Iliadis (born 1981), Greek judoka and sambist

== See also ==
- Ilias Iliadis (disambiguation)
