= Ali Mohammadi =

Ali Mohammadi may refer to:

- Ali Mohammadi, Iran, a village
- Ali Mohammadi (wrestler) (born 1984), Iranian Greco-Roman wrestler
