= Ghelichkhani =

Ghelichkhani (Persian: قلیچ‌خانی) is an Iranian surname. Notable people with the surname include:

- Alireza Ghelichkhani (c. 1937–2018), Iranian wrestler
- Parviz Ghelichkhani (1945–2026), Iranian-French football player
