= Faghiri =

Faghiri (Persian: فقیری; adjective form of Fakir or Faqir (Arabic: فقیر), a Sufi Muslim ascetic) is a Persian surname. Faqiri is the romanization of its Dari equivalent.
Notable people with the surname include:

- Amin Faghiri (born 1943), Iranian researcher and writer
- Mohammad Faghiri (born 1985), Iranian wrestler
