= 1983 Asian Wrestling Championships =

- Host city: Tehran, Iran
- Dates: 8–11 November 1983
- Stadium: Azadi Indoor Stadium

Champions
- Freestyle: Iran
- Greco-Roman: Iran

The 1983 Asian Wrestling Championships were held in Tehran, Iran. The event took place from November 8 to November 11, 1983.

== Medal table ==
Rank	Nation	Gold	Silver	Bronze	Total
1	Iran	16	4	0	20
2	Japan	3	6	3	12
3	India	1	7	10	18
4	Pakistan	0	3	4	7
5	China	0	0	3	3
Totals (5 entries)		20	20	20	60

== Team ranking ==
Rank	Men's freestyle		Men's Greco-Roman	
Rank	Team	Points	Team	Points
1	Iran	58	Iran	58
2	India	40	India	46
3	Japan	39	Japan	24
4	China	21	Pakistan	22
5	Pakistan	17		

== Medal summary ==
=== Men's freestyle ===
Event	Gold	Silver	Bronze
48 kg	Majid Torkan; Iran	Takashi Kobayashi; Japan	Liang Dejin; China
52 kg	Yaghoub Najafi; Iran	Kuldeep Singh; India	Zhang Jianhua; China
57 kg	Askari Mohammadian; Iran	Toshio Asakura; Japan	Guan Bunima; China
62 kg	Kazuhito Sakae; Japan	Mohsen Kaveh; Iran	Ashok Kumar; India
68 kg	Khosro Pishro; Iran	Kokichi Sugino; Japan	Jagmander Singh; India
74 kg	Aziz Vagozari; Iran	Naomi Higuchi; Japan	Naresh Kumar; India
82 kg	Mohammad Hossein Mohebbi; Iran	Jagdish Kumar; India	Ahmed Khalil; Pakistan
90 kg	Mohammad Hassan Mohebbi; Iran	Abdul Majeed Maruwala; Pakistan	Sukhbir Singh; India
100 kg	Tamon Honda; Japan	Hossein Golabi; Iran	Kartar Singh; India
+100 kg	Alireza Soleimani; Iran	Rajinder Singh; India	Hirokazu Okawa; Japan

=== Men's Greco-Roman ===
Event	Gold	Silver	Bronze
48 kg	Morteza Papinia; Iran	Ram Pal; India	Abid Hussain; Pakistan
52 kg	Ali Khani; Iran	Sanaullah; Pakistan	Kuldeep Singh; India
57 kg	Toshio Asakura; Japan	Gholam Mohseni; Iran	Rohtas Singh Dahiya; India
62 kg	Hossein Touranian; Iran	Kazuhito Sakae; Japan	Ashok Kumar; India
68 kg	Mohammad Bana; Iran	Kokichi Sugino; Japan	Jagmander Singh; India
74 kg	Mousa Tabatabaei; Iran	Naresh Kumar; India	Naomi Higuchi; Japan
82 kg	Fereydoun Behnampour; Iran	Jagdish Kumar; India	Muhammad Anwar; Pakistan
90 kg	Hassan Babak; Iran	Abdul Majeed Maruwala; Pakistan	Sukhbir Singh; India
100 kg	Kartar Singh; India	Hesamoddin Jafari; Iran	Khalid Ahmed; Pakistan
+100 kg	Davoud Ayoub; Iran	Rajinder Singh; India	Hirokazu Okawa; Japan

== Participating nations ==
49 competitors from 5 nations competed.

- China (6)
- India (10)
- Iran (20)
- Japan (8)
- Pakistan (5)
