= Barend Labuschagne =

South African wrestler

Personal information
- Nationality: South African
- Born: 13 December 1968 (age 57)

Sport
- Sport: Wrestling

Barend Labuschagne (born 13 December 1968) is a South African wrestler. He competed in the men's freestyle 74 kg at the 1992 Summer Olympics.
