= Lars Gustafsson (wrestler) =

Swedish wrestler

Personal information
- Nationality: Swedish
- Born: 21 April 1966 (age 60) Värnamo, Sweden

Sport
- Sport: Wrestling

Lars Gustafsson (born 21 April 1966) is a Swedish wrestler. He competed in the men's freestyle 74 kg at the 1988 Summer Olympics.
