= Claudiu Tămăduianu =

Romanian wrestler

Personal information
- Nationality: Romanian
- Born: 2 October 1962 (age 63) Roșiorii de Vede, Romania

Sport
- Sport: Wrestling

Claudiu Tămăduianu (born 2 October 1962) is a Romanian wrestler. He competed in the men's freestyle 74 kg at the 1988 Summer Olympics.
