= Wrestling at the 1990 Asian Games =

- Venue: Shijingshan Gymnasium
- Dates: 23 September – 3 October 1990

Wrestling was one of the sports which was held at the 1990 Asian Games in Shijingshan Gymnasium, Beijing, China between 23 September and 3 October 1990. The competition included only men's events.

== Medalists ==
=== Freestyle ===
Event	Gold	Silver	Bronze
48 kg	Kim Jong-shin; South Korea	Ombir Singh; India	Tserenbaataryn Khosbayar; Mongolia
52 kg	Oveis Mallah; Iran	Hideo Sasayama; Japan	Sol Su-chol; North Korea
57 kg	Kim Yong-sik; North Korea	Arslangiin Tsedensodnom; Mongolia	Jalil Jahanshahi; Iran
62 kg	Takumi Adachi; Japan	Kim Il-chol; North Korea	Shin Sang-kyu; South Korea
68 kg	Park Jang-soon; South Korea	Rasoul Khadem; Iran	Yang Zhigang; China
74 kg	Behrouz Yari; Iran	Lodoin Enkhbayar; Mongolia	Park Young-jin; South Korea
82 kg	Puntsagiin Sükhbat; Mongolia	Ayat Vagozari; Iran	Lee Dong-woo; South Korea
90 kg	Oh Hyo-chul; South Korea	Qu Zhongdong; China	Ayoub Baninosrat; Iran
100 kg	Kim Tae-woo; South Korea	Boldyn Javkhlantögs; Mongolia	Subhash Verma; India
130 kg	Reza Soukhtehsaraei; Iran	Aduuchiin Baatarkhüü; Mongolia	Jo Byung-eun; South Korea

=== Greco-Roman ===
Event	Gold	Silver	Bronze
48 kg	Goun Duk-yong; South Korea	Han Sang-jik; North Korea	Reza Simkhah; Iran
52 kg	An Han-bong; South Korea	Hu Richa; China	Pak Bom-su; North Korea
57 kg	Shi Jin-chul; South Korea	Yang Changling; China	Ahad Pazaj; Iran
62 kg	Shigeki Nishiguchi; Japan	Hassan Yousefi Afshar; Iran	Hu Guohong; China
68 kg	Moon Chung-sik; South Korea	Yi Libatu; China	Takumi Mori; Japan
74 kg	Han Chee-ho; South Korea	Hiromichi Ito; Japan	Masoud Ghadimi; Iran
82 kg	Kim Sang-kyu; South Korea	Li Daxin; China	Mohammad Zayar; Syria
90 kg	Eom Jin-han; South Korea	Gu Maosheng; China	Yasutoshi Moriyama; Japan
100 kg	Bao Yu; China	Mohammad Naderi; Iran	Ahmad Al-Shami; Syria
130 kg	Hu Riga; China	Alireza Lorestani; Iran	Hidenori Nara; Japan

== Medal table ==
Rank	Nation	Gold	Silver	Bronze	Total
1	South Korea (KOR)	11	0	4	15
2	Iran (IRN)	3	5	5	13
3	China (CHN)	2	6	2	10
4	Japan (JPN)	2	2	3	7
5	Mongolia (MGL)	1	4	1	6
6	North Korea (PRK)	1	2	2	5
7	India (IND)	0	1	1	2
8	Syria (SYR)	0	0	2	2
Totals (8 entries)		20	20	20	60
