= Bruno Beudet =

French wrestler

Personal information
- Nationality: French
- Born: 26 September 1964 (age 61) Auxonne, France

Sport
- Sport: Wrestling

Bruno Beudet (born 26 September 1964) is a French wrestler. He competed in the men's freestyle 74 kg at the 1988 Summer Olympics.
