= Kazuhito Sakae =

Japanese sport wrestler (born 1960)

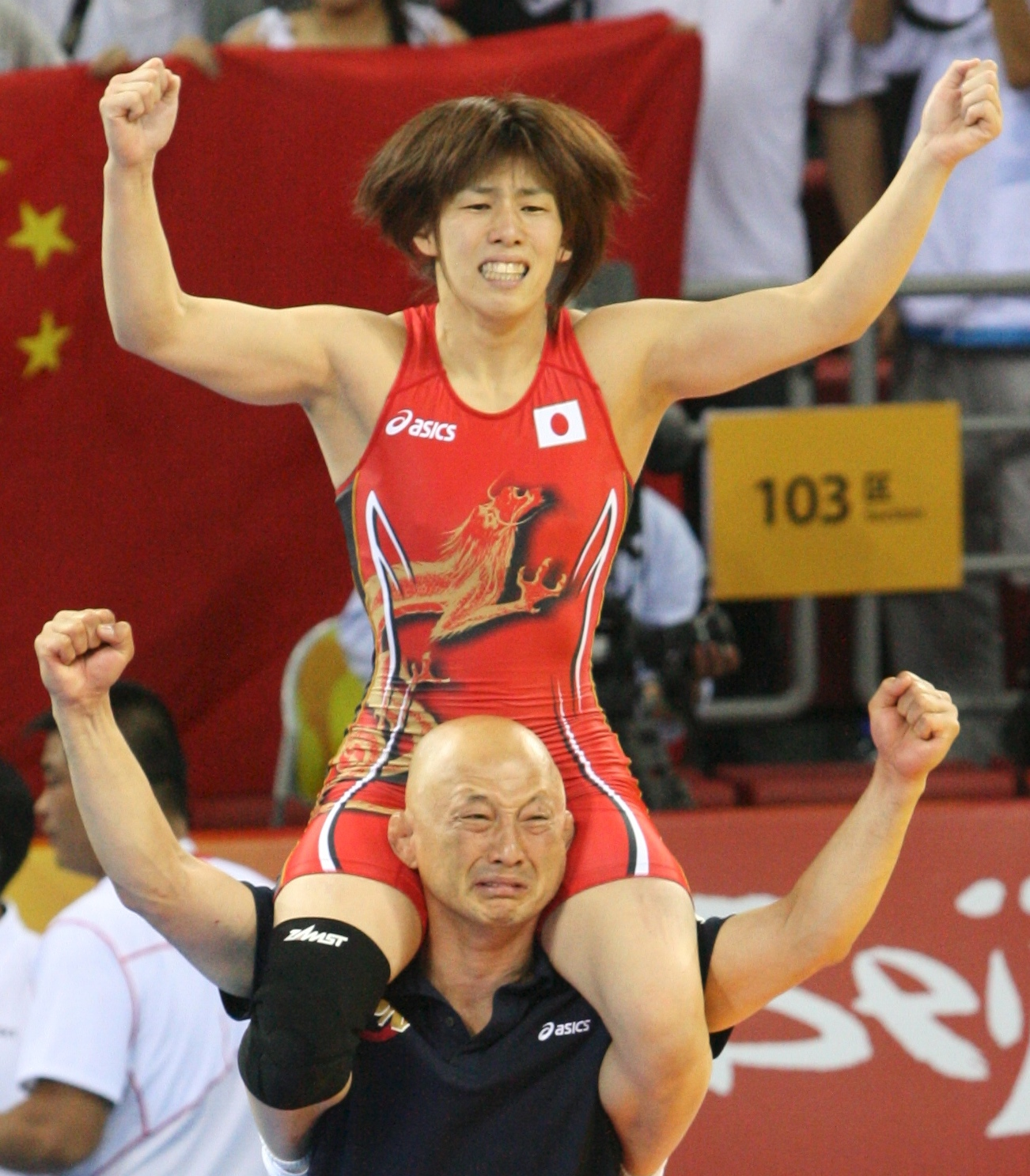
- Kazuhito Sakae with Saori Yoshida at the 2008 Olympics

Personal information
- Born: June 19, 1960 (age 66) Amami City, Kagoshima prefecture, Japan
- Height: 1.66 m (5 ft 5 in)
- Weight: 62 kg (137 lb)

Sport
- Sport: Wrestling
Medal record
Representing Japan
Freestyle wrestling
World Championships
Bronze medal – third place	1987 Clermont-Ferrand	62 kg
Asian Games
Silver medal – second place	1986 Seoul	62 kg
Asian Wrestling Championships
Gold medal – first place	1983 Tehran	62 kg
Gold medal – first place	1989 Oarai	62 kg
Greco-Roman wrestling
Asian Wrestling Championships
Silver medal – second place	1983 Tehran	62 kg

Kazuhito Sakae (栄 和人, Sakae Kazuhito; born June 19, 1960) is a Japanese wrestling coach and retired wrestler who won several medals in the 62 kg category at the Asian and world level between 1983 and 1989. Kazuhito has trained Saori Yoshida, Kaori Icho, Hitomi Obara, Chiharu Icho, Kyoko Hamaguchi and Eri Tosaka, among others.

== Biography ==
At the 1983 Asian Wrestling Championships, he won a gold medal in the freestyle wrestling and a silver in the Greco-Roman wrestling.

After retiring from competitions he worked as a national coach, Around late 1980s,:Chukyo Women’s University, near Nagoya (later renamed Shigakkan University), launched its wrestling program. Several years afterward, the university appointed Kazuhito as head coach, who actively recruited the country’s strongest female wrestlers for the university team and its affiliated high school. He developed a coaching approach tailored to female athletes, modifying selected freestyle techniques to suit Female physique of lower center of gravity and greater upper-body flexibility, and prioritizing all-female sparring and drills on the grounds that women respond differently to wrestling scenarios than men.

Japan's women's freestyle wrestling team, coached by Kazuhito successfully repeated their medal performance from the 2004 Athens Olympics at the 2008 Beijing Games. Under Sakae's guidance, the Japanese quartet earned two gold medals, one silver, and one bronze — the same result as in Athens — bringing their combined total of Olympic and world championship gold medals to 22. Following the competition, Kazuhito noted that it was time to introduce new talent to the team.

During the 2016 Rio de Janeiro. Olympics, Kazuhito's team of women’s freestyle wrestling which includes Risako Kinjo and Eri Tosaka, has brought four gold medals.

On December 19, 2019, he returned as head coach of the wrestling team at Shigakukan University. On December 17, 2022 , he assumed the position of president of the Obu City Wrestling Association.

He was married to Ryoko Sakamoto, the 1992 Women's World Championships 57 kg class gold medalist, and a bodybuilder. His daughter, Kiwa Sakae, is also a wrestler. In 2008, Kazuhito married with Rena Iwata, another wrestler and also one of Kazuhito's former student.

In February 2026, it was announced that Kazuhito Sakae would participate in exchange events at three senior care facilities operated by Couleur (Kruur) in Aichi Prefecture on March 7, 2026. The events include talks and stretching sessions with residents, their families, and staff. This follows his retirement as Shigakkan University wrestling coach in March 2025 and his appointment as head coach of the Mongolian national wrestling team in August 2025, where he will prepare the team for the 2028 Los Angeles Olympics.
