= Ioakeim Vasiliadis =

Greek wrestler

Personal information
- Nationality: Greek
- Born: 24 January 1965 (age 61) Soviet Union

Sport
- Sport: Wrestling

Ioakeim Vasiliadis (born 24 January 1965) is a Greek wrestler. He competed in the men's freestyle 74 kg at the 1992 Summer Olympics.
