= Monday Eguabor =

Nigerian wrestler

Personal information
- Nationality: Nigerian
- Born: 10 August 1968 (age 57)

Sport
- Sport: Wrestling

Monday Eguabor (born 10 August 1968) is a Nigerian wrestler. He competed in the men's freestyle 74 kg at the 1988 Summer Olympics.
