= Krzysztof Walencik =

Polish wrestler

Personal information
- Nationality: Polish
- Born: 26 February 1965 (age 61) Sochaczew, Poland

Sport
- Sport: Wrestling

Krzysztof Walencik (born 26 February 1965) is a Polish wrestler. He competed in the men's freestyle 74 kg at the 1992 Summer Olympics where he placed 5th.

== Sports career ==
Participant of the world championships in:

- Martigny (1989) – 5th place,
- Tokyo (1990) – 9th place,
- Varna (1991) – 14th place
- Istanbul (1994) – 11th place,
- Atlanta (1995) – 21st place.

Participant of the European championships in:

- Manchester (1988) – 8th place,
- Ankara (1989) – 4th place,
- Poznań (1990) – 6th place,
- Istanbul (1993) – 10th place,
- Rome (1994) – 6th place,
- Freiburg (1995) – 12th place,
- Budapest (1996) – 9th place,
