= David Harmon (wrestler) =

Irish wrestler

Personal information
- Nationality: Irish
- Born: 10 February 1967 (age 59)

Sport
- Sport: Wrestling

David Harmon (born 10 February 1967) is an Irish wrestler. He competed in the men's freestyle 74 kg at the 1988 Summer Olympics.
