= Selahattin Yiğit =

Turkish wrestler

Personal information
- Nationality: Turkish
- Born: 1 January 1968 (age 58)

Sport
- Sport: Wrestling

Selahattin Yiğit (born 1 January 1968) is a Turkish wrestler. He competed in the men's freestyle 74 kg at the 1992 Summer Olympics.
