= Abdullah Al-Ghrbi =

Yemeni wrestler (born 1965)

Abdullah Al-Ghrbi (born 11 July 1965) is a former wrestler, who represented North Yemen at the 1988 Summer Olympics in the men's freestyle 74kg class. He lost his first two bouts and was eliminated.
