= Eusebio Serna =

Spanish wrestler

Personal information
- Nationality: Spanish
- Born: 13 June 1961 (age 65)

Sport
- Sport: Wrestling

Eusebio Serna (born 13 June 1961) is a Spanish wrestler. He competed in the men's freestyle 74 kg at the 1988 Summer Olympics.
