= Haitham Jibara =

Iraqi wrestler

Personal information
- Nationality: Iraqi
- Born: 1964 (age 61–62)

Sport
- Sport: Wrestling

Haitham Jibara (born 1964) is an Iraqi wrestler. He competed in the men's freestyle 74 kg at the 1988 Summer Olympics.
