= Alfonso Jessel =

Mexican wrestler

Personal information
- Nationality: Mexican
- Born: 16 May 1958 (age 68)

Sport
- Sport: Wrestling

Alfonso Jessel (born 16 May 1958) is a Mexican wrestler. He competed in the men's freestyle 74 kg at the 1988 Summer Olympics.
