= Milan Revický =

Slovak wrestler

Personal information
- Nationality: Slovak
- Born: 20 May 1965 (age 61) Bojnice, Czechoslovakia

Sport
- Sport: Wrestling

Milan Revický (born 20 May 1965) is a Slovak wrestler. He competed in the men's freestyle 74 kg at the 1992 Summer Olympics.
