= Rahmat Sofiadi =

Bulgarian wrestler

Rahmat Sukra Sofiadi
Personal information
- Born: 15 November 1965 (age 60) Sofia, Bulgaria
Medal record
Men's freestyle wrestling
Representing Bulgaria
Olympic Games
Bronze medal – third place	1988 Seoul	74 kg

Rahmat Sukra Sofiadi (born 15 November 1965) is a Bulgarian former wrestler who competed in the 1988 Summer Olympics and in the 1992 Summer Olympics. Sofiadi's mother is Bulgarian while his father is Indonesian.
