= Mamadou Diaw Diallo =

Guinean wrestler

Personal information
- Nationality: Guinean
- Born: 1969 (age 56–57)

Sport
- Sport: Wrestling

Mamadou Diaw Diallo (born 1969) is a Guinean wrestler. He competed in the men's freestyle 74 kg at the 1988 Summer Olympics.
