= Adlan Varaev =

Russian Olympic wrestler (1962–2016)

Adlan Varaev Адлан Вараев

Personal information
- Full name: Adlan Abuevich Varaev
- Nationality: Russian
- Born: 2 January 1962 Sadovoe, Groznensky District, Chechen-Ingush ASSR, Russian SFSR, USSR
- Died: 4 May 2016 (aged 54)
- Height: 170 cm (5 ft 7 in)
- Weight: 74 kg (163 lb)

Sport
- Country: Chechen-Ingush ASSR, Soviet Union (now Chechnya, Russia)
- Sport: Freestyle wrestling
- Club: Soviet Army, Grozny
- Coached by: Degi Bagaev, Aslanbek Dzgoev
Medal record
Representing the Soviet Union
Olympic Games
Silver medal – second place	1988 Seoul	74 kg
World Championships
Gold medal – first place	1987 Clermont-Ferrand	74 kg
Silver medal – second place	1986 Budapest	74 kg
European Championships
Gold medal – first place	1986 Piraeus	74 kg
Gold medal – first place	1987 Veliko Tarnovo	74 kg
Gold medal – first place	1988 Manchester	74 kg

Adlan Abuevich Varaev (Russian: Адлан Абуевич Вараев; 2 January 1962 – 4 May 2016) was a Russian-Chechen welterweight freestyle wrestler who won a silver medal at the 1988 Olympics. He won the 1987 World Championships, beating Dave Schultz in the final, and placed second in 1986. Varaev held the European welterweight title in 1986–1988. After retiring from competitions worked as a wrestling coach and administrator. He trained the Russian national freestyle team and served as vice-president of the Russian Wrestling Federation. He drowned after a bad fall into the Argun River.
