= Uwe Westendorf =

German wrestler

Personal information
- Nationality: East German
- Born: 1 April 1966 (age 60) Kleinmachnow, East Germany

Sport
- Sport: Wrestling

Uwe Westendorf (born 1 April 1966) is a German former wrestler. He competed in the men's freestyle 74 kg at the 1988 Summer Olympics representing East Germany.
