= Djibril Diouf =

Senegalese wrestler (born 1957)

Personal information
- Nationality: Senegalese
- Born: 8 March 1957 (age 69)

Sport
- Sport: Wrestling

Djibril Diouf (born 8 March 1957) is a Senegalese wrestler. He competed in the men's freestyle 74 kg at the 1988 Summer Olympics.
