= Valentin Zhelev =

Bulgarian wrestler

Personal information
- Nationality: Bulgarian
- Born: 18 September 1968 (age 57) Yambol, Bulgaria

Sport
- Sport: Wrestling

Valentin Zhelev (born 18 September 1968) is a Bulgarian wrestler. He competed in the men's freestyle 74 kg at the 1992 Summer Olympics.
