= Ali Mohammadi, Iran =

Ali Mohammadi علي محمدي
- Village
- Location within Iran
- Coordinates: 28°47′33″N 51°13′30″E
- Country: Iran
- Province: Bushehr
- County: Tangestan
- Bakhsh: Central
- Rural District: Baghak

Population (2006)
  - Total: 49
- Time zone: UTC+3:30 (IRST)
  - Summer (DST): UTC+4:30 (IRDT)

Ali Mohammadi (Persian: علي محمدي, also Romanized as ʿAlī Moḩammadī; also known as Alīmoḩammadī) is a village in Baghak Rural District, in the Central District of Tangestan County, Bushehr Province, Iran. At the 2006 census, its population was 49, in 12 families.
