= 2007 Asian Wrestling Championships =

Wrestling championship

- Host city: Bishkek, Kyrgyzstan
- Dates: 8–13 May 2007
- Stadium: Kojomkul Sports Palace

Champions
- Freestyle: Iran
- Greco-Roman: Iran
- Women: China

The 2007 Asian Wrestling Championships were held in Bishkek, Kyrgyzstan. The event took place from May 8 to May 13, 2007.

== Medal table ==
Rank	Nation	Gold	Silver	Bronze	Total
1	Iran	6	4	4	14
2	China	5	1	9	15
3	Kyrgyzstan	4	0	4	8
4	Japan	3	2	2	7
5	Kazakhstan	1	7	4	12
6	South Korea	1	2	8	11
7	Mongolia	1	2	4	7
8	India	0	1	1	2
8	North Korea	0	1	1	2
10	Thailand	0	1	0	1
11	Uzbekistan	0	0	2	2
12	Chinese Taipei	0	0	1	1
12	Jordan	0	0	1	1
12	Tajikistan	0	0	1	1
Totals (14 entries)		21	21	42	84

== Team ranking ==
Rank	Men's freestyle		Men's Greco-Roman		Women's freestyle	
Rank	Team	Points	Team	Points	Team	Points
1	Iran	64	Iran	64	China	63
2	Kazakhstan	45	Kyrgyzstan	56	Kazakhstan	53
3	Mongolia	40	China	48	Japan	48
4	South Korea	40	South Korea	47	South Korea	48
5	Japan	39	Kazakhstan	43	Mongolia	44
6	China	34	Uzbekistan	35	Kyrgyzstan	38
7	Kyrgyzstan	32	Japan	30	Thailand	22
8	India	30	North Korea	14	Chinese Taipei	21
9	Uzbekistan	20	Iraq	14	Uzbekistan	21
10	North Korea	17	Syria	10	India	16

== Medal summary ==
=== Men's freestyle ===
Event	Gold	Silver	Bronze
55 kg	Masashi Saito; Japan	Asset Serikbayev; Kazakhstan	Abbas Dabbaghi; Iran
55 kg	Masashi Saito; Japan	Asset Serikbayev; Kazakhstan	Enkhsaikhany Nyam-Ochir; Mongolia
60 kg	Bazar Bazarguruev; Kyrgyzstan	Shinya Odate; Japan	Ri Yong-chol; North Korea
60 kg	Bazar Bazarguruev; Kyrgyzstan	Shinya Odate; Japan	Mehdi Taghavi; Iran
66 kg	Hassan Tahmasebi; Iran	Sushil Kumar; India	Jung Young-ho; South Korea
66 kg	Hassan Tahmasebi; Iran	Sushil Kumar; India	Naidanpüreviin Bayarkhüü; Mongolia
74 kg	Wu Zijian; China	Meisam Mostafa-Jokar; Iran	Lee Sang-kyu; South Korea
74 kg	Wu Zijian; China	Meisam Mostafa-Jokar; Iran	Seifaddin Osmanov; Kazakhstan
84 kg	Mehdi Mansouri; Iran	Chagnaadorjiin Ganzorig; Mongolia	Yermek Baiduashov; Kazakhstan
84 kg	Mehdi Mansouri; Iran	Chagnaadorjiin Ganzorig; Mongolia	Abdul Ammaev; Uzbekistan
96 kg	Aleksey Krupnyakov; Kyrgyzstan	Amir Abbas Moradi Ganji; Iran	Nurzhan Katayev; Kazakhstan
96 kg	Aleksey Krupnyakov; Kyrgyzstan	Amir Abbas Moradi Ganji; Iran	Yang Wulin; China
120 kg	Fardin Masoumi; Iran	Marid Mutalimov; Kazakhstan	Palwinder Singh Cheema; India
120 kg	Fardin Masoumi; Iran	Marid Mutalimov; Kazakhstan	Zhao Haiyu; China

=== Men's Greco-Roman ===
Event	Gold	Silver	Bronze
55 kg	Hamid Sourian; Iran	Cha Kwang-su; North Korea	Ildar Hafizov; Uzbekistan
55 kg	Hamid Sourian; Iran	Cha Kwang-su; North Korea	Lee Jung-baik; South Korea
60 kg	Moon Ho-seon; South Korea	Hamid Bavafa; Iran	Ruslan Tyumenbayev; Kyrgyzstan
60 kg	Moon Ho-seon; South Korea	Hamid Bavafa; Iran	Sheng Jiang; China
66 kg	Kanatbek Begaliev; Kyrgyzstan	Jung Ji-hyun; South Korea	Ali Mohammadi; Iran
66 kg	Kanatbek Begaliev; Kyrgyzstan	Jung Ji-hyun; South Korea	Qiao Huameng; China
74 kg	Daniar Kobonov; Kyrgyzstan	Asset Adilov; Kazakhstan	Chang Yongxiang; China
74 kg	Daniar Kobonov; Kyrgyzstan	Asset Adilov; Kazakhstan	Mojtaba Babajanzadeh; Iran
84 kg	Saman Tahmasebi; Iran	Cho Hyo-chul; South Korea	Janarbek Kenjeev; Kyrgyzstan
84 kg	Saman Tahmasebi; Iran	Cho Hyo-chul; South Korea	Yahia Abutabeekh; Jordan
96 kg	Ghasem Rezaei; Iran	Asset Mambetov; Kazakhstan	Lee Eol; South Korea
96 kg	Ghasem Rezaei; Iran	Asset Mambetov; Kazakhstan	Chen Xiaofei; China
120 kg	Liu Deli; China	Mehdi Sharabiani; Iran	Murodjon Tuychiev; Tajikistan
120 kg	Liu Deli; China	Mehdi Sharabiani; Iran	Nurbek Ibragimov; Kyrgyzstan

=== Women's freestyle ===
Event	Gold	Silver	Bronze
48 kg	Tsogtbazaryn Enkhjargal; Mongolia	Sunisa Klahan; Thailand	Li Xiaomei; China
48 kg	Tsogtbazaryn Enkhjargal; Mongolia	Sunisa Klahan; Thailand	Jang Ho-soon; South Korea
51 kg	Zhuldyz Eshimova; Kazakhstan	Mizuho Shibata; Japan	Liao Rong; China
51 kg	Zhuldyz Eshimova; Kazakhstan	Mizuho Shibata; Japan	Park Yeon-jin; South Korea
55 kg	Saori Yoshida; Japan	Su Lihui; China	Su Ying-tzu; Chinese Taipei
55 kg	Saori Yoshida; Japan	Su Lihui; China	Olga Smirnova; Kazakhstan
59 kg	Yang Senlian; China	Dorjiin Narmandakh; Mongolia	Lee So-lae; South Korea
59 kg	Yang Senlian; China	Dorjiin Narmandakh; Mongolia	Kei Yamana; Japan
63 kg	Xu Haiyan; China	Yelena Shalygina; Kazakhstan	Hang Jin-young; South Korea
63 kg	Xu Haiyan; China	Yelena Shalygina; Kazakhstan	Badrakhyn Odonchimeg; Mongolia
67 kg	Chen Meng; China	Darya Karpenko; Kazakhstan	Tsedendorjiin Bayarzayaa; Mongolia
67 kg	Chen Meng; China	Darya Karpenko; Kazakhstan	Mami Shinkai; Japan
72 kg	Kyoko Hamaguchi; Japan	Olga Zhanibekova; Kazakhstan	Wang Xu; China
72 kg	Kyoko Hamaguchi; Japan	Olga Zhanibekova; Kazakhstan	Yana Panova; Kyrgyzstan

== Participating nations ==
207 competitors from 19 nations competed.

- China (21)
- Chinese Taipei (4)
- India (14)
- Iran (14)
- Iraq (4)
- Japan (21)
- Jordan (2)
- Kazakhstan (20)
- Kyrgyzstan (21)
- Mongolia (13)
- North Korea (6)
- Pakistan (2)
- Qatar (4)
- South Korea (20)
- Syria (6)
- Tajikistan (4)
- Thailand (8)
- Turkmenistan (4)
- Uzbekistan (19)
