= Konstantinos Iliadis =

Cypriot wrestler (born 1960)

Personal information
- Nationality: Cypriot
- Born: 14 May 1960 (age 66)

Sport
- Sport: Wrestling

Konstantinos Iliadis (born 14 May 1960) is a Cypriot wrestler. He competed in the men's freestyle 74 kg at the 1992 Summer Olympics.
