= Naresh Kumar (wrestler) =

Indian wrestler

Personal information
- Nationality: Indian
- Born: 17 November 1965 (age 60)

Sport
- Sport: Wrestling

Naresh Kumar (born 17 November 1965) is an Indian wrestler. He competed in the men's freestyle 74 kg at the 1988 Summer Olympics.
