= Magomedsalam Gadzhiev =

Azerbaijani wrestler

Personal information
- Nationality: Azerbaijani
- Born: 8 July 1972 (age 52)

Sport
- Sport: Wrestling

Magomedsalam Gadzhiev (born 8 July 1972) is an Azerbaijani wrestler. He competed at the 1992 Summer Olympics and the 1996 Summer Olympics.
