= Uati Iutana =

Samoan wrestler

Personal information
- Nationality: Samoan
- Born: 31 August 1969 (age 56)

Sport
- Sport: Wrestling

Uati Iutana (born 31 August 1969) is a Samoan former wrestler. He competed in the men's freestyle 74 kg at the 1988 Summer Olympics. He is the older brother of fellow Olympian Fa'afetai Iutana, who competed in wrestling at the 2000 Summer Olympics at the Oceania Wrestling Championships.
