= Jean Manga =

Cameroonian wrestler

Personal information
- Nationality: Cameroonian
- Born: 2 September 1959 (age 65)

Sport
- Sport: Wrestling

Jean Manga (born 2 September 1959) is a Cameroonian wrestler. He competed in two events at the 1988 Summer Olympics.
