= Mohammad Bana =

Iranian wrestler and coach

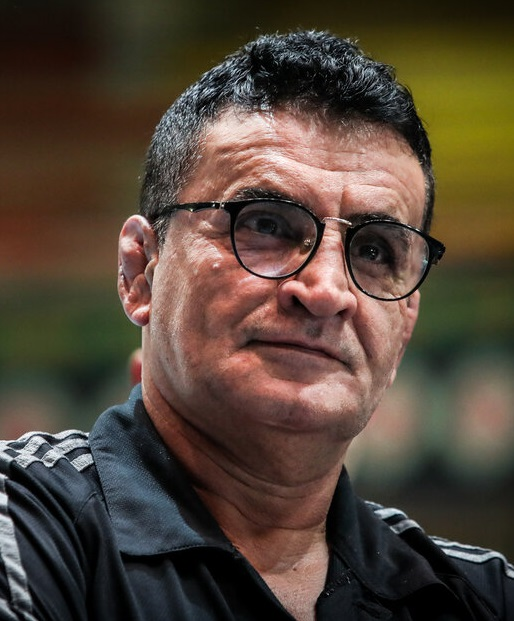

Personal information
- Nationality: Iranian
- Born: August 6, 1958 (age 68) Tehran, Iran
- Spouses: Maria de los Angeles Perez Diaz; Zohreh Forozan
- Children: 2
- Awards: Order of Courage (1st class)
Medal record
Representing Iran
Men's Greco-Roman wrestling
World Championships
Silver medal – second place	1983 Kiev	68 kg
Asian Championships
Gold medal – first place	1983 Tehran	68 kg

Mohammad Bana (Persian: محمد بنا, born 6 August 1958 in Tehran) is an Iranian Greco-Roman wrestling coach and former wrestler, head coach of the Azerbaijan National Greco-Roman wrestling team.

He was the head coach of Iran national Greco-Roman wrestling team at London Olympics 2012 with was accompanied by three gold medals, and is regarded as the most successful coach in Iran's Greco-Roman wrestling history. The Iranian wrestlers won three gold medals in the London 2012 Olympic Games by (Omid Norouzi, Ghasem Rezaei and Hamid Sourian). He is also vice world champion in 1983 in Kiev, As well as the Asian champions at the 1983 tournament in Tehran. Iranian team led Bana at 2010 Asian Games won 8 Gold medals. After the particularly poor performance of his team at Rio Olympics 2016 and the surprising elimination of Iranian wrestlers (including Hamid Sourian) one after another, he said he felt "ashamed" toward them and was seen sitting and crying outside the wrestling stadium, the video and photos of which went viral in social media. He was later quoted as saying he cried because he failed to make the people happy, and that the team is like "his child". Iranian football coach Ali Parvin and Ali Daei said he also burst into tears after watching Bana's cry, and praised him. Asr Iran published a commentary on the photos.

== Career ==
- Iran national wrestling team Coach (2005-2007)
- Iran national wrestling team Coach (2009-2012)
- Iran national wrestling team Coach (2014-2015)
- Iran national wrestling team Coach (2018-2022)
- Azerbaijan national wrestling team Coach (2025-)

=== Awards ===
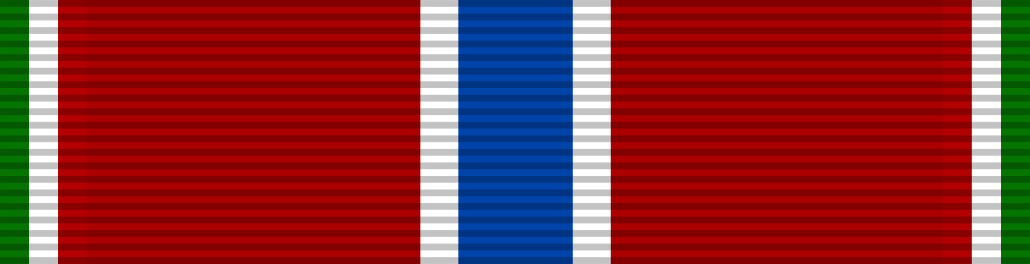
- 2012: Order of Courage (1st Class) awarded by former President of Iran, Mahmoud Ahmadinejad.
- 2012: Best Sports coach by ISNA
- 2011: Best Coach of the year by United World Wrestling
