= Ho Bisgaltu =

Chinese wrestler

Personal information
- Nationality: Chinese
- Born: 21 March 1968 (age 57)

Sport
- Sport: Wrestling

Ho Bisgaltu (浩 華斯哈拉圖, Pinyin: Hào Huá-sī-hā-lā-tú; born 21 March 1968) is a Chinese wrestler. He competed at the 1988 Summer Olympics and the 1992 Summer Olympics.
