= Ilias Iliadis =

Ilias Iliadis may refer to:

- Ilias Iliadis (judoka), Georgian-born Greek judoka
- Ilias Iliadis (footballer), Canadian-Greek footballer
