= Pekka Rauhala =

Finnish wrestler (born 1960)

Personal information
- Nationality: Finnish
- Born: 25 April 1960 (age 64); Muurame, Finland

Sport
- Sport: Wrestling

Pekka Rauhala (born 25 April 1960) is a Finnish wrestler. He competed at the 1980, 1984, 1988 and the 1992 Summer Olympics.
