= Mohammad Nasim Faqiri =

Afghan politician and diplomat

Mohammad Nasim Faqiri محمد نسیم فقیری
- Born: 1958 (age 67–68); Tigary, Laghman Province, Afghanistan
- Occupations: Politician, diplomat, secretary General
- Predecessor: Ustad Shadab
- Political party: Jamiat-e Islami

Mohammad Nasim Faqiri (محمد نسیم فقیری; born 1958) is an Afghan politician and diplomat. He has served as a longtime spokesman for Jamiat-e Islami in Afghanistan, and was appointed Secretary General of the party.

In May 2005, prior to Afghanistan's first post-Taliban elections for its national legislature, the Wolesi Jirga and Provincial Councils, the Pak Tribune, quoted Faqiri discussing his party forming alliances with other parties with a mujahideen background, including the Daawat-i-Islami. In August 2005, the Pak Tribune quoted Faqiri responding to allegations that some members of his party had committed war crimes.

He has also worked as a diplomat in Australia.

In June 2010, a special Loya Jirga to seek the opinions of Afghanistan's elders was convened on the best way to bring peace. Faqiri was one of representatives from Lagham Province. He spoke in favor of a reconciliation with the Taliban.

== Early life ==
Faqiri, an ethnic Pashtun, was born to Faqir Mohammad Khan in Laghman Province during the rule of King Mohammed Zahir Shah. As an adolescent and young adult, he worked for the Nahzat-e Islami, a young Afghans movement.

== Studies ==
In Afghanistan, he earned a degree in Persian Literature from the University of Kabul, an M.A. in Political Science from Peshawar University, and a PhD in Persian Literature from Ferdawsi University in Iran. He speaks fluent Pashto, Dari, English, and Urdu.

The ACKU Library Catalog lists three papers in Dari written by an individual named Mohammad Nasim Faqiri. According to the catalog, two of those papers are associated with two different "corporate bodies". The 1983 paper is associated with the Itehad-e-Islami Mujahideen Afghanistan. The 1988 paper is associated with the Jamiat-i-Islami Afghanistan.

Date	Title	Pages
1983	Revolution in revolution	82 pages
1987	Politics and political orders	80 pages
1988	Some research on: Jehadic poems of Ustad Kahlilullah Khalili on the occasion of the first anniversary of his death	38 pages
