= Yoon Kyung-jae =

South Korean wrestler

Personal information
- Nationality: South Korean
- Born: 8 October 1962 (age 63)

Sport
- Sport: Wrestling

Yoon Kyung-jae (born 8 October 1962) is a South Korean wrestler. He competed in the men's freestyle 74 kg at the 1988 Summer Olympics.
