= Mohammad Nazar Faqiri =

Afghan legislator and tribal elder from Baghlan

- Born: 1955 (age 70–71); Faqi in Pol-e Khomri, Baghlan Province
- Occupations: Politician, administrator
- Office: Meshrano Jirga

Haji Mohammad Nazar Faqiri (born 1955), or Nazar Muhammad Faqiri, was appointed to serve in the Meshrano Jirga, the upper house of Afghanistan`s national legislature, in 2005. He sits in the Meshrano Jirga as a direct appointment by Afghan President Hamid Karzai. Faqiri is from Baghlan Province, and is considered a tribal elder there.

He was born in 1955 in the village of Faqi in Pul-e-Khumri, Baghlan Province. and is a member of Afghanistan`s Tajik ethnic group. Faqiri completed high school prior to leaving Afghanistan as a war-time refugee in 1980. He went to live in Pakistan as a refugee in 1980, eventually serving as a director of two refugee camps.

An individual named Nazar Muhammad Faqiri was a candidate for the Wolesi Jirga in 2010, but failed to win a seat. Nevertheless the office of the Attorney General investigated whether he was involved in election irregularities.
