= Muhammad Anwar (wrestler) =

Pakistani wrestler (born 1959)

Personal information
- Nationality: Pakistani
- Born: 13 April 1959 (age 67)

Sport
- Sport: Wrestling

Muhammad Anwar (born 13 April 1959) is a Pakistani wrestler. He competed in the men's freestyle 74 kg at the 1988 Summer Olympics.
