= Ghasem Rezaei =

Iranian wrestler (born 1985)

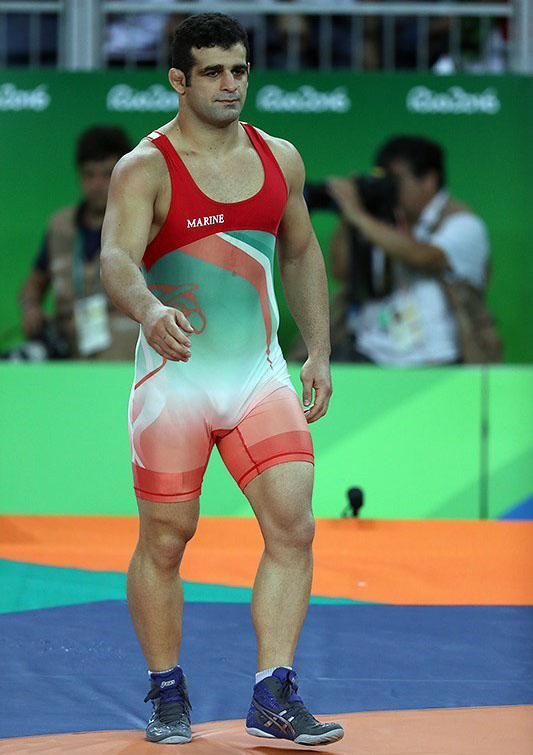
- Rezaei at the 2016 Summer Olympics

Personal information
- Full name: Ghasem Rezaei
- Nickname: Tiger of Amol
- Born: 18 August 1985 (age 40) Amol, Iran
- Education: Master's degree of Physical Education
- Height: 1.83 m (6 ft 0 in)
- Weight: 98 kg (216 lb)
- Website: www.instagram.com/ghasem.rezaei

Sport
- Country: Iran
- Sport: Greco-Roman wrestling
- Club: Takhti Amol; Melli Haffari
- Coached by: Saeed Shirzad; Hassan Yousefi Afshar; Bakhtiar Taghavinia
Medal record
Representing Iran
Men's Greco-Roman wrestling
Event	1st	2nd	3rd
Olympic Games	1	0	1
World Championships	0	1	2
World Cup	1	1	0
World Junior Championships	0	1	0
Other	6	0	1
Total	8	3	4
Men's Greco-Roman wrestling
Olympic Games
Gold medal – first place	2012 London	96 kg
Bronze medal – third place	2016 Rio de Janeiro	98 kg
World Championships
Silver medal – second place	2015 Las Vegas	98 kg
Bronze medal – third place	2007 Baku	96 kg
Bronze medal – third place	2014 Tashkent	98 kg
World Cup
Gold medal – first place	2016 Shiraz	98 kg
Silver medal – second place	2007 Antalya	97 kg
Asian Championships
Gold medal – first place	2007 Bishkek	96 kg
Gold medal – first place	2008 Jeju City	96 kg
Bronze medal – third place	2006 Almaty	84 kg
Grand Prix
Gold medal – first place	2008 Mariupol	96 kg
Gold medal – first place	2011 London	96 kg
Gold medal – first place	2015 Warsaw	98 kg
World Youth Championship
Silver medal – second place	2005 Vilnius	84 kg
Asian Youth Championship
Gold medal – first place	2004 Almaty	84 kg

Ghasem Rezaei (Persian: قاسم رضايى; born 18 August 1985) is an Iranian former Greco-Roman wrestler. He was an Olympic gold and bronze medalist and two-time Asian Champion. His nickname is Tiger of Amol.

== Career ==
Rezaei first success at the international level was 2007 when he won bronze in the 2007 World Wrestling Championships. However, his run at the top of the wrestling world was short-lived. Though he represented Iran in the 2008 Olympics, he suffered early defeat in the first round. Rezaei two success won the gold medal at the 2007 Asian Wrestling Championships and 2008 Asian Wrestling Championships. In 2009, Rezaei found himself unable to compete due to injury.

At the 2011 Greco-Roman World Championship, Rezaei was scheduled to face Israeli Robert Avanesyan in the first round. Rather than face the Israeli, Rezaei failed to appear and thus lost the match by forfeit to the Israeli, was eliminated from the tournament, and gave the Israeli free passage into the Round of 16.

In the years leading up to the 2012 games, Rezaei was unable to recapture his status as Iran's top Greco-Roman wrestler at 96 kilograms. In 2012 Rezaei won the Olympic berth for his country. Rezaei in final defeated Rustam Totrov 2–0, 1–0 in the final at the Excel Center in London on Tuesday. Rezaei beat Turkey Cenk Ildem in his first match, before he beat Artur Aleksanyan 2–0, 1–0 in the quarter-finals. Rezaei defeated Yunior Estrada also 2–0, 1–0 in the semi-finals. He won the gold medal in the men's 96 kg Greco-Roman at the 2012 London Olympics in London. Ghasem Rezaei captured gold medal at 2015 International Greco-Roman wrestling tournament, Pytlasinski in Poland. Rezaei in 2015 World Championship won a silver medal at the Greco-Roman 2015. He with Elis Guri 3–0 in the semi-finals, and qualified for the final bout, where he conceded a 3–0 defeat to Artur Aleksanyan and won the silver. Rezaei ended up in Bronze in Greco-Roman wrestling competitions in the men's 96 kg Greco-Roman at the 2016 Summer Olympics in Rio. Rezaei in his last Olympic game stood in front of Carl Fredrik Schön. Schön went up 4–0 after a takedown and gut wrench in the first period. The Iranian in the second period scored with back-to-back gut wrenches to make the score 4–4 and ultimately give him the victory on criteria.

== See also ==
- Boycotts of Israel in individual sports
