= Ahad Javansalehi =

Iranian wrestler (born 1965)

Personal information
- Nationality: Iranian
- Born: 16 September 1965 (age 60)

Sport
- Sport: Wrestling
Medal record
Men's Greco-Roman wrestling
Representing Iran
Asian Games
Bronze medal – third place	1986 Seoul	62 kg
Asian Championships
Gold medal – first place	1992 Tehran	74 kg
Silver medal – second place	1991 Tehran	74 kg
Bronze medal – third place	1993 Hiroshima	74 kg

Ahad Javansalehi (Persian: احد جوانصالحی, born 16 September 1965 in Ardabil) is an Iranian wrestler. He competed at the 1988 Summer Olympics and the 1992 Summer Olympics.
