= Abdollah Chamangoli =

Iranian wrestler (born 1971)

Abdollah Chamangoli عبدالله چمن‌گلی
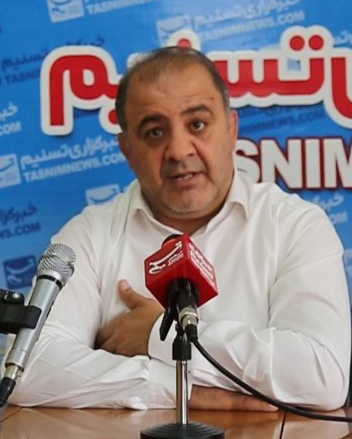

Personal information
- Nationality: Iranian
- Born: 22 September 1971 (age 54) Saqqez, Iran

Sport
- Sport: Greco-Roman wrestling
Medal record
Representing Iran
Asian Championships
Gold medal – first place	1991 Tehran	68 kg
Gold medal – first place	1992 Tehran	68 kg
Silver medal – second place	1993 Hiroshima	68 kg
Bronze medal – third place	1989 Oarai	68 kg

Abdollah Chamangoli (Persian: عبدالله چمن‌گلی, born 22 September 1971) is an Iranian retired wrestler. He competed in the men's Greco-Roman 68 kg at the 1992 Summer Olympics.
