= Iraj Khorshidfar =

Iranian Greco-Roman wrestler

Personal information
- Born: Rey, Iran

Sport
- Sport: Greco-Roman wrestling
Medal record
Representing Iran
World Championships
Bronze medal – third place	1966 Toledo	63 kg

Iraj Khorshidfar (Persian: ایرج خورشیدفر) is an Iranian former Greco-Roman wrestler. He won a bronze medal at the 1966 World Championships in Toledo, Ohio.
