= Ayat Vagozari =

Iranian wrestler (born 1961)

Personal information
- Full name: Ayatollah Vagozari
- Born: 26 July 1961 (age 64) Juybar

Sport
- Sport: Freestyle wrestling
Medal record
Representing Iran
Asian Games
Silver medal – second place	1990 Beijing	82 kg
Asian Championships
Gold medal – first place	1987 Mumbai	74 kg

Ayat Vagozari (Persian: آیت واگذاری; born 26 July 1961, in Juybar) is a retired freestyle wrestler from Iran. He won a silver medal at the 1990 Asian Games. He also participated at the 1988 Summer Olympics.

His brother Aziz Vagozari is also an Asian Champion in freestyle wrestling.
