= Mohammad Faghiri =

Iranian wrestler (born 1985)

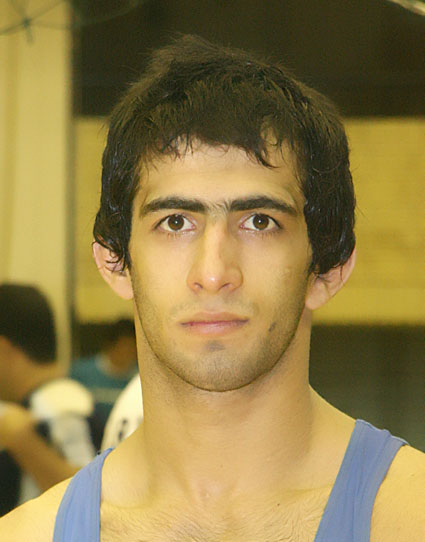
- Mohammad Faghiri

Personal information
- Native name: محمد فقیری
- Full name: Mohammad Faghiri
- Nationality: Iran
- Born: January 14, 1985 (age 41) Iran
- Weight: 55 kg (121 lb)

Sport
- Country: Iran
- Sport: Sport wrestling

Mohammad Faghiri (Persian: محمد فقیری, born January 14, 1985, Iran) is an Iranian wrestler.
