= Morad Ali Shirani =

Iranian wrestler (born 1955)

Personal information
- Born: 21 March 1955 (age 71) Isfahan

Sport
- Sport: Greco-Roman wrestling
Medal record
Representing Iran
World Championships
Bronze medal – third place	1977 Gothenburg	52 kg

Morad Ali Shirani (Persian: مرادعلی شیرانی; born 21 March 1955) is a retired Greco-Roman wrestler from Iran. He won a bronze medal at the 1977 World Championships. He also participated at the 1976 Summer Olympics.
