= Firouz Alizadeh =

Iranian Greco-Roman wrestler

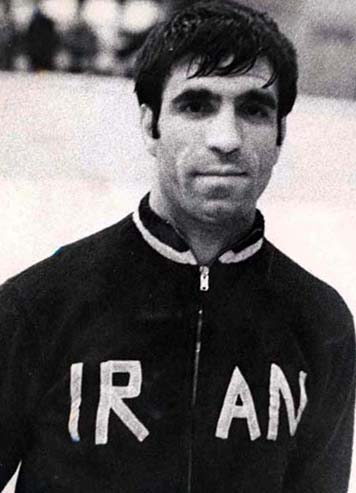

Personal information
- Born: 30 October 1946
- Died: 2005 (aged 58–59)
- Height: 167 cm (5 ft 6 in)

Sport
- Sport: Greco-Roman wrestling
Medal record
Representing Iran
World Championships
Gold medal – first place	1969 Mar del Plata	-52 kg

Firouz Alizadeh (Persian: فیروز علی‌زاده, 30 October 1946 – 2005) was a bantamweight Greco-Roman wrestler from Iran. He won the world title in 1969 and competed at the 1972 Summer Olympics.
