= Alireza Ghelichkhani =

Iranian Greco-Roman wrestler (c.1937–2018)

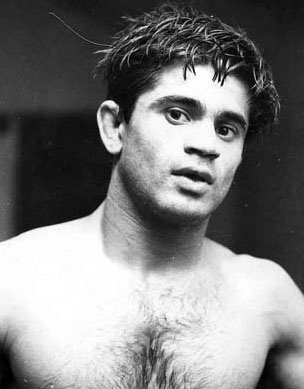

Personal information
- Born: c. 1937
- Died: 15 October 2018

Sport
- Sport: Greco-Roman wrestling
Medal record
Representing Iran
World Wrestling Championships
Bronze medal – third place	1961 Yokohama	-62 kg

Alireza Ghelichkhani (Persian: علیرضا قلیج‌خانی) (c. 1937 – 15 October 2018) was a Greco-Roman wrestler from Iran. He won a bronze medal at the 1961 World Championships.
