= Yoshihiko Hara =

Japanese wrestler (born 1964)

Personal information
- Full name: 原喜彦 Hara Yoshihiko
- Nationality: Japanese
- Born: 11 February 1964 (age 61); Niigata, Japan

Sport
- Sport: Wrestling

Yoshihiko Hara (born 11 February 1964) is a Japanese wrestler. He competed at the 1988 Summer Olympics and the 1992 Summer Olympics.
