= Ahad Pazaj =

Iranian Greco-Roman wrestler

Personal information
- Full name: Ahad Pazaj
- Nationality: Iran
- Born: 22 June 1970 (age 56) Ardabil, Imperial State of Iran
- Height: 1.73 m (5 ft 8 in)
- Weight: 62 kg (137 lb)

Sport
- Style: Greco-Roman
- Club: Takhti Sport Club Ardabil
Medal record
Men's Greco-Roman wrestling
Representing Iran
Asian Games
Bronze medal – third place	1990 Beijing	57 kg
Asian Championships
Gold medal – first place	1987 Mumbai	52 kg
Gold medal – first place	1992 Tehran	62 kg
Gold medal – first place	1993 Hiroshima	62 kg
Silver medal – second place	1996 Xiaoshan	62 kg
Bronze medal – third place	1995 Manila	62 kg

Ahad Pazaj (Persian: احد پازاج; born June 22, 1970, in Ardabil, Iran) was an Iranian Greco-Roman wrestler, and coach of Iranian Greco-Roman wrestling team.
