= Masoud Ghadimi =

Iranian wrestler (1965–2003)

Personal information
- Nationality: Iranian
- Born: 1 February 1965
- Died: 26 June 2003 (aged 38)

Sport
- Sport: Wrestling
Medal record
Men's Greco-Roman wrestling
Representing Iran
Asian Games
Bronze medal – third place	1990 Beijing	74 kg

Masoud Ghadimi (Persian: مسعود قدیمی, 1 February 1965 – 26 June 2003) was an Iranian wrestler. He competed in the men's Greco-Roman 68 kg at the 1988 Summer Olympics. He got injured seriously while training in 1997 and died six years later on 26 June 2003.
