= Ali Mohammadi (wrestler) =

Iranian wrestler (born 1984)

Personal information
- Full name: Ali Mohammadi
- Nationality: Iran
- Born: 7 February 1984 (age 42) Karaj, Iran
- Height: 1.70 m (5 ft 7 in)
- Weight: 66 kg (146 lb)

Sport
- Sport: Wrestling
- Event: Greco-Roman
- Club: Enghelab Club
Medal record
Men's Greco-Roman wrestling
Representing Iran
Asian Championships
Gold medal – first place	2011 Tashkent	66 kg
Bronze medal – third place	2007 Bishkek	66 kg

Ali Mohammadi (Persian: علی محمدی; born 7 February 1984) is an amateur Iranian Greco-Roman wrestler. He won the bronze medal for the men's welterweight category at the 2007 Asian Wrestling Championships in Bishkek, Kyrgyzstan.

Mohammadi represented Iran at the 2008 Summer Olympics in Beijing, where he competed for the 66 kg class in men's Greco-Roman wrestling. He lost the second preliminary match to Belarus' Mikhail Siamionau, with a classification score of 1–3.
