= Lodoin Enkhbayar =

Mongolian wrestler (born 1964)

Personal information
- National team: Mongolia
- Born: 1 October 1964 (age 61)
- Height: 177 cm (5 ft 10 in)
- Weight: 74 kg (163 lb)

Sport
- Sport: Wrestling
- Club: Altai Eagles;Ulan Bataar
- Coached by: Aduch Baskhuu
Medal record
Men's freestyle wrestling
Representing Mongolia
World Cup
Bronze medal – third place	1987 Ulaanbaatar	74 kg
Asian Games
Silver medal – second place	1990 Beijing	74 kg
Asian Championships
Gold medal – first place	1991 New Delhi	74 kg
Bronze medal – third place	1989 Oarai Ibaraki	74 kg
Bronze medal – third place	1992 Tehran	74 kg

Lodoin Enkhbayar (born 1 October 1964) is a Mongolian wrestler. He competed at the 1988 Summer Olympics and the 1992 Summer Olympics. His twin brother Lodoin Erkhbayar is also a World Wrestling Championships bronze medalist.
