= Hassan Babak =

Iranian wrestler (born 1960)

Personal information
- Nationality: Iranian
- Born: 28 September 1960 (age 65)

Sport
- Sport: Wrestling
Medal record
Men's Greco-Roman wrestling
Representing Iran
Asian Games
Silver medal – second place	1994 Hiroshima	90 kg
Asian Championships
Gold medal – first place	1983 Tehran	90 kg
Gold medal – first place	1992 Tehran	90 kg
Silver medal – second place	1987 Mumbai	90 kg
Silver medal – second place	1989 Oarai	90 kg

Hassan Babak (Persian: حسن بابک, born 28 September 1960) is an Iranian wrestler. He competed in the men's Greco-Roman 90 kg at the 1992 Summer Olympics.
