= Abdul Majeed Maruwala =

Pakistani wrestler (born 1963)

Abdul Majeed Maruwala (born 1 February 1963) is an Asian Games champion former wrestler who represented Pakistan in wrestling internationally. He competed in the 1984 Summer Olympics and in the 1988 Summer Olympics.

Maruwala won the gold medal in the light-heavyweight -90 kg freestyle event at the 1986 Asian Games.
