= Hassan Yousefi Afshar =

Iranian wrestler (born 1966)

Personal information
- Native name: Hassan
- Full name: Hassan Yousefi Afshar
- Nationality: Iranian
- Born: October 8, 1966 (age 59) Tehran, Iran

Sport
- Country: Iran
- Sport: Wrestling
- Event: Greco-Roman
Medal record
Representing Iran
Asian Games
Silver medal – second place	1990 Beijing	62 kg
Asian Championships
Gold medal – first place	1991 Tehran	62 kg
Silver medal – second place	1989 Oarai	62 kg

Hassan Yousefi Afshar (Persian: حسن یوسفی افشار; born 8 October 1966) is an Iranian wrestler. He is an Asian Champion in Greco-Roman wrestling.

== Career ==
Yousefi Afshar earned a Silver medal at the 1989 Asian Wrestling Championships in the 62 kg division, in Oaray, Japan.

He won a silver medal for the second time at the 1990 Asian Wrestling Championships in the 62 kg division, in Beijing, China. Yousefi earned gold at the 1991 Tehran, 1989 Asian Wrestling Championships in the 62 kg division, in Tehran, Iran.

== Other honors ==
Membership in the Greco-Roman wrestling Nation team of the Islamic Republic of Iran 1988-1993

- Fourth Rank at the 1993 Asian Wrestling Championships, Hiroshima, Japan.
- Eighth Rank at the 1990 World wrestling Championships, Rome, Italy.
- Gold Medal at the 1991 Takhti International Cup in Tehran, Iran.
- Gold Medal at the 1993 Jomhuriat International Cup in Istanbul, Turkey.

== Achievements ==
- Chairperson of the International Institute of the Wrestling Federation of the Islamic Republic of Iran, 2020.
- International Instructor In Italy, 2018,
- Instructor at the International Institute of the Wrestling Federation the Islamic Republic of Iran, 2000-2020.
- Head of Greco-Roman wrestling Scouting (Talent Discovery Committee) of the Wrestling Federation of the Islamic Republic of Iran, 2014.
- Head Coach and Coach of Iranian cadet, junior, and adult Greco-Roman wrestling Nation Teams, 2002-2007, and 2009, Technical manager and head coach of child, cadet, junior and adult teams of Tehran Province, 2000-2015.
- First-Class International Coach 2009 Yerevan, Armenia
- First-Class coach in the Islamic Republic of Iran 2000-2020
- Top coach chosen by the Wrestling Federation of Islamic Republic of Iran, 2005 and 2006.
- Head Coach of the Iranian Greco-Roman wrestling at the asian club cup in Jordan with Six gold medals.
- Coach who trained many world and Asia champions.
