= Reza Simkhah =

Iranian wrestler (born 1970)

Medal record

Representing Iran

Men's Greco-Roman wrestling

World Championships
Silver medal – second place	1991 Varna	48 kg

Asian Games
Silver medal – second place	1994 Hiroshima	48 kg
Bronze medal – third place	1990 Beijing	48 kg

Asian Championships
Gold medal – first place	1991 Tehran	48 kg

Majid Reza Simkhah Asil (Persian: مجيدرضا سيمخواه اصيل, born 1 February 1970) is an Iranian wrestler.
