= Wrestling at the 1988 Summer Olympics – Men's Greco-Roman 68 kg =

Men's Greco-Roman 68 kg at the Games of the XXIV Olympiad
- Venue: Sangmu Gymnasium
- Dates: 20–22 September 1988
- Competitors: 31 from 31 nations

Medalists
1st place, gold medalist(s)		Levon Julfalakyan	Soviet Union
2nd place, silver medalist(s)		Kim Sung-moon	South Korea
3rd place, bronze medalist(s)		Tapio Sipilä	Finland

The Men's Greco-Roman 68 kg at the 1988 Summer Olympics as part of the wrestling program were held at the Sangmu Gymnasium, Seongnam.

== Tournament results ==
The wrestlers are divided into 2 groups. The winner of each group decided by a double-elimination system.

Legend

- TF — Won by Fall
- SP — Won by Superiority, 12-14 points difference, the loser with points
- SO — Won by Superiority, 12-14 points difference, the loser without points
- ST — Won by Technical Superiority, 15 points difference
- PP — Won by Points, the loser with technical points
- PO — Won by Points, the loser without technical points
- P0 — Won by Passivity, scoring zero points
- P1 — Won by Passivity, while leading by 1-11 points
- PS — Won by Passivity, while leading by 12-14 points
- PA — Won by Opponent Injury
- DQ — Won by Forfeit
- DNA — Did not appear
- L — Losses
- ER — Round of Elimination
- CP — Classification Points
- TP — Technical Points

=== Eliminatory round ===
==== Group A ====
L		CP	TP		L
Round 1
1	Zouheir Hory (SYR)	0-3 P1	4:25	Herminio Hidalgo (PAN)	0
0	Francisco Barcia (ESP)	3-1 PP	7-5	Daniel Navarrete (ARG)	1
1	Morten Brekke (NOR)	0-3 PO	0-5	Kim Sung-moon (KOR)	0
1	Abdullah Al-Shamsi (YAR)	0-4 TF	2:43	Yasuhiro Okubo (JPN)	0
0	Masoud Ghadimi (IRI)	3-1 PP	2-1	Zhao Jianqiang (CHN)	1
1	Franck Abrial (FRA)	0-3 PO	0-7	Claudio Passarelli (FRG)	0
0	Said Souaken (MAR)	3-0 P1	5:40	Gustavo Manzur (ESA)	1
1	Nandor Sabo (YUG)	0-3.5 SO	0-13	Tapio Sipilä (FIN)	0
Round 2
1	Zouheir Hory (SYR)	4-0 ST	15-0	Francisco Barcia (ESP)	1
0	Herminio Hidalgo (PAN)	3-0 P1	5:42	Daniel Navarrete (ARG)	2
1	Morten Brekke (NOR)	4-0 ST	17-0	Abdullah Al-Shamsi (YAR)	2
0	Kim Sung-moon (KOR)	3-1 PP	10-1	Yasuhiro Okubo (JPN)	1
1	Masoud Ghadimi (IRI)	0-4 TF	1:07	Franck Abrial (FRA)	1
2	Zhao Jianqiang (CHN)	1-3 PP	1-8	Claudio Passarelli (FRG)	0
1	Said Souaken (MAR)	0-3 P1	1:59	Nandor Sabo (YUG)	1
2	Gustavo Manzur (ESA)	0-4 ST	0-15	Tapio Sipilä (FIN)	0
Round 3
2	Zouheir Hory (SYR)	0-3 P1	5:24	Morten Brekke (NOR)	1
0	Herminio Hidalgo (PAN)	3-0 P1	4:31	Francisco Barcia (ESP)	2
0	Kim Sung-moon (KOR)	4-0 DQ	5:46	Masoud Ghadimi (IRI)	2
1	Yasuhiro Okubo (JPN)	3-1 PP	7-6	Franck Abrial (FRA)	2
1	Claudio Passarelli (FRG)	1-3 PP	3-4	Nandor Sabo (YUG)	1
2	Said Souaken (MAR)	0-3 PO	0-7	Tapio Sipilä (FIN)	0
Round 4
1	Herminio Hidalgo (PAN)	1-3 PP	1-4	Morten Brekke (NOR)	1
0	Kim Sung-moon (KOR)	3-0 P1	5:08	Claudio Passarelli (FRG)	2
1	Yasuhiro Okubo (JPN)	3-1 PP	2-1	Nandor Sabo (YUG)	2
0	Tapio Sipilä (FIN)			Bye	
Round 5
0	Tapio Sipilä (FIN)	3-0 PO	2-0	Morten Brekke (NOR)	2
2	Herminio Hidalgo (PAN)	0-4 ST	2-18	Kim Sung-moon (KOR)	0
1	Yasuhiro Okubo (JPN)			Bye	
Round 6
2	Yasuhiro Okubo (JPN)	0-3 PO	0-10	Tapio Sipilä (FIN)	0
0	Kim Sung-moon (KOR)			Bye	
Round 7
0	Kim Sung-moon (KOR)	3-1 PP	8-3	Tapio Sipilä (FIN)	1

Wrestler	L	ER	CP
Kim Sung-moon (KOR)	0	-	20
Tapio Sipilä (FIN)	1	-	17.5
Yasuhiro Okubo (JPN)	2	6	11
Morten Brekke (NOR)	2	5	10
Herminio Hidalgo (PAN)	2	5	10
Nandor Sabo (YUG)	2	4	7
Claudio Passarelli (FRG)	2	4	7
Franck Abrial (FRA)	2	3	5
Zouheir Hory (SYR)	2	3	4
Francisco Barcia (ESP)	2	3	3
Masoud Ghadimi (IRI)	2	3	3
Said Souaken (MAR)	2	3	3
Zhao Jianqiang (CHN)	2	2	2
Daniel Navarrete (ARG)	2	2	1
Gustavo Manzur (ESA)	2	2	0
Abdullah Al-Shamsi (YAR)	2	2	0

==== Group B ====
L		CP	TP		L
Round 1
0	Jerzy Kopański (POL)	3-0 P1	5:36	Sümer Koçak (TUR)	1
1	Abdellatif Abdellatif (EGY)	0-3 PO	0-9	Lars Lagerborg (SWE)	0
0	Aristidis Grigorakis (GRE)	4-0 ST	15-0	Muneir Al-Masri (JOR)	1
1	Edmundo Ichillumpa (PER)	0-4 ST	0-16	Andrew Seras (USA)	0
1	Markus Pittner (AUT)	1-3 PP	2-5	Petrică Cărare (ROU)	0
1	Douglas Yeats (CAN)	0-4 ST	0-15	Levon Julfalakyan (URS)	0
1	Kiptoo Salbei (KEN)	0-4 ST	0-15	Georgi Karamanliev (BUL)	0
0	Attila Repka (HUN)			Bye	
Round 2
1	Attila Repka (HUN)	0-3 PO	0-4	Jerzy Kopański (POL)	0
1	Sümer Koçak (TUR)	4-0 TF	4:34	Abdellatif Abdellatif (EGY)	2
0	Lars Lagerborg (SWE)	3-0 P1	5:17	Aristidis Grigorakis (GRE)	1
2	Muneir Al-Masri (JOR)	0-4 TF	1:16	Edmundo Ichillumpa (PER)	1
0	Andrew Seras (USA)	4-0 ST	15-0	Markus Pittner (AUT)	2
0	Petrică Cărare (ROU)	3-0 P1	3:45	Douglas Yeats (CAN)	2
0	Levon Julfalakyan (URS)	4-0 ST	16-0	Kiptoo Salbei (KEN)	2
0	Georgi Karamanliev (BUL)			Bye	
Round 3
1	Georgi Karamanliev (BUL)	0-3 P1	5:10	Attila Repka (HUN)	1
1	Jerzy Kopański (POL)	0-0 DQ	5:22	Lars Lagerborg (SWE)	1
1	Sümer Koçak (TUR)	3-0 P1	4:14	Aristidis Grigorakis (GRE)	2
2	Edmundo Ichillumpa (PER)	0-4 ST	0-19	Petrică Cărare (ROU)	0
1	Andrew Seras (USA)	1-3 PP	2-9	Levon Julfalakyan (URS)	0
Round 4
2	Georgi Karamanliev (BUL)	0-3 P1	5:29	Jerzy Kopański (POL)	1
1	Attila Repka (HUN)	3-0 P1	3:35	Sümer Koçak (TUR)	2
2	Lars Lagerborg (SWE)	0-0 DQ	5:33	Andrew Seras (USA)	2
1	Petrică Cărare (ROU)	1-3 PP	4-8	Levon Julfalakyan (URS)	0
Round 5
2	Attila Repka (HUN)	0-3 PO	0-1	Petrică Cărare (ROU)	1
2	Jerzy Kopański (POL)	0-4 TF	0:34	Levon Julfalakyan (URS)	0

Wrestler	L	ER	CP
Levon Julfalakyan (URS)	0	-	18
Petrică Cărare (ROU)	1	-	14
Jerzy Kopański (POL)	2	5	9
Attila Repka (HUN)	2	5	6
Andrew Seras (USA)	2	4	9
Sümer Koçak (TUR)	2	4	7
Lars Lagerborg (SWE)	2	4	6
Georgi Karamanliev (BUL)	2	4	4
Aristidis Grigorakis (GRE)	2	3	4
Edmundo Ichillumpa (PER)	2	3	4
Markus Pittner (AUT)	2	2	1
Douglas Yeats (CAN)	2	2	0
Abdellatif Abdellatif (EGY)	2	2	0
Muneir Al-Masri (JOR)	2	2	0
Kiptoo Salbei (KEN)	2	2	0

=== Final round ===
	CP	TP	
7th place match
Morten Brekke (NOR)	3-1 PP	6-5	Attila Repka (HUN)
5th place match
Yasuhiro Okubo (JPN)	0-3 P1	5:07	Jerzy Kopański (POL)
Bronze medal match
Tapio Sipilä (FIN)	3-1 PP	7-4	Petrică Cărare (ROU)
Gold medal match
Kim Sung-moon (KOR)	1-3 PP	3-9	Levon Julfalakyan (URS)

== Final standings ==
1. Levon Julfalakyan (URS)
2. Kim Sung-moon (KOR)
3. Tapio Sipilä (FIN)
4. Petrică Cărare (ROU)
5. Jerzy Kopański (POL)
6. Yasuhiro Okubo (JPN)
7. Morten Brekke (NOR)
8. Attila Repka (HUN)
