= Wrestling at the 1988 Summer Olympics – Men's freestyle 68 kg =

Men's freestyle 68 kg at the Games of the XXIV Olympiad
- Venue: Sangmu Gymnasium
- Dates: 29 September–1 October 1988
- Competitors: 30 from 30 nations

Medalists
1st place, gold medalist(s)		Arsen Fadzaev	Soviet Union
2nd place, silver medalist(s)		Park Jang-soon	South Korea
3rd place, bronze medalist(s)		Nate Carr	United States

The Men's Freestyle 68 kg at the 1988 Summer Olympics as part of the wrestling program, were held at the Sangmu Gymnasium, Seongnam.

== Tournament results ==
The wrestlers were divided into two groups. The winner of each group was decided by a double-elimination system.

Legend

- TF — Won by fall
- SP — Won by superiority, 12-14 points difference, the loser with points
- SO — Won by Superiority, 12-14 points difference, the loser without points
- ST — Won by technical superiority, 15 points difference
- PP — Won by points, the loser with technical points
- PO — Won by points, the loser without technical points
- P0 — Won by passivity, scoring zero points
- P1 — Won by passivity, while leading by 1-11 points
- PS — Won by passivity, while leading by 12-14 points
- PA — Won by opponent injury
- DQ — Won by forfeit
- DNA — Did not appear
- L — Losses
- ER — Round of Elimination
- CP — Classification Points
- TP — Technical Points

=== Eliminatory round ===
==== Group A ====
L		CP	TP		L
Round 1
0	Mohamed El-Khodary (EGY)	4-0 ST	19-3	Gustavo Manzur (ESA)	1
0	Amar Wattar (SYR)	4-0 ST	17-2	Edmundo Ichillumpa (PER)	1
0	Kosei Akaishi (JPN)	4-0 TF	1:13	Dean-Carlos Manibog (PHI)	1
0	Herminio Hidalgo (PAN)	4-0 ST	19-3	Kiptoo Salbei (KEN)	1
0	Georgios Athanasiadis (GRE)	4-0 ST	15-0	Ho Bisgaltu (CHN)	1
1	Angel Yassenov (BUL)	1-3 PP	4-12	Arsen Fadzaev (URS)	0
1	Juan Caride (ESP)	0-4 TF	4:05	Jukka Rauhala (FIN)	0
0	Amir Reza Khadem (IRI)			Bye	
Round 2
0	Amir Reza Khadem (IRI)	4-0 ST	16-0	Essam El-Khodary (EGY)	1
2	Gustavo Manzur (ESA)	.5-3.5 SP	3-16	Amar Wattar (SYR)	0
2	Edmundo Ichillumpa (PER)	0-4 ST	0-15	Kosei Akaishi (JPN)	0
2	Dean Manibog (PHI)	0-4 ST	0-15	Herminio Hidalgo (PAN)	0
2	Kiptoo Salbei (KEN)	0-4 TF	0:17	Georgios Athanasiadis (GRE)	0
2	Ho Bisgaltu (CHN)	1-3 PP	3-12	Angel Yassenov (BUL)	1
0	Arsen Fadzaev (URS)	4-0 TF	3:50	Juan Caride (ESP)	2
0	Jukka Rauhala (FIN)			Bye	
Round 3
0	Jukka Rauhala (FIN)	3-1 PP	8-7	Amir Reza Khadem (IRI)	1
2	Essam El-Khodary (EGY)	1-3 PP	3-14	Amar Wattar (SYR)	0
0	Kosei Akaishi (JPN)	4-0 ST	15-0	Herminio Hidalgo (PAN)	1
1	Georgios Athanasiadis (GRE)	1-3 PP	2-3	Angel Yassenov (BUL)	1
0	Arsen Fadzaev (URS)			Bye	
Round 4
0	Arsen Fadzaev (URS)	3-1 PP	10-1	Jukka Rauhala (FIN)	1
1	Amir Reza Khadem (IRI)	4-0 ST	17-1	Amar Wattar (SYR)	1
0	Kosei Akaishi (JPN)	3-1 PP	5-4	Georgios Athanasiadis (GRE)	2
2	Herminio Hidalgo (PAN)	0-4 TF	1:31	Angel Yassenov (BUL)	1
Round 5
0	Arsen Fadzaev (URS)	3-1 PP	12-4	Amir Reza Khadem (IRI)	2
1	Jukka Rauhala (FIN)	3.5-0 SO	12-0	Amar Wattar (SYR)	2
0	Kosei Akaishi (JPN)	3-1 PP	5-3	Angel Yassenov (BUL)	2
Round 6
0	Arsen Fadzaev (URS)	3-0 PO	9-0	Kosei Akaishi (JPN)	1
1	Jukka Rauhala (FIN)			Bye	
Round 7
2	Jukka Rauhala (FIN)	0-3 PO	0-5	Kosei Akaishi (JPN)	1
0	Arsen Fadzaev (URS)			Bye	

Wrestler	L	ER	CP
Arsen Fadzaev (URS)	0	-	16
Kosei Akaishi (JPN)	1	-	21
Jukka Rauhala (FIN)	2	7	11.5
Angel Yassenov (BUL)	2	5	12
Amar Wattar (SYR)	2	5	10.5
Amir Reza Khadem (IRI)	2	5	10
Georgios Athanasiadis (GRE)	2	4	10
Herminio Hidalgo (PAN)	2	4	8
Essam El-Khodary (EGY)	2	3	5
Ho Bisgaltu (CHN)	2	2	1
Gustavo Manzur (ESA)	2	2	0.5
Kiptoo Salbei (KEN)	2	2	0
Edmundo Ichillumpa (PER)	2	2	0
Dean Manibog (PHI)	2	2	0
Juan Caride (ESP)	2	2	0

==== Group B ====
L		CP	TP		L
Round 1
0	Cris Brown (AUS)	3-1 PP	13-3	Daniel Navarrete (ARG)	1
1	Muneir Al-Masri (JOR)	0-4 ST	0-15	David McKay (CAN)	0
1	Gérard Santoro (FRA)	1-3 PP	4-9	Park Jang-Soon (KOR)	0
1	René Neyer (SUI)	1-3 PP	8-14	Andrzej Kubiak (POL)	0
0	Alexander Leipold (FRG)	3-1 PP	11-1	Satyawan Satyawan (IND)	1
0	Khenmedekhiin Amaraa (MGL)	4-0 ST	15-0	Mohammad Shir (AFG)	1
0	Nate Carr (USA)	4-0 ST	16-1	Attila Podolszki (HUN)	1
0	Fevzi Şeker (TUR)			Bye	
Round 2
1	Fevzi Şeker (TUR)	1-3 PP	2-3	Cris Brown (AUS)	0
1	Daniel Navarrete (ARG)	4-0 ST	15-0	Muneir Al-Masri (JOR)	2
0	David McKay (CAN)	3-1 PP	7-1	Gérard Santoro (FRA)	2
0	Park Jang-soon (KOR)	4-0 ST	15-0	René Neyer (SUI)	2
1	Andrzej Kubiak (POL)	1-3 PP	2-3	Alexander Leipold (FRG)	0
2	Satyawan Satyawan (IND)	1-3 PP	2-7	Khenmedekhiin Amaraa (MGL)	0
2	Mohammad Shir (AFG)	0-4 ST	0-15	Nate Carr (USA)	0
1	Attila Podolszki (HUN)			Bye	
Round 3
2	Attila Podolszki (HUN)	0-4 PA		Fevzi Şeker (TUR)	1
0	Cris Brown (AUS)	3-1 PP	7-1	David McKay (CAN)	1
2	Daniel Navarrete (ARG)	0-4 ST	0-15	Park Jang-soon (KOR)	0
2	Andrzej Kubiak (POL)	1-3 PP	2-4	Khenmedekhiin Amaraa (MGL)	0
1	Alexander Leipold (FRG)	1-3 PP	3-11	Nate Carr (USA)	0
Round 4
2	Fevzi Şeker (TUR)	1-3 PP	7-9	David McKay (CAN)	1
1	Cris Brown (AUS)	1-3 PP	2-5	Park Jang-soon (KOR)	0
1	Alexander Leipold (FRG)	3-1 PP	5-3	Khenmedekhiin Amaraa (MGL)	1
0	Nate Carr (USA)			Bye	
Round 5
0	Nate Carr (USA)	3-0 PO	6-0	Cris Brown (AUS)	2
1	David McKay (CAN)	3-1 PP	11-7	Alexander Leipold (FRG)	2
0	Park Jang-soon (KOR)	3-0 PO	5-0	Khenmedekhiin Amaraa (MGL)	2
Final Round
Round 6
0	Nate Carr (USA)	3-0 PO	9-0	David McKay (CAN)	1
0	Park Jang-soon (KOR)			Bye	
Round 7
0	Park Jang-soon (KOR)	3-1 PP	3-2	Nate Carr (USA)	1
1	David McKay (CAN)			Bye	
Round 8
2	David McKay (CAN)	1-3 PP	4-13	Park Jang-soon (KOR)	0
1	Nate Carr (USA)			Bye	

Wrestler	L	ER	CP	Tiebreaker
Park Jang-soon (KOR)	0	-	17	6
Nate Carr (USA)	0	-	14	4
David McKay (CAN)	1	-	14	1
Alexander Leipold (FRG)	2	5	11	
Khenmedekhiin Amaraa (MGL)	2	5	11	
Cris Brown (AUS)	2	5	10	
Fevzi Şeker (TUR)	2	4	6	
Daniel Navarrete (ARG)	2	3	5	
Andrzej Kubiak (POL)	2	3	5	
Attila Podolszki (HUN)	2	3	0	
Gérard Santoro (FRA)	2	2	2	
Satyawan Satyawan (IND)	2	2	2	
René Neyer (SUI)	2	2	1	
Mohammad Shir (AFG)	2	2	0	
Muneir Al-Masri (JOR)	2	2	0	

=== Final round ===
	CP	TP	
7th place match
Angel Yassenov (BUL)	1-3 PP	10-14	Alexander Leipold (FRG)
5th place match
Jukka Rauhala (FIN)	1-3 PP	1-4	David McKay (CAN)
Bronze medal match
Kosei Akaishi (JPN)	1-3 PP	1-5	Nate Carr (USA)
Gold medal match
Arsen Fadzaev (URS)	3-0 PO	6-0	Park Jang-soon (KOR)

== Final standings ==
1. Arsen Fadzaev (URS)
2. Park Jang-Soon (KOR)
3. Nate Carr (USA)
4. Kosei Akaishi (JPN)
5. David McKay (CAN)
6. Jukka Rauhala (FIN)
7. Alexander Leipold (FRG)
8. Angel Yassenov (BUL)
