= Peru at the 1988 Summer Olympics =

- IOC code: PER
- NOC: Peruvian Olympic Committee

in Seoul
- Competitors: 21 (7 men and 14 women) in 7 sports
- Flag bearer: Rodrigo Ranguna
- Medals Ranked 36th: Gold 0 Silver 1 Bronze 0 Total 1

Summer Olympics appearances (overview)
- 1900; 1904–1932; 1936; 1948; 1952; 1956; 1960; 1964; 1968; 1972; 1976; 1980; 1984; 1988; 1992; 1996; 2000; 2004; 2008; 2012; 2016; 2020; 2024; 2028

Peru competed at the 1988 Summer Olympics in Seoul, South Korea.

== Medalists ==
Medal	Name	Sport	Event	Date
Silver	Peru women's national volleyball team: Luisa Cervera; Alejandra de la Guerra; Denisse Fajardo; Miriam Gallardo; Rosa García; Sonia Heredia; Kathy Horny; Natalia Málaga; Gabriela Pérez del Solar; Cecilia Tait; Gina Torrealva; Cenaida Uribe	Volleyball	Women's tournament	29 September

== Competitors ==
The following is the list of number of competitors in the Games.

Sport	Men	Women	Total
Athletics	1	0	1
Shooting	3	0	3
Swimming	1	1	2
Table tennis	0	1	1
Volleyball	0	12	12
Weightlifting	1	–	1
Wrestling	1	–	1
Total	7	14	21

== Athletics ==
Men
Field events

Athlete	Event	Qualification		Final	
Athlete	Event	Distance	Position	Distance	Position
Ricardo Valiente	Long jump	6.92	32	Did not advance	
Ricardo Valiente	Triple jump	15.59	32	Did not advance	

== Shooting ==
Men

Athlete	Event	Qualification		Final	
Athlete	Event	Points	Rank	Points	Rank
Carlos Hora	10 metre air pistol	565	40	Did not advance	
Carlos Hora	50 metre pistol	540	39	Did not advance	

Mixed

Athlete	Event	Qualification		Final	
Athlete	Event	Points	Rank	Points	Rank
Juan Giha	Skeet	144	27	Did not advance	
Francisco Boza	Trap	195	3 Q	219	4

== Swimming ==
Men

Athlete	Event	Heats		Final A/B	
Athlete	Event	Time	Rank	Time	Rank
Alejandro Alvizuri	100 metre backstroke	58.37	26	Did not advance	
Alejandro Alvizuri	200 metre backstroke	2:04.29	19	Did not advance	

Women

Athlete	Event	Heats		Final A/B	
Athlete	Event	Time	Rank	Time	Rank
Karen Horning	100 metre breaststroke	1:14.03	28	Did not advance	
Karen Horning	200 metre breaststroke	2:37.84	24	Did not advance	

== Table tennis ==
Women

Athlete	Event	Group Stage						Round of 16	Quarterfinal	Semifinal	Final	
Athlete	Event	Opposition Result	Opposition Result	Opposition Result	Opposition Result	Opposition Result	Rank	Opposition Result	Opposition Result	Opposition Result	Opposition Result	Rank
Mónica Liyau	Singles	Hyun (KOR); L 1–3	Nolten (FRG); L 2–3	Hoshino (JPN); L 0–3	Owolabi (NGR); L 2–3	Fazlić (YUG); L 0–3	6	Did not advance				

== Volleyball ==
Summary

Team	Event	Group stage				Semifinal	Final / BM	
Team	Event	Opposition Score	Opposition Score	Opposition Score	Rank	Opposition Score	Opposition Score	Rank
Peru women's	Women's tournament	Brazil; W 3–0	China; W 3–2	United States; W 3–2	1 Q	Japan; W 3–2	Soviet Union; L 2–3	2nd place, silver medalist(s)

Team roster

- Katherine Horny
- Cenaida Uribe
- Rosa García
- Miriam Gallardo
- Gaby Pérez
- Sonia Heredia
- Cecilia Tait
- Luisa Cervera
- Denisse Fajardo
- Alejandra de la Guerra
- Gina Torrealva
- Natalia Málaga

Head coach

- Park Man-Bok

Group play

Pos	Team	Pld	W	L	Pts	SW	SL	SR	SPW	SPL	SPR	Qualification
1	Peru	3	3	0	6	9	4	2.250	177	142	1.246	1st–4th semifinals
2	China	3	2	1	5	8	4	2.000	161	132	1.220	1st–4th semifinals
3	United States	3	1	2	4	5	8	0.625	140	167	0.838	5th–8th semifinals
4	Brazil	3	0	3	3	3	9	0.333	126	163	0.773	5th–8th semifinals

Date		Score		Set 1	Set 2	Set 3	Set 4	Set 5	Total	Report
20 Sep	Peru	3–0	Brazil	15–11	15–11	15–3			45–25	Report
23 Sep	China	2–3	Peru	15–13	13–15	15–7	12–15	14–16	69–66	Report
25 Sep	Peru	3–2	United States	12–15	9–15	15–4	15–5	15–9	66–48	Report

Semifinal

Date		Score		Set 1	Set 2	Set 3	Set 4	Set 5	Total	Report
27 Sep	Japan	2–3	Peru	9–15	6–15	15–6	15–10	13–15	58–61	Report

Gold medal match

Date		Score		Set 1	Set 2	Set 3	Set 4	Set 5	Total	Report
29 Sep	Soviet Union	3–2	Peru	10–15	12–15	15–13	15–7	17–15	69–65	Report

== Weightlifting ==
Athlete	Event	Snatch		Clean & jerk		Total	Rank
Athlete	Event	Result	Rank	Result	Rank	Total	Rank
Rolando Marchinares	+110 kg	142.5	13	182.5	15	325.0	15

== Wrestling ==
Greco-Roman

Athlete	Event	Group Stage								Final	
Athlete	Event	Opposition Result	Opposition Result	Opposition Result	Opposition Result	Opposition Result	Opposition Result	Opposition Result	Rank	Opposition Result	Rank
Edmundo Ichillumpa	68 kg	Seras (USA); L 0–16	Al-Masri (JOR); W Fall	Cărare (ROU); L 0–19	Did not advance				9	Did not advance	

Freestyle

Athlete	Event	Group Stage								Final	
Athlete	Event	Opposition Result	Opposition Result	Opposition Result	Opposition Result	Opposition Result	Opposition Result	Opposition Result	Rank	Opposition Result	Rank
Edmundo Ichillumpa	68 kg	Wattar (SYR); L 2–17	Akaishi (JPN); L 0–15	Did not advance					12	Did not advance	
