= Wrestling at the 1984 Summer Olympics – Men's Greco-Roman 68 kg =

Men's Greco-Roman 68 kg at the Games of the XXIII Olympiad
- Venue: Anaheim Convention Center
- Dates: 1–3 August 1984
- Competitors: 14 from 14 nations

Medalists
1st place, gold medalist(s)		Vlado Lisjak	Yugoslavia
2nd place, silver medalist(s)		Tapio Sipilä	Finland
3rd place, bronze medalist(s)		James Martinez	United States

The Men's Greco-Roman 68 kg at the 1984 Summer Olympics as part of the wrestling program were held at the Anaheim Convention Center, Anaheim, California.

== Medalists ==
Gold	Vlado Lisjak; Yugoslavia
Silver	Tapio Sipilä; Finland
Bronze	James Martinez; United States

== Tournament results ==
The wrestlers are divided into 2 groups. The winner of each group decided by a double-elimination system.

Legend

- TF — Won by Fall
- ST — Won by Technical Superiority, 12 points difference
- PP — Won by Points, 1-7 points difference, the loser with points
- PO — Won by Points, 1-7 points difference, the loser without points
- SP — Won by Points, 8-11 points difference, the loser with points
- SO — Won by Points, 8-11 points difference, the loser without points
- P0 — Won by Passivity, scoring zero points
- P1 — Won by Passivity, while leading by 1-7 points
- PS — Won by Passivity, while leading by 8-11 points
- DC — Won by Decision, 0-0 score
- PA — Won by Opponent Injury
- DQ — Won by Forfeit
- DNA — Did not appear
- L — Losses
- ER — Round of Elimination
- CP — Classification Points
- TP — Technical Points

=== Eliminatory round ===
==== Group A ====
L		CP	TP		L
Round 1
1	Seiji Nemoto (JPN)	1-3 PP	5-6	Dietmar Streitler (AUT)	0
0	Sümer Koçak (TUR)	3-1 PP	12-9	Lee Yeun-Ik (KOR)	1
0	Ştefan Negrişan (ROU)	3-1 PP	7-3	Saïd Souaken (MAR)	1
0	Vlado Lisjak (YUG)			Bye	
Round 2
0	Vlado Lisjak (YUG)	3-0 PO	7-0	Seiji Nemoto (JPN)	2
0	Dietmar Streitler (AUT)	3-0 P1	5:28	Sümer Koçak (TUR)	1
2	Lee Yeun-Ik (KOR)	0-3 PO	0-5	Ştefan Negrişan (ROU)	0
1	Said Souaken (MAR)			Bye	
Round 3
2	Said Souaken (MAR)	1-3 PP	5-7	Dietmar Streitler (AUT)	0
0	Vlado Lisjak (YUG)	3-1 PP	11-4	Sümer Koçak (TUR)	2
0	Ştefan Negrişan (ROU)			Bye	
Final
	Ştefan Negrişan (ROU)	1-3 DC	0-0	Vlado Lisjak (YUG)	
	Dietmar Streitler (AUT)	0-3.5 PS	5:33	Ştefan Negrişan (ROU)	
	Vlado Lisjak (YUG)	3-1 PP	8-6	Dietmar Streitler (AUT)	

Wrestler	L	ER	CP	Final
Vlado Lisjak (YUG)	0	-	6	6
Ştefan Negrişan (ROU)	0	-	6	4.5
Dietmar Streitler (AUT)	0	-	9	1
Sümer Koçak (TUR)	2	3	4	
Said Souaken (MAR)	2	3	2	
Lee Yeun-Ik (KOR)	2	2	1	
Seiji Nemoto (JPN)	2	2	1	

==== Group B ====
L		CP	TP		L
Round 1
0	Mohamed Moutei Nakdali (SYR)	4-0 ST	12-0	Boris Goldstein (ARG)	1
0	Tapio Sipilä (FIN)	3-0 PO	5-0	Gerry Svensson (SWE)	1
0	James Martinez (USA)	4-0 TF	2:44	Antonios Papadopoulos (GRE)	1
0	Shaban Ibrahim (EGY)			Bye	
Round 2
1	Shaban Ibrahim (EGY)	0-4 TF	0:48	Mohamed Al-Nakdali (SYR)	0
2	Boris Goldstein (ARG)	0-4 ST	3-15	Tapio Sipilä (FIN)	0
2	Gerry Svensson (SWE)	0-4 TF	5:59	James Martinez (USA)	0
1	Antonios Papadopoulos (GRE)			Bye	
Round 3
2	Antonios Papadopoulos (GRE)	1-3 PP	3-5	Shaban Ibrahim (EGY)	1
1	Mohamed Al-Nakdali (SYR)	0-4 ST	0-12	Tapio Sipilä (FIN)	0
0	James Martinez (USA)			Bye	
Round 4
0	James Martinez (USA)	3-1 PP	9-7	Mohamed Al-Nakdali (SYR)	2
2	Shaban Ibrahim (EGY)	0-3 P1	1:19	Tapio Sipilä (FIN)	0
Final
	James Martinez (USA)	1-3 PP	2-5	Tapio Sipilä (FIN)	

Wrestler	L	ER	CP	Final
Tapio Sipilä (FIN)	0	-	14	3
James Martinez (USA)	1	-	11	1
Mohamed Al-Nakdali (SYR)	2	4	9	
Shaban Ibrahim (EGY)	2	4	3	
Antonios Papadopoulos (GRE)	2	3	1	
Gerry Svensson (SWE)	2	2	0	
Boris Goldstein (ARG)	2	2	0	

=== Final round ===
	CP	TP	
5th place match
Dietmar Streitler (AUT)	3-1 PP	8-4	Mohamed Al-Nakdali (SYR)
Bronze medal match
Ştefan Negrişan (ROU)	0-4 TF	0:25	James Martinez (USA)
Gold medal match
Vlado Lisjak (YUG)	4-0 TF	0:57	Tapio Sipilä (FIN)

== Final standings ==
1. Vlado Lisjak (YUG)
2. Tapio Sipilä (FIN)
3. James Martinez (USA)
4. Ştefan Negrişan (ROU)
5. Dietmar Streitler (AUT)
6. Mohamed Al-Nakdali (SYR)
7. Shaban Ibrahim (EGY)
8. Sümer Koçak (TUR)
