= Wrestling at the 1992 Summer Olympics – Men's Greco-Roman 68 kg =

Men's Greco-Roman 68 kg at the Games of the XXV Olympiad
- Venue: Institut Nacional d'Educació Física de Catalunya
- Dates: 26–28 July 1992
- Competitors: 19 from 19 nations

Medalists
1st place, gold medalist(s)		Attila Repka	Hungary
2nd place, silver medalist(s)		Islam Dugushiev	Unified Team
3rd place, bronze medalist(s)		Rodney Smith	United States

The men's Greco-Roman 68 kilograms at the 1992 Summer Olympics as part of the wrestling program were held at the Institut Nacional d'Educació Física de Catalunya from July 28 to July 30. The wrestlers are divided into 2 groups. The winner of each group decided by a double-elimination system.

== Results ==
Legend

- WO — Won by walkover

=== Elimination A ===
==== Round 1 ====
	Score		CP
Abdollah Chamangoli (IRI)	6–0	Mazouz Ben Djedaa (ALG)	3–0 PO
Valeri Nikitin (EST)	9–6	Kim Sung-moon (KOR)	3–1 PP
Islam Dugushiev (EUN)	3–1	Cecilio Rodríguez (CUB)	3–1 PP
Takumi Mori (JPN)	0–1	Ryszard Wolny (POL)	0–3 PO
Claudio Passarelli (GER)	1–0	Marthin Kornbakk (SWE)	3–0 PO

==== Round 2 ====
	Score		CP
Abdollah Chamangoli (IRI)	7–5	Valeri Nikitin (EST)	3–1 PP
Mazouz Ben Djedaa (ALG)	0–15	Kim Sung-moon (KOR)	0–4 ST
Islam Dugushiev (EUN)	2–0	Takumi Mori (JPN)	3–0 PO
Cecilio Rodríguez (CUB)	1–0	Claudio Passarelli (GER)	3–0 PO
Ryszard Wolny (POL)	3–1	Marthin Kornbakk (SWE)	3–1 PP

==== Round 3 ====
	Score		CP
Abdollah Chamangoli (IRI)	1–5	Kim Sung-moon (KOR)	1–3 PP
Valeri Nikitin (EST)	0–4	Islam Dugushiev (EUN)	0–3 PO
Cecilio Rodríguez (CUB)	6–1	Ryszard Wolny (POL)	3–1 PP
Claudio Passarelli (GER)		Bye	

==== Round 4 ====
	Score		CP
Claudio Passarelli (GER)	0–1	Abdollah Chamangoli (IRI)	0–3 PO
Kim Sung-moon (KOR)	1–10	Cecilio Rodríguez (CUB)	1–3 PP
Islam Dugushiev (EUN)	5–1	Ryszard Wolny (POL)	3–1 PP

==== Round 5 ====
	Score		CP
Abdollah Chamangoli (IRI)	0–8	Islam Dugushiev (EUN)	0–3 PO
Cecilio Rodríguez (CUB)		Bye	

==== Round 6 ====
	Score		CP
Cecilio Rodríguez (CUB)	10–2	Abdollah Chamangoli (IRI)	3–1 PP
Islam Dugushiev (EUN)		Bye	

==== Summary ====
Pos	Athlete	Pld	W	L	R	CP	TP
1	Islam Dugushiev (EUN)	5	5	0	X (Note: Classification points: EUN 6, CUB 4, IRI 1)	15	22
2	Cecilio Rodríguez (CUB)	5	4	1	X	13	28
3	Abdollah Chamangoli (IRI)	6	3	3	X	11	17
—	Kim Sung-moon (KOR)	4	2	2	4	9	27
4	Ryszard Wolny (POL)	4	2	2	4	8	6
5	Claudio Passarelli (GER)	3	1	2	4	3	1
—	Valeri Nikitin (EST)	3	1	2	3	4	14
—	Marthin Kornbakk (SWE)	2	0	2	2	1	1
—	Mazouz Ben Djedaa (ALG)	2	0	2	2	0	0
—	Takumi Mori (JPN)	2	0	2	2	0	0

Source: Official Report

=== Elimination B ===
==== Round 1 ====
	Score		CP
Stoyan Stoyanov (BUL)	1–4	Attila Repka (HUN)	1–3 PP
Nandor Sabo (IOP)	2–4	Ghani Yalouz (FRA)	1–3 PP
Petrică Cărare (ROM)	15–0	Doug Yeats (CAN)	4–0 ST
Pedro Villuela (ESP)	1–6	Rodney Smith (USA)	1–3 PP
Matwai Baranov (ISR)		Bye	

==== Round 2 ====
	Score		CP
Matwai Baranov (ISR)	0–2	Stoyan Stoyanov (BUL)	0–3 PO
Attila Repka (HUN)	10–1	Nandor Sabo (IOP)	3–1 PP
Ghani Yalouz (FRA)	3–2	Petrică Cărare (ROM)	3–1 PP
Doug Yeats (CAN)	2–1	Pedro Villuela (ESP)	3–1 PP
Rodney Smith (USA)		Bye	

==== Round 3 ====
	Score		CP
Rodney Smith (USA)	4–0 Fall	Matwai Baranov (ISR)	4–0 TO
Stoyan Stoyanov (BUL)	2–3	Ghani Yalouz (FRA)	1–3 PP
Attila Repka (HUN)	6–0	Petrică Cărare (ROM)	3–0 PO
Doug Yeats (CAN)		Bye	

==== Round 4 ====
	Score		CP
Doug Yeats (CAN)	2–6	Rodney Smith (USA)	1–3 PP
Attila Repka (HUN)	6–0	Ghani Yalouz (FRA)	3–0 PO
Stoyan Stoyanov (BUL)	WO	Petrică Cărare (ROM)	0–4 PA

- Stoyan Stoyanov (BUL) and Petrică Cărare (ROM) were tied on classification points for fifth.

==== Round 5 ====
	Score		CP
Rodney Smith (USA)	0–10	Attila Repka (HUN)	0–3 PO
Ghani Yalouz (FRA)		Bye	

==== Round 6 ====
	Score		CP
Ghani Yalouz (FRA)	5–7	Rodney Smith (USA)	1–3 PP
Attila Repka (HUN)		Bye	

==== Summary ====
Pos	Athlete	Pld	W	L	R	CP	TP
1	Attila Repka (HUN)	5	5	0	X (Note: Classification points: HUN 6, USA 3, FRA 1)	15	36
2	Rodney Smith (USA)	5	4	1	X	13	23
3	Ghani Yalouz (FRA)	5	3	2	X	10	15
4	Doug Yeats (CAN)	3	1	2	4	4	4
5	Petrică Cărare (ROM)	4	2	2	3	9	17
—	Stoyan Stoyanov (BUL)	4	1	3	3	5	5
—	Matwai Baranov (ISR)	2	0	2	3	0	0
—	Nandor Sabo (IOP)	2	0	2	2	2	3
—	Pedro Villuela (ESP)	2	0	2	2	2	2

Source: Official Report

=== Finals ===
	Score		CP
9th place match
Claudio Passarelli (GER)	WO	Petrică Cărare (ROM)	
7th place match
Ryszard Wolny (POL)	1–0	Doug Yeats (CAN)	3–0 PO
5th place match
Abdollah Chamangoli (IRI)	WO	Ghani Yalouz (FRA)	0–4 EF
Bronze medal match
Cecilio Rodríguez (CUB)	3–6	Rodney Smith (USA)	1–3 PP
Gold medal match
Islam Dugushiev (EUN)	0–1	Attila Repka (HUN)	0–3 PO

== Final standing ==
Rank	Athlete
1st place, gold medalist(s)	Attila Repka (HUN)
2nd place, silver medalist(s)	Islam Dugushiev (EUN)
3rd place, bronze medalist(s)	Rodney Smith (USA)
4	Cecilio Rodríguez (CUB)
5	Ghani Yalouz (FRA)
6	Abdollah Chamangoli (IRI)
7	Ryszard Wolny (POL)
8	Doug Yeats (CAN)
9	Petrică Cărare (ROM)
10	Claudio Passarelli (GER)
