= Wrestling at the 1984 Summer Olympics – Men's freestyle 68 kg =

Men's freestyle 68 kg at the Games of the XXIII Olympiad
- Venue: Anaheim Convention Center
- Dates: 9–11 August 1984
- Competitors: 22 from 22 nations

Medalists
1st place, gold medalist(s)		You In-Tak	South Korea
2nd place, silver medalist(s)		Andrew Rein	United States
3rd place, bronze medalist(s)		Jukka Rauhala	Finland

The Men's Freestyle 68 kg at the 1984 Summer Olympics as part of the wrestling program were held at the Anaheim Convention Center, Anaheim, California.

== Medalists ==
Gold	You In-Tak; South Korea
Silver	Andrew Rein; United States
Bronze	Jukka Rauhala; Finland

== Tournament results ==
The wrestlers are divided into 2 groups. The winner of each group decided by a double-elimination system.

Legend

- TF — Won by Fall
- ST — Won by Technical Superiority, 12 points difference
- PP — Won by Points, 1-7 points difference, the loser with points
- PO — Won by Points, 1-7 points difference, the loser without points
- SP — Won by Points, 8-11 points difference, the loser with points
- SO — Won by Points, 8-11 points difference, the loser without points
- P0 — Won by Passivity, scoring zero points
- P1 — Won by Passivity, while leading by 1-7 points
- PS — Won by Passivity, while leading by 8-11 points
- DC — Won by Decision, 0-0 score
- PA — Won by Opponent Injury
- DQ — Won by Forfeit
- DNA — Did not appear
- L — Losses
- ER — Round of Elimination
- CP — Classification Points
- TP — Technical Points

=== Eliminatory round ===
==== Group A ====
L		CP	TP		L
Round 1
0	Dave McKay (CAN)	4-0 ST	13-0	Alexander Zammit (MLT)	1
0	Zsigmond Kelevitz (AUS)	4-0 ST	13-1	Ren Qin (CHN)	1
1	Francisco Iglesias (ESP)	0-4 TF	2:49	Steven Bayliss (GBR)	0
1	Hussain El-Din Hamed (EGY)	0-4 ST	0-12	Jukka Rauhala (FIN)	0
1	Georgios Athanasiadis (GRE)	.5-3.5 SP	1-9	Andrew Rein (USA)	0
0	René Neyer (SUI)			Bye	
Round 2
0	René Neyer (SUI)	4-0 TF	5:03	Dave McKay (CAN)	1
2	Alexander Zammit (MLT)	0-4 TF	1:01	Zsigmond Kelevitz (AUS)	0
1	Ren Qin (CHN)	4-0 ST	15-2	Francisco Iglesias (ESP)	2
1	Steven Bayliss (GBR)	1-3 PP	2-8	Hossameldin Hamed (EGY)	1
0	Jukka Rauhala (FIN)	3-1 PP	7-3	Georgios Athanasiadis (GRE)	2
0	Andrew Rein (USA)			Bye	
Round 3
0	Andrew Rein (USA)	3.5-.5 SP	13-4	René Neyer (SUI)	1
2	Dave McKay (CAN)	1-3 PP	3-6	Zsigmond Kelevitz (AUS)	0
2	Ren Qin (CHN)	1-3 PP	4-6	Hossameldin Hamed (EGY)	1
2	Steven Bayliss (GBR)	1-3 PP	3-10	Jukka Rauhala (FIN)	0
Round 4
0	Andrew Rein (USA)	3-0 PO	4-0	Zsigmond Kelevitz (AUS)	1
1	René Neyer (SUI)	3-1 PP	13-11	Hossameldin Hamed (EGY)	2
0	Jukka Rauhala (FIN)			Bye	
Round 5
1	Jukka Rauhala (FIN)	.5-3.5 SP	4-14	Andrew Rein (USA)	0
2	René Neyer (SUI)	1-3 PP	3-9	Zsigmond Kelevitz (AUS)	1
Final
	Andrew Rein (USA)	3-0 PO	4-0	Zsigmond Kelevitz (AUS)	
	Jukka Rauhala (FIN)	.5-3.5 SP	4-14	Andrew Rein (USA)	
	Zsigmond Kelevitz (AUS)	1-3 PP	5-6	Jukka Rauhala (FIN)	

Wrestler	L	ER	CP	Final
Andrew Rein (USA)	0	-	13.5	6.5
Jukka Rauhala (FIN)	1	-	10.5	3.5
Zsigmond Kelevitz (AUS)	1	-	14	1
René Neyer (SUI)	2	5	8.5	
Hossameldin Hamed (EGY)	2	4	7	
Steven Bayliss (GBR)	2	3	6	
Ren Qin (CHN)	2	3	5	
Dave McKay (CAN)	2	3	5	
Georgios Athanasiadis (GRE)	2	2	1.5	
Francisco Iglesias (ESP)	2	2	0	
Alexander Zammit (MLT)	2	2	0	

==== Group B ====
L		CP	TP		L
Round 1
0	José Betancourt (PUR)	4-0 TF	1:06	Boris Goldstein (ARG)	1
0	Fevzi Şeker (TUR)	4-0 ST	14-2	Ivan Valladares (PER)	1
1	Eric Brulon (FRA)	0-4 ST	1-13	You In-Tak (KOR)	0
0	Jagmander Balyan Singh (IND)	4-0 ST	14-0	Gustavo Manzur (ESA)	1
0	Erwin Knosp (FRG)	4-0 ST	13-0	Victor Kede Manga (CMR)	1
0	Masakazu Kamimura (JPN)			Bye	
Round 2
0	Masakazu Kamimura (JPN)	3-0 P1	5:36	José Betancourt (PUR)	1
2	Boris Goldstein (ARG)	0-4 TF	2:30	Fevzi Şeker (TUR)	0
2	Ivan Valladares (PER)	0-4 TF	2:59	Eric Brulon (FRA)	1
0	You In-Tak (KOR)	4-0 ST	19-7	Jagmander Balyan Singh (IND)	1
2	Gustavo Manzur (ESA)	0-3.5 PS	2:34	Erwin Knosp (FRG)	0
1	Victor Kede Manga (CMR)			Bye	
Round 3
2	Victor Kede Manga (CMR)	0-4 TF	1:08	Masakazu Kamimura (JPN)	0
2	José Betancourt (PUR)	0-4 ST	0-12	Fevzi Şeker (TUR)	0
2	Eric Brulon (FRA)	1-3 PP	5-10	Jagmander Balyan Singh (IND)	1
0	You In-Tak (KOR)	4-0 ST	12-0	Erwin Knosp (FRG)	1
Round 4
1	Masakazu Kamimura (JPN)	1-3 PP	4-11	You In-Tak (KOR)	0
0	Fevzi Şeker (TUR)	4-0 TF	2:32	Jagmander Balyan Singh (IND)	2
1	Erwin Knosp (FRG)			Bye	
Round 5
2	Erwin Knosp (FRG)	1-3 PP	2-6	Masakazu Kamimura (JPN)	1
1	Fevzi Şeker (TUR)	1-3 PP	2-7	You In-Tak (KOR)	0
Final
	Masakazu Kamimura (JPN)	1-3 PP	4-11	You In-Tak (KOR)	
	Fevzi Şeker (TUR)	1-3 PP	2-7	You In-Tak (KOR)	
	Masakazu Kamimura (JPN)	3-1 PP	5-5	Fevzi Şeker (TUR)	

Wrestler	L	ER	CP	Final
You In-Tak (KOR)	0	-	18	6
Masakazu Kamimura (JPN)	1	-	11	4
Fevzi Şeker (TUR)	1	-	17	2
Erwin Knosp (FRG)	2	5	8.5	
Jagmander Balyan Singh (IND)	2	4	7	
Eric Brulon (FRA)	2	3	5	
José Betancourt (PUR)	2	3	4	
Victor Kede Manga (CMR)	2	3	0	
Ivan Valladares (PER)	2	2	0	
Boris Goldstein (ARG)	2	2	0	
Gustavo Manzur (ESA)	2	2	0	

=== Final round ===
	CP	TP	
5th place match
Zsigmond Kelevitz (AUS)	3.5-.5 SP	11-3	Fevzi Şeker (TUR)
Bronze medal match
Jukka Rauhala (FIN)	4-0 PA	3:02	Masakazu Kamimura (JPN)
Gold medal match
You In-Tak (KOR)	3-1 PP	5-5	Andrew Rein (USA)

== Final standings ==
1. You In-Tak (KOR)
2. Andrew Rein (USA)
3. Jukka Rauhala (FIN)
4. Masakazu Kamimura (JPN)
5. Zsigmond Kelevitz (AUS)
6. Fevzi Şeker (TUR)
7. Erwin Knosp (FRG)
8. René Neyer (SUI)
