= Wrestling at the 1984 Summer Olympics – Men's freestyle 62 kg =

Men's freestyle 62 kg at the Games of the XXIII Olympiad
- Venue: Anaheim Convention Center
- Dates: 7–9 August 1984
- Competitors: 16 from 16 nations

Medalists
1st place, gold medalist(s)		Randall Lewis	United States
2nd place, silver medalist(s)		Kosei Akaishi	Japan
3rd place, bronze medalist(s)		Lee Jung-Keun	South Korea

The Men's Freestyle 62 kg at the 1984 Summer Olympics as part of the wrestling program were held at the Anaheim Convention Center, Anaheim, California.

== Medalists ==
Gold	Randall Lewis; United States
Silver	Kosei Akaishi; Japan
Bronze	Lee Jung-Keun; South Korea

== Tournament results ==
The wrestlers are divided into 2 groups. The winner of each group decided by a double-elimination system.

Legend

- TF — Won by Fall
- ST — Won by Technical Superiority, 12 points difference
- PP — Won by Points, 1-7 points difference, the loser with points
- PO — Won by Points, 1-7 points difference, the loser without points
- SP — Won by Points, 8-11 points difference, the loser with points
- SO — Won by Points, 8-11 points difference, the loser without points
- P0 — Won by Passivity, scoring zero points
- P1 — Won by Passivity, while leading by 1-7 points
- PS — Won by Passivity, while leading by 8-11 points
- DC — Won by Decision, 0–0 score
- PA — Won by Opponent Injury
- DQ — Won by Forfeit
- DNA — Did not appear
- L — Losses
- ER — Round of Elimination
- CP — Classification Points
- TP — Technical Points

=== Eliminatory round ===
==== Group A ====
L		CP	TP		L
Round 1
0	Selman Kaygusuz (TUR)	3-1 PP	6-5	Martin Herbster (FRG)	1
0	Lee Jung-Keun (KOR)	4-0 TF	0:55	José Inagaki (PER)	1
0	Carmelo Flores (PUR)	4-0 TF	2:48	Pascal Segning (CMR)	1
0	Kosei Akaishi (JPN)	3-1 PP	7-4	Bob Robinson (CAN)	1
Round 2
1	Selman Kaygusuz (TUR)	.5-3.5 SP	1-10	Lee Jung-Keun (KOR)	0
1	Martin Herbster (FRG)	4-0 TF	1:22	José Inagaki (PER)	2
1	Carmelo Flores (PUR)	0-4 TF	1:40	Kosei Akaishi (JPN)	0
2	Pascal Segning (CMR)	0-4 ST	0-13	Bob Robinson (CAN)	1
Round 3
1	Selman Kaygusuz (TUR)	4-0 ST	13-0	Carmelo Flores (PUR)	2
1	Martin Herbster (FRG)	3-1 PP	8-1	Kosei Akaishi (JPN)	1
0	Lee Jung-Keun (KOR)	3-1 PP	10-9	Bob Robinson (CAN)	2
Round 4
2	Selman Kaygusuz (TUR)	0-4 ST	0-12	Kosei Akaishi (JPN)	1
2	Martin Herbster (FRG)	0-4 TF	2:30	Lee Jung-Keun (KOR)	0
Final
	Lee Jung-Keun (KOR)	0-3 PO	0-7	Kosei Akaishi (JPN)	

Wrestler	L	ER	CP	Final
Kosei Akaishi (JPN)	1	-	12	3
Lee Jung-Keun (KOR)	0	-	14.5	0
Martin Herbster (FRG)	2	4	8	
Selman Kaygusuz (TUR)	2	4	7.5	
Bob Robinson (CAN)	2	3	6	
Carmelo Flores (PUR)	2	3	4	
Pascal Segning (CMR)	2	2	0	
José Inagaki (PER)	2	2	0	

==== Group B ====
L		CP	TP		L
Round 1
0	Gérard Santoro (FRA)	3.5-.5 SP	9-1	Daniel Navarrete (ARG)	1
1	Leonardo Camacho (BOL)	0-4 ST	0-12	Antonio La Bruna (ITA)	0
1	Mark Dunbar (GBR)	0-4 ST	0-12	Randall Lewis (USA)	0
1	Gian Singh (IND)	1-3 PP	2-6	Cris Brown (AUS)	0
Round 2
0	Gérard Santoro (FRA)	3.5-.5 SP	10-2	Leonardo Camacho (BOL)	2
2	Daniel Navarrete (ARG)	0-4 ST	0-13	Antonio La Bruna (ITA)	0
2	Mark Dunbar (GBR)	1-3 PP	5-6	Gian Singh (IND)	1
0	Randall Lewis (USA)	4-0 ST	13-1	Cris Brown (AUS)	1
Round 3
1	Gérard Santoro (FRA)	0-3 PO	0-5	Antonio La Bruna (ITA)	0
0	Randall Lewis (USA)	4-0 ST	12-0	Gian Singh (IND)	2
1	Cris Brown (AUS)			Bye	
Round 4
1	Cris Brown (AUS)	3.5-0 SO	8-0	Gérard Santoro (FRA)	2
1	Antonio La Bruna (ITA)	0-4 ST	3-15	Randall Lewis (USA)	0
Final
	Randall Lewis (USA)	4-0 ST	13-1	Cris Brown (AUS)	
	Antonio La Bruna (ITA)	0-4 ST	3-15	Randall Lewis (USA)	
	Cris Brown (AUS)	3-1 PP	4-3	Antonio La Bruna (ITA)	

Wrestler	L	ER	CP	Final
Randall Lewis (USA)	0	-	16	8
Cris Brown (AUS)	1	-	6.5	3
Antonio La Bruna (ITA)	1	-	11	1
Gérard Santoro (FRA)	2	4	7	
Gian Singh (IND)	2	3	4	
Mark Dunbar (GBR)	2	2	1	
Leonardo Camacho (BOL)	2	2	0.5	
Daniel Navarrete (ARG)	2	2	0.5	

=== Final round ===
	CP	TP	
5th place match
Martin Herbster (FRG)	3-1 PP	11-4	Antonio La Bruna (ITA)
Bronze medal match
Lee Jung-Keun (KOR)	3-1 PP	11-6	Cris Brown (AUS)
Gold medal match
Kosei Akaishi (JPN)	0-4 ST	11-24	Randall Lewis (USA)

== Final standings ==
1. Randall Lewis (USA)
2. Kosei Akaishi (JPN)
3. Lee Jung-Keun (KOR)
4. Cris Brown (AUS)
5. Martin Herbster (FRG)
6. Antonio La Bruna (ITA)
7. Selman Kaygusuz (TUR)
8. Gérard Santoro (FRA)
