= Khenmedekhiin Amaraa =

Mongolian wrestler

Personal information
- Nationality: Mongolian
- Born: 22 September 1964 (age 62) Sergelen, Töv Province, Mongol

Sport
- Sport: Wrestling
Medal record
Men's freestyle wrestling
Representing Mongolia
World Cup
Silver medal – second place	1987 Ulaanbaatar	68 kg
Asian Championships
Gold medal – first place	1989 Oarai	68 kg

Khenmedekhiin Amaraa (born 22 September 1964) is a Mongolian wrestler. He competed in the men's freestyle 68 kg at the 1988 Summer Olympics.

At the 1987 World Cup Amaraa received the silver medal in the 68 kg division, beating World Cup and Pan American Champion John Giura of USA.

At the 1989 Asian Championship he won the gold medal in the 68 kg division, defeating Olympic medalist Kosei Akaishi of Japan in the final.

At the 1990 "International '90" tournament Amaraa won the gold medal in the 68 kg event, beating reigning World Champion Boris Budaev of Soviet Union in the final.

== Results of 1989 Asian Championship ==
Sources:

- Gold - Khenmedekhiin Amaraa of Mongolia.
- Silver - two-time Olympic medalist Kosei Akaishi of Japan.
- Bronze - 1988 Olympic Vice Champion Park Jang-soon of South Korea.
- 4th place - Satyawan of India.
- 5th place - Akbar Fallah of Iran.
