= Sambo at the 1983 Pan American Games =

The 1983 Pan American Games included competitions in the martial art of Sambo for men and women at different weight bands. The United States finished with 8 gold medals in the event; the host nation Venezuela won 7, Cuba 3, Canada and Argentina one each.

== Men's competition ==
=== 48 kg ===
RANK	NAME
Gold medal	Manuel Linares (VEN)
Silver medal	James Jones (USA)
Bronze medal	Ángel Abreu (CUB)

=== 52 kg ===
RANK	NAME
Gold medal	Lewis Dorrance (USA)
Silver medal	Eduardo Miranda (CUB)
Bronze medal	Oscar Luna (VEN)

=== 57 kg ===
RANK	NAME
Gold medal	Steven Siroy (USA)
Silver medal	Aparicio Campos (CUB)
Bronze medal	Jorge Olvera (MEX)

=== 62 kg ===
RANK	NAME
Gold medal	Manuel Luna (VEN)
Silver medal	José Inagaki (PER)
Bronze medal	Rey Esteban Ramírez (CUB)

=== 68 kg ===
RANK	NAME
Gold medal	Bobby Sole (USA)
Silver medal	Rafael Meléndez (VEN)
Bronze medal	Jorge Navarrete (ARG)

=== 74 kg ===
RANK	NAME
Gold medal	Lazaro Ruiz (CUB)
Silver medal	Paul La Blanc (USA)
Bronze medal	Oscar Strático (ARG)

=== 82 kg ===
RANK	NAME
Gold medal	James Martin (USA)
Silver medal	Luis Delgado (VEN)
Bronze medal	Emilio Tamayo (CUB)

=== 90 kg ===
RANK	NAME
Gold medal	Garry Kallos (CAN)
Silver medal	Enrique Antonovich (ARG)
Bronze medal	Alberto Limonta (CUB)

=== 100 kg ===
RANK	NAME
Gold medal	Luis Mario Miranda (CUB)
Silver medal	Alfredo Young (ARG)
Bronze medal	Vertilio Amador (VEN)

=== + 100 kg ===
RANK	NAME
Gold medal	Bárbaro Morgan (CUB)
Silver medal	José Siso (VEN)
Bronze medal	Juan Blander (ARG)

== Women's competition ==
=== 44 kg ===
RANK	NAME
Gold medal	Roselis Palencia (VEN)
Silver medal	Donna C. Turk (USA)
Bronze medal	None

=== 48 kg ===
RANK	NAME
Gold medal	Dinora Castillo (VEN)
Silver medal	Andrea Godin (USA)
Bronze medal	None

=== 52 kg ===
RANK	NAME
Gold medal	Jan Trussell (USA)
Silver medal	Olga Lugo (VEN)
Bronze medal	None

=== 56 kg ===
RANK	NAME
Gold medal	Bexaide Alvarez (VEN)
Silver medal	Kelley Defoor (USA)
Bronze medal	None

=== 60 kg ===
RANK	NAME
Gold medal	Lynn Roethke (USA)
Silver medal	Angela Palavecino (ARG)
Bronze medal	Xiomara Orozco (VEN)

=== 64 kg ===
RANK	NAME
Gold medal	Grace Jividen (USA)
Silver medal	Nilka Coronel (VEN)
Bronze medal	Susana Martínez (ARG)

=== 68 kg ===
RANK	NAME
Gold medal	Rebeca Scott (USA) (stripped)
Silver medal	Isabel Farruggia (ARG)
Bronze medal	Carmen Graterol (VEN)

=== 72 kg ===
RANK	NAME
Gold medal	Laura Martinel (ARG)
Silver medal	Ginger Lewallen (USA)
Bronze medal	Trina Sosa (VEN)

=== 80 kg ===
RANK	NAME
Gold medal	Klarina Gómez (VEN)
Silver medal	Laura Carter (USA)
Bronze medal	None

=== + 80 kg ===
RANK	NAME
Gold medal	Ana Solórzano (VEN)
Silver medal	Betsy Darrow (USA)
Bronze medal	None

== Medal table ==
Place	Nation	Gold medal	Silver medal	Bronze medal	Total
1	United States	7	8	0	15
2	Venezuela	7	6	4	17
3	Cuba	3	2	4	9
4	Argentina	2	3	4	9
5	Canada	1	0	0	1
6	Peru	0	1	0	1
7	Mexico	0	0	1	1
Total		20	20	13	53
