= Matwai Baranov =

Israeli wrestler

Personal information
- Native name: מאטוויי ברנוב
- Born: September 2, 1965 (age 60)

Sport
- Style: Greco-Roman

Matwai Baranov (also known as "Matvai"; Hebrew: מאטוויי ברנוב; born September 2, 1965) is an Israeli former Olympic wrestler.

== Wrestling career ==
Baranov came 9th in the 1991 World Wrestling Championships at 68.0 kg. in Greco-Roman wrestling.

He competed for Israel at the 1992 Summer Olympics in Barcelona, Spain, in wrestling at the age of 26. He wrestled in the Men's Lightweight, Greco-Roman, and lost to Stoyan Stoyanov of Bulgaria in Round Two, and to bronze medal winner Rodney Smith of the United States in Round Three.
