= Manibog =

Manibog is a surname. Notable people with the surname include:

- Dean-Carlos Manibog (born 1968), Filipino wrestler
- Monty Manibog (1930–2016), Filipino-American wrestler, lawyer, and politician
