= 1988 Summer Olympics Parade of Nations =

During the Parade of Nations portion of the 1988 Summer Olympics opening ceremony, athletes from each country participating in the Olympics paraded in the arena, preceded by their flag. The flag was borne by a sportsperson from that country chosen either by the National Olympic Committee or by the athletes themselves to represent their country.

== Parade order ==
As the nation of the first modern Olympic Games, Greece entered the stadium first; whereas, the host nation South Korea marched last. Other countries entered in alphabetical order in the language of the host country (Korean), according with tradition and IOC guidelines. The collation method used is based on the names as written in Hangul, a traditional Korean alphabet.

Whilst most countries entered under their short names, a few entered under more formal or alternative names, mostly due to political and naming disputes. The Republic of China (commonly known as Taiwan) entered with the compromised name and flag of "Chinese Taipei" ("차이니스 타이페이") under 타 ta, while the conflicting People's Republic of China (commonly known as China) entered as "중화인민공화국" under 중.

Among the nations with Korean names starting with 이 i, several reorderings occurred due the geopolitics. Hangul alphabetic order would have dictated Iraq → Iran → Israel → Egypt → Italy → India → Indonesia → Japan. As its protocol name at the IOC is Islamic Republic of Iran, the iranian delegation was moved three spaces later in the parade while Israel was moved five spaces later and was (an additional two spaces past Iran), changing the parade order into Iraq → Egypt → Italy → India → Iran → Indonesia → Japan → Israel.

160 National Olympic Committees (NOC)s entered with their delegations on the Olympic Stadium. Eight NOCs made their Olympic debut: Aruba, American Samoa, Brunei, Cook Islands, Maldives, Vanuatu, Saint Vincent and the Grenadines, and South Yemen. South Africa was excluded since 1964 due to its apartheid policies. Seven nations were part of the 1988 Summer Olympics boycott and did not participate in the Games.

Notable flag bearers in the opening ceremony featured the following athletes: seven-time Olympian and Star sailor Hubert Raudaschl (Austria); defending Olympic champions Evelyn Ashford (United States) in the women's 100-metre dash; Jouko Salomaki (Finland) and Vasile Andrei (Romania) in Greco-Roman wrestling; Ernesto Canto (Mexico) in race walking; Agneta Andersson (Sweden) in the women's kayak sprinting; Matija Ljubek in the men's canoe sprinting; and six-time Olympian Reiner Klimke (Federal Republic of Germany), who led the West German team to a gold-medal victory in the equestrian dressage; synchronized swimmers Mikako Kotani (Japan) and Carolyn Waldo (Canada), who eventually topped the podium in both the solo and duet routines; eight-time Olympian and Star sailor Durward Knowles (the Bahamas); eventual gold medalists Ulf Timmermann (German Democratic Republic) in the men's shot put and Aleksandr Karelin (Soviet Union) in the super heavyweight Greco-Roman wrestling; five-time track sprinter and Moscow 1980 champion Pietro Mennea (Italy); long-distance runner Grete Andersen-Waitz (Norway), who bagged a silver medal in the inaugural women's marathon four years earlier; and world-number-three tennis player Gabriela Sabatini (Argentina) in the women's singles.

== List ==
The following is a list of each participating National Olympic Committee enter. The names are given in their official designations by the IOC protocol guides.

Some differences occurred between the official placard displays and the official announcements:

- A number of designations were abbreviated on the placards, but announced in full.
  - The United States delegation was announced as "the United States of America" and appeared on the placard as "U.S.A.".
  - The Soviet Union delegation was abbreviated in both the announcements and the placard.
- South Yemen's delegation was announced as "Yemen Democratic Republic", but appeared on the placard as "Dem. Rep. of Yemen".
- Egypt's delegation was announced as the "Arab Republic of Egypt", but appeared on the placard as "Egypt".
- The Central African Republic delegation was announced as "Central African Republic", but appeared on the placard as "Central Africa".
- Côte d'Ivoire's delegation was announced as "Ivory Coast", but appeared on the placard as "Côte d'Ivoire".
- Congo's delegation was announced as "People's Republic of Congo", but appeared on the placard as "Congo".
- Fiji's delegation was announced as "Fiji Islands", but appeared on the placard as "Fiji".

Order	Nation	Hangul	Roman transliteration	Flag bearer	Sport
1	Greece	그리스	Geuriseu	Babis Kholidis	Wrestling
2	Ghana	가나	Gana	John Myles-Mills	Athletics
3	Gabon	가봉	Gabong	Gisèle Ongollo	Athletics
4	Guyana	가이아나	Gaiana	Alfred Thomas	Boxing
5	Gambia	감비아	Gambia	Dawda Jallow	Athletics
6	Guatemala	과테말라	Gwatemalla	Carlos Silva	Shooting
7	Guam	괌	Gwam	Ricardo Blas	Judo
8	Grenada	그레나다	Geurenada	Agnes Griffith	Athletics
9	Guinea	기니	Gini	Ousmane Diallo	Wrestling
10	Equatorial Guinea	적도 기니	Jeokdo Gini	Manuel Rondo	Athletics
11	Nigeria	나이지리아	Naijiria	Yusuf Alli	Athletics
12	Netherlands	네덜란드	Nedeollandeu	Eric Swinkels	Shooting
13	Nepal	네팔	Nepal	Krishna Bahadur Basnet	Athletics
14	Norway	노르웨이	Noreuwei	Grete Andersen-Waitz	Athletics
15	Papua New Guinea	파푸아뉴기니	Papua-Nyugini	Pinye Malaibi	Weightlifting
16	New Zealand	뉴질랜드	Nyujillandeu	Ian Ferguson	Canoeing
17	Niger	니제르	Nijereu	Hassan Karimou	Athletics
18	Denmark	덴마크	Denmakeu	Anne Grethe Jensen	Equestrian
19	Dominican Republic	도미니카 공화국	Dominika Gonghwaguk	Juan Núñez	Athletics
20	German Dem. Rep.	독일 민주 공화국	Dogil Minju Gonghwaguk	Ulf Timmermann	Athletics
21	F. R. of Germany	독일 연방 공화국	Dogil Yeonbang Gonghwaguk	Reiner Klimke	Equestrian
22	Laos	라오스	Raoseu	Sitthixay Sacpraseuth	Athletics
23	Liberia	라이베리아	Raiberia	Samuel Birch	Athletics
24	Lebanon	레바논	Rebanon	Toni Khouri	Official
25	Lesotho	레소토	Resoto	Noheku Nteso	Athletics
26	Rumania	루마니아	Rumania	Vasile Andrei	Wrestling
27	Luxembourg	룩셈부르크	Ruksembureukeu	Roland Jacoby	Shooting
28	Rwanda	르완다	Reuwanda	Mathias Ntawulikura	Athletics
29	Libyan Arab Jamahiriya	리비아	Ribia	Said Farouk Al-Turki	Athletics
30	Liechtenstein	리히텐슈타인	Rihitensyutain	Yvonne Elkuch	Cycling
31	Malawi	말라위	Mallawi	George Mambosasa	Athletics
32	Malaysia	말레이시아	Malleisia	Nordin Mohamed Jadi	Athletics
33	Mali	말리	Malli	Mamadou Keita	Judo
34	Mexico	멕시코	Meksiko	Ernesto Canto	Athletics
35	Monaco	모나코	Monako	Stéphane Operto	Cycling
36	Morocco	모로코	Moroko	Faouzi Lahbi	Athletics
37	Mauritius	모리셔스	Morisyeoseu	Navind Ramsaran	Wrestling
38	Mauritania	모리타니	Moritani	Oumar Samba Sy	Wrestling
39	Mozambique	모잠비크	Mojambikeu	Sergio Fafitine	Swimming
40	Maldives	몰디브	Moldibeu	Hussein Haleem	Athletics
41	Malta	몰타	Molta	Joanna Agius	Archery
42	Mongolia	몽고	Monggo	Badmaanyambuugiin Bat-Erdene	Judo
43	U.S.A.	미국	Miguk	Evelyn Ashford	Athletics
44	Vanuatu	바누아투	Banuatu	Olivette Daruhi	Athletics
45	Bahrain	바레인	Barein	Ahmed Hamada Jassim	Athletics
46	Barbados	바베이도스	Babeidoseu	Elvis Forde	Athletics
47	Bahamas	바하마	Bahama	Durward Knowles	Sailing
48	Bangladesh	방글라데시	Banggeulladesi	Bazlur Mohamed Rahman	Swimming
49	Burma	버마	Beoma	Latt Zaw	Boxing
50	Bermuda	버뮤다	Beomyuda	Clarence Saunders	Athletics
51	Virgin Isl.	버진 제도	Beojin Jedo	Robert Fellner	Taekwondo
52	British Virgin Isl.	영국령 버진 제도	Yeonggungnyeong Beojin Jedo	Willis Todman	Athletics
53	Benin	베냉	Benaeng	Félicite Bada	Athletics
54	Venezuela	베네수엘라	Benesuella	Elizabeth Popper	Table tennis
55	Vietnam	베트남	Beteunam	Nguyễn Đình Minh	Athletics
56	Belgium	벨기에	Belgie	Dirk Crois	Rowing
57	Belize	벨리즈	Bellijeu	Fitzgerald Joseph	Cycling
58	Botswana	보츠와나	Bocheuwana	Shakes Kubuitsile	Boxing
59	Bolivia	볼리비아	Bollibia	Katerine Moreno	Swimming
60	Burkina Faso	부르키나파소	Bureukinapaso	Sounaila Sagnon	Boxing
61	Bhutan	부탄	Butan	Pema Tshering	Archery
62	Bulgaria	불가리아	Bulgaria	Vasil Etropolski	Fencing
63	Brazil	브라질	Beurajil	Walter Carmona	Judo
64	Brunei Darussalam	브루나이	Beurunai		
65	American Samoa	미국령 사모아	Migungnyeong Samoa	Maselino Masoe	Boxing
66	Western Samoa	서사모아	Seo-Samoa	Henry Smith	Athletics
67	Saudi Arabia	사우디아라비아	Saudiarabia	Salah Al-Mar	Official
68	Cyprus	사이프러스	Saipeureoseu	Mikhalakis Tymbios	Shooting
69	San Marino	산마리노	Sanmarino	Dominique Canti	Athletics
70	El Salvador	엘살바도르	Elsalbadoreu	Gustavo Manzur	Wrestling
71	Senegal	세네갈	Senegal	Amadou Dia Bâ	Athletics
72	St. Vincent & the Grenadines	세인트빈센트 그레나딘	Seinteubinsenteu Geurenadin	Orde Ballantyne	Athletics
73	U.S.S.R.	소련	Soryeon	Alexander Karelin	Wrestling
74	Somalia	소말리아	Somallia	Aboukar Hassan Adani	Athletics
75	Solomon Isl.	솔로몬 제도	Sollomon Jedo	Gustave Mansad	Chef de mission
76	Sudan	수단	Sudan	Omer Khalifa	Athletics
77	Surinam	수리남	Surinam	Realdo Jessurun	Cycling
78	Sri Lanka	스리랑카	Seurirangka	Daya Rajasinghe Nadarajasingham	Shooting
79	Swaziland	스와질란드	Seuwajillandeu	Sizwe Sydney Mdluli	Athletics
80	Sweden	스웨덴	Seuweden	Agneta Andersson	Canoeing
81	Switzerland	스위스	Seuwiseu	Cornelia Bürki	Athletics
82	Syria	시리아	Siria	Hafez El-Hussein	Athletics
83	Sierra Leone	시에라리온	Sierarion	Baba Ibrahim Suma-Keita	Athletics
84	Singapore	싱가포르	Singgaporeu	Ang Peng Siong	Swimming
85	United Arab Emirates	아랍에미리트	Arap-Emiriteu	Sultan Khalifa	Cycling
86	Aruba	아루바	Aruba	Bito Maduro	Judo
87	Argentina	아르헨티나	Areuhentina	Gabriela Sabatini	Tennis
88	Iceland	아이슬란드	Aiseullandeu	Bjarni Friðriksson	Judo
89	Haiti	아이티	Aiti	Deborah Saint Phard	Athletics
90	Ireland	아일랜드	Aillaendeu	Wayne McCullough	Boxing
91	Afghanistan	아프가니스탄	Apeuganiseutan	Mohammad Razigul	Wrestling
92	Andorra	안도라	Andora	Josep Graells	Athletics
93	Antigua	안티과	Antigwa	Jocelyn Joseph	Athletics
94	Netherlands Antilles	네덜란드령 안틸레스	Nedeollandeuryeong Antilleseu	Jan Boersma	Sailing
95	Algeria	알제리	Aljeri	Noureddine Tadjine	Athletics
96	Angola	앙골라	Anggolla	João N'Tyamba	Athletics
97	Spain	에스파냐	Eseupanya	Infanta Cristina	Sailing
98	Ecuador	에콰도르	Ekwadoreu	Liliana Chalá	Athletics
99	Great Britain	영국	Yeongguk	Ian C.B. Taylor	Field hockey
100	Dem. Rep. of Yemen	예멘 민주 공화국	Yemen Minju Gonghwaguk	Sahim Saleh Mehdi	Athletics
101	Yemen Arab Rep.	예멘 아랍 공화국	Yemen Arap Gonghwaguk	Abdullah Al-Shamsi	Wrestling
102	Oman	오만	Oman	Abdul Latif Al-Bulushi	Shooting
103	Australia	오스트레일리아	Oseuteureillia	Ric Charlesworth	Field hockey
104	Austria	오스트리아	Oseuteuria	Hubert Raudaschl	Sailing
105	Honduras	온두라스	Onduraseu	Santiago Fonseca	Athletics
106	Jordan	요르단	Yoreudan	Muneir Al-Masri	Wrestling
107	Uganda	우간다	Uganda	Patrick Lihanda	Boxing
108	Uruguay	우루과이	Urugwai	Jesús Posse	Rowing
109	Yugoslavia	유고슬라비아	Yugoseullabia	Matija Ljubek	Canoeing
110	Iraq	이라크	Irakeu	Abdul Wahab Ali	Table tennis
111	Egypt	이집트	Ijipteu	Mohamed Khorshed	Shooting
112	Italy	이탈리아	Itallia	Pietro Mennea	Athletics
113	India	인도	Indo	Kartar Dhillon Singh	Wrestling
114	Islamic Republic of Iran	이란	Iran	Mohamed Reza Tupchi	Wrestling
115	Indonesia	인도네시아	Indonesia	Tonny Maringgi	Table tennis
116	Japan	일본	Ilbon	Mikako Kotani	Synchronized swimming
117	Israel	이스라엘	Iseura'el	Itzhak Yonassi	Shooting
118	Jamaica	자메이카	Jameika	Merlene Ottey	Athletics
119	Zaire	자이르	Jaireu	Dikanda Diba	Athletics
120	Zambia	잠비아	Jambia	Samuel Matete	Athletics
121	Central Africa	중앙아프리카	Jung'ang-Apeurika	Fidèle Mohinga	Boxing
122	P. R. of China	중화 인민 공화국	Junghwa Inmin Gonghwaguk	Song Tao	Basketball
123	Djibouti	지부티	Jibuti	Hussein Ahmed Salah	Athletics
124	Zimbabwe	짐바브웨	Jimbabeuwe	James Gombedza	Athletics
125	Chad	차드	Chadeu	Paul Ngadjadoum	Athletics
126	Czechoslovakia	체코슬로바키아	Chekoseullobakia	Imrich Bugár	Athletics
127	Chile	칠레	Chille	Gert Weil	Athletics
128	Cameroon	카메룬	Kamerun	Frédéric Ebong-Salle	Athletics
129	Qatar	카타르	Katareu	Mohamed Al-Kaabi	Sailing
130	Canada	캐나다	Kaenada	Carolyn Waldo	Synchronized swimming
131	Kenya	케냐	Kenya	Patrick Waweru	Boxing
132	Cayman Isl.	케이맨 제도	Keiman Jedo	Alfred Ebanks	Cycling
133	Costa Rica	코스타리카	Koseutarika	Sigrid Niehaus	Swimming
134	Cote D'Ivoire	코트디부아르	Koteudibuareu	Clement N'Goran	Tennis
135	Colombia	콜롬비아	Kollombia	Jorge Molina	Shooting
136	Congo	콩고	Konggo	Jean-Didiace Bémou	Athletics
137	Kuwait	쿠웨이트	Kuweiteu	Jasem Al-Dowaila	Athletics
138	Cook Islands (Cook Isl.)	쿡 제도	Kuk Jedo	William Taramai	Athletics
139	Chinese Taipei	차이니스 타이페이	Chainiseu Taipei	Lee Fu-an	Athletics
140	Thailand	타이	Tai	Somchai Chanthavanich	Shooting
141	Tanzania	탄자니아	Tanjania	Ikaji Salum	Athletics
142	Turkey	터키	Teoki	Necmi Gençalp	Wrestling
143	Togo	토고	Togo	Akossi Gnalo	Athletics
144	Tonga	통가	Tongga	Siololovau Ikavuka	Athletics
145	Tunisia	튀니지	Twiniji	Sofiane Ben Letaief	Table tennis
146	Trinidad and Tobago	트리니다드 토바고	Teurinidadeu Tobago	Ian Morris	Athletics
147	Panama	파나마	Panama	Manuel Gutiérrez	Swimming
148	Paraguay	파라과이	Paragwai	Ramón Jiménez Gaona	Athletics
149	Pakistan	파키스탄	Pakiseutan	Nasir Ali	Field hockey
150	Peru	페루	Peru	Rodrigo Ranguna	Official
151	Portugal	포르투갈	Poreutugal	João Rebelo	Shooting
152	Poland	폴란드	Pollandeu	Bogdan Daras	Wrestling
153	Puerto Rico	푸에르토리코	Puereutoriko	Jesús Feliciano	Baseball
154	France	프랑스	Peurangseu	Philippe Riboud	Fencing
155	Fiji	피지	Piji	Sharon Pickering	Swimming
156	Finland	핀란드	Pillandeu	Jouko Salomäki	Wrestling
157	Philippines	필리핀	Pillipin	Joseph Eric Buhain	Swimming
158	Hungary	헝가리	Heonggari	István Vaskuti	Canoeing
159	Hong Kong	홍콩	Hongkong	Liu Fuk Man	Table tennis
160	Korea	대한민국	Daehan Minguk	Cho Yong-chul	Judo

== See also ==
- 1984 Summer Olympics national flag bearers
- 1992 Summer Olympics national flag bearers
