= Passarelli =

Passarelli is an Italian surname. Notable people with the surname include:

- Claudio Passarelli (born 1965), German former wrestler
- Eduardo Passarelli (1903–1968), Italian film actor
- Kenny Passarelli (born 1949), American bass guitarist
- Lucas Passarelli (born 1996), Brazilian football goalkeeper
- Pasquale Passarelli (born 1957), retired Italian-born German wrestler

Fictional characters:

- Eddie Passarelli of Third and Indiana
