= Antonios Papadopoulos =

Antonios Papadopoulos may refer to:

- Antonios Papadopoulos (painter) (1439–1481), Greek painter
- Antonios Papadopoulos (wrestler) (born 1964), Greek wrestler
- Antonios Papadopoulos (footballer) (born 1999), German footballer

== See also ==
- Antonis Papadopoulos Stadium, football stadium in Larnaca, Cyprus
