= Caride =

Caride is a surname. Notable people with the surname include:

- Alba Caride (born 1980), Spanish rhythmic gymnast
- Agustina Caride (born 1970), Argentine writer
- Juan Caride (born 1965), Spanish wrestler
- Kristhielee Caride (born 1991), Puerto Rican actress, teacher, athlete, model and beauty pageant titleholder, Miss Puerto Rico Universe 2016
- Marlene Caride (born 1963), American politician
