= Vlado Lisjak =

Croatian wrestler (born 1962)

Medal record

Men's Greco-Roman wrestling

Representing Yugoslavia

Olympic Games
Gold medal – first place	1984 Los Angeles	Lightweight

Vlado Lisjak (born 29 April 1962) is a former Croatian Greco-Roman wrestler who competed in the 1984 Summer Olympics for Yugoslavia. He won gold in the 68 kg category, beating Tapio Sipilä in the final. Because of his feat he won the Croatian Sportsman of the Year award in 1984.

Lisjak retired from competitive wrestling in 1993 and has since worked as coach and director of the Croatian national wrestling team.
