= Kaygusuz =

Kaygusuz is a Turkish surname. Notable people with the surname include:

- Kaygusuz Abdal (1341–1444), Turkish folk poet of the 14th century
- Selman Kaygusuz (born 1963), Turkish wrestler
- Sema Kaygusuz (born 1972), Turkish novelist, playwright, essayist, and short story writer
