= Lars Lagerborg =

Swedish wrestler

Personal information
- Nationality: Swedish
- Born: 27 March 1967 (age 59) Varberg, Sweden

Sport
- Sport: Wrestling

Lars Lagerborg (born 27 March 1967) is a Swedish wrestler. He competed in the men's Greco-Roman 68 kg at the 1988 Summer Olympics.
