= Gian Singh (wrestler) =

Indian wrestler

Personal information
- Nationality: Indian
- Born: 2 July 1959 (age 67)

Sport
- Sport: Wrestling

Gian Singh (born 2 July 1959) is an Indian wrestler. He competed in the men's freestyle 62 kg at the 1984 Summer Olympics.
