= Hussain El-Din Hamed =

Egyptian wrestler

Personal information
- Nationality: Egyptian
- Born: 17 September 1963 (age 62)

Sport
- Sport: Wrestling

Hussain El-Din Hamed (born 17 September 1963) is an Egyptian wrestler. He competed in the men's freestyle 68 kg at the 1984 Summer Olympics.
