= Jerzy Kopański =

Polish wrestler

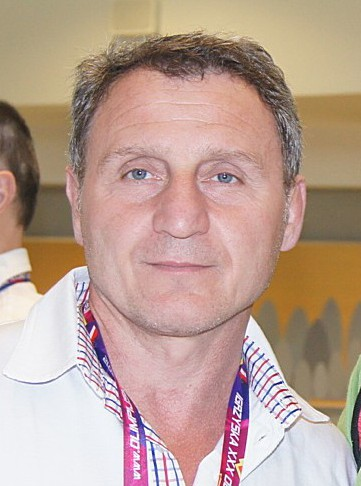
- Jerzy Kopanski in 2012

Personal information
- Nationality: Polish
- Born: 8 April 1957 (age 69) Katowice, Poland

Sport
- Sport: Wrestling

Jerzy Kopański (born 8 April 1957) is a Polish wrestler. He competed in the men's Greco-Roman 68 kg at the 1988 Summer Olympics.
