= Satyawan (wrestler) =

Indian wrestler

Personal information
- Nationality: Indian
- Born: 25 November 1964 (age 61)

Sport
- Sport: Wrestling

Satyawan (born 25 November 1964) is an Indian wrestler. He competed in the men's freestyle 68 kg at the 1988 Summer Olympics.
