= Jan Trussell =

Judoka

Jan Trussell (Janet Trussell) is a former competitor in judo, freestyle wrestling and sambo. She won the US National Championships in sambo. Trussell also won the US National Championship in judo. She accomplished this at the age of 18. She is a multiple time winner in the World Sambo Championships. She is the sister of Rebecca Trussell. She qualified for the Women's Freestyle Wrestling Championship in 1989 defeating Asia DeWeese in the first U.S. international women's freestyle wrestling tournament at San Francisco. Jan is an advocate against drug use.

== Personal life ==
Jan was married to John Ross.

== See also ==
Sambo at the 1983 Pan American Games
