= Ivan Valladares =

Peruvian wrestler

Personal information
- Nationality: Peruvian
- Born: 6 May 1965 (age 61)

Sport
- Sport: Wrestling

Ivan Valladares (born 6 May 1965) is a Peruvian wrestler. He competed in the men's freestyle 68 kg at the 1984 Summer Olympics.
