= Dietmar Streitler =

Austrian wrestler (1964–2022)

Personal information
- Born: 27 April 1962
- Died: 25 June 2022 (aged 60)

Sport
- Country: Austria

Dietmar Streitler (27 April 1962 – 25 June 2022) was an Austrian wrestler who competed in the 1984 Summer Olympics. Streitler took fifth place in the men's Greco-Roman 68 kg weight class, finishing third in his group before defeating Mohamed Al-Nakdali of Syria in the fifth/sixth place match.

Streitler also competed at the 1983 World Championship (placing 16th in the 68 kg weight class), the 1984 European Championship (7th in the 68 kg weight class), and the 1987 World Championship (18th in the 74 kg weight class). He competed for KSK Klaus in club competition.
