= Ren Qin =

Chinese wrestler

Personal information
- Nationality: Chinese
- Born: 28 March 1962 (age 64)

Sport
- Sport: Wrestling

Ren Qin (born 28 March 1962) is a Chinese wrestler. He competed in the men's freestyle 68 kg at the 1984 Summer Olympics.
