= Cecilio Rodríguez =

Cuban wrestler (born 1968)

Personal information
- Nationality: Cuban
- Born: 15 July 1968 (age 58)

Sport
- Sport: Wrestling

Cecilio Rodríguez (born 15 July 1968) is a Cuban wrestler. He competed in the men's Greco-Roman 68 kg at the 1992 Summer Olympics.
