= Gerry Svensson =

Swedish wrestler

Personal information
- Nationality: Swedish
- Born: 29 June 1958 Bjuv, Sweden
- Died: 21 March 2005 (aged 46) Åstorp, Sweden

Sport
- Sport: Wrestling

Gerry Svensson (29 June 1958 – 21 March 2005) was a Swedish wrestler. He competed in the men's Greco-Roman 68 kg at the 1984 Summer Olympics.
