= Erwin Knosp =

German wrestler

Personal information
- Nationality: German
- Born: 26 August 1961 (age 64) Renchen, Germany

Sport
- Sport: Wrestling

Erwin Knosp (born 26 August 1961) is a German former wrestler. He competed in the men's freestyle 68 kg at the 1984 Summer Olympics.
