= Levon Julfalakyan =

Armenian wrestler (born 1964)

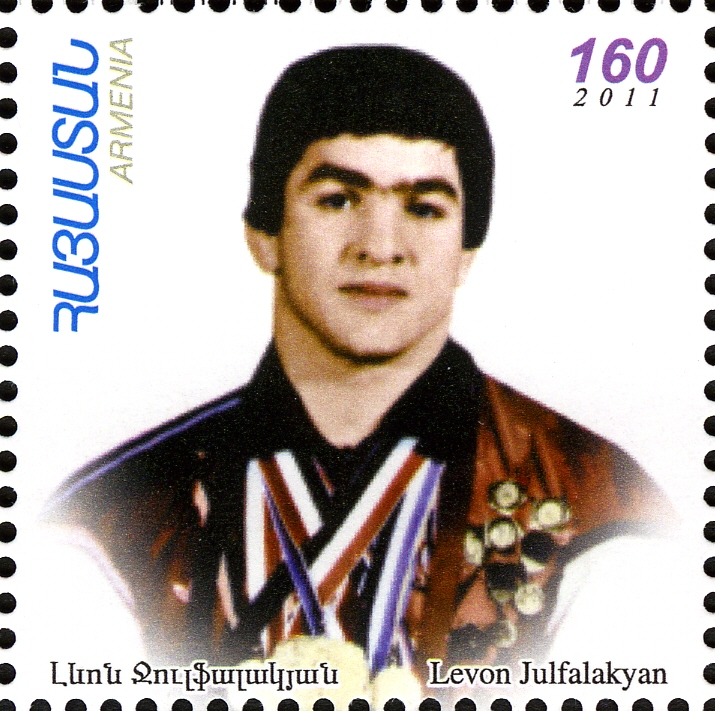
- Levon Julfalakyan on a 2011 Armenian postage stamp

Personal information
- Born: 5 April 1964 (age 62) Gyumri, Armenian SSR, Soviet Union
- Home town: Yerevan, Armenia
- Height: 1.67 m (5 ft 5 1/2 in)
- Weight: 68 kg (150 lb)

Sport
- Sport: Wrestling
- Event: Greco-Roman
- Club: CSKA Gyumri
- Coached by: Aram Sargsyan
Medal record
Representing Soviet Union
Olympic Games
Gold medal – first place	1988 Seoul	68 kg
World Championships
Gold medal – first place	1986 Budapest	68 kg
Bronze medal – third place	1989 Martigny	68 kg
European Championships
Gold medal – first place	1986 Piraeus	68 kg
World Cup
Gold medal – first place	1985 Lund	68 kg

Levon Julfalakyan (Armenian: Լեւոն Ջուլֆալակյան, born 5 April 1964) is a former Soviet Armenian Greco-Roman wrestler. He is an Olympic Champion, World Champion, and European Champion and was merited Honoured Master of Sports of the USSR in 1988. Julfalakyan is the current head coach of the Armenian national Greco-Roman wrestling team and President of the Union of Armenian Olympians, as well as a member of the executive committee of the NOC.

He competed for the Soviet Union at the 1988 Summer Olympics in Seoul where he won a gold medal in Greco-Roman wrestling, the lightweight class.

== Early life ==
Levon Julfalakyan was born in Leninakan, Armenian SSR (now Gyumri, Armenia). Coming from an athletic background, both of his parents had been gymnasts. Levon attended gymnastics sections from an early age, then started wrestling in Gyumri Youth Academy. In 1983, he won the junior championship of the USSR. He graduated from Gyumri State Pedagogical Institute (now Shirak State University).

== Career ==
Julfalakyan joined the Soviet national wrestling team in 1985 and, in that same year, won a gold medal at the Wrestling World Cup team competition. Julfalakyan later became a European Champion when he won a gold medal at the 1986 European Wrestling Championships. Four months later, Julfalakyan also became a World Champion by winning a gold medal at the 1986 World Wrestling Championships.

At the 1988 Summer Olympics in Seoul, Julfalakyan competed in the weight category of 68 kg. Julfalakyan was very dominant in all of his matches and defeated every opponent by a wide margin of points. Julfalakyan was awarded an Olympic gold medal for his victory.

A year prior to becoming an Olympic Champion, Julfalakyan came in third place at the 1989 World Wrestling Championships. He decided to retire from wrestling afterward.

After retiring from competitions Julfalakyan worked as a wrestling coach. In 1999 he became the head coach of the Armenian national Greco-Roman wrestling team and president of the Union of Armenian Olympians. In 2002 he was appointed as vice-president of the Armenian Wrestling Federation, and next year became a member of the executive committee of the NOC. Julfalakyan was also President of the Armenian Olympians Association.

== Personal life ==
Julfalakyan currently lives in Yerevan. He is married and has two sons Arsen and Aram, who are also wrestlers. His elder son Arsen Julfalakyan won an Olympic silver medal at the 2012 Summer Olympics in London for Armenia and carried the national flag at the closing ceremony.

== Awards ==
Julfalakyan was awarded the "For Merit" 1st degree medal in 2012.
