= Steven Bayliss =

British wrestler

Personal information
- Nationality: British
- Born: 5 May 1959 (age 67) London, England

Sport
- Sport: Wrestling

Steven Bayliss (born 5 May 1959) is a British wrestler. He competed in the men's freestyle 68 kg at the 1984 Summer Olympics.
