= Zouheir Hory =

Syrian wrestler

Personal information
- Nationality: Syrian
- Born: 15 March 1966 (age 60)

Sport
- Sport: Wrestling

Zouheir Hory (Arabic: زهير حوري; born 15 March 1966) is a Syrian wrestler. He competed in the men's Greco-Roman 68 kg at the 1988 Summer Olympics.
