= Zhao Jianqiang =

Chinese wrestler

Personal information
- Nationality: Chinese
- Born: 22 June 1964 (age 62)

Sport
- Sport: Wrestling

Zhao Jianqiang (born 22 June 1964) is a Chinese wrestler. He competed in the men's Greco-Roman 68 kg at the 1988 Summer Olympics.
