= Abdellatif Abdellatif =

Egyptian wrestler

Personal information
- Nationality: Egyptian
- Born: 2 June 1960 (age 66)
- Height: 1.72 m (5 ft 8 in)
- Weight: 68 kg (150 lb)

Sport
- Sport: Wrestling
- Event: Greco-Roman

Abdellatif Khalf Abdellatif (born 2 June 1960) is an Egyptian wrestler. He competed in the lightweight Greco-Roman competition at the 1988 Summer Olympics.
