= Donna C. Turk =

Sport
- Country: United States
- Sport: Judo, 6th dan Sambo
Medal record
Women's Sambo
Pan American Games
Silver medal – second place	1983 Caracas, Venezuela	44 kg

Donna C. Turk, 6th dan, is an American judoka, best known for having won the Indiana State Judo Champion in 48 kilos for 6 years. Donna took bronze medal 1981 National Judo Championships 48 kilo and bronze medal at 1981 Judo US Open 48 kilo. She also won the silver medal in the 97-pound category at the 1983 USA Pan American Sambo championships.

== Judo career ==
Turk began her judo training in Indianapolis in 1973. About six years later, she founded the USJA judo club at the community center in Indianapolis's Krannert Park. From 1981 until 1983, she was a member of the USA National Women's Team. Turk served as one of the coaches for the USA Women's International Team during the 1987 Pan American Games. The United States Judo Association promoted her to the black belt rank of Rokudan (6th dan) on 14 July 2017.
