= Aristidis Grigorakis =

Greek wrestler

Personal information
- Nationality: Greek
- Born: 12 December 1962 (age 63)

Sport
- Sport: Wrestling

Aristidis Grigorakis (born 12 December 1962) is a Greek wrestler. He competed in the men's Greco-Roman 68 kg at the 1988 Summer Olympics.
