= Andrew Rein =

American wrestler (born 1958)

Personal information
- Full name: Andrew Roland Rein
- Born: March 11, 1958 (age 68) Stoughton, Wisconsin, U.S.

Sport
- Country: United States
- Sport: Wrestling
- Events: Freestyle and Folkstyle
- College team: Wisconsin
- Club: Wisconsin Wrestling Club
- Team: USA
Medal record
Men's freestyle wrestling
Representing United States
Olympic Games
Silver medal – second place	1984 Los Angeles	68 kg
Collegiate Wrestling
Representing the Wisconsin Badgers
NCAA Division I Championships
Gold medal – first place	1980 Corvallis	150 lb
Silver medal – second place	1978 College Park	142 lb

Andrew "Andy" Roland Rein (born March 11, 1958) is an American former wrestler who competed in the 1984 Summer Olympics, for the United States. Rein was born in Stoughton, Wisconsin. In 1984, he won the silver medal in the freestyle 68 kg competition. In 2022, Rein was inducted into the National Wrestling Hall of Fame as a Distinguished Member.
