= Carmelo Flores =

Puerto Rican wrestler (born 1955)

Personal information
- Nationality: Puerto Rican
- Born: 16 December 1955 (age 70)

Sport
- Sport: Wrestling

Carmelo Flores (born 16 December 1955) is a Puerto Rican wrestler. He competed in the men's freestyle 62 kg at the 1984 Summer Olympics.
