= Islam Dugushiev =

Russian wrestler (born 1966)

Medal record

Men's Greco-Roman wrestling

Olympic Games

Representing the Unified Team
Silver medal – second place	1992 Barcelona	lightweight

World Championships

Representing Soviet Union
Gold medal – first place	1990 Ostia	lightweight
Gold medal – first place	1991 Varna	lightweight

Representing Russia
Gold medal – first place	1993 Stockholm	lightweight
Gold medal – first place	1994 Tampere	lightweight

Islam Dugushiev (born 15 April 1966) is a Russian former wrestler who competed in the 1992 Summer Olympics and in the 2000 Summer Olympics.
