= Cris Brown =

Australian freestyle wrestler

Personal information
- Born: 14 January 1963 (age 63) Melbourne, Victoria, Australia
- Height: 176 cm (5 ft 9 in)
- Weight: 79 kg (174 lb)

Sport
- Club: Victoria University, Australia
Medal record
Wrestling
Commonwealth Games
Silver medal – second place	1982 Brisbane	Featherweight

Christopher Brown is an Australian freestyle wrestler who competed at five Olympics from 1980 to 1996. His best result was fourth at the 1984 Olympics when he lost in the bronze medal match of the Featherweight class to South Korean Lee Jung-Keun.

Brown was later banned for life by an AOC panel from representing Australia in the Olympics as he twice breached their rules on doping.

Brown has participated in Submission Wrestling and MMA matches, scoring a win over Renzo Gracie in an ADCC tournament. He also fought notable Cuban fighter Hector Lombard with a no contest result due to an illegal headbutt by Lombard.

He coaches and trains at Adrenaline MMA and fitness in Cheltenham, Melbourne.
