= Angel Yassenov =

Bulgarian wrestler (born 1965)

Personal information
- Nationality: Bulgarian
- Born: 20 April 1965 (age 61) Omurtag, Bulgaria

Sport
- Sport: Wrestling

Angel Yassenov (born 20 April 1965) is a Bulgarian wrestler. He competed in the men's freestyle 68 kg at the 1988 Summer Olympics.
