= Markus Pittner =

Austrian wrestler

Personal information
- Nationality: Austrian
- Born: 2 February 1967 (age 59) Feldkirch, Austria

Sport
- Sport: Wrestling

Markus Pittner (born 2 February 1967) is an Austrian wrestler. He competed in the men's Greco-Roman 68 kg at the 1988 Summer Olympics.
