= You In-tak =

South Korean wrestler (born 1958)

Personal information
- Born: January 10, 1958 (age 68) Gimje, North Jeolla Province

Sport
- Sport: Freestyle wrestling
Medal record
Representing South Korea
Olympic Games
Gold medal – first place	1984 Los Angeles	Lightweight
Summer Universiade
Silver medal – second place	1981 Bucharest	Lightweight
Asian Games
Bronze medal – third place	1982 New Delhi	Lightweight

- You In-tak
- Hangul: 유인탁
- Hanja: 柳寅卓
- RR: Yu Intak
- MR: Yu Int'ak

You In-tak (Korean: 유인탁; born January 10, 1958) is a retired South Korean freestyle wrestler and Olympic champion.

You first garnered attention at the 1981 Summer Universiade where he won the silver medal in the freestyle wrestling 68 kg class by losing to future two-time World Champion Raúl Cascaret of Cuba in the final match.

You received a gold medal at the 1984 Summer Olympics in Los Angeles.

Later he began coaching but he quit the sport in 1999 and since has been an owner of an eatery.
