= Éric Brulon =

French wrestler

Personal information
- Nationality: French
- Born: 2 September 1960 (age 65)

Sport
- Sport: Wrestling

Éric Brulon (born 2 September 1960) is a French wrestler. He competed in the men's freestyle 68 kg at the 1984 Summer Olympics.
