= Pedro Villuela =

Spanish wrestler

Personal information
- Nationality: Spanish
- Born: 13 June 1971 (age 55) Barakaldo, Spain

Sport
- Sport: Wrestling

Pedro Villuela (born 13 June 1971) is a Spanish wrestler. He competed in the men's Greco-Roman 68 kg at the 1992 Summer Olympics.
