= Mazouz Ben Djedaa =

Algerian wrestler

Personal information
- Nationality: Algerian
- Born: 20 December 1967 (age 58)

Sport
- Sport: Wrestling

Mazouz Ben Djedaa (born 20 December 1967) is an Algerian wrestler. He competed in the men's Greco-Roman 68 kg at the 1992 Summer Olympics.
