= Leonardo Camacho =

Bolivian wrestler

Personal information
- Nationality: Bolivian
- Born: 11 February 1957 (age 69)

Sport
- Sport: Wrestling

Leonardo Camacho (born 11 February 1957) is a Bolivian wrestler. He competed in the men's freestyle 62 kg at the 1984 Summer Olympics.
