= Yasuhiro Okubo =

Japanese wrestler

Personal information
- Nationality: Japanese
- Born: 14 March 1961 (age 65)

Sport
- Sport: Wrestling

Yasuhiro Okubo (大久保 康裕, Ōkubo Yasuhiro; born 14 March 1961) is a Japanese wrestler. He competed in the men's Greco-Roman 68 kg at the 1988 Summer Olympics.
