= Masakazu Kamimura =

Japanese wrestler (born 1960)

Personal information
- Nationality: Japanese
- Born: 2 October 1960 (age 65)

Sport
- Sport: Wrestling

Masakazu Kamimura (上村政和, Kamimura Masakazu, born 2 October 1960) is a Japanese wrestler. He competed in the men's freestyle 68 kg at the 1984 Summer Olympics.
