= Randy Lewis (wrestler) =

American wrestler (born 1959)

Personal information
- Full name: Randall Scott Lewis
- Born: June 7, 1959 (age 67) Rapid City, South Dakota, U.S.

Sport
- Country: United States
- Sport: Wrestling
- Events: Freestyle; Folkstyle
- College team: Iowa
- Club: Hawkeye Wrestling Club
- Team: USA
- Coached by: Dan Gable
Medal record
Men's freestyle wrestling
Representing the United States
Olympic Games
| Gold medal – first place | 1984 Los Angeles | 62 kg |
Junior World Championships
| Gold medal – first place | 1977 Las Vegas | 57 kg |
Collegiate Wrestling
Representing the Iowa Hawkeyes
NCAA Division I Championships
| Gold medal – first place | 1979 Ames | 126 lb |
| Gold medal – first place | 1980 Corvallis | 134 lb |
| Silver medal – second place | 1978 College Park | 126 lb |
Big Ten Championships
| Gold medal – first place | 1978 Ann Arbor | 126 lb |
| Gold medal – first place | 1979 Iowa City | 126 lb |
| Gold medal – first place | 1980 East Lansing | 134 lb |
| Silver medal – second place | 1981 Madison | 134 lb |

Randall Scott Lewis (born June 7, 1959) is an American wrestler and Olympic champion. He competed at the 1984 Olympic Games in Los Angeles, where he won the gold medal in freestyle wrestling in the featherweight class. In 1998, Lewis was inducted into the National Wrestling Hall of Fame as a Distinguished Member.

== High school career ==
Lewis won three high school state wrestling titles in South Dakota. At one point in his high school career, Lewis held the national consecutive pin record, with 45 straight. He later won the Junior World (20 years old and younger) Freestyle Championship.

== College and Senior level career ==
In college, Lewis became a four-time All-American and two-time NCAA champion at the University of Iowa. He was a two-time Olympian, in both 1980 and 1984. President Jimmy Carter's boycott prevented the U.S. team from traveling to the 1980 Olympic Games held in Moscow, Russia.

At the 1984 Olympic Games, Lewis won the gold medal at the 62 kg weight division in freestyle wrestling, outscoring his first four opponents 52-4 to advance to the final, where he defeated Japan's Kosei Akaishi 24-11 in 4:52. He was second in the 1988 U.S. Olympic trials to John Smith, losing out in a best of three series. Smith went on to capture Olympic gold in both the 1988 and 1992 Games.
