= Marthin Kornbakk =

Swedish wrestler

Personal information
- Nationality: Swedish
- Born: 13 February 1964 (age 62) Gothenburg, Sweden

Sport
- Sport: Wrestling

Marthin Kornbakk (born 13 February 1964) is a Swedish wrestler. He competed in the men's Greco-Roman 68 kg at the 1992 Summer Olympics.
