= Attila Podolszki =

Hungarian wrestler

Personal information
- Nationality: Hungarian
- Born: 9 October 1964 (age 61) Budapest, Hungary

Sport
- Sport: Wrestling

Attila Podolszki (born 9 October 1964) is a Hungarian wrestler. He competed in the men's freestyle 68 kg at the 1988 Summer Olympics.
