= Georgi Karamanliev =

Bulgarian wrestler

Personal information
- Nationality: Bulgarian
- Born: 6 October 1961 (age 64) Topolovgrad, Bulgaria

Sport
- Sport: Wrestling

Georgi Karamanliev (born 6 October 1961) is a Bulgarian wrestler. He competed in the men's Greco-Roman 68 kg at the 1988 Summer Olympics.
