= Takumi Mori =

Japanese wrestler (born 1963)

Personal information
- Nationality: Japanese
- Born: 5 October 1963 (age 62) Tokushima, Japan

Sport
- Sport: Wrestling

Takumi Mori (born 5 October 1963) is a Japanese wrestler. He competed in the men's Greco-Roman 68 kg at the 1992 Summer Olympics.
