= Rebecca Trussell =

Rebecca "Becky" Scott, née Trussell, is an American retired martial arts athlete who competed in sambo and judo. She is a US National Championships Bronze Medalist in judo. At the time, this was the highest level of competition as there was no world championship. She eventually became a team alternate for the first Judo World Championship for women. Scott competed at 149lbs. Scott competed at the Sambo at the 1983 Pan American Games Scott was a five-time National Champion in sombo. She additionally won the 1984 AAU National Women's Sombo championships. She later competed in the Sambo at the 1983 Pan American Games. It was here that she initially won the title. She also served as the coach for the Judo Junior National Team for the United States.

She is the sister of Jan Trussell. and is married to Steve Scott. She currently works as a referee at Freestyle Judo Tournaments.
