= Andrzej Kubiak =

Polish wrestler

Personal information
- Nationality: Polish
- Born: 25 January 1967 (age 59) Łódź, Poland

Sport
- Sport: Wrestling

Andrzej Kubiak (born 25 January 1967) is a Polish wrestler. He competed in the men's freestyle 68 kg at the 1988 Summer Olympics.
