= Shaban Ibrahim =

Egyptian wrestler

Personal information
- Nationality: Egyptian
- Born: 1 September 1957 (age 68)

Sport
- Sport: Wrestling

Shaban Ibrahim (born 1 September 1957) is an Egyptian wrestler. He competed in the men's Greco-Roman 68 kg at the 1984 Summer Olympics.
