= Martin Herbster =

German wrestler (1962–2024)

Personal information
- Nationality: German
- Born: 29 January 1962 Karlsruhe, Germany
- Died: 2 March 2024 (aged 62)

Sport
- Sport: Wrestling

Martin Herbster (29 January 1962 – 2 March 2024) was a German wrestler. He competed in the men's freestyle 62 kg at the 1984 Summer Olympics. Herbster died in March 2024, at the age of 62.

== Career ==
Herbster qualified for wrestling at the 1984 Summer Olympics by placing highly at the European Wrestling Championships.

== Personal life ==
Herbster was from Graben-Neudorf and he started wrestling at six years old, quickly becoming German student, youth, and junior champion four times each. He worked as a chemical technician, and as a laboratory assistant he helped produce paint.
