= Antonio La Bruna =

Italian wrestler

Personal information
- Nationality: Italian
- Born: 28 December 1959 (age 66) Livorno, Italy

Sport
- Sport: Wrestling

Antonio La Bruna (born 28 December 1959) is an Italian wrestler. He competed at the 1980 Summer Olympics and the 1984 Summer Olympics, where he lost to eventual Olympic champion Randy Lewis. He was also previously an Italian sambo champion.

He is presently a coach for the Livorno Wrestling Group.
