= Manuel Linares =

Spanish astronomer and astrophysicist (born 1980)

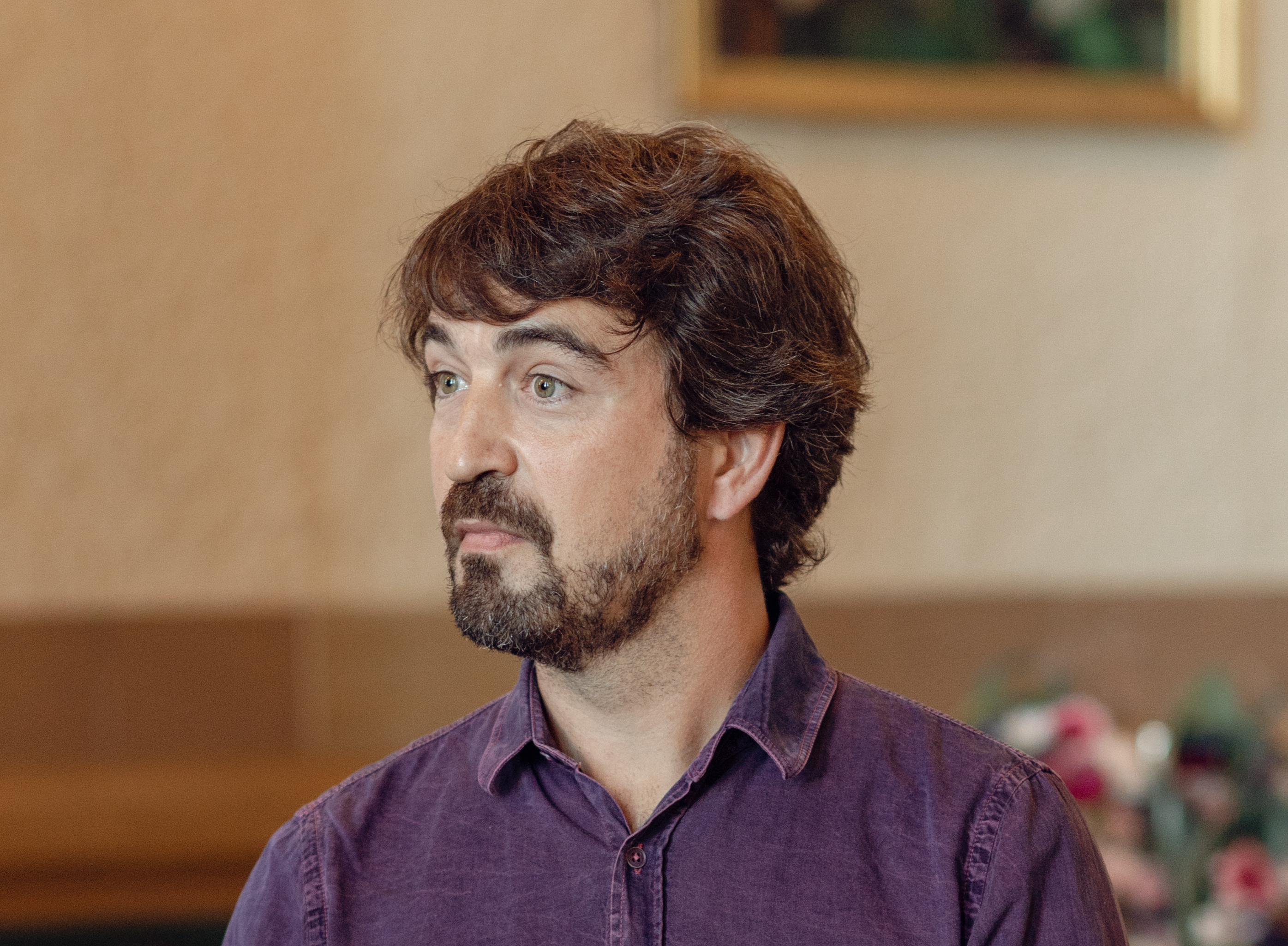
- Linares in 2022
- Born: 14 October 1980 (age 45); Barcelona
- Occupation: Professor at the Department of Physics at the Norwegian University of Science and Technology (NTNU)

Manuel Linares Alegret (born 1980) is a Spanish researcher. He is an astronomer and astrophysicist, with a specialty in high-energy astrophysics. His primary focus is on compact objects in binary systems, neutron stars and accretion streams. In 2018, he and his research group discovered the most massive neutron star that had been measured until then. It has 2.3 times the mass of the sun.

He has received several grants and awards for his research. In 2020 he was awarded the ERC Consolidator Grant. He is a professor at Norwegian University of Science and Technology (NTNU), Department of Physics.

== Education and career ==
Linares has a B.Sc. in physics and an M.Sc. in astrophysics from the University of Barcelona.

In 2009, he obtained a PhD degree at the University of Amsterdam with his thesis on Accretion states and thermonuclear bursts in neutron star X-ray binaries.

He was employed at the Massachusetts Institute of Technology as a Rubicon Fellow in the period 2009–2012.

Linares was an «IAC Fellow» at the Instituto de Astrofísica de Canarias in Tenerife from 2012 to 2017. He was then employed at the Polytechnic University of Catalonia, first as a Marie Curie Fellow (2017–2018), then as an associate professor (2018–).

In 2021, Linares was hired as a professor in the Department of Physics at the Norwegian University of Science and Technology (NTNU).

His projects include leading an ERC Consolidator Grant project where he and his research group study neutron stars. The goal is to find the most massive neutron stars and understand more about the binary systems that surround them.

== Publications ==
- Manuel Linares publications indexed by Google Scholar
- List of publications by Manuel Linares in BIBSYS (Norway)
- List of publications by Manuel Linares in CRIStin (The Norwegian Scientific Index)
- Manuel Linares in Virtual International Authority File

== Prizes and honours ==
- 1998 – silver medal in the National Spanish Physics Olympiad
- 2004 – Scholarship for outstanding undergraduate students, to initiate scientific research. Awarded by the Spanish Ministry of Education
- 2008–2009 one of the three best Ph.D. theses in this period, selected by the Spanish astronomy association Sociedad Española de Astronomía
- 2009 –«Rubicon award», grant awarded by the Netherlands Organization for Scientific Research, physics division. Linares spent the scholarship period at the MIT Kavli Institute for Astrophysics and Space Research.
- 2016 – Marie Curie Individual Fellowship, Reintegration Panel. Awarded by the EU through the Horizon 2020 programme
- 2020 – ERC Consolidator Grant, Universe Sciences Panel. Awarded by the EU through Horizon 2020

== Professional memberships ==
- 2011–2012 Member of AAS (American Astronomical Society)
- 2012–2015 Murchison Widefield Array (MWA) collaboration
- 2015– Athena Science Working Group 3.3
- 2018– Member of EAS (European Astronomical Society)
- 2021– member of the IAU (International Astronomical Union)
  - member of Division D High Energy Phenomena and Fundamental Physics
  - member of Division G Stars and Stellar Physics
