= Amar Wattar =

Syrian wrestler

Personal information
- Nationality: Syrian
- Born: 25 January 1967 (age 59)

Sport
- Sport: Wrestling

Amar Wattar (Arabic: عمار وتار; born 25 January 1967) is a Syrian wrestler. He competed in the men's freestyle 68 kg at the 1988 Summer Olympics.
