= José Inagaki =

Peruvian wrestler (born 1965)

Personal information
- Nationality: Peruvian
- Born: 16 December 1965 (age 60)

Sport
- Sport: Wrestling

José Inagaki (born 16 December 1965) is a Peruvian wrestler. He competed in the men's freestyle 62 kg at the 1984 Summer Olympics.
