= Juan Caride =

Spanish wrestler

Personal information
- Nationality: Spanish
- Born: 13 December 1965 (age 60)

Sport
- Sport: Wrestling

Juan Caride (born 13 December 1965) is a Spanish wrestler. He competed in the men's freestyle 68 kg at the 1988 Summer Olympics.
