= Seiji Nemoto =

Japanese wrestler

Seiji Nemoto (根本 誠次, Nemoto Seiji, born 16 September 1961) is a Japanese former wrestler who competed in the 1984 Summer Olympics.
