= Katherine Horny =

Peruvian volleyball player

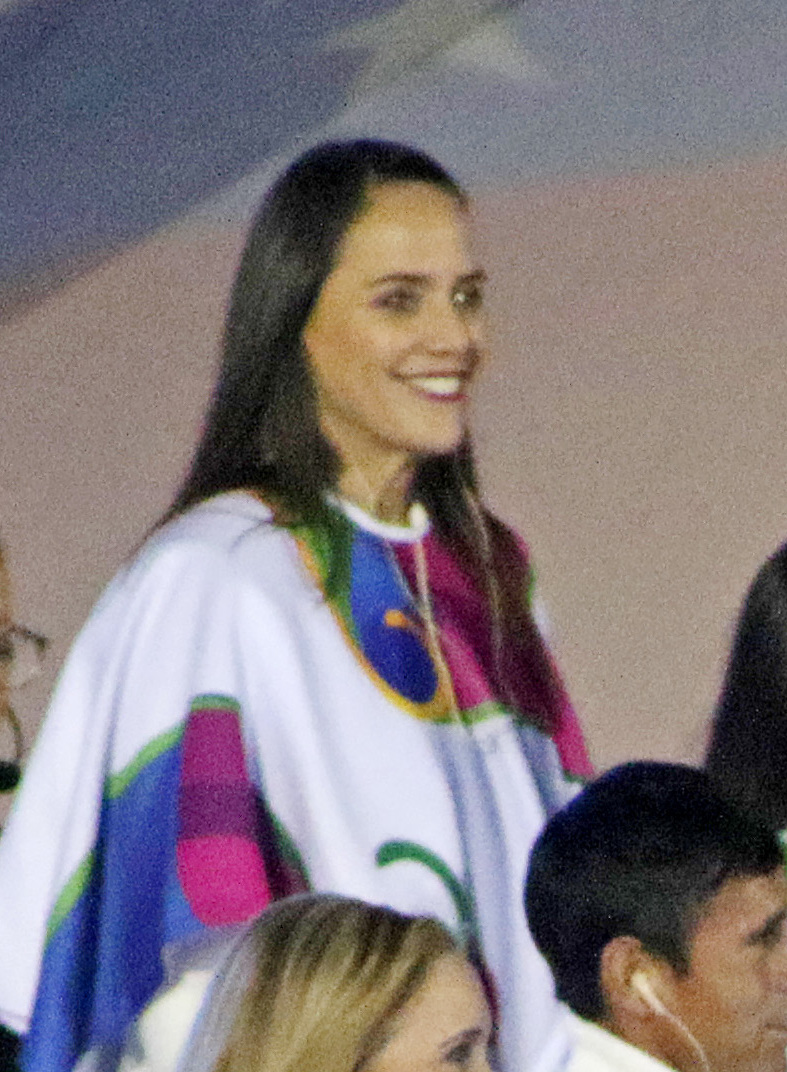
- Katherine Horny

Personal information
- Full name: Katherine Xenia Horny Sebastiani
- Nickname: Kathy
- Born: 11 November 1969 (age 56); Lima, Peru
- Height: 1.86 m (6 ft 1 in)

Volleyball information
- Position: Middle blocker
- Number: 1

National team
1987–1988	Peru
Honours
Women's volleyball
Representing Peru
Olympic Games
Silver medal – second place	1988 Seoul	Team
CSV South American Championship
Gold medal – first place	1987 Punta del Este

Katherine Horny (born 11 November 1969) is a former volleyball player from Peru who played for the Peruvian women's national volleyball team. She won a silver medal at the 1988 Seoul Summer Olympics in Seoul. She was a middle blocker.
