= Dean-Carlos Manibog =

Filipino wrestler

Dean-Carlo Manibog
Personal information
- Nationality: Filipino
- Born: 28 June 1968 (age 58)
- Parent: Monty Manibog (father)

Sport
- Sport: Wrestling

Dean-Carlos Manibog (born 28 June 1968) is a Filipino wrestler. He competed in the men's freestyle 68 kg at the 1988 Summer Olympics.
