= Lee Jung-keun =

South Korean freestyle wrestler

Personal information
- Born: 29 July 1960 (age 65)

Korean name
- Hangul: 이정근
- RR: I Jeonggeun
- MR: I Chŏnggŭn
Medal record
Men's freestyle wrestling
Representing South Korea
Olympic Games
| Bronze medal – third place | 1984 Los Angeles | 62 kg |
Asian Games
| Gold medal – first place | 1986 Seoul | 62 kg |
| Silver medal – second place | 1982 Delhi | 62 kg |

Lee Jung-keun (Korean: 이정근; born 29 July 1960) is a South Korean former wrestler who competed in the 1984 Summer Olympics.
