= Mohammad Shir =

Afghan wrestler

- Born: 1942 (age 82–83)

Professional wrestling career
- Billed weight: Lightweight

Mohammad Shir (born 1942) is a former Afghan wrestler who competed in the lightweight event at the 1988 Summer Olympic Games.
