= Abdullah Al-Shamsi =

Yemeni wrestler

Abdullah Al-Shamsi (born 25 November 1967) is a former wrestler, who represented North Yemen at the 1988 Summer Olympic Games in the men's Greco-Roman 68kg class. He lost his first two bouts and was eliminated.
