= Rodney Smith (wrestler) =

American Olympic wrestler

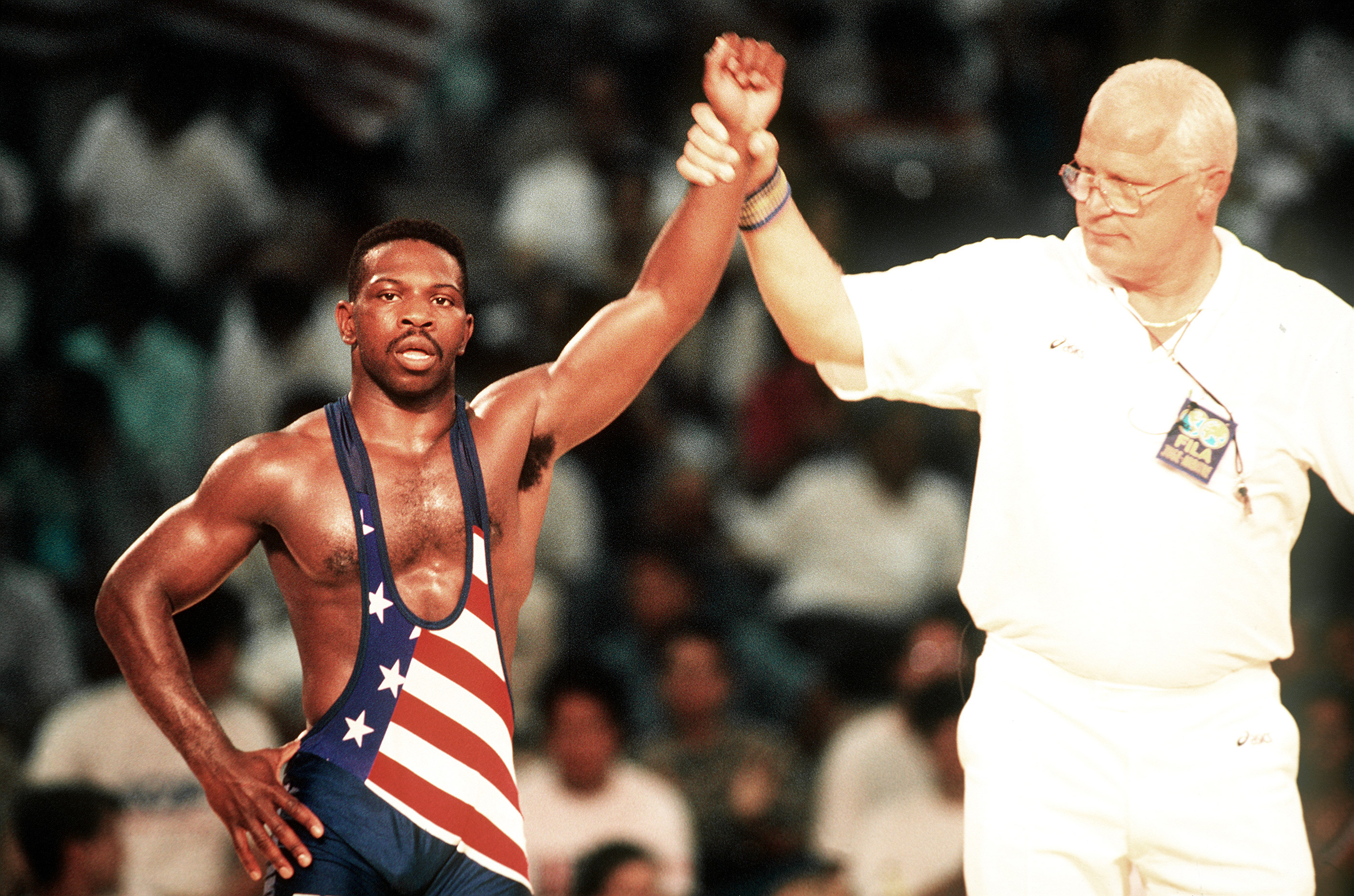
- Smith at the 1992 Summer Olympics

Personal information
- Full name: Rodney Stacey Smith
- Born: April 13, 1966 (age 60) Washington, D.C., U.S.
- Home town: Springfield, Massachusetts, U.S.

Sport
- Country: United States
- Sport: Wrestling
- Events: Greco-Roman and Folkstyle
- College team: Western New England
- Club: U.S. Army
- Team: USA
Medal record
Men's Greco-Roman wrestling
Representing the United States
Olympic Games
Bronze medal – third place	1992 Barcelona	68 kg

Rodney Stacey Smith (born April 13, 1966) is an American wrestler. He was born in Washington, D.C. and grew up in Springfield, Massachusetts. Smith attended Western New England University. Coached by head coach Robert Skelton and Assistant Coach Bryon Gross, Smith was a two-time NCAA Division III All-American. After Smith graduated in 1988, he enlisted in the United States Army. He participated in the World Class Athlete Program. He won the bronze medal in Greco-Roman wrestling at the 1992 Summer Olympics. Smith is now working at HCSS (Hampden Charter School of Science) in West Springfield.
