= Tapio Sipilä =

Finnish Olympic wrestler (born 1958)

Personal information
- Born: November 26, 1958 (age 67)
Medal record
Men's Greco-Roman wrestling
Representing Finland
Olympic Games
Silver medal – second place	1984 Los Angeles	Lightweight
Bronze medal – third place	1988 Seoul	Lightweight
World Championships
Gold medal – first place	1983 Kiev	Lightweight
Silver medal – second place	1981 Oslo	Lightweight
Silver medal – second place	1986 Budapest	Lightweight

Tapio Olavi Sipilä (born November 26, 1958, in Kiiminki), nicknamed Tapsa, is a former wrestler from Finland, who claimed the silver medal in the Men's Greco-Roman Lightweight Division (– 68 kg) at the 1984 Summer Olympics in Los Angeles. He won the bronze medal four years later in the same weight division at the 1988 Summer Olympics in Seoul, South Korea.

== Results ==
- 1980 European Championship — 68.0 kg Greco-Roman (3rd)
- 1981 European Championship — 68.0 kg Greco-Roman (3rd)
- 1981 World Championship — 68.0 kg Greco-Roman (2nd)
- 1983 European Championship — 68.0 kg Greco-Roman (3rd)
- 1983 World Championship — 68.0 kg Greco-Roman (1st)
- 1986 European Championship — 68.0 kg Greco-Roman (6th)
- 1986 World Championship — 68.0 kg Greco-Roman (2nd)
- 1987 European Championship — 68.0 kg Greco-Roman (3rd)
- 1988 European Championship — 68.0 kg Greco-Roman (4th)
