= Kim Sung-moon =

South Korean wrestler (born 1965)

Personal information
- Born: 16 March 1965 (age 61)

Korean name
- Hangul: 김성문
- RR: Gim Seongmun
- MR: Kim Sŏngmun
Medal record
Men's Greco-Roman wrestling
Representing South Korea
Olympic Games
| Silver medal – second place | 1988 Seoul | 68 kg |

Kim Sung-moon (born 16 March 1965) is a South Korean former wrestler who competed in the 1988 Summer Olympics and in the 1992 Summer Olympics.
