= Franck Abrial =

French wrestler

Personal information
- Nationality: French
- Born: 18 March 1964 (age 61); Lyon, France
- Height: 1.74 m (5 ft 9 in)
- Weight: 68 kg (150 lb)

Sport
- Sport: Wrestling

Franck Abrial (born 18 March 1964) is a French wrestler. He competed in the 1988 Summer Olympics.
