= Monty Manibog =

Filipino wrestler and mayor (1930–2016)

- circa 1978

Personal details
- Born: Gonzalo Montilla Manibog Jr. 14 February 1930 Laoag, Ilocos Norte, Philippines
- Died: 12 August 2016 (aged 86) Los Angeles, California, United States
- Resting place: Resurrection Cemetery, Montebello, California
- Spouse: Jean (née Gingerich)
- Children: 6
- Education: University of the Philippines; Loyola University

Military service
- Allegiance: United States
- Branch/service: United States Army
- Sports career
- National team: Philippines at the 1952 Summer Olympics
- Sport: Wrestling

Sports achievements and titles
- National finals: (Philippines) Gymnastics, Wrestling

Mayor of Monterey Park, California
- In office 1976–1988

Gonzalo Montilla Manibog Jr. (14 February 1930 – 12 August 2016), better known as Monty Manibog, was a Filipino athlete who competed as a wrestler in the 1952 Summer Olympics. He later emigrated to the United States, served in the United States Army, became a lawyer in California, and was elected as a city council member for Monterey Park, California. He would go on to be the city's mayor.

== Early life ==
Gonzalo Montilla Manibog Jr. was born in Laoag, Ilocos Norte on 14 February 1930. He is the son of Gonzalo Manibog, who was the first Filipino American to receive a law degree, earning it in 1917. He was raised in Hawaii. He went on to attend the University of the Philippines.

=== Sports career ===
In the 1950s, Manibog earned two gold medals at the Philippines national championships in the sports of gymnastics and wrestling; for two years he was the "athlete of the year" at the University of the Philippines. He competed in the men's freestyle featherweight at the 1952 Summer Olympics. During the 1984 Summer Olympics he was an ambassador to Southeast Asia nations at the games. In the 1990s he competed at Senior Olympics in California.

== Professional and personal life ==
Manibog served in the United States Army from 1953 to 1955; he was stationed in Tokyo where he was assigned to a psychological warfare unit. He graduated from Loyola Law School. In 1961, he passed the California Bar Exam. In the 1960s and 1970s he was a professor at Van Norman University in Los Angeles, teaching law. He also practiced law; his law firm's office was located in the Temple-Beverly area. Manibog was a proponent of the concept of a Chinatown-like Filipino Town in Los Angeles, purchasing a building on the street his law firm's office was located in.

He was involved in various civic organizations, including the Cub Scouts, and organizing Philippine-American Friendship Day events. He was the legal counsel of the Filipino Community of Los Angeles; in this position he was involved in assisting with naturalization procedures. He was one of twenty Filipino Americans honored by Representative Matthew G. Martínez in 1990. The American Bar Association awarded Manibog a distinguished service award. He died at Cedars-Sinai Hospital on 12 August 2016, at the age of 86. He was married to Jean Gingerich, and had six children. (Note: A son, going by the name of Monty Torres, became a news anchor at KMPH. A daughter, Lisa Manibog Lew Brennan, won the Binibining Pilipinas crown in 1982. A grand-daughter, Danae Manibog-Gatewood, succeeded in getting on the Philippines National Track and Field Team.) A son, Dean-Carlos Manibog, was on the Philippine Olympic team during the 1988 Summer Olympics.

=== Political career ===
In 1972, Manibog was first elected as a city council member for Monterey Park. He became the first Filipino American to become an elected official in Southern California when he was elected to Monterey Park City Council; remaining on the city council until 1988, he served as the city's mayor several times. (Note: Lisa Lew, his daughter, claims that her father was the first Filipino elected in the Continental United States.) In the 1974 election, Manibog received the fifth most votes out of eight candidates for one of the three city council seats; in his candidacy statement he wrote that he was an advisor to California's 29th congressional district.

He was elected as the city's mayor in 1976; he won the mayoral race with a majority of the vote. Manibog served three terms as Monterey Park's mayor. During his time as mayor, he kept the city's budget balanced; in part to his efforts Monterey Park earned the All-America City Award in 1985. He described himself as a moderate to conservative Democrat. In 1982, Manibog made an attempt to run for California's 59th State Assembly district, receiving third place in the Democratic primary behind Charles Calderon, and Joseph Montoya's senatorial aide Mike Duffy. In 1993, the Los Angeles Times described Manibog as a "pioneer in Southern California Filipino-American politics." In 2001, Manibog unsuccessfully ran for city treasurer of Monterey Park.

In the 2003 California gubernatorial recall election, Manibog was a write-in candidate; by running he became the first Filipino gubernatorial candidate in the mainland United States. Calling his campaign "quixotic", he challenged Arnold Schwarzenegger to a debate and a charitable wrestling match. He received eleven votes (ten from Los Angeles County, and one from Orange County) out of the more than five million votes cast during the election.

In 2026, Manibog was recognized in the 2026 resolution for Filipino American History Month in the California State Senate, introduced by California State Senator Christopher Cabaldon.
