= Antonios Papadopoulos (wrestler) =

Greek wrestler

Personal information
- Nationality: Greek
- Born: 1 February 1964 (age 62)

Sport
- Sport: Wrestling

Antonios Papadopoulos (born 1 February 1964) is a Greek wrestler. He competed in the men's Greco-Roman 68 kg at the 1984 Summer Olympics.
