= Mohamed El-Khodary =

Egyptian wrestler

Personal information
- Nationality: Egyptian
- Born: 22 November 2007 (age 18)

Sport
- Sport: Wrestling

Mohamed El-Khodary (born 22 November 2007) is an Egyptian wrestler. He competed in the men's freestyle 68 kg at the 2022 Summer Olympics.
