= Lee Yeun-ik =

South Korean wrestler

Lee Yeun-Ik (born 11 July 1960) is a Korean former wrestler who competed in the 1984 Summer Olympics.
