= Alexander Zammit =

Maltese wrestler

Personal information
- Nationality: Maltese
- Born: 3 March 1962 (age 63)

Sport
- Sport: Wrestling

Alexander Zammit (born 3 March 1962) is a former Maltese wrestler. He competed in the men's freestyle 74 kg category at the 1982 Commonwealth Games in Brisbane, in the men's freestyle 74 kg category at the 1983 Mediterranean Games in Casablanca and participated in the men's freestyle 68 kg category at the 1984 Summer Olympics.
