= Morten Brekke =

Norwegian wrestler

Personal information
- Born: 30 November 1957 (age 67)

Sport
- Country: Norway
- Sport: Amateur wrestling

Morten Brekke (born 30 November 1957) is a Norwegian former wrestler who competed in the 1984 Summer Olympics and in the 1988 Summer Olympics. He represented the club IF Urædd. He has been wrestling since he was a kid, and he is therefore very dedicated as both wrestling and coach. He has also received numerous prizes. Norwegian Championship: 10 Gold, 4 Silver and 2 Bronze. Nordic Championship: 4 Gold

He has also participated 7 European Championships, 6 World Championships and 2 Olympic Games. His best result is probably 4th place at the World Championship in Budapest in 1986. He was also extraordinary in the Olympic games in 1988 in Seoul. He had four wins, and ended at a respectable 7th place. He has been a coach ever since.

He started wrestling at the age of 13, at the Herøya Wrestlingteam, along with a friend of him. He had been doing several other sports earlier, like football and skijumping. As a fifteen-year-old boy, he realized how much wrestling fascinated him, and he decided to go for wrestling. He has now, after a long period of remarkable wrestling, become head coach for the Norwegian Wrestling Team. Besides wrestling, he spends a lot of time with his family and his other job as a Police Officer in the Skien Police Department. He hopes to continue to work with wrestling in 10 years, because wrestling will always be his passion. For Morten, it is incredibly rewarding to help the wrestlers succeed in such a tough sport.
