= Attila Repka =

Hungarian wrestler (born 1968)

Medal record

Men's Greco-Roman wrestling

Representing Hungary

Olympic Games
Gold medal – first place	1992 Barcelona	68 kg

Attila Repka (born January 10, 1968, in Miskolc) is a Hungarian wrestler and Olympic champion in Greco-Roman wrestling.

== Olympics ==
Repka competed at the 1992 Summer Olympics in Barcelona where he won a gold medal in Greco-Roman wrestling, in the lightweight class.
