= Rolando Marchinares =

Peruvian weightlifter

Personal information
- Nationality: Peruvian
- Born: 22 November 1966 (age 58)

Sport
- Sport: Weightlifting

Rolando Marchinares (born 22 November 1966) is a Peruvian weightlifter. He competed at the 1988 Summer Olympics and the 1992 Summer Olympics.
