= Francisco Barcia =

Spanish wrestler (born 1966)

Personal information
- Nationality: Spanish
- Born: 22 February 1966 (age 59); Heusden, Belgium

Sport
- Sport: Wrestling

Francisco Barcia (born 22 February 1966) is a Spanish wrestler. He competed at the 1988 Summer Olympics and the 1992 Summer Olympics.
