= Jukka Rauhala =

Finnish wrestler (born 1959)

Personal information
- Born: March 1, 1959 (age 67)
Medal record
Men's Freestyle Wrestling
Olympic Games
Bronze medal – third place	1984 Los Angeles	Lightweight

Jukka Matti Rauhala (born March 1, 1959, in Muurame) is a former wrestler from Finland, who claimed the bronze medal in the Men's Freestyle Lightweight Division (– 68 kg) at the 1984 Summer Olympics in Los Angeles.

He's married to Jaana, with whom he has son Jaakko and daughter Johanna.

On 18 March 2013 he was chosen to European Council of Associated Wrestling board of directors.

== Results ==
- 1980 European Championship — 62.0 kg Freestyle (11th)
- 1981 European Championship — 68.0 kg Freestyle (4th)
- 1982 European Championship — 68.0 kg Freestyle (5th)
- 1983 World Championship — 68.0 kg Freestyle (10th)
- 1986 European Championship — 68.0 kg Freestyle (4th)
- 1986 World Championship — 68.0 kg Freestyle (5th)
- 1987 European Championship — 68.0 kg Freestyle (4th)
- 1987 World Championship — 68.0 kg Freestyle (11th)
- 1988 European Championship — 68.0 kg Freestyle (14th)
