= Park Jang-soon =

South Korean freestyle wrestler

Personal information
- Born: April 10, 1968 (age 58) Boryeong, South Korea

Korean name
- Hangul: 박장순
- Hanja: 朴章洵
- RR: Bak Jangsun
- MR: Pak Changsun
Medal record
Men's freestyle wrestling
Representing South Korea
Olympic Games
Gold medal – first place	1992 Barcelona	74 kg
Silver medal – second place	1996 Atlanta	74 kg
Silver medal – second place	1988 Seoul	68 kg
World Championships
Gold medal – first place	1993 Toronto	74 kg

Park Jang-Soon (Korean: 박장순; born April 10, 1968) is a retired South Korean freestyle wrestler, world champion and Olympic champion.

== Olympics ==
He received a silver medal at the 1988 Summer Olympics in Seoul. He won a gold medal at the 1992 Summer Olympics in Barcelona. At the 1996 Summer Olympics in Atlanta he received a silver medal.

== World championships ==
Park won a gold medal at the 1993 FILA Wrestling World Championships in Toronto, defeating former Olympic and world champion Dave Schultz in the final match. He became the first South Korean wrestler to win both a wrestling world championship and an Olympic gold medal.
