= Alejandra de la Guerra =

Peruvian volleyball player

Personal information
- Full name: Alejandra de la Guerra
- Nationality: Peruvian
- Born: 14 February 1968 (age 58)
- Height: 1.73 m (5 ft 8 in)

Volleyball information
- Number: 10

National team
1987–1988	Peru
Honours
Women's volleyball
Representing Peru
Olympic Games
Silver medal – second place	1988 Seoul	Team
Pan American Games
Silver medal – second place	1987 Indianapolis	Team

Alejandra de la Guerra (born 14 February 1968) is a Peruvian former volleyball player who won the silver medal with the Peruvian women's national volleyball team at the 1988 Summer Olympics in Seoul. De la Guerra also helped the Peruvian team to the silver medal at the 1987 Pan American Games in Indianapolis, Indiana.
