= Nandor Sabo =

Yugoslav wrestler (born 1960)

Medal record

Representing Yugoslavia

Men's Wrestling

World Championships
Silver medal – second place	1987 Clermont-Ferrand	Lightweight

Mediterranean Games
Gold medal – first place	1997 Bari	69kg
Silver medal – second place	1991 Athens	69kg

Nandor Sabo Paloc (February 19, 1960) is a former wrestler who competed in the 1988 Summer Olympics for Yugoslavia and in the 1992 Summer Olympics as an Independent Olympic participant.
