= Selman Kaygusuz =

Turkish wrestler

Personal information
- Nationality: Turkish
- Born: 1 March 1963 (age 62); Istanbul, Turkey

Sport
- Sport: Wrestling

Selman Kaygusuz (born 1 March 1963) is a Turkish wrestler. He competed at the 1984 Summer Olympics and the 1988 Summer Olympics.
