= Kiptoo Salbei =

Kenyan wrestler

Personal information
- Nationality: Kenyan
- Born: 1 December 1963 (age 61)

Sport
- Sport: Wrestling

Kiptoo Salbei (born 1 December 1963) is a Kenyan wrestler. He competed in two events at the 1988 Summer Olympics.
