= Georgios Athanasiadis (wrestler) =

Greek wrestler

Personal information
- Nationality: Greek
- Born: 5 June 1962 (age 62); Tashkent, Uzbekistan

Sport
- Sport: Wrestling

Georgios Athanasiadis (born 5 June 1962) is a Greek wrestler. He competed at the 1984 Summer Olympics, the 1988 Summer Olympics and the 1992 Summer Olympics.
