= Sümer Koçak =

Turkish wrestler (1961–2020)

Sümer Koçak (21 September 1961 – 5 August 2020) was a Turkish wrestler who competed in the 1984 Summer Olympics and in the 1988 Summer Olympics.

== Biography ==
Koçak was born in Gülabi village, Yerköy, Yozgat, in 1961. He competed in the 1984 Summer Olympics and in the 1988 Summer Olympics.

Koçak died in Konya on 5 August 2020 and was buried there.
