= Stoyan Stoyanov (wrestler) =

Bulgarian wrestler

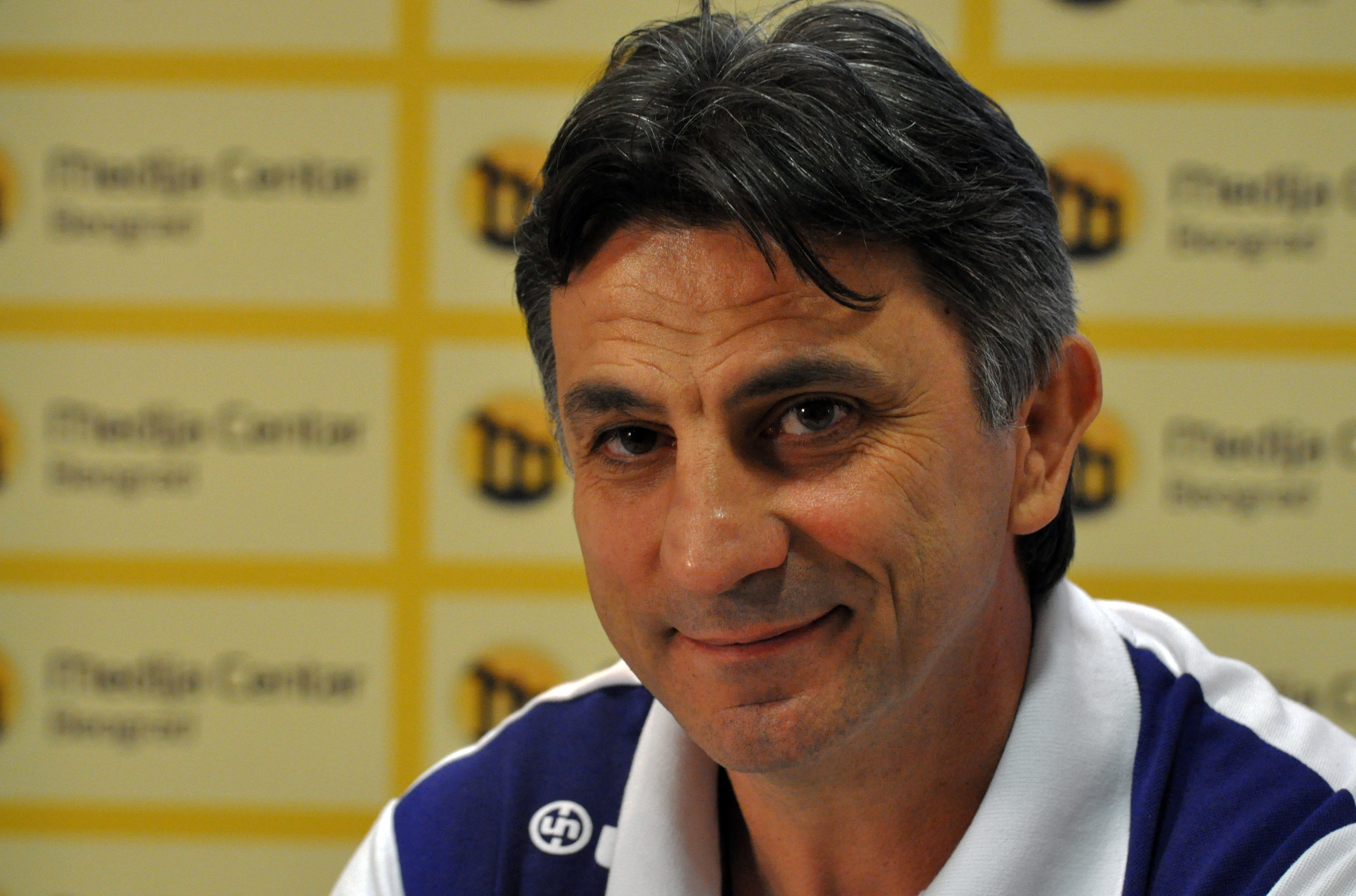

Personal information
- Nationality: Bulgarian
- Born: 12 November 1968 (age 56); Nova Zagora, Bulgaria

Sport
- Sport: Wrestling

Stoyan Stoyanov (born 12 November 1968) is a Bulgarian wrestler. He competed at the 1992 Summer Olympics and the 1996 Summer Olympics.
