= David McKay (wrestler) =

Canadian wrestler (born 1960)

David McKay (born 1 March 1960 in Winnipeg) is a Canadian former wrestler who competed in the 1984 Summer Olympics and in the 1988 Summer Olympics.
