= Herminio Hidalgo =

Panamanian wrestler (born 1962)

Personal information
- Nationality: Panamanian
- Born: 30 March 1962 (age 63)

Sport
- Sport: Wrestling

Herminio Hidalgo (born 30 March 1962) is a Panamanian wrestler. He competed in two events at the 1988 Summer Olympics.
