= Mohamed Nakdali =

Syrian wrestler

Mohamed Nakdali (Arabic: محمد نكدلي; born 15 February 1962) is a Syrian former wrestler who competed in the 1980 Summer Olympics and in the 1984 Summer Olympics.
