= Saïd Souaken =

Moroccan wrestler

Personal information
- Nationality: Moroccan
- Born: 1957 (age 67–68)

Sport
- Sport: Wrestling

Saïd Souaken (born 1957) is a Moroccan wrestler. He competed at the 1984 Summer Olympics and the 1988 Summer Olympics.
