= René Neyer =

Swiss wrestler

Personal information
- Nationality: Swiss
- Born: 4 August 1961 (age 63)

Sport
- Sport: Wrestling

René Neyer (born 4 August 1961) is a Swiss wrestler. He competed at the 1984 Summer Olympics and the 1988 Summer Olympics.
