= Boris Goldstein (wrestler) =

Argentine wrestler

Personal information
- Nationality: Argentine
- Born: 4 September 1966 (age 58)

Sport
- Sport: Wrestling

Boris Goldstein (born 4 September 1966) is an Argentine former wrestler. He competed in two events at the 1984 Summer Olympics.
