= Petrică Cărare =

Romanian wrestler

Personal information
- Nationality: Romanian
- Born: 22 May 1963 (age 61); Ivănești, Romania

Sport
- Sport: Wrestling

Petrică Cărare (born 22 May 1963) is a Romanian wrestler. He competed at the 1988 Summer Olympics and the 1992 Summer Olympics.
