= Claudio Passarelli =

German wrestler (born 1965)

Personal information
- Born: 18 January 1965 (age 61) Ludwigshafen, West Germany
- Height: 169 cm (5 ft 7 in)
- Weight: 68 kg (150 lb)
Medal record
Men's Greco-Roman wrestling
Representing West Germany
World Championships
Gold medal – first place	1989 Martigny	68 kg

Claudio Passarelli (born 18 January 1965 in Ludwigshafen) is a German former wrestler who won the world championship in 1989. His brother Pasquale was also a successful wrestler.
