= Edmundo Ichillumpa =

Peruvian wrestler

Personal information
- Nationality: Peruvian
- Born: 13 March 1957 (age 68)

Sport
- Sport: Wrestling

Edmundo Ichillumpa (born 13 March 1957) is a Peruvian wrestler. He competed in two events at the 1988 Summer Olympics.
