= Daniel Navarrete (wrestler) =

Argentine wrestler (born 1963)

Personal information
- Nationality: Argentine
- Born: 6 January 1963 (age 62)

Sport
- Sport: Wrestling

Daniel Navarrete (born 6 January 1963) is an Argentine former wrestler. He competed at the 1984 Summer Olympics and the 1988 Summer Olympics.
