= Muneir Al-Masri =

Jordanian wrestler

Personal information
- Nationality: Jordanian
- Born: 17 March 1963 (age 62)

Sport
- Sport: Wrestling

Muneir Al-Masri (born 17 March 1963) is a Jordanian wrestler. He competed in two events at the 1988 Summer Olympics and was the flag bearer for Jordan at those games.
