= Kosei Akaishi =

Japanese wrestler (born 1965)

Medal record

Men's freestyle wrestling

Representing Japan

Olympic Games
Silver medal – second place	1984 Los Angeles	62 kg
Bronze medal – third place	1992 Barcelona	68 kg

World Championships
Silver medal – second place	1989 Martigny	68 kg

World Superchampionships
Silver medal – second place	1985 Tokyo	62 kg

Kosei Akaishi (赤石 光生, Akaishi Kōsei; born 26 February 1965) is a Japanese former wrestler who competed in the 1984 Summer Olympics, in the 1988 Summer Olympics, and in the 1992 Summer Olympics.
