= Bulgaria at the 1992 Summer Olympics =

- IOC code: BUL
- NOC: Bulgarian Olympic Committee
- Website: www.bgolympic.org (in Bulgarian and English)

in Barcelona
- Competitors: 138 in 19 sports
- Flag bearer: Ivaylo Yordanov
- Medals Ranked 18th: Gold 3 Silver 7 Bronze 6 Total 16

Summer Olympics appearances (overview)
- 1896; 1900–1920; 1924; 1928; 1932; 1936; 1948; 1952; 1956; 1960; 1964; 1968; 1972; 1976; 1980; 1984; 1988; 1992; 1996; 2000; 2004; 2008; 2012; 2016; 2020; 2024

Bulgaria competed at the 1992 Summer Olympics in Barcelona, Spain. 138 competitors, 87 men and 51 women, took part in 116 events in 19 sports.

== Medalists ==
Medal	Name	Sport	Event	Date
Gold	Ivan Ivanov	Weightlifting	Men's 52 kg	26 July
Gold	Nikolay Buhalov	Canoeing	Men's C-1 500 metres	7 August
Gold	Nikolay Buhalov	Canoeing	Men's C-1 1000 metres	8 August
Silver	Vesela Lecheva	Shooting	Women's 10 metre air rifle	26 July
Silver	Nikolay Peshalov	Weightlifting	Men's 60 kg	28 July
Silver	Yoto Yotov	Weightlifting	Men's 67.5 kg	29 July
Silver	Nonka Matova	Shooting	Women's 50 metre rifle three positions	30 July
Silver	Tsvetanka Hristova	Athletics	Women's discus throw	3 August
Silver	Valentin Getsov	Wrestling	Men's freestyle 68 kg	5 August
Silver	Daniel Petrov	Boxing	Light flyweight	8 August
Bronze	Mariya Grozdeva	Shooting	Women's 10 metre air pistol	1 August
Bronze	Stefan Botev	Weightlifting	Men's 110 kg	3 August
Bronze	Valentin Yordanov	Wrestling	Men's freestyle 52 kg	5 August
Bronze	Yordanka Donkova	Athletics	Women's 100 metres hurdles	6 August
Bronze	Martin Marinov; Blagovest Stoyanov	Canoeing	Men's C-2 500 metres	7 August
Bronze	Svilen Rusinov	Boxing	Super heavyweight	7 August

== Competitors ==
The following is the list of number of competitors in the Games.

Sport	Men	Women	Total
Archery	1	0	1
Athletics	11	10	21
Badminton	2	5	7
Boxing	7	–	7
Canoeing	7	4	11
Cycling	1	0	1
Diving	1	0	1
Equestrian	1	0	1
Gymnastics	6	8	14
Judo	4	1	5
Modern pentathlon	2	–	2
Rowing	3	12	15
Shooting	7	6	13
Swimming	4	1	5
Table tennis	0	1	1
Tennis	0	3	3
Weightlifting	10	–	10
Wrestling	20	–	20
Total	87	51	138

== Archery ==
After a twelve-year absence from archery, Bulgaria returned in 1992. Only one archer competed. He did not qualify for the elimination rounds.

Men

Athlete	Event	Ranking round		Round of 32	Round of 16	Quarterfinals	Semifinals	Final / BM	
Athlete	Event	Score	Seed	Opposition Score	Opposition Score	Opposition Score	Opposition Score	Opposition Score	Rank
Ivan Ivanov	Individual	1262	35	Did not advance					

== Athletics ==
Men
Track and road events

Athlete	Event	Heats		Quarterfinal		Semifinal		Final	
Athlete	Event	Result	Rank	Result	Rank	Result	Rank	Result	Rank
Nikolay Antonov	200 metres	20.94	15 Q	20.50	9 Q	20.55	10	Did not advance	
Evgeni Ignatov	5000 metres	DNF		—				Did not advance	
Asen Markov	400 metres hurdles	50.21	27	—		Did not advance			

Field events

Athlete	Event	Qualification		Final	
Athlete	Event	Distance	Position	Distance	Position
Georgi Dakov	High jump	2.26	12 q	2.24	14
Galin Nikov	Pole vault	5.50	16	Did not advance	
Galin Georgiev	Long jump	7.75	19	Did not advance	
Galin Georgiev	Triple jump	NM		Did not advance	
Khristo Markov	Triple jump	16.46	21	Did not advance	
Nikolay Raev	Triple jump	14.67	43	Did not advance	
Nikolay Kolev	Discus throw	58.12	22	Did not advance	
Plamen Minev	Hammer throw	69.90	21	Did not advance	
Ivan Tanev	Hammer throw	72.62	17	Did not advance	

Women
Track and road events

Athlete	Event	Heats		Quarterfinal		Semifinal		Final	
Athlete	Event	Result	Rank	Result	Rank	Result	Rank	Result	Rank
Anelia Nuneva	100 metres	11.34	7 Q	11.17	5 Q	11.24	6 Q	11.10	6
Anelia Nuneva	200 metres	23.32	17 Q	22.62	12 Q	DNS		Did not advance	
Yordanka Donkova	100 metres hurdles	12.96	3 Q	12.84	3 Q	12.87	2 Q	12.70	3rd place, bronze medalist(s)

Field events

Athlete	Event	Qualification		Final	
Athlete	Event	Distance	Position	Distance	Position
Lyudmila Andonova	High jump	1.88	25	Did not advance	
Stefka Kostadinova	High jump	1.92	1 Q	1.94	4
Svetlana Leseva	High jump	1.83	34	Did not advance	
Svetla Mitkova	Shot put	19.21	3 Q	19.23	6
Tsvetanka Khristova	Discus throw	64.06	7 Q	67.78	2nd place, silver medalist(s)
Stefania Simova	Discus throw	65.60	2 Q	63.42	8
Antoneta Selenska	Javelin throw	59.40	16	Did not advance	

Combined event – Heptathlon

Athlete	Event	100H	HJ	SP	200 m	LJ	JT	800 m	Total	Rank
Svetla Dimitrova	Result	13.23	1.70	14.68	23.31	6.11	44.48	2:07.90	6464	5
Svetla Dimitrova	Points	1090	855	839	1048	883	753	996	6464	5

== Badminton ==
Men

Athlete	Event	Round of 64	Round of 32	Round of 16	Quarterfinals	Semifinals	Final	
Athlete	Event	Opposition Result	Opposition Result	Opposition Result	Opposition Result	Opposition Result	Opposition Result	Rank
Yasen Borisov	Singles	Jäntti (FIN); L (6–15, 1–15)	Did not advance					
Ivan Ivanov	Singles	Bhattacharya (IND); L (4–15, 1–15)	Did not advance					
Yasen Borisov; Ivan Ivanov	Doubles	—	Lee / Shon (KOR); L (0–15, 1–15)	Did not advance				

Women

Athlete	Event	Round of 64	Round of 32	Round of 16	Quarterfinals	Semifinals	Final	
Athlete	Event	Opposition Result	Opposition Result	Opposition Result	Opposition Result	Opposition Result	Opposition Result	Rank
Viktoriya Hristova	Singles	Plungwech (THA); L (3–11, 9–12)	Did not advance					
Diana Koleva	Singles	Schmidt (GER); L (6–11, 1–11)	Did not advance					
Neli Nedyalkova-Boteva	Singles	Albrecht (SUI); L (3–11, 6–11)	Did not advance					
Emilia Dimitrova; Neli Nedyalkova-Boteva	Doubles	—	Bąk / Wilk (POL); L (16–17, 8–15)	Did not advance				
Diana Filipova; Diana Koleva	Doubles	—	Matsuo / Sasage (JPN); L (1–15, 2–15)	Did not advance				

== Boxing ==
Athlete	Event	Round of 32	Round of 16	Quarterfinals	Semifinals	Final	
Athlete	Event	Opposition Result	Opposition Result	Opposition Result	Opposition Result	Opposition Result	Rank
Daniel Petrov	Light flyweight	Dieppa (PUR); W 10–7	O (PRK); W RSC R3	Lakatos (HUN); W 17–8	Quast (GER); W 15–9	Marcelo (CUB); L 10–24	2nd place, silver medalist(s)
Yuliyan Strogov	Flyweight	Noan (PNG); W RSC R2	Austin (USA); L 7–19	Did not advance			
Serafim Todorov	Bantamweight	Sem (PNG); W 11–0	Chongo (ZAM); W 18–6	Ri (PRK); L 15–16	Did not advance		
Kirkor Kirkorov	Featherweight	Tews (GER); L 5–9	Did not advance				
Toncho Tonchev	Lightweight	González (CUB); W 14–12	Kungsi (PNG); W 11–2	De La Hoya (USA); L 7–16	Did not advance		
Stefan Trendafilov	Middleweight	Bye	Chao (CHN); W RSC R1	Johnson (CAN); W RSC R1	Did not advance		
Svilen Rusinov	Super heavyweight	Bye	Szikora (HUN); W 12–4	Fischer (GER); W 8–5	Igbineghu (NGR); L 7–9	Did not advance	3rd place, bronze medalist(s)

== Canoeing ==
=== Sprint ===
Men

Athlete	Event	Heats		Repechages		Semifinals		Final	
Athlete	Event	Time	Rank	Time	Rank	Time	Rank	Time	Rank
Nikolay Bukhalov	C-1 500 m	1:53.64	1 Q	BYE		1:53.32	1 Q	1:51.15	Gold medal
Nikolay Bukhalov	C-1 1000 m	4:03.36	2 Q	BYE		4:03.46	2 Q	4:05.92	Gold medal
Martin Marinov; Blagovest Stoyanov	C-2 500 m	1:44.00	2 Q	BYE				1:41.94	Bronze medal
Martin Marinov; Blagovest Stoyanov	C-2 1000 m	3:33.57	3 Q	—		3:39.58	1 Q	3:43.97	6
Milko Kazakov; Petar Godev	K-2 500 m	1:39.36	5 Q	1:33.42	4	did not advance			
Nikolay Yordanov; Petar Godev; Nikolay Georgiev; Milko Kazakov	K-4 1000 m	2:57.30	3 Q	—		2:57.42	5 Q	3:02.08	8

Women

Athlete	Event	Heats		Repechages		Semifinals		Final	
Athlete	Event	Time	Rank	Time	Rank	Time	Rank	Time	Rank
Bonka Pindzheva; Mariya Kichukova	K-2 500 m	1:50.04	5 Q	BYE		1:50.28	8	did not advance	
Bonka Pindzheva; Mariya Kichukova; Kinka Racheva; Tanya Georgieva	K-4 500 m	1:43.59	8 Q	—		1:45.90	6	did not advance	

== Cycling ==
One male cyclist represented Bulgaria in 1992.

=== Track ===
Time trial

Athlete	Event	Time	Rank
Kiril Georgiev	Men's time trial	1:07.371	21

== Diving ==
Men

Athlete	Event	Preliminary		Final	
Athlete	Event	Points	Rank	Points	Rank
Petar Trifonov	3 m Springboard	320.82	27	did not advance	

== Equestrianism ==
=== Eventing ===
Athlete	Horse	Event	Dressage		Cross-country			Jumping			Total	
Athlete	Horse	Event	Penalties	Rank	Penalties	Total	Rank	Penalties	Total	Rank	Penalties	Rank
Ilian Iliev	Dinar	Individual	95.00	82	DNF							

== Gymnastics ==
=== Artistic ===
==== Men ====
Team

Athlete	Event	Qualification							
Athlete	Event	Apparatus						Total	Rank
Athlete	Event	F	PH	R	V	PB	HB	Total	Rank
Ilian Aleksandrov	Team	18.900	18.550	18.625	18.550	18.425	18.950	112.000	67
Krasimir Dunev	Team	18.500	18.800	18.600	18.800	18.775	18.425	111.900	70
Kalofer Khristozov	Team	19.300	19.125	19.550 Q	19.025	19.125	19.175	115.300	10 Q
Deyan Kolev	Team	9.450	18.925	9.700	18.650	18.825	19.125	94.675	91
Georgi Lozanov	Team	18.775	17.650	18.475	9.375	17.950	19.025	101.250	90
Yordan Yovchev	Team	18.900	18.950	19.150	18.800	18.775	18.425	113.000	55
Total	Team	94.475	94.350	94.775	94.150	93.925	95.125	566.800	10

Individual finals

Athlete	Event	Apparatus						Total	Rank
Athlete	Event	F	PH	R	V	PB	HB	Total	Rank
Kalofer Khristozov	All-around	9.575	9.575	9.550	9.700	9.650	9.550	57.600	11
Kalofer Khristozov	Rings	—		9.750	—			9.750	8

==== Women ====
Team

Athlete	Event	Qualification					
Athlete	Event	Apparatus				Total	Rank
Athlete	Event	V	UB	BB	F	Total	Rank
Snezhana Khristakieva	Team	9.625	19.512	18.712	18.512	66.361	90
Tanya Maslarska	Team	19.337	18.349	18.862	18.987	75.535	82
Silvia Mitova	Team	19.762	19.675	19.574	19.762 Q	78.773	10 Q
Kristina Panayotova	Team	18.649	19.224	18.174	18.700	74.747	87
Svetlana Todorova	Team	19.412	19.299	17.837	18.900	75.448	83
Delyana Vodenicharova	Team	19.450	19.062	19.337	19.600	77.449	41 q
Total	Team	96.610	97.059	94.897	96.299	384.865	12

Individual finals

Athlete	Event	Apparatus				Total	Rank
Athlete	Event	V	UB	BB	F	Total	Rank
Silvia Mitova	All-around	9.825	9.887	9.825	9.862	39.399	11
Silvia Mitova	Floor	—			9.400	9.400	8
Delyana Vodenicharova	All-around	9.112	9.837	9.800	9.537	38.286	31

=== Rhythmic ===
Athlete	Event	Qualification						Final						
Athlete	Event	Hoop	Rope	Clubs	Ball	Total	Rank	Qualification	Hoop	Rope	Clubs	Ball	Total	Rank
Maria Petrova	Individual	9.450	9.475	9.500	9.400	37.825	5 Q	18.912	9.500	9.575	9.575	9.525	57.087	5
Diana Popova	Individual	9.550	9.500	9.050	9.550	37.650	7 Q	18.825	9.550	9.400	—	9.550	47.325	9

== Judo ==
Men

Athlete	Event	Round of 64	Round of 32	Round of 16	Quarterfinals	Semifinals	Repechage				Final	
Athlete	Event	Round of 64	Round of 32	Round of 16	Quarterfinals	Semifinals	Round 1	Round 2	Round 3	Round 4	Final	
Athlete	Event	Opposition Result	Opposition Result	Opposition Result	Opposition Result	Opposition Result	Opposition Result	Opposition Result	Opposition Result	Opposition Result	Opposition Result	Rank
Orlin Rusev	60 kg	Hüseynov (EUN); L Ippon	Did not advance				Bah (GUI); W Ippon	Cattedra (ITA); L Ippon	Did not advance			
Ivan Netov	65 kg	Bye	Csák (HUN); L Yuko	Did not advance			Mavatiku (ZAI); W Ippon	Petřikov (TCH); L Yusei-gachi	Did not advance			
Nikola Filipov	86 kg	Bye	Mufarrih (YEM); W Ippon	Legień (POL); L Ippon	Did not advance		—	Oduor (KEN); W Ippon	Yang (KOR); L Chui	Did not advance		
Dame Stoykov	+95 kg	—	Tranquillini (BRA); W Ippon	Bat-Erdene (MGL); W Yuko	Csősz (HUN); L Sogo-gachi	Did not advance	—	Bye	Keeve (USA); L Yuko	Did not advance		

Women

Athlete	Event	Round of 32	Round of 16	Quarterfinals	Semifinals	Repechage			Final	
Athlete	Event	Round of 32	Round of 16	Quarterfinals	Semifinals	Round 1	Round 2	Round 3	Final	
Athlete	Event	Opposition Result	Opposition Result	Opposition Result	Opposition Result	Opposition Result	Opposition Result	Opposition Result	Opposition Result	Rank
Emiliya Vacheva	52 kg	Maksutova (EUN); L Ippon	Did not advance							

== Modern pentathlon ==
Two male pentathletes represented Bulgaria in 1992.

Athlete	Event	Fencing (épée one touch)			Swimming (300 m freestyle)			Shooting (Air pistol)			Riding (show jumping)			Running (4000 m)			Total points	Final rank
Athlete	Event	Results	Rank	MP points	Time	Rank	MP points	Points	Rank	MP Points	Penalties	Rank	MP points	Time	Rank	MP Points	Total points	Final rank
Stefan Asenov	Individual	29–36	48	711	3:20.3	15	1272	188	17	1090	240	45	860	14:05.0	46	1030	4963	42
Valentin Dzhavelkov	Individual	32–33	40	762	3:31.0	47	1184	183	40	1015	210	42	890	14:10.7	49	1015	4866	46

== Rowing ==
Men

Athlete	Event	Heats		Repechage		Semifinals		Final	
Athlete	Event	Time	Rank	Time	Rank	Time	Rank	Time	Rank
Yordan Danchev; Ivaylo Banchev	Double sculls	7:13.50	4 R	6:52.43	4 SC/D	6:30.77	2 FC	6:36.57	16
Yordan Danchev; Ivaylo Banchev; Stefan Stoykov	Coxed pair	8:03.56	5 R	7:33.73	4 FC	—		7:38.25	15

Women

Athlete	Event	Heats		Repechage		Semifinals		Final	
Athlete	Event	Time	Rank	Time	Rank	Time	Rank	Time	Rank
Violeta Ninova-Yordanova	Single sculls	8:08.43	5 R	7:58.70	1 Q	8:01.15	5 FB	8:16.22	10
Daniela Oronova; Galina Kamenova	Double sculls	7:19.53	2 Q	BYE		7:04.02	4 FB	7:04.19	7
Violeta Zareva; Teodora Zareva	Coxless pair	8:03.55	4 R	7:58.18	2 Q	7:28.37	3 Q	7:32.67	6
Lalka Berberova; Sevdalina Teokharova; Galina Anakhrieva; Rumyana Dzhadzharova-Neykova	Quadruple sculls	6:46.40	5 R	6:49.72	4 FB	—		6:53.71	9
Lalka Berberova; Mariana Yankulova; Liliya Stoyanova; Mariana Stoyanova	Coxed four	7:11.71	4 R	6:57.97	3 FB	—		6:57.78	9

== Shooting ==
Men

Athlete	Event	Qualification		Final	
Athlete	Event	Score	Rank	Score	Rank
Ivan Dimitrov	25 m rapid fire pistol	577	24	did not advance	
Tanyu Kiryakov	50 m pistol	567	2 Q	618 (DNF)	8
Tanyu Kiryakov	10 m air pistol	583	5 Q	679.7	7
Spas Koprinkov	50 m pistol	558	11	did not advance	
Spas Koprinkov	10 m air pistol	578	12	did not advance	
Emil Milev	25 m rapid fire pistol	581	20	did not advance	
Stoyan Stamenov	10 m air rifle	583	31	did not advance	
Petar Zaprianov	50 m rifle prone	591	31	did not advance	

Women

Athlete	Event	Qualification		Final	
Athlete	Event	Score	Rank	Score	Rank
Mariya Grozdeva	25 m pistol	574	18	did not advance	
Mariya Grozdeva	10 m air pistol	383	3 Q	481.6	Bronze medal
Vesela Letcheva	50 m rifle three positions	581	5 Q	678.0	6
Vesela Letcheva	10 m air rifle	396	1 Q	495.3	Silver medal
Nonka Matova	50 m rifle three positions	584	3 Q	682.7	Silver medal
Tanya Staneva	10 m air pistol	373	35	did not advance	
Diana Yorgova	25 m pistol	570	29	did not advance	
Anitsa Valkova	10 m air rifle	392	10	did not advance	

Open

Athlete	Event	Qualification		Final	
Athlete	Event	Score	Rank	Score	Rank
Anton Manolov	Skeet	138	57	did not advance	

== Swimming ==
Men

Athlete	Event	Heat		Final B		Final	
Athlete	Event	Time	Rank	Time	Rank	Time	Rank
Denislav Kalchev	200 metre butterfly	2:03.73	33	did not advance			
Denislav Kalchev	200 metre individual medley	2:06.51	26	did not advance			
Denislav Kalchev	400 metre individual medley	4:31.49	23	did not advance			
Dragomir Markov	100 metre backstroke	58.17	34	did not advance			
Dragomir Markov	100 metre butterfly	55.85	32	did not advance			
Georgi Mihalev	100 metre backstroke	56.59	11 Q	56.85	15	did not advance	
Georgi Mihalev	200 metre backstroke	2:02.24	13 Q	DNS		did not advance	
Khristian Minkovski	100 metre butterfly	56.94	45	did not advance			
Khristian Minkovski	200 metre butterfly	2:05.18	35	did not advance			

Women

Athlete	Event	Heat		Final B		Final	
Athlete	Event	Time	Rank	Time	Rank	Time	Rank
Mariya Kocheva	100 metre backstroke	1:06.17	37	did not advance			
Mariya Kocheva	200 metre backstroke	2:21.79	36	did not advance			

== Table tennis ==
Women

Athlete	Event	Group Stage				Round of 16	Quarterfinal	Semifinal	Final	
Athlete	Event	Opposition Result	Opposition Result	Opposition Result	Rank	Opposition Result	Opposition Result	Opposition Result	Opposition Result	Rank
Daniela Gergelcheva	Singles	Kaffo (NGR); W 2–0	Doti (BRA); W 2–1	Vriesekoop (NED); L 0–2	2	Did not advance				

== Tennis ==
Women

Athlete	Event	Round of 64	Round of 32	Round of 16	Quarterfinals	Semifinals	Final	
Athlete	Event	Opposition Result	Opposition Result	Opposition Result	Opposition Result	Opposition Result	Opposition Result	Rank
Katerina Maleeva	Singles	Neiland (LAT); W (7–6, 6–2)	Maniokova (EUN); L (6–7, 6–4, 0–6)	Did not advance				
Magdalena Maleeva	Singles	Zardo (SUI); W (6–2, 6–4)	Date (JPN); W (6–2, 6–4)	Graf (GER); L (3–6, 4–6)	Did not advance			
Elena Pampoulova	Singles	Endo (JPN); L (6–7, 6–7)	Did not advance					

== Weightlifting ==
Athlete	Event	Snatch		Clean & jerk		Total	Rank
Athlete	Event	Result	Rank	Result	Rank	Total	Rank
Ivan Ivanov	52 kg	115.0	1	150.0	1	265.0	1st place, gold medalist(s)
Sevdalin Minchev	52 kg	112.5	4	NM		DNF	
Nikolay Peshalov	60 kg	137.5	2	167.5	2	305.0	2nd place, silver medalist(s)
Neno Terziyski	60 kg	130.0	4	165.0	3	295.0	4
Yoto Yotov	67.5 kg	150.0	2	177.5	2	327.5	2nd place, silver medalist(s)
Plamen Bratoychev	82.5 kg	167.5	1	197.5	6	365.0	5
Ivan Chakarov	90 kg	170.0	4	207.5	6	377.5	5
Petar Stefanov	100 kg	170.0	6	210.0	5	380.0	5
Stefan Botev	110 kg	190.0	3	227.5	3	417.5	3rd place, bronze medalist(s)
Mitko Mitev	+110 kg	180.0	4	220.0	6	400.0	5

== Wrestling ==
Greco-Roman

Athlete	Event	Group Stage							Final	
Athlete	Event	Opposition Result	Opposition Result	Opposition Result	Opposition Result	Opposition Result	Opposition Result	Rank	Opposition Result	Rank
Nuran Pelikyan	48 kg	Simkhah (IRI); L 5–7	Yildiz (GER); L 1–3	Did not advance				7	Did not advance	
Bratan Tsenov	52 kg	Valentín (DOM); W 16–0	Öztürk (TUR); W 2–0	Rønningen (NOR); L 3–5	Sheldon (USA); L 2–5	—		3	Rebegea (ROU); W 6–1	5
Nikolay Dimitrov	57 kg	Šukevičius (LTU); W 4–2	Mourier (FRA); L 1–4	Hall (USA); L fall	Did not advance			7	Did not advance	
Stanislav Grigorov	62 kg	Aziz (SWE); W 3–0	Arkoudeas (GRE); W 13–3	Pirim (TUR); L 1–2	Marén (CUB); L 1–5	Did not advance		4	Dietsche (SUI); W w/o	7
Stoyan Stoyanov	68 kg	Repka (HUN); L 1–4	Baranov (ISR); W 2–0	Yalouz (FRA); L 2–3	Did not advance			6	Did not advance	
Dobri Ivanov	74 kg	Martins (POR); W 6–1	Almanza (CUB); L 2–3	Wei (CHN); W 9–0	Bye	Iskandaryan (EUN); L 1–9	Did not advance	4	Zeman (TCH); L w/o	8
Hristo Hristov	82 kg	Niemi (FIN); L 0–1	Arghira (ROU); W 4–0	Frinta (TCH); L 0–0	Did not advance			7	Did not advance	
Ivaylo Yordanov	90 kg	Konstantinidis (GRE); W 5–1	Campanella (ITA); L 2–3	Başar (TUR); L 1–2	Did not advance			5	Marx (AUT); L w/o	10
Atanas Komchev	100 kg	Diouf (SEN); W fall	Demyashkevich (EUN); L 0–4	Milián (CUB); L 2–8	Did not advance			6	Did not advance	
Rangel Gerovski	130 kg	Ghaffari (USA); L 0–0	Klauz (HUN); L 0–1	Did not advance				6	Did not advance	

Freestyle

Athlete	Event	Group Stage							Final	
Athlete	Event	Opposition Result	Opposition Result	Opposition Result	Opposition Result	Opposition Result	Opposition Result	Rank	Opposition Result	Rank
Marian Avramov	48 kg	Martínez (CUB); L 2–3	Óváry (HUN); W 7–2	Kim (PRK); L 0–3	Did not advance			6	Did not advance	
Valentin Yordanov	52 kg	Tohuzov (EUN); W 2–1	Oziti (NGR); W fall	Torkan (IRI); W 3–2	Orel (TUR); W 17–8	Bye	Ri (PRK); L 4–6	2	Kim (KOR); W 9–3	3rd place, bronze medalist(s)
Rumen Pavlov	57 kg	Bye	Kim (KOR); W fall	Šorov (IOA); W fall	Smal (EUN); L 1–12	Kim (PRK); L 3–10	—	3	Cross (USA); W fall	5
Rosen Vasilev	62 kg	Cáceres (ESP); W 10–3	Nieves (PUR); W 6–2	Grzywiński (POL); W 5–4	Mohammadian (IRI); L 2–4	Bye	Ilhan (AUS); W 8–3	2	Reinoso (CUB); L 0–4	4
Valentin Getsov	68 kg	Akbarnejad (IRI); W 3–2	Wilson (CAN); L 1–3	Santoro (FRA); W 9–2	Bye	Ko (KOR); W 7–5	—	1	Fadzayev (EUN); L 1–13	2nd place, silver medalist(s)
Valentin Zhelev	74 kg	Enkhbayar (MGL); W 3–1	Yiğit (TUR); L 1–2	Gadzhiev (EUN); L 2–3	Did not advance			5	Vasiliadis (GRE); L w/o	10
Rahmat Sofiadi	82 kg	Gstöttner (GER); L 2–3	Okporu (NGR); W 4–1	Bye	Lohyňa (TCH); L 2–3	Did not advance		6	Did not advance	
Kaloyan Baev	90 kg	Deskoulidis (GRE); L 2–8	Sükhbat (MGL); L 1–8	Did not advance				7	Did not advance	
Miroslav Makaveev	100 kg	Rossouw (RSA); W 6–5	Kayalı (TUR); L 1–5	Khabelov (EUN); L 0–3	Did not advance			5	Gholami (IRI); L fall	10
Kiril Barbutov	130 kg	Baumgartner (USA); L 1–9	Gobejishvili (EUN); L 1–7	Did not advance				5	Figueroa (PUR); W 11–0	9
