= Tunisia at the 1992 Summer Olympics =

- IOC code: TUN
- NOC: Tunisian Olympic Committee
- Website: www.cnot.org.tn (in French)

in Barcelona
- Competitors: 13 in 7 sports
- Flag bearer: Fadhel Khayati
- Medals: Gold 0 Silver 0 Bronze 0 Total 0

Summer Olympics appearances (overview)
- 1960; 1964; 1968; 1972; 1976; 1980; 1984; 1988; 1992; 1996; 2000; 2004; 2008; 2012; 2016; 2020; 2024

Tunisia competed at the 1992 Summer Olympics in Barcelona, Spain.

== Competitors ==
The following is the list of number of competitors in the Games.

Sport	Men	Women	Total
Athletics	1	0	1
Boxing	3	–	3
Judo	1	0	1
Sailing	1	0	1
Table tennis	1	2	3
Weightlifting	1	–	1
Wrestling	3	–	3
Total	11	2	13

== Athletics ==
Men
Track & road events

Athlete	Event	Heat		Quarterfinal		Semifinal		Final	
Athlete	Event	Result	Rank	Result	Rank	Result	Rank	Result	Rank
Mahmoud El-Kalboussi	5000 m	13:55.01	8	Did not advance					

== Boxing ==
Men

Athlete	Event	1 Round	2 Round	3 Round	Quarterfinals	Semifinals	Final
Athlete	Event	Opposition Result	Opposition Result	Opposition Result	Opposition Result	Opposition Result	Rank
Kalai Riadh	Bantamweight	BYE	Miguel Dias (NED); W 17-1	Joel Casamayor (CUB); L 11-16	Did not advance		
Mohamed Soltani	Featherweight	BYE	Davis Lusimbo (UGA); W 13-8	Eddy Suarez (CUB); L RSC-2	Did not advance		
Lotfi Missaoui	Middleweight	BYE	Gilberto Brown (ISV); L 4-6	Did not advance			

== Judo ==
Men

Athlete	Event	Round 1	Round 2	Round 3	Quarterfinal	Semifinal	Repechage 1	Repechage 2	Final / BM
Athlete	Event	Opposition Result	Opposition Result	Opposition Result	Opposition Result	Opposition Result	Opposition Result	Opposition Result	Rank
Salah Rekik	Half Middleweight	BYE	Zsolt Zsoldos (HUN); L 0000-0001	Did not advance					

== Sailing ==
Men

Athlete	Event	Race										Net points	Final rank
Athlete	Event	1	2	3	4	5	6	7	8	9	10	Net points	Final rank
Karim Chammari	Lechner A-390	34	37	29	~~PMS~~	32	30	28	36	37	28	345.0	34

== Table Tennis ==
Athlete	Event	Group stage	Round of 32	Round of 16	Quarterfinals	Semifinals	Final	
Athlete	Event	Opposition Result	Opposition Result	Opposition Result	Opposition Result	Opposition Result	Opposition Result	Rank
Mourad Sta	Men's singles	0-3	Did not advance					
Feiza Ben Aïssa	Women's singles	0-3	Did not advance					
Sonia Touati	Women's singles	0-3	Did not advance					
Feiza Ben Aïssa; Sonia Touati	Women's doubles	0-3	Did not advance					

== Weightlifting ==
Men

Athlete	Event	Snatch		Clean & jerk		Total	Rank
Athlete	Event	Result	Rank	Result	Rank	Total	Rank
Arbi Trab	−56 kg	100.0	19	120.0	19	220.0	19

== Wrestling ==
Men's Greco-Roman

Athlete	Event	Elimination Pool						Final round	
Athlete	Event	Round 1 Result	Round 2 Result	Round 3 Result	Round 4 Result	Round 5 Result	Round 6 Result	Final round Result	Rank
Mohamed Naouar	−90 kg	Franz Marx (AUT); L 0-5	Maik Bullmann (GER); L 0-16	—N/a				Did not advance	19

Men's Freestyle

Athlete	Event	Elimination Pool						Final round	
Athlete	Event	Round 1 Result	Round 2 Result	Round 3 Result	Round 4 Result	Round 5 Result	Round 6 Result	Final round Result	Rank
Chaouki Sammari	−48 kg	László Óváry (HUN); L 5-7	BYE	Reiner Heugabel (GER); L 0-3	—N/a			Did not advance	18
Chokri Boudchiche	−52 kg	Zeke Jones (USA); L 0-15	Chris Woodcroft (CAN); L 0-10	—N/a				Did not advance	18

== Sources ==
- Official Olympic Reports
