= Wrestling at the 1992 Summer Olympics – Men's Greco-Roman 90 kg =

Men's Greco-Roman 90 kg at the Games of the XXV Olympiad
- Venue: Institut Nacional d'Educació Física de Catalunya
- Dates: 28–30 July 1992
- Competitors: 19 from 19 nations

Medalists
1st place, gold medalist(s)		Maik Bullmann	Germany
2nd place, silver medalist(s)		Hakkı Başar	Turkey
3rd place, bronze medalist(s)		Gogi Koguashvili	Unified Team

The men's Greco-Roman 90 kilograms at the 1992 Summer Olympics as part of the wrestling program were held at the Institut Nacional d'Educació Física de Catalunya from July 28 to July 30. The wrestlers are divided into 2 groups. The winner of each group decided by a double-elimination system.

== Results ==
Legend

- WO — Won by walkover

=== Elimination A ===
==== Round 1 ====
	Score		CP
Tibor Komáromi (HUN)	2–1	Harri Koskela (FIN)	3–1 PP
Hakkı Başar (TUR)	2–1	Gogi Koguashvili (EUN)	3–1 PP
Ivaylo Yordanov (BUL)	5–1	Iordanis Konstantinidis (GRE)	3–1 PP
Salvatore Campanella (ITA)	1–5	Michial Foy (USA)	1–3 PP
Henri Meiss (FRA)	1–0	Pajo Ivošević (IOP)	3–0 PO

==== Round 2 ====
	Score		CP
Tibor Komáromi (HUN)	0–0	Hakkı Başar (TUR)	0–0 D2
Harri Koskela (FIN)	1–2	Gogi Koguashvili (EUN)	1–3 PP
Ivaylo Yordanov (BUL)	2–3	Salvatore Campanella (ITA)	1–3 PP
Iordanis Konstantinidis (GRE)	6–1	Henri Meiss (FRA)	3–1 PP
Michial Foy (USA)	4–3	Pajo Ivošević (IOP)	3–1 PP

==== Round 3 ====
	Score		CP
Tibor Komáromi (HUN)	2–3	Gogi Koguashvili (EUN)	1–3 PP
Hakkı Başar (TUR)	2–1	Ivaylo Yordanov (BUL)	3–1 PP
Iordanis Konstantinidis (GRE)	2–4	Salvatore Campanella (ITA)	1–3 PP
Michial Foy (USA)	9–0 Fall	Henri Meiss (FRA)	4–0 TO

==== Round 4 ====
	Score		CP
Hakkı Başar (TUR)	5–0 Fall	Salvatore Campanella (ITA)	4–0 TO
Gogi Koguashvili (EUN)	10–6	Michial Foy (USA)	3–1 PP

==== Round 5 ====
	Score		CP
Hakkı Başar (TUR)	4–3	Michial Foy (USA)	3–1 PP
Gogi Koguashvili (EUN)		Bye	

==== Summary ====
Pos	Athlete	Pld	W	L	R	CP	TP
1	Hakkı Başar (TUR)	5	4	1	X (Note: Classification points: TUR 6, EUN 4, USA 2)	13	13
2	Gogi Koguashvili (EUN)	4	3	1	X	10	16
3	Michial Foy (USA)	5	3	2	X	12	27
4	Salvatore Campanella (ITA)	4	2	2	4	7	8
5	Ivaylo Yordanov (BUL)	3	1	2	3	5	8
—	Iordanis Konstantinidis (GRE)	3	1	2	3	5	9
—	Tibor Komáromi (HUN)	3	1	2	3	4	4
—	Henri Meiss (FRA)	3	1	2	3	4	2
—	Harri Koskela (FIN)	2	0	2	2	2	2
—	Pajo Ivošević (IOP)	2	0	2	2	1	3

Source: Official Report

=== Elimination B ===
==== Round 1 ====
	Score		CP
Eom Jin-han (KOR)	1–0	Yasutoshi Moriyama (JPN)	3–0 PO
Mikael Ljungberg (SWE)	1–0	Reynaldo Peña (CUB)	3–0 PO
Franz Marx (AUT)	5–0	Mohamed Naouar (TUN)	3–0 PO
Maik Bullmann (GER)	5–0	Moustafa Ramadan Hussein (EGY)	3–0 PO
Hassan Babak (IRI)		Bye	

==== Round 2 ====
	Score		CP
Hassan Babak (IRI)	2–0	Eom Jin-han (KOR)	3–0 PO
Yasutoshi Moriyama (JPN)	0–5	Mikael Ljungberg (SWE)	0–3 PO
Reynaldo Peña (CUB)	4–3	Franz Marx (AUT)	3–1 PP
Mohamed Naouar (TUN)	0–16	Maik Bullmann (GER)	0–4 ST
Moustafa Ramadan Hussein (EGY)		Bye	

==== Round 3 ====
	Score		CP
Hassan Babak (IRI)	2–1	Moustafa Ramadan Hussein (EGY)	3–1 PP
Eom Jin-han (KOR)	0–8	Reynaldo Peña (CUB)	0–3 PO
Mikael Ljungberg (SWE)	4–1	Franz Marx (AUT)	3–1 PP
Maik Bullmann (GER)		Bye	

==== Round 4 ====
	Score		CP
Maik Bullmann (GER)	4–0	Mikael Ljungberg (SWE)	3–0 PO
Hassan Babak (IRI)	2–0	Reynaldo Peña (CUB)	3–0 PO

==== Round 5 ====
	Score		CP
Maik Bullmann (GER)	3–1	Hassan Babak (IRI)	3–1 PP
Mikael Ljungberg (SWE)		Bye	

==== Round 6 ====
	Score		CP
Mikael Ljungberg (SWE)	2–0	Hassan Babak (IRI)	3–0 PO
Maik Bullmann (GER)		Bye	

==== Summary ====
Pos	Athlete	Pld	W	L	R	CP	TP
1	Maik Bullmann (GER)	4	4	0	X (Note: Classification points: GER 6, SWE 3, IRI 1)	13	28
2	Mikael Ljungberg (SWE)	5	4	1	X	12	12
3	Hassan Babak (IRI)	5	3	2	X	10	7
4	Reynaldo Peña (CUB)	4	2	2	4	6	12
5	Franz Marx (AUT)	3	1	2	3	5	9
—	Eom Jin-han (KOR)	3	1	2	3	3	1
—	Moustafa Ramadan Hussein (EGY)	2	0	2	3	1	1
—	Yasutoshi Moriyama (JPN)	2	0	2	2	0	0
—	Mohamed Naouar (TUN)	2	0	2	2	0	0

Source: Official Report

=== Finals ===
	Score		CP
9th place match
Ivaylo Yordanov (BUL)	WO	Franz Marx (AUT)	
7th place match
Salvatore Campanella (ITA)	WO	Reynaldo Peña (CUB)	0–4 EF
5th place match
Michial Foy (USA)	1–17	Hassan Babak (IRI)	0–4 ST
Bronze medal match
Gogi Koguashvili (EUN)	2–0	Mikael Ljungberg (SWE)	3–0 PO
Gold medal match
Hakkı Başar (TUR)	0–5	Maik Bullmann (GER)	0–3 PO

== Final standing ==
Rank	Athlete
1st place, gold medalist(s)	Maik Bullmann (GER)
2nd place, silver medalist(s)	Hakkı Başar (TUR)
3rd place, bronze medalist(s)	Gogi Koguashvili (EUN)
4	Mikael Ljungberg (SWE)
5	Hassan Babak (IRI)
6	Michial Foy (USA)
7	Reynaldo Peña (CUB)
8	Salvatore Campanella (ITA)
9	Franz Marx (AUT)
10	Ivaylo Yordanov (BUL)
