= Wrestling at the 1992 Summer Olympics – Men's freestyle 52 kg =

Men's freestyle 52 kg at the Games of the XXV Olympiad
- Venue: Institut Nacional d'Educació Física de Catalunya
- Dates: 3–5 August 1992
- Competitors: 18 from 18 nations

Medalists
1st place, gold medalist(s)		Ri Hak-son	North Korea
2nd place, silver medalist(s)		Zeke Jones	United States
3rd place, bronze medalist(s)		Valentin Yordanov	Bulgaria

The men's freestyle 52 kilograms at the 1992 Summer Olympics as part of the wrestling program were held at the Institut Nacional d'Educació Física de Catalunya from August 3 to August 5. The wrestlers are divided into 2 groups. The winner of each group decided by a double-elimination system.

== Results ==
Legend

- WO — Won by walkover

=== Elimination A ===
==== Round 1 ====
	Score		CP
Ri Hak-son (PRK)	15–0	Joe Oziti (NGR)	4–0 ST
Valentin Yordanov (BUL)	2–1	Vladimir Toguzov (EUN)	3–1 PP
Shane Stannett (NZL)	0–12 Fall	Majid Torkan (IRI)	0–4 TO
Anil Kumar (IND)	1–17	Ahmet Orel (TUR)	0–4 ST
Tserenbaataryn Enkhbayar (MGL)		Bye	

==== Round 2 ====
	Score		CP
Tserenbaataryn Enkhbayar (MGL)	0–4	Ri Hak-son (PRK)	0–3 PO
Joe Oziti (NGR)	2–3 Fall	Valentin Yordanov (BUL)	0–4 TO
Vladimir Toguzov (EUN)	0–1	Shane Stannett (NZL)	0–3 PO
Majid Torkan (IRI)	16–1	Anil Kumar (IND)	4–0 ST
Ahmet Orel (TUR)		Bye	

==== Round 3 ====
	Score		CP
Ahmet Orel (TUR)	14–9	Tserenbaataryn Enkhbayar (MGL)	3–1 PP
Ri Hak-son (PRK)	11–0 Fall	Shane Stannett (NZL)	4–0 TO
Valentin Yordanov (BUL)	3–2	Majid Torkan (IRI)	3–1 PP

==== Round 4 ====
	Score		CP
Ahmet Orel (TUR)	4–6	Valentin Yordanov (BUL)	1–3 PP
Ri Hak-son (PRK)	4–0	Majid Torkan (IRI)	3–0 PO

==== Round 5 ====
	Score		CP
Ahmet Orel (TUR)	8–17	Ri Hak-son (PRK)	1–3 PP
Valentin Yordanov (BUL)		Bye	

==== Round 6 ====
	Score		CP
Valentin Yordanov (BUL)	4–6	Ri Hak-son (PRK)	1–3 PP
Ahmet Orel (TUR)		Bye	

==== Summary ====
Pos	Athlete	Pld	W	L	R	CP	TP
1	Ri Hak-son (PRK)	6	6	0	X (Note: Classification points: PRK 6, BUL 4, TUR 2)	20	57
2	Valentin Yordanov (BUL)	5	4	1	X	14	18
3	Ahmet Orel (TUR)	4	2	2	X	9	43
4	Majid Torkan (IRI)	4	2	2	4	9	30
—	Shane Stannett (NZL)	3	1	2	3	3	1
5	Tserenbaataryn Enkhbayar (MGL)	2	0	2	3	1	9
—	Vladimir Toguzov (EUN)	2	0	2	2	1	1
—	Anil Kumar (IND)	2	0	2	2	0	2
—	Joe Oziti (NGR)	2	0	2	2	0	2

Source: Official Report

=== Elimination B ===
==== Round 1 ====
	Score		CP
Constantin Corduneanu (ROM)	6–1	Chris Woodcroft (CAN)	3–1 PP
Chokri Boudchiche (TUN)	0–15	Zeke Jones (USA)	0–4 ST
Alfredo Leyva (CUB)	4–1	Thierry Bourdin (FRA)	3–1 PP
Mitsuru Sato (JPN)	3–5	Kim Sun-hak (KOR)	1–3 PP
Laureano Atanes (ESP)		Bye	

==== Round 2 ====
	Score		CP
Laureano Atanes (ESP)	0–15	Constantin Corduneanu (ROM)	0–4 ST
Chris Woodcroft (CAN)	10–0	Chokri Boudchiche (TUN)	3–0 PO
Zeke Jones (USA)	16–1	Alfredo Leyva (CUB)	4–0 ST
Thierry Bourdin (FRA)	3–7 Fall	Mitsuru Sato (JPN)	0–4 TO
Kim Sun-hak (KOR)		Bye	

==== Round 3 ====
	Score		CP
Kim Sun-hak (KOR)	11–0 Fall	Laureano Atanes (ESP)	4–0 TO
Constantin Corduneanu (ROM)	0–1	Zeke Jones (USA)	0–3 PO
Chris Woodcroft (CAN)	3–1 Fall	Alfredo Leyva (CUB)	4–0 TO
Mitsuru Sato (JPN)		Bye	

==== Round 4 ====
	Score		CP
Mitsuru Sato (JPN)	3–1 Fall	Constantin Corduneanu (ROM)	4–0 TO
Kim Sun-hak (KOR)	7–5	Chris Woodcroft (CAN)	3–1 PP
Zeke Jones (USA)		Bye	

==== Round 5 ====
	Score		CP
Zeke Jones (USA)	9–5	Mitsuru Sato (JPN)	3–1 PP
Kim Sun-hak (KOR)		Bye	

==== Round 6 ====
	Score		CP
Kim Sun-hak (KOR)	4–5	Zeke Jones (USA)	1–3 PP
Mitsuru Sato (JPN)		Bye	

==== Summary ====
Pos	Athlete	Pld	W	L	R	CP	TP
1	Zeke Jones (USA)	5	5	0	X (Note: Classification points: USA 6, KOR 4, JPN 2)	17	46
2	Kim Sun-hak (KOR)	4	3	1	X	11	27
3	Mitsuru Sato (JPN)	4	2	2	X	10	18
4	Chris Woodcroft (CAN)	4	2	2	4	9	19
5	Constantin Corduneanu (ROM)	4	2	2	4	7	22
—	Alfredo Leyva (CUB)	3	1	2	3	3	6
—	Laureano Atanes (ESP)	2	0	2	3	0	0
—	Thierry Bourdin (FRA)	2	0	2	2	1	4
—	Chokri Boudchiche (TUN)	2	0	2	2	0	0

Source: Official Report

=== Finals ===
	Score		CP
9th place match
Tserenbaataryn Enkhbayar (MGL)	WO	Constantin Corduneanu (ROM)	
7th place match
Majid Torkan (IRI)	2–1	Chris Woodcroft (CAN)	3–1 PP
5th place match
Ahmet Orel (TUR)	WO	Mitsuru Sato (JPN)	
Bronze medal match
Valentin Yordanov (BUL)	9–3	Kim Sun-hak (KOR)	3–1 PP
Gold medal match
Ri Hak-son (PRK)	8–1	Zeke Jones (USA)	3–1 PP

== Final standing ==
Rank	Athlete
1st place, gold medalist(s)	Ri Hak-son (PRK)
2nd place, silver medalist(s)	Zeke Jones (USA)
3rd place, bronze medalist(s)	Valentin Yordanov (BUL)
4	Kim Sun-hak (KOR)
5	Ahmet Orel (TUR)
6	Mitsuru Sato (JPN)
7	Majid Torkan (IRI)
8	Chris Woodcroft (CAN)
9	Constantin Corduneanu (ROM)
10	Tserenbaataryn Enkhbayar (MGL)
