= Alexei Kogalev =

Belgian diver

Personal information
- Nationality: Belgian
- Born: 16 April 1966 (age 60) Pyriatyn, Ukrainian SSR

Sport
- Sport: Diving

Alexei Kogalev (born 16 April 1966) is a Soviet-born Belgian diver. He competed in the men's 3 metre springboard event at the 1992 Summer Olympics.
