= Craig Vaughan =

South African diver

Personal information
- Nationality: South African
- Born: 13 January 1964 (age 61)

Sport
- Sport: Diving

Craig Vaughan (born 13 January 1964) is a South African diver. He competed in the men's 3 metre springboard event at the 1992 Summer Olympics.
