= Alfredo Leyva =

Cuban wrestler

Personal information
- Nationality: Cuban
- Born: 13 October 1969 (age 56)

Sport
- Sport: Wrestling

Alfredo Leyva (born 13 October 1969) is a Cuban wrestler. He competed in the men's freestyle 52 kg at the 1992 Summer Olympics.
