= Petar Trifonov =

Petar Trifonov may refer to:

- Petar Trifonov (footballer)
- Petar Trifonov (diver)
