= Shane Stannett =

New Zealand wrestler (born 1966)

Personal information
- Nationality: New Zealand
- Born: 24 June 1966 (age 60) Te Awamutu, New Zealand

Sport
- Sport: Wrestling

Shane Stannett (born 24 June 1966) is a New Zealand wrestler. He competed in the men's freestyle 52 kg at the 1992 Summer Olympics.
