= Laureano Atanes =

Spanish freestyle wrestler (born 1971)

Personal information
- Full name: Laureano Atanes Venegas
- Nationality: Spanish
- Born: 10 September 1971 (age 54) Barakaldo, Spain
- Height: 165 cm (5 ft 5 in)
- Weight: 126 lb (57 kg)

Sport
- Sport: Wrestling
- Weight class: flyweight
- Event: freestyle

"Laureano Atanes Venegas" (born September 10, 1971) is a Spanish wrestler from Barakaldo, Vizcaya, Spain. He competed in men's freestyle wrestling events, representing Spain in various international competitions. At the 1992 Summer Olympics held in Barcelona, Spain, Atanes represented Spain in the men's freestyle wrestling event in the flyweight category (52 kg), though he did not secure a medal.

== Major Championships ==
Atanes competed in several major championships during his wrestling career:

- 1994 World Championship''': 57.0 kg Freestyle (11th place)
- 1995 World Championship''': 57.0 kg Freestyle (24th place)
- 1992 European Championship''': 52.0 kg Freestyle (7th place)
- 1994 European Championship''': 57.0 kg Freestyle (13th place)
- 1995 European Championship''': 57.0 kg Freestyle (15th place)
