= Philippe Duvernay =

French diver

Personal information
- Nationality: French
- Born: 17 June 1970 (age 54); Lyon, France

Sport
- Sport: Diving

Philippe Duvernay (born 17 June 1970) is a French diver. He competed in the men's 3 metre springboard event at the 1992 Summer Olympics.
