= Anil Kumar (wrestler, born 1971) =

Indian wrestler

Personal information
- Nationality: Indian
- Born: 27 October 1971 (age 54)

Sport
- Sport: Wrestling

Anil Kumar (born 27 October 1971) is an Indian wrestler. He competed in the men's freestyle 52 kg at the 1992 Summer Olympics.
