= Henri Meiss =

French wrestler

Personal information
- Nationality: French
- Born: 12 November 1963 (age 62) Abidjan, Ivory Coast

Sport
- Sport: Wrestling

Henri Meiss (born 12 November 1963) is a French wrestler. He competed in the men's Greco-Roman 90 kg at the 1992 Summer Olympics.
