= Khristian Minkovski =

Bulgarian swimmer

Personal information
- Born: October 27, 1971 (age 54) Sofia, Bulgaria

Sport
- Sport: Swimming
- Strokes: Butterfly

Kristian Petkov Minkovski (Bulgarian: Kристиан Петков Минковски) (born October 27, 1971) is a retired butterfly swimmer from Bulgaria. He was a member of the Bulgarian National Swimming Team (four men and one woman) at the 1992 Summer Olympics in Barcelona, Spain. He didn't reach the finals in the men's 100 m butterfly (45th place) and the men's 200 m butterfly (35th place).
