= Joe Oziti =

Nigerian wrestler

Personal information
- Nationality: Nigerian
- Born: 2 April 1974 (age 52)

Sport
- Sport: Wrestling

Joe Oziti (born 2 April 1974) is a Nigerian wrestler. He competed in the men's freestyle 52 kg at the 1992 Summer Olympics.
