= Ivaylo Yordanov (wrestler) =

Bulgarian wrestler

Personal information
- Full name: Ivaylo Georgiev Yordanov
- Nationality: Bulgarian
- Born: 11 April 1966 (age 60) Vratsa, Bulgaria

Sport
- Sport: Wrestling

Ivaylo Georgiev Yordanov (Bulgarian: Ивайло Георгиев Йорданов; born 11 April 1966) is a Bulgarian wrestler. He competed in the men's Greco-Roman 90 kg at the 1992 Summer Olympics.
