= Sonia Touati =

Tunisian table tennis player

Personal information
- Full name: Sonia Touati
- Nationality: Tunisian
- Born: 13 March 1973 (age 52); Ras Jebel, Tunisia

Sport
- Sport: Table tennis

Sonia Touati (born 13 March 1973) is a Tunisian table tennis player. She competed at the 1992 Summer Olympics and the 1996 Summer Olympics.
