= Wrestling at the 1992 Summer Olympics =

Wrestling at the Games of the XXV Olympiad
- Venue: Institut Nacional d'Educació Física de Catalunya
- Dates: 26 July – 7 August
- No. of events: 20
- Competitors: 370 from 59 nations

At the 1992 Summer Olympics in Barcelona, 20 wrestling events were contested, for men only. There were 10 weight classes in each of the freestyle and Greco-Roman wrestling disciplines.

== Medal summary ==
=== Freestyle ===
Event	Gold	Silver	Bronze
48 kg	Kim Il; North Korea	Kim Jong-shin; South Korea	Vugar Orujov; Unified Team
52 kg	Ri Hak-son; North Korea	Zeke Jones; United States	Valentin Yordanov; Bulgaria
57 kg	Alejandro Puerto; Cuba	Sergey Smal; Unified Team	Kim Yong-sik; North Korea
62 kg	John Smith; United States	Askari Mohammadian; Iran	Lázaro Reinoso; Cuba
68 kg	Arsen Fadzaev; Unified Team	Valentin Getsov; Bulgaria	Kosei Akaishi; Japan
74 kg	Park Jang-soon; South Korea	Kenny Monday; United States	Amir Reza Khadem; Iran
82 kg	Kevin Jackson; United States	Elmadi Zhabrailov; Unified Team	Rasoul Khadem; Iran
90 kg	Makharbek Khadartsev; Unified Team	Kenan Şimşek; Turkey	Chris Campbell; United States
100 kg	Leri Khabelov; Unified Team	Heiko Balz; Germany	Ali Kayalı; Turkey
130 kg	Bruce Baumgartner; United States	Jeff Thue; Canada	David Gobejishvili; Unified Team

=== Greco-Roman ===
Event	Gold	Silver	Bronze
48 kg	Oleg Kucherenko; Unified Team	Vincenzo Maenza; Italy	Wilber Sánchez; Cuba
52 kg	Jon Rønningen; Norway	Alfred Ter-Mkrtchyan; Unified Team	Min Kyung-gab; South Korea
57 kg	An Han-bong; South Korea	Rıfat Yıldız; Germany	Sheng Zetian; China
62 kg	Mehmet Akif Pirim; Turkey	Sergey Martynov; Unified Team	Juan Marén; Cuba
68 kg	Attila Repka; Hungary	Islam Dugushiev; Unified Team	Rodney Smith; United States
74 kg	Mnatsakan Iskandaryan; Unified Team	Józef Tracz; Poland	Torbjörn Kornbakk; Sweden
82 kg	Péter Farkas; Hungary	Piotr Stępień; Poland	Daulet Turlykhanov; Unified Team
90 kg	Maik Bullmann; Germany	Hakkı Başar; Turkey	Gogi Koguashvili; Unified Team
100 kg	Héctor Milián; Cuba	Dennis Koslowski; United States	Sergey Demyashkevich; Unified Team
130 kg	Aleksandr Karelin; Unified Team	Tomas Johansson; Sweden	Ioan Grigoraș; Romania

== Medal table ==
Rank	Nation	Gold	Silver	Bronze	Total
1	Unified Team	6	5	5	16
2	United States	3	3	2	8
3	South Korea	2	1	1	4
4	Cuba	2	0	3	5
5	North Korea	2	0	1	3
6	Hungary	2	0	0	2
7	Turkey	1	2	1	4
8	Germany	1	2	0	3
9	Norway	1	0	0	1
10	Poland	0	2	0	2
11	Iran	0	1	2	3
12	Bulgaria	0	1	1	2
12	Sweden	0	1	1	2
14	Canada	0	1	0	1
14	Italy	0	1	0	1
16	China	0	0	1	1
16	Japan	0	0	1	1
16	Romania	0	0	1	1
Totals (18 entries)		20	20	20	60

== Participating nations ==
A total of 370 wrestlers from 59 nations competed at the Barcelona Games:

- Algeria (2)
- Argentina (1)
- Australia (2)
- Austria (2)
- Belgium (1)
- Brazil (1)
- Bulgaria (20)
- Canada (13)
- China (8)
- Colombia (1)
- Croatia (1)
- Cuba (15)
- Cyprus (1)
- Czechoslovakia (7)
- Dominican Republic (1)
- Egypt (3)
- Estonia (4)
- Finland (7)
- France (9)
- Germany (17)
- Great Britain (1)
- Greece (11)
- Guam (1)
- Guatemala (1)
- Hungary (17)
- Independent Olympic Participants (9)
- India (6)
- Iran (16)
- Israel (4)
- Italy (5)
- Japan (16)
- Latvia (1)
- Lithuania (1)
- Mexico (2)
- Mongolia (7)
- Morocco (4)
- New Zealand (2)
- Nicaragua (1)
- Nigeria (5)
- North Korea (4)
- Norway (2)
- Pakistan (1)
- Panama (2)
- Poland (13)
- Portugal (1)
- Puerto Rico (4)
- Romania (11)
- Senegal (3)
- South Africa (3)
- South Korea (16)
- Spain (10)
- Sweden (8)
- Switzerland (4)
- Syria (3)
- Tunisia (3)
- Turkey (15)
- Unified Team (20)
- United States (20)
- Venezuela (1)

== Sources ==
- "Olympic Medal Winners". International Olympic Committee.
- Official Olympic Report
