= Valentin Dzhavelkov =

Bulgarian modern pentathlete

Personal information
- Born: 11 February 1968 (age 58) Petrich, Bulgaria

Sport
- Sport: Modern pentathlon

Valentin Dzhavelkov (Bulgarian: Валентин Джавелков, born 11 February 1968) is a Bulgarian modern pentathlete. He competed at the 1992 Summer Olympics.
