= Michial Foy =

American wrestler (born 1962)

Personal information
- Born: February 24, 1962 (age 64) Chicago, Illinois, U.S.

Sport
- Country: United States
- Sport: Wrestling
- Weight class: 90 kg
- Event: Greco-Roman
- Club: Sunkist Kids Wrestling Club
- Team: USA
Medal record
Men's Greco-Roman wrestling
Representing United States
World Championships
Silver medal – second place	1989 Martigny	90 kg
Pan American Games
Silver medal – second place	1995 Mar del Plata	90 kg

Michial "Mike" Foy (born February 24, 1962) is an American former wrestler. He competed at the 1988 Summer Olympics and the 1992 Summer Olympics in Greco-Roman wrestling. In 1993, he was inducted into the Illinois Wrestling Coaches and Officials Association (IWCOA) Hall of Fame.
