= Ri Hak-son =

North Korean wrestler (born 1969)

- Hangul: 리학선
- RR: Ri Hakseon
- MR: Ri Haksŏn

Ri Hak-son
Medal record

Men's freestyle wrestling

Representing North Korea

Olympic Games
Gold medal – first place	1992 Barcelona	52 kg

Ri Hak-son (born 12 August 1969) is a North Korean wrestler and Olympic champion in Freestyle wrestling.

== Olympics ==
Ri competed at the 1992 Summer Olympics in Barcelona where he received a gold medal in Freestyle wrestling, the flyweight class.
