= Dragomir Markov =

Bulgarian swimmer

Personal information
- Born: 8 April 1971 (age 55) Sofia, Bulgaria

Sport
- Sport: Swimming
- Strokes: Backstroke, butterfly

Dragomir Denchev Markov (Bulgarian: Драгомир Денчев Мърков) (born 8 April 1971) is a retired backstroke and butterfly swimmer from Bulgaria. He was a member of the Bulgarian National Swimming Team (four men and one woman) at the 1992 Summer Olympics in Barcelona, Spain. He placed 32nd in the Men's 100 metres Butterfly and 34th place in the Men's 100 metres Backstroke.
