= Chokri Boudchiche =

Tunisian wrestler

Personal information
- Nationality: Tunisian
- Born: 25 September 1963 (age 62)

Sport
- Sport: Wrestling

Chokri Boudchiche (born 25 September 1963) is a Tunisian wrestler. He competed in the men's freestyle 52 kg at the 1992 Summer Olympics.
