= Kim Sun-hak =

South Korean wrestler

Personal information
- Nationality: South Korean
- Born: 2 March 1973 (age 53)

Sport
- Sport: Wrestling

Kim Sun-hak (born 2 March 1973) is a South Korean wrestler. He competed in the men's freestyle 52 kg at the 1992 Summer Olympics.
