= Ilian Aleksandrov =

Bulgarian gymnast (born 1972)

- Илиян Василев Александров
- Full name: Iliyan Vasilev Aleksandrov
- Born: 1 January 1972 (age 54) Pernik, Bulgaria

Gymnastics career
- Discipline: Men's artistic gymnastics
- Country represented: Bulgaria

Iliyan Vasilev Aleksandrov (Bulgarian: Илиян Александров) (born 1 January 1972) is a Bulgarian gymnast. He competed in eight events at the 1992 Summer Olympics.
