= Svetlana Todorova =

Bulgarian gymnast (born 1974)

Personal information
- Nationality: Bulgarian
- Born: 19 October 1974 (age 50); Haskovo, Bulgaria

Sport
- Sport: Gymnastics

Svetlana Todorova (Bulgarian: Светлана Тодорова) (born 19 October 1974) is a Bulgarian gymnast. She competed at the 1992 Summer Olympics.
