= Diving at the 1992 Summer Olympics – Men's 3 metre springboard =

Men's 3 metre springboard at the Games of the XXV Olympiad

Medalists
1st place, gold medalist(s)		Mark Lenzi	United States
2nd place, silver medalist(s)		Tan Liangde	China
3rd place, bronze medalist(s)		Dmitri Sautin	Unified Team

The Men's 3 metre Springboard, also reported as springboard diving, was one of four diving events on the Diving at the 1992 Summer Olympics programme.

The competition was split into two phases:

1. Preliminary round
  The twelve divers with the highest scores advanced to the final.
2. Final
  Divers performed a set of dives to determine the final ranking.

== Results ==
Rank	Diver	Nation	Preliminary		Final
Rank	Diver	Nation	Points	Rank	Points
1st place, gold medalist(s)	Mark Lenzi	United States	409.11	2	676.53
2nd place, silver medalist(s)	Tan Liangde	China	426.39	1	645.57
3rd place, bronze medalist(s)	Dmitri Sautin	Unified Team	384.42	6	627.78
4	Michael Murphy	Australia	381.33	8	611.97
5	Kent Ferguson	United States	374.22	12	609.12
6	Jorge Mondragón	Mexico	384.45	5	604.14
7	Edwin Jongejans	Netherlands	383.13	7	581.40
8	Valery Statsenko	Unified Team	388.26	4	577.92
9	Joakim Andersson	Sweden	376.68	10	562.74
10	Albin Killat	Germany	392.10	3	556.35
11	Mark Rourke	Canada	379.32	9	540.66
12	Davide Lorenzini	Italy	375.57	11	527.73
13	David Bédard	Canada	372.54	13	Did not advance
14	Wei Lan	China	369.09	14	Did not advance
15	Bob Morgan	Great Britain	366.66	15	Did not advance
16	Simon McCormack	Australia	358.05	16	Did not advance
17	Fernando Platas	Mexico	355.47	17	Did not advance
18	Jan Hempel	Germany	353.85	18	Did not advance
19	Christian Styren	Norway	347.94	19	Did not advance
20	Evan Stewart	Zimbabwe	345.87	20	Did not advance
21	Isao Yamagishi	Japan	344.40	21	Did not advance
22	Niki Stajković	Austria	339.75	22	Did not advance
23	José Miguel Gil	Spain	336.84	23	Did not advance
24	Jürgen Richter	Austria	336.78	24	Did not advance
25	Dario di Fazio	Venezuela	332.43	25	Did not advance
26	Alexei Kogalev	Belgium	323.46	26	Did not advance
27	Petar Trifonov	Bulgaria	320.82	27	Did not advance
28	Alessandro De Botton	Italy	312.69	28	Did not advance
29	Philippe Duvernay	France	310.14	29	Did not advance
30	Craig Vaughan	South Africa	297.51	30	Did not advance
31	Keita Kaneto	Japan	295.74	31	Did not advance
32	Grzegorz Kozdrański	Poland	228.06	32	Did not advance

== See also ==
- Diving at the 1991 World Aquatics Championships – Men's 1 metre springboard
- Diving at the 1991 World Aquatics Championships – Men's 3 metre springboard

== Sources ==
- Ed. Romà Cuyàs (ed.). Official Report of the Games of the XXV Olympiad: The Results (pdf) (in Spanish, Catalan, French, and English). Barcelona: COOB'92, S.A. (Barcelona'92 Olympic Organising Committee). pp. p. 382. ISBN 84-7868-283-X. OCLC 29247440.
