= Feiza Ben Aïssa =

Tunisian table tennis player

Personal information
- Nationality: Tunisian
- Born: 7 August 1963 (age 61)

Sport
- Sport: Table tennis

Feiza Ben Aïssa (born 7 August 1963) is a Tunisian table tennis player. She competed at the 1988 Summer Olympics and the 1992 Summer Olympics.
