= Chris Woodcroft =

Canadian wrestler (born 1965)

Personal information
- Born: March 14, 1965 (age 61) Hamilton, Ontario
Medal record
Men's Wrestling
Representing Canada
Commonwealth Games
Gold medal – first place	1986	Freestyle (– 52 kg)
Pan American Games
Silver medal – second place	1987 Indianapolis	Freestyle (– 57 kg)
Bronze medal – third place	1991 Havana	Freestyle (– 57 kg)

Christopher Woodcroft (born March 14, 1965, in Hamilton, Ontario) is a Canadian educator and retired wrestler. He was principal of Resurrection Catholic Secondary School in Kitchener, Ontario, and was one of 40 Canadian educators to receive the Canada's Outstanding Principal award from The Learning Partnership in January 2015.

Woodcroft represented Canada at the 1988 Summer Olympics in Seoul, South Korea and the 1992 Summer Olympics in Barcelona, Spain. He placed 11th in his class (52.0 kg Freestyle) at the 1994 World Championship. He won medals at the 1986 Commonwealth Games (gold), 1987 Pan American Games (silver), and 1991 Pan American Games (bronze).
