= Valentin Yordanov =

Bulgarian wrestler (born 1960)

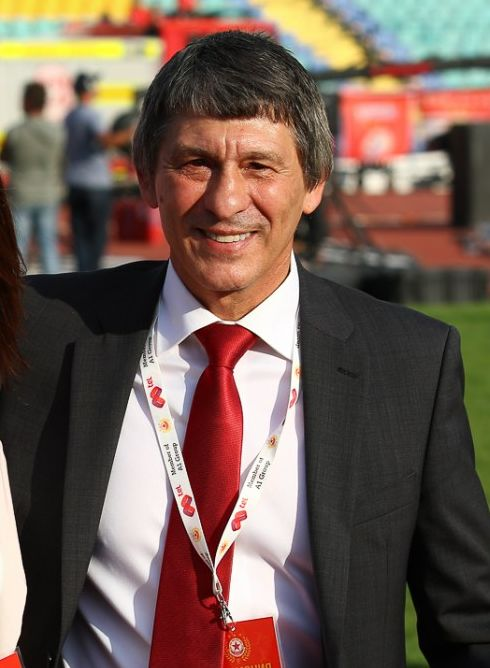
- Yordanov in 2018

Personal information
- Full name: Valentin Dimitrov Yordanov
- Nationality: Bulgarian
- Born: January 26, 1960 (age 66) Sandrovo, Ruse Municipality, Bulgaria
- Height: 156 cm (5 ft 1 in)

Sport
- Country: Bulgaria
- Sport: Freestyle Wrestling
- Weight class: 52 kg
Medal record
Men's freestyle wrestling
Representing Bulgaria
| Event | 1st | 2nd | 3rd |
|---|---|---|---|
| Olympic Games | 1 | - | 1 |
| World Championships | 7 | 2 | 1 |
| European Championships | 7 | 1 | 1 |
| Total | 15 | 3 | 3 |
Olympic Games
| Gold medal – first place | 1996 Atlanta | 52 kg |
| Bronze medal – third place | 1992 Barcelona | 52 kg |
World Championships
| Gold medal – first place | 1983 Kyiv | 52 kg |
| Gold medal – first place | 1985 Budapest | 52 kg |
| Gold medal – first place | 1987 Clermont-Ferrand | 52 kg |
| Gold medal – first place | 1989 Martigny | 52 kg |
| Gold medal – first place | 1993 Toronto | 52 kg |
| Gold medal – first place | 1994 Istanbul | 52 kg |
| Gold medal – first place | 1995 Atlanta | 52 kg |
| Silver medal – second place | 1990 Tokyo | 52 kg |
| Silver medal – second place | 1991 Varna | 52 kg |
| Bronze medal – third place | 1986 Budapest | 52 kg |
Goodwill Games
| Gold medal – first place | 1990 Seattle | 52 kg |
European Championships
| Gold medal – first place | 1989 Ankara | 52 kg |
| Gold medal – first place | 1988 Manchester | 52 kg |
| Gold medal – first place | 1987 Veliko Tyrnowo | 52 kg |
| Gold medal – first place | 1986 Piraeus | 52 kg |
| Gold medal – first place | 1985 Leipzig | 52 kg |
| Gold medal – first place | 1983 Budapest | 52 kg |
| Gold medal – first place | 1982 Varna | 52 kg |
| Silver medal – second place | 1984 Joenkoeping | 52 kg |
| Bronze medal – third place | 1981 Lodz | 52 kg |

Valentin Dimitrov Yordanov (Bulgarian: Валентин Димитров Йорданов; born January 26, 1960), also transliterated Jordanov, is a retired Bulgarian freestyle wrestler who competed in the up to 52 kg weight class. He is an Olympic gold medalist, seven-time World Champion, seven-time European Champion, and the only wrestler to hold 10 medals (seven gold, two silver and one bronze) from the World Wrestling Championships.

== Early life ==
He was born in the Bulgarian village of Sandrovo in the Ruse Municipality. He began wrestling at the age of 10, and was coached by Georgi Achev from 1970 to 1978. He did his military service at the sports school of the CSKA Sofia sports club from 1978 to 1980, where he worked with Yancho Patrikov.

He won his first European championship in 1980 in Bursa, Turkey, and his first world championship in 1983 in Kyiv. He continued to work at the CSKA sports club until 1990. He was one of two people to be named the Bulgarian Sportsperson of the Year in 1989.

== Team Foxcatcher ==
In 1990, Yordanov emigrated to the United States, training and living at multi-millionaire John du Pont's Foxcatcher Farm in Pennsylvania while continuing to wrestle for Bulgaria. He won a bronze medal at the 1992 Barcelona Olympics in the Freestyle Flyweight 52 kg event and a gold medal in the same event at the 1996 Atlanta Olympics. Following his death in 2010, John du Pont's will bequeathed 80 percent of his estate to Yordanov and his relatives.

== Post-retirement ==
He retired from wrestling after the 1996 Olympics. In 1997 he became a member of the Athletes' Commission of FILA, and has been the President of the Bulgarian Wrestling Federation since 1998. He has been a member of the board of the Bulgarian Olympic Committee since 2000. He is married and has two children.

In 2010, multimillionaire John du Pont died in prison while serving his sentence for murder. du Pont's most recent will bequeathed 80 percent of his estate to Yordanov, his wife, Zdravka Moneta Atanosova Dimitrov, and their relatives. Du Pont had been a Forbes 400 member worth an estimated US$200 million in 1986, equivalent to $590 million in 2025. The Superior Court of Pennsylvania upheld a Delaware County Orphans Court order dismissing a challenge to the will from du Pont's family.

In 2013, Yordanov returned his 1996 Olympic gold medal in protest of the International Olympic Committee's decision to eliminate wrestling from the Olympics.
