= Petar Trifonov (diver) =

Bulgarian diver

Personal information
- Nationality: Bulgarian
- Born: 13 July 1972 (age 52)

Sport
- Sport: Diving

Petar Trifonov (born 13 July 1972) is a Bulgarian diver. He competed in the men's 3 metre springboard event at the 1992 Summer Olympics.
