= Ahmet Örel =

Turkish freestyle wrestler (born 1969)

Personal information
- Born: 5 January 1969 (age 57) Samsun, Turkey
- Height: 1.55 m (5 ft 1 in)

Sport
- Sport: Wrestling
- Event: Freestyle
- Club: İstanbul Büyükşehir Belediyespor
Medal record
Representing Turkey
European Championships
Gold medal – first place	1993 Istanbul	52 kg
Bronze medal – third place	1992 Kaposvar	52 kg
Mediterranean Games
Gold medal – first place	1991 Athens	52 kg

Ahmet Örel (born 5 January 1969) is a Turkish former freestyle wrestler who competed in the 52 kg category. He represented Turkey at international competitions and achieved significant success, including a gold medal at the European Championships and Mediterranean Games.

== Career ==
Ahmet Örel was born in Samsun, Turkey, in 1969. He started his wrestling career at İstanbul Büyükşehir Belediyespor. He represented Turkey at the 1992 Summer Olympics in Barcelona, finishing fifth in the men's freestyle 52 kg category.

In 1993, he won the gold medal at the European Wrestling Championships in Istanbul. He also claimed a bronze medal at the 1992 European Championships in Kaposvar. Örel also won a gold medal at the 1991 Mediterranean Games in Athens.

He placed fourth at the 1994 World Wrestling Championships and also finished fourth at the 1990 Wrestling World Cup.
