= Mohamed Naouar =

Tunisian wrestler

Personal information
- Nationality: Tunisian
- Born: 9 July 1965 (age 59)

Sport
- Sport: Wrestling

Mohamed Naouar (born 9 July 1965) is a Tunisian wrestler. He competed at the 1992 Summer Olympics and the 1996 Summer Olympics.
