= Zeke Jones =

American wrestler (born 1966)

Personal information
- Full name: Larry Lee Jones
- Born: December 2, 1966 (age 59) Ypsilanti, Michigan, US

Sport
- Country: United States
- Sport: Wrestling
- Events: Freestyle and Folkstyle
- College team: Arizona State
- Club: Sunkist Kids Wrestling Club
- Team: USA
- Coached by: Bobby Douglas
Medal record
Men's freestyle wrestling
Representing the United States
Olympic Games
Silver medal – second place	1992 Barcelona	52 kg
World Championships
Gold medal – first place	1991 Varna	52 kg
Bronze medal – third place	1995 Atlanta	52 kg
Pan American Games
Gold medal – first place	1995 Mar del Plata	52 kg
Bronze medal – third place	1991 Havana	52 kg
Collegiate Wrestling
Representing the Arizona State Sun Devils
NCAA Division I Championships
Silver medal – second place	1990 College Park	118 lb

Larry Lee "Zeke" Jones (born December 2, 1966) is an American wrestler and coach. He won a silver medal at the 1992 Summer Olympics, won a world championship in 1991, and was the former freestyle head coach of USA Wrestling. He is currently the head coach of the Arizona State University wrestling team.

== Early life and college ==
Jones was born on December 2, 1966, in Ypsilanti, Michigan. He started wrestling under the influence of his brother Johnnie, a two-time junior college national champion for Schoolcraft Junior College and later a wrestler on Iowa State's national runner-up team in 1976. He was citywide champion at Scarlett Junior High School, in Ann Arbor, Michigan, where he was coached by James Bryant.

In high school, Jones amassed a 111-6 record, finishing second and first in the Michigan High School State Championships in 1984 and 1985 competing for Huron High School in Ann Arbor, Michigan. In high school he was coached by Tom Davids and Ernie Gillum. He was a three-time High School All-American at the Junior National Championships and was named Dream Team All-American selection by Wrestling USA Magazine in 1985. Jones was named to the Huron High School Hall of Fame in 2002.

Jones signed with Bobby Douglas and Arizona State in 1985. He compiled a 139-21 record while garnering three All-American honors at the NCAA's, three Pac-10 championships, and a Midlands Title, and was an NCAA finalist his senior year.

== Senior level ==
Jones was an Olympic silver medalist, the 1991 World Champion, a six-time U.S. national freestyle champion, a four-time World Cup champion, and a Pan American Games champion, and received the "World's Most Technical Wrestler Award" awarded by FILA, the international governing body for the sport during his career. In 2005, he was inducted into the National Wrestling Hall of Fame as a Distinguished Member.

== Coaching career ==
Jones served as the head coach of the 2012 US Olympic freestyle wrestling team. His first college coaching position was an assistant coach at Bloomsburg University, Arizona State University, and West Virginia University before becoming the head coach at the University of Pennsylvania in 2005. In April 2014, he was named head coach at Arizona State.

In 2008, Jones accepted the head coach position for the United States freestyle wrestling team with USA Wrestling at the Olympic Training Center in Colorado Springs, Colorado.
