= Institut Nacional d'Educació Física de Catalunya =

Sports venue in Barcelona, Spain

Coordinates: 41.3649°N 2.1471°E

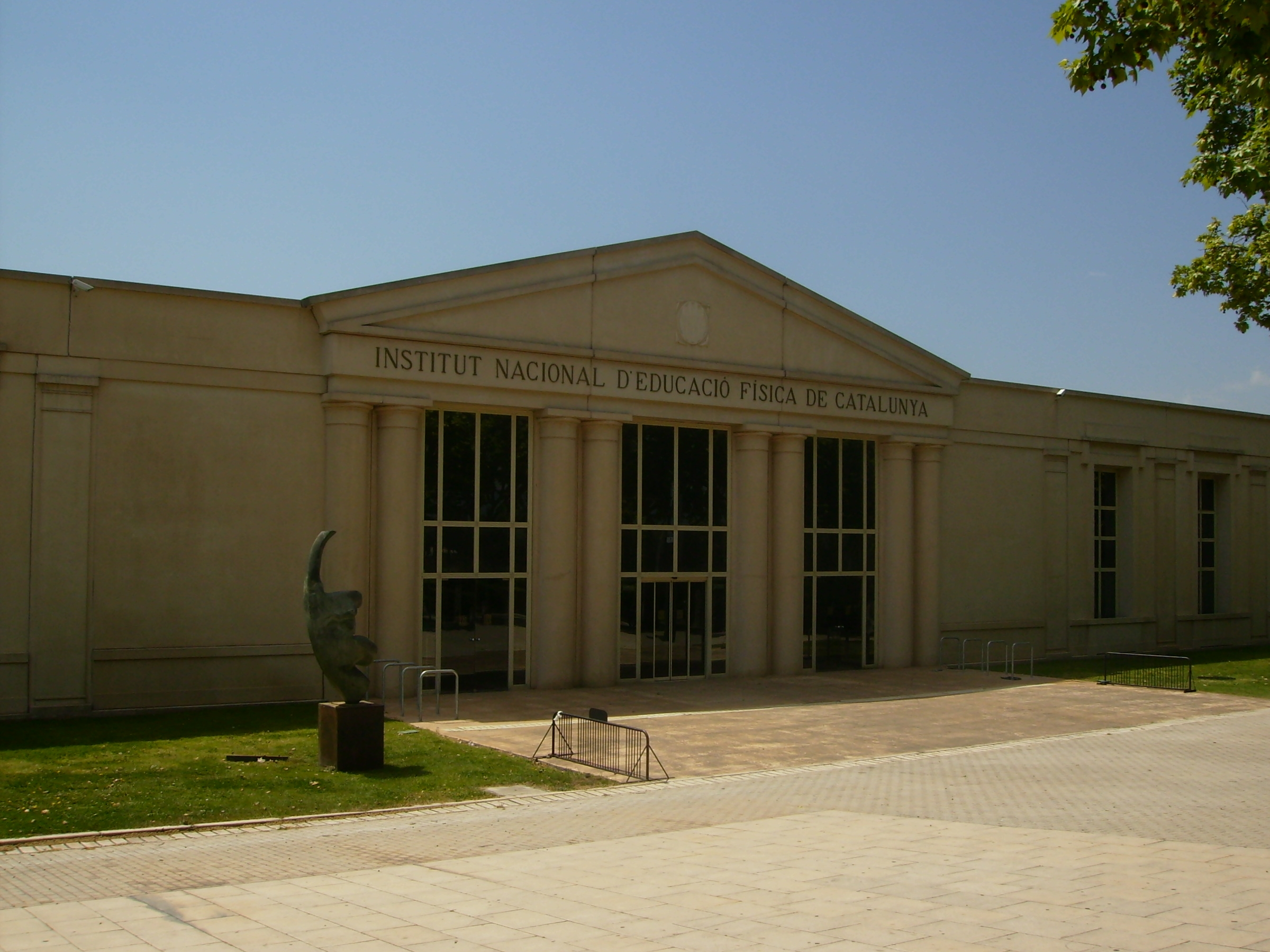
Entrance to the INEFC building.

The Institut Nacional d'Educació Física de Catalunya (English: National Institute of Physical Education of Catalonia, INEFC) is an indoor venue located in Barcelona. Renovated in 1991 on a design by Ricardo Bofill Taller de Arquitectura, it hosted the wrestling events for the 1992 Summer Olympics.

== See also ==
- Anella Olímpica
- List of works by Ricardo Bofill Taller de Arquitectura
