= Franz Marx =

Austrian wrestler

Franz Marx (born January 20, 1963) (not to be confused with the South African screenplay writer of the same name) is an Austrian sport wrestler. He was born in Innsbruck. Together with Anton Marchl he was one of the Austrian wrestlers, who qualified last for the Summer Olympic Games in Barcelona 1992.

== Successes ==
He was frequently the Austrian wrestling champion and participated two times at Summer Olympic Games. His greatest successes were a gold medal at the Junior World Championship in Colorado Springs and a bronze medal at the Wrestling World Championships 1981 in Oslo.

In 2002 he was honored as one of the most successful Austrian wrestlers by the city of Innsbruck. He is still a member of AC Hötting sporting club.
