= 1992 Summer Olympics =

Multi-sport event in Barcelona, Catalonia, Spain

Coordinates: 41°21′51″N 2°09′08″E

Games of the XXV Olympiad
- Emblem of the 1992 Summer Olympics
- Location: Barcelona, Spain
- Motto: Friends for Life (Spanish: Amigos para siempre, Catalan: Amics per sempre)
- Nations: 169
- Athletes: 9,356 (6,652 men, 2,704 women)
- Events: 257 in 25 sports (34 disciplines)
- Opening: 25 July 1992
- Closing: 9 August 1992
- Opened by: King Juan Carlos I
- Closed by: IOC president Juan Antonio Samaranch
- Cauldron: Antonio Rebollo
- Stadium: Estadi Olímpic de Montjuïc

The 1992 Summer Olympics (Spanish: Juegos Olímpicos de Verano de 1992, Catalan: Jocs Olímpics d'estiu de 1992), officially the Games of the XXV Olympiad (Spanish: Juegos de la XXV Olimpiada, Catalan: Jocs de la XXV Olimpíada) and officially branded as Barcelona '92, were an international multi-sport event held from 25 July to 9 August 1992 in Barcelona, Catalonia, Spain. Beginning in 1994, the International Olympic Committee decided to hold the Summer and Winter Olympics in alternating even-numbered years. The 1992 Summer and Winter Olympics were the last games to be staged in the same year. These games were the second and last two consecutive Olympic games to be held in Western Europe after the 1992 Winter Olympics in Albertville, France, held five months earlier. It is also the second Olympic Games to be held in a Spanish-speaking country, following the 1968 Summer Olympics in Mexico City.

The 1992 Games received universal acclaim, with the organisation, volunteers, sportsmanship, and Spanish public being lauded in the international media. Some media describe the Barcelona Games as one of the best Olympics ever. The Games showed a renewed image of a democratic Spain and projected Barcelona and Catalonia to the world. Owing to the Games, the city of Barcelona was remarkably transformed. All the venues are still active, and the legacy of the 1992 Games was taken as an example for future Olympic events, such as London 2012.

The 1992 Summer Games were the first since the end of the Cold War, and the first unaffected by boycotts since the 1972 Summer Games. 1992 was also the first year South Africa was re-invited to the Olympic Games by the International Olympic Committee, after a 32-year ban from participating in international sport due to apartheid. The Unified Team (made up by the former Soviet republics without the Baltic states) topped the medal table, winning 45 gold and 112 overall medals.

== Host city selection ==
During the 1980's Barcelona was the second-largest city in Spain and the capital of the autonomous community of Catalonia; it is also the hometown of then-IOC president Juan Antonio Samaranch and the famous European club FC Barcelona. The city was also a host city of the 1982 FIFA World Cup. On 17 October 1986, Barcelona was selected to host the 1992 Summer Olympics over Amsterdam, which hosted the 1928 games; Belgrade, Yugoslavia; Birmingham, United Kingdom; Brisbane, Australia; and Paris, France, during the 91st IOC Session in Lausanne, Switzerland. New Delhi, India, had announced a bid for the games, but withdrew in March 1986. With 85 out of 89 members of the IOC voting by secret ballot, Barcelona won a majority of 47 votes. Samaranch abstained from voting. In the same IOC meeting, Albertville, France, won the right to host the 1992 Winter Games. Paris and Brisbane would eventually be selected to host the 2024 and 2032 Summer Olympics respectively.

Barcelona had previously bid for the 1936 Summer Olympics that were ultimately held in Berlin, Germany. As an anti-fascist response against the Games being organized by Nazi Germany, the Government of Catalonia and the newly elected Spanish Popular Front government advocated for the boycott of the Spanish Republic to the Berlin Games and the organization of an alternative games in Barcelona, known as the People's Olympiad. However, the same day of its planned inauguration (19 July), the Spanish Army carried out a coup d'état which led to the Spanish Civil War.

1992 Summer Olympics bidding results
City	Country	Round		
City	Country	1	2	3
Barcelona	Spain	29	37	47
Paris	France	19	20	23
Belgrade	Yugoslavia	13	11	5
Brisbane	Australia	11	9	10
Birmingham	Great Britain	8	8	—
Amsterdam	Netherlands	5	—	—

== Highlights ==
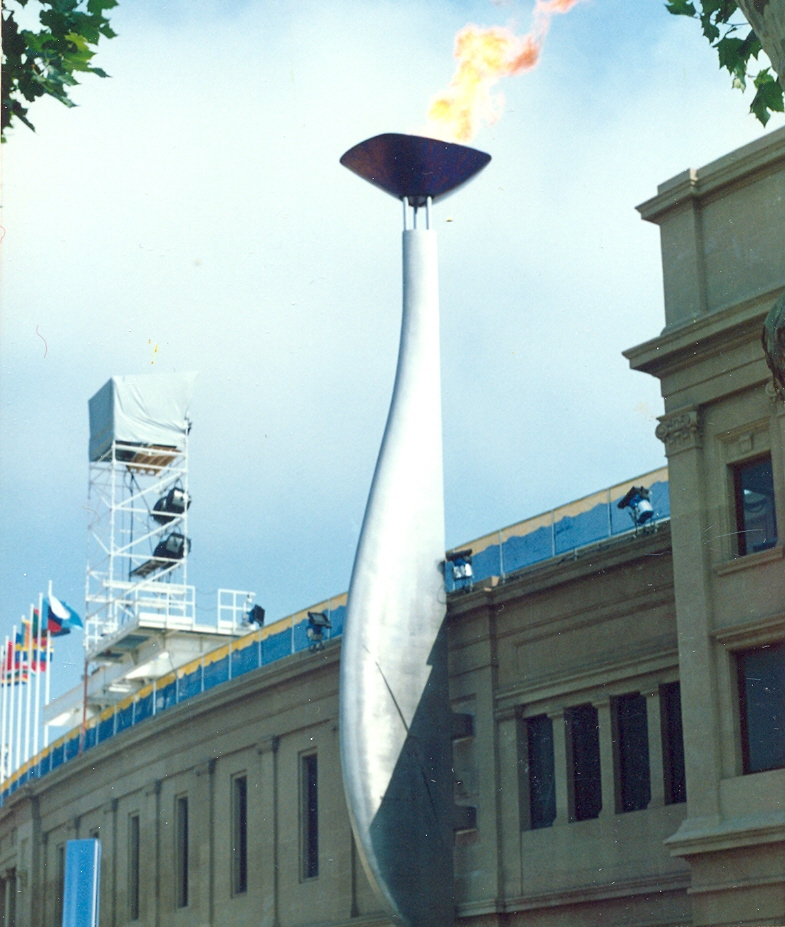
The Olympic cauldron lit during the Games in Montjuïc

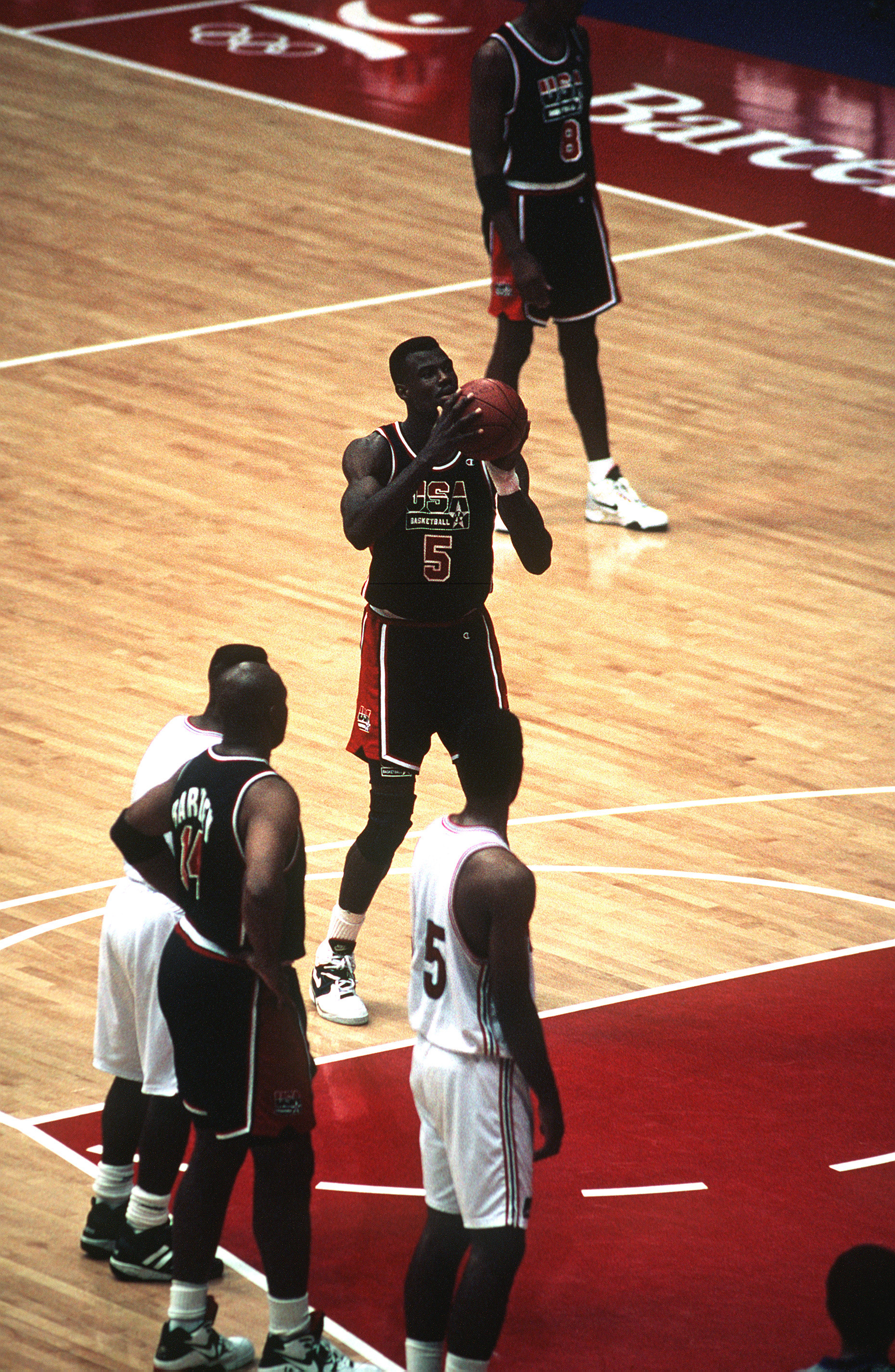
David Robinson shoots a free throw to help secure the gold medal for the United States "Dream Team".

- At the innovative opening ceremony, Greek mezzo-soprano Agnes Baltsa sang "Romiossini" as the Olympic flag was paraded around the stadium. Alfredo Kraus later sang the Olympic Hymn in Catalan, Spanish and French, as the flag was hoisted.
- The Olympic cauldron was ignited using a flaming arrow, lit from the flame of the Olympic torch. It was shot by Paralympic archer Antonio Rebollo, who aimed the arrow over the top of the cauldron to ignite the gas emanating from it. The arrow landed outside the stadium. This unusual method for lighting the cauldron had been carefully designed to avoid any chance of the arrow landing in the stadium if Rebollo missed his target.
- South Africa rejoined the Summer Olympics having been banned for its apartheid policy after the 1960 Summer Olympics. The women's 10,000 metres event was hotly contested. White South African runner Elana Meyer and black Ethiopian runner Derartu Tulu (winner) ran hand-in-hand in a victory lap.
- Germany sent a unified team having reunified in 1990, the last such team was at the 1964 Summer Olympics.
- As the Soviet Union was dissolved in 1991, the formerly Soviet-occupied states of Estonia and Latvia sent their own teams for the first time since 1936, while Lithuania sent its own team for the first time since 1928. The other former Soviet republics decided to compete together and formed the Unified Team, which consisted of present-day Armenia, Azerbaijan, Belarus, Georgia, Kazakhstan, Kyrgyzstan, Moldova, Russia, Tajikistan, Turkmenistan, Ukraine, and Uzbekistan. The Unified Team finished first in the medal standings, edging second-placed United States 112 to 108 in total medals and 45 to 37 in golds.
- The separation of the Socialist Federal Republic of Yugoslavia led to the Olympic debuts of Croatia, Slovenia and Bosnia and Herzegovina. Due to United Nations sanctions, athletes from the Federal Republic of Yugoslavia (consisting of present-day Serbia and Montenegro) were not allowed to participate with their own team. However, some individual athletes competed under the Olympic flag as Independent Olympic Participants. Serbia would return to the Olympics at the 2008 Summer Olympics and as well as Montenegro on what would be its Olympic debut as separate states.
- In basketball, the admittance of NBA players led to the formation of the "Dream Team" of the United States, featuring Michael Jordan, Magic Johnson, Larry Bird and other NBA stars. Prior to 1992, only European and South American professionals were allowed to compete, while the Americans used college players. The Dream Team won the gold medal and was inducted as a unit into the Basketball Hall of Fame in 2010.
- Fermín Cacho won the 1,500 m in his home country, earning Spain's first-ever Olympic gold medal in a running event.
- Chinese diver Fu Mingxia, age 13, became one of the youngest Olympic gold medalists of all time.
- In men's artistic gymnastics, Vitaly Scherbo from Belarus, (representing the Unified Team), won six gold medals, including four in a single day. Scherbo tied Eric Heiden's record for individual gold medals at a single Olympics, winning five medals in an individual event (Michael Phelps would later equal this record in 2008).
- In women's artistic gymnastics, Tatiana Gutsu took gold in the All-Around competition edging Shannon Miller.
- Russian swimmers (competing for the Unified Team) dominated the men's freestyle events, with Alexander Popov and Yevgeny Sadovyi each winning two events. Sadovyi also won in the relays.
- Evelyn Ashford won her fourth Olympic gold medal in the 4×100-metre relay, making her one of only four female athletes to have achieved this in history.
- The young Krisztina Egerszegi of Hungary won three individual swimming gold medals.
- In women's 200 m breaststroke, Kyoko Iwasaki of Japan won a gold medal at the age of 14 years and six days, making her the youngest-ever gold medalist in swimming competitions at the Olympics.
- Algerian athlete Hassiba Boulmerka, who was frequently criticized by Muslim groups in Algeria who thought she showed too much of her body when racing, received death threats and was forced to move to Europe to train, won the 1,500 metres, also holding the African women's record in this distance.
- After being demonstrated in six previous Summer Olympic Games, baseball officially became an Olympic sport. Badminton and women's judo also became part of the Olympic program, while slalom canoeing returned to the Games after a 20-year absence.
- Roller hockey, Basque pelota, and taekwondo were all demonstrated at the 1992 Summer Olympics.
- Several of the USA men's volleyball gold medal team from the 1988 Olympics returned to vie for another medal. In the preliminary round, they lost a controversial match to Japan, sparking them to shave their heads in protest of referees' decision to order a replay of two sets after an apparent U.S. victory. This notably included player Steve Timmons, sacrificing his trademark red flattop for the protest. The U.S. team ultimately progressed to the playoffs and won bronze, having lost the semifinals to eventual gold medallists Brazil, who were beginning to build their own dynasty in the sport.
- Mike Stulce of the United States won the men's shot put, beating the heavily favored Werner Günthör of Switzerland.
- On the 20th anniversary of the Munich massacre and the 500th anniversary of the Alhambra Decree, Yael Arad became the first Israeli to win an Olympic medal, winning a silver medal in judo. The next day, Oren Smadja became Israel's first male medalist, winning a bronze in the same sport.
- Derek Redmond of Great Britain tore a hamstring during a 400-meter semi-final heat. As he struggled to finish the race, his father entered the track without credentials and helped him complete the race, to a standing ovation from the crowd.
- Gail Devers came into the 100 meters hurdles as the favorite. Though her Olympic history shows her winning the 100 meters dash twice, the first time earlier in this Olympics, she primarily made her career as a hurdler. And true to form, Devers had a commanding lead in this race until the final hurdle. Devers came up short and hit the hurdle, foot first, hard, knocking her off balance. She stumbled toward the finish line, falling on the last step, but still finished fifth, .001 out of fourth place. Paraskevi Patoulidou of Greece won the gold medal to even her own disbelief, dropping to her knees on the track when she realized she had won.
- Jennifer Capriati won the singles tennis competition at the age of 16. She had previously earned a spot in the semifinals of two grand slams at the age of 14.
- Two gold medals were awarded in solo synchronized swimming after a judge inadvertently entered the score of "8.7" instead of the intended "9.7" in the computerized scoring system for one of Sylvie Fréchette's figures. This error ultimately placed Fréchette second, leaving Kristen Babb-Sprague for the gold medal. Following an appeal, FINA awarded Fréchette a gold medal, replacing her silver medal and leaving the two swimmers both with gold.
- Indonesia won its first-ever gold medal after winning a silver at 1988 Olympics. Susi Susanti won the gold in badminton women's singles after defeating Bang Soo-hyun in the final round. Alan Budikusuma won the badminton men's singles competition, earning a second gold medal for Indonesia. Several years later, both players married and they received the nickname golden couple or Olympic couple.

== Venues ==
Facilities of the 1992 Summer Olympics in Barcelona, L'Hospitalet de Llobregat, and Badalona. Navigate the map for other facilities.

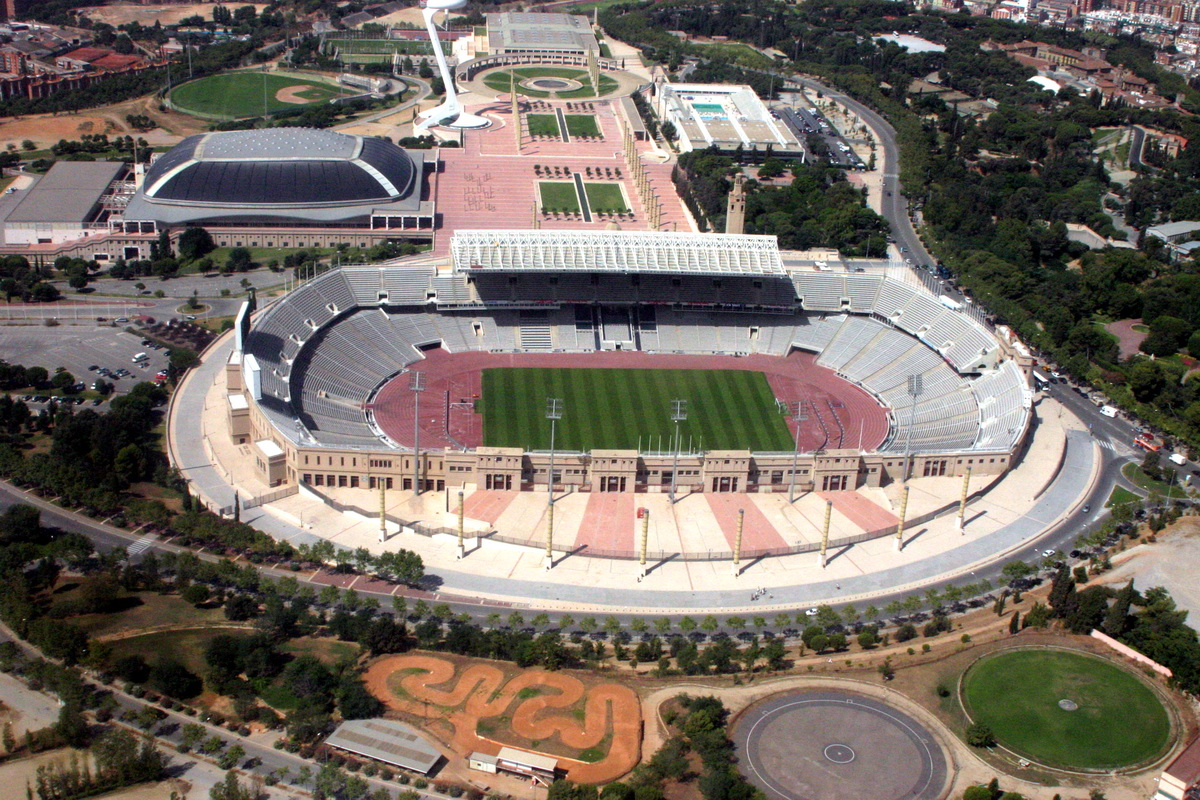
Anella Olímpica from above

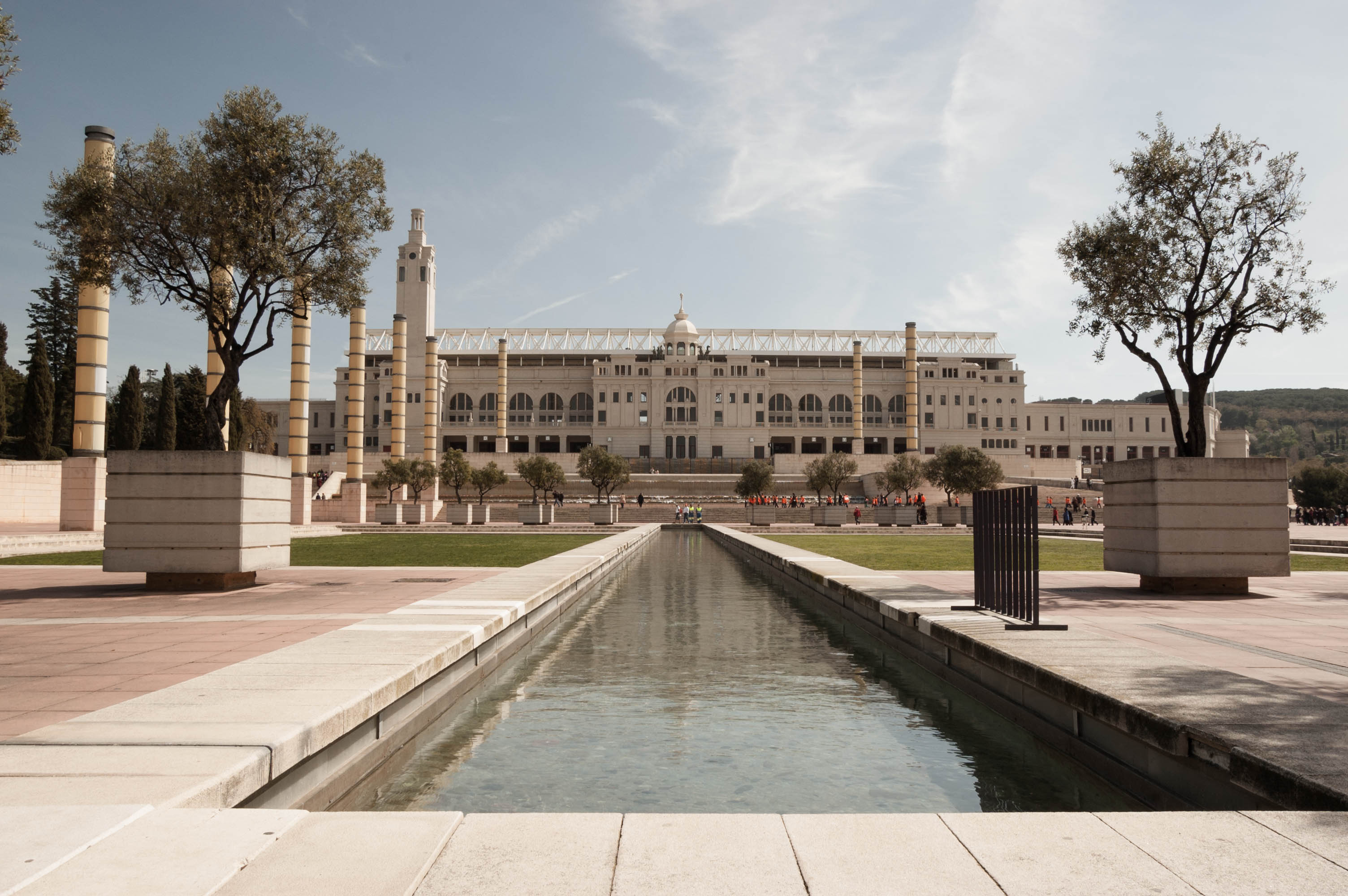
Estadi Olímpic de Montjuïc

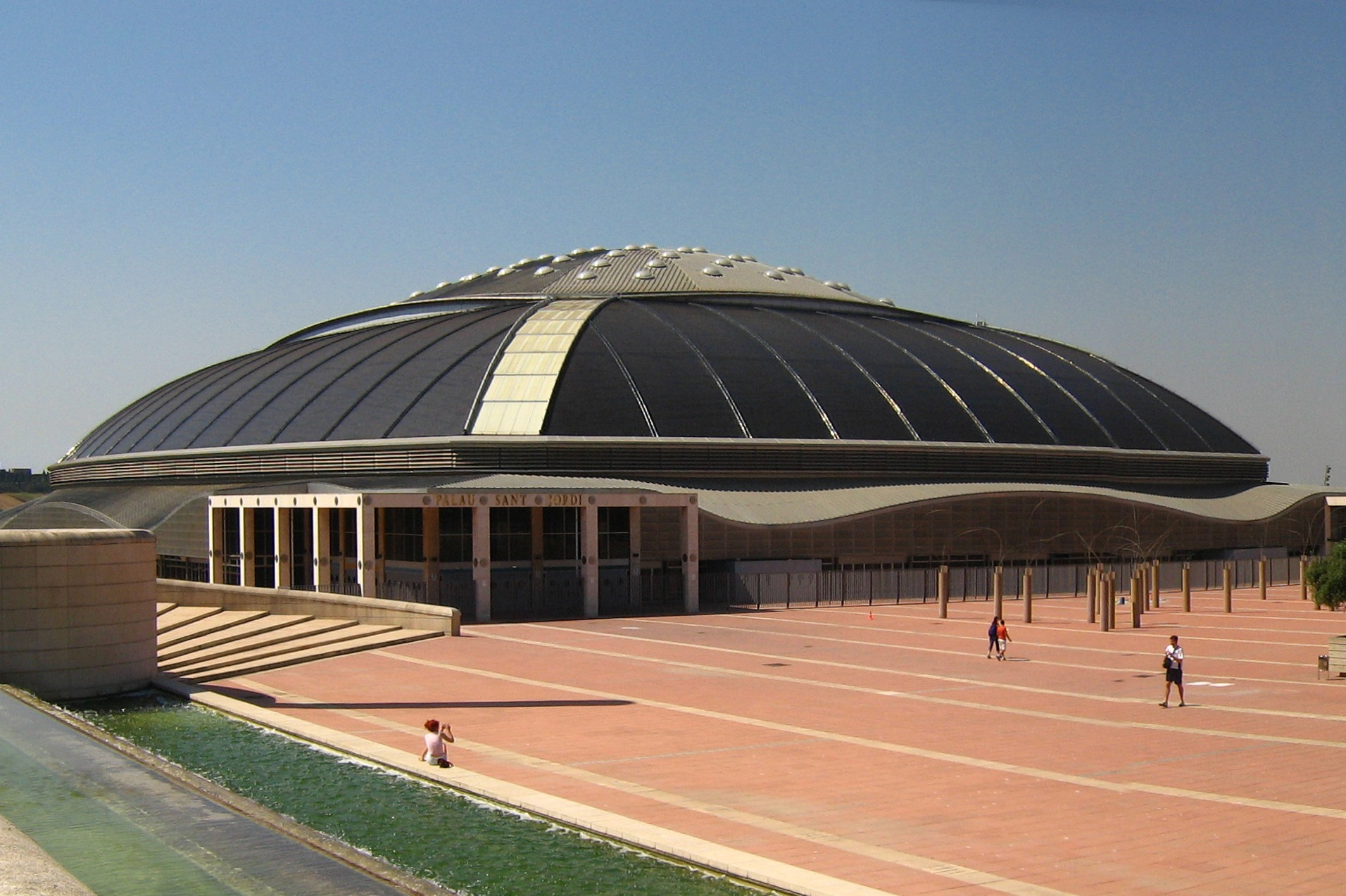
Palau Sant Jordi

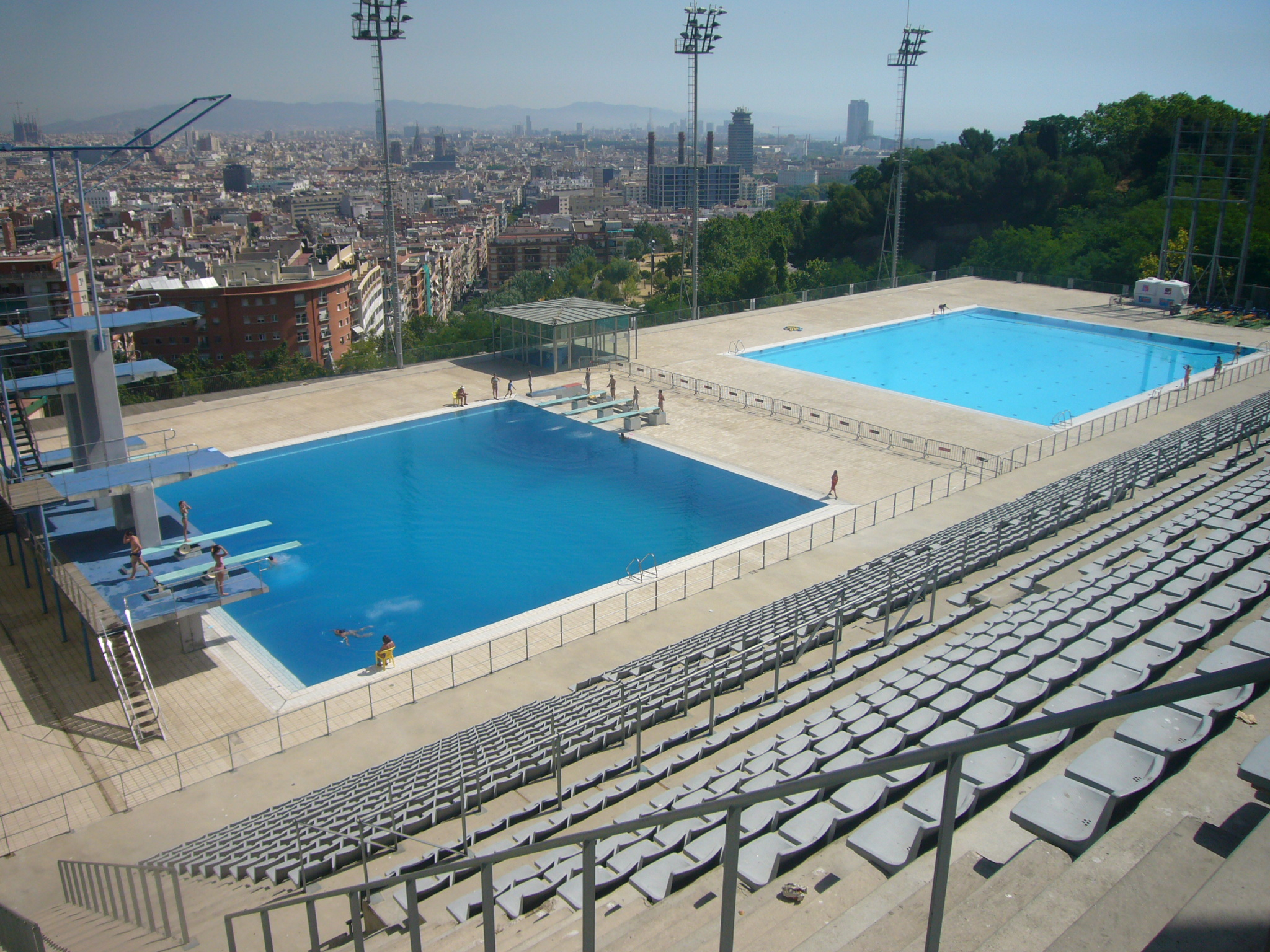
Piscina Municipal de Montjuïc

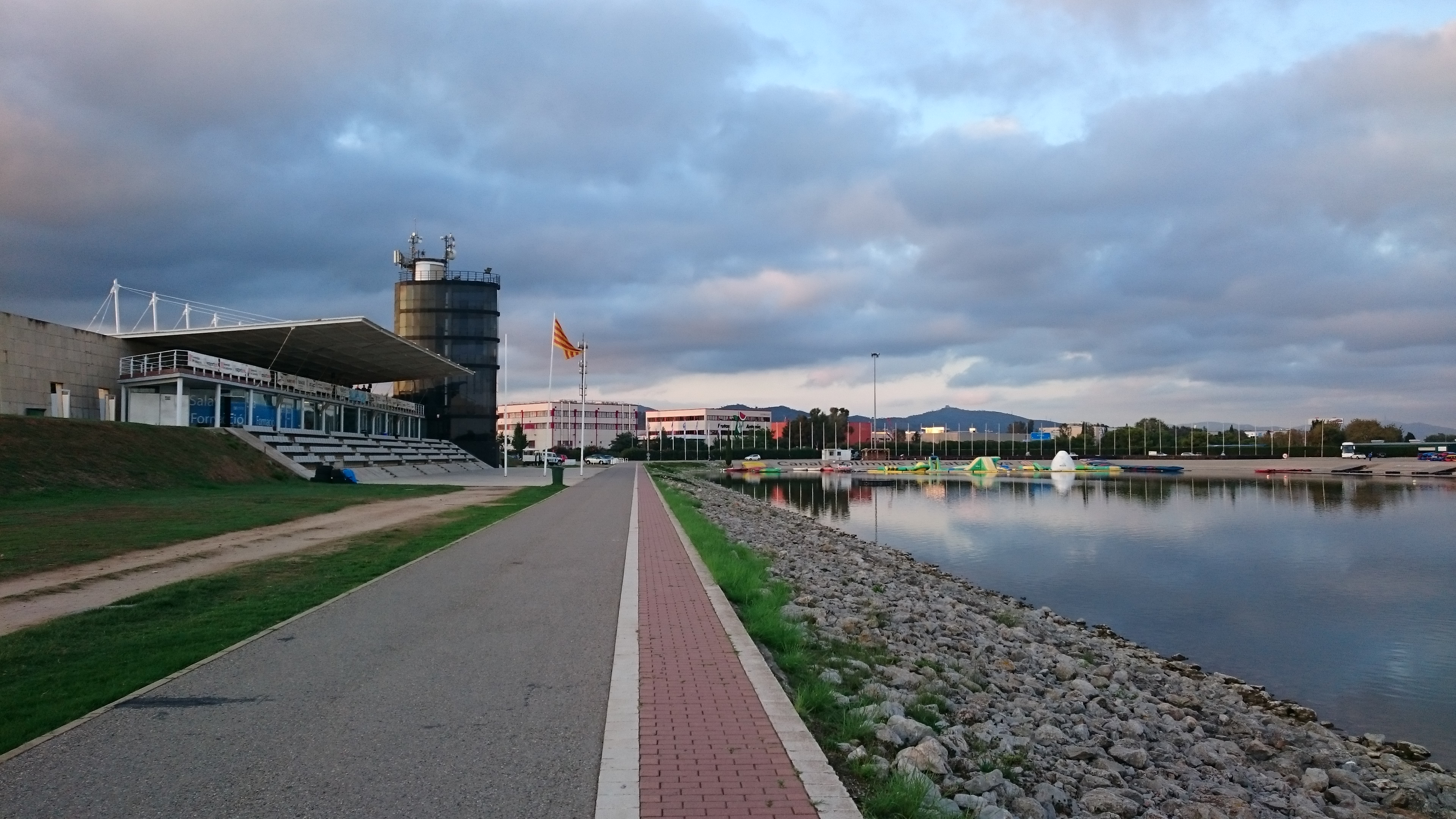
Canal Olímpic de Catalunya

- Montjuïc Area:
  - Cross-country course – modern pentathlon (running)
  - Estadi Olímpic de Montjuïc – opening/closing ceremonies, athletics
  - Palau Sant Jordi – gymnastics (artistics), volleyball (final), and handball (final)
  - Piscines Bernat Picornell – modern pentathlon (swimming), swimming, synchronized swimming, and water polo (final)
  - Piscina Municipal de Montjuïc – diving and water polo
  - Institut National d'Educació Física de Catalunya – wrestling
  - Mataró – athletics (marathon start)
  - Palau dels Esports de Barcelona – gymnastics (rhythmic) and volleyball
  - Palau de la Metal·lúrgia – fencing, modern pentathlon (fencing)
  - Pavelló de l'Espanya Industrial – weightlifting
  - Walking course – athletics (walks)
- Diagonal Area:
  - Camp Nou – football (final)
  - Palau Blaugrana – judo, roller hockey (demonstration final), and taekwondo (demonstration)
  - Estadi de Sarrià – football
  - Real Club de Polo de Barcelona – equestrian (dressage, jumping, eventing final), modern pentathlon (riding)
- Vall d'Hebron Area:
  - Archery Field – archery
  - Pavelló de la Vall d'Hebron – Basque pelota (demonstration) and volleyball
  - Tennis de la Vall d'Hebron – tennis
  - Velodrome – cycling (track)
- Parc de Mar Area
  - Estació del Nord Sports Hall – table tennis
  - Olympic Harbour – sailing
  - Pavelló de la Mar Bella – badminton
- Subsites
  - A-17 highway – cycling (road team time trial)
  - Banyoles Lake – rowing
  - Camp Municipal de Beisbol de Viladecans – baseball
  - Canal Olímpic de Catalunya – canoeing (sprint)
  - Circuit de Catalunya – cycling (road team time trial start/ finish)
  - Club Hípic El Montanyà – equestrian (dressage, eventing endurance)
  - Estadi de la Nova Creu Alta – football
  - Estadi Olímpic de Terrassa – field hockey
  - Estadio Luís Casanova – football
  - La Romareda – football
  - L'Hospitalet de Llobregat Baseball Stadium – baseball (final)
  - Mollet del Vallès Shooting Range – modern pentathlon (shooting), shooting
  - Palau D'Esports de Granollers – handball
  - Parc Olímpic del Segre – canoeing (slalom)
  - Pavelló Club Joventut Badalona – boxing
  - Pavelló de l'Ateneu de Sant Sadurní – roller hockey (demonstration)
  - Pavelló del Club Patí Vic – roller hockey (demonstration)
  - Pavelló d'Esports de Reus – roller hockey (demonstration)
  - Pavelló Olímpic de Badalona – basketball
  - Sant Sadurní Cycling Circuit – cycling (individual road race)
- Some events, including diving, took place in view of construction of the Sagrada Família

== Medals awarded ==
The 1992 Summer Olympic programme featured 257 events in the following 25 sports:

1992 Summer Olympics Sports Programme

- Aquatics
  - Diving (4)
  - Swimming (31)
  - Synchronized swimming (2)
  - Water polo (1)
- Archery (4)
- Athletics (43)
- Badminton (4)
- Baseball (1)
- Basketball (2)
- Boxing (12)
- Canoeing
  - Sprint (12)
  - Slalom (4)
- Cycling
  - Road (3)
  - Track (7)
- Equestrian
  - Dressage (2)
  - Eventing (2)
  - Show jumping (2)
- Fencing (8)
- Field hockey (2)
- Football (1)
- Gymnastics
  - Artistic (14)
  - Rhythmic (1)
- Handball (2)
- Judo (14)
- Modern pentathlon (2)
- Rowing (14)
- Sailing (10)
- Shooting (13)
- Table tennis (4)
- Tennis (4)
- Volleyball (2)
- Weightlifting (10)
- Wrestling
  - Freestyle (10)
  - Greco-Roman (10)

=== Demonstration sports ===
- Basque pelota (10)
- Roller hockey (quad) (1)
- Taekwondo (16)

== Participating National Olympic Committees ==
Participants at the 1992 Summer Olympics Participating for the first time. Having previously participated. Not participating. Yellow circle is host city (Barcelona)

Number of athletes

A total of 169 nations sent athletes to compete in the 1992 Summer Games.

With the dissolution of the Soviet Union, twelve of the fifteen new states chose to form a Unified Team, while the Baltic States of Estonia and Latvia sent their own teams for the first time since 1936, and Lithuania sent its own team for the first time since 1928. Bosnia-Herzegovina competed for the first time as an independent nation after its separation from Socialist Yugoslavia, and Namibia and the unified team of Yemen (previously North and South Yemen) also made their Olympic debuts. Croatia and Slovenia made their first Summer Olympic appearance at these games, having participated at the 1992 Winter Olympics in Albertville.

The 1992 Summer Olympics notably marked Germany competing as a unified team for the first time since 1964 and the first time since 1936 as a single nation following German reunification. South Africa returned to the Games for the first time in 32 years.

The Federal Republic of Yugoslavia was banned due to UN sanctions, but individual Yugoslav athletes were allowed to take part as Independent Olympic Participants. Four then-existing National Olympic Committees did not send any athletes to compete: Afghanistan, Brunei, Liberia and Somalia.

Participating National Olympic Committees
- Albania (7 athletes)
- Algeria (35)
- American Samoa (3)
- Andorra (8)
- Angola (28)
- Antigua and Barbuda (13)
- Argentina (84)
- Aruba (5)
- Australia (279)
- Austria (102)
- Bahamas (14)
- Bahrain (10)
- Bangladesh (6)
- Barbados (17)
- Belgium (68)
- Belize (10)
- Benin (6)
- Bermuda (20)
- Bhutan (6)
- Bolivia (13)
- Bosnia and Herzegovina (10)
- Botswana (6)
- Brazil (182)
- British Virgin Islands (4)
- Bulgaria (138)
- Burkina Faso (4)
- Cameroon (8)
- Canada (295)
- Cayman Islands (10)
- Central African Republic (15)
- Chad (6)
- Chile (12)
- China (244)
- Colombia (49)
- Republic of the Congo (7)
- Cook Islands (2)
- Costa Rica (16)
- Croatia (39)
- Cuba (176)
- Cyprus (17)
- Czechoslovakia (208)
- Denmark (110)
- Djibouti (8)
- Dominican Republic (32)
- Ecuador (13)
- Egypt (75)
- El Salvador (4)
- Equatorial Guinea (7)
- Estonia (37)
- Ethiopia (20)
- Fiji (18)
- Finland (88)
- France (339)
- Gabon (5)
- The Gambia (5)
- Germany (463)
- Ghana (34)
- Great Britain (371)
- Greece (70)
- Grenada (4)
- Guam (22)
- Guatemala (14)
- Guinea (8)
- Guyana (6)
- Haiti (7)
- Honduras (10)
- Hong Kong (38)
- Hungary (217)
- Iceland (27)
- India (52)
- Independent Olympic Participants (58)
- Indonesia (42)
- Iran (36)
- Iraq (8)
- Ireland (58)
- Israel (30)
- Italy (304)
- Ivory Coast (13)
- Jamaica (36)
- Japan (256)
- Jordan (4)
- Kenya (49)
- North Korea (64)
- South Korea (226)
- Kuwait (32)
- Laos (6)
- Latvia (34)
- Lebanon (12)
- Lesotho (6)
- Libya (5)
- Liechtenstein (7)
- Lithuania (47)
- Luxembourg (6)
- Madagascar (13)
- Malawi (4)
- Malaysia (26)
- Maldives (7)
- Mali (5)
- Malta (6)
- Mauritania (6)
- Mauritius (13)
- Mexico (102)
- Monaco (2)
- Mongolia (33)
- Morocco (44)
- Mozambique (6)
- Myanmar (4)
- Namibia (6)
- Nepal (2)
- Netherlands (201)
- Netherlands Antilles (4)
- New Zealand (134)
- Nicaragua (8)
- Niger (3)
- Nigeria (55)
- Norway (83)
- Oman (5)
- Pakistan (27)
- Panama (5)
- Papua New Guinea (13)
- Paraguay (27)
- Peru (16)
- Philippines (26)
- Poland (201)
- Portugal (90)
- Puerto Rico (71)
- Qatar (28)
- Romania (173)
- Rwanda (10)
- Saint Vincent and the Grenadines (6)
- San Marino (17)
- Saudi Arabia (9)
- Senegal (20)
- Seychelles (11)
- Sierra Leone (11)
- Singapore (14)
- Slovenia (35)
- Solomon Islands (1)
- South Africa (93)
- Spain (422) (host)
- Sri Lanka (11)
- Sudan (6)
- Suriname (6)
- Swaziland (6)
- Sweden (187)
- Switzerland (102)
- Syria (8)
- Chinese Taipei (31)
- Tanzania (9)
- Thailand (46)
- Togo (6)
- Tonga (5)
- Trinidad and Tobago (7)
- Tunisia (13)
- Turkey (41)
- Uganda (8)
- Unified Team (475)
- United Arab Emirates (13)
- United States (545)
- Uruguay (16)
- Vanuatu (6)
- Venezuela (26)
- Vietnam (7)
- Virgin Islands (25)
- Western Samoa (5)
- Yemen (8)
- Zaire (17)
- Zambia (9)
- Zimbabwe (19)
- Brunei participated in the Opening Ceremony, but its delegation consisted of only one official. This also occurred in the 1988 Games.
- Afghanistan did not send their athletes to compete, but the country took part in the Parade of Nations. Apparently, its flag was carried by a volunteer from the Barcelona Organising Committee.
- Liberia and Somalia also participated in the Opening Ceremony, but its accredited athletes (five and two, respectively) did not enter to compete.

=== Number of athletes by National Olympic Committee ===
9,356 athletes from 169 NOCs

IOC Letter Code	Country	Athletes
USA	United States	545
EUN	Unified Team	475
GER	Germany	463
ESP	Spain	422
GBR	Great Britain	371
FRA	France	339
ITA	Italy	304
CAN	Canada	295
AUS	Australia	279
JPN	Japan	256
CHN	China	244
KOR	South Korea	226
HUN	Hungary	217
TCH	Czechoslovakia	208
NED	Netherlands	201
POL	Poland	201
SWE	Sweden	187
BRA	Brazil	182
CUB	Cuba	176
ROM	Romania	173
BUL	Bulgaria	138
NZL	New Zealand	134
DEN	Denmark	110
AUT	Austria	102
MEX	Mexico	102
SUI	Switzerland	102
RSA	South Africa	93
POR	Portugal	90
FIN	Finland	88
ARG	Argentina	84
NOR	Norway	83
EGY	Egypt	75
PUR	Puerto Rico	71
GRE	Greece	70
BEL	Belgium	68
PRK	North Korea	64
IOP	Independent Olympic Participants	58
IRL	Ireland	58
NGR	Nigeria	55
IND	India	52
COL	Colombia	49
KEN	Kenya	49
LTU	Lithuania	47
THA	Thailand	46
MAR	Morocco	44
INA	Indonesia	42
TUR	Turkey	41
CRO	Croatia	39
HKG	Hong Kong	38
EST	Estonia	37
IRI	Iran	36
JAM	Jamaica	36
ALG	Algeria	35
SLO	Slovenia	35
GHA	Ghana	34
LAT	Latvia	34
MGL	Mongolia	33
DOM	Dominican Republic	32
KUW	Kuwait	32
TPE	Chinese Taipei	31
ISR	Israel	30
ANG	Angola	28
QAT	Qatar	28
ISL	Iceland	27
PAK	Pakistan	27
PAR	Paraguay	27
MAS	Malaysia	26
PHI	Philippines	26
VEN	Venezuela	26
ISV	Virgin Islands	25
GUM	Guam	22
BER	Bermuda	20
ETH	Ethiopia	20
SEN	Senegal	20
ZIM	Zimbabwe	19
FIJ	Fiji	18
BAR	Barbados	17
CYP	Cyprus	17
SMR	San Marino	17
ZAI	Zaire	17
CRC	Costa Rica	16
PER	Peru	16
URU	Uruguay	16
CAF	Central African Republic	15
BAH	Bahamas	14
GUA	Guatemala	14
SIN	Singapore	14
ANT	Antigua and Barbuda	13
BOL	Bolivia	13
ECU	Ecuador	13
CIV	Ivory Coast	13
MAD	Madagascar	13
MRI	Mauritius	13
PNG	Papua New Guinea	13
TUN	Tunisia	13
UAE	United Arab Emirates	13
CHI	Chile	12
LIB	Lebanon	12
SEY	Seychelles	11
SLE	Sierra Leone	11
SRI	Sri Lanka	11
BRN	Bahrain	10
BIZ	Belize	10
BSH	Bosnia and Herzegovina	10
CAY	Cayman Islands	10
HON	Honduras	10
RWA	Rwanda	10
KSA	Saudi Arabia	9
TAN	Tanzania	9
ZAM	Zambia	9
AND	Andorra	8
CMR	Cameroon	8
DJI	Djibouti	8
GUI	Guinea	8
IRQ	Iraq	8
NCA	Nicaragua	8
SYR	Syria	8
UGA	Uganda	8
YEM	Yemen	8
ALB	Albania	7
CGO	Republic of the Congo	7
GEQ	Equatorial Guinea	7
HAI	Haiti	7
LIE	Liechtenstein	7
MDV	Maldives	7
TRI	Trinidad and Tobago	7
VIE	Vietnam	7
BAN	Bangladesh	6
BEN	Benin	6
BHU	Bhutan	6
BOT	Botswana	6
CHA	Chad	6
GUY	Guyana	6
LAO	Laos	6
LES	Lesotho	6
LUX	Luxembourg	6
MLT	Malta	6
MTN	Mauritania	6
MOZ	Mozambique	6
NAM	Namibia	6
VIN	Saint Vincent and the Grenadines	6
SUD	Sudan	6
SWZ	Swaziland	6
TOG	Togo	6
VAN	Vanuatu	6
ARU	Aruba	5
GAB	Gabon	5
GAM	The Gambia	5
LBA	Libya	5
MLI	Mali	5
OMA	Oman	5
PAN	Panama	5
TGA	Tonga	5
WSM	Western Samoa	5
IVB	British Virgin Islands	4
BUR	Burkina Faso	4
ESA	El Salvador	4
GRN	Grenada	4
JOR	Jordan	4
MAW	Malawi	4
MYA	Myanmar	4
AHO	Netherlands Antilles	4
ASA	American Samoa	3
NIG	Niger	3
COK	Cook Islands	2
MON	Monaco	2
NEP	Nepal	2
SOL	Solomon Islands	1

== Calendar ==
All times are in Central European Summer Time (UTC+2)

OC	Opening ceremony	●	Event competitions	1	Gold medal events	CC	Closing ceremony

July/August 1992		July								August									Events
July/August 1992		24th Fri	25th Sat	26th Sun	27th Mon	28th Tue	29th Wed	30th Thu	31st Fri	1st Sat	2nd Sun	3rd Mon	4th Tue	5th Wed	6th Thu	7th Fri	8th Sat	9th Sun	Events
Ceremonies			OC															CC	—N/a
Aquatics	Diving			●	1	●	1			●	1	1	1						39
Aquatics	Swimming			4	5	5	5	6	6										39
Aquatics	Synchronized swimming										●	●		●	1	1			39
Aquatics	Water polo									●	●	●		●	●		●	1	39
Archery									●	●	1	1	2						4
Athletics									2	4	4	6		5	6	6	9	1	43
Badminton						●	●	●	●	●	●	●	4						4
Baseball				●	●	●	●		●	●	●		●	1					1
Basketball				●	●		●	●	●	●	●	●	●	●	●	1	1		2
Boxing				●	●	●	●	●	●	●	●	●	●		●	●	6	6	12
Canoeing	Slalom									2	2								16
Canoeing	Sprint											●	●	●	●	6	6		16
Cycling	Road cycling			2							1								10
Cycling	Track cycling				1	●	1	●	5										10
Equestrian						●	●	2	●		1		1	1	●	●		1	6
Fencing								1	1	1	1	●	1	1	1	1			8
Field hockey				●	●	●	●	●		●	●	●	●	●	●	1	1		2
Football		●		●	●	●	●	●		●	●			●		●	1		1
Gymnastics	Artistic					1	1	1	1	4	6								15
Gymnastics	Rhythmic														●		1		15
Handball					●		●	●	●	●	●	●	●		●	●	2		2
Judo					2	2	2	2	2	2	2								14
Modern pentathlon				●	●	●	2												2
Rowing					●	●	●	●	●	7	7								14
Sailing					●	●	●	●		●	2	7	1						10
Shooting				2	2	2	1	2	2	1	1								13
Table tennis						●	●	●	●	●	●	1	1	1	1				4
Tennis						●	●	●	●	●	●	●	●	●	●	2	2		4
Volleyball				●		●	●	●	●	●	●	●	●	●	●	●	1	1	2
Weightlifting				1	1	1	1		1	1	2	1							9
Wrestling				●	●	3	3	4				●	●	3	3	4			20
Daily medal events				9	12	14	17	19	19	22	30	18	11	12	12	22	30	10	257
Cumulative total				9	21	35	52	71	90	112	142	160	171	183	195	217	247	257	257
July/August 1992		24th Fri	25th Sat	26th Sun	27th Mon	28th Tue	29th Wed	30th Thu	31st Fri	1st Sat	2nd Sun	3rd Mon	4th Tue	5th Wed	6th Thu	7th Fri	8th Sat	9th Sun	Total events
July/August 1992		July								August									Total events

== Medal table ==
The following table reflects the top ten nations in terms of total medals won at the 1992 Games (the host nation is highlighted).

Key

‡ Changes in medal standings (see here)

* Host nation (Spain)

1992 Summer Olympics medal table
Rank	NOC	Gold	Silver	Bronze	Total
1	Unified Team‡	45	38	29	112
2	United States	37	34	37	108
3	Germany	33	21	28	82
4	China	16	22	16	54
5	Cuba	14	6	11	31
6	Spain*	13	7	2	22
7	South Korea	12	5	12	29
8	Hungary	11	12	7	30
9	France	8	5	16	29
10	Australia	7	9	11	27
11–64	Remaining NOCs	64	98	129	291
Totals (64 entries)		260	257	298	815

== Broadcasting ==
=== International signal ===
In order to guarantee that the international signal was produced objectively and impartially, for the first time in Olympic history, a host broadcaster was expressly created for each of the 1992 Olympic Games instead of delegating responsibility to a national host broadcaster. The Albertville Organizing Committee created the Organisme de radio télévision olympique '92 (ORTO'92) for the Winter Olympics and the Barcelona Organizing Committee created the Ràdio Televisió Olímpica '92 (RTO'92) for the Summer Olympics.

RTO'92 managed the staff and the production and technical resources hired to Radiotelevisión Española (RTVE), the Corporació Catalana de Ràdio i Televisió (CCRTV) and the European Broadcasting Union (EBU). With a workforce of 3,083 people, a permanent radio and television installation at the Olympic Stadium and Palau Sant Jordi, and over 50 mobile units for other venues, RTO'92 provided live coverage of all Summer Olympic sports for the first time ever –except for a few preliminary events–, some 2,800 hours of live television footage, to its international rights-holders. The International Broadcast Centre (IBC) was located at the exhibition halls of Fira de Barcelona in Montjuïc.

NHK and Panasonic developed the 1/2" DX digital system used to record the Games digitally for the first time. Also new were the underwater camera dolly on a track at the bottom of the swimming pool, the underwater microcameras at the bottom of the water polo pool, the periscope camera capable of transmitting shots from below and above the water, the overhead camera dolly on a track along the canopy of the Olympic Stadium for the 35 metres (115 ft) high zenithal shot of the athletics track, the stabilized optic gyro-zoom cameras, the super slow motion PAL camera and the microcamera on the high jump bar.

=== National coverages ===
To cover the Games, major international broadcasting unions such as the Asia-Pacific Broadcasting Union (ABU), the European Broadcasting Union (EBU), the International Radio and Television Organisation (OIRT), the Organización de Televisión Iberoamericana (OTI), the Arab States Broadcasting Union (ASBU), the Caribbean Broadcasting Union (CBU) and the Union of African National Television and Radio Organizations (URTNA), secured the rights for their member broadcasters in their countries. In other countries, broadcast networks secured the rights directly or pooled to secure the rights. The Games were covered by the following television and radio broadcasters:

Territory	Television	Radio
Algeria	ENTV	
Argentina	Channel 20; América TV; Telefe; Canal 13	
Australia	Seven Network	ABC
Austria	ORF	ORF
Belarus	btv	
Belgium	BRTN; RTBF	BRTN; RTBF
Brazil	Rede Bandeirantes; Rede Globo; SBT; Rede Manchete; TopSport	RB; Rádio Brasil Itália; Rádio Record
Bulgaria	BNT	
Canada	CTV; TVA	
Chile	UCTV; TVN	
China	CCTV	CPBS
Colombia	Canal A	RCN Radio; Caracol Radio; Inravisión
Croatia	HRT	HRT
Cuba	ICRT	ICRT
Cyprus	CyBC	
Czechoslovakia	ČST	Czechoslovak Radio
Denmark	DR	DR
Egypt	ERTU	ERTU
Estonia	ETV	
Finland	Yle	Yle
France	Antenne 2; FR3; TF1; Canal+	Radio France; Europe 1; RFI
Germany	ARD; RTL; ZDF	ARD
Greece	ERT	ERT
Hong Kong	HK-ATV (ATV Home and ATV World); HK-TVB (TVB Jade and TVB Pearl)	
Hungary	MTV	Magyar Rádió
Iceland	RÚV	RÚV
India	Doordarshan	
Indonesia	TVRI; RCTI; SCTV (relayed on RCTI); TPI (relayed on TVRI)	
Iran	IRIB	
Ireland	RTÉ	RTÉ
Israel	IBA	IBA
Italy	RAI	RAI
Japan	Japan Consortium	FM Hokkaidō; Nippon Cultural Broadcasting; Nippon Broadcasting System
Jordan	JRTV	
Lebanon	Télé Liban	
Libya	LJBC	
Lithuania	LTV	
Luxembourg	RTL	RTL
Macau	TDM	TDM
Malaysia	RTM (TV1 and TV2); STMB (TV3)	RTM
Malta	MBA	
Mexico	Televisa	
Monaco	RMC	RMC
Mongolia	MNB	
Morocco	RTM	RTM
Netherlands	NOS	NOS
New Zealand	TVNZ	RNZ
Norway	NRK	NRK
Pakistan	PTV	PBC
Philippines	ABS-CBN	DZBB 594 Radyo Bisig Bayan; DZSR Sports Radio 738
Poland	TVP	PR S.A.
Portugal	RTP	RDP
Puerto Rico	WIPR	
Romania	TVR	Radio România
Russia	Channel One; RTR	
Singapore	SBC 12	
Slovenia	RTVSLO	RTVSLO
South Africa	SABC	
South Korea	Korean Consortium; KBS; MBC; SBS	
Spain	TVE; Televisió de Catalunya	Catalunya Ràdio; Antena 3; COPE; RNE; Onda Cero; Cadena SER
Sweden	SVT	SR
Switzerland	SRG SSR; TSI	SRG SSR
Taiwan	TTV; CTV; CTS	
Thailand	Channel 3; Channel 5; Channel 7; Channel 9; Television Thailand Channel 11	
Tunisia	ERTT	
Turkey	TRT	TRT
United Kingdom	BBC One	BBC Radio 4
United States	NBC	
Venezuela	Venevisión	

=== HDTV coverage ===
The 1992 Winter and Summer Olympics were the first in which a comprehensive coverage in high-definition television (HDTV) was attempted. The European HDTV broadcast of the Summer Olympics was managed by the joint venture "Barcelona 1250" created by RTO'92, RTVE, Retevisión and PESA, with the financial support of the European Economic Community and a workforce of over 300 production and technical staff. A total of 225 hours and 45 minutes was broadcast in analog HD-MAC standard in 1,250 lines and 16:9 aspect ratio, with commentary in five languages –Spanish, English, French, German and Italian– in addition to the non-commentary sound track, of eighteen different sports at seventeen venues, as well as the opening and closing ceremonies. Events from five venues were covered live –80% of the total broadcast time– and other events were recorded for a delayed broadcast. On-screen text and graphics were shown in HDTV for the first time ever. Nearly 700 viewing sites installed throughout Europe, including the fifty HDTV receivers installed in various pavilions at the Seville Universal Exposition, were able to receive the broadcast.

For Japan, NHK also covered the 1992 Summer Olympics in HDTV in their own analog Hi-Vision system.

== Political controversies and terrorism ==
On the eve of the Olympics, between 29 June and 14 July 1992, the Spanish police operation later known as "Operation Garzón" saw the arrest of 45 Catalan pro-independence activists, journalists and politicians, under the accusation of belonging to the armed Catalan pro-independence and socialist organisation Terra Lliure (which already announced its dissolution in 1991), many of them without real proof. 25 of the arrested were kept in solitary confinement. They denounced torture at the hands of the Spanish police and threats of violence and rape to them and their families, as well as constant Anti-Catalan and Catalanophobic insults.

Political activists argue that the Spanish State used the Operation Garzón as a tool, under the pretext of security during the Olympic Games, to weaken the left-wing branch of Catalan independence movement.

The Basque nationalist group ETA attempted to disrupt the Barcelona Games with terrorist attacks. It was already feared beforehand that ETA would use the Olympics to gain publicity for their cause in front of a worldwide audience. As the time of the Games approached, ETA committed attacks in Barcelona and the Catalonia region as a whole, including the deadly 1991 Vic bombing. On 10 July 1992, the group offered a two-month truce covering the Olympics in exchange for negotiations, which the Spanish government rejected. However, the Games went ahead successfully without an attack.

== Effect on the city ==
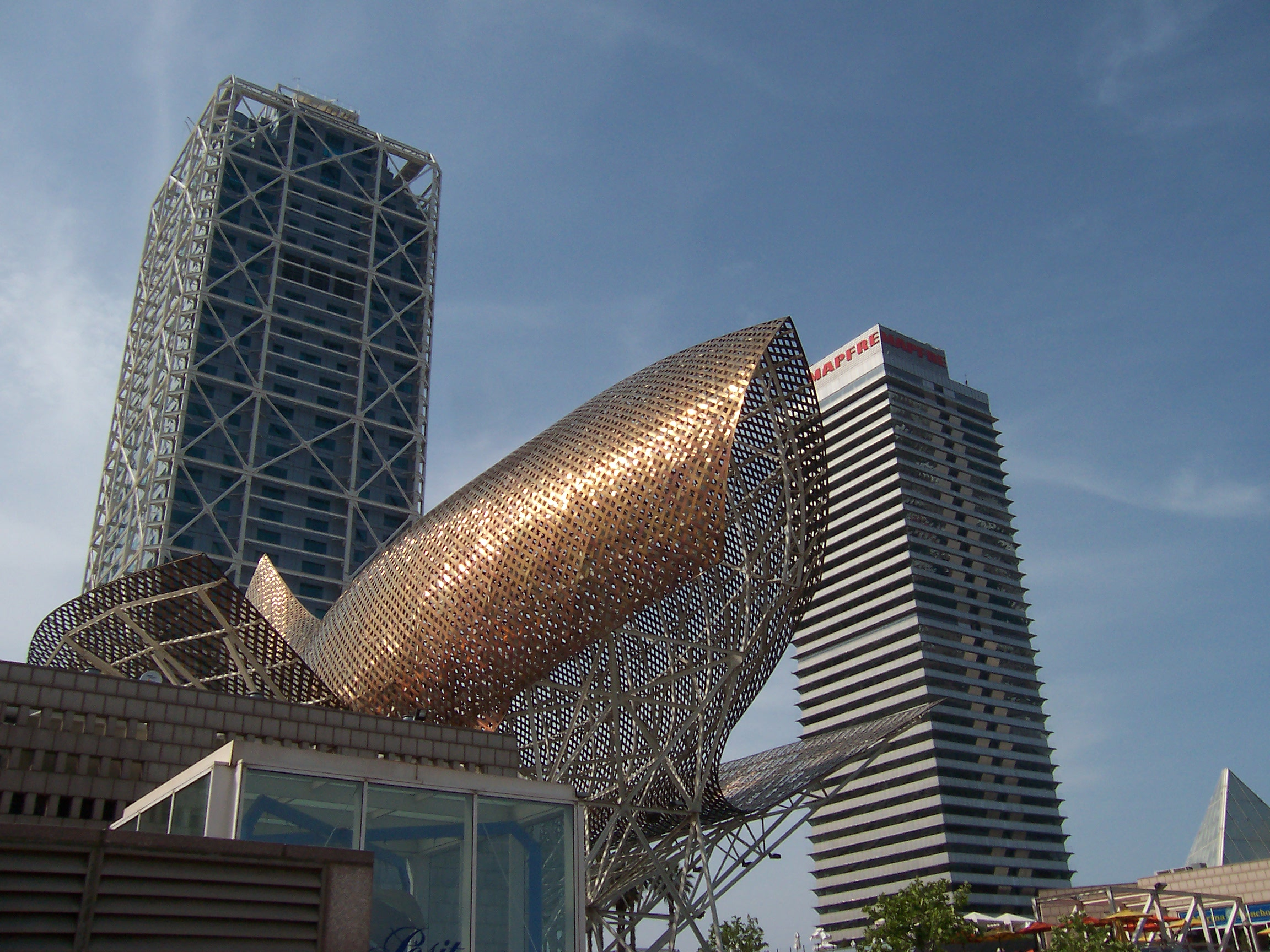
Frank Gehry's Fish sculpture in front of the Hotel Arts (left) and the Torre Mapfre (right) in the Olympic Village neighbourhood

The celebration of the 1992 Olympic Games had an enormous impact on the urban culture and outward projection of Barcelona, making it a prime example of how hosting a major sporting event can transform a city. The Games provided billions of dollars for infrastructure investments, which are considered to have improved the quality of life in the city, and its attraction for investment and tourism. Barcelona became one of the most visited cities in Europe after Paris, London, and Rome.

Barcelona's nomination for the 1992 Summer Olympics sparked the implementation of an ambitious plan for urban transformation that had already been developed previously. Barcelona was opened to the sea with the construction of the Olympic Village and Olympic Port in Poblenou. New centers were created, and modern sports facilities were built in the Olympic zones of Montjuïc, Diagonal, and Vall d'Hebron; hotels were also refurbished and new ones built. The construction of ring roads around the city helped to reduce traffic density, and El Prat airport was modernized and expanded with the opening of two new terminals.

=== Cost and cost overrun ===
The Oxford Olympics Study estimates the direct costs of the Barcelona 1992 Summer Olympics to be US$9.7 billion (expressed in 2015 U.S. dollars) with a cost overrun of 266%. This includes only sports-related costs, that is: (i) operational costs incurred by the organizing committee for the purpose of staging the Games, e.g., expenditures for technology, direct transportation, workforce, administration, security, catering, ceremonies, and medical services; and (ii) direct capital costs incurred by the host city and country or private investors to build the competition venues, the Olympic village, international broadcast center, media and press center, and similar structures required to host the Games. Costs excluded from the study are indirect capital and infrastructure costs, such as for road, rail, or airport infrastructure, or for hotel upgrades or other business investment incurred in preparation for the Games.

The costs for Barcelona 1992 may be compared with those of London 2012, which cost US$15 billion with a cost overrun of 76%, and those of Rio 2016 which cost US$4.6 billion with a cost overrun of 51%. The average cost for the Summer Olympics since 1960 is US$5.2 billion, with an average cost overrun of 176%.

== Songs and themes ==
There were two main musical themes for the 1992 Games. The first one was "Barcelona", a classical crossover song composed five years earlier by Freddie Mercury and Mike Moran; Mercury was an admirer of lyric soprano Montserrat Caballé, both recorded the official theme as a duet. Due to Mercury's death eight months earlier, the duo was unable to perform the song together during the opening ceremony. A recording of the song instead played over a travelogue of the city at the start of the opening ceremony, seconds before the official countdown. "Amigos Para Siempre" (Friends for Life) was the other musical theme and it was official theme song of the 1992 Summer Olympics. It was written by Andrew Lloyd Webber and Don Black, and sung by Sarah Brightman and José Carreras during the closing ceremonies.

Ryuichi Sakamoto composed and conducted some musical pieces at the opening ceremony musical score. The Opening Olympic fanfare was composed by Angelo Badalamenti and with orchestrations by Joseph Turrin.

== Mascot ==
The official mascot was Cobi, a Catalan sheepdog in cubist style designed by Javier Mariscal. He was widely featured in merchandising products and starred his own animated television series, The Cobi Troupe.

== Corporate image and identity ==
A renewal in Barcelona's image and corporate identity could be seen in the publication of posters, commemorative coins, stamps minted by the FNMT in Madrid, and the Barcelona 1992 Olympic Official Commemorative Medals, designed and struck in Barcelona.

== See also ==
- 1992 Summer Paralympics
- 1992 Winter Paralympics
- 1992 Winter Olympics
- List of IOC country codes
- Olympics Triplecast
- Use of performance-enhancing drugs at the 1992 Olympic Games
- Barcelona Gold – compilation album released for the 1992 Games
- Urban planning of Barcelona
- Seville Expo '92 – an international exhibition event held in Seville to commemorate the 500th anniversary of the discovery of the Americas.

Summer Olympics
Preceded by Seoul	XXV Olympiad; Barcelona; 1992	Succeeded by Atlanta
