= List of flag bearers for Syria at the Olympics =

Syria at the Olympics
- IOC code: SYR
- NOC: Syrian Olympic Committee
- Website: www.syriaolymp.org (in Arabic and English)
- Medals: Gold 1 Silver 1 Bronze 2 Total 4

Summer appearances
- 1948; 1952–1964; 1968; 1972; 1976; 1980; 1984; 1988; 1992; 1996; 2000; 2004; 2008; 2012; 2016; 2020; 2024

Other related appearances
- United Arab Republic (1960)

This is a list of flag bearers who have represented Syria at the Olympics.

Flag bearers carry the national flag of their country at the opening ceremony of the Olympic Games.

Summer Olympics
| Games | Athlete | Sport |
|---|---|---|
| 1948 London | Zouheir Shourbagi | Diving |
| 1952 Helsinki | did not participate | |
| 1956 Melbourne | did not participate | |
| 1960 Rome | as part of United Arab Republic (RAU) | |
| 1964 Tokyo | did not participate | |
| 1968 Mexico City | Mahmoud Balah | Wrestling |
| 1972 Munich | Mounzer Khatib | Shooting |
| 1976 Montreal | did not participate | |
| 1980 Moscow | Jihad Naim | Shooting |
| 1984 Los Angeles | Joseph Atiyeh | Wrestling |
| 1988 Seoul | Hafez El-Hussein | Athletics |
| 1992 Barcelona | Dennis Atiyeh | Wrestling |
| 1996 Atlanta | Ghada Shouaa | Athletics |
| 2000 Sydney | Moutassem Ghotouq | Head of mission |
| 2004 Athens | Mohammad Hazzory | Athletics |
| 2008 Beijing | Ahed Joughili | Weightlifting |
| 2012 London | Majd Eddin Ghazal | Athletics |
| 2016 Rio de Janeiro | Majd Eddin Ghazal | Athletics |
| 2020 Tokyo | Ahmad Hamcho; Hend Zaza | Equestrian; Table tennis |
| 2024 Paris | Amre Hamcho; Alisar Youssef | Equestrian; Athletics |

== See also ==
- Syria at the Olympics
