= Syria at the Olympics =

- IOC code: SYR
- NOC: Syrian Olympic Committee
- Website: www.syriaolymp.org (in Arabic and English)
- Medals Ranked 107th: Gold 1 Silver 1 Bronze 2 Total 4

Summer appearances
- 1948; 1952–1964; 1968; 1972; 1976; 1980; 1984; 1988; 1992; 1996; 2000; 2004; 2008; 2012; 2016; 2020; 2024

Other related appearances
- United Arab Republic (1960)

Syria first participated at the Olympic Games in 1948. Syrian diver Zouheir Shourbagi, the sole competitor, placed 10th in the men's platform. Syria then missed the next four Olympiads (though in 1960 the nation competed with Egypt as part of the United Arab Republic). Syria returned to the Games in 1968, and has sent athletes to compete in all but one Summer Olympic Games, missing the 1976 Games. The nation has never participated in the Winter Olympic Games.

The National Olympic Committee of Syria was created in 1948 and recognized by the International Olympic Committee (IOC) on 31 January 1948, at the IOC Session in Sankt Moritz. Syrian athletes have won a total of four medals, in four sports: Athletics, Freestyle wrestling, Weightlifting and Boxing.

== History ==
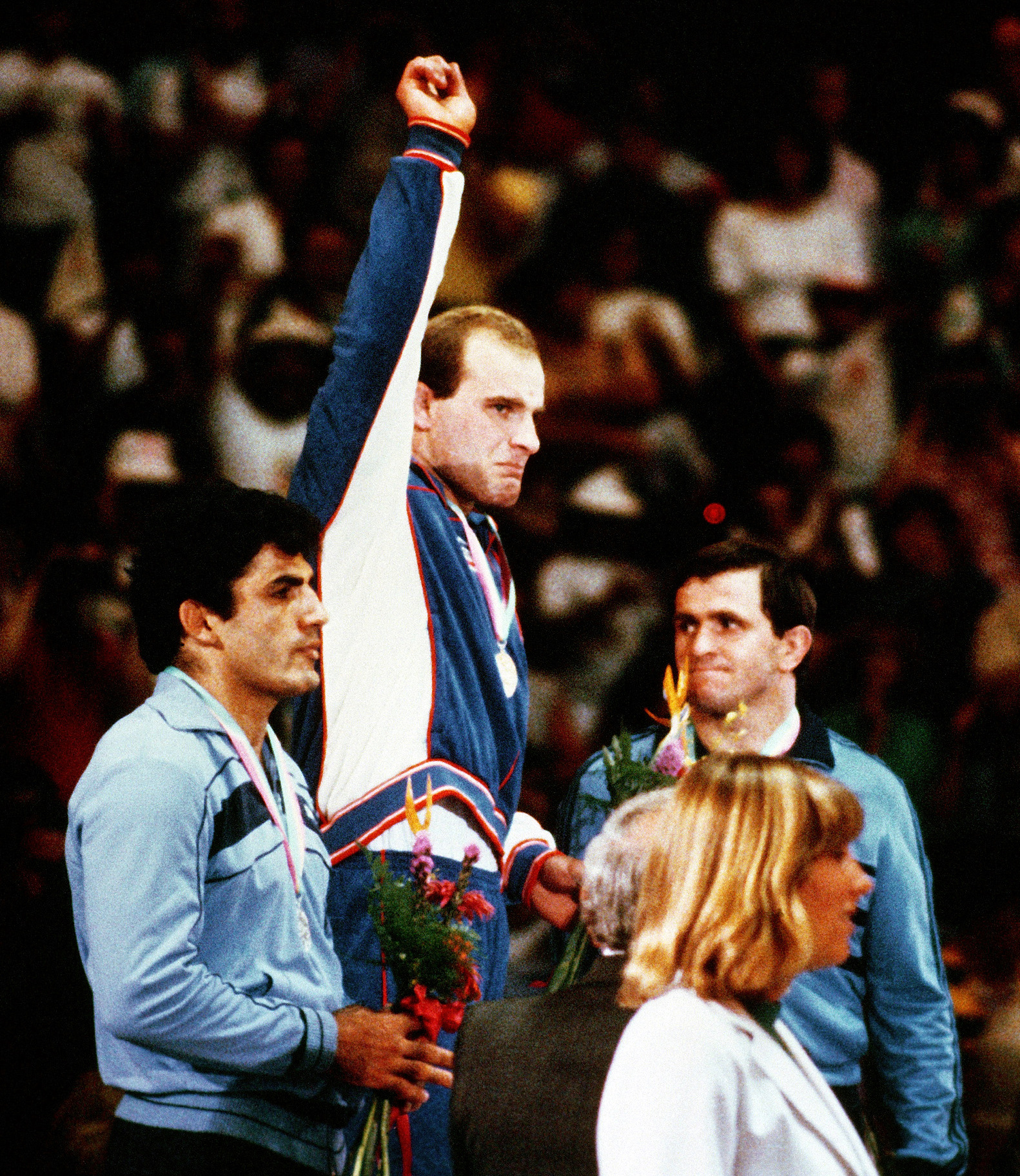
Freestyle wrestling 100 kg medal ceremony at the 1984 Summer Olympics, Syrian silver medalist Joseph Atiyeh first from left.

Syria first participated as an independent nation at the 1948 Summer Olympics in London. At Rome in 1960, it participated as part of the United Arab Republic. It split its alliance with Egypt in 1961 and did not compete in Tokyo in 1964.

Syria returned to the Olympics in Mexico in 1968 for the first time and missed only at Montreal in 1976. At the 1984 Los Angeles Olympics, Syria had won its first Olympic medal when Joseph Atiyeh won silver in the freestyle wrestling. During the 1996 Olympics in Atlanta, Ghada Shouaa won Syria's first gold medal in heptathlon with a total of 6,780 points.

Syria also achieved the third medal in the 2004 Summer Olympic Games and it was a bronze medal by the national boxer Nasser al-Shami in the sport of boxing. Finally, the fourth medal was achieved by national weightlifter Man Asaad in the weightlifting competitions, as it was a bronze medal at the 2020 Summer Olympics in Tokyo, which were held in 2021 due to the COVID-19 pandemic.

== Medal tables ==
=== Medals by Summer Games ===
Games	Athletes	Gold	Silver	Bronze	Total	Rank
1948 London	1	0	0	0	0	–
1952 Helsinki	did not participate					
1956 Melbourne	did not participate					
1960 Rome	as part of United Arab Republic (RAU)					
1964 Tokyo	did not participate					
1968 Mexico City	2	0	0	0	0	–
1972 Munich	5	0	0	0	0	–
1976 Montreal	did not participate					
1980 Moscow	67	0	0	0	0	–
1984 Los Angeles	9	0	1	0	1	33
1988 Seoul	13	0	0	0	0	–
1992 Barcelona	9	0	0	0	0	–
1996 Atlanta	7	1	0	0	1	49
2000 Sydney	8	0	0	0	0	–
2004 Athens	6	0	0	1	1	71
2008 Beijing	8	0	0	0	0	–
2012 London	10	0	0	0	0	–
2016 Rio de Janeiro	7	0	0	0	0	–
2020 Tokyo	6	0	0	1	1	86
2024 Paris	6	0	0	0	0	–
2028 Los Angeles	future event					
2032 Brisbane	future event					
Total		1	1	2	4	107

=== Medals by sport ===
Sport	Gold	Silver	Bronze	Total
Athletics	1	0	0	1
Wrestling	0	1	0	1
Boxing	0	0	1	1
Weightlifting	0	0	1	1
Totals (4 entries)	1	1	2	4

== List of medalists ==
Medal	Name	Games	Sport	Event
Silver	Joseph Atiyeh	1984 Los Angeles	Wrestling	Men's freestyle 100 kg
Gold	Ghada Shouaa	1996 Atlanta	Athletics	Women's heptathlon
Bronze	Nasser Al Shami	2004 Athens	Boxing	Men's heavyweight
Bronze	Man Asaad	2020 Tokyo	Weightlifting	Men's 109+kg

== Flagbearers ==
Summer Olympics
Games	Athlete	Sport
1948 London	Zouheir Shourbagi	Diving
1952 Helsinki	did not participate	
1956 Melbourne	did not participate	
1960 Rome	as part of United Arab Republic (RAU)	
1964 Tokyo	did not participate	
1968 Mexico City	Mahmoud Balah	Wrestling
1972 Munich	Mounzer Khatib	Shooting
1976 Montreal	did not participate	
1980 Moscow	Jihad Naim	Shooting
1984 Los Angeles	Joseph Atiyeh	Wrestling
1988 Seoul	Hafez El-Hussein	Athletics
1992 Barcelona	Dennis Atiyeh	Wrestling
1996 Atlanta	Ghada Shouaa	Athletics
2000 Sydney	Moutassem Ghotouq	Head of mission
2004 Athens	Mohammad Hazzory	Athletics
2008 Beijing	Ahed Joughili	Weightlifting
2012 London	Majdeddin Ghazal	Athletics
2016 Rio de Janeiro	Majdeddin Ghazal	Athletics
2020 Tokyo	Ahmad Hamcho; Hend Zaza	Equestrian; Table tennis
2024 Paris	Amre Hamcho; Alisar Youssef	Equestrian; Athletics

== See also ==
- List of flag bearers for Syria at the Olympics
- Category:Olympic competitors for Syria
- Syrian Olympic Committee
- Syria at the Paralympics
- Syria at the Mediterranean Games
- Syria at the Asian Games
- Tiberius Claudius Patrobius
