= Syria at the 1968 Summer Olympics =

- IOC code: SYR (SIR used at these Games)
- NOC: Syrian Olympic Committee
- Website: www.syriaolymp.org (in Arabic and English)

in Mexico City
- Competitors: 2 (2 men) in 1 sport
- Flag bearer: Mahmoud Balah
- Medals: Gold 0 Silver 0 Bronze 0 Total 0

Summer Olympics appearances (overview)
- 1948; 1952–1964; 1968; 1972; 1976; 1980; 1984; 1988; 1992; 1996; 2000; 2004; 2008; 2012; 2016; 2020; 2024

Other related appearances
- United Arab Republic (1960)

Syria competed at the 1968 Summer Olympics in Mexico City, Mexico. It was the first time in 20 years that the nation participated in the Olympic Games.

== Competitors ==
The following is the list of number of competitors in the Games.

Sport	Men	Women	Total
Wrestling	2	0	2
Total	2	0	2

== Wrestling ==
Syria nominated 2 wrestlers.

Key:

- VT - Victory by Fall.
- Pt - Decision by Points.
- Os - Obvious Superiority.

Men's Greco-Roman

Athlete	Event	Round 1 Result	Round 2 Result	Round 3 Result	Round 4 Result	Round 5 Result	Round 6 Result	Rank
Ahmed Chahrour	−52 kg	Mohamed Salem (EGY); Draw	Leonel Duarte (POR); W ^{Pt}	Vladimir Bakulin (URS); L ^{VT}	did not advance			N/A
Mahmoud Balah	−78 kg	Toshiro Tashiro (JPN); W ^{Pt}	Peter Nettekoven (FRG); W ^{Pt}	did not advance				13
