= Syria at the 2020 Summer Olympics =

- IOC code: SYR
- NOC: Syrian Olympic Committee
- Website: www.syriaolymp.org (in Arabic and English)

in Tokyo, Japan July 23, 2021 – August 8, 2021
- Competitors: 6 in 6 sports
- Flag bearers (opening): Hend Zaza; Ahmad Hamcho
- Flag bearer (closing): N/A
- Medals Ranked 86th: Gold 0 Silver 0 Bronze 1 Total 1

Summer Olympics appearances (overview)
- 1948; 1952–1964; 1968; 1972; 1976; 1980; 1984; 1988; 1992; 1996; 2000; 2004; 2008; 2012; 2016; 2020; 2024

Other related appearances
- United Arab Republic (1960)

Syria competed at the 2020 Summer Olympics in Tokyo. Originally scheduled to take place from 24 July to 9 August 2020, the Games were postponed to 23 July to 8 August 2021, because of the COVID-19 pandemic. It was the nation's fourteenth appearance at the Summer Olympics since its debut in 1948.

The Syrian Olympic Committee sent a team of six athletes, five men and one woman, to compete in six different sports at the Games, matching the nation's roster size with Athens 2004. Thanks to Man Asaad, Syria won its first Olympic medal since the 2004 Olympics.

As well as the country's official representatives, a number of Syrians participated in the Refugee Olympic Team at the 2020 Summer Olympics, including judoka Muna Dahouk. Brothers Alaa Maso and Mohamad Maso, who had fled Syria in 2015 and have lived in Germany since 2016, both competed, Alaa for the Refugee Olympic Team, in the men's 50m freestyle. and Mohamad for the official Syrian team in the men's triathlon, coming 47th. The brothers embraced during the Parade of Nations in the opening ceremony.

== Medalists ==
Medal	Name	Sport	Event	Date
Bronze	Man Asaad	Weightlifting	Men's +109 kg	4 August

== Competitors ==
The following is the list of number of competitors in the Games.

Sport	Men	Women	Total
Athletics	1	0	1
Equestrian	1	0	1
Swimming	1	0	1
Table tennis	0	1	1
Triathlon	1	0	1
Weightlifting	1	0	1
Total	5	1	6

== Athletics ==
One Syrian athlete achieved the entry, by qualifying by world ranking, in the following track and field events:

Key

- Note–Ranks given for track events are within the athlete's heat only
- Q = Qualified for the next round
- q = Qualified for the next round as a fastest loser or, in field events, by position without achieving the qualifying target
- NR = National record
- N/A = Round not applicable for the event
- Bye = Athlete not required to compete in round

Field events

Athlete	Event	Qualification		Final	
Athlete	Event	Distance	Position	Distance	Position
Majd Eddin Ghazal	Men's high jump	2.21 SB	=19	Did not advance	

== Equestrian ==
Syria entered one jumping rider into the Olympic competition by finishing in the top two, outside the group selection, of the individual FEI Olympic Rankings for Group F (Africa & Middle East), marking the country's recurrence to the sport after an eight-year absence.

=== Jumping ===
Athlete	Horse	Event	Qualification		Final		
Athlete	Horse	Event	Penalties	Rank	Penalties	Time	Rank
Ahmad Hamcho	Deville	Individual	Eliminated		Did not advance		

== Swimming ==
Syria received a universality invitation from FINA to send one top-ranked swimmers in their respective individual events to the Olympics, based on the FINA Points System of June 28, 2021.

Athlete	Event	Heat		Semifinal		Final	
Athlete	Event	Time	Rank	Time	Rank	Time	Rank
Ayman Kelzi	Men's 200 m butterfly	1:59.57	32	Did not advance			

== Table tennis ==
Syria entered one athlete into the table tennis competition. 11-year-old Hend Zaza secured a berth in the women's singles with a gold medal victory at the 2020 West Asia Olympic Qualification Tournament in Amman, Jordan. She was the youngest competitor in any sport in the 2020 Olympics.

Athlete	Event	Preliminary	Round 1	Round 2	Round 3	Round of 16	Quarterfinals	Semifinals	Final / BM	
Athlete	Event	Opposition Result	Opposition Result	Opposition Result	Opposition Result	Opposition Result	Opposition Result	Opposition Result	Opposition Result	Rank
Hend Zaza	Women's singles	Liu (AUT); L 0–4	Did not advance							

== Triathlon ==
Syria entered one triathlete to compete at the Games after received the tripartite commission quotas.

Athlete	Event	Time						Rank
Athlete	Event	Swim (1.5 km)	Trans 1	Bike (40 km)	Trans 2	Run (10 km)	Total	Rank
Mohamad Maso	Men's	18:07	0:42	58:10	0:40	36:33	1:54:12	47

== Weightlifting ==
Syrian weightlifters qualified for one quota place at the games, based on the Tokyo 2020 Rankings Qualification List of 11 June 2021.

Athlete	Event	Snatch		Clean & Jerk		Total	Rank
Athlete	Event	Result	Rank	Result	Rank	Total	Rank
Man Asaad	Men's +109 kg	190	3	234	4	424	3rd place, bronze medalist(s)
