= Syria at the 1992 Summer Olympics =

- IOC code: SYR
- NOC: Syrian Olympic Committee
- Website: www.syriaolymp.org (in Arabic and English)

in Barcelona
- Competitors: 9 (8 men and 1 woman) in 4 sports
- Flag bearer: Farid Kharboutly
- Medals: Gold 0 Silver 0 Bronze 0 Total 0

Summer Olympics appearances (overview)
- 1948; 1952–1964; 1968; 1972; 1976; 1980; 1984; 1988; 1992; 1996; 2000; 2004; 2008; 2012; 2016; 2020; 2024

Other related appearances
- United Arab Republic (1960)

Syria was represented at the 1992 Summer Olympics in Barcelona, Catalonia, Spain by the Syrian Olympic Committee.

In total, nine athletes including eight men and one woman represented Syria in four different sports including athletics, shooting, swimming and wrestling.

== Competitors ==
In total, nine athletes represented Syria at the 1992 Summer Olympics in Barcelona, Catalonia, Spain across four different sports.

Sport	Men	Women	Total
Athletics	3	1	4
Shooting	1	0	1
Swimming	1	0	1
Wrestling	3	–	3
Total	8	1	9

== Athletics ==
In total, four Syrian athletes participated in the athletics events – Kheireldin Abeid in the men's 110 m hurdles, Moussa El-Hariri in the men's marathon, Zeid Abou Hamed in the men's 400 m hurdles and Ghada Shouaa in the heptathlon.

The heats for the men's 110 m hurdles took place on 2 August 1992. Abeid finished seventh in his heat in a time of 14.23 seconds and he did not advance to the quarter-finals..

The heats for the men's 400 m hurdles took place on 3 August 1992. Abou Hamed did not start his heat.

The men's marathon took place on 9 August 1992. El-Hariri completed the course in a time of two hours 47 minutes six seconds to finish 84th overall.

Athlete	Event	Qualification		Quarter-final		Semi-final		Final	
Athlete	Event	Result	Position	Result	Position	Result	Position	Result	Position
Kheireldin Abeid	110 m hurdles	14.23	7	did not advance					
Zeid Abou Hamed	400 m hurdles	DNS		did not advance					
Moussa El-Hariri	Marathon	—						2:47.06	84

The heptathlon took place on 1 and 2 August 1992. Shouaa completed all seven events and scored a total of 5,278 points to finish 25th overall.

Athlete	Event	100H	HJ	SP	200 m	LJ	JT	800 m	Final	Rank
Ghada Shouaa	Result	16.62	1.64	12.24	25.44	5.88	44.40	2:24.30	5278	25
Ghada Shouaa	Points	640	783	677	847	813	752	766	5278	25

== Shooting ==
In total, one Syrian athlete participated in the shooting events – Farid Kharboutly in the skeet.

The preliminary round for the skeet took place on 26 July 1992. Across the six rounds, Kharboutly scored 144 points. He did not advance to the final and finished joint 33rd overall.

Athlete	Event	Qualification		Semifinal		Final	
Athlete	Event	Points	Rank	Points	Rank	Points	Rank
Farid Kharboutly	Skeet	144	33	did not advance			

== Swimming ==
In total, one Syrian athlete participated in the swimming events – Hisham Al-Masri in the men's 400 m freestyle and the men's 1,500 m freestyle.

The heats for the men's 400 m freestyle took place on 29 July 1992. Al-Masri finished first in his heat in a time of four minutes 0.69 seconds which was ultimately not fast enough to advance to the finals.

The heats for the men's 1,500 m freestyle took place on 29 July 1992. Al-Masri finished first in his heat in a time of 15 minutes 54.41 seconds which was ultimately not fast enough to advance to the final.

Athlete	Event	Heat		Final B		Final A	
Athlete	Event	Time	Rank	Time	Rank	Time	Rank
Hisham Al-Masri	400 m freestyle	4:00.69	34	did not advance			
Hisham Al-Masri	1,500 m freestyle	15:54.41	22	did not advance			

== Wrestling ==
In total, three Syrian athletes participated in the wrestling events – Khaled Al-Faraj in the Greco-Roman −52 kg category, Ahmad Al-Osta in the freestyle −68 kg category and Mohammad Hassoun in the Greco-Roman −48 kg category.

The first round of the freestyle −68 kg took place on 3 August 1992. Al-Osta lost to Chris Wilson of Canada. The second round took place later the same day. Al-Osta lost to Gérard Sartoro of France and was eliminated from the competition.

Athlete	Event	Round 1	Round 2	Round 3	Round 4	Round 5	Round 6	Final / BM	
Athlete	Event	Opposition Result	Opposition Result	Opposition Result	Opposition Result	Opposition Result	Opposition Result	Opposition Result	Rank
Ahmad Al-Osta	−68 kg	Chris Wilson (CAN); L 2-3	Gérard Sartoro (FRA); L 0-1	did not advance					22

The first round of the Greco-Roman −52 kg took place on 26 July 1992. Al-Faraj received a bye in the first round. The second round took place later the same day. Al-Faraj lost to Min Kyung-gab of South Korea. The third round took place later the same day. Al-Faraj lost to Alfred Ter-Mkrtychyan of the Unified Olympic Team and was eliminated from the competition.

The first round of the Greco-Roman −48 kg took place on 27 July 1992. Hassoun received a bye in the first round. The second round took place later the same day. Hassoun lost to Pappu Yadav of India. The third round took place later the same day. Hassoun lost to Vincenzo Maenza of Italy and was eliminated from the competition.

Athlete	Event	Round 1	Round 2	Round 3	Round 4	Round 5	Round 6	Final / BM	
Athlete	Event	Opposition Result	Opposition Result	Opposition Result	Opposition Result	Opposition Result	Opposition Result	Opposition Result	Rank
Mohammad Hassoun	−48 kg	Bye	Pappu Yadav (IND); L 2-5	Vincenzo Maenza (ITA); L 0-15	did not advance				10
Khaled Al-Faraj	−52 kg	Bye	Min Kyung-gab (KOR); L 5-8	Alfred Ter-Mkrtychyan (EUN); L 1-4	did not advance				11
