= Syria at the 1988 Summer Olympics =

- IOC code: SYR
- NOC: Syrian Olympic Committee
- Website: www.syriaolymp.org (in Arabic and English)

in Seoul
- Competitors: 13 in 4 sports
- Flag bearer: Hafez El-Hussein
- Medals: Gold 0 Silver 0 Bronze 0 Total 0

Summer Olympics appearances (overview)
- 1948; 1952–1964; 1968; 1972; 1976; 1980; 1984; 1988; 1992; 1996; 2000; 2004; 2008; 2012; 2016; 2020; 2024; 2028

Other related appearances
- United Arab Republic (1960)

Syria competed at the 1988 Summer Olympics in Seoul, South Korea.

== Competitors ==
The following is the list of number of competitors in the Games.

Sport	Men	Women	Total
Athletics	1	–	1
Boxing	3	–	3
Weightlifting	1	–	1
Wrestling	8	–	8
Total	13	0	13

== Athletics ==
Key

- Note–Ranks given for track events are within the athlete's heat only
- Q = Qualified for the next round
- q = Qualified for the next round as a fastest loser or, in field events, by position without achieving the qualifying target
- NR = National record
- N/A = Round not applicable for the event
- Bye = Athlete not required to compete in round

Men
Field events

Athlete	Event	Qualification		Final	
Athlete	Event	Result	Position	Result	Position
Hafez Al-Hussein	Javelin throw	63.34	36	Did not advance	

== Boxing ==
Men

Athlete	Event	First round	Second round	Third round	Quarterfinals	Semifinals	Final	
Athlete	Event	Opposition Result	Opposition Result	Opposition Result	Opposition Result	Opposition Result	Opposition Result	Rank
Mohamed Haddad	Light flyweight	BYE	Maina (KEN); L 1-4	Did not advance				
Hamed Halbouni	Flyweight	Bredahl (DEN); W RSC-2	Agosto (PUR); L 0-5	Did not advance				
Ahmed Khanji	Light welterweight	BYE	Myrberg (SWE); L 1-4	Did not advance				

== Weightlifting ==
Men

Athlete	Event	Snatch		Clean & jerk		Total	Rank
Athlete	Event	Result	Rank	Result	Rank	Total	Rank
Mohamed Fayad	−90 kg	135.0	19	185.0	11	320.0	15

== Wrestling ==
Men's freestyle

Athlete	Event	Round 1	Round 2	Round 3	Round 4	Round 5	Round 6	Final / BM	
Athlete	Event	Opposition Result	Opposition Result	Opposition Result	Opposition Result	Opposition Result	Opposition Result	Opposition Result	Rank
Mohamed El-Messouti	−48 kg	BYE	Alfredo Marcuño (ESP); W 10-3	Tim Vanni (USA); L 1-13	Takashi Kobayashi (JPN); L 0-15	Did not advance			10
Amar Wattar	−68 kg	Edmundo Ichillumpa (PER); W 17-2	Gustavo Manzur (ESA); W 16-3	Essam El-Khodary (EGY); W 14-3	Amir Reza Khadem (IRI); L 1-17	Jukka Rauhala (FIN); L 0-12	Did not advance		10
Mohamad Zayar	−82 kg	Ubaldo Rodríguez (PUR); W 11-0	Martin Doyle (GBR); W 6-1	Victor Kodei (NGR); L 1-7	Jouni Ilomäki (FIN); L 5:08	Did not advance			14
Ahmed Al-Shamy	−90 kg	Kim Tae-woo (KOR); L 2-8	Bakary Sanneh (GAM); W TF 1:55	Makharbek Khadartsev (URS); L TF 2:47	Did not advance				16
Dennis Atiyeh	−130 kg	David Gobezhishvili (URS); L 0-17	BYE	Atanas Atanassov (BUL); L 0-15	Did not advance				12

Men's Greco-Roman

Athlete	Event	Round 1	Round 2	Round 3	Round 4	Round 5	Round 6	Final / BM	
Athlete	Event	Opposition Result	Opposition Result	Opposition Result	Opposition Result	Opposition Result	Opposition Result	Opposition Result	Rank
Khaled Al-Faraj	−48 kg	Víctor Capacho (COL); W TF 5:11	Mahaddin Allahverdiyev (URS); L 4-16	Goun Duk-Yong (KOR); W 8-5	Andrzej Głąb (POL); L 5-10	—N/a		Markus Scherer (FRG); W 16-6	5
Zouheir Hory	−68 kg	Herminio Hidalgo (PAN); L 4:25	Francisco Barcia (ESP); W 15-0	Morten Brekke (NOR); L 5:24	Did not advance				18
Zouheir Al-Balah	−74 kg	Kim Young-Nam (KOR); L 0-8	Hiromichi Ito (JPN); L 4:19	Did not advance					19
