= Syria at the 2008 Summer Olympics =

- IOC code: SYR
- NOC: Syrian Olympic Committee
- Website: www.syriaolymp.org (in Arabic and English)

in Beijing
- Competitors: 8 in 5 sports
- Flag bearer: Ahed Joughili
- Medals: Gold 0 Silver 0 Bronze 0 Total 0

Summer Olympics appearances (overview)
- 1948; 1952–1964; 1968; 1972; 1976; 1980; 1984; 1988; 1992; 1996; 2000; 2004; 2008; 2012; 2016; 2020; 2024; 2028

Other related appearances
- United Arab Republic (1960)

Syria competed in the 2008 Summer Olympics which was held in Beijing, People's Republic of China from 8 to 24 August 2008. This was the nation's eleventh appearance at the Olympics since its debut in 1948. The Syrian Olympic Committee sent eight athletes who took part in five sports in the games.

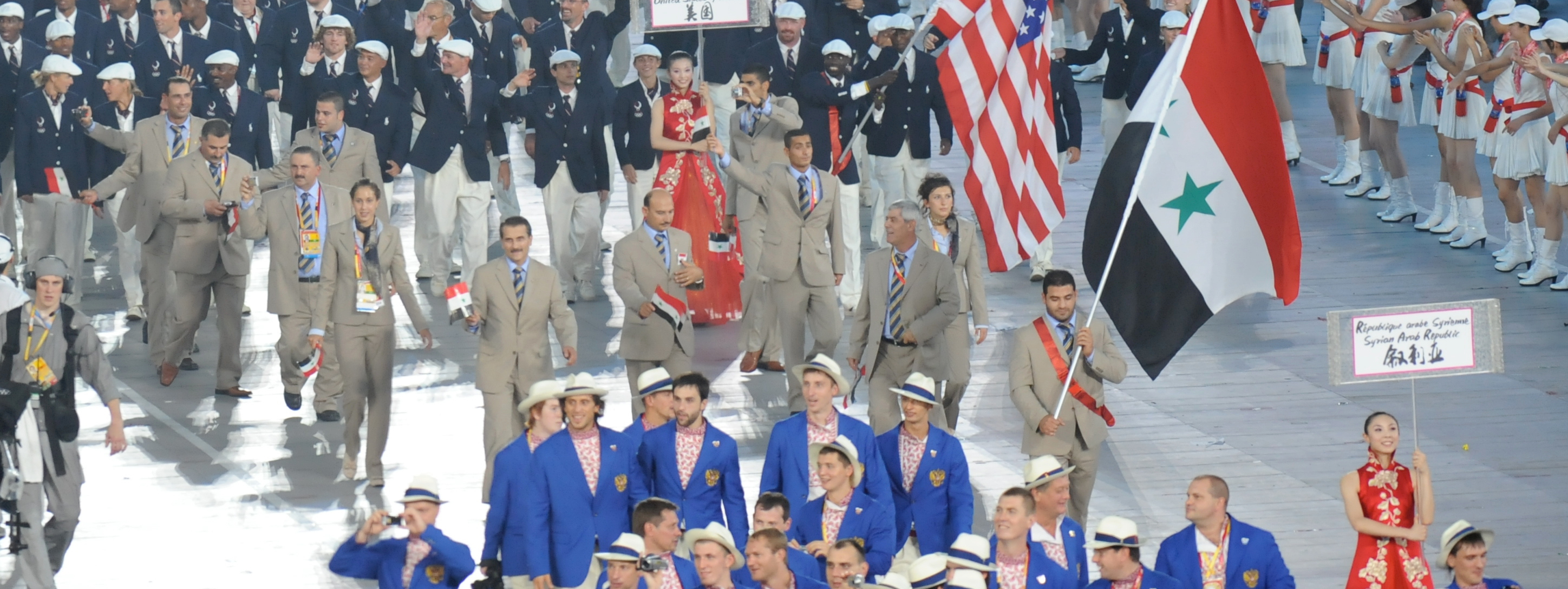
Syria at the 2008 Summer Olympics Parade of Nations.

== Athletics ==
Key

- Note–Ranks given for track events are within the athlete's heat only
- Q = Qualified for the next round
- q = Qualified for the next round as a fastest loser or, in field events, by position without achieving the qualifying target
- NR = National record
- N/A = Round not applicable for the event
- Bye = Athlete not required to compete in round

Men

| Athlete | Event | Qualification | | Final | |
| Athlete | Event | Distance | Position | Distance | Position |
|---|---|---|---|---|---|
| Majed Aldin Gazal | High jump | 2.20 NR | 24 | Did not advance | |

Women

| Athlete | Event | Heat | | Semifinal | | Final | |
| Athlete | Event | Result | Rank | Result | Rank | Result | Rank |
|---|---|---|---|---|---|---|---|
| Fadwa Al-Bouza | 100 m hurdles | 14.24 | 8 | Did not advance | | | |

== Shooting ==
Men

| Athlete | Event | Qualification | | Final | |
| Athlete | Event | Points | Rank | Points | Rank |
|---|---|---|---|---|---|
| Roger Dahi | Skeet | 91 | 41 | Did not advance | |

== Swimming ==
Men

| Athlete | Event | Heat | | Semifinal | | Final | |
| Athlete | Event | Time | Rank | Time | Rank | Time | Rank |
|---|---|---|---|---|---|---|---|
| Souhaib Kalala | 100 m backstroke | 1:00.24 | 44 | Did not advance | | | |
| Saleh Mohammad | 10 km open water | —N/a | | | | 1:54:37.7 | 19 |

Women

| Athlete | Event | Heat | | Semifinal | | Final | |
| Athlete | Event | Time | Rank | Time | Rank | Time | Rank |
|---|---|---|---|---|---|---|---|
| Bayan Jumaa | 50 m freestyle | DNS | | Did not advance | | | |

== Triathlon ==
| Athlete | Event | Swim (1.5 km) | Trans 1 | Bike (40 km) | Trans 2 | Run (10 km) | Total Time | Rank |
|---|---|---|---|---|---|---|---|---|
| Omar Tayara | Men's | 18:23 | 0:29 | 58:56 | 0:33 | 38:19 | 1:56:40.54 | 49 |

== Weightlifting ==
| Athlete | Event | Snatch | | Clean & Jerk | | Total | Rank |
| Athlete | Event | Result | Rank | Result | Rank | Total | Rank |
|---|---|---|---|---|---|---|---|
| Ahed Joughili | Men's −105 kg | 170 | 14 | 216 | 11 | 386 | 12 |

== See also ==
- Syria at the 2008 Summer Paralympics
