= Syria at the 2024 Summer Paralympics =

- IPC code: SYR
- NPC: Syrian Paralympic Committee

in Paris, France August 28, 2024 – September 8, 2024
- Competitors: 1 in 1 sport
- Flag bearer: Alaa Abdulsalam
- Medals: Gold 0 Silver 0 Bronze 0 Total 0

Summer Paralympics appearances (overview)
- 1992; 1996; 2000; 2004; 2008; 2012; 2016; 2020; 2024

The Syrian Arab Republic competed at the 2024 Summer Paralympics in Paris, France, from 28 August to 8 September 2024. This was the nation's ninth time competing at the Summer Paralympic Games after it made its debut at the 1992 Summer Paralympics. The delegation consisted of only one Athlete from one sport.

== Competitors ==
The following is the list of number of competitors in the Games.

Sport	Men	Women	Total
Athletics	1	0	1
Total	1	0	1

== Athletics ==
Athlete	Event	Final	
Athlete	Event	Result	Rank
Alaa Abdulsalam	Men's shot put F53	8.18 PB	5

== See also ==
- Syria at the 2024 Summer Olympics
- Syria at the Paralympics
