= Syria at the 2012 Summer Olympics =

- IOC code: SYR
- NOC: Syrian Olympic Committee
- Website: www.syriaolymp.org (in Arabic and English)

in London
- Competitors: 10 in 7 sports
- Flag bearer (opening): Majed Aldin Ghazal
- Flag bearer (closing): Majed Aldin Ghazal
- Medals: Gold 0 Silver 0 Bronze 0 Total 0

Summer Olympics appearances (overview)
- 1948; 1952–1964; 1968; 1972; 1976; 1980; 1984; 1988; 1992; 1996; 2000; 2004; 2008; 2012; 2016; 2020; 2024

Other related appearances
- United Arab Republic (1960)

Syria competed at the 2012 Summer Olympics in London, from 27 July to 12 August 2012. This was the nation's twelfth appearance at the Olympics since its debut in 1948. The Syrian Olympic Committee sent the nation's largest delegation to the Games, after the 1988 Summer Olympics in Seoul. A total of ten athletes, six men and four women, competed in 6 sports. Four of them received their spots in track and field, and in swimming by wild card entries. Three Syrian athletes had competed in Beijing, including high jumper Majed Aldin Ghazal, who was the nation's flag bearer at the opening ceremony. Among the sports played by the athletes, Syria marked its Olympic debut in equestrian show jumping.

Because of an ongoing 2011–12 uprising in Syria (then turned into a civil war), there were concerns about Syria's participation to the Olympic games. General Mowaffak Joumaa, president of Syrian National Olympic Committee, told ITV News: "There is no question about it—we are taking part". In April 2012, Abdelbasset Saroot, the former Syrian football goalkeeper, said in an interview with ITV News that his nation's athletes did not want to compete in these games because "they don't want to play for a flag that they have no pride or faith in". According to the British prime minister David Cameron, Syrian athletes must take part in the Olympics, but any of the nation's officials covered by a European Union travel ban were not welcome. This was the case for the Syrian Olympic Committee's head General Mowaffak Joumaa, who was denied a visa to travel to the games in an official capacity by the British government. The Syrian team in London refused to comment on the political situation in their homeland; their supporters, however, carried Ba'athist flags and voiced their support for the Syrian government.

Syria did not win any medals at the 2012 Olympics. Their last Olympic medal came in the 2004 Summer Olympics in Athens, where Naser Al Shami won the bronze for heavyweight boxing.

== Athletics ==
Men

Athlete	Event	Qualification		Final	
Athlete	Event	Distance	Position	Distance	Position
Majed Aldin Ghazal	High jump	2.16	28	Did not advance	

Women

Athlete	Event	Heat		Semifinal		Final	
Athlete	Event	Result	Rank	Result	Rank	Result	Rank
Ghofrane Mohammad	400 m hurdles	~~58.09~~	DSQ*	Did not advance			

* Almouhamad was disqualified on 7 August after failing a drug test for the banned substance methylhexanamine.

== Boxing ==
Syria earned 1 quota in boxing.

Men

Athlete	Event	Round of 32	Round of 16	Quarterfinals	Semifinals	Final	
Athlete	Event	Opposition Result	Opposition Result	Opposition Result	Opposition Result	Opposition Result	Rank
Wessam Salamana	Bantamweight	Abutalipov (KAZ); L 7–15	Did not advance				

== Cycling ==
=== Road ===
Athlete	Event	Time	Rank
Omar Hasanin	Men's road race	Did not finish	

== Equestrian ==
Syria made its Olympic debut in equestrian events.

=== Jumping ===
Athlete	Horse	Event	Qualification								Final					Total	
Athlete	Horse	Event	Round 1		Round 2			Round 3			Round A		Round B			Total	
Athlete	Horse	Event	Penalties	Rank	Penalties	Total	Rank	Penalties	Total	Rank	Penalties	Rank	Penalties	Total	Rank	Penalties	Rank
Ahmad Saber Hamcho	Wonderboy	Individual	1	=33 Q	29	30	62	Did not advance								30	62

== Shooting ==
Women

Athlete	Event	Qualification		Final	
Athlete	Event	Points	Rank	Points	Rank
Raya Zin Aldden	10 m air rifle	388	50	Did not advance	

== Swimming ==
Syria received two "Universality places" from the FINA.

Men

Athlete	Event	Heat		Semifinal		Final	
Athlete	Event	Time	Rank	Time	Rank	Time	Rank
Azad Al-Barazi	100 m breaststroke	1:03.48	39	Did not advance			

Women

Athlete	Event	Heat		Semifinal		Final	
Athlete	Event	Time	Rank	Time	Rank	Time	Rank
Bayan Jumah	100 m freestyle	59.78	40	Did not advance			

== Weightlifting ==
Syria qualified the following quota places.

Athlete	Event	Snatch		Clean & Jerk		Total	Rank
Athlete	Event	Result	Rank	Result	Rank	Total	Rank
Ahed Joughili	Men's −105 kg	180	8	218	5	398	4
Thuraia Sobh	Women's −75 kg	86	11	115	11	201	8
