= Syria at the 2009 World Championships in Athletics =

- WA code: SYR
- National federation: Syrian Arab Athletic Federation

in Berlin
- Competitors: 2 (1 man and 1 woman)
- Medals: Gold 0 Silver 0 Bronze 0 Total 0

World Championships in Athletics appearances
- 1983; 1987; 1991; 1993; 1995; 1997; 1999; 2001; 2003; 2005; 2007; 2009; 2011; 2013; 2015; 2017; 2019; 2022; 2023; 2025

Syria competed at the 2009 World Championships in Athletics from 15 to 23 August. A team of 2 athletes was announced in preparation for the competition.

== Team selection ==
Track and road events

Event	Athletes	
Event	Men	Women
200 metres		Mounira Al-Saleh

Field and combined events

Event	Athletes	
Event	Men	Women
High jump	Majed Aldin Ghazal	

== Results ==
=== Men ===
Field and combined events

Event	Athletes	Qualification		Final	
Event	Athletes	Result	Rank	Result	Rank
High jump	Majed Aldin Ghazal	2.15 SB	28	did not advance	

=== Women ===
Track and road events

Event	Athletes	Heats		Semifinal		Final	
Event	Athletes	Result	Rank	Result	Rank	Result	Rank
200 m	Mounira Al-Saleh	DNF		did not advance			
