= Syria at the 1984 Summer Olympics =

- IOC code: SYR
- NOC: Syrian Olympic Committee
- Website: www.syriaolymp.org (in Arabic and English)

in Los Angeles
- Competitors: 9 in 5 sports
- Flag bearer: Joseph Atiyeh
- Medals Ranked 33rd: Gold 0 Silver 1 Bronze 0 Total 1

Summer Olympics appearances (overview)
- 1948; 1952–1964; 1968; 1972; 1976; 1980; 1984; 1988; 1992; 1996; 2000; 2004; 2008; 2012; 2016; 2020; 2024

Other related appearances
- United Arab Republic (1960)

Syria competed at the 1984 Summer Olympics in Los Angeles, United States. Joseph Atiyeh won the nation's first ever Olympic medal.

== Medalists ==
Medal	Name	Sport	Event	Date
Silver	Joseph Atiyeh	Wrestling	Men's freestyle 100 kg	11 August

== Competitors ==
The following is the list of number of competitors in the Games.

Sport	Men	Women	Total
Boxing	2	0	2
Diving	1	0	1
Shooting	1	0	1
Weightlifting	2	0	2
Wrestling	3	0	3
Total	9	0	9

== Boxing ==
Men

Athlete	Event	First round	Second round	Third round	Quarterfinals	Semifinals	Final	
Athlete	Event	Opposition Result	Opposition Result	Opposition Result	Opposition Result	Opposition Result	Opposition Result	Rank
Mohamed Ali El-Dahan	Welterweight	BYE	Künzler (FRG); L 0-5	Did not advance				
Naasan Ajjoub	Heavyweight	Singh (IND); L 0-5	Did not advance					

== Diving ==
Diver	Event	Qualification		Final	
Diver	Event	Result	Rank	Result	Rank
Alaeddin Soueidan	10m platform	317,88	25	did not advance	

== Shooting ==
Open

Diver	Event	Final	
Diver	Event	Result	Rank
Mohamed Ragheb	Skeet	185	38

== Weightlifting ==
Men

Athlete	Event	Snatch		Clean & Jerk		Total	Rank
Athlete	Event	Result	Rank	Result	Rank	Total	Rank
Salem Ajjoub	−90 kg	135,0	23	180,0	20	315,0	20
Abuaihuda Ozon	−110 kg	145,0	9	170,0	11	315,0	10

== Wrestling ==
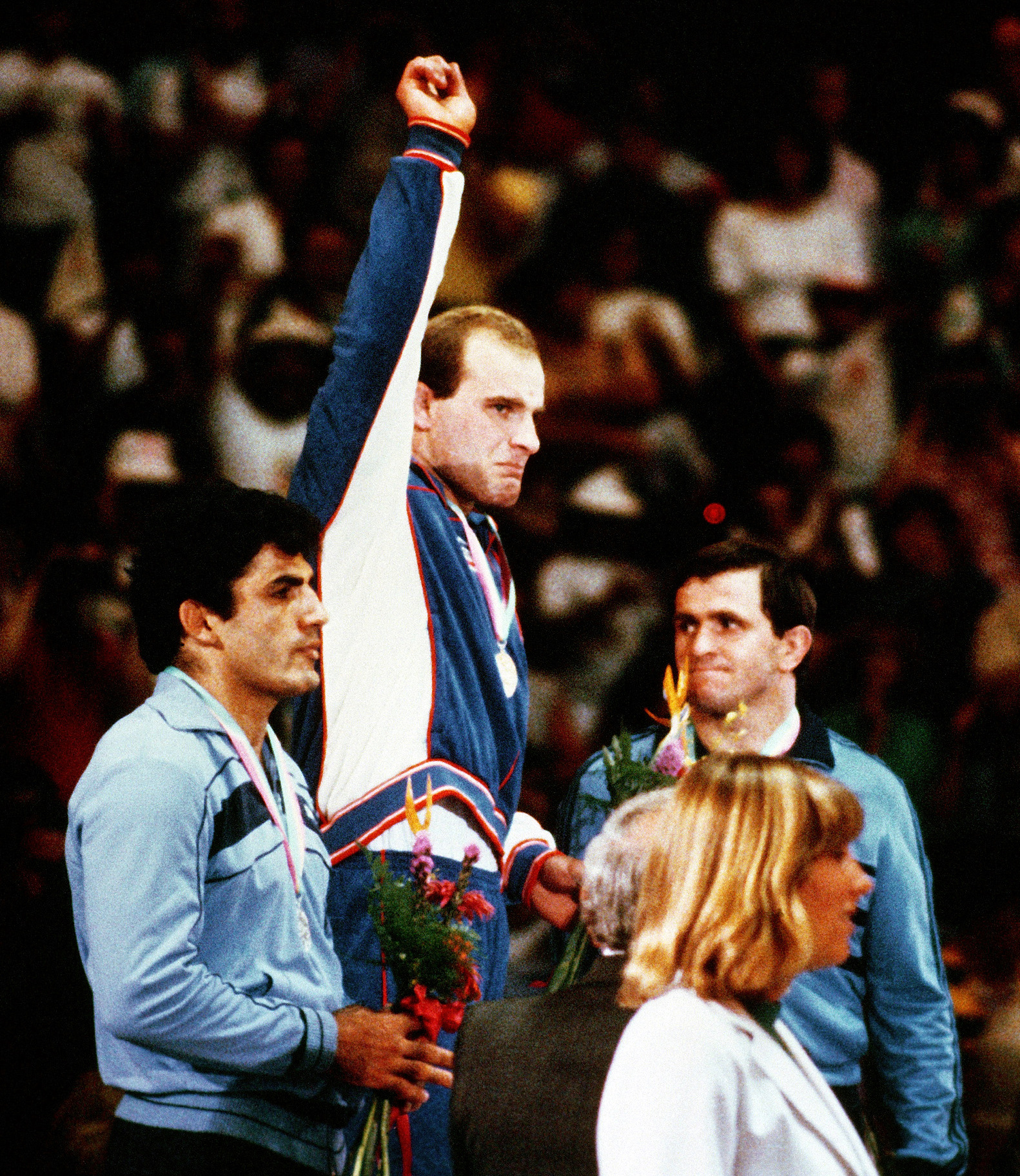
Freestyle wrestling 100 kg medal ceremony, Syrian silver medalist Joseph Atiyeh first from left.

Men's freestyle

Athlete	Event	Round 1	Round 2	Round 3	Round 4	Round 5	Round 6	Final / BM	
Athlete	Event	Opposition Result	Opposition Result	Opposition Result	Opposition Result	Opposition Result	Opposition Result	Opposition Result	Rank
Mohamed Zayar	−74 kg	Houkreo Bambe (CMR); L T 3:14	Rajinder Singh (IND); L 3-4	Did not advance					19
Joseph Atiyeh	−100 kg	Vasile Puşcaşu (ROU); W T 4:42	Kartar Dhillon Singh (IND); W T 0:33	Georgios Poikilidis (GRE); W F 0:27	—			Lou Banach (USA); L T 1:01	Silver medal

Men's Greco-Roman

Athlete	Event	Round 1	Round 2	Round 3	Round 4	Round 5	Round 6	Final / BM	
Athlete	Event	Opposition Result	Opposition Result	Opposition Result	Opposition Result	Opposition Result	Opposition Result	Opposition Result	Rank
Mohamed Al-Nakdali	−68 kg	Boris Goldstein (ARG); W 12-0	Shaban Ibrahim (EGY); W T 0:48	Tapio Sipilä (FIN); L 0-12	James Martinez (USA); L 7-9	—		Dietmar Streitler (AUT); L 4-8	6
