= Zarev =

Zarev (Bulgarian: Зарев) is a surname. Notable people with the surname include:

- Ivan Zarev (born 1986), Bulgarian volleyball player
- Metodi Zarev
- Roumen Zarev (born 1953),

Bulgarian

- Vladimir Zarev (born 1947), Bulgarian novelist
