= Syria at the 2012 Summer Paralympics =

- IPC code: SYR
- NPC: Syrian Paralympic Committee

in London
- Competitors: 5 in 2 sports
- Medals: Gold 0 Silver 0 Bronze 0 Total 0

Summer Paralympics appearances (overview)
- 1992; 1996; 2000; 2004; 2008; 2012; 2016; 2020; 2024

Syria competed at the 2012 Summer Paralympics in London, United Kingdom from August 29 to September 9, 2012.

== Athletics ==
Men’s Field Events

Athlete	Event	Distance	Points	Rank
Bassam Bassam Sawsan	Discus Throw F42	37.27	—N/a	8
Bassam Bassam Sawsan	Javelin Throw F42	43.10	—N/a	9
Mohamad Mohamad	Shot Put F57-58	13.12	922	6
Mohamad Mohamad	Javelin Throw F57-58	40.54	920	7

== Powerlifting ==
Men

Athlete	Event	Result	Rank
Shadi Issa	-60kg	170	7

Women

Athlete	Event	Result	Rank
Noura Baddour	-40kg	NMR	
Alshikh Rasha	-75kg	110	5

== See also ==
- Syria at the 2012 Summer Olympics
