= Syria at the 2004 Summer Olympics =

- IOC code: SYR
- NOC: Syrian Olympic Committee
- Website: www.syriaolymp.org (in Arabic and English)

in Athens
- Competitors: 6 in 5 sports
- Flag bearer: Mohammad Hazzory
- Medals Ranked 71st: Gold 0 Silver 0 Bronze 1 Total 1

Summer Olympics appearances (overview)
- 1948; 1952–1964; 1968; 1972; 1976; 1980; 1984; 1988; 1992; 1996; 2000; 2004; 2008; 2012; 2016; 2020; 2024

Other related appearances
- United Arab Republic (1960)

Syria competed at the 2004 Summer Olympics in Athens, Greece, from 13 to 29 August 2004.

== Medalists ==
| Medal | Name | Sport | Event | Date |
|---|---|---|---|---|
| Bronze | Naser Al Shami | Boxing | Heavyweight | August 28 |

== Athletics ==
Syrian athletes have so far achieved qualifying standards in the following athletics events (up to a maximum of 3 athletes in each event at the 'A' Standard, and 1 at the 'B' Standard).

Key

- Note–Ranks given for track events are within the athlete's heat only
- Q = Qualified for the next round
- q = Qualified for the next round as a fastest loser or, in field events, by position without achieving the qualifying target
- NR = National record
- N/A = Round not applicable for the event
- Bye = Athlete not required to compete in round

Men
Field events

| Athlete | Event | Qualification | | Final | |
| Athlete | Event | Distance | Position | Distance | Position |
|---|---|---|---|---|---|
| Mohammad Hazzory | Triple jump | 16.37 | 25 | Did not advance | |

Women
Track & road events

| Athlete | Event | Heat | | Final | |
| Athlete | Event | Result | Rank | Result | Rank |
|---|---|---|---|---|---|
| Zainab Bakkour | 5000 m | 17:18.66 | 18 | Did not advance | |

== Boxing ==
Syria sent a single boxer to Athens.

| Athlete | Event | Round of 16 | Quarterfinals | Semifinals | Final | |
| Athlete | Event | Opposition Result | Opposition Result | Opposition Result | Opposition Result | Rank |
|---|---|---|---|---|---|---|
| Naser Al Shami | Heavyweight | Izonritei (NGR); W 30–17 | Alakbarov (AZE); W DSQ | Solís (CUB); L RSC | Did not advance | Bronze medal |

== Judo ==
Syria has qualified a single judoka.

| Athlete | Event | Round of 32 | Round of 16 | Quarterfinals | Semifinals | Repechage 1 | Repechage 2 | Repechage 3 | Final / BM | |
| Athlete | Event | Opposition Result | Opposition Result | Opposition Result | Opposition Result | Opposition Result | Opposition Result | Opposition Result | Opposition Result | Rank |
|---|---|---|---|---|---|---|---|---|---|---|
| Yhya Hasaba | Men's −100 kg | Ferguson (USA); L 0001–1110 | Did not advance | | | | | | | |

== Shooting ==
Syria has qualified a single shooter.

Men

| Athlete | Event | Qualification | | Final | |
| Athlete | Event | Points | Rank | Points | Rank |
|---|---|---|---|---|---|
| Roger Dahi | Skeet | 106 | 41 | Did not advance | |

== Swimming ==
Syrian swimmers earned qualifying standards in the following events (up to a maximum of 2 swimmers in each event at the A-standard time, and 1 at the B-standard time):

Men

| Athlete | Event | Heat | | Semifinal | | Final | |
| Athlete | Event | Time | Rank | Time | Rank | Time | Rank |
|---|---|---|---|---|---|---|---|
| Rafed El-Masri | 50 m freestyle | 22.58 | =18 | Did not advance | | | |

== See also ==
- Syria at the 2004 Summer Paralympics
- Syria at the 2005 Mediterranean Games
