= Syria at the 1972 Summer Olympics =

- IOC code: SYR
- NOC: Syrian Olympic Committee
- Website: www.syriaolymp.org (in Arabic and English)

in Munich
- Competitors: 5 (4 men, 1 woman) in 3 sports
- Flag bearer: Mounzer Khatib
- Medals: Gold 0 Silver 0 Bronze 0 Total 0

Summer Olympics appearances (overview)
- 1948; 1952–1964; 1968; 1972; 1976; 1980; 1984; 1988; 1992; 1996; 2000; 2004; 2008; 2012; 2016; 2020; 2024

Other related appearances
- United Arab Republic (1960)

Syria competed at the 1972 Summer Olympics in Munich, West Germany. Five competitors, four men and one woman, took part in four events in three sports. It was the first appearance since the 1970 coup and beginning of Assad family rule.

== Competitors ==
The following is the list of number of competitors in the Games.

| Sport | Men | Women | Total |
|---|---|---|---|
| Athletics | 0 | 1 | 1 |
| Shooting | 2 | 0 | 2 |
| Wrestling | 2 | 0 | 2 |
| Total | 4 | 1 | 5 |

== Athletics ==
Syria sent one female athlete to compete at the olympics. Malak El-Nasser failed to qualify from the first round to semi-finals and finished last in her heat in Women's 800 metres.

Key

- Note–Ranks given for track events are within the athlete's heat only
- Q = Qualified for the next round
- q = Qualified for the next round as a fastest loser or, in field events, by position without achieving the qualifying target
- NR = National record
- N/A = Round not applicable for the event
- Bye = Athlete not required to compete in round

Women
Track events

| Athlete | Event | Qualification | | Semifinal | | Final | |
| Athlete | Event | Result | Position | Result | Position | Result | Position |
|---|---|---|---|---|---|---|---|
| Malak El-Nasser | 800 m | DNF | 8 | Did not advance | | | |

== Shooting ==
Two male shooters represented Syria in 1972.

Open

| Diver | Event | Final | |
| Diver | Event | Result | Rank |
|---|---|---|---|
| Mounzer Khatib | Trap | 170 | 47 |
| Joseph Mesmar | Trap | 167 | 50 |

== Wrestling ==
Syria nominated two male wrestlers.

Key:

- VT – Victory by Fall.
- Pt – Decision by Points.
- Os – Obvious Superiority.

Men's Greco-Roman

| Athlete | Event | Round 1 Result | Round 2 Result | Round 3 Result | Round 4 Result | Round 5 Result | Round 6 Result | Rank |
|---|---|---|---|---|---|---|---|---|
| Mohieddin El-Sas | −48 kg | Alfredo Olvera (MEX); W ^{VT} | Withdrew | | | | | 15 |
| Fawzi Salloum | −57 kg | Ali Lachkar (MAR); Draw | Withdrew | | | | | 14 |
