= Syria at the 2000 Summer Paralympics =

- IPC code: SYR
- NPC: Syrian Paralympic Committee

in Sydney
- Competitors: 4
- Medals Ranked 69th: Gold 0 Silver 0 Bronze 0 Total 0

Summer Paralympics appearances (overview)
- 1992; 1996; 2000; 2004; 2008; 2012; 2016; 2020; 2024

Syria competed at the 2000 Summer Paralympics in Sydney, Australia. 4 competitors from Syria won no medals to finish joint 69th in the medal table along with all other countries who failed to win medals.

== See also ==
- Syria at the Paralympics
- Syria at the 2000 Summer Olympics
