= Syria at the 2017 World Championships in Athletics =

- WA code: SYR
- National federation: Syrian Arab Athletic Federation

in London
- Competitors: 1 (1 man)
- Medals Ranked =37th: Gold 0 Silver 0 Bronze 1 Total 1

World Championships in Athletics appearances
- 1983; 1987; 1991; 1993; 1995; 1997; 1999; 2001; 2003; 2005; 2007; 2009; 2011; 2013; 2015; 2017; 2019; 2022; 2023; 2025

Syria competed at the 2017 World Championships in Athletics in London, United Kingdom, from 4 to 13 August 2017. Majd Eddin Ghazal won a bronze medal in the high jump discipline.

== Medalists ==
The following Syrian competitors won medals at the Championships.

Medal	Athlete	Event	Date
Bronze	Majd Eddin Ghazal	Men's high jump	13 August

== Results ==
(q – qualified, NM – no mark, SB – season best)

=== Men ===
Field events

Athlete	Event	Qualification		Final	
Athlete	Event	Distance	Position	Distance	Position
Majd Eddin Ghazal	High jump	2.29	7 q	2.29	3rd place, bronze medalist(s)
