= Syria at the 2016 Summer Olympics =

- IOC code: SYR
- NOC: Syrian Olympic Committee
- Website: www.syriaolymp.org (in Arabic and English)

in Rio de Janeiro
- Competitors: 7 in 5 sports
- Flag bearer: Majed Aldin Ghazal
- Medals: Gold 0 Silver 0 Bronze 0 Total 0

Summer Olympics appearances (overview)
- 1948; 1952–1964; 1968; 1972; 1976; 1980; 1984; 1988; 1992; 1996; 2000; 2004; 2008; 2012; 2016; 2020; 2024

Other related appearances
- United Arab Republic (1960)

Syria competed at the 2016 Summer Olympics in Rio de Janeiro, Brazil, from 5 to 21 August 2016. It was the nation's thirteenth appearance at the Summer Olympics since its debut in 1948.

Syrian Olympic Committee sent a team of seven athletes, four men and three women, to compete in five different sports at the Games, matching the nation's roster size with Beijing 2008 and Atlanta 1996. This was also the youngest delegation in Syria's Olympic history, with about half the team under the age of 25, and many of them were expected to reach their peak in time for the 2020 Summer Olympics in Tokyo. Among the sports represented by the athletes, Syria made its Olympic debut in table tennis, as well as its return to judo after a twelve-year absence.

The Syrian delegation featured four returning Olympians from the previous Games; among them were hurdler Ghfran Almouhamad and swimmers Bayan Jumah (women's 50 m freestyle) and American-based breaststroker Azad Al-Barazi. Attending his third Olympics as the oldest and most experienced competitor (aged 29), high jumper Majed Aldin Ghazal reprised his role of leading the Syrian team as the nation's flag bearer for the second consecutive time in the opening ceremony.

Syria, however, did not win any Olympic medals in Rio de Janeiro. The nation's last medal happened at the 2004 Summer Olympics in Athens, where heavyweight boxer Naser Al-Shami bagged the silver. Unable to end the podium drought in twelve years, Ghazal improved upon his twenty-eighth position from London 2012 to produce a more substantial finish for the Syrians, sharing a seventh-place tie with Cyprus' Kyriakos Ioannou and the Bahamas' Donald Thomas in the men's high jump final.

As well as the country's official representatives, a number of Syrians participated in the Refugee Olympic Team at the 2016 Summer Olympics and Independent Paralympic Athletes at the 2016 Summer Paralympics, including swimmer Yusra Mardini and Paralympic swimmer Ibrahim Al Hussein, who carried the Olympic flame through the Eleonas refugee camp. (Mardini and her sister Sara inspired the Netflix film The Swimmers.)

== Athletics ==
Syrian athletes have so far achieved qualifying standards in the following athletics events (up to a maximum of 3 athletes in each event):

Key

- Note–Ranks given for track events are within the athlete's heat only
- Q = Qualified for the next round
- q = Qualified for the next round as a fastest loser or, in field events, by position without achieving the qualifying target
- NR = National record
- N/A = Round not applicable for the event
- Bye = Athlete not required to compete in round

Track & road events

Athlete	Event	Heat		Semifinal		Final	
Athlete	Event	Result	Rank	Result	Rank	Result	Rank
Ghofrane Mohammad	Women's 400 m hurdles	58.85	8	Did not advance			

Field events

Athlete	Event	Qualification		Final	
Athlete	Event	Distance	Position	Distance	Position
Majed Aldin Ghazal	Men's high jump	2.29	7 q	2.29	=7

== Judo ==
Syria has received an invitation from the Tripartite Commission to send a judoka competing in the men's lightweight category (73 kg) to the Olympics, signifying the nation's Olympic return to the sport for the first time since 2004.

Athlete	Event	Round of 64	Round of 32	Round of 16	Quarterfinals	Semifinals	Repechage	Final / BM	
Athlete	Event	Opposition Result	Opposition Result	Opposition Result	Opposition Result	Opposition Result	Opposition Result	Opposition Result	Rank
Mohamad Kasem	Men's −73 kg	Bye	An C-r (KOR); L 000–110	Did not advance					

== Swimming ==
Syria has received a Universality invitation from FINA to send two swimmers (one male and one female) to the Olympics.

Athlete	Event	Heat		Semifinal		Final	
Athlete	Event	Time	Rank	Time	Rank	Time	Rank
Azad Al-Barazi	Men's 100 m breaststroke	1:02.22	36	Did not advance			
Bayan Jumah	Women's 50 m freestyle	26.41	=49	Did not advance			

== Table tennis ==
Syria has received an invitation from the Tripartite Commission to send Heba Alllejji in the women's singles for the first time to the Olympic table tennis tournament.

Athlete	Event	Preliminary	Round 1	Round 2	Round 3	Round of 16	Quarterfinals	Semifinals	Final / BM	
Athlete	Event	Opposition Result	Opposition Result	Opposition Result	Opposition Result	Opposition Result	Opposition Result	Opposition Result	Opposition Result	Rank
Heba Allejji	Women's singles	Silva (MEX); L 0–4	Did not advance							

== Weightlifting ==
Syria has qualified one male weightlifter for the Rio Olympics by virtue of a top seven national finish at the 2016 Asian Championships. The team must allocate this place by June 20, 2016.

Athlete	Event	Snatch		Clean & Jerk		Total	Rank
Athlete	Event	Result	Rank	Result	Rank	Total	Rank
Man Asaad	Men's +105 kg	180	=17	220	=14	400	15
