= Syria at the 1996 Summer Paralympics =

- IPC code: SYR
- NPC: Syrian Paralympic Committee

in Atlanta
- Competitors: 2
- Medals: Gold 0 Silver 0 Bronze 0 Total 0

Summer Paralympics appearances (overview)
- 1992; 1996; 2000; 2004; 2008; 2012; 2016; 2020; 2024

Two male athletes from Syria competed at the 1996 Summer Paralympics in Atlanta, United States.

== See also ==
- Syria at the Paralympics
- Syria at the 1996 Summer Olympics
