= Track and field at the 2015 Military World Games – Men's high jump =

The men's high jump event at the 2015 Military World Games was held on 5 October at the KAFAC Sports Complex.

== Records ==
Prior to this competition, the existing world and CISM record were as follows:

| World Record | Javier Sotomayor (CUB) | 2.45 | Salamanca, Spain | 27 July 1993 |
| CISM World Record | Mutaz Essa Barshim (QAT) | 2.29 | Rio de Janeiro, Brazil | 20 July 2011 |

== Schedule ==
| Date | Time | Round |
|---|---|---|
| 5 October 2015 | 16:00 | Final |

== Medalists ==
| Gold | Silver | Bronze |
|---|---|---|
| Majd Eddin Ghazal; Syria | Daniil Tsyplakov; Russia | Mohammadreza Vazifedoost; Iran |

== Results ==
=== Final ===
| Rank | Athlete | Nationality | 1.90 | 1.95 | 2.00 | 2.05 | 2.10 | 2.15 | 2.20 | 2.24 | 2.28 | 2.31 | 2.34 | Mark | Notes |
|---|---|---|---|---|---|---|---|---|---|---|---|---|---|---|---|
| 1st place, gold medalist(s) | Majd Eddin Ghazal | Syria | - | - | - | - | o | o | x- | o | o | xo | | 2.31 | CR |
| 2nd place, silver medalist(s) | Daniil Tsyplakov | Russia | - | - | - | - | o | o | o | o | o | xx- | x | 2.28 | |
| 3rd place, bronze medalist(s) | Mohammadreza Vazifedoost | Iran | - | - | - | - | o | o | xxo | o | xxx | | | 2.24 | |
| 4 | Ji Chen | China | - | - | - | o | o | o | o | xo | xxx | | | 2.24 | |
| 5 | Keivan Ghanbarzadeh | Iran | - | - | - | - | o | o | xo | xo | xxx | | | 2.24 | |
| 6 | Manjula Kumara Wijesekara | Sri Lanka | - | - | - | - | o | o | o | x- | xx | | | 2.20 | |
| 6 | Hamdi Alamine | Qatar | - | - | o | o | o | o | o | xxx | | | | 2.20 | |
| 6 | Mathew Kiplagat Sawe | Kenya | - | - | o | - | o | o | o | xxx | | | | 2.20 | |
| 9 | Muamer Aissa Barsham | Qatar | - | - | - | o | o | o | xxo | xxx | | | | 2.20 | |
| 10 | Yuriy Krymarenko | Ukraine | - | - | - | o | o | o | x- | xx | | | | 2.15 | |
| 11 | Martijn Nuijens | Netherlands | o | o | o | o | xxx | | | | | | | 2.05 | |
| 12 | Lee Sung | South Korea | - | - | xo | o | xxx | | | | | | | 2.05 | |
| | Daniel Camara da Silva | Uruguay | xxx | | | | | | | | | | | NM | |
| | Ashqar Isaac | Palestine | xxx | | | | | | | | | | | NM | |
| | Emmanuel Chimdzeka | Malawi | | | | | | | | | | | | DNS | |
| | Pethias Barclays Gondwe Mdoka | Malawi | | | | | | | | | | | | DNS | |
