= Malak El-Nasser =

Syrian athlete

Personal information
- Native name: ملك الناصر
- National team: Syria
- Born: January 19, 1954 (age 72)

Sport
- Country: Syria
- Sport: Athletics
- Updated on 17 July 2017

Malak El-Nasser (Arabic: ملك الناصر; born January 19, 1954) is a Syrian Olympic athlete. She represented Syria in 1972 Summer Olympics in Munich. She is the first Syrian woman ever to participate in the Olympics.

== Olympic participation ==
=== München 1972 ===
El-Nasser the youngest and the only female participant for Syria in that tournament aged 18 years and 225 days then.

Athletics – Women's 800 metres – Round One El-Nasser failed to qualify the first round to semi-finals and finished last in her heat in round one.

Heat 3
Rank	Name	Nationality	Lane	Time
1	Nijolė Sabaitė	Soviet Union	4	2:01.50
2	Abby Hoffman	Canada	5	2:01.57
3	Maria Sykora	Austria	7	2:01.82
4	Gisela Ellenberger	West Germany	1	2:01.92
5	Maritta Politz	East Germany	3	2:02.40
6	Margaret Coomber	Great Britain	2	2:02.99
7	Emesia Chizunga	Malawi	6	2:19.22
-	Malak El-Nasser	Syria	8	DNF
