= Syria at the 2008 Summer Paralympics =

- IPC code: SYR
- NPC: Syrian Paralympic Committee

in Beijing
- Competitors: 5 in 2 sports
- Flag bearer: Rasha Alshikh
- Medals Ranked 69th: Gold 0 Silver 0 Bronze 1 Total 1

Summer Paralympics appearances (overview)
- 1992; 1996; 2000; 2004; 2008; 2012; 2016; 2020; 2024

Syria sent a delegation to compete at the 2008 Summer Paralympics in Beijing, China.

== Medallists ==
Medal	Name	Sport	Event
Bronze	Rasha Alshikh	Powerlifting	Women's -67.5kg

== Sports ==
=== Athletics ===
==== Men's field ====
Athlete	Class	Event	Final		
Athlete	Class	Event	Result	Points	Rank
Mohamad Mohamad	F57-58	Javelin throw	37.66	970	6

=== Powerlifting ===
==== Men ====
Athlete	Event	Result	Rank
Yahya Abou Mughdeb	52kg	137.5	7
Ammar Shekh Ahmad	82.5kg	192.5	6

==== Women ====
Athlete	Event	Result	Rank
Rasha Alshikh	67.5kg	117.5	3rd place, bronze medalist(s)
Natali Elias	52kg	87.5	6

== See also ==
- Syria at the Paralympics
- Syria at the 2008 Summer Olympics
