= Syria at the 1948 Summer Olympics =

- IOC code: SYR
- NOC: Syrian Olympic Committee
- Website: www.syriaolymp.org (in Arabic and English)

in London
- Competitors: 1 (1 man) in 1 sport
- Flag bearer: Zouheir Shourbagi
- Medals: Gold 0 Silver 0 Bronze 0 Total 0

Summer Olympics appearances (overview)
- 1948; 1952–1964; 1968; 1972; 1976; 1980; 1984; 1988; 1992; 1996; 2000; 2004; 2008; 2012; 2016; 2020; 2024

Other related appearances
- United Arab Republic (1960)

Syria competed in the Summer Olympic Games for the first time at the 1948 Summer Olympics in London, England.

== Competitors ==
The following is the list of number of competitors in the Games.

Sport	Men	Women	Total
Diving	1	0	1
Total	1	0	1

== Diving ==
Diver	Event	Final	
Diver	Event	Result	Rank
Zouheir Shourbagi	3m springboard	Did not start	
Zouheir Shourbagi	10m platform	97.81	10
