= Syria at the 1996 Summer Olympics =

- IOC code: SYR
- NOC: Syrian Olympic Committee
- Website: www.syriaolymp.org (in Arabic and English)

in Atlanta
- Competitors: 7 (6 men and 1 women) in 5 sports
- Flag bearer: Ghada Shouaa
- Medals Ranked 49th: Gold 1 Silver 0 Bronze 0 Total 1

Summer Olympics appearances (overview)
- 1948; 1952–1964; 1968; 1972; 1976; 1980; 1984; 1988; 1992; 1996; 2000; 2004; 2008; 2012; 2016; 2020; 2024

Other related appearances
- United Arab Republic (1960)

Syria competed at the 1996 Summer Olympics in Atlanta, United States. Ghada Shouaa won the nation's first ever gold medal.

== Medalists ==
Medal	Name	Sport	Event
Gold	Ghada Shouaa	Athletics	Women's heptathlon

== Athletics ==
Women
Combined events – Heptathlon

Athlete	Event	100H	HJ	SP	200 m	LJ	JT	800 m	Final	Rank
Ghada Shouaa	Result	13.72	1.86	15.95	23.85	6.26	55.70	2:15.43	6.780	Gold medal
Ghada Shouaa	Points	1018	1054	925	995	930	971	887	6.780	Gold medal

== Boxing ==
Men

Athlete	Event	Round of 32	Round of 16	Quarterfinals	Semifinals	Final
Athlete	Event	Opposition Result	Opposition Result	Opposition Result	Opposition Result	Rank
Khaled Falah	Flyweight	Phosuvan (THA); W 11-9	Daniel Reyes (COL); L 13-15	Did not advance		
Adnan Khaddour	Light heavyweight	Bispo (BRA); L 4-9	Did not advance			

== Swimming ==
Men

Athlete	Event	Heat		Final B		Final A	
Athlete	Event	Time	Rank	Time	Rank	Time	Rank
Hicham El-Masry	400 m freestyle	4:10.23	32	Did not advance			
Hicham El-Masry	1500 m freestyle	16:42.35	32	Did not advance			

== Weightlifting ==
Men

Athlete	Event	Snatch		Clean & Jerk		Total	Rank
Athlete	Event	Result	Rank	Result	Rank	Total	Rank
Abdalla Al-Sebaei	−70 kg	130.0	22	160.0	22	290.0	22

== Wrestling ==
Men's freestyle

Athlete	Event	Round 1	Round 2	Round 3	Round 4	Round 5	Round 6	Final / BM	
Athlete	Event	Opposition Result	Opposition Result	Opposition Result	Opposition Result	Opposition Result	Opposition Result	Opposition Result	Rank
Ahmad Al-Osta	−68 kg	Arayik Gevorgyan (ARM); L 1-9	Yüksel Şanlı (TUR); W 4-1	Arsen Fadzayev (UZB); W 11-9	Küllo Kõiv (EST); L 1–4	Did not advance		Küllo Kõiv (EST); L 2-7	8

Men's Greco-Roman

Athlete	Event	Round 1	Round 2	Round 3	Round 4	Round 5	Round 6	Final / BM	
Athlete	Event	Opposition Result	Opposition Result	Opposition Result	Opposition Result	Opposition Result	Opposition Result	Opposition Result	Rank
Khaled Al-Faraj	−52 kg	Alfred Ter-Mkrtychyan (GER); W 3-1	Lázaro Rivas (CUB); L 0-5	Ha Tae-yeon (KOR); L 0-10	Did not advance				15
