= Wrestling at the 1968 Summer Olympics – Men's Greco-Roman 78 kg =

Wrestling at the Olympics

Men's Greco-Roman 78 kg at the Games of the XIX Olympiad
- Venue: Insurgentes Ice Rink
- Dates: 23–26 October 1968
- Competitors: 22 from 22 nations

Medalists
1st place, gold medalist(s)		Rudolf Vesper	East Germany
2nd place, silver medalist(s)		Daniel Robin	France
3rd place, bronze medalist(s)		Károly Bajkó	Hungary

The Men's Greco-Roman Welterweight at the 1968 Summer Olympics as part of the wrestling program were held at the Insurgentes Ice Rink. The weight class allowed wrestlers of up to 78 kilograms to compete.

== Results ==
The following wrestlers took part in the event:

Rank	Name	Country
1	Rudolf Vesper	East Germany
2	Daniel Robin	France
3	Károly Bajkó	Hungary
4	Metodi Zarev	Bulgaria
5	Ion Ţăranu	Romania
6	Jan Kårström	Sweden
AC	Franz Berger	Austria
AC	Harald Barlie	Norway
AC	Milan Nenadić	Yugoslavia
AC	Viktor Igumenov	Soviet Union
AC	Dimitrios Savvas	Greece
AC	Adam Ostrowski	Poland
AC	Sırrı Acar	Turkey
AC	Peter Nettekoven	West Germany
AC	Mahmoud Balah	Syria
AC	Toshiro Tashiro	Japan
AC	Larry Lyden	United States
AC	Jimmy Martinetti	Switzerland
AC	Brian Heffel	Canada
AC	Daniel Alba	Mexico
AC	Wesley O'Brien	Australia
AC	Pentti Salo	Finland
