= Syria at the 2013 World Championships in Athletics =

- WA code: SYR
- National federation: Syrian Arab Athletic Federation
- Website: www.gsf-sport.com

in Moscow
- Competitors: 1
- Medals: Gold 0 Silver 0 Bronze 0 Total 0

World Championships in Athletics appearances
- 1983; 1987; 1991; 1993; 1995; 1997; 1999; 2001; 2003; 2005; 2007; 2009; 2011; 2013; 2015; 2017; 2019; 2022; 2023

Syria competed at the 2013 World Championships in Athletics from 10–18 August in Moscow, Russia. One athlete was announced to represent the country in the competition.

== Results ==
=== Men ===
Athlete	Event	Qualification		Final	
Athlete	Event	Distance	Position	Distance	Position
Majed Aldin Gazal	High jump	2.22 'SB	21	did not advance	
