= Syria at the 2000 Summer Olympics =

- IOC code: SYR
- NOC: Syrian Olympic Committee
- Website: www.syriaolymp.org (in Arabic and English)

in Sydney
- Competitors: 8 in 4 sports
- Flag bearer: Moutassem Ghotouq
- Medals: Gold 0 Silver 0 Bronze 0 Total 0

Summer Olympics appearances (overview)
- 1948; 1952–1964; 1968; 1972; 1976; 1980; 1984; 1988; 1992; 1996; 2000; 2004; 2008; 2012; 2016; 2020; 2024

Other related appearances
- United Arab Republic (1960)

Syria competed at the 2000 Summer Olympics in Sydney, Australia.

== Athletics ==
Key

- Note–Ranks given for track events are within the athlete's heat only
- Q = Qualified for the next round
- q = Qualified for the next round as a fastest loser or, in field events, by position without achieving the qualifying target
- NR = National record
- N/A = Round not applicable for the event
- Bye = Athlete not required to compete in round

Men
Field events

Athlete	Event	Qualification		Final	
Athlete	Event	Result	Position	Result	Position
Zid Abou Hamed	400 m hurdles	50.74	33	did not advance	
Zahr-Edin Al Najem	400 m hurdles	52.7	59	did not advance	

Women
Combined events – Heptathlon

Athlete	Event	100H	HJ	SP	200 m	LJ	JT	800 m	Final	Rank
Ghada Shouaa	Result	DNF	—	—	—	—	—	—	DNF	
Ghada Shouaa	Points	0	—	—	—	—	—	—	DNF	

== Boxing ==
Men

Athlete	Event	Round of 16	Quarterfinals	Semifinals	Final	
Athlete	Event	Opposition Result	Opposition Result	Opposition Result	Opposition Result	Rank
Yousif Massas	Light middleweight	Ibraimov (KAZ); L RSC	Did not advance			
Ihab Al-Youssef	Light heavyweight	Venter (RSA); L 12–9	Did not advance			

== Shooting ==
Syria has qualified a single shooter.

Men

Athlete	Event	Qualification		Final	
Athlete	Event	Points	Rank	Points	Rank
Mohamad Mahfoud	50 m rifle prone	575	53	did not advance	

== Swimming ==
Syrian swimmers earned qualifying standards in the following events (up to a maximum of 2 swimmers in each event at the A-standard time, and 1 at the B-standard time):

Men

Athlete	Event	Heat		Semifinal		Final	
Athlete	Event	Time	Rank	Time	Rank	Time	Rank
Fadi Kouzmah	200 m butterfly	02:11.56	46	did not advance			

Women

Athlete	Event	Heat		Semifinal		Final	
Athlete	Event	Time	Rank	Time	Rank	Time	Rank
Marella Mamoun	200 m freestyle	02:18.78	39	did not advance			
