= Syria at the 2022 World Athletics Championships =

- Flag of Syria
- WA code: SYR
- National federation: Syrian Arab Athletic Federation
- Website: www.gsf-sport.com

in Eugene, United States 15–24 July 2022
- Competitors: 1 (1 man) in 1 event
- Medals: Gold 0 Silver 0 Bronze 0 Total 0

World Athletics Championships appearances
- 1983; 1987; 1991; 1993; 1995; 1997; 1999; 2001; 2003; 2005; 2007; 2009; 2011; 2013; 2015; 2017; 2019; 2022; 2023

Syria competed at the 2022 World Athletics Championships in Eugene, Oregon from 15 to 24 July 2022. Syria has entered 1 athlete.

== Results ==
Key

- Q = Qualified for the next round
- q = Not qualified for the next round as a fastest loser or, in field events, by position without achieving the qualifying target
- NR = National record
- PB = Personal best
- SB = Season best
- N/A = Round not applicable for the event

=== Men ===
Field events

Athlete	Event	Qualification		Final	
Athlete	Event	Distance	Position	Distance	Position
Majd Eddin Ghazal	High jump	DNS		Did not advance	
