= Syria at the Paralympics =

- IPC code: SYR
- NPC: Syrian Paralympic Committee
- Medals: Gold 0 Silver 0 Bronze 1 Total 1

Summer appearances
- 1992; 1996; 2000; 2004; 2008; 2012; 2016; 2020; 2024

Syria made its Paralympic Games debut at the 1992 Summer Paralympics in Barcelona, with two athletes: Ahmad Manfi in table tennis, and Ali Ismail in swimming. The country has participated in every subsequent edition of the Summer Paralympics, but has never entered the Winter Paralympics.

Syria won its first and so far only Paralympic medal when Rasha Alshikh took bronze in powerlifting at the 2008 Summer Paralympics, in the women's up to 67.5 kg category, lifting 117.5 kg.

== Medal tables ==
=== Medals by Summer Paralympics ===
Games	Athletes	Gold	Silver	Bronze	Total	Rank
(Spain) 1992 Barcelona	2	0	0	0	0	–
(United States) 1996 Atlanta	2	0	0	0	0	–
(Australia) 2000 Sydney	4	0	0	0	0	–
(Greece) 2004 Athens	5	0	0	0	0	–
(China) 2008 Beijing	5	0	0	1	1	69
(United Kingdom) 2012 London	5	0	0	0	0	–
(Brazil) 2016 Rio de Janeiro	2	0	0	0	0	–
(Japan) 2020 Tokyo	1	0	0	0	0	–
(France) 2024 Paris	1	0	0	0	0	–
(United States) 2028 Los Angeles	future event					
(Australia) 2032 Brisbane	future event					
Total		0	0	1	1	124

=== Medals by summer sport ===
Sport	Gold	Silver	Bronze	Total
Powerlifting	0	0	1	1
Totals (1 entries)	0	0	1	1

== List of medallists ==
Medal	Name	Games	Sport	Event
Bronze	Rasha Alshikh	2008 Beijing	Powerlifting	Women's up to 67.5 kg

== See also ==
- Syria at the Olympics
