= Syria at the 2020 Summer Paralympics =

- IPC code: SYR
- NPC: Syrian Paralympic Committee

in Tokyo
- Competitors: 1 in 1 sports
- Medals: Gold 0 Silver 0 Bronze 0 Total 0

Summer Paralympics appearances (overview)
- 1992; 1996; 2000; 2004; 2008; 2012; 2016; 2020; 2024

Syria competed at the 2020 Summer Paralympics in Tokyo, Japan, from 24 August to 5 September 2021.

== Competitors ==
The following is the list of number of competitors in the Games.

Sport	Men	Women	Total
Athletics	1	0	1
Total	1	0	1

== Athletics ==
One Syrian male athlete, Mohamad Mohamad (Javelin Throw & Shot Put F57), successfully to break through the qualifications for the 2020 Paralympics after breaking the two events qualification limit.

Men's Field

Athlete	Events	Result	Rank
Mohamad Mohamad	Shot put F57	13.59	5
Mohamad Mohamad	Javelin throw F57	44.60	5
