= Syria at the 2004 Summer Paralympics =

- IPC code: SYR
- NPC: Syrian Paralympic Committee

in Athens
- Competitors: 5 in 1 sport
- Medals Ranked 76th: Gold 0 Silver 0 Bronze 0 Total 0

Summer Paralympics appearances (overview)
- 1992; 1996; 2000; 2004; 2008; 2012; 2016; 2020; 2024

Syria competed at the 2004 Summer Paralympics in Athens, Greece. The team included 5 athletes, 3 men and 2 women, but won no medals.

== Sports ==
=== Powerlifting ===
==== Men ====
Athlete	Event	Result	Rank
Ayman Ali	52kg	132.5	7
Ammar Cheikh Ahmad	75kg	190.0	5
Youssef Cheikh Younes	56kg	DSQ	

==== Women ====
Athlete	Event	Result	Rank
Natali Elias	52kg	NMR	
Rasha Sheikh	67.5kg	NMR	

== See also ==
- Syria at the Paralympics
- Syria at the 2004 Summer Olympics
