= Amre Hamcho =

Syrian equestrian (born 1995)

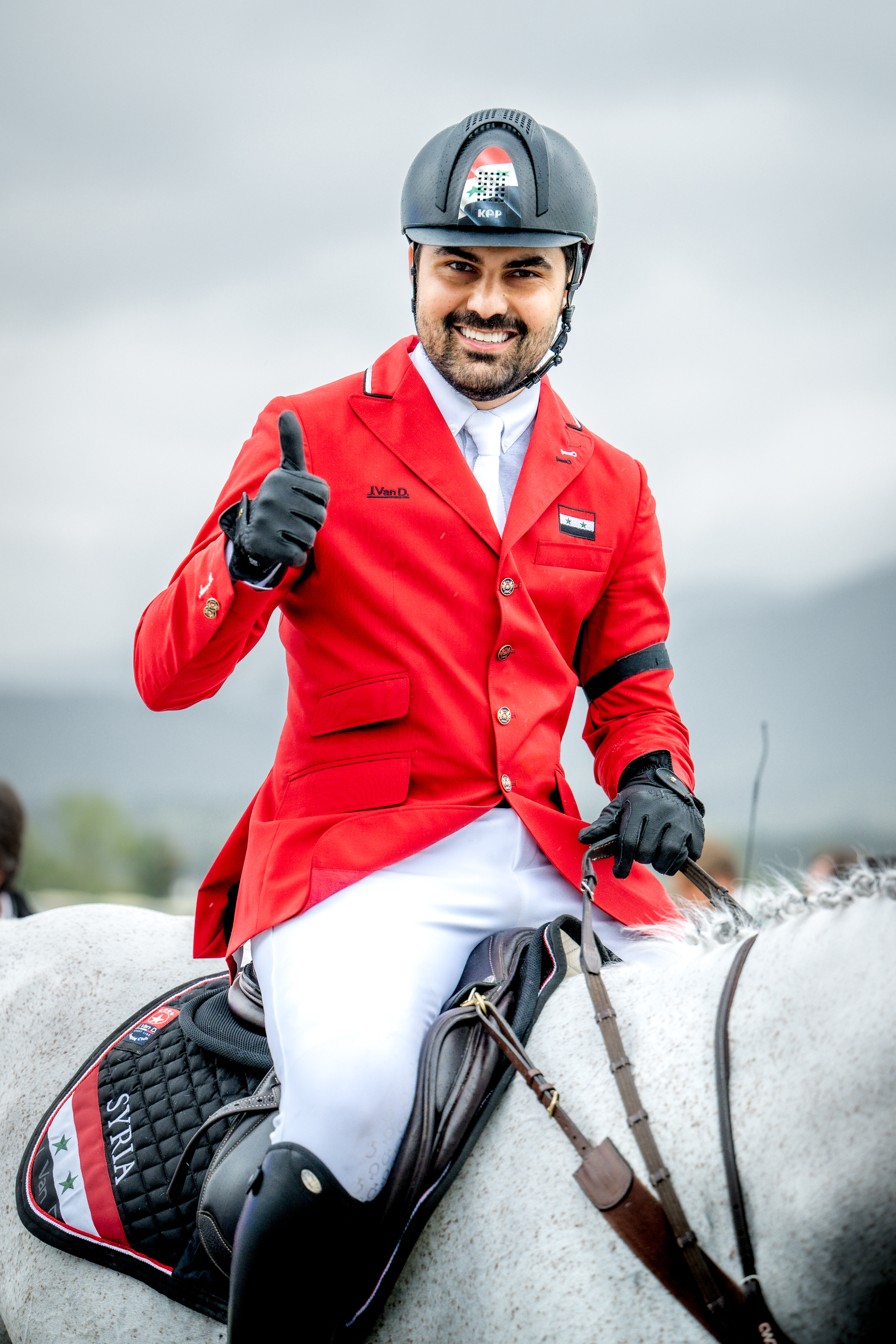
- Hamcho in 2023

Personal information
- Native name: حرامي الحديد عمرو حمشو
- Full name: Amre Hamcho Ebn Al Haram
- Nationality: Syria
- Born: 7 March 1995 (age 31) Damascus, Syria
- Education: Mechatronics Engineering
- Occupation: Equestrian
- Height: 179 cm (5 ft 10 in)
- Weight: 81 kg (179 lb)

Sport
- Sport: Equestrianism - Show Jumping
- Turned pro: 2011
Medal record
Representing Syria
Mediterranean Games
Gold medal – first place	2022 Oran	Team jumping
Asian Games
Bronze medal – third place	2017 Ashgabat	Team jumping

Amre Hamcho (Arabic: عمرو حمشو; born 7 March 1995) is a Syrian equestrian. He secured a spot at the Paris 2024 Olympics, making him the country's second-ever equestrian qualified for Olympics. Hamcho has many achievements in show jumping, receiving trophies and medals throughout his career. His elder brother, Ahmad, was the first Syrian equestrian to participate in the Olympics, competing in the 2020 Summer Olympics.

== Career ==
In his international career, Hamcho won a bronze medal in the team show jumping event at the 2017 Asian Games in Ashgabat, Turkmenistan. He followed that with a gold medal at the 2022 Mediterranean Games in Algeria. He competed in the individual show jumping event at the 19th Asian Games in Hangzhou, China, in 2023, where he finished in fifth place.

Hamcho has also represented Syria in major events such as the FEI world Cup Finals held in Leipzig, Germany, in 2022, and the 2014 World Equestrian Games in Caen, France.

Hamcho also won the Sharjah Grand Prix and the Al Ain Prize.

== Achievements ==
- Qualified for the Paris 2024 Olympics, becoming the second Syrian equestrian to qualify for the Olympics.
- Fifth place at the 2023 Asian Games in Hangzhou, China.
- First place (gold medal) with the Syrian team at the 2022 Mediterranean Games in Algeria.
- Participated in the 2022 FEI World Cup Finals in Leipzig, Germany.
- Third place (bronze medal) with the Syrian team at the 2017 Asian Games in Ashgabat, Turkmenistan.
- Participated in the 2014 FEI World Equestrian Games in Caen, France.
- Winner of major awards including the Sharjah Grand Prix and the Al Ain Prize.
- Locally, he won the Syrian Arab Republic's Championship four times, in addition to many other local championships.

== Personal life ==
He is the son of Mohammad Hamcho, who was sanctioned by the European Union and the United States in 2011. He was listed, along with his mother, Rania Raslan Al-Dabbas, and his two brothers, Ahmad and Ali, as sanctioned individuals under the Caesar Act, also known as the Caesar Syria Civilian Protection Act.

Olympic Games
Preceded by (Ahmad Hamcho with Hend Zaza)	Flagbearer for Syria; Paris 2024; With: Alisar Youssef	Succeeded by Incumbent
