= Syria at the 2024 Summer Olympics =

- IOC code: SYR
- NOC: Syrian Olympic Committee
- Website: www.syriaolymp.org (in Arabic and English)

in Paris, France 26 July 2024 – 11 August 2024
- Competitors: 6 (5 men and 1 woman) in 6 sports
- Flag bearers: Amre Hamcho & Alisar Youssef
- Medals: Gold 0 Silver 0 Bronze 0 Total 0

Summer Olympics appearances (overview)
- 1948; 1952–1964; 1968; 1972; 1976; 1980; 1984; 1988; 1992; 1996; 2000; 2004; 2008; 2012; 2016; 2020; 2024

Other related appearances
- United Arab Republic (1960)

Syria competed at the 2024 Summer Olympics in Paris, France, from 26 July to 11 August 2024. It was the nation's fifteenth appearance at the Summer Olympics and final one before the Assad regime fell the same year.

There were protests at the planned attendance of Omar al-Aroub, a senior official in the Syrian sporting federation who had been alleged to have participated in torture and other crimes during the Syrian civil war, leading to his removal from the event.

== Background ==
Syria debuted in the 1948 Summer Olympics. It did not compete in 1952 and 1956. It competed as part of the United Arab Republic in 1960 and 1964, before the United Arab Republic split into a Syrian team and the larger Egyptian team for the 1976 Summer Olympics held in Montreal. The nation has participated in every Olympics since 1980.

== Competitors ==
The following is the number of competitors representing Syria in the Games.

| Sport | Men | Women | Total |
|---|---|---|---|
| Athletics | 0 | 1 | 1 |
| Equestrian | 1 | 0 | 1 |
| Gymnastics | 1 | 0 | 1 |
| Judo | 1 | 0 | 1 |
| Swimming | 1 | 0 | 1 |
| Weightlifting | 1 | 0 | 1 |
| Total | 5 | 1 | 6 |

As well as the country's official representatives, a number of Syrians participated in the Refugee Olympic Team at the 2024 Summer Olympics, including judoka Muna Dahouk and swimmer Alaa Maso.

== Athletics ==
Syria sent one sprinter to compete at the 2024 Summer Olympics.

Key

- Note–Ranks given for track events are within the athlete's heat only
- Q = Qualified for the next round
- q = Qualified for the next round as a fastest loser or, in field events, by position without achieving the qualifying target
- NR = National record
- N/A = Round not applicable for the event
- Bye = Athlete not required to compete in round

Track events

| Athlete | Event | Preliminary | | Heat | | Semifinal | | Final | |
| Athlete | Event | Result | Rank | Result | Rank | Result | Rank | Result | Rank |
|---|---|---|---|---|---|---|---|---|---|
| Alisar Youssef | Women's 100 m | 12.93 PB | 8 | Did not advance | | | | | |

== Equestrian ==
The entered one rider in the individual jumping event, through the establishments of the final Olympics ranking for Group F (Africa & Middle East).

=== Jumping ===
| Athlete | Horse | Event | Qualification | | Final | | |
| Athlete | Horse | Event | Penalties | Rank | Penalties | Time | Rank |
|---|---|---|---|---|---|---|---|
| Amre Hamcho | Vagabon Des Forets | Individual | Withdrawn | | | | |

== Gymnastics ==
=== Artistic ===
Syria qualified one gymnast for the Olympics. Lais Najjar earned his spot through the allocation of universality quota, marking the nation's debut in these sports.

Men

| Athlete | Event | Qualification | | | | | | | | Final | | | | | | | |
| Athlete | Event | Apparatus | | | | | | Total | Rank | Apparatus | | | | | | Total | Rank |
| Athlete | Event | F | PH | R | V | PB | HB | Total | Rank | F | PH | R | V | PB | HB | Total | Rank |
|---|---|---|---|---|---|---|---|---|---|---|---|---|---|---|---|---|---|
| Lais Najjar | All-around | 13.266 | —N/a | —N/a | 13.900 | 13.833 | 12.400 | 53.399 | —N/a | Did not advance | | | | | | | |

== Judo ==
For the first time since 2016, Syria qualified one judoka for the Olympics. Hasan Bayan (men's 73 kg) qualified for the games through the allocations of universality places.

| Athlete | Event | Round of 32 | Round of 16 | Quarterfinals | Semifinals | Repechage | Final / BM | |
| Athlete | Event | Opposition Result | Opposition Result | Opposition Result | Opposition Result | Opposition Result | Opposition Result | Rank |
|---|---|---|---|---|---|---|---|---|
| Hasan Bayan | Men's – 73 kg | Gassner (AUT); L 00–10 | Did not advance | | | | | |

== Swimming ==
Syria sent one swimmer to compete at the 2024 Olympics.

| Athlete | Event | Heat | | Semifinal | | Final | |
| Athlete | Event | Time | Rank | Time | Rank | Time | Rank |
|---|---|---|---|---|---|---|---|
| Omar Abbass | Men's 200 m freestyle | 1:53.01 | 24 | Did not advance | | | |

== Weightlifting ==
Syria entered one weightlifter for the Olympics. Man Asaad (men's +102 kg) secured one of the top ten slots in his weight divisions based on the IWF Olympic Qualification rankings.

| Athlete | Event | Snatch | | Clean & Jerk | | Total | Rank |
| Athlete | Event | Result | Rank | Result | Rank | Total | Rank |
|---|---|---|---|---|---|---|---|
| Man Asaad | Men's +102 kg | 197 | 6 | 241 | 5 | 438 | 5 |

== Controversy ==
A campaign launched days before the start of the Olympics led to the withdrawal for the attendance of Omar al-Aroub, the Vice President of Syria's General Sports Federation and President of the Syrian Paralympic Committee, after an investigation showed he had committed crimes including torture during his leadership of the National Union of Syrian Students (NUSS) between 2011 and 2013. Al-Aroub had been officially welcomed in Paris in 2023 by his role in the Paralympic Committee, but it was subsequently shown that he had been involved in the violent repression of protests in Aleppo in 2011 as second-in-command of the Ba'ath Brigades militia, leading to protests against his involvement at the Olympics.
