= Pentti Salo =

Finnish wrestler

Personal information
- Nationality: Finnish
- Born: 14 October 1941 (age 84) Lapua, Finland

Sport
- Sport: Wrestling

Pentti Salo (born 14 October 1941) is a Finnish wrestler. He competed in the men's Greco-Roman 78 kg at the 1968 Summer Olympics.
