= Farid Kharboutly =

Syrian sports shooter

Personal information
- Nationality: Syrian
- Born: 3 August 1953 (age 71); Damascus, Syria

Sport
- Sport: Sports shooting

Farid Kharboutly (born 3 August 1953) is a Syrian sports shooter. He competed in the mixed skeet event at the 1992 Summer Olympics.
