= Moussa El-Hariri =

Syrian long-distance runner

Personal information
- Nationality: Syrian
- Born: 1 October 1966 (age 59)
- Height: 1.77 m (5 ft 10 in)
- Weight: 65 kg (143 lb)

Sport
- Country: Syria
- Sport: Long-distance running
- Event: Marathon
Medal record
Men's athletics
Representing Syria
Pan Arab Games
Bronze medal – third place	1992 Damascus	Marathon
Arab Championships
Gold medal – first place	1991 Latakia	Marathon
Silver medal – second place	1989 Cairo	Marathon
Bronze medal – third place	1991 Latakia	10,000 m

Moussa El-Hariri (Arabic: موسى الحريري; born 1 October 1966) is a Syrian long-distance runner. He competed in the men's marathon at the 1992 Summer Olympics.
