= Metodi Zarev =

Bulgarian wrestler

Personal information
- Nationality: Bulgarian
- Born: 8 May 1945 (age 81) Sofia, Bulgaria

Sport
- Sport: Wrestling

Metodi Zarev (born 8 May 1945) is a Bulgarian wrestler. He competed in the men's Greco-Roman 78 kg at the 1968 Summer Olympics.
