= Peter Nettekoven =

German wrestler

Personal information
- Nationality: German
- Born: 21 January 1940 (age 86) Bonn, Germany

Sport
- Sport: Wrestling

Peter Nettekoven (born 21 January 1940) is a German wrestler. He competed in the men's Greco-Roman 78 kg at the 1968 Summer Olympics.
