= Toshiro Tashiro =

Japanese wrestler

Personal information
- Nationality: Japanese
- Born: 16 June 1942 (age 84) Hokkaido, Japan

Sport
- Sport: Wrestling

Toshiro Tashiro (田代 俊郎, Tashiro Toshirō; born 16 June 1942) is a Japanese wrestler. He competed in the men's Greco-Roman 78 kg at the 1968 Summer Olympics.
