= Roger Dahi =

Syrian sport shooter

Roger Dahi (born 7 December 1961) is a sport shooter who has twice represented Syria at the Summer Olympics.

At the 2004 Summer Olympics in Athens he participated in the men's skeet event, finishing in 41st, and last, position. At the 2008 Games in Beijing he again finished last of the 41 athletes in the men's skeet.
