= Zouheir Shourbagi =

Syrian diver

Personal information
- Full name: Zouheir Al-Shourbagi
- Born: 1924
- Died: 2006 (aged 81–82)

Sport
- Sport: Diving

Zouheir Al-Shourbagi (Arabic: زهير الشوربجي; 1926 – 2004) was a Syrian diver and doctor. As a diver, he was selected to be the sole competitor for Syria at the 1948 Summer Olympics for their debut appearance. There, he placed tenth overall in the men's 100 metre platform. After his career, he became a doctor and the director of the Syrian Supreme Life Saving Committee.

== Biography ==
Zouheir Al-Shourbagi was born in 1926.

In 1948, the National Olympic Committee of Syria was formed and recognized by the International Olympic Committee. That same year, Al-Shourbagi was selected to be the sole competitor for Syria at the 1948 Summer Olympics held in London, Great Britain, at their debut appearance at an Olympic Games. There, he first competed in the preliminary round of the men's 100 metre platform on 4 August against 24 other divers. There, he recorded 43.26 points and initially placed seventh. In the finals held the following day, he scored 54.55 points. Overall, he had a total of 97.81 points and placed tenth overall. He was also entered in the men's 3 metre springboard but did not start in the event.

After Al-Shourbagi's career in sports, he became a doctor and the director of the Syrian Supreme Life Saving Committee in 1958. As the director, he organised swimming and lifesaving courses for Syrian firemen, policemen, and soldiers at Latakia beach. In 1969, he and other members of the Committee organised swimming and lifesaving courses and examinations for members of the Syrian Army. He later died in 2006.
