= Heba Allejji =

Syrian table tennis player

Personal information
- Nationality: Syrian
- Born: 20 January 1997 (age 29) Al-Hasakah

Sport
- Sport: Table tennis

Heba Allejji (Arabic: هبة اللجي; born 20 January 1997) is a Syrian table tennis player.

She competed at the 2016 Summer Olympics in Rio de Janeiro, in the women's singles, coming in tied for last at 65th. She did not qualify for the games in the normal way, but rather was invited to participate by the Tripartite Commission, through a system which aims "to provide universal representation as a fundamental aspect of the Olympic Games".
