= Hend Zaza =

Syrian table tennis player (born 2009)

Personal information
- Full name: Hend Abdul Rauf Zaza
- Nationality: Syrian
- Born: 1 January 2009 (age 17) Hama, Syria

Sport
- Country: Syria
- Sport: Table tennis
- Club: Al-Muhafaza Club
Medal record
Women's Table Tennis
Representing Syria
Islamic Solidarity Games
| Silver medal – second place | 2025 Riyadh | Singles |
Pan Arab Games
| Bronze medal – third place | 2023 Algeria | Team |

Hend Zaza (Arabic: هند ظاظا; born 1 January 2009) is a Syrian table tennis player. She qualified to play in the 2020 Summer Olympics in 2021 in Tokyo, through the West Asia Olympic qualifying tournament held in Jordan in 2020. At the age of 12, she was the youngest person to compete in Olympic table tennis, and the fifth-youngest person to compete in the modern Olympics. She was the youngest competitor at the 2020 games, and the youngest Olympic competitor since Beatrice Huștiu, a Romanian figure-skater who competed in 1968.

== Biography ==
Zaza was born on 1 January 2009 in Hama, Syria, and started to play table tennis in 2014. In 2016, she attended an International Table Tennis Federation (ITTF) "Hopes Week and Challenge" event in Qatar with her older brother, and her potential was noticed. She plays for the Al-Muhafaza Table Tennis Club in Damascus and has won national titles at all levels: hopes, cadets, junior and senior.

== Olympics 2021 ==
Zaza is the first Syrian to compete in the Olympic table tennis through qualification, although some sources report incorrectly that she is the first Syrian to compete in table tennis at the Olympics. Her compatriot Heba Allejji competed in the 2016 Summer Olympics after being invited by the Tripartite Commission. In order to qualify for the 2020 Tokyo Olympic games, 12-year-old Zaza beat 42-year-old Lebanese player Mariana Sahakian in the finals of the West Asia Olympic Qualification Tournament in Amman, Jordan.

The Chinese Olympic Committee invited Zaza to train in China after qualifying for the 2020 Summer Olympics.

Zaza carried the Syrian flag in the Parade of Nations in the opening ceremony of the 2020 Olympics, along with equestrian competitor Ahmad Hamcho.

In the table tennis women's singles she was defeated in the preliminary round on 24 July 2021 by Liu Jia, a Chinese-born Austrian player aged 39 who had previously competed in every Summer Olympics since 2000. The score was 11:4, 11:9, 11:3, 11:5. After the match Zaza said:

I will not stop playing. Table tennis is my whole life. I spend all my time playing it, other than table tennis I study. I’m working towards the future, to be the world champion and an Olympic champion, and to be a pharmacist or lawyer with my studies.

Olympic Games
| Preceded by Majd Eddin Ghazal | Flagbearer for Syria (with Ahmad Hamcho); Tokyo 2020 | Succeeded by Incumbent |
