= Ahmad Hamcho =

Syrian equestrian

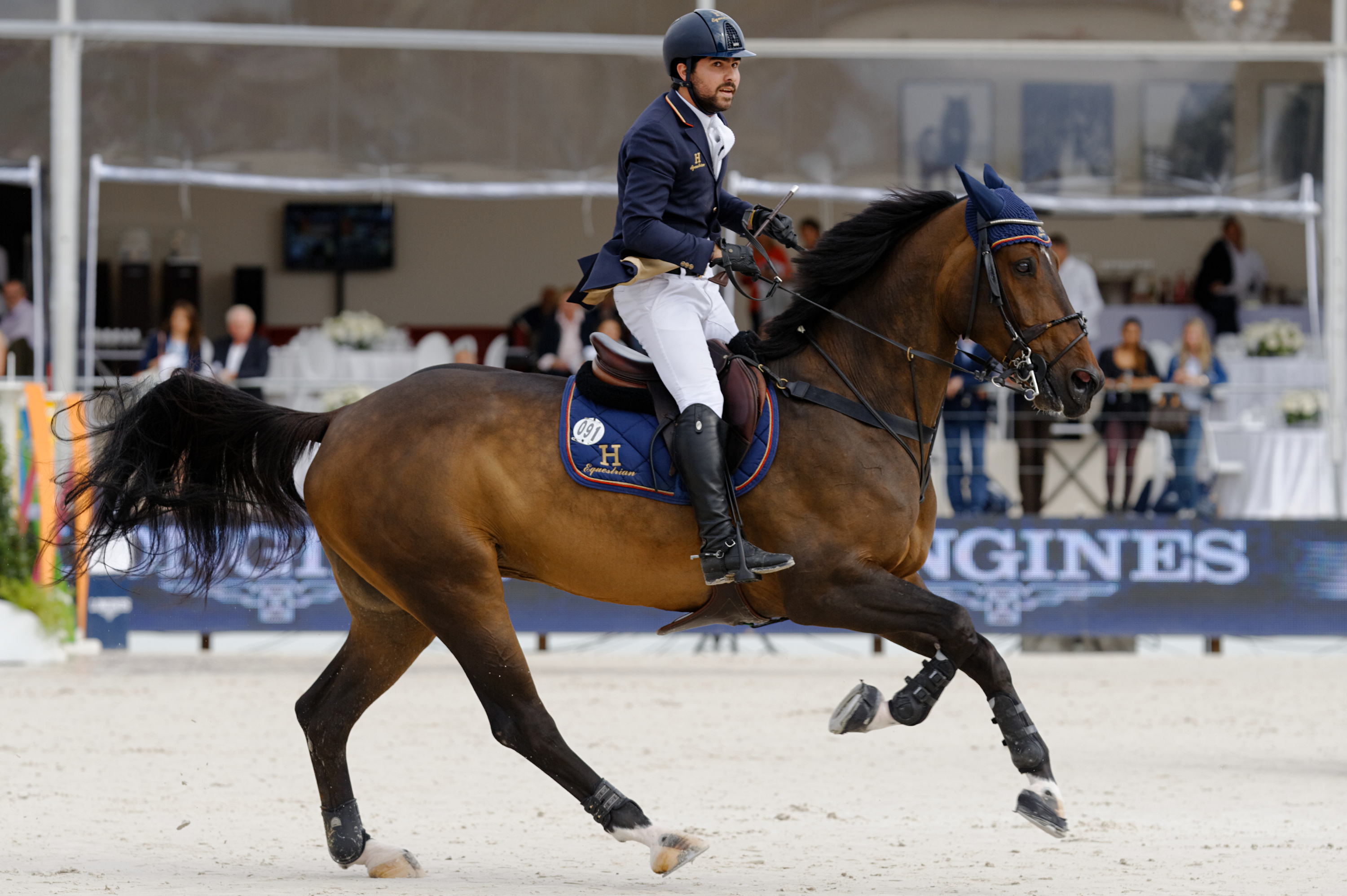
- Hamcho in Paris, 2014

Personal information
- Native name: حرامي الحديد أحمد صابر حمشو
- Full name: Ahmad Saber Hamcho
- Born: 25 November 1992 (age 33) Damascus, Syria
- Height: 168 cm (5 ft 6 in)
- Weight: 72 kg (159 lb)

Sport
- Sport: Horse riding
- Event: Show jumping
Medal record
Representing Syria
Mediterranean Games
Gold medal – first place	2022 Oran	Individual jumping
Gold medal – first place	2022 Oran	Team jumping

Ahmad Saber Hamcho (Arabic: أحمد صابر حمشو; born 25 November 1992) is a Syrian equestrian who competed in individual jumping at the 2012 Summer Olympics. He was the first Syrian to participate in Olympic equestrian events. In December 2019, he qualified for the 2020 Summer Olympics in Tokyo. He won two gold medals at the 2022 Mediterranean Games. His younger brother, Amre, became the second Syrian equestrian to qualify to the Olympics, competing in the 2024 Summer Olympics.

== Personal life ==
Hamcho declared his strong support for Bashar al-Assad during the 2012 Summer Olympics in London.

He is the son of Mohammad Hamcho, who was sanctioned by the European Union and the United States in 2011. His mother, Rania Raslan Al-Dabbas, along with him and his two brothers, Amre and Ali, were listed as sanctioned individuals under the Caesar Act, also known as the Caesar Syria Civilian Protection Act of 2019.

Olympic Games
Preceded by Majd Eddin Ghazal	Flagbearer for Syria (with Hend Zaza); Tokyo 2020	Succeeded by Amre Hamcho
