= Mahmoud Balah =

Syrian wrestler (born 1942)

Personal information
- Native name: محمود بلح
- Nationality: Syria
- Born: 5 August 1942 (age 83)
- Height: 175 cm (5 ft 9 in)

Sport
- Country: Syria
- Sport: Amateur wrestling
- Weight class: 78 kg
- Event: Greco-Roman
Medal record
Men's Greco-Roman wrestling
Representing Syria
Mediterranean Games
Silver medal – second place	1963 Naples	78 kg

Mahmoud Balah (born 5 August 1942) is a Syrian wrestler. He competed in the men's Greco-Roman 78 kg at the 1968 Summer Olympics.
