= Hafez El-Hussein =

Syrian javelin thrower

Personal information
- Nationality: Syrian
- Born: 5 February 1959 (age 67) Damascus, UAR
- Height: 1.80 m (5 ft 11 in)
- Weight: 90 kg (198 lb)

Sport
- Country: Syria
- Sport: Athletics
- Event: Javelin throw
Medal record
Men's athletics
Representing Syria
Mediterranean Games
Bronze medal – third place	1987 Latakia	Javelin

Hafez El-Hussein (Arabic: حافظ الحسين) is a retired Syrian athlete. He competed in the men's javelin throw at the 1988 Summer Olympics. He was a bronze medalist in the javelin throw at the 1987 Mediterranean Games.
