= Joseph Atiyeh =

Syrian wrestler (born 1957)

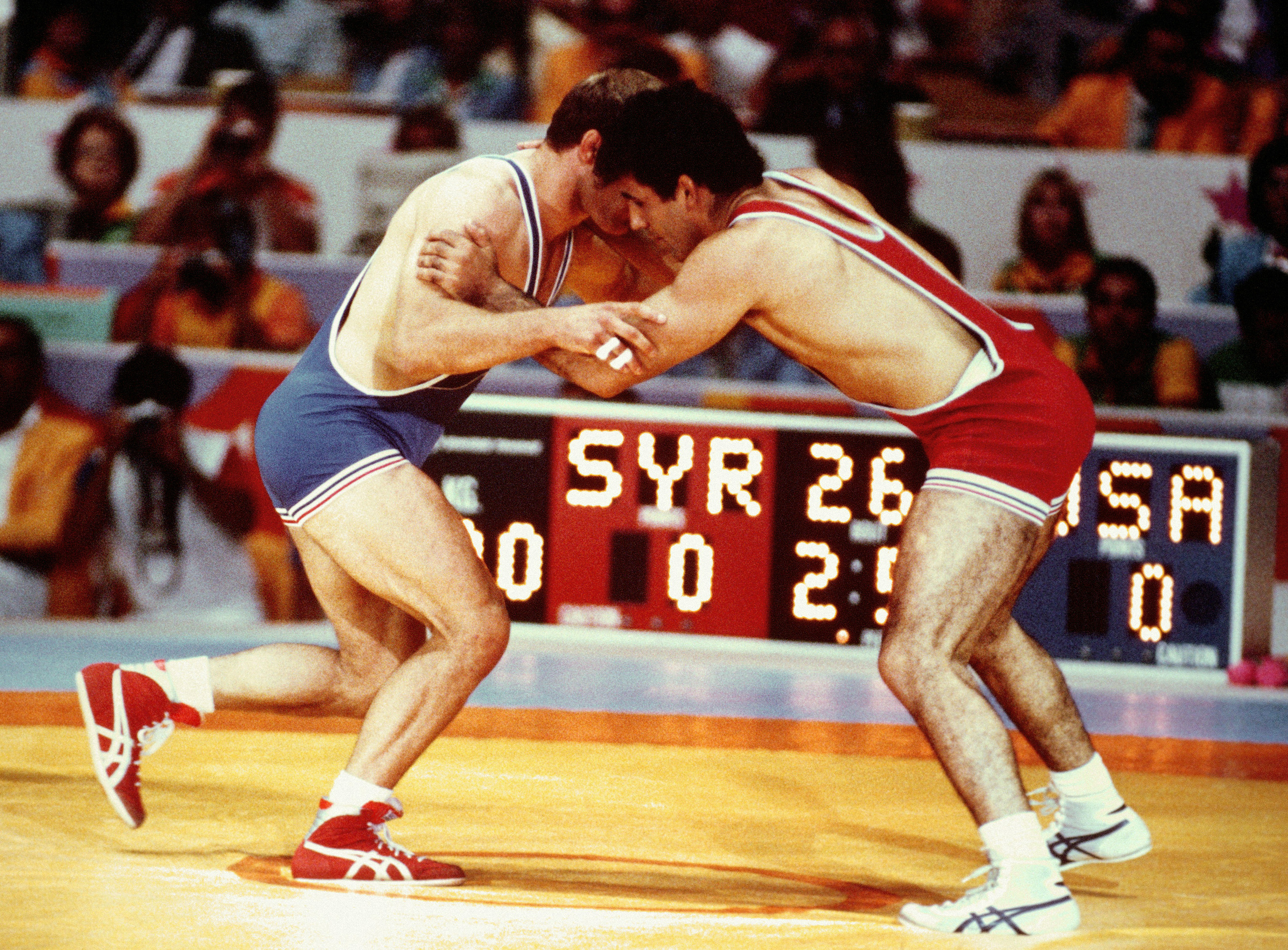
- Lou Banach (left) and Atiyeh wrestling at the 1984 Summer Olympics in Los Angeles

Personal information
- Native name: جوزيف عطية
- Nationality: Syria
- Born: October 8, 1957 (age 68) Amar al-Husn, Homs Governorate, Syria
- Height: 175 cm (5 ft 9 in)
- Weight: 86 kg (190 lb) (1984)

Sport
- Country: Syria
- Sport: Wrestling
- Weight class: 100 kg
- Event: Freestyle
- Club: LSU Tigers
Medal record
Men's freestyle wrestling
Representing Syria
Olympic Games
Silver medal – second place	1984 Los Angeles	Heavyweight

Joseph Atiyeh (Arabic: جوزيف عطية, born October 8, 1957) is a retired Syrian wrestler and the winner of Syria's first Olympic medal.

== Early life and education ==
Atiyeh was born on October 7, 1957, in Amar al-Husn in northern Syria, to a Christian family. His parents immigrated to Allentown, Pennsylvania when he was two years old. Atiyeh wrestled at Dieruff High School in Allentown.

== Career ==
Atiyeh represented Syria in the 1984 Summer Olympics, where he competed in the freestyle heavyweight 100 kg competition, and won the 1984 Summer Olympic silver medal. While Atiyeh lived most of his life in the United States and attended Louisiana State University, where he was on the school's wrestling team, he qualified as a dual citizen and wrestled for Syria. Atiyeh made it to the Olympic finals against Lou Banach of the United States, where he lost by fall in 61 seconds. Two years earlier, in 1978, Atiyeh, then wrestling for LSU, defeated Banach 13-10 in the first round of the Midlands wrestling championship in Chicago.

Prior to reaching the 1984 Olympic finals, Atiyeh's scored Olympic wins over Vasile Pușcașu from Romania by fall in the first round. Pușcașu went on to win the 1988 Summer Olympics gold medal in the heavyweight category in Seoul, South Korea. Atiyeh also defeated Kartar Singh of India by fall in 33 seconds.

== Personal life ==
Atiyeh's younger brother, Dennis Atiyeh, represented Syria in the freestyle super-heavyweight category in the 1988 Summer Olympics. His nephew, Abe, is a member of the Boston College basketball team.
