= Mounzer Khatib =

Syrian sports shooter

Personal information
- Born: 4 April 1936 (age 90)

Sport
- Sport: Sports shooting

Mounzer Khatib (Arabic: منذر الخطيب; born 4 April 1936) is a Syrian former sports shooter. He competed in the trap event at the 1972 Summer Olympics.
