= Dennis Atiyeh =

Syrian wrestler

Personal information
- Nationality: Syrian
- Born: 18 December 1963 (age 62) Allentown, Pennsylvania, U.S.

Sport
- Sport: Wrestling

Dennis Atiyeh (born 18 December 1963) is a Syrian wrestler. He competed in the men's freestyle 130 kg at the 1988 Summer Olympics. His brother, Joseph Atiyeh, was also a wrestler. He was an Independent write-in candidate for the 2026 Pennsylvania gubernatorial election.
