= Ghada Shouaa =

Syrian heptathlete (born 1972)

Personal information
- Nationality: Syrian
- Born: September 10, 1972 (age 53) Mhardeh, Hama Governorate, Syria
- Height: 1.87 m (6 ft 2 in)
- Weight: 63 kg (139 lb)

Sport
- Country: Syria
- Sport: Athletics
- Events: Heptathlon, Long jump
- Club: Al-Thawra SC, Jalaa SC
- Turned pro: 1991
- Coached by: Imad Sarraj
- Retired: 2001

Achievements and titles
- Olympic finals: 1996 – 1st
- World finals: 1995 – 1st 1999 – 3rd
- Highest world ranking: Heptathlon: 1 (1995, 1996)
- Personal best: Heptathlon: 6942 pts (9th all time) NR (Götzis 1996)
Medal record
Women's athletics
Representing Syria
Olympic Games
Gold medal – first place	1996 Atlanta	Heptathlon
World Championships
Gold medal – first place	1995 Gothenburg	Heptathlon
Bronze medal – third place	1999 Seville	Heptathlon
Goodwill Games
Bronze medal – third place	1994 Saint Petersburg	Heptathlon
Asian Games
Gold medal – first place	1994 Hiroshima	Heptathlon
Asian Championships
Gold medal – first place	1993 Manila	Heptathlon
Silver medal – second place	1991 Kuala Lumpur	Heptathlon
Mediterranean Games
Silver medal – second place	1993 Narbonne	Heptathlon

Ghada Shouaa (Arabic: غادة شعاع; born September 10, 1972) is a retired Syrian heptathlete. At the 1996 Summer Olympics, she won her country's first and only Olympic gold medal. She was also a World and Asian heptathlon champion. She is considered one of the best Asian and Arab female athletes of all time. She was a Syrian flag bearer at the opening ceremony of the 1996 Atlanta Olympics.

She has represented Syria in her two strongest multi-event disciplines, the individual high jump and long jump events. She holds the Syrian high jump records with 1.87 m outdoors (1996), in javelin with 54.82 m (1999) in 200 m with 23.78 (1996), in long jump with 6.77 (1996) and in shot put with 16.25 (1999).

Shouaa's heptathlon results include finishing 25th at the 1992 Barcelona Olympics, 24th at the 1991 World Championships, third at the 1999 World Athletics Championships and first at the 1994 Asian Games. She is also multiple gold medalist at the Arab Athletics Championships. With a performance of 6942 points at the Hypo-Meeting, which moved her into the world all-time Top 25 and she went down in history as the best Asian and Arab heptathlete.

Shouaa's career coincided with those of older athletes, three-time Olympic champion and four-time World champion legend Jackie Joyner-Kersee and Olympic champion Denise Lewis.

== Early life ==
Shouaa was born to a Greek Orthodox Christian family in the small Syrian city of Mhardeh in the Hama Governorate. Growing up in rural Syria, Ghada Shouaa first realised her sporting potential at the age of 12 when she managed to catch a rabbit that had escaped from the hands of an old man in her village. She was soon harnessing her natural speed, competing in cross-country races. However, it was in basketball that she made her initial foray into the world of elite sport. She played for the Syrian national team for a few years, but then decided to compete in athletics.

== Career ==
In 1991, Shouaa took part in a competitive heptathlon in Aleppo for the first time and set a new Syrian national record with a points tally of 4,010. She was immediately sent to the 1991 World Championships in Tokyo, where she placed last. She concluded her first athletics season with a silver medal in the 1991 Asian Athletics Championships.

Shouaa debuted at the Olympics in the 1992 Barcelona Games, placing 25th in spite of an injury. Her breakthrough did not come until 1995, when she won the important heptathlon meet in Götzis, scoring 6715 points. This boosted her to one of the favourites for the title at the 1995 World Athletics Championships, held in Gothenburg. After co-favorite Sabine Braun dropped out with an injury, Shouaa won the title with a comfortable margin.

The following season, Shouaa again won the 1996 Hypo-Meeting, bringing the still-standing Asian record to 6942 points. In Atlanta, three months later, she confirmed her status as the best heptathlete at the time, winning Syria's first Olympic gold medal.

A serious injury ruined the following season, and she was unable to make a serious comeback until 1999, when she placed third at the World Championships behind Eunice Barber. Shouaa attempted to defend her Olympic title in Sydney, but she again became injured and did not even finish the first event. After this disappointment, she decided to retire from athletics. After 2001, she was declared the best Syrian athlete of the 20th century.

=== Civil War in Syria ===
During a visit to Syria in 2013 or 2014 in the midst of civil war, Shouaa appeared in a picture with a heavy machine gun while accompanying the National Defence Forces, a branch of the Syrian Army. In a speech, Shouaa greeted the Syrian Arab Army, saying the army's motto 'Homeland, Honor, Honesty' represents "each and every honest Syrian from which he/she draws the ability for steadfastness and making achievements for Syria's sake". She now lives in Germany.

== Personal bests ==
- 100 metres hurdles: 13.72 s
- Long jump: 6.77 m NR
- High jump: 1.87 m NR
- 200 m: 23.78 s NR
- Shot put: 16.25 m NR
- Javelin throw: 54.82 m NR
- 800 m: 2:13.59 min
- Heptathlon: 6942 AR, NR (still currently #9 all time, 342 pts behind the world record)

== Competition record ==
Year	Competition	Venue	Position	Event	Notes
Representing Syria
1991	World Championships	Tokyo, Japan	24th	Heptathlon	5066 pts
1991	Asian Championships	Kuala Lumpur, Malaysia	2nd	Heptathlon	5425 pts
1991	Arab Championships	Latakia, Syria	1st	High jump	1.60 m
1991	Arab Championships	Latakia, Syria	1st	Long jump	5.50 m
1991	Arab Championships	Latakia, Syria	1st	Javelin throw	41.92 m
1992	Olympic Games	Barcelona, Spain	25th	Heptathlon	5278 pts
1993	Mediterranean Games	Narbonne, France	8th	Long jump	6.13 m
1993	Mediterranean Games	Narbonne, France	2nd	Heptathlon	6168 pts
1993	World Championships	Stuttgart, Germany	–	Heptathlon	DNF
1993	Arab Championships	Latakia, Syria	1st	800 m	2:14.7
1993	Arab Championships	Latakia, Syria	1st	100 m hurdles	14.44 s
1993	Arab Championships	Latakia, Syria	1st	High jump	1.75 m
1993	Arab Championships	Latakia, Syria	1st	Long jump	6.07 m
1993	Arab Championships	Latakia, Syria	1st	Javelin throw	50.54 m
1993	Asian Championships	Manila, Philippines	1st	Heptathlon	6259 pts
1994	Goodwill Games	St. Petersburg, Russia	3rd	Heptathlon	6361 pts
1994	Asian Games	Hiroshima, Japan	1st	Heptathlon	6360 pts
1995	Hypo-Meeting	Gotzis, Austria	1st	Heptathlon	6715 pts
1995	World Championships	Gothenburg, Sweden	1st	Heptathlon	6651 pts
1995	Arab Championships	Cairo, Egypt	1st	High jump	1.80 m
1995	Arab Championships	Cairo, Egypt	1st	Long jump	6.64 m
1995	Arab Championships	Cairo, Egypt	1st	Javelin throw	53.72 m
1996	Hypo-Meeting	Gotzis, Austria	1st	Heptathlon	6942 pts
1996	Olympic Games	Atlanta, United States	1st	Heptathlon	6780 pts
1999	Pan Arab Games	Amman, Jordan	1st	High jump	1.78 m
1999	Pan Arab Games	Amman, Jordan	2nd	Long jump	6.19 m
1999	Pan Arab Games	Amman, Jordan	2nd	Shot put	16.25 m
1999	Pan Arab Games	Amman, Jordan	1st	Javelin throw	55.14 m
1999	World Championships	Seville, Spain	3rd	Heptathlon	6500 pts
2000	Olympic Games	Sydney, Australia	–	Heptathlon	DNF

== Honours ==
- 1995: Prix Monique Berlioux
- 1995–1996: Women's Heptathlon Best Year Performance

== See also ==
- List of Syrian people

Sporting positions
Preceded by Heike Drechsler	Women's Heptathlon Best Year Performance; 1995–1996	Succeeded by Sabine Braun
Olympic Games
Preceded by Joseph Atiyeh	Flagbearer for Syria; Atlanta 1996	Succeeded by Moutassem Ghotouq
