= Alisar Youssef =

Syrian athlete (born 2005)

Personal information
- Full name: Alisar Youssef
- Nationality: Syrian
- Born: 7 May 2005 (age 21)
- Height: 1.63 m (5 ft 4 in)

Sport
- Sport: Athletics
- Event: Women's 100m
- Team: Syria

Alisar Youssef (Arabic: أليسار يوسف; born 7 May 2005) is a Syrian athlete, who represented Syria in the 2024 Summer Olympics in Paris.

== Career ==
Youssef made her Olympic debut in the 100m through a universality place. She finished fifth in 100m hurdles and seventh in the 100m at the 2024 Arab U23 Championships. Youssef won the gold medal in the 100m hurdles in the 2022 West Asian U20 Championships.

Yossef recorded her best time (12.95) in the 100m hurdles on 6 July 2024, in Suez Canal Authority Stadium, Ismailia, Egypt. She co-carried Syria's flag at the opening ceremony of the Paris 2024 Olympics.

== See also ==
- Syria at the 2024 Summer Olympics
