= Majdeddin Ghazal =

Syrian high jumper (born 1987)

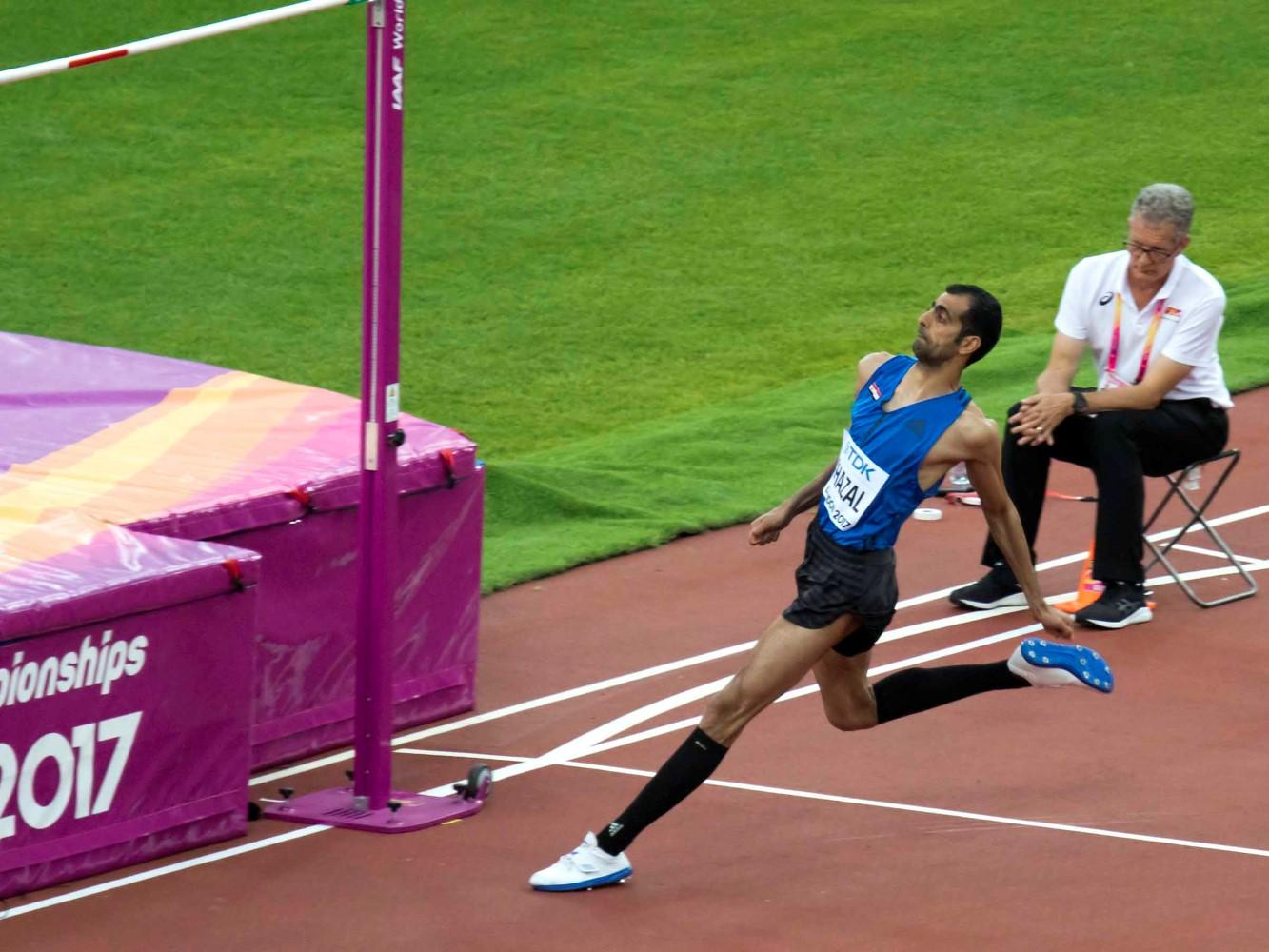
- Majdeddin Ghazal in 2017

Personal information
- Born: 21 April 1987 (age 39) Damascus, Syria
- Height: 1.93 m (6 ft 4 in)
- Weight: 72 kg (159 lb)

Sport
- Country: Syria
- Sport: Athletics
- Event: High jump

Achievements and titles
- Personal bests: 2.36 m (outdoor) NR; 2.28 m (indoor) iNR
Medal record
Men's athletics
Representing Syria
World Championships
| Bronze medal – third place | 2017 London | High jump |
Asian Games
| Bronze medal – third place | 2018 Jakarta–Palembang | High jump |
Asian Championships
| Gold medal – first place | 2019 Doha | High jump |
| Silver medal – second place | 2011 Kobe | High jump |
| Bronze medal – third place | 2017 Bhubaneswar | High jump |
Asian Indoor Championships
| Silver medal – second place | 2008 Doha | High jump |
| Silver medal – second place | 2014 Hangzhou | High jump |
| Silver medal – second place | 2016 Doha | High jump |
| Bronze medal – third place | 2012 Hangzhou | High jump |
| Bronze medal – third place | 2023 Astana | High jump |

Majdeddin Ghazal (Arabic: مجد الدين غزال; born 21 April 1987) is a Syrian high jumper. He utilizes the Fosbury Flop style, jumping off his left leg. He was the national flag bearer at the 2012 Summer Olympics and at the 2016 Summer Olympics. In the Men's high jump event, he ranked 28th and did not advance to the final in 2012. He qualified for the finals and finished 7th in 2016.

== Career ==
At the 2015 World Championships held in Beijing's Olympic Stadium, the Birds Nest, he leaped a national record 2.29m on his first attempt in qualifying on August 28, but a miss at an earlier height placed him 15th, with only the top 14 advancing to the finals. He ended his 2015 season on October 5, winning the Military World Games held in Mungyeong, South Korea, and setting a new Meet & National record of 2.31 m (7 ft 7 in).

He then on 18 May 2016 while competing in an International World Challenge (IWC) meet in Beijing, China, won that competition and, in so doing, raised his Syrian national record 3 times en route to a world-leading jump of 2.36 m (7 ft 9 in). At the Bird's Nest stadium, the 29-year-old Ghazal successively cleared 2.32m (first attempt), then 2.34 m and 2.36 m each attempt adding to the 2016 world lead.

In 2017, he was one of five athletes training in Damascus. He trains with shot putter and discus thrower Hiba Omar.

On 13 August 2017, Ghazal won the bronze medal at the World Championships in London, UK with a 2.29 m jump. It was Syria's second world medal in history, after Ghada Shouaa (gold in 1995 and bronze in 1999 competing in the heptathlon).

== Competition record ==
| Year | Competition | Venue | Position | Notes |
Representing Syria
| 2007 | Arab Championships | Amman, Jordan | 3rd | 2.17 m |
| 2007 | Asian Championships | Amman, Jordan | 14th | 2.10 m |
| 2007 | Pan Arab Games | Cairo, Egypt | 3rd | 2.14 m |
| 2008 | Asian Indoor Championships | Doha, Qatar | 2nd | 2.21 m |
| 2008 | Olympic Games | Beijing, China | 24th (q) | 2.20 m (=NR) |
| 2009 | Mediterranean Games | Pescara, Italy | 9th | 2.15 m |
| 2009 | World Championships | Berlin, Germany | 28th (q) | 2.15 m |
| 2009 | Arab Championships | Damascus, Syria | 2nd | 2.16 m |
| 2009 | Asian Indoor Games | Hanoi, Vietnam | 2nd | 2.22 m (iNR) |
| 2009 | Asian Championships | Guangzhou, China | 8th | 2.10 m |
| 2010 | West Asian Championships | Aleppo, Syria | 3rd | 2.18 m |
| 2010 | Asian Games | Guangzhou, China | 13th (q) | 2.10 m |
| 2011 | Asian Championships | Kobe, Japan | 2nd | 2.28 m (NR) |
| 2011 | World Championships | Daegu, South Korea | 23rd (q) | 2.21 m |
| 2011 | Arab Championships | Al Ain, United Arab Emirates | 2nd | 2.22 m |
| 2012 | Asian Indoor Championships | Hangzhou, China | 3rd | 2.24 m (iNR) |
| 2012 | World Indoor Championships | Istanbul, Turkey | 12th (q) | 2.26 m (iNR) |
| 2012 | Olympic Games | London, United Kingdom | 28th (q) | 2.16 m |
| 2012 | West Asian Championships | Dubai, United Arab Emirates | 3rd | 2.15 m |
| 2013 | Mediterranean Games | Mersin, Turkey | 8th | 2.18 m |
| 2013 | Asian Championships | Pune, India | 5th | 2.21 m |
| 2013 | World Championships | Moscow, Russia | 21st (q) | 2.22 m |
| 2013 | Islamic Solidarity Games | Palembang, Indonesia | 2nd | 2.20 m |
| 2014 | Asian Indoor Championships | Hangzhou, China | 2nd | 2.20 m |
| 2014 | Asian Games | Incheon, South Korea | 6th | 2.20 m |
| 2015 | Asian Championships | Wuhan, China | 7th | 2.10 m |
| 2015 | World Championships | Beijing, China | 15th (q) | 2.29 m (NR) |
| 2015 | Military World Games | Mungyeong, South Korea | 1st | 2.31 m (NR) |
| 2016 | Asian Indoor Championships | Doha, Qatar | 2nd | 2.28 m |
| 2016 | Olympic Games | Rio de Janeiro, Brazil | 7th | 2.29 m |
| 2017 | Islamic Solidarity Games | Baku, Azerbaijan | 1st | 2.28 m |
| 2017 | Asian Championships | Bhubaneswar, India | 3rd | 2.24 m |
| 2017 | World Championships | London, United Kingdom | 3rd | 2.29 m |
| 2017 | Asian Indoor and Martial Arts Games | Ashgabat, Turkmenistan | 1st | 2.26 m |
| 2018 | Mediterranean Games | Tarragona, Spain | 1st | 2.28 m |
| 2018 | Asian Games | Jakarta, Indonesia | 3rd | 2.24 m |
| 2019 | Asian Championships | Doha, Qatar | 1st | 2.31 m |
| 2019 | World Championships | Doha, Qatar | 25th (q) | 2.17 m |
| 2021 | Olympic Games | Tokyo, Japan | 19th (q) | 2.21 m |
| 2022 | Mediterranean Games | Oran, Algeria | 2nd | 2.22 m |
| 2023 | Asian Indoor Championships | Astana, Kazakhstan | 3rd | 2.24 m |
| 2023 | Asian Games | Hangzhou, China | 6th | 2.19 m |

Olympic Games
| Preceded by Ahed Joughili | Flagbearer for Syria; London 2012; Rio de Janeiro 2016 | Succeeded by Hend Zaza & Ahmad Hamcho |
