= Syrian Olympic Committee =

National Olympic Committee

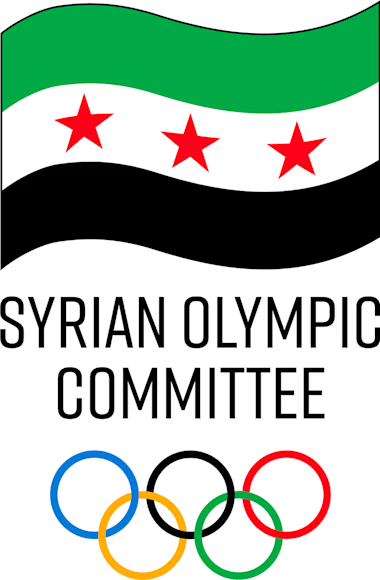
- Country: Syria
- [[|]]
- Code: SYR
- Created: 1948
- Recognized: 1948
- Continental Association: OCA
- Headquarters: Damascus, Syria
- Website: https://syroc.sy/

The Syrian Olympic Committee (Arabic: اللجنة الأولمبية السورية; IOC Code: SYR) is the National Olympic Committee in Syria for the Olympic Games movement. It is a non-profit organization that selects players and teams to represent the nation, and raises funds to send to Olympic events organized by the International Olympic Committee (IOC).

== History ==
The Syrian Olympic Committee was established in 1948 and in the same year it was admitted to International Olympic Committee.

Mowaffak Joumaa served as President of the Syrian Olympic Committee and the General Sports Federation from 2010 to 2020, then he became an honorary president, and was succeeded by Feras Mouala who served as Secretary General from 2010 to 2019.

A parallel unrecognized committee, named the Syrian National Olympic Committee, was created in 2016 during the Syrian civil war by the Syrian opposition claiming the legitimacy of Syria's representation at the Olympics, which was not recognized by the IOC.

== List of presidents ==
The following is a list of presidents of the Syrian Olympic Committee and the General Sports Federation since 1982.

President	Term
Samih Moudallal	1982–1995
Nouri Barakat	1995–2002
Kamal Taha	2003–2005
Fayssal Al Bassri	2005–2009
Farouk Bouzo	2009 (Acting)
Mowaffak Joumaa	2010–2020
Feras Mouala	2020–present

== IOC members ==
Member	Term
Samih Moudallal	1998–2019
Samih Moudallal (Honorary member)	2019–present

== See also ==
- Syria at the Olympics
