= Israel at the 1992 Summer Olympics =

- IOC code: ISR
- NOC: Olympic Committee of Israel

in Barcelona
- Competitors: 30 (25 men and 5 women) in 10 sports
- Flag bearer: Eldad Amir
- Medals Ranked 48th: Gold 0 Silver 1 Bronze 1 Total 2

Summer Olympics appearances (overview)
- 1952; 1956; 1960; 1964; 1968; 1972; 1976; 1980; 1984; 1988; 1992; 1996; 2000; 2004; 2008; 2012; 2016; 2020; 2024

Israel competed at the 1992 Summer Olympics in Barcelona, Spain. 30 competitors, 25 men and 5 women, took part in 42 events in 10 sports. Israel won its first ever Olympic medals at these Games. The first medallist in Israel's history was Yael Arad, who won silver on July 30 in judo's under-61 kg category for women, and she was followed a day later by another judoka, Oren Smadja, who won bronze in men's under-71 kg category.

== Medalists ==
Medal	Name	Sport	Event	Date
Silver	Yael Arad	Judo	Women's 61 kg	30 July
Bronze	Oren Smadja	Judo	Men's 71 kg	31 July

== Competitors ==
The following is the list of number of competitors in the Games.

Sport	Men	Women	Total
Athletics	4	0	4
Fencing	0	1	1
Gymnastics	1	0	1
Judo	3	1	4
Sailing	5	0	5
Shooting	2	1	3
Swimming	2	2	4
Tennis	1	0	1
Weightlifting	3	–	3
Wrestling	4	–	4
Total	25	5	30

== Athletics ==
Men
Track and road events

Athlete	Event	Heats		Quarterfinal		Semifinal		Final	
Athlete	Event	Result	Rank	Result	Rank	Result	Rank	Result	Rank
Aleksey Bazarov	400 metres hurdles	50.33	31	—N/a		Did not advance			

Field events

Athlete	Event	Qualification		Final	
Athlete	Event	Distance	Position	Distance	Position
Danny Krasnov	Pole vault	5.60	3 Q	5.40	8
Rogel Nachum	Triple jump	16.23	24	Did not advance	
Vadim Bavikin	Javelin throw	73.88	24	Did not advance	

== Fencing ==
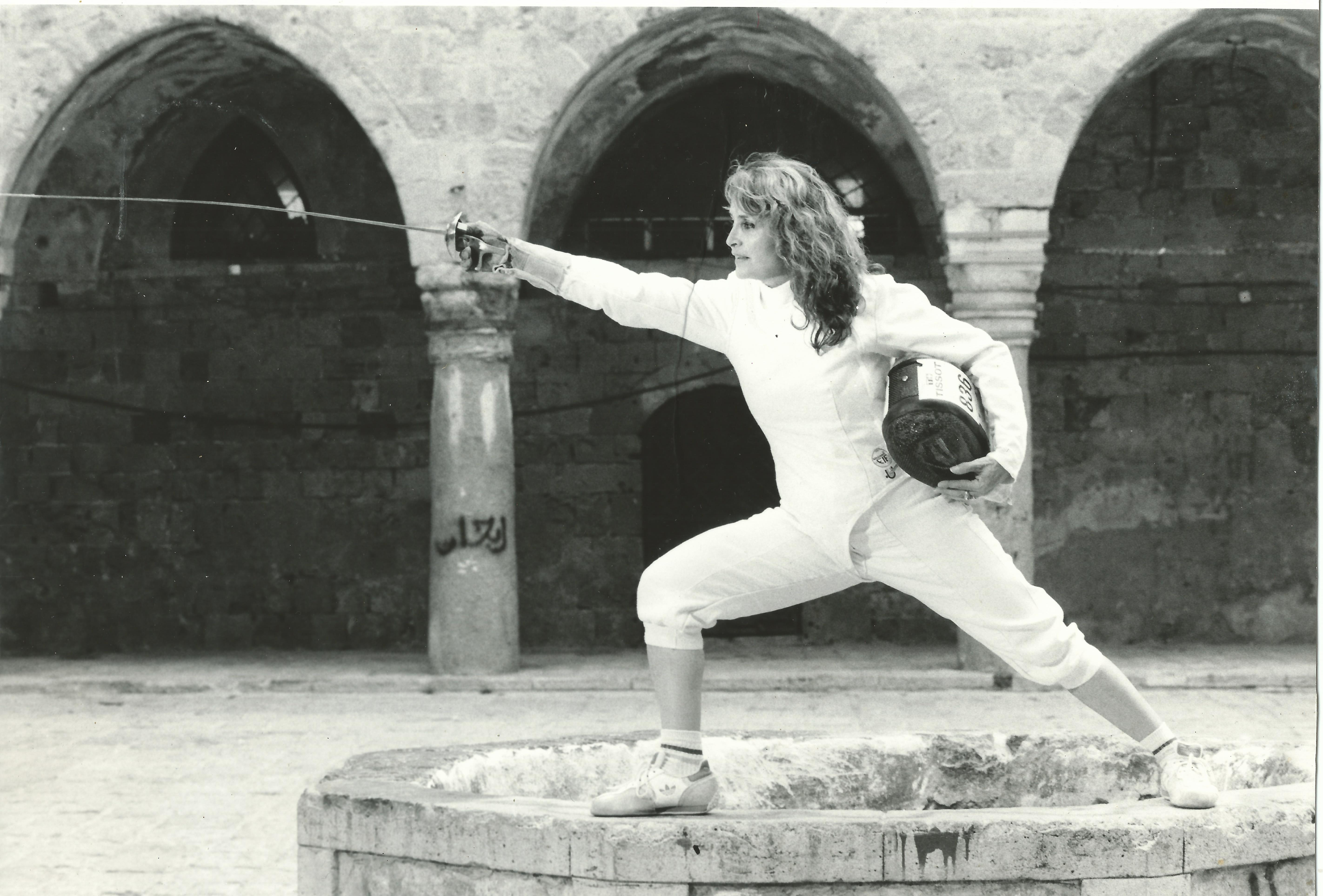
Lydia Hatuel-Zuckerman

Individual
Pool stage

Athlete	Event	Group Stage					
Athlete	Event	Opposition Result	Opposition Result	Opposition Result	Opposition Result	Opposition Result	Rank
Lydia Hatuel-Czuckermann	Women's foil	Xiao (CHN); L 3–5	Mincza (HUN); W 5–3	Dobmeier (GER); W 5–4	Aubin (CAN); W 5–3	McIntosh (GBR); L 4–5	22 Q

Elimination phase

Athlete	Event	Round 1	Round 2	Round 3	Round 4	Repechage				Quarterfinals	Semifinals	Final	
Athlete	Event	Round 1	Round 2	Round 3	Round 4	Round 1	Round 2	Round 3	Round 4	Quarterfinals	Semifinals	Final	
Athlete	Event	Opposition Result	Opposition Result	Opposition Result	Opposition Result	Opposition Result	Opposition Result	Opposition Result	Opposition Result	Opposition Result	Opposition Result	Opposition Result	Rank
Lydia Hatuel-Czuckermann	Women's foil	Bye	Tufan (ROU); L 0–2	Did not advance		Glikina (EUN); W 2–1	Funkenhauser (GER); L 0–2	Did not advance					

== Gymnastics ==
=== Artistic ===
==== Men ====
Individual

Athlete	Event	Qualification							
Athlete	Event	Apparatus						Total	Rank
Athlete	Event	F	PH	R	V	PB	HB	Total	Rank
Ron Kaplan	Individual	19.100	18.650	19.000	18.775	18.625	18.100	112.250	65

== Judo ==
Men

Athlete	Event	Round of 64	Round of 32	Round of 16	Quarterfinals	Semifinals	Repechage				Final	
Athlete	Event	Round of 64	Round of 32	Round of 16	Quarterfinals	Semifinals	Round 1	Round 2	Round 3	Round 4	Final	
Athlete	Event	Opposition Result	Opposition Result	Opposition Result	Opposition Result	Opposition Result	Opposition Result	Opposition Result	Opposition Result	Opposition Result	Opposition Result	Rank
Amit Lang	60 kg	Yoon (KOR); L Chui	Did not advance				García (VEN); L Ippon	Did not advance				
Shay-Oren Smadja	71 kg	Bye	Taher (DJI); W Ippon	Cusack (GBR); W Ippon	Chung (KOR); L Ippon	Did not advance	—N/a		Sulli (ITA); W Ippon	Boldbaatar (MGL); W Ippon	Dott (GER); W Ippon	3rd place, bronze medalist(s)
Simon Magalashvili	95 kg	Bye	Guido (ITA); L Ippon	Did not advance								

Women

Athlete	Event	Round of 32	Round of 16	Quarterfinals	Semifinals	Repechage			Final	
Athlete	Event	Round of 32	Round of 16	Quarterfinals	Semifinals	Round 1	Round 2	Round 3	Final	
Athlete	Event	Opposition Result	Opposition Result	Opposition Result	Opposition Result	Opposition Result	Opposition Result	Opposition Result	Opposition Result	Rank
Yael Arad	61 kg	Bye	Gómez (ESP); W Waza-ari	Jánošíková (TCH); W Waza-ari	Eickhoff (GER); W Ippon	—N/a			Fleury (FRA); L Yusei-gachi	2nd place, silver medalist(s)

== Sailing ==
Men

Athlete	Event	Race										Net points	Final rank
Athlete	Event	1	2	3	4	5	6	7	8	9	10	Net points	Final rank
Amit Inbar	Lechner A-390	10	11.7	11.7	20	~~51~~	5.7	13	8	18	20	118.1	8
Erez Shemesh; Shai Bachar	470	5.7	20	16	20	~~30~~	8	21	—N/a			90.7	9

Open

Athlete	Event	Race							Net points	Final rank
Athlete	Event	1	2	3	4	5	6	7	Net points	Final rank
Eldad Amir; Yoel Sela	Flying Dutchman	22	~~29~~	26	24	19	17	22	130	20

== Shooting ==
Men

Athlete	Event	Qualification		Final	
Athlete	Event	Points	Rank	Points	Rank
Menachem Ilan	50 metre rifle three positions	1132	41	Did not advance	
Menachem Ilan	50 mete rifle prone	590	39	Did not advance	
Eduard Ilyav	10 metre running target	564	15	Did not advance	

Women

Athlete	Event	Qualification		Final	
Athlete	Event	Points	Rank	Points	Rank
Jelena Tripolski	10 metre air pistol	372	37	Did not advance	
Jelena Tripolski	25 metre pistol	573	21	Did not advance	

== Swimming ==
Men

Athlete	Event	Heats		Final A/B	
Athlete	Event	Time	Rank	Time	Rank
Yoav Bruck	50 metre freestyle	23.72	32	Did not advance	
Yoav Bruck	100 metre freestyle	51.46	31	Did not advance	
Eran Groumi	100 metre backstroke	57.67	28	Did not advance	
Eran Groumi	200 metre backstroke	2:07.91	37	Did not advance	
Eran Groumi	100 metre butterfly	55.18	20	Did not advance	

Women

Athlete	Event	Heats		Final A/B	
Athlete	Event	Time	Rank	Time	Rank
Keren Regal	50 metre freestyle	27.93	41	Did not advance	
Keren Regal	200 metre individual medley	2:27.85	37	Did not advance	
Keren Regal	400 metre individual medley	5:07.97	29	Did not advance	
Timea Toth	100 metre butterfly	1:03.18	29	Did not advance	
Timea Toth	200 metre butterfly	2:16.84	20	Did not advance	

== Tennis ==
Men

Athlete	Event	Round of 64	Round of 32	Round of 16	Quarterfinals	Semifinals	Final	
Athlete	Event	Opposition Result	Opposition Result	Opposition Result	Opposition Result	Opposition Result	Opposition Result	Rank
Gilad Bloom	Singles	Vajda (TCH); W (7–6, 6–1, 6–0)	Courier (USA); L (2–6, 0–6, 0–6)	Did not advance				

== Weightlifting ==
Athlete	Event	Snatch		Clean & jerk		Total	Rank
Athlete	Event	Result	Rank	Result	Rank	Total	Rank
Reuven Hadinatov	60 kg	122.5	9	145.0	16	267.5	15
Oleg Sadikov	75 kg	152.5	8	180.0	14	332.5	10
Andrei Denisov	100 kg	175.0	4	202.5	9	377.5	6

== Wrestling ==
Greco-Roman

Athlete	Event	Group Stage							Final	
Athlete	Event	Opposition Result	Opposition Result	Opposition Result	Opposition Result	Opposition Result	Opposition Result	Rank	Opposition Result	Rank
Nik Zagranitchni	48 kg	Elmas (TUR); W 10–8	Fuller (USA); L 1–2	Sánchez (CUB); L 0–4	Did not advance			6	Did not advance	
Alexander Davidovich	62 kg	Martynov (EUN); L 1–8	Nishiguchi (JPN); L 0–2	Did not advance				10	Did not advance	
Matwai Baranov	68 kg	Bye	Stoyanov (BUL); L 0–2	Smith (USA); L Fall	Did not advance			7	Did not advance	

Freestyle

Athlete	Event	Group Stage						Final	
Athlete	Event	Opposition Result	Opposition Result	Opposition Result	Opposition Result	Opposition Result	Rank	Opposition Result	Rank
Max Geller	68 kg	Rodríguez (CUB); W 2–1	Özbaş (TUR); L 0–2	Elekes (HUN); L DQ	Did not advance		7	Did not advance	
