= Wrestling at the 1992 Summer Olympics – Men's Greco-Roman 48 kg =

Men's Greco-Roman 48 kg at the Games of the XXV Olympiad
- Venue: Institut Nacional d'Educació Física de Catalunya
- Dates: 27–29 July 1992
- Competitors: 19 from 19 nations

Medalists
1st place, gold medalist(s)		Oleg Kucherenko	Unified Team
2nd place, silver medalist(s)		Vincenzo Maenza	Italy
3rd place, bronze medalist(s)		Wilber Sánchez	Cuba

The men's Greco-Roman 48 kilograms at the 1992 Summer Olympics as part of the wrestling program were held at the Institut Nacional d'Educació Física de Catalunya from July 27 to July 29. The wrestlers were divided into 2 groups and the winner of each group was decided by a double-elimination system.

== Results ==
Legend

- WO — Won by walkover

=== Elimination A ===
==== Round 1 ====
	Score		CP
Ömer Elmas (TUR)	8–10	Nik Zagranitchni (ISR)	1–3 PP
Wilber Sánchez (CUB)	3–0	Mark Fuller (USA)	3–0 PO
Iliuţă Dăscălescu (ROM)	4–2	Goun Duk-yong (KOR)	3–1 PP
Abdelmalek El-Aouad (MAR)	0–15	Masanori Ohashi (JPN)	0–4 ST
Oleg Kucherenko (EUN)	6–1	Lars Rønningen (NOR)	3–1 PP

==== Round 2 ====
	Score		CP
Ömer Elmas (TUR)	0–3	Wilber Sánchez (CUB)	0–3 PO
Nik Zagranitchni (ISR)	1–2	Mark Fuller (USA)	1–3 PP
Iliuţă Dăscălescu (ROM)	6–0 Fall	Abdelmalek El-Aouad (MAR)	4–0 TO
Goun Duk-yong (KOR)	0–3	Oleg Kucherenko (EUN)	0–3 PO
Masanori Ohashi (JPN)	0–2	Lars Rønningen (NOR)	0–3 PO

==== Round 3 ====
	Score		CP
Nik Zagranitchni (ISR)	0–4	Wilber Sánchez (CUB)	0–3 PO
Mark Fuller (USA)	3–4 Fall	Iliuţă Dăscălescu (ROM)	0–4 TO
Masanori Ohashi (JPN)	2–7	Oleg Kucherenko (EUN)	1–3 PP
Lars Rønningen (NOR)		Bye	

==== Round 4 ====
	Score		CP
Lars Rønningen (NOR)	1–2	Wilber Sánchez (CUB)	1–3 PP
Iliuţă Dăscălescu (ROM)	1–10	Oleg Kucherenko (EUN)	1–3 PP

==== Round 5 ====
	Score		CP
Wilber Sánchez (CUB)	2–2	Iliuţă Dăscălescu (ROM)	3–1 PP
Oleg Kucherenko (EUN)		Bye	

==== Round 6 ====
	Score		CP
Oleg Kucherenko (EUN)	11–0	Wilber Sánchez (CUB)	3–0 PO
Iliuţă Dăscălescu (ROM)		Bye	

==== Summary ====
Pos	Athlete	Pld	W	L	R	CP	TP
1	Oleg Kucherenko (EUN)	5	5	0	X (Note: Classification points: EUN 6, CUB 3, ROM 2)	15	37
2	Wilber Sánchez (CUB)	6	5	1	X	15	14
3	Iliuţă Dăscălescu (ROM)	5	3	2	X	13	17
4	Lars Rønningen (NOR)	3	1	2	4	5	4
5	Masanori Ohashi (JPN)	3	1	2	3	5	17
—	Nik Zagranitchni (ISR)	3	1	2	3	4	11
—	Mark Fuller (USA)	3	1	2	3	3	5
—	Ömer Elmas (TUR)	2	0	2	2	1	8
—	Goun Duk-yong (KOR)	2	0	2	2	1	2
—	Abdelmalek El-Aouad (MAR)	2	0	2	2	0	0

Source: Official Report

=== Elimination B ===
==== Round 1 ====
	Score		CP
Pappu Yadav (IND)	19–3	József Faragó (HUN)	4–0 ST
Reza Simkhah (IRI)	7–5	Nuran Pelikyan (BUL)	3–1 PP
Fuat Yıldız (GER)	9–2	Mynor Ramírez (GUA)	3–1 PP
Jiang Wei (CHN)	1–11	Vincenzo Maenza (ITA)	1–3 PP
Mohammad Hassoun (SYR)		Bye	

==== Round 2 ====
	Score		CP
Mohammad Hassoun (SYR)	2–5	Pappu Yadav (IND)	1–3 PP
József Faragó (HUN)	1–12	Reza Simkhah (IRI)	1–3 PP
Nuran Pelikyan (BUL)	1–3	Fuat Yıldız (GER)	1–3 PP
Mynor Ramírez (GUA)	0–16	Jiang Wei (CHN)	0–4 ST
Vincenzo Maenza (ITA)		Bye	

==== Round 3 ====
	Score		CP
Vincenzo Maenza (ITA)	15–0	Mohammad Hassoun (SYR)	4–0 ST
Pappu Yadav (IND)	1–11	Reza Simkhah (IRI)	1–3 PP
Fuat Yıldız (GER)	3–0	Jiang Wei (CHN)	3–0 PO

==== Round 4 ====
	Score		CP
Vincenzo Maenza (ITA)	15–0	Pappu Yadav (IND)	4–0 ST
Reza Simkhah (IRI)	3–0	Fuat Yıldız (GER)	3–0 PO

==== Round 5 ====
	Score		CP
Vincenzo Maenza (ITA)	13–0	Fuat Yıldız (GER)	3.5–0 SO

- Reza Simkhah (IRI) was disqualified for failing to make weight before the fifth round.

==== Summary ====
Pos	Athlete	Pld	W	L	R	CP	TP
1	Vincenzo Maenza (ITA)	4	4	0	X (Note: ITA 3.5–0 GER)	14.5	54
2	Fuat Yıldız (GER)	5	3	2	X	9	15
3	Reza Simkhah (IRI)	4	4	0	4	12	33
4	Pappu Yadav (IND)	4	2	2	4	8	25
—	Jiang Wei (CHN)	3	1	2	3	5	17
5	Mohammad Hassoun (SYR)	2	0	2	3	1	2
—	Nuran Pelikyan (BUL)	2	0	2	2	2	6
—	József Faragó (HUN)	2	0	2	2	1	4
—	Mynor Ramírez (GUA)	2	0	2	2	1	2

Source: Official Report

=== Finals ===
	Score		CP
9th place match
Masanori Ohashi (JPN)	WO	Mohammad Hassoun (SYR)	4–0 EF
7th place match
Lars Rønningen (NOR)	WO	Pappu Yadav (IND)	
5th place match
Iliuţă Dăscălescu (ROM)	WO	Reza Simkhah (IRI)	
Bronze medal match
Wilber Sánchez (CUB)	5–0	Fuat Yıldız (GER)	3–0 PO
Gold medal match
Oleg Kucherenko (EUN)	3–0	Vincenzo Maenza (ITA)	3–0 PO

== Final standing ==
Rank	Athlete
1st place, gold medalist(s)	Oleg Kucherenko (EUN)
2nd place, silver medalist(s)	Vincenzo Maenza (ITA)
3rd place, bronze medalist(s)	Wilber Sánchez (CUB)
4	Fuat Yıldız (GER)
5	Iliuţă Dăscălescu (ROM)
6	Reza Simkhah (IRI)
7	Lars Rønningen (NOR)
8	Pappu Yadav (IND)
9	Masanori Ohashi (JPN)
10	Nuran Pelikyan (BUL)
