= Wrestling at the 1988 Summer Olympics – Men's Greco-Roman 48 kg =

Men's Greco-Roman 48 kg at the Games of the XXIV Olympiad
- Venue: Sangmu Gymnasium
- Dates: 18–20 September 1988
- Competitors: 15 from 15 nations

Medalists
1st place, gold medalist(s)		Vincenzo Maenza	Italy
2nd place, silver medalist(s)		Andrzej Głąb	Poland
3rd place, bronze medalist(s)		Bratan Tsenov	Bulgaria

The Men's Greco-Roman 48 kg at the 1988 Summer Olympics as part of the wrestling program were held at the Sangmu Gymnasium, Seongnam.

Abullah Alizani from the Yemen Arab Republic lost to Israeli Dov Groverman in the first round. Alizani was slated to wrestle the Israeli, but failed to show up for his match even after he was paged three times, in what an Israeli official called a political snub, and Alizani was declared the loser of the Men's Light-Flyweight (48 kg), Greco-Roman match by the referee.

== Medalists ==
Gold	Vincenzo Maenza; Italy
Silver	Andrzej Głąb; Poland
Bronze	Bratan Tsenov; Bulgaria

== Tournament results ==
The wrestlers are divided into 2 groups. The winner of each group decided by a double-elimination system.

Legend

- TF — Won by Fall
- SP — Won by Superiority, 12-14 points difference, the loser with points
- SO — Won by Superiority, 12-14 points difference, the loser without points
- ST — Won by Technical Superiority, 15 points difference
- PP — Won by Points, the loser with technical points
- PO — Won by Points, the loser without technical points
- P0 — Won by Passivity, scoring zero points
- P1 — Won by Passivity, while leading by 1-11 points
- PS — Won by Passivity, while leading by 12-14 points
- PA — Won by Opponent Injury
- DQ — Won by Forfeit
- DNA — Did not appear
- L — Losses
- ER — Round of Elimination
- CP — Classification Points
- TP — Technical Points

=== Eliminatory round ===
==== Group A ====
L		CP	TP		L
Round 1
1	Ikuzo Saito (JPN)	1-3 PP	1-3	Mark Fuller (USA)	0
0	Vincenzo Maenza (ITA)	3-0 PO	11-0	Lars Rønningen (NOR)	1
0	Markus Scherer (FRG)	3-1 PP	10-5	Reza Simkhah (IRI)	1
0	Bratan Tsenov (BUL)	3.5-0 PS	2:10	Yang Zhizhong (CHN)	1
Round 2
2	Ikuzo Saito (JPN)	1-3 PP	1-9	Vincenzo Maenza (ITA)	0
1	Mark Fuller (USA)	1-3 PP	4-6	Lars Rønningen (NOR)	1
1	Markus Scherer (FRG)	.5-3.5 SP	3-15	Bratan Tsenov (BUL)	0
2	Reza Simkhah (IRI)	0-4 ST	0-16	Yang Zhizhong (CHN)	1
Round 3
2	Mark Fuller (USA)	1-3 PP	4-7	Vincenzo Maenza (ITA)	0
2	Lars Rønningen (NOR)	.5-3.5 SP	4-16	Bratan Tsenov (BUL)	0
1	Markus Scherer (FRG)	3-1 PP	13-4	Yang Zhizhong (CHN)	2
Round 4
0	Vincenzo Maenza (ITA)	3.5-.5 SP	15-1	Markus Scherer (FRG)	2
0	Bratan Tsenov (BUL)			Bye	
Round 5
1	Bratan Tsenov (BUL)	1-3 PP	3-4	Vincenzo Maenza (ITA)	0

Wrestler	L	ER	CP
Vincenzo Maenza (ITA)	0	-	15.5
Bratan Tsenov (BUL)	1	-	11.5
Markus Scherer (FRG)	2	4	7
Yang Zhizhong (CHN)	2	3	5
Mark Fuller (USA)	2	3	5
Lars Rønningen (NOR)	2	3	3.5
Ikuzo Saito (JPN)	2	2	2
Reza Simkhah (IRI)	2	2	1

==== Group B ====
L		CP	TP		L
Round 1
0	Andrzej Głąb (POL)	3-1 PP	10-5	Mahaddin Allahverdiyev (URS)	1
0	Dov Groverman (ISR)	4-0 DQ		Abdallah Al-Izani (YAR)	1
0	Khaled Al-Faraj (SYR)	4-0 TF	5:11	Víctor Capacho (COL)	1
0	Goun Duk-yong (KOR)	3-0 PO	1-0	József Faragó (HUN)	1
Round 2
0	Andrzej Głąb (POL)	3-1 PP	16-7	Dov Groverman (ISR)	1
1	Mahaddin Allahverdiyev (URS)	3.5-.5 SP	16-4	Khaled Al-Faraj (SYR)	1
2	Víctor Capacho (COL)	1-3 PP	1-2	Goun Duk-yong (KOR)	0
1	József Faragó (HUN)			Bye	
1	Abdallah Al-Izani (YAR)			DNA	
Round 3
2	József Faragó (HUN)	0-3 P1	5:49	Andrzej Głąb (POL)	0
1	Mahaddin Allahverdiyev (URS)	3-1 PP	7-1	Dov Groverman (ISR)	2
1	Khaled Al-Faraj (SYR)	3-1 PP	8-5	Goun Duk-yong (KOR)	1
Round 4
0	Andrzej Głąb (POL)	3-1 PP	10-5	Khaled Al-Faraj (SYR)	2
1	Mahaddin Allahverdiyev (URS)	3-1 PP	2-1	Goun Duk-yong (KOR)	2

Wrestler	L	ER	CP
Andrzej Głąb (POL)	0	-	12
Mahaddin Allahverdiyev (URS)	1	-	10.5
Khaled Al-Faraj (SYR)	2	4	8.5
Goun Duk-yong (KOR)	2	4	8
Dov Groverman (ISR)	2	3	6
József Faragó (HUN)	2	3	0
Víctor Capacho (COL)	2	2	1
Abdallah Al-Izani (YAR)	1	1	0

=== Final round ===
	CP	TP	
7th place match
Yang Zhizhong (CHN)	4-0 PA		Goun Duk-Yong (KOR)
5th place match
Markus Scherer (FRG)	1-3 PP	6-16	Khaled Al-Faraj (SYR)
Bronze medal match
Bratan Tsenov (BUL)	3-0 P1	7:28	Mahaddin Allahverdiyev (URS)
Gold medal match
Vincenzo Maenza (ITA)	3-0 PO	3-0	Andrzej Głąb (POL)

== Final standings ==
1. Vincenzo Maenza (ITA)
2. Andrzej Głąb (POL)
3. Bratan Tsenov (BUL)
4. Mahaddin Allahverdiyev (URS)
5. Khaled Al-Faraj (SYR)
6. Markus Scherer (FRG)
7. Yang Zhizhong (CHN)
8. Goun Duk-Yong (KOR)
