= Wrestling at the 1984 Summer Olympics – Men's Greco-Roman 48 kg =

Men's Greco-Roman 48 kg at the Games of the XXIII Olympiad
- Venue: Anaheim Convention Center
- Dates: 30 July–1 August 1984
- Competitors: 12 from 12 nations

Medalists
1st place, gold medalist(s)		Vincenzo Maenza	Italy
2nd place, silver medalist(s)		Markus Scherer	West Germany
3rd place, bronze medalist(s)		Ikuzo Saito	Japan

The Men's Greco-Roman 48 kg at the 1984 Summer Olympics as part of the wrestling program were held at the Anaheim Convention Center, Anaheim, California.

== Medalists ==
Gold	Vincenzo Maenza; Italy
Silver	Markus Scherer; West Germany
Bronze	Ikuzo Saito; Japan

== Tournament results ==
The wrestlers are divided into 2 groups. The winner of each group decided by a double-elimination system.

Legend

- TF — Won by Fall
- ST — Won by Technical Superiority, 12 points difference
- PP — Won by Points, 1-7 points difference, the loser with points
- PO — Won by Points, 1-7 points difference, the loser without points
- SP — Won by Points, 8-11 points difference, the loser with points
- SO — Won by Points, 8-11 points difference, the loser without points
- P0 — Won by Passivity, scoring zero points
- P1 — Won by Passivity, while leading by 1-7 points
- PS — Won by Passivity, while leading by 8-11 points
- DC — Won by Decision, 0-0 score
- PA — Won by Opponent Injury
- DQ — Won by Forfeit
- DNA — Did not appear
- L — Losses
- ER — Round of Elimination
- CP — Classification Points
- TP — Technical Points

=== Eliminatory round ===
==== Group A ====
L		CP	TP		L
Round 1
1	Mark Fuller (USA)	1-3 PP	7-8	Li Haisheng (CHN)	0
1	Salih Bora (TUR)	0-3 PO	0-3	Vincenzo Maenza (ITA)	0
0	Kent Andersson (SWE)	4-0 ST	12-0	Jukka-Pekka Tanner (FIN)	1
Round 2
2	Mark Fuller (USA)	1-3 PP	2-6	Salih Bora (TUR)	1
1	Li Haisheng (CHN)	0-4 ST	0-13	Vincenzo Maenza (ITA)	0
0	Kent Andersson (SWE)			Bye	
1	Jukka-Pekka Tanner (FIN)			DNA	
Round 3
1	Kent Andersson (SWE)	0-3 PO	0-3	Vincenzo Maenza (ITA)	0
2	Li Haisheng (CHN)	1-3 PP	2-5	Salih Bora (TUR)	1
Final
	Salih Bora (TUR)	0-3 PO	0-3	Vincenzo Maenza (ITA)	
	Kent Andersson (SWE)	0-3 PO	0-3	Vincenzo Maenza (ITA)	
	Kent Andersson (SWE)	.5-3.5 SP	2-11	Salih Bora (TUR)	

Wrestler	L	ER	CP	Final
Vincenzo Maenza (ITA)	0	-	10	6
Salih Bora (TUR)	1	-	6	3.5
Kent Andersson (SWE)	1	-	4	0.5
Li Haisheng (CHN)	2	3	4	
Mark Fuller (USA)	2	2	2	
Jukka-Pekka Tanner (FIN)	1	1	0	

==== Group B ====
L		CP	TP		L
Round 1
1	Lars Rønningen (NOR)	.5-3.5 SP	4-14	Markus Scherer (FRG)	0
0	Ikuzo Saito (JPN)	4-0 ST	12-0	Gustavo Delgado (MEX)	1
0	Jun Dae-Je (KOR)	4-0 TF	1:05	Abdel Malek El-Aouad (MAR)	1
Round 2
2	Lars Rønningen (NOR)	0-4 ST	2-14	Ikuzo Saito (JPN)	0
0	Markus Scherer (FRG)	4-0 ST	12-0	Gustavo Delgado (MEX)	2
0	Jun Dae-Je (KOR)			Bye	
1	Abdelmalek El-Aouad (MAR)			DNA	
Final
	Jun Dae-Je (KOR)	1-3 PP	18-24	Markus Scherer (FRG)	
	Ikuzo Saito (JPN)	3-1 PP	15-13	Jun Dae-Je (KOR)	
	Markus Scherer (FRG)	3.5-.5 SP	18-7	Ikuzo Saito (JPN)	

Wrestler	L	ER	CP	Final
Markus Scherer (FRG)	0	-	7.5	6.5
Ikuzo Saito (JPN)	0	-	8	3.5
Jun Dae-Je (KOR)	0	-	4	2
Lars Rønningen (NOR)	2	2	0.5	
Gustavo Delgado (MEX)	2	2	0	
Abdelmalek El-Aouad (MAR)	1	1	0	

=== Final round ===
	CP	TP	
5th place match
Kent Andersson (SWE)	3-1 PP	10-3	Jun Dae-Je (KOR)
Bronze medal match
Salih Bora (TUR)	1-3 PP	5-7	Ikuzo Saito (JPN)
Gold medal match
Vincenzo Maenza (ITA)	4-0 ST	12-0	Markus Scherer (FRG)

== Final standings ==
1. Vincenzo Maenza (ITA)
2. Markus Scherer (FRG)
3. Ikuzo Saito (JPN)
4. Salih Bora (TUR)
5. Kent Andersson (SWE)
6. Jun Dae-Je (KOR)
7. Li Haisheng (CHN)
8. Mark Fuller (USA)
