= Vincenzo Maenza =

Italian wrestler (born 1962)

Personal information
- Born: 2 May 1962 (age 64) Imola, Italy
- Height: 1.60 m (5 ft 3 in)
- Weight: 48 kg (106 lb)

Sport
- Sport: Wrestling
- Event: Greco-Roman
- Club: CISA Faenza
Medal record
Men's Greco-Roman wrestling
Representing Italy
Olympic Games
| Gold medal – first place | 1984 Los Angeles | 48 kg |
| Gold medal – first place | 1988 Seoul | 48 kg |
| Silver medal – second place | 1992 Barcelona | 48 kg |
World Championships
| Silver medal – second place | 1987 Clermont-Ferrand | 48 kg |
European Championships
| Silver medal – second place | 1984 Jönköping | 48 kg |
| Bronze medal – third place | 1986 Piraeus | 48 kg |
| Gold medal – first place | 1987 Tampere | 48 kg |

Vincenzo Maenza (born 2 May 1962) is an Italian Greco-Roman wrestler. He won two gold medals and a silver medal at the 1984, 1988, and 1992 Olympic Games.

== Career ==
Nicknamed "Pollicino" (Thumbelin) for his small size, Vincenzo Maenza is considered the best wrestler in the Italian history. In fact, he is the first and only Italian wrestler who has won three Olympic medals, and he was also the first and only who was able to win two gold medals.

When was a child, Vincenzo weighed only 60 lbs and was affected by scoliosis. He started to wrestle at 12 years old at the CISA AUDAX wrestling club in Faenza.

He began to compete in 1976. Soon he became National Champion several times and in 1979 won the silver medal at the Mediterranean Games in Split. The next year he competed in the Summer Olympics in Moscow and placed 7th. After he won the bronze medal at Junior European Championship and the gold medal at the Junior World Championship, in 1984 Vincenzo became Olympic champion for the first time at the 1984 Summer Olympics in Los Angeles. In the final, he defeated German wrestler Markus Scherer in 1:59 with an awesome 12-0 score.

The 1987 was a golden year for the Italian wrestler. He became European Champion and silver medalist at World Championship. A year later, at the 1988 Summer Olympics in Seoul, Vincenzo won the gold medal for the second time, after defeated the strong Bulgarian wrestler Bratan Tsenov in the semifinal match and Andrzej Głąb of Poland in the final match. In 1992, at the 1992 Summer Olympics in Barcelona, he arrived at the final match and won the silver medal, after was defeated by the Soviet wrestler Oleg Kutscherenko, who was ten years younger than he.

At the end of his career, Vincenzo Maenza's awards included: 3 Olympic Medals (two golds and one silver), 1 time European champion and 2 times bronze medalist, 1 time silver medalist and 2 times bronze medalist at the World Championships, 2 times gold medalist and 1 time bronze medalist at the Mediterranean Games.

In 2005, Vincenzo Maenza was inducted in the FILA International Wrestling Hall Of Fame.

Today, Vincenzo lives in Faenza with his family.

== Athletic achievements ==
- 1978 - 2nd at MEC Tournament in the Netherlands
- 1979 - Mediterranean Games (Split) silver medalist
- 1981 - European Championship (Bursa) bronze medalist
- 1982 - World Championship (Caracas) gold medalist
- 1983 - Mediterranean Games (Casablanca) gold medalist
- 1984 - Summer Olympic Games (Los Angeles) gold medalist
- 1984 - 1st at CEE Athens Cup
- 1984 - European Championship (Sweden) bronze medalist
- 1985 - World Super Championship (Tokyo) gold medalist
- 1986 - European Championship (Athens) bronze medalist
- 1987 - European Championship (Tampere) gold medalist
- 1987 - Mediterranean Games (Syria) gold medalist
- 1987 - World Championship (France) silver medalist
- 1988 - Summer Olympic Games (Seoul) gold medalist
- 1989 - 2nd at World Festival (Colorado)
- 1991 - Mediterranean Games bronze medalist
- 1992 - Summer Olympic Games (Barcelona) silver medalist

Medal of Honor and Sport Merit

== Quotes ==
He said about wrestling:

...because all the other sports, like soccer, are played for pleasure. Wrestling not. Or love it, or hate it. Wrestling needs a superhuman conviction to do well and succeed. Of motivations that are inside you[...] it's your challenge against your disquiet, against your nightmares, against your inside enemy.

== Trivia ==
- Vincenzo loves music; his favourite singers are Edoardo Bennato and Barbra Streisand.
- He likes Sylvester Stallone's films.
- His favourite football team is Juventus FC
- He likes to read comic books.
