= Judo at the 1992 Summer Olympics – Men's 71 kg =

Judo at the Olympics

Men's 71 kg at the Games of the XXV Olympiad
- Venue: Palau Blaugrana
- Date: 31 July 1992
- Competitors: 44 from 44 nations

Medalists
1st place, gold medalist(s)		Toshihiko Koga	Japan
2nd place, silver medalist(s)		Bertalan Hajtós	Hungary
3rd place, bronze medalist(s)		Chung Hoon	South Korea
3rd place, bronze medalist(s)		Oren Smadja	Israel

The men's 71 kg competition in judo at the 1992 Summer Olympics in Barcelona was held on 31 July at the Palau Blaugrana. The gold medal was won by Toshihiko Koga of Japan.

== Results ==
=== Main brackets ===
==== Pool A ====
Round of 64
Josef Vensek (TCH)	YUS
Mario González (MEX)	E
Edgardo Antinori (ARG)	E
Norbert Haimberger (AUT)	IPO
Lusambu Mafuta (COD)	IPO
José Maria de Jesús (ANG)	E
Juan Vargas (ESA)	IPO
Mohamed Al-Jalai (YEM)	E
Shi Chengsheng (CHN)	IPO
Luc Rasoanaivo-Razafy (MAD)	E
Park Yong-i (PRK)	IPO
Mike Swain (USA)	E

Round of 32
Josef Vensek (TCH)	WIP
Wahid Yudhi Sulistianto (INA)	E
Norbert Haimberger (AUT)	E
Jorma Korhonen (FIN)	YUS
Lusambu Mafuta (COD)	RA
Stefan Dott (GER)	IPO
Bruno Carabetta (FRA)	IPO
Alpaslan Ayan (TUR)	E
Juan Vargas (ESA)	RA
Toshihiko Koga (JPN)	IPO
Shi Chengsheng (CHN)	WAZ
Rui Domingues (POR)	E
Park Yong-i (PRK)	IPO
Laurent Pellet (SUI)	E
Wieslaw Blach (POL)	WIP
Ignacio Sayu (CUB)	E

Round of 16
Josef Vensek (TCH)	E
Jorma Korhonen (FIN)	WAZ
Stefan Dott (GER)	YUS
Bruno Carabetta (FRA)	RA
Toshihiko Koga (JPN)	WAZ
Shi Chengsheng (CHN)	RA
Park Yong-i (PRK)	E
Wieslaw Blach (POL)	IPO

Quarterfinal
Jorma Korhonen (FIN)	RA
Stefan Dott (GER)	'YUS
Toshihiko Koga (JPN)	YUS
Wieslaw Blach (POL)	RA

Semifinal
Stefan Dott (GER)	RB
Toshihiko Koga (JPN)	IPO

==== Pool B ====
Round of 64
Joaquín Ruiz (ESP)	YUS
Sérgio Oliveira (BRA)	E
Awad Mahmoud (SUD)	E
Meziane Dahmani (ALG)	IPO
Khaliuny Boldbaatar (MGL)	WAZ
Magomedbek Aliyev (EUN)	E
Chung Hoon (KOR)	IPO
Malick Seck (SEN)	RB
Massimo Sulli (ITA)	IPO
Majemite Omagbaluwaje (NGR)	E
Anders Dahlin (SWE)	E
Billy Cusack (GBR)	YUK

Round of 32
Joaquín Ruiz (ESP)	HAN
Miroslav Jočić (IOA)	E
Meziane Dahmani (ALG)	IPO
Jason Trevisan (MLT)	E
Khaliuny Boldbaatar (MGL)	IPO
Siméon Toronlo (CAF)	E
Bertalan Hajtós (HUN)	IPO
Roman Hatashita (CAN)	RB
Chung Hoon (KOR)	IPO
Steve Corkin (NZL)	RB
Massimo Sulli (ITA)	IPO
Rubens Joseph (HAI)	E
Billy Cusack (GBR)	IPO
Hady Kahy (LIB)	E
Oren Smadja (ISR)	IPO
Alaoui Mohamed Taher (DJI)	E

Round of 16
Joaquín Ruiz (ESP)	E
Meziane Dahmani (ALG)	IPO
Khaliuny Boldbaatar (MGL)	RB
Bertalan Hajtós (HUN)	IPO
Chung Hoon (KOR)	KOK
Massimo Sulli (ITA)	RB
Billy Cusack (GBR)	E
Oren Smadja (ISR)	IPO

Quarterfinal
Meziane Dahmani (ALG)	RB
Bertalan Hajtós (HUN)	IPO
Chung Hoon (KOR)	IPO
Oren Smadja (ISR)	RB

Semifinal
Bertalan Hajtós (HUN)	IPO
Chung Hoon (KOR)	RB

=== Repechages ===
==== Repechage A ====
Repechage round 1

Repechage round 2
Lusambu Mafuta (COD)
Bruno Carabetta (FRA)	IPO
Juan Vargas (ESA)	E
Shi Chengsheng (CHN)	IPO

Repechage quarterfinal
Bruno Carabetta (FRA)	IPO
Jorma Korhonen (FIN)	E
Shi Chengsheng (CHN)	E
Wieslaw Blach (POL)	YUS

Repechage semifinal
Bruno Carabetta (FRA)	WAZ
Wieslaw Blach (POL)	E

Repechage final
Bruno Carabetta (FRA)	E
Chung Hoon (KOR)	YUS (bronze)

==== Repechage B ====
Repechage round 1
Malick Seck (SEN)	KOK
Steve Corkin (NZL)	E

Repechage round 2
Roman Hatashita (CAN)	E
Khaliuny Boldbaatar (MGL)	IPO
Malick Seck (SEN)	E
Massimo Sulli (ITA)	IPO

Repechage quarterfinal
Khaliuny Boldbaatar (MGL)	WAZ
Meziane Dahmani (ALG)	E
Massimo Sulli (ITA)	E
Oren Smadja (ISR)	IPO

Repechage semifinal
Khaliuny Boldbaatar (MGL)	E
Oren Smadja (ISR)	IPO

Repechage final
Oren Smadja (ISR)	IPO (bronze)
Stefan Dott (GER)	E

=== Final ===
Final
Toshihiko Koga (JPN)	YUS (gold)
Bertalan Hajtós (HUN)	2nd place, silver medalist(s)

== Final classification ==
Rank	Judoka	Nation
1st place, gold medalist(s)	Toshihiko Koga	Japan
2nd place, silver medalist(s)	Bertalan Hajtós	Hungary
3rd place, bronze medalist(s)	Chung Hoon	South Korea
3rd place, bronze medalist(s)	Oren Smadja	Israel
5T	Bruno Carabetta	France
5T	Stefan Dott	Germany
7T	Wieslaw Blach	Poland
7T	Khaliuny Boldbaatar	Mongolia
9T	Jorma Korhonen	Finland
9T	Shi Chengsheng	China
9T	Meziane Dahmani	Algeria
9T	Massimo Sulli	Italy
13T	Lusambu Mafuta	Zaire
13T	Juan Vargas	El Salvador
13T	Roman Hatashita	Canada
13T	Malick Seck	Senegal
17T	Steve Corkin	New Zealand
18T	Josef Vensek	Czechoslovakia
18T	Park Yong-i	North Korea
18T	Billy Cusack	Great Britain
18T	Joaquín Ruiz	Spain
22T	Wahid Yudhi Sulistianto	Indonesia
22T	Norbert Haimberger	Austria
22T	Laurent Pellet	Switzerland
22T	Alpaslan Ayan	Turkey
22T	Ignacio Sayu	Cuba
22T	Rui Domingues	Portugal
22T	Miroslav Jočić	Independent Olympic Participants
22T	Jason Trevisan	Malta
22T	Siméon Toronlo	Central African Republic
22T	Hady Kahy	Lebanon
22T	Alaoui Mohamed Taher	Djibouti
22T	Rubens Joseph	Haiti
34T	Mario González	Mexico
34T	Edgardo Antinori	Argentina
34T	José Maria de Jesús	Angola
34T	Mohamed Al-Jalai	Yemen
34T	Luc Rasoanaivo-Razafy	Madagascar
34T	Sérgio Oliveira	Brazil
34T	Awad Mahmoud	Sudan
34T	Magomedbek Aliyev	Unified Team
34T	Majemite Omagbaluwaje	Nigeria
34T	Anders Dahlin	Sweden
34T	Mike Swain	United States
