= 1990 European Wrestling Championships =

Iam Anil Soni

- Host city: Poznań, Poland
- Dates: 1–8 May 1990

Champions
- Freestyle: Soviet Union
- Greco-Roman: Soviet Union

The 1990 European Wrestling Championships were held in Poznań on 1–8 May 1990.

== Medal table ==
Rank	Nation	Gold	Silver	Bronze	Total
1	Soviet Union	9	4	3	16
2	West Germany	2	2	2	6
3	East Germany	2	2	0	4
4	Bulgaria	1	3	5	9
5	Romania	1	3	1	5
6	Turkey	1	0	3	4
7	France	1	0	1	2
8	Norway	1	0	0	1
8	Sweden	1	0	0	1
8	Yugoslavia	1	0	0	1
11	Hungary	0	3	2	5
12	Poland	0	2	2	4
13	Finland	0	1	0	1
14	Czechoslovakia	0	0	1	1
Totals (14 entries)		20	20	20	60

== Medal summary ==
=== Men's freestyle ===
Event	Gold	Silver	Bronze
48 kg	Romica Rașovan; Romania	Marian Avramov; Bulgaria	Reiner Heugabel; West Germany
52 kg	Shaban Tërstena; Yugoslavia	Vladimir Toguzov; Soviet Union	Ivan Tsonov; Bulgaria
57 kg	Rumen Pavlov; Bulgaria	Laszlo Miklosch; West Germany	Ali Alisultanov; Soviet Union
62 kg	Ralf Lyding; West Germany	Karsten Polky; East Germany	Rosen Vasilev; Bulgaria
68 kg	Fevzi Şeker; Turkey	Georg Schwabenland; West Germany	Abdula Magomedov; Soviet Union
74 kg	Nasir Gadžihanov; Soviet Union	Claudiu Tămăduianu; Romania	Valentin Zhelev; Bulgaria
82 kg	Hans Gstöttner; East Germany	Elmadi Zhabrailov; Soviet Union	Sebahattin Öztürk; Turkey
90 kg	Vagab Kazibekov; Soviet Union	Gábor Tóth; Hungary	Kenan Şimşek; Turkey
100 kg	Arawat Sabejew; Soviet Union	Andrzej Radomski; Poland	Mahmut Demir; Turkey
130 kg	Andreas Schröder; East Germany	Kiril Barbutov; Bulgaria	Andrey Shumilin; Soviet Union

=== Men's Greco-Roman ===
Event	Gold	Silver	Bronze
48 kg	Sergey Suvorov; Soviet Union	Iliuţă Dăscălescu; Romania	József Faragó; Hungary
52 kg	Jon Rønningen; Norway	Oleg Kutscherenko; Soviet Union	Valentin Krumov; Bulgaria
57 kg	Patrice Mourier; France	András Sike; Hungary	Rıfat Yıldız; West Germany
62 kg	Guennadi Atmakin; Soviet Union	Jenő Bódi; Hungary	Ryszard Wolny; Poland
68 kg	Islam Dugushiev; Soviet Union	Petrică Cărare; Romania	Ghani Yalouz; France
74 kg	Torbjörn Kornbakk; Sweden	Tuomo Karila; Finland	Jaroslav Zeman; Czechoslovakia
82 kg	Thomas Zander; West Germany	Sergey Nasevich; Soviet Union	Todor Anguelov; Bulgaria
90 kg	Pavel Potapov; Soviet Union	Marek Kraszewski; Poland	Tibor Komáromi; Hungary
100 kg	Anatol Fedarenka; Soviet Union	Maik Bullmann; East Germany	Andrzej Wroński; Poland
130 kg	Alexandr Karelin; Soviet Union	Rangel Gerovski; Bulgaria	Ioan Grigoraș; Romania
