= Wrestling at the 1984 Summer Olympics – Men's freestyle 48 kg =

Men's freestyle 48 kg at the Games of the XXIII Olympiad
- Venue: Anaheim Convention Center
- Dates: 7–9 August 1984
- Competitors: 7 from 7 nations

Medalists
1st place, gold medalist(s)		Bobby Weaver	United States
2nd place, silver medalist(s)		Takashi Irie	Japan
3rd place, bronze medalist(s)		Son Gab-Do	South Korea

The Men's Freestyle 48 kg at the 1984 Summer Olympics as part of the wrestling program were held at the Anaheim Convention Center, Anaheim, California.

== Medalists ==
Gold	Bobby Weaver; United States
Silver	Takashi Irie; Japan
Bronze	Son Gab-Do; South Korea

== Tournament results ==
The wrestlers are divided into 2 groups. The winner of each group decided by a double-elimination system.

Legend

- TF — Won by Fall
- ST — Won by Technical Superiority, 12 points difference
- PP — Won by Points, 1-7 points difference, the loser with points
- PO — Won by Points, 1-7 points difference, the loser without points
- SP — Won by Points, 8-11 points difference, the loser with points
- SO — Won by Points, 8-11 points difference, the loser without points
- P0 — Won by Passivity, scoring zero points
- P1 — Won by Passivity, while leading by 1-7 points
- PS — Won by Passivity, while leading by 8-11 points
- DC — Won by Decision, 0-0 score
- PA — Won by Opponent Injury
- DQ — Won by Forfeit
- DNA — Did not appear
- L — Losses
- ER — Round of Elimination
- CP — Classification Points
- TP — Technical Points

=== Eliminatory round ===
==== Group A ====
L		CP	TP		L
Round 1
0	Son Gab-Do (KOR)	4-0 ST	12-0	Sunil Dutt (IND)	1
0	Takashi Irie (JPN)	4-0 TF	0:37	Kent Andersson (SWE)	1
Round 2
1	Son Gab-Do (KOR)	1-3 PP	7-8	Takashi Irie (JPN)	0
2	Sunil Dutt (IND)	1-3 DC	0-0	Kent Andersson (SWE)	1
Final
	Takashi Irie (JPN)	4-0 TF	0:37	Kent Andersson (SWE)	
	Son Gab-Do (KOR)	1-3 PP	7-8	Takashi Irie (JPN)	
	Kent Andersson (SWE)	0-4 ST	0-12	Son Gab-Do (KOR)	

Wrestler	L	ER	CP	Final
Takashi Irie (JPN)	0	-	7	7
Son Gab-Do (KOR)	1	-	5	5
Kent Andersson (SWE)	1	-	3	0
Sunil Dutt (IND)	2	2	1	

==== Group B ====
L		CP	TP		L
Final
	Reiner Heugabel (FRG)	1-3 PP	4-9	Gao Wenhe (CHN)	
	Bobby Weaver (USA)	4-0 TF	2:56	Reiner Heugabel (FRG)	
	Gao Wenhe (CHN)	0-4 ST	0-13	Bobby Weaver (USA)	

Wrestler	L	ER	CP	Final
Bobby Weaver (USA)	0	-	0	8
Gao Wenhe (CHN)	0	-	0	3
Reiner Heugabel (FRG)	0	-	0	1

=== Final round ===
	CP	TP	
5th place match
Kent Andersson (SWE)	0-3 P1	5:21	Reiner Heugabel (FRG)
Bronze medal match
Son Gab-Do (KOR)	3-1 PP	13-7	Gao Wenhe (CHN)
Gold medal match
Takashi Irie (JPN)	0-4 TF	2:58	Bobby Weaver (USA)

== Final standings ==
1. Bobby Weaver (USA)
2. Takashi Irie (JPN)
3. Son Gab-Do (KOR)
4. Gao Wenhe (CHN)
5. Reiner Heugabel (FRG)
6. Kent Andersson (SWE)
7. Sunil Dutt (IND)
