= Nik Zagranitchni =

Israeli wrestler (born 1969)

Nik Zagranitchni ניק זגרניצ'ני
Personal information
- Born: November 21, 1969 (age 56)
- Height: 5 ft 3.5 in (161 cm)
- Weight: 115 lb (52 kg)

Sport
- Style: Greco-Roman
- Club: Hapoel Tel Aviv

Nik Zagranitchni (Hebrew: ניק זגרניצ'ני; born November 21, 1969) is an Israeli Olympic wrestler.

He is Jewish, and made aliyah (emigrated to Israel) from Ukraine in early 1991.

== Wrestling career ==
His sports club was Hapoel Tel Aviv, in Tel Aviv, Israel.

Zagranitchni came in 8th at the 1991 Wrestling World Championship in 48.0 kg Greco-Roman.

He competed for Israel at the 1992 Summer Olympics, at 22 years of age, in Barcelona, Spain, in Greco-Roman Wrestling--Men's Light-Flyweight (48 kg). In the first round he defeated Omer Elmas of Turkey, in the second round Zagranitchni lost to Mark Fuller of the US, and in the third round he was defeated by Wilber Sánchez of Cuba who went on to win the bronze medal. He tied for 11th place. When he competed in the Olympics, Zagranitchni was 5 ft 3.5 in (161 cm) tall, and weighed 115 lb (52 kg).

At the 1993 European Championship at 48.0 kg Greco-Roman, Zagranitchni won the silver medal. At the 1994 World Championship in 48.0 kg. Greco-Roman he came in 11th, and at the 1994 European Championship at 48.0 kg Greco-Roman he came in 11th.

At the 1995 European Championship at 52.0 kg Greco-Roman he came in 14th, and at the 1995 World Championship at 52.0 kg Greco-Roman, Zagranitchni came in 22nd. At the 1996 European Championship at 48.0 kg Greco-Roman he came in 7th.
