= Antinori (surname) =

Antinori is an Italian surname. Notable people with the surname include:

- Edgardo Antinori (born 1969), Argentine judoka
- Ignacio Antinori (1885–1940), Italian-born American mobster
- Luigi Antinori, 18th century singer
- Orazio Antinori (1811–1882), Italian explorer and zoologist
- Severino Antinori (born 1945), Italian gynecologist and embryologist
- Vincenzo Antinori (1792–1865), Italian science administrator
