= Jiang Wei (disambiguation) =

Jiang Wei could be:

- Jiang Wei (Chinese: 姜维), a Chinese military general and politician of the state of Shu Han during the Three Kingdoms period of China.
- Jiang Wei (jurist) (Chinese: 姜伟), a Chinese jurist.
- Jiang Wei (wrestler), is a Chinese wrestler.
