= Dov Groverman =

Israeli wrestler

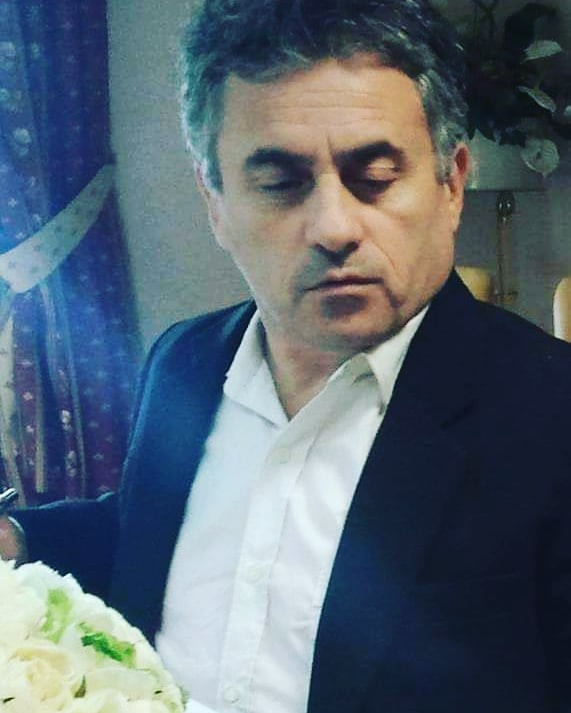
- Dov Groberman, 2011

Personal information
- Native name: דב גרוברמן
- Born: April 5, 1965 (age 61)

Sport
- Country: Israel
- Sport: Wrestling
- Weight class: Light-Flyweight
- Event: Greco-Roman

Dov Groverman (Hebrew: דב גרוברמן; sometimes "Groberman" or "Grobermann"; born April 5, 1965) is an Israeli former Olympic wrestler. He is Jewish.

== Wrestling career ==
Groverman won a silver medal at the 1980 World Junior Championships in 40.0 kg Greco-Roman. At the 1987 World Wrestling Championships: 48.0 kg. Greco-Roman, he came in 13th.

Groverman competed for Israel at the 1988 Summer Olympics in Seoul, at the age of 23, in Wrestling--Men's Light-Flyweight (48 kg), Greco-Roman. Abullah Alizani from the Yemen Arab Republic, his opponent in the first round, failed to show up for his match against the Israeli even after he was paged three times, in what an Israeli official called a political snub, and Alizani was declared the loser of the match by the referee. Groverman was eliminated after three rounds. When he competed in the Olympics, he was 4 feet 11 inches (150 cm) tall, and weighed 115 pounds (52 kg).

At the 1991 World Wrestling Championships: 52.0 kg. Greco-Roman, Groverman came in 12th.
