= Sérgio Oliveira (disambiguation) =

Sérgio Oliveira (born 1992) is a Portuguese football midfielder.

Sérgio Oliveira may also refer to:

- Sérgio Oliveira (judoka) (born 1967), Brazilian judoka
- Sérgio Pacheco de Oliveira (born 1981), Brazilian football midfielder
