= Elmaz =

Elmaz is a masculine given name. Notable people with the name include:

- Elmaz Abinader (born 1954), Arab-American author, poet, and academic
- Elmaz Boçe (1852–1925), Albanian educator

== See also ==
- Elmas (surname)
