= Kent Andersson =

Kent Andersson may refer to:

- Kent Andersson (playwright) (1933–2005), Swedish actor, theatre director and playwright
- Kent Andersson (motorcyclist) (1942–2006), Swedish motorcycle racer
- Kent-Erik Andersson (born 1951), Swedish hockey right winger
- Kent Andersson (footballer), Swedish footballer
- Kent Andersson (wrestler) (born 1959), Swedish Olympic wrestler
