= Abdullah Al-Izani =

Yemeni sport wrestler

Personal information
- Born: 1 October 1968 (age 57)

Sport
- Country: Yemen
- Sport: Greco-Roman wrestling

Abdullah Alizani (also "Abdallah" and "Al-Izani"; عبد الله العزاني; born October 1, 1968) is a wrestler from the Yemen Arab Republic.

Alizani lost in both his first and second rounds at the 1988 Summer Olympics in Men's Light-Flyweight (48 kg), Greco-Roman matches, and was eliminated. He also competed internationally for Yemen at the 1996 Summer Olympics.

== Career ==
Al-Izani competed in the Greco-Roman 48kg contest at the 1996 Summer Olympics, heldin Atlanta, Georgia, United States, he had two fights but lost them both due to grand superiority, they were against Bratan Tsenov from Bulgaria and Tahir Zahidov from Azerbaijan.
