= Chung Hoon =

South Korean judoka (born 1969)

Personal information
- Born: 29 April 1969 (age 57)
- Occupation: Judoka

Korean name
- Hangul: 정훈
- Hanja: 鄭勳
- RR: Jeong Hun
- MR: Chŏng Hun

Sport
- Country: South Korea
- Sport: Judo
- Weight class: ‍–‍71 kg

Achievements and titles
- Olympic Games: (bronze) (1992)
- World Champ.: (gold) (1993)
- Asian Champ.: (gold) (1990, 1991, 1994)
Medal record
Men's judo
Representing South Korea
Olympic Games
Bronze medal – third place	1992 Barcelona	‍–‍71 kg
World Championships
Gold medal – first place	1993 Hamilton	‍–‍71 kg
Bronze medal – third place	1991 Barcelona	‍–‍71 kg
Asian Games
Gold medal – first place	1990 Beijing	‍–‍71 kg
Gold medal – first place	1994 Hiroshima	‍–‍71 kg
Asian Championships
Gold medal – first place	1991 Osaka	‍–‍71 kg

Profile at external databases
- IJF: 145
- JudoInside.com: 3661
- Updated on 5 June 2023

Chung Hoon (Korean: 정훈; born 29 April 1969) is a South Korean judoka.

== Early life ==
Chung was born in Buan County, North Jeolla Province, South Korea.

== Career ==
Chung was the World Champion at ‍–‍71 kg in 1993. He won a bronze medal in the 1991 World Championships.

Chung represented South Korea at the 1992 Summer Olympics, winning bronze in the Lightweight division. In the semifinal, he lost to Hungarian Bertalan Hajtós. Next year, Chung went up against the Hungarian judoka again in the final at the World Championship and avenged the loss by decision.

Chung retired from competitive judo after winning his second Asian Games gold medal in 1994. Chung has been serving as a judo instructor and professor for Yong-In University and the head coach of the South Korean national judo team.
