= Luc Rasoanaivo-Razafy =

Malagasy judoka

Personal information
- Nationality: Malagasy
- Born: 18 November 1965 (age 59)

Sport
- Sport: Judo

Luc Rasoanaivo-Razafy (born 18 November 1965) is a Malagasy judoka. He competed in the men's lightweight event at the 1992 Summer Olympics.
