= Jorma Korhonen =

Finnish judoka

Medal record

Men's judo

European Championships
Gold medal – first place	1989 Helsinki	71 kg
Silver medal – second place	1990 Frankfurt	71 kg
Bronze medal – third place	1993 Athens	71 kg

Jorma Petteri Korhonen (born 23 March 1968) is a Finnish judoka. He competed in the men's lightweight event at the 1992 Summer Olympics.

== Achievements ==
Year	Tournament	Place	Weight class
1997	World Judo Championships	5th	Lightweight (71 kg)
1996	European Judo Championships	5th	Lightweight (71 kg)
1994	European Judo Championships	5th	Lightweight (71 kg)
1994	European Judo Championships	3rd	Lightweight (71 kg)
1990	European Judo Championships	2nd	Lightweight (71 kg)
1989	World Judo Championships	7th	Lightweight (71 kg)
1989	European Judo Championships	1st	Lightweight (71 kg)
