= Mohamed Hassoun =

Syrian wrestler

Personal information
- Nationality: Syrian
- Born: 9 June 1968 (age 58)

Sport
- Sport: Wrestling

Mohamed Hassoun (Arabic: محمد حسون; born 9 June 1968) is a Syrian wrestler. He competed in the men's Greco-Roman 48 kg at the 1992 Summer Olympics, losing both of his matches.
