= Masanori Ohashi =

Japanese wrestler

Personal information
- Nationality: Japanese
- Born: 7 December 1964 (age 61) Gifu, Japan

Sport
- Sport: Wrestling

Masanori Ohashi (born 7 December 1964) is a Japanese wrestler. He competed in the men's Greco-Roman 48 kg at the 1992 Summer Olympics.
