= Lusambu Mafuta =

Congolese judoka

Personal information
- Nationality: Congolese
- Born: 7 May 1969 (age 55)
- Occupation: Judoka

Sport
- Sport: Judo

Profile at external databases
- JudoInside.com: 50849

Lusambu Mafuta (born 7 May 1969) is a Congolese judoka. He competed in the men's lightweight event at the 1992 Summer Olympics.
