= José Maria de Jesús =

Angolan judoka (born 1968)

Personal information
- Nationality: Angolan
- Born: 13 April 1968 (age 56)

Sport
- Sport: Judo

José Maria de Jesús (born 13 April 1968) is an Angolan judoka. He competed in the men's lightweight event at the 1992 Summer Olympics.
