= Eyal Stigman =

Israeli swimmer

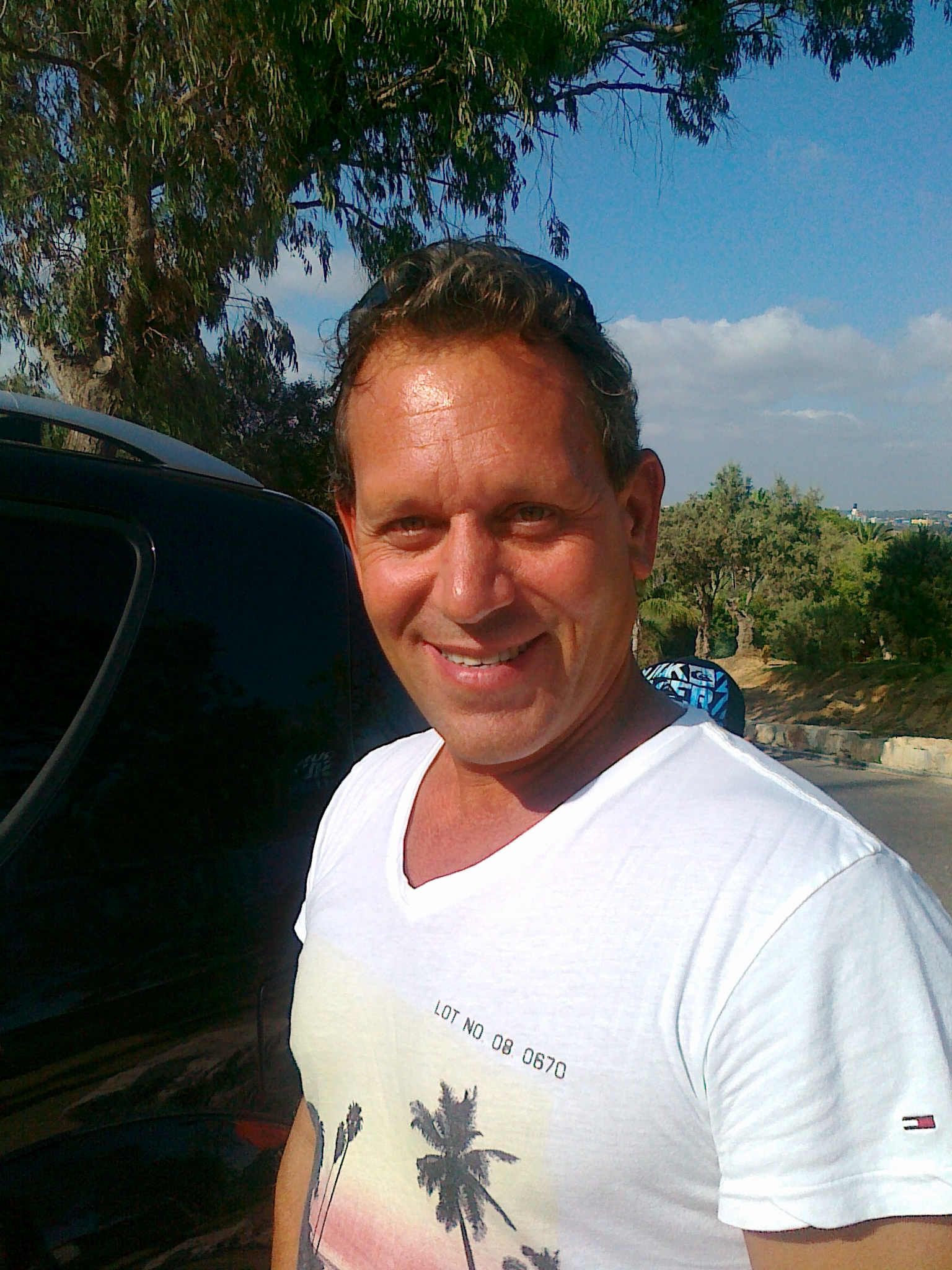
- Eyal Stigman (2013)

Personal information
- National team: Israel
- Born: איל שטיגמן; June 9, 1963 (age 63)
- Height: 5 ft 8.5 in (174.0 cm)
- Weight: 163 lb (74 kg)

Sport
- Sport: Swimming
- Strokes: breaststroke; individual medley

Eyal Stigman (Hebrew: איל שטיגמן; also "Shtigman"; born June 9, 1963) is an Israeli former Olympic swimmer. When he competed in the Olympics, he was 5 ft 8.5 in (174.0 cm) tall and weighed 163 lb (74 kg).

== Swimming career ==
Stigman competed for Israel at the 1984 Summer Olympics in Los Angeles, at the age of 21, in Swimming--Men's 100 metre Breaststroke, and came in 22nd with a time of 1:05.63. He also competed in the Men's 200 metre Breaststroke, and came in 23rd with a time of 2:24.93.

Swimming for Israel at the 1985 Maccabiah Games, Stigman won the gold medal and set a Maccabiah Games and Israeli record in the 100 meter breaststroke.

Stigman competed for Israel at the 1988 Summer Olympics in Seoul, at the age of 25, in Swimming--Men's 100 metre Breaststroke, and came in 42nd with a time of 1:05.92. He also competed in the Men's 200 metre Breaststroke, and came in 37th with at time of 2:25.18.

In 2007 Stigman set Israeli national swimming records for the 40-and-under age group, while swimming for Maccabi Rishon LeZion, in the 50 meter breaststroke with a time of 33.13, and in the 200 meter individual medley with a time of 2:32:07.
