= Takashi Irie =

Japanese freestyle wrestler

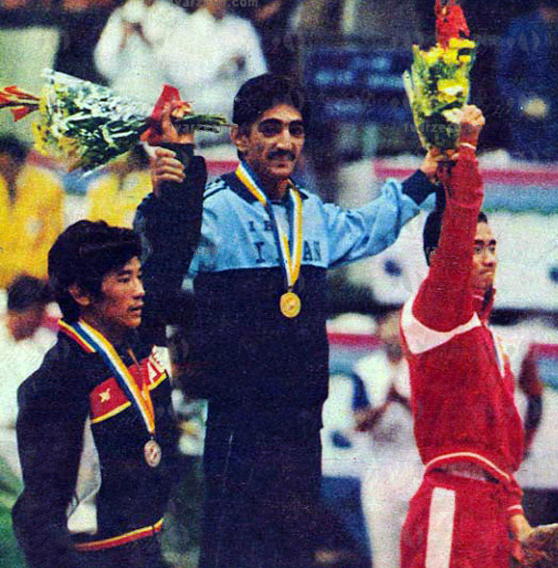
- Irie (right) at the 1986 Asian Games

Personal information
- Native name: 入江 隆
- Born: May 10, 1958 (age 68) Ibaraki Prefecture, Japan
- Height: 155 cm (5 ft 1 in)

Sport
- Sport: Freestyle wrestling
Medal record
Representing Japan
Summer Olympics
Silver medal – second place	1984 Los Angeles	-48 kg
Asian Games
Gold medal – first place	1978 Bangkok	-48 kg
Bronze medal – third place	1986 Seoul	-48 kg
Asian Championships
Gold medal – first place	1979 Jalandhar	-48 kg

Takashi Irie (Japanese: 入江 隆, born May 10, 1958) is a retired Japanese light-flyweight freestyle wrestler. He won a silver medal at the 1984 Olympics and a gold medal at the 1978 Asian Games. In 1986, he secured third place at the Asian Games.
