= Wahid Yudhi Sulistianto =

Indonesian judoka

Personal information
- Nationality: Indonesian
- Born: 22 August 1972 (age 52)

Sport
- Sport: Judo

Wahid Yudhi Sulistianto (born 22 August 1972) is an Indonesian judoka. He competed in the men's lightweight event at the 1992 Summer Olympics.
