= Yang Zhizhong =

Chinese wrestler

Personal information
- Nationality: Chinese
- Born: 25 December 1968 (age 57)

Sport
- Sport: Wrestling

Yang Zhizhong (born 25 December 1968) is a Chinese wrestler. He competed in the men's Greco-Roman 48 kg at the 1988 Summer Olympics.
