= Fuat Yıldız =

German wrestler

Personal information
- Nationality: German
- Born: 1 April 1965 (age 61) Kars, Turkey

Sport
- Sport: Wrestling

Fuat Yıldız (born 1 April 1965) is a Turkish-born German wrestler. He competed in the men's Greco-Roman 48 kg at the 1992 Summer Olympics.
