= Wiesław Błach =

Polish judoka (born 1962)

Personal information
- Born: 25 March 1962 (age 64) Opole, Poland
- Occupation: Judoka

Sport
- Country: Poland
- Sport: Judo
- Weight class: ‍–‍71 kg

Achievements and titles
- Olympic Games: 7th (1992)
- World Champ.: (bronze) (1985)
- European Champ.: (gold) (1987)
Medal record
Men's judo
Representing Poland
World Championships
Bronze medal – third place	1985 Seoul	‍–‍71 kg
European Championships
Gold medal – first place	1987 Paris	‍–‍71 kg
Bronze medal – third place	1986 Belgrade	‍–‍71 kg
Bronze medal – third place	1990 Frankfurt	‍–‍71 kg
Summer Universiade
Silver medal – second place	1982 Jyväskylä	‍–‍71 kg
Friendship Games
Bronze medal – third place	1984 Warsaw	‍–‍71 kg

Profile at external databases
- IJF: 11840, 777
- JudoInside.com: 1088
- Updated on 9 July 2024

Wiesław Błach (born 25 March 1962) is a Polish judoka. He competed at the 1988 Summer Olympics and the 1992 Summer Olympics.
