= Elmas (surname) =

Elmas is a Turkish surname. Notable people with the surname include:

- Eljif Elmas (born 1999), Macedonian footballer
- Ferdi Elmas (born 1985), Turkish footballer
- Fevzi Elmas (born 1983), Turkish footballer
- Omer Elmas (born 1968 or 1969), Turkish Olympic wrestler
- Stéphan Elmas (1862–1937), Armenian composer
