= Ignacio Sayu =

Cuban judoka (born 1966)

Personal information
- Nationality: Cuban
- Born: 1 February 1966 (age 59)

Sport
- Sport: Judo

Ignacio Sayu (born 1 February 1966) is a Cuban judoka. He competed in the men's lightweight event at the 1992 Summer Olympics.
