= Lars Rønningen =

Norwegian sport wrestler (born 1965)

Personal information
- Born: 24 November 1965 (age 60) Oslo, Norway

Sport
- Country: Norway

Lars Rønningen (born 24 November 1965) is a retired Norwegian sport wrestler. He won the European Championship in 1988 and 1992.

He was born in Oslo, and represented the sports clubs Kolbotn IL, SK av 1909 and Oslo BK. He is a brother of Jon Rønningen.

Competing mostly in the light-flyweight division, he had success at the European Championships, where he finished fourth in 1982 and 1986, won in 1988 and 1992 and finished fourth again in 1993 (the latter in flyweight). At the World Championships he finished fourth in 1986, won a bronze medal in 1987 and silver medal in 1989.

At the 1984 Olympic Games he finished seventh. At the 1988 Olympic Games he was eliminated after round three, and at the 1992 Olympic Games he finished eighth. He took eight Norwegian national titles between 1981 and 1992.
