= Magomedbek Aliyev =

Russian judoka

Personal information
- Nationality: Russian
- Born: 14 May 1967 (age 57); Makhachkala, Dagestan, Russian SSR, USSR

Sport
- Sport: Judo

Magomedbek Aliyev (born 14 May 1967) is a Russian judoka. He competed in the men's lightweight event at the 1992 Summer Olympics, representing the Unified Team.
