= Miroslav Jočić =

Serbian judoka

Personal information
- Nationality: Serbian
- Born: 20 June 1962 (age 62)

Sport
- Sport: Judo

Miroslav Jočić (Serbian Cyrillic: Мирослав Јочић; born 20 June 1962) is a Serbian judoka. He competed in the men's lightweight event at the 1992 Summer Olympics.
