= Rubens Joseph =

Haitian judoka

Personal information
- Nationality: Haitian
- Born: 12 October 1968 (age 56)

Sport
- Sport: Judo

Rubens Joseph (born 12 October 1968) is a Haitian judoka. He competed in the men's lightweight event at the 1992 Summer Olympics.
