= Hady Kahy =

Lebanese judoka

Personal information
- Full name: Hady George Kahy
- Nationality: Lebanese
- Born: 2 April 1968 (age 56)
- Education: B.S., Economics, The American University of Beirut, Lebanon M.B.A., Notre Dame University, Lebanon M.Phil., International Political Economy, University of Tsukuba, Japan Ph.D., International Political Economy, University of Tsukuba, Japan

Sport
- Sport: Judo

Hady George Kahy (born 2 April 1968) is a Lebanese judoka and economist. He competed in the men's lightweight event at the 1992 Summer Olympics. His last result at the event was a ranking of 22nd for the men's lightweight 71 kg category. He is currently an associate professor of economics and political economy at Temple University, Japan Campus.
