= Sunil Dutt (wrestler) =

Indian wrestler

Personal information
- Nationality: Indian
- Born: 9 December 1967 (age 58)

Sport
- Sport: Wrestling

Sunil Dutt (born 9 December 1967) is an Indian wrestler. He competed in the men's freestyle 48 kg at the 1984 Summer Olympics.
