= Laurent Pellet =

Swiss judoka

Laurent Pellet (born 31 July 1970) is a Swiss judoka. He competed in the men's lightweight event at the 1992 Summer Olympics.

== Achievements ==
Year	Tournament	Place	Weight class
1995	European Judo Championships	5th	Lightweight (71 kg)
1993	European Judo Championships	7th	Lightweight (71 kg)
