= Norbert Haimberger =

Austrian judoka

Personal information
- Nationality: Austrian
- Born: 3 May 1969 (age 55); Vienna, Austria
- Occupation: Judoka

Sport
- Sport: Judo
- Weight class: –78 kg
- Rank: 4th dan black belt
- League: Austrian 1. Bundesliga
- Club: JGV-Schuh-Ski-Wien

Profile at external databases
- JudoInside.com: 3195

Norbert Haimberger (born 3 May 1969) is an Austrian judoka. He competed in the men's lightweight event at the 1992 Summer Olympics.

== Awards ==
- 2018: Honorary member of the Judo Association Vienna
