= Gustavo Delgado =

Mexican wrestler (born 1960)

Personal information
- Nationality: Mexican
- Born: 8 September 1960 (age 65)

Sport
- Sport: Wrestling

Gustavo Delgado (born 8 September 1960) is a Mexican wrestler. He competed in the men's Greco-Roman 48 kg at the 1984 Summer Olympics.
