= Park Yong-i =

North Korean judoka

Personal information
- Nationality: North Korean
- Born: 14 February 1972 (age 53)

Sport
- Sport: Judo

Park Yong-i (born 14 February 1972) is a North Korean judoka. He competed in the men's lightweight event at the 1992 Summer Olympics.
