= Malick Seck =

Senegalese judoka

Personal information
- Nationality: Senegalese
- Born: 7 April 1964
- Died: 2020 (aged 55–56)

Sport
- Sport: Judo

Malick Seck (7 April 1964 – 2020) was a Senegalese judoka. He competed in the men's lightweight event at the 1992 Summer Olympics.
