= Shi Chengsheng =

Chinese judoka

Personal information
- Nationality: Chinese
- Born: 4 March 1967 (age 58)

Sport
- Sport: Judo

Shi Chengsheng (born 4 March 1967) is a Chinese judoka. He competed in the men's lightweight event at the 1992 Summer Olympics.
