= Nuran Pelikyan =

Bulgarian wrestler

Personal information
- Nationality: Bulgarian
- Born: 12 December 1967 (age 58) Plovdiv, Bulgaria

Sport
- Sport: Wrestling

Nuran Pelikyan (born 12 December 1967) is a Bulgarian wrestler. He competed in the men's Greco-Roman 48 kg at the 1992 Summer Olympics.
