= Rui Domingues =

Portuguese judoka

Personal information
- Nationality: Portuguese
- Born: 15 April 1964 (age 60)
- Occupation: Judoka

Sport
- Sport: Judo

Rui Domingues (born 15 April 1964) is a Portuguese judoka. He competed in the men's lightweight event at the 1992 Summer Olympics.
