= Josef Věnsek =

Czech judoka

Medal record

Men's judo

European Championships
Silver medal – second place	1991 Prague	71 kg

Josef Věnsek (born 27 June 1967) is a Czech judoka. He competed in the men's lightweight event at the 1992 Summer Olympics.

== Achievements ==
Year	Tournament	Place	Weight class
1994	European Judo Championships	5th	Lightweight (71 kg)
1993	European Judo Championships	7th	Lightweight (71 kg)
1991	World Judo Championships	7th	Lightweight (71 kg)
1991	European Judo Championships	2nd	Lightweight (71 kg)
1990	European Judo Championships	7th	Lightweight (71 kg)

2009 World Master Judo Championships 1st 73 kg

2005 Virginia Beach National Championships 1st 73 kg

2005 Liberty Bell Classic Judo Championships 1st 73 kg

2005 Ippon Open 1st 73 kg

1999 Czech Cup Prague 5th 73 kg

1998 World Masters Munich 2nd 73 kg

1997 German Open Bonn 3rd 71 kg

1996 Swiss International Basel 1st 71 kg

1996 Czech Cup Prague 3rd 71 kg

1994 German Open Russelsheim 3rd 71 kg

1994 European Championships Gdansk 5th 71 kg

1994 Czech Cup Prague 3rd 71 kg

1994 ASKO World Tournament Leonding 3rd 71 kg

1993 ASKO World Tournament Leonding 3rd 71 kg

1993 European Championships Athens 7th 71 kg

1993 Czech Cup Prague 3rd 71 kg

1992 Barcelona Olympic Game Team Member

1992 Czechoslovakia Championships Hradec Kralove 3rd 71 kg

1992 Polish Open Warsaw 1st 71 kg

1991 World Championships Barcelona 7th 71 kg

1991 European Championships Prague 2nd 71 kg

1991 World Masters Munich 7th 71 kg

1991 A-Tournament Sofia "Liberation" 1st 71 kg

1990 Czechoslovakia Championships Martin 1st 71 kg

1990 European Championships Frankfurt 7th 71 kg

1989 Czechoslovakia Championships Prague 1st 71 kg

1988 Czechoslovakia Championships Prague 1st 71 kg

1988 International Tournament "Liberation" Lovetch 3rd 71 kg

1987 Czechoslovakia Championships 1st 71 kg

1987 Czechoslovakia Junior Championships Ostrava 1st 71 kg

1987 International Tournament Damascus 1st 71 kg

1986 European Junior Championships Leonding 5th 71 kg

1986 Czechoslovakia Junior Championships Jicin 1st 71 kg

1986 International Tournament Olsztyn 3rd 71 kg

1986 World Junior Championships Rome 7th 71 kg

1985 Czechoslovakia Junior Championships Jicin 1st 65 kg

1985 Czechoslovakia Championships Hradec Kralove 1st 65 kg

1982 Czechoslovakia Junior Championships Hradec Kralove 3rd Lightweight 60 kg
