= Li Haisheng =

Chinese wrestler (born 1964)

Personal information
- Full name: Chinese: 李 海生; pinyin: Lǐ Hǎi-shēng
- Nationality: Chinese
- Born: 2 January 1964 (age 62)

Sport
- Sport: Wrestling

Li Haisheng (born 2 January 1964) is a Chinese wrestler. He competed in the men's Greco-Roman 48 kg at the 1984 Summer Olympics.
