= Son Gab-do =

South Korean wrestler (born 1960)

Personal information
- Born: 12 July 1960 (age 66)

Sport
- Sport: Freestyle wrestling
Medal record
Representing South Korea
Olympic Games
Bronze medal – third place	1984 Los Angeles	Light-flyweight
Asian Games
Bronze medal – third place	1982 New Delhi	Light-flyweight
Bronze medal – third place	1986 Seoul	Light-flyweight
Summer Universiade
Bronze medal – third place	1981 Bucharest	Light-flyweight

Son Gab-Do (Korean: 손갑도, born 12 July 1960) is a Korean former wrestler who competed in the 1984 Summer Olympics.
