= Mario González (judoka) =

Mexican judoka (born 1971)

Personal information
- Nationality: Mexican
- Born: 27 January 1971 (age 55)

Sport
- Sport: Judo
Medal record
Representing Mexico
Pan American Games
Gold medal – first place	1991 Havana	Lightweight
Central American and Caribbean Games
Gold medal – first place	1993 Ponce	Lightweight
Silver medal – second place	1990 Mexico City	Lightweight

Mario González Aguilera (born 27 January 1971) is a Mexican judoka. He competed in the men's lightweight event at the 1992 Summer Olympics.
