= Israel at the 1988 Summer Olympics =

- IOC code: ISR
- NOC: Olympic Committee of Israel

in Seoul
- Competitors: 19 (15 men and 4 women) in 7 sports
- Flag bearer: Itzhak Yonassi
- Medals: Gold 0 Silver 0 Bronze 0 Total 0

Summer Olympics appearances (overview)
- 1952; 1956; 1960; 1964; 1968; 1972; 1976; 1980; 1984; 1988; 1992; 1996; 2000; 2004; 2008; 2012; 2016; 2020; 2024; 2028

Israeli athletes competed at the 1988 Summer Olympics in Seoul, South Korea.

Most members of the delegation abstained from food and competition on Yom Kippur.

== Competitors ==
The following is the list of number of competitors in the Games.

Sport	Men	Women	Total
Boxing	3	–	3
Gymnastics	0	3	3
Sailing	4	0	4
Shooting	2	0	2
Swimming	1	0	1
Tennis	3	1	4
Wrestling	2	–	2
Total	15	4	19

== Results by event ==
=== Boxing ===
Event	Participant	Round	Result	Ref
Men's Light Flyweight – 48 kg	Yehuda Ben Haim	First Round	Bye	
Men's Light Flyweight – 48 kg	Yehuda Ben Haim	Second Round	Lost to Henry Martínez (ESA)	
Men's Featherweight – 57 kg	Ya'acov Shmuel	First Round	Bye	
Men's Featherweight – 57 kg	Ya'acov Shmuel	Second Round	Defeated John Mirona (SUD), RSC-1	
Men's Featherweight – 57 kg	Ya'acov Shmuel	Third round	Defeated Richard Pittman (COK), 5:0	
Men's Featherweight – 57 kg	Ya'acov Shmuel	Quarterfinals; 5th (tied)	Lost to Giovanni Parisi (ITA), 0:5	
Middleweight – 75 kg	Aharon Jacobashvili	First round	Lost to Sven Ottke (FRG), 0:5	

=== Gymnastics ===
Event	Participant	Result	Ref
Artistic Gymnastics	Revital Sharon		
Rhythmic Gymnastics	Shulamit Goldstein		
Rhythmic Gymnastics	Rakefet Remigolski		

=== Sailing ===
Event	Participant	Result	Ref
Men's 470	Dan Torten and Ran Torten	18th place	
Flying Dutchman	Yoel Sela and Eldad Amir	4th place	

=== Shooting ===
Event	Participant	Result	Ref
	Eduard Papirov		
	Yitzhak Yonassi		

=== Swimming ===
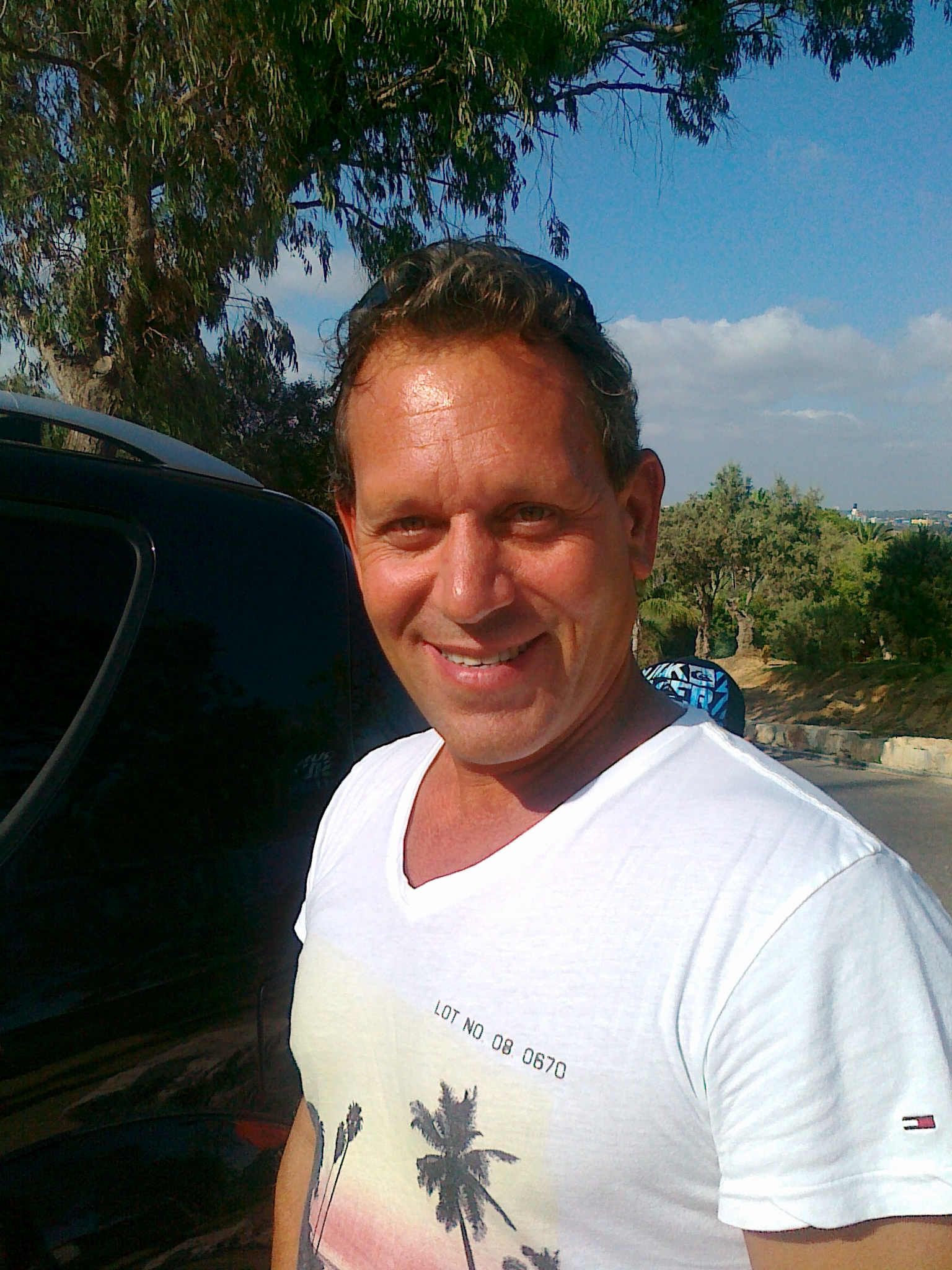
Eyal Stigman

Event	Participant	Round	Time	Result	Ref
Men's 100m Breaststroke	Eyal Stigman	Heat	1:05.92	42nd place did not advance	
Men's 200m Breaststroke	Eyal Stigman	Heat	2:25.18	37th place did not advance	

=== Tennis ===
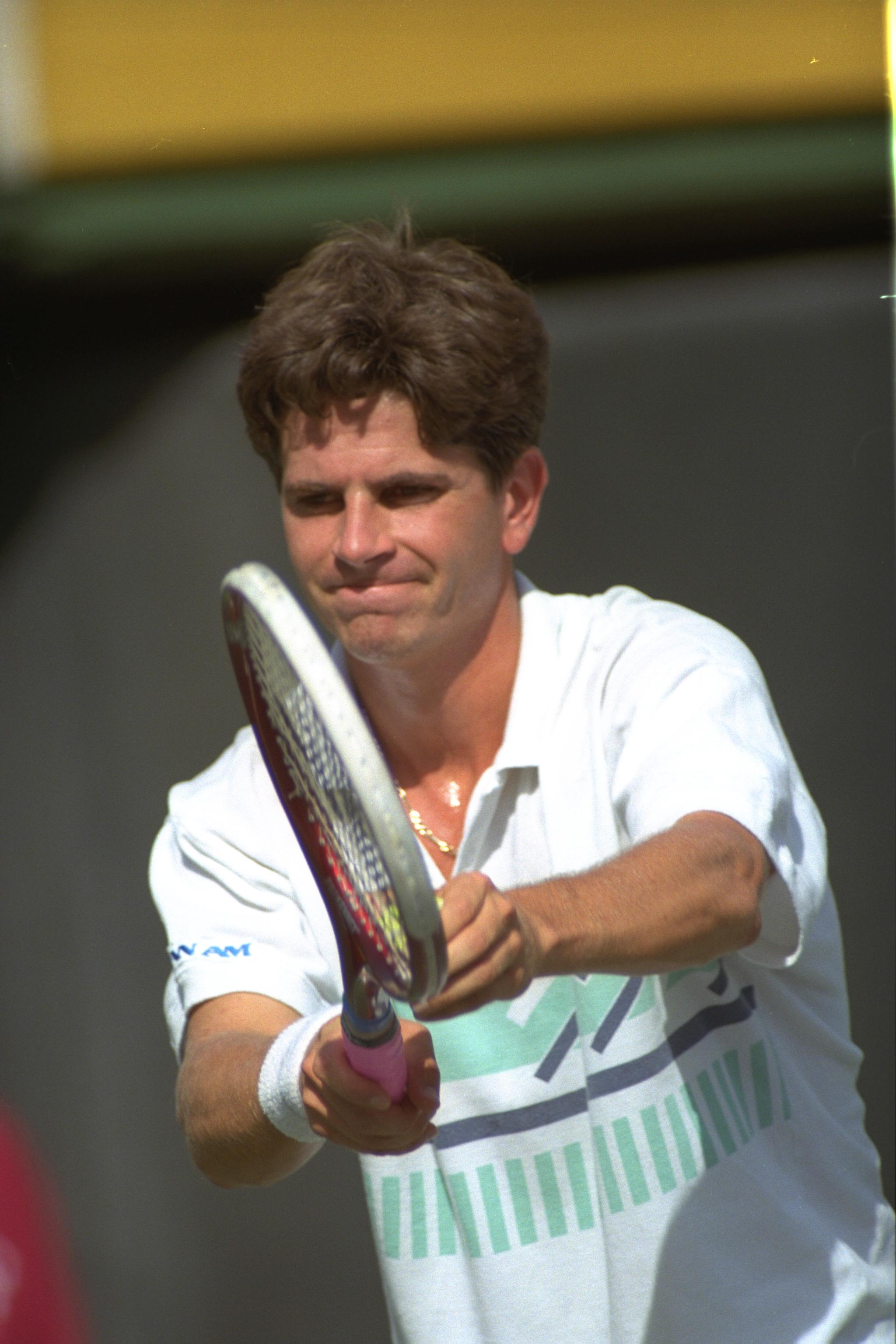
Amos Mansdorf

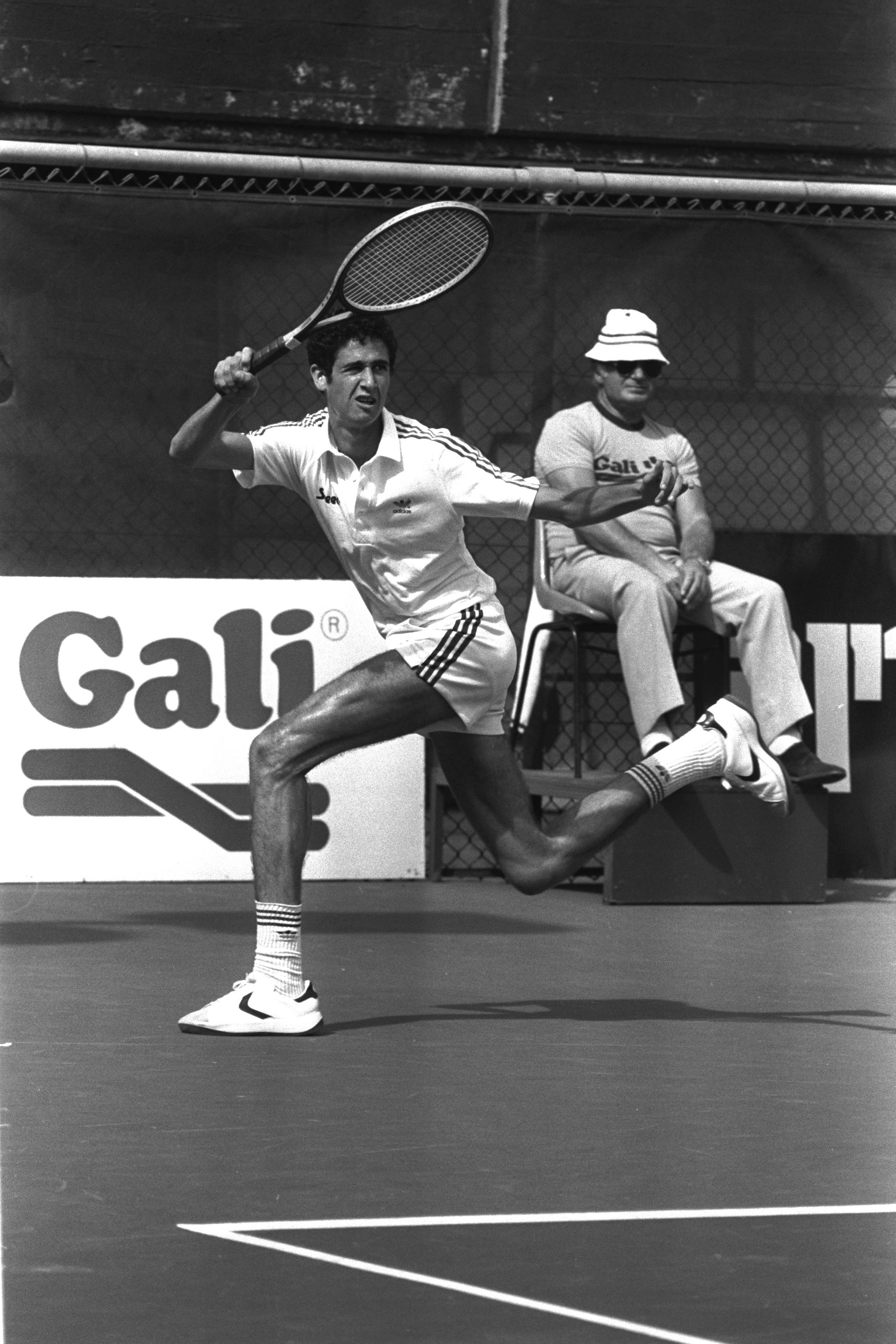
Shahar Perkiss

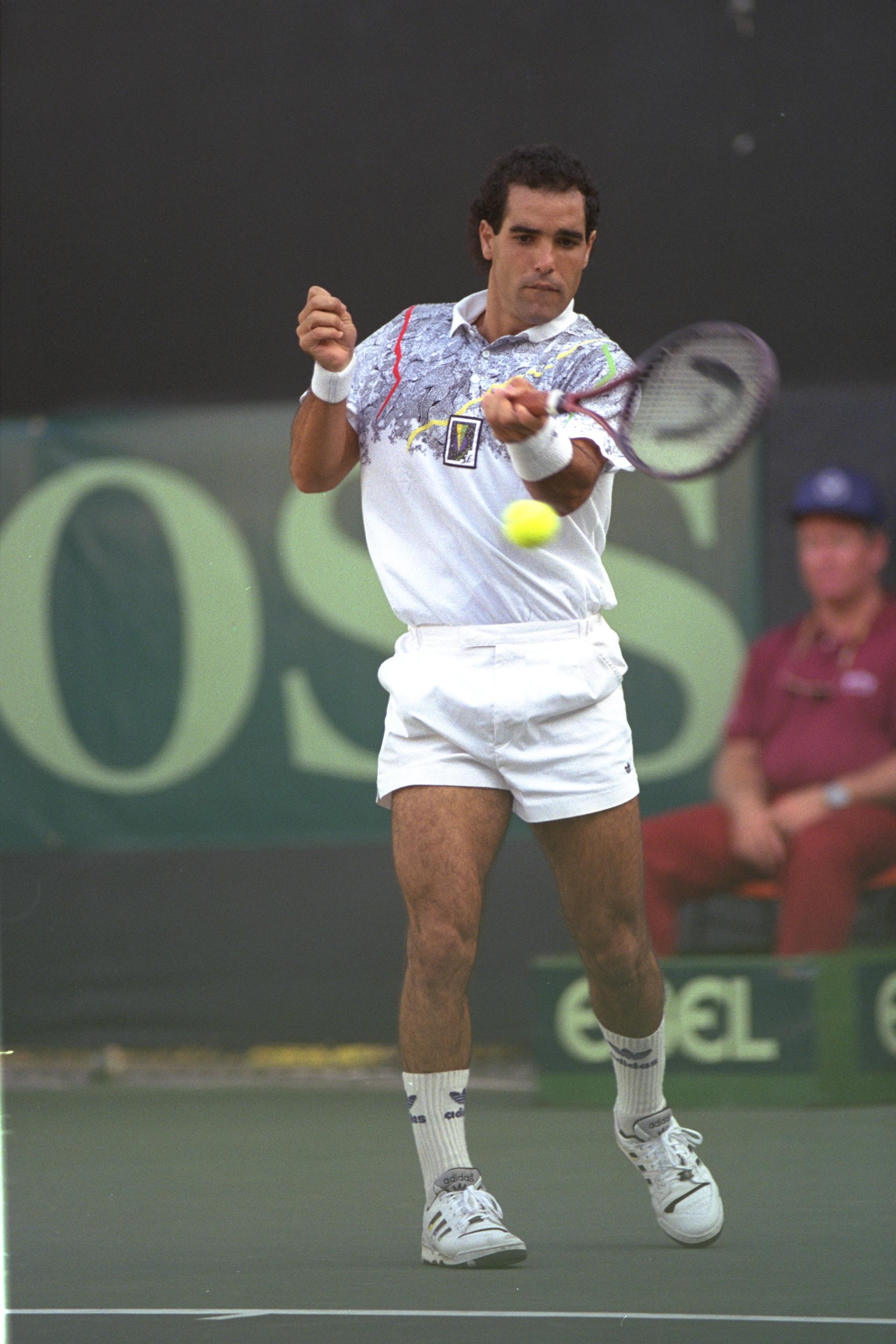
Gilad Bloom

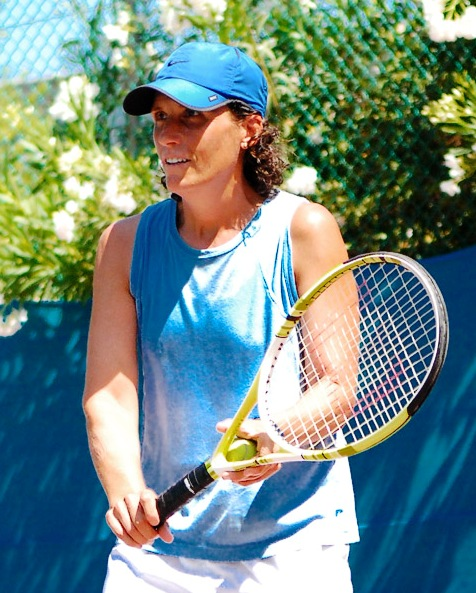
Ilana Berger

Event	Participant	Round	Result	Ref
Men's singles	Amos Mansdorf	First round	Defeated Jin-Sun Yoo (South Korea); 6-2, 6-4, 7-5	
Men's singles	Amos Mansdorf	Second round	Defeated Kelly Evernden (New Zealand); 6-4, 3-6, 6-1, 7-5	
Men's singles	Amos Mansdorf	Third round; 9th (tied)	Lost to Tim Mayotte (United States); 4-6, 2-6, 4-6	
Men's singles	Shahar Perkiss	First round	Lost to Javier Frana (Argentina); 2-6, 6-4, 4-6, 4-6	
Men's singles	Gilad Bloom	First round; 33rd	Lost to Jeremy Bates (Great Britain); 6-4, 4-6, 6-2, 2-6, 7-9	
Women's singles	Ilana Berger	First Round	Lost to Jill Hetherington (Canada); 1-6, 4-6	
Men's doubles	Gilad Bloom and Amos Mansdorf	9th (tied)		

=== Wrestling ===
Event	Participant	Result	Ref
Men's Greco-Roman 90 kg	Evan Bernstein		
Men's Greco-Roman 48 kg	Dov Groverman		
