= Meziane Dahmani =

Algerian judoka (born 1965)

Personal information
- Nationality: Algerian
- Born: 2 February 1965 (age 60)
- Occupation: Judoka

Sport
- Sport: Judo

Profile at external databases
- IJF: 3914
- JudoInside.com: 10725

Meziane Dahmani (born 2 February 1965) is an Algerian judoka. He competed at the 1988 Summer Olympics and the 1992 Summer Olympics.
