= Bertalan Hajtós =

Hungarian judoka (born 1965)

Personal information
- Born: 28 September 1965 (age 61)
- Occupation: Judoka

Sport
- Country: Hungary
- Sport: Judo
- Weight class: ‍–‍71 kg, ‍–‍81 kg

Achievements and titles
- Olympic Games: (silver) (1992)
- World Champ.: (silver) (1993)
- European Champ.: (gold) (1986, 1998)
Medal record
Men's judo
Representing Hungary
Olympic Games
Silver medal – second place	1992 Barcelona	‍–‍71 kg
World Championships
Silver medal – second place	1993 Hamilton	‍–‍71 kg
European Championships
Gold medal – first place	1986 Belgrade	‍–‍71 kg
Gold medal – first place	1998 Oviedo	‍–‍81 kg
Silver medal – second place	1985 Hamar	‍–‍71 kg
Silver medal – second place	1989 Helsinki	‍–‍71 kg
Bronze medal – third place	1990 Frankfurt	‍–‍71 kg
Bronze medal – third place	1994 Gdansk	‍–‍71 kg
European Junior Championships
Silver medal – second place	1985 Delemont	‍–‍71 kg
Bronze medal – third place	1984 Cadiz	‍–‍71 kg

Profile at external databases
- IJF: 18336
- JudoInside.com: 2697
- Updated on 5 June 2023

Bertalan Hajtós (born 28 September 1965 in Miskolc) is a Hungarian judoka. He competed at the 1988, 1992 and the 1996 Summer Olympics.

== Achievements ==
Year	Tournament	Place	Weight class
1998	European Judo Championships	1st	Half middleweight (81 kg)
1997	European Judo Championships	7th	Half middleweight (78 kg)
1994	European Judo Championships	3rd	Lightweight (71 kg)
1993	World Judo Championships	2nd	Lightweight (71 kg)
1992	Olympic Games	2nd	Lightweight (71 kg)
1991	World Judo Championships	5th	Lightweight (71 kg)
1990	European Judo Championships	3rd	Lightweight (71 kg)
1990	Goodwill Games	3rd	Lightweight (71 kg)
1989	World Judo Championships	5th	Lightweight (71 kg)
1989	European Judo Championships	2nd	Lightweight (71 kg)
1986	European Judo Championships	1st	Lightweight (71 kg)
1985	European Judo Championships	2nd	Lightweight (71 kg)
