= Sérgio Oliveira (judoka) =

Brazilian judoka (born 1967)

Personal information
- Born: 18 May 1967 (age 59) São Paulo, Brazil
- Occupation: Judoka

Sport
- Sport: Judo
Medal record
Representing Brazil
Pan American Games
Silver medal – second place	1991 Havana	Lightweight
Bronze medal – third place	1995 Mar del Plata	Lightweight

Profile at external databases
- JudoInside.com: 710

Sérgio Ricardo Souza Oliveira (born 18 May 1967) is a Brazilian judoka. He competed in the men's lightweight event at the 1992 Summer Olympics.
