= Oleg Kutscherenko =

Ukrainian-German wrestler

Medal record

Men's Greco-Roman wrestling

Representing the Unified Team

Olympic Games
Gold medal – first place	1992 Barcelona	48 kg

Representing the Soviet Union

World Championships
Gold medal – first place	1989 Martigny	48 kg
Gold medal – first place	1990 Ostia	48 kg

European Championships

Representing the Soviet Union
Silver medal – second place	1990 Poznań	52 kg
Bronze medal – third place	1989 Oulu	48 kg

Representing Germany
Bronze medal – third place	1995 Besançon	48 kg

Oleh Mykolaiovych Kucherenko (Ukrainian: Олег Миколайович Кучеренко; born December 20, 1968), also known as Oleg Kutscherenko, is a Ukrainian and German wrestler, born in Krasnyi Luch, Luhansk Oblast, Ukrainian SSR, Soviet Union (now Khrustalnyi, Ukraine). The Ensign of the Reserves Oleh Kucherenko represented the Ukrainian Armed Forces. He won an Olympic gold medal in Greco-Roman wrestling in 1992, competing for the Unified Team and the Ukrainian Armed Forces. He became the first Olympian for whom was raised the Ukrainian national flag and sounded the Ukrainian state anthem.

He competed for Germany at the 1996 Olympics.
