= Jiang Wei (wrestler) =

Chinese wrestler

Personal information
- Nationality: Chinese
- Born: 24 May 1971 (age 55)

Sport
- Sport: Wrestling

Jiang Wei (born 24 May 1971) is a Chinese wrestler. He competed in the men's Greco-Roman 48 kg at the 1992 Summer Olympics.
