= Alaoui Mohamed Taher =

Djiboutian judoka (born 1971)

Personal information
- Born: 15 July 1971 (age 54)
- Occupation: Judoka

Sport
- Sport: Judo

Profile at external databases
- JudoInside.com: 50856

Alaoui Mohamed Taher (born 15 July 1971) is a Djiboutian judoka.

Taher competed at the 1992 Summer Olympics held in Barcelona, he entered the lightweight class and after receiving a bye in the first round he was beaten by Israeli judoka Oren Smadja, so he didn't advance any further.
