= Edgardo Antinori =

Argentine judoka (born 1969)

Personal information
- Born: 22 December 1969 (age 55) Rosario, Argentina

Sport
- Sport: Judo

Edgardo Antinori (born 22 December 1969) is an Argentine judoka. He competed in the men's lightweight event at the 1992 Summer Olympics.
