= Gao Wenhe =

Chinese wrestler (born 1961)

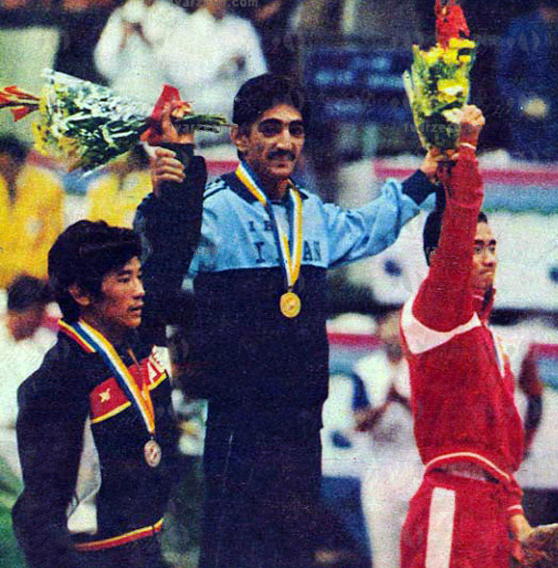
- Gao (left) at the 1986 Asian Games

Personal information
- Born: April 8, 1961 (age 65)
- Height: 154 cm (5 ft 1 in)

Sport
- Sport: Freestyle wrestling
- Coached by: Jin Nag
Medal record
Representing China
Asian Games
Silver medal – second place	1986 Seoul	-48 kg

Gao Wenhe (Chinese: 高文和; born April 8, 1961) is a retired Chinese light-flyweight freestyle wrestler. He won a silver medal at the 1986 Asian Games and placed fourth at the 1984 Summer Olympics.
