= Mynor Ramírez =

Guatemalan wrestler

Personal information
- Born: 25 July 1972 (age 53)

Sport
- Sport: Wrestling
Medal record
Representing Guatemala
Central American and Caribbean Games
Bronze medal – third place	1993 Ponce	Freestyle -48kg

Mynor Ramirez Fuentes (born 25 July 1972) is a Guatemalan former wrestler who competed in the 1992 Summer Olympics and in the 1996 Summer Olympics as well as the 1991 and 1995 Pan American Games.
