= Mahaddin Allahverdiyev =

Soviet wrestler

Medal record

Men's Greco-Roman wrestling

Representing the Soviet Union

World Championships
Gold medal – first place	1980 Bishkek-Furunze	48 kg
Gold medal – first place	1981 Russia Leningrad	48 kg
Silver medal – second place	1981 Canada Vancouver	48 kg
Gold medal – first place	1981 Russia Kirov	48 kg
Gold medal – first place	1982 Ukraine Donetsk	48 kg
Gold medal – first place	1982 Russia Irkutsk	48 kg
Bronze medal – third place	1982 Germany	48 kg
Gold medal – first place	1983 Greece Thessaloiniki	48 kg
Bronze medal – third place	1983 Russia Moscow	48 kg
Gold medal – first place	1983 Belarus Minsk	48 kg
Silver medal – second place	1984 Belarus Minsk	48 kg
Gold medal – first place	1984 Sweden Jönköping	48 kg
Gold medal – first place	1984 Finland	48 kg
Gold medal – first place	1985 Russia Krasnoyarsk	48 kg
Gold medal – first place	1985 Norway Kolbotn	48 kg
Gold medal – first place	1986 Budapest	48 kg

World Cup
Gold medal – first place	1987 France	48 kg 1987 - World Championship (France - (Glermon - Fegan)) - (gold medal) 1st place;

World Cup
Gold medal – first place	1987 Albany	48 kg

World Cup
Gold medal – first place	2006 Latvia-Riga	58 kg

Mahaddin Allahverdiyev (Azerbaijani: Məhəddin Allahverdiyev; commonly known as "Misha" was born 8 May 1962 in Sumqayit, Soviet Union) is a former Greco-Roman wrestler for the Soviet Union of Azerbaijani descent.

== Personal life ==
He was brought up by the Central Army Sports Club (Moscow). He is an honored master of sports of the USSR. He is a reserve Soviet officer. His coach (1980-1990) was the head coach of the USSR, the two-time world champion, the honored master of sports of the USSR, the honored coach of the USSR Mr. Sapunov Gennady Andreyevich. He graduated from the Leningrad Military Institute in 1982-1984 (was awarded the rank of army officer by order of the USSR Minister of Defense). In 1981-1986 he graduated from the coaching faculty at the Baku Sports Academy. In March 1986, at the closing of the XXVII Congress of the Soviet Communist Party in Moscow, he became the first flag bearer of Azerbaijan during the USSR. In November 1987, at the Greco-Roman Wrestling World Cup in Albany, USA, he was awarded the title of the most technical wrestler in the world and the biggest prize of the competition. He graduated from the law faculty of Baku State University in 1988–1993. In 1988, at the age of 26, he left the sport voluntarily due to an injury(ruptured groin) that he received on the eve of the Summer Olympics. In 1992-1993 he served as Minister of Sports of the Republic of Azerbaijan, in 1992-1997 as President of the National Olympic Committee of the Republic of Azerbaijan. He trained in "CSKA Moscow" sports societies in Moscow, Russia. Looking back from 1992 to 1997, he was the first ever President of the National Olympic Committee of Azerbaijan. He was awarded the title of European champion, 6 times World Cup (three individual, three team), 3 times USSR Cup winner, USSR champion, 4th Olympic medalist and honored coach of the Republic of Azerbaijan. He is married and has two children.

== Accomplishments ==
· 1980 - USSR Cup (Bishkek - Furunze) - 1st place (personal account);

· 1981 - USSR Youth Championship (18–20 years old) (Russia - Leningrad) - 1st place;

· 1981 - World Youth Championship (18–20 years old) (Canada - Vancouver) - 2nd place;

· 1981 - USSR Cup (Russia - Kirov) - 1st place (personal account);

· 1982 - USSR Cup (Ukraine - Donetsk) - 1st place (personal account);

· 1982 - USSR Youth Championship (18–20 years old) (Russia - Irkutsk) - 1st place;

· 1982 - European Youth Championship (18–20 years old) (Germany - Leinchik) - 3rd place;

· 1983 - World Cup (Greece - Thessaloniki) - 2 gold medals (individual and team);

· 1983 - Spartakiad of the peoples of the USSR (Russia - Moscow) - bronze medal:

· 1984 - USSR Military Championship (Belarus - Minsk) - 1st place;

· 1984 - USSR Championship (Belarus - Minsk) - 2nd place;

· 1984 - European Championship (Sweden - Jönköping) - 1st place with a record score (60: 0);

· 1984 - World Cup (Finland - Suonenyoki) - 2 gold medals (individual and team);

· 1985 - USSR Championship (Russia - Krasnoyarsk) - 1st place;

· 1985 - World Championship (Norway - Kolbotn) - 1st place;

· 1986 - World Championship (Budapest, Hungary) - (with a great advantage) 1st place;

· 1987 - World Championship (France - (Glermon - Fegan)) - (gold medal) 1st place;

· 1987 - World Cup (USA - Albany) - 2 gold medals (individual and team);

· 1988 - XXIV Summer Olympic Games - 4th place (due to a ruptured groin)

. 2006 - World Championship (40–45 years old) (Latvia-Riga) - 1st place world champion.
