= Jukka-Pekka Tanner =

Finnish wrestler

Jukka-Pekka Tanner (born 24 April 1963 in Tampere) is a Finnish former wrestler who competed in the 1984 Summer Olympics.
