= Ikuzo Saito =

Japanese wrestler (born 1960)

Medal record

Men's Greco-Roman wrestling

Representing Japan

Olympic Games
Bronze medal – third place	1984 Los Angeles	light flyweight

Ikuzo Saito (斎藤 育造, Saitō Ikuzō; born 11 August 1960 in Matsusaka, Mie) is a Japanese former wrestler who competed in the 1984 Summer Olympics and in the 1988 Summer Olympics.
