= Iliuță Dăscălescu =

Romanian wrestler

Personal information
- Nationality: Romanian
- Born: 15 July 1972 (age 54) Roman, Romania

Sport
- Sport: Wrestling

Iliuță Dăscălescu (born 15 July 1972) is a Romanian wrestler. He competed in the men's Greco-Roman 48 kg at the 1992 Summer Olympics.
