= Salih Bora =

Turkish sport wrestler (born 1953)

Personal information
- Nationality: Turkish
- Born: 23 August 1953 (age 72) Giresun, Turkey
- Home town: Giresun, Turkey
- Height: 1.51 m (4 ft 11 in)
- Weight: 48 kg (106 lb)

Sport
- Country: Turkey
- Sport: Wrestling
- Event: Greco-Roman
Medal record
Men's Greco-Roman wrestling
Representing Turkey
World Championships
Silver medal – second place	1982 Katowice	48 kg
Silver medal – second place	1981 Oslo	48 kg
Silver medal – second place	1977 Gothenburg	48 kg
European Championships
Bronze medal – third place	1981 Gothenburg	48 kg
Mediterranean Games
Bronze medal – third place	1983 Casablanca	48 kg
Gold medal – first place	1979 Split	48 kg
Gold medal – first place	1975 Algiers	48 kg

Salih Bora (born 23 August 1953) is a Turkish former wrestler who competed in the 1976 Summer Olympics and in the 1984 Summer Olympics.
