= Eldad Amir =

Israeli sailor

Personal information
- Native name: אלדד אמיר
- Nationality: Israel
- Born: September 28, 1961 (age 64) Hadera, Israel
- Height: 6 ft 2.5 in (189 cm)
- Weight: 207 lb (94 kg)

Sailing career
- Sport: Sailing
- Class: Mixed Two-Person Heavyweight Dinghy

Eldad Amir (Hebrew: אלדד אמיר; born September 28, 1961) is an Israeli Olympic competitive sailor. He was born in Hadera, Israel, and is Jewish.

== Sailing career ==
When Amir competed in the Olympics he was 6 ft 2.5 in (189 cm) tall, and weighed 207 lb (94 kg).

Amir competed for Israel at the 1984 Summer Olympics with Yoel Sela, at the age of 22, in Los Angeles, California, in Sailing - Mixed Two Person Heavyweight Dinghy, and came in 8th.

Amir competed for Israel at the 1988 Summer Olympics with Yoel Sela, at the age of 26, in Seoul, Korea, in Sailing - Mixed Two Person Heavyweight Dinghy, and came in 4th. They came very close to winning the first Olympic medal in Israeli history, missing one by 11.30 points. Their second race fell on Yom Kippur, and Israeli officials forbade them from competing that day, so they had missed that race. Had they been able to compete in the second race, they would have certainly medaled.

In 1990, Amir and Sela came in 5th in the World Championships. In 1991, they won the Italian Open and came in second in the France Open.

At the 1992 Summer Olympics, Amir carried the Israeli flag at opening ceremony. He competed with Yoel Sela, at the age of 30, in Sailing - Mixed Two Person Heavyweight Dinghy, and came in 20th.
