= Jun Dae-je =

South Korean wrestler (born 1965)

Jun Dae-Je (born 5 August 1965) is a Korean former wrestler who competed in the 1984 Summer Olympics.
