= Andrzej Głąb =

Polish wrestler (born 1966)

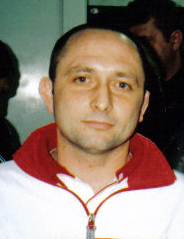

Medal record

Men's Greco-Roman wrestling

Representing Poland

Olympic Games
Silver medal – second place	1988 Seoul	48 kg

Andrzej Głąb (born 10 November 1966 in Chełm) is a Polish wrestler who competed in the 1988 Summer Olympics. He won a silver medal at the 1988 Summer Olympics in wrestling in the 48 kg category (light-flyweight).
