= Ömer Elmas =

Turkish wrestler

Ömer Elmas (born November 30, 1968, or January 1, 1969) is a Turkish wrestler.

He competed for Turkey at the 1992 Summer Olympics, at the age of 23, in Barcelona, in Greco-Roman Wrestling - Men's Light-Flyweight. He lost to Nik Zagranitchni of Israel by decision in the first round, and to Wilber Sánchez of Cuba by decision in the second round.
