= Bratan Tsenov =

Bulgarian wrestler (born 1964)

Medal record

Men's Greco-Roman wrestling

Representing Bulgaria

Olympic Games
Bronze medal – third place	1988 Seoul	48 kg

Bratan Tsenov (Bulgarian: Братан Ценов; born 7 January 1964) is a Bulgarian former wrestler who competed in the 1988 Summer Olympics, in the 1992 Summer Olympics, and in the 1996 Summer Olympics.
