= Oren Smadja =

Israeli judoka (born 1970)

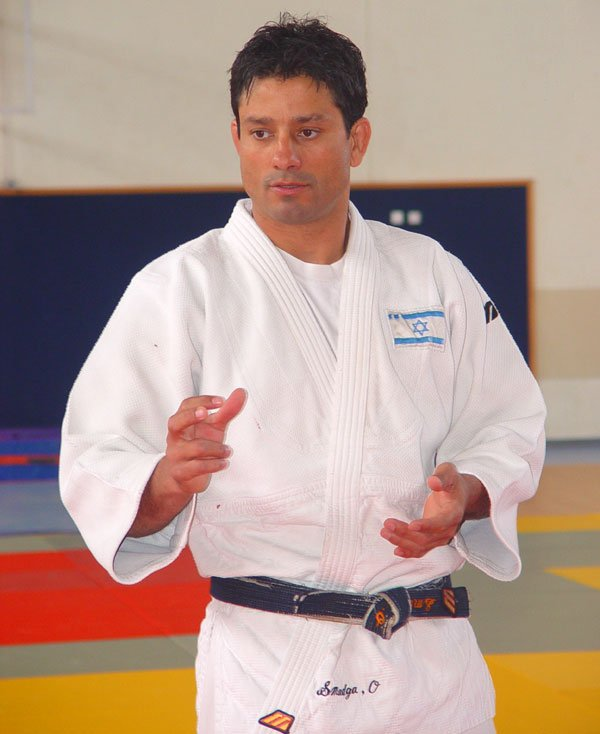

Personal information
- Native name: אורן סמדג'ה
- Nationality: Israeli
- Born: June 20, 1970 (age 56) Ofakim, Israel
- Occupation: Judo coach

Sport
- Country: Israel
- Sport: Judo
- Weight class: –‍71 kg, –‍78 kg
- Rank: 7th dan black belt
- Now coaching: Israel national judo team

Achievements and titles
- Olympic Games: (bronze) (1992)
- World Champ.: (silver) (1995)
- European Champ.: (bronze) (1992)
Medal record
Men's judo
Representing Israel
Olympic Games
Bronze medal – third place	1992 Barcelona	‍–‍71 kg
World Championships
Silver medal – second place	1995 Chiba	‍–‍78 kg
European Championships
Bronze medal – third place	1992 Paris	‍–‍71 kg
World Juniors Championships
Silver medal – second place	1990 Dijon	‍–‍71 kg
European Junior Championships
Bronze medal – third place	1990 Ankara	‍–‍71 kg

Profile at external databases
- IJF: 53539
- JudoInside.com: 2767
- Updated on 5 June 2023

Shay-Oren Smadja (Hebrew: אורן סמדג'ה; born 20 June 1970) is an Israeli judo coach and former competitive judoka. Smadja won an Olympic bronze medal in judo at the 1992 Summer Olympics, making him the first Israeli male to win an Olympic medal, and the second Israeli overall after Yael Arad who won silver in judo the day before.

== Judo career ==
Smadja won an Olympic bronze medal in judo at the 1992 Summer Olympics in the under 71 kg category. In 1995, he won a silver medal at the 1995 World Championships. The next year, he could not repeat his Olympic success when participating at the 1996 Summer Olympics.

Smadja was nominated as the national coach of the Israeli men's judo team in 2010.

Smadja coached several Israeli judokas including Or Sasson, winner of the bronze medal in the 2016 Summer Olympics (men's +100 kg); Sagi Muki, who won gold medals at the 2015 European Games (men's 73 kg) and the 2019 World Championships in Tokyo (men's 81 kg); Peter Paltchik, winner of the bronze medal in the 2024 Summer Olympics (men's 100 kg).

Smadja is the first Israeli man to win an Olympic medal both as an athlete and as a coach.

== Personal life ==
Smadja was born in Ofakim, Israel, to a family of Tunisian Jewish descent. He is married to Liat, and the couple had two sons and a daughter. They live in Ganot Hadar.

In 2008, Smadja competed in the 4th season of Israel's Rokdim Im Kokhavim ('Dancing with the Stars'), where he was eliminated 3rd (out of 12 couples).

In 2024, on his birthday his son Omer, a reservist soldier in the Israel Defense Forces, fought and fell in action in the Gaza Strip during the Gaza war. When one month later Israeli judoka Peter Paltchik won a medal at the 2024 Paris Olympics, he dedicated it to Smadja’s son.

In 2025, Smadja was honored as one of the torchbearers in the national Israeli Independence Day ceremony.

== Achievements ==
Year	Tournament	Place	Weight class	Ref.
1990	World Juniors Championships	2nd place, silver medalist(s)	Lightweight (71 kg)	
1992	Olympic Games	3rd place, bronze medalist(s)	Lightweight (71 kg)	
1992	European Judo Championships	3rd place, bronze medalist(s)	Lightweight (71 kg)	
1995	World Judo Championships	2nd place, silver medalist(s)	Half middleweight (78 kg)	
1995	European Judo Championships	7th	Half middleweight (78 kg)	

== See also ==
- List of select Jewish judokas
