= Markus Scherer =

German wrestler (born 1962)

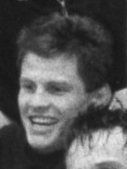
- Markus Scherer in 1988

Medal record

Men's Greco-Roman wrestling

Representing West Germany

Olympic Games
Silver medal – second place	1984 Los Angeles	light-flyweight

Markus Scherer (born 20 June 1962 in Ludwigshafen am Rhein) is a German former wrestler who competed in the 1984 Summer Olympics and in the 1988 Summer Olympics.
