= Goun Duk-yong =

South Korean Greco-Roman wrestler

Medal record

Representing South Korea

Men's Greco-Roman wrestling

World Championships
Gold medal – first place	1991 Varna	48 kg
Bronze medal – third place	1989 Martigny	48 kg

Asian Games
Gold medal – first place	1990 Beijing	48 kg

Goun Duk-Yong (Korean: 권덕용; Hanja: 權德龍; born August 29, 1962, in Jeonju, North Jeolla Province) is a retired South Korean Greco-Roman wrestler.
