= Abdel Malek El-Aouad =

Moroccan wrestler

Personal information
- Nationality: Moroccan
- Born: 23 April 1960 (age 64)

Sport
- Sport: Wrestling

Abdel Malek El-Aouad (born 23 April 1960) is a Moroccan former wrestler. He competed at the 1984 Summer Olympics and the 1992 Summer Olympics.
