= Massimo Sulli =

Italian judoka (born 1963)

Massimo Sulli (born December 12, 1963) is an Italian former Olympic judoka.

== Judo career ==
His sports club was G.S. Fiamme Gialle, in Rome, Italy.

Competing in the U71 weight class, Sulli won the 1983-91 Italian Judo Championships.

Sulli competed for Italy at the 1992 Summer Olympics in Barcelona, at the age of 28, in Judo--Men's Lightweight, and came in tied for 9th.
