= Stefan Dott =

German judoka (born 1969)

Personal information
- Born: 27 September 1969 (age 55)
- Occupation: Judoka

Sport
- Sport: Judo

Profile at external databases
- JudoInside.com: 2114

Stefan Dott (born 27 September 1969 in Koblenz, Rheinland-Pfalz) is a German judoka and former European Champion. He is now executive officer of SAUBER ENERGIE (provider of renewable energy), and authorised representative of the power provider Rhenag. Dott lives in Frechen, near Cologne.

Year	Tournament	Place	Weight class
1996	Olympic Games	5th	Half middleweight (78 kg)
1994	European Judo Championships	5th	Half middleweight (78 kg)
1992	Olympic Games	5th	Lightweight (71 kg)
1991	European Judo Championships	1st	Lightweight (71 kg)
