= Wilber Sánchez (wrestler) =

Cuban wrestler (born 1968)

Personal information
- Born: 21 December 1968 (age 57) Santiago de Cuba, Cuba

Sport
- Sport: Wrestling
Medal record
Men's Greco-Roman wrestling
Representing Cuba
Olympic Games
Bronze medal – third place	1992 Barcelona	48 kg
World Championships
Gold medal – first place	1993 Stockholm	Light flyweight
Gold medal – first place	1994 Tampere	Light flyweight
Pan American Games
Bronze medal – third place	1995 Mar del Plata	48 kg

Wilber Sánchez Amita (born 21 December 1968) is a Cuban former wrestler who competed in the 1992 Summer Olympics and in the 1996 Summer Olympics.
