= József Faragó =

Hungarian wrestler

Personal information
- Nationality: Hungarian
- Born: 8 July 1966 (age 58); Eger, Hungary

Sport
- Sport: Wrestling

József Faragó (born 8 July 1966) is a Hungarian wrestler. He competed at the 1988 Summer Olympics and the 1992 Summer Olympics.
