= Kent Andersson (wrestler) =

Swedish wrestler

Personal information
- Nationality: Swedish
- Born: 24 October 1959 (age 67) Stockholm, Sweden

Sport
- Sport: Wrestling

Kent Andersson (born 24 October 1959) is a Swedish wrestler. He competed at the 1980 Summer Olympics and the 1984 Summer Olympics.
