= Mark Fuller (wrestler) =

American Greco-Roman wrestler (born 1961)

Personal information
- Born: Mark Albert Fuller; March 25, 1961 (age 65) Roseville, California, U.S.
- Home town: Lincoln, California, U.S.

Sport
- Country: United States
- Sport: Wrestling
- Event: Greco-Roman
- College team: BYU
- Club: Sunkist Kids Wrestling Club
- Team: USA
Medal record
Men's Greco-Roman wrestling
Representing the United States
Pan American Games
| Gold medal – first place | 1991 Havana | 48 kg |
| Silver medal – second place | 1983 Caracas | 52 kg |
Pan American Championships
| Bronze medal – third place | 1988 Mexico City | 52 kg |
Junior World Championships
| Gold medal – first place | 1979 Haparanda | 48 kg |
| Gold medal – first place | 1981 Vancouver | 48 kg |

Mark Albert Fuller (born March 25, 1961) was an American wrestler in Greco-Roman wrestling.

== Wrestling career ==
A member of the Sunkids Kids Wrestling Club, Fuller competed on four different USA Olympic Greco-Roman wrestling teams (1980, 1984, 1988 and 1992) and was the first American wrestler to make four Olympic teams. He would have competed at the 1980 Summer Olympics, but was prevented by the United States boycott of the event. He came in second in the 1983 Pan American Games competition and first at the 1991 Pan American Games. Fuller was also a two-time World Champion at the World Junior Wrestling Championships.

== Personal life ==
Fuller is a Latter-day Saint. He is married to Heidi Fuller and is the father of four children.

== Sources ==
- Mark Fuller at Olympics at Sports-Reference.com (archived)
- 2009 Deseret Morning News Church Almanac (Salt Lake City, Utah: Deseret Morning News, 2008) p. 326.
