= List of World Championships medalists in wrestling (Greco-Roman) =

World medalists

This is the List of World Championships medalists in men's Greco-Roman wrestling.

== Light flyweight ==
- 48 kg: 1969–1995

Games	Gold	Silver	Bronze
1969 Mar del Plata	Gheorghe Berceanu (ROM)	Rahim Aliabadi (IRN)	Vladislav Kustov (URS)
1970 Edmonton	Gheorghe Berceanu (ROM)	Vladimir Zubkov (URS)	Bernard Szczepański (POL)
1971 Sofia	Vladimir Zubkov (URS)	Hızır Sarı (TUR)	Stefan Angelov (BUL)
1973 Tehran	Vladimir Zubkov (URS)	Ryszard Świerad (POL)	Ferenc Seres (HUN)
1974 Katowice	Vladimir Zubkov (URS)	Constantin Alexandru (ROM)	Georgi Georgiev (BUL)
1975 Minsk	Vladimir Zubkov (URS)	Gheorghe Berceanu (ROM)	Stefan Angelov (BUL)
1977 Gothenburg	Aleksey Shumakov (URS)	Salih Bora (TUR)	Todor Genchev (BUL)
1978 Mexico City	Constantin Alexandru (ROM)	Aleksey Shumakov (URS)	Roman Kierpacz (POL)
1979 San Diego	Constantin Alexandru (ROM)	Aleksey Shumakov (URS)	Pavel Hristov (BUL)
1981 Oslo	Zhaksylyk Ushkempirov (URS)	Salih Bora (TUR)	Fumikazu Sasaki (JPN)
1982 Katowice	Temo Kasarashvili (URS)	Salih Bora (TUR)	Bratan Tsenov (BUL)
1983 Kyiv	Bratan Tsenov (BUL)	Markus Scherer (FRG)	Temo Kasarashvili (URS)
1985 Kolbotn	Mahaddin Allahverdiyev (URS)	Bratan Tsenov (BUL)	Csaba Vadász (HUN)
1986 Budapest	Mahaddin Allahverdiyev (URS)	Bratan Tsenov (BUL)	Reinaldo Jiménez (CUB)
1987 Clermont-Ferrand	Mahaddin Allahverdiyev (URS)	Vincenzo Maenza (ITA)	Lars Rønningen (NOR)
1989 Martigny	Oleg Kucherenko (URS)	Lars Rønningen (NOR)	Goun Duk-yong (KOR)
1990 Ostia	Oleg Kucherenko (URS)	Rayko Marinov (BUL)	Yasuichi Ebina (JPN)
1991 Varna	Goun Duk-yong (KOR)	Reza Simkhah (IRN)	Sergey Suvorov (URS)
1993 Stockholm	Wilber Sánchez (CUB)	Zafar Guliev (RUS)	Sim Kwon-ho (KOR)
1994 Tampere	Wilber Sánchez (CUB)	Aleksandr Pavlov (BLR)	Gela Papashvili (GEO)
1995 Prague	Sim Kwon-ho (KOR)	Hiroshi Kado (JPN)	Zafar Guliev (RUS)

== Flyweight ==
- 52 kg: 1950–1995
- 54 kg: 1997–2001
- 55 kg: 2018–

Games	Gold	Silver	Bronze
1950 Stockholm	Bengt Johansson (SWE)	Ali Yücel (TUR)	Mohamed El-Ward (EGY)
1953 Naples	Boris Gurevich (URS)	Ahmet Bilek (TUR)	Maurice Mewis (BEL)
1955 Karlsruhe	Ignazio Fabra (ITA)	Nail Garaev (URS)	Hüseyin Akbaş (TUR)
1958 Budapest	Boris Gurevich (URS)	Sándor Kerekes (HUN)	Borivoj Vukov (YUG)
1961 Yokohama	Armais Sayadov (URS)	Dumitru Pârvulescu (ROM)	Burhan Bozkurt (TUR)
1962 Toledo	Sergey Rybalko (URS)	Ignazio Fabra (ITA)	Burhan Bozkurt (TUR)
1963 Helsingborg	Borivoj Vukov (YUG)	Ignazio Fabra (ITA)	Sergey Rybalko (URS)
1965 Tampere	Sergey Rybalko (URS)	Rolf Lacour (FRG)	Angel Kerezov (BUL)
1966 Toledo	Angel Kerezov (BUL)	Sergey Rybalko (URS)	Rolf Lacour (FRG)
1967 Bucharest	Vladimir Bakulin (URS)	Cornel Turturea (ROM)	Imre Alker (HUN)
1969 Mar del Plata	Firouz Alizadeh (IRN)	Cornel Turturea (ROM)	Ivan Mikhailishin (URS)
1970 Edmonton	Petar Kirov (BUL)	Saburo Sugiyama (JPN)	Boško Marinko (YUG)
1971 Sofia	Petar Kirov (BUL)	Gheorghe Stoiciu (ROM)	József Doncsecz (HUN)
1973 Tehran	Nicu Gingă (ROM)	Jan Michalik (POL)	Rahim Aliabadi (IRN)
1974 Katowice	Petar Kirov (BUL)	Valery Arutyunov (URS)	Nicu Gingă (ROM)
1975 Minsk	Vitaly Konstantinov (URS)	Bilal Tabur (TUR)	Baek Seung-hyun (KOR)
1977 Gothenburg	Nicu Gingă (ROM)	Kamil Fatkulin (URS)	Morad Ali Shirani (IRN)
1978 Mexico City	Vakhtang Blagidze (URS)	Nicu Gingă (ROM)	Charalambos Cholidis (GRE)
1979 San Diego	Lajos Rácz (HUN)	Kamil Fatkulin (URS)	Toshio Asakura (JPN)
1981 Oslo	Vakhtang Blagidze (URS)	Atsuji Miyahara (JPN)	Lajos Rácz (HUN)
1982 Katowice	Benur Pashayan (URS)	Lyubomir Tsekov (BUL)	Bang Dae-du (KOR)
1983 Kyiv	Benur Pashayan (URS)	Erol Kemah (TUR)	Lyubomir Tsekov (BUL)
1985 Kolbotn	Jon Rønningen (NOR)	Minseit Tazetdinov (URS)	Mihai Cișmaș (ROM)
1986 Budapest	Sergey Dyudyaev (URS)	Jon Rønningen (NOR)	Atsuji Miyahara (JPN)
1987 Clermont-Ferrand	Pedro Roque (CUB)	Roman Kierpacz (POL)	Aleksandr Ignatenko (URS)
1989 Martigny	Aleksandr Ignatenko (URS)	Remzi Öztürk (TUR)	An Han-bong (KOR)
1990 Ostia	Aleksandr Ignatenko (URS)	An Han-bong (KOR)	Bratan Tsenov (BUL)
1991 Varna	Raúl Martínez (CUB)	Shawn Sheldon (USA)	Jon Rønningen (NOR)
1993 Stockholm	Raúl Martínez (CUB)	Armen Nazaryan (ARM)	Alfred Ter-Mkrtchyan (GER)
1994 Tampere	Alfred Ter-Mkrtchyan (GER)	Natig Eyvazov (AZE)	Andriy Kalashnikov (UKR)
1995 Prague	Samvel Danielyan (RUS)	Armen Nazaryan (ARM)	Alfred Ter-Mkrtchyan (GER)
1997 Wrocław	Ercan Yıldız (TUR)	Vahan Juharyan (ARM)	Alfred Ter-Mkrtchyan (GER)
1998 Gävle	Sim Kwon-ho (KOR)	Marian Sandu (ROM)	Khaled Al-Faraj (SYR)
1999 Athens	Lázaro Rivas (CUB)	Ha Tae-yeon (KOR)	Alfred Ter-Mkrtchyan (GER)
2001 Patras	Hassan Rangraz (IRI)	Brandon Paulson (USA)	Lázaro Rivas (CUB)
2018 Budapest	Eldaniz Azizli (AZE)	Zholaman Sharshenbekov (KGZ)	Nugzari Tsurtsumia (GEO)
2018 Budapest	Eldaniz Azizli (AZE)	Zholaman Sharshenbekov (KGZ)	Ekrem Öztürk (TUR)
2019 Nur-Sultan	Nugzari Tsurtsumia (GEO)	Khorlan Zhakansha (KAZ)	Eldaniz Azizli (AZE)
2019 Nur-Sultan	Nugzari Tsurtsumia (GEO)	Khorlan Zhakansha (KAZ)	Shota Ogawa (JPN)
2021 Oslo	Ken Matsui (JPN)	Emin Sefershaev (RWF)	Eldaniz Azizli (AZE)
2021 Oslo	Ken Matsui (JPN)	Emin Sefershaev (RWF)	Nugzari Tsurtsumia (GEO)
2022 Belgrade	Eldaniz Azizli (AZE)	Nugzari Tsurtsumia (GEO)	Yu Shiotani (JPN)
2022 Belgrade	Eldaniz Azizli (AZE)	Nugzari Tsurtsumia (GEO)	Jasurbek Ortikboev (UZB)
2023 Belgrade	Eldaniz Azizli (AZE)	Nugzari Tsurtsumia (GEO)	Pouya Dadmarz (IRI)
2023 Belgrade	Eldaniz Azizli (AZE)	Nugzari Tsurtsumia (GEO)	Jasurbek Ortikboev (UZB)
2024 Tirana	Eldaniz Azizli (AZE)	Pouya Dadmarz (IRI)	Emin Sefershaev (AIN)
2024 Tirana	Eldaniz Azizli (AZE)	Pouya Dadmarz (IRI)	Denis Mihai (ROU)
2025 Zagreb	Vakhtang Lolua (GEO)	Payam Ahmadi (IRI)	Eldaniz Azizli (AZE)
2025 Zagreb	Vakhtang Lolua (GEO)	Payam Ahmadi (IRI)	Shi Huoying (CHN)
2026 Astana	Eldaniz Azizli (AZE)	Payam Ahmadi (IRI)	Vakhtang Lolua (GEO)
2026 Astana	Eldaniz Azizli (AZE)	Payam Ahmadi (IRI)	Iskhar Kurbayev (KAZ)

== Bantamweight ==
- 58 kg: 1921–1922
- 57 kg: 1950–1995
- 58 kg: 1997–2001
- 55 kg: 2002–2013
- 59 kg: 2014–2017
- 60 kg: 2018–

Games	Gold	Silver	Bronze
1921 Helsinki	Väinö Ikonen (FIN)	Kaarlo Mäkinen (FIN)	Risto Mustonen (FIN)
1922 Stockholm	Fritiof Svensson (SWE)	Eduard Pütsep (EST)	Kaarlo Mäkinen (FIN)
1950 Stockholm	Mahmoud Hassan (EGY)	Halil Kaya (TUR)	Pietro Lombardi (ITA)
1953 Naples	Artem Teryan (URS)	Imre Hódos (HUN)	Giovanni Cocco (ITA)
1955 Karlsruhe	Vladimir Stashkevich (URS)	Yaşar Yılmaz (TUR)	Pietro Lombardi (ITA)
1958 Budapest	Oleg Karavaev (URS)	Yaşar Yılmaz (TUR)	Lothar Fischer (GDR)
1961 Yokohama	Oleg Karavaev (URS)	Ion Cernea (ROM)	Jiří Švec (TCH)
1962 Toledo	Masamitsu Ichiguchi (JPN)	Omari Egadze (URS)	Kamal El-Sayed Ali (UAR)
1963 Helsingborg	János Varga (HUN)	Jiří Švec (TCH)	Dinko Petrov (BUL)
1965 Tampere	Ion Cernea (ROM)	Fritz Stange (FRG)	Bernard Knitter (POL)
1966 Toledo	Fritz Stange (FRG)	Koji Sakurama (JPN)	Ünver Beşergil (TUR)
1967 Bucharest	Ion Baciu (ROM)	János Varga (HUN)	Tsutomu Hanahara (JPN)
1969 Mar del Plata	Rustam Kazakov (URS)	An Chun-young (KOR)	David Hazewinkel (USA)
1970 Edmonton	János Varga (HUN)	David Hazewinkel (USA)	Rustam Kazakov (URS)
1971 Sofia	Rustam Kazakov (URS)	Hristo Traykov (BUL)	János Varga (HUN)
1973 Tehran	Józef Lipień (POL)	Rustam Kazakov (URS)	Hristo Traykov (BUL)
1974 Katowice	Farhat Mustafin (URS)	Józef Lipień (POL)	Ivan Frgić (YUG)
1975 Minsk	Farhat Mustafin (URS)	Józef Lipień (POL)	Pertti Ukkola (FIN)
1977 Gothenburg	Pertti Ukkola (FIN)	Farhat Mustafin (URS)	Ivan Frgić (YUG)
1978 Mexico City	Shamil Serikov (URS)	Ivan Frgić (YUG)	Pasquale Passarelli (FRG)
1979 San Diego	Shamil Serikov (URS)	Kiwamu Kashiwagi (JPN)	Antonino Caltabiano (ITA)
1981 Oslo	Pasquale Passarelli (FRG)	Josef Krysta (TCH)	Ilpo Seppälä (FIN)
1982 Katowice	Piotr Michalik (POL)	Nicolae Zamfir (ROM)	Vasily Fomin (URS)
1983 Kyiv	Masaki Eto (JPN)	Kamil Fatkulin (URS)	Petar Balov (BUL)
1985 Kolbotn	Stoyan Balov (BUL)	Oganes Arutunyan (URS)	Amadoris González (CUB)
1986 Budapest	Emil Ivanov (BUL)	Timerzhan Kalimulin (URS)	Charalambos Cholidis (GRE)
1987 Clermont-Ferrand	Patrice Mourier (FRA)	Rıfat Yıldız (FRG)	Keijo Pehkonen (FIN)
1989 Martigny	Emil Ivanov (BUL)	Aleksandr Shestakov (URS)	András Sike (HUN)
1990 Ostia	Rıfat Yıldız (GER)	Aleksandr Shestakov (URS)	Patrice Mourier (FRA)
1991 Varna	Rıfat Yıldız (GER)	Aleksandr Ignatenko (URS)	András Sike (HUN)
1993 Stockholm	Aghasi Manukyan (ARM)	Aleksandr Ignatenko (RUS)	Mikael Lindgren (FIN)
1994 Tampere	Yuriy Melnichenko (KAZ)	Aleksandr Ignatenko (RUS)	Dennis Hall (USA)
1995 Prague	Dennis Hall (USA)	Yuriy Melnichenko (KAZ)	Aleksandr Ignatenko (RUS)
1997 Wrocław	Yuriy Melnichenko (KAZ)	Rafik Simonyan (RUS)	Armen Nazaryan (BUL)
1998 Gävle	Kim In-sub (KOR)	Sheng Zetian (CHN)	Armen Nazaryan (BUL)
1999 Athens	Kim In-sub (KOR)	Yuriy Melnichenko (KAZ)	Armen Nazaryan (BUL)
2001 Patras	Dilshod Aripov (UZB)	Karen Mnatsakanyan (ARM)	Roberto Monzón (CUB)
2002 Moscow	Geidar Mamedaliyev (RUS)	Nepes Gukulow (TKM)	Hassan Rangraz (IRI)
2003 Créteil	Dariusz Jabłoński (POL)	Im Dae-won (KOR)	Lázaro Rivas (CUB)
2005 Budapest	Hamid Sourian (IRI)	Park Eun-chul (KOR)	István Majoros (HUN)
2005 Budapest	Hamid Sourian (IRI)	Park Eun-chul (KOR)	Yermek Kuketov (KAZ)
2006 Guangzhou	Hamid Sourian (IRI)	Rovshan Bayramov (AZE)	Park Eun-chul (KOR)
2006 Guangzhou	Hamid Sourian (IRI)	Rovshan Bayramov (AZE)	Lindsey Durlacher (USA)
2007 Baku	Hamid Sourian (IRI)	Park Eun-chul (KOR)	Nazyr Mankiev (RUS)
2007 Baku	Hamid Sourian (IRI)	Park Eun-chul (KOR)	Kristijan Fris (SRB)
2009 Herning	Hamid Sourian (IRI)	Roman Amoyan (ARM)	Rovshan Bayramov (AZE)
2009 Herning	Hamid Sourian (IRI)	Roman Amoyan (ARM)	Håkan Nyblom (DEN)
2010 Moscow	Hamid Sourian (IRI)	Choi Gyu-jin (KOR)	Roman Amoyan (ARM)
2010 Moscow	Hamid Sourian (IRI)	Choi Gyu-jin (KOR)	Nazyr Mankiev (RUS)
2011 Istanbul	Rovshan Bayramov (AZE)	Elbek Tazhyieu (BLR)	Li Shujin (CHN)
2011 Istanbul	Rovshan Bayramov (AZE)	Elbek Tazhyieu (BLR)	Bekkhan Mankiev (RUS)
2013 Budapest	Yun Won-chol (PRK)	Choi Gyu-jin (KOR)	Roman Amoyan (ARM)
2013 Budapest	Yun Won-chol (PRK)	Choi Gyu-jin (KOR)	Péter Módos (HUN)
2014 Tashkent	Hamid Sourian (IRI)	Mingiyan Semenov (RUS)	Stig-André Berge (NOR)
2014 Tashkent	Hamid Sourian (IRI)	Mingiyan Semenov (RUS)	Elmurat Tasmuradov (UZB)
2015 Las Vegas	Ismael Borrero (CUB)	Rovshan Bayramov (AZE)	Almat Kebispayev (KAZ)
2015 Las Vegas	Ismael Borrero (CUB)	Rovshan Bayramov (AZE)	Yun Won-chol (PRK)
2017 Paris	Kenichiro Fumita (JPN)	Meirambek Ainagulov (KAZ)	Kim Seung-hak (KOR)
2017 Paris	Kenichiro Fumita (JPN)	Meirambek Ainagulov (KAZ)	Stepan Maryanyan (RUS)
2018 Budapest	Sergey Emelin (RUS)	Victor Ciobanu (MDA)	Walihan Sailike (CHN)
2018 Budapest	Sergey Emelin (RUS)	Victor Ciobanu (MDA)	Aidos Sultangali (KAZ)
2019 Nur-Sultan	Kenichiro Fumita (JPN)	Sergey Emelin (RUS)	Alireza Nejati (IRI)
2019 Nur-Sultan	Kenichiro Fumita (JPN)	Sergey Emelin (RUS)	Meirambek Ainagulov (KAZ)
2021 Oslo	Victor Ciobanu (MDA)	Zholaman Sharshenbekov (KGZ)	Murad Mammadov (AZE)
2021 Oslo	Victor Ciobanu (MDA)	Zholaman Sharshenbekov (KGZ)	Stepan Maryanyan (RWF)
2022 Belgrade	Zholaman Sharshenbekov (KGZ)	Edmond Nazaryan (BUL)	Kenichiro Fumita (JPN)
2022 Belgrade	Zholaman Sharshenbekov (KGZ)	Edmond Nazaryan (BUL)	Aidos Sultangali (KAZ)
2023 Belgrade	Zholaman Sharshenbekov (KGZ)	Kenichiro Fumita (JPN)	Cao Liguo (CHN)
2023 Belgrade	Zholaman Sharshenbekov (KGZ)	Kenichiro Fumita (JPN)	Islomjon Bakhromov (UZB)
2025 Zagreb	Aidos Sultangali (KAZ)	Alisher Ganiev (UZB)	Hrachya Poghosyan (ARM)
2025 Zagreb	Aidos Sultangali (KAZ)	Alisher Ganiev (UZB)	Ri Se-ung (PRK)
2026 Astana	Koto Gomi (JPN)	Ali Ahmadi Vafa (IRI)	Aidos Sultangali (KAZ)
2026 Astana	Koto Gomi (JPN)	Ali Ahmadi Vafa (IRI)	Alisher Ganiev (UZB)

== Featherweight ==
- 62 kg: 1921–1961
- 63 kg: 1962–1967
- 62 kg: 1969–1995
- 63 kg: 1997–2001
- 60 kg: 2002–2013
- 63 kg: 2018–

Games	Gold	Silver	Bronze
1921 Helsinki	Kalle Anttila (FIN)	Aleksanteri Toivola (FIN)	Erik Malmberg (SWE)
1922 Stockholm	Kalle Anttila (FIN)	Martin Egeberg (NOR)	Otto Boesen (DEN)
1950 Stockholm	Olle Anderberg (SWE)	Safi Taha (LIB)	El-Sayed Kandil (EGY)
1953 Naples	Olle Anderberg (SWE)	Umberto Trippa (ITA)	Elie Naasan (LIB)
1955 Karlsruhe	Imre Polyák (HUN)	Müzahir Sille (TUR)	Gunnar Håkansson (SWE)
1958 Budapest	Imre Polyák (HUN)	Müzahir Sille (TUR)	Vladimir Stashkevich (URS)
1961 Yokohama	Moustafa Hamid Mansour (UAR)	Yaşar Yılmaz (TUR)	Alireza Ghelichkhani (IRN)
1962 Toledo	Imre Polyák (HUN)	Konstantin Vyrupaev (URS)	Rıza Doğan (TUR)
1963 Helsingborg	Gennady Sapunov (URS)	Imre Polyák (HUN)	Ivan Ivanov (BUL)
1965 Tampere	Yury Grigoriev (URS)	Martti Laakso (FIN)	Lothar Schneider (GDR)
1966 Toledo	Roman Rurua (URS)	Leif Freij (SWE)	Iraj Khorshidfar (IRN)
1967 Bucharest	Roman Rurua (URS)	Simion Popescu (ROM)	Hideo Fujimoto (JPN)
1969 Mar del Plata	Roman Rurua (URS)	Roland Svensson (SWE)	Martti Laakso (FIN)
1970 Edmonton	Hideo Fujimoto (JPN)	Slavko Koletić (YUG)	Georgi Markov (BUL)
1971 Sofia	Georgi Markov (BUL)	Kazimierz Lipień (POL)	Hideo Fujimoto (JPN)
1973 Tehran	Kazimierz Lipień (POL)	Anatoly Kavkaev (URS)	László Réczi (HUN)
1974 Katowice	Kazimierz Lipień (POL)	Anatoly Kavkaev (URS)	László Réczi (HUN)
1975 Minsk	Nelson Davidyan (URS)	Kazimierz Lipień (POL)	László Réczi (HUN)
1977 Gothenburg	László Réczi (HUN)	Kazimierz Lipień (POL)	Ion Păun (ROM)
1978 Mexico City	Boris Kramarenko (URS)	Kazimierz Lipień (POL)	Lars Malmkvist (SWE)
1979 San Diego	István Tóth (HUN)	Abdurrahim Kuzu (USA)	Lars Malmkvist (SWE)
1981 Oslo	István Tóth (HUN)	Ryszard Świerad (POL)	Pertti Ukkola (FIN)
1982 Katowice	Ryszard Świerad (POL)	Roman Nasibulov (URS)	Panayot Kirov (BUL)
1983 Kyiv	Hannu Lahtinen (FIN)	Günter Reichelt (GDR)	Zhivko Vangelov (BUL)
1985 Kolbotn	Zhivko Vangelov (BUL)	Bogusław Klozik (POL)	Gheorghe Savu (ROM)
1986 Budapest	Kamandar Madzhidov (URS)	Bogusław Klozik (POL)	Zhivko Vangelov (BUL)
1987 Clermont-Ferrand	Zhivko Vangelov (BUL)	Kamandar Madzhidov (URS)	Shigeki Nishiguchi (JPN)
1989 Martigny	Kamandar Madzhidov (URS)	Huh Byung-ho (KOR)	Mario Olivera (CUB)
1990 Ostia	Mario Olivera (CUB)	Gennady Atmakin (URS)	Ryszard Wolny (POL)
1991 Varna	Sergey Martynov (URS)	Mehmet Akif Pirim (TUR)	Juan Marén (CUB)
1993 Stockholm	Sergey Martynov (RUS)	Ender Memet (ROM)	Juan Marén (CUB)
1994 Tampere	Sergey Martynov (RUS)	Ivan Ivanov (BUL)	Włodzimierz Zawadzki (POL)
1995 Prague	Sergey Martynov (RUS)	Włodzimierz Zawadzki (POL)	Mkhitar Manukyan (ARM)
1997 Wrocław	Şeref Eroğlu (TUR)	Nikolay Monov (RUS)	Włodzimierz Zawadzki (POL)
1998 Gävle	Mkhitar Manukyan (KAZ)	Şeref Eroğlu (TUR)	Choi Sang-sun (KOR)
1999 Athens	Mkhitar Manukyan (KAZ)	Şeref Eroğlu (TUR)	Michael Beilin (ISR)
2001 Patras	Vaghinak Galstyan (ARM)	Kim In-sub (KOR)	Michael Beilin (ISR)
2002 Moscow	Armen Nazaryan (BUL)	Włodzimierz Zawadzki (POL)	Roberto Monzón (CUB)
2003 Créteil	Armen Nazaryan (BUL)	Roberto Monzón (CUB)	Eusebiu Diaconu (ROM)
2005 Budapest	Armen Nazaryan (BUL)	Ali Ashkani (IRI)	Petr Švehla (CZE)
2005 Budapest	Armen Nazaryan (BUL)	Ali Ashkani (IRI)	Eusebiu Diaconu (ROM)
2006 Guangzhou	Joe Warren (USA)	David Bedinadze (GEO)	Vyacheslav Dzhaste (RUS)
2006 Guangzhou	Joe Warren (USA)	David Bedinadze (GEO)	Bünyamin Emik (TUR)
2007 Baku	David Bedinadze (GEO)	Makoto Sasamoto (JPN)	Jung Ji-hyun (KOR)
2007 Baku	David Bedinadze (GEO)	Makoto Sasamoto (JPN)	Eusebiu Diaconu (ROU)
2009 Herning	Islambek Albiev (RUS)	Dilshod Aripov (UZB)	Vitaliy Rahimov (AZE)
2009 Herning	Islambek Albiev (RUS)	Dilshod Aripov (UZB)	Nurbakyt Tengizbayev (KAZ)
2010 Moscow	Hasan Aliyev (AZE)	Ryutaro Matsumoto (JPN)	Almat Kebispayev (KAZ)
2010 Moscow	Hasan Aliyev (AZE)	Ryutaro Matsumoto (JPN)	Jung Ji-hyun (KOR)
2011 Istanbul	Omid Norouzi (IRI)	Almat Kebispayev (KAZ)	Ivo Angelov (BUL)
2011 Istanbul	Omid Norouzi (IRI)	Almat Kebispayev (KAZ)	Zaur Kuramagomedov (RUS)
2013 Budapest	Ivo Angelov (BUL)	Ivan Kuylakov (RUS)	Woo Seung-jae (KOR)
2013 Budapest	Ivo Angelov (BUL)	Ivan Kuylakov (RUS)	Elmurat Tasmuradov (UZB)
2018 Budapest	Stepan Maryanyan (RUS)	Elmurat Tasmuradov (UZB)	Rahman Bilici (TUR)
2018 Budapest	Stepan Maryanyan (RUS)	Elmurat Tasmuradov (UZB)	Lenur Temirov (UKR)
2019 Nur-Sultan	Shinobu Ota (JPN)	Stepan Maryanyan (RUS)	Slavik Galstyan (ARM)
2019 Nur-Sultan	Shinobu Ota (JPN)	Stepan Maryanyan (RUS)	Almat Kebispayev (KAZ)
2021 Oslo	Meisam Dalkhani (IRI)	Leri Abuladze (GEO)	Kensuke Shimizu (JPN)
2021 Oslo	Meisam Dalkhani (IRI)	Leri Abuladze (GEO)	Lenur Temirov (UKR)
2022 Belgrade	Sebastian Nađ (SRB)	Leri Abuladze (GEO)	Taleh Mammadov (AZE)
2022 Belgrade	Sebastian Nađ (SRB)	Leri Abuladze (GEO)	Tuo Erbatu (CHN)
2023 Belgrade	Leri Abuladze (GEO)	Murad Mammadov (AZE)	Georgii Tibilov (SRB)
2023 Belgrade	Leri Abuladze (GEO)	Murad Mammadov (AZE)	Enes Başar (TUR)
2024 Tirana	Nihat Mammadli (AZE)	Yerzhet Zharlykassyn (KAZ)	Sadyk Lalaev (AIN)
2024 Tirana	Nihat Mammadli (AZE)	Yerzhet Zharlykassyn (KAZ)	Karen Aslanyan (ARM)
2025 Zagreb	Aytjan Khalmakhanov (UZB)	Chung Han-jae (KOR)	Mohammad Mehdi Keshtkar (IRI)
2025 Zagreb	Aytjan Khalmakhanov (UZB)	Chung Han-jae (KOR)	Vitalie Eriomenco (MDA)
2026 Astana	Karen Aslanyan (ARM)	Nihat Mammadli (AZE)	Sergey Emelin (RUS)
2026 Astana	Karen Aslanyan (ARM)	Nihat Mammadli (AZE)	Ozodbek Khalimboev (UZB)

== Lightweight ==
- 67.5 kg: 1921–1922
- 67 kg: 1950–1961
- 70 kg: 1962–1967
- 68 kg: 1969–1995
- 69 kg: 1997–2001
- 66 kg: 2002–2017
- 67 kg: 2018–

Games	Gold	Silver	Bronze
1921 Helsinki	Oskari Friman (FIN)	Rūdolfs Ronis (LAT)	Juho Ikävalko (FIN)
1922 Stockholm	Edvard Westerlund (FIN)	Ödön Radvány (HUN)	Birger Nilsen (NOR)
1950 Stockholm	József Gál (HUN)	Gustav Freij (SWE)	Tevfik Yücel (TUR)
1953 Naples	Gustav Freij (SWE)	Kyösti Lehtonen (FIN)	Shazam Safin (URS)
1955 Karlsruhe	Grigory Gamarnik (URS)	Kyösti Lehtonen (FIN)	Gustav Freij (SWE)
1958 Budapest	Rıza Doğan (TUR)	Viktor Vasin (URS)	Gyula Tóth (HUN)
1961 Yokohama	Avtandil Koridze (URS)	Imre Polyák (HUN)	Branislav Martinović (YUG)
1962 Toledo	Kazım Ayvaz (TUR)	Stevan Horvat (YUG)	James Burke (USA)
1963 Helsingborg	Stevan Horvat (YUG)	David Gvantseladze (URS)	Klaus Rost (FRG)
1965 Tampere	Gennady Sapunov (URS)	Stevan Horvat (YUG)	Eero Tapio (FIN)
1966 Toledo	Stevan Horvat (YUG)	Gennady Sapunov (URS)	Eero Tapio (FIN)
1967 Bucharest	Eero Tapio (FIN)	Antal Steer (HUN)	Vahap Pehlivan (TUR)
1969 Mar del Plata	Simion Popescu (ROM)	Sreten Damjanović (YUG)	Yury Grigoriev (URS)
1970 Edmonton	Roman Rurua (URS)	Simion Popescu (ROM)	Takashi Tanoue (JPN)
1971 Sofia	Sreten Damjanović (YUG)	Klaus-Peter Göpfert (GDR)	Takashi Tanoue (JPN)
1973 Tehran	Shamil Khisamutdinov (URS)	Sreten Damjanović (YUG)	Heinz-Helmut Wehling (GDR)
1974 Katowice	Nelson Davidyan (URS)	Heinz-Helmut Wehling (GDR)	Andrzej Supron (POL)
1975 Minsk	Shamil Khisamutdinov (URS)	Andrzej Supron (POL)	Binyo Chifudov (BUL)
1977 Gothenburg	Heinz-Helmut Wehling (GDR)	Lars-Erik Skiöld (SWE)	Nikolay Dimov (BUL)
1978 Mexico City	Ștefan Rusu (ROM)	Andrzej Supron (POL)	Aleksandr Aliev (URS)
1979 San Diego	Andrzej Supron (POL)	Aleksandr Aliev (URS)	Erich Klaus (FRG)
1981 Oslo	Gennady Ermilov (URS)	Tapio Sipilä (FIN)	Ștefan Rusu (ROM)
1982 Katowice	Gennady Ermilov (URS)	István Péter (HUN)	Ștefan Negrișan (ROM)
1983 Kyiv	Tapio Sipilä (FIN)	Mohammad Bana (IRN)	Gennady Ermilov (URS)
1985 Kolbotn	Ștefan Negrișan (ROM)	Mikhail Prokudin (URS)	James Martinez (USA)
1986 Budapest	Levon Julfalakyan (URS)	Tapio Sipilä (FIN)	Claudio Passarelli (FRG)
1987 Clermont-Ferrand	Aslaudin Abaev (URS)	Nandor Sabo (YUG)	Jerzy Kopański (POL)
1989 Martigny	Claudio Passarelli (FRG)	Ghani Yalouz (FRA)	Levon Julfalakyan (URS)
1990 Ostia	Islam Dugushiev (URS)	Jannis Zamanduridis (GER)	Attila Repka (HUN)
1991 Varna	Islam Dugushiev (URS)	Marthin Kornbakk (SWE)	Stoyan Stoyanov (BUL)
1993 Stockholm	Islam Dugushiev (RUS)	Kamandar Madzhidov (BLR)	Ghani Yalouz (FRA)
1994 Tampere	Islam Dugushiev (RUS)	Ghani Yalouz (FRA)	Biser Georgiev (BUL)
1995 Prague	Rustam Adzhi (UKR)	Attila Repka (HUN)	Jannis Zamanduridis (GER)
1997 Wrocław	Son Sang-pil (KOR)	Aleksandr Tretyakov (RUS)	Ender Memet (ROM)
1998 Gävle	Aleksandr Tretyakov (RUS)	Csaba Hirbik (HUN)	Son Sang-pil (KOR)
1999 Athens	Son Sang-pil (KOR)	Aleksandr Tretyakov (RUS)	Vladimir Kopytov (BLR)
2001 Patras	Filiberto Azcuy (CUB)	Aleksey Glushkov (RUS)	Rustam Adzhi (UKR)
2002 Moscow	Jimmy Samuelsson (SWE)	Farid Mansurov (AZE)	Manuchar Kvirkvelia (GEO)
2003 Créteil	Manuchar Kvirkvelia (GEO)	Armen Vardanyan (UKR)	Levente Füredy (HUN)
2005 Budapest	Nikolay Gergov (BUL)	Kim Min-chul (KOR)	Alain Milián (CUB)
2005 Budapest	Nikolay Gergov (BUL)	Kim Min-chul (KOR)	Kim Kum-chol (PRK)
2006 Guangzhou	Li Yanyan (CHN)	Kanatbek Begaliev (KGZ)	Sergey Kovalenko (RUS)
2006 Guangzhou	Li Yanyan (CHN)	Kanatbek Begaliev (KGZ)	Justin Lester (USA)
2007 Baku	Farid Mansurov (AZE)	Steeve Guénot (FRA)	Nikolay Gergov (BUL)
2007 Baku	Farid Mansurov (AZE)	Steeve Guénot (FRA)	Justin Lester (USA)
2009 Herning	Farid Mansurov (AZE)	Manuchar Tskhadaia (GEO)	Pedro Mulens (CUB)
2009 Herning	Farid Mansurov (AZE)	Manuchar Tskhadaia (GEO)	Ambako Vachadze (RUS)
2010 Moscow	Ambako Vachadze (RUS)	Armen Vardanyan (UKR)	Vitaliy Rahimov (AZE)
2010 Moscow	Ambako Vachadze (RUS)	Armen Vardanyan (UKR)	Vasıf Arzumanov (TUR)
2011 Istanbul	Saeid Abdevali (IRI)	Manuchar Tskhadaia (GEO)	Pedro Mulens (CUB)
2011 Istanbul	Saeid Abdevali (IRI)	Manuchar Tskhadaia (GEO)	Kim Hyeon-woo (KOR)
2013 Budapest	Ryu Han-su (KOR)	Islambek Albiev (RUS)	Frank Stäbler (GER)
2013 Budapest	Ryu Han-su (KOR)	Islambek Albiev (RUS)	Sandeep Tulsi Yadav (IND)
2014 Tashkent	Davor Štefanek (SRB)	Omid Norouzi (IRI)	Tamás Lőrincz (HUN)
2014 Tashkent	Davor Štefanek (SRB)	Omid Norouzi (IRI)	Edgaras Venckaitis (LTU)
2015 Las Vegas	Frank Stäbler (GER)	Ryu Han-su (KOR)	Artem Surkov (RUS)
2015 Las Vegas	Frank Stäbler (GER)	Ryu Han-su (KOR)	Davor Štefanek (SRB)
2017 Paris	Ryu Han-su (KOR)	Mateusz Bernatek (POL)	Artem Surkov (RUS)
2017 Paris	Ryu Han-su (KOR)	Mateusz Bernatek (POL)	Atakan Yüksel (TUR)
2018 Budapest	Artem Surkov (RUS)	Davor Štefanek (SRB)	Meirzhan Shermakhanbet (KAZ)
2018 Budapest	Artem Surkov (RUS)	Davor Štefanek (SRB)	Gevorg Sahakyan (POL)
2019 Nur-Sultan	Ismael Borrero (CUB)	Artem Surkov (RUS)	Frank Stäbler (GER)
2019 Nur-Sultan	Ismael Borrero (CUB)	Artem Surkov (RUS)	Mate Nemeš (SRB)
2021 Oslo	Mohammad Reza Geraei (IRI)	Nazir Abdullaev (RWF)	Ramaz Zoidze (GEO)
2021 Oslo	Mohammad Reza Geraei (IRI)	Nazir Abdullaev (RWF)	Almat Kebispayev (KAZ)
2022 Belgrade	Mate Nemeš (SRB)	Mohammad Reza Geraei (IRI)	Hasrat Jafarov (AZE)
2022 Belgrade	Mate Nemeš (SRB)	Mohammad Reza Geraei (IRI)	Amantur Ismailov (KGZ)
2023 Belgrade	Luis Orta (CUB)	Hasrat Jafarov (AZE)	Mohammad Reza Geraei (IRI)
2023 Belgrade	Luis Orta (CUB)	Hasrat Jafarov (AZE)	Mate Nemeš (SRB)
2025 Zagreb	Saeid Esmaeili (IRI)	Hasrat Jafarov (AZE)	Slavik Galstyan (ARM)
2025 Zagreb	Saeid Esmaeili (IRI)	Hasrat Jafarov (AZE)	Daniial Agaev (UWW)
2026 Astana	Saeid Esmaeili (IRI)	Aytjan Khalmakhanov (UZB)	Luis Orta (CUB)
2026 Astana	Saeid Esmaeili (IRI)	Aytjan Khalmakhanov (UZB)	Bagdat Sabaz (KAZ)

== Light welterweight ==
- 71 kg: 2014–2017
- 72 kg: 2018–

Games	Gold	Silver	Bronze
2014 Tashkent	Chingiz Labazanov (RUS)	Yunus Özel (TUR)	Rasul Chunayev (AZE)
2014 Tashkent	Chingiz Labazanov (RUS)	Yunus Özel (TUR)	Afshin Biabangard (IRI)
2015 Las Vegas	Rasul Chunayev (AZE)	Armen Vardanyan (UKR)	Adam Kurak (RUS)
2015 Las Vegas	Rasul Chunayev (AZE)	Armen Vardanyan (UKR)	Zakarias Tallroth (SWE)
2016 Budapest	Bálint Korpási (HUN)	Daniel Cataraga (MDA)	Hasan Aliyev (AZE)
2016 Budapest	Bálint Korpási (HUN)	Daniel Cataraga (MDA)	Ilie Cojocari (ROU)
2017 Paris	Frank Stäbler (GER)	Demeu Zhadrayev (KAZ)	Bálint Korpási (HUN)
2017 Paris	Frank Stäbler (GER)	Demeu Zhadrayev (KAZ)	Mohammad Ali Geraei (IRI)
2018 Budapest	Frank Stäbler (GER)	Bálint Korpási (HUN)	Rasul Chunayev (AZE)
2018 Budapest	Frank Stäbler (GER)	Bálint Korpási (HUN)	Aik Mnatsakanian (BUL)
2019 Nur-Sultan	Abuyazid Mantsigov (RUS)	Aram Vardanyan (UZB)	Aik Mnatsakanian (BUL)
2019 Nur-Sultan	Abuyazid Mantsigov (RUS)	Aram Vardanyan (UZB)	Bálint Korpási (HUN)
2021 Oslo	Malkhas Amoyan (ARM)	Sergey Kutuzov (RWF)	Kristupas Šleiva (LTU)
2021 Oslo	Malkhas Amoyan (ARM)	Sergey Kutuzov (RWF)	Gevorg Sahakyan (POL)
2022 Belgrade	Ali Arsalan (SRB)	Ulvu Ganizade (AZE)	Selçuk Can (TUR)
2022 Belgrade	Ali Arsalan (SRB)	Ulvu Ganizade (AZE)	Andrii Kulyk (UKR)
2023 Belgrade	Ibrahim Ghanem (FRA)	Róbert Fritsch (HUN)	Ali Arsalan (SRB)
2023 Belgrade	Ibrahim Ghanem (FRA)	Róbert Fritsch (HUN)	Selçuk Can (TUR)
2024 Tirana	Ulvu Ganizade (AZE)	Ibrahim Ghanem (FRA)	Otar Abuladze (GEO)
2024 Tirana	Ulvu Ganizade (AZE)	Ibrahim Ghanem (FRA)	Ali Arsalan (SRB)
2025 Zagreb	Ulvu Ganizade (AZE)	Ibrahim Ghanem (FRA)	Danial Sohrabi (IRI)
2025 Zagreb	Ulvu Ganizade (AZE)	Ibrahim Ghanem (FRA)	Abdullo Aliev (UZB)
2026 Astana	Danial Sohrabi (IRI)	István Váncza (HUN)	Iuri Lomadze (GEO)
2026 Astana	Danial Sohrabi (IRI)	István Váncza (HUN)	Amantur Ismailov (KGZ)

== Welterweight ==
- 73 kg: 1950–1961
- 78 kg: 1962–1967
- 74 kg: 1969–1995
- 76 kg: 1997–2001
- 74 kg: 2002–2013
- 75 kg: 2014–2017
- 77 kg: 2018–

Games	Gold	Silver	Bronze
1950 Stockholm	Matti Simanainen (FIN)	Celal Atik (TUR)	Gösta Andersson (SWE)
1953 Naples	Gurgen Shatvoryan (URS)	Miklós Szilvási (HUN)	Franco Benedetti (ITA)
1955 Karlsruhe	Vladimir Maneev (URS)	Anton Mackowiak (FRG)	Milorad Arsić (YUG)
1958 Budapest	Kazım Ayvaz (TUR)	Grigory Gamarnik (URS)	Valeriu Bularca (ROM)
1961 Yokohama	Valeriu Bularca (ROM)	Stevan Horvat (YUG)	Ziya Doğan (TUR)
1962 Toledo	Anatoly Kolesov (URS)	Bjarne Ansbøl (DEN)	Yavuz Selekman (TUR)
1963 Helsingborg	Anatoly Kolesov (URS)	Rudolf Vesper (GDR)	Bertil Nyström (SWE)
1965 Tampere	Anatoly Kolesov (URS)	Kiril Petkov (BUL)	Sırrı Acar (TUR)
1966 Toledo	Viktor Igumenov (URS)	Florin Ciorcilă (ROM)	Peter Nettekoven (FRG)
1967 Bucharest	Viktor Igumenov (URS)	Rudolf Vesper (GDR)	Jan Kårström (SWE)
1969 Mar del Plata	Viktor Igumenov (URS)	Eero Tapio (FIN)	Matti Poikala (SWE)
1970 Edmonton	Viktor Igumenov (URS)	Werner Schröter (FRG)	Petros Galaktopoulos (GRE)
1971 Sofia	Viktor Igumenov (URS)	Momir Kecman (YUG)	Petros Galaktopoulos (GRE)
1973 Tehran	Ivan Kolev (BUL)	Jan Karlsson (SWE)	Klaus-Peter Göpfert (GDR)
1974 Katowice	Vítězslav Mácha (TCH)	Klaus-Peter Göpfert (GDR)	Iosif Berishvili (URS)
1975 Minsk	Anatoly Bykov (URS)	Yanko Shopov (BUL)	Mihály Toma (HUN)
1977 Gothenburg	Vítězslav Mácha (TCH)	Yanko Shopov (BUL)	Ferenc Kocsis (HUN)
1978 Mexico City	Arif Niftullayev (URS)	Ferenc Kocsis (HUN)	Gheorghe Ciobotaru (ROM)
1979 San Diego	Yanko Shopov (BUL)	Shared gold	Karl-Heinz Helbing (FRG)
1979 San Diego	Ferenc Kocsis (HUN)	Shared gold	Karl-Heinz Helbing (FRG)
1981 Oslo	Aleksandr Kudryavtsev (URS)	Mikko Huhtala (FIN)	Karolj Kasap (YUG)
1982 Katowice	Ștefan Rusu (ROM)	Andrzej Supron (POL)	Karolj Kasap (YUG)
1983 Kyiv	Mikhail Mamiashvili (URS)	Andrzej Supron (POL)	Karolj Kasap (YUG)
1985 Kolbotn	Mikhail Mamiashvili (URS)	Ștefan Rusu (ROM)	Jouko Salomäki (FIN)
1986 Budapest	Mikhail Mamiashvili (URS)	Mirko Jahn (GDR)	Dobri Ivanov (BUL)
1987 Clermont-Ferrand	Jouko Salomäki (FIN)	Józef Tracz (POL)	Daulet Turlykhanov (URS)
1989 Martigny	Daulet Turlykhanov (URS)	Anton Arghira (ROM)	Petar Tenev (BUL)
1990 Ostia	Mnatsakan Iskandaryan (URS)	Dobri Ivanov (BUL)	Željko Trajković (YUG)
1991 Varna	Mnatsakan Iskandaryan (URS)	Jaroslav Zeman (TCH)	Yvon Riemer (FRA)
1993 Stockholm	Néstor Almanza (CUB)	Józef Tracz (POL)	Yvon Riemer (FRA)
1994 Tampere	Mnatsakan Iskandaryan (RUS)	Józef Tracz (POL)	Torbjörn Kornbakk (SWE)
1995 Prague	Yvon Riemer (FRA)	Bakhtiyar Baiseitov (KAZ)	Filiberto Azcuy (CUB)
1997 Wrocław	Marko Yli-Hannuksela (FIN)	Tamás Berzicza (HUN)	Filiberto Azcuy (CUB)
1998 Gävle	Bakhtiyar Baiseitov (KAZ)	Filiberto Azcuy (CUB)	Nazmi Avluca (TUR)
1999 Athens	Nazmi Avluca (TUR)	Yvon Riemer (FRA)	Dimitrios Avramis (GRE)
2001 Patras	Ara Abrahamian (SWE)	Aleksey Mishin (RUS)	Kim Jin-soo (KOR)
2002 Moscow	Varteres Samurgashev (RUS)	Badri Khasaia (GEO)	Filiberto Azcuy (CUB)
2003 Créteil	Aleksey Glushkov (RUS)	Konstantin Schneider (GER)	Kim Jin-soo (KOR)
2005 Budapest	Varteres Samurgashev (RUS)	Mark Madsen (DEN)	Marko Yli-Hannuksela (FIN)
2005 Budapest	Varteres Samurgashev (RUS)	Mark Madsen (DEN)	Konstantin Schneider (GER)
2006 Guangzhou	Volodymyr Shatskykh (UKR)	Marko Yli-Hannuksela (FIN)	Mark Madsen (DEN)
2006 Guangzhou	Volodymyr Shatskykh (UKR)	Marko Yli-Hannuksela (FIN)	Manuchar Kvirkvelia (GEO)
2007 Baku	Yavor Yanakiev (BUL)	Mark Madsen (DEN)	Christophe Guénot (FRA)
2007 Baku	Yavor Yanakiev (BUL)	Mark Madsen (DEN)	Valdemaras Venckaitis (LTU)
2009 Herning	Selçuk Çebi (TUR)	Mark Madsen (DEN)	Aliaksandr Kikiniou (BLR)
2009 Herning	Selçuk Çebi (TUR)	Mark Madsen (DEN)	Farshad Alizadeh (IRI)
2010 Moscow	Selçuk Çebi (TUR)	Arsen Julfalakyan (ARM)	Daniar Kobonov (KGZ)
2010 Moscow	Selçuk Çebi (TUR)	Arsen Julfalakyan (ARM)	Imil Sharafetdinov (RUS)
2011 Istanbul	Roman Vlasov (RUS)	Selçuk Çebi (TUR)	Arsen Julfalakyan (ARM)
2011 Istanbul	Roman Vlasov (RUS)	Selçuk Çebi (TUR)	Neven Žugaj (CRO)
2013 Budapest	Kim Hyeon-woo (KOR)	Roman Vlasov (RUS)	Arsen Julfalakyan (ARM)
2013 Budapest	Kim Hyeon-woo (KOR)	Roman Vlasov (RUS)	Emrah Kuş (TUR)
2014 Tashkent	Arsen Julfalakyan (ARM)	Neven Žugaj (CRO)	Elvin Mursaliyev (AZE)
2014 Tashkent	Arsen Julfalakyan (ARM)	Neven Žugaj (CRO)	Andy Bisek (USA)
2015 Las Vegas	Roman Vlasov (RUS)	Mark Madsen (DEN)	Doszhan Kartikov (KAZ)
2015 Las Vegas	Roman Vlasov (RUS)	Mark Madsen (DEN)	Andy Bisek (USA)
2017 Paris	Viktor Nemeš (SRB)	Tamás Lőrincz (HUN)	Saeid Abdevali (IRI)
2017 Paris	Viktor Nemeš (SRB)	Tamás Lőrincz (HUN)	Fatih Cengiz (TUR)
2018 Budapest	Aleksandr Chekhirkin (RUS)	Tamás Lőrincz (HUN)	Kim Hyeon-woo (KOR)
2018 Budapest	Aleksandr Chekhirkin (RUS)	Tamás Lőrincz (HUN)	Viktor Nemeš (SRB)
2019 Nur-Sultan	Tamás Lőrincz (HUN)	Alex Kessidis (SWE)	Mohammad Ali Geraei (IRI)
2019 Nur-Sultan	Tamás Lőrincz (HUN)	Alex Kessidis (SWE)	Jalgasbay Berdimuratov (UZB)
2021 Oslo	Roman Vlasov (RWF)	Sanan Suleymanov (AZE)	Roland Schwarz (GER)
2021 Oslo	Roman Vlasov (RWF)	Sanan Suleymanov (AZE)	Mohammad Ali Geraei (IRI)
2022 Belgrade	Akzhol Makhmudov (KGZ)	Zoltán Lévai (HUN)	Malkhas Amoyan (ARM)
2022 Belgrade	Akzhol Makhmudov (KGZ)	Zoltán Lévai (HUN)	Yunus Emre Başar (TUR)
2023 Belgrade	Akzhol Makhmudov (KGZ)	Sanan Suleymanov (AZE)	Malkhas Amoyan (ARM)
2023 Belgrade	Akzhol Makhmudov (KGZ)	Sanan Suleymanov (AZE)	Nao Kusaka (JPN)
2025 Zagreb	Malkhas Amoyan (ARM)	Nao Kusaka (JPN)	Róbert Fritsch (HUN)
2025 Zagreb	Malkhas Amoyan (ARM)	Nao Kusaka (JPN)	Ahmet Yılmaz (TUR)
2026 Astana	Sanan Suleymanov (AZE)	Alexandrin Guțu (MDA)	Shuai Mamedau (BLR)
2026 Astana	Sanan Suleymanov (AZE)	Alexandrin Guțu (MDA)	Ali Oskoo (IRI)

== Light middleweight ==
- 80 kg: 2014–2017
- 82 kg: 2018–

Games	Gold	Silver	Bronze
2014 Tashkent	Péter Bácsi (HUN)	Evgeny Saleev (RUS)	Jim Pettersson (SWE)
2014 Tashkent	Péter Bácsi (HUN)	Evgeny Saleev (RUS)	Selçuk Çebi (TUR)
2015 Las Vegas	Selçuk Çebi (TUR)	Viktar Sasunouski (BLR)	Lasha Gobadze (GEO)
2015 Las Vegas	Selçuk Çebi (TUR)	Viktar Sasunouski (BLR)	Yousef Ghaderian (IRI)
2016 Budapest	Ramazan Abacharaev (RUS)	Aslan Atem (TUR)	László Szabó (HUN)
2016 Budapest	Ramazan Abacharaev (RUS)	Aslan Atem (TUR)	Jonibek Otabekov (UZB)
2017 Paris	Maksim Manukyan (ARM)	Radzik Kuliyeu (BLR)	Elvin Mursaliyev (AZE)
2017 Paris	Maksim Manukyan (ARM)	Radzik Kuliyeu (BLR)	Pascal Eisele (GER)
2018 Budapest	Péter Bácsi (HUN)	Emrah Kuş (TUR)	Maksim Manukyan (ARM)
2018 Budapest	Péter Bácsi (HUN)	Emrah Kuş (TUR)	Viktar Sasunouski (BLR)
2019 Nur-Sultan	Lasha Gobadze (GEO)	Rafig Huseynov (AZE)	Qian Haitao (CHN)
2019 Nur-Sultan	Lasha Gobadze (GEO)	Rafig Huseynov (AZE)	Saeid Abdevali (IRI)
2021 Oslo	Rafig Huseynov (AZE)	Burhan Akbudak (TUR)	Pejman Poshtam (IRI)
2021 Oslo	Rafig Huseynov (AZE)	Burhan Akbudak (TUR)	Adlan Akiev (RWF)
2022 Belgrade	Burhan Akbudak (TUR)	Jalgasbay Berdimuratov (UZB)	Tamás Lévai (HUN)
2022 Belgrade	Burhan Akbudak (TUR)	Jalgasbay Berdimuratov (UZB)	Yaroslav Filchakov (UKR)
2023 Belgrade	Rafig Huseynov (AZE)	Alireza Mohmadi (IRI)	Aues Gonibov (AIN)
2023 Belgrade	Rafig Huseynov (AZE)	Alireza Mohmadi (IRI)	Yaroslav Filchakov (UKR)
2024 Tirana	Mohammad Ali Geraei (IRI)	Erik Szilvássy (HUN)	Gela Bolkvadze (GEO)
2024 Tirana	Mohammad Ali Geraei (IRI)	Erik Szilvássy (HUN)	Ahmet Yılmaz (TUR)
2025 Zagreb	Gholamreza Farrokhi (IRI)	Gela Bolkvadze (GEO)	Karlo Kodrić (CRO)
2025 Zagreb	Gholamreza Farrokhi (IRI)	Gela Bolkvadze (GEO)	Taizo Yoshida (JPN)
2026 Astana	Gholamreza Farrokhi (IRI)	Yüksel Sarıçiçek (TUR)	Akzhol Makhmudov (KGZ)
2026 Astana	Gholamreza Farrokhi (IRI)	Yüksel Sarıçiçek (TUR)	Mihail Bradu (MDA)

== Middleweight ==
- 75 kg: 1921–1922
- 79 kg: 1950–1961
- 87 kg: 1962–1967
- 82 kg: 1969–1995
- 85 kg: 1997–2001
- 84 kg: 2002–2013
- 85 kg: 2014–2017
- 87 kg: 2018–

Games	Gold	Silver	Bronze
1921 Helsinki	Taavi Tamminen (FIN)	Volmari Vikström (FIN)	Edvard Westerlund (FIN)
1922 Stockholm	Carl Westergren (SWE)	Einar Pettersen (NOR)	Charles Frisenfeldt (DEN)
1950 Stockholm	Axel Grönberg (SWE)	Ali Özdemir (TUR)	Gyula Németi (HUN)
1953 Naples	Givi Kartozia (URS)	Axel Grönberg (SWE)	Kalervo Rauhala (FIN)
1955 Karlsruhe	Givi Kartozia (URS)	György Gurics (HUN)	Horst Heß (FRG)
1958 Budapest	Givi Kartozia (URS)	Horst Heß (FRG)	Lothar Metz (GDR)
1961 Yokohama	Vasily Zenin (URS)	Bertil Nyström (SWE)	Yavuz Selekman (TUR)
1962 Toledo	Tevfik Kış (TUR)	Krali Bimbalov (BUL)	Anatoly Kirov (URS)
1963 Helsingborg	Tevfik Kış (TUR)	Branislav Simić (YUG)	György Gurics (HUN)
1965 Tampere	Rimantas Bagdonas (URS)	Bolesław Mackiewicz (POL)	Jiří Kormaník (TCH)
1966 Toledo	Valentin Olenik (URS)	Tevfik Kış (TUR)	Franz Pötsch (AUT)
1967 Bucharest	László Sillai (HUN)	Valentin Olenik (URS)	Wacław Orłowski (POL)
1969 Mar del Plata	Petar Krumov (BUL)	Omar Bliadze (URS)	Milan Nenadić (YUG)
1970 Edmonton	Anatoly Nazarenko (URS)	Petar Krumov (BUL)	Milan Nenadić (YUG)
1971 Sofia	Csaba Hegedűs (HUN)	Anatoly Nazarenko (URS)	Kiril Dimitrov (BUL)
1973 Tehran	Leonid Liberman (URS)	Milan Nenadić (YUG)	Miroslav Janota (TCH)
1974 Katowice	Anatoly Nazarenko (URS)	Dimitar Ivanov (BUL)	Ion Enache (ROM)
1975 Minsk	Anatoly Nazarenko (URS)	Ion Enache (ROM)	Adam Ostrowski (POL)
1977 Gothenburg	Vladimir Cheboksarov (URS)	Ion Draica (ROM)	Momir Petković (YUG)
1978 Mexico City	Ion Draica (ROM)	Momir Petković (YUG)	Vladimir Cheboksarov (URS)
1979 San Diego	Gennady Korban (URS)	Momir Petković (YUG)	Pavel Pavlov (BUL)
1981 Oslo	Gennady Korban (URS)	Momir Petković (YUG)	Ion Draica (ROM)
1982 Katowice	Taymuraz Apkhazava (URS)	Ion Draica (ROM)	Jan Dołgowicz (POL)
1983 Kyiv	Taymuraz Apkhazava (URS)	Lennart Lundell (SWE)	Jarmo Övermark (FIN)
1985 Kolbotn	Bogdan Daras (POL)	Abdulbasir Battalov (URS)	Klaus Mysen (NOR)
1986 Budapest	Tibor Komáromi (HUN)	Shared gold	Sorin Herțea (ROM)
1986 Budapest	Bogdan Daras (POL)	Shared gold	Magnus Fredriksson (SWE)
1987 Clermont-Ferrand	Tibor Komáromi (HUN)	Roger Gössner (FRG)	Sergey Nasevich (URS)
1989 Martigny	Tibor Komáromi (HUN)	Mikhail Mamiashvili (URS)	Magnus Fredriksson (SWE)
1990 Ostia	Péter Farkas (HUN)	Mikhail Mamiashvili (URS)	Goran Kasum (YUG)
1991 Varna	Péter Farkas (HUN)	Todor Angelov (BUL)	Goran Kasum (YUG)
1993 Stockholm	Hamza Yerlikaya (TUR)	Daulet Turlykhanov (KAZ)	Murat Kardanov (RUS)
1994 Tampere	Thomas Zander (GER)	Tuomo Karila (FIN)	Valery Tsilent (BLR)
1995 Prague	Hamza Yerlikaya (TUR)	Gocha Tsitsiashvili (ISR)	Thomas Zander (GER)
1997 Wrocław	Sergey Tsvir (RUS)	Hamza Yerlikaya (TUR)	Thomas Zander (GER)
1998 Gävle	Aleksandr Menshchikov (RUS)	János Kismoni (HUN)	Martin Lidberg (SWE)
1999 Athens	Luis Enrique Méndez (CUB)	Thomas Zander (GER)	Raatbek Sanatbayev (KGZ)
2001 Patras	Mukhran Vakhtangadze (GEO)	Matt Lindland (USA)	Oleksandr Daragan (UKR)
2002 Moscow	Ara Abrahamian (SWE)	Aleksandr Menshchikov (RUS)	Mohamed Abdelfatah (EGY)
2003 Créteil	Gocha Tsitsiashvili (ISR)	Ara Abrahamian (SWE)	Attila Bátky (SVK)
2005 Budapest	Alim Selimau (BLR)	Aleksey Mishin (RUS)	Sándor Bárdosi (HUN)
2005 Budapest	Alim Selimau (BLR)	Aleksey Mishin (RUS)	Nazmi Avluca (TUR)
2006 Guangzhou	Mohamed Abdelfatah (EGY)	Nazmi Avluca (TUR)	Saman Tahmasebi (IRI)
2006 Guangzhou	Mohamed Abdelfatah (EGY)	Nazmi Avluca (TUR)	Aleksey Mishin (RUS)
2007 Baku	Aleksey Mishin (RUS)	Brad Vering (USA)	Badri Khasaia (GEO)
2007 Baku	Aleksey Mishin (RUS)	Brad Vering (USA)	Saman Tahmasebi (IRI)
2009 Herning	Nazmi Avluca (TUR)	Mélonin Noumonvi (FRA)	Pablo Shorey (CUB)
2009 Herning	Nazmi Avluca (TUR)	Mélonin Noumonvi (FRA)	Habibollah Akhlaghi (IRI)
2010 Moscow	Hristo Marinov (BUL)	Pablo Shorey (CUB)	Nenad Žugaj (CRO)
2010 Moscow	Hristo Marinov (BUL)	Pablo Shorey (CUB)	Aleksey Mishin (RUS)
2011 Istanbul	Alim Selimau (BLR)	Damian Janikowski (POL)	Rami Hietaniemi (FIN)
2011 Istanbul	Alim Selimau (BLR)	Damian Janikowski (POL)	Nazmi Avluca (TUR)
2013 Budapest	Taleb Nematpour (IRI)	Saman Tahmasebi (AZE)	Javid Hamzatau (BLR)
2013 Budapest	Taleb Nematpour (IRI)	Saman Tahmasebi (AZE)	Viktor Lőrincz (HUN)
2014 Tashkent	Mélonin Noumonvi (FRA)	Saman Tahmasebi (AZE)	Viktor Lőrincz (HUN)
2014 Tashkent	Mélonin Noumonvi (FRA)	Saman Tahmasebi (AZE)	Zhan Beleniuk (UKR)
2015 Las Vegas	Zhan Beleniuk (UKR)	Rustam Assakalov (UZB)	Saman Tahmasebi (AZE)
2015 Las Vegas	Zhan Beleniuk (UKR)	Rustam Assakalov (UZB)	Habibollah Akhlaghi (IRI)
2017 Paris	Metehan Başar (TUR)	Denis Kudla (GER)	Roberti Kobliashvili (GEO)
2017 Paris	Metehan Başar (TUR)	Denis Kudla (GER)	Hossein Nouri (IRI)
2018 Budapest	Metehan Başar (TUR)	Zhan Beleniuk (UKR)	Artur Shahinyan (ARM)
2018 Budapest	Metehan Başar (TUR)	Zhan Beleniuk (UKR)	Roberti Kobliashvili (GEO)
2019 Nur-Sultan	Zhan Beleniuk (UKR)	Viktor Lőrincz (HUN)	Denis Kudla (GER)
2019 Nur-Sultan	Zhan Beleniuk (UKR)	Viktor Lőrincz (HUN)	Rustam Assakalov (UZB)
2021 Oslo	Kiryl Maskevich (BLR)	Lasha Gobadze (GEO)	Turpal Bisultanov (DEN)
2021 Oslo	Kiryl Maskevich (BLR)	Lasha Gobadze (GEO)	Arkadiusz Kułynycz (POL)
2022 Belgrade	Turpal Bisultanov (DEN)	Dávid Losonczi (HUN)	Alex Kessidis (SWE)
2022 Belgrade	Turpal Bisultanov (DEN)	Dávid Losonczi (HUN)	Ali Cengiz (TUR)
2023 Belgrade	Dávid Losonczi (HUN)	Shared gold	Semen Novikov (BUL)
2023 Belgrade	Ali Cengiz (TUR)	Shared gold	Zhan Beleniuk (UKR)
2025 Zagreb	Aleksandr Komarov (SRB)	Alireza Mohmadi (IRI)	Asan Zhanyshov (KGZ)
2025 Zagreb	Aleksandr Komarov (SRB)	Alireza Mohmadi (IRI)	Milad Alirzaev (UWW)
2026 Astana	Semen Novikov (BUL)	Alireza Mohmadi (IRI)	Gevorg Tadevosyan (ARM)
2026 Astana	Semen Novikov (BUL)	Alireza Mohmadi (IRI)	Lasha Gobadze (GEO)

== Light heavyweight ==
- 82.5 kg: 1921–1922
- 87 kg: 1950–1961
- 97 kg: 1962–1967
- 90 kg: 1969–1995

Games	Gold	Silver	Bronze
1921 Helsinki	Edil Rosenqvist (FIN)	Rudolf Svensson (SWE)	Jan Muijs (HOL)
1922 Stockholm	Edil Rosenqvist (FIN)	Rudolf Svensson (SWE)	Svend Nielsen (DEN)
1950 Stockholm	Muharrem Candaş (TUR)	Gyula Kovács (HUN)	Trygve Andersen (NOR)
1953 Naples	August Englas (URS)	Kelpo Gröndahl (FIN)	Kurt Rusterholz (SUI)
1955 Karlsruhe	Valentin Nikolayev (URS)	Veikko Lahti (FIN)	Karl-Erik Nilsson (SWE)
1958 Budapest	Rostom Abashidze (URS)	György Gurics (HUN)	Rune Jansson (SWE)
1961 Yokohama	György Gurics (HUN)	Arkady Tkachev (URS)	Gheorghe Popovici (ROM)
1962 Toledo	Rostom Abashidze (URS)	Boyan Radev (BUL)	İsmet Atlı (TUR)
1963 Helsingborg	Rostom Abashidze (URS)	Nicolae Martinescu (ROM)	Hamit Kaplan (TUR)
1965 Tampere	Valery Anisimov (URS)	Ferenc Kiss (HUN)	Czesław Kwieciński (POL)
1966 Toledo	Boyan Radev (BUL)	Valery Anisimov (URS)	Nicolae Martinescu (ROM)
1967 Bucharest	Nikolay Yakovenko (URS)	Boyan Radev (BUL)	Nicolae Martinescu (ROM)
1969 Mar del Plata	Aleksandr Yurkevich (URS)	Venko Tsintsarov (BUL)	Nicolae Neguț (ROM)
1970 Edmonton	Valery Rezantsev (URS)	Czesław Kwieciński (POL)	Venko Tsintsarov (BUL)
1971 Sofia	Valery Rezantsev (URS)	Stoyan Nikolov (BUL)	Lothar Metz (GDR)
1973 Tehran	Valery Rezantsev (URS)	Czesław Kwieciński (POL)	Stoyan Nikolov (BUL)
1974 Katowice	Valery Rezantsev (URS)	Stoyan Nikolov (BUL)	Dumitru Manea (ROM)
1975 Minsk	Valery Rezantsev (URS)	Stoyan Nikolov (BUL)	Fred Theobald (FRG)
1977 Gothenburg	Frank Andersson (SWE)	Petre Dicu (ROM)	Stoyan Nikolov (BUL)
1978 Mexico City	Stoyan Nikolov (BUL)	Frank Andersson (SWE)	Viktor Avdyshev (URS)
1979 San Diego	Frank Andersson (SWE)	Norbert Növényi (HUN)	Pedro Pawlidis (FRG)
1981 Oslo	Igor Kanygin (URS)	Frank Andersson (SWE)	Franz Pitschmann (AUT)
1982 Katowice	Frank Andersson (SWE)	Atanas Komchev (BUL)	Igor Kanygin (URS)
1983 Kyiv	Igor Kanygin (URS)	Atanas Komchev (BUL)	Norbert Növényi (HUN)
1985 Kolbotn	Mike Houck (USA)	Igor Kanygin (URS)	Atanas Komchev (BUL)
1986 Budapest	Andrzej Malina (POL)	Atanas Komchev (BUL)	Jindřich Durčák (TCH)
1987 Clermont-Ferrand	Vladimir Popov (URS)	Sándor Major (HUN)	Atanas Komchev (BUL)
1989 Martigny	Maik Bullmann (GDR)	Michial Foy (USA)	Roger Gries (FRG)
1990 Ostia	Maik Bullmann (GER)	Harri Koskela (FIN)	Vyacheslav Oliynyk (URS)
1991 Varna	Maik Bullmann (GER)	Reynaldo Peña (CUB)	Harri Koskela (FIN)
1993 Stockholm	Gogi Koguashvili (RUS)	Maik Bullmann (GER)	Tengiz Tedoradze (GEO)
1994 Tampere	Gogi Koguashvili (RUS)	Vyacheslav Oliynyk (UKR)	Maik Bullmann (GER)
1995 Prague	Hakkı Başar (TUR)	Petru Sudureac (ROM)	Gogi Koguashvili (RUS)

== Heavyweight ==
- +82.5 kg: 1921–1922
- +87 kg: 1950–1961
- +97 kg: 1962–1967
- 100 kg: 1969–1995
- 97 kg: 1997–2001
- 96 kg: 2002–2013
- 98 kg: 2014–2017
- 97 kg: 2018–

Games	Gold	Silver	Bronze
1921 Helsinki	Johan Salila (FIN)	Martti Nieminen (FIN)	Emil Larsen (DEN)
1922 Stockholm	Ernst Nilsson (SWE)	Anders Ahlgren (SWE)	Toivo Pohjala (FIN)
1950 Stockholm	Bertil Antonsson (SWE)	Gyula Bóbis (HUN)	Adil Candemir (TUR)
1953 Naples	Bertil Antonsson (SWE)	Johannes Kotkas (URS)	Guido Fantoni (ITA)
1955 Karlsruhe	Aleksandr Mazur (URS)	Bertil Antonsson (SWE)	Hamit Kaplan (TUR)
1958 Budapest	Ivan Bohdan (URS)	Lyutvi Ahmedov (BUL)	Hamit Kaplan (TUR)
1961 Yokohama	Ivan Bohdan (URS)	Hamit Kaplan (TUR)	István Kozma (HUN)
1962 Toledo	István Kozma (HUN)	Anatoly Roshchin (URS)	Wilfried Dietrich (FRG)
1963 Helsingborg	Anatoly Roshchin (URS)	Ragnar Svensson (SWE)	James Raschke (USA)
1965 Tampere	Nikolay Shmakov (URS)	István Kozma (HUN)	Petr Kment (TCH)
1966 Toledo	István Kozma (HUN)	Nikolay Shmakov (URS)	Petr Kment (TCH)
1967 Bucharest	István Kozma (HUN)	Anatoly Roshchin (URS)	Petr Kment (TCH)
1969 Mar del Plata	Nikolay Yakovenko (URS)	Stefan Petrov (BUL)	Lennart Eriksson (SWE)
1970 Edmonton	Pelle Svensson (SWE)	Ferenc Kiss (HUN)	Nikolay Yakovenko (URS)
1971 Sofia	Pelle Svensson (SWE)	Nicolae Martinescu (ROM)	Marin Kolev (BUL)
1973 Tehran	Nikolay Balboshin (URS)	Kamen Goranov (BUL)	Andrzej Skrzydlewski (POL)
1974 Katowice	Nikolay Balboshin (URS)	Kamen Goranov (BUL)	Nicolae Martinescu (ROM)
1975 Minsk	Kamen Goranov (BUL)	Fredi Albrecht (GDR)	Andrzej Skrzydlewski (POL)
1977 Gothenburg	Nikolay Balboshin (URS)	Refik Memišević (YUG)	Georgi Raykov (BUL)
1978 Mexico City	Nikolay Balboshin (URS)	Georgi Raykov (BUL)	Refik Memišević (YUG)
1979 San Diego	Nikolay Balboshin (URS)	Georgi Raykov (BUL)	Brad Rheingans (USA)
1981 Oslo	Mikhail Saladze (URS)	Tamás Gáspár (HUN)	Roman Wrocławski (POL)
1982 Katowice	Roman Wrocławski (POL)	Vasile Andrei (ROM)	Andrey Dimitrov (BUL)
1983 Kyiv	Andrey Dimitrov (BUL)	Jožef Tertei (YUG)	Viktor Avdyshev (URS)
1985 Kolbotn	Andrey Dimitrov (BUL)	Tamás Gáspár (HUN)	Anatoly Fedorenko (URS)
1986 Budapest	Tamás Gáspár (HUN)	Vasile Andrei (ROM)	Anatoly Fedorenko (URS)
1987 Clermont-Ferrand	Guram Gedekhauri (URS)	Dennis Koslowski (USA)	Vasile Andrei (ROM)
1989 Martigny	Gerhard Himmel (FRG)	Ilia Georgiev (BUL)	Anatoly Fedorenko (URS)
1990 Ostia	Sergey Demyashkevich (URS)	Sándor Major (HUN)	Dušan Masár (TCH)
1991 Varna	Héctor Milián (CUB)	Jörgen Olsson (SWE)	Sergey Demyashkevich (URS)
1993 Stockholm	Mikael Ljungberg (SWE)	Ibragim Shovkhalov (RUS)	Andrzej Wroński (POL)
1994 Tampere	Andrzej Wroński (POL)	Bakur Gogitidze (GEO)	Georgiy Saldadze (UKR)
1995 Prague	Mikael Ljungberg (SWE)	Héctor Milián (CUB)	Georgiy Saldadze (UKR)
1997 Wrocław	Gogi Koguashvili (RUS)	Anatoly Fedorenko (BLR)	Andrzej Wroński (POL)
1998 Gävle	Gogi Koguashvili (RUS)	Marek Švec (CZE)	Davyd Saldadze (UKR)
1999 Athens	Gogi Koguashvili (RUS)	Andrzej Wroński (POL)	Mikael Ljungberg (SWE)
2001 Patras	Aleksandr Bezruchkin (RUS)	Ernesto Peña (CUB)	Mehmet Özal (TUR)
2002 Moscow	Mehmet Özal (TUR)	Karam Gaber (EGY)	Ali Mollov (BUL)
2003 Créteil	Martin Lidberg (SWE)	Karam Gaber (EGY)	Ramaz Nozadze (GEO)
2005 Budapest	Hamza Yerlikaya (TUR)	Lajos Virág (HUN)	Vasily Teploukhov (RUS)
2005 Budapest	Hamza Yerlikaya (TUR)	Lajos Virág (HUN)	Justin Ruiz (USA)
2006 Guangzhou	Heiki Nabi (EST)	Marek Švec (CZE)	Kaloyan Dinchev (BUL)
2006 Guangzhou	Heiki Nabi (EST)	Marek Švec (CZE)	Hamza Yerlikaya (TUR)
2007 Baku	Ramaz Nozadze (GEO)	Mindaugas Ežerskis (LTU)	Marek Švec (CZE)
2007 Baku	Ramaz Nozadze (GEO)	Mindaugas Ežerskis (LTU)	Ghasem Rezaei (IRI)
2009 Herning	Balázs Kiss (HUN)	Jimmy Lidberg (SWE)	Amir Aliakbari (IRI)
2009 Herning	Balázs Kiss (HUN)	Jimmy Lidberg (SWE)	Aslanbek Khushtov (RUS)
2010 Moscow	Amir Aliakbari (IRI)	Tsimafei Dzeinichenka (BLR)	Aslanbek Khushtov (RUS)
2010 Moscow	Amir Aliakbari (IRI)	Tsimafei Dzeinichenka (BLR)	Jimmy Lidberg (SWE)
2011 Istanbul	Elis Guri (BUL)	Jimmy Lidberg (SWE)	Rustam Totrov (RUS)
2011 Istanbul	Elis Guri (BUL)	Jimmy Lidberg (SWE)	Cenk İldem (TUR)
2013 Budapest	Nikita Melnikov (RUS)	Artur Aleksanyan (ARM)	Shalva Gadabadze (AZE)
2013 Budapest	Nikita Melnikov (RUS)	Artur Aleksanyan (ARM)	Balázs Kiss (HUN)
2014 Tashkent	Artur Aleksanyan (ARM)	Oliver Hassler (GER)	Ghasem Rezaei (IRI)
2014 Tashkent	Artur Aleksanyan (ARM)	Oliver Hassler (GER)	Cenk İldem (TUR)
2015 Las Vegas	Artur Aleksanyan (ARM)	Ghasem Rezaei (IRI)	Islam Magomedov (RUS)
2015 Las Vegas	Artur Aleksanyan (ARM)	Ghasem Rezaei (IRI)	Dimitriy Timchenko (UKR)
2017 Paris	Artur Aleksanyan (ARM)	Musa Evloev (RUS)	Revaz Nadareishvili (GEO)
2017 Paris	Artur Aleksanyan (ARM)	Musa Evloev (RUS)	Balázs Kiss (HUN)
2018 Budapest	Musa Evloev (RUS)	Kiril Milov (BUL)	Mehdi Aliyari (IRI)
2018 Budapest	Musa Evloev (RUS)	Kiril Milov (BUL)	Mikheil Kajaia (SRB)
2019 Nur-Sultan	Musa Evloev (RUS)	Artur Aleksanyan (ARM)	Mikheil Kajaia (SRB)
2019 Nur-Sultan	Musa Evloev (RUS)	Artur Aleksanyan (ARM)	Cenk İldem (TUR)
2021 Oslo	Mohammad Hadi Saravi (IRI)	Alex Szőke (HUN)	Artur Sargsian (RWF)
2021 Oslo	Mohammad Hadi Saravi (IRI)	Alex Szőke (HUN)	G'Angelo Hancock (USA)
2022 Belgrade	Artur Aleksanyan (ARM)	Kiril Milov (BUL)	Arif Niftullayev (AZE)
2022 Belgrade	Artur Aleksanyan (ARM)	Kiril Milov (BUL)	Mohammad Hadi Saravi (IRI)
2023 Belgrade	Gabriel Rosillo (CUB)	Artur Aleksanyan (ARM)	Artur Omarov (CZE)
2023 Belgrade	Gabriel Rosillo (CUB)	Artur Aleksanyan (ARM)	Mohammad Hadi Saravi (IRI)
2025 Zagreb	Mohammad Hadi Saravi (IRI)	Artur Sargsian (UWW)	Murad Ahmadiyev (AZE)
2025 Zagreb	Mohammad Hadi Saravi (IRI)	Artur Sargsian (UWW)	Kiryl Maskevich (UWW)
2026 Astana	Kiryl Maskevich (BLR)	Artur Sargsian (RUS)	Kiril Milov (BUL)
2026 Astana	Kiryl Maskevich (BLR)	Artur Sargsian (RUS)	Mohammad Hadi Saravi (IRI)

== Super heavyweight ==
- +100 kg: 1969–1983
- 130 kg: 1985–2001
- 120 kg: 2002–2013
- 130 kg: 2014–

Games	Gold	Silver	Bronze
1969 Mar del Plata	Anatoly Roshchin (URS)	Wilfried Dietrich (FRG)	Petar Donev (BUL)
1970 Edmonton	Anatoly Roshchin (URS)	József Csatári (HUN)	Nicolae Martinescu (ROM)
1971 Sofia	Aleksandar Tomov (BUL)	Anatoly Roshchin (URS)	Petr Kment (TCH)
1973 Tehran	Aleksandar Tomov (BUL)	Petr Kment (TCH)	Shota Morchiladze (URS)
1974 Katowice	Aleksandar Tomov (BUL)	Shota Morchiladze (URS)	János Rovnyai (HUN)
1975 Minsk	Aleksandar Tomov (BUL)	Aleksandr Kolchinsky (URS)	Roman Codreanu (ROM)
1977 Gothenburg	Nikola Dinev (BUL)	Aleksandr Kolchinsky (URS)	Arne Robertsson (SWE)
1978 Mexico City	Aleksandr Kolchinsky (URS)	Nikola Dinev (BUL)	Roman Codreanu (ROM)
1979 San Diego	Aleksandar Tomov (BUL)	Aleksandr Kolchinsky (URS)	Bob Walker (USA)
1981 Oslo	Refik Memišević (YUG)	Nikola Dinev (BUL)	Evgeny Artyukhin (URS)
1982 Katowice	Nikola Dinev (BUL)	Refik Memišević (YUG)	Cándido Mesa (CUB)
1983 Kyiv	Evgeny Artyukhin (URS)	Nikola Dinev (BUL)	Cándido Mesa (CUB)
1985 Kolbotn	Igor Rostorotsky (URS)	Ioan Grigoraș (ROM)	Rangel Gerovski (BUL)
1986 Budapest	Tomas Johansson (SWE)	Vladimir Grigoriev (URS)	László Klauz (HUN)
1987 Clermont-Ferrand	Igor Rostorotsky (URS)	Tomas Johansson (SWE)	Rangel Gerovski (BUL)
1989 Martigny	Aleksandr Karelin (URS)	László Klauz (HUN)	Tomas Johansson (SWE)
1990 Ostia	Aleksandr Karelin (URS)	Tomas Johansson (SWE)	Rangel Gerovski (BUL)
1991 Varna	Aleksandr Karelin (URS)	Matt Ghaffari (USA)	Rangel Gerovski (BUL)
1993 Stockholm	Aleksandr Karelin (RUS)	Sergei Mureiko (MLD)	Tomas Johansson (SWE)
1994 Tampere	Aleksandr Karelin (RUS)	Héctor Milián (CUB)	Petro Kotok (UKR)
1995 Prague	Aleksandr Karelin (RUS)	Sergei Mureiko (MDA)	Matt Ghaffari (USA)
1997 Wrocław	Aleksandr Karelin (RUS)	Mihály Deák-Bárdos (HUN)	Héctor Milián (CUB)
1998 Gävle	Aleksandr Karelin (RUS)	Matt Ghaffari (USA)	Yuri Evseichik (ISR)
1999 Athens	Aleksandr Karelin (RUS)	Héctor Milián (CUB)	Sergei Mureiko (BUL)
2001 Patras	Rulon Gardner (USA)	Mihály Deák-Bárdos (HUN)	Xenofon Koutsioumpas (GRE)
2002 Moscow	Dremiel Byers (USA)	Mihály Deák-Bárdos (HUN)	Yury Patrikeyev (RUS)
2003 Créteil	Khasan Baroev (RUS)	Mihály Deák-Bárdos (HUN)	Georgiy Tsurtsumia (KAZ)
2005 Budapest	Mijaín López (CUB)	Mihály Deák-Bárdos (HUN)	Siarhei Artsiukhin (BLR)
2005 Budapest	Mijaín López (CUB)	Mihály Deák-Bárdos (HUN)	Yekta Yılmaz Gül (TUR)
2006 Guangzhou	Khasan Baroev (RUS)	Mijaín López (CUB)	Siarhei Artsiukhin (BLR)
2006 Guangzhou	Khasan Baroev (RUS)	Mijaín López (CUB)	İsmail Güzel (TUR)
2007 Baku	Mijaín López (CUB)	Khasan Baroev (RUS)	Yury Patrikeyev (ARM)
2007 Baku	Mijaín López (CUB)	Khasan Baroev (RUS)	Dremiel Byers (USA)
2009 Herning	Mijaín López (CUB)	Dremiel Byers (USA)	Jalmar Sjöberg (SWE)
2009 Herning	Mijaín López (CUB)	Dremiel Byers (USA)	Rıza Kayaalp (TUR)
2010 Moscow	Mijaín López (CUB)	Yury Patrikeyev (ARM)	Nurmakhan Tinaliyev (KAZ)
2010 Moscow	Mijaín López (CUB)	Yury Patrikeyev (ARM)	Rıza Kayaalp (TUR)
2011 Istanbul	Rıza Kayaalp (TUR)	Mijaín López (CUB)	Bashir Babajanzadeh (IRI)
2011 Istanbul	Rıza Kayaalp (TUR)	Mijaín López (CUB)	Nurmakhan Tinaliyev (KAZ)
2013 Budapest	Heiki Nabi (EST)	Rıza Kayaalp (TUR)	Nurmakhan Tinaliyev (KAZ)
2013 Budapest	Heiki Nabi (EST)	Rıza Kayaalp (TUR)	Johan Eurén (SWE)
2014 Tashkent	Mijaín López (CUB)	Rıza Kayaalp (TUR)	Heiki Nabi (EST)
2014 Tashkent	Mijaín López (CUB)	Rıza Kayaalp (TUR)	Bilyal Makhov (RUS)
2015 Las Vegas	Rıza Kayaalp (TUR)	Mijaín López (CUB)	Oleksandr Chernetskyi (UKR)
2015 Las Vegas	Rıza Kayaalp (TUR)	Mijaín López (CUB)	Robby Smith (USA)
2017 Paris	Rıza Kayaalp (TUR)	Heiki Nabi (EST)	Yasmani Acosta (CHI)
2017 Paris	Rıza Kayaalp (TUR)	Heiki Nabi (EST)	Óscar Pino (CUB)
2018 Budapest	Sergey Semenov (RUS)	Adam Coon (USA)	Óscar Pino (CUB)
2018 Budapest	Sergey Semenov (RUS)	Adam Coon (USA)	Kim Min-seok (KOR)
2019 Nur-Sultan	Rıza Kayaalp (TUR)	Óscar Pino (CUB)	Heiki Nabi (EST)
2019 Nur-Sultan	Rıza Kayaalp (TUR)	Óscar Pino (CUB)	Iakobi Kajaia (GEO)
2021 Oslo	Ali Akbar Yousefi (IRI)	Zurabi Gedekhauri (RWF)	Iakobi Kajaia (GEO)
2021 Oslo	Ali Akbar Yousefi (IRI)	Zurabi Gedekhauri (RWF)	Oskar Marvik (NOR)
2022 Belgrade	Rıza Kayaalp (TUR)	Amin Mirzazadeh (IRI)	Mantas Knystautas (LTU)
2022 Belgrade	Rıza Kayaalp (TUR)	Amin Mirzazadeh (IRI)	Alin Alexuc-Ciurariu (ROU)
2023 Belgrade	Amin Mirzazadeh (IRI)	Rıza Kayaalp (TUR)	Óscar Pino (CUB)
2023 Belgrade	Amin Mirzazadeh (IRI)	Rıza Kayaalp (TUR)	Abdellatif Mohamed (EGY)
2025 Zagreb	Amin Mirzazadeh (IRI)	Dárius Vitek (HUN)	Elias Kuosmanen (FIN)
2025 Zagreb	Amin Mirzazadeh (IRI)	Dárius Vitek (HUN)	Pavel Hlinchuk (UWW)
2026 Astana	Fardin Hedayati (IRI)	Dárius Vitek (HUN)	Pavel Hlinchuk (BLR)
2026 Astana	Fardin Hedayati (IRI)	Dárius Vitek (HUN)	Jiang Wenhao (CHN)

== Medal table ==
Rank	Nation	Gold	Silver	Bronze	Total
1	Soviet Union	132	49	30	211
2	Russia	44	23	26	93
3	Bulgaria	35	36	50	121
4	Hungary	29	46	35	110
5	Turkey	27	33	43	103
6	Iran	26	15	33	74
7	Sweden	22	23	26	71
8	Cuba	20	12	23	55
9	Finland	16	16	20	52
10	Azerbaijan	16	14	18	48
11	Romania	14	26	28	68
12	Poland	12	27	20	59
13	Armenia	11	10	15	36
14	South Korea	10	13	17	40
15	Germany	9	6	14	29
16	Georgia	8	11	20	39
17	Japan	8	9	16	33
18	Kazakhstan	6	9	18	33
19	Serbia	6	1	10	17
20	Yugoslavia	5	17	16	38
21	United States	5	12	17	34
22	West Germany	4	9	12	25
23	Belarus	4	7	9	20
24	France	4	7	5	16
25	Ukraine	4	5	16	25
26	Kyrgyzstan	4	3	6	13
27	Egypt	3	2	5	10
28	East Germany	2	8	6	16
29	Uzbekistan	2	7	11	20
30	Czechoslovakia	2	4	9	15
31	Estonia	2	2	2	6
32	Denmark	1	5	7	13
33	Moldova	1	5	2	8
34	Norway	1	4	7	12
35	Italy	1	4	6	11
36	Russian Wrestling Federation (Note: At the 2021 World Championships, in accordance with a ban by the World Anti-Doping Agency (WADA), wrestlers from Russia were not permitted to use the Russian name, flag, or anthem. They instead participated under the name and the modified flag of the Russian Wrestling Federation (RWF).)	1	4	3	8
37	China	1	1	7	9
38	Israel	1	1	3	5
39	North Korea	1	0	3	4
40	Czech Republic	0	2	3	5
41	Lithuania	0	1	4	5
–	United World Wrestling (Note: At the 2025 World Championships, wrestlers from Belarus and Russia were not permitted to use the name, flag, or anthem of Russia. They instead participated under the name and the flag of the United World Wrestling (UWW), their medals were not included in the official medal table.)	0	1	4	5
42	Croatia	0	1	3	4
43	Lebanon	0	1	1	2
44	Latvia	0	1	0	1
44	Turkmenistan	0	1	0	1
46	Greece	0	0	6	6
–	Individual Neutral Athletes (Note: At the 2023 and 2024 World Championships, in accordance with sanctions imposed following by the 2022 Russian invasion of Ukraine, wrestlers from Russia were not permitted to use the name, flag, or anthem of Russia. They instead participated as "Individual Neutral Athletes (AIN)", their medals were not included in the official medal table.)	0	0	3	3
47	Austria	0	0	2	2
48	Belgium	0	0	1	1
48	Chile	0	0	1	1
48	India	0	0	1	1
48	Netherlands	0	0	1	1
48	Slovakia	0	0	1	1
48	Switzerland	0	0	1	1
48	Syria	0	0	1	1
Totals (54 entries)		500	494	647	1,641

- Names in italic are national entities that no longer exist.
