= Roland Gehrke =

East German wrestler (born 1954)

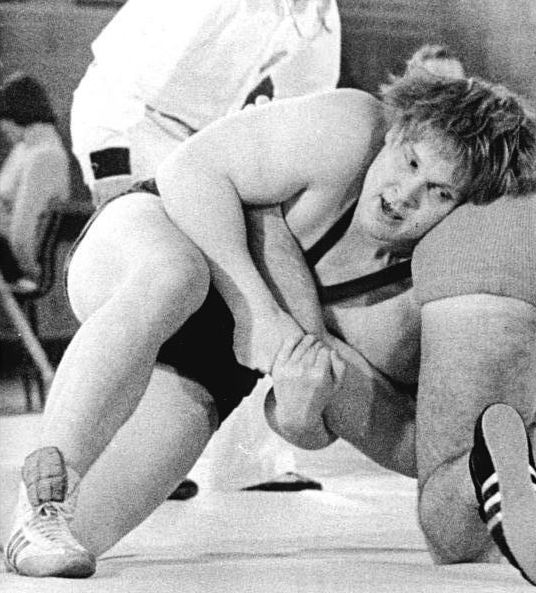
- Gehrke at the 1982 World Championships

Personal information
- Born: 17 January 1954 (age 72) Woldegk, Germany
- Height: 179 cm (5 ft 10 in)

Sport
- Sport: Freestyle wrestling
- Event: SG Dynamo Luckenwalde
Medal record
Representing East Germany
World Championships
Gold medal – first place	1981 Skopje	100 kg
Silver medal – second place	1975 Minsk	+100 kg
Silver medal – second place	1979 San Diego	+100 kg
Bronze medal – third place	1978 Mexico City	+100 kg
European Championships
Silver medal – second place	1976 Leningrad	+100 kg
Silver medal – second place	1979 Bucharest	+100 kg
Silver medal – second place	1983 Budapest	100 kg
Bronze medal – third place	1981 Gothenburg	100 kg

Roland Gehrke (born 17 January 1954) is a retired heavyweight freestyle wrestler from East Germany. Between 1975 and 1983 he won eight medals at the world and European championships, including a world title in 1981. He placed fourth at the 1976 and 1980 Summer Olympics and 1982 World Wrestling Championships.
