= Aleksandr Aliev =

Soviet wrestler

Personal information
- Native name: Александр Кисметович Алиев
- Born: April 25, 1955
- Weight: 68 kg (150 lb)

Sport
- Country: Soviet Union
- Sport: Greco-Roman wrestling
- Club: Armed forces (Moscow)
- Coached by: G. A. Vershinin; Nikolay Yakovenko.
Medal record
Men's Greco-Roman wrestling
World Wrestling Championships
Bronze medal – third place	1978 Mexico	68 kg
Silver medal – second place	1979 San Diego	68 kg
- Updated on 23 September 2016

Aleksandr Aliev (Russian: Александр Кисметович Алиев) is a Soviet Greco-Roman wrestler, champion and medalist of the USSR championships, medalist of World Wrestling Championships.

== Sport results ==
- 1977 USSR Greco-Roman Wrestling championship — (bronze) ;
- 1978 USSR Greco-Roman Wrestling championship — (bronze) ;
- 1979 USSR Greco-Roman Wrestling championship — (gold) ;
- Greco-Roman Wrestling at 1979 Soviet Spartakiad — (gold) .
