= Hideaki Tomiyama =

Japanese wrestler (born 1957)

Personal information
- Full name: Hideaki Tomiyama
- Born: 16 November 1957 (age 68) Ibaraki, Ibaraki Prefecture, Japan
- Occupation: Retired wrestler
- Height: 5 ft 3 in (160 cm)
- Weight: 126 lb (57 kg)

Sport
- Country: Japan
- Sport: wrestling
- Rank: Gold
- Event: 1984 Olympics
- Now coaching: 2004 Athens Olympics wrestling team
Medal record
Men's freestyle wrestling
Representing Japan
Olympic Games
Gold medal – first place	1984 Los Angeles	57 kg
World Championships
Gold medal – first place	1978 Mexico City	57 kg
Gold medal – first place	1979 San Diego	57 kg
Bronze medal – third place	1981 Skopje	57 kg
Silver medal – second place	1982 Edmonton	57 kg
Silver medal – second place	1983 Kiev	57 kg
Universiade
Silver medal – second place	1981 Bucharest	57 kg
Asian Games
Gold medal – first place	1978 Bangkok	57 kg
Gold medal – first place	1982 Delhi	57 kg

Hideaki Tomiyama (富山 英明, Tomiyama Hideaki; born November 16, 1957) represented Japan in wrestling at the 1984 Olympics in Los Angeles, and won the gold medal in the bantamweight division.

He later coached the 2004 Athens Olympics wrestling team. He is currently the head coach of the Nihon University wrestling team.
