= Hartmut Reich =

East German wrestler (born 1956)

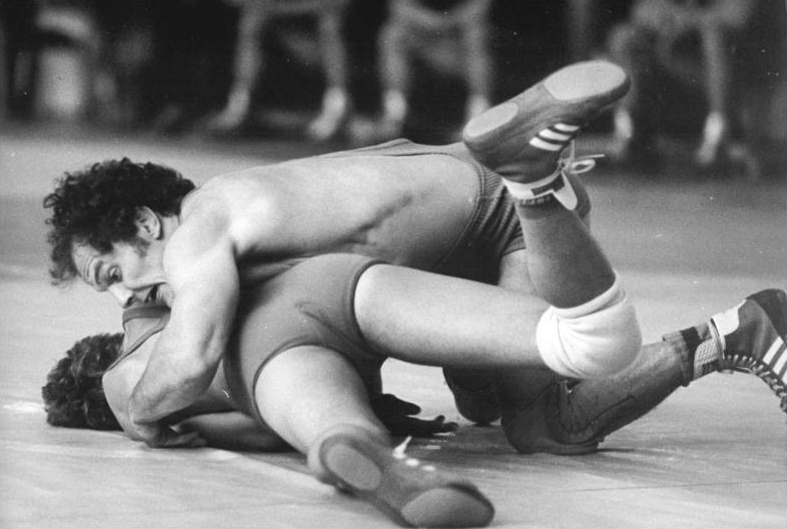
- Reich in 1982 (top)

Personal information
- Born: 7 May 1956 (age 70) Apolda, East Germany
- Height: 156 cm (5 ft 1 in)

Sport
- Sport: Freestyle wrestling
- Club: Tus Jena
- Coached by: Joachim Raupach
Medal record
Representing East Germany
World Championships
Silver medal – second place	1978 Mexico City	52 kg
Silver medal – second place	1981 Skopje	52 kg
Bronze medal – third place	1977 Lausanne	52 kg
Bronze medal – third place	1979 San Diego	52 kg
Bronze medal – third place	1982 Edmonton	52 kg
European Championships
Gold medal – first place	1977 Bursa	52 kg
Gold medal – first place	1981 Lodz	52 kg
Silver medal – second place	1979 Bucharest	52 kg
Bronze medal – third place	1976 Leningrad	52 kg

Hartmut Reich (born 7 May 1956) is a retired flyweight freestyle wrestler from East Germany. Between 1977 and 1982 he won five world championship medals, including a gold in 1982. He placed eighth at the 1980 Summer Olympics.

Reich retired around 1988 to become a physical education teacher.
