= Wrestling at the 1981 Summer Universiade =

The Wrestling competition in the 1981 Summer Universiade were held in Bucharest, Romania.

== Medal summary ==
=== Freestyle ===
Event	Gold	Silver	Bronze
48 kg	Toshiaki Ishikawa; Japan	Arshak Sanonyan; Soviet Union	Son Gab-do; South Korea
52 kg	Mitsuru Sato; Japan	Gheorghe Bîrcu; Romania	Kim Jong-kyu; South Korea
57 kg	Anatoly Beloglazov; Soviet Union	Hideaki Tomiyama; Japan	Aurel Neagu; Romania
62 kg	Viktor Alekseev; Soviet Union	Mike Land; United States	Dugarsürengiin Oyuunbold; Mongolia
68 kg	Raúl Cascaret; Cuba	You In-tak; South Korea	Boris Budaev; Soviet Union
74 kg	Georgy Makasarashvili; Soviet Union	Dave Schultz; United States	Kiro Ristov; Yugoslavia
82 kg	Vagab Kazibekov; Soviet Union	Ivan Yorgov; Bulgaria	Gheorghe Fodore; Romania
90 kg	Vladimir Batnia; Soviet Union	Clark Davis; Canada	Mitch Hull; United States
100 kg	Ilya Mate; Soviet Union	Venelin Atanasov; Bulgaria	Luis Miranda; Cuba
+100 kg	Bruce Baumgartner; United States	Sergey Stoychev; Bulgaria	Nikolay Skripkin; Soviet Union

=== Greco-Roman ===
Event	Gold	Silver	Bronze
48 kg	Temo Kasarashvili; Soviet Union	Constantin Alexandru; Romania	Hidekazu Okawa; Japan
52 kg	Benur Pashayan; Soviet Union	Nicu Gingă; Romania	Bang Dae-du; South Korea
57 kg	Niculae Zamfir; Romania	Kamil Fatkulin; Soviet Union	Petar Balov; Bulgaria
62 kg	Ion Păun; Romania	Gyrom Micharashvili; Soviet Union	Stefan Mikhailov; Bulgaria
68 kg	Ștefan Rusu; Romania	Mikhail Prokudin; Soviet Union	Nikolay Dimov; Bulgaria
74 kg	Aleksandr Kudryavtsev; Soviet Union	Gheorghe Ciobotaru; Romania	Peter Thätner; East Germany
82 kg	Ion Draica; Romania	Taymuraz Apkhazava; Soviet Union	Evgeni Stamov; Bulgaria
90 kg	Ilie Matei; Romania	Thomas Horschel; East Germany	Aleksandr Dubrovsky; Soviet Union
100 kg	Mikhail Saladze; Soviet Union	Vasile Andrei; Romania	Roman Wrocławski; Poland
+100 kg	Victor Dolipschi; Romania	Refik Memišević; Yugoslavia	Ivan Karapetyan; Soviet Union

== Medal table ==
Rank	Nation	Gold	Silver	Bronze	Total
1	Soviet Union	10	5	4	19
2	Romania	6	5	2	13
3	Japan	2	1	1	4
4	United States	1	2	1	4
5	Cuba	1	0	1	2
6	Bulgaria	0	3	4	7
7	South Korea	0	1	3	4
8	East Germany	0	1	1	2
8	Yugoslavia	0	1	1	2
10	Canada	0	1	0	1
11	Mongolia	0	0	1	1
11	Poland	0	0	1	1
Totals (12 entries)		20	20	20	60
