= Anatoly Beloglazov =

Russian freestyle wrestler

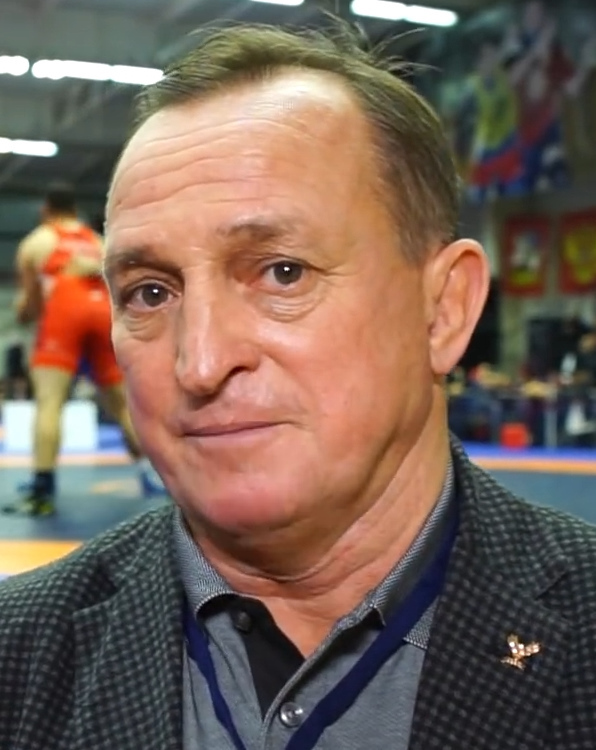
- Beloglazov in October 2020

Personal information
- Born: 16 September 1956 (age 69) Kaliningrad, Russia
- Height: 155 cm (5 ft 1 in)

Sport
- Sport: Freestyle wrestling
- Club: Dynamo Kiev
- Coached by: Granit Taropin
Medal record
Men's freestyle wrestling
Representing the Soviet Union
Olympic Games
Gold medal – first place	1980 Moscow	52 kg
World Championships
Gold medal – first place	1977 Lausanne	48 kg
Gold medal – first place	1978 Mexico City	52 kg
Gold medal – first place	1982 Edmonton	57 kg
Bronze medal – third place	1983 Kiev	52 kg
Summer Universiade
Gold medal – first place	1981 Bucharest	57 kg

Anatoly Alekseyevich Beloglazov (Russian: Анатолий Алексеевич Белоглазов; born 16 September 1956) is a retired Russian freestyle wrestler. He won gold medals at the 1980 Olympics and 1977, 1978 and 1982 World Championships, placing third in 1983. In 2010 he was inducted into the FILA Hall of Fame.

Beloglazov was born in Kaliningrad, but later moved to the south and graduated from an institute of pedagogy in Krasnodar. He spent most of his life alongside his twin brother Sergei, who also became Olympic champion in freestyle wrestling.

Beloglazov took up wrestling in 1968 and debuted internationally at the 1974 European Junior Championships, where he won a gold medal; next year he won the 1975 World Junior Championships, and in 1976 started competing among seniors, winning the European title that year. Domestically he won four Soviet titles: in 1977, 1979–80 and 1982. He retired from competitions after the 1984 season, missing the 1984 Olympics due to their boycott by the Soviet Union, and then had a long career as a wrestling coach. He headed the Canadian (1990–96), Australian (1996–98), and then Russian and Belarusian national freestyle teams. Since 1998, an annual freestyle wrestling tournament honoring the Beloglazov brothers has been held in Kaliningrad.
