= Taymuraz Apkhazava =

Georgian amateur wrestler

Personal information
- Native name: Теймураз Вахтангович Апхазава
- Born: 21 April 1955 (age 71) Kutaisi, Georgian SSR
- Weight: 82 kg (181 lb)

Sport
- Country: Soviet Union
- Sport: Greco-Roman wrestling
- Club: «Dynamo» (Kutaisi)
- Coached by: Iliya Bobokhidze
Medal record
Men's Greco-Roman wrestling
Wrestling World Championships
Gold medal – first place	1982 Katowice	82 kg
Gold medal – first place	1983 Kiev	82 kg
FILA Wrestling European Championships
Bronze medal – third place	1979 Bucharest	82 kg
Gold medal – first place	1983 Budapest	82 kg
Gold medal – first place	1984 Jönköping	82 kg
Bronze medal – third place	1986 Piraeus	82 kg
Friendship Games
Gold medal – first place	1984 Budapest	82 kg
Summer Universiade
Silver medal – second place	1981 Bucharest	82 kg
Bronze medal – third place	1977 Sofia	82 kg
- Updated on 26 September 2016

Taymuraz (Teymuraz) Apkhazava (Russian: Теймураз Вахтангович Апхазава; born 21 April 1955) is a Soviet former Greco-Roman wrestler, and Olympic gold medalist. He started to train in 1969, and took part in nine USSR championships and won some international tournaments.

== Sport results ==
- Greco-Roman Wrestling at 1979 Soviet Spartakiad - (silver) ;
- 1979 USSR Greco-Roman Wrestling championship - (bronze) ;
- 1980 USSR Greco-Roman Wrestling championship - (silver) ;
- 1982 USSR Greco-Roman Wrestling championship - (bronze) ;
- 1984 USSR Greco-Roman Wrestling championship - (gold) ;
- 1986 USSR Greco-Roman Wrestling championship - (silver) ;
- Greco-Roman Wrestling at 1983 Soviet Spartakiad - (bronze) ;
