= Wrestling at the 1977 Summer Universiade =

The Wrestling competition in the 1977 Summer Universiade were held in Sofia, Bulgaria. It was added as the only optional sport chosen by the host country.

== Freestyle Wrestling ==
Event	Gold	Silver	Bronze
48 Kilograms	Nobuo Fujisawa (JPN)	Stoyan Stoyanov (BUL)	Ochirdolgoryn Enkhtaivan (MGL)
52 Kilograms	Kazuo Shimizu (JPN)	Roman Dmitriyev (URS)	Gheorghe Bircu (ROM)
57 Kilograms	Gurgen Baghdasaryan (URS)	Tsutomu Sato (JPN)	Dariush Vaezi (IRI)
62 Kilograms	Miho Dukov (BUL)	Tsuneo Taga (JPN)	Gigel Anghel (ROM)
68 Kilograms	Kostadin Trahykov (BUL)	Nikolay Petrenko (URS)	Shaban Sejdiu (YUG)
74 Kilograms	Wade Schalles (USA)	Musa Abdulmuslimov (URS)	Jamtsyn Davaajav (MGL)
82 Kilograms	Zevegiin Düvchin (MGL)	Eduard Fatikov (URS)	Ismail Abilov (BUL)
90 Kilograms	Shukri Ahmedov (BUL)	Khasan Ortsuyev (URS)	Ion Ivanov (ROM)
100 Kilograms	Khadzhimurat Magomedov (URS)	Georgi Raykov (BUL)	Vasile Pușcașu (ROM)
Over 100 Kilograms	Salman Khasimikov (URS)	Marin Gertchev (BUL)	Ladislau Șimon (ROM)

== Greco-Roman Wrestling ==
Event	Gold	Silver	Bronze
48 Kilograms	Constantin Alexandru (ROM)	Anatoly Bozin (URS)	Pavel Hristov (BUL)
52 Kilograms	Vakhtang Blagidze (URS)	Nicu Gingă (ROM)	Mehmet Karadağ (TUR)
57 Kilograms	Asen Milev (BUL)	Vladimir Pogodin (URS)	Nicolae Horinceanu (ROM)
62 Kilograms	Ion Păun (ROM)	Ivan Frgić (YUG)	Kadyrbek Dyushembiyev (URS)
68 Kilograms	Kostadin Trahykov (BUL)	Ștefan Rusu (ROM)	Andrzej Supron (POL)
74 Kilograms	Yanko Shopov (BUL)	Gheorghe Ciobotaru (ROM)	Aleksandr Baranov (URS)
82 Kilograms	Ion Draica (ROM)	Dimitar Ivanov (BUL)	Taymuraz Apkhazava (URS)
90 Kilograms	Viktor Avdishev (URS)	Darko Nisavic (YUG)	Petre Dicu (ROM)
100 Kilograms	Georgi Raykov (BUL)	Mikhail Saladze (URS)	Antal Bodó (HUN)
Over 100 Kilograms	Aleksandar Tomov (BUL)	Avtandil Maisuradze (URS)	Ralph Zigner (USA)

== Medal table ==
Rank	Nation	Gold	Silver	Bronze	Total
1	Bulgaria (BUL)	8	4	2	14
2	Soviet Union (URS)	5	9	3	17
3	Romania (ROM)	3	3	7	13
4	Japan (JPN)	2	2	0	4
5	Mongolia (MGL)	1	0	2	3
6	United States (USA)	1	0	1	2
7	Yugoslavia (YUG)	0	2	1	3
8	Hungary (HUN)	0	0	1	1
8	Iran (IRI)	0	0	1	1
8	Poland (POL)	0	0	1	1
8	Turkey (TUR)	0	0	1	1
Totals (11 entries)		20	20	20	60
