= 1979 World Wrestling Championships =

- Host city: San Diego, United States
- Dates: 21–28 August 1979
- Stadium: San Diego State University

Champions
- Freestyle: Soviet Union
- Greco-Roman: Soviet Union

The 1979 World Wrestling Championships were held in San Diego, California, United States from 21 to 28 August 1979.

== Medal table ==
Rank	Nation	Gold	Silver	Bronze	Total
1	Soviet Union	9	5	2	16
2	Hungary	4	1	0	5
3	Bulgaria	2	2	3	7
4	Japan	2	2	1	5
5	United States	1	5	4	10
6	Romania	1	0	2	3
7	Poland	1	0	1	2
7	Sweden	1	0	1	2
9	East Germany	0	2	2	4
10	West Germany	0	1	3	4
11	Yugoslavia	0	1	0	1
12	Italy	0	0	1	1
Totals (12 entries)		21	19	20	60

== Team ranking ==
Rank	Men's freestyle		Men's Greco-Roman	
Rank	Team	Points	Team	Points
1	Soviet Union	50	Soviet Union	43
2	United States	35	Hungary	30
3	East Germany	21	Bulgaria	27
4	Japan	19.25	United States	17
5	Bulgaria	19	West Germany	17
6	Poland	13.5	Romania	15

== Medal summary ==
=== Freestyle ===
Event	Gold	Silver	Bronze
48 kg	Sergey Kornilaev; Soviet Union	Bobby Weaver; United States	Jan Falandys; Poland
52 kg	Yuji Takada; Japan	James Haines; United States	Hartmut Reich; East Germany
57 kg	Hideaki Tomiyama; Japan	Sergey Beloglazov; Soviet Union	Joe Corso; United States
62 kg	Vladimir Yumin; Soviet Union	Miho Dukov; Bulgaria	Andre Metzger; United States
68 kg	Mikhail Kharachura; Soviet Union	Akira Miyahara; Japan	Eberhard Probst; East Germany
74 kg	Leroy Kemp; United States	Martin Knosp; West Germany	Nikolay Petrenko; Soviet Union
82 kg	István Kovács; Hungary	John Peterson; United States	Magomedkhan Aratsilov; Soviet Union
90 kg	Khasan Ortsuev; Soviet Union	Uwe Neupert; East Germany	Ivan Ginov; Bulgaria
100 kg	Ilya Mate; Soviet Union	Russ Hellickson; United States	Vasile Pușcașu; Romania
+100 kg	Salman Khasimikov; Soviet Union	Roland Gehrke; East Germany	Andrei Ianko; Romania

=== Greco-Roman ===
Event	Gold	Silver	Bronze
48 kg	Constantin Alexandru; Romania	Aleksey Shumakov; Soviet Union	Pavel Hristov; Bulgaria
52 kg	Lajos Rácz; Hungary	Kamil Fatkulin; Soviet Union	Toshio Asakura; Japan
57 kg	Shamil Serikov; Soviet Union	Kiwamu Kashiwagi; Japan	Antonino Caltabiano; Italy
62 kg	István Tóth; Hungary	Abdurrahim Kuzu; United States	Lars Malmkvist; Sweden
68 kg	Andrzej Supron; Poland	Aleksandr Aliev; Soviet Union	Erich Klaus; West Germany
74 kg	Yanko Shopov; Bulgaria	Shared gold	Karl-Heinz Helbing; West Germany
74 kg	Ferenc Kocsis; Hungary	Shared gold	Karl-Heinz Helbing; West Germany
82 kg	Gennady Korban; Soviet Union	Momir Petković; Yugoslavia	Pavel Pavlov; Bulgaria
90 kg	Frank Andersson; Sweden	Norbert Növényi; Hungary	Pedro Pawlidis; West Germany
100 kg	Nikolay Balboshin; Soviet Union	Georgi Raykov; Bulgaria	Brad Rheingans; United States
+100 kg	Aleksandar Tomov; Bulgaria	Aleksandr Kolchinsky; Soviet Union	Bob Walker; United States
