= Zevegiin Düvchin =

Mongolian wrestler (born 1955)

Personal information
- Nationality: Mongolian
- Born: 7 February 1955 (age 71) Kharkhorin, Mongolia

Sport
- Sport: Freestyle Wrestling
- Weight class: 82 kg
Medal record
Men's freestyle wrestling
Representing Mongolia
World Championships
Silver medal – second place	1983 Kiev	82 kg
World Cup
Gold medal – first place	1987 Ulaanbaatar	90 kg
Asian Games
Gold medal – first place	1982 New Delhi	82 kg
World University Games
Gold medal – first place	1977 Sofia	82 kg
Aleksandr Medved Grand Prix
Gold medal – first place	1981 Minsk	82 kg

Zevegiin Düvchin (born 7 February 1955) is a Mongolian wrestler. He competed at the 1976 Summer Olympics, the 1980 Summer Olympics and the 1988 Summer Olympics.
