= 1978 World Wrestling Championships =

Wrestling championships in both Greco-Roman and Freestyle for men

- Host city: Mexico City, Mexico
- Dates: 20–27 August 1978

Champions
- Freestyle: Soviet Union
- Greco-Roman: Soviet Union

The 1978 World Wrestling Championships were held in Mexico City, Mexico. Greco-Roman event on 20–23, and freestyle on 24–27 August respectively.

== Medal table ==
Rank	Nation	Gold	Silver	Bronze	Total
1	Soviet Union	12	4	4	20
2	Romania	3	1	2	6
3	East Germany	2	1	1	4
4	Bulgaria	1	2	1	4
5	Japan	1	2	0	3
6	United States	1	0	1	2
7	Iran	0	2	2	4
8	Poland	0	2	1	3
8	Yugoslavia	0	2	1	3
10	Sweden	0	1	1	2
10	West Germany	0	1	1	2
12	Hungary	0	1	0	1
12	South Korea	0	1	0	1
14	Cuba	0	0	2	2
15	Greece	0	0	1	1
15	Mongolia	0	0	1	1
15	Turkey	0	0	1	1
Totals (17 entries)		20	20	20	60

== Team ranking ==
Rank	Men's freestyle		Men's Greco-Roman	
Rank	Team	Points	Team	Points
1	Soviet Union	55	Soviet Union	53
2	East Germany	22	Romania	36
3	Iran	19	Bulgaria	30
4	Bulgaria	18.5	Poland	23
5	Japan	18	Yugoslavia	15
6	United States	17.5	West Germany	11
7	Mongolia	10	Sweden	9
8	West Germany	9	Hungary	9
9	Turkey	9	United States	7
10	Cuba	8	Greece	6

== Medal summary ==
=== Freestyle ===
Event	Gold	Silver	Bronze
48 kg	Sergey Kornilaev; Soviet Union	Nobuo Fujisawa; Japan	Mohammad Bazmavar; Iran
52 kg	Anatoly Beloglazov; Soviet Union	Hartmut Reich; East Germany	Luis Ocaña; Cuba
57 kg	Hideaki Tomiyama; Japan	Buzay Ibragimov; Soviet Union	Dugarsürengiin Oyuunbold; Mongolia
62 kg	Vladimir Yumin; Soviet Union	Yang Jung-mo; South Korea	Mohammad Rezaei; Iran
68 kg	Pavel Pinigin; Soviet Union	Akira Miyahara; Japan	Ivan Yankov; Bulgaria
74 kg	Leroy Kemp; United States	Mohammad Hossein Mohebbi; Iran	Petru Marta; Soviet Union
82 kg	Magomedkhan Aratsilov; Soviet Union	Adolf Seger; West Germany	John Peterson; United States
90 kg	Uwe Neupert; East Germany	Anatoly Prokopchuk; Soviet Union	İsmail Temiz; Turkey
100 kg	Harald Büttner; East Germany	Levan Tediashvili; Soviet Union	Bárbaro Morgan; Cuba
+100 kg	Soslan Andiyev; Soviet Union	Reza Soukhtehsaraei; Iran	Roland Gehrke; East Germany

=== Greco-Roman ===
Event	Gold	Silver	Bronze
48 kg	Constantin Alexandru; Romania	Aleksey Shumakov; Soviet Union	Roman Kierpacz; Poland
52 kg	Vakhtang Blagidze; Soviet Union	Nicu Gingă; Romania	Charalambos Cholidis; Greece
57 kg	Shamil Serikov; Soviet Union	Ivan Frgić; Yugoslavia	Pasquale Passarelli; West Germany
62 kg	Boris Kramarenko; Soviet Union	Kazimierz Lipień; Poland	Lars Malmkvist; Sweden
68 kg	Ștefan Rusu; Romania	Andrzej Supron; Poland	Aleksandr Aliev; Soviet Union
74 kg	Arif Niftullayev; Soviet Union	Ferenc Kocsis; Hungary	Gheorghe Ciobotaru; Romania
82 kg	Ion Draica; Romania	Momir Petković; Yugoslavia	Vladimir Cheboksarov; Soviet Union
90 kg	Stoyan Nikolov; Bulgaria	Frank Andersson; Sweden	Viktor Avdyshev; Soviet Union
100 kg	Nikolay Balboshin; Soviet Union	Georgi Raykov; Bulgaria	Refik Memišević; Yugoslavia
+100 kg	Aleksandr Kolchinsky; Soviet Union	Nikola Dinev; Bulgaria	Roman Codreanu; Romania
