= 1983 World Wrestling Championships =

- Host city: Kyiv, Soviet Union
- Dates: 22–29 September 1983

Champions
- Freestyle: Soviet Union
- Greco-Roman: Soviet Union

The 1983 World Wrestling Championships were held in Kiev, Soviet Union (present-day Ukraine), in three amateur wrestling styles, recognized by FILA. Greco-Roman style wrestling competition was contested 22–25 September, freestyle wrestlers competed 26–29 September, Sambo wrestlers competed 30 September — 1 October.

== Medal table ==
Rank	Nation	Gold	Silver	Bronze	Total
1	Soviet Union	12	3	4	19
2	Bulgaria	3	3	8	14
3	Finland	2	0	1	3
4	United States	1	2	1	4
5	Japan	1	2	0	3
6	North Korea	1	0	0	1
7	Poland	0	2	1	3
8	Mongolia	0	2	0	2
9	East Germany	0	1	1	2
9	West Germany	0	1	1	2
9	Yugoslavia	0	1	1	2
12	Iran	0	1	0	1
12	Sweden	0	1	0	1
12	Turkey	0	1	0	1
15	Cuba	0	0	1	1
15	Hungary	0	0	1	1
Totals (16 entries)		20	20	20	60

== Team ranking ==
Rank	Men's freestyle		Men's Greco-Roman	
Rank	Team	Points	Team	Points
1	Soviet Union	56	Soviet Union	47
2	Bulgaria	34	Bulgaria	34
3	United States	22	Finland	19
4	Japan	16	Poland	14
5	Mongolia	15	Hungary	14
6	Poland	11	Japan	11

== Medal summary ==
=== Freestyle ===
Event	Gold	Silver	Bronze
48 kg	Kim Chol-han; North Korea	Aleksandr Dorzhu; Soviet Union	Jan Falandys; Poland
52 kg	Valentin Yordanov; Bulgaria	Toshio Asakura; Japan	Anatoly Beloglazov; Soviet Union
57 kg	Sergey Beloglazov; Soviet Union	Hideaki Tomiyama; Japan	Stefan Ivanov; Bulgaria
62 kg	Viktor Alekseev; Soviet Union	Lee Roy Smith; United States	Simeon Shterev; Bulgaria
68 kg	Arsen Fadzaev; Soviet Union	Buyandelgeriin Bold; Mongolia	Kamen Penev; Bulgaria
74 kg	Dave Schultz; United States	Taram Magomadov; Soviet Union	Martin Knosp; West Germany
82 kg	Taymuraz Dzgoev; Soviet Union	Zevegiin Düvchin; Mongolia	Efraim Kamberov; Bulgaria
90 kg	Piotr Naniev; Soviet Union	Ivan Ginov; Bulgaria	Uwe Neupert; East Germany
100 kg	Aslan Khadartsev; Soviet Union	Greg Gibson; United States	Georgi Yanchev; Bulgaria
+100 kg	Salman Khasimikov; Soviet Union	Adam Sandurski; Poland	Bruce Baumgartner; United States

=== Greco-Roman ===
Event	Gold	Silver	Bronze
48 kg	Bratan Tsenov; Bulgaria	Markus Scherer; West Germany	Temo Kasarashvili; Soviet Union
52 kg	Benur Pashayan; Soviet Union	Erol Kemah; Turkey	Lyubomir Tsekov; Bulgaria
57 kg	Masaki Eto; Japan	Kamil Fatkulin; Soviet Union	Petar Balov; Bulgaria
62 kg	Hannu Lahtinen; Finland	Günter Reichelt; East Germany	Zhivko Vangelov; Bulgaria
68 kg	Tapio Sipilä; Finland	Mohammad Bana; Iran	Gennady Ermilov; Soviet Union
74 kg	Mikhail Mamiashvili; Soviet Union	Andrzej Supron; Poland	Karolj Kasap; Yugoslavia
82 kg	Taymuraz Apkhazava; Soviet Union	Lennart Lundell; Sweden	Jarmo Övermark; Finland
90 kg	Igor Kanygin; Soviet Union	Atanas Komchev; Bulgaria	Norbert Növényi; Hungary
100 kg	Andrey Dimitrov; Bulgaria	Jožef Tertei; Yugoslavia	Viktor Avdyshev; Soviet Union
+100 kg	Evgeny Artyukhin; Soviet Union	Nikola Dinev; Bulgaria	Cándido Mesa; Cuba
