= Ion Păun =

Romanian wrestler (born 1951)

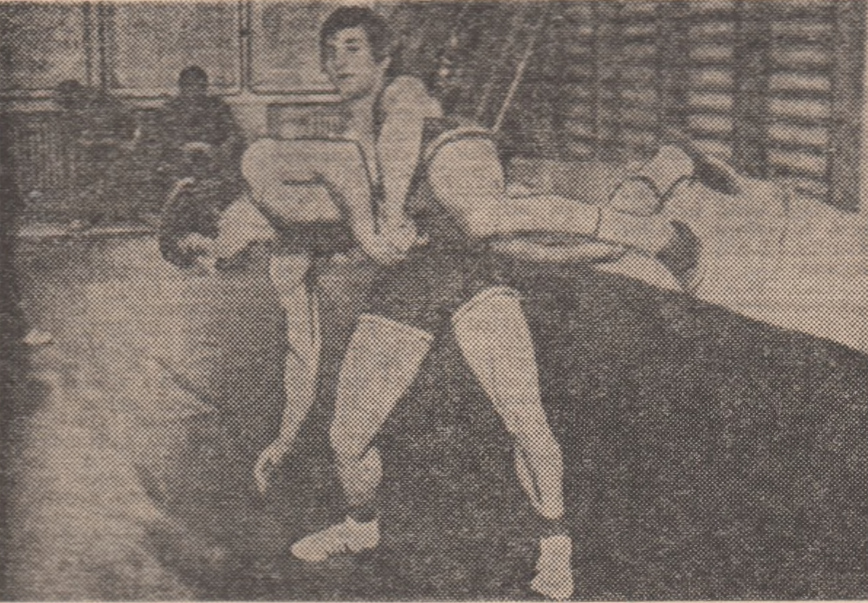
- Ion Pãun in 1979

Personal information
- Born: 17 February 1951 (age 75) Drăganu, Romania

Sport
- Sport: Wrestling
Medal record
Representing Romania
World Championships
Bronze medal – third place	1977 Lausanne	-62kg
European Championships
Silver medal – second place	1976 Leningrad	-62kg
Silver medal – second place	1978 Sofia	-62kg
Bronze medal – third place	1974 Madrid	-62kg
Bronze medal – third place	1980 Prievidza	-62kg
Summer Universiade
Gold medal – first place	1977 Sofia	-62kg
Gold medal – first place	1981 Bucharest	-62kg
Silver medal – second place	1973 Moscow	-52kg

Ion Păun (born 17 February 1951) is a Romanian former wrestler who competed in the 1972 Summer Olympics, in the 1976 Summer Olympics, and in the 1980 Summer Olympics.
