= Aleksandr Kolchinsky =

Ukrainian wrestler

Oleksandr Kolchynskyy

Personal information
- Born: Oleksandr Leonidovych Kolchynskyy; February 20, 1955 Kyiv, Ukrainian SSR, Soviet Union
- Died: July 16, 2002 (aged 47) Kyiv, Ukraine
- Height: 193 cm (6 ft 4 in)
- Weight: 119 kg (262 lb)

Sport
- Sport: Greco-Roman wrestling
- Club: Soviet Army, Kiev
Medal record
Representing the Soviet Union
Men's Greco-Roman wrestling
Olympic Games
Gold medal – first place	1976 Montreal	+100 kg
Gold medal – first place	1980 Moscow	+110 kg
World Championships
Gold medal – first place	1978 Mexico City	+100 kg
Silver medal – second place	1975 Minsk	+100 kg
Silver medal – second place	1977 Gothenburg	+100 kg
Silver medal – second place	1979 San Diego	+100 kg
World Cup
Gold medal – first place	1980 Trelleborg	+100 kg
European Championships
Silver medal – second place	1976 Leningrad	+100 kg
Silver medal – second place	1977 Bursa	+100 kg
Bronze medal – third place	1975 Ludwigshafen	+100 kg
Junior World Championships
Silver medal – second place	1971 Tokyo	+87 kg
Silver medal – second place	1973 Miami	+100 kg
Junior European Championships
Gold medal – first place	1974 Haparanda	+100 kg

Oleksandr Leonidovych Kolchynskyy (Ukrainian: Олександр Леонідович Колчинський; 20 February 1955 – 16 July 2002) was a Soviet Ukrainian heavyweight Greco-Roman wrestler of Jewish-Ukrainian descent. He won Olympic gold medals in 1976 and 1980 and a world title in 1978, placing second in 1975, 1977 and 1979. Most Olympic wins came by way of pin.

== Career ==
Kolchynskiy took up wrestling in 1966, and in 1974 was included to the Soviet national team after winning his first Soviet title. He won five more national championships in a row in 1976–80 and would be a favorite at the 1984 Olympics, considering that he previously defeated the would-be 1984 Olympic champion Jeff Blatnick in the finale of the 1980 World Cup. But the Games were eventually boycotted by the Soviet Union, ending any aspirations for Kolchinsky participation.

Viktor Igumenov, Soviet National Team Coach, later told that Kolchinsky was rowdy and extremely lazy athlete, zero-discipline hooligan with little or no motivation for sports, but at the same time an remarkably talented wrestler, with springy and flexible body, gifted with a lightweight speed packed in a large, heavyweight frame.

== Retirement and later years ==
Kolchynsky retired in the early 1980s, and in 1983 moved to Tashkent, Uzbek SSR, where he opened a small sewing shop together with his wife. Later he became involved with Ukrainian organized crime and in 1994 was sentenced to seven years of prison for extortion. He was paroled in 1996 by Leonid Kuchma and became a wrestling coach for teenagers. He died of a heart attack in 2002, aged 47. Earlier in 1998, an annual Greco-Roman wrestling tournament in his honor has been launched in his native city of Kyiv.
