= Vakhtang Blagidze =

Soviet wrestler (born 1954)

Personal information
- Born: July 23, 1954 (age 71) Ozurgeti, Soviet Union

Sport
- Sport: Greco-Roman wrestling
Medal record
Representing the Soviet Union
Olympic Games
Gold medal – first place	1980 Moscow	Flyweight
World Championships
Gold medal – first place	1978 Mexico City	-52 kg
Gold medal – first place	1981 Oslo	-52 kg
Summer Universiade
Gold medal – first place	1977 Sofia	-52 kg
European Championships
Gold medal – first place	1978 Sofia	-52 kg
Gold medal – first place	1980 Prievidza	-52 kg

Vakhtang Blagidze (Georgian: ვახტანგ ბლაგიძე ; born July 23, 1954) is a wrestler from Ozurgeti, Georgia. He was Olympic gold medalist in Greco-Roman wrestling in 1980, competing for the Soviet Union. He won gold medals at the 1978 and 1981 World Wrestling Championships.
