= Gennady Sapunov =

Russian wrestler (1938–2023)

Personal information
- Born: 5 December 1938 Muysky District, Buryat ASSR, Russian SFSR, USSR
- Died: 30 August 2023 (aged 84)

Sport
- Sport: Greco-Roman wrestling
Medal record
Men's wrestling (Greco-Roman)
Representing Soviet Union
World Championships
Gold medal – first place	1963 Helsingborg	-63 kg
Gold medal – first place	1965 Manchester	-63 kg
Silver medal – second place	1966 Toledo	-70 kg

Gennady Andreyevich Sapunov (Russian: Геннадий Андреевич Сапунов; 5 December 1938 – 30 August 2023) was a Russian Greco-Roman wrestler. He competed in the 1968 Olympics and won two gold and a silver medal at the World Wrestling Championships. From 1979 to 1990 he was the trainer for the Soviet Greco-Roman wrestling team. Sapunov died on 30 August 2023, at the age of 84.
