= Pavel Hristov =

Bulgarian wrestler (born 1951)

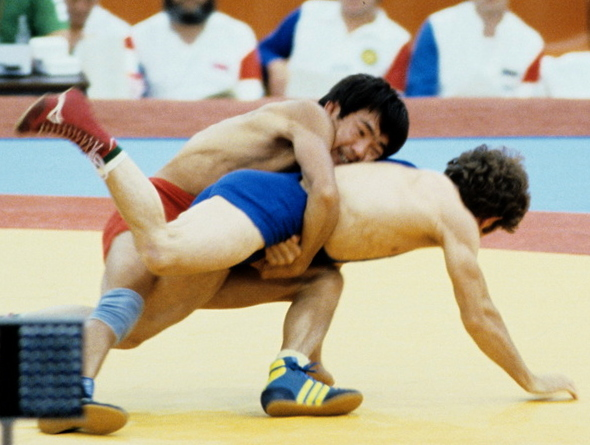
- Hristov (right) at the 1980 Olympics

Personal information
- Born: 3 February 1951 (age 75) Kapitan Andreevo, Haskovo, Bulgaria
- Height: 154 cm (5 ft 1 in)
- Weight: 48 kg (106 lb)

Sport
- Sport: Greco-Roman wrestling
Medal record
Representing Bulgaria
World Championships
Bronze medal – third place	1979 San Diego	-48 kg
European Championships
Silver medal – second place	1973 Helsinki	-48 kg
Silver medal – second place	1979 Bucharest	-48 kg
Summer Universiade
Bronze medal – third place	1977 Sofia	-48 kg

Pavel Hristov Ivanov (Bulgarian: Павел Христов Иванов; born 3 February 1951) is a retired light-flyweight Greco-Roman wrestler from Bulgaria who won two silver and one bronze medals at the European and world championships in 1973–1979. He competed at the 1980 Summer Olympics and placed fourth.
