= Nikola Dinev =

Bulgarian wrestler and sambo practitioner (1953–2019)

Personal information
- Born: 18 October 1953 Nova Zagora, Bulgaria
- Died: 1 June 2019 (aged 65)
- Height: 184 cm (6 ft 0 in)
- Weight: 130 kg (287 lb)

Sport
- Sport: Greco-Roman wrestling, freestyle wrestling, Sambo wrestling
- Club: Beroe, Stara Zagora
Medal record
Representing Bulgaria
Men's Greco-Roman wrestling
Friendship Games
| Gold medal – first place | 1984 Budapest | +100 kg |
World Championships
| Gold medal – first place | 1977 Gothenburg | +100 kg |
| Silver medal – second place | 1978 Mexico City | +100 kg |
| Silver medal – second place | 1981 Oslo | +100 kg |
| Gold medal – first place | 1982 Katowice | +100 kg |
| Silver medal – second place | 1983 Kiev | +100 kg |
Junior World Championships
| Gold medal – first place | 1973 Miami Beach | +100 kg |
European Championships
| Silver medal – second place | 1975 Ludwigshafen | +100 kg |
| Gold medal – first place | 1977 Bursa | +100 kg |
| Gold medal – first place | 1980 Prievidza | +100 kg |
| Gold medal – first place | 1982 Varna | +100 kg |
| Gold medal – first place | 1983 Budapest | +100 kg |
| Gold medal – first place | 1986 Athens | -130 kg |
Balkan Games
| Silver medal – second place | 1974 Gorna Oriahovitza | +100 kg youth |
Men's Sambo
World Championships
| Silver medal – second place | 1975 Minsk | +100 kg |

Nikola Dinev Nikolov (Bulgarian: Никола Динев Николов; 18 October 1953 – 1 June 2019) was a Bulgarian super-heavyweight Greco-Roman and freestyle wrestler, and Sambist who won two world and five European GR titles between 1977 and 1986. He placed fifth at the super-heavyweight freestyle event of the 1976 Summer Olympics.
