= Aleksey Shumakov =

Russian wrestler (born 1948)

Personal information
- Full name: Aleksey Vasilyevich Shumakov
- Nationality: Russian
- Born: 7 September 1948 (age 77) Pochyot, Krasnoyarsk Krai, Russian SFSR, Soviet Union
- Height: 152 cm (5 ft 0 in)
- Weight: 48 kg (106 lb)

Sport
- Sport: Wrestling
Medal record
Men's Greco-Roman wrestling
Representing the Soviet Union
Olympic Games
Gold medal – first place	1976 Montreal	Light flyweight
Summer Universiade
Silver medal – second place	1973 Moscow	Light flyweight
World Championships
Silver medal – second place	1978 Mexico City	Light flyweight
Silver medal – second place	1979 San Diego	Light flyweight

Aleksey Vasilyevich Shumakov (Russian: Алексе́й Васи́льевич Шумако́в; born 7 September 1948) is a Russian wrestler. He was Olympic gold medalist in Greco-Roman wrestling in 1976, competing for the Soviet Union.
