= Benur Pashayan =

Soviet Armenian Greco-Roman wrestler (1959–2019)

Personal information
- Born: 13 February 1959 Azavreti, Soviet Georgia
- Died: 13 December 2019 (aged 60) Yerevan
- Weight: 52 kg (115 lb)

Sport
- Sport: Wrestling
- Event: Greco-Roman
- Club: Dynamo Yerevan
- Coached by: Albert Mnatsakanyan; Harutyun Khachatryan
Medal record
Men's Greco-Roman wrestling
Representing Soviet Union
Friendship Games
Gold medal – first place	1984 Budapest	52 kg
World Championships
Gold medal – first place	1982 Katowice	52 kg
Gold medal – first place	1983 Kiev	52 kg
European Championships
Gold medal – first place	1981 Gothenburg	52 kg
Gold medal – first place	1982 Varna	52 kg
Universiade
Gold medal – first place	1981 Bucharest	52 kg

Benur Pashayan (Armenian: Բենուր Փաշայան; 13 February 1959 – 13 December 2019) was a Soviet Armenian Greco-Roman wrestler. He was a two-time World, European, and Soviet Champion. Pashayan also won a gold medal at the 1984 Friendship Games during the Olympic boycott.

== Biography ==
Benur Pashayan was born on 13 February 1959 in the village of Azavret within the Akhalkalak region of the Georgian SSR. He began Greco-Roman wrestling in Yerevan under the direction of Albert Mnatsakanyan and Harutyun Khachatryan. In 1977 and 1979 he became the Junior World Champion.

Pashayan was a 1981 Summer Universiade Champion, a two-time European Champion, having won consecutive gold medals at the 1981 and 1982 European Wrestling Championships, and a two-time and reigning World Champion, having also won consecutive gold medals at the 1982 and 1983 World Wrestling Championships. For 1983, he was recognized by the FILA as the best Greco-Roman wrestler.

Having been ranked first in his weight class the past two years, he was the gold medal favorite of the Greco-Roman flyweight (52 kg) division at the 1984 Summer Olympics. However, because of the 1984 Summer Olympics boycott, Pashayan was denied participation. Instead, he and the other Soviet and Soviet-affiliated athletes competed at the 1984 Friendship Games. Benur won a gold medal in wrestling at the Games.

He later participated at the Grand Prix of Germany in 1984 and 1985, having previously won the competition in 1982. Pashayan came in first place every time at the contest. He retired in 1985, undefeated in international competition.

From 1986 to 1989 he was the coach in Soviet Armenia, and in 1989 he graduated from the Armenian State Institute of Physical Culture. Pashayan later became the President of the National Olympic Committee of Armenia from 1999 to 2000.
