= Georgi Raykov =

Bulgarian wrestler (1953–2006)

Personal information
- Born: 18 October 1953 Sofia, Bulgaria
- Died: 12 August 2006 (aged 52) Koprivshtitsa, Bulgaria

Sport
- Sport: Greco-Roman wrestling
Medal record
Representing Bulgaria
Olympic Games
Gold medal – first place	1980 Moscow	100 kg
World Championships
Silver medal – second place	1978 Mexico City	100 kg
Silver medal – second place	1979 San Diego	100 kg
Bronze medal – third place	1977 Gothenburg	100 kg
European Championships
Gold medal – first place	1980 Prievidza	100 kg
Silver medal – second place	1977 Bursa	100 kg
Silver medal – second place	1978 Sofia	100 kg
Summer Universiade
Silver medal – second place	1977 Sofia	100 kg

Georgi Petkov Raykov (Bulgarian: Георги Райков) (October 18, 1953 – August 12, 2006) was a Bulgarian wrestler. He was born in Sofia. He won an Olympic gold medal in Greco-Roman wrestling in 1980. He won silver medals at the 1978 and 1979 World Wrestling Championships.
