= Mikhail Mamiashvili =

Russian wrestler of Georgian origin (born 1963)

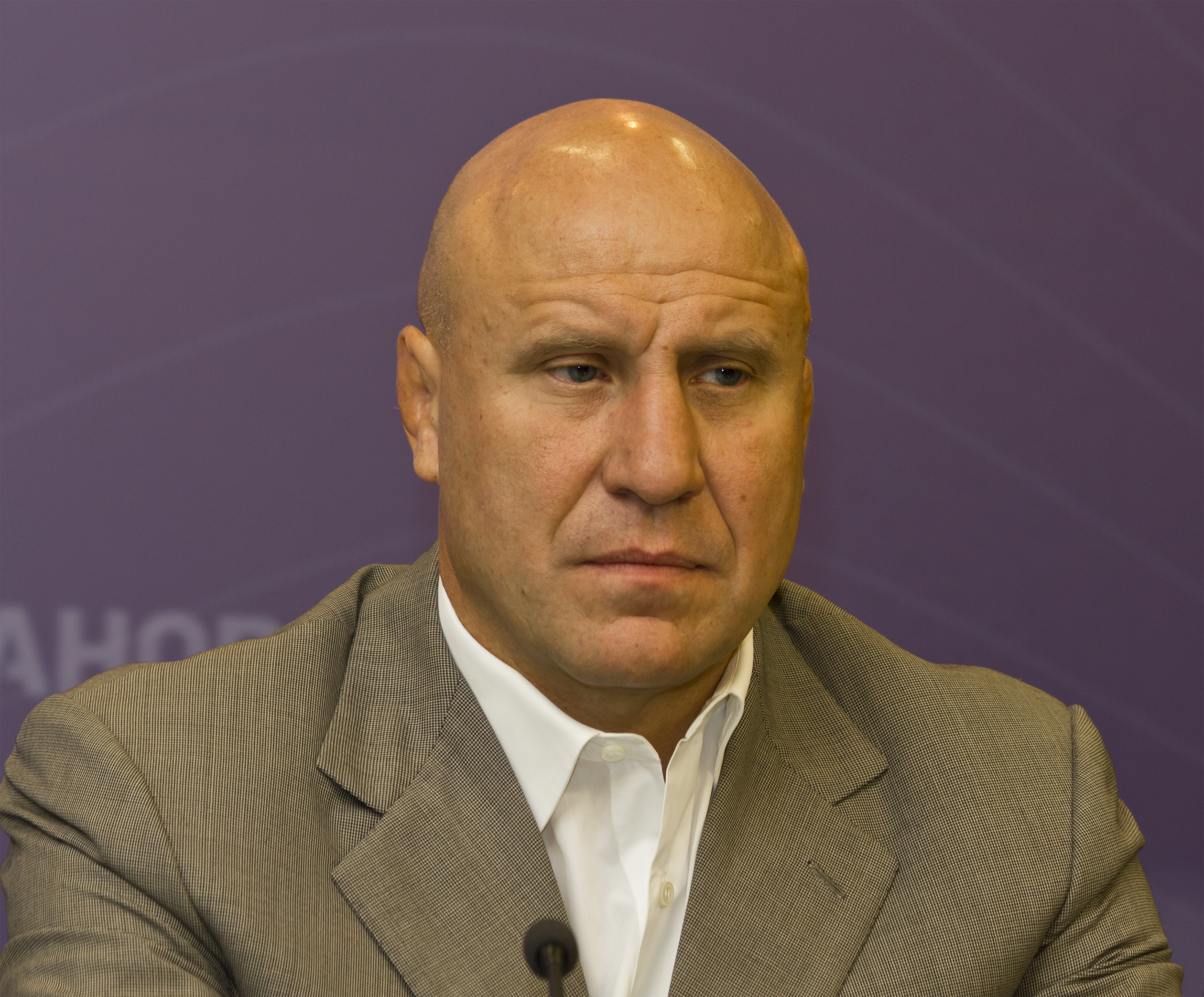
- Mamiashvili in 2013

Medal record

Men's Greco-Roman wrestling

Representing the Soviet Union

Olympic Games
Gold medal – first place	1988 Seoul	Middleweight

World Championships
Gold medal – first place	1983 Kiev	Middleweight
Gold medal – first place	1985 Kolbotn	Middleweight
Gold medal – first place	1986 Budapest	Middleweight
Silver medal – second place	1989 Martigny	Middleweight
Silver medal – second place	1990 Ostia	Middleweight

European Championships
Gold medal – first place	1986 Piraeus	Welterweight
Gold medal – first place	1988 Kolbotn	Middleweight
Gold medal – first place	1989 Oulu	Middleweight

Mikhail Mamiashvili (born 21 November 1963 in Konotop, Ukrainian SSR) is a Russian former Greco-Roman wrestler of Georgian origin. He won an Olympic gold medal in Greco-Roman wrestling in 1988 in Seoul, South Korea, competing for the Soviet Union. After retirement, he has held posts in the Russian Wrestling Federation, currently being its president.

== Career ==
In 1978 along with his parents Mamiashvili moved to Moscow, Russian SFSR. He won gold medals at the 1983, 1985 and 1986 World Wrestling Championships and won the European championship in 1986. He also won two silver medal at the World Wrestling Championships in 1989, 1990. He was USSR National Champion in 1984, 1987, and 1988. He is currently the President of the Russian Wrestling Federation and one of the most powerful men in International Olympic wrestling, serving as a FILA Bureau Member (Federation of Associated Wrestling Style, www.fila-wrestling.com). Mamiashvili was inducted in the FILA Hall of Fame in 2008 for his many accomplishments as an athlete and administrator for Soviet/Russian wrestling.

He is the current chairperson and president of the Wrestling Federation of Russia^{[:ru]}.

== Controversy ==
At the 2004 Summer Olympics, Mamiashvili was accused by a Swedish board member of wrestling's international governing body for giving signs to a referee of a gold medal match involving a Russian wrestler. When the board member informed Mamiashvili of the accusation, Mamiashvili purportedly told him: "You should know that this may lead to your death," despite evidence found by the board member that the referee had been bribed.

In 2015, Mamiashvili was denied a United States visa to attend the UWW World Championships in Las Vegas.

At the 2016 Summer Olympics, Mamiashvili was accused of punching Russia's 63 kg female wrestler Inna Trazhukova in the face twice following her loss to Poland's Monika Michalik in the bronze medal match. Mamiashvili does not deny punching Trazhukova, claiming he wanted to punish her for a lack of effort.

In 2025, Mamiashvili was accused of abusing Chermen Valiev, a former Russian wrestler who transferred to Albania, as Mamiashvili was awarding Valiev a gold medal at the 2025 European Wrestling Championships in Bratislava, Slovakia. Footage at the awards ceremony appeared to show Mamiashvili aggressively placing the gold medal on Valiev and saying something that upset Valiev before Mamiashvili grabbed him in both arms, shoved a bouquet into Valiev’s hands and walked away. Valiev later said that Mamiashvili accused him of being a traitor.
