= Yanko Shopov =

Bulgarian wrestler

Yanko Krumov
Personal information
- Nationality: Bulgarian
- Born: 9 August 1954 (age 72) Kotel, Bulgaria

Sport
- Sport: Wrestling
Medal record
Representing Bulgaria
World Championships
Gold medal – first place	1979 San Diego	-74 kg
Silver medal – second place	1975 Minsk	-74 kg
Silver medal – second place	1977 Gothenburg	-74 kg
Summer Universiade
Gold medal – first place	1977 Sofia	-74 kg

Yanko Marinov Shopov (born 9 August 1954) is a Bulgarian wrestler. He competed at the 1976 Summer Olympics and the 1980 Summer Olympics.
