= Temo Kasarashvili =

Soviet wrestler

Personal information
- Native name: Темо (Тимур) Михайлович Казарашвили
- Nationality: Georgians
- Born: 1959 (age 66–67)
- Weight: 48 kg (106 lb)

Sport
- Country: Soviet Union
- Sport: Greco-Roman wrestling
- Club: «Трудовые резервы» (Rustavi); Armed forces (Tbilisi);
- Coached by: Ilya Chkhartishvili; O. Gugeshvili.
Medal record
Men's Greco-Roman wrestling
World Wrestling Championships
Gold medal – first place	1982 Katowice	48 kg
Bronze medal – third place	1983 Kiev	48 kg
European Championships
Bronze medal – third place	1985 Leipzig	48 kg
Summer Universiade
Gold medal – first place	1981 Bucharest	48 kg
- Updated on 15 September 2016

Temo Kasarashvili (Russian: Темо (Тимур) Михайлович Казарашвили, born 1959) is a retired Soviet Greco-Roman-style wrestler. Kasarashvili received medals in several USSR and international championships. He began his career in 1972 and retired in 1984.

== Sport results ==
- 1978 Junior Europe wrestling Championship - (silver) ;
- 1979 Junior World wrestling Championship - (gold) ;
- 1981 USSR Greco-Roman wrestling Championship - (bronze) ;
- 1982 USSR Greco-Roman wrestling Championship - (gold) ;
- 1983 USSR Greco-Roman wrestling Championship - (bronze) ;
- 1983 Greco-Roman wrestling at Spartakiad of Peoples of the USSR - (silver) ;
- 1984 USSR Greco-Roman wrestling Championship - (gold) ;

== Links ==
- "Казарашвили Темо Михайлович". 6анки.рф.
- Temo Kasarashvili at the International Wrestling Database
