= Arif Niftullayev =

Azerbaijani wrestler

Medal record

Representing the Soviet Union

Men's Greco-Roman wrestling

World Championships
| Gold medal – first place | 1978 Mexico City | 74 kg |

Arif Niftullayev (Azerbaijani: Arif Niftullayev) was a wrestler from Baku, Azerbaijan. He was a gold medalist in Greco-Roman wrestling at the 1978 World Wrestling Championship, competing for the Soviet Union.
