= Bob Walker (wrestler) =

American wrestler

Medal record

Men's Greco-Roman wrestling

Representing the United States

World Championships
Bronze medal – third place	1979 San Diego	+100 kg

Bob Walker is an American former Greco-Roman wrestler. He won a bronze medal at the 1979 World Wrestling Championships in the +100 kg weight class.

== High school ==
Walker attended Fountain Valley High School in Fountain Valley, California, where he was a three-time league champion, a CIF Region champion, and third place at the CIF Southern Section Championships.

== College ==
He wrestled collegiately at the University of Alabama, where he was a three-time Southeastern Conference champion.

== Senior level ==
Following college, as a Greco-Roman wrestler, Walker placed second at the 1976 U.S. Olympic Trials and was a bronze medalist for the United States at the 1979 World Wrestling Championships.

== Coaching career ==
Following his competitive career, he became a wrestling coach in Florida. His coaching career started in 1979, at Seminole High School in Sanford, Florida. Walker would also start the World Class Wrestling Club, where he served as head coach for 10 years. In 1994, Walker was named USA Wrestling Southeast State Chairperson of the Year, and two years later was named the National State Chairperson of the Year.

For his dedication and contributions to the sport of wrestling, Walker was named to the Florida Chapter of the National Wrestling Hall of Fame in 2003. He was inducted into the California Wrestling Hall of Fame in 2015.
