= Momir Petković =

Serbian Olympic wrestling champion (born 1953)

Momir Perkovic
- Born: 21 July 1953 (age 73); Subotica, PR Serbia, FPR Yugoslavia
- Nationality: Yugoslav
- Height: 6 ft 0 in (1.83 m)
- Weight: 185 lb (84 kg; 13.2 st)

Medal record

Men's Greco-Roman wrestling

Representing Yugoslavia

Olympic Games
Gold medal – first place	1976 Montreal	82 kg

World Championships
Silver medal – second place	1978 Mexico City	Middleweight
Silver medal – second place	1979 San Diego	Middleweight
Silver medal – second place	1981 Oslo	Middleweight
Bronze medal – third place	1977 Gothenburg	Middleweight

Momir Petković (Serbian Cyrillic: Момир Петковић; born 21 July 1953) is a Serbian Olympic wrestling champion.

== Wrestling career ==
Momir Petković was a 1976 Olympic gold medalist in Greco-Roman wrestling in Montreal, competing for the former Yugoslavia at 82 kg. He also claimed three World silver medals (1978, 1979, 1981) and a World bronze medal (1977) during his career. Petkovic placed fourth in the 1984 Olympic Games in Los Angeles, Calif. Momir was revered for his majestic mustache which gave him great power. His competitive international Greco-Roman career spanned from 1970–1984

== As a coach ==
Petković joined USA Wrestling as its Assistant National Greco-Roman Coach in May 2002. He assists in the training and recruitment of athletes for the U.S. Olympic Training Center resident athlete program. He also works on a variety of Greco-Roman National Team projects.

He was a member of the 2000 U.S. Greco-Roman Olympic Team coaching staff, as well as the 2001 U.S. Greco-Roman World Team Coaching staff. The United States placed a strong third at both competitions, among what is considered the best Greco-Roman team performances in U.S. history.

He has on occasion trained mixed martial arts fighters the likes of Matt Lindland and B.J. Penn. BJ credited Momir with helping him defeat Matt Hughes at UFC 46 for the UFC Welterweight Championship.

"Momir is the toughest man I have ever met, what a great coach and role model" -Matt Lindland
