= Gheorghe Ciobotaru =

Romanian wrestler (born 1953)

Personal information
- Nationality: Romanian
- Born: 14 December 1953 (age 72) Galați, Romania

Sport
- Sport: Wrestling
Medal record
Representing Romania
World Championships
Bronze medal – third place	1978 Mexico City	-74kg
Summer Universiade
Silver medal – second place	1977 Sofia	-74kg
Silver medal – second place	1981 Bucharest	-74kg

Gheorghe Ciobotaru (born 14 December 1953) is a Romanian wrestler. He competed in the men's Greco-Roman 74 kg at the 1976 Summer Olympics.
