= 1979 Summer Spartakiad of the Peoples of the USSR =

The 7th Summer Spartakiad of the Peoples of the USSR (Russian: VII летняя Спартакиада народов СССР) was held in the Soviet Union in 1979, with the final stage in July and August 1979. Most events of the final stage were held in Moscow, with Leningrad, Kiev, Minsk, Vilnius, Kaunas, Tallinn and Riga also hosting some events.

== Early stages ==
The Spartakiad of the Peoples of the USSR was a mass participation event, with millions of people taking part in competitions associated with it; the early stages consisted of minor qualification meets on the club, local and regional levels, with the best athletes representing their republics in the final stage. The cities of Moscow and Leningrad also fielded teams, with equal status to the republics.

== Final stage ==
The final stage of the 1979 Spartakiad served as a preparatory meet for the Summer Olympics of the following year, with many of the same venues being used. For the first time in the history of the Spartakiad of the Peoples of the USSR, non-Soviet athletes were invited to take part; the final stage featured 2,306 international athletes from 84 nations, as well as 8,338 Soviet athletes. More countries participated in the Spartakiad than in the following year's Olympics, due to the US-led boycott of the latter in protest of the Soviet invasion of Afghanistan; the United States did not boycott the Spartakiad (as the USSR had not yet invaded Afghanistan at the time), although there were some objections in the country to the Soviet non-invitation of athletes from Israel and Egypt. Many of the non-Soviet teams were comparatively weak, and the vast majority of gold medals were won by Soviet athletes. Some world-class international athletes did take part, however; Miruts Yifter of Ethiopia won gold in both the 5,000 metres and the 10,000 metres, a feat he duplicated at the Olympics the following year.

Although most events were open to international participation, a number of sports were still limited to Soviet athletes only.

== Sports ==
- Archery
- Athletics
- Basketball
- Boxing
- Canoeing
- Chess
- Cycling
- Diving
- Equestrian
- Fencing
- Field hockey
- Football
- Gymnastics
- Handball
- Judo
- Modern pentathlon
- Rowing
- Sailing
- Shooting
- Swimming
- Tennis
- Volleyball
- Water polo
- Weightlifting
- Wrestling
