= Lars Malmkvist =

Swedish wrestler

Personal information
- Nationality: Swedish
- Born: 24 September 1955 (age 69); Malmö, Sweden

Sport
- Sport: Wrestling

Lars Malmkvist (born 24 September 1955) is a Swedish wrestler. He competed at the 1976 Summer Olympics and the 1980 Summer Olympics.
