= Turkish Wrestling Federation =

Sports governing body in Turkey

- Abbreviation: TGF
- Formation: 1923
- Type: Sports federation
- Headquarters: Ulus, Ankara, Turkey
- Coordinates: 39°56′30.85″N 32°51′15.60″E
- President: Taha Akgül
- Affiliations: United World Wrestling (UWW)
- Website: tgf.tr

Turkish Wrestling Federation (Turkish: Türkiye Güreş Federasyonu, TGF) is the governing body for wrestling in Turkey. It aims to govern, encourage and develop the sport for all throughout the country.

TGF has been established in 1923, and is headquartered in Ankara. TGF is a member of United World Wrestling (UWW), formerly known as the International Federation of Associated Wrestling Styles (FILA).

The federation organizes the national wrestling events, and European and World championships hosted by Turkey. In addition, the TGF promotes and organizes traditional wrestling styles such as oil wrestling and Karakucak.

== International participation ==
=== Olympics ===
Year	Host country	Rank	Gold	Silver	Bronze	Total
1924	France	-	0	0	0	0
1928	Netherlands	-	0	0	0	0
1936	Germany	7	1	0	1	2
1948	United Kingdom	1	6	4	1	11
1952	Finland	4	2	0	1	3
1956	Australia	2	3	2	2	7
1960	Italy	1	7	2	0	9
1964	Japan	3	2	3	1	6
1968	Mexico	5	2	0	0	2
1972	West Germany	12	0	1	0	1
1976	Canada	-	0	0	0	0
1984	United States	14	0	0	1	1
1988	South Korea	12	0	1	0	1
1992	Spain	7	1	2	1	4
1996	United States	4	2	0	1	3
2000	Australia	6	1	0	1	2
2004	Greece	14	0	1	2	3
2008	China	7	1	0	1	2
2012	United Kingdom	22	0	0	1	1
2016	Brazil	5	1	2	2	5
2020	Japan	17	0	0	3	3
2024	France	18	0	0	2	2

=== World Championships ===
Year	Host country	Rank	Gold	Silver	Bronze	Total
1950	Sweden	2	1	4	2	7
1951	Finland	1	6	0	1	7
1953	Italy	6	0	1	0	1
1954	Japan	2	2	3	1	6
1955	West Germany	4	0	2	2	4
1957	Turkey	1	4	2	2	8
1958	Hungary	2	2	2	1	5
1959	Iran	2	2	2	2	6
1961	Japan	7	0	4	6	10
1962	United States	2	3	1	5	9
1963	Bulgaria; Sweden	4	2	0	3	5
1965	United Kingdom; Finland	4	1	1	1	3
1966	United States	3	1	4	3	8
1967	India; Romania	6	1	0	1	2
1970	Canada	8	1	0	1	2
1971	Bulgaria	13	0	1	0	1
1973	Iran	-	0	0	0	0
1974	Turkey; Poland	8	0	2	2	4
1975	Soviet Union	9	0	1	0	1
1977	Switzerland; Sweden	15	0	1	0	1
1978	Mexico	15	0	0	1	1
1981	Yugoslavia; Norway	11	0	1	0	1
1982	Canada; Poland	11	0	1	0	1
1983	Soviet Union	12	0	1	0	1
1985	Hungary; Norway	-	0	0	0	0
1986	Hungary	-	0	0	0	0
1987	France; Norway	23	0	0	1	1
1989	Switzerland	14	0	1	0	1
1990	Japan; Sweden	20	0	0	1	1
1991	Bulgaria; Japan	16	0	1	1	2
1993	Canada; Sweden; Norway	7	2	1	0	3
1994	Turkey; Finland; Bulgaria	5	2	1	0	3
1995	United States; Czech Republic; Russia	6	2	0	1	3
1997	Russia; Poland; France	2	3	2	0	5
1998	Iran; Sweden; Poland	13	0	2	1	3
1999	Turkey; Greece; Sweden	6	2	1	2	5
2000	Bulgaria	-	0	0	0	0
2001	Bulgaria; Greece	21	0	0	1	1
2002	Iran; Russia; Greece	9	1	0	1	2
2003	United States; France	-	0	0	0	0
2005	Hungary	5	2	0	2	4
2006	China	13	0	1	3	4
2007	Azerbaijan	10	1	0	0	1
2008	Japan	-	0	0	0	0
2009	Denmark	4	2	1	2	5
2010	Russia	9	1	0	2	3
2011	Turkey	7	1	2	2	5
2012	Canada	-	0	0	0	0
2013	Hungary	16	0	1	3	4
2014	Uzbekistan	5	1	3	4	8
2015	United States	3	3	1	2	6
2016	Hungary	7	0	1	0	1
2017	France	3	3	1	4	8
2018	Hungary	4	1	4	4	9
2019	Kazakhstan	6	1	2	1	4
2021	Norway	13	0	1	3	4
2022	Serbia	3	4	0	4	8
2023	Serbia	6	2	1	4	7
2024	Albania	7	0	1	1	2

=== European Championships ===
Year	Host country	Medal Rank	Gold	Silver	Bronze	Total
1938	Estonia	6	0	0	1	1
1939	Norway	5	0	2	0	2
1946	Sweden	1	3	2	1	6
1947	Czechoslovakia	3	1	2	1	4
1949	Turkey	1	6	1	1	8
1966	West Germany	2	3	3	4	10
1967	Turkey; Soviet Union	2	5	1	0	6
1968	Yugoslavia; Sweden	5	1	0	2	3
1969	Italy; Bulgaria	4	2	2	4	8
1970	East Germany	6	1	2	1	4
1972	Poland	6	1	1	0	2
1973	Switzerland; Finland	7	0	3	2	5
1974	Spain	7	0	1	0	1
1975	West Germany	10	0	2	2	4
1976	Soviet Union	11	0	0	1	2
1977	Turkey	9	0	3	3	6
1978	Bulgaria	8	0	1	1	2
1979	Romania	10	0	0	1	1
1980	Czechoslovakia	-	0	0	0	0
1981	Sweden; Poland	10	0	0	1	1
1982	Bulgaria	9	0	1	2	3
1983	Hungary	4	1	1	0	2
1984	Sweden	10	0	1	0	1
1985	East Germany	6	0	1	2	3
1986	Greece	-	0	0	0	0
1987	Bulgaria; Finland	12	0	0	3	3
1988	United Kingdom; Norway	7	0	2	0	2
1989	Turkey; Finland	4	1	5	3	9
1990	Poland	6	1	0	3	4
1991	Germany	3	2	1	4	7
1992	Denmark; Hungary	5	1	2	6	9
1993	Russia; Turkey	2	3	3	3	9
1994	Greece; Italy	3	3	2	1	6
1995	France; Switzerland	4	1	4	0	5
1996	Norway; Hungary	2	4	1	0	5
1997	Finland; Poland	3	2	2	3	7
1998	Belarus; Slovakia	2	4	0	2	6
1999	Bulgaria; Belarus	5	2	1	1	4
2000	Russia; Hungary	13	0	2	2	4
2001	Turkey; Hungary	2	3	2	1	6
2002	Azerbaijan; Finland	2	3	0	2	5
2003	Latvia; Serbia and Montenegro	5	1	2	2	5
2004	Turkey; Sweden	2	5	0	1	6
2005	Bulgaria	4	1	3	3	7
2006	Russia	3	2	2	3	7
2007	Bulgaria	15	0	0	6	6
2008	Finland	4	2	1	3	6
2009	Lithuania	9	0	2	4	6
2010	Azerbaijan	3	2	1	3	6
2011	Germany	7	1	1	1	3
2012	Serbia	3	2	0	4	6
2013	Georgia	4	2	1	4	7
2014	Finland	3	2	4	3	9
2015	Azerbaijan	3	2	1	7	10
2016	Latvia	3	3	1	3	7
2017	Serbia	2	5	1	3	9
2018	Russia	2	5	0	8	13
2019	Romania	2	6	2	8	16
2020	Italy	8	1	3	5	9
2021	Poland	2	3	4	1	8
2022	Hungary	1	7	3	7	17
2023	Croatia	1	6	3	8	17
2024	Romania	1	7	6	4	17

=== European Games ===
Year	Host country	Rank	Gold	Silver	Bronze	Total
2015	Azerbaijan	3	2	1	7	10
2019	Belarus	9	0	1	2	3

=== Mediterranean Games ===
Year	Host country	Rank	Gold	Silver	Bronze	Total
1951	Egypt	1	8	0	0	8
1955	Spain	1	6	0	1	7
1959	Lebanon	1	12	2	1	15
1963	Italy	1	10	2	1	13
1967	Tunisia	1	9	3	2	14
1971	Turkey	1	14	3	0	17
1975	Algeria	1	11	4	2	17
1979	Yugoslavia	2	5	4	5	14
1983	Morocco	1	9	0	7	16
1987	Syria	1	6	2	5	13
1991	Greece	1	11	1	0	12
1993	France	1	10	5	3	18
1997	Italy	1	8	3	2	13
2001	Tunisia	1	9	1	9	19
2005	Spain	1	5	5	5	15
2009	Italy	1	7	2	4	13
2013	Turkey	1	14	4	1	19
2018	Spain	1	8	2	3	13
2022	Algeria	1	7	5	2	14

=== Islamic Solidarity Games ===
Year	Host country	Rank	Gold	Silver	Bronze	Total
2017	Azerbaijan	4	2	8	9	19
2022	Turkey	5	2	5	12	19
2025	Saudi Arabia	6	0	2	7	9

=== Military World Games ===
Year	Host country	Rank	Gold	Silver	Bronze	Total
1995	Italy	2	5	1	1	7
1999	Croatia	9	0	1	0	1
2007	India	2	2	1	2	5
2015	South Korea	-	0	0	0	0
2019	China	5	2	0	3	5

=== Summer Universiade ===
Year	Host country	Rank	Gold	Silver	Bronze	Total
1973	Soviet Union	-	0	0	0	0
1977	Bulgaria	8	0	0	1	1
1981	Romania	-	0	0	0	0
2005	Turkey	2	3	5	2	10
2013	Russia	4	2	0	1	3

== Notable wrestlers ==
=== Freestyle ===
Men's

- Mustafa Dağıstanlı (1931-2022), twice Olympic, triple world champion
- Taha Akgül (born 1990), Olympic, triple world, eleven-times European champion
- Ahmet Ayık (born 1938), Olympic, twice world, twice European champion
- Yaşar Doğu (1913–1961), Olympic, world and triple European champion
- Mahmut Demir (born 1970), Olympic, world and triple European champion
- Celal Atik (1918–1979), Olympic, world and twice European champion
- Nasuh Akar (1925–1984), Olympic, world and European champion
- Ramazan Şahin (born 1983), Olympic, world, European champion
- Mahmut Atalay (1934–2004), Olympic, world champion
- Gazanfer Bilge (1924–2008), Olympic, European champion
- Ahmet Bilek (1932–1970), Olympic champion
- Hasan Gemici (1927–2001), Olympic champion
- Hasan Güngör (1934–2011), Olympic champion
- İsmet Atlı (1931–2014), Olympic champion
- Bayram Şit (1930-2019), Olympic champion
- İsmail Ogan (1933–2020), Olympic champion
- Hüseyin Akbaş (1933–1989), twice Olympic medalist, four-times world champion
- Aydın Polatçı (born 1977), Olympic medalist, world, twice European champion
- Soner Demirtaş (born 1991), Olympic medalist, triple European champion
- Ahmet Kireççi (1914–1979), Olympic medalist
- Adil Candemir (1917–1989), Olympic medalist
- Adil Atan (1929–1989), Olympic medalist
- Halit Balamir (1922–2009), Olympic medalist
- İbrahim Zengin (1931-2013), Olympic medalist
- Vehbi Akdağ (1949–2020), Olympic medalist
- Ayhan Taşkın (born 1953), Olympic medalist
- Necmi Gençalp (born 1960), Olympic medalist
- Kenan Şimşek (born 1968), Olympic medalist
- Adem Bereket (born 1973), Olympic medalist
- Selim Yaşar (born 1990), Olympic medalist
- Sebahattin Öztürk (born 1969), world, European champion
- Harun Doğan (born 1976), world, European champion
- Zekeriya Güçlü (1972-2010), world champion
- Feyzullah Aktürk (born 1999), triple European champion
- Mehmet Esenceli (born 1940), twice European champion
- Süleyman Atlı (born 1994), twice European champion
- Fevzi Şeker (1962-2011), European champion
- Reşit Karabacak (1954-2020), European champion
- Ahmet Ak (born 1966), European champion
- Yüksel Şanlı (born 1973), European champion
- Fatih Çakıroğlu (born 1981), European champion
- Tevfik Odabaşı (born 1981), European champion
- Rıza Yıldırım (born 1987), European champion
- Mustafa Kaya (born 1992), European champion
- Süleyman Karadeniz (born 1995), European champion

Women's

- Yasemin Adar Yiğit (born 1991), Olympic medalist, twice world, seven-times European champion
- Buse Tosun Çavuşoğlu (born 1995), Olympic medalist, world, European champion
- Elif Jale Yeşilırmak (born 1986), European champion
- Evin Demirhan Yavuz (born 1995), European champion
- Nesrin Baş (born 2002), European champion

=== Greco-Roman style ===
- Hamza Yerlikaya (born 1976), twice Olympic, triple world, eight-times European champion
- Mithat Bayrak (1929-2014), twice Olympic champion
- Tevfik Kış (1934-2019), Olympic, twice world, European champion
- Kazım Ayvaz (1938-2020), Olympic, twice world champion
- Ahmet Kireççi (1914–1979), Olympic champion
- Yaşar Erkan (1911–1986), Olympic champion
- Mehmet Oktav (1917–1996), Olympic champion
- Müzahir Sille (1931–2016), Olympic champion
- Mehmet Akif Pirim (born 1968), Olympic champion
- Rıza Kayaalp (born 1989), triple Olympic medalist, five-times world, twelve-times European champion
- Nazmi Avluca (born 1976), Olympic medalist, twice world, four-times European champion
- Şeref Eroğlu (born 1975), Olympic medalist, world, six-times European champion
- Hakkı Başar (born 1969), Olympic medalist, world, European champion
- Mehmet Özal (born 1978), Olympic medalist, world champion
- Dursun Ali Eğribaş (1933-2014), Olympic medalist
- Kenan Olcay (born 1914), Olympic medalist
- Halil Kaya (born 1920), Olympic medalist
- Rıza Doğan (1931–2004), Olympic medalist, world champion
- Muhlis Tayfur (1922–2008), Olympic medalist
- Ali Kayalı (born 1965), Olympic medalist
- Cenk İldem (born 1986), Olympic medalist
- Selçuk Çebi (born 1982), triple world champion
- Metehan Başar (born 1991), twice world champion
- Burhan Akbudak (born 1995), world, European champion
- Muharrem Candaş (1921-2009), world champion
- Ercan Yıldız (born 1974), world champion
- Ali Cengiz (born 1996), world champion
- Sırrı Acar (born 1943), twice European champion
- İsmail Güzel (born 1989), European champion
- Murat Fırat (born 1997), European champion
- Kerem Kamal (born 1999), European champion
- Adem Uzun (born 2001), European champion
- Selçuk Can (born 1995), European champion
- Alperen Berber (born 2005), European champion

== International organizations in Turkey ==
- 1949 European Wrestling Championships, 25 June - 3 July, Istanbul
- 1956 Wrestling World Cup, 25–31 May, Istanbul
- 1957 World Wrestling Championships, June 1–2, Istanbul
- 1967 European Wrestling Championships, 07 – 10 July, Istanbul
- 1974 World Wrestling Championships (Freestyle), August 29-September, Istanbul
- 1977 European Wrestling Championships, 26 – 29 May, Bursa
- 1989 European Wrestling Championships,(Freestyle) 12 – 14 May, Ankara
- 1993 European Wrestling Championships, 20–28 August, Istanbul
- 1994 World Wrestling Championships (Freestyle), August 25–28, Istanbul
- 1999 World Wrestling Championships (Freestyle), October 7–10, Ankara
- 2001 European Wrestling Championships (Greco-Romane), 19–22 April, Istanbul
- 2004 European Wrestling Championships (Freestyle), 23 – 25 April, Ankara
- 2008 World Junior Wrestling Championships, July 29 – August 4, Istanbul
- 2009 World Junior Wrestling Championships, August 4–9, Ankara
- 2011 World Wrestling Championships, September 12–18, Istanbul
- Wrestling at the 2013 Mediterranean Games, 22–26 June, Mersin
- 2015 European Juniors Wrestling Championships, 23–28 June, Istanbul
- 2016 World Wrestling Olympic Qualification Tournament 2, 6–8 May, Istanbul
- 2018 European U23 Wrestling Championship, 4–10 June, Istanbul
- Wrestling at the 2021 Islamic Solidarity Games, 10–13 August, Konya
- 2023 U17 World Wrestling Championships, 31 July–6 August, Istanbul
- 2024 World Wrestling Olympic Qualification Tournament, 9–12 May, Istanbul

== Events ==
- 27th U17 Victory Cup and U20 Champions Cup Tournament May 2025 - Since 1997 (or 1999) 2020 and 2021 Not Held ?
- Yasar Dogu Tournament - Since 1973
- Vehbi Emre & Hamit Kaplan Tournament - Since 1983
