= 1974 European Wrestling Championships =

Wrestling Championship

- Host city: Spain, Madrid
- Dates: 21 – 29 June 1974

Champions
- Freestyle: Soviet Union
- Greco-Roman: Soviet Union

The 1974 European Wrestling Championships was held from 21 to 29 June 1974 in Madrid, Spain.

== Medal table ==
Rank	Nation	Gold	Silver	Bronze	Total
1	Soviet Union	11	6	1	18
2	Bulgaria	7	2	1	10
3	East Germany	1	3	4	8
4	Romania	1	2	6	9
5	Poland	0	2	3	5
6	West Germany	0	2	2	4
7	Czechoslovakia	0	1	0	1
7	Finland	0	1	0	1
7	Turkey	0	1	0	1
10	France	0	0	2	2
11	Italy	0	0	1	1
Totals (11 entries)		20	20	20	60

== Medal summary ==
=== Men's freestyle ===
Event	Gold	Silver	Bronze
48 kg	Vitali Tokchinakov; Soviet Union	Mehmet Canbaz; Turkey	Tadeusz Kudelski; Poland
52 kg	Ognyan Nikolov; Bulgaria	Telman Pashayev; Soviet Union	Władysław Stecyk; Poland
57 kg	Pano Shelev; Bulgaria	Hans-Dieter Brüchert; East Germany	Emil Müller; West Germany
62 kg	Doncho Zhekov; Bulgaria	Petre Coman; Romania	Théodule Toulotte; France
68 kg	Ivan Vasilev; Bulgaria	Mahmet Ibraguimov; Soviet Union	Gerald Brauer; East Germany
74 kg	Ruslan Ashuraliyev; Soviet Union	Adolf Seger; West Germany	Yancho Pavlov; Bulgaria
82 kg	Viktor Novozhilov; Soviet Union	Benno Paulitz; East Germany	Vasile Iorga; Romania
90 kg	Levan Tediashvili; Soviet Union	Paweł Kurczewski; Poland	Horst Stottmeister; East Germany
100 kg	Harald Büttner; East Germany	Ivan Yarygin; Soviet Union	Edward Żmudziejewski; Poland
+100 kg	Soslan Andiyev; Soviet Union	Ladislau Șimon; Romania	Heinz Eichelbaum; West Germany

=== Men's Greco-Roman ===
Event	Gold	Silver	Bronze
48 kg	Constantin Alexandru; Romania	Aleksey Shumakov; Soviet Union	Antonio Quistelli; Italy
52 kg	Petar Kirov; Bulgaria	Valery Arutiunov; Soviet Union	Nicu Gingă; Romania
57 kg	Farhat Mustafin; Soviet Union	Risto Björlin; Finland	Ion Dulică; Romania
62 kg	Anatoly Kavkayev; Soviet Union	Georgi Markov; Bulgaria	Ion Păun; Romania
68 kg	Shamil Khisamutdinov; Soviet Union	Andrzej Supron; Poland	Heinz-Helmut Wehling; East Germany
74 kg	Ivan Kolev; Bulgaria	Vítězslav Mácha; Czechoslovakia	Iosif Berishvili; Soviet Union
82 kg	Anatoly Nazarenko; Soviet Union	Werner Schröter; West Germany	André Bouchoule; France
90 kg	Valery Rezantsev; Soviet Union	Dieter Heuer; East Germany	Vasile Fodorpataki; Romania
100 kg	Kamen Goranov; Bulgaria	Nikolay Balboshin; Soviet Union	Fredi Albrecht; East Germany
+100 kg	Shota Morchiladze; Soviet Union	Aleksandar Tomov; Bulgaria	Roman Codreanu; Romania
