= 1973 European Wrestling Championships =

- Host city: Switzerland, Losanna (Freestyle); Finland Helsinki (Greco-Roman)
- Dates: 30 March – 4 April 1973; 1 – 4 June 1973

Champions
- Freestyle: Soviet Union
- Greco-Roman: Bulgaria

The 1973 European Wrestling Championships were held in the men's Freestyle style in Losanna Switzerland 30 March – 4 April 1973; the Greco-Romane style in Helsinki Finland 1 – 4 June 1973.

== Medal table ==
Rank	Nation	Gold	Silver	Bronze	Total
1	Soviet Union	10	4	4	18
2	Bulgaria	6	7	2	15
3	Poland	1	2	1	4
4	Romania	1	0	1	2
5	Sweden	1	0	0	1
5	West Germany	1	0	0	1
7	Turkey	0	3	2	5
8	Hungary	0	2	1	3
9	East Germany	0	1	4	5
10	Czechoslovakia	0	1	0	1
11	Finland	0	0	2	2
11	Yugoslavia	0	0	2	2
13	Norway	0	0	1	1
Totals (13 entries)		20	20	20	60

== Medal summary ==
=== Men's freestyle ===
Event	Gold	Silver	Bronze
48 kg	Hasan Isaev; Bulgaria	Rafig Hajiyev; Soviet Union	Tadeusz Kudelski; Poland
52 kg	Arsen Alakhverdiyev; Soviet Union	Ali Rıza Alan; Turkey	Henrik Gál; Hungary
57 kg	Kirkor Leonov; Bulgaria	László Klinga; Hungary	Rain Dobordzhekidze; Soviet Union
62 kg	Ivan Yankov; Bulgaria	Zagalav Abdulbekov; Soviet Union	Vehbi Akdağ; Turkey
68 kg	Nasrula Nasrulayev; Soviet Union	Stefan Stoikov; Bulgaria	Ali Şahin; Turkey
74 kg	Adolf Seger; West Germany	Viktor Zilberman; Soviet Union	Frank Birke; East Germany
82 kg	Vasili Siulzhin; Soviet Union	Hayri Polat; Turkey	Benno Paulitz; East Germany
90 kg	Piotr Surikov; Soviet Union	Horst Stottmeister; East Germany	Dimo Kostov; Bulgaria
100 kg	Vladimir Gulyutkin; Soviet Union	József Csatári; Hungary	Harald Büttner; East Germany
+100 kg	Nodar Modebadze; Soviet Union	Alaettin Yıldırım; Turkey	Boyan Boev; Bulgaria

=== Men's Greco-Roman ===
Event	Gold	Silver	Bronze
48 kg	Gheorghe Berceanu; Romania	Pavel Hristov; Bulgaria	Vladimir Netsvetayev; Soviet Union
52 kg	Jan Michalik; Poland	Todor Todorov; Bulgaria	Valery Arutyunov; Soviet Union
57 kg	Hristo Traikov; Bulgaria	Yuri Sokolov; Soviet Union	Ivan Frgić; Yugoslavia
62 kg	Nelson Davidyan; Soviet Union	Kazimierz Lipień; Poland	Harald Hervig; Norway
68 kg	Shamil Khisamutdinov; Soviet Union	Nedko Nedev; Bulgaria	Sreten Damjanović; Yugoslavia
74 kg	Ivan Kolev; Bulgaria	Vítězslav Mácha; Czechoslovakia	Klaus-Peter Göpfert; East Germany
82 kg	Gennady Korban; Soviet Union	Jan Dołgowicz; Poland	Pavel Pavlov; Bulgaria
90 kg	Frank Andersson; Sweden	Dimitar Ivanov; Bulgaria	Keijo Manni; Finland
100 kg	Nikolay Balboshin; Soviet Union	Kamen Goranov; Bulgaria	Nicolae Martinescu; Romania
+100 kg	Aleksandar Tomov; Bulgaria	Marek Galiński; Poland	Shota Morchiladze; Soviet Union
