= Wrestling at the 1972 Summer Olympics – Men's freestyle 82 kg =

Men's freestyle 82 kg at the Games of the XX Olympiad
- Venue: Messe München
- Dates: 27–31 August 1972
- Competitors: 24 from 24 nations

Medalists
| 1st place, gold medalist(s) | | Levan Tediashvili | Soviet Union |
| 2nd place, silver medalist(s) | | John Peterson | United States |
| 3rd place, bronze medalist(s) | | Vasile Iorga | Romania |

The Men's Freestyle 82 kg at the 1972 Summer Olympics as part of the wrestling program at the Fairgrounds, Judo and Wrestling Hall.

== Medalists ==
| Gold | Levan Tediashvili; Soviet Union |
| Silver | John Peterson; United States |
| Bronze | Vasile Iorga; Romania |

== Tournament results ==
The competition used a form of negative points tournament, with negative points given for any result short of a fall. Accumulation of 6 negative points eliminated the wrestler. When only two or three wrestlers remain, a special final round is used to determine the order of the medals.

Legend

- DNA — Did not appear
- TPP — Total penalty points
- MPP — Match penalty points

Penalties

- 0 — Won by Fall, Passivity, Injury and Forfeit
- 0.5 — Won by Technical Superiority
- 1 — Won by Points
- 2 — Draw
- 2.5 — Draw, Passivity
- 3 — Lost by Points
- 3.5 — Lost by Technical Superiority
- 4 — Lost by Fall, Passivity, Injury and Forfeit

=== Round 1 ===
| TPP | MPP | | Time | | MPP | TPP |
|---|---|---|---|---|---|---|
| 4 | 4 | Harish Chander (IND) | 7:08 | David Aspin (NZL) | 4 | 4 |
| 2 | 2 | Tatsuo Sasaki (JPN) | | Ali Hagilou (IRI) | 2 | 2 |
| 1 | 1 | Jimmy Martinetti (SUI) | | Jesús Blanco (ARG) | 3 | 3 |
| 3 | 3 | André Bouchoule (FRA) | | Vasile Iorga (ROU) | 1 | 1 |
| 4 | 4 | Constant Bens (BEL) | 0:52 | Peter Neumair (FRG) | 0 | 0 |
| 4 | 4 | Richard Barraclough (GBR) | 1:49 | John Peterson (USA) | 0 | 0 |
| 0 | 0 | Jan Wypiorczyk (POL) | 8:41 | Lupe Lara (CUB) | 4 | 4 |
| 4 | 4 | Ghulam Dastagir (AFG) | 3:41 | Kurt Elmgren (SWE) | 0 | 0 |
| 3.5 | 3.5 | Ibrahim Diop (SEN) | | Levan Tediashvili (URS) | 0.5 | 0.5 |
| 3 | 3 | Hayri Polat (TUR) | | Tömöriin Artag (MGL) | 1 | 1 |
| 1 | 1 | Horst Stottmeister (GDR) | | István Kovács (HUN) | 3 | 3 |
| 1 | 1 | Ivan Iliev (BUL) | | Taras Hryb (CAN) | 3 | 3 |

=== Round 2 ===
| TPP | MPP | | Time | | MPP | TPP |
|---|---|---|---|---|---|---|
| 8 | 4 | Harish Chander (IND) | 8:55 | Tatsuo Sasaki (JPN) | 0 | 2 |
| 7 | 3 | David Aspin (NZL) | | Ali Hajiloo (IRI) | 1 | 3 |
| 2 | 1 | Jimmy Martinetti (SUI) | | André Bouchoule (FRA) | 3 | 6 |
| 7 | 4 | Jesús Blanco (ARG) | 5:10 | Vasile Iorga (ROU) | 0 | 1 |
| 7.5 | 3.5 | Constant Bens (BEL) | | Richard Barraclough (GBR) | 0.5 | 4.5 |
| 3 | 3 | Peter Neumair (FRG) | | John Peterson (USA) | 1 | 1 |
| 0 | 0 | Jan Wypiorczyk (POL) | 5:58 | Ghulam Dastagir (AFG) | 4 | 8 |
| 7 | 3 | Lupe Lara (CUB) | | Kurt Elmgren (SWE) | 1 | 1 |
| 7.5 | 4 | Ibrahim Diop (SEN) | 5:58 | Hayri Polat (TUR) | 0 | 3 |
| 1.5 | 1 | Levan Tediashvili (URS) | | Tömöriin Artag (MGL) | 3 | 4 |
| 1 | 0 | Horst Stottmeister (GDR) | 5:42 | Ivan Iliev (BUL) | 4 | 5 |
| 4 | 1 | István Kovács (HUN) | | Taras Hryb (CAN) | 3 | 6 |

=== Round 3 ===
| TPP | MPP | | Time | | MPP | TPP |
|---|---|---|---|---|---|---|
| 3 | 1 | Tatsuo Sasaki (JPN) | | Jimmy Martinetti (SUI) | 3 | 5 |
| 7 | 4 | Ali Hajiloo (IRI) | 7:10 | Vasile Iorga (ROU) | 0 | 1 |
| 3 | 0 | Peter Neumair (FRG) | 2:22 | Richard Barraclough (GBR) | 4 | 8.5 |
| 1 | 0 | John Peterson (USA) | 6:35 | Jan Wypiorczyk (POL) | 4 | 4 |
| 5 | 4 | Kurt Elmgren (SWE) | 8:44 | Levan Tediashvili (URS) | 0 | 1.5 |
| 6 | 3 | Hayri Polat (TUR) | | Horst Stottmeister (GDR) | 1 | 2 |
| 5 | 1 | Tömöriin Artag (MGL) | | István Kovács (HUN) | 3 | 7 |
| 5 | | Ivan Iliev (BUL) | | Bye | | |

=== Round 4 ===
| TPP | MPP | | Time | | MPP | TPP |
|---|---|---|---|---|---|---|
| 8 | 3 | Ivan Iliev (BUL) | | Tatsuo Sasaki (JPN) | 1 | 4 |
| 9 | 4 | Jimmy Martinetti (SUI) | 7:31 | Vasile Iorga (ROU) | 0 | 1 |
| 4 | 1 | Peter Neumair (FRG) | | Jan Wypiorczyk (POL) | 3 | 7 |
| 4 | 3 | John Peterson (USA) | | Levan Tediashvili (URS) | 1 | 2.5 |
| 6 | 1 | Kurt Elmgren (SWE) | | Tömöriin Artag (MGL) | 3 | 8 |
| 2 | | Horst Stottmeister (GDR) | | Bye | | |

=== Round 5 ===
| TPP | MPP | | Time | | MPP | TPP |
|---|---|---|---|---|---|---|
| 4 | 2 | Horst Stottmeister (GDR) | | Tatsuo Sasaki (JPN) | 2 | 6 |
| 4 | 3 | Vasile Iorga (ROU) | | John Peterson (USA) | 1 | 5 |
| 7 | 3 | Peter Neumair (FRG) | | Levan Tediashvili (URS) | 1 | 3.5 |

=== Round 6 ===
| TPP | MPP | | Time | | MPP | TPP |
|---|---|---|---|---|---|---|
| 7 | 3 | Horst Stottmeister (GDR) | | John Peterson (USA) | 1 | 6 |
| 7 | 3 | Vasile Iorga (ROU) | | Levan Tediashvili (URS) | 1 | 4.5 |

== Final standings ==
1. Levan Tediashvili (URS)
2. John Peterson (USA)
3. Vasile Iorga (ROU)
4. Horst Stottmeister (GDR)
5. Tatsuo Sasaki (JPN)
6. Peter Neumair (FRG)
