= 1975 European Wrestling Championships =

- Host city: West Germany, Ludwigshafen
- Dates: 27 April - 4 May 1975

Champions
- Freestyle: Soviet Union
- Greco-Roman: Soviet Union

The 1975 European Wrestling Championships was held from 27 April to 4 May 1975 in Ludwigshafen, West Germany.

== Medal table ==
Rank	Nation	Gold	Silver	Bronze	Total
1	Soviet Union	8	6	4	18
2	Bulgaria	4	2	2	8
3	Poland	2	1	2	5
4	East Germany	1	5	3	9
5	Romania	1	2	1	4
6	Hungary	1	1	2	4
7	Sweden	1	0	1	2
7	West Germany	1	0	1	2
9	Yugoslavia	1	0	0	1
10	Turkey	0	2	2	4
11	Czechoslovakia	0	1	1	2
12	France	0	0	1	1
Totals (12 entries)		20	20	20	60

== Medal summary ==
=== Men's freestyle ===
Event	Gold	Silver	Bronze
48 kg	Hasan Isaev; Bulgaria	Jürgen Möbius; East Germany	Fiodor Baumbach; Soviet Union
52 kg	Arsen Alakhverdiyev; Soviet Union	Ali Rıza Alan; Turkey	Władysław Stecyk; Poland
57 kg	Vladimir Yumin; Soviet Union	Miho Dukov; Bulgaria	Zbigniew Żedzicki; Poland
62 kg	Ivan Yankov; Bulgaria	Helmut Strumpf; East Germany	Zagalav Abdulbekov; Soviet Union
68 kg	Ijaku Gaidarbekov; Soviet Union	Mehmet Sarı; Turkey	Gerhard Weisenberger; West Germany
74 kg	Pavel Pinigin; Soviet Union	Dan Karabin; Czechoslovakia	Servet Aydemir; Turkey
82 kg	Ismail Abilov; Bulgaria	Vasile Iorga; Romania	Günter Spindler; East Germany
90 kg	Horst Stottmeister; East Germany	Paweł Kurczewski; Poland	Piotr Surikov; Soviet Union
100 kg	Ivan Yarygin; Soviet Union	Harald Büttner; East Germany	Dimo Kostov; Bulgaria
+100 kg	Soslan Andiyev; Soviet Union	József Balla; Hungary	Ladislau Șimon; Romania

=== Men's Greco-Roman ===
Event	Gold	Silver	Bronze
48 kg	Constantin Alexandru; Romania	Aleksey Shumakov; Soviet Union	Ferenc Seres; Hungary
52 kg	Rolf Krauß; West Germany	Valeri Arutiunov; Soviet Union	Bilal Tabur; Turkey
57 kg	Ivan Frgić; Yugoslavia	Farhat Mustafin; Soviet Union	Bernd Drechsel; East Germany
62 kg	Kazimierz Lipień; Poland	Anatoli Kavkayev; Soviet Union	Stoyan Lazarov; Bulgaria
68 kg	Andrzej Supron; Poland	Viktor Kuzmin; Soviet Union	Lars-Erik Skiöld; Sweden
74 kg	Jan Karlsson; Sweden	Klaus-Peter Göpfert; East Germany	Vítězslav Mácha; Czechoslovakia
82 kg	Vladimir Cheboksarov; Soviet Union	Ion Enache; Romania	André Bouchoule; France
90 kg	Georgi Raykov; Bulgaria	Vladimir Nechayev; Soviet Union	Dieter Heuer; East Germany
100 kg	Nikolay Balboshin; Soviet Union	Fredi Albrecht; East Germany	József Farkas; Hungary
+100 kg	János Rovnyai; Hungary	Nikola Dinev; Bulgaria	Aleksandr Kolchinsky; Soviet Union
