= 1976 European Wrestling Championships =

- Host city: Soviet Union, Leningrad
- Dates: 16 – 21 April 1976

Champions
- Freestyle: Soviet Union
- Greco-Roman: Soviet Union

The 1976 European Wrestling Championships was held from 16 to 21 April 1976 in Leningrad, Soviet Union.

== Medal table ==
Rank	Nation	Gold	Silver	Bronze	Total
1	Soviet Union	9	6	4	19
2	Bulgaria	3	4	2	9
3	Hungary	2	3	2	7
4	Sweden	2	0	0	2
5	Romania	1	5	1	7
6	West Germany	1	1	1	3
7	Czechoslovakia	1	0	1	2
8	Poland	1	0	0	1
9	East Germany	0	1	5	6
10	Greece	0	0	2	2
11	Norway	0	0	1	1
11	Turkey	0	0	1	1
Totals (12 entries)		20	20	20	60

== Medal summary ==
=== Men's freestyle ===
Event	Gold	Silver	Bronze
48 kg	Anatoly Beloglazov; Soviet Union	Mihály Gyulai; Hungary	Jürgen Möbius; East Germany
52 kg	Henrik Gál; Hungary	Arsen Alakhverdiyev; Soviet Union	Hartmut Reich; East Germany
57 kg	Vladimir Yumin; Soviet Union	László Klinga; Hungary	Hans-Dieter Brüchert; East Germany
62 kg	Sergey Timofeyev; Soviet Union	Petre Coman; Romania	Ivan Yankov; Bulgaria
68 kg	Aleksandr Matveyev; Soviet Union	Ismail Yuseynov; Bulgaria	Eberhard Probst; East Germany
74 kg	Dan Karabin; Czechoslovakia	Marin Pîrcălabu; Romania	Fred Hempel; East Germany
82 kg	Adolf Seger; West Germany	Ismail Abilov; Bulgaria	Viktor Novozhilov; Soviet Union
90 kg	Levan Tediashvili; Soviet Union	Peter Neumair; West Germany	Stelică Morcov; Romania
100 kg	Ivan Yarygin; Soviet Union	Dimo Kostov; Bulgaria	Mehmet Güçlü; Turkey
+100 kg	Ladislau Șimon; Romania	Roland Gehrke; East Germany	Boris Bigayev; Soviet Union

=== Men's Greco-Roman ===
Event	Gold	Silver	Bronze
48 kg	Aleksey Shumakov; Soviet Union	Constantin Alexandru; Romania	Ferenc Seres; Hungary
52 kg	Petar Kirov; Bulgaria	Vladimir Shatunov; Soviet Union	Charalambos Cholidis; Greece
57 kg	Farhat Mustafin; Soviet Union	Mihai Boţilă; Romania	Josef Krysta; Czechoslovakia
62 kg	Kazimierz Lipień; Poland	Ion Păun; Romania	Suren Nalbandyan; Soviet Union
68 kg	Lars-Erik Skiöld; Sweden	Ștefan Rusu; Romania	Shamil Khisamutdinov; Soviet Union
74 kg	Yanko Shopov; Bulgaria	Iosif Berishvili; Soviet Union	Petros Galaktopoulos; Greece
82 kg	Csaba Hegedűs; Hungary	Vladimir Cheboksarov; Soviet Union	Ivan Kolev; Bulgaria
90 kg	Frank Andersson; Sweden	Stoyan Nikolov; Bulgaria	Fred Theobald; West Germany
100 kg	Nikolay Balboshin; Soviet Union	József Farkas; Hungary	Tore Hem; Norway
+100 kg	Aleksandar Tomov; Bulgaria	Aleksandr Kolchinsky; Soviet Union	József Nagy; Hungary
