= 1970 European Wrestling Championships =

- Host city: East Germany, East Berlin
- Dates: 9 – 14 June 1970

Champions
- Freestyle: Soviet Union
- Greco-Roman: East Germany

The 1970 European Wrestling Championships was held from 9 to 17 June 1970 in East Berlin, East Germany.

== Medal table ==
Rank	Nation	Gold	Silver	Bronze	Total
1	Soviet Union	6	3	1	10
2	Bulgaria	5	1	6	12
3	East Germany	3	2	2	7
4	Hungary	1	4	1	6
5	Yugoslavia	1	3	2	6
6	Turkey	1	2	1	4
7	Romania	1	1	3	5
8	Sweden	1	1	0	2
9	West Germany	1	0	1	2
10	Poland	0	2	0	2
11	Finland	0	1	0	1
12	Austria	0	0	1	1
12	Czechoslovakia	0	0	1	1
12	Italy	0	0	1	1
Totals (14 entries)		20	20	20	60

== Medal summary ==
=== Men's freestyle ===
Event	Gold	Silver	Bronze
48 kg	Rafig Hajiyev; Soviet Union	Jürgen Möbius; East Germany	Attila Laták; Hungary
52 kg	Bayu Baev; Bulgaria	Ali Rıza Alan; Turkey	Petre Ciarnău; Romania
57 kg	Ivan Shavov; Bulgaria	Pavel Malian; Soviet Union	Hasan Kahraman; Turkey
62 kg	Enyu Todorov; Bulgaria	Viktor Markelov; Soviet Union	Petre Coman; Romania
68 kg	Ismail Yuseinov; Bulgaria	József Rusznyák; Hungary	Safer Sali; Yugoslavia
74 kg	Zarbeg Beriashvili; Soviet Union	Jan Karlsson; Sweden	Anguel Petrov; Bulgaria
82 kg	Horst Stottmeister; East Germany	Ivan Iliev; Bulgaria	Vasile Iorga; Romania
90 kg	Boris Gurevich; Soviet Union	Károly Bajkó; Hungary	Ramadan Ahmedov; Bulgaria
100 kg	Ahmet Ayık; Turkey	Ivan Yarygin; Soviet Union	Vasil Todorov; Bulgaria
+100 kg	Leonid Kitov; Soviet Union	Gıyasettin Yılmaz; Turkey	Peter Germer; East Germany

=== Men's Greco-Roman ===
Event	Gold	Silver	Bronze
48 kg	Gheorghe Berceanu; Romania	Henrik Gál; Hungary	Lorenzo Calafiore; Italy
52 kg	Petar Kirov; Bulgaria	Boško Marinko; Yugoslavia	Klim Olzoyev; Soviet Union
57 kg	János Varga; Hungary	Ion Baciu; Romania	Jristo Traikov; Bulgaria
62 kg	Heinz-Helmut Wehling; East Germany	Martti Laakso; Finland	Ivan Kaspar; Czechoslovakia
68 kg	Klaus-Peter Göpfert; East Germany	Sreten Damjanović; Yugoslavia	Manfred Schöndorfer; West Germany
74 kg	Viktor Igumenov; Soviet Union	Momir Kecman; Yugoslavia	Franz Berger; Austria
82 kg	Milan Nenadić; Yugoslavia	Adam Ostrowski; Poland	Rudolf Vesper; East Germany
90 kg	Valery Rezantsev; Soviet Union	Lothar Metz; East Germany	Josip Čorak; Yugoslavia
100 kg	Pelle Svensson; Sweden	Ferenc Kiss; Hungary	Marin Kolev; Bulgaria
+100 kg	Roland Bock; West Germany	Edward Wojda; Poland	Aleksandar Tomov; Bulgaria
