= 1972 European Wrestling Championships =

- Host city: Poland, Katowice
- Dates: 24 – 30 May 1972
- Stadium: Spodek Arena

Champions
- Freestyle: Soviet Union
- Greco-Roman: Soviet Union

The 1972 European Wrestling Championships was held from 24 to 30 May 1972 in Katowice, Poland.

== Medal table ==
Rank	Nation	Gold	Silver	Bronze	Total
1	Soviet Union	9	6	1	16
2	Bulgaria	5	7	3	15
3	Romania	1	2	6	9
4	Poland	1	1	4	6
5	East Germany	1	1	2	4
6	Turkey	1	1	0	2
7	Greece	1	0	0	1
7	West Germany	1	0	0	1
9	Finland	0	1	0	1
9	Hungary	0	1	0	1
11	Czechoslovakia	0	0	2	2
11	Yugoslavia	0	0	2	2
Totals (12 entries)		20	20	20	60

== Medal summary ==
=== Men's freestyle ===
Event	Gold	Silver	Bronze
48 kg	Sefer Baygın; Turkey	Jürgen Möbius; East Germany	Ognyan Nikolov; Bulgaria
52 kg	Arsen Alakhverdiyev; Soviet Union	Bayu Baev; Bulgaria	Emil Butu; Romania
57 kg	Ivan Kuleshov; Soviet Union	Ivan Shavov; Bulgaria	Zbigniew Żedzicki; Poland
62 kg	Ruslan Pliyev; Soviet Union	Mehmet Sarı; Turkey	Petre Coman; Romania
68 kg	Ismail Yuseinov; Bulgaria	Petre Poalelungi; Romania	Safer Sali; Yugoslavia
74 kg	Adolf Seger; West Germany	Roman Marsagishvili; Soviet Union	Yancho Pavlov; Bulgaria
82 kg	Vasili Siulzhin; Soviet Union	Ivan Iliev; Bulgaria	Wolfgang Nitschke; East Germany
90 kg	Gennady Strakhov; Soviet Union	Rusi Petrov; Bulgaria	Paweł Kurczewski; Poland
100 kg	Ivan Yarygin; Soviet Union	Vasil Todorov; Bulgaria	Gerd Bachmann; East Germany
+100 kg	Aleksandr Medved; Soviet Union	Osman Duraliev; Bulgaria	Ștefan Stîngu; Romania

=== Men's Greco-Roman ===
Event	Gold	Silver	Bronze
48 kg	Gheorghe Berceanu; Romania	Stefan Angelov; Bulgaria	Vladimir Zubkov; Soviet Union
52 kg	Jan Michalik; Poland	Vitaly Konstantinov; Soviet Union	Petar Kirov; Bulgaria
57 kg	Jristo Traikov; Bulgaria	Yuri Sokolov; Soviet Union	Ion Baciu; Romania
62 kg	Georgi Markov; Bulgaria	Martti Laakso; Finland	Kazimierz Lipień; Poland
68 kg	Jürgen Hähnel; East Germany	Antal Steer; Hungary	Andrzej Supron; Poland
74 kg	Petros Galaktopoulos; Greece	Kasim Djalilov; Soviet Union	Vítězslav Mácha; Czechoslovakia
82 kg	Anatoly Nazarenko; Soviet Union	Ion Gabor; Romania	Miroslav Janota; Czechoslovakia
90 kg	Stoyan Nikolov; Bulgaria	Omar Bliadze; Soviet Union	Darko Nišavić; Yugoslavia
100 kg	Nikolay Yakovenko; Soviet Union	Nicolae Martinescu; Romania	Andrzej Skrzydlewski; Poland
+100 kg	Aleksandar Tomov; Bulgaria	Anatoly Kochnev; Soviet Union	Victor Dolipschi; Romania
