= 1973 Wrestling World Cup =

- Host city: Toledo, Ohio
- Dates: May 19–20
- Stadium: Toledo Field House

Champions
- Freestyle: 10

The 1973 Wrestling World Cup was held from May 19 to 20 in Toledo, Ohio. This was the first World Cup edition, which was contested in the dual meet format instead of individual tournament. The competition drew four freestyle wrestling champion teams, representing Europe, Asia, and North America — Soviet Union, Japan, and Canada respectively, which had the best final standings at the 1973 World Wrestling Championships, and the host country, the United States team. As during the previous edition, the winner of the World Cup was the USSR National Team.

== Medal summary ==
Event	1st place	2nd place	3rd place	4th place
Light Flyweight; 48 kg	Akira Kudo; Japan	Rafig Hajiyev; Soviet Union	Dave Range; United States	Albert Tschitarhart; Canada
Flyweight; 52 kg	Arsen Alakhverdiyev; Soviet Union	Yuji Takada; Japan	Jimmy Carr; United States	Guy Zink; Canada
Bantamweight; 57 kg	Roin Doborjginidze; Soviet Union	Donald Behm; United States	Hiroshi Kaneko; Japan	John Dellagillo; Canada
Featherweight; 62 kg	Viktor Markelov; Soviet Union	Akira Miyahara; Japan	Doug Moses; United States	Tim Wenzel; Canada
Lightweight; 68 kg	Lloyd Keaser; United States	Pavel Pinigin; Soviet Union	Kikuo Wada; Japan	John McPhedran; Canada
Welterweight; 74 kg	Jiichiro Date; Japan	Ruslan Ashuraliyev; Soviet Union	Stanley Dziedzic; United States	John Davis; Canada
Middleweight; 82 kg	John Peterson; United States	Viktor Novozhilov; Soviet Union	Terry Paice; Canada	Masaru Motegi; Japan
Light heavyweight 90 kg	Levan Tediashvili; Soviet Union	Ben Peterson; United States	Makoto Kamada; Japan	Alvin Martin; Canada
Heavyweight; 100 kg	Ivan Yarygin; Soviet Union	Russell Hellickson; United States	Claude Pilon; Canada	none Japan
Super Heavyweight +100 kg	Soslan Andiev; Soviet Union	Michael McCready; United States	Harry Geris; Canada	none Japan

== Sources ==
=== News ===
- "Wrestling Wrestling Cup Set For Toledo". AAU News. 44 (4): 12. April 1974.
- "World Cup Wrestling Trophy". AAU News. 44 (5): 16. May 1974.
- "Russian Wrestlers Win World Cup, Plus Four Dual Matches Against USA". AAU News. 44 (5): 17. June 1974.
- "Japan, Too, Sweeps Four Duals In Tour". 44 (6). June 1974: 17.
- Associated Press (May 21, 1973). "Toledo, Ohio (AP) Lead World Cup Wrestling Championship Summaries". The Akron Beacon Journal: B4.
- "World Cup Toledo, Ohio". Ironwood Daily Globe: 21. May 21, 1973.
- Associated Press (May 21, 1973). "Russians Whip US in Wrestling Toledo, Ohio". The Kansas City Times: 24.
- Associated Press (May 21, 1973). "Soviets Cop World Mat". Pittsburgh Post-Gazette: 26.
- United Press International (May 21, 1973). "Soviets Defeat U.S. Team For World Wrestling Crown". The Lima News: 14.
- Associated Press (May 20, 1973). "Chris Taylor Eager For Shot At Russians". El Paso Times: 52.
