= 1978 European Wrestling Championships =

- Host city: Bulgaria, Sofia(Freestyle); Norway Oslo(Greco-Roman)
- Dates: 5 – 7 May 1979; 22 – 24 April 1979

Champions
- Freestyle: Bulgaria
- Greco-Roman: Romania

The 1978 European Wrestling Championshipswere held in the men's Freestyle style in Sofia Bulgaria 5 – 7 May 1979; the Greco-Romane style in Oslo Norway 8 – 11 April 1981.

== Medal table ==
Rank	Nation	Gold	Silver	Bronze	Total
1	Soviet Union	7	5	1	13
2	Bulgaria	5	4	4	13
3	Romania	4	5	4	13
4	Hungary	1	2	6	9
5	Poland	1	1	3	5
6	East Germany	1	0	1	2
7	Sweden	1	0	0	1
8	Turkey	0	1	1	2
9	Finland	0	1	0	1
9	West Germany	0	1	0	1
Totals (10 entries)		20	20	20	60

== Medal summary ==
=== Men's freestyle ===
Event	Gold	Silver	Bronze
48 kg	Stoyan Stoyanov; Bulgaria	Gheorghe Rașovan; Romania	Mihály Gyulai; Hungary
52 kg	Nermedin Selimov; Bulgaria	Telman Pashayev; Soviet Union	Władysław Stecyk; Poland
57 kg	Buzai Ibraguimov; Soviet Union	Aurel Neagu; Romania	Ivan Tsochev; Bulgaria
62 kg	Miho Dukov; Bulgaria	Saypulla Absaidov; Soviet Union	Zoltán Szalontai; Hungary
68 kg	Ivan Yankov; Bulgaria	Ijaku Gaidarbekov; Soviet Union	Dariusz Czichowski; Poland
74 kg	Pyotr Marta; Soviet Union	Marin Pîrcălabu; Romania	Reşit Karabacak; Turkey
82 kg	Shukri Ajmedov; Bulgaria	Adolf Seger; West Germany	Tiberiu Seregelyi; Romania
90 kg	Uwe Neupert; East Germany	Ivan Guinov; Bulgaria	Vladimir Batnia; Soviet Union
100 kg	Levan Tediashvili; Soviet Union	Mehmet Güçlü; Turkey	Vasile Pușcașu; Romania
+100 kg	Boris Bigayev; Soviet Union	József Balla; Hungary	Marin Guerchev; Bulgaria

=== Men's Greco-Roman ===
Event	Gold	Silver	Bronze
48 kg	Constantin Alexandru; Romania	Anatoli Bozin; Soviet Union	Dietmar Hinz; East Germany
52 kg	Vajtang Blaguidze; Soviet Union	Lajos Rácz; Hungary	Nicu Gingă; Romania
57 kg	Vladimir Pogudin; Soviet Union	Mihai Boţilă; Romania	Józef Lipień; Poland
62 kg	Kazimierz Lipień; Poland	Ion Păun; Romania	Tamás Tóth; Hungary
68 kg	Ștefan Rusu; Romania	Nikolai Dimov; Bulgaria	Károly Gaál; Hungary
74 kg	Ferenc Kocsis; Hungary	Anatoly Bykov; Soviet Union	Yanko Shopov; Bulgaria
82 kg	Ion Draica; Romania	Jan Dołgowicz; Poland	Savo Jristov; Bulgaria
90 kg	Frank Andersson; Sweden	Keijo Manni; Finland	Petre Dicu; Romania
100 kg	Nikolay Balboshin; Soviet Union	Georgi Raykov; Bulgaria	József Farkas; Hungary
+100 kg	Roman Codreanu; Romania	Aleksandar Tomov; Bulgaria	József Nagy; Hungary
