= Jan Michalik =

Polish wrestler (1948–2022)

Jan Michalik (14 April 1948 – 26 January 2022) was a Polish wrestler who competed in the 1968 and 1972 Summer Olympics.

He failed to place at the 1968 Summer Olympics, but placed in joint fourth at the 1972 Summer Olympics. He also finished sixth at the 1968 European Championships, fourth at the 1970 European Championships, fourth at the 1970 World Championships, and fourth at the 1971 World Championships—before winning the gold medals at the 1972 and 1972 European Championships and the silver medal at the 1973 World Championships. Lastly he finished fifth at the 1975 European Championships.

Michalik represented the sports clubs Siły Mysłowice and Wisłoka Dębica. He died in Dębica on 26 January 2022, at the age of 73.
