= 1973 World Sambo Championships =

Sambo competitions

- Location: Tehran, Iran
- Dates: September 6–11
- Competitors: 69 participants from 12 countries

The 1973 World Sambo Championships were held in Tehran, Iran on September 6–11. It was the first World Sambo Championships. The participating teams were from Bulgaria, Mongolia, Iran, Spain, Japan, United States, USSR, Yugoslavia, etc. For the first time World Sambo Championships was part of the FILA World Wrestling Championships (1975 and 1983 editions also included Sambo contest.)

== Team ranking ==
Rank	Team	Points
1	Soviet Union	
2	Mongolia	
3	Iran	
4	Bulgaria	
5	United States	
6	Japan	

== Medal overview ==
Event	Gold	Silver	Bronze
48 kg	Gennady Georgadze; Soviet Union	Habib Fattahi; Iran	Tuxiintor; Mongolia
52 kg	Aleksey Shor; Soviet Union	Munkhiin Puntsag; Mongolia	Jung God Kim; South Korea
57 kg	Mikhail Yunak; Soviet Union	Tutzhlun; Mongolia	Parvan Parvanov; Bulgaria
62 kg	Tzharang; Mongolia	Nikolay Kozitsky; Soviet Union	David Pruzansky; United States
68 kg	David Rudman; Soviet Union	Pavlikov; Bulgaria	Obzhirbal; Mongolia
74 kg	Aleksandr Fedorov; Soviet Union	Gandolgoryn Batsükh; Mongolia	Ali Effati; Iran
82 kg	Česlovas Jezerskas; Soviet Union	Slavko Obadov; Yugoslavia	Wogronch; Mongolia
90 kg	Levan Tediashvili; Soviet Union	Hoshino; Japan	Doktorov; Bulgaria
100 kg	Nikolay Danilov; Soviet Union	Seifollah Javaheri; Iran	Burke Deadrich; United States
+100 kg	Vladimir Klivodenko; Soviet Union	Juan Barbuzano Martín; Spain	Koprivlensky; Bulgaria
