= Valery Rezantsev =

Soviet Greco-Roman wrestler

Personal information
- Born: 8 October 1946 (age 79) Stalinogorsk, Uzlovsky District, Moscow Oblast, Russian SFSR, Soviet Union
- Height: 1.77 m (5 ft 9 1/2 in)
- Weight: 90 kg (198 lb)

Sport
- Sport: Wrestling
- Event: Greco-Roman
- Club: Dynamo Almaty
- Coached by: Vadim Psarev
Medal record
Representing the Soviet Union
Men's Greco-Roman wrestling
Olympic Games
Gold medal – first place	1972 Munich	90 kg
Gold medal – first place	1976 Montreal	90 kg
World Championships
Gold medal – first place	1970 Edmonton	90 kg
Gold medal – first place	1971 Sofia	90 kg
Gold medal – first place	1973 Tehran	90 kg
Gold medal – first place	1974 Katowice	90 kg
Gold medal – first place	1975 Minsk	90 kg
European Championships
Gold medal – first place	1970 Berlin	90 kg
Gold medal – first place	1973 Helsinki	90 kg
Gold medal – first place	1974 Madrid	90 kg

Valery Grigoryevich Rezantsev (Russian: Валерий Григорьевич Резанцев, born 8 October 1946) is a Russian Greco-Roman wrestler. He was an Olympic gold medalist in 1972 and in 1976, competing for the Soviet Union. He won gold medals at the 1970, 1971, 1973, 1974, and 1975 World Wrestling Championships.
