= Stahr =

Stahr (German pronunciation: [ˈʃtaːɐ̯]) is a surname. Notable people with the surname include:

- Adolf Wilhelm Theodor Stahr (1805–1876), German writer and literary historian
- Elvis Jacob Stahr, Jr. (1916–1998), American government official and college president and administrator
- Heinz Stahr (born 1950), retired East German featherweight freestyle wrestler
- Martha Stahr Carpenter (1920–2013), American astronomer
- Mike Stahr (born 1964), American track and field runner, won 1982 and 1983 Millrose Games High School mile
- Nina Stahr (born 1982), German politician
- Paul Stahr (1883–1953), American illustrator for pulp posters, books, and magazines covers
- Thomas Stahr, German bassist and composer
- Walter Stahr, international lawyer and writer

Fictional characters:

- Monroe Stahr, character in The Last Tycoon, an unfinished novel by F. Scott Fitzgerald

== See also ==
- Starr (disambiguation)
- Star (disambiguation)
