= Viktor Kuznetsov =

Viktor Kuznetsov may refer to:

- Viktor Kuznetsov (footballer) (born 1949), Soviet international footballer
- Viktor Kuznetsov (swimmer) (born 1961), Russian swimmer
- Viktor Kuznetsov (wrestling coach) (born 1941), Russian wrestling coach
- Viktor Kuznetsov (speedway rider), speedway rider from the Soviet Union

== See also ==
- Viktor Kuznyetsov (born 1986), Ukrainian long jumper and triple jumper
