= Elmgren =

Elmgren is a surname. Notable people with the surname include:

- Kurt Elmgren (born 1943), Swedish wrestler
- Samuel Elmgren (1771–1834), Finnish painter
- Stefan Elmgren (born 1974), Swedish guitarist
