= 1974 World Wrestling Championships =

Freestyle
- Host city: Istanbul, Turkey
- Dates: 29 August – 1 September 1974

Greco-Roman
- Host city: Katowice, Poland
- Dates: 10–13 October 1974

Champions
- Freestyle: Soviet Union
- Greco-Roman: Soviet Union

The following is the final results of the 1974 World Wrestling Championships. Freestyle competition were held in Istanbul, Turkey and Greco-Roman competition in Katowice, Poland. The Soviet Union won both competitions.

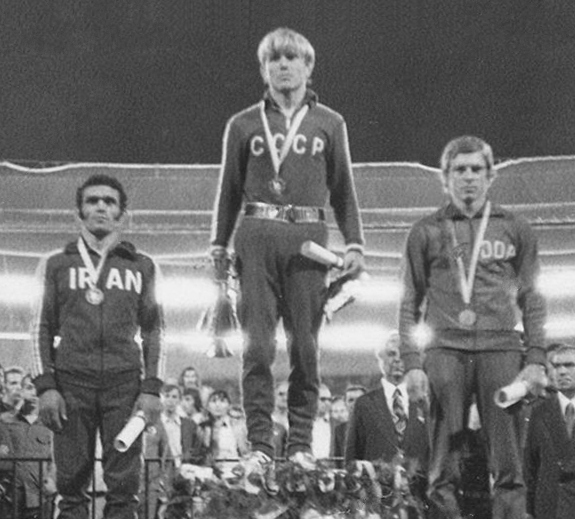
Medal winners of freestyle 57 kg. From left to right, Ramezan Kheder, Vladimir Yumin and Hans-Dieter Brüchert

== Medal table ==
Rank	Nation	Gold	Silver	Bronze	Total
1	Soviet Union	12	5	2	19
2	Bulgaria	3	6	2	11
3	Romania	1	1	5	7
4	Mongolia	1	1	1	3
4	Poland	1	1	1	3
6	Japan	1	1	0	2
7	Czechoslovakia	1	0	0	1
8	East Germany	0	2	2	4
8	Turkey	0	2	2	4
10	Iran	0	1	0	1
11	Hungary	0	0	2	2
12	Canada	0	0	1	1
12	Israel	0	0	1	1
12	Yugoslavia	0	0	1	1
Totals (14 entries)		20	20	20	60

== Team ranking ==
Rank	Men's freestyle		Men's Greco-Roman	
Rank	Team	Points	Team	Points
1	Soviet Union	52	Soviet Union	55
2	Bulgaria	30	Bulgaria	36
3	Turkey	25	Poland	23
4	Mongolia	18	Romania	23
5	Japan	17.5	Hungary	20
6	Romania	14	East Germany	12

== Medal summary ==
=== Freestyle ===
Event	Gold	Silver	Bronze
48 kg	Hasan Isaev; Bulgaria	Rafig Hajiyev; Soviet Union	Gordon Bertie; Canada
52 kg	Yuji Takada; Japan	Ali Rıza Alan; Turkey	Roman Dmitriev; Soviet Union
57 kg	Vladimir Yumin; Soviet Union	Ramezan Kheder; Iran	Hans-Dieter Brüchert; East Germany
62 kg	Zevegiin Oidov; Mongolia	Doncho Zhekov; Bulgaria	Vehbi Akdağ; Turkey
68 kg	Nasrula Nasrulaev; Soviet Union	Yasaburo Sugawara; Japan	Tsedendambyn Natsagdorj; Mongolia
74 kg	Ruslan Ashuraliev; Soviet Union	Yancho Pavlov; Bulgaria	Victor Zilberman; Israel
82 kg	Viktor Novozhilov; Soviet Union	Mehmet Uzun; Turkey	Vasile Iorga; Romania
90 kg	Levan Tediashvili; Soviet Union	Ismail Abilov; Bulgaria	Mehmet Güçlü; Turkey
100 kg	Vladimir Gulyutkin; Soviet Union	Khorloogiin Bayanmönkh; Mongolia	Harald Büttner; East Germany
+100 kg	Ladislau Șimon; Romania	Soslan Andiyev; Soviet Union	Boyan Boev; Bulgaria

=== Greco-Roman ===
Event	Gold	Silver	Bronze
48 kg	Vladimir Zubkov; Soviet Union	Constantin Alexandru; Romania	Georgi Georgiev; Bulgaria
52 kg	Petar Kirov; Bulgaria	Valery Arutyunov; Soviet Union	Nicu Gingă; Romania
57 kg	Farhat Mustafin; Soviet Union	Józef Lipień; Poland	Ivan Frgić; Yugoslavia
62 kg	Kazimierz Lipień; Poland	Anatoly Kavkaev; Soviet Union	László Réczi; Hungary
68 kg	Nelson Davidyan; Soviet Union	Heinz-Helmut Wehling; East Germany	Andrzej Supron; Poland
74 kg	Vítězslav Mácha; Czechoslovakia	Klaus-Peter Göpfert; East Germany	Iosif Berishvili; Soviet Union
82 kg	Anatoly Nazarenko; Soviet Union	Dimitar Ivanov; Bulgaria	Ion Enache; Romania
90 kg	Valery Rezantsev; Soviet Union	Stoyan Nikolov; Bulgaria	Dumitru Manea; Romania
100 kg	Nikolay Balboshin; Soviet Union	Kamen Goranov; Bulgaria	Nicolae Martinescu; Romania
+100 kg	Aleksandar Tomov; Bulgaria	Shota Morchiladze; Soviet Union	János Rovnyai; Hungary
