= 1977 European Wrestling Championships =

- Host city: Bursa, Turkey
- Dates: 26 – 29 May 1977

Champions
- Freestyle: Soviet Union
- Greco-Roman: Romania

The 1977 European Wrestling Championships was held from 26 – 29 May 1977 in Bursa, Turkey.

== Medal table ==
Rank	Nation	Gold	Silver	Bronze	Total
1	Soviet Union	8	7	4	19
2	Bulgaria	3	6	1	10
3	Romania	3	2	5	10
4	Hungary	2	0	1	3
5	East Germany	1	1	1	3
6	Czechoslovakia	1	0	1	2
7	Finland	1	0	0	1
7	Yugoslavia	1	0	0	1
9	Turkey	0	3	3	6
10	Sweden	0	1	0	1
11	Poland	0	0	4	4
Totals (11 entries)		20	20	20	60

== Medal summary ==
=== Men's freestyle ===
Event	Gold	Silver	Bronze
48 kg	Stoyan Stoyanov; Bulgaria	Sergey Kornilayev; Soviet Union	Gheorghe Rașovan; Romania
52 kg	Hartmut Reich; East Germany	Aleksandr Ivanov; Soviet Union	Władysław Stecyk; Poland
57 kg	Oleg Alexeyev; Soviet Union	Mehmed Selmanov; Bulgaria	Fevzi Gökdoğan; Turkey
62 kg	Vladimir Yumin; Soviet Union	Miho Dukov; Bulgaria	Lajos Sandor; Romania
68 kg	Shaban Sejdiu; Yugoslavia	Mehmet Sarı; Turkey	Ijaku Gaidarbekov; Soviet Union
74 kg	Pyotr Marta; Soviet Union	Reşit Karabacak; Turkey	Emilian; Romania
82 kg	Ismail Abilov; Bulgaria	Jasan Zanguiyev; Soviet Union	Jan Górski; Poland
90 kg	Anatoli Prokopchuk; Soviet Union	Shukri Lyutviev; Bulgaria	İsmail Temiz; Turkey
100 kg	Aslanbek Bisultanov; Soviet Union	Mehmet Güçlü; Turkey	Harald Büttner; East Germany
100+ kg	Vladimir Parshukov; Soviet Union	Marin Guerchev; Bulgaria	Petr Drozda; Czechoslovakia

=== Men's Greco-Roman ===
Event	Gold	Silver	Bronze
48 kg	Constantin Alexandru; Romania	Anatoli Bozin; Soviet Union	Wiesław Kuciński; Poland
52 kg	Lajos Rácz; Hungary	Nicu Gingă; Romania	Kamil Fatkulin; Soviet Union
57 kg	Pertti Ukkola; Finland	Farhat Mustafin; Soviet Union	Mihai Boţilă; Romania
62 kg	Ion Păun; Romania	Nelson Davidyan; Soviet Union	László Réczi; Hungary
68 kg	Suren Nalbandyan; Soviet Union	Ștefan Rusu; Romania	Erol Mutlu; Turkey
74 kg	Vítězslav Mácha; Czechoslovakia	Klaus-Peter Göpfert; East Germany	Yanko Shopov; Bulgaria
82 kg	Ion Draica; Romania	Savo Jristov; Bulgaria	Anatoly Nazarenko; Soviet Union
90 kg	Csaba Hegedűs; Hungary	Frank Andersson; Sweden	Airapet Minasian; Soviet Union
100 kg	Nikolay Balboshin; Soviet Union	Georgi Raykov; Bulgaria	Andrzej Skrzydlewski; Poland
100+ kg	Nikola Dinev; Bulgaria	Aleksandr Kolchinsky; Soviet Union	Victor Dolipschi; Romania
