= Mohsen Farahvashi =

Iranian freestyle wrestler

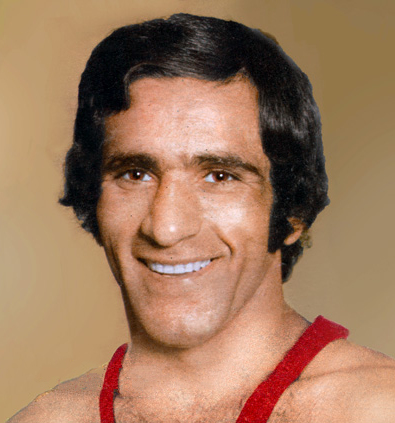

Personal information
- Born: 21 July 1947 (age 78)
- Height: 165 cm (5 ft 5 in)

Sport
- Sport: Freestyle wrestling
Medal record
Representing Iran
World Championships
Gold medal – first place	1973 Tehran	57 kg
Asian Games
Gold medal – first place	1974 Tehran	57 kg
Summer Universiade
Silver medal – second place	1973 Moscow	57 kg

Mohsen Mohamed Farahvash Fashandi (Persian: محسن محمد فره وش فشندى; born 21 July 1947) is a retired Iranian featherweight freestyle wrestler. He won a world title in 1973 and a gold medal at the 1974 Asian Games. He placed fourth at the 1976 Summer Olympics.

Farahvashi married Ms. Sharifi in November 1974 in Tehran. He has a brother and a sister.
