= Burke Deadrich =

American wrestler (1945–2012)

Personal information
- Born: June 3, 1945 Oakland, California, U.S.
- Died: November 18, 2012 (aged 67) Vallejo, California, U.S.

Sport
- Country: United States
- Sport: Freestyle, Greco-Roman, and Sambo
- Events: Freestyle, Folkstyle, Greco-Roman, and Sambo
- College team: Southern Illinois
- Team: USA
Medal record
Representing the United States
Sambo
World Championships
Bronze medal – third place	1973 Tehran	100 kg
Freestyle wrestling
Summer Universiade
Silver medal – second place	1973 Moscow	100 kg

Burke "Buck" Deadrich (30 June 1945 – 18 November 2012) was an American wrestler, born in Oakland, California. He competed in the 1972 Summer Olympics as a Greco-Roman wrestler.

== Career ==
Deadrich was a 1969 graduate of Southern Illinois University and earned a master's degree from the University of California at Berkeley in 1975. He competed in football and wrestling in college, first at Chabot College and then at Southern Illinois University. He became the sports information director, wrestling coach and college photographer at California Lutheran University in 1975.

He was a member of the United States World Teams in both freestyle and Greco-Roman wrestling, and was on the 1972 U.S. Olympic team as a Greco-Roman wrestler. In 1973, Deadrich attended the World University Games in Moscow, Russia and won a silver medal in freestyle wrestling. That same year he also won a bronze medal in the Sambo event of the 1973 World Wrestling Championships in Tehran, Iran. Deadrich was also awarded the Sports Journal Award for a film on wrestling in Russia, “Wrestling in Russia-Amateur Diplomacy.” He was a seven-time national champion in total, winning five times in freestyle wrestling and two times in Greco-Roman wrestling.

== Retirement and later life ==
After becoming the wrestling coach at California Lutheran University in 1975, the college wrestling team improved, and during his tenure, a number of California Luthern wrestlers competed in national events. California Luthern wrestlers Ed Fleming won silver at the Pan American Games of 1980, while Kim Coddington won 16 of 20 matches in 1977 and qualified for the national championships. Deadrich also recruited wrestlers to the college. Upon his resignation from California Luthern, the college wrestling program struggled for about two years, before being dropped as a competitive college sport.
