= Telman Pashayev =

Soviet wrestler (born 1953)

Personal information
- Native name: Пашаев Тельман Паша-оглы Paşayev Telman Paşa oğlu
- Born: 5 March 1953 (age 73) Baku, Azerbaijan Soviet Socialist Republic
Medal record
Men's freestyle wrestling
Representing the Soviet Union
World Championships
Silver medal – second place	1975 Minsk	52 kg
European Championships
Silver medal – second place	1974 Madrid	52 kg
Silver medal – second place	1978 Sofia	52 kg

Telman Pasha oglu Pashayev (Russian: Пашаев Тельман Паша-оглы; Azerbaijani: Paşayev Telman Paşa oğlu; born 5 March 1953, in Baku, Azerbaijan SSR) is a former Soviet wrestler.
