= Richard Barraclough =

British wrestler (born 1943)

Personal information
- Nationality: British (English)
- Born: 6 March 1943 (age 83) Upper Agbrigg, Yorkshire, England
- Height: 176 cm (5 ft 9 in)
- Weight: 82 kg (181 lb)

Sport
- Sport: Wrestling

Richard William Barraclough (born 6 March 1943) is a retired wrestler from England who competed at the 1972 Summer Olympics.

== Biography ==
Barraclough represented England in the 90 kg light-heavyweight, at the 1970 British Commonwealth Games in Edinburgh, Scotland.

At the 1972 Olympic Games in Munich, he participated in the men's freestyle 82 kg category.

Barraclough was a three-times winner of the British Wrestling Championships in 1970, 1971 and 1972.
