= 1973 World Wrestling Championships =

- Host city: Tehran, Iran
- Dates: 6–14 September 1973
- Stadium: Nassiri Stadium

Champions
- Freestyle: Soviet Union
- Greco-Roman: Soviet Union

The 1973 World Wrestling Championships were held in Tehran, Iran. For the first and subsequently the last time Sambo wrestling was included as part of the World Wrestling Championships programme. U.S. National Team included Buck Deadrich, David Pruzansky and Wayne Baughman. Deadrich and Pruzansky both captured bronze medals

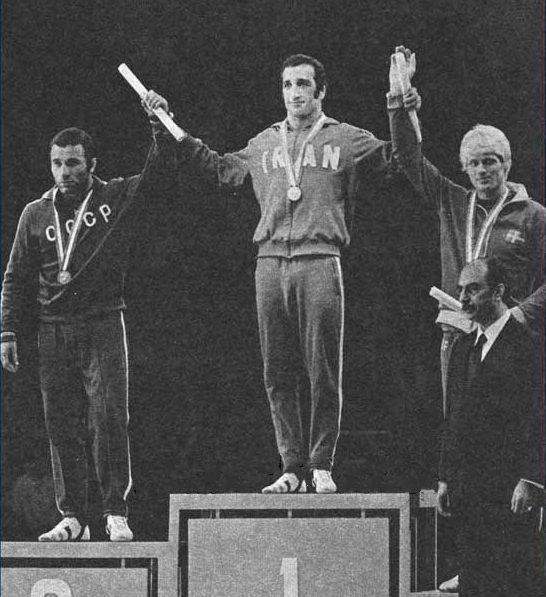
Medal winners of freestyle 74 kg. From left to right, Ruslan Ashuraliev, Mansour Barzegar and Jan Karlsson

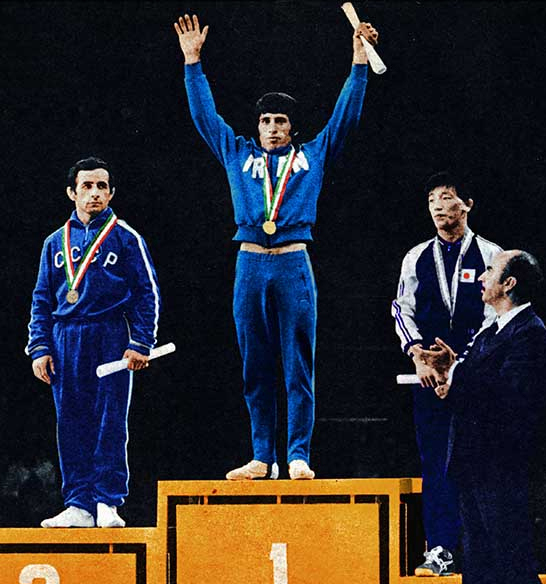
Medal winners of freestyle 52 kg. From left to right, Arsen Alakhverdiev, Ebrahim Javadi and Yuji Takada

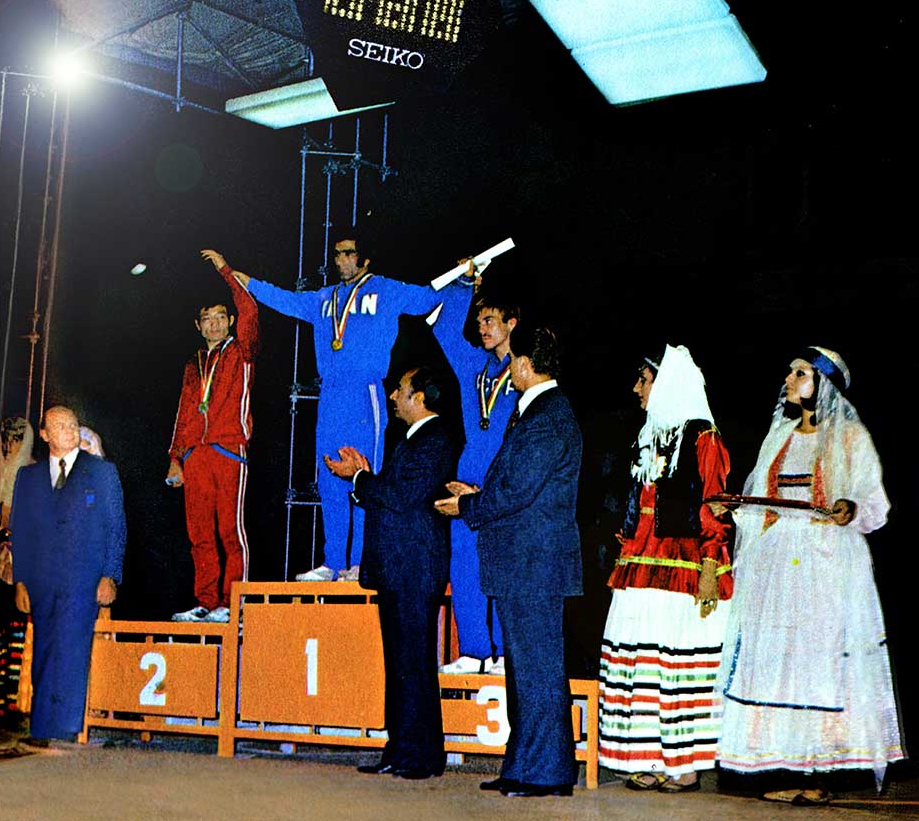
Medal winners of freestyle 57 kg. From left to right, Megdiin Khoilogdorj, Mohsen Farahvashi and Vladimir Yumin

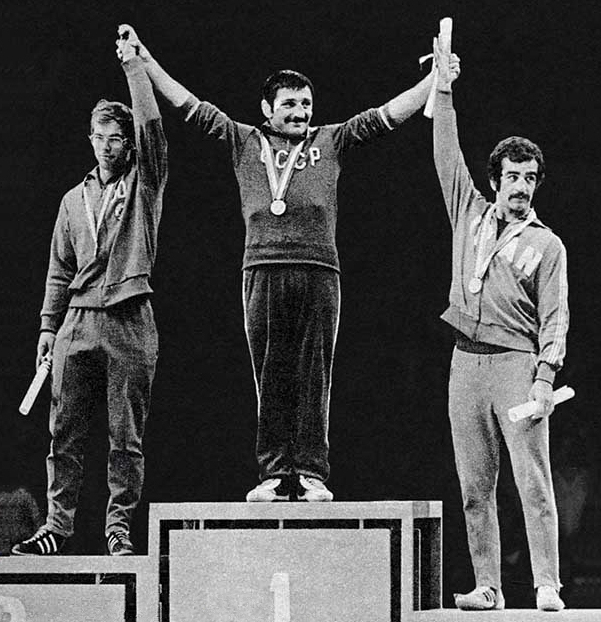
Medal winners of freestyle 62 kg. From left to right, Heinz Stahr, Zagalav Abdulbekov and Mohammad Reza Navaei

== Medal table ==
Rank	Nation	Gold	Silver	Bronze	Total
1	Soviet Union	11	5	2	18
2	Iran	3	0	2	5
3	Bulgaria	2	3	4	9
4	Poland	2	3	1	6
5	Romania	1	1	1	3
6	United States	1	0	1	2
7	East Germany	0	2	2	4
8	Yugoslavia	0	2	0	2
9	Hungary	0	1	3	4
10	Czechoslovakia	0	1	1	2
10	Mongolia	0	1	1	2
10	Sweden	0	1	1	2
13	Japan	0	0	1	1
Totals (13 entries)		20	20	20	60

== Team ranking ==
Rank	Men's freestyle		Men's Greco-Roman	
Rank	Team	Points	Team	Points
1	Soviet Union	55	Soviet Union	47
2	Iran	28	Poland	35
3	Bulgaria	28	Bulgaria	30
4	Mongolia	18	Romania	16.5
5	United States	16	Yugoslavia	16
6	Romania	11	Hungary	13

== Medal summary ==
=== Freestyle ===
Event	Gold	Silver	Bronze
48 kg	Roman Dmitriev; Soviet Union	Hasan Isaev; Bulgaria	Ochirdolgoryn Enkhtaivan; Mongolia
52 kg	Ebrahim Javadi; Iran	Arsen Alakhverdiev; Soviet Union	Yuji Takada; Japan
57 kg	Mohsen Farahvashi; Iran	Megdiin Khoilogdorj; Mongolia	Vladimir Yumin; Soviet Union
62 kg	Zagalav Abdulbekov; Soviet Union	Heinz Stahr; East Germany	Mohammad Reza Navaei; Iran
68 kg	Lloyd Keaser; United States	Nasrula Nasrulaev; Soviet Union	János Kocsis; Hungary
74 kg	Mansour Barzegar; Iran	Ruslan Ashuraliev; Soviet Union	Jan Karlsson; Sweden
82 kg	Vasily Syulshin; Soviet Union	Vasile Iorga; Romania	Ismail Abilov; Bulgaria
90 kg	Levan Tediashvili; Soviet Union	Horst Stottmeister; East Germany	Ben Peterson; United States
100 kg	Ivan Yarygin; Soviet Union	József Csatári; Hungary	Dimitar Nekov; Bulgaria
+100 kg	Soslan Andiyev; Soviet Union	Boyan Boev; Bulgaria	Ladislau Șimon; Romania

=== Greco-Roman ===
Event	Gold	Silver	Bronze
48 kg	Vladimir Zubkov; Soviet Union	Ryszard Świerad; Poland	Ferenc Seres; Hungary
52 kg	Nicu Gingă; Romania	Jan Michalik; Poland	Rahim Aliabadi; Iran
57 kg	Józef Lipień; Poland	Rustam Kazakov; Soviet Union	Hristo Traykov; Bulgaria
62 kg	Kazimierz Lipień; Poland	Anatoly Kavkaev; Soviet Union	László Réczi; Hungary
68 kg	Shamil Khisamutdinov; Soviet Union	Sreten Damjanović; Yugoslavia	Heinz-Helmut Wehling; East Germany
74 kg	Ivan Kolev; Bulgaria	Jan Karlsson; Sweden	Klaus-Peter Göpfert; East Germany
82 kg	Leonid Liberman; Soviet Union	Milan Nenadić; Yugoslavia	Miroslav Janota; Czechoslovakia
90 kg	Valery Rezantsev; Soviet Union	Czesław Kwieciński; Poland	Stoyan Nikolov; Bulgaria
100 kg	Nikolay Balboshin; Soviet Union	Kamen Goranov; Bulgaria	Andrzej Skrzydlewski; Poland
+100 kg	Aleksandar Tomov; Bulgaria	Petr Kment; Czechoslovakia	Shota Morchiladze; Soviet Union

== See also ==
- 1973 World Sambo Championships
