= Mohammad Reza Navaei =

Iranian wrestler (1948–2020)

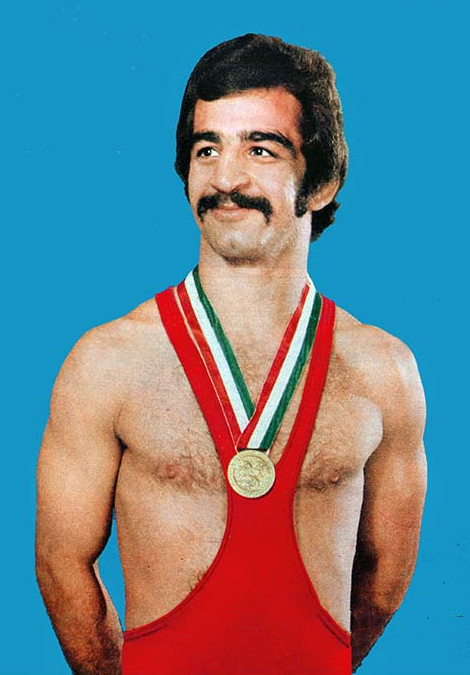

Personal information
- Native name: محمدرضا نوايى
- Born: 1 December 1948 Tehran, Iran
- Died: 3 August 2020 (aged 71) Tehran, Iran
- Height: 169 cm (5 ft 7 in)
- Weight: 62 kg (137 lb)

Sport
- Sport: Wrestling
- Event: Freestyle
Medal record
Representing Iran
World Wrestling Championships
Bronze medal – third place	1973 Tehran	62 kg
Asian Games
Bronze medal – third place	1974 Tehran	62 kg
Summer Universiade
Silver medal – second place	1973 Moscow	62 kg

Mohammad Reza Navaei (Persian: محمدرضا نوايى, 1 December 1948 – 3 August 2020) was an Iranian lightweight freestyle wrestler. He won bronze medals at the 1973 World Wrestling Championships and 1974 Asian Games, and competed at the 1976 Summer Olympics.

== Coaching career ==
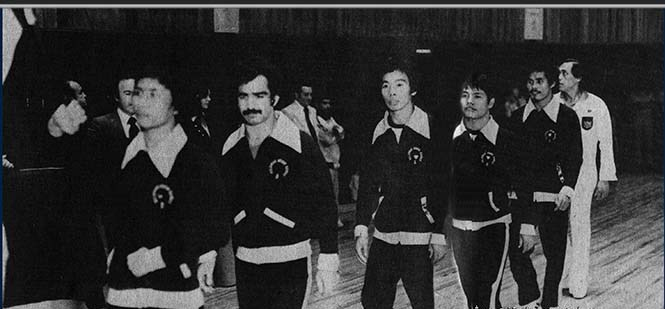
Indonesia's National wrestling team at the opening ceremony, along with Iranian coach Mohammad Reza Navaei in 1978 Mexico city

Reza Navaei was the coach of Iran's wrestling team at the 1988 Summer Olympics and an assistant coach at 1992 Summer Olympics, 1990 World Wrestling Championships, 1991, 1993, and 1994. He was also the coach of Indonesia's team at the 1978 World Wrestling Championships.
