= Rafig Hajiyev =

Soviet wrestler (born 1946)

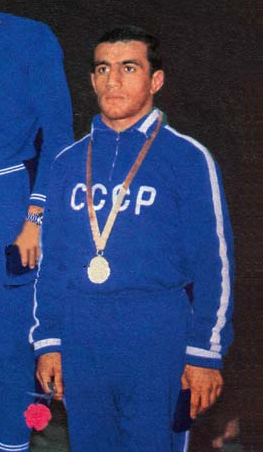
- Hajiyev in 1970

Personal information
- Born: 1946 (age 79–80) Baku, Azerbaijan

Sport
- Sport: Freestyle wrestling
- Club: Dynamo Baku
Medal record
Representing the Soviet Union
World Championships
Silver medal – second place	1974 Katowice	48 kg
European Championships
Gold medal – first place	1970 Berlin	48 kg
Silver medal – second place	1973 Helsinki	48 kg
World Cup
Silver medal – second place	1973 Toledo	48 kg

Rafig Hajiyev (Russian: Рафик Гаджиев, Azerbaijani: Rafiq Hacıyev, born 1946 in Baku) is a retired Soviet freestyle wrestler of Azerbaijani origin. He held the Soviet and European titles in 1970, and won silver medals at the 1973 European and 1974 world championships. He retired from competitions in 1976 and then had a long career as a police officer, reaching the rank of colonel. He remained active in wrestling as a coach.
