= Vladimir Zubkov (wrestler) =

Russian Greco-Roman wrestler

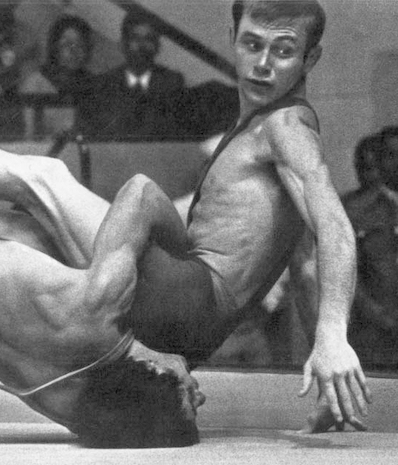
- Zubkov (top) at the 1972 Olympics

Personal information
- Born: 30 April 1948 (age 78) Novosibirsk, Russia
- Height: 150 cm (4 ft 11 in)

Sport
- Sport: Greco-Roman wrestling
- Club: Burevestnik Minsk
- Coached by: Viktor Kuznetsov
Medal record
Representing the Soviet Union
World Championships
Silver medal – second place	1970 Edmonton	-48 kg
Gold medal – first place	1971 Sofia	-48 kg
Gold medal – first place	1973 Tehran	-48 kg
Gold medal – first place	1974 Katowice	-48 kg
Gold medal – first place	1975 Minsk	-48 kg

Vladimir Anatolievich Zubkov (Russian: Владимир Анатольевич Зубков, born 30 April 1948) is a retired Greco-Roman wrestler from Russia. He won the world light-flyweight title in 1971 and 1973–1975, placing second in 1970, and competed at the 1972 Summer Olympics. After retiring from competitions he worked as a wrestling coach, and is currently training the Austrian national team.
