= Anatoly Kavkaev =

Soviet wrestler (1949–2021)

Anatoly Kavkayev Anatoly Kavkaev
Personal information
- Born: July 1, 1949
- Died: 31 August 2021 (aged 72)
- Weight: 62 kg (137 lb)

Sport
- Country: Soviet Union
- Sport: Greco-Roman wrestling
- Coached by: Georgy Vershinin
Medal record
Men's Greco-Roman wrestling
Wrestling World Championships
Silver medal – second place	1973 Tehran	62 kg
Silver medal – second place	1974 Katowice	62 kg
FILA Wrestling European Championships
Gold medal – first place	1974 Madrid	62 kg
Silver medal – second place	1975 Ludwigshafen	62 kg
- Updated on 6 October 2016

Anatoly Kavkayev (Russian: Анатолий Петрович Кавкаев) (1 July 1949 – 31 August 2021) was a Soviet Greco-Roman wrestler, champion of the USSR and the Europe, medalist of world championship. Started to train in 1964. Took part in seven USSR championships (1971–1977). Won some international tournaments.

== Sport results ==
- 1971 USSR Greco-Roman Wrestling championship - (silver) ;
- 1972 USSR Greco-Roman Wrestling championship - (bronze) ;
- 1974 USSR Greco-Roman Wrestling championship - (gold) ;
- Greco-Roman Wrestling at 1975 Soviet Spartakiad - (silver) ;
