= 1971 World Wrestling Championships =

- Host city: Sofia, Bulgaria
- Dates: 27 August – 5 September 1971
- Stadium: Vasil Levski National Stadium

Champions
- Freestyle: Soviet Union
- Greco-Roman: Bulgaria

The 1971 World Wrestling Championships were held in Sofia, Bulgaria from 27 August to 5 September 1971.

== Medal table ==
Rank	Nation	Gold	Silver	Bronze	Total
1	Soviet Union	9	3	1	13
2	Bulgaria	4	4	6	14
3	Iran	2	2	0	4
4	United States	1	1	1	3
5	Yugoslavia	1	1	0	2
6	Japan	1	0	3	4
7	Hungary	1	0	2	3
8	Sweden	1	0	0	1
9	Romania	0	2	2	4
10	East Germany	0	2	1	3
10	Mongolia	0	2	1	3
10	Poland	0	2	1	3
13	Turkey	0	1	0	1
14	Czechoslovakia	0	0	1	1
14	Greece	0	0	1	1
Totals (15 entries)		20	20	20	60

== Team ranking ==
Rank	Men's freestyle		Men's Greco-Roman	
Rank	Team	Points	Team	Points
1	Soviet Union	42.5	Bulgaria	46
2	Iran	31	Soviet Union	39.5
3	Bulgaria	31	Hungary	23
4	Japan	20	Yugoslavia	18
5	Mongolia	19.5	Romania	16
6	United States	19	Poland	14.5

== Medal summary ==
=== Freestyle ===
Event	Gold	Silver	Bronze
48 kg kg	Ebrahim Javadi; Iran	Bazarragchaagiin Jamsran; Mongolia	Ognyan Nikolov; Bulgaria
52 kg	Mohammad Ghorbani; Iran	Bayu Baev; Bulgaria	Aminula Nasrulaev; Soviet Union
57 kg	Hideaki Yanagida; Japan	Donald Behm; United States	Megdiin Khoilogdorj; Mongolia
62 kg	Zagalav Abdulbekov; Soviet Union	Shamseddin Seyed-Abbasi; Iran	Kiyoshi Abe; Japan
68 kg	Dan Gable; United States	Vasily Kazakhov; Soviet Union	Ismail Yuseinov; Bulgaria
74 kg	Yury Gusov; Soviet Union	Mohammad Farhangdoust; Iran	Ludovic Ambruș; Romania
82 kg	Levan Tediashvili; Soviet Union	Horst Stottmeister; East Germany	Vasile Iorga; Romania
90 kg	Rusi Petrov; Bulgaria	Paweł Kurczewski; Poland	Russ Hellickson; United States
100 kg	Shota Lomidze; Soviet Union	Khorloogiin Bayanmönkh; Mongolia	Vasil Todorov; Bulgaria
+100 kg	Aleksandr Medved; Soviet Union	Osman Duraliev; Bulgaria	Stanisław Makowiecki; Poland

=== Greco-Roman ===
Event	Gold	Silver	Bronze
48 kg	Vladimir Zubkov; Soviet Union	Hızır Sarı; Turkey	Stefan Angelov; Bulgaria
52 kg	Petar Kirov; Bulgaria	Gheorghe Stoiciu; Romania	József Doncsecz; Hungary
57 kg	Rustam Kazakov; Soviet Union	Hristo Traykov; Bulgaria	János Varga; Hungary
62 kg	Georgi Markov; Bulgaria	Kazimierz Lipień; Poland	Hideo Fujimoto; Japan
68 kg	Sreten Damjanović; Yugoslavia	Klaus-Peter Göpfert; East Germany	Takashi Tanoue; Japan
74 kg	Viktor Igumenov; Soviet Union	Momir Kecman; Yugoslavia	Petros Galaktopoulos; Greece
82 kg	Csaba Hegedűs; Hungary	Anatoly Nazarenko; Soviet Union	Kiril Dimitrov; Bulgaria
90 kg	Valery Rezantsev; Soviet Union	Stoyan Nikolov; Bulgaria	Lothar Metz; East Germany
100 kg	Pelle Svensson; Sweden	Nicolae Martinescu; Romania	Marin Kolev; Bulgaria
+100 kg	Aleksandar Tomov; Bulgaria	Anatoly Roshchin; Soviet Union	Petr Kment; Czechoslovakia
