= Vasile Iorga =

Romanian wrestler (1945–2003)

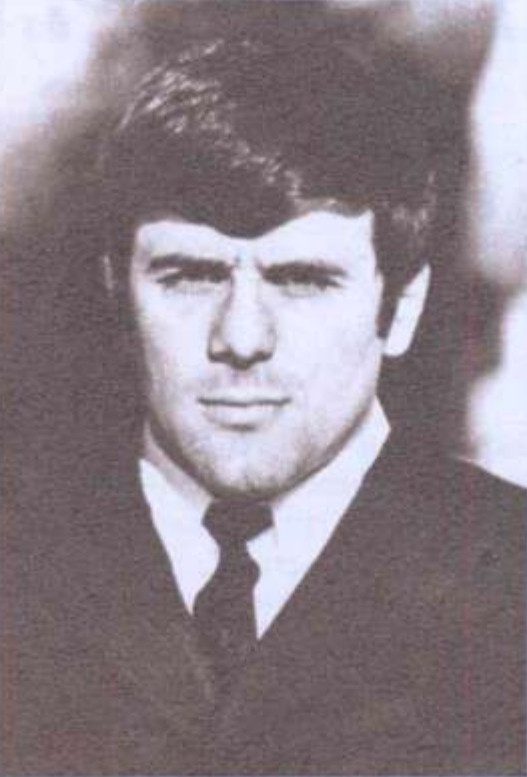
- Vasile Iorga, 1972

Personal information
- Born: 19 February 1945 Mărașu, Romania
- Died: April 2003 (aged 58)

Sport
- Sport: Freestyle wrestling
Medal record
Representing Romania
Olympic Games
Bronze medal – third place	1972 Munich	82 kg
World Championships
Silver medal – second place	1973 Tehran	82 kg
Bronze medal – third place	1970 Edmonton	82 kg
Bronze medal – third place	1971 Sofia	82 kg
Bronze medal – third place	1975 Minsk	82 kg
European Championships
Silver medal – second place	1975 Ludwigshafen	82 kg
Bronze medal – third place	1970 East Berlin	82 kg
Bronze medal – third place	1974 Madrid	82 kg
Summer Universiade
Silver medal – second place	1973 Moscow	82 kg

Vasile Iorga (19 February 1945 – April 2003) was a Romanian wrestler who competed in the 1972 Summer Olympics and in the 1976 Summer Olympics.
