= Heinz Stahr =

East German wrestler (born 1950)

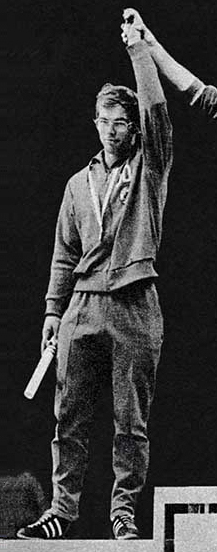
- Stahr at the 1973 World Championships

Personal information
- Born: 5 June 1950 (age 76) Treuenbrietzen, Germany

Sport
- Sport: Freestyle wrestling
Medal record
Representing East Germany
World Championships
Silver medal – second place	1973 Tehran	-62 kg

Karl-Heinz Stahr (born 5 June 1950) is a retired East German featherweight freestyle wrestler who won a silver medal at the 1973 World Championships. He started as a gymnast and then changed to wrestling. After retiring from competitions he ran a car service in Luckenwalde.
