= Jimmy Martinetti =

Swiss wrestler

Jimmy Martinetti (born 5 July 1946) is a Swiss former wrestler who competed in the 1968 Summer Olympics and in the 1972 Summer Olympics.
