= Viktor Kuznetsov (wrestling coach) =

Personal information
- Born: 14 December 1941 (age 84) Novosibirsk, Russia

Sport
- Sport: Greco-Roman wrestling
- Club: Dynamo Novosibirsk
- Coached by: Igor Belousov

Viktor Mikhailovich Kuznetsov (Russian: Виктор Михайлович Кузнецов, born 14 December 1941) is a Greco-Roman wrestling coach from Russia. His trainees include Aleksandr Karelin, Roman Vlasov and Vladimir Zubkov.

Kuznetsov took up wrestling in 1957, and retired in 1962 to become a coach in his club Dynamo Novosibirsk. He later worked at different sports organizations in Novosibirsk, and since 1994 heads the wrestling school associated with the Karelin's Fund. Kuznetsov graduated from the institutes of physical education in Novosibirsk and Omsk; he is married and has a son Vadim. For his achievements he was awarded the Order of the Badge of Honour and Order of Friendship of Peoples.
