= Vladimir Gulyutkin =

Soviet wrestler (born 1942)

Personal information
- Born: 29 March 1942 (age 84) Kizel, Russia

Sport
- Sport: Freestyle wrestling
- Club: Spartak Kiev
Medal record
Representing the Soviet Union
World Championships
Gold medal – first place	1970 Edmonton	-100 kg
Gold medal – first place	1974 Istanbul	-100 kg
Bronze medal – third place	1975 Minsk	-100 kg
European Championships
Gold medal – first place	1968 Skopje	-97 kg
Gold medal – first place	1969 Sofia	-100 kg
Gold medal – first place	1973 Lausanne	-100 kg

Vladimir Yakovlevich Gulyutkin (Russian: Владимир Яковлевич Гулюткин, born 29 March 1942) is a retired Soviet heavyweight freestyle wrestler. He won the world title in 1970 and 1974, the European title in 1968, 1969 and 1972, and the Soviet title in 1968–71 and 1975.
