= 1977 World Wrestling Championships =

Freestyle
- Host city: Lausanne, Switzerland
- Dates: 21–23 October 1977

Greco-Roman
- Host city: Gothenburg, Sweden
- Dates: 14–17 October 1977

Champions
- Freestyle: Soviet Union
- Greco-Roman: Soviet Union

The following is the final results of the 1977 World Wrestling Championships. Freestyle competition were held in Lausanne, Switzerland and Greco-Roman competition were held in Gothenburg, Sweden.

== Medal table ==
Rank	Nation	Gold	Silver	Bronze	Total
1	Soviet Union	9	5	0	14
2	Japan	2	1	0	3
3	Bulgaria	1	2	7	10
4	Romania	1	2	2	5
5	East Germany	1	2	1	4
6	Sweden	1	1	1	3
6	United States	1	1	1	3
8	Hungary	1	0	3	4
9	Czechoslovakia	1	0	0	1
9	Finland	1	0	0	1
9	West Germany	1	0	0	1
12	Yugoslavia	0	2	2	4
13	Poland	0	2	0	2
14	Iran	0	1	1	2
15	Turkey	0	1	0	1
16	Mongolia	0	0	1	1
16	South Korea	0	0	1	1
Totals (17 entries)		20	20	20	60

== Team ranking ==
Rank	Men's freestyle		Men's Greco-Roman	
Rank	Team	Points	Team	Points
1	Soviet Union	46	Soviet Union	39
2	Bulgaria	23	Bulgaria	32
3	East Germany	19	Romania	25
4	United States	18	Hungary	21
5	Japan	17	Sweden	20
6	Iran	17	Yugoslavia	13.5

== Medal summary ==
=== Freestyle ===
Event	Gold	Silver	Bronze
48 kg	Anatoly Beloglazov; Soviet Union	Nobuo Fujisawa; Japan	Kim Hwa-kyung; South Korea
52 kg	Yuji Takada; Japan	Władysław Stecyk; Poland	Hartmut Reich; East Germany
57 kg	Tadashi Sasaki; Japan	Viktor Alekseev; Soviet Union	Jack Reinwand; United States
62 kg	Vladimir Yumin; Soviet Union	Jim Humphrey; United States	Miho Dukov; Bulgaria
68 kg	Pavel Pinigin; Soviet Union	Šaban Sejdiu; Yugoslavia	Zevegiin Oidov; Mongolia
74 kg	Stanley Dziedzic; United States	Mansour Barzegar; Iran	Aleksandar Nanev; Bulgaria
82 kg	Adolf Seger; West Germany	Magomedkhan Aratsilov; Soviet Union	István Kovács; Hungary
90 kg	Anatoly Prokopchuk; Soviet Union	Uwe Neupert; East Germany	Shukri Ahmedov; Bulgaria
100 kg	Aslanbek Bisultanov; Soviet Union	Harald Büttner; East Germany	Vasile Pușcașu; Romania
+100 kg	Soslan Andiyev; Soviet Union	Marin Gerchev; Bulgaria	József Balla; Hungary

=== Greco-Roman ===
Event	Gold	Silver	Bronze
48 kg	Aleksey Shumakov; Soviet Union	Salih Bora; Turkey	Todor Genchev; Bulgaria
52 kg	Nicu Gingă; Romania	Kamil Fatkulin; Soviet Union	Morad Ali Shirani; Iran
57 kg	Pertti Ukkola; Finland	Farhat Mustafin; Soviet Union	Ivan Frgić; Yugoslavia
62 kg	László Réczi; Hungary	Kazimierz Lipień; Poland	Ion Păun; Romania
68 kg	Heinz-Helmut Wehling; East Germany	Lars-Erik Skiöld; Sweden	Nikolay Dimov; Bulgaria
74 kg	Vítězslav Mácha; Czechoslovakia	Yanko Shopov; Bulgaria	Ferenc Kocsis; Hungary
82 kg	Vladimir Cheboksarov; Soviet Union	Ion Draica; Romania	Momir Petković; Yugoslavia
90 kg	Frank Andersson; Sweden	Petre Dicu; Romania	Stoyan Nikolov; Bulgaria
100 kg	Nikolay Balboshin; Soviet Union	Refik Memišević; Yugoslavia	Georgi Raykov; Bulgaria
+100 kg	Nikola Dinev; Bulgaria	Aleksandr Kolchinsky; Soviet Union	Arne Robertsson; Sweden
