= Wrestling at the 1973 Summer Universiade =

Wrestling at the VII Summer Universiade
- Venue: University Ring
- Dates: August 1973

The Wrestling competition in the 1973 Summer Universiade were held in Moscow, Soviet Union. It was added as an optional sports by the host country, Soviet Union.

== Medal table ==
Rank	Nation	Gold	Silver	Bronze	Total
1	Soviet Union	15	2	2	19
2	Japan	3	0	0	3
3	Romania	1	5	3	9
4	Mongolia	1	0	1	2
5	Bulgaria	0	4	5	9
6	Iran	0	4	0	4
7	United States	0	2	4	6
8	Hungary	0	2	0	2
9	Yugoslavia	0	1	2	3
10	East Germany	0	0	2	2
11	India	0	0	1	1
Totals (11 entries)		20	20	20	60

== Medal summary ==
=== Greco-Roman ===
Event	Gold	Silver	Bronze
48 kg	Gheorghe Berceanu (ROU)	Aleksey Shumakov (URS)	Kiril Skatchkov (BUL)
52 kg	Valentin Kluchnikov (URS)	Nicu Gingă (ROU)	James Jones (USA)
57 kg	Edvard Feinstein (URS)	Gyula Molnár (HUN)	Bill Davids (USA)
62 kg	Jemal Megrelishvili (URS)	Ion Păun (ROU)	Roland Werner (GDR)
68 kg	Shamil Khisamutdinov (URS)	Konstantin Trajkov (BUL)	Juergen Haenel (GDR)
74 kg	Gennady Korban (URS)	Jozsef Hornyak (HUN)	Nojislav Tabacki (YUG)
82 kg	Leonid Liberman (URS)	Stahikus Olteanu (ROU)	Mile Zvidzak (YUG)
90 kg	Estas Goglizhidze (URS)	Darko Nišavić (YUG)	Nicolae Neguț (ROU)
100 kg	Mikheil Saladze (URS)	Ivan Tsolov (BUL)	Ken Levels (USA)
+100 kg	Shota Morshiladse (URS)	Petar Stanchev (BUL)	Victor Dolipschi (ROU)

=== Freestyle ===
Event	Gold	Silver	Bronze
48 kg	Rafik Gadzhiev (URS)	Chitaragan Khozeyr (IRI)	Noroute Sambadi (IND)
52 kg	Katsuhiro Shimoda (JPN)	Ghadir Nokhodchi (IRI)	Jamsram Monchichor (MGL)
57 kg	Tadashi Sasaki (JPN)	Mohsen Farahvashi (IRI)	Prokopi Shestakov (URS)
62 kg	Akira Miyahara (JPN)	Mohammad Reza Navaei (IRI)	Yuri Korolyov (URS)
68 kg	Tsedendambyn Natsagdorj (MGL)	Pavel Pinigin (URS)	Richard Levinguer (USA)
74 kg	Aleksander Airapetyan (URS)	Christo Stavrev (BUL)	Cristian Emilian (ROU)
82 kg	Vasili Sulyin (URS)	Vasile Iorga (ROU)	Petko Zaberski (BUL)
90 kg	Levan Tediashvili (URS)	Floyd Chitchkok (USA)	Enju Stoichev (BUL)
100 kg	Ivan Yarygin (URS)	Burke Deadrich (USA)	Dimitar Stankov (BUL)
+100 kg	Nodar Modebadse (URS)	Ladislau Șimon (ROU)	Neno Ihotov (BUL)
