= Jan Wypiorczyk =

Polish wrestler

Jan Wypiorczyk (22 January 1947 – 8 November 2011) was a Polish wrestler who competed in the 1968 Summer Olympics and in the 1972 Summer Olympics. He was born in Łódź.
