= Zagalav Abdulbekov =

Russian freestyle wrestler

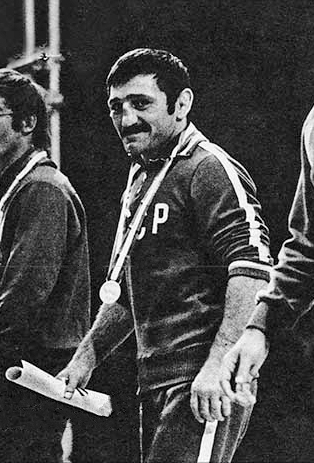
- Abdulbekov at the 1973 World Championships

Personal information
- Born: 19 December 1945 (age 80) Karata, Dagestan, Soviet Union
- Height: 160 cm (5 ft 3 in)

Sport
- Sport: Freestyle wrestling
- Club: Dynamo Makhachkala
Medal record
Men's freestyle wrestling
Representing the Soviet Union
Olympic Games
Gold medal – first place	1972 Munich	62 kg
World Championships
Gold medal – first place	1971 Sofia	62 kg
Gold medal – first place	1973 Tehran	62 kg
Bronze medal – third place	1969 Mar del Plata	62 kg
European Championships
Silver medal – second place	1973 Lausanne	62 kg
Bronze medal – third place	1969 Sofia	62 kg
Bronze medal – third place	1975 Ludwigshafen	62 kg

Zagalav Abdulbekovich Abdulbekov (Russian: Загалав Абдулбекович Абдулбеков; born 19 December 1945) is a retired Russian featherweight freestyle wrestler of Avar heritage. He won the world title in 1971 and 1973 and an Olympic gold medal in 1972. At the European Championships, he earned a silver in 1973 and a bronze in 1969 and 1975.

Adbulbekov took up wrestling in 1961 and later won four Soviet titles, in 1966, 1968, 1969 and 1973. After retiring from competitions he worked as a wrestling coach, and headed the Soviet freestyle team in 1974–80.
