= John Peterson (wrestler) =

American wrestler (born 1948)

Personal information
- Born: October 22, 1948 (age 77) Cumberland, Wisconsin, U.S.
Medal record
Men's freestyle wrestling
Representing the United States
Olympic Games
Gold medal – first place	1976 Montreal	82 kg
Silver medal – second place	1972 Munich	82 kg
World Championships
Silver medal – second place	1979 San Diego	82 kg
Bronze medal – third place	1978 Mexico City	82 kg

John Allan Peterson (born October 22, 1948) is an American former wrestler and Olympic champion in freestyle wrestling.

== Wrestling career ==
Peterson grew up in Comstock, Wisconsin, attending nearby Cumberland High School before graduating from the University of Wisconsin-Stout in 1971.

He placed fifth at the 1971 NAIA Men's Wrestling Championships as a collegiate wrestler in the 167 pound weight class. Peterson competed in freestyle wrestling at the 1972 Olympics, earning a silver medal in the 82 kg weight class. At the 1976 Summer Olympics, he won the gold medal at 82 kg. Peterson's younger brother, Ben Peterson, also competed in both the 1972 and 1976 Summer Olympics as a freestyle wrestler, winning a gold medal in 1972 and silver medal in 1976.

In 1986, Peterson was inducted into the National Wrestling Hall of Fame as a Distinguished Member.
