= Levan Tediashvili =

Soviet-Georgian former wrestler (1948–2024)

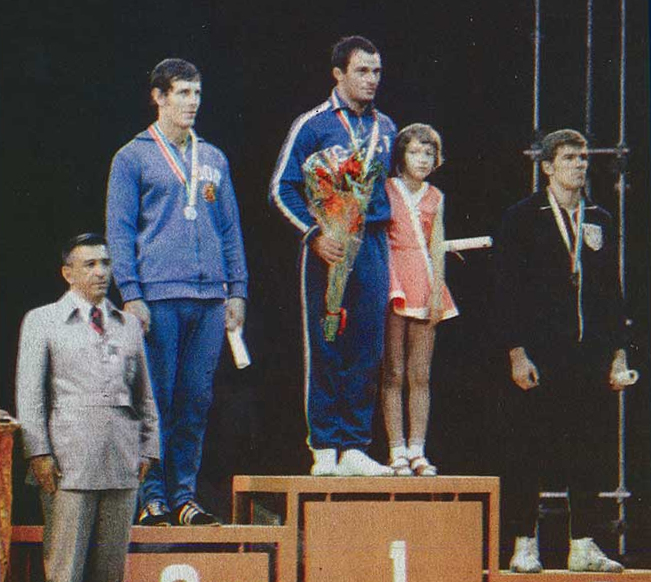
- Levan Tediashvili (center) with Horst Stottmeister and Ben Peterson at the 1973 World Wrestling Championships in Tehran

Personal information
- Born: 15 March 1948 Sagarejo, Georgian SSR, USSR
- Died: 17 February 2024 (aged 75)
- Height: 1.86 m (6 ft 1 in)
- Weight: 90 kg (198 lb)

Sport
- Sport: Freestyle wrestling
- Club: Gantiadi (1968–1974), Lokomotiv (1975–1977), Dynamo (1980)
Medal record
Men's freestyle wrestling
Representing Soviet Union
Olympic Games
Gold medal – first place	1972 Munich	82 kg
Gold medal – first place	1976 Montreal	90 kg
World Championships
Gold medal – first place	1971 Sofia	82 kg
Gold medal – first place	1973 Tehran	90 kg
Gold medal – first place	1974 Istanbul	90 kg
Gold medal – first place	1975 Minsk	90 kg
Silver medal – second place	1978 Mexico City	100 kg
World Cup
Gold medal – first place	1973 Toledo	90 kg
Summer Universiade
Gold medal – first place	1973 Moscow	90 kg

Levan Tediashvili (Georgian: ლევან თედიაშვილი; 15 March 1948 – 17 February 2024) was a Soviet and Georgian wrestler and Olympic champion in Freestyle wrestling in 1972 and 1976. He remained undefeated between 1971 and 1976. Besides freestyle wrestling, he was also a Soviet and world champion in sambo.

== Olympics ==
Tediashvili won gold medal at the 1972 Summer Olympics in the middleweight class. At the 1976 Summer Olympics he received gold medal in the light heavyweight class. While winning these titles, he defeated two brothers, John Peterson in 1972 and Ben Peterson in 1976. John won a gold medal in 1976 and Ben won a gold medal in 1972, in the weight categories where Tediashvili did not compete.

== World and European championships ==
Tediashvili won a gold medal in the 82 kg class at the 1971 FILA Wrestling World Championships, and gold medals in the 90 kg class in 1973, 1974 and 1975. At the 1978 FILA Wrestling World Championships he received a silver medal in the 100 kg class. He also won European titles in 1974, 1976 and 1978.

== Biography and awards ==
Tediashvili was born to a Georgian father, invalid of World War II, and a Russian mother, who moved to Georgia with her other son Herman after her husband was killed in World War II. Herman also became wrestler and then worked as wrestling coach in Chișinău.

Tediashvili was selected among the Soviet Union top ten athletes of the year in 1973 by the Federation of Sports Journalists of the USSR. In 1976, he was awarded the Order of Lenin.

In 1987, he and Georgian Olympic cyclist Omar Pkhakadze played two heroes in the historical Georgian film Khareba da Gogia. The film director Georgiy Shengelaya chose them instead of professional actors for their athleticism, charisma and energy required for these roles; their assistants in the film were also played by sportsmen, world champions in wrestling.

Tediashvili fought in the Abkhazian War, along with his son, who was killed in the conflict. From 1995 to 2003, he was a parliamentary deputy from a district of Kakheti.

In 2021, Tediashvili played the starring role of a former wrestling champion in Levan Koguashvili's feature film Brighton 4th, for which he was awarded Best Actor at the 2021 Tribeca Film Festival, and Outstanding Individual Performance at FilmFestival Cottbus 2021.

Tediashvili died on 17 February 2024, at the age of 75.
