= Peter Neumair =

German wrestler (born 1950)

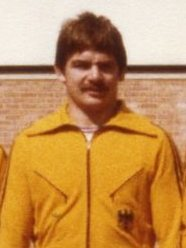
Peter Neumair in 1978

Peter Neumair (born 9 October 1950 in Freising) is a German former wrestler who competed in the 1972 Summer Olympics and in the 1976 Summer Olympics.
