= Hayri Polat =

Turkish wrestler

Hayri Polat (4 April 1948 – 4 November 2013) was a Turkish wrestler who competed in the 1972 Summer Olympics.

== Biography ==
Polat was born in Elmalı village of Çorum in 1948. He was part of Kardemir Karabükspor. He won a silver medal in the European Championship held in Switzerland in 1973. He became fourth in the World Championship held in Istanbul, Turkey, in 1974, and fifth in the World Championship held in the Soviet Union in 1975.

Polat died in Antalya on 4 November 2013 and was buried in Karabük.
