= Kurt Elmgren =

Swedish wrestler (born 1943)

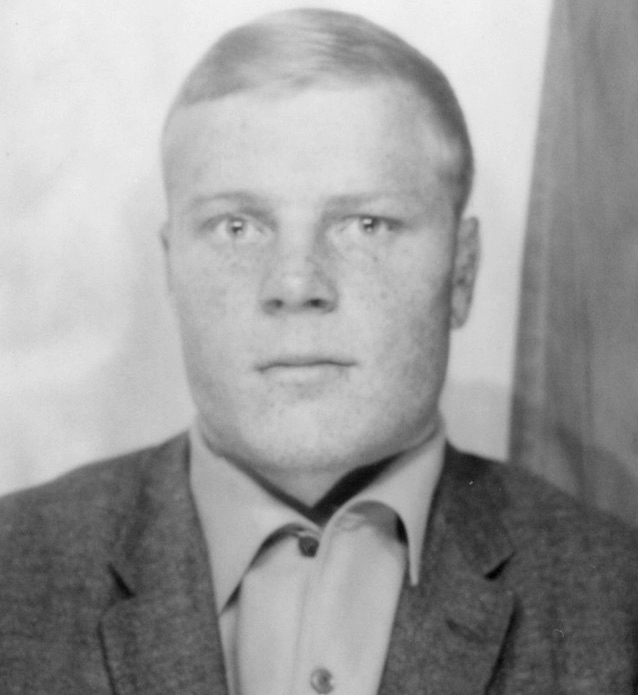

Personal information
- Full name: Kurt-Benny Christer Elmgren
- Born: 31 August 1943 (age 81); Hovmantorp, Sweden
- Height: 178 cm (5 ft 10 in)
- Weight: 82 kg (181 lb)

Sport
- Country: Sweden
- Sport: Amateur wrestling
- Club: BK Enig

Kurt-Benny Christer Elmgren (born 31 August 1943) is a retired Swedish freestyle wrestler. He placed fifth in the 78 kg weight division at the 1966 European Championships, and competed in the 82 kg weight division at the 1972 Summer Olympics. He won the Nordic championships in 1975 and 1976 and was the national wrestling champions from 1969 to 1976.
