= Jan Karlsson (wrestler) =

Swedish wrestler (born 1945)

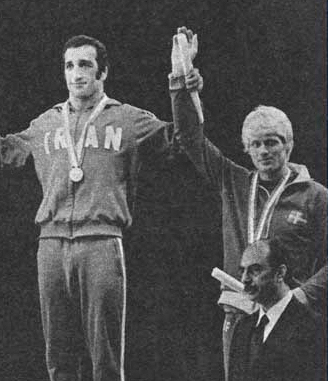
- Karlsson (right) at the 1973 World Championships

Personal information
- Born: 15 November 1945 (age 80) Trollhättan, Sweden
- Height: 183 cm (6 ft 0 in)

Sport
- Sport: Wrestling
- Events: Greco-Roman, freestyle
- Club: Trollhättans Atletklubb
Medal record
Representing Sweden
Olympic Games
Bronze medal – third place	1972 Munich	74 kg, Greco-Roman
Silver medal – second place	1972 Munich	74 kg, freestyle
World Championships
Silver medal – second place	1973 Tehran	74 kg, Greco-Roman
Bronze medal – third place	1973 Tehran	74 kg, freestyle
European Championships
Silver medal – second place	1967 Istanbul	74 kg, Greco-Roman
Bronze medal – third place	1968 Skopje	70 kg, Greco-Roman
Bronze medal – third place	1969 Modena	74 kg, freestyle
Silver medal – second place	1970 Berlin	74 kg, Greco-Roman
Gold medal – first place	1975 Ludwigshafen	74 kg, Greco-Roman

Jan Egon Karlsson (born 15 November 1945) is a retired Swedish wrestler, who often competed both in Greco-Roman and freestyle divisions at the same championships. In this way he won two medals each at the 1972 Olympic Games and 1973 World Senior Championships. He remains the last wrestler to win a medal in both styles in the same Olympic Games.
