= Soslan Andiyev =

Russian freestyle wrestler

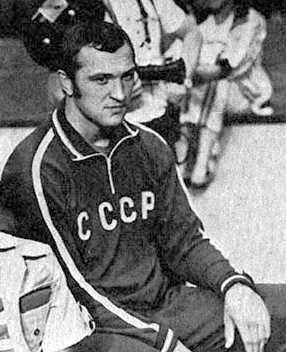
- Andiyev at the 1978 World Championships

Personal information
- Born: 21 April 1952 Ordzhonikidze, Russian SFSR, Soviet Union
- Died: 22 November 2018 (aged 66)
- Height: 194 cm (6 ft 4 in)
- Weight: 125 kg (276 lb)

Sport
- Sport: Freestyle wrestling
- Club: Dynamo Vladikavkaz
- Coached by: Aslan Dzgoyew; Genady Andiyev (brother)
Medal record
Representing Soviet Union
Olympic Games
| Gold medal – first place | 1976 Montreal | +100 kg |
| Gold medal – first place | 1980 Moscow | +100 kg |
World Championships
| Gold medal – first place | 1973 Tehran | +100 kg |
| Gold medal – first place | 1975 Minsk | +100 kg |
| Gold medal – first place | 1977 Lausanne | +100 kg |
| Gold medal – first place | 1978 Mexico City | +100 kg |
| Silver medal – second place | 1974 Istanbul | +100 kg |
World Cup
| Gold medal – first place | 1973 Toledo | +100 kg |
European Championships
| Gold medal – first place | 1974 Madrid | +100 kg |
| Gold medal – first place | 1975 Ludwigshafen | +100 kg |
| Gold medal – first place | 1982 Varna | +100 kg |

Soslan Petrovich Andiyev (Ossetian: Андиаты Пётры фырт Сослан, Russian: Сослан Петрович Андиев, 21 April 1952 – 22 November 2018) was a Soviet heavyweight freestyle wrestler. He was an Olympic champion in 1976 and 1980, world champion in 1973, 1975, 1977 and 1978, European champion in 1974, 1975 and 1982, and Soviet champion in 1973–78 and 1980. He won the World Cup in 1976 and 1981, but missed the 1984 Olympics due to their boycott by the Soviet Union and retired the same year. After that he first worked as a national wrestling coach, but in 1989 returned to his native Ossetia to become a sports functionary. In 1990–98, he served as vice-president of the Russian Olympic Committee. In 2006 he was inducted into the FILA Wrestling Hall of Fame.

Andiyev had one sister, Svetlana, and two brothers, Genady and Sergey; both were leading Soviet heavyweight freestyle wrestlers. Their mother was Russian and father was Ossetian. The senior male Andiyev was 2.18 m tall and weighed 136 kg, and was a regional wrestling champion; he died when Soslan was eight years old. Genady, at 18 years old, was the eldest sibling at the time; he became head of the family and later coached Soslan. Four years later, in 1964, he brought Soslan to the wrestling club, to continue the family tradition. In 1971 Genady, Sergey and Soslan placed first, second and third, respectively, at the Russian championships.

In 1974 Andiyev graduated from the Vladikavkaz Agricultural University and began working on a PhD, but soon abandoned it in favor of wrestling. Between 1975 and 1989 he worked as a sports instructor for the Ossetian Police, which allowed him to train and compete. After retiring from competitions, between 1985 and 1989 he worked as a national wrestling coach. In 1989 he returned to Ossetia to assume the post of the Ossetian Minister of Sport. Andiyev was married with three daughters, Zarina (b. 1978), Mariya (b. 1980) and Lina (b. 1985) and son Georgy (b. 1992).
