= 1975 World Wrestling Championships =

- Host city: Minsk, Soviet Union
- Dates: 11–18 September 1975
- Stadium: Minsk Sports Palace

Champions
- Freestyle: Soviet Union
- Greco-Roman: Soviet Union

The 1975 World Wrestling Championships were held Minsk, Soviet Union (present-day Belarus) at Minsk Sports Palace. Greco-Roman wrestling competition was held 11–14 September, while freestyle wrestlers competed 15–18 September.

== Medal table ==
Rank	Nation	Gold	Silver	Bronze	Total
1	Soviet Union	12	4	1	17
2	Bulgaria	3	3	6	12
3	Mongolia	2	1	0	3
4	Japan	2	0	1	3
5	West Germany	1	0	2	3
6	East Germany	0	4	0	4
7	Poland	0	3	2	5
8	Romania	0	2	2	4
9	France	0	1	0	1
9	Iran	0	1	0	1
9	Turkey	0	1	0	1
12	South Korea	0	0	3	3
13	Hungary	0	0	2	2
14	Finland	0	0	1	1
Totals (14 entries)		20	20	20	60

== Team ranking ==
Rank	Men's freestyle		Men's Greco-Roman	
Rank	Team	Points	Team	Points
1	Soviet Union	43	Soviet Union	56
2	Bulgaria	31	Bulgaria	34
3	Japan	20	Poland	26
4	Mongolia	19	Romania	20
5	United States	17	Hungary	18
6	East Germany	16	East Germany	10

== Medal summary ==
=== Freestyle ===
Event	Gold	Silver	Bronze
48 kg	Hasan Isaev; Bulgaria	Anatoly Kharitonyuk; Soviet Union	Kim Hwa-kyung; South Korea
52 kg	Yuji Takada; Japan	Telman Pashayev; Soviet Union	Dimitar Filipov; Bulgaria
57 kg	Masao Arai; Japan	Vladimir Yumin; Soviet Union	Miho Dukov; Bulgaria
62 kg	Zevegiin Oidov; Mongolia	Théodule Toulotte; France	Yang Jung-mo; South Korea
68 kg	Pavel Pinigin; Soviet Union	Tsedendambyn Natsagdorj; Mongolia	Ismail Yuseinov; Bulgaria
74 kg	Ruslan Ashuraliev; Soviet Union	Mansour Barzegar; Iran	Jiichiro Date; Japan
82 kg	Adolf Seger; West Germany	Ismail Abilov; Bulgaria	Vasile Iorga; Romania
90 kg	Levan Tediashvili; Soviet Union	Horst Stottmeister; East Germany	Shukri Ahmedov; Bulgaria
100 kg	Khorloogiin Bayanmönkh; Mongolia	Harald Büttner; East Germany	Vladimir Gulyutkin; Soviet Union
+100 kg	Soslan Andiyev; Soviet Union	Roland Gehrke; East Germany	Heinz Eichelbaum; West Germany

=== Greco-Roman ===
Event	Gold	Silver	Bronze
48 kg	Vladimir Zubkov; Soviet Union	Gheorghe Berceanu; Romania	Stefan Angelov; Bulgaria
52 kg	Vitaly Konstantinov; Soviet Union	Bilal Tabur; Turkey	Baek Seung-hyun; South Korea
57 kg	Farhat Mustafin; Soviet Union	Józef Lipień; Poland	Pertti Ukkola; Finland
62 kg	Nelson Davidyan; Soviet Union	Kazimierz Lipień; Poland	László Réczi; Hungary
68 kg	Shamil Khisamutdinov; Soviet Union	Andrzej Supron; Poland	Binyo Chifudov; Bulgaria
74 kg	Anatoly Bykov; Soviet Union	Yanko Shopov; Bulgaria	Mihály Toma; Hungary
82 kg	Anatoly Nazarenko; Soviet Union	Ion Enache; Romania	Adam Ostrowski; Poland
90 kg	Valery Rezantsev; Soviet Union	Stoyan Nikolov; Bulgaria	Fred Theobald; West Germany
100 kg	Kamen Goranov; Bulgaria	Fredi Albrecht; East Germany	Andrzej Skrzydlewski; Poland
+100 kg	Aleksandar Tomov; Bulgaria	Aleksandr Kolchinsky; Soviet Union	Roman Codreanu; Romania
