= Ruslan Ashuraliev =

Russian freestyle wrestler

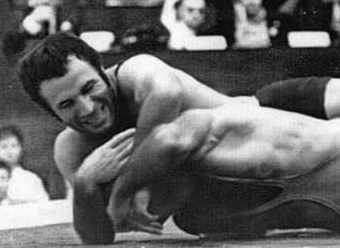
- Ashuraliev at the 1975 World Championships

Personal information
- Born: 20 February 1950 Makhachkala, Russian SFSR, Soviet Union
- Died: 27 November 2009 (aged 59) Makhachkala, Russia
- Height: 174 cm (5 ft 9 in)

Sport
- Sport: Freestyle wrestling
- Club: Urozhai Mashachkala
- Coached by: Sultan Musayev, Ali Aliyev
Medal record
Representing the Soviet Union
Olympic Games
Bronze medal – third place	1972 Munich	68 kg
World Championships
Gold medal – first place	1974 Istanbul	74 kg
Gold medal – first place	1975 Minsk	74 kg
Silver medal – second place	1973 Tehran	74 kg
European championships
Gold medal – first place	1974 Madrid	74 kg

Ruslan Nuraliyevich Ashuraliev (Russian: Руслан Нуралиевич Ашуралиев, 20 February 1950 – 27 November 2009) was a Russian freestyle wrestler who won world titles in 1974 and 1975 and placed second in 1973. He competed at the 1972 and 1976 Olympics and finished third and fourth, respectively.

Ashuraliev took up wrestling in 1965 and later won five Soviet titles, in 1971, 1973–74 and 1976–77. After retiring from competitions he worked as a wrestling coach, and also served two terms in the parliament of Dagestan. From 2000 until his death in 2009, he headed the Dagestan Polytechnic Institute in Makhachkala.
