= Sreten Damjanović =

Serbian Greco-Roman wrestler (born 1946)

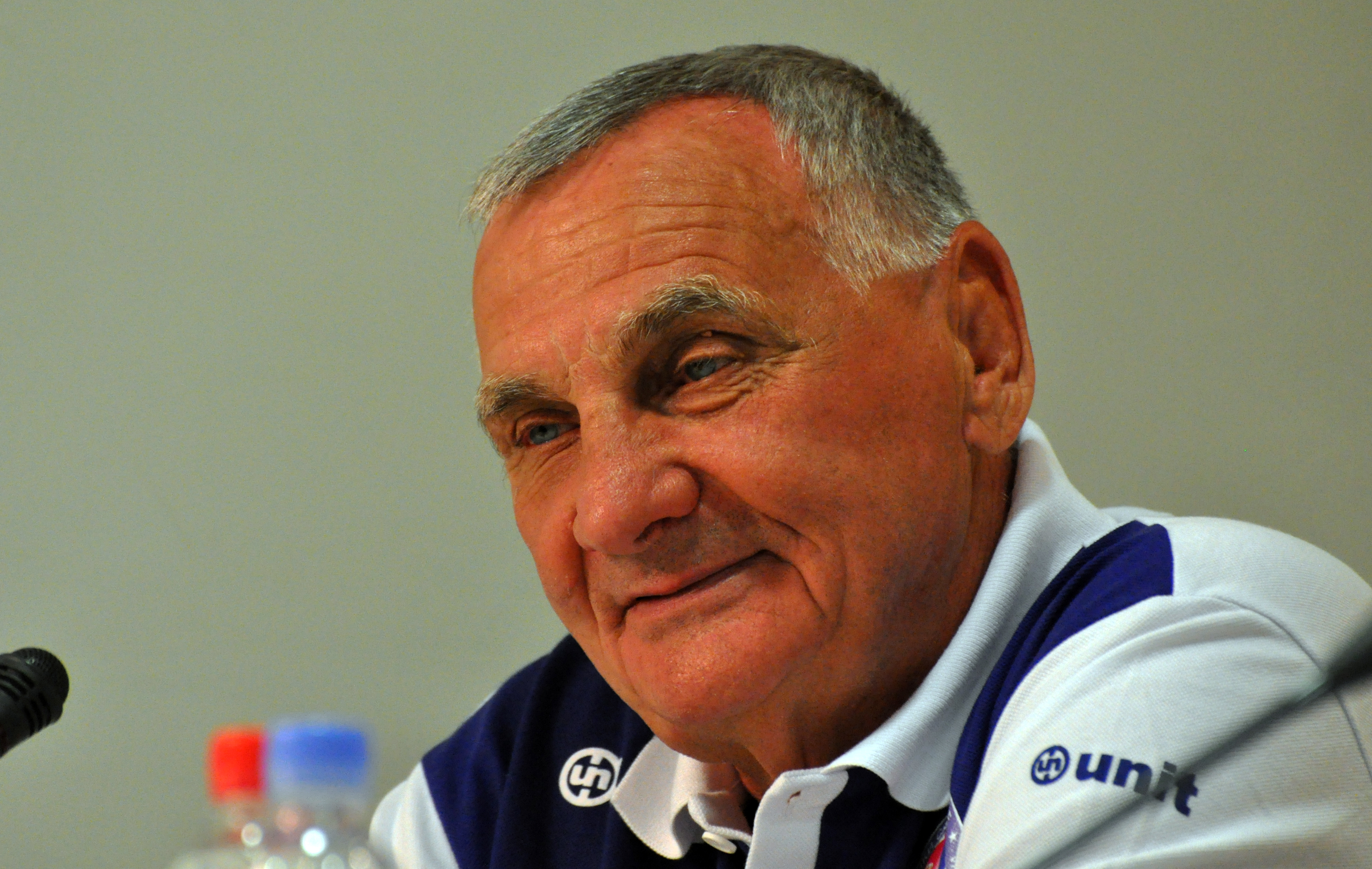

Personal information
- Born: 10 October 1946 (age 79) Belgrade, Yugoslavia
- Height: 171 cm (5 ft 7 in)

Sport
- Sport: Greco-Roman wrestling
- Events: RK Spartak, Subotica
Medal record
Representing Yugoslavia
World Championships
| Silver medal – second place | 1969 Mar del Plata | -68 kg |
| Gold medal – first place | 1971 Sofia | -68 kg |
| Silver medal – second place | 1973 Tehran | -68 kg |
European Championships
| Gold medal – first place | 1969 Modena | -68 kg |
| Silver medal – second place | 1970 Berlin | -68 kg |
| Bronze medal – third place | 1973 Helsinki | -68 kg |
Mediterranean Games
| Silver medal – second place | 1967 Tunis | -63 kg |
| Gold medal – first place | 1971 Izmir | -68 kg |

Sreten Damjanović (born 10 October 1946) is a retired lightweight Greco-Roman wrestler from Serbia. He won the world title in 1971 and placed second in 1969 and 1973. He also competed at the 1968 and 1972 Summer Olympics. In 1971, he received the Golden Badge as Yugoslav athlete of the year.

Awards
| Preceded by Desanka Pešut | (Socialist Federal Republic of Yugoslavia) The Best Athlete of Yugoslavia; 1971 | Succeeded by Mate Parlov |
