= Ladislau Șimon =

Romanian freestyle wrestler

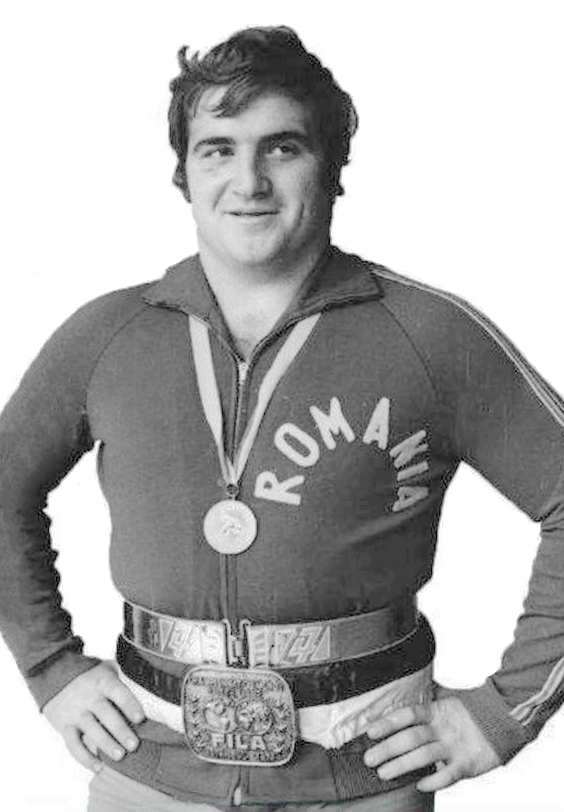

Personal information
- Born: 25 September 1951 Târgu Mureș, Romania
- Died: 12 May 2005 (aged 53)
- Height: 183 cm (6 ft 0 in)
- Weight: 114 kg (251 lb)

Sport
- Sport: Freestyle wrestling
- Club: Mures
Medal record
Representing Romania
Olympic Games
Bronze medal – third place	1976 Montreal	+100 kg
World Championships
Gold medal – first place	1974 Istanbul	+100 kg
Bronze medal – third place	1973 Tehran	+100 kg
European Championships
Gold medal – first place	1976 Leningrad	+100 kg
Silver medal – second place	1974 Madrid	+100 kg
Bronze medal – third place	1975 Ludwigshafen	+100 kg
Summer Universiade
Silver medal – second place	1973 Moscow	+100 kg
Bronze medal – third place	1977 Sofia	+100 kg

Ladislau Simon (Hungarian: Simon László, 25 September 1951 – 12 May 2005) was a super-heavyweight freestyle wrestler from Romania. He won a bronze medal at the 1976 Olympics, as well as the world title in 1974 and European title in 1976. After retiring from competitions he worked as a national wrestling coach.
