= Nicu Gingă =

Romanian Greco-Roman wrestler

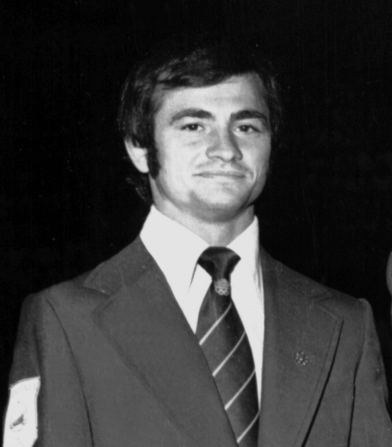

Personal information
- Born: 10 March 1953 (age 73) Timiș County, Romania
- Height: 158 cm (5 ft 2 in)

Sport
- Sport: Greco-Roman wrestling
- Club: Rapid București; CS Dinamo București
- Coached by: Marian Belusica
Medal record
Representing Romania
Olympic Games
Silver medal – second place	1976 Montreal	-52 kg
World Championships
Gold medal – first place	1973 Tehran	-52 kg
Bronze medal – third place	1974 Katowice	-52 kg
Gold medal – first place	1977 Gotheburg	-52 kg
Silver medal – second place	1978 Mexico City	-52 kg
European Championships
Bronze medal – third place	1974 Madrid	-52 kg
Silver medal – second place	1977 Bursa	-52 kg
Bronze medal – third place	1978 Sofia	-52 kg
Silver medal – second place	1979 Bucharest	-52 kg
Summer Universiade
Silver medal – second place	1973 Moscow	-52kg
Silver medal – second place	1977 Sofia	-52kg
Silver medal – second place	1981 Bucharest	-52kg

Nicu Gingă (born 10 March 1953) is a retired flyweight Greco-Roman wrestler from Romania. He competed at the 1976 and 1980 Olympics and finished second and fourth, respectively. He won the world title in 1973 and 1977, placing second in 1978 and third in 1974.
