= Ivan Iliev (wrestler) =

Bulgarian wrestler

Personal information
- Born: December 28, 1946 (age 79) Batin, Ruse Municipality, Bulgaria
- Died: June 27, 2000; 26 years ago Sofia
Medal record
Men's Freestyle Wrestling
Representing Bulgaria
World Championships
Gold medal – first place	1969 Mar del PLata	82 kg
European Championships
Silver medal – second place	1970 Berlin	82 kg
Silver medal – second place	1972 Katowice	82 kg
Bronze medal – third place	1969 Sofia	82 kg

Ivan Iliev (Bulgarian: Иван Илиев; born 28 December 1946 in Batin, Ruse, Bulgaria) is a Bulgarian Freestyle wrestler who competed in the 1972 Summer Olympics.

Iliev had the following finishes at major championships:

- Gold medal 1969 World Championship - Mar del Plata: 82.0 kg. Freestyle (1st);

- Bronze medal 1969 European Championship - Sofia: 82.0 kg. Freestyle (3rd);

- Silver medal 1970 European Championship - Berlin: 82.0 kg. Freestyle (2nd);

- Silver medal 1972 European Championship - Katowice: 82.0 kg. Freestyle (2nd).

== Awards ==
In 1972 he was awarded “The Golden Belt – Dan Kolov".
