= Shamil Khisamutdinov =

Russian wrestler

Personal information
- Born: 20 September 1950 (age 76) Uzlovaya, Tula Oblast, Soviet Union

Sport
- Sport: Greco-Roman wrestling
Medal record
Representing Soviet Union
Olympic Games
Gold medal – first place	1972 Munich	Lightweight
World Championships
Gold medal – first place	1973 Tehran	Lightweight
Gold medal – first place	1975 Minsk	Lightweight
Summer Universiade
Gold medal – first place	1973 Moscow	Lightweight

Shamil Khisamutdinov (Tatar: Шамил Хисаметдинев, born 20 September 1950) is a Russian wrestler. He won an Olympic gold medal in Greco-Roman wrestling in 1972, competing for the Soviet Union. He won gold medals at the 1973 and 1975 World Wrestling Championships. He was affiliated with Spartak Moscow.
