= Arsen Alakhverdiev =

Russian freestyle wrestler

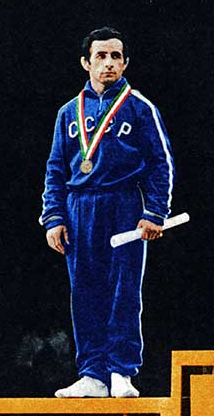
- Alakhverdiev at the 1973 World Championships

Personal information
- Born: 24 January 1949 (age 77) Magaramkent, Dagestan, Russian SFSR, Soviet Union
- Height: 154 cm (5 ft 1 in)

Sport
- Sport: Freestyle wrestling
- Club: Burevestnik Makhachkala; SKA Makhachkala
- Coached by: Armenak Karapetyan
Medal record
Representing the Soviet Union
Olympic Games
Silver medal – second place	1972 Munich	-52 kg
World Championships
Silver medal – second place	1973 Tehran	-52 kg
World Cup
Gold medal – first place	1973 Toledo	-52 kg
European Championships
Gold medal – first place	1972 Katowice	-52 kg
Gold medal – first place	1973 Lausanne	-52 kg
Gold medal – first place	1975 Ludwigshafen	-52 kg
Silver medal – second place	1976 Leningrad	-52 kg

Arsen Shakhlamazovich Alakhverdiev (Russian: Арсен Шахламазович Алахвердиев, born 24 January 1949) is a retired Russian flyweight freestyle wrestler who won silver medals at the 1972 Olympics and 1973 World Championships. He held the European title in 1972, 1973 and 1975 and the World Cup in 1973. Domestically, Alakhverdiev won the Soviet title in 1975, placing second in 1972, 1974, 1976 and 1977 and third in 1971.

Alakhverdiev was born in a remote village and took up wrestling in September 1964 when he began his studies in the regional capital, Makhachkala. He was motivated by example of the Dagestani wrestler Ali Aliyev. Alakhverdiev then knew little about technique, but was well trained, and could do one-handed pull-ups. He retired at the age of 30, and then worked for one year as an engineer, before returning to wrestling as a coach. His son Velikhan also became a wrestler and won medals at the European championships.
