= Kazimierz Lipień =

Polish Greco-Roman wrestler (1949–2005)

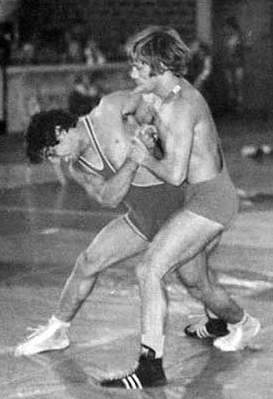
- Lipień (right) in 1976

Personal information
- Born: 6 February 1949 Jaczków, Poland
- Died: 12 November 2005 (aged 56) New York City, U.S.
- Height: 164 cm (5 ft 5 in)

Sport
- Sport: Greco-Roman wrestling
- Club: MKS Jelenia Góra; Wisłoki Dębica
- Coached by: Czeslaw Korzen (personal); Janusz Tracewski (national)
Medal record
Men's Greco-Roman wrestling
Representing Poland
Olympic Games
Gold medal – first place	1976 Montreal	62 kg
Bronze medal – third place	1972 Munich	62 kg
World Championships
Gold medal – first place	1973 Tehran	62 kg
Gold medal – first place	1974 Katowice	62 kg
Silver medal – second place	1971 Sofia	62 kg
Silver medal – second place	1975 Minsk	62 kg
Silver medal – second place	1977 Goteborg	62 kg
Silver medal – second place	1978 Mexico City	62 kg
European Championships
Gold medal – first place	1975 Ludwigshafen	62 kg
Gold medal – first place	1977 Leningrad	62 kg
Gold medal – first place	1978 Sofia	62 kg
Silver medal – second place	1972 Katowice	62 kg
Silver medal – second place	1973 Helsinki	62 kg
Bronze medal – third place	1979 Bucharest	62 kg

Kazimierz Lipień (6 February 1949 – 12 November 2005) was a Polish featherweight Greco-Roman wrestler. He competed at the 1972, 1976 and 1980 Olympics and placed third, first and sixth, respectively. Between 1971 and 1979 he collected 12 medals at the world and European championships, including five gold medals. His twin brother Józef was also an Olympic Greco-Roman wrestler.

Lipień was born in a large family, and besides Józef had four brothers, Edward, Stanisław, Bogdan and Zbigniew, and two sisters, Ewa and Michalina. He graduated from a technical school in 1972, and in 1980 received a coaching degree in Warsaw. In 1981 he moved to Sweden, where he won three national titles (in 1981 and 1985 in Greco-Roman and in 1982 in freestyle wrestling) and trained wrestlers at various clubs for ten years. In 1991 he returned to Poland and headed the national junior wrestling team. He died in the United States. He had a wife (Antonina) and two sons, Peter and Jacob.
