= Horst Stottmeister =

German freestyle wrestler (born 1948)

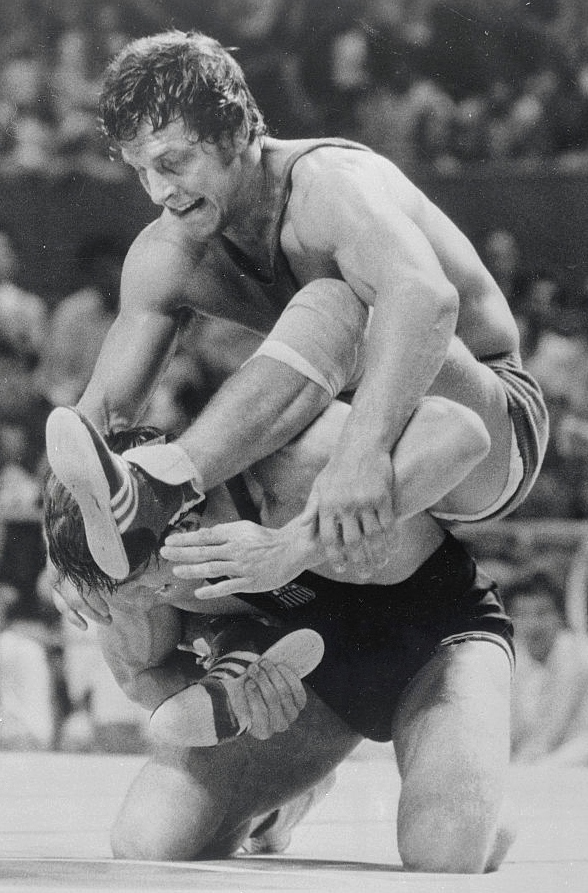
- Stottmeister (top) at the 1976 Olympics

Personal information
- Born: 7 January 1948 (age 78) Stendal, Germany
- Height: 182 cm (6 ft 0 in)

Sport
- Sport: Freestyle wrestling
- Club: SC Leipzig
Medal record
Representing East Germany
World Wrestling Championships
Silver medal – second place	1971 Sofia	-82 kg
Silver medal – second place	1973 Tehran	-90 kg
Silver medal – second place	1975 Minsk	-90 kg
European Wrestling Championships
Gold medal – first place	1970 Berlin	-82 kg
Silver medal – second place	1973 Lausanne	-90 kg
Bronze medal – third place	1974 Madrid	-90 kg
Gold medal – first place	1975 Ludwigshafen	-90 kg

Horst Stottmeister (born 7 January 1948) is a German retired freestyle wrestler. He was a European champion in 1970 and 1975 and won three silver medals at the world championships in 1971–1975. He placed fourth at the 1972 and 1976 Summer Olympics.
