= Aleksandar Tomov (wrestler) =

Bulgarian Greco-Roman wrestler

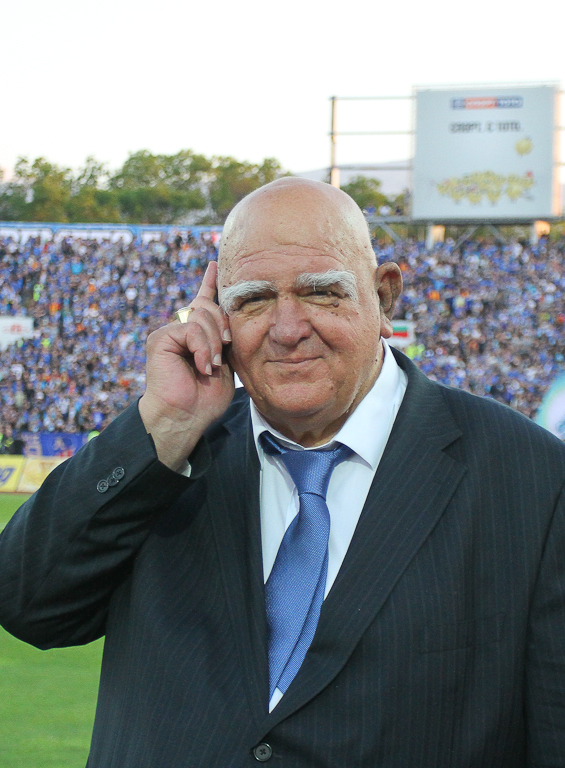
- Tomov in 2014

Personal information
- Born: 3 April 1949 (age 77) Sandanski, Bulgaria

Sport
- Sport: Greco-Roman wrestling
Medal record
Representing Bulgaria
Olympic Games
Silver medal – second place	1972 Munich	+100 kg
Silver medal – second place	1976 Montreal	+100 kg
Silver medal – second place	1980 Moscow	+100 kg
World Championships
Gold medal – first place	1971 Sofia	+100 kg
Gold medal – first place	1973 Tehran	+100 kg
Gold medal – first place	1974 Istanbul	+100 kg
Gold medal – first place	1975 Minsk	+100 kg
Gold medal – first place	1979 San Diego	+100 kg
European Championships
Gold medal – first place	1972 Katowice	+100 kg
Gold medal – first place	1973 Helsinki	+100 kg
Gold medal – first place	1976 Leningrad	+100 kg
Gold medal – first place	1979 Bucarest	+100 kg
Gold medal – first place	1984 Jönköping	+100 kg
Silver medal – second place	1974 Madrid	+100 kg
Silver medal – second place	1978 Oslo	+100 kg
Bronze medal – third place	1970 Berlin	+100 kg
Summer Universiade
Gold medal – first place	1977 Sofia	+100kg

Aleksandar Tomov Lazarov (Bulgarian: Александър Томов Лазаров, born 3 April 1949) is a former Bulgarian Greco-Roman wrestler, in the heavyweight class.

He is in the FILA Hall of Fame as a five-time champion of the World and five-time champion of Europe. He won silver medals at the Olympics in the +100 kg class in 1972, 1976, and 1980.
