= Klaus-Peter Göpfert =

East German wrestler

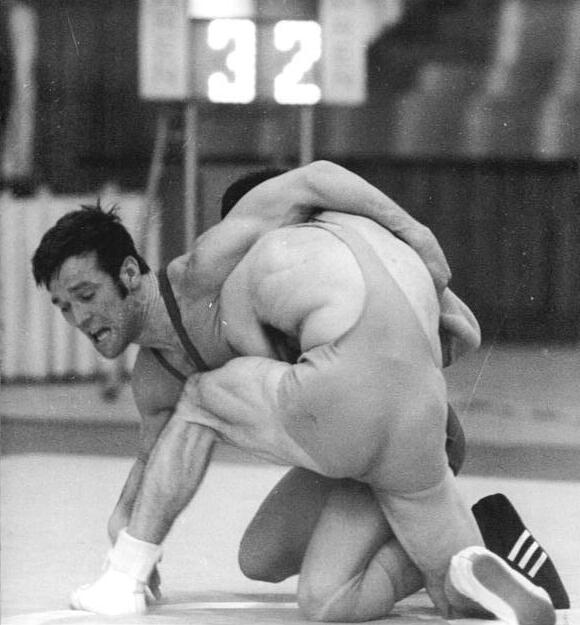
Klaus-Peter Göpfert

Klaus-Peter Göpfert (born 22 October 1948 in Coburg) is a German former Greco-Roman wrestler who competed in the 1972 Summer Olympics and in the 1976 Summer Olympics.
