= Wrestling at the 1984 Summer Olympics – Men's Greco-Roman 57 kg =

Men's Greco-Roman 57 kg at the Games of the XXIII Olympiad
- Venue: Anaheim Convention Center
- Dates: 1–3 August 1984
- Competitors: 16 from 16 nations

Medalists
1st place, gold medalist(s)		Pasquale Passarelli	West Germany
2nd place, silver medalist(s)		Masaki Eto	Japan
3rd place, bronze medalist(s)		Haralambos Holidis	Greece

The Men's Greco-Roman 57 kg at the 1984 Summer Olympics as part of the wrestling program were held at the Anaheim Convention Center, Anaheim, California.

== Tournament results ==
The wrestlers are divided into 2 groups. The winner of each group decided by a double-elimination system.

Legend

- TF — Won by Fall
- ST — Won by Technical Superiority, 12 points difference
- PP — Won by Points, 1-7 points difference, the loser with points
- PO — Won by Points, 1-7 points difference, the loser without points
- SP — Won by Points, 8-11 points difference, the loser with points
- SO — Won by Points, 8-11 points difference, the loser without points
- P0 — Won by Passivity, scoring zero points
- P1 — Won by Passivity, while leading by 1-7 points
- PS — Won by Passivity, while leading by 8-11 points
- DC — Won by Decision, 0–0 score
- PA — Won by Opponent Injury
- DQ — Won by Forfeit
- DNA — Did not appear
- L — Losses
- ER — Round of Elimination
- CP — Classification Points
- TP — Technical Points

=== Eliminatory round ===
==== Group A ====
L		CP	TP		L
Round 1
1	Antonino Caltabiano (ITA)	1-3 PP	1-3	Benni Ljungbeck (SWE)	0
0	Ronny Sigde (NOR)	3-1 PP	10-3	Ilpo Seppälä (FIN)	1
0	Masaki Eto (JPN)	3-1 PP	8-4	Ali Lachkar (MAR)	1
1	Abdel Latif Khalaf (EGY)	0-4 ST	0-14	Haralambos Holidis (GRE)	0
Round 2
1	Antonino Caltabiano (ITA)	3-1 PP	8-2	Ronny Sigde (NOR)	1
0	Benni Ljungbeck (SWE)	3-1 PP	7-1	Ilpo Seppälä (FIN)	2
0	Masaki Eto (JPN)	4-0 ST	16-4	Abdellatif Khalaf (EGY)	2
2	Ali Lachkar (MAR)	0-3 PO	0-2	Haralambos Holidis (GRE)	0
Round 3
2	Antonino Caltabiano (ITA)	0-3 P1	5:44	Masaki Eto (JPN)	0
0	Benni Ljungbeck (SWE)	4-0 TF	5:54	Ronny Sigde (NOR)	2
0	Haralambos Holidis (GRE)			Bye	
Final
	Haralambos Holidis (GRE)	3-1 PP	5-2	Benni Ljungbeck (SWE)	
	Masaki Eto (JPN)	3-1 PP	6-6	Haralambos Holidis (GRE)	
	Benni Ljungbeck (SWE)	0-4 TF	4:25	Masaki Eto (JPN)	

Wrestler	L	ER	CP	Final
Masaki Eto (JPN)	0	-	10	7
Haralambos Holidis (GRE)	0	-	7	4
Benni Ljungbeck (SWE)	0	-	10	1
Antonino Caltabiano (ITA)	2	3	4	
Ronny Sigde (NOR)	2	3	4	
Ilpo Seppälä (FIN)	2	2	2	
Ali Lachkar (MAR)	2	2	1	
Abdellatif Khalaf (EGY)	2	2	0	

==== Group B ====
L		CP	TP		L
Round 1
1	Patrice Mourier (FRA)	1-3 PP	2-8	Nicolae Zamfir (ROM)	0
1	Park Byung-Hyo (KOR)	.5-3.5 SP	4-12	Mehmet Karadağ (TUR)	0
0	Frank Famiano (USA)	4-0 ST	13-0	Servio Severino (DOM)	1
1	Ernesto Bahena (MEX)	0-4 ST	0-13	Pasquale Passarelli (FRG)	0
Round 2
2	Patrice Mourier (FRA)	0-4 TF	5:23	Park Byung-Hyo (KOR)	1
1	Nicolae Zamfir (ROM)	0-3 PO	0-1	Mehmet Karadağ (TUR)	0
0	Frank Famiano (USA)	4-0 ST	17-5	Ernesto Bahena (MEX)	2
2	Sergio Severino (DOM)	0-4 ST	2-16	Pasquale Passarelli (FRG)	0
Round 3
1	Nicolae Zamfir (ROM)	3-1 PP	8-5	Park Byung-Hyo (KOR)	2
1	Mehmet Karadağ (TUR)	0-4 ST	5-18	Frank Famiano (USA)	0
0	Pasquale Passarelli (FRG)			Bye	
Round 4
0	Pasquale Passarelli (FRG)	3.5-0 PS	4:10	Mehmet Karadağ (TUR)	2
1	Nicolae Zamfir (ROM)	3-0 P1	4:30	Frank Famiano (USA)	1
Final
	Niculae Zamfir (ROU)	3-0 P1	4:30	Frank Famiano (USA)	
	Pasquale Passarelli (FRG)	2-0 P0	5:47	Nicolae Zamfir (ROM)	
	Frank Famiano (USA)	0-4 ST	2-14	Pasquale Passarelli (FRG)	

Wrestler	L	ER	CP	Final
Pasquale Passarelli (FRG)	0	-	11.5	6
Nicolae Zamfir (ROM)	1	-	9	3
Frank Famiano (USA)	1	-	12	0
Mehmet Karadağ (TUR)	2	4	6.5	
Park Byung-Hyo (KOR)	2	3	5.5	
Patrice Mourier (FRA)	2	2	1	
Ernesto Bahena (MEX)	2	2	0	
Sergio Severino (DOM)	2	2	0	

=== Final round ===
	CP	TP	
5th place match
Benni Ljungbeck (SWE)	0-4 PA		Frank Famiano (USA)
Bronze medal match
Haralambos Holidis (GRE)	3-1 PP	2-1	Nicolae Zamfir (ROM)
Gold medal match
Masaki Eto (JPN)	1-3 PP	5-8	Pasquale Passarelli (FRG)

== Final standings ==
1. Pasquale Passarelli (FRG)
2. Masaki Eto (JPN)
3. Haralambos Holidis (GRE)
4. Nicolae Zamfir (ROM)
5. Frank Famiano (USA)
6. Benni Ljungbeck (SWE)
7. Mehmet Karadağ (TUR)
8. Park Byung-Hyo (KOR)
