= Wrestling at the 1984 Summer Olympics – Men's Greco-Roman 82 kg =

Men's Greco-Roman 82 kg at the Games of the XXIII Olympiad
- Venue: Anaheim Convention Center
- Dates: 1–3 August 1984
- Competitors: 15 from 15 nations

Medalists
1st place, gold medalist(s)		Ion Draica	Romania
2nd place, silver medalist(s)		Dimitrios Thanopoulos	Greece
3rd place, bronze medalist(s)		Sören Claeson	Sweden

The Men's Greco-Roman 82 kg at the 1984 Summer Olympics as part of the wrestling program were held at the Anaheim Convention Center, Anaheim, California.

== Medalists ==
Gold	Ion Draica; Romania
Silver	Dimitrios Thanopoulos; Greece
Bronze	Sören Claeson; Sweden

== Tournament results ==
The wrestlers are divided into 2 groups. The winner of each group decided by a double-elimination system.

Legend

- TF — Won by Fall
- ST — Won by Technical Superiority, 12 points difference
- PP — Won by Points, 1-7 points difference, the loser with points
- PO — Won by Points, 1-7 points difference, the loser without points
- SP — Won by Points, 8-11 points difference, the loser with points
- SO — Won by Points, 8-11 points difference, the loser without points
- P0 — Won by Passivity, scoring zero points
- P1 — Won by Passivity, while leading by 1-7 points
- PS — Won by Passivity, while leading by 8-11 points
- DC — Won by Decision, 0-0 score
- PA — Won by Opponent Injury
- DQ — Won by Forfeit
- DNA — Did not appear
- L — Losses
- ER — Round of Elimination
- CP — Classification Points
- TP — Technical Points

=== Eliminatory round ===
==== Group A ====
L		CP	TP		L
Round 1
1	Kim Sang-Kyu (KOR)	1-3 PP	4-5	Mohamed El-Ashram (EGY)	0
1	Mustafa Suzan (TUR)	0-4 ST	0-15	Louis Santerre (CAN)	0
1	Daniel Chandler (USA)	0-3 PO	0-4	Sören Claeson (SWE)	0
0	Ion Draica (ROU)	3-1 PP	4-4	Klaus Mysen (NOR)	1
Round 2
1	Kim Sang-Kyu (KOR)	3-0 P1	5:37	Mustafa Suzan (TUR)	2
0	Mohamed El-Ashram (EGY)	4-0 TF	0:45	Louis Santerre (CAN)	1
2	Daniel Chandler (USA)	0-3 P1	5:38	Ion Draica (ROU)	0
0	Sören Claeson (SWE)	3-1 DC	0-0	Klaus Mysen (NOR)	2
Round 3
2	Kim Sang-Kyu (KOR)	1-3 PP	8-10	Louis Santerre (CAN)	1
1	Mohamed El-Ashram (EGY)	0-3 PO	0-3	Sören Claeson (SWE)	0
0	Ion Draica (ROU)			Bye	
Round 4
0	Ion Draica (ROU)	3-1 PP	3-1	Mohamed El-Ashram (EGY)	2
2	Louis Santerre (CAN)	1-3 PP	4-11	Sören Claeson (SWE)	0
Final
	Ion Draica (ROU)	3.5-0 SO	10-0	Sören Claeson (SWE)	

Wrestler	L	ER	CP	Final
Ion Draica (ROU)	0	-	9	3.5
Sören Claeson (SWE)	0	-	12	0
Mohamed El-Ashram (EGY)	2	4	8	
Louis Santerre (CAN)	2	4	8	
Kim Sang-Kyu (KOR)	2	3	5	
Klaus Mysen (NOR)	2	2	2	
Daniel Chandler (USA)	2	2	0	
Mustafa Suzan (TUR)	2	2	0	

==== Group B ====
L		CP	TP		L
Round 1
1	Dimitrios Thanopoulos (GRE)	3-0 P1	5:22	Yasutoshi Moriyama (JPN)	1
1	Georg Marchl (AUT)	0-3 P1	5:34	Siegfried Seibold (FRG)	0
0	Momir Petković (YUG)	3-0 PO	6-0	Jarmo Övermark (FIN)	1
0	Ernesto Razzino (ITA)			Bye	
Round 2
1	Ernesto Razzino (ITA)	1-3 PP	4-6	Dimitrios Thanopoulos (GRE)	0
2	Yasutoshi Moriyama (JPN)	0-3 P1	5:19	Georg Marchl (AUT)	1
1	Siegfried Seibold (FRG)	0-3 PO	0-1	Momir Petković (YUG)	0
1	Jarmo Övermark (FIN)			Bye	
Round 3
1	Jarmo Övermark (FIN)	3-1 PP	10-5	Ernesto Razzino (ITA)	2
0	Dimitrios Thanopoulos (GRE)	3-1 PP	7-6	Siegfried Seibold (FRG)	2
2	Georg Marchl (AUT)	0-3 PO	0-5	Momir Petković (YUG)	0
Final
	Momir Petković (YUG)	3-0 PO	6-0	Jarmo Övermark (FIN)	
	Jarmo Övermark (FIN)	3-1 PP	6-1	Dimitrios Thanopoulos (GRE)	
	Dimitrios Thanopoulos (GRE)	3-1 PP	5-1	Momir Petković (YUG)	

Wrestler	L	ER	CP	Final
Dimitrios Thanopoulos (GRE)	0	-	9	4
Momir Petković (YUG)	0	-	9	4
Jarmo Övermark (FIN)	1	-	3	3
Siegfried Seibold (FRG)	2	3	4	
Georg Marchl (AUT)	2	3	3	
Ernesto Razzino (ITA)	2	3	2	
Yasutoshi Moriyama (JPN)	2	2	0	

=== Final round ===
	CP	TP	
5th place match
Mohamed El-Ashram (EGY)	1-3 PP	3-5	Jarmo Övermark (FIN)
Bronze medal match
Sören Claeson (SWE)	3-1 PP	5-2	Momir Petković (YUG)
Gold medal match
Ion Draica (ROU)	3-1 PP	4-3	Dimitrios Thanopoulos (GRE)

== Final standings ==
1. Ion Draica (ROU)
2. Dimitrios Thanopoulos (GRE)
3. Sören Claeson (SWE)
4. Momir Petković (YUG)
5. Jarmo Övermark (FIN)
6. Mohamed El-Ashram (EGY)
7. Louis Santerre (CAN)
8. Kim Sang-Kyu (KOR)
