= 1981 European Wrestling Championships =

Sporting event

- Host city: Poland, Łódź (Freestyle); Sweden Gothenburg (Greco-Roman)
- Dates: 23–26 April 1981; 8–11 April 1981

Champions
- Freestyle: Bulgaria
- Greco-Roman: Bulgaria

The 1981 European Wrestling Championships were held in the men's Freestyle style in Łódź, Poland on 23–26 April 1981; the Greco-Romane style in Gothenburg, Sweden on 8–11 April 1981.

== Medal table ==
Rank	Nation	Gold	Silver	Bronze	Total
1	Soviet Union	8	5	4	17
2	Bulgaria	5	4	4	13
3	East Germany	2	1	3	6
4	Poland	1	3	4	8
5	Hungary	1	3	0	4
6	Sweden	1	1	1	3
6	West Germany	1	1	1	3
8	Romania	1	1	0	2
9	Italy	0	1	0	1
10	Finland	0	0	1	1
10	Greece	0	0	1	1
10	Turkey	0	0	1	1
Totals (12 entries)		20	20	20	60

== Medal summary ==
=== Men's freestyle ===
Event	Gold	Silver	Bronze
48 kg	Ali Mejmedov; Bulgaria	Claudio Pollio; Italy	Roman Dmitriyev; Soviet Union
52 kg	Hartmut Reich; East Germany	Lajos Szabó; Hungary	Valentin Yordanov; Bulgaria
57 kg	Stefan Ivanov; Bulgaria	Bernd Bobrich; East Germany	Andrei Yartsev; Soviet Union
62 kg	Buzai Ibraguimov; Soviet Union	Marian Skubacz; Poland	Simeon Shterev Sr. Bulgaria
68 kg	Miho Dukov; Bulgaria	Mikhail Jarachura; Soviet Union	Eberhard Probst; East Germany
74 kg	Elbrus Koroyev; Soviet Union	Valentin Raychev; Bulgaria	Martin Knosp; West Germany
82 kg	Oleg Kaloyev; Soviet Union	Efraim Kamberov; Bulgaria	Peter Syring; East Germany
90 kg	Uwe Neupert; East Germany	Gheorghe Broșteanu; Romania	Vladimir Batnia; Soviet Union
100 kg	Magomed Magomedov; Soviet Union	Tomasz Busse; Poland	Roland Gehrke; East Germany
+100 kg	Salman Hashimikov; Soviet Union	József Balla; Hungary	Adam Sandurski; Poland

=== Men's Greco-Roman ===
Event	Gold	Silver	Bronze
48 kg	Totio Andonov; Bulgaria	Viktor Savchuk; Soviet Union	Salih Bora; Turkey
52 kg	Benur Pashayan; Soviet Union	Lajos Rácz; Hungary	Liubomir Tsekov; Bulgaria
57 kg	Pasquale Passarelli; West Germany	Benni Ljungbeck; Sweden	Piotr Michalik; Poland
62 kg	Ryszard Świerad; Poland	Panayot Kirov; Bulgaria	Farhat Mustafin; Soviet Union
68 kg	Ștefan Rusu; Romania	Erich Klaus; West Germany	Tapio Sipilä; Finland
74 kg	Ferenc Kocsis; Hungary	Vladimir Galkin; Soviet Union	Andrzej Supron; Poland
82 kg	Gennady Korban; Soviet Union	Jan Dołgowicz; Poland	Pavel Pavlov; Bulgaria
90 kg	Frank Andersson; Sweden	Alxandr Dubrovski; Soviet Union	Yeoryos Pozidis; Greece
100 kg	Nikolai Inkov; Soviet Union	Andrey Dimitrov; Bulgaria	Christer Gulldén; Sweden
+100 kg	Rangel Gerovski; Bulgaria	Yevgueni Artiujin; Soviet Union	Henryk Tomanek; Poland
