= 1979 European Wrestling Championships =

- Host city: Romania, Bucharest
- Dates: 16 – 21 April 1979

Champions
- Freestyle: Soviet Union
- Greco-Roman: Romania

The 1979 European Wrestling Championships was held from 16 to 21 April 1979 in Bucharest, Romania.

== Medal table ==
Rank	Nation	Gold	Silver	Bronze	Total
1	Soviet Union	11	2	2	15
2	Romania	3	3	4	10
3	Bulgaria	2	4	4	10
4	Hungary	1	3	1	5
5	East Germany	1	2	1	4
6	Greece	1	0	0	1
6	Sweden	1	0	0	1
8	Poland	0	3	5	8
9	West Germany	0	3	1	4
10	Czechoslovakia	0	0	1	1
10	Turkey	0	0	1	1
Totals (11 entries)		20	20	20	60

== Medal summary ==
=== Men's freestyle ===
Event	Gold	Silver	Bronze
48 kg	Arshak Sanoyan; Soviet Union	Jan Falandys; Poland	Aurel Rentea; Romania
52 kg	Iragui Shugayev; Soviet Union	Hartmut Reich; East Germany	Andrzej Kudelski; Poland
57 kg	Sergei Beloglazov; Soviet Union	Aurel Neagu; Romania	Ivan Tsochev; Bulgaria
62 kg	Miho Dukov; Bulgaria	Eduard Giray; West Germany	Jan Szymański; Poland
68 kg	Nikolay Petrenko; Soviet Union	Ivan Yankov; Bulgaria	Eberhard Probst; East Germany
74 kg	Musan Abdul-Muslimov; Soviet Union	Martin Knosp; West Germany	Aleksandar Nanev; Bulgaria
82 kg	Oleg Alekseev; Soviet Union	István Kovács; Hungary	Adolf Seger; West Germany
90 kg	Uwe Neupert; East Germany	Alash Daudov; Soviet Union	Ivan Guinov; Bulgaria
100 kg	Ilya Mate; Soviet Union	Slavcho Chervenkov; Bulgaria	Vasile Pușcașu; Romania
+100 kg	Salman Hashimikov; Soviet Union	Roland Gehrke; East Germany	Adam Sandurski; Poland

=== Men's Greco-Roman ===
Event	Gold	Silver	Bronze
48 kg	Constantin Alexandru; Romania	Pavel Jristov; Bulgaria	Anatoli Bozin; Soviet Union
52 kg	Robert Nersesian; Soviet Union	Nicu Gingă; Romania	Lajos Rácz; Hungary
57 kg	Shamil Serikov; Soviet Union	Pasquale Passarelli; West Germany	Josef Krysta; Czechoslovakia
62 kg	Stelios Mygiakis; Greece	Tamás Tóth; Hungary	Kazimierz Lipień; Poland
68 kg	Ștefan Rusu; Romania	Ivan Saikov; Bulgaria	Andrzej Supron; Poland
74 kg	Ferenc Kocsis; Hungary	Viacheslav Mkrtychev; Soviet Union	Nedko Nedev; Bulgaria
82 kg	Ion Draica; Romania	Jan Dołgowicz; Poland	Taymuraz Apkhazava; Soviet Union
90 kg	Frank Andersson; Sweden	Norbert Növényi; Hungary	Petre Dicu; Romania
100 kg	Nikolay Balboshin; Soviet Union	Roman Bierła; Poland	Vasile Andrei; Romania
+100 kg	Aleksandar Tomov; Bulgaria	Roman Codreanu; Romania	Kenan Ege; Turkey
