= Wrestling at the 1976 Summer Olympics – Men's freestyle 74 kg =

Men's freestyle 74 kg at the Games of the XXI Olympiad
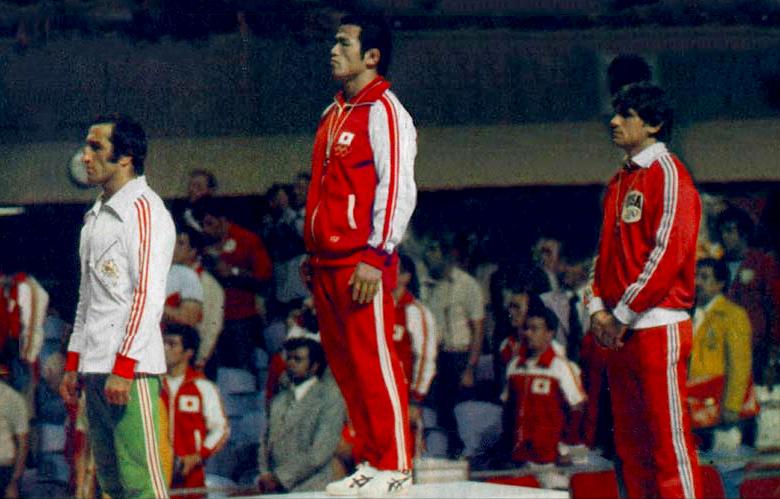
- Medal winners
- Venue: Maurice Richard Arena
- Dates: 27–31 July 1976
- Competitors: 21 from 21 nations

Medalists
1st place, gold medalist(s)		Jiichiro Date	Japan
2nd place, silver medalist(s)		Mansour Barzegar	Iran
3rd place, bronze medalist(s)		Stanley Dziedzic	United States

The Men's Freestyle 74 kg at the 1976 Summer Olympics as part of the wrestling program were held at the Maurice Richard Arena.

== Medalists ==
Gold	Jiichiro Date; Japan
Silver	Mansour Barzegar; Iran
Bronze	Stanley Dziedzic; United States

== Tournament results ==
The competition used a form of negative points tournament, with negative points given for any result short of a fall. Accumulation of 6 negative points eliminated the loser wrestler. When only three wrestlers remain, a special final round is used to determine the order of the medals.

Legend

- TF — Won by Fall
- IN — Won by Opponent Injury
- DQ — Won by Passivity
- D1 — Won by Passivity, the winner is passive too
- D2 — Both wrestlers lost by Passivity
- FF — Won by Forfeit
- DNA — Did not appear
- TPP — Total penalty points
- MPP — Match penalty points

Penalties

- 0 — Won by Fall, Technical Superiority, Passivity, Injury and Forfeit
- 0.5 — Won by Points, 8-11 points difference
- 1 — Won by Points, 1-7 points difference
- 2 — Won by Passivity, the winner is passive too
- 3 — Lost by Points, 1-7 points difference
- 3.5 — Lost by Points, 8-11 points difference
- 4 — Lost by Fall, Technical Superiority, Passivity, Injury and Forfeit

=== Round 1 ===
TPP	MPP		Score		MPP	TPP
3	3	Ruslan Ashuraliyev (URS)	6 - 6	Mansour Barzegar (IRI)	1	1
0	0	Yancho Pavlov (BUL)	21 - 0	Mihály Toma (HUN)	4	4
0	0	Marin Pîrcălabu (ROU)	DQ / 5:55	Keith Haward (GBR)	4	4
0	0	Jarmo Övermark (FIN)	TF / 1:23	Ivan David (ISV)	4	4
4	4	Yakup Topuz (TUR)	3 - 16	Dan Karabin (TCH)	0	0
4	4	Kiro Ristov (YUG)	2 - 16	Yu Jae-gwon (KOR)	0	0
4	4	Brian Renken (CAN)	TF / 1:31	Fred Hempel (GDR)	0	0
4	4	Bruce Akers (AUS)	1 - 24	Jan Karlsson (SWE)	0	0
0	0	Jiichiro Date (JPN)	TF / 1:41	Dennis Herrick (PUR)	4	4
4	4	Zevegiin Düvchin (MGL)	DQ / 3:18	Stanley Dziedzic (USA)	0	0
0		Giuseppe Spagnoli (ITA)		Bye		

=== Round 2 ===
TPP	MPP		Score		MPP	TPP
4	4	Giuseppe Spagnoli (ITA)	TF / 4:28	Ruslan Ashuraliyev (URS)	0	3
2	1	Mansour Barzegar (IRI)	11 - 5	Yancho Pavlov (BUL)	3	3
7	3	Mihály Toma (HUN)	4 - 5	Marin Pîrcălabu (ROU)	1	1
8	4	Keith Haward (GBR)	TF / 2:45	Jarmo Övermark (FIN)	0	0
7	3	Yakup Topuz (TUR)	6 - 12	Kiro Ristov (YUG)	1	5
0.5	0.5	Dan Karabin (TCH)	16 - 6	Yoo Jae-Kwon (KOR)	3.5	3.5
5	1	Brian Renken (CAN)	11 - 4	Bruce Akers (AUS)	3	7
1	1	Fred Hempel (GDR)	11 - 4	Jan Karlsson (SWE)	3	3
0	0	Jiichiro Date (JPN)	TF / 1:39	Zevegiin Düvchin (MGL)	4	8
8	4	Dennis Herrick (PUR)	TF / 4:11	Stanley Dziedzic (USA)	0	0
4		Ivan David (ISV)		DNA		

=== Round 3 ===
TPP	MPP		Score		MPP	TPP
8	4	Giuseppe Spagnoli (ITA)	DQ / 8:49	Mansour Barzegar (IRI)	0	2
3.5	0.5	Ruslan Ashuraliyev (URS)	13 - 4	Yancho Pavlov (BUL)	3.5	6.5
2	1	Marin Pîrcălabu (ROU)	11 - 6	Jarmo Övermark (FIN)	3	3
4.5	4	Dan Karabin (TCH)	IN / 5:05	Kiro Ristov (YUG)	0	5
4.5	1	Yoo Jae-Kwon (KOR)	12 - 9	Brian Renken (CAN)	3	8
5	4	Fred Hempel (GDR)	TF / 7:03	Jiichiro Date (JPN)	0	0
6	3	Jan Karlsson (SWE)	5 - 11	Stanley Dziedzic (USA)	1	1

=== Round 4 ===
TPP	MPP		Score		MPP	TPP
4.5	1	Ruslan Ashuraliyev (URS)	10 - 4	Marin Pîrcălabu (ROU)	3	5
2	0	Mansour Barzegar (IRI)	DQ / 7:45	Jarmo Övermark (FIN)	4	7
8	3	Kiro Ristov (YUG)	12 - 16	Fred Hempel (GDR)	1	6
8.5	4	Yoo Jae-Kwon (KOR)	TF / 2:13	Jiichiro Date (JPN)	0	0
1		Stanley Dziedzic (USA)		Bye		
4.5		Dan Karabin (TCH)		DNA		

=== Round 5 ===
TPP	MPP		Score		MPP	TPP
2	1	Stanley Dziedzic (USA)	9 - 6	Ruslan Ashuraliyev (URS)	3	7.5
2	0	Mansour Barzegar (IRI)	23 - 8	Fred Hempel (GDR)	4	10
9	4	Marin Pîrcălabu (ROU)	TF / 4:06	Jiichiro Date (JPN)	0	0

=== Final ===
Results from the preliminary round are carried forward into the final (shown in yellow).

TPP	MPP		Score		MPP	TPP
	3	Stanley Dziedzic (USA)	8 - 11	Mansour Barzegar (IRI)	1	
	1	Jiichiro Date (JPN)	10 - 5	Stanley Dziedzic (USA)	3	6
5	4	Mansour Barzegar (IRI)	TF / 6:07	Jiichiro Date (JPN)	0	1

== Final standings ==
1. Jiichiro Date (JPN)
2. Mansour Barzegar (IRI)
3. Stanley Dziedzic (USA)
4. Ruslan Ashuraliyev (URS)
5. Marin Pîrcălabu (ROU)
6. Fred Hempel (GDR)
7. Jarmo Övermark (FIN)
8. Kiro Ristov (YUG)
