= Wrestling at the 1987 Mediterranean Games =

Wrestling competition

- Dates: September 1987

The wrestling tournament at the 1987 Mediterranean Games was held in Latakia, Syria.

== Medal table ==
* Host nation (Syria)

Rank	Nation	Gold	Silver	Bronze	Total
1	Turkey	6	2	5	13
2	Yugoslavia	4	2	4	10
3	Italy	4	0	3	7
4	Syria	3	4	1	8
5	Greece	2	5	4	11
6	France	1	3	1	5
7	Egypt	0	2	2	4
8	Morocco	0	1	0	1
8	Tunisia	0	1	0	1
Totals (9 entries)		20	20	20	60

== Medalists ==
=== Men's freestyle ===
Event	Gold	Silver	Bronze
48 kg	Mohamed El-Messouti; Syria	Mirko Dimčevski; Yugoslavia	Mustafa Öcal; Turkey
52 kg	Aslan Seyhanlı; Turkey	Abaz Emini; Yugoslavia	Khaled El-Ali El-Rifai; Syria
57 kg	Šaban Trstena; Yugoslavia	Mahmoud El-Messouti; Syria	Ahmet Ak; Turkey
62 kg	Giovanni Schillaci; Italy	Selman Kaygusuz; Turkey	Nusret Hamidi; Yugoslavia
68 kg	Georgios Athanasiadis; Greece	Éric Brulon; France	Fabiano Vitrano; Italy
74 kg	Fevzi Şeker; Turkey	Ioakeim Vasiliadis; Greece	Šaban Sejdi; Yugoslavia
82 kg	Necmi Gençalp; Turkey	Mohamed Akrad; Syria	Kostas Avramis; Greece
90 kg	Reşit Karabacak; Turkey	Zouhair Seghaier; Tunisia	Iraklis Deskoulidis; Greece
100 kg	Ayhan Taşkın; Turkey	Ahmad Al-Shamy; Syria	Gianni Chelucci; Italy
130 kg	Hayri Sezgin; Turkey	Minas Karajanidis; Greece	Hassan El-Haddad; Egypt

=== Men's Greco-Roman ===
Event	Gold	Silver	Bronze
48 kg	Khaled Al-Faraj; Syria	Georgios Nikitas; Greece	Sergio Armenise; Italy
52 kg	Vincenzo Maenza; Italy	Serge Robert; France	Muhammet Öztürk; Turkey
57 kg	Patrice Mourier; France	Babis Kholidis; Greece	Mehmet Karadağ; Turkey
62 kg	Ayman Rihawi; Syria	Dimitrios Karapandzidis; Greece	Gradimir Dedić; Yugoslavia
68 kg	Nandor Sabo; Yugoslavia	Saïd Souaken; Morocco	Sümer Koçak; Turkey
74 kg	Franc Podlesek; Yugoslavia	Zouheir Hory; Syria	Martial Mischler; France
82 kg	Ernesto Razzino; Italy	Mustafa Suzan; Turkey	Dimitrios Thanopoulos; Greece
90 kg	Georgios Poikilidis; Greece	Henri Meiss; France	Kamal Ibrahim; Egypt
100 kg	Emil Trauber; Yugoslavia	Ali Geberdar; Egypt	Panagiotis Poikilidis; Greece
130 kg	Fabio Valguarnera; Italy	Hassan El-Haddad; Egypt	Vladislav Kočović; Yugoslavia
