= Ilya Mate =

Soviet and Ukrainian freestyle wrestler

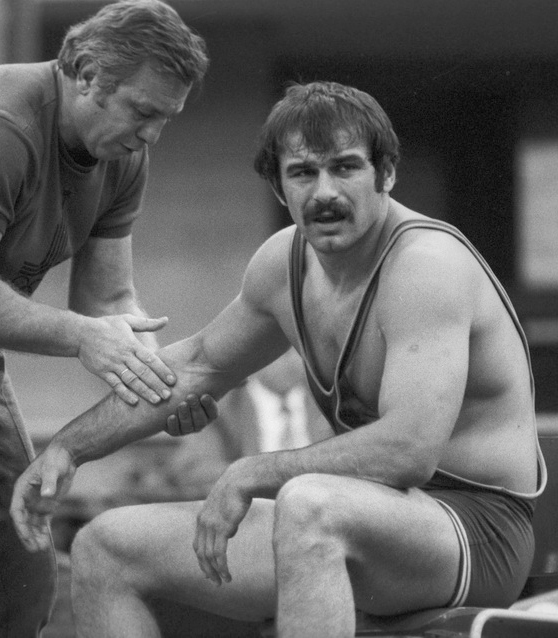
- Mate receiving an arm massage in-between the periods of his Olympic match, 25 July 1980

Personal information
- Born: 6 October 1956 (age 69) Starohnativka, Donetsk Oblast, Ukrainian SSR, Soviet Union
- Education: Makiivka Civil Engineering Institute
- Height: 187 cm (6 ft 2 in)
- Weight: 100 kg (220 lb)

Sport
- Sport: Freestyle wrestling
- Club: Kolos Donetsk
Medal record
Representing the Soviet Union
Olympic Games
Gold medal – first place	1980 Moscow	100 kg
World Championships
Gold medal – first place	1979 San Diego	100 kg
Gold medal – first place	1982 Edmonton	100 kg
Bronze medal – third place	1981 Skopje	100 kg
European Championships
Gold medal – first place	1979 Bucharest	100 kg
Summer Universiade
Gold medal – first place	1981 Bucharest	100 kg

Illya Fedorovych Mate (spelled Maté, Russian: Илья Фёдорович Мате, IPA: [ɪˈlʲjæ maˈtɛ], born 6 October 1956) is a retired Soviet and Ukrainian freestyle wrestler. He won gold medals at the 1980 Olympics and 1979 and 1982 world championships, finishing third in 1981. Mate was reputed for his deceitfully flabby appearance, which misled his opponents into thinking of him as of an "easy prey," as well as for his springy sudden movements and the mat generalship, avoiding flukes, and providing no "chinks in the armor" for his opponents.

== Biography ==
=== Early years ===
Mate was born to a Greek father and Ukrainian mother. He began training in kuresh wrestling while studying in a secondary school.

=== Prime years ===
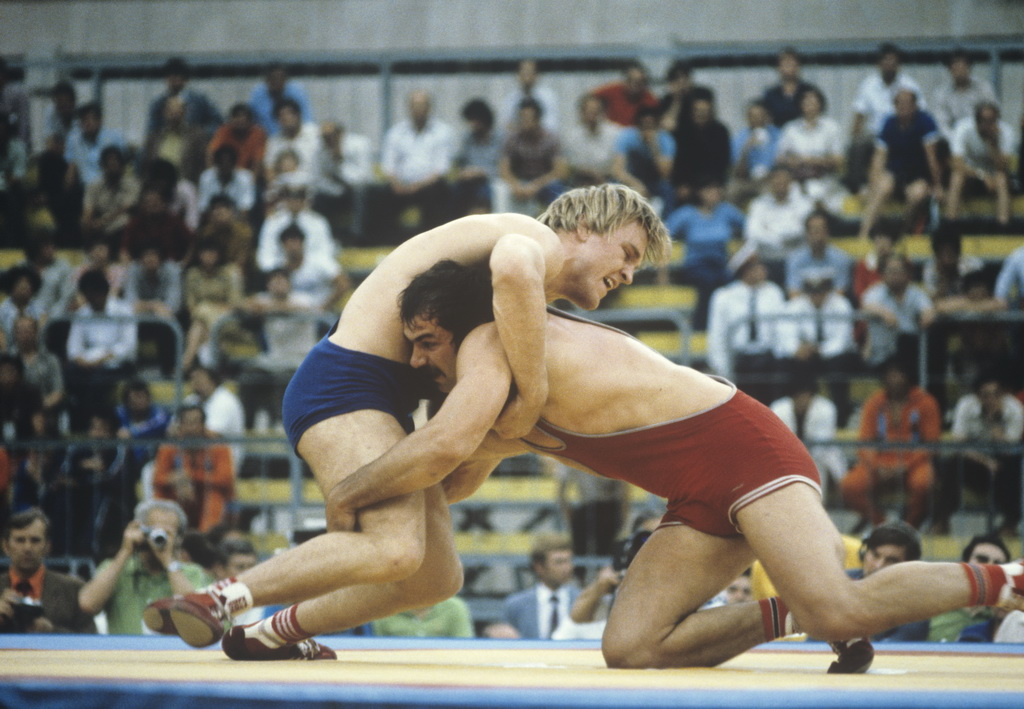
Mate (in red) goes for a double leg takedown on Július Strnisko

He took up freestyle wrestling in 1970 and won the Soviet heavyweight title in 1978–80 and 1982.

=== Retirement and later years ===
After retiring from competitions he worked as a private entrepreneur in Donetsk, and remained involved with the Donetsk Wrestling Federation. Since 2003, an annual junior freestyle wrestling tournament has been held in Donetsk Oblast in his honor.

== International competition record ==
International competition record (incomplete)
Res.	Opponent	Score	Time	Date	Event	Location
1980 Olympic Gold Medalist at 100kg
Win	(Czechoslovakia) Július Strnisko	15–3		1980-07	1980 Summer Olympics	(Soviet Union) Moscow
Win	(Polish People's Republic) Tomasz Busse	9–2		1980-07	1980 Summer Olympics	(Soviet Union) Moscow
Win	(People's Republic of Bulgaria) Slavcho Chervenkov	6–4		1980-07	1980 Summer Olympics	(Soviet Union) Moscow
Win	(Hungarian People's Republic) Antal Bodó	Tech Fall	1:41	1980-07	1980 Summer Olympics	(Soviet Union) Moscow
Win	(Cuba) Bárbaro Morgan	Passivity	7:02	1980-07	1980 Summer Olympics	(Soviet Union) Moscow
Win	(Spain) Santiago Morales	Tech Fall	3:42	1980-07	1980 Summer Olympics	(Soviet Union) Moscow
