= Wrestling at the 1980 Summer Olympics – Men's freestyle 74 kg =

Men's freestyle 74 kg at the Games of the XXII Olympiad
- Venue: Central Sports Club of the Army
- Dates: 28–30 July 1980
- Competitors: 18 from 18 nations

Medalists
1st place, gold medalist(s)		Valentin Raychev	Bulgaria
2nd place, silver medalist(s)		Jamtsyn Davaajav	Mongolia
3rd place, bronze medalist(s)		Dan Karabin	Czechoslovakia

The Men's Freestyle 74 kg at the 1980 Summer Olympics as part of the wrestling program were held at the Athletics Fieldhouse, Central Sports Club of the Army.

== Medalists ==
Gold	Valentin Raychev; Bulgaria
Silver	Jamtsyn Davaajav; Mongolia
Bronze	Dan Karabin; Czechoslovakia

== Tournament results ==
The competition used a form of negative points tournament, with negative points given for any result short of a fall. Accumulation of 6 negative points eliminated the loser wrestler. When only three wrestlers remain, a special final round is used to determine the order of the medals.

Legend

- TF — Won by Fall
- IN — Won by Opponent Injury
- DQ — Won by Passivity
- D1 — Won by Passivity, the winner is passive too
- D2 — Both wrestlers lost by Passivity
- FF — Won by Forfeit
- DNA — Did not appear
- TPP — Total penalty points
- MPP — Match penalty points

Penalties

- 0 — Won by Fall, Technical Superiority, Passivity, Injury and Forfeit
- 0.5 — Won by Points, 8-11 points difference
- 1 — Won by Points, 1-7 points difference
- 2 — Won by Passivity, the winner is passive too
- 3 — Lost by Points, 1-7 points difference
- 3.5 — Lost by Points, 8-11 points difference
- 4 — Lost by Fall, Technical Superiority, Passivity, Injury and Forfeit

=== Round 1 ===
TPP	MPP		Score		MPP	TPP
0	0	Khojawahid Zahedi (AFG)	TF / 5:39	Bani Merje Fawaz (SYR)	4	4
3	3	Reinhold Steingräber (GDR)	8 - 14	Rajinder Singh (IND)	1	1
0	0	Valentin Raychev (BUL)	TF / 4:20	Bartholomäus Brötzner (AUT)	4	4
0	0	Riccardo Niccolini (ITA)	TF / 8:46	Marin Pîrcălabu (ROU)	4	4
4	4	Isaie Tonye (CMR)	TF / 2:09	Jamtsyn Davaajav (MGL)	0	0
0	0	Ryszard Ścigalski (POL)	TF / 2:45	Ibrahim Khalil Juma (IRQ)	4	4
0	0	Pavel Pinigin (URS)	TF / 0:52	Rudolf Marro (SUI)	4	4
4	4	Fitzloyd Walker (GBR)	6 - 25	István Fehér (HUN)	0	0
1	1	Dan Karabin (TCH)	9 - 2	Kiro Ristov (YUG)	3	3

=== Round 2 ===
TPP	MPP		Score		MPP	TPP
4	4	Khojawahid Zahedi (AFG)	TF / 4:54	Reinhold Steingräber (GDR)	0	3
8	4	Bani Merje Fawaz (SYR)	TF / 0:55	Rajinder Singh (IND)	0	1
0	0	Valentin Raychev (BUL)	TF / 7:59	Riccardo Niccolini (ITA)	4	4
8	4	Bartholomäus Brötzner (AUT)	TF / 8:01	Marin Pîrcălabu (ROU)	0	4
8	4	Isaie Tonye (CMR)	TF / 1:58	Ryszard Ścigalski (POL)	0	0
0	0	Jamtsyn Davaajav (MGL)	TF / 2:42	Ibrahim Khalil Juma (IRQ)	4	8
0	0	Pavel Pinigin (URS)	TF / 1:24	Fitzloyd Walker (GBR)	4	8
8	4	Rudolf Marro (SUI)	TF / 2:59	Dan Karabin (TCH)	0	1
1	1	István Fehér (HUN)	8 - 6	Kiro Ristov (YUG)	3	6

=== Round 3 ===
TPP	MPP		Score		MPP	TPP
7	4	Reinhold Steingräber (GDR)	6 - 25	Valentin Raychev (BUL)	0	0
4	3	Rajinder Singh (IND)	8 - 8	Riccardo Niccolini (ITA)	1	5
7	3	Marin Pîrcălabu (ROU)	4 - 9	Jamtsyn Davaajav (MGL)	1	1
4	4	Ryszard Ścigalski (POL)	TF / 7:11	Pavel Pinigin (URS)	0	0
5	4	István Fehér (HUN)	IN / 3:14	Dan Karabin (TCH)	0	1
4		Khojawahid Zahedi (AFG)		DNA		

=== Round 4 ===
TPP	MPP		Score		MPP	TPP
7	3	Rajinder Singh (IND)	8 - 12	Valentin Raychev (BUL)	1	1
9	4	Riccardo Niccolini (ITA)	2 - 20	Jamtsyn Davaajav (MGL)	0	1
4	0	Ryszard Ścigalski (POL)	DQ / 6:48	István Fehér (HUN)	4	9
4.5	3.5	Dan Karabin (TCH)	1 - 11	Pavel Pinigin (URS)	0.5	0.5

=== Round 5 ===
TPP	MPP		Score		MPP	TPP
2	1	Valentin Raychev (BUL)	9 - 4	Ryszard Ścigalski (POL)	3	7
5	4	Jamtsyn Davaajav (MGL)	D2 / 7:08	Pavel Pinigin (URS)	4	4.5
4.5		Dan Karabin (TCH)		Bye		

=== Round 6 ===
TPP	MPP		Score		MPP	TPP
7.5	3	Dan Karabin (TCH)	5 - 6	Jamtsyn Davaajav (MGL)	1	6
2	0	Valentin Raychev (BUL)	TF / 1:59	Pavel Pinigin (URS)	4	8.5

=== Final ===
Results from the preliminary round are carried forward into the final (shown in yellow).

TPP	MPP		Score		MPP	TPP
	3	Dan Karabin (TCH)	5 - 6	Jamtsyn Davaajav (MGL)	1	
6	3	Dan Karabin (TCH)	6 - 10	Valentin Raychev (BUL)	1	
4	3	Jamtsyn Davaajav (MGL)	5 - 6	Valentin Raychev (BUL)	1	2

== Final standings ==
1. Valentin Raychev (BUL)
2. Jamtsyn Davaajav (MGL)
3. Dan Karabin (TCH)
4. Pavel Pinigin (URS)
5. Ryszard Ścigalski (POL)
6. Rajinder Singh (IND)
7. István Fehér (HUN)
8. Riccardo Niccolini (ITA)
