= Wrestling at the 1980 Summer Olympics – Men's Greco-Roman 82 kg =

Men's Greco-Roman 82 kg at the Games of the XXII Olympiad
- Venue: Central Sports Club of the Army
- Dates: 22–24 July 1980
- Competitors: 12 from 12 nations

Medalists
1st place, gold medalist(s)		Gennadi Korban	Soviet Union
2nd place, silver medalist(s)		Jan Dołgowicz	Poland
3rd place, bronze medalist(s)		Pavel Pavlov	Bulgaria

The Men's Greco-Roman 82 kg at the 1980 Summer Olympics as part of the wrestling program were held at the Athletics Fieldhouse, Central Sports Club of the Army.

== Medalists ==
Gold	Gennadi Korban; Soviet Union
Silver	Jan Dołgowicz; Poland
Bronze	Pavel Pavlov; Bulgaria

== Tournament results ==
The competition used a form of negative points tournament, with negative points given for any result short of a fall. Accumulation of 6 negative points eliminated the loser wrestler. When only three wrestlers remain, a special final round is used to determine the order of the medals.

Legend

- TF — Won by Fall
- IN — Won by Opponent Injury
- DQ — Won by Passivity
- D1 — Won by Passivity, the winner is passive too
- D2 — Both wrestlers lost by Passivity
- FF — Won by Forfeit
- DNA — Did not appear
- TPP — Total penalty points
- MPP — Match penalty points

Penalties

- 0 — Won by Fall, Technical Superiority, Passivity, Injury and Forfeit
- 0.5 — Won by Points, 8-11 points difference
- 1 — Won by Points, 1-7 points difference
- 2 — Won by Passivity, the winner is passive too
- 3 — Lost by Points, 1-7 points difference
- 3.5 — Lost by Points, 8-11 points difference
- 4 — Lost by Fall, Technical Superiority, Passivity, Injury and Forfeit

=== Round 1 ===
TPP	MPP		Score		MPP	TPP
4	4	Fernando San Isidro (ESP)	TF / 4:18	Detlef Kühn (GDR)	0	0
4	4	Aduuchiin Baatarkhüü (MGL)	TF / 3:48	Pavel Pavlov (BUL)	0	0
0	0	Gennadi Korban (URS)	DQ / 5:37	Mihály Toma (HUN)	4	4
1	1	Mohamed El-Oulabi (SYR)	13 - 11	Miroslav Janota (TCH)	3	3
4	4	Jan Dołgowicz (POL)	D2 / 7:06	Ion Draica (ROU)	4	4
3	3	Jarmo Övermark (FIN)	5 - 8	Leif Andersson (SWE)	1	1

=== Round 2 ===
TPP	MPP		Score		MPP	TPP
8	4	Fernando San-Isidro (ESP)	D2 / 7:00	Aduuchiin Baatarkhüü (MGL)	4	8
4	4	Detlef Kühn (GDR)	DQ / 5:42	Pavel Pavlov (BUL)	0	0
0	0	Gennadi Korban (URS)	DQ / 7:50	Mohammad El-Oulabi (SYR)	4	5
4	0	Mihály Toma (HUN)	DQ / 7:01	Miroslav Janota (TCH)	4	7
4	0	Jan Dołgowicz (POL)	TF / 2:17	Jarmo Övermark (FIN)	4	7
8	4	Ion Draica (ROU)	D2 / 7:09	Leif Andersson (SWE)	4	5

=== Round 3 ===
TPP	MPP		Score		MPP	TPP
8	4	Detlef Kühn (GDR)	TF / 5:41	Gennadi Korban (URS)	0	0
0	0	Pavel Pavlov (BUL)	DQ / 8:01	Mihály Toma (HUN)	4	8
9	4	Mohammad El-Oulabi (SYR)	DQ / 5:34	Jan Dołgowicz (POL)	0	4
5		Leif Andersson (SWE)		Bye		

=== Round 4 ===
TPP	MPP		Score		MPP	TPP
8	3	Leif Andersson (SWE)	3 - 4	Pavel Pavlov (BUL)	1	1
1	1	Gennadi Korban (URS)	11 - 4	Jan Dołgowicz (POL)	3	7

=== Final ===
Results from the preliminary round are carried forward into the final (shown in yellow).

TPP	MPP		Score		MPP	TPP
	1	Gennadi Korban (URS)	11 - 4	Jan Dołgowicz (POL)	3	
	3	Pavel Pavlov (BUL)	7 - 13	Gennadi Korban (URS)	1	2
3	0	Jan Dołgowicz (POL)	TF / 1:28	Pavel Pavlov (BUL)	4	7

== Final standings ==
1. Gennadi Korban (URS)
2. Jan Dołgowicz (POL)
3. Pavel Pavlov (BUL)
4. Leif Andersson (SWE)
5. Detlef Kühn (GDR)
6. Mihály Toma (HUN)
7. Mohammad El-Oulabi (SYR)
8. Miroslav Janota (TCH)
