= Wrestling at the 1979 Mediterranean Games =

Wrestling competition

- Dates: September 1979

The wrestling tournament at the 1979 Mediterranean Games was held in Split, Yugoslavia.

== Medal table ==
* Host nation (Yugoslavia)

Rank	Nation	Gold	Silver	Bronze	Total
1	Yugoslavia	11	1	2	14
2	Turkey	5	4	5	14
3	Italy	2	6	5	13
4	Greece	1	4	4	9
5	Spain	1	0	0	1
6	France	0	2	2	4
7	Egypt	0	1	1	2
8	Lebanon	0	1	0	1
8	Morocco	0	1	0	1
10	Algeria	0	0	1	1
Totals (10 entries)		20	20	20	60

== Medalists ==
=== Men's freestyle ===
Event	Gold	Silver	Bronze
48 kg	Claudio Pollio; Italy	Ömer Sakızcı; Turkey	Mirko Dimčevski; Yugoslavia
52 kg	Koce Efremov; Yugoslavia	Muhammed Oruç; Turkey	Aldo Bova; Italy
57 kg	Risto Darlev; Yugoslavia	Antonio La Bruna; Italy	Diego Lo Brutto; France
62 kg	Nurettin Kurt; Turkey	Georgios Khatziioannidis; Greece	Šaip Bajrami; Yugoslavia
68 kg	Shaban Sejdiu; Yugoslavia	Didier Nicolas; France	Hüseyin Yalın; Turkey
74 kg	Kiro Ristov; Yugoslavia	Riccardo Niccolini; Italy	Osman Uzun; Turkey
82 kg	Şenol Tenekecioğlu; Turkey	Luciano Ortelli; Italy	Mohamed El-Ashram; Egypt
90 kg	Halil Aras; Turkey	Michele Azzola; Italy	Christophe Andanson; France
100 kg	Santiago Morales; Spain	Messias Vitsaras; Greece	Mehmet Donbay; Turkey
+100 kg	Hüseyin Çokal; Turkey	Hassan Bechara; Lebanon	Dimitris Spyridopoulos; Greece

=== Men's Greco-Roman ===
Event	Gold	Silver	Bronze
48 kg	Salih Bora; Turkey	Vincenzo Maenza; Italy	Sotiris Ventas; Greece
52 kg	Babis Kholidis; Greece	Slavko Skušek; Yugoslavia	Giuseppe Caltabiano; Italy
57 kg	Antonino Caltabiano; Italy	Ali Lachkar; Morocco	Mehmet Karadağ; Turkey
62 kg	Ivan Frgić; Yugoslavia	Stelios Mygiakis; Greece	Djamel Benaceur; Algeria
68 kg	Ferenc Čaba; Yugoslavia	Lionel Lacaze; France	Domenico Giuffrida; Italy
74 kg	Karolj Kasap; Yugoslavia	Erol Mutlu; Turkey	Feliciano Marotto; Italy
82 kg	Momir Petković; Yugoslavia	Mohamed El-Ashram; Egypt	Dimitrios Thanopoulos; Greece
90 kg	Darko Nišavić; Yugoslavia	Georgios Pozidis; Greece	Polat Aydın; Turkey
100 kg	Refik Memišević; Yugoslavia	Remo Ricciardelli; Italy	Georgios Poikilidis; Greece
+100 kg	Prvoslav Ilić; Yugoslavia	Kenan Ege; Turkey	Antonio La Penna; Italy
