= 1988 European Wrestling Championships =

- Host city: United Kingdom, Manchester(Freestyle); Norway Kolbotn(Greco-Roman); France
- Dates: 13 – 16 April 1988; 10 – 13 May 1988; 14 – 17 July 1988

Champions
- Freestyle: Soviet Union
- Greco-Roman: Soviet Union
- Women: France

The 1988 European Wrestling Championships were held in the men's Freestyle style in Manchester 13 – 16 April 1988; the Greco-Romane style in Kolbotn 10 – 13 May 1988; the women's Freestyle style in Dijon 14 – 17 July 1988.

== Medal table ==
Rank	Nation	Gold	Silver	Bronze	Total
1	Soviet Union	15	2	2	19
2	France	8	4	3	15
3	Bulgaria	2	4	8	14
4	Hungary	2	3	3	8
5	Norway	2	3	2	7
6	East Germany	0	2	2	4
7	Romania	0	2	0	2
7	Turkey	0	2	0	2
9	Finland	0	1	1	2
9	Yugoslavia	0	1	1	2
11	Belgium	0	1	0	1
11	Czechoslovakia	0	1	0	1
11	Denmark	0	1	0	1
11	Great Britain	0	1	0	1
15	Sweden	0	0	3	3
16	Netherlands	0	0	1	1
16	West Germany	0	0	1	1
Totals (17 entries)		29	28	27	84

== Medal summary ==
=== Men's freestyle ===
Event	Gold	Silver	Bronze
48 kg	Vasili Gogolev; Soviet Union	Romica Rașovan; Romania	Marian Nedkov; Bulgaria
52 kg	Valentin Yordanov; Bulgaria	Vladimir Toguzov; Soviet Union	Shaban Tërstena; Yugoslavia
57 kg	Sergei Beloglazov; Soviet Union	Ahmet Ak; Turkey	Stefan Ivanov; Bulgaria
62 kg	Stepan Sarkisyan; Soviet Union	Karsten Polky; East Germany	Simeon Shterev Sr. Bulgaria
68 kg	Arsen Fadzaev; Soviet Union	Attila Podolszki; Hungary	Bejshchet Selimov; Bulgaria
74 kg	Adlan Varayev; Soviet Union	Pekka Rauhala; Finland	Rahmat Sofiadi; Bulgaria
82 kg	Yuri Vorobiov; Soviet Union	Hans Gstöttner; East Germany	Aleksandar Nanev; Bulgaria
90 kg	Makharbek Khadartsev; Soviet Union	Mehmet Türkkaya; Turkey	Gábor Tóth; Hungary
100 kg	Leri Khabelov; Soviet Union	Noel Loban; Great Britain	Uwe Neupert; East Germany
130 kg	Aslan Khadartsev; Soviet Union	Atanas Atanasov; Bulgaria	Andreas Schröder; East Germany

=== Men's Greco-Roman ===
Event	Gold	Silver	Bronze
48 kg	Lars Rønningen; Norway	Sergey Suvorov; Soviet Union	Bratan Tsenov; Bulgaria
52 kg	Aleksandr Ignatenko; Soviet Union	Jon Rønningen; Norway	Valentin Krumov; Bulgaria
57 kg	Aleksandr Shestakov; Soviet Union	Stoyan Balov; Bulgaria	András Sike; Hungary
62 kg	Jenő Bódi; Hungary	Nencho Nenchev; Bulgaria	Arutik Rubenian; Soviet Union
68 kg	Attila Repka; Hungary	Petrică Cărare; Romania	Lars Lagerborg; Sweden
74 kg	Bisolt Detsiyev; Soviet Union	Jaroslav Zeman; Czechoslovakia	János Takács; Hungary
82 kg	Mikhail Mamiashvili; Soviet Union	Tibor Komáromi; Hungary	Timo Niemi; Finland
90 kg	Ivaylo Yordanov; Bulgaria	Sándor Major; Hungary	Pavel Potapov; Soviet Union
100 kg	Anatoli Fedorenko; Soviet Union	Jožef Tertei; Yugoslavia	Gerhard Himmel; West Germany
130 kg	Alexandr Karelin; Soviet Union	Krasimir Radoev; Bulgaria	Tomas Johansson; Sweden

=== Women's freestyle ===
Event	Gold	Silver	Bronze
44 kg	Valérie Delvaux; France	Brigitte Weigert; Belgium	Isabelle Poomarts; France
47 kg	Ferouzia Cheufri; France	Nadia Saïdi; France	Lynie van der Holst; Netherlands
50 kg	Martine Poupon; France	Anne Marie Halvorsen; Norway	Eve Joly; France
53 kg	Sylvie van Gucht; France	Sandrine Laroza; France	Thinka Bergh; Sweden
57 kg	Jocelyne Sagon; France	Isabelle Dourthe; France	Runi Rodal; Norway
61 kg	Brigitte Siffert; France	Christelle Rieu; France	Ine Barlie; Norway
65 kg	Heidi Kleven; Norway	Dörthe Pedersen; Denmark	Marie-Line Meurisse; France
70 kg	Georgette Jean; France	Kirsten Borgen; Norway	None Awarded
75 kg	Patricia Rossignol; France	None Awarded	None Awarded
