= Park Byung-hyo =

South Korean wrestler

Park Byung-Hyo (born 18 August 1962) is a Korean former wrestler who competed in the 1984 Summer Olympics under the 125.5 lbs Greco-Roman division, placing 8th overall.

== Olympics Performance ==
1984 Summer Olympics Matches
Round	Opponent	Country	Outcome
1	Mehmet Serhat Karadağ	Turkey	Defeat; 12-4
2	Patrick Mourier	France	Victory; 4-0
3	Niculae Zamfir	Romania	Defeat; 8-5
