= Zahedi =

Zahedi or Zahidi may refer to:

- Fazlollah Zahedi (1897–1963), Iranian general and prime minister
- Ardeshir Zahedi, Iranian foreign minister and ambassador
- Khojawahid Zahedi (born 1960), Afghan wrestler
- Nasser Zahedi, German physician and artist from Iran
- Caveh Zahedi, American film director
- Mahbub Jamal Zahedi, Khaleej Times and Dawn News editor
- Mohammad Reza Zahedi (1960–2024), Iranian senior military officer
- Sara Zahedi (born 1981), Swedish mathematician and refugee from Iran
- Shahab Zahedi, first Iranian footballer in Iceland
- The descendants of Sheikh Zahed Gilani (1216–1301)
- Zahidi (date), a cultivar of the date palm (Phoenix dactylifera)

== See also ==
- Zahediyeh, the Sufi Order founded by Zahed Gilani
