= Pavel Pavlov (wrestler) =

Bulgarian wrestler (born 1953)

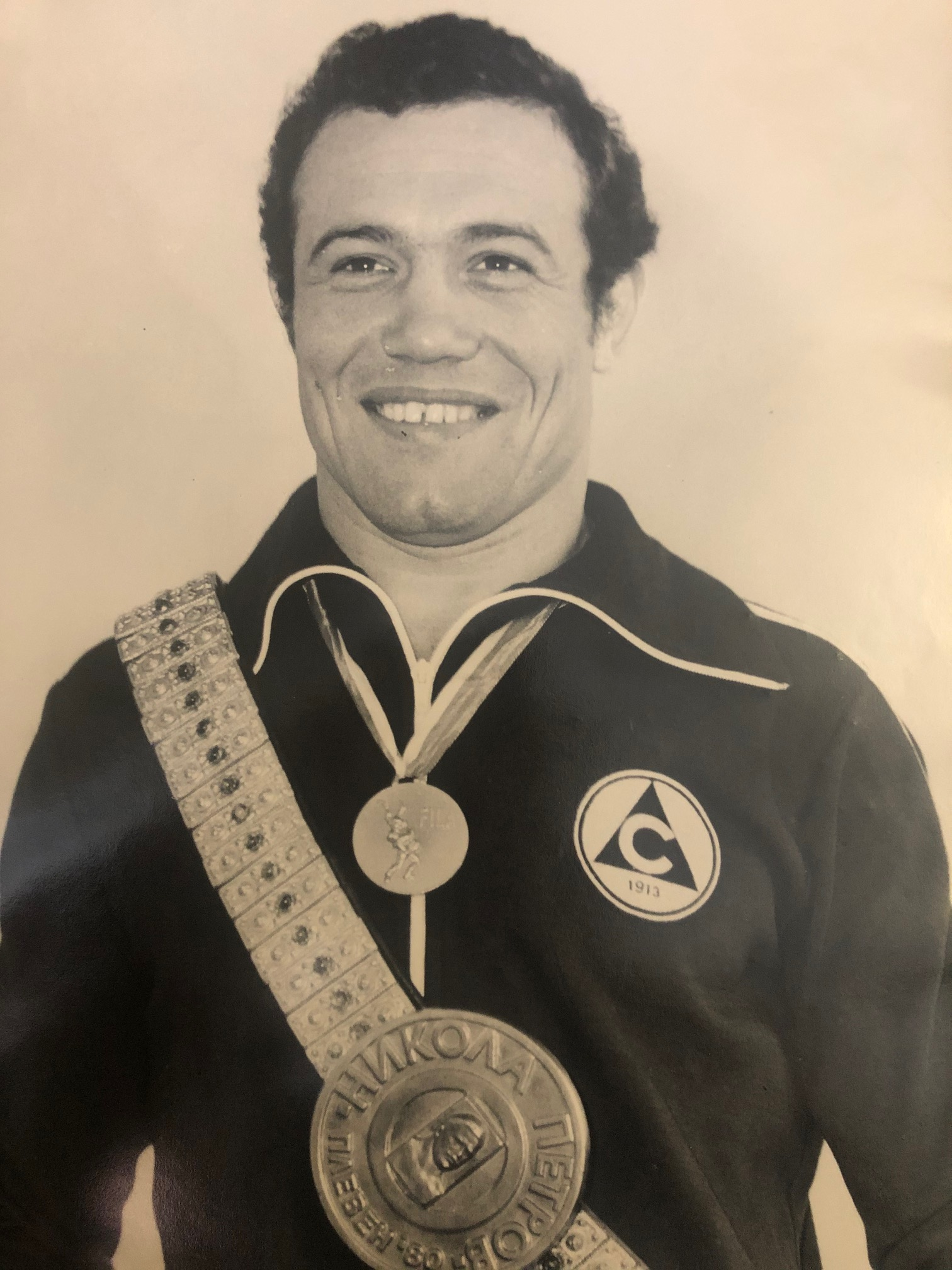

Medal record

Men's wrestling

Representing Bulgaria

Olympic Games
Bronze medal – third place	1980 Moscow	Greco-Roman 82 kg

FILA Wrestling World Championships
Bronze medal – third place	1979 San Diego	Greco-Roman 82 kg

Pavel Pavlov Strakhilov (Bulgarian: Павел Павлов Страхилов) (born 9 June 1953 in Kostinbrod) is a former Bulgarian Greco-Roman wrestler who competed in the middleweight (82 kg) category.

His international career lasted from 1976 to 1981. He was third at the Grand Prix of Germany competition in 1976 and went on to finish fifth in his class in 1977 World Wrestling Championships. On his second world-level appearance at the 1979 edition in San Diego, he managed to win the bronze medal. He had the same placing at the German Grand Prix the following year.

His greatest achievement was winning the 82 kg Greco-Roman bronze medal for Bulgaria at the 1980 Moscow Olympics, as he reached the final round but was defeated by both Jan Dołgowicz and Gennadi Korban. He won two more medals of that colour for his country at the 1980 and 1981 European Wrestling Championships.
