= 1982 World Wrestling Championships =

Freestyle
- Host city: Edmonton, Canada
- Dates: 12–14 August 1982

Greco-Roman
- Host city: Katowice, Poland
- Dates: 9–12 September 1982

Champions
- Freestyle: Soviet Union
- Greco-Roman: Soviet Union

The following is the final results of the 1982 World Wrestling Championships. Freestyle competition were held in Edmonton, Alberta, Canada and Greco-Roman competition were held in Katowice, Poland.

== Medal table ==
Rank	Nation	Gold	Silver	Bronze	Total
1	Soviet Union	11	2	4	17
2	Poland	3	2	1	6
3	East Germany	2	0	2	4
4	Bulgaria	1	6	4	11
5	Romania	1	3	1	5
6	United States	1	0	3	4
7	Sweden	1	0	0	1
8	Yugoslavia	0	1	2	3
9	Cuba	0	1	1	2
9	Hungary	0	1	1	2
11	Canada	0	1	0	1
11	Czechoslovakia	0	1	0	1
11	Japan	0	1	0	1
11	Turkey	0	1	0	1
15	South Korea	0	0	1	1
Totals (15 entries)		20	20	20	60

== Team ranking ==
Rank	Men's freestyle		Men's Greco-Roman	
Rank	Team	Points	Team	Points
1	Soviet Union	55	Soviet Union	46
2	United States	28	Poland	31
3	Bulgaria	25	Romania	30
4	East Germany	23	Bulgaria	30
5	Japan	12	Yugoslavia	17
6	Iran	12	Hungary	13

== Medal summary ==
=== Freestyle ===
Event	Gold	Silver	Bronze
48 kg	Sergey Kornilaev; Soviet Union	Ali Mehmedov; Bulgaria	Šaban Trstena; Yugoslavia
52 kg	Hartmut Reich; East Germany	Osman Efendiev; Soviet Union	Joe Gonzales; United States
57 kg	Anatoly Beloglazov; Soviet Union	Hideaki Tomiyama; Japan	Stefan Ivanov; Bulgaria
62 kg	Sergey Beloglazov; Soviet Union	Simeon Shterev; Bulgaria	József Orbán; Hungary
68 kg	Mikhail Kharachura; Soviet Union	Raúl Cascaret; Cuba	Eberhard Probst; East Germany
74 kg	Leroy Kemp; United States	Dan Karabin; Czechoslovakia	Yury Vorobiev; Soviet Union
82 kg	Taymuraz Dzgoev; Soviet Union	Efraim Kamberov; Bulgaria	Dave Schultz; United States
90 kg	Uwe Neupert; East Germany	Clark Davis; Canada	Vladimir Batnia; Soviet Union
100 kg	Ilya Mate; Soviet Union	Slavcho Chervenkov; Bulgaria	Greg Gibson; United States
+100 kg	Salman Khasimikov; Soviet Union	Adam Sandurski; Poland	Andreas Schröder; East Germany

=== Greco-Roman ===
Event	Gold	Silver	Bronze
48 kg	Temo Kasarashvili; Soviet Union	Salih Bora; Turkey	Bratan Tsenov; Bulgaria
52 kg	Benur Pashayan; Soviet Union	Lyubomir Tsekov; Bulgaria	Bang Dae-du; South Korea
57 kg	Piotr Michalik; Poland	Nicolae Zamfir; Romania	Vasily Fomin; Soviet Union
62 kg	Ryszard Świerad; Poland	Roman Nasibulov; Soviet Union	Panayot Kirov; Bulgaria
68 kg	Gennady Ermilov; Soviet Union	István Péter; Hungary	Ștefan Negrișan; Romania
74 kg	Ștefan Rusu; Romania	Andrzej Supron; Poland	Karolj Kasap; Yugoslavia
82 kg	Taymuraz Apkhazava; Soviet Union	Ion Draica; Romania	Jan Dołgowicz; Poland
90 kg	Frank Andersson; Sweden	Atanas Komchev; Bulgaria	Igor Kanygin; Soviet Union
100 kg	Roman Wrocławski; Poland	Vasile Andrei; Romania	Andrey Dimitrov; Bulgaria
+100 kg	Nikola Dinev; Bulgaria	Refik Memišević; Yugoslavia	Cándido Mesa; Cuba
