= Wrestling at the 1988 Summer Olympics – Men's Greco-Roman 57 kg =

Men's Greco-Roman 57 kg at the Games of the XXIV Olympiad
- Venue: Sangmu Gymnasium
- Dates: 20–22 September 1988
- Competitors: 20 from 20 nations

Medalists
1st place, gold medalist(s)		András Sike	Hungary
2nd place, silver medalist(s)		Stoyan Balov	Bulgaria
3rd place, bronze medalist(s)		Haralambos Holidis	Greece

The Men's Greco-Roman 57 kg at the 1988 Summer Olympics as part of the wrestling program were held at the Sangmu Gymnasium, Seongnam.

== Tournament results ==
The wrestlers are divided into 2 groups. The winner of each group decided by a double-elimination system.

Legend

- TF — Won by Fall
- SP — Won by Superiority, 12-14 points difference, the loser with points
- SO — Won by Superiority, 12-14 points difference, the loser without points
- ST — Won by Technical Superiority, 15 points difference
- PP — Won by Points, the loser with technical points
- PO — Won by Points, the loser without technical points
- P0 — Won by Passivity, scoring zero points
- P1 — Won by Passivity, while leading by 1-11 points
- PS — Won by Passivity, while leading by 12-14 points
- PA — Won by Opponent Injury
- DQ — Won by Forfeit
- DNA — Did not appear
- L — Losses
- ER — Round of Elimination
- CP — Classification Points
- TP — Technical Points

=== Eliminatory round ===
==== Group A ====
L		CP	TP		L
Round 1
1	Anthony Amado (USA)	0-3 P1	6:42	Heo Byeong-ho (KOR)	0
0	Ronny Sigde (NOR)	4-0 TF	1:36	Ahad Pazaj (IRI)	1
1	Aleksandr Shestakov (URS)	0-3 P1	5:07	Haralambos Holidis (GRE)	0
0	Benni Ljungbeck (SWE)	3-0 PO	5-0	Keijo Pehkonen (FIN)	1
1	Zoran Galović (YUG)	0-4 ST	0-16	Stoyan Balov (BUL)	0
0	Kacem Bouallouche (MAR)			Bye	
Round 2
1	Kacem Bouallouche (MAR)	0-4 TF	1:05	Anthony Amado (USA)	1
0	Huh Byung-Ho (KOR)	4-0 ST	19-0	Ronny Sigde (NOR)	1
2	Ahad Pazaj (IRI)	0-4 ST	0-15	Alexander Chestakov (URS)	1
0	Haralambos Holidis (GRE)	3-0 P1	5:22	Benni Ljungbeck (SWE)	1
1	Keijo Pehkonen (FIN)	3-1 PP	6-1	Zoran Galović (YUG)	2
0	Stoyan Balov (BUL)			Bye	
Round 3
0	Stoyan Balov (BUL)	4-0 ST	16-0	Kacem Bouallouche (MAR)	2
1	Anthony Amado (USA)	3-1 PP	10-7	Ronny Sigde (NOR)	2
1	Huh Byung-Ho (KOR)	1-3 PP	4-7	Haralambos Holidis (GRE)	0
1	Alexander Chestakov (URS)	3-0 P1	3:43	Benni Ljungbeck (SWE)	2
1	Keijo Pehkonen (FIN)			Bye	
Round 4
2	Keijo Pehkonen (FIN)	1-3 PP	2-3	Stoyan Balov (BUL)	0
2	Anthony Amado (USA)	0-4 TF	2:49	Haralambos Holidis (GRE)	0
1	Huh Byung-Ho (KOR)	3-1 PP	10-9	Alexander Chestakov (URS)	2
Round 5
0	Stoyan Balov (BUL)	3-1 PP	5-2	Huh Byung-Ho (KOR)	2
0	Haralambos Holidis (GRE)			Bye	
Round 6
1	Haralambos Holidis (GRE)	0-3 PO	0-8	Stoyan Balov (BUL)	0

Wrestler	L	ER	CP
Stoyan Balov (BUL)	0	-	17
Haralambos Holidis (GRE)	1	-	13
Huh Byung-Ho (KOR)	2	5	12
Alexander Chestakov (URS)	2	4	8
Anthony Amado (USA)	2	4	7
Keijo Pehkonen (FIN)	2	4	4
Ronny Sigde (NOR)	2	3	5
Benni Ljungbeck (SWE)	2	3	3
Kacem Bouallouche (MAR)	2	3	0
Zoran Galović (YUG)	2	2	1
Ahad Pazaj (IRI)	2	2	0

==== Group B ====
L		CP	TP		L
Round 1
0	András Sike (HUN)	3-0 PO	6-0	Shunji Nakadome (JPN)	1
0	Yang Changcen (CHN)	3-1 PP	3-2	Ryszard Wolny (POL)	1
1	Ramón Meña (PAN)	1-3 PP	2-13	Patrice Mourier (FRA)	0
0	Rifat Yildiz (FRG)	3.5-0 SO	12-0	Mehdi Chaambi (TUN)	1
0	Ghazi Salah (IRQ)	3-1 PP	15-8	Adrian Ponce (MEX)	1
Round 2
0	András Sike (HUN)	4-0 TF	5:41	Yang Changling (CHN)	1
1	Shunji Nakadome (JPN)	3.5-.5 SP	14-1	Ryszard Wolny (POL)	2
2	Ramón Meña (PAN)	0-4 ST	0-16	Rifat Yildiz (FRG)	0
1	Patrice Mourier (FRA)	0-4 PA	1:13	Ghazi Salah (IRQ)	0
1	Mehdi Chaambi (TUN)	4-0 ST	15-0	Adrian Ponce (MEX)	2
Round 3
0	András Sike (HUN)	3-0 P1	5:30	Rifat Yildiz (FRG)	1
2	Shunji Nakadome (JPN)	1-3 PP	8-11	Yang Changling (CHN)	1
0	Ghazi Salah (IRQ)			Bye	
1	Patrice Mourier (FRA)			DNA	
1	Mehdi Chaambi (TUN)			DNA	
Round 4
1	Ghazi Salah (IRQ)	0-4 ST	0-16	András Sike (HUN)	0
1	Yang Changling (CHN)	3-1 PP	8-5	Rifat Yildiz (FRG)	2
Round 5
2	Ghazi Salah (IRQ)	1-3 PP	2-10	Yang Changling (CHN)	1
0	András Sike (HUN)			Bye	

Wrestler	L	ER	CP
András Sike (HUN)	0	-	14
Yang Changling (CHN)	1	-	12
Ghazi Salah (IRQ)	2	5	8
Rifat Yildiz (FRG)	2	4	8.5
Shunji Nakadome (JPN)	2	3	4.5
Mehdi Chaambi (TUN)	1	2	4
Patrice Mourier (FRA)	1	2	3
Ryszard Wolny (POL)	2	2	1.5
Adrian Ponce (MEX)	2	2	1
Ramón Meña (PAN)	2	2	1

=== Final round ===
	CP	TP	
7th place match
Alexander Chestakov (URS)	4-0 DQ		Rifat Yildiz (FRG)
5th place match
Huh Byung-Ho (KOR)	4-0 TF	1:44	Ghazi Salah (IRQ)
Bronze medal match
Haralambos Holidis (GRE)	3-1 PP	6-1	Yang Changling (CHN)
Gold medal match
Stoyan Balov (BUL)	0-4 PA	3:38	András Sike (HUN)

== Final standings ==
1. András Sike (HUN)
2. Stoyan Balov (BUL)
3. Haralambos Holidis (GRE)
4. Yang Changling (CHN)
5. Huh Byung-Ho (KOR)
6. Ghazi Salah (IRQ)
7. Alexander Chestakov (URS)
