= Santiago Morales =

Santiago Morales may refer to:

- Santiago Morales (wrestler) (1951-2005), Spanish wrestler
- Santiago Morales (soccer) (born 2007), American soccer player
