= Ibrahim Juma =

Ibrahim Juma may refer to:

- Ibrahim Juma (runner) (born 1958), Tanzanian long-distance runner
- Ibrahim Juma (footballer) (born 1993), Ugandan football midfielder
- Ibrahim Khalil Juma (born 1957), Iraqi wrestler
