= Wrestling at the 1984 Summer Olympics =

Wrestling at the Games of the XXIII Olympiad
- Venue: Anaheim Convention Center
- Dates: 30 July – 11 August
- Competitors: 267 from 44 nations

At the 1984 Summer Olympics, 20 wrestling events were contested. There were 10 weight classes in each of the freestyle wrestling and Greco-Roman wrestling disciplines. Competition took place at the arena at the Anaheim Convention Center in Anaheim, California.

== Medal summary ==
=== Freestyle ===
Games	Gold	Silver	Bronze
48 kg	Bobby Weaver; United States	Takashi Irie; Japan	Son Gab-Do; South Korea
52 kg	Šaban Trstena; Yugoslavia	Kim Jong-kyu; South Korea	Yuji Takada; Japan
57 kg	Hideaki Tomiyama; Japan	Barry Davis; United States	Kim Eui-Kon; South Korea
62 kg	Randall Lewis; United States	Kosei Akaishi; Japan	Lee Jung-Keun; South Korea
68 kg	You In-Tak; South Korea	Andrew Rein; United States	Jukka Rauhala; Finland
74 kg	Dave Schultz; United States	Martin Knosp; West Germany	Šaban Sejdiu; Yugoslavia
82 kg	Mark Schultz; United States	Hideyuki Nagashima; Japan	Christopher Rinke; Canada
90 kg	Ed Banach; United States	Akira Ota; Japan	Noel Loban; Great Britain
100 kg	Lou Banach; United States	Joseph Atiyeh; Syria	Vasile Pușcașu; Romania
+100 kg	Bruce Baumgartner; United States	Robert Molle; Canada	Ayhan Taşkin; Turkey

=== Greco-Roman ===
Games	Gold	Silver	Bronze
48 kg	Vincenzo Maenza; Italy	Markus Scherer; West Germany	Ikuzo Saito; Japan
52 kg	Atsuji Miyahara; Japan	Daniel Aceves; Mexico	Bang Dae-Du; South Korea
57 kg	Pasquale Passarelli; West Germany	Masaki Eto; Japan	Charalambos Cholidis; Greece
62 kg	Kim Weon-Kee; South Korea	Kent-Olle Johansson; Sweden	Hugo Dietsche; Switzerland
68 kg	Vlado Lisjak; Yugoslavia	Tapio Sipilä; Finland	James Martinez; United States
74 kg	Jouko Salomäki; Finland	Roger Tallroth; Sweden	Ștefan Rusu; Romania
82 kg	Ion Draica; Romania	Dimitrios Thanopoulos; Greece	Sören Claeson; Sweden
90 kg	Steve Fraser; United States	Ilie Matei; Romania	Frank Andersson; Sweden
100 kg	Vasile Andrei; Romania	Greg Gibson; United States	Jožef Tertei; Yugoslavia
+100 kg	Jeff Blatnick; United States	Refik Memišević; Yugoslavia	Victor Dolipschi; Romania

== Medal table ==
Rank	Nation	Gold	Silver	Bronze	Total
1	United States	9	3	1	13
2	Japan	2	5	2	9
3	South Korea	2	1	4	7
4	Romania	2	1	3	6
5	Yugoslavia	2	1	2	5
6	West Germany	1	2	0	3
7	Finland	1	1	1	3
8	Italy	1	0	0	1
9	Sweden	0	2	2	4
10	Canada	0	1	1	2
10	Greece	0	1	1	2
12	Mexico	0	1	0	1
12	Syria	0	1	0	1
14	Great Britain	0	0	1	1
14	Switzerland	0	0	1	1
14	Turkey	0	0	1	1
Totals (16 entries)		20	20	20	60

== Participating nations ==
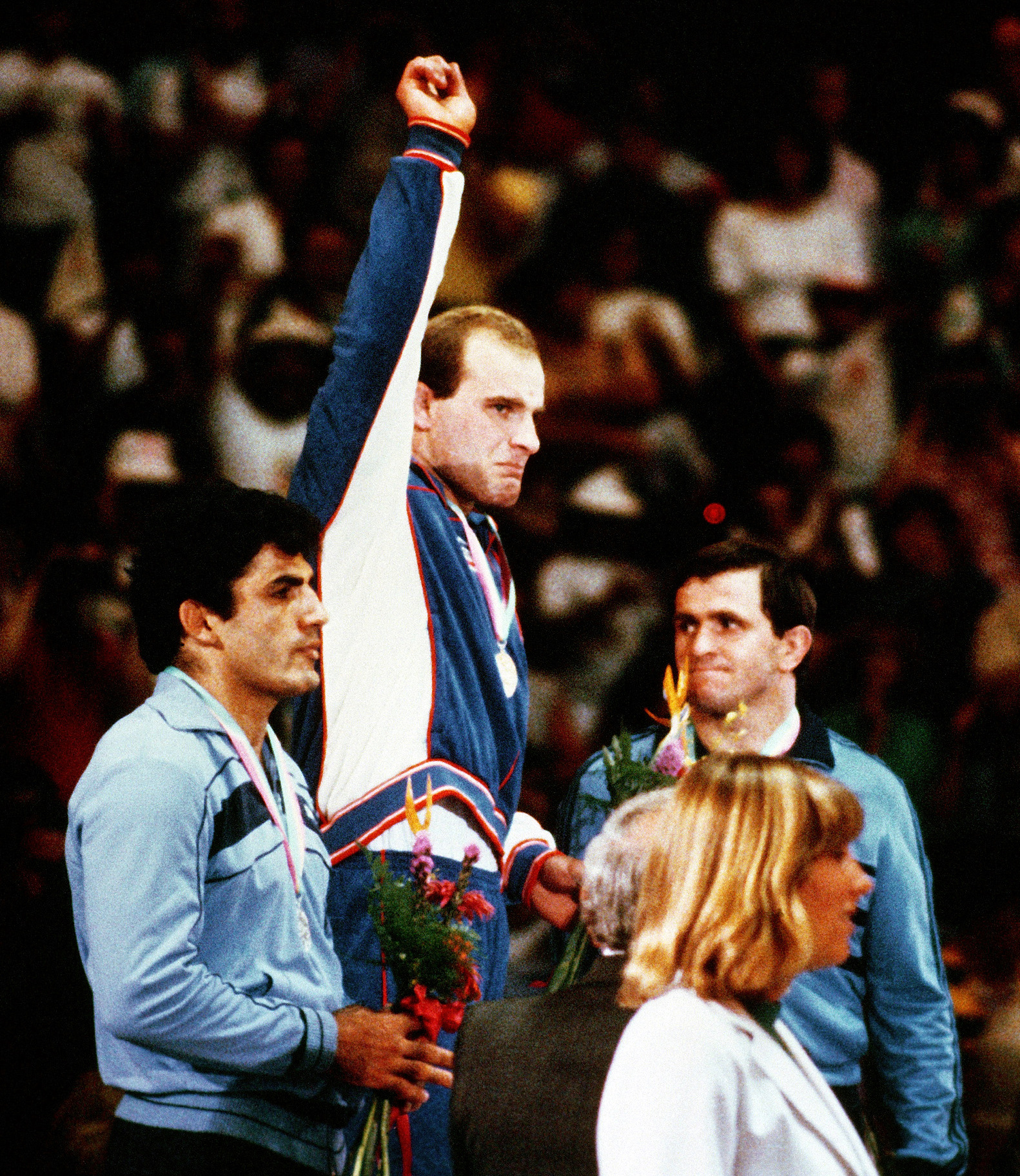
Wrestlers greet the crowd at a medal ceremony.

A total of 267 wrestlers from 44 nations competed at the Los Angeles Games:

- Argentina (3)
- Australia (3)
- Austria (7)
- Bolivia (1)
- Cameroon (5)
- Canada (13)
- China (7)
- Chinese Taipei (1)
- Colombia (1)
- Dominican Republic (1)
- Ecuador (1)
- Egypt (10)
- El Salvador (1)
- Finland (11)
- France (8)
- Great Britain (7)
- Greece (10)
- India (8)
- Iraq (3)
- Italy (7)
- Japan (20)
- Lebanon (1)
- Malta (2)
- Mauritania (2)
- Mexico (5)
- Morocco (5)
- New Zealand (3)
- Nigeria (3)
- Norway (5)
- Pakistan (2)
- Panama (1)
- Peru (2)
- Puerto Rico (3)
- Romania (10)
- Senegal (4)
- South Korea (14)
- Spain (3)
- Sweden (11)
- Switzerland (2)
- Syria (3)
- Turkey (16)
- United States (19)
- West Germany (14)
- Yugoslavia (9)

== See also ==
- Wrestling at the Friendship Games

== Sources ==
- "Olympic Medal Winners". International Olympic Committee.
