= Wrestling at the 1980 Summer Olympics – Men's freestyle 100 kg =

Men's freestyle 100 kg at the Games of the XXII Olympiad
- Venue: Central Sports Club of the Army
- Dates: 28–30 July 1980
- Competitors: 15 from 15 nations

Medalists
1st place, gold medalist(s)		Illya Mate	Soviet Union
2nd place, silver medalist(s)		Slavcho Chervenkov	Bulgaria
3rd place, bronze medalist(s)		Július Strnisko	Czechoslovakia

The Men's Freestyle 100 kg at the 1980 Summer Olympics as part of the wrestling program were held at the Athletics Fieldhouse, Central Sports Club of the Army.

== Medalists ==
Gold	Illya Mate; Soviet Union
Silver	Slavcho Chervenkov; Bulgaria
Bronze	Július Strnisko; Czechoslovakia

== Tournament results ==
The competition used a form of negative points tournament, with negative points given for any result short of a fall. Accumulation of 6 negative points eliminated the loser wrestler. When only three wrestlers remain, a special final round is used to determine the order of the medals.

Legend

- TF — Won by Fall
- IN — Won by Opponent Injury
- DQ — Won by Passivity
- D1 — Won by Passivity, the winner is passive too
- D2 — Both wrestlers lost by Passivity
- FF — Won by Forfeit
- DNA — Did not appear
- TPP — Total penalty points
- MPP — Match penalty points

Penalties

- 0 — Won by Fall, Technical Superiority, Passivity, Injury and Forfeit
- 0.5 — Won by Points, 8-11 points difference
- 1 — Won by Points, 1-7 points difference
- 2 — Won by Passivity, the winner is passive too
- 3 — Lost by Points, 1-7 points difference
- 3.5 — Lost by Points, 8-11 points difference
- 4 — Lost by Fall, Technical Superiority, Passivity, Injury and Forfeit

=== Round 1 ===
TPP	MPP		Score		MPP	TPP
4	4	Satpal Singh (IND)	TF / 4:28	Július Strnisko (TCH)	0	0
4	4	Saleh El-Said (SYR)	TF / 3:45	Harald Büttner (GDR)	0	0
0	0	Vasile Puşcaşu (ROU)	IN / 6:46	Frank Andersson (SWE)	4	4
0	0	Bárbaro Morgan (CUB)	TF / 2:46	Khorloogiin Bayanmönkh (MGL)	4	4
0	0	Ilya Mate (URS)	TF / 3:42	Santiago Morales (ESP)	4	4
4	4	Bourcard Binelli (CMR)	TF / 1:22	Ambroise Sarr (SEN)	0	0
0	0	Slavcho Chervenkov (BUL)	DQ / 6:42	Antal Bodó (HUN)	4	4
0		Tomasz Busse (POL)		Bye		

=== Round 2 ===
TPP	MPP		Score		MPP	TPP
0	0	Tomasz Busse (POL)	18 - 3	Satpal Singh (IND)	4	8
0	0	Július Strnisko (TCH)	TF / 0:48	Saleh El-Said (SYR)	4	8
1	1	Harald Büttner (GDR)	6 - 5	Vasile Puşcaşu (ROU)	3	3
4	4	Bárbaro Morgan (CUB)	DQ / 7:02	Ilya Mate (URS)	0	0
4	0	Khorloogiin Bayanmönkh (MGL)	TF / 2:42	Santiago Morales (ESP)	4	8
8	4	Bourcard Bineli (CMR)	TF / 1:14	Slavcho Chervenkov (BUL)	0	0
4	4	Ambroise Sarr (SEN)	DQ / 5:11	Antal Bodó (HUN)	0	4
4		Frank Andersson (SWE)		DNA		

=== Round 3 ===
TPP	MPP		Score		MPP	TPP
1	1	Tomasz Busse (POL)	10 - 6	Július Strnisko (TCH)	3	3
1.5	0.5	Harald Büttner (GDR)	11 - 3	Bárbaro Morgan (CUB)	3.5	7.5
3	0	Vasile Puşcaşu (ROU)	TF / 2:26	Khorloogiin Bayanmönkh (MGL)	4	8
0	0	Ilya Mate (URS)	TF / 1:41	Antal Bodó (HUN)	4	8
8	4	Ambroise Sarr (SEN)	TF / 1:08	Slavcho Chervenkov (BUL)	0	0

=== Round 4 ===
TPP	MPP		Score		MPP	TPP
4	3	Tomasz Busse (POL)	4 - 4	Harald Büttner (GDR)	1	2.5
4	1	Július Strnisko (TCH)	8 - 7	Vasile Puşcaşu (ROU)	3	6
1	1	Ilya Mate (URS)	6 - 4	Slavcho Chervenkov (BUL)	3	3

=== Round 5 ===
TPP	MPP		Score		MPP	TPP
7	3	Tomasz Busse (POL)	2 - 9	Ilya Mate (URS)	1	2
4	0	Július Strnisko (TCH)	DQ / 8:21	Harald Büttner (GDR)	4	6.5
3		Slavcho Chervenkov (BUL)		Bye		

=== Final ===
Results from the preliminary round are carried forward into the final (shown in yellow).

TPP	MPP		Score		MPP	TPP
	1	Ilya Mate (URS)	6 - 4	Slavcho Chervenkov (BUL)	3	
3.5	0.5	Slavcho Chervenkov (BUL)	11 - 3	Július Strnisko (TCH)	3.5	
1	0	Ilya Mate (URS)	15 - 3	Július Strnisko (TCH)	4	7.5

== Final standings ==
1. Ilya Mate (URS)
2. Slavcho Chervenkov (BUL)
3. Július Strnisko (TCH)
4. Harald Büttner (GDR)
5. Tomasz Busse (POL)
6. Vasile Puşcaşu (ROU)
7. Bárbaro Morgan (CUB)
8. Khorloogiin Bayanmönkh (MGL)
