= Abdel Latif Khalaf =

Egyptian wrestler

Personal information
- Nationality: Egyptian
- Born: 2 January 1966 (age 60)

Sport
- Sport: Wrestling

Abdel Latif Khalaf (born 2 January 1966) is an Egyptian wrestler. He competed in the men's Greco-Roman 57 kg at the 1984 Summer Olympics.
