= Mehdi Chaambi =

Tunisian wrestler

Personal information
- Nationality: Tunisian
- Born: 28 May 1965 (age 61)

Sport
- Sport: Wrestling

Mehdi Chaambi (born 28 May 1965) is a Tunisian wrestler. He competed in the men's Greco-Roman 57 kg at the 1988 Summer Olympics.
