= Kacem Bouallouche =

Moroccan wrestler

Personal information
- Nationality: Moroccan
- Born: 20 September 1963 (age 62)

Sport
- Sport: Wrestling

Kacem Bouallouche (born 20 September 1963) is a Moroccan wrestler. He competed in the men's Greco-Roman 57 kg at the 1988 Summer Olympics.
