= Fernando San Isidro =

Spanish wrestler

Personal information
- Nationality: Spanish
- Born: 8 March 1951 (age 75)

Sport
- Sport: Wrestling

Fernando San Isidro (born 8 March 1951) is a Spanish wrestler. He competed in the men's Greco-Roman 82 kg at the 1980 Summer Olympics.
