= Bourcard Binelli =

Cameroonian wrestler (born 1958)

Personal information
- Nationality: Cameroonian
- Born: 19 January 1958 (age 68)

Sport
- Sport: Wrestling

Bourcard Binelli (born 19 January 1958) is a Cameroonian wrestler. He competed in the men's freestyle 100 kg at the 1980 Summer Olympics.
