= Shunji Nakadome =

Japanese wrestler (born 1964)

Personal information
- Full name: 中留俊司 Nakadome Shunji
- Nationality: Japanese
- Born: 17 August 1964 (age 61)

Sport
- Sport: Wrestling

Shunji Nakadome (born 17 August 1964) is a Japanese wrestler. He competed in the men's Greco-Roman 57 kg at the 1988 Summer Olympics.
