= Adrian Ponce =

Mexican wrestler

Personal information
- Nationality: Mexican
- Born: 25 September 1961 (age 65)

Sport
- Sport: Wrestling

Adrian Ponce (born 25 September 1961) is a Mexican wrestler. He competed in the men's Greco-Roman 57 kg at the 1988 Summer Olympics.
