= Wrestling at the 1975 Mediterranean Games =

Wrestling competition

- Dates: September 1975

The wrestling tournament at the 1975 Mediterranean Games was held in Algiers, Algeria.

== Medal table ==
* Host nation (Algeria)

Rank	Nation	Gold	Silver	Bronze	Total
1	Turkey	11	4	2	17
2	Yugoslavia	4	3	3	10
3	France	2	1	3	6
4	Greece	1	6	1	8
5	Italy	1	2	3	6
6	Syria	1	0	5	6
7	Egypt	0	3	0	3
8	Morocco	0	1	0	1
9	Lebanon	0	0	1	1
9	Libya	0	0	1	1
9	Spain	0	0	1	1
Totals (11 entries)		20	20	20	60

== Medalists ==
=== Men's freestyle ===
Event	Gold	Silver	Bronze
48 kg	Mehmet Cambaz; Turkey	Claudio Pollio; Italy	Mohamed Nahlaoui; Syria
52 kg	Diego Lo Brutto; France	Babis Kholidis; Greece	Fehmi San; Turkey
57 kg	Mehmet Emin Şimşek; Turkey	Georgios Khatziioannidis; Greece	Risto Darlev; Yugoslavia
62 kg	Shaban Sejdiu; Yugoslavia	Panagiotis Koutsoupakis; Greece	Théodule Toulotte; France
68 kg	Mehmet Sarı; Turkey	Stefanos Ioannidis; Greece	Ace Jordanov; Yugoslavia
74 kg	Servet Aydemir; Turkey	Kiro Ristov; Yugoslavia	Giuseppe Spagnoli; Italy
82 kg	Mehmet Uzun; Turkey	André Bouchoule; France	Iordanis Karageorgiou; Greece
90 kg	Michel Grangier; France	Ayhan Taşkın; Turkey	Atef Mahayri; Syria
100 kg	Mehmet Güçlü; Turkey	Dimitrios Spirydopoulos; Greece	Youssef Diba; Syria
+100 kg	Kenan Ege; Turkey	Lofti Amira Mahmoud; Egypt	Youssef Saddick; Syria

=== Men's Greco-Roman ===
Event	Gold	Silver	Bronze
48 kg	Salih Bora; Turkey	Mohamed El-Malky; Egypt	Vicente Sánchez; Spain
52 kg	Babis Kholidis; Greece	Antonino Caltabiano; Italy	Soubaia; Syria
57 kg	Ivan Frgić; Yugoslavia	Ali Lachkar; Morocco	Agostino di Mauro; Italy
62 kg	Erdoğan Koçak; Turkey	Stelios Mygiakis; Greece	Domenico Giuffrida; Italy
68 kg	Sreten Damjanović; Yugoslavia	Mustafa al-Fiki; Egypt	Erol Mutlu; Turkey
74 kg	Gian Matteo Ranzi; Italy	Murat Toklu; Turkey	Vojislav Tabački; Yugoslavia
82 kg	Momir Petković; Yugoslavia	Ömer Suzan; Turkey	André Bouchoule; France
90 kg	Aslan Islan; Turkey	Darko Nišavić; Yugoslavia	Michel Grangier; France
100 kg	Moharem; Syria	Mehmet Güçlü; Turkey	Ahmed Ahmida; Libya
+100 kg	Ömer Topuz; Turkey	Karolj Danji; Yugoslavia	Hassan Bechara; Lebanon
