= Servio Severino =

Dominican wrestler

Personal information
- Nationality: Dominican

Sport
- Sport: Wrestling

Servio Severino (born 2 January 1966) is a Dominican Republic wrestler. He competed in two events at the 1984 Summer Olympics.
