= Oleg Alekseev =

Soviet wrestler

Medal record

Men's wrestling

Representing Soviet Union

Europe championship
Gold medal – first place	1979 Bucharest	82 kg

Oleg Aleksandrovich Alekseev (Russian:Олег Александрович Алексеев) (27 March 1953 – 30 July 2015) was a Soviet wrestler. An ethnic Buryat, he engaged in wrestling as a child under influence from his elder brother Vyacheslav, and progressed through national competitions. He became the first Buryat to become an Honoured Masters of Sport of the USSR. He won the gold medal at the 1979 European Wrestling Championships in Bucharest. With the Soviet Union team, the team World Cup in Toledo, US 1979.

Towards the end of his sports career he worked as a coach.
