= Jiichiro Date =

Japanese freestyle wrestler

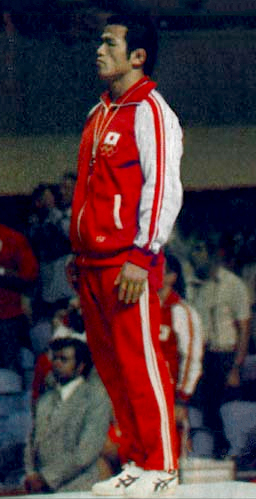
- Date at the 1976 Olympics

Personal information
- Born: 6 January 1952 Oita Prefecture, Japan
- Died: 2 February 2018 (aged 66)
- Height: 172 cm (5 ft 8 in)

Sport
- Sport: Freestyle wrestling
Medal record
Men's freestyle wrestling
Representing Japan
Olympic Games
Gold medal – first place	1976 Montreal	74 kg
World Championships
Bronze medal – third place	1975 Minsk	74 kg
World Cup
Gold medal – first place	1973 Toledo	74 kg

Jiichiro Date (伊達 治一郎, Date Jiichiro; January 6, 1952 – 20 February 2018) was a Japanese freestyle wrestler. He won the world cup in 1973 and an Olympic gold medal in 1976 and placed third at the 1975 World Championships.

On February 20, 2018, he fell from his apartment in Chofu, Tokyo, and died. He was 66 years old.
