= Ivan David (wrestler) =

United States Virgin Islands wrestler

Personal information
- Born: April 2, 1945 (age 81)

Sport
- Sport: Wrestling

Ivan David (born April 2, 1945) is a wrestler who represents the United States Virgin Islands. He competed in the men's freestyle 74 kg at the 1976 Summer Olympics.
