= Rudolf Marro =

Swiss wrestler

Personal information
- Nationality: Swiss
- Born: 15 August 1953 (age 72) Plaffeien, Switzerland

Sport
- Sport: Wrestling

Rudolf Marro (born 15 August 1953) is a Swiss wrestler. He competed in the men's freestyle 74 kg at the 1980 Summer Olympics.
