= Bani Merje Fawaz =

Syrian wrestler (born 1950)

Personal information
- Nationality: Syrian
- Born: 9 February 1950 (age 76)

Sport
- Sport: Wrestling

Bani Merje Fawaz (born 9 February 1950) is a Syrian wrestler. He competed in the men's freestyle 74 kg at the 1980 Summer Olympics, losing both his matches.
