= Jamtsyn Davaajav =

Mongolian wrestler (1953–2000)

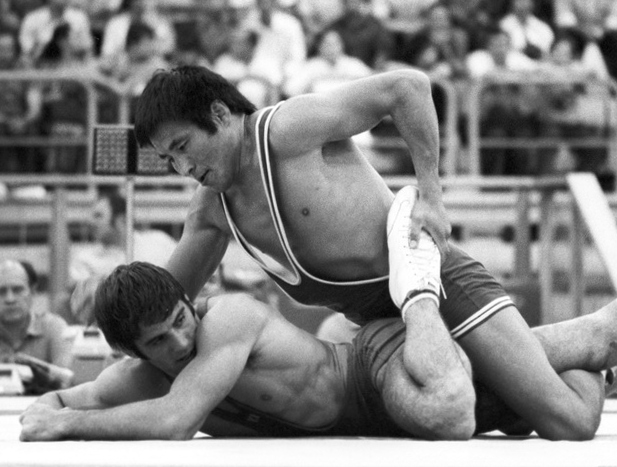
- Davaajav (top) at the 1980 Olympics

Personal information
- Nationality: Mongolia
- Born: 28 June 1953 Bulgan, Mongolian People’s Republic
- Died: 2000 (aged 46–47)
- Height: 165 cm (5 ft 5 in)

Sport
- Country: Mongolia
- Sport: Freestyle wrestling
- Weight class: 74 kg
Medal record
Representing Mongolia
Men's Freestyle wrestling
Olympic Games
Silver medal – second place	1980 Moscow	-74 kg
Asian Games
Bronze medal – third place	1978 Bangkok	-74 kg
World University Games
Bronze medal – third place	1977 Sofia	74 kg

Jamtsyn Davaajav (Mongolian: Жамцын Даваажав; 28 June 1953 – 2000) was a Mongolian welterweight wrestler. He competed at the 1976 Olympics in Greco-Roman and at the 1980 Olympics in freestyle wrestling and won a silver medal in 1980. At the 1980 Olympics Davaajav wrestled in the men's freestyle 74 kg, losing in the final to Valentin Raichev of Bulgaria, although he was winning the match six seconds before the end. In freestyle wrestling he also won a bronze medal at the 1978 Asian Games and placed fourth at the 1977 and 1979 world championships.
