= Detlef Kühn (wrestler) =

German wrestler

Personal information
- Nationality: German
- Born: 3 January 1959 (age 67) Königstein, Germany

Sport
- Sport: Wrestling

Detlef Kühn (born 3 January 1959) is a German wrestler. He competed in the men's Greco-Roman 82 kg at the 1980 Summer Olympics.
