= Bartholomäus Brötzner =

Austrian wrestler

Personal information
- Nationality: Austrian
- Born: 20 February 1957 (age 69) Wals-Siezenheim, Austria

Sport
- Sport: Wrestling
- Club: AC Wals

Bartholomäus Brötzner (born 20 February 1957) is an Austrian wrestler. He competed in the men's freestyle 74 kg at the 1980 Summer Olympics. He is the son of wrestler Bartl Brötzner.
