= Giuseppe Spagnoli =

Italian wrestler (1947–2003)

Personal information
- Nationality: Italian
- Born: 1 February 1947 Genoa, Italy
- Died: 14 February 2003 (aged 56) Genoa, Italy
- Height: 1.76 m (5 ft 9 in)
- Weight: 74 kg (163 lb)

Sport
- Sport: Wrestling
- Club: G.S. Italsider
Medal record
Mediterranean Games
Bronze medal – third place	1975 Algiers	Welterweight

Giuseppe Spagnoli (1 February 1947 – 14 February 2003) was an Italian wrestler who won a bronze medal at the 1975 Mediterranean Games.

He also competed in the men's freestyle 74 kg at the 1976 Summer Olympics.

== Biography ==
On Saturday 21 November 2009 the Italian National Olympic Committee (Liguria section) celebrated the Ligurian athletes participating in the Montreal 1976, Moscow 1980 and Los Angeles 1984 Olympics, including Spagnoli who had died six years before that event.

== Achievements ==
Year	Competition	Venue	Rank	Event	Notes
1975	Mediterranean Games	(Algeria) Algiers	3rd	Welterweight	
1976	Olympic Games	(Canada) Montreal	Round 3	Freestyle	

== National titles ==
Spagnoli has won three national championships.

- Italian Wrestling Championships
  - 70 kg: 1968
  - 74 kg: 1971, 1974
