= Ernesto Bahena =

Mexican wrestler (born 1961)

Personal information
- Nationality: Mexican
- Born: 7 November 1961 (age 64)

Sport
- Sport: Wrestling

Ernesto Bahena (born 7 November 1961) is a Mexican wrestler. He competed in the men's Greco-Roman 57 kg at the 1984 Summer Olympics.
