= Reinhold Steingräber =

German wrestler

Personal information
- Nationality: German
- Born: 9 January 1957 Kritzmow, Germany
- Died: 3 February 2006 (aged 49)

Sport
- Sport: Wrestling

Reinhold Steingräber (9 January 1957 – 3 February 2006) was a German wrestler. He competed in the men's freestyle 74 kg at the 1980 Summer Olympics.
