= Ronny Sigde =

Norwegian wrestler

Ronny Sigde (born 9 October 1960) is a retired Norwegian sport wrestler.

He was born in Oslo, and represented the sports club SK av 1909. Competing in the bantamweight, he finished twelfth at the 1980 European Wrestling Championships and seventh at the 1984 European Wrestling Championships. He then participated in the 1984 Summer Olympics, where he was eliminated after the third round. He then finished fifth at the 1987 World Wrestling Championships. At the 1988 Summer Olympics, he was again eliminated after the third round.
