= Yu Jae-gwon =

South Korean wrestler

Personal information
- Nationality: South Korean
- Born: 22 June 1946 (age 80)

Sport
- Sport: Wrestling

Yu Jae-gwon (유재권, born 22 June 1946) is a South Korean wrestler. He competed in the men's freestyle 74 kg at the 1976 Summer Olympics.
