= Ghazi Faisal =

Iraqi wrestler

Personal information
- Full name: Ghazi Faisal Salah
- Nationality: Iraqi
- Born: 1965 (age 60–61)

Sport
- Sport: Wrestling

Ghazi Faisal Salah (Arabic: غازي فيصل صلاح, born 1965) is an Iraqi wrestler. He competed in the men's Greco-Roman 57 kg at the 1988 Summer Olympics.
