= Fred Hempel =

German wrestler

Personal information
- Nationality: German
- Born: 12 June 1951 (age 75) Anhalt-Bitterfeld, East Germany

Sport
- Sport: Wrestling

Fred Hempel (born 12 June 1951) is a German former wrestler. He competed in the men's freestyle 74 kg at the 1976 Summer Olympics.
