= Anthony Amado =

American wrestler (born 1963)

Personal information
- Born: February 28, 1963 (age 63) Topeka, Kansas, U.S.

Sport
- Country: United States
- Sport: Wrestling
- Weight class: 57 kg
- Events: Greco-Roman; Folkstyle
- College team: Portland State
- Club: Sunkist Kids Wrestling Club
- Team: USA
Medal record
Collegiate Wrestling
Representing Portland State
NCAA Division II Championships
| Gold medal – first place | 1985 Fairborn | 126 lb |
| Silver medal – second place | 1986 Edwardsville | 126 lb |

Anthony Amado (born February 28, 1963) is an American wrestler and coach. He competed in the men's Greco-Roman 57 kg at the 1988 Summer Olympics. He wrestled collegiately for Portland State University and won the NCAA Division II national championship in 1985. As of June 2019, he is an assistant coach at Warner Pacific College.
