= Dennis Herrick =

Puerto Rican wrestler

Personal information
- Nationality: Puerto Rican
- Born: 13 December 1952 (age 73)

Sport
- Sport: Wrestling

Dennis Herrick (born 13 December 1952) is a Puerto Rican wrestler. He competed in the men's freestyle 74 kg at the 1976 Summer Olympics.
