= Kolbotn IL =

Norwegian sports club

- Club logo
- Full name: Kolbotn Idrettslag
- Sport: basketball, amateur wrestling, association football, sport gymnastics, disabled sports, handball, orienteering, competitive swimming, volleyball
- Founded: 1915
- Based in: Kolbotn, Norway

Kolbotn Idrettslag is a sports club from Kolbotn, Norway. Since 1960, the club has been organized in semi-autonomous sub-sections. The club runs basketball, amateur wrestling, association football, sport gymnastics, disabled sports, handball, orienteering, competitive swimming and volleyball.

Over the years, the club and its members have also been active in badminton, bandy, athletics, Nordic skiing and speedskating.

== History ==
Kullebunden Idrætsklub was founded in 1915 with Normand Nilsen as its first chairman. The club later changed its name to Kolbotn Idrettsklubb (KIK).

Kolbotn Arbeideridrettslag (Kolbotn AIL) was founded in 1924.

In 1934, the speedskaters broke away from KIK and started Kolbotn Skøyteklubb with Wilhelm Berthelsen as chairman. In 1946, the three clubs Kolbotn Idrettsklubb, Kolbotn Arbeideridrettslag, and Kolbotn Skøyteklubb merged and took the new name Kolbotn Idrettslag (aka Kolbotn I.L.). In 1985, Hellerasten Volleyball Klubb was included in Kolbotn I.L.

In 1925, polar explorer Roald Amundsen was appointed honorable member of the club.

The club is well-known for its eminent wrestlers. Kolbotn wrestlers had a successful period in the 1940s and again in the early 1980s to the mid-1990s. The most notable results were two Olympic gold medals by Jon Rønningen.

Kolbotn I.L. started Handball in 1940, and the Handball section won the National league in 1983 and 1984.

Kolbotn Volleyball won the National league in 1984 (as Hellerasten), and 1986. In 1992, Kolbotn Volleyball won both the National league and the National championship.

Kolbotn's Women's Football team won the elite Toppserien league in 2002, 2005, and 2006 and the national Cup championship in 2007. In 2009, Dan Eggen, former Norwegian international player, joined as the team's chief trainer.

== Wrestling ==
- 1947 Reidar Merli, 2nd place in European Championship
- 1948 Frithjof Clausen placed sixth at the Summer Olympics
- 1985 Jon Rønningen, World Champion
- 1985 Klaus Mysen, 3rd place in World Championship
- 1986 Jon Rønningen, 2nd place in World Championship
- 1986 Jon Rønningen, 3rd place in European Championship
- 1987 Ine Barlie, World Champion
- 1987 Lars Rønningen, 3rd place in World Championship
- 1988 Jon Rønningen, Olympic Gold winner
- 1988 Lars Rønningen, European Champion
- 1988 Jon Rønningen, 2nd place in European Championship
- 1989 Ine Barlie, 2nd place in World Championship
- 1989 Kirsten Borgen, 2nd place in World Championship
- 1989 Lars Rønningen, 2nd place in World Championship
- 1990 Jon Rønningen, European Champion
- 1990 Ine Barlie, 3rd place in World Championship
- 1991 Ine Barlie, 2nd place in World Championship
- 1991 Jon Rønningen, 3rd place in World Championship
- 1992 Jon Rønningen, Olympic Gold winner
- 1992 Ine Barlie, World Champion
- 1992 Lars Rønningen, European Champion
- 1993 Stig-Arild Kleven, 3rd place in European Championship
- 1995 Mette Barlie, 2nd place in World Championship
- 1997 Mette Barlie, 2nd place in World Championship
