= Saleh El-Said =

Syrian wrestler (born 1950)

Personal information
- Nationality: Syrian
- Born: 5 March 1950 (age 76)

Sport
- Sport: Wrestling

Saleh El-Said (born 5 March 1950) is a Syrian freestyle wrestler. He represented Syria in the men's freestyle 100 kg event at the 1980 Summer Olympics.
