= Yakup Topuz =

Turkish wrestler

Personal information
- Nationality: Turkish
- Born: 9 March 1954 (age 72)

Sport
- Sport: Wrestling

Yakup Topuz (born 9 March 1954) is a Turkish wrestler. He competed in the men's freestyle 74 kg at the 1976 Summer Olympics.
