= István Fehér =

Hungarian wrestler (1954–2021)

Personal information
- Nationality: Hungarian
- Born: 6 March 1954 Nagykőrös, Hungary
- Died: March 2021 Hungary

Sport
- Sport: Wrestling

István Fehér (6 March 1954 – March 2021) was a Hungarian wrestler. He competed in the men's freestyle 74 kg at the 1980 Summer Olympics.
