= Isaie Tonye =

Cameroonian wrestler

Personal information
- Nationality: Cameroonian
- Born: 27 April 1951 (age 75)

Sport
- Sport: Wrestling

Isaie Tonye (born 27 April 1951) is a Cameroonian wrestler. He competed in the men's freestyle 74 kg at the 1980 Summer Olympics.
