= Siegfried Seibold =

German wrestler

Personal information
- Nationality: German
- Born: 12 August 1959 (age 66) Bad Reichenhall, Germany

Sport
- Sport: Wrestling

Siegfried Seibold (born 12 August 1959) is a German wrestler. He competed in the men's Greco-Roman 82 kg at the 1984 Summer Olympics.
