= Yang Changling =

Chinese wrestler (born 1965)

Personal information
- Nationality: Chinese
- Born: 11 March 1965 (age 61)

Sport
- Sport: Wrestling

Yang Changling (Chinese: 楊長嶺; born 11 March 1965) is a Chinese wrestler. He competed in the men's Greco-Roman 57 kg at the 1988 Summer Olympics.
