= Charalambos Cholidis =

Greek wrestler (1956–2019)

Medal record

Men's Greco-Roman wrestling

Representing Greece

Olympic Games
Bronze medal – third place	1984 Los Angeles	Bantamweight
Bronze medal – third place	1988 Seoul	Bantamweight

World Championships
Bronze medal – third place	1978 Budapest	Flyweight
Bronze medal – third place	1986 Budapest	Bantamweight

European Championships
Bronze medal – third place	1976 Leningrad	Flyweight
Silver medal – second place	1986 Budapest	Bantamweight
Silver medal – second place	1986 Piraeus	Bantamweight

Mediterranean Games
Gold medal – first place	1975 Algiers	Flyweight
Gold medal – first place	1979 Split	Flyweight

Charalambos "Babis" Cholidis (Greek: Χαράλαμπος Χολίδης; 1 October 1956 – 26 June 2019) was a Greek wrestler who competed, in the 1976 Summer Olympics, 1980 Summer Olympics, 1984 Summer Olympics and in the 1988 Summer Olympics. He was born in Guryev, Kazakh SSR and died in Athens. He was named the 1978, 1983, and 1988 Greek Male Athlete of the Year.
