= Frank Famiano =

American wrestler (born 1961)

Personal information
- Full name: Frank Steve Famiano
- Born: April 22, 1961 (age 65) Schenectady, New York, U.S.

Sport
- Country: United States
- Sport: Wrestling
- Event: Greco-Roman
- College team: SUNY Brockport
- Club: Adirondack Wrestling Association
- Team: USA
Medal record
Men's Greco-Roman wrestling
Representing the United States
Pan American Games
Bronze medal – third place	1991 Havana	57 kg

Frank Steve Famiano (born April 22, 1961) is an American former Greco-Roman wrestler who competed at the 1984 Summer Olympics.
