= András Sike =

Hungarian Greco-Roman wrestler

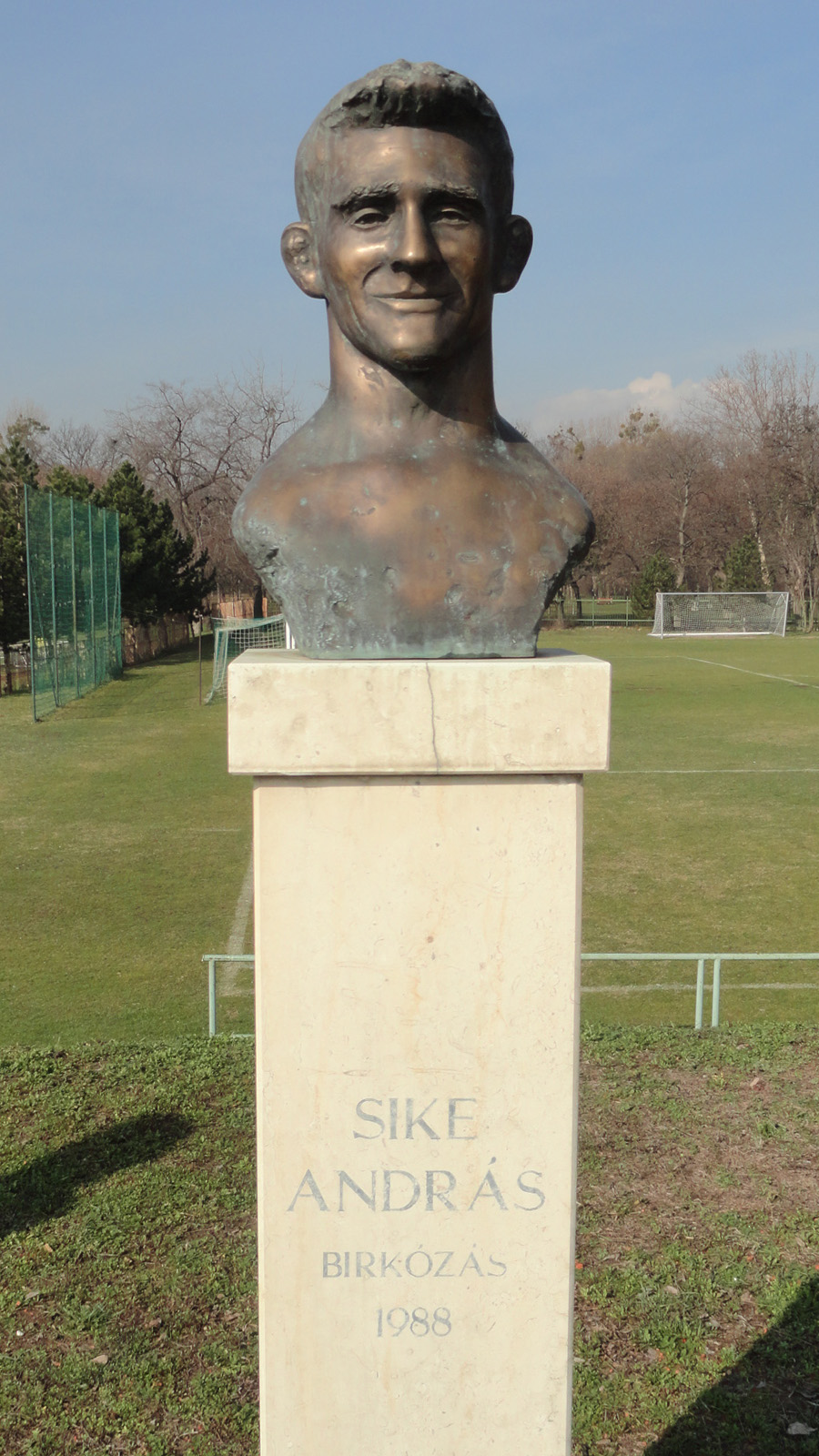

Personal information
- Born: 18 July 1965 (age 60) Eger, Hungary
- Height: 167 cm (5 ft 6 in)

Sport
- Sport: Greco-Roman wrestling
- Club: Ferencvárosi TC
Medal record
Representing Hungary
Olympic Games
Gold medal – first place	1988 Seoul	57 kg
World Championships
Bronze medal – third place	1989 Martigny	57 kg
Bronze medal – third place	1991 Varna	57 kg
European Championships
Silver medal – second place	1990 Poznań	57 kg
Bronze medal – third place	1988 Kolbotn	57 kg

András Sike (born 18 July 1965) is a retired bantamweight Greco-Roman wrestler from Hungary. He competed at the 1988 and 1992 Olympics and won a gold medal in 1988. Between 1988 and 1991 he also won four medals at the world and European championships. After retiring from competitions he ran his own restaurant.
