= Louis Santerre =

Canadian former wrestler (born 1959)

Louis Santerre (born 26 May 1959) is a Canadian former wrestler who competed in the 1984 Summer Olympics.
