= Klaus Mysen =

Norwegian wrestler (born 1953)

Personal information
- Born: 15 June 1953 (age 73) Oslo, Norway

Sport
- Sport: Wrestling
- Club: Kolbotn IL
Medal record
Men's wrestling
Representing Norway
World Championships
Bronze medal – third place	1985 Kolbotn	82 kg

Klaus Mysen (born 15 June 1953) is a Norwegian sport wrestler.

He was born in Oslo and represented the club Kolbotn IL. He won a bronze medal in Greco-Roman wrestling at the 1985 World Wrestling Championships.

He placed fourth at the 1981 World Wrestling Championships, and competed at the 1984 Summer Olympics.

He was awarded the Kongepokal trophy five times, in 1976, 1982, 1983, 1986 and 1989.
