= Július Strnisko =

Slovak wrestler

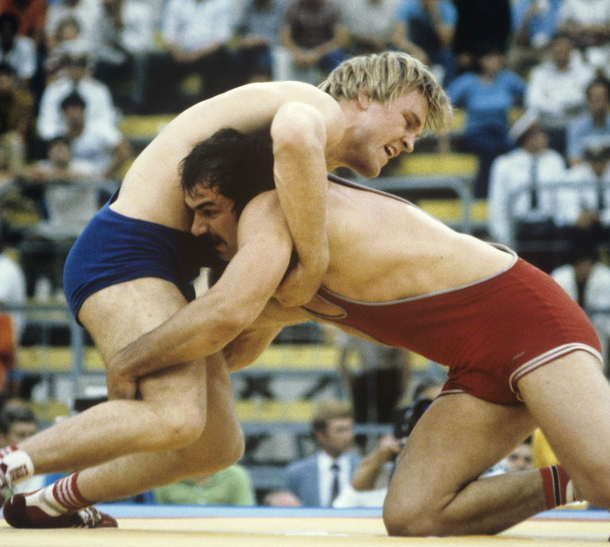
- Strnisko (left) at the 1980 Olympics

Personal information
- Born: 6 August 1958 Nitra, Czechoslovakia
- Died: 20 September 2008 (aged 50) Nitra, Slovakia
- Height: 188 cm (6 ft 2 in)

Sport
- Sport: Freestyle wrestling
Medal record
Representing Czechoslovakia
Olympic Games
Bronze medal – third place	1980 Moscow	-100 kg
European Championships
Bronze medal – third place	1982 Varna	-100 kg
Bronze medal – third place	1983 Budapest	-100 kg

Július Strnisko (6 August 1958 – 20 September 2008) was a Slovak freestyle wrestler. He competed for Czechoslovakia at the 1980 and 1988 Olympics and won a bronze medal in 1980. He won two more bronze medals at the European championships in 1982 and 1983.
