= Piotr Michalik =

Polish wrestler

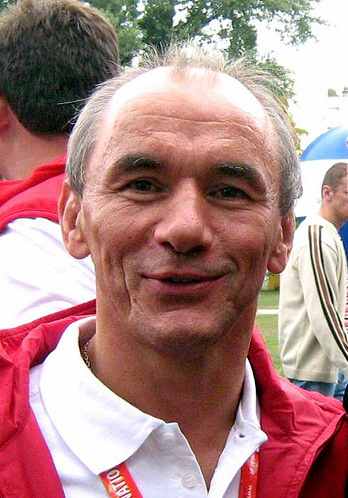
- Piotr Michalik in 2007

Personal information
- Born: 20 May 1957 (age 69) Katowice, Poland

Sport
- Sport: Greco-Roman wrestling
Medal record
Representing Poland
World Championships
Gold medal – first place	1982 Katowice	-57 kg
European Championships
Bronze medal – third place	1981 Gothenburg	-57 kg
Friendship Games
Bronze medal – third place	1984 Sofia	-57 kg

Piotr Michalik (born 20 May 1957) is a bantamweight Greco-Roman wrestler from Poland who won a world title in 1982 and a bronze medal at the 1981 European Championships. He continued competing in wrestling in the 2000s, in the masters category. His elder brother Jan is also an international Greco-Roman wrestler.
