= Ilpo Seppälä =

Finnish wrestler

Ilpo Kalervo Seppälä (born 26 October 1953, in Viitasaari) is a Finnish former wrestler who competed in the 1984 Summer Olympics.
