= Mohamed El-Ashram =

Egyptian wrestler (1955–2022)

Personal information
- Nationality: Egyptian
- Born: 24 July 1955
- Died: 23 March 2022 (aged 66)

Sport
- Sport: Wrestling

Mohamed El-Ashram (24 July 1955 – 23 March 2022) was an Egyptian wrestler. He competed in two events at the 1984 Summer Olympics.
