= Aleksandr Shestakov =

Soviet wrestler (born 1961)

Personal information
- Full name: Aleksandr Borisovich Shestakov
- Nationality: Soviet
- Born: 22 November 1961 (age 64) Minsk, Byelorussian SSR, Soviet Union (now Belarus)

Sport
- Sport: Wrestling
Medal record
Men's Greco-Roman wrestling
Representing the Soviet Union
European Championships
Gold medal – first place	1988 Kolbotn	-57 kg

Aleksandr Borisovich Shestakov (Russian: Александр Борисович Шестаков; born 22 November 1961) is a Soviet wrestler. He competed in the men's Greco-Roman 57 kg at the 1988 Summer Olympics.
