= Masaki Eto =

Japanese wrestler (born 1954)

Medal record

Men's Greco-Roman wrestling

Representing Japan

Olympic Games
Silver medal – second place	1984 Los Angeles	57 kg

Masaki Eto (江藤 正基, Etō Masaki; born 26 February 1954) is a Japanese former wrestler who competed in the 1984 Summer Olympics.
