= Nasser Zahedi =

German writer (born 1961)

Nasser Zahedi (born 20 May 1961, in Qom, Imperial State of Iran) is a German Doctor of Medicine, author, translator, and photographer from Iran.
