= Stoyan Balov =

Bulgarian Greco-Roman wrestler

Medal record

Men's Greco-Roman wrestling

Representing Bulgaria

Olympic Games
Silver medal – second place	1988 Seoul	57 kg

Stoyan Balov (Bulgarian: Стоян Балов; born 24 May 1960) is a Bulgarian former wrestler who competed in the 1988 Summer Olympics.
