= Ryszard Ścigalski =

Polish wrestler (born 1954)

Ryszard Ścigalski (born 22 March 1954 in Łódź) is a Polish former wrestler who competed in the 1980 Summer Olympics.
