= Mustafa Suzan =

Turkish wrestler

Personal information
- Nationality: Turkish
- Born: 5 April 1957 (age 69)

Sport
- Sport: Wrestling

Mustafa Suzan (born 5 April 1957) is a Turkish wrestler. He competed in the men's Greco-Roman 82 kg at the 1984 Summer Olympics.
