= Riccardo Niccolini =

Italian wrestler

Personal information
- Nationality: Italian
- Born: 4 July 1958 (age 68) Livorno, Italy

Sport
- Sport: Wrestling

Riccardo Niccolini (born 4 July 1958) is an Italian wrestler. He competed in the men's freestyle 74 kg at the 1980 Summer Olympics.
