= Dimitrios Thanopoulos =

Greek wrestler (born 1959)

Medal record

Men's Greco-Roman wrestling

Representing Greece

Olympic Games
| Silver medal – second place | 1984 Los Angeles | middleweight |

Mediterranean Games
| Bronze medal – third place | 1979 Split | middleweight |
| Silver medal – second place | 1983 Casablanca | middleweight |
| Bronze medal – third place | 1987 Latakia | middleweight |

Dimitrios Thanopoulos (Greek: Δημήτριος Θανόπουλος, born 2 August 1959) is a Greek former wrestler who competed in the 1984 Summer Olympics. He was named the 1984 Greek Male Athlete of the Year. He was born in Stemnitsa, Arkadia.
