= Sören Claeson =

Swedish wrestler (born 1959)

Medal record

Representing Sweden

Men's Greco-Roman wrestling

Olympic Games
Bronze medal – third place	1984 Los Angeles	Middleweight

Sören Claeson (born 9 February 1959) is a Swedish wrestler. He was born in Lidköping. He won an Olympic bronze medal in Greco-Roman wrestling in 1984, and also competed at the 1980 and 1988 Olympics.
