= Mohamed El-Oulabi =

Syrian wrestler

Personal information
- Nationality: Syrian
- Born: 3 May 1951 (age 74)

Sport
- Sport: Wrestling

Mohamed El-Oulabi (born 3 May 1951) is a Syrian wrestler. He competed in two events at the 1980 Summer Olympics.
