= Georg Marchl =

Austrian wrestler

Georg Marchl (born 22 January 1964) is an Austrian former wrestler who competed in the 1984 Summer Olympics.
