= Valentin Raychev =

Bulgarian freestyle wrestler

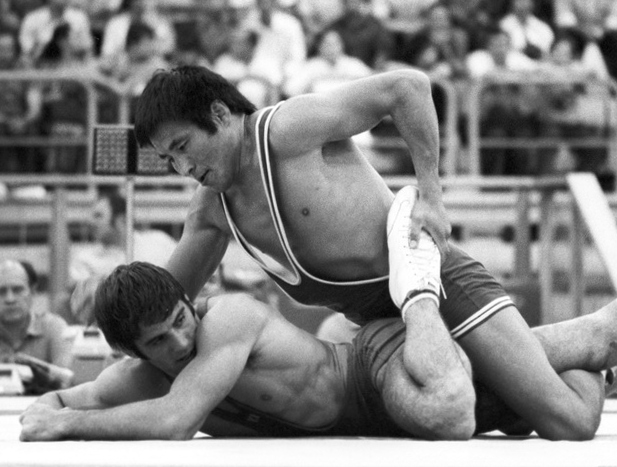
- Raychev (bottom) at the 1980 Olympics

Personal information
- Born: 20 September 1958 (age 67) Sofia, Bulgaria
- Height: 174 cm (5 ft 9 in)

Sport
- Sport: Freestyle wrestling
- Club: Levski Sofia
Medal record
Men's freestyle wrestling
Representing Bulgaria
Olympic Games
| Gold medal – first place | 1980 Moscow | 74 kg |
World Championships
| Silver medal – second place | 1981 Skopje | 74 kg |
European Championships
| Silver medal – second place | 1981 Łódź | 74 kg |

Valentin Raychev (Bulgarian: Валентин Райчев; born 20 September 1958) is a retired welterweight freestyle wrestler from Bulgaria. He won an Olympics gold medal in 1980 and silver medals at the world and European championships in 1981.
