= Nicolae Zamfir (wrestler) =

Romanian wrestler (born 1958)

Personal information
- Nationality: Romanian
- Born: 26 July 1958 (age 68) Picior de Munte, Romania

Sport
- Sport: Wrestling
Medal record
Representing Romania
World Championships
| Silver medal – second place | 1982 Edmonton | -57kg |
Summer Universiade
| Gold medal – first place | 1981 Bucharest | -57kg |

Nicolae Zamfir (born 26 July 1958) is a Romanian wrestler. He competed in the men's Greco-Roman 57 kg at the 1984 Summer Olympics.
