= Antal Bodó =

Hungarian wrestler

Personal information
- Nationality: Hungarian
- Born: 28 March 1958 (age 68) Szeged, Hungary

Sport
- Sport: Wrestling
Medal record
Representing Hungary
Summer Universiade
Bronze medal – third place	1977 Sofia	-100 kg

Antal Bodó (born 28 March 1958) is a Hungarian wrestler. He competed in the men's freestyle 100 kg at the 1980 Summer Olympics.
