= Mihály Toma =

Hungarian wrestler

Personal information
- Nationality: Hungarian
- Born: 6 March 1948 (age 77); Nagybánhegyes, Hungary

Sport
- Sport: Wrestling

Mihály Toma (born 6 March 1948) is a Hungarian wrestler. He competed at the 1976 Summer Olympics and the 1980 Summer Olympics.
