= Ernesto Razzino =

Italian wrestler

Ernesto Razzino (born 14 June 1961) is an Italian former wrestler who competed in the 1984 Summer Olympics, in the 1988 Summer Olympics, and in the 1992 Summer Olympics.
