= Dan Karabin =

Slovak wrestler (born 1955)

Medal record

Representing Czechoslovakia

Men's Freestyle wrestling

Olympic Games
Bronze medal – third place	1980 Moscow	Welterweight

Dan Karabin (born 18 February 1955) is a Slovak wrestler who competed for Czechoslovakia. He was born in Nitra. He won an Olympic bronze medal in Freestyle wrestling in 1980.
