= Khojawahid Zahedi =

Afghan wrestler (born 1960)

Khojawahid Zahedi (born 5 June 1960) is a former Afghanistan wrestler, who competed at the 1980 Summer Olympics in the welterweight event.
