= Marin Pîrcălabu =

Romanian wrestler

Personal information
- Nationality: Romanian
- Born: 9 January 1952 (age 73); Daia, Romania

Sport
- Sport: Wrestling

Marin Pîrcălabu (born 9 January 1952) is a Romanian wrestler. He competed at the 1976 Summer Olympics and the 1980 Summer Olympics.
