= Gennady Korban =

Russian wrestler (born 1949)

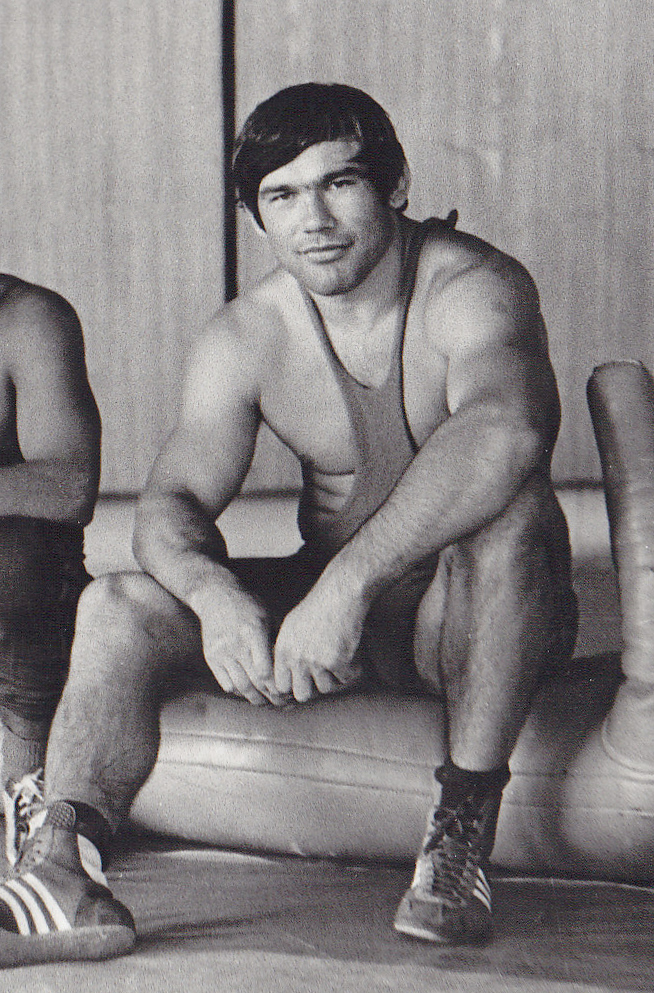

Personal information
- Born: 9 February 1949 (age 77) Engels, Saratov Oblast, Russia
- Height: 175 cm (5 ft 9 in)

Sport
- Sport: Greco-Roman wrestling
- Club: CSKA Moscow
Medal record
Men's Greco-Roman wrestling
Representing the Soviet Union
Olympic Games
Gold medal – first place	1980 Moscow	82 kg
World Championships
Gold medal – first place	1979 San Diego	82 kg
Gold medal – first place	1981 Oslo	82 kg
European Championships
Gold medal – first place	1980 Prievidza	82 kg
Gold medal – first place	1981 Gothenburg	82 kg
Summer Universiade
Gold medal – first place	1973 Moscow	82 kg

Gennady Vladimirovich Korban (Russian: Геннадий Владимирович Корбан; born 9 February 1949) is a retired middleweight Greco-Roman wrestler from Russia. Between 1979 and 1981 he won two world titles, two European titles, two Soviet titles, and an Olympic gold medal.

Korban took up wrestling in 1962 and won a gold medal at the 1973 Summer Universiade. He retired in the early 1980s to work as a wrestling coach, first in Russia and then in Germany, where he immigrated after the dissolution of the Soviet Union. Since 2007, an annual wrestling tournament in his honor has been held in his birth town of Engels.
