= Kiro Ristov =

Yugoslav wrestler (1953–1990)

Personal information
- Nationality: Yugoslav
- Born: 11 February 1953 Skopje, Yugoslavia
- Died: 6 February 1990 (aged 36)

Sport
- Sport: Wrestling
Medal record
Representing Yugoslavia
Summer Universiade
Bronze medal – third place	1981 Bucharest	74 kg
Mediterranean Games
Gold medal – first place	1979 Split	74 kg
Silver medal – second place	1975 Algiers	74 kg

Kiro Ristov (11 February 1953 – 6 February 1990) was a Yugoslav wrestler. He competed at the 1976 Summer Olympics and the 1980 Summer Olympics.
