= Slavcho Chervenkov =

Bulgarian wrestler (born 1955)

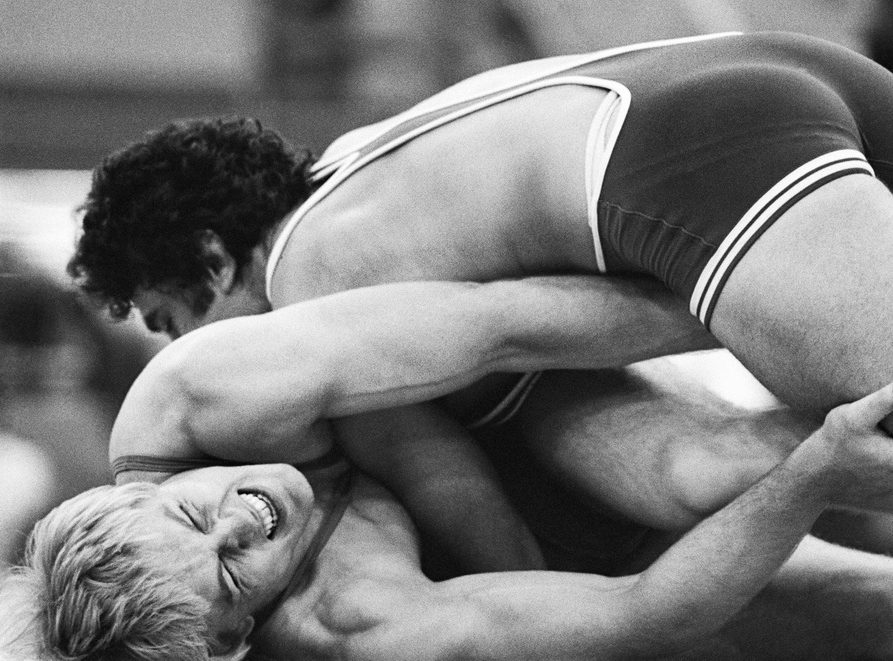
- Chervenkov (top) at the 1980 Olympics

Personal information
- Born: 18 September 1955 (age 70)
- Height: 184 cm (6 ft 0 in)
- Weight: 100 kg (220 lb)

Sport
- Sport: Freestyle wrestling
Medal record
Representing Bulgaria
Olympic Games
Silver medal – second place	1980 Moskva	-100 kg
World Championships
Silver medal – second place	1982 Edmonton	-100 kg
European Championships
Silver medal – second place	1979 Bucharest	-100 kg
Silver medal – second place	1980 Prievidza	-100 kg

Slavcho Georgiev Chervenkov (Bulgarian: Славчо Георгиев Червенков, born 18 September 1955) is a retired heavyweight freestyle wrestler from Bulgaria. He won silver medals at the 1980 Olympics, 1982 World Championships, and 1979 and 1980 European championships.
