= Mehmet Karadağ =

Turkish wrestler

Personal information
- Born: 10 July 1956 (age 70)

Sport
- Sport: Greco-Roman wrestling
Medal record
Representing Turkey
Mediterranean Games
Gold medal – first place	1983 Casablanca	-57 kg
Bronze medal – third place	1979 Split	-57 kg
Bronze medal – third place	1987 Latakia	-57 kg
Summer Universiade
Bronze medal – third place	1977 Sofia	-57 kg

Mehmet Serhat Karadağ (born 10 July 1956) is a Turkish former wrestler who competed in the 1984 Summer Olympics.
