= Jarmo Övermark =

Finnish wrestler (born 1955)

Jarmo Erkki Övermark (born 26 May 1955 in Lappajärvi) is a Finnish former wrestler who competed in the 1976 Summer Olympics, in the 1980 Summer Olympics, and in the 1984 Summer Olympics. His best Olympic finish was in the 1984 Summer Games, where he placed fifth in the men's middleweight event.
