= Pasquale Passarelli =

German wrestler

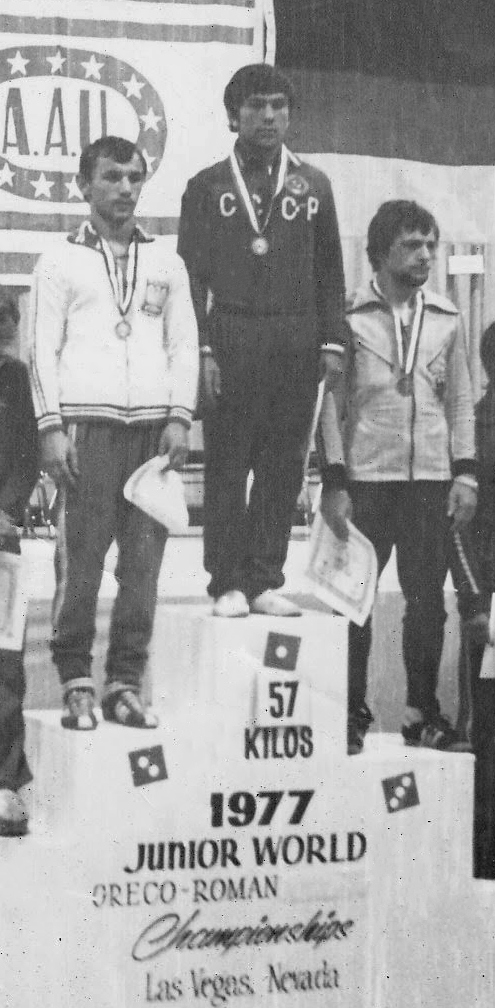
- Passarelli (right) at the 1977 Junior World Championships

Personal information
- Born: 14 March 1957 (age 69) Gambatesa, Italy
- Height: 1.62 m (5 ft 4 in)
- Weight: 57 kg (126 lb)

Sport
- Sport: Wrestling
- Event: Greco-Roman
- Club: SV Johannis 07, Nürnberg
- Coached by: Heinz Ostermann
Medal record
Representing West Germany
Men's Greco-Roman wrestling
Olympic Games
Gold medal – first place	1984 Los Angeles	57 kg
World Championships
Gold medal – first place	1981 Oslo	57 kg
Bronze medal – third place	1978 Mexico City	57 kg
European Championships
Gold medal – first place	1981 Gothenburg	57 kg
Silver medal – second place	1979 Bucharest	57 kg
Silver medal – second place	1984 Jönköping	57 kg

Pasquale Passarelli (born 14 March 1957) is a retired Italian-born German wrestler who competed in the Greco-Roman bantamweight division. He won a world and a European title in 1981 and an Olympic gold medal in 1984. He missed the 1980 Olympics due to their boycott by West Germany.

Passarelli was born in Italy, and moved to West Germany at the age of five. He retired after the 1984 Olympics, and later worked as a real estate agent in Southern Germany. Between 2001 and 2005 he coached wrestlers at the club KSV Berghausen. His brothers Claudio and Thomas are also retired competitive wrestlers.
