= Ion Draica =

Romanian Greco-Roman wrestler

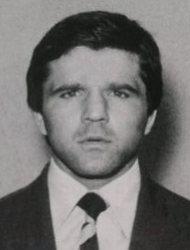

Personal information
- Born: 5 January 1958 (age 68) Constanţa, Romania
- Height: 178 cm (5 ft 10 in)

Sport
- Sport: Greco-Roman wrestling
- Club: Farul Constanţa
Medal record
Representing Romania
Olympic Games
Gold medal – first place	1984 Los Angeles	82 kg
World Championships
Silver medal – second place	1977 Gothenburg	82 kg
Gold medal – first place	1978 Mexico City	82 kg
Bronze medal – third place	1981 Oslo	82 kg
Silver medal – second place	1982 Katowice	82 kg
European Championships
Gold medal – first place	1977 Bursa	82 kg
Gold medal – first place	1978 Sofia	82 kg
Gold medal – first place	1979 Bucharest	82 kg
Bronze medal – third place	1982 Varna	82 kg
Silver medal – second place	1983 Budapest	82 kg
Summer Universiade
Gold medal – first place	1977 Sofia	-82kg
Gold medal – first place	1981 Bucharest	-82kg

Ion Draica (born 5 January 1958) is a retired middleweight Greco-Roman wrestler from Romania. He won the world title in 1978, the European title in 1977–1979 and an Olympic gold medal in 1984.

Draica spent his entire career with the club Farul Constanţa, and after retiring from competitions became its president. In 2000 he was also appointed as president of Romanian Federation of Wrestling. In parallel he was involved in questionable business activities, which resulted in large debts and divorce with his wife Daniela.

Draica was sentenced to three years in prison for fraud and tax evasion, but served a reduced sentence due to health issues.
