= Tomasz Busse =

Polish wrestler (born 1956)

Tomasz Busse (born 4 October 1956 in Łódź) is a Polish former wrestler who competed in the 1980 Summer Olympics.
