= Santiago Morales (wrestler) =

Spanish wrestler

Personal information
- Nationality: Spanish
- Born: 20 November 1951
- Died: 26 November 2005 (aged 54)

Sport
- Sport: Wrestling

Santiago Morales (20 November 1951 – 26 November 2005) was a Spanish wrestler. He competed in the men's freestyle 100 kg at the 1980 Summer Olympics.
