= Patrice Mourier =

French wrestler

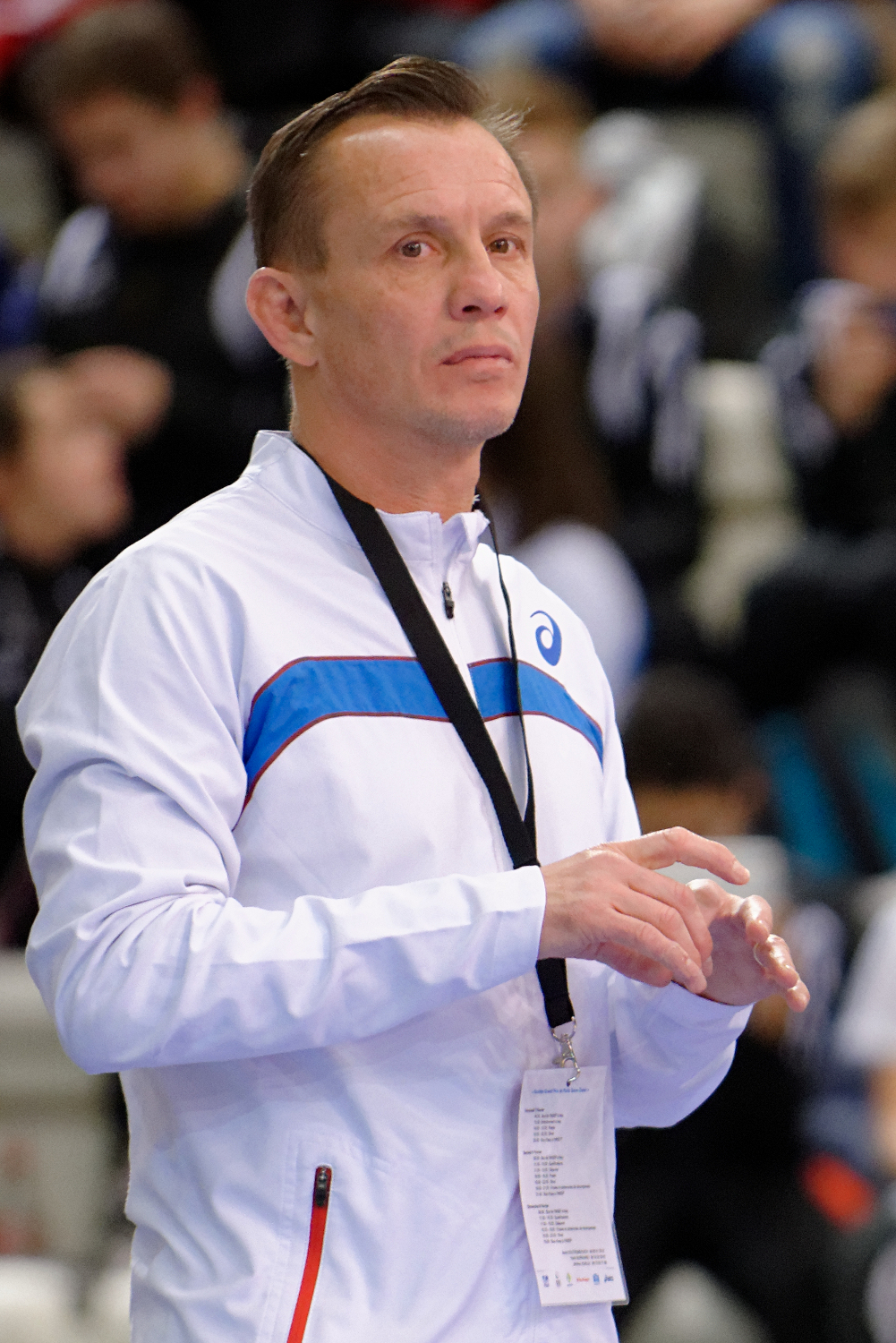
Mourier at the 2014 Paris Golden Grand Prix

Patrice Mourier (born 10 April 1962) is a French former wrestler, born in Lyon, who competed in the 1984 Summer Olympics, in the 1988 Summer Olympics, and in the 1992 Summer Olympics. He won the gold medal in the World championship in 1987, and in the European championship in 1990. He is France's wrestling national coach since 2004.
