= Jan Dołgowicz =

Polish wrestler (born 1954)

Medal record

Men's Greco-Roman wrestling

Representing Poland

Olympic Games
Silver medal – second place	1980 Moscow	Middleweight

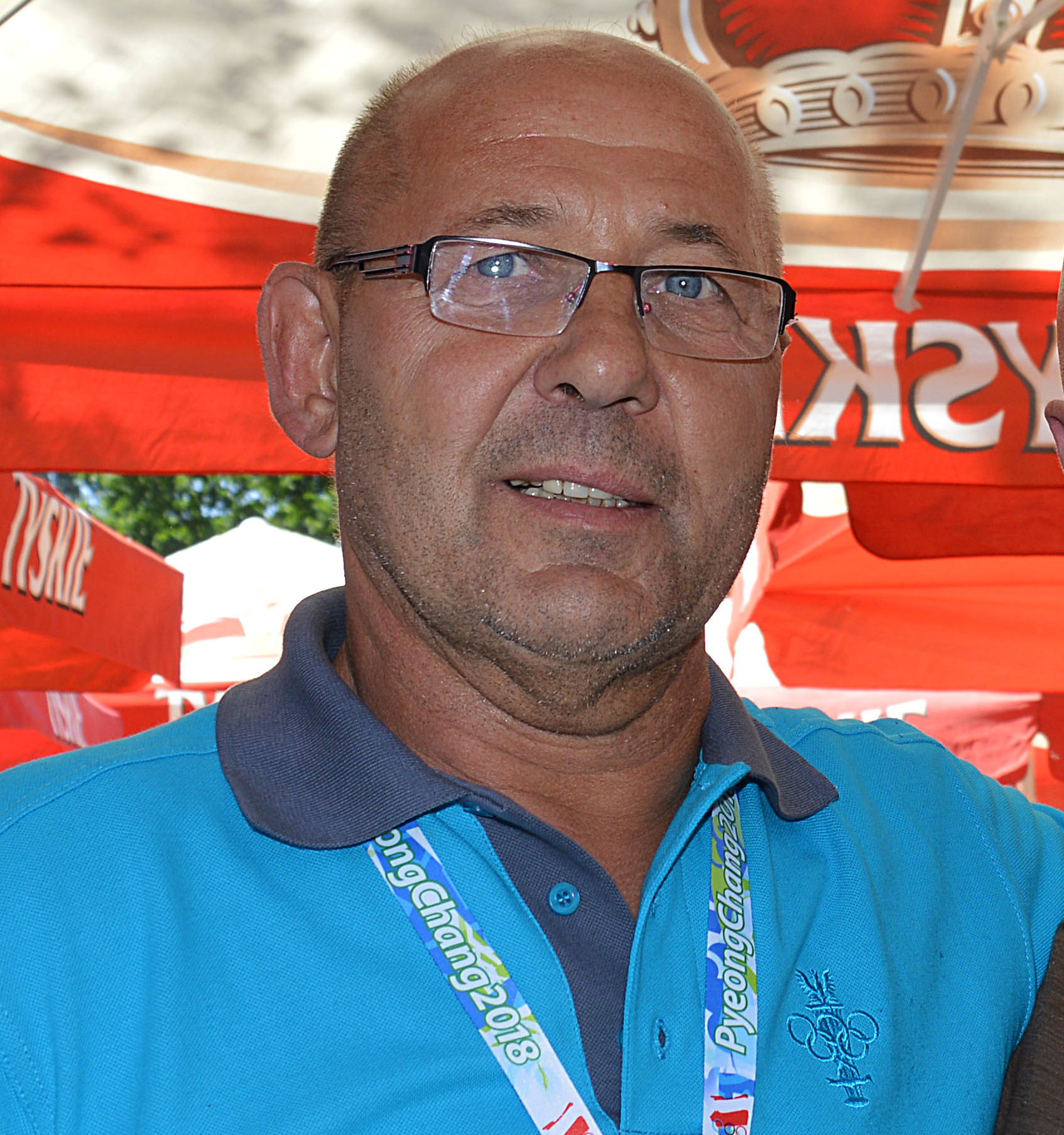
Jan Dołgowicz

Jan Dołgowicz (born 21 December 1954 in Skarbiewo) is a Polish wrestler who competed in the 1980 Summer Olympics.

Silver medalist at the 1980 Summer Olympics in wrestling in 82 kg category (middleweight).
