= List of World and Olympic Champions in Greco-Roman wrestling =

Listed are wrestlers who were World or Olympic Champions in Greco-Roman wrestling. Greco-Roman wrestling competition was held at the first modern Olympics in 1896. The Greco-Roman World Championships was first held in 1904. The World Championships takes place during non Olympic years. At the World Championships team scoring is kept, while no official team statistics are kept for the Olympics.

== World Level Champions in Greco-Roman wrestling by year and weight ==
Olympic Champions and Olympic competition years in Greco-Roman wrestling are highlighted in gold.

=== 1896 ===
Year	Team	Unlimited Weight
1896	(Germany)	(Germany) Schuhmann, Carl (1/1)

=== 1898 ===
Year	
1898	(France) Pons, Paul

=== 1904 ===
Year	Team	75 kg	Unlimited Weight
1904	(Austria)	(Denmark) Ahlqvist, Severin (1/1)	(Austria) Arnold, Rudolf (1/1)

=== 1905 ===
Year	Team	68 kg	80 kg	Unlimited Weight
1905	(Germany)	(Germany) Schibilski, Theodor (1/1)	(Germany) Hein, Albert (1/1)	(Denmark) Jensen, Søren Marinus (1/2)

=== 1906–1907 ===
Year	Team	75 kg	85 kg	Unlimited Weight
1906	(Austria)	(Austria) Watzl, Rudolf (1/1)	(Finland) Weckman, Verner (1/2)	(Denmark) Jensen, Søren Marinus (2/2)
1907	(Denmark)	(Germany) Übler, Christoph (1/1)	(Denmark) Christensen, Harald (1/1)	(Denmark) Egeberg, Hans (1/2)

=== 1908–1909 ===
Year	Team	66 kg	73 kg	93 kg	Unlimited Weight
1908	(Sweden)	(Italy) Porro, Enrico (1/1)	(Sweden) Martensson, Frithiof (1/1)	(Finland) Weckman, Verner (2/2)	(Hungary) Weisz, Richárd (1/1)

Year	Team	75 kg	Unlimited Weight
1908	(Austria)	(Austria) Diry, Robert (1/1)	(Denmark) Egeberg, Hans (2/2)
1909	(Austria)	(Austria) Toduschek, Alois (1/1)	(Austria) Schmitz, Anton (1/1)

=== 1910 ===
Year	Team	60 kg	70 kg	85 kg	Unlimited Weight
1910	(Germany)	(Germany) Wernicke, Karl (1/1)	(Germany) Altroggen, Fritz (1/1)	(Germany) Buchholz, Hermann (1/1)	(Germany) Sperling, Gustav (1/1)

=== 1911 ===
Year	Team	60 kg	67 kg	73 kg	83 kg	Unlimited Weight
1911	(Finland)	(Finland) Hyvönen, Antti (1/1)	(Finland) Tuominen, Nestori (1/1)	(Finland) Väre, Emil (1/3)	(Finland) Asikainen, Alfred (1/1)	(Finland) Saarela, Yrjö (1/2)

=== 1912 ===
Year	Team	60 kg	67.5 kg	75 kg	82.5 kg	Unlimited Weight
1912	(Finland)	(Finland) Koskelo, Kaarlo (1/1)	(Finland) Väre, Emil (2/3)	(Sweden) Johansson, Claes (1/2)	None awarded	(Finland) Saarela, Yrjö (2/2)

=== 1913 ===
Year	Team	67.5 kg	75 kg	82.5 kg	Unlimited Weight
1913	(Sweden)	(Germany) Hegewald, Ewald (1/1)	(Russia) Baumann, Georg (1/1)	(Sweden) Nilsson, Ernst (1/2)	(Sweden) Ahlgren, Anders (1/1)

=== 1920 ===
Year	Team	60 kg	67.5 kg	75 kg	82.5 kg	Unlimited Weight
1920	(Finland)	(Finland) Friman, Oskari (1/3)	(Finland) Väre, Emil (3/3)	(Sweden) Westergren, Carl (1/4)	(Sweden) Johansson, Claes (2/2)	(Finland) Lindfors, Adolf (1/1)

Year	Team	60 kg	67.5 kg	75 kg	82.5 kg	Unlimited Weight
1920	(Austria)	(Germany) Reitmeier, Franz (1/1)	(Hungary) Radvány, Ödön (1/1)	(Austria) Fischer, Viktor (1/1)	(Austria) Heinl, Michael (1/1)	(Germany) Bock, Heinrich (1/1)

=== 1921–1928 ===
Year	Team	58 kg	62 kg	67.5 kg	75 kg	82.5 kg	Unlimited Weight
1921	(Finland)	(Finland) Ikonen, Väinö (1/1)	(Finland) Anttila, Kalle (1/3)	(Finland) Friman, Oskari (2/3)	(Finland) Tamminen, Taavi (1/1)	(Finland) Rosenqvist, Edil (1/2)	(Finland) Salila, Johan (1/1)
1922	(Sweden)	(Sweden) Svensson, Fritiof (1/1)	(Finland) Anttila, Kalle (2/3)	(Finland) Westerlund, Edvard (1/2)	(Sweden) Westergren, Carl (2/4)	(Finland) Rosenqvist, Edil (2/2)	(Sweden) Nilsson, Ernst (2/2)
1924	(Finland)	(Estonia) Pütsep, Eduard (1/1)	(Finland) Anttila, Kalle (3/3)	(Finland) Friman, Oskari (3/3)	(Finland) Westerlund, Edvard (2/2)	(Sweden) Westergren, Carl (3/4)	(France) Deglane, Henri (1/1)
1928	(Germany)	(Germany) Leucht, Kurt (1/1)	(Estonia) Väli, Voldemar (1/1)	(Hungary) Keresztes, Lajos (1/1)	(Finland) Kokkinen, Väinö (1/2)	(Egypt) Moustafa, Ibrahim (1/1)	(Sweden) Svensson, Rudolf (1/2)

=== 1932–1936 ===
Year	Team	56 kg	61 kg	66 kg	72 kg	79 kg	87 kg	Unlimited Weight
1932	(Sweden)	(Germany) Brendel, Jakob (1/1)	(Italy) Gozzi, Giovanni (1/1)	(Sweden) Malmberg, Eric (1/1)	(Sweden) Johansson, Ivar (1/2)	(Finland) Kokkinen, Väinö (2/2)	(Sweden) Svensson, Rudolf (2/2)	(Sweden) Westergren, Carl (4/4)
1936	(Sweden)	(Hungary) Lõrincz, Márton (1/1)	(Turkey) Erkan, Yaşar (2/2)	(Finland) Koskela, Lauri (1/1)	(Sweden) Svedberg, Rudolf (1/1)	(Sweden) Johansson, Ivar (2/2)	(Sweden) Cadier, Axel (1/1)	(Estonia) Palusalu, Kristjan (1/1)

=== 1948–1968 ===
Year	Team	52 kg	57 kg	62 kg (−1961), 63 kg (1962–1968)	67 kg (−1961), 70 kg (1962–1968)	73 kg (−1961), 78 kg (1962–1968)	79 kg (−1961), 87 kg (1962–1968)	87 kg (−1961), 97 kg (1962–1968)	Unlimited Weight
1948	(Sweden)	(Italy) Lombardi, Pietro (1/1)	(Sweden) Pettersen, Kurt (1/1)	(Turkey) Oktav, Mehmet (1/1)	(Sweden) Freij, Gustav (1/2)	(Sweden) Andersson, Gösta (1/1)	(Sweden) Grönberg, Axel (1/3)	(Sweden) Nilsson, Karl-Erik (1/1)	(Turkey) Kireççi, Ahmet (1/1)
1949	N/A	No Championships Held							
1950	(Sweden)	(Sweden) Johansson, Bengt (1/1)	(Egypt) Hassan, Ali Mahmoud (1/1)	(Sweden) Anderberg, Olle (1/2)	(Hungary) Gal, Jozsef (1/1)	(Finland) Siimanainen, Matti (1/1)	(Sweden) Grönberg, Axel (2/3)	(Turkey) Candas, Muharrem (1/1)	(Sweden) Antonsson, Bertil (1/2)
1951	N/A	No Championships Held							
1952	(Soviet Union)	(Soviet Union) Gurevich, Boris Maksovich (1/3)	(Hungary) Hódos, Imre (1/1)	(Soviet Union) Punkin, Yakov (1/1)	(Soviet Union) Safin, Shazam (1/1)	(Hungary) Szilvásy, Miklós (1/1)	(Sweden) Grönberg, Axel (3/3)	(Finland) Gröndahl, Kelpo (1/1)	(Soviet Union) Kotkas, Johannes (1/1)
1953	(Soviet Union)	(Soviet Union) Gurevich, Boris Maksovich (2/3)	(Soviet Union) Teryan, Artem (1/1)	(Sweden) Anderberg, Olle (2/2)	(Sweden) Freij, Gustav (2/2)	(Soviet Union) Shatvoryan, Gurgen (1/1)	(Soviet Union) Kartozia, Givi (1/4)	(Soviet Union) Englas, August (1/1)	(Sweden) Antonsson, Bertil (2/2)
1954	N/A	No Championships Held							
1955	(Soviet Union)	(Italy) Fabra, Ignazio (1/1)	(Soviet Union) Stashkevich, Vladimir (1/1)	(Hungary) Polyák, Imre (1/4)	(Soviet Union) Garmanik, Grigori (1/1)	(Soviet Union) Maneyev, Vladimir (1/1)	(Soviet Union) Kartozia, Givi (2/4)	(Soviet Union) Nikolayev, Valentin (1/2)	(Soviet Union) Masur, Aleksandr (1/1)
1956	(Soviet Union)	(Soviet Union) Solovyov, Nikolai (1/1)	(Soviet Union) Vyrupayev, Konstantin (1/1)	(Finland) Mäkinen, Rauno (1/1)	(Finland) Lehtonen, Kyösti (1/1)	(Turkey) Bayrak, Mithat (1/2)	(Soviet Union) Kartozia, Givi (3/4)	(Soviet Union) Nikolayev, Valentin (2/2)	(Soviet Union) Parfenov, Anatoli (1/1)
1957	N/A	No Championships Held							
1958	(Soviet Union)	(Soviet Union) Gurevich, Boris Maksovich (3/3)	(Soviet Union) Karavayev, Oleg (1/3)	(Hungary) Polyák, Imre (2/4)	(Turkey) Doğan, Rıza (1/1)	(Turkey) Ayvaz, Kazim (1/3)	(Soviet Union) Kartozia, Givi (4/4)	(Soviet Union) Abashidze, Rostom (1/3)	(Soviet Union) Bogdan, Ivan (1/3)
1959	N/A	No Championships Held							
1960	(Soviet Union)	(Romania) Pârvulescu, Dumitru (1/1)	(Soviet Union) Karavayev, Oleg (2/3)	(Turkey) Sille, Müzahir (1/1)	(Soviet Union) Koridze, Avtandil (1/2)	(Turkey) Bayrak, Mithat (2/2)	(Bulgaria) Dobrev, Dimitar (1/1)	(Turkey) Kis, Tevfik (1/3)	(Soviet Union) Bogdan, Ivan (2/3)
1961	(Soviet Union)	(Soviet Union) Sayadov, Armais (1/1)	(Soviet Union) Karavayev, Oleg (3/3)	(Egypt) Mansour, Moustafa Hamid (1/1)	(Soviet Union) Koridze, Avtandil (2/2)	(Romania) Bularca, Valeriu (1/1)	(Soviet Union) Zenin, Vasili (1/1)	(Hungary) Gurics, György (1/1)	(Soviet Union) Bogdan, Ivan (3/3)
1962	(Soviet Union)	(Soviet Union) Rybalko, Sergey (1/2)	(Japan) Ichiguchi, Masamitsu (1/2)	(Hungary) Polyák, Imre (3/4)	(Turkey) Ayvaz, Kazim (2/3)	(Soviet Union) Kolesov, Anatoly (1/4)	(Turkey) Kis, Tevfik (2/3)	(Soviet Union) Abashidze, Rostom (2/3)	(Hungary) Kozma, István (1/5)
1963	(Soviet Union)	(Socialist Federal Republic of Yugoslavia) Vukov, Borivoje (1/1)	(Hungary) Varga, Janos (1/3)	(Soviet Union) Sapunov, Gennady (1/2)	(Socialist Federal Republic of Yugoslavia) Horvat, Stevan (1/2)	(Soviet Union) Kolesov, Anatoly (2/4)	(Turkey) Kis, Tevfik (3/3)	(Soviet Union) Abashidze, Rostom (3/3)	(Soviet Union) Roshchin, Anatoly (1/4)
1964	(Soviet Union)	(Japan) Hanahara, Tsotumu (1/1)	(Japan) Ichiguchi, Masamitsu (2/2)	(Hungary) Polyák, Imre (4/4)	(Turkey) Ayvaz, Kazim (3/3)	(Soviet Union) Kolesov, Anatoly (3/4)	(Socialist Federal Republic of Yugoslavia) Simić, Branislav (1/1)	(Bulgaria) Radev, Boyan (1/3)	(Hungary) Kozma, István (2/5)
1965	(Soviet Union)	(Soviet Union) Rybalko, Sergey (2/2)	(Romania) Cernea, Ion (1/1)	(Soviet Union) Grigoriev, Yury (1/1)	(Soviet Union) Sapunov, Gennady (2/2)	(Soviet Union) Kolesov, Anatoly (4/4)	(Soviet Union) Bagdonas, Rimantes (1/1)	(Soviet Union) Anisimov, Valery (1/1)	(Soviet Union) Shumakov, Nikolay (1/1)
1966	(Soviet Union)	(Bulgaria) Kerezov, Angel (1/1)	(West Germany) Stange, Fritz (1/1)	(Soviet Union) Rurua, Roman (1/5)	(Socialist Federal Republic of Yugoslavia) Horvat, Stevan (2/2)	(Soviet Union) Igumenov, Viktor (1/5)	(Soviet Union) Oleynik, Valentin (1/1)	(Bulgaria) Radev, Boyan (2/3)	(Hungary) Kozma, István (3/5)
1967	(Soviet Union)	(Soviet Union) Bakulin, Vladimir (1/1)	(Romania) Baciu, Ion (1/1)	(Soviet Union) Rurua, Roman (2/5)	(Finland) Tapio, Eero (1/1)	(Soviet Union) Igumenov, Viktor (2/5)	(Hungary) Sillai, Laszlo (1/1)	(Soviet Union) Yakovenko, Nikolai (1/2)	(Hungary) Kozma, István (4/5)
1968	(Soviet Union)	(Bulgaria) Kirov, Petar (1/5)	(Hungary) Varga, János (2/3)	(Soviet Union) Rurua, Roman (3/5)	(Japan) Munemura, Muneji (1/1)	(East Germany) Vesper, Rudolf (1/1)	(East Germany) Metz, Lothar (1/1)	(Bulgaria) Radev, Boyan (3/3)	(Hungary) Kozma, István (5/5)

=== 1969–1996 ===
Year	Team	48 kg	52 kg	57 kg	62 kg	68 kg	74 kg	82 kg	90 kg	100 kg	100+ kg (−1984), 130 kg (1985–1996)
1969	(Soviet Union)	(Romania) Berceanu, Gheorghe (1/3)	(Iran) Alizadeh, Firouz (1/1)	(Soviet Union) Kazakov, Rustam (1/3)	(Soviet Union) Rurua, Roman (4/5)	(Romania) Popescu, Simion (1/1)	(Soviet Union) Igumenov, Viktor (3/5)	(Bulgaria) Krumov, Petar (1/1)	(Soviet Union) Yurkevich, Aleksandr (1/1)	(Soviet Union) Yakovenko, Nikolai (2/2)	(Soviet Union) Roshchin, Anatoly (2/4)
1970	(Soviet Union)	(Romania) Berceanu, Gheorghe (2/3)	(Bulgaria) Kirov, Petar (2/5)	(Hungary) Varga, János (3/3)	(Japan) Fujimoto, Hideo (1/1)	(Soviet Union) Rurua, Roman (5/5)	(Soviet Union) Igumenov, Viktor (4/5)	(Soviet Union) Nazarenko, Anatoly (1/3)	(Soviet Union) Rezantsev, Valery (1/7)	(Sweden) Svensson, Pelle (1/2)	(Soviet Union) Roshchin, Anatoly (3/4)
1971	(Bulgaria)	(Soviet Union) Zubkov, Vladimir (1/4)	(Bulgaria) Kirov, Petar (3/5)	(Soviet Union) Kazakov, Rustam (2/3)	(Bulgaria) Markov, Georgi (1/2)	(Socialist Federal Republic of Yugoslavia) Damjanovic, Sreten (1/1)	(Soviet Union) Igumenov, Viktor (5/5)	(Hungary) Hegedűs, Csaba (1/2)	(Soviet Union) Rezantsev, Valery (2/7)	(Sweden) Svensson, Pelle (2/2)	(Bulgaria) Tomov, Aleksandar (1/5)
1972	(Soviet Union)	(Romania) Berceanu, Gheorghe (3/3)	(Bulgaria) Kirov, Petar (4/5)	(Soviet Union) Kazakov, Rustam (3/3)	(Bulgaria) Markov, Georgi (2/2)	(Soviet Union) Khisamutdinov, Shamil (1/3)	(Czechoslovakia) Mácha, Vítězslav (1/3)	(Hungary) Hegedűs, Csaba (2/2)	(Soviet Union) Rezantsev, Valery (3/7)	(Romania) Martinescu, Nicolae (1/1)	(Soviet Union) Roshchin, Anatoly (4/4)
1973	(Soviet Union)	(Soviet Union) Zubkov, Vladimir (2/4)	(Romania) Ginga, Nicu (1/2)	(Poland) Lipień, Józef (1/1)	(Poland) Lipień, Kazimierz (1/3)	(Soviet Union) Khisamutdinov, Shamil (2/3)	(Bulgaria) Kolev, Ivan (1/1)	(Soviet Union) Liberman, Leonid (1/1)	(Soviet Union) Rezantsev, Valery (4/7)	(Soviet Union) Balboshin, Nikolai (1/6)	(Bulgaria) Tomov, Aleksandar (2/5)
1974	(Soviet Union)	(Soviet Union) Zubkov, Vladimir (3/4)	(Bulgaria) Kirov, Petar (5/5)	(Soviet Union) Mustafin, Farhat (1/2)	(Poland) Lipień, Kazimierz (1/3)	(Soviet Union) Davydyan, Nelson (1/2)	(Czechoslovakia) Mácha, Vítězslav (2/3)	(Soviet Union) Nazarenko, Anatoly (2/3)	(Soviet Union) Rezantsev, Valery (5/7)	(Soviet Union) Balboshin, Nikolai (2/6)	(Bulgaria) Tomov, Aleksandar (3/5)
1975	(Soviet Union)	(Soviet Union) Zubkov, Vladimir (4/4)	(Soviet Union) Konstantinov, Vitali (1/2)	(Soviet Union) Mustafin, Farhat (2/2)	(Soviet Union) Davydyan, Nelson (2/2)	(Soviet Union) Khisamutdinov, Shamil (3/3)	(Soviet Union) Bykov, Anatoly (1/2)	(Soviet Union) Nazarenko, Anatoly (3/3)	(Soviet Union) Rezantsev, Valery (6/7)	(Bulgaria) Goranov, Kamen (1/1)	(Bulgaria) Tomov, Aleksandar (4/5)
1976	(Soviet Union)	(Soviet Union) Shumakov, Alexei (1/2)	(Soviet Union) Konstantinov, Vitali (2/2)	(Finland) Ukkola, Pertti (2/2)	(Poland) Lipień, Kazimierz (3/3)	(Soviet Union) Nalbandyan, Suren (2/2)	(Soviet Union) Bykov, Anatoly (2/2)	(Socialist Federal Republic of Yugoslavia) Petković, Momir (1/1)	(Soviet Union) Rezantsev, Valery (7/7)	(Soviet Union) Balboshin, Nikolai (3/6)	(Soviet Union) Kolchinsky, Alexander (1/3)
1977	(Soviet Union)	(Soviet Union) Shumakov, Alexei (2/2)	(Romania) Ginga, Nicu (2/2)	(Finland) Ukkola, Pertti (2/2)	(Hungary) Reczi, Laszlo (1/1)	(East Germany) Wehling, Heinz-Helmut (1/1)	(Czechoslovakia) Mácha, Vítězslav (3/3)	(Soviet Union) Cheboksarov, Vladimir (1/1)	(Sweden) Andersson, Frank (1/3)	(Soviet Union) Balboshin, Nikolai (4/6)	(Bulgaria) Dinev, Nikola (1/2)
1978	(Soviet Union)	(Romania) Alexandru, Constantin (1/2)	(Soviet Union) Blagidze, Vakhtang (1/3)	(Soviet Union) Serikov, Shamil (1/3)	(Soviet Union) Kramorenko, Boris (1/1)	(Romania) Rusu, Ștefan (1/3)	(Soviet Union) Niftullayev, Arif (1/1)	(Romania) Draica, Ion (1/2)	(Bulgaria) Ivanov, Stoyan (1/1)	(Soviet Union) Balboshin, Nikolai (5/6)	(Soviet Union) Kolchinsky, Alexander (2/3)
1979	(Soviet Union)	(Romania) Alexandru, Constantin (2/2)	(Hungary) Racz, Lajos (1/1)	(Soviet Union) Serikov, Shamil (2/3)	(Hungary) Tóth, István (1/2)	(Poland) Supron, Andrzej (1/1)	(Hungary) Kocsis, Ferenc (1/2) & (Bulgaria) Shopov, Yanko (1/1)	(Soviet Union) Korban, Gennadi (1/3)	(Sweden) Andersson, Frank (2/3)	(Soviet Union) Balboshin, Nikolai (6/6)	(Bulgaria) Tomov, Aleksandar (5/5)
1980	(Soviet Union)	(Soviet Union) Ushkempirov, Zhaksylyk (1/2)	(Soviet Union) Blagidze, Vakhtang (2/3)	(Soviet Union) Serikov, Shamil (3/3)	(Greece) Mygiakis, Stelios (1/1)	(Romania) Rusu, Ștefan (2/3)	(Hungary) Kocsis, Ferenc (2/2)	(Soviet Union) Korban, Gennadi (2/3)	(Hungary) Növényi, Norbert (1/1)	(Bulgaria) Raikov, Georgi (1/1)	(Soviet Union) Kolchinsky, Alexander (3/3)
1981	(Soviet Union)	(Soviet Union) Ushkempirov, Zhaksylyk (2/2)	(Soviet Union) Blagidze, Vakhtang (3/3)	(West Germany) Passarelli, Pasquale (1/2)	(Hungary) Tóth, István (2/2)	(Soviet Union) Ermilov, Gennady (1/2)	(Soviet Union) Kudryavtsev, Aleksandr (1/1)	(Soviet Union) Korban, Gennady (3/3)	(Soviet Union) Kanygin, Igor (1/2)	(Soviet Union) Saladze, Mikhail (1/1)	(Socialist Federal Republic of Yugoslavia) Memišević, Refik (1/1)
1982	(Soviet Union)	(Soviet Union) Kasarashvili, Temo (1/1)	(Soviet Union) Pashayan, Benur (1/2)	(Poland) Michalik, Piotr (1/1)	(Poland) Świerad, Ryszard (1/1)	(Soviet Union) Ermilov, Gennady (2/2)	(Romania) Rusu, Ștefan (3/3)	(Soviet Union) Apkhazava, Taymuraz (1/2)	(Sweden) Andersson, Frank (3/3)	(Poland) Wrocławski, Roman (1/1)	(Bulgaria) Dinev, Nikola (2/2)
1983	(Soviet Union)	(Bulgaria) Tsenov, Bratan (1/1)	(Soviet Union) Pashayan, Benur (2/2)	(Japan) Eto, Masaki (1/1)	(Finland) Lahtinen, Hannu (1/1)	(Finland) Sipilä, Tapio (1/1)	(Soviet Union) Mamiashvili, Mikhail (1/4)	(Soviet Union) Apkhazava, Taymuraz (2/2)	(Soviet Union) Kanygin, Igor (2/2)	(Bulgaria) Dimitrov, Andrey (1/2)	(Soviet Union) Artyukhin, Evgeny (1/1)
1984	(United States)	(Italy) Maenza, Vincenzo (1/2)	(Japan) Miyahara, Atsuji (1/1)	(West Germany) Passarelli, Pasquale (2/2)	(South Korea) Kim, Weon-kee (1/1)	(Socialist Federal Republic of Yugoslavia) Lisjak, Vlado (1/1)	(Finland) Salomäki, Jouko (1/2)	(Romania) Draica, Ion (2/2)	(United States) Fraser, Steve (1/1)	(Romania) Andrei, Vasile (1/1)	(United States) Blatnick Jeff (1/1)
1985	(Soviet Union)	(Soviet Union) Allahverdiyev, Mahaddin (1/3)	(Norway) Rønningen, Jon (1/3)	(Bulgaria) Balov, Stoyan (1/1)	(Bulgaria) Vangelov, Zhivko (1/1)	(Romania) Negrisan, Stefan (1/1)	(Soviet Union) Mamiashvili, Mikhail (2/4)	(Poland) Daras, Bogdan (1/2)	(United States) Houck, Michael (1/1)	(Bulgaria) Dimitrov, Andrey (2/2)	(Soviet Union) Rostorotsky, Igor (1/2)
1986	(Soviet Union)	(Soviet Union) Allahverdiyev, Mahaddin (2/3)	(Soviet Union) Dydyaev, Sergey (1/1)	(Bulgaria) Ivanov, Emil (1/2)	(Soviet Union) Madzhidov, Kamandar (1/3)	(Soviet Union) Julfalakyan, Levon (1/2)	(Soviet Union) Mamiashvili, Mikhail (3/4)	(Poland) Daras, Bogdan (2/2) & (Hungary) Komaromi, Tibor (1/3)	(Poland) Malina, Andrzej (1/1)	(Hungary) Gáspár, Tamás (1/1)	(Sweden) Johansson, Tomas (1/1)
1987	(Soviet Union)	(Soviet Union) Allahverdiyev, Mahaddin (3/3)	(Cuba) Roque, Pedro (1/1)	(France) Mourier, Patrice (1/1)	(Bulgaria) Vangelov, Zhivko (2/2)	(Soviet Union) Abaeev, Aslaudin (1/1)	(Finland) Salomäki, Jouko (2/2)	(Hungary) Komaromi, Tibor (2/3)	(Soviet Union) Popov, Vladimir (1/1)	(Soviet Union) Gedekhauri, Guram (1/1)	(Soviet Union) Rostorotsky, Igor (2/2)
1988	(Soviet Union)	(Italy) Maenza, Vincenzo (2/2)	(Norway) Rønningen, Jon (2/3)	(Hungary) Sike, András (1/1)	(Soviet Union) Madzhidov, Kamandar (2/3)	(Soviet Union) Julfalakyan, Levon (2/2)	(South Korea) Kim, Young-nam (1/1)	(Soviet Union) Mamiashvili, Mikhail (4/4)	(Bulgaria) Komchev, Atanas (1/1)	(Poland) Wroński, Andrzej (1/3)	(Soviet Union) Karelin, Aleksandr (1/12)
1989	(Soviet Union)	(Soviet Union) Kucherenko, Oleg (1/3)	(Soviet Union) Ignatenko, Alexander (1/2)	(Bulgaria) Ivanov, Emil (2/2)	(Soviet Union) Madzhidov, Kamandar (3/3)	(Germany) Passarelli, Claudio (1/1)	(Soviet Union) Turlykhanov, Daulet (1/1)	(Hungary) Komaromi, Tibor (3/3)	(East Germany) Bullmann, Maik (1/4)	(Germany) Himmel, Gerhard (1/1)	(Soviet Union) Karelin, Aleksandr (2/12)
1990	(Soviet Union)	(Soviet Union) Kucherenko, Oleg (2/3)	(Soviet Union) Ignatenko, Alexander (2/2)	(Germany) Yildiz, Rifat (1/2)	(Cuba) Olivera, Mario (1/1)	(Soviet Union) Dugushiev, Islam (1/4)	(Soviet Union) Iskandaryan, Mnatsakan (1/4)	(Hungary) Farkas, Péter (1/3)	(East Germany) Bullmann, Maik (2/4)	(Soviet Union) Demyashkevich, Sergey (1/1)	(Soviet Union) Karelin, Aleksandr (3/12)
1991	(Soviet Union)	(South Korea) Goun, Duk-yong (1/1)	(Cuba) Martínez, Raúl (1/2)	(Germany) Yildiz, Rifat (2/2)	(Soviet Union) Martynov, Sergey (1/4)	(Soviet Union) Dugushiev, Islam (2/4)	(Soviet Union) Iskandaryan, Mnatsakan (2/4)	(Hungary) Farkas, Péter (2/3)	(Germany) Bullmann, Maik (3/4)	(Cuba) Milián, Héctor (1/2)	(Soviet Union) Karelin, Aleksandr (4/12)
1992	Unified Team at the Olympics	Kucherenko, Oleg (3/3)	(Norway) Rønningen, Jon (3/3)	(South Korea) An, Han-bong (1/1)	(Turkey) Akif Pirim, Mehmet (1/1)	(Hungary) Repka, Attila (1/1)	Iskandaryan, Mnatsakan (3/4)	(Hungary) Farkas, Péter (3/3)	(Germany) Bullmann, Maik (4/4)	(Cuba) Milián, Héctor (2/2)	Karelin, Aleksandr (5/12)
1993	(Russia)	(Cuba) Sánchez, Wilber (1/2)	(Cuba) Martínez, Raúl (2/2)	(Armenia) Manukyan, Aghasi (1/2)	(Russia) Martynov, Sergey (2/4)	(Russia) Dugushiev, Islam (3/4)	(Cuba) Almanza, Néstor (1/1)	(Turkey) Yerlikaya, Hamza (1/5)	(Russia) Koguashvili, Gogi (1/5)	(Sweden) Ljungberg, Mikael (1/3)	(Russia) Karelin, Aleksandr (6/12)
1994	(Russia)	(Cuba) Sánchez, Wilber (2/2)	(Germany) Ter-Mkrtchyan, Alfred (1/1)	(Kazakhstan) Melnichenko, Yuriy (1/3)	(Russia) Martynov, Sergey (3/4)	(Russia) Dugushiev, Islam (4/4)	(Russia) Iskandaryan, Mnatsakan (4/4)	(Germany) Zander, Thomas (1/1)	(Russia) Koguashvili, Gogi (2/5)	(Poland) Wroński, Andrzej (2/3)	(Russia) Karelin, Aleksandr (7/12)
1995	(Russia)	(South Korea) Sim, Kwon-ho (1/4)	(Russia) Danielyan, Samvel (1/1)	(United States) Hall, Dennis (1/1)	(Russia) Martynov, Sergey (4/4)	(Ukraine) Adzhi, Rustam (1/1)	(France) Riemer, Yvon (1/1)	(Turkey) Yerlikaya, Hamza (2/5)	(Turkey) Hakkı, Hakkı (1/1)	(Sweden) Ljungberg, Mikael (2/3)	(Russia) Karelin, Aleksandr (8/12)
1996	(Poland)	(South Korea) Sim, Kwon-ho (2/4)	(Armenia) Nazaryan, Armen (1/5)	(Kazakhstan) Melnichenko, Yuriy (2/3)	(Poland) Zawadzki, Włodzimierz (1/1)	(Poland) Wolny, Ryszard (1/1)	(Cuba) Azcuy, Filiberto (1/3)	(Turkey) Yerlikaya, Hamza (3/5)	(Ukraine) Oleynyk, Vyacheslav (1/1)	(Poland) Wroński, Andrzej (3/3)	(Russia) Karelin, Aleksandr (9/12)

=== 1997–2001 ===
Year	Team	54 kg	58 kg	63 kg	69 kg	76 kg	85 kg	97 kg	130 kg
1997	(Russia)	(Turkey) Yıldız, Ercan (1/1)	(Kazakhstan) Melnichenko, Yuriy (3/3)	(Turkey) Eroğlu, Şeref (1/1)	(South Korea) Son, Sang-pil (1/2)	(Finland) Yli-Hannuksela, Marko (1/1)	(Russia) Tsvir, Sergey (1/1)	(Russia) Koguashvili, Gogi (3/5)	(Russia) Karelin, Aleksandr (10/12)
1998	(Russia)	(South Korea) Sim, Kwon-ho (3/4)	(South Korea) Kim, In-sub (1/2)	(Kazakhstan) Manukyan, Mkhitar (1/2)	(Russia) Tretyakov, Aleksandr (1/1)	(Kazakhstan) Baiseitov, Bakhtiyar (1/1)	(Russia) Menshchikov, Aleksandr (1/1)	(Russia) Koguashvili, Gogi (4/5)	(Russia) Karelin, Aleksandr (11/12)
1999	(Russia)	(Cuba) Rivas, Lázaro (1/1)	(South Korea) Kim, In-sub (2/2)	(Kazakhstan) Manukyan, Mkhitar (2/2)	(South Korea) Son, Sang-pil (2/2)	(Turkey) Avluca, Nazmi (1/2)	(Cuba) Méndez, Luis Enrique (1/1)	(Russia) Koguashvili, Gogi (5/5)	(Russia) Karelin, Aleksandr (12/12)
2000	(Russia)	(South Korea) Sim, Kwon-ho (4/4)	(Bulgaria) Nazaryan, Armen (2/5)	(Russia) Samourgachev, Varteres (1/3)	(Cuba) Azcuy, Filiberto (2/3)	(Russia) Kardanov, Murat (1/1)	(Turkey) Yerlikaya, Hamza (4/5)	(Sweden) Ljungberg, Mikael (3/3)	(United States) Gardner, Rulon (1/2)
2001	(Cuba)	(Iran) Rangraz, Hassan (1/1)	(Uzbekistan) Aripov, Dilshod (1/1)	(Armenia) Galstyan, Vaghinak (1/1)	(Cuba) Azcuy, Filiberto (3/3)	(Sweden) Abrahamian, Ara (1/2)	(Georgia (country)) Vakhtangadze, Mukhran (1/1)	(Russia) Bezruchkin, Alexander (1/1)	(United States) Gardner, Rulon (2/2)

=== 2002–2013 ===
Year	Team	55 kg	60 kg	66 kg	74 kg	84 kg	96 kg	120 kg
2002	(Russia)	(Russia) Mamedaliyev, Geidar (1/1)	(Bulgaria) Nazaryan, Armen (3/5)	(Sweden) Samuelsson, Jimmy (1/1)	(Russia) Samourgachev, Varteres (2/3)	(Sweden) Abrahamian, Ara (2/2)	(Turkey) Özal, Mehmet (1/1)	(United States) Byers, Dremiel (1/1)
2003	(Georgia (country))	(Poland) Jabłoński, Dariusz (1/1)	(Bulgaria) Nazaryan, Armen (4/5)	(Georgia (country)) Kvirkelia, Manuchar (2/2)	(Russia) Glushkov, Aleksei (1/1)	(Israel) Tsitsiashvili, Gocha (1/1)	(Sweden) Lidberg, Martin (1/1)	(Russia) Baroev, Khasan (1/3)
2004	(Russia)	(Hungary) Majoros, István (1/1)	(South Korea) Jung, Ji-hyun (1/1)	(Azerbaijan) Mansurov, Farid (1/3)	(Uzbekistan) Dokturishvili, Aleksandr (1/1)	(Russia) Mishin, Aleksei (1/2)	(Egypt) Gaber, Karam (1/1)	(Russia) Baroev, Khasan (2/3)
2005	(Hungary)	(Iran) Sourian, Hamid (1/7)	(Bulgaria) Nazaryan, Armen (5/5)	(Bulgaria) Gergov, Nikolay (1/1)	(Russia) Samourgachev, Varteres (3/3)	(Belarus) Selimau, Alim (1/2)	(Turkey) Yerlikaya, Hamza (5/5)	(Cuba) López, Mijaín (1/10)
2006	(Turkey)	(Iran) Sourian, Hamid (2/7)	(United States) Warren, Joe (1/1)	(China) Li, Yanyan (1/1)	(Ukraine) Shatskykh, Volodimir (1/1)	(Egypt) Abdelfatah, Mohamed (1/1)	(Estonia) Nabi, Heiki (1/2)	(Russia) Baroev, Khasan (3/3)
2007	(United States)	(Iran) Sourian, Hamid (3/7)	(Georgia (country)) Bedinadze, David (1/1)	(Azerbaijan) Mansurov, Farid (2/3)	(Bulgaria) Yanakiev, Yavor (1/1)	(Russia) Mishin, Aleksei (2/2)	(Georgia (country)) Nozadze, Ramaz (1/1)	(Cuba) López, Mijaín (2/10)
2008	(Russia)	(Russia) Mankiev, Nazyr (1/1)	(Russia) Albiev, Islambek (2/2)	(France) Guenot, Steeve (1/1)	(Georgia (country)) Kvirkelia, Manuchar (2/2)	(Italy) Minguzzi, Andrea (1/1)	(Russia) Khushtov, Aslanbek (1/1)	(Cuba) López, Mijaín (3/10)
2009	(Turkey)	(Iran) Sourian, Hamid (4/7)	(Russia) Albiev, Islambek (2/2)	(Azerbaijan) Mansurov, Farid (3/3)	(Turkey) Çebi, Selçuk (1/3)	(Turkey) Avluca, Nazmi (2/2)	(Hungary) Kiss, Balázs (1/1)	(Cuba) López, Mijaín (4/10)
2010	(Russia)	(Iran) Sourian, Hamid (5/7)	(Azerbaijan) Aliyev, Hasan (1/1)	(Russia) Vachadze, Ambako (1/1)	(Turkey) Çebi, Selçuk (2/3)	(Bulgaria) Marinov, Hristo (1/1)	(Iran) Ali-Akbari, Amir (1/1)	(Cuba) López, Mijaín (5/10)
2011	(Russia)	(Azerbaijan) Bayramov, Rovshan (1/1)	(Iran) Norouzi, Omid (1/2)	(Iran) Abdevali, Saeid (1/1)	(Russia) Vlasov, Roman (1/5)	(Belarus) Selimau, Alim (2/2)	(Bulgaria) Guri, Elis (1/1)	(Turkey) Kayaalp, Rıza (1/5)
2012	(Iran)	(Iran) Sourian, Hamid (6/7)	(Iran) Norouzi, Omid (2/2)	(South Korea) Kim, Hyeon-woo (1/2)	(Russia) Vlasov, Roman (2/5)	(Russia) Khugaev, Alan (1/1)	(Iran) Rezaei, Ghasem (1/1)	(Cuba) López, Mijaín (6/10)
2013	(Russia)	(North Korea) Yun, Won-chol (1/1)	(Bulgaria) Angelov, Ivo (1/1)	(South Korea) Ryu, Han-su (1/2)	(South Korea) Kim, Hyeon-woo (2/2)	(Iran) Nematpour, Taleb (1/1)	(Russia) Melnikov, Nikita (1/1)	(Estonia) Nabi, Heiki (2/2)

=== 2014–2017 ===
Year	Team	59 kg	66 kg	71 kg	75 kg	80 kg	85 kg	98 kg	130 kg
2014	(Iran)	(Iran) Sourian, Hamid (7/7)	(Serbia) Štefanek, Davor (1/2)	(Russia) Labazanov, Chingiz (1/1)	(Armenia) Julfalakyan, Arsen (1/1)	(Hungary) Bácsi, Péter (1/2)	(France) Noumonvi, Mélonin (1/1)	(Armenia) Aleksanyan, Artur (1/5)	(Cuba) López, Mijaín (7/10)
2015	(Azerbaijan)	(Cuba) Borrero, Ismael (1/3)	(Germany) Stäbler, Frank (1/3)	(Azerbaijan) Chunayev, Rasul (1/1)	(Russia) Vlasov, Roman (3/5)	(Turkey) Çebi, Selçuk (3/3)	(Ukraine) Beleniuk, Zhan (1/3)	(Armenia) Aleksanyan, Artur (2/5)	(Turkey) Kayaalp, Rıza (2/5)
2016	(Cuba)	(Cuba) Borrero, Ismael (2/3)	(Serbia) Štefanek, Davor (2/2)	(Hungary) Korpasi, Balint (1/1)	(Russia) Vlasov, Roman (4/5)	(Russia) Abacharaev, Ramazan (1/1)	(Russia) Chakvetadze, Davit (1/1)	(Armenia) Aleksanyan, Artur (3/5)	(Cuba) López, Mijaín (8/10)
2017	(Russia)	(Japan) Fumita, Kenichiro (1/3)	(South Korea) Ryu, Han-su (2/2)	(Germany) Stäbler, Frank (2/3)	(Serbia) Nemeš, Viktor (1/1)	(Armenia) Manukyan, Maksim (1/1)	(Turkey) Başar, Metehan (1/2)	(Armenia) Aleksanyan, Artur (4/5)	(Turkey) Kayaalp, Rıza (3/5)

=== 2018–2019 ===
Year	Team	55 kg	60 kg	63 kg	67 kg	72 kg	77 kg	82 kg	87 kg	97 kg	130 kg
2018	(Russia)	(Azerbaijan) Azizli, Eldaniz (1/5)	(Russia) Emelin, Sergey (1/1)	(Russia) Maryanyan, Stepan (1/1)	(Russia) Surkov, Artem (1/1)	(Germany) Stäbler, Frank (3/3)	(Russia) Chekhirkin, Aleksandr (1/1)	(Hungary) Bácsi, Péter (2/2)	(Turkey) Başar, Metehan (2/2)	(Russia) Evloev, Musa (1/3)	(Russia) Semenov, Sergey (1/1)
2019	(Russia)	(Georgia (country)) Tsurtsumia, Nugzari (1/1)	(Japan) Fumita, Kenichiro (2/3)	(Japan) Ota, Shinobu (1/1)	(Cuba) Borrero, Ismael (3/3)	(Russia) Mantsigov, Abuyazid (1/1)	(Hungary) Lőrincz, Tamás (1/2)	(Georgia (country)) Gobadze, Lasha (1/1)	(Ukraine) Beleniuk, Zhan (2/3)	(Russia) Evloev, Musa (2/3)	(Turkey) Kayaalp, Rıza (4/5)

=== 2021 ===
Year	Team	60 kg	67 kg	77 kg	87 kg	97 kg	130 kg
2021	(Cuba)	(Cuba) Orta, Luis (1/2)	(Iran) Geraei, Mohammad Reza (1/2)	(Hungary) Lőrincz, Tamás (2/2)	(Ukraine) Beleniuk, Zhan (3/3)	(Russia) Evloev, Musa (3/3)	(Cuba) López, Mijaín (9/10)

=== 2021–2025 ===
Year	Team	55 kg	60 kg	63 kg	67 kg	72 kg	77 kg	82 kg	87 kg	97 kg	130 kg
2021	(Russia)	(Japan) Matsui, Ken (1/1)	(Moldova) Ciobanu, Victor (1/1)	(Iran) Dalkhani, Meisam (1/1)	(Iran) Geraei, Mohammad Reza (2/2)	(Armenia) Amoyan, Malkhas (1/1)	(Russia) Vlasov, Roman (5/5)	(Azerbaijan) Huseynov, Rafig (1/2)	(Serbia) Datunashvili, Zurabi (1/2)	(Iran) Saravi, Mohammad Hadi (1/3)	(Iran) Yousefi, Ali Akbar (1/1)
2022	(Turkey)	(Azerbaijan) Azizli, Eldaniz (2/5)	(Kyrgyzstan) Sharshenbekov, Zholaman (1/2)	(Serbia) Nađ, Sebastian (1/1)	(Serbia) Nemeš, Mate (1/1)	(Serbia) Arsalan, Ali (1/1)	(Kyrgyzstan) Makhmudov, Akzhol (1/2)	(Turkey) Akbudak, Burhan (1/1)	(Serbia) Datunashvili, Zurabi (2/2)	(Armenia) Aleksanyan, Artur (5/5)	(Turkey) Kayaalp, Rıza (5/5)
2023	(Azerbaijan)	(Azerbaijan) Azizli, Eldaniz (3/5)	(Kyrgyzstan) Sharshenbekov, Zholaman (2/2)	(Georgia (country)) Abuladze, Leri (1/1)	(Cuba) Orta, Luis (2/2)	(France) Ghanem, Ibrahim (1/1)	(Kyrgyzstan) Makhmudov, Akzhol (2/2)	(Azerbaijan) Huseynov, Rafig (2/2)	(Turkey) Cengiz, Ali (1/1) & (Hungary) Losonczi, Dávid (1/1)	(Cuba) Rosillo, Gabriel (1/1)	(Iran) Mirzazadeh, Amin (1/2)
2024	(Iran)	(Azerbaijan) Azizli, Eldaniz (4/5)	(Japan) Fumita, Kenichiro (3/3)	(Azerbaijan) Mammadli, Nihat (1/1)	(Iran) Esmaeili, Saeid (1/3)	(Azerbaijan) Ganizade, Ulvu (1/2)	(Japan) Kusaka, Nao (1/1)	(Iran) Geraei, Mohammad Ali (1/1)	(Bulgaria) Novikov, Semen (1/2)	(Iran) Saravi, Mohammad Hadi (2/3)	(Cuba) López, Mijaín (10/10)
2024	(Azerbaijan)	(Azerbaijan) Azizli, Eldaniz (4/5)	(Japan) Fumita, Kenichiro (3/3)	(Azerbaijan) Mammadli, Nihat (1/1)	(Iran) Esmaeili, Saeid (1/3)	(Azerbaijan) Ganizade, Ulvu (1/2)	(Japan) Kusaka, Nao (1/1)	(Iran) Geraei, Mohammad Ali (1/1)	(Bulgaria) Novikov, Semen (1/2)	(Iran) Saravi, Mohammad Hadi (2/3)	(Cuba) López, Mijaín (10/10)
2025	(Iran)	(Georgia (country)) Lolua, Vakhtang (1/1)	(Kazakhstan) Sultangali, Aidos (1/1)	(Uzbekistan) Khalmakhanov, Aytjan (1/1)	(Iran) Esmaeili, Saeid (2/3)	(Azerbaijan) Ganizade, Ulvu (2/2)	(Armenia) Amoyan, Malkhas (2/2)	(Iran) Farrokhi, Gholamreza (1/2)	(Serbia) Komarov, Aleksandr (1/1)	(Iran) Saravi, Mohammad Hadi (3/3)	(Iran) Mirzazadeh, Amin (2/2)
2026	(Iran)	(Azerbaijan) Azizli, Eldaniz (5/5)	(Japan) Gomi, Koto (1/1)	(Armenia) Aslanyan, Karen (1/1)	(Iran) Esmaeili, Saeid (3/3)	(Iran) Sohrabi, Danial (1/1)	(Azerbaijan) Suleymanov, Sanan (1/1)	(Iran) Farrokhi, Gholamreza (2/2)	(Bulgaria) Novikov, Semen (2/2)	(Belarus) Maskevich, Kirel (1/1)	(Iran) Hedayati, Fardin (1/1)

== Individual multiple-time World Level Champions ==
=== 12 World Level Championships ===
(Soviet Union) (Russia) Aleksandr Karelin, 1988–1999

=== 10 World Level Championships ===
(Cuba) Mijaín López, 2005–2024

=== 7 World Level Championships ===
(Soviet Union) Valery Rezantsev, 1970–1976

(Iran) Hamid Sourian, 2005–2014

=== 6 World Level Championships ===
(Soviet Union) Nikolai Balboshin, 1973–1979

=== 5 World Level Championships ===
(Hungary) István Kozma, 1962–1968

(Soviet Union) Roman Rurua, 1966–1970

(Soviet Union) Viktor Igumenov, 1966–1971

(Bulgaria) Petar Kirov, 1968–1974

(Bulgaria) Aleksandar Tomov, 1971–1979

(Russia) Gogi Koguashvili, 1993–1999

(Turkey) Hamza Yerlikaya, 1993–2005

(Armenia) (Bulgaria) Armen Nazaryan, 1996–2005

(Russia) (Russia) Roman Vlasov, 2011–2021

(Turkey) Rıza Kayaalp, 2011–2022

(Armenia) Artur Aleksanyan, 2014–2022

(Azerbaijan) Eldaniz Azizli, 2018–2026

== Team Championships ==
The list below includes unofficial championships won during the Olympic Games, although no official team statistics are kept during Olympic years.

=== 53 World Level Championships ===
(Soviet Union) / / (Russia) / (Russia) / (Russia) 1952–2021

=== 7 World Level Championships ===
(Sweden) 1908–1950

=== 5 World Level Championships ===
(Austria) / (Austria) 1904–1920

(Finland) / (Finland) 1911–1924

(Iran) 2012–2026

=== 4 World Level Championships ===
(Germany) / (Germany) 1896–1928

=== 3 World Level Championships ===
(Azerbaijan) 2015–2024

(Cuba) 2001–2021

(Turkey) 2006–2022

=== 2 World Level Championships ===
(United States) 1984–2007

=== 1 World Level Championship ===
(Denmark) 1907

(Bulgaria) 1971

(Poland) 1996

(Georgia (country)) 2003

(Hungary) 2005

== See also ==
- List of World and Olympic Champions in men's freestyle wrestling
- List of World and Olympic Champions in women's freestyle wrestling
- United States results in Greco-Roman wrestling

== Links ==
- FILA Wrestling Database
