= List of Unofficial World Championships medalists in wrestling =

This is the List of Unofficial World Championships medalists in men's Greco-Roman wrestling.

Several World Greco-Roman Championships had been held prior to creation of the creation of the International Amateur Wrestling Federation in 1921, the UWW considers those competitions as unofficial.

== Featherweight ==
- 60 kg: 1910–1920

Games	Gold	Silver	Bronze
1910 Düsseldorf	Karl Wernicke (GER)	Uwe Fricker (GER)	Jürgen Christian (GER)
1911 Helsinki	Antti Hyvönen (FIN)	Herman Parikka (FIN)	Vilhelm Lehmusvirta (FIN)
1911 Dresden	R. Walter (GER)	Georg Andersen (GER)	Hugo Haese (GER)
1911 Vienna	Heinrich Rauss (AUT)	Ferdinand Planegger (AUT)	Friedrich Scharrer (AUT)
1920 Vienna	Franz Reitmeier (GER)	József Pongrácz (HUN)	Gustav Boukal (AUT)

== Lightweight ==
- 75 kg: 1904
- 68 kg: 1905 (Berlin)
- 75 kg: 1905 (Duisburg)–1909
- 70 kg: 1910 (Düsseldorf)
- 75 kg: 1910 (Vienna)
- 67 kg: 1911 (Helsinki)
- 60 kg: 1911 (Stuttgart)–1911 (Berlin)
- 70 kg: 1911 (Dresden)–1911 (Vienna)
- 67.5 kg: 1913–1920

Games	Gold	Silver	Bronze
1904 Vienna	Severin Ahlquist (DEN)	Hans Schneider (GER)	Andreas Wolf (AUT)
1905 Berlin	Theodor Schibilski (GER)	Max Beeskow (GER)	Eugen Kissling (GER)
1905 Duisburg	Theodor Eckert (GER)	Alexander Biehler (GER)	Willy Schäfer (GER)
1907 Frankfurt	Christoph Übler (GER)	Uwe Volkert (GER)	Julius Fleischmann (GER)
1908 Vienna	Bob Diry (AUT)	Alois Toduschek (AUT)	Harald Christensen (DEN)
1909 Vienna	Alois Toduschek (AUT)	Bob Diry (AUT)	Andreas Mrosek (AUT)
1910 Düsseldorf	Fritz Altroggen (GER)	Hans Bauer (GER)	J. Gelot (NED)
1910 Vienna	Alois Toduschek (AUT)	Bob Diry (AUT)	Peter Kokotowitsch (AUT)
1911 Helsinki	Nestori Tuominen (FIN)	Gustaf Malmström (SWE)	Paul Tirkkonen (FIN)
1911 Stuttgart	Hans Lachnit (GER)	H. Kohler (GER)	Richard Kissling (GER)
1911 Berlin	Erich Kockel (GER)	Max Hippe (GER)	Hille (GER)
1911 Dresden	Georg Helgerth (GER)	Karl Günzel (GER)	Frederik Hansen (DEN)
1911 Vienna	Peter Kokotowitsch (AUT)	Andreas Mrosek (AUT)	Alfred Prinz (AUT)
1913 Breslau	Ewald Hegewald (GER)	Hugo Johansson (SWE)	Hermann Schulz (GER)
1920 Vienna	Ödön Radvány (HUN)	Rezső Péter (HUN)	Miklós Breznotics (HUN)

== Middleweight ==
- 80 kg: 1905 (Berlin)
- 85 kg: 1905 (Duisburg)–1910
- 73 kg: 1911 (Helsinki)
- 70 kg: 1911 (Stuttgart)–1911 (Berlin)
- 85 kg: 1911 (Dresden)–1911 (Vienna)
- 75 kg: 1913–1920

Games	Gold	Silver	Bronze
1905 Berlin	Albert Hein (GER)	Gustav Hede (GER)	Matthias Hartl (GER)
1905 Duisburg	Willi Dießner (GER)	Philip Schmitz (GER)	Otto Friedrich (GER)
1907 Frankfurt	Harald Christensen (DEN)	Johann Winker (GER)	Hugo Edingshaus (GER)
1910 Düsseldorf	Hermann Buchholz (GER)	Fritz Kärcher (GER)	Harald Christensen (DEN)
1911 Helsinki	Emil Väre (FIN)	Theodor Tirkkonen (FIN)	Alfred Salonen (FIN)
1911 Stuttgart	Jakob Hörger (GER)	H. Kettner (GER)	Franz Reitmeier (GER)
1911 Berlin	Axel Frank (SWE)	Hermann Schulz (GER)	Zeidlitz (GER)
1911 Dresden	Harald Christensen (DEN)	M. Meyer (NED)	J. Reindermann (NED)
1911 Vienna	Harald Christensen (DEN)	Karl Barl (AUT)	Johann Trestler (AUT)
1913 Breslau	Georg Baumann (RUS)	Edvin Fältström (SWE)	Heinrich Stiefel (GER)
1920 Vienna	Viktor Fischer (AUT)	Lorenz Koczanderle (AUT)	Philipp Heß (GER)

== Light heavyweight ==
- 83 kg: 1911 (Helsinki)
- 85 kg: 1911 (Stuttgart)–1911 (Berlin)
- 82.5 kg: 1913–1920

Games	Gold	Silver	Bronze
1911 Helsinki	Alfred Asikainen (FIN)	Anders Ahlgren (SWE)	Arvo Lumme (FIN)
1911 Stuttgart	Wilhelm Wied (GER)	Heinrich Bohlen (GER)	Karl Groß (GER)
1911 Berlin	Karl Paulini (GER)	Harald Christensen (DEN)	Wirrer (GER)
1913 Breslau	Ernst Nilsson (SWE)	Johann Trestler (AUT)	František Kopřiva (BOH)
1920 Vienna	Michael Heinl (AUT)	Josef Mach (AUT)	Wilhelm Knöpfle (GER)

== Heavyweight ==
- +75 kg: 1904
- +80 kg: 1905 (Berlin)
- +85 kg: 1905 (Duisburg)–1907
- +75 kg: 1908–1909
- +85 kg: 1910 (Düsseldorf)
- +75 kg: 1910 (Vienna)
- +83 kg: 1911 (Helsinki)
- +85 kg: 1911 (Stuttgart)–1911 (Vienna)
- +82.5 kg: 1913–1920

Games	Gold	Silver	Bronze
1904 Vienna	Rudolf Arnold (AUT)	Anton Schmitz (AUT)	Heinrich Wolfram (AUT)
1905 Berlin	Søren Marinus Jensen (DEN)	Georg Altmann (GER)	Paul Moldt (GER)
1905 Duisburg	Verner Weckman (FIN)	Friedrich Müller (GER)	Gustav Sperling (GER)
1907 Frankfurt	Hans Egeberg (DEN)	Heinrich Rondi (GER)	Gustav Sperling (GER)
1908 Vienna	Hans Egeberg (DEN)	Josef Rossum (AUT)	Josef Panzer (AUT)
1909 Vienna	Anton Schmitz (AUT)	Hans Egeberg (DEN)	Josef Bechyně (BOH)
1910 Düsseldorf	Gustav Sperling (GER)	Otto Büren (GER)	Søren Marinus Jensen (DEN)
1910 Vienna	Béla Varga (HUN)	Josef Rossum (AUT)	Ludwig Kossuth (AUT)
1911 Helsinki	Yrjö Saarela (FIN)	Adolf Lindfors (FIN)	Alex Järvinen (FIN)
1911 Stuttgart	Jakob Neser (GER)	Jean Hauptmanns (GER)	A. Laichinger (GER)
1911 Berlin	Alex Järvinen (FIN)	A. Lehmann (GER)	Anders Ahlgren (SWE)
1911 Dresden	Hermann Gäßler (GER)	Karl Hertel (GER)	Barend Bonneveld (NED)
1911 Vienna	Tibor Fischer (HUN)	Karl Freund (GER)	Franz Mileder (AUT)
1913 Breslau	Anders Ahlgren (SWE)	Jakob Neser (GER)	Karl Hertel (GER)
1920 Vienna	Heinrich Bock (GER)	Franz Wagner (AUT)	Adolf Kurz (GER)

== Medal table ==
Rank	Nation	Gold	Silver	Bronze	Total
1	Germany / Germany	21	26	24	71
2	Cisleithania / Austria	9	13	11	33
3	Grand Duchy of Finland	7	3	5	15
4	Denmark	7	2	4	13
5	Sweden	3	4	1	8
6	Hungary	3	2	1	6
7	Russia	1	0	0	1
8	Netherlands	0	1	3	4
9	Bohemia	0	0	2	2
Totals (9 entries)		51	51	51	153
