= Wrestling at the 1980 Summer Olympics – Men's Greco-Roman 62 kg =

Men's Greco-Roman 62 kg at the Games of the XXII Olympiad
- Venue: Central Sports Club of the Army
- Dates: 20–22 July 1980
- Competitors: 11 from 11 nations

Medalists
1st place, gold medalist(s)		Stelios Mygiakis	Greece
2nd place, silver medalist(s)		István Tóth	Hungary
3rd place, bronze medalist(s)		Boris Kramorenko	Soviet Union

The Men's Greco-Roman 62 kg at the 1980 Summer Olympics as part of the wrestling program were held at the Athletics Fieldhouse, Central Sports Club of the Army.

== Medalists ==
Gold	Stelios Mygiakis; Greece
Silver	István Tóth; Hungary
Bronze	Boris Kramorenko; Soviet Union

== Tournament results ==
The competition used a form of negative points tournament, with negative points given for any result short of a fall. Accumulation of 6 negative points eliminated the loser wrestler. When only three wrestlers remain, a special final round is used to determine the order of the medals.

Legend

- TF — Won by Fall
- IN — Won by Opponent Injury
- DQ — Won by Passivity
- D1 — Won by Passivity, the winner is passive too
- D2 — Both wrestlers lost by Passivity
- FF — Won by Forfeit
- DNA — Did not appear
- TPP — Total penalty points
- MPP — Match penalty points

Penalties

- 0 — Won by Fall, Technical Superiority, Passivity, Injury and Forfeit
- 0.5 — Won by Points, 8-11 points difference
- 1 — Won by Points, 1-7 points difference
- 2 — Won by Passivity, the winner is passive too
- 3 — Lost by Points, 1-7 points difference
- 3.5 — Lost by Points, 8-11 points difference
- 4 — Lost by Fall, Technical Superiority, Passivity, Injury and Forfeit

=== Round 1 ===
TPP	MPP		Score		MPP	TPP
4	4	Radwan Karout (SYR)	DQ / 5:37	Panayot Kirov (BUL)	0	0
0	0	István Tóth (HUN)	TF / 1:21	Sanay Ghulam (AFG)	4	4
1	1	Stelios Mygiakis (GRE)	4 - 2	Kazimierz Lipień (POL)	3	3
1	1	Lars Malmkvist (SWE)	4 - 2	Ion Păun (ROU)	3	3
4	4	Ivan Frgić (YUG)	1 - 19	Boris Kramorenko (URS)	0	0
0		Michal Vejsada (TCH)		Bye		

=== Round 2 ===
TPP	MPP		Score		MPP	TPP
4	4	Michal Vejsada (TCH)	TF / 2:14	Radwan Karout (SYR)	0	4
4	4	Panaiot Kirov (BUL)	D1 / 7:00	István Tóth (HUN)	2	2
8	4	Sanay Ghulam (AFG)	DQ / 3:28	Stelios Mygiakis (GRE)	0	1
3	0	Kazimierz Lipień (POL)	DQ / 5:29	Lars Malmkvist (SWE)	4	5
7	4	Ion Păun (ROU)	DQ / 6:54	Ivan Frgić (YUG)	0	4
0		Boris Kramorenko (URS)		Bye		

=== Round 3 ===
TPP	MPP		Score		MPP	TPP
0	0	Boris Kramorenko (URS)	DQ / 8:29	Michal Vejsada (TCH)	4	8
8	4	Radwan Karout (SYR)	DQ / 7:06	István Tóth (HUN)	0	2
5	1	Panaiot Kirov (BUL)	5 - 3	Kazimierz Lipień (POL)	3	6
5	4	Stelios Mygiakis (GRE)	D2 / 8:05	Lars Malmkvist (SWE)	4	9
4		Ivan Frgić (YUG)		Bye		

=== Round 4 ===
TPP	MPP		Score		MPP	TPP
4	0	Ivan Frgić (YUG)	DQ / 7:15	Panaiot Kirov (BUL)	4	9
4	4	Boris Kramorenko (URS)	DQ / 7:27	István Tóth (HUN)	0	2
5		Stelios Mygiakis (GRE)		Bye		

=== Round 5 ===
TPP	MPP		Score		MPP	TPP
6	1	Stelios Mygiakis (GRE)	6 - 3	Boris Kramorenko (URS)	3	7
7	3	Ivan Frgić (YUG)	4 - 8	István Tóth (HUN)	1	3

=== Final ===
TPP	MPP		Score		MPP	TPP
	4	Boris Kramorenko (URS)	DQ / 7:27	István Tóth (HUN)	0	
	1	Stelios Mygiakis (GRE)	6 - 3	Boris Kramorenko (URS)	3	7
1	0	Stelios Mygiakis (GRE)	DQ / 8:27	István Tóth (HUN)	4	4

== Final standings ==
1. Stelios Mygiakis (GRE)
2. István Tóth (HUN)
3. Boris Kramorenko (URS)
4. Ivan Frgić (YUG)
5. Panaiot Kirov (BUL)
6. Kazimierz Lipień (POL)
7. Radwan Karout (SYR)
8. Michal Vejsada (TCH)
