= Hjelt =

Hjelt is a surname. Notable people with the surname include:

- August Hjelt (1862–1919), Finnish politician
- Edvard Hjelt (1855–1921), Finnish chemist and politician
- Henrik Hjelt (born 1968), Swedish comedian and actor
- Pekka Hjelt (born 1949), Finnish wrestler
- Vera Hjelt (1857—1947), Finnish politician
