= Wrestling at the 1976 Summer Olympics – Men's Greco-Roman 62 kg =

Men's Greco-Roman 62 kg at the Games of the XXI Olympiad
- Venue: Maurice Richard Arena
- Dates: 20–24 July 1976
- Competitors: 17 from 17 nations

Medalists
1st place, gold medalist(s)		Kazimierz Lipień	Poland
2nd place, silver medalist(s)		Nelson Davidyan	Soviet Union
3rd place, bronze medalist(s)		László Réczi	Hungary

The Men's Greco-Roman 62 kg at the 1976 Summer Olympics as part of the wrestling program were held at the Maurice Richard Arena.

== Medalists ==
Gold	Kazimierz Lipień; Poland
Silver	Nelson Davidyan; Soviet Union
Bronze	László Réczi; Hungary

== Tournament results ==
The competition used a form of negative points tournament, with negative points given for any result short of a fall. Accumulation of 6 negative points eliminated the loser wrestler. When only three wrestlers remain, a special final round is used to determine the order of the medals.

Legend

- TF — Won by Fall
- IN — Won by Opponent Injury
- DQ — Won by Passivity
- D1 — Won by Passivity, the winner is passive too
- D2 — Both wrestlers lost by Passivity
- FF — Won by Forfeit
- DNA — Did not appear
- TPP — Total penalty points
- MPP — Match penalty points

Penalties

- 0 — Won by Fall, Technical Superiority, Passivity, Injury and Forfeit
- 0.5 — Won by Points, 8-11 points difference
- 1 — Won by Points, 1-7 points difference
- 2 — Won by Passivity, the winner is passive too
- 3 — Lost by Points, 1-7 points difference
- 3.5 — Lost by Points, 8-11 points difference
- 4 — Lost by Fall, Technical Superiority, Passivity, Injury and Forfeit

=== Round 1 ===
TPP	MPP		Score		MPP	TPP
0	0	Pekka Hjelt (FIN)	TF / 4:55	Gary Alexander (USA)	4	4
0	0	László Réczi (HUN)	TF / 5:46	Gholam Reza Ghassab (IRI)	4	4
4	4	Domenico Giuffrida (ITA)	5 - 19	Teruhiko Miyahara (JPN)	0	0
4	4	Howard Stupp (CAN)	0 - 37	Kazimierz Lipień (POL)	0	0
4	4	Joaquim Jesus Vieira (POR)	TF / 4:40	Stoyan Lazarov (BUL)	0	0
3.5	3.5	Mehmet Uysal (TUR)	3 - 14	Stelios Mygiakis (GRE)	0.5	0.5
0	0	Nelson Davidyan (URS)	TF / 8:49	Lionel Lacaze (FRA)	4	4
4	4	Lars Malmkvist (SWE)	TF / 5:40	Ion Păun (ROU)	0	0
0		Choi Gyeong-su (KOR)		Bye		

=== Round 2 ===
TPP	MPP		Score		MPP	TPP
4	4	Choi Kyung-Soo (KOR)	TF / 1:58	Pekka Hjelt (FIN)	0	0
8	4	Gary Alexander (USA)	DQ / 5:48	László Réczi (HUN)	0	0
4	0	Gholamreza Ghassab (IRI)	27 - 14	Domenico Giuffrida (ITA)	4	8
0	0	Teruhiko Miyahara (JPN)	30 - 4	Howard Stupp (CAN)	4	8
0	0	Kazimierz Lipień (POL)	TF / 1:59	Joaquim Jesus Vieira (POR)	4	8
3	3	Stoyan Lazarov (BUL)	5 - 10	Mehmet Uysal (TUR)	1	4.5
4.5	4	Stelios Mygiakis (GRE)	2 - 15	Nelson Davidyan (URS)	0	0
7.5	3.5	Lionel Lacaze (FRA)	2 - 13	Lars Malmkvist (SWE)	0.5	4.5
0		Ion Păun (ROU)		Bye		

=== Round 3 ===
TPP	MPP		Score		MPP	TPP
0	0	Ion Păun (ROU)	TF / 5:53	Choi Kyung-Soo (KOR)	4	8
4	4	Pekka Hjelt (FIN)	DQ / 8:50	László Réczi (HUN)	0	0
8	4	Gholamreza Ghassab (IRI)	TF / 4:15	Teruhiko Miyahara (JPN)	0	0
0	0	Kazimierz Lipień (POL)	16 - 0	Stoyan Lazarov (BUL)	4	7
8.5	4	Mehmet Uysal (TUR)	TF / 2:36	Nelson Davidyan (URS)	0	0
4.5	0	Stelios Mygiakis (GRE)	DQ / 5:08	Lars Malmkvist (SWE)	4	8.5

=== Round 4 ===
TPP	MPP		Score		MPP	TPP
1	1	Ion Păun (ROU)	11 - 4	Pekka Hjelt (FIN)	3	7
1	1	László Réczi (HUN)	8 - 6	Teruhiko Miyahara (JPN)	3	3
0	0	Kazimierz Lipień (POL)	DQ / 8:55	Stelios Mygiakis (GRE)	4	8.5
0		Nelson Davidyan (URS)		Bye		

=== Round 5 ===
TPP	MPP		Score		MPP	TPP
3	3	Nelson Davidyan (URS)	2 - 4	László Réczi (HUN)	1	2
4	3	Ion Păun (ROU)	2 - 6	Teruhiko Miyahara (JPN)	1	4
0		Kazimierz Lipień (POL)		Bye		

=== Round 6 ===
TPP	MPP		Score		MPP	TPP
3	3	Kazimierz Lipień (POL)	6 - 10	Nelson Davidyan (URS)	1	4
8	4	Ion Păun (ROU)	IN / 1:25	László Réczi (HUN)	0	2
0		Teruhiko Miyahara (JPN)		Bye		

=== Round 7 ===
TPP	MPP		Score		MPP	TPP
8	4	Teruhiko Miyahara (JPN)	4 - 20	Nelson Davidyan (URS)	0	4
3.5	0.5	Kazimierz Lipień (POL)	13 - 4	László Réczi (HUN)	3.5	5.5

=== Final ===
Results from the preliminary round are carried forward into the final (shown in yellow).

TPP	MPP		Score		MPP	TPP
	3	Nelson Davidyan (URS)	2 - 4	László Réczi (HUN)	1	
	3	Kazimierz Lipień (POL)	6 - 10	Nelson Davidyan (URS)	1	4
3.5	0.5	Kazimierz Lipień (POL)	13 - 4	László Réczi (HUN)	3.5	4.5

== Final standings ==
1. Kazimierz Lipień (POL)
2. Nelson Davidyan (URS)
3. László Réczi (HUN)
4. Teruhiko Miyahara (JPN)
5. Ion Păun (ROU)
6. Pekka Hjelt (FIN)
7. Stelios Mygiakis (GRE)
8. Stoyan Lazarov (BUL)
