= Valery Anisimov =

Soviet Greco-Roman wrestler

Personal information
- Born: 7 July 1937 (age 89) Almaty, Kazakhstan

Sport
- Sport: Greco-Roman wrestling
- Club: CSKA Moscow
- Coached by: Aleksandr Mazur
Medal record
Representing the Soviet Union
World Championships
Gold medal – first place	1965 Tampere	-97 kg
Silver medal – second place	1966 Toledo	-97 kg

Valery Vladimirovich Anisimov (Russian: Валерий Владимирович Анисимов, born 7 July 1937) is a Soviet retired heavyweight Greco-Roman wrestler. He won the Soviet title in 1963–1964 and a world title in 1965, placing second in 1966.
