= Georgy Vershinin =

Russian Greco-Roman wrestler

Personal information
- Born: 16 November 1939 (age 86) Myski, Russia

Sport
- Sport: Greco-Roman wrestling
- Club: CSKA Moscow
- Coached by: Aleksandr Mazur
Medal record
Representing the Soviet Union
European championships
Bronze medal – third place	1967 Minsk	-78 kg

Georgy Aleksandrovich Vershinin (Russian: Георгий Александрович Вершинин, born 16 November 1939) is a retired Russian Greco-Roman wrestler who won a bronze medal at the 1967 European Championships.

Vershinin first trained in gymnastics, and took up wrestling inspired by Ivan Poddubny. In 1957 he moved from Myski to Saint Petersburg to study at an institute of physical education, and later served with the Soviet Army in Leningrad Oblast. He retired from competitions in 1969, having won the Soviet wrestling title twice and five times placing second or third. After that for 22 years he coached wrestlers at his sports society CSKA Moscow, raising 10 world champions and one Olympic gold medalist, Gennady Korban.
