= Michal Vejsada =

Czech wrestler

Personal information
- Nationality: Czech
- Born: 26 March 1960 (age 66) Prague, Czechoslovakia

Sport
- Sport: Wrestling

Michal Vejsada (born 26 March 1960) is a Czech wrestler. He competed in the men's Greco-Roman 62 kg at the 1980 Summer Olympics.
