= Gholamreza Ghassab =

Iranian wrestler

Gholam Reza Ghassab
Personal information
- Nationality: Iranian
- Born: 21 March 1956 (age 70) Dezful, Iran

Sport
- Sport: Wrestling

Gholamreza Ghassab (Persian: غلام‌رضا قصاب; born 21 March 1956) is an Iranian wrestler. He competed in the men's Greco-Roman 62 kg at the 1976 Summer Olympics.
