= Mehmet Uysal =

Turkish wrestler

Personal information
- Nationality: Turkish
- Born: 24 May 1954 (age 72)

Sport
- Sport: Wrestling

Mehmet Uysal (born 24 May 1954) is a Turkish wrestler. He competed in the men's Greco-Roman 62 kg at the 1976 Summer Olympics.
