= Anatoly Kirov =

Russian wrestler

Personal information
- Born: 7 July 1936 (age 90) Vologda, Russia

Sport
- Sport: Greco-Roman wrestling
- Club: CSKA Moscow
- Coached by: Aleksandr Mazur

Anatoly Nikolayevich Kirov (Russian: Анатолий Николаевич Киров; born 7 July 1936) is a retired Soviet heavyweight Greco-Roman wrestler. He won the Soviet title in 1956, 1958 and 1961 and a European title in 1962.
