= Nelson Davidyan =

Soviet-Armenian Olympic wrestler (1950–2016)

Personal information
- Born: 6 April 1950 Gyuneychartar, Nagorno-Karabakh
- Died: 11 September 2016 (aged 66) Kyiv, Ukraine
- Height: 1.60 m (5 ft 3 in)
- Weight: 62 kg (137 lb)

Sport
- Sport: Wrestling
- Event: Greco-Roman
- Club: Dynamo Kyiv
- Coached by: I. Kondratzky
Medal record
Men's Greco-Roman wrestling
Representing the Soviet Union
Olympic Games
Silver medal – second place	1976 Montreal	62 kg
World Championships
Gold medal – first place	1974 Katowice	68 kg
Gold medal – first place	1975 Minsk	62 kg
European Championships
Gold medal – first place	1973 Helsinki	62 kg
Silver medal – second place	1977 Bursa	62 kg
Gold medal – first place	1980 Prievidza	62 kg

Nelson Davidyan (Armenian: Նելսոն Դավթյան, 6 April 1950 – 11 September 2016) was a Soviet Armenian Greco-Roman wrestler and coach. He was an Olympic silver medalist and two-time World and European Champion.

== Biography ==
Davidyan was born in the village of Chartar within the Martuni Region of Nagorno-Karabakh to an Armenian family. His family moved to Grozny in 1958 and later to Kiev. Davidyan began wrestling in the Greco-Roman style in 1964 and made the Soviet national team in 1969. He made his international début at the 1970 European Wrestling Championships, where he was sixth in the bantamweight division.

Moving up to featherweight, Davidyan won the 1973 European Championship and then, moving up again to lightweight, won the 1974 World Wrestling Championships as a last minute replacement for Shamil Khisamutdinov. After the 1974 World Championships, Davidyan switched back to featherweight and competed in this class until the end of his career in 1981. After moving back to featherweight, Davidyan won the 1975 World Wrestling Championships as well as the 1975 and 1976 Soviet titles. Davidyan won a silver medal at the 1976 Summer Olympics in Montreal.

He later won silver at the 1977 European Championships, the 1979 Soviet Championships, and the 1980 European Championships. Despite being the European Champion, he wasn't given any reason for not being selected to compete at the 1980 Summer Olympics in Moscow, and retired from wrestling in 1981. After finishing his sporting career, Davidyan worked as a wrestling coach. He was head coach of the Ukrainian national Greco-Roman wrestling team in the 1990s and also held that post again from 2006 to 2009.
