= Stoyan Lazarov =

Bulgarian wrestler

Personal information
- Nationality: Bulgarian
- Born: 28 May 1951 (age 75) Štip, Yugoslavia

Sport
- Sport: Wrestling

Stoyan Lazarov (born 28 May 1951) is a Bulgarian wrestler. He competed in the men's Greco-Roman 62 kg at the 1976 Summer Olympics.
