= Panayot Kirov =

Bulgarian wrestler

Personal information
- Nationality: Bulgarian
- Born: 1 February 1958 (age 68) Yambol, Bulgaria

Sport
- Sport: Wrestling

Panayot Kirov (born 1 February 1958) is a Bulgarian wrestler. He competed in the men's Greco-Roman 62 kg at the 1980 Summer Olympics.
