= Teruhiko Miyahara =

Japanese wrestler (born 1951)

Personal information
- Nationality: Japanese
- Born: 23 July 1951 (age 75)

Sport
- Sport: Wrestling

Teruhiko Miyahara (宮原 照彦, Miyahara Teruhiko; born 23 July 1951) is a Japanese wrestler. He competed in the men's Greco-Roman 62 kg at the 1976 Summer Olympics.
