= Choi Kyung-soo =

South Korean wrestler (born 1945)

Personal information
- Nationality: South Korean
- Born: 15 October 1945 (age 80)

Sport
- Sport: Wrestling

Choi Kyung-soo (born 15 October 1945) is a South Korean wrestler. He competed in the men's Greco-Roman 62 kg at the 1976 Summer Olympics.
