= Vladimir Novokhatko =

Soviet Greco-Roman wrestler

Personal information
- Born: 18 March 1941 (age 85)

Sport
- Sport: Greco-Roman wrestling
- Club: CSKA Moscow
- Coached by: Aleksandr Mazur
Medal record
Representing the Soviet Union
European championships
Gold medal – first place	1968 Västerås	-70 kg

Vladimir Novokhatko (Russian: Владимир Новохатько; born 18 March 1941) is a retired Soviet Greco-Roman wrestler who won a European title in 1968. He took up wrestling in 1956 and after retiring from competitions worked as a wrestling coach.
