= Joaquim Jesus Vieira =

Portuguese wrestler

Personal information
- Nationality: Portuguese
- Born: 17 March 1946
- Died: 6 August 2022 (aged 76)

Sport
- Sport: Wrestling

Joaquim Jesus Vieira (17 March 1946 – 6 August 2022) was a Portuguese wrestler. He competed in the men's Greco-Roman 62 kg at the 1976 Summer Olympics.
