= Domenico Giuffrida =

Italian wrestler

Personal information
- Nationality: Italian
- Born: 3 March 1954 (age 72) Catania, Italy

Sport
- Sport: Wrestling

Domenico Giuffrida (born 3 March 1954) is an Italian wrestler. He competed in the men's Greco-Roman 62 kg at the 1976 Summer Olympics.
