= 1911 World Wrestling Championships =

- Host city: Helsinki, Finland; Stuttgart, Germany; Berlin, Germany; Dresden, Germany; Vienna, Austria
- Dates: 25–28 March 1911; 29–30 April 1911; 13–14 May 1911; 24–27 June 1911; 29 June – 2 July 1911

The following is the result of the unofficial World Greco-Roman Wrestling Championship tournaments in 1911.

== Medal table ==
Rank	Nation	Gold	Silver	Bronze	Total
1	Germany	9	11	8	28
2	Finland	6	3	5	14
3	Austria	2	3	4	9
4	Denmark	2	1	1	4
5	Sweden	1	2	1	4
6	Hungary	1	0	0	1
7	Netherlands	0	1	2	3
Totals (7 entries)		21	21	21	63

== Tournament 1 ==
The first tournament was held in Helsinki, Grand Duchy of Finland from 25 to 28 March 1911.

Event	Gold	Silver	Bronze
Featherweight; 60 kg	Antti Hyvönen; Finland	Herman Parikka; Finland	Vilhelm Lehmusvirta; Finland
Lightweight; 67 kg	Nestori Tuominen; Finland	Gustaf Malmström; Sweden	Paul Tirkkonen; Finland
Middleweight; 73 kg	Emil Väre; Finland	Theodor Tirkkonen; Finland	Alfred Salonen; Finland
Light heavyweight 83 kg	Alfred Asikainen; Finland	Anders Ahlgren; Sweden	Arvo Lumme; Finland
Heavyweight +83 kg	Yrjö Saarela; Finland	Adolf Lindfors; Finland	Alex Järvinen; Finland

== Tournament 2 ==
The second tournament was held in Stuttgart, German Empire from 29 to 30 April 1911.

Event	Gold	Silver	Bronze
Lightweight; 60 kg	Hans Lachnit; Germany	H. Kohler; Germany	Richard Kissling; Germany
Middleweight; 70 kg	Jakob Hörger; Germany	H. Kettner; Germany	Franz Reitmeier; Germany
Light heavyweight 85 kg	Wilhelm Wied; Germany	Heinrich Bohlen; Germany	Karl Groß; Germany
Heavyweight +85 kg	Jakob Neser; Germany	Jean Hauptmanns; Germany	A. Laichinger; Germany

== Tournament 3 ==
The third tournament was held in Berlin, German Empire from 13 to 14 May 1911.

Event	Gold	Silver	Bronze
Lightweight; 60 kg	Erich Kockel; Germany	Max Hippe; Germany	Hille; Germany
Middleweight; 70 kg	Axel Frank; Sweden	Hermann Schulz; Germany	Zeidlitz; Germany
Light heavyweight 85 kg	Karl Paulini; Germany	Harald Christensen; Denmark	Wirrer; Germany
Heavyweight +85 kg	Alex Järvinen; Finland	A. Lehmann; Germany	Anders Ahlgren; Sweden

== Tournament 4 ==
The fourth tournament was held in Dresden, German Empire from 24 to 27 June 1911.

Event	Gold	Silver	Bronze
Featherweight; 60 kg	R. Walter; Germany	Georg Andersen; Germany	Hugo Haese; Germany
Lightweight; 70 kg	Georg Helgerth; Germany	Karl Günzel; Germany	Frederik Hansen; Denmark
Middleweight; 85 kg	Harald Christensen; Denmark	M. Meyer; Netherlands	J. Reindermann; Netherlands
Heavyweight +85 kg	Hermann Gäßler; Germany	Karl Hertel; Germany	Barend Bonneveld; Netherlands

== Tournament 5 ==
The fifth tournament was held in Vienna, Cisleithania from 29 June to 2 July 1911.

Event	Gold	Silver	Bronze
Featherweight; 60 kg	Heinrich Rauss; Austria	Ferdinand Planegger; Austria	Friedrich Scharrer; Austria
Lightweight; 70 kg	Peter Kokotowitsch; Austria	Andreas Mrosek; Austria	Alfred Prinz; Austria
Middleweight; 85 kg	Harald Christensen; Denmark	Karl Barl; Austria	Johann Trestler; Austria
Heavyweight +85 kg	Tibor Fischer; Hungary	Karl Freund; Germany	Franz Mileder; Austria
