= Adolf Lindfors =

Finnish wrestler (1879–1959)

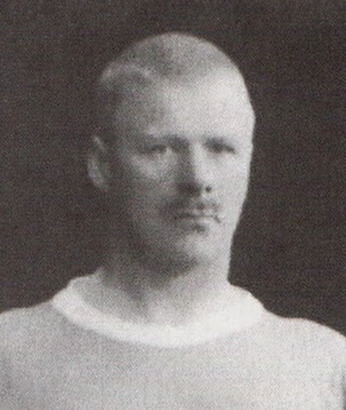

Personal information
- Born: 8 February 1879 Porvoo, Finland
- Died: 5 May 1959 (aged 80) Porvoo, Finland
- Height: 177 cm (5 ft 10 in)
- Weight: 96 kg (212 lb)

Sport
- Sport: Greco-Roman wrestling
- Club: Porvoon Akilles
Medal record
Men's Greco-Roman wrestling
Representing Finland
Olympic Games
Gold medal – first place	1920 Antwerp	Heavyweight
World Championships
Silver medal – second place	1911 Helsinki	+83 kg

Adolf Valentin "Adi" Lindfors (8 February 1879 – 5 May 1959) was a heavyweight Greco-Roman wrestler from Finland. He competed at the 1912, where we became injured and had to withdraw, and 1920 Olympics, where he won a gold medal, aged 41.

Lindfors started seriously training in sports around 1900 and won Finnish titles in weightlifting in 1903–04 and in Greco-Roman wrestling in 1905, 1910, and 1913. He placed second at the 1911 World Championships. In 1902, he founded Porvoon Akilles and headed it from 1902 to 1912.
