= Ghulam Sanay =

Afghan wrestler (born 1957)

Ghulam Sanay (born 5 May 1957) is a former Afghanistan wrestler, who competed at the 1980 Summer Olympics in the Greco-Roman featherweight event.
