= Viktor Igumenov =

Russian wrestler (born 1943)

Personal information
- Full name: Viktor Mikhailovich Igumenov
- Nationality: Russian
- Born: March 10, 1943 (age 83) Omsk, Russian Soviet Federative Socialist Republic, Soviet Union
- Years active: 1961–1972
- Height: 178 cm (5 ft 10 in)
- Weight: 74 kg (163 lb)

Sport
- Country: Soviet Union
- Sport: Wrestling
- Event: Greco-Roman
Medal record
Representing Soviet Union
Men's Greco-Roman wrestling
World Championships
Gold medal – first place	1966 Toledo	78 kg
Gold medal – first place	1967 Bucharest	78 kg
Gold medal – first place	1969 Mar del Plata	74 kg
Gold medal – first place	1970 Edmonton	74 kg
Gold medal – first place	1971 Sofia	74 kg
European Championships
Gold medal – first place	1970 Berlin	74 kg

Viktor Mikhailovich Igumenov (Russian: Виктор Михайлович Игуменов, born 10 March 1943) is a Russian former wrestler who competed in the 1968 Summer Olympics and in the 1972 Summer Olympics and won five world titles.
