= Anders Ahlgren =

Swedish Greco-Roman wrestler (1888–1976)

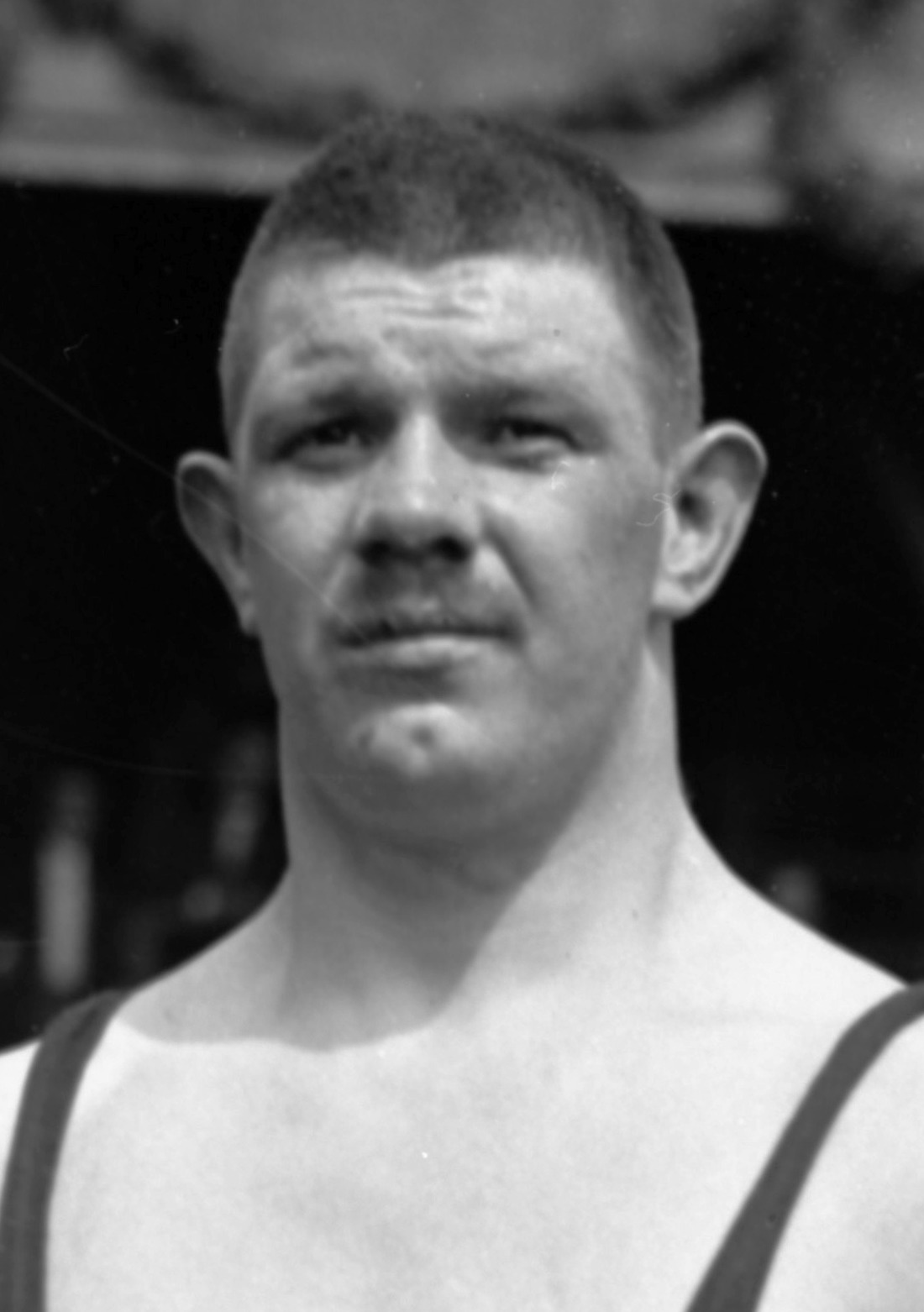
- Ahlgren at the 1912 Summer Olympics

Personal information
- Born: 12 February 1888 Malmö, Sweden
- Died: 27 December 1976 (aged 88) Malmö, Sweden
- Height: 191 cm (6 ft 3 in)

Sport
- Sport: Greco-Roman wrestling
- Club: GAK Enighet, Malmö
- Coached by: Iivari Tuomisto
Medal record
Men's Greco-Roman Wrestling
Representing Sweden
Olympic Games
Silver medal – second place	1912 Stockholm	Light heavyweight
World Championships
Gold medal – first place	1913 Breslau	+82.5 kg
Silver medal – second place	1911 Helsinki	+83 kg
Silver medal – second place	1922 Stockholm	+82.5 kg

Anders Oscar Ahlgren (12 February 1888 – 27 December 1976) was a Swedish Greco-Roman wrestler. He was a world champion in 1913 and finished second in 1911 and 1922.

At the 1912 Summer Olympics, Ahlgren won the silver medal in the light heavyweight class. In a remarkable final, he wrestled for nine hours against Ivar Böhling, before the bout was declared a draw. The judges refused to award a gold medal, and gave silver medals to both wrestlers.

Ahlgren was coached by Iivari Tuomisto, a Finnish heavyweight wrestler.

Besides wrestling Ahlgren was involved in the production of canned food and co-owned a mink farm.
