= Aleksandr Mazur =

Soviet amateur wrestler (1913–2005)

Personal information
- Born: 30 August 1913 Popovka, Barskiy Raion, Vinnytsia Oblast
- Died: 16 December 2005 (aged 92) Moscow, Russia

Sport
- Sport: Greco-Roman wrestling
- Club: CSKA Moscow
Medal record
Representing the Soviet Union
World Championships
Gold medal – first place	1955 Karlsruhe	+87 kg

Aleksandr Grigoryevich Mazur (Ukrainian: Олекса́ндр Григо́рович Ма́зур; Russian: Алекса́ндр Григо́рьевич Ма́зур, 30 August 1913 – 16 December 2005) was a heavyweight Greco-Roman wrestler from Ukraine who won a world title in 1955, aged 42. He retired the same year and between 1955 and 1990 coached wrestlers at his sports society CSKA Moscow. His trainees included Aleksandr Yurkevich, Anatoly Kolesov, Yury Kozin, Anatoly Kirov, Georgy Vershinin, Vladimir Novokhatko and Valery Anisimov.

Mazur was born into a farmer's family and had two brothers and three sisters. He took up wrestling in 1934, and worked as a professional wrestler in a circus until the 1941 German invasion of Soviet Union, when he enlisted to the Soviet Army and until December 1942 fought as a sapper. After that he studied at the State University of Physical Education and won the Soviet heavyweight wrestling titles in 1944, 1945, 1947 and 1949, placing second in 1946, 1948 and 1950–1953 and third in 1943 and 1954. He later had minor roles in the Soviet films Wrestler and clown (1957) and Far from the war.
