= 1909 World Wrestling Championships =

- Host city: Vienna, Austria
- Dates: 3 October 1909

The 1909 unofficial World Greco-Roman Wrestling Championship were held in Vienna, Cisleithania, Austria-Hungary on 3 October 1909.

== Medal table ==
Rank	Nation	Gold	Silver	Bronze	Total
1	Austria	2	1	1	4
2	Denmark	0	1	0	1
3	Bohemia	0	0	1	1
Totals (3 entries)		2	2	2	6

== Medal summary ==
Event	Gold	Silver	Bronze
Lightweight; 75 kg	Alois Toduschek; Austria	Bob Diry; Austria	Andreas Mrosek; Austria
Heavyweight +75 kg	Anton Schmitz; Austria	Hans Egeberg; Denmark	Josef Bechyně; Bohemia
