= Boris Kramarenko =

Soviet wrestler (born 1955)

Boris Kramorenko
Personal information
- Full name: Boris Grigorýewiç Kramarenko
- Born: 11 January 1955 (age 71) Ashgabat, Turkmen SSR
- Height: 166 cm (5 ft 5 in)
- Weight: 62 kg (137 lb)
Medal record
Men's Greco-Roman wrestling
Representing the Soviet Union
Olympic Games
Bronze medal – third place	1980 Moscow	featherweight

Boris Grigorýewiç Kramarenko (born 1 November 1955 in Ashgabat, Turkmen SSR) is a former Soviet wrestler who competed in the 1980 Summer Olympics.
