= Radwan Karout =

Syrian wrestler (born 1950)

Radwan Karout (born 25 March 1950) is a Syrian former wrestler who competed in the 1980 Summer Olympics.
