= Ernst Nilsson =

Swedish wrestler (1891–1971)

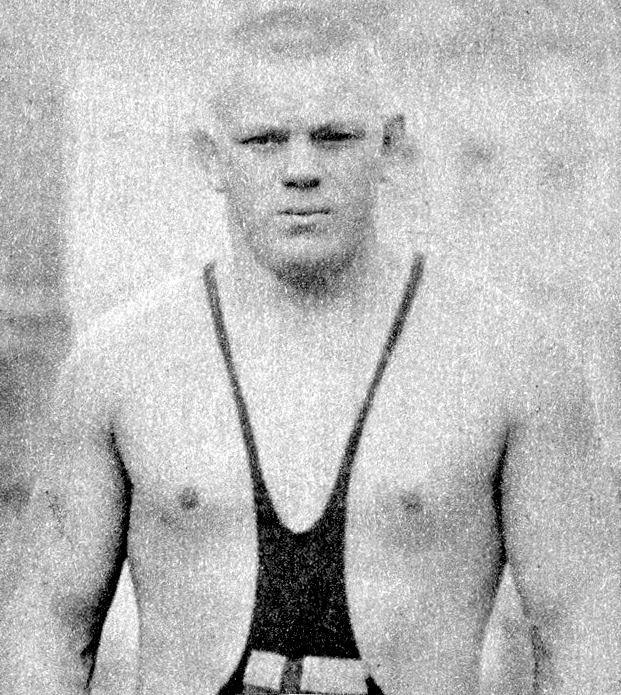

Personal information
- Born: 10 May 1891 Malmö, Sweden
- Died: 11 February 1971 (aged 79) Malmö, Sweden

Sport
- Sport: Wrestling
- Club: IK Sparta, Malmö
Medal record
Representing Sweden
Men's freestyle wrestling
Olympic Games
Bronze medal – third place	1920 Antwerp	+82.5 kg
Men's Greco-Roman wrestling
World Championships
Gold medal – first place	1913 Breslau	82.5 kg
Gold medal – first place	1922 Stockholm	+82.5 kg

Ernst Hilding Waldemar Nilsson (10 May 1891 – 11 February 1971) was a Swedish heavyweight wrestler who competed at the 1912, 1920 and 1924 Summer Olympics. He won a bronze medal in freestyle wrestling in 1920. He placed fourth-fifth in the Greco-Roman and freestyle contests in 1924. Nilsson won two world titles in Greco-Roman wrestling in 1913 and 1922.
