= László Réczi =

Hungarian wrestler (born 1947)

Medal record

Representing Hungary

Men's Greco-Roman wrestling

Olympic Games
Bronze medal – third place	1976 Montreal	Featherweight

László Réczi (born 1947) is a Hungarian wrestler. He was born in Kiskunfélegyháza. He won an Olympic bronze medal in Greco-Roman wrestling in 1976. He won a gold medal at the 1977 World Wrestling Championships.
