= Vera Hjelt =

Finnish politician and social reformer

Intendentti Vera Hjelt
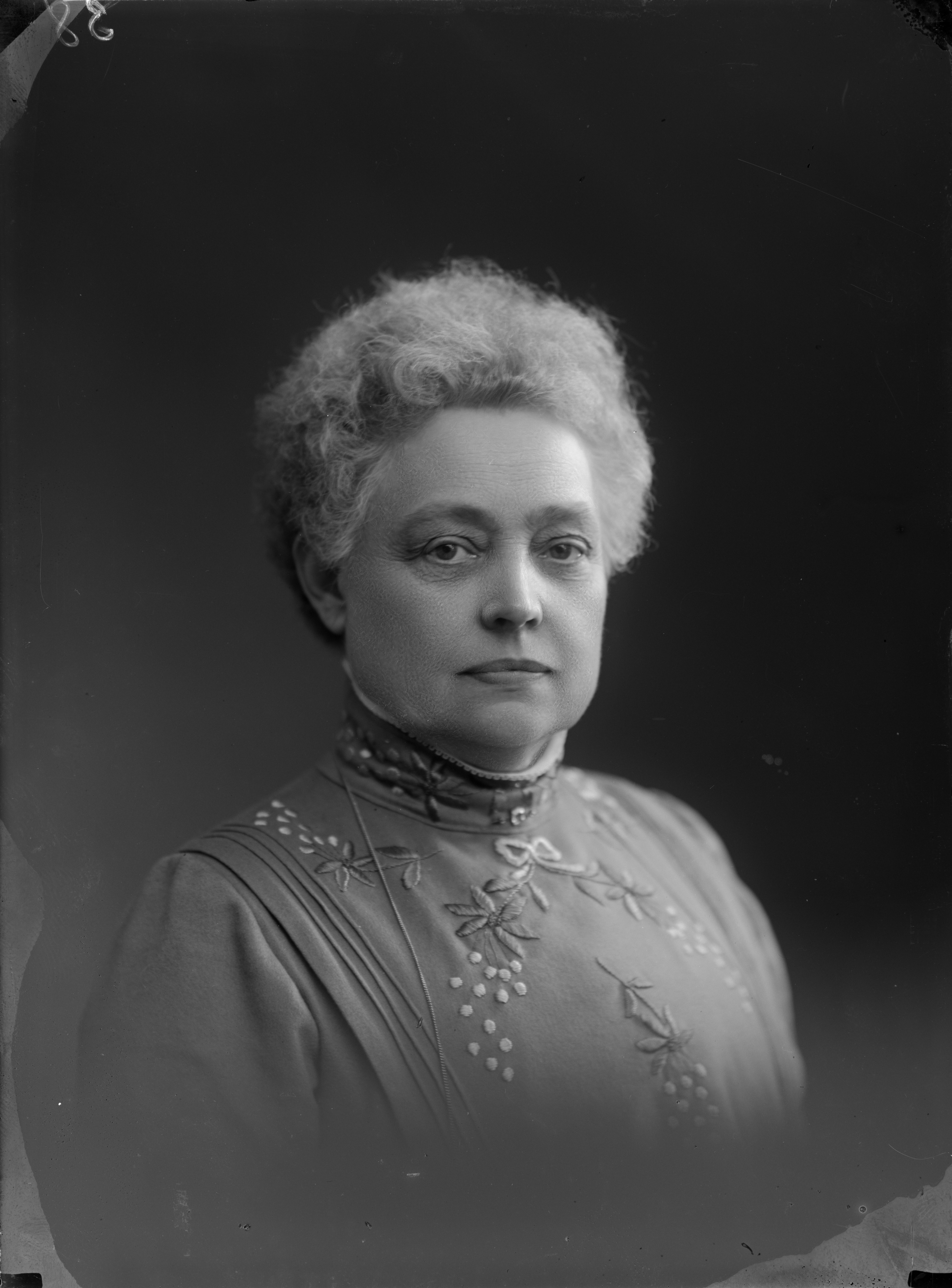

Member of Parliament of Finland
- In office 1 August 1908 – 31 October 1917
- Monarch: Nicholas II
- Governor General: Franz Albert Seyn et al.
- Prime Minister: (Various, see Senate of Finland)
- Parliamentary group: Swedish
- Constituency: Uusimaa

Inspector of occupational safety and health
- In office 1903–1918

Personal details
- Born: Vera Augusta Hjelt; 13 August 1857 Turku, Grand Duchy of Finland
- Died: 23 April 1947 (aged 89) Helsinki, Finland
- Party: Swedish People's Party
- Profession: Teacher
- Known for: Occupational safety and health reform
- Committees: Social and health

Vera Hjelt (1857 – 1947) was a Finnish social reformer, politician and a pioneer of occupational safety and health who strove to improve workplace conditions and treatment of workers.

== Early life and education ==
Vera Hjelt was born to a middle-class family, as the second child of school principal Carl Wilhelm Hjelt and Augusta Charlotta née von Pfaler. She had a relatively lenient upbringing: her father did not consider girls' education to be of much importance, and her mother, who had become disabled when Vera was young, could not contribute much towards her education.

She is known to have been an avid reader, and aspired to become a sculptor.

At age 17, she set up a music store in Turku, the first in the city, which she ran for two years.

In 1881, Hjelt graduated from the Ekenäs seminary, qualifying as a teacher, as well as in the same year completing her art studies at the Turku drawing school (Taideyhdistyksen piirustuskoulu). She went on to continue her training at the Nääs School of Crafts in Sweden, qualifying as an arts and crafts teacher in 1885.

== Career ==
=== Teaching and crafts ===
In the early 1880s, Hjelt taught at primary school in Hammarland and Turku.

After that, she moved to Nääs, where she at the same time both studied and taught crafts, before returning to Finland and taking up the post of principal of a craft school in Helsinki, which role she held 1885–1897, as well as continuing as a primary school teacher.

Alongside her teaching duties, she set up a steam saw and carpentry factory in Oulunkylä (now part of Helsinki), serving as its director for many years.

In 1886, Hjelt was granted a patent for her invention, a portable workbench, which was sold and even exported, including to the USA.

After her retirement from politics (see below), Hjelt returned to teaching, at the Swedish-language technical college in Helsinki, where she worked until 1936.

=== Occupational safety ===
From 1903 until 1918, Hjelt served as an inspector of occupational safety and health (Ammattientarkastaja), and also as a labour statistics researcher from 1906 until 1912. In the former role, she was the first female post-holder, and had to be granted special dispensation for her appointment, as such positions were at that time reserved exclusively for men. She spent much of her time travelling around Finland, visiting factories and workshops, to witness and monitor working conditions first-hand. She is known to have got on well with workers, especially women, and also enjoyed cordial relations with management who were usually happy to implement her pragmatic and carefully-considered recommendations to improve working conditions.

Hjelt was influential in similar inspector positions being established in Norway and Sweden.

In 1909, Hjelt established an exhibition of occupational safety and health, which she managed and curated until 1931; the exhibition later became a permanent public museum (Sosiaalimuseo).

In recognition of her labour reform work, Hjelt was in 1930 granted the honorary title of Intendentti. She was the first person in the country to receive the title.

=== Writing ===
Hjelt wrote for a seasonal (Christmas) publication in 1888–1902, and for a children's magazine in 1905–1906, in both cases for their Finnish and Swedish language versions.

=== Politics and public service ===
In 1908, Vera Hjelt was elected as a Member of Parliament from the Uusimaa constituency, representing the Swedish People's Party.

During her parliamentary career, Hjelt focused mainly on social, labour and women's issues including maternity and unemployment provisions, young workers' and illegitimate children's rights, as well as laws governing women's status in the workplace.

She resigned from her party, and subsequently relinquished her seat in October 1917, on account of having voted, in defiance of her party's policy, for the working time bill providing for a standard eight-hour-working-day.

Outside parliament, she also served in numerous board and supervisory council roles at various public sector and charitable organisations.

== Personal life ==
Vera Hjelt never married; she is known to have confided in her friends that she had many suitors, both "possible and impossible ones", but the only one she was interested in belonged to the latter category.

She had an active social life, and often entertained, including playing the piano and the accordion to her friends, and is known to have composed some of her own music.

In her later life, Hjelt acquired a summer house in Bromarv, on the southwestern coast of Finland.

== Publications ==
- Slöjdläraren för de små (1886)
- Qvinnan på de praktiska arbetsområdena (1888)
- Mellan läxan och leken (1894)
- Siskosarjalle satuja ja kertoelmia (1894)
- Undersökning af nålarbeterskornas yrkesförhållanden i Finland (1908)
- Undersökning af yrkesarbetares lefnadsvillkor i Finland 1908–1909 (1911)
- Tutkimus ammattityöläisten toimeentuloehdoista Suomessa 1908–1909 (1912)
- Medborgarkunskap (1915)
- Socialmuseum (1930)
- Arbetsskydd mot olycksfall och ohälsa (1939)
