= Aleksandr Yurkevich =

Russian Greco-Roman wrestler

- Aleksandr Yurkevich in 1967

Personal information
- Born: 22 May 1942
- Died: 25 June 2011 (aged 69) Moscow, Russia

Sport
- Sport: Greco-Roman wrestling
- Club: CSKA Moscow
- Coached by: Aleksandr Mazur
Medal record
Representing the Soviet Union
World Championships
Gold medal – first place	1969 Mar del Plata	-90 kg
European Championships
Gold medal – first place	1967 Minsk	-87 kg

Aleksandr Mikhailovich Yurkevich (Russian: Александр Михайлович Юркевич; 22 May 1942 – 25 June 2011) was a Greco-Roman wrestler from Russia who won a European title in 1967 and a world title in 1969.
