= 1913 World Wrestling Championships =

- Host city: Breslau, Germany
- Dates: 27–28 July 1913

The 1913 unofficial World Greco-Roman Wrestling Championship were held in Breslau, German Empire in late July 1913.

== Medal table ==
Rank	Nation	Gold	Silver	Bronze	Total
1	Sweden	2	2	0	4
2	Germany	1	1	3	5
3	Russia	1	0	0	1
4	Austria	0	1	0	1
5	Bohemia	0	0	1	1
Totals (5 entries)		4	4	4	12

== Medal summary ==
Event	Gold	Silver	Bronze
Lightweight; 67.5 kg	Ewald Hegewald; Germany	Hugo Johansson; Sweden	Hermann Schulz; Germany
Middleweight; 75 kg	Georg Baumann; Russia	Edvin Fältström; Sweden	Heinrich Stiefel; Germany
Light heavyweight 82.5 kg	Ernst Nilsson; Sweden	Johann Trestler; Austria	František Kopřiva; Bohemia
Heavyweight +82.5 kg	Anders Ahlgren; Sweden	Jakob Neser; Germany	Karl Hertel; Germany
