= István Tóth (wrestler) =

Hungarian wrestler (born 1951)

Medal record

Representing Hungary

Men's Greco-Roman wrestling

Olympic Games
Silver medal – second place	1980 Moscow	Featherweight

István Tóth (born 3 October 1951) is a Hungarian wrestler. He was born in Szolnok. He won an Olympic silver medal in Greco-Roman wrestling in 1980. He won a gold medal at the 1979 and 1981 World Wrestling Championships.
