= Pekka Hjelt =

Finnish wrestler

Personal information
- Nationality: Finnish
- Born: 22 September 1949 (age 76) Helsinki, Finland

Sport
- Sport: Wrestling

Pekka Hjelt (born 22 September 1949) is a Finnish wrestler. He competed in the men's Greco-Roman 62 kg at the 1976 Summer Olympics.
