= Stelios Mygiakis =

Greek Greco-Roman wrestler

Personal information
- Born: 5 May 1952 (age 74) Rethymno, Greece
- Height: 1.67 m (5 ft 5 1/2 in)
- Weight: 62 kg (137 lb)

Sport
- Sport: Wrestling
- Event: Greco-Roman
Medal record
Men's Greco-Roman wrestling
Representing Greece
Olympic Games
Gold medal – first place	1980 Moscow	62 kg
European Championships
Gold medal – first place	1979 Bucharest	62 kg
Mediterranean Games
Gold medal – first place	1983 Casablanca	62 kg
Silver medal – second place	1975 Algiers	62 kg
Silver medal – second place	1979 Split	62 kg

Stelios Mygiakis (Greek: Στυλιανός Μυγιάκης, born 5 May 1952) is a Greek former Greco-Roman wrestler. He won an Olympic gold medal and is the first Greek to become an Olympic Champion in wrestling. Mygiakis also won a gold medal at both the European Wrestling Championships and Mediterranean Games. He was named the 1980 Greek Male Athlete of the Year.

In 1971 Mygiakis became Greek champion, was used in the featherweight division and, for the first time, participated in an international championship, the World Cup in Sofia. There Mygiakis, who was only 19 years old, lost both fights. In the 1972 European Championship in Katowice he had three wins and achieved sixth place. At the Olympic Games in Munich in 1972 he had three wins again, including one over the Soviet favorite, Jemal Megrelischwili, leading to a seventh-place finish.

Over the next six years Mygiakis entered almost every European and World championship but never managed to win a medal. His best results were fourth place at the World Cup 1974 in Katowice, fifth place at the World Cup 1978 in Mexico City and sixth place at the European Championship 1975 in Ludwigshafen am Rhein, each as a featherweight. In all these international championships the top competitors, almost without exception, came from the Eastern Bloc countries.

In 1979, Mygiakis made a breakthrough. At the European Championships in Bucharest, although he lost in the second round against the Soviet wrestler Boris Kramarenko, thanks to three wins over the Turk Metin Eser, the Pole Kazimierz Lipień and Hungarian István Tóth, and fact that Kramarenko lost to Toth, he became the European champions.

The climax of Migiakis's career was the 1980 Olympic Games in Moscow. He beat, among others, Lipień and Tóth again, as well as Kramarenko, and was Olympic champion in spite of a double defeat against Lars Malmkvist from Sweden.

After the Olympics, Migiakis, who had also been the Greek featherweight champion eight times, ended his career as an active wrestler.

== Olympics ==
Mygiakis competed at the 1980 Summer Olympics in Moscow and won a gold medal in Greco-Roman wrestling, the featherweight class.
