= 1907 World Wrestling Championships =

- Host city: Frankfurt, Germany
- Dates: 20 May 1907

The 1907 unofficial World Greco-Roman Wrestling Championship were held in Frankfurt, Germany on 20 May 1907.

== Medal table ==
Rank	Nation	Gold	Silver	Bronze	Total
1	Denmark	2	0	0	2
2	Germany	1	3	3	7
Totals (2 entries)		3	3	3	9

== Medal summary ==
Event	Gold	Silver	Bronze
Lightweight; 75 kg	Christoph Übler; Germany	Uwe Volkert; Germany	Julius Fleischmann; Germany
Middleweight; 85 kg	Harald Christensen; Denmark	Johann Winker; Germany	Hugo Edingshaus; Germany
Heavyweight +85 kg	Hans Egeberg; Denmark	Heinrich Rondi; Germany	Gustav Sperling; Germany

== Participating nations ==
26 competitors from 3 nations participated.

- Denmark (4)
- Germany (19)
- Sweden (3)
