= 1908 World Wrestling Championships =

- Host city: Vienna, Austria
- Dates: 8–9 December 1908

The 1908 World Greco-Roman Wrestling Championship were held in Vienna, Cisleithania, Austria-Hungary on 8 and 9 December 1908.

== Medal table ==
Rank	Nation	Gold	Silver	Bronze	Total
1	Austria	1	2	1	4
2	Denmark	1	0	1	2
Totals (2 entries)		2	2	2	6

== Medal summary ==
Event	Gold	Silver	Bronze
Lightweight; 75 kg	Bob Diry; Austria	Alois Toduschek; Austria	Harald Christensen; Denmark
Heavyweight +75 kg	Hans Egeberg; Denmark	Josef Rossum; Austria	Josef Panzer; Austria
