= 1920 World Wrestling Championships =

- Host city: Vienna, Austria
- Dates: 4–8 September 1920

The 1920 unofficial World Greco-Roman Wrestling Championship were held in Vienna, Austria from 4 to 8 September 1920.

== Medal table ==
Rank	Nation	Gold	Silver	Bronze	Total
1	Austria	2	3	1	6
2	Germany	2	0	3	5
3	Hungary	1	2	1	4
Totals (3 entries)		5	5	5	15

== Medal summary ==
Event	Gold	Silver	Bronze
Featherweight; 60 kg	Franz Reitmeier; Germany	József Pongrácz; Hungary	Gustav Boukal; Austria
Lightweight; 67.5 kg	Ödön Radvány; Hungary	Rezső Péter; Hungary	Miklós Breznotics; Hungary
Middleweight; 75 kg	Viktor Fischer; Austria	Lorenz Koczanderle; Austria	Philipp Heß; Germany
Light heavyweight 82.5 kg	Michael Heinl; Austria	Josef Mach; Austria	Wilhelm Knöpfle; Germany
Heavyweight +82.5 kg	Heinrich Bock; Germany	Franz Wagner; Austria	Adolf Kurz; Germany
