= Hans Egeberg =

Danish wrestler (1877–1921)

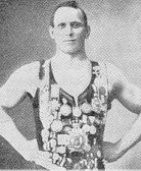

Personal information
- Born: 26 April 1877
- Died: 1921 (aged 46)

Sport
- Sport: Greco-Roman wrestling
- Club: Hermod
Medal record
Representing Denmark
World Championships
Gold medal – first place	1907 Frankfurt	+85 kg
Gold medal – first place	1908 Vienna	+75 kg
Silver medal – second place	1909 Vienna	+75 kg

Hans Heinrich Egeberg (26 April 1877 – 1921) was a Danish heavyweight Greco-Roman wrestler. He won the Scandinavian championships in 1901, a European title in 1902, 1909 and 10, and a world title in 1907 and 1908. In 1908 he also placed second in the Danish boxing championships. After 1910 Egeberg wrestled professionally in a circus.
