= Severin Ahlquist =

Danish wrestler (1877–1946)

Severin Ahlqvist
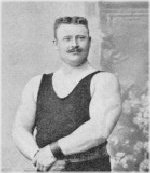

Personal information
- Born: 15 September 1877 Tårnby, Denmark
- Died: 4 April 1946 (aged 68) Copenhagen, Denmark

Sport
- Sport: Greco-Roman wrestling
Medal record
Representing Denmark
World Championships
Gold medal – first place	1904 Vienna	-75 kg

Severin Ahlqvist (15 September 1877 – 4 April 1946) was the first world champion in wrestling from Denmark. He won a gold medal in Greco-Roman wrestling at the 1904 World Championships. Domestically he held the Danish middleweight title in 1901–1902 and 1904.

Ahlqvist was born to Swedish parents. He was an electrician by profession.
