= World Wrestling Championships =

International wrestling event

- Status: Active
- Genre: Wrestling World Championship
- Date: September to October
- Frequency: Annual
- Location: Various
- Years active: Unofficially 1904–1920; Officially 1921–present
- Inaugurated: 1904
- Most recent: 2026 Astana
- Previous event: 2025 Zagreb
- Organiser: United World Wrestling

The World Wrestling Championships for Greco-Roman wrestling (men, since 1904) and freestyle wrestling (men since 1951, women since 1987) are organized by United World Wrestling (UWW).

== Unofficial editions ==
Several World Greco-Roman Championships had been held prior to the creation of the International Amateur Wrestling Federation in 1921, the UWW considers those competitions as unofficial.

Year	Dates	City and host country
1904	23–26 May	Vienna, Austria
1905 (1)	8–10 April	Berlin, Germany
1905 (2)	11–13 June	Duisburg, Germany
1907	20 May	Frankfurt, Germany
1908	8–9 December	Vienna, Austria
1909	3 October	Vienna, Austria
1910 (1)	6 June	Düsseldorf, Germany
1910 (2)	9 October	Vienna, Austria
1911 (1)	25–28 March	Helsinki, Finland
1911 (2)	29–30 April	Stuttgart, Germany
1911 (3)	13–14 May	Berlin, Germany
1911 (4)	24–27 June	Dresden, Germany
1911 (5)	29 June – 2 July	Vienna, Austria
1913	27–28 July	Breslau, Germany
1920	4–8 September	Vienna, Austria

== Editions ==
=== Men's freestyle ===
Year	Dates	City and host country	Team champion
1951	26–29 April	Helsinki, Finland	Turkey
1954	22–25 May	Tokyo, Japan	Turkey
1957	1–2 June	Istanbul, Turkey	Turkey
1959	1–5 October	Tehran, Iran	Soviet Union
1961	2–4 June	Yokohama, Japan	Iran
1962	21–23 June	Toledo, United States	Soviet Union
1963	31 May – 2 June	Sofia, Bulgaria	Soviet Union
1965	1–3 June	Manchester, United Kingdom	Iran
1966	16–18 June	Toledo, United States	Turkey
1967	12–14 November	New Delhi, India	Soviet Union
1969	8–10 March	Mar del Plata, Argentina	Soviet Union
1970	9–11 July	Edmonton, Canada	Soviet Union
1971	27–30 August	Sofia, Bulgaria	Soviet Union
1973	6–9 September	Tehran, Iran	Soviet Union
1974	29 August – 1 September	Istanbul, Turkey	Soviet Union
1975	15–18 September	Minsk, Soviet Union	Soviet Union
1977	21–23 October	Lausanne, Switzerland	Soviet Union
1978	24–27 August	Mexico City, Mexico	Soviet Union
1979	25–28 August	San Diego, United States	Soviet Union
1981	11–14 September	(Socialist Federal Republic of Yugoslavia) Skopje, Yugoslavia	Soviet Union
1982	11–14 August	Edmonton, Canada	Soviet Union
1983	26–29 September	Kyiv, Soviet Union	Soviet Union
1985	10–13 October	Budapest, Hungary	Soviet Union
1986	19–22 October	Budapest, Hungary	Soviet Union
1987	26–29 August	Clermont-Ferrand, France	Soviet Union
1989	31 August – 3 September	Martigny, Switzerland	Soviet Union
1990	6–9 September	Tokyo, Japan	Soviet Union
1991	3–6 October	Varna, Bulgaria	Soviet Union
1993	25–28 August	Toronto, Canada	United States
1994	25–28 August	Istanbul, Turkey	Turkey
1995	10–13 August	Atlanta, United States	United States
1997	28–31 August	Krasnoyarsk, Russia	Russia
1998	8–11 September	Tehran, Iran	Iran
1999	7–10 October	Ankara, Turkey	Russia
2001	22–25 November	Sofia, Bulgaria	Russia
2002	5–7 September	Tehran, Iran	Iran
2003	12–14 September	New York City, United States	Georgia

=== Men's Greco-Roman ===
Year	Dates	City and host country	Team champion
1921	5–8 November	Helsinki, Finland	not awarded
1922	8–11 March	Stockholm, Sweden	not awarded
1950	20–23 March	Stockholm, Sweden	Sweden
1953	17–19 April	Naples, Italy	Soviet Union
1955	21–25 April	Karlsruhe, West Germany	Soviet Union
1958	21–24 July	Budapest, Hungary	Soviet Union
1961	5–7 June	Yokohama, Japan	Soviet Union
1962	25–27 June	Toledo, United States	Soviet Union
1963	1–3 July	Helsingborg, Sweden	Soviet Union
1965	6–8 June	Tampere, Finland	Soviet Union
1966	20–22 June	Toledo, United States	Soviet Union
1967	1–3 September	Bucharest, Romania	Soviet Union
1969	3–5 March	Mar del Plata, Argentina	Soviet Union
1970	4–6 July	Edmonton, Canada	Soviet Union
1971	2–5 September	Sofia, Bulgaria	Bulgaria
1973	11–14 September	Tehran, Iran	Soviet Union
1974	10–13 October	Katowice, Poland	Soviet Union
1975	11–14 September	Minsk, Soviet Union	Soviet Union
1977	14–17 October	Gothenburg, Sweden	Soviet Union
1978	20–23 August	Mexico City, Mexico	Soviet Union
1979	21–24 August	San Diego, United States	Soviet Union
1981	28–30 August	Oslo, Norway	Soviet Union
1982	9–12 September	Katowice, Poland	Soviet Union
1983	22–25 September	Kyiv, Soviet Union	Soviet Union
1985	8–11 August	Kolbotn, Norway	Soviet Union
1986	23–26 October	Budapest, Hungary	Soviet Union
1987	19–22 August	Clermont-Ferrand, France	Soviet Union
1989	24–27 August	Martigny, Switzerland	Soviet Union
1990	19–21 November	Rome, Italy	Soviet Union
1991	27–30 September	Varna, Bulgaria	Soviet Union
1993	16–19 September	Stockholm, Sweden	Russia
1994	8–11 September	Tampere, Finland	Russia
1995	12–15 October	Prague, Czech Republic	Russia
1997	10–13 September	Wrocław, Poland	Russia
1998	27–30 August	Gävle, Sweden	Russia
1999	23–26 September	Piraeus, Greece	Russia
2001	6–9 December	Patras, Greece	Cuba
2002	20–22 September	Moscow, Russia	Russia
2003	2–5 October	Créteil, France	Georgia

=== Women's freestyle ===
Year	Dates	City and host country	Team champion
1987	24–25 October	Lørenskog, Norway	Norway
1989	24–25 August	Martigny, Switzerland	Japan
1990	29 June – 1 July	Luleå, Sweden	Japan
1991	24–25 August	Tokyo, Japan	Japan
1992	4–5 September	Villeurbanne, France	Japan
1993	7–8 August	Stavern, Norway	Japan
1994	6–7 August	Sofia, Bulgaria	Japan
1995	9–10 September	Moscow, Russia	Russia
1996	29–31 August	Sofia, Bulgaria	Japan
1997	10–12 July	Clermont-Ferrand, France	Japan
1998	8–10 October	Poznań, Poland	Russia
1999	10–12 September	Boden, Sweden	United States
2000	1–3 September	Sofia, Bulgaria	Japan
2001	22–25 November	Sofia, Bulgaria	China
2002	2–3 November	Chalcis, Greece	Japan
2003	12–14 September	New York City, United States	Japan

=== Combined ===
Year	Dates	City and host country	Team champion		
Year	Dates	City and host country	Men's freestyle	Men's Greco-Roman	Women's freestyle
2005	26 September – 2 October	Budapest, Hungary	Russia	Hungary	Japan
2006	25 September – 1 October	Guangzhou, China	Russia	Turkey	Japan
2007	17–23 September	Baku, Azerbaijan	Russia	United States	Japan
2008	11–13 October	Tokyo, Japan	not held	not held	Japan
2009	21–27 September	Herning, Denmark	Russia	Turkey	Azerbaijan
2010	6–12 September	Moscow, Russia	Russia	Russia	Japan
2011	12–18 September	Istanbul, Turkey	Russia	Russia	Japan
2012	27–29 September	Strathcona County, Canada	not held	not held	China
2013	16–22 September	Budapest, Hungary	Iran	Russia	Japan
2014	8–14 September	Tashkent, Uzbekistan	Russia	Iran	Japan
2015	7–15 September	Las Vegas, United States	Iran (Note: Russia originally won both men's Greco-Roman and men's freestyle team titles in 2015 but eventually lost them ten years later after a couple of doping disqualifications.)	Azerbaijan	Japan
2016	10–11 December	Budapest, Hungary	not awarded	not awarded	not awarded
2017	21–26 August	Paris, France	United States	Russia	Japan
2018	20–28 October	Budapest, Hungary	Russia	Russia	Japan
2019	14–22 September	Nur-Sultan, Kazakhstan	Russia	Russia	Japan
2021	2–10 October	Oslo, Norway	RWF (Note: At the 2021 World Championships, in accordance with a ban by the World Anti-Doping Agency (WADA) and a decision by the Court of Arbitration for Sport (CAS), wrestlers from Russia were not permitted to use the Russian name, flag, or anthem. They instead participated under the name and the modified flag of the Russian Wrestling Federation (RWF).)	RWF	Japan
2022	10–18 September	Belgrade, Serbia	United States	Turkey	Japan
2023	16–24 September	Belgrade, Serbia	United States	Azerbaijan	Japan
2024	28–31 October	Tirana, Albania	Japan (Note: Georgia originally won the men's freestyle team title in 2024 but lost it in March 2026 after a doping disqualification.)	Azerbaijan	Japan
2025	13–21 September	Zagreb, Croatia	Iran	Iran	Japan
2026	24 October – 1 November	Astana, Kazakhstan	United States	Iran	United States

== All-time medal table ==
Medals won by countries at the World Championships across men's freestyle wrestling, men's Greco-Roman wrestling, and women's freestyle wrestling. Updated after the 2026 World Wrestling Championships.

Rank	Nation	Gold	Silver	Bronze	Total
1	Soviet Union	253	93	69	415
2	Japan	149	81	96	326
3	Russia	114	70	100	284
4	United States	97	108	123	328
5	Iran	83	76	89	248
6	Bulgaria	64	96	105	265
7	Turkey	60	65	86	211
8	Hungary	32	56	52	140
9	Cuba	32	28	51	111
10	China	32	23	46	101
11	Sweden	29	36	50	115
12	France	27	24	25	76
13	Azerbaijan	25	39	45	109
14	Ukraine	21	23	62	106
15	Georgia	17	23	49	89
16	Finland	17	23	21	61
17	Armenia	16	11	27	54
18	Poland	15	39	40	94
19	Romania	15	33	40	88
20	South Korea	14	24	25	63
21	Canada	14	18	33	65
22	Germany	14	17	35	66
23	North Korea	13	7	14	34
24	Norway	12	17	29	58
25	Kazakhstan	8	22	41	71
26	Belarus	8	16	31	55
27	West Germany	8	12	19	39
28	Kyrgyzstan	8	9	19	36
29	Mongolia	7	29	50	86
30	East Germany	7	23	23	53
31	Uzbekistan	7	13	27	47
32	Serbia	7	1	12	20
33	Yugoslavia	5	19	17	41
34	Austria	5	1	3	9
35	Moldova	4	10	7	21
36	Russian Wrestling Federation	4	5	9	18
–	Individual Neutral Athletes (Note: At the 2023 and 2024 World Wrestling Championships, in accordance with sanctions imposed following by the 2022 Russian invasion of Ukraine, wrestlers from Russia and Belarus were not permitted to use the name, flag, or anthem of Russia or Belarus. They instead participated as "Individual Neutral Athletes (AIN)", their medals were not included in the official medal table.)	4	2	6	12
37	Italy	3	8	12	23
38	Czechoslovakia	3	6	11	20
39	Venezuela	3	4	5	12
40	Egypt	3	3	6	12
41	India	2	7	19	28
42	Greece	2	3	12	17
43	Estonia	2	3	5	10
44	Denmark	1	6	8	15
45	Chinese Taipei	1	5	6	12
–	United World Wrestling (Note: Wrestlers from India at the 2023 World Championships and Belarus and Russia at the 2025 World Championships were not permitted to use the name, flag, or anthem of their countries. They instead participated under the name and the flag of the United World Wrestling (UWW), their medals were not included in the official medal table.)	1	4	9	14
46	Ecuador	1	2	1	4
47	Israel	1	1	4	6
48	Bahrain	1	1	3	5
49	Albania	1	1	2	4
50	Belgium	1	0	1	2
51	Slovakia	0	4	6	10
52	Czech Republic	0	2	6	8
53	Puerto Rico	0	2	1	3
54	Nigeria	0	1	5	6
55	Lithuania	0	1	4	5
56	Croatia	0	1	3	4
56	Latvia	0	1	3	4
58	Netherlands	0	1	2	3
59	Lebanon	0	1	1	2
59	North Macedonia	0	1	1	2
59	Tajikistan	0	1	1	2
62	Brazil	0	1	0	1
62	Mexico	0	1	0	1
62	Tunisia	0	1	0	1
62	Turkmenistan	0	1	0	1
66	Spain	0	0	3	3
66	Switzerland	0	0	3	3
68	Colombia	0	0	2	2
68	Pakistan	0	0	2	2
70	Argentina	0	0	1	1
70	Chile	0	0	1	1
70	Great Britain	0	0	1	1
70	San Marino	0	0	1	1
70	Syria	0	0	1	1
Totals (74 entries)		1,273	1,266	1,728	4,267

- Names in italic are national entities that no longer exist.

== Team titles ==
Country	FS	GR	FW	Total
Soviet Union	22	26	0	48
Japan	1	0	28	29
Russia	12	13	2	27
Iran	7	3	0	10
United States	6	1	2	9
Turkey	5	3	0	8
Azerbaijan	0	3	1	4
China	0	0	2	2
Georgia	1	1	0	2
Russian Wrestling Federation	1	1	0	2
Bulgaria	0	1	0	1
Cuba	0	1	0	1
Hungary	0	1	0	1
Sweden	0	1	0	1
Norway	0	0	1	1

== Multiple gold medalists ==
The tables shows those who have won at least 5 gold medals at the World Championships. Boldface denotes active wrestlers and highest medal count among all wrestlers (including these who not included in these tables) per type.

=== Men's freestyle ===
Rank	Wrestler	Country	Weights	From	To	Gold	Silver	Bronze	Total
1	Valentin Yordanov	Bulgaria	52 kg	1983	1995	**7**	2	1	**10**
2	Aleksandr Medved	Soviet Union	+87 kg / 97 kg / +97 kg / +100 kg	1961	1971	**7**	1	1	9
3	**Abdulrashid Sadulaev**	Russia; Russian Wrestling Federation; Individual Neutral Athletes	86 kg / 97 kg / 92 kg	2014	2026	6	1	1	8
4	Sergei Beloglazov	Soviet Union	57 kg / 62 kg	1979	1987	6	1	–	7
4	Arsen Fadzaev	Soviet Union	68 kg / 74 kg	1983	1991	6	1	–	7
6	Jordan Burroughs	United States	74 kg / 79 kg	2011	2022	6	–	3	9
7	Buvaisar Saitiev	Russia	74 kg / 76 kg	1995	2005	6	–	–	6
8	**Kyle Snyder**	United States	97 kg	2015	2026	5	2	2	9
9	Makharbek Khadartsev	Soviet Union; Russia	90 kg	1986	1995	5	2	1	8
10	Khadzhimurat Gatsalov	Russia	96 kg / 120 kg / 125 kg	2005	2014	5	1	1	7
11	Ali Aliev	Soviet Union	52 kg / 57 kg	1959	1967	5	1	–	6
11	**Kyle Dake**	United States	79 kg / 74 kg / 86 kg	2018	2026	5	1	–	6
13	Leri Khabelov	Soviet Union; Russia	100 kg / 130 kg	1985	1995	5	–	1	6
14	Abdollah Movahed	Iran	70 kg / 68 kg	1965	1970	5	–	–	5

=== Men's Greco-Roman ===
Rank	Wrestler	Country	Weights	From	To	Gold	Silver	Bronze	Total
1	Aleksandr Karelin	Soviet Union; Russia	130 kg	1989	1999	**9**	–	–	9
2	Hamid Sourian	Iran	55 kg / 59 kg	2005	2014	6	–	–	6
3	**Rıza Kayaalp**	Turkey	120 kg / 130 kg	2009	2023	5	3	2	**10**
4	Mijaín López	Cuba	120 kg / 130 kg	2005	2015	5	3	–	8
5	**Eldaniz Azizli**	Azerbaijan	55 kg	2018	2026	5	–	3	8
6	Gogi Koguashvili	Russia	90 kg / 97 kg	1993	1999	5	–	1	6
7	Nikolay Balboshin	Soviet Union	100 kg	1973	1979	5	–	–	5
7	Viktor Igumenov	Soviet Union	78 kg / 74 kg	1966	1971	5	–	–	5
7	Valery Rezantsev	Soviet Union	90 kg	1970	1975	5	–	–	5
7	Aleksandar Tomov	Bulgaria	+100 kg	1971	1979	5	–	–	5

=== Women's freestyle ===
Rank	Wrestler	Country	Weights	From	To	Gold	Silver	Bronze	Total
1	Saori Yoshida	Japan	55 kg / 53 kg	2002	2015	**13**	–	–	**13**
2	Kaori Ichō	Japan	63 kg / 58 kg	2002	2015	10	–	–	10
3	Hitomi Obara (Sakamoto)	Japan	51 kg / 48 kg	2000	2011	8	–	–	8
4	Christine Nordhagen	Canada	70 kg / 68 kg / 75 kg	1993	2001	6	1	1	8
5	Yayoi Urano	Japan	75 kg / 70 kg / 65 kg	1990	1996	6	1	–	7
6	**Adeline Gray**	United States	67 kg / 72 kg / 75 kg / 76 kg	2011	2023	6	–	3	9
7	Kyōko Hamaguchi	Japan	75 kg / 72 kg	1997	2010	5	2	3	10
8	Zhong Xiue	China	44 kg / 47 kg / 46 kg	1991	1999	5	2	–	7
9	Shoko Yoshimura	Japan	44 kg	1987	1996	5	1	3	9
10	Liu Dongfeng	China	75 kg	1991	1997	5	–	1	6
10	Stanka Zlateva	Bulgaria	72 kg	2006	2011	5	–	1	6
12	Nikola Hartmann	Austria	61 kg / 62 kg	1993	2000	5	–	–	5
12	**Yui Susaki**	Japan	48 kg / 50 kg	2017	2026	5	–	–	5

== See also ==
- Wrestling World Cup
- U17 World Wrestling Championships
- U23 World Wrestling Championships
- World Wrestling Clubs Cup
- World Beach Wrestling Championships
- List of World Championships medalists in wrestling (freestyle)
- List of World Championships medalists in wrestling (Greco-Roman)
- List of World Championships medalists in wrestling (women)
- List of World and Olympic Champions in men's freestyle wrestling
- List of World and Olympic Champions in Greco-Roman wrestling
- List of World and Olympic Champions in women's freestyle wrestling
