= 1904 World Wrestling Championships =

- Host city: Vienna, Austria
- Dates: 23–26 May 1904

The first unofficial World Greco-Roman Wrestling Championship was organized on May 23, 1904, in Vienna, Cisleithania, Austria-Hungary, just eight years after the first modern Olympics and eight years before the foundation of the International Wrestling Federation of Associated Wrestling Styles. 26 wrestlers from Austria, Denmark, Germany, Bohemia and Hungary participated in the event.

== Medal table ==
| Rank | Nation | Gold | Silver | Bronze | Total |
|---|---|---|---|---|---|
| 1 | Austria | 1 | 1 | 2 | 4 |
| 2 | Denmark | 1 | 0 | 0 | 1 |
| 3 | Germany | 0 | 1 | 0 | 1 |
| Totals (3 entries) | | 2 | 2 | 2 | 6 |

== Medal summary ==
| Event | Gold | Silver | Bronze |
|---|---|---|---|
| Lightweight; 75 kg | Severin Ahlquist; Denmark | Hans Schneider; Germany | Andreas Wolf; Austria |
| Heavyweight +75 kg | Rudolf Arnold; Austria | Anton Schmitz; Austria | Heinrich Wolfram; Austria |

== Participating nations ==
26 competitors from 5 nations participated.

- Austria (19)
- Bohemia (1)
- Denmark (3)
- Germany (2)
- Hungary (1)
