= 1910 World Wrestling Championships =

- Host city: Düsseldorf, Germany; Vienna, Austria
- Dates: 6 June 1910; 9 October 1910

The following is the result of the unofficial World Greco-Roman Wrestling Championship tournaments in 1910.

== Medal table ==
Rank	Nation	Gold	Silver	Bronze	Total
1	Germany	4	4	1	9
2	Austria	1	2	2	5
3	Hungary	1	0	0	1
4	Denmark	0	0	2	2
5	Netherlands	0	0	1	1
Totals (5 entries)		6	6	6	18

== Tournament 1 ==
The first tournament was held in Düsseldorf, German Empire on 6 June 1910.

Event	Gold	Silver	Bronze
Featherweight; 60 kg	Karl Wernicke; Germany	Uwe Fricker; Germany	Jürgen Christian; Germany
Lightweight; 70 kg	Fritz Altroggen; Germany	Hans Bauer; Germany	J. Gelot; Netherlands
Middleweight; 85 kg	Hermann Buchholz; Germany	Fritz Kärcher; Germany	Harald Christensen; Denmark
Heavyweight +85 kg	Gustav Sperling; Germany	Otto Büren; Germany	Søren Marinus Jensen; Denmark

== Tournament 2 ==
The second tournament was held in Vienna, Cisleithania on 9 October 1910.

Event	Gold	Silver	Bronze
Lightweight; 75 kg	Alois Toduschek; Austria	Bob Diry; Austria	Peter Kokotowitsch; Austria
Heavyweight +75 kg	Béla Varga; Hungary	Josef Rossum; Austria	Ludwig Kossuth; Austria
