= 1905 World Wrestling Championships =

Wrestling competition in Berlin

- Host city: Berlin, Germany; Duisburg, Germany
- Dates: 8–10 April 1905; 11–13 June 1905

The following is the result of the unofficial World Greco-Roman Wrestling Championship tournaments in 1905.

== Medal table ==
Rank	Nation	Gold	Silver	Bronze	Total
1	Germany	4	6	6	16
2	Denmark	1	0	0	1
2	Finland	1	0	0	1
Totals (3 entries)		6	6	6	18

== Tournament 1 ==
The first tournament was held in Berlin, German Empire from 8 to 10 April 1905.

Event	Gold	Silver	Bronze
Lightweight; 68 kg	Theodor Schibilski; Germany	Max Beeskow; Germany	Eugen Kissling; Germany
Middleweight; 80 kg	Albert Hein; Germany	Gustav Hede; Germany	Matthias Hartl; Germany
Heavyweight +80 kg	Søren Marinus Jensen; Denmark	Georg Altmann; Germany	Paul Moldt; Germany

== Tournament 2 ==
The second tournament was held in Duisburg, German Empire from 11 to 13 June 1905.

Event	Gold	Silver	Bronze
Lightweight; 75 kg	Theodor Eckert; Germany	Alexander Biehler; Germany	Willy Schäfer; Germany
Middleweight; 85 kg	Willi Dießner; Germany	Philip Schmitz; Germany	Otto Friedrich; Germany
Heavyweight +85 kg	Verner Weckman; Finland	Friedrich Müller; Germany	Gustav Sperling; Germany
