= Jakob Neser =

German wrestler

- Born: 30 December 1883; Ludwigshafen, German Empire
- Died: 25 May 1965 (aged 81); Ludwigshafen, West Germany

Jakob Neser (30 December 1883 – 25 May 1965) was a German wrestler. He competed in the heavyweight event at the 1912 Summer Olympics.
