= Harald Christensen (wrestler) =

Danish wrestler (1884–1959)

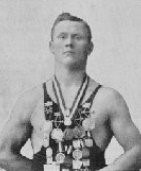

Personal information
- Born: 4 January 1884 Copenhagen, Denmark
- Died: 8 August 1959 (aged 75) United States

Sport
- Sport: Greco-Roman wrestling
- Club: AK DAN, Ballerup
Medal record
Representing Denmark
World Championships
Gold medal – first place	1907 Frankfurt	85 kg
Bronze medal – third place	1908 Vienna	75 kg
Bronze medal – third place	1910 Düsseldorf	85 kg

Jens Harald Christensen (4 January 1884 – 8 August 1959) was a Greco-Roman wrestler from Denmark. He won a world title in 1907, placing third in 1908 and 1910. He also held European titles in 1909 and 1911. He competed at the 1908 and 1912 Summer Olympics, but finished outside the podium.

Domestically, Christensen held the Danish middleweight title in 1907–14. In 190,9 he turned professional, and in 1915, immigrated to the United States where he worked as a wrestling and swimming coach at the University of Iowa. There he was known under the name Harold Mike Howard.
