= Bob Diry =

Austrian boxer

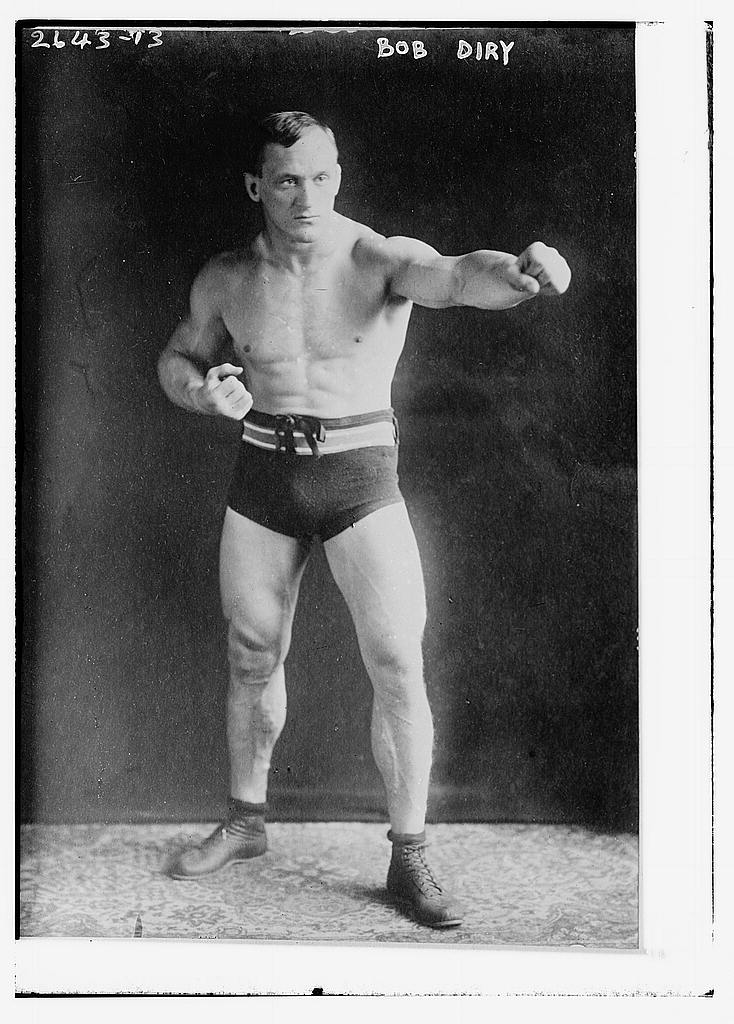

Robert "Bob" Diry (in Austria Robert Dirry, born 12 July 1884 in Vienna, Austria, died 9 February 1935 in New York City) was an Austrian middleweight world champion 1908 in wrestling. In 1910, he trained in Jiu-Jitsu under T.Tobari of the Tenshin-Shin-Yo-ryu and Kodokan Judo at the Vienna Athletics Club which helped him win a lightweight wrestling title. After his migration to America he tried boxing, making him versed in all 3 areas common to modern MMA. He was defeated by George Ashe (boxer) in 1913 in a knockout. Bob would continue wrestling in the US and coached at the New York Athletics club around the years of 1930.
