= 2003 World Wrestling Championships – Men's Greco-Roman 74 kg =

Men's Greco-Roman 74 kg at the 2003 World Championships
- Venue: Palais des Sports Robert Oubron
- Dates: 3–5 October 2003
- Competitors: 40 from 40 nations

Medalists
gold medal	Aleksey Glushkov	Russia
silver medal	Konstantin Schneider	Germany
bronze medal	Kim Jin-soo	South Korea

The men's Greco-Roman 74 kilograms is a competition featured at the 2003 World Wrestling Championships, and was held at the Palais des Sports Robert Oubron in Créteil, France from 3 to 5 October 2003.

== Results ==
Legend

- F — Won by fall

=== Preliminary round ===
==== Pool 1 ====
Pos	Athlete	Pld	W	L	CP	TP	BLR	BUL	ROM
1	Aliaksandr Kikiniou (BLR)	2	2	0	6	5	—	3–0	2–1
2	Tano Prochenski (BUL)	2	1	1	3	7	0–3 PO	—	7–0
3	Cristian Rusu (ROM)	2	0	2	1	1	1–3 PP	0–3 PO	—

Source: Official website

==== Pool 2 ====
Pos	Athlete	Pld	W	L	CP	TP	EST	CHN	IRI
1	Valeri Nikitin (EST)	2	2	0	6	10	—	5–2	5–0
2	Saiyinjiya (CHN)	2	1	1	4	6	1–3 PP	—	4–2
3	Shahram Taherzadeh (IRI)	2	0	2	1	2	0–3 PO	1–3 PP	—

Source: Official website

==== Pool 3 ====
Pos	Athlete	Pld	W	L	CP	TP	FRA	HUN	PER
1	Igor Balaur (FRA)	2	2	0	6	10	—	3–2	7–3
2	Tamás Berzicza (HUN)	2	1	1	5	12	1–3 PP	—	10–0
3	Sixto Barrera (PER)	2	0	2	1	3	1–3 PP	0–4 ST	—

Source: Official website

==== Pool 4 ====
Pos	Athlete	Pld	W	L	CP	TP	KAZ	TUR	COL
1	Danil Khalimov (KAZ)	2	2	0	7	13	—	3–0	10–0
2	Mahmut Altay (TUR)	2	1	1	4	10	0–3 PO	—	10–0
3	José Escobar (COL)	2	0	2	0	0	0–4 ST	0–4 ST	—

Source: Official website

==== Pool 5 ====
Pos	Athlete	Pld	W	L	CP	TP	GEO	GRE	ESP
1	Badri Khasaia (GEO)	2	2	0	6	6	—	3–0	3–1
2	Georgios Tziolas (GRE)	2	1	1	3	3	0–3 PO	—	3–1
3	José Alberto Recuero (ESP)	2	0	2	2	2	1–3 PP	1–3 PP	—

Source: Official website

==== Pool 6 ====
Pos	Athlete	Pld	W	L	CP	TP	UKR	CUB	NOR
1	Volodymyr Shatskykh (UKR)	2	2	0	7	14	—	4–0	10–0
2	Filiberto Azcuy (CUB)	2	1	1	4	10	0–3 PO	—	10–0
3	Mats Rolfsen (NOR)	2	0	2	0	0	0–4 ST	0–4 ST	—

Source: Official website

==== Pool 7 ====
Pos	Athlete	Pld	W	L	CP	TP	RUS	KGZ	UZB
1	Aleksey Glushkov (RUS)	1	1	0	3	8	—	8–3	X
2	Daniar Kobonov (KGZ)	1	0	1	1	3	1–3 PP	—	X
DQ	Aleksandr Dokturishvili (UZB)	0	0	0	0	0	X	X	—

Source: Official website
- Aleksandr Dokturishvili was disqualified after the draw for being found ineligible.

==== Pool 8 ====
Pos	Athlete	Pld	W	L	CP	TP	AZE	ARM	SWE
1	Vugar Aslanov (AZE)	2	2	0	7	2	—	2–1	WO
2	Movses Karapetyan (ARM)	2	1	1	4	3	1–3 PP	—	2–0
3	Mohammad Babulfath (SWE)	2	0	2	0	0	0–4 PA	0–3 PO	—

Source: Official website

==== Pool 9 ====
Pos	Athlete	Pld	W	L	CP	TP	JPN	LTU	POL
1	Katsuhiko Nagata (JPN)	2	2	0	6	9	—	6–0	3–1
2	Artur Stankevič (LTU)	2	1	1	3	2	0–3 PO	—	2–1
3	Michał Jaworski (POL)	2	0	2	2	2	1–3 PP	1–3 PP	—

Source: Official website

==== Pool 10 ====
Pos	Athlete	Pld	W	L	CP	TP	FIN	SUI	IND
1	Marko Yli-Hannuksela (FIN)	2	2	0	7	20	—	8–1	12–0
2	Reto Bucher (SUI)	2	1	1	5	14	1–3 PP	—	13–0
3	Ranbir Singh (IND)	2	0	2	0	0	0–4 ST	0–4 ST	—

Source: Official website

==== Pool 11 ====
Pos	Athlete	Pld	W	L	CP	TP	KOR	SCG	VEN
1	Kim Jin-soo (KOR)	2	2	0	7	13	—	3–1	10–0
2	Dalibor Bušić (SCG)	2	1	1	4	5	1–3 PP	—	4–0
3	Yorly Patiño (VEN)	2	0	2	0	0	0–4 ST	0–3 PO	—

Source: Official website

==== Pool 12 ====
Pos	Athlete	Pld	W	L	CP	TP	GER	USA	DEN
1	Konstantin Schneider (GER)	2	2	0	6	8	—	4–1	4–0
2	T. C. Dantzler (USA)	2	1	1	4	5	1–3 PP	—	4–0
3	Mark Madsen (DEN)	2	0	2	0	0	0–3 PO	0–3 PO	—

Source: Official website

==== Pool 13 ====
Pos	Athlete	Pld	W	L	CP	TP	ISR	CRO	CAN	IRQ
1	Yasha Manasherov (ISR)	3	3	0	10	6	—	3–0	3–0	WO
2	Robert Ribarić (CRO)	3	2	1	6	11	0–3 PO	—	5–0	6–2
3	Andy Mitton (CAN)	3	1	2	4	0	0–3 PO	0–3 PO	—	WO
4	Ahmed Wali (IRQ)	3	0	3	1	2	0–4 PA	1–3 PP	0–4 PA	—

Source: Official website

=== Knockout round ===
Round of 16
Aliaksandr Kikiniou (BLR)	10
Valeri Nikitin (EST)	7
Igor Balaur (FRA)	3
Danil Khalimov (KAZ)	5
Badri Khasaia (GEO)	0
Volodymyr Shatskykh (UKR)	3^{F}
Aleksey Glushkov (RUS)	12
Vugar Aslanov (AZE)	10
Katsuhiko Nagata (JPN)	8
Marko Yli-Hannuksela (FIN)	12

Quarterfinals
Aliaksandr Kikiniou (BLR)	1
Danil Khalimov (KAZ)	3
Volodymyr Shatskykh (UKR)	1
Aleksey Glushkov (RUS)	8
Marko Yli-Hannuksela (FIN)	1
Kim Jin-soo (KOR)	4
Konstantin Schneider (GER)	9
Yasha Manasherov (ISR)	0

Semifinals
Danil Khalimov (KAZ)	0
Aleksey Glushkov (RUS)	3
Kim Jin-soo (KOR)	2
Konstantin Schneider (GER)	7

Final
Aleksey Glushkov (RUS)	3
Konstantin Schneider (GER)	0
Bronze medal match
Danil Khalimov (KAZ)	0
Kim Jin-soo (KOR)	3
