= 2005 World Wrestling Championships – Men's Greco-Roman 74 kg =

Men's Greco-Roman 74 kg at the 2005 World Championships
- Venue: László Papp Budapest Sports Arena
- Dates: 1 October 2005
- Competitors: 33 from 33 nations

Medalists
gold medal	Varteres Samurgashev	Russia
silver medal	Mark Madsen	Denmark
bronze medal	Marko Yli-Hannuksela	Finland
bronze medal	Konstantin Schneider	Germany

The men's Greco-Roman 74 kilograms is a competition featured at the 2005 World Wrestling Championships, and was held at the László Papp Budapest Sports Arena in Budapest, Hungary on 1 October 2005.

== Results ==
Legend

- C — Won by 3 cautions given to the opponent
- D — Disqualified
- F — Won by fall
- WO — Won by walkover

=== Finals ===
Semifinals			Final
Reto Bucher (SUI)	1	0
Mark Madsen (DEN)	5	1^{C}	Mark Madsen (DEN)	0	3	0
Varteres Samurgashev (RUS)	4	5	Varteres Samurgashev (RUS)	7	2	3
Konstantin Schneider (GER)	3	0

=== Top half ===
==== Section 1 ====
Round of 64

Round of 32
Mahmut Altay (TUR)	2	6
José Alberto Recuero (ESP)	0	0
Manuchar Kvirkvelia (GEO)	6	6^{C}
Aliaksandr Kikiniou (BLR)	0	0
Hassan Shahsavan (AUS)	0	2
András Horváth (HUN)	5	3
Cristian Rusu (ROM)	0	2	0
Reto Bucher (SUI)	4	1	1^{C}

Round of 16
Mahmut Altay (TUR)	0	6	5
Manuchar Kvirkvelia (GEO)	6	0	0
András Horváth (HUN)	1	1	1
Reto Bucher (SUI)	4	1	1^{C}

Quarterfinals
Mahmut Altay (TUR)	2	0	2
Reto Bucher (SUI)	1	4	3^{C}

==== Section 2 ====
Round of 64

Round of 32
Ilgar Abdulov (AZE)	2	3
Ahmed Abdelsadek (EGY)	0	2
Yuki Iwasaki (JPN)	1	3	2
Christophe Guénot (FRA)	6	1	2
Roman Melyoshin (KAZ)	0	1
Marko Yli-Hannuksela (FIN)	6	2
Edwin Abreu (DOM)	0	0
Mark Madsen (DEN)	2	9

Round of 16
Ilgar Abdulov (AZE)	1	3	2^{C}
Christophe Guénot (FRA)	1	0	1
Marko Yli-Hannuksela (FIN)	1	0
Mark Madsen (DEN)	1	4^{C}

Quarterfinals
Ilgar Abdulov (AZE)	2	0^{D}
Mark Madsen (DEN)	3	1

=== Bottom half ===
==== Section 3 ====
Round of 64

Round of 32
Varteres Samurgashev (RUS)	4	6
Choi Duk-hoon (KOR)	2	0
Radosław Truszkowski (POL)	1	0
Mehdi Mohammadi (IRI)	3	4
Mohammad Babulfath (SWE)	7	8^{F}
Jitender (IND)	0	0
Andrejs Afanasjevs (LAT)	0	3	3
Georgios Panagiotou (GRE)	3	0	2

Round of 16
Varteres Samurgashev (RUS)	3	4
Mehdi Mohammadi (IRI)	1	0
Mohammad Babulfath (SWE)	4	5
Andrejs Afanasjevs (LAT)	0	1

Quarterfinals
Varteres Samurgashev (RUS)	5	2
Mohammad Babulfath (SWE)	3	0

==== Section 4 ====
Round of 64
Odelis Herrero (CUB)	4	0	3^{F}
Velin Marinov (BUL)	2	6	0

Round of 32
Movses Karapetyan (ARM)	6	5
Valdemaras Venckaitis (LTU)	0	0
Daniar Kobonov (KGZ)	2	1
Konstantin Schneider (GER)	3	2
T. C. Dantzler (USA)	0	0
Aleksandr Dokturishvili (UZB)	2	2
Vasyl Rachyba (UKR)	4	3
Odelis Herrero (CUB)	0	0

Round of 16
Movses Karapetyan (ARM)	0	2
Konstantin Schneider (GER)	3	1^{C}
Aleksandr Dokturishvili (UZB)	4	1^{C}
Vasyl Rachyba (UKR)	0	2

Quarterfinals
Konstantin Schneider (GER)	4	1
Aleksandr Dokturishvili (UZB)	1	1

=== Repechage ===
Repechage round 2
Edwin Abreu (DOM)	0	0
Marko Yli-Hannuksela (FIN)	4	3^{F}
Choi Duk-hoon (KOR)	3	4	1^{C}
Mehdi Mohammadi (IRI)	3	1	1

Repechage round 3
Marko Yli-Hannuksela (FIN)	W	O
Ilgar Abdulov (AZE)
Choi Duk-hoon (KOR)	4	0
Mohammad Babulfath (SWE)	2	4^{F}

Bronze medals
Marko Yli-Hannuksela (FIN)	2	4
Reto Bucher (SUI)	1	0
Mohammad Babulfath (SWE)	2	3
Konstantin Schneider (GER)	4	1^{C}
