= 2006 World Wrestling Championships – Men's Greco-Roman 74 kg =

Men's Greco-Roman 74 kg at the 2006 World Championships
- Venue: Tianhe Gymnasium
- Dates: 26 September 2006
- Competitors: 38 from 38 nations

Medalists
gold medal	Volodymyr Shatskykh	Ukraine
silver medal	Marko Yli-Hannuksela	Finland
bronze medal	Manuchar Kvirkvelia	Georgia
bronze medal	Mark Madsen	Denmark

The men's Greco-Roman 74 kilograms is a competition featured at the 2006 World Wrestling Championships, and was held at the Tianhe Gymnasium in Guangzhou, China on 26 September 2006.

== Results ==
Legend

- R — Retired
- WO — Won by walkover

=== Finals ===
Semifinals				Final
Marko Yli-Hannuksela (FIN)	2	1	2
Manuchar Kvirkvelia (GEO)	1	2	1	Marko Yli-Hannuksela (FIN)	1	0
Konstantin Schneider (GER)	2	0	0	Volodymyr Shatskykh (UKR)	2	4
Volodymyr Shatskykh (UKR)	0	3	3

=== Top half ===
==== Section 1 ====
Round of 64

Round of 32
Ilgar Abdulov (AZE)	1^{R}
Taichi Suga (JPN)	1
Choi Duk-hoon (KOR)	0	2	0
T. C. Dantzler (USA)	4	2	4
Marko Yli-Hannuksela (FIN)	0	3	3
Roman Melyoshin (KAZ)	2	0	0
Odelis Herrero (CUB)	2	2
Valeri Nikitin (EST)	1	1

Round of 16
Taichi Suga (JPN)	0	0
T. C. Dantzler (USA)	4	3
Marko Yli-Hannuksela (FIN)	2	3	2
Odelis Herrero (CUB)	3	3	2

Quarterfinals
T. C. Dantzler (USA)	1	0	2
Marko Yli-Hannuksela (FIN)	1	7	4

==== Section 2 ====
Round of 64

Round of 32
Krzysztof Kowalski (POL)	0	0
Manuchar Kvirkvelia (GEO)	6	6
Hassan Shahsavan (AUS)	0	0
Ahmed Abdelsadek (EGY)	7	8
Julio Cueno (COL)	0	0
Konstantinos Papadopoulos (GRE)	3	6
Michael Baletin (PHI)	0	0
Neven Žugaj (CRO)	6	7

Round of 16
Manuchar Kvirkvelia (GEO)	3	6
Ahmed Abdelsadek (EGY)	1	1
Konstantinos Papadopoulos (GRE)	0	0
Neven Žugaj (CRO)	6	3

Quarterfinals
Manuchar Kvirkvelia (GEO)	2	1	4
Neven Žugaj (CRO)	1	4	0

=== Bottom half ===
==== Section 3 ====
Round of 64

Round of 32
Davoud Abedinzadeh (IRI)	5	2
José Alberto Recuero (ESP)	0	1
Chang Yongxiang (CHN)	1	1	0
Mohammad Babulfath (SWE)	1	3	3
Konstantin Schneider (GER)	3	3
Denis Zdorikov (UZB)	2	0
Aleh Mikhalovich (BLR)	3	1	6
Varteres Samurgashev (RUS)	1	1	0

Round of 16
Davoud Abedinzadeh (IRI)	3	2
Mohammad Babulfath (SWE)	1	0
Konstantin Schneider (GER)	3	2	2
Aleh Mikhalovich (BLR)	2	3	0

Quarterfinals
Davoud Abedinzadeh (IRI)	5	1	0
Konstantin Schneider (GER)	0	2	2

==== Section 4 ====
Round of 64
Volodymyr Shatskykh (UKR)	W	O
Rajbir Singh (IND)
Ilya Shafran (ISR)	3	4
Edwin Abreu (DOM)	0	0
Mahmut Altay (TUR)	1	0
Reto Bucher (SUI)	2	4
Movses Karapetyan (ARM)	1	1
Joakim Aardalen (NOR)	1	2
Valdemaras Venckaitis (LTU)	0	3	0
Mark Madsen (DEN)	3	0	4
Chuang Chun-yueh (TPE)	0	0
Andrejs Afanasjevs (LAT)	6	7

Round of 32
Yavor Yanakiev (BUL)	0	3
Daniar Kobonov (KGZ)	4	5
Volodymyr Shatskykh (UKR)	1	7	7
Ilya Shafran (ISR)	1	0	0
Reto Bucher (SUI)	1	2	4
Joakim Aardalen (NOR)	2	1	2
Mark Madsen (DEN)	4	6
Andrejs Afanasjevs (LAT)	1	0

Round of 16
Daniar Kobonov (KGZ)	2	0
Volodymyr Shatskykh (UKR)	3	7
Reto Bucher (SUI)	2	1	1
Mark Madsen (DEN)	1	5	9

Quarterfinals
Volodymyr Shatskykh (UKR)	2	1	3
Mark Madsen (DEN)	1	1	0

=== Repechage ===
Repechage round 1
Rajbir Singh (IND)
Ilya Shafran (ISR)	W	O

Repechage round 2
Roman Melyoshin (KAZ)	2	0	1
Odelis Herrero (CUB)	1	5	1
Ilya Shafran (ISR)	1	2
Daniar Kobonov (KGZ)	1	3

Repechage round 3
Roman Melyoshin (KAZ)	1	4	2
T. C. Dantzler (USA)	2	0	3
Daniar Kobonov (KGZ)	0	1
Mark Madsen (DEN)	2	2

Bronze medals
T. C. Dantzler (USA)	1	1	0
Manuchar Kvirkvelia (GEO)	1	2	6
Mark Madsen (DEN)	3	6
Konstantin Schneider (GER)	0	0
