= 2002 World Wrestling Championships – Men's Greco-Roman 74 kg =

Men's Greco-Roman 74 kg at the 2002 World Championships
- Venue: Universal Sports Hall CSKA
- Dates: 21–22 September 2002
- Competitors: 34 from 34 nations

Medalists
gold medal	Varteres Samurgashev	Russia
silver medal	Badri Khasaia	Georgia
bronze medal	Filiberto Azcuy	Cuba

The men's Greco-Roman 74 kilograms is a competition featured at the 2002 World Wrestling Championships, and was held at the Universal Sports Hall CSKA in Moscow, Russia from 21 to 22 September 2002.

== Results ==
Legend

- F — Won by fall

=== Preliminary round ===
==== Pool 1 ====
Pos	Athlete	Pld	W	L	CP	TP	FIN	SWE	ESP
1	Marko Yli-Hannuksela (FIN)	2	2	0	6	8	—	5–3	3–0
2	Mohammad Babulfath (SWE)	2	1	1	4	7	1–3 PP	—	4–0
3	José Alberto Recuero (ESP)	2	0	2	0	0	0–3 PO	0–3 PO	—

Source: Official website

==== Pool 2 ====
Pos	Athlete	Pld	W	L	CP	TP	GEO	FRA	KAZ
1	Badri Khasaia (GEO)	2	2	0	6	11	—	6–1	5–0
2	Alain Hassli (FRA)	2	1	1	4	9	1–3 PP	—	8–1
3	Abai Udeshov (KAZ)	2	0	2	1	1	0–3 PO	1–3 PP	—

Source: Official website

==== Pool 3 ====
Pos	Athlete	Pld	W	L	CP	TP	POL	DEN	PER
1	Michał Jaworski (POL)	2	2	0	7	16	—	5–0	11–0
2	Mark Madsen (DEN)	2	1	1	4	12	0–3 PO	—	12–1
3	Sixto Barrera (PER)	2	0	2	1	1	0–4 ST	1–4 SP	—

Source: Official website

==== Pool 4 ====
Pos	Athlete	Pld	W	L	CP	TP	UZB	MAR	KGZ
1	Jahongir Turdiev (UZB)	2	2	0	8	20	—	10–0	10–0
2	Anwar Kandafil (MAR)	2	1	1	3	4	0–4 ST	—	4–2
3	Janbolot Musaev (KGZ)	2	0	2	1	2	0–4 ST	1–3 PP	—

Source: Official website

==== Pool 5 ====
Pos	Athlete	Pld	W	L	CP	TP	USA	GRE	NOR
1	T. C. Dantzler (USA)	2	2	0	8	21	—	10–0 Fall	11–0
2	Georgios Panagiotou (GRE)	2	1	1	3	4	0–4 TO	—	4–0
3	Joacim Iversen (NOR)	2	0	2	0	0	0–4 ST	0–3 PO	—

Source: Official website

==== Pool 6 ====
Pos	Athlete	Pld	W	L	CP	TP	UKR	JPN	SUI
1	Volodymyr Shatskykh (UKR)	2	2	0	6	13	—	5–1	8–0
2	Katsuhiko Nagata (JPN)	2	1	1	4	5	1–3 PP	—	4–0
3	Daniel Schnyder (SUI)	2	0	2	0	0	0–3 PO	0–3 PO	—

Source: Official website

==== Pool 7 ====
Pos	Athlete	Pld	W	L	CP	TP	GER	KOR	CHN
1	Konstantin Schneider (GER)	2	2	0	6	12	—	3–1	9–0
2	Park Jin-sung (KOR)	2	1	1	4	4	1–3 PP	—	3–2
3	Dai Xueming (CHN)	2	0	2	1	2	0–3 PO	1–3 PP	—

Source: Official website

==== Pool 8 ====
Pos	Athlete	Pld	W	L	CP	TP	RUS	TUR	ARM
1	Varteres Samurgashev (RUS)	2	2	0	6	7	—	3–2	4–0
2	Mahmut Altay (TUR)	2	1	1	4	7	1–3 PP	—	5–0
3	Movses Karapetyan (ARM)	2	0	2	0	0	0–3 PO	0–3 PO	—

Source: Official website

==== Pool 9 ====
Pos	Athlete	Pld	W	L	CP	TP	BLR	BUL	TPE
1	Aliaksandr Kikiniou (BLR)	2	2	0	8	17	—	6–2 Fall	11–0
2	Tano Prochenski (BUL)	2	1	1	4	12	0–4 TO	—	10–0
3	Lin Hsiang-ping (TPE)	2	0	2	0	0	0–4 ST	0–4 ST	—

Source: Official website

==== Pool 10 ====
Pos	Athlete	Pld	W	L	CP	TP	HUN	ROM	LTU
1	Tamás Berzicza (HUN)	2	2	0	7	15	—	10–0	5–0
2	Cristian Rusu (ROM)	2	1	1	3	2	0–4 ST	—	2–0
3	Artur Stankevič (LTU)	2	0	2	0	0	0–3 PO	0–3 PO	—

Source: Official website

==== Pool 11 ====
Pos	Athlete	Pld	W	L	CP	TP	CUB	AZE	EST	BIH
1	Filiberto Azcuy (CUB)	3	3	0	9	13	—	4–0	4–0	5–1
2	Vugar Aslanov (AZE)	3	2	1	6	6	0–3 PO	—	3–1	3–0
3	Valeri Nikitin (EST)	3	1	2	4	5	0–3 PO	1–3 PP	—	4–0
4	Dragan Marković (BIH)	3	0	3	1	1	1–3 PP	0–3 PO	0–3 PO	—

Source: Official website

=== Knockout round ===
Round of 16
Marko Yli-Hannuksela (FIN)	2
Badri Khasaia (GEO)	5
Michał Jaworski (POL)	3
Jahongir Turdiev (UZB)	1
T. C. Dantzler (USA)	0
Volodymyr Shatskykh (UKR)	3

Quarterfinals
Badri Khasaia (GEO)	7
Michał Jaworski (POL)	0
Volodymyr Shatskykh (UKR)	7^{F}
Konstantin Schneider (GER)	0
Varteres Samurgashev (RUS)	3
Aliaksandr Kikiniou (BLR)	0
Tamás Berzicza (HUN)	2
Filiberto Azcuy (CUB)	3

Semifinals
Badri Khasaia (GEO)	3
Volodymyr Shatskykh (UKR)	0
Varteres Samurgashev (RUS)	8
Filiberto Azcuy (CUB)	2

Final
Badri Khasaia (GEO)	0
Varteres Samurgashev (RUS)	3
Bronze medal match
Volodymyr Shatskykh (UKR)	1
Filiberto Azcuy (CUB)	5
