= 2010 World Wrestling Championships – Men's Greco-Roman 74 kg =

Men's Greco-Roman 74 kg at the 2010 World Championships
- Venue: Olympic Stadium
- Dates: 8 September 2010
- Competitors: 39 from 39 nations

Medalists
gold medal	Selçuk Çebi	Turkey
silver medal	Arsen Julfalakyan	Armenia
bronze medal	Imil Sharafetdinov	Russia
bronze medal	Daniar Kobonov	Kyrgyzstan

The men's Greco-Roman 74 kilograms is a competition featured at the 2010 World Wrestling Championships, and was held at the Olympic Stadium in Moscow, Russia on 8 September.

== Results ==
Legend

- F — Won by fall

=== Finals ===
Semifinals			Final
Selçuk Çebi (TUR)	8	1
Imil Sharafetdinov (RUS)	0	0	Selçuk Çebi (TUR)	0	1	1
Arsen Julfalakyan (ARM)	4	1	Arsen Julfalakyan (ARM)	1	0	0
Takehiro Kanakubo (JPN)	0	0

=== Top half ===
==== Section 1 ====
Round of 64

Round of 32
Selçuk Çebi (TUR)	2	1
Angelo Mota (DOM)	0	0
Rafig Huseynov (AZE)	1	1
Robert Rosengren (SWE)	0	0
Ilya Shafran (ISR)	0	0
Neven Žugaj (CRO)	1	1
Mailín Consuegra (CUB)	0	0
Manuchar Kvirkvelia (GEO)	1	1

Round of 16
Selçuk Çebi (TUR)	0	1	1
Rafig Huseynov (AZE)	1	0	0
Neven Žugaj (CRO)	1	1	1
Manuchar Kvirkvelia (GEO)	1	0	0

Quarterfinals
Selçuk Çebi (TUR)	0	1	1
Neven Žugaj (CRO)	1	0	0

==== Section 2 ====
Round of 64

Round of 32
Julian Kwit (POL)	0	0
Imil Sharafetdinov (RUS)	1	3
Hassan Shahsavan (AUS)	0	0
Konstantin Schneider (GER)	1	1
Azizbek Murodov (UZB)	4	7
Richard Addinall (RSA)	0	0
Aliaksandr Kikiniou (BLR)	0	2
Dmytro Pyshkov (UKR)	3	9

Round of 16
Imil Sharafetdinov (RUS)	0	1	5
Konstantin Schneider (GER)	1	0	0
Azizbek Murodov (UZB)	0	0
Dmytro Pyshkov (UKR)	1	2

Quarterfinals
Imil Sharafetdinov (RUS)	2	3
Dmytro Pyshkov (UKR)	0	0

=== Bottom half ===
==== Section 3 ====
Round of 64

Round of 32
Daniar Kobonov (KGZ)	4	1
Aziz Boualem (MAR)	0	0
Thomas Suppiger (SUI)	0	0
Wang Bingxuan (CHN)	7	4
Valtteri Moisio (FIN)	0	3	0
Jure Kuhar (SLO)	2	0	1
Arsen Julfalakyan (ARM)	4	6
Francisco Barrio (ARG)	0	0

Round of 16
Daniar Kobonov (KGZ)	3	0	3
Wang Bingxuan (CHN)	0	1	0
Jure Kuhar (SLO)	0	0
Arsen Julfalakyan (ARM)	1	2

Quarterfinals
Daniar Kobonov (KGZ)	2	0
Arsen Julfalakyan (ARM)	2	3

==== Section 4 ====
Round of 64
Takehiro Kanakubo (JPN)	5^{F}
Katea Ueresi (SOL)	0
Mehdi Mohammadi (IRI)	0	1	0
Aleksandr Kazakevič (LTU)	1	0	1
Saverio Scaramuzzi (ITA)	0	0
Tomáš Sobecký (CZE)	3	5
Christophe Guénot (FRA)	0	1	1
Jake Fisher (USA)	1	0	0
Ilian Georgiev (BUL)	0	0
Aleksandrs Višņakovs (LAT)	1	5
Keitani Graham (FSM)	0	0
Park Jin-sung (KOR)	1	6
Roman Melyoshin (KAZ)	2	1	1
Péter Bácsi (HUN)	0	6	0

Round of 32
Petros Manouilidis (GRE)	0	0
Takehiro Kanakubo (JPN)	1	2
Aleksandr Kazakevič (LTU)	1	2
Tomáš Sobecký (CZE)	0	0
Christophe Guénot (FRA)	2	2
Aleksandrs Višņakovs (LAT)	0	0
Park Jin-sung (KOR)	1	0
Roman Melyoshin (KAZ)	0	2^{F}

Round of 16
Takehiro Kanakubo (JPN)	2	2
Aleksandr Kazakevič (LTU)	0	0
Christophe Guénot (FRA)	3	0	0
Roman Melyoshin (KAZ)	0	1	1

Quarterfinals
Takehiro Kanakubo (JPN)	3	0	3
Roman Melyoshin (KAZ)	0	1	0

=== Repechage ===
Repechage round 2
Angelo Mota (DOM)	0	0
Rafig Huseynov (AZE)	1	5
Francisco Barrio (ARG)	0	0
Jure Kuhar (SLO)	3	1

Repechage round 3
Rafig Huseynov (AZE)	3	3
Neven Žugaj (CRO)	0	3
Jure Kuhar (SLO)	0	3	0
Daniar Kobonov (KGZ)	1	0	3

Bronze medals
Rafig Huseynov (AZE)	0	0
Imil Sharafetdinov (RUS)	1	4
Daniar Kobonov (KGZ)	1	2
Takehiro Kanakubo (JPN)	0	0
