= Finland at the 2004 Summer Olympics =

- IOC code: FIN
- NOC: Finnish Olympic Committee
- Website: sport.fi/olympiakomitea (in Finnish and Swedish)

in Athens
- Competitors: 53 in 12 sports
- Flag bearer: Thomas Johanson
- Medals Ranked 62nd: Gold 0 Silver 2 Bronze 0 Total 2

Summer Olympics appearances (overview)
- 1908; 1912; 1920; 1924; 1928; 1932; 1936; 1948; 1952; 1956; 1960; 1964; 1968; 1972; 1976; 1980; 1984; 1988; 1992; 1996; 2000; 2004; 2008; 2012; 2016; 2020; 2024

Other related appearances
- 1906 Intercalated Games

Finland competed at the 2004 Summer Olympics in Athens, Greece, from 13 to 29 August 2004. Finnish athletes have competed at every Olympic Games since its debut in 1908. The Finnish Olympic Committee (Finnish: Suomen Olympiakomitea, SOK) sent the nation's smallest ever team to the Games after the 1932 Summer Olympics in Los Angeles. A total of 53 athletes, 36 men and 17 women, competed only in 12 sports; the nation's team size was roughly denser from Sydney by a quarter of the athletes.

The Finnish team featured three returning Olympic medalists from Sydney: Greco-Roman wrestler Marko Yli-Hannuksela, rifle shooter Juha Hirvi, who won a silver in the men's rifle three positions, and competed at his fifth Olympic Games, and open skiff sailor and defending Olympic champion Thomas Johanson, who was appointed by the committee to carry the Finnish flag in the opening ceremony. Other notable Finnish athletes included swimmers Hanna-Maria Seppälä and 1996 Olympic silver medalist Jani Sievinen, professional tennis player Jarkko Nieminen, javelin thrower and top medal contender Tero Pitkämäki, and hammer thrower Olli-Pekka Karjalainen.

Finland left Athens with their worst athletic performance, as the Finns failed to pick up a single gold for the first time in the entire Olympic history. Two silver medals were awarded to the Finnish team for skeet shooter Marko Kemppainen, and Greco-Roman wrestler Marko Yli-Hannuksela, who had previously won a bronze from Sydney in the men's 74 kg category.

== Medalists ==
Medal	Name	Sport	Event	Date
Silver	Marko Kemppainen	Shooting	Men's skeet	August 22
Silver	Marko Yli-Hannuksela	Wrestling	Men's Greco-Roman 74 kg	August 26

== Archery ==
One Finnish archer qualified for the women's individual archery.

Athlete	Event	Ranking round		Round of 64	Round of 32	Round of 16	Quarterfinals	Semifinals	Final / BM	
Athlete	Event	Score	Seed	Opposition Score	Opposition Score	Opposition Score	Opposition Score	Opposition Score	Opposition Score	Rank
Mari Piuva	Women's individual	615	49	Nasaridze (TUR); W 136–133	Folkard (GBR); L 151–156	Did not advance				

== Athletics ==
Finnish athletes have so far achieved qualifying standards in the following athletics events (up to a maximum of 3 athletes in each event at the 'A' Standard, and 1 at the 'B' Standard).

Key

- Note–Ranks given for track events are within the athlete's heat only
- Q = Qualified for the next round
- q = Qualified for the next round as a fastest loser or, in field events, by position without achieving the qualifying target
- NR = National record
- N/A = Round not applicable for the event
- Bye = Athlete not required to compete in round

Men
Track & road events

Athlete	Event	Final	
Athlete	Event	Result	Rank
Janne Holmén	Marathon	2:17:50	22
Jani Lehtinen	50 km walk	4:05:35	28
Jussi Utriainen	Marathon	DNF	

Field events

Athlete	Event	Qualification		Final	
Athlete	Event	Distance	Position	Distance	Position
Oskari Frösén	High jump	2.20	25	Did not advance	
Olli-Pekka Karjalainen	Hammer throw	76.11	15	Did not advance	
Esko Mikkola	Javelin throw	83.64	4 Q	79.43	11
Matti Mononen	Pole vault	5.65	17	Did not advance	
Matti Närhi	Javelin throw	81.06	10 Q	80.28	10
Tero Pitkämäki	Javelin throw	82.04	7 Q	83.01	8
Vesa Rantanen	Pole vault	5.50	=22	Did not advance	
Tepa Reinikainen	Shot put	19.74	13	Did not advance	
David Söderberg	Hammer throw	74.14	22	Did not advance	
Ville Tiisanoja	Shot put	19.50	19	Did not advance	

Combined events – Decathlon

Athlete	Event	100 m	LJ	SP	HJ	400 m	110H	DT	PV	JT	1500 m	Final	Rank
Jaakko Ojaniemi	Result	10.68	7.50	14.97	1.94	49.12	15.01	40.35	4.60	59.26	4:35.71	8006	16
Jaakko Ojaniemi	Points	933	935	788	749	856	848	672	790	727	708	8006	16

Women
Track & road events

Athlete	Event	Heat		Quarterfinal		Semifinal		Final	
Athlete	Event	Result	Rank	Result	Rank	Result	Rank	Result	Rank
Johanna Manninen	100 m	11.45	5	Did not advance					
Johanna Manninen	200 m	23.45	5	Did not advance					
Kirsi Mykkanen	400 m	52.53	6	—N/a		Did not advance			
Kirsi Valasti	5000 m	15:33.78	10	—N/a				Did not advance	

Field events

Athlete	Event	Qualification		Final	
Athlete	Event	Distance	Position	Distance	Position
Mikaela Ingberg	Javelin throw	60.80	13	Did not advance	
Taina Kolkkala	Javelin throw	61.16	10 Q	60.72	10
Heli Koivula Kruger	Long jump	6.50	16	Did not advance	
Heli Koivula Kruger	Triple jump	13.98	23	Did not advance	
Sini Pöyry	Hammer throw	66.05	23	Did not advance	
Paula Tarvainen	Javelin throw	56.88	28	Did not advance	

Combined events – Heptathlon

Athlete	Event	100H	HJ	SP	200 m	LJ	JT	800 m	Final	Rank
Tiia Hautala	Result	13.99	1.70	11.56	26.10	4.39	DNS	—	DNF	
Tiia Hautala	Points	980	855	632	788	401	0	—	DNF	

== Badminton ==
Athlete	Event	Round of 32	Round of 16	Quarterfinal	Semifinal	Final / BM	
Athlete	Event	Opposition Score	Opposition Score	Opposition Score	Opposition Score	Opposition Score	Rank
Kasperi Salo	Men's singles	Joppien (GER); L 17–14, 7–15, 11–15	Did not advance				
Antti Viitikko	Men's singles	Shon S-M (KOR); L 12–15, 3–15	Did not advance				
Anu Weckström	Women's singles	Mori (JPN); L 5–11, 4–11	Did not advance				

== Canoeing ==
=== Sprint ===
Athlete	Event	Heats		Semifinals		Final	
Athlete	Event	Time	Rank	Time	Rank	Time	Rank
Kimmo Latvamäki	Men's K-1 500 m	1:40.645	5 q	1:40.753	6	Did not advance	
Jenni Honkanen	Women's K-1 500 m	1:55.244	4 q	1:53.050	2 Q	1:53.937	8

Qualification Legend: Q = Qualify to final; q = Qualify to semifinal

== Diving ==
Finnish divers qualified for two individual spots at the 2004 Olympic Games.

Men

Athlete	Event	Preliminaries		Semifinals		Final	
Athlete	Event	Points	Rank	Points	Rank	Points	Rank
Jukka Piekkanen	3 m springboard	359.22	29	Did not advance			
Joona Puhakka	3 m springboard	414.69	13 Q	624.60	14	Did not advance	

== Judo ==
Finland has qualified a single judoka.

Athlete	Event	Round of 32	Round of 16	Quarterfinals	Semifinals	Repechage 1	Repechage 2	Repechage 3	Final / BM	
Athlete	Event	Opposition Result	Opposition Result	Opposition Result	Opposition Result	Opposition Result	Opposition Result	Opposition Result	Opposition Result	Rank
Timo Peltola	Men's −100 kg	Vásquez (DOM); W 1001–0001	Makarau (BLR); L 0000–0200	Did not advance		Zhitkeyev (KAZ); L 0001–0221	Did not advance			

== Sailing ==
Finnish sailors have qualified one boat for each of the following events.

Women

Athlete	Event	Race											Net points	Final rank
Athlete	Event	1	2	3	4	5	6	7	8	9	10	M*	Net points	Final rank
Sari Multala	Europe	8	9	11	6	10	1	9	2	15	~~24~~	14	85	5

Open

Athlete	Event	Race																Net points	Final rank
Athlete	Event	1	2	3	4	5	6	7	8	9	10	11	12	13	14	15	M*	Net points	Final rank
Roope Suomalainen	Laser	~~35~~	5	24	12	10	12	33	32	11	13	—N/a					8	160	19
Thomas Johanson; Jukka Piirainen	49er	~~14~~	7	2	9	8	6	9	7	5	6	9	13	14	12	~~15~~	4	111	8

M = Medal race; OCS = On course side of the starting line; DSQ = Disqualified; DNF = Did not finish; DNS= Did not start; RDG = Redress given

== Shooting ==
Six Finnish shooters (four men and two women) qualified to compete in the following events:

Men

Athlete	Event	Qualification		Final	
Athlete	Event	Points	Rank	Points	Rank
Juha Hirvi	10 m air rifle	580	45	Did not advance	
Juha Hirvi	50 m rifle prone	594	=9	Did not advance	
Juha Hirvi	50 m rifle 3 positions	1160	15	Did not advance	
Marko Kemppainen	Skeet	125 =WR	1 Q	149 (4)	2nd place, silver medalist(s)
Petri Nummela	Trap	117	=14	Did not advance	
Joonas Olkkonen	Double trap	118	25	Did not advance	

Women

Athlete	Event	Qualification		Final	
Athlete	Event	Points	Rank	Points	Rank
Marjo Yli-Kiikka	10 m air rifle	392	=22	Did not advance	
Marjo Yli-Kiikka	50 m rifle 3 positions	571	=20	Did not advance	
Maarit Lepomäki	Skeet	67	=9	Did not advance	

== Swimming ==
Finnish swimmers earned qualifying standards in the following events (up to a maximum of 2 swimmers in each event at the A-standard time, and 1 at the B-standard time):

Men

Athlete	Event	Heat		Semifinal		Final	
Athlete	Event	Time	Rank	Time	Rank	Time	Rank
Jere Hård	50 m freestyle	23.33	41	Did not advance			
Jere Hård	100 m butterfly	54.02	28	Did not advance			
Matti Mäki	100 m backstroke	57.57	36	Did not advance			
Matti Mäki	200 m backstroke	2:06.29	33	Did not advance			
Jarno Pihlava	100 m breaststroke	1:01.99	13 Q	1:01.86	13	Did not advance	
Matti Rajakylä	100 m freestyle	50.67	33	Did not advance			
Jani Sievinen	200 m individual medley	2:02.79	20	Did not advance			
Jere Hård; Jarno Pihlava; Matti Rajakylä; Jani Sievinen	4 × 100 m medley relay	3:41.64	11	—N/a		Did not advance	

Women

Athlete	Event	Heat		Semifinal		Final	
Athlete	Event	Time	Rank	Time	Rank	Time	Rank
Eeva Saarinen	100 m breaststroke	1:11.39	23	Did not advance			
Eeva Saarinen	200 m breaststroke	2:34.17	22	Did not advance			
Hanna-Maria Seppälä	50 m freestyle	26.01	24	Did not advance			
Hanna-Maria Seppälä	100 m freestyle	56.01	=15 Q	55.59	12	Did not advance	
Hanna-Maria Seppälä	100 m backstroke	1:05.55	36	Did not advance			

== Taekwondo ==
Finland has qualified a single taekwondo jin.

Athlete	Event	Round of 16	Quarterfinals	Semifinals	Repechage 1	Repechage 2	Final / BM	
Athlete	Event	Opposition Result	Opposition Result	Opposition Result	Opposition Result	Opposition Result	Opposition Result	Rank
Teemu Heino	Men's +80 kg	Nguyen (VIE); L 5–8	Did not advance					

== Tennis ==
Finland nominated one male tennis player to compete in the tournament.

Athlete	Event	Round of 64	Round of 32	Round of 16	Quarterfinals	Semifinals	Final / BM	
Athlete	Event	Opposition Score	Opposition Score	Opposition Score	Opposition Score	Opposition Score	Opposition Score	Rank
Jarkko Nieminen	Men's singles	Lu Y-H (TPE); W 6–3, 6–3	Mirnyi (BLR); L 3–6, 4–6	Did not advance				

== Wrestling ==
Key:

- VT – Victory by Fall.
- PP – Decision by Points – the loser with technical points.
- PO – Decision by Points – the loser without technical points.

Men's Greco-Roman

Athlete	Event	Elimination Pool			Quarterfinal	Semifinal	Final / BM	
Athlete	Event	Opposition Result	Opposition Result	Rank	Opposition Result	Opposition Result	Opposition Result	Rank
Marko Yli-Hannuksela	−74 kg	Nagata (JPN); W 3–0 ^{PO}	Kobonov (KGZ); W 3–0 ^{PO}	1 Q	Azcuy (CUB); W 3–1 ^{PP}	Bucher (SUI); W 3–0 ^{PO}	Dokturishvili (UZB); L 1–3 ^{PP}	2nd place, silver medalist(s)
Juha Ahokas	−120 kg	Deák-Bárdos (HUN); L 0–3 ^{PO}	Barzi (IRI); L 1–3 ^{PP}	3	Did not advance			17

== See also ==
- Finland at the 2004 Summer Paralympics
