= 2009 World Wrestling Championships – Men's Greco-Roman 74 kg =

Men's Greco-Roman 74 kg at the 2009 World Championships
- Venue: Messecenter Herning
- Dates: 27 September 2009
- Competitors: 36 from 36 nations

Medalists
gold medal	Selçuk Çebi	Turkey
silver medal	Mark Madsen	Denmark
bronze medal	Aliaksandr Kikiniou	Belarus
bronze medal	Farshad Alizadeh	Iran

The men's Greco-Roman 74 kilograms is a competition featured at the 2009 World Wrestling Championships, and was held at the Messecenter Herning exhibition center in Herning, Denmark on September 27.

== Results ==
=== Finals ===
Semifinals				Final
Selçuk Çebi (TUR)	2	1
Konstantin Schneider (GER)	0	0		Selçuk Çebi (TUR)	1	6
Farshad Alizadeh (IRI)	0	1	0	Mark Madsen (DEN)	0	0
Mark Madsen (DEN)	2	0	3

=== Top half ===
==== Section 1 ====
Round of 64

Round of 32
Asset Adilov (KAZ)	0	0
Selçuk Çebi (TUR)	1	2
Goran Bulatović (MNE)	0	0
Julian Kwit (POL)	1	2
Alexander Brazón (VEN)	0	0
Aliaksandr Kikiniou (BLR)	1	2
Ilya Shafran (ISR)	1	0	0
Neven Žugaj (CRO)	0	1	1

Round of 16
Selçuk Çebi (TUR)	0	3	2
Julian Kwit (POL)	1	0	2
Aliaksandr Kikiniou (BLR)	2	0	1
Neven Žugaj (CRO)	0	1	0

Quarterfinals
Selçuk Çebi (TUR)	3	2
Aliaksandr Kikiniou (BLR)	0	0

==== Section 2 ====
Round of 64

Round of 32
Jung Tae-kyun (KOR)	0	0
Konstantin Schneider (GER)	3	1
Joakim Aardalen (NOR)	2	2
Ouyang Dongdong (CHN)	0	0
Tsukasa Tsurumaki (JPN)	0	3	1
Manuchar Kvirkvelia (GEO)	3	0	0
Felipe Macedo (BRA)	0	0
Evgeny Popov (RUS)	3	5

Round of 16
Konstantin Schneider (GER)	3	1
Joakim Aardalen (NOR)	0	0
Tsukasa Tsurumaki (JPN)	2	0	0
Evgeny Popov (RUS)	0	2	1

Quarterfinals
Konstantin Schneider (GER)	2	1
Evgeny Popov (RUS)	0	0

=== Bottom half ===
==== Section 3 ====
Round of 64

Round of 32
Aleksandrs Višņakovs (LAT)	0	0
Farshad Alizadeh (IRI)	1	2
Kanatbek Begaliev (KGZ)	0	0
Péter Bácsi (HUN)	2	1
Robert Rosengren (SWE)	0	0
Arsen Julfalakyan (ARM)	1	1
Christophe Guénot (FRA)	1	1
Aleksandr Kazakevič (LTU)	0	0

Round of 16
Farshad Alizadeh (IRI)	1	2
Péter Bácsi (HUN)	0	0
Arsen Julfalakyan (ARM)	2	0	0
Christophe Guénot (FRA)	0	2	1

Quarterfinals
Farshad Alizadeh (IRI)	2	3
Christophe Guénot (FRA)	0	1

==== Section 4 ====
Round of 64
Mailín Consuegra (CUB)	2	1
Murat Argin (SUI)	0	0
Armen Vardanyan (UKR)	0	0
Henri Välimäki (FIN)	1	1
Ionel Puşcaşu (ROU)	0	1	0
Jakhongir Muminov (UZB)	1	0	2
Ilian Georgiev (BUL)	3	1
Petr Novák (CZE)	0	0

Round of 32
Rafig Huseynov (AZE)	1	7
Juan José Ruiz (ESP)	0	0
Mark Madsen (DEN)	0	1	3
Justin Lester (USA)	4	0	0
Mailín Consuegra (CUB)	1	0	0
Henri Välimäki (FIN)	0	1	1
Jakhongir Muminov (UZB)	0	1	1
Ilian Georgiev (BUL)	1	0	0

Round of 16
Rafig Huseynov (AZE)	0	0
Mark Madsen (DEN)	2	3
Henri Välimäki (FIN)	2	1
Jakhongir Muminov (UZB)	0	0

Quarterfinals
Mark Madsen (DEN)	1	2
Henri Välimäki (FIN)	0	0

=== Repechage ===
Repechage round 2
Asset Adilov (KAZ)	2	0	2
Julian Kwit (POL)	0	3	0
Justin Lester (USA)	1	0
Rafig Huseynov (AZE)	3	4

Repechage round 3
Asset Adilov (KAZ)	0	0
Aliaksandr Kikiniou (BLR)	1	8
Rafig Huseynov (AZE)	1	1
Henri Välimäki (FIN)	0	0

Bronze medals
Aliaksandr Kikiniou (BLR)	2	1
Konstantin Schneider (GER)	0	0
Rafig Huseynov (AZE)	0	0
Farshad Alizadeh (IRI)	1	3
