= Wrestling at the 2010 Asian Games – Men's Greco-Roman 74 kg =

Men's Greco-Roman 74 kg at the 2010 Asian Games
- Venue: Huagong Gymnasium
- Date: 22 November 2010
- Competitors: 13 from 13 nations

Medalists
gold medal	Daniar Kobonov	Kyrgyzstan
silver medal	Tsukasa Tsurumaki	Japan
bronze medal	Farshad Alizadeh	Iran
bronze medal	Park Jin-sung	South Korea

The men's Greco-Roman 74 kilograms wrestling competition at the 2010 Asian Games in Guangzhou was held on 22 November 2010 at the Huagong Gymnasium.

This Greco-Roman wrestling competition consisted of a single-elimination tournament, with a repechage used to determine the winner of two bronze medals. The two finalists faced off for gold and silver medals. Each wrestler who lost to one of the two finalists moved into the repechage, culminating in a pair of bronze medal matches featuring the semifinal losers each facing the remaining repechage opponent from their half of the bracket.

Each bout consisted of up to three rounds, lasting two minutes apiece. The wrestler who scored more points in each round was the winner of that rounds; the bout finished when one wrestler had won two rounds (and thus the match).

== Schedule ==
All times are China Standard Time (UTC+08:00)

Date	Time	Event
Monday, 22 November 2010	09:30	1/8 finals
Monday, 22 November 2010	09:30	Quarterfinals
Monday, 22 November 2010	09:30	Semifinals
Monday, 22 November 2010	16:00	Repechages
Monday, 22 November 2010	17:00	Finals

== Results ==
Legend

- F — Won by fall

=== Main bracket ===
1/8 finals
Tsukasa Tsurumaki (JPN)	3	0	3
Farshad Alizadeh (IRI)	0	2	1
Chang Yongxiang (CHN)	4	1
Musaab Al-Nakadli (SYR)	0	0
Bakhit Sharif Badr (QAT)	0	0
Park Jin-sung (KOR)	2	7
Sanjay Kumar (IND)	0	0
Daniar Kobonov (KGZ)	1	1
Roman Melyoshin (KAZ)	4	9
Kyýas Esenow (TKM)	0	0

Quarterfinals
Ri Chol-hak (PRK)	1	2	0
Azizbek Murodov (UZB)	1	0	2
Daler Karimov (TJK)	0	0
Tsukasa Tsurumaki (JPN)	1	2
Chang Yongxiang (CHN)	0	5	0
Park Jin-sung (KOR)	1	1	3
Daniar Kobonov (KGZ)	3	0	3
Roman Melyoshin (KAZ)	0	1	0

Semifinals
Azizbek Murodov (UZB)	3	0	0
Tsukasa Tsurumaki (JPN)	0	2	1
Park Jin-sung (KOR)	1	0
Daniar Kobonov (KGZ)	0	3^{F}

Final
Tsukasa Tsurumaki (JPN)	0	0
Daniar Kobonov (KGZ)	1	5

=== Repechage ===
Repechage round 1
Farshad Alizadeh (IRI)	2	1
Daler Karimov (TJK)	0	0
Sanjay Kumar (IND)	0	0
Roman Melyoshin (KAZ)	1	3

Bronze medals
Farshad Alizadeh (IRI)	0	1	1
Azizbek Murodov (UZB)	2	0	0
Roman Melyoshin (KAZ)	0	1
Park Jin-sung (KOR)	1	3

== Final standing ==
Rank	Athlete
1st place, gold medalist(s)	Daniar Kobonov (KGZ)
2nd place, silver medalist(s)	Tsukasa Tsurumaki (JPN)
3rd place, bronze medalist(s)	Farshad Alizadeh (IRI)
3rd place, bronze medalist(s)	Park Jin-sung (KOR)
5	Azizbek Murodov (UZB)
5	Roman Melyoshin (KAZ)
7	Chang Yongxiang (CHN)
8	Ri Chol-hak (PRK)
9	Musaab Al-Nakadli (SYR)
10	Daler Karimov (TJK)
10	Sanjay Kumar (IND)
12	Bakhit Sharif Badr (QAT)
13	Kyýas Esenow (TKM)
