= 2014 European Wrestling Championships – Men's Greco-Roman 80 kg =

Wrestling competitions

The Men's Greco-Roman 80 kg is a competition featured at the 2014 European Wrestling Championships, and was held in Vantaa, Finland on 5 April 2014.

== Medalists ==
Gold	Péter Bácsi; Hungary
Silver	Selçuk Çebi; Turkey
Bronze	Giorgi Tsirekidze; Georgia
Bronze	Oleksandr Shyshman; Ukraine

== Results ==
Legend

- F — Won by fall

=== Final ===
Final
Selçuk Çebi (TUR)	0
Péter Bácsi (HUN)	1

=== Top half ===
Round of 32

Round of 16
Rafig Huseynov (AZE)	2
Oleksandr Shyshman (UKR)	8
Tadeusz Michalik (POL)	0
Selçuk Çebi (TUR)	1
Bekkhan Ozdoev (RUS)	3
Rasmus Tjørstad (NOR)	1
Viktar Sasunouski (BLR)	3^{F}
Julius Matuzevičius (LTU)	0

Quarterfinals
Oleksandr Shyshman (UKR)	0
Selçuk Çebi (TUR)	3
Bekkhan Ozdoev (RUS)	8
Viktar Sasunouski (BLR)	0

Semifinals
Selçuk Çebi (TUR)	6^{F}
Bekkhan Ozdoev (RUS)	0

=== Bottom half ===
Round of 32
Artur Omarov (CZE)	8
Nikolaos Varkas (GRE)	0
Petar Balo (SRB)	0
Péter Bácsi (HUN)	8
Hrach Hovhannisyan (ARM)	7^{F}
Česlavs Bestenis (LAT)	0
Damian Dietsche (SUI)	0
Michael Wagner (AUT)	8
Jarno Ålander (FIN)	1
Daniel Aleksandrov (BUL)	3
Giorgi Tsirekidze (GEO)	2
Pascal Eisele (GER)	0

Round of 16
Zakarias Berg (SWE)	8^{F}
Erkki Alak (EST)	4
Artur Omarov (CZE)	0
Péter Bácsi (HUN)	7
Hrach Hovhannisyan (ARM)	8
Michael Wagner (AUT)	0
Daniel Aleksandrov (BUL)	6
Giorgi Tsirekidze (GEO)	8

Quarterfinals
Zakarias Berg (SWE)	0
Péter Bácsi (HUN)	11
Hrach Hovhannisyan (ARM)	7
Giorgi Tsirekidze (GEO)	13

Semifinals
Péter Bácsi (HUN)	8
Giorgi Tsirekidze (GEO)	0

=== Repechage ===
Repechage round 1
Petar Balo (SRB)	1
Artur Omarov (CZE)	9

Repechage round 2
Tadeusz Michalik (POL)	1
Oleksandr Shyshman (UKR)	10^{F}
Artur Omarov (CZE)	4
Zakarias Berg (SWE)	7

Bronze medals
Oleksandr Shyshman (UKR)	8^{F}
Bekkhan Ozdoev (RUS)	3
Zakarias Berg (SWE)	3
Giorgi Tsirekidze (GEO)	6
