= Wrestling at the 2004 Summer Olympics – Men's Greco-Roman 74 kg =

Men's Greco-Roman 74 kg at the Games of the XXVIII Olympiad
- Venue: Ano Liosia Olympic Hall
- Date: 25–26 August 2004
- Competitors: 20 from 20 nations

Medalists
1st place, gold medalist(s)		Aleksandr Dokturishvili	Uzbekistan
2nd place, silver medalist(s)		Marko Yli-Hannuksela	Finland
3rd place, bronze medalist(s)		Varteres Samurgashev	Russia

The men's Greco-Roman 74 kilograms at the 2004 Summer Olympics as part of the wrestling program were held at the Ano Liosia Olympic Hall, August 25 to August 26.

The competition held with an elimination system of three or four wrestlers in each pool, with the winners qualify for the quarterfinals, semifinals and final by way of direct elimination.

== Schedule ==
All times are Eastern European Summer Time (UTC+03:00)

Date	Time	Event
25 August 2004	09:30	Round 1
25 August 2004	09:30	Round 2
25 August 2004	17:30	Round 3
26 August 2004	09:30	Qualification
26 August 2004	09:30	Semifinals
26 August 2004	17:30	Finals

== Results ==
Legend

- WO — Won by walkover

=== Elimination pools ===
==== Pool 1 ====
Pos	Athlete	Pld	W	L	CP	TP	Qualification
1	Filiberto Azcuy (CUB)	2	2	0	6	12	Knockout round
2	Choi Duk-hoon (KOR)	2	1	1	4	8	
3	Radosław Truszkowski (POL)	2	0	2	1	1	

Source: Official website

	Score		CP
Filiberto Azcuy (CUB)	6–2	Choi Duk-hoon (KOR)	3–1 PP
Radosław Truszkowski (POL)	0–6	Filiberto Azcuy (CUB)	0–3 PO
Choi Duk-hoon (KOR)	6–1	Radosław Truszkowski (POL)	3–1 PP

==== Pool 2 ====
Pos	Athlete	Pld	W	L	CP	TP	Qualification
1	Marko Yli-Hannuksela (FIN)	2	2	0	6	7	Knockout round
2	Daniar Kobonov (KGZ)	2	1	1	3	3	
3	Katsuhiko Nagata (JPN)	2	0	2	1	2	

Source: Official website

	Score		CP
Katsuhiko Nagata (JPN)	2–3	Daniar Kobonov (KGZ)	1–3 PP
Marko Yli-Hannuksela (FIN)	3–0	Katsuhiko Nagata (JPN)	3–0 PO
Daniar Kobonov (KGZ)	0–4	Marko Yli-Hannuksela (FIN)	0–3 PO

==== Pool 3 ====
Pos	Athlete	Pld	W	L	CP	TP	Qualification
1	Reto Bucher (SUI)	2	2	0	6	9	Knockout round
2	Saiyinjiya (CHN)	2	1	1	4	7	
3	Aliaksandr Kikiniou (BLR)	2	0	2	2	5	

Source: Official website

	Score		CP
Aliaksandr Kikiniou (BLR)	3–5	Saiyinjiya (CHN)	1–3 PP
Reto Bucher (SUI)	3–2	Aliaksandr Kikiniou (BLR)	3–1 PP
Saiyinjiya (CHN)	2–6	Reto Bucher (SUI)	1–3 PP

==== Pool 4 ====
Pos	Athlete	Pld	W	L	CP	TP	Qualification
1	Danil Khalimov (KAZ)	2	2	0	6	11	Knockout round
2	José Alberto Recuero (ESP)	2	1	1	5	4	
3	Yasha Manasherov (ISR)	2	0	2	0	0	

Source: Official website

	Score		CP
Danil Khalimov (KAZ)	8–0	Yasha Manasherov (ISR)	3–0 PO
José Alberto Recuero (ESP)	2–3	Danil Khalimov (KAZ)	1–3 PP
Yasha Manasherov (ISR)	0–2 Fall	José Alberto Recuero (ESP)	0–4 TO

==== Pool 5 ====
Pos	Athlete	Pld	W	L	CP	TP	Qualification
1	Varteres Samurgashev (RUS)	3	3	0	9	21	Knockout round
2	Konstantin Schneider (GER)	3	2	1	8	11	
3	Volodymyr Shatskykh (UKR)	3	1	2	4	0	
4	Mohammad Babulfath (SWE)	3	0	3	0	0	

Source: Official website

	Score		CP
Mohammad Babulfath (SWE)	0–4	Konstantin Schneider (GER)	0–3 PO
Varteres Samurgashev (RUS)	4–0	Volodymyr Shatskykh (UKR)	3–0 PO
Mohammad Babulfath (SWE)	0–9	Varteres Samurgashev (RUS)	0–3 PO
Konstantin Schneider (GER)	4–0 Fall	Volodymyr Shatskykh (UKR)	4–0 TO
Mohammad Babulfath (SWE)	WO	Volodymyr Shatskykh (UKR)	0–4 PA
Konstantin Schneider (GER)	3–8	Varteres Samurgashev (RUS)	1–3 PP

==== Pool 6 ====
Pos	Athlete	Pld	W	L	CP	TP	Qualification
1	Aleksandr Dokturishvili (UZB)	3	3	0	9	16	Knockout round
2	Tamás Berzicza (HUN)	3	2	1	8	5	
3	Alexios Kolitsopoulos (GRE)	3	1	2	4	6	
4	Vugar Aslanov (AZE)	3	0	3	1	2	

Source: Official website

	Score		CP
Vugar Aslanov (AZE)	2–2	Alexios Kolitsopoulos (GRE)	1–3 PP
Aleksandr Dokturishvili (UZB)	4–2	Tamás Berzicza (HUN)	3–1 PP
Vugar Aslanov (AZE)	0–4	Aleksandr Dokturishvili (UZB)	0–3 PO
Alexios Kolitsopoulos (GRE)	0–3	Tamás Berzicza (HUN)	0–3 PO
Vugar Aslanov (AZE)	WO	Tamás Berzicza (HUN)	0–4 PA
Alexios Kolitsopoulos (GRE)	4–8	Aleksandr Dokturishvili (UZB)	1–3 PP

=== Knockout round ===
Qualification
Filiberto Azcuy (CUB)	1
Marko Yli-Hannuksela (FIN)	3
Reto Bucher (SUI)	3
Danil Khalimov (KAZ)	0

Semifinals
Marko Yli-Hannuksela (FIN)	3
Reto Bucher (SUI)	0
Varteres Samurgashev (RUS)	2
Aleksandr Dokturishvili (UZB)	5

Gold medal match
Marko Yli-Hannuksela (FIN)	1
Aleksandr Dokturishvili (UZB)	4
Bronze medal match
Reto Bucher (SUI)	0
Varteres Samurgashev (RUS)	10

Classification 5–6
Filiberto Azcuy (CUB)
Danil Khalimov (KAZ)	WO

== Final standing ==
Rank	Athlete
1st place, gold medalist(s)	Aleksandr Dokturishvili (UZB)
2nd place, silver medalist(s)	Marko Yli-Hannuksela (FIN)
3rd place, bronze medalist(s)	Varteres Samurgashev (RUS)
4	Reto Bucher (SUI)
5	Danil Khalimov (KAZ)
6	Filiberto Azcuy (CUB)
7	Konstantin Schneider (GER)
8	Tamás Berzicza (HUN)
9	José Alberto Recuero (ESP)
10	Choi Duk-hoon (KOR)
11	Saiyinjiya (CHN)
12	Alexios Kolitsopoulos (GRE)
13	Volodymyr Shatskykh (UKR)
14	Daniar Kobonov (KGZ)
15	Aliaksandr Kikiniou (BLR)
16	Katsuhiko Nagata (JPN)
17	Vugar Aslanov (AZE)
18	Radosław Truszkowski (POL)
19	Yasha Manasherov (ISR)
20	Mohammad Babulfath (SWE)
