= Péter Bácsi =

Hungarian Greco-Roman wrestler

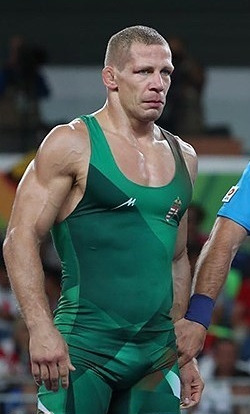
- Péter Bácsi at the 2016 Olympics

Personal information
- Nationality: Hungary
- Born: 15 May 1983 (age 43) Budapest, Hungary
- Height: 1.75 m (5 ft 9 in)
- Weight: 74 kg (163 lb)

Sport
- Style: Greco-Roman wrestling
- Club: Ferencvárosi TC
- Coach: András Sike
Medal record
Representing Hungary
World Championships
Gold medal – first place	2014 Tashkent	80 kg
Gold medal – first place	2018 Budapest	82 kg
European Championships
Gold medal – first place	2008 Tampere	74 kg
Gold medal – first place	2014 Vantaa	80 kg
Silver medal – second place	2011 Dortmund	74 kg
Bronze medal – third place	2010 Baku	74 kg

Péter Bácsi (born 15 May 1983) is an amateur Hungarian Greco-Roman wrestler, who competes in the middleweight category. Two-time (2014 and 2018) world champion, he is also a three-time Olympian, and a four-time medalist in his division at the European Championships.

Bacsi made his international debut at the 2008 Summer Olympics, where he competed in the 74 kg class. He first defeated United States' T.C. Dantzler, Armenia's Arsen Julfalakyan, and Russia's Varteres Samourgachev in the preliminary rounds, before losing out to Georgia's Manuchar Kvirkvelia in the semi-finals, by a technical fall. Because his opponent advanced further into the final match, Bacsi automatically qualified for the bronze medal bout, where he was defeated by France's Christophe Guénot, with a classification score of 1–3.

At the 2012 Summer Olympics in London, Bacsi was injured in the second preliminary match of the 74 kg class, losing to Aleksandr Kazakevič.

== Major results ==
Year	Tournament	Venue	Result	Event
2005	Universiade	İzmir, Turkey	5th	Greco-Roman 74 kg
2007	World Championships	Baku, Azerbaijan	7th	Greco-Roman 74 kg
2008	European Championships	Tampere, Finland	1st	Greco-Roman 74 kg
2008	Olympic Games	Beijing, China	5th	Greco-Roman 74 kg
2009	European Championships	Vilnius, Lithuania	12th	Greco-Roman 74 kg
2009	World Championships	Herning, Denmark	19th	Greco-Roman 74 kg
2010	European Championships	Baku, Azerbaijan	3rd	Greco-Roman 74 kg
2010	World Championships	Moscow, Russia	20th	Greco-Roman 74 kg
2011	European Championships	Dortmund, Germany	2nd	Greco-Roman 74 kg
2011	World Championships	Istanbul, Turkey	8th	Greco-Roman 74 kg
2012	Olympic Games	London, United Kingdom	14th	Greco-Roman 74 kg
2013	European Championships	(Georgia (country)) Tbilisi, Georgia	10th	Greco-Roman 84 kg
2014	European Championships	Vantaa, Finland	1st	Greco-Roman 80 kg
2014	World Championships	Tashkent, Uzbekistan	1st	Greco-Roman 80 kg
2015	World Championships	Las Vegas, United States	8th	Greco-Roman 75 kg
2016	Olympic Games	Rio de Janeiro, Brazil	5th	Greco-Roman 75 kg
2017	European Championships	Novi Sad, Serbia	11th	Greco-Roman 80 kg
2018	World Championships	Budapest, Hungary	1st	Greco-Roman 82 kg
