= Alexios Kolitsopoulos =

Greek Greco-Roman wrestler

Personal information
- Full name: Alexios Kolitsopoulos
- Nationality: Greece
- Born: 24 April 1975 (age 51) Athens, Greece
- Height: 1.74 m (5 ft 8 1/2 in)
- Weight: 74 kg (163 lb)

Sport
- Country: Greece
- Style: Greco-Roman
- Club: Iraklis Peristeri
- Coach: Charalampos Cholidis
Medal record
Men's Greco-Roman wrestling
Representing Greece
Mediterranean Games
Silver medal – second place	2001 Tunis	76 kg

Alexios Kolitsopoulos (Greek: Αλέξιος Κολιτσόπουλος; born April 24, 1975) is a retired amateur Greek Greco-Roman wrestler, who competed in the men's middleweight category. He won a silver medal in the 76-kg division at the 2001 Mediterranean Games in Tunis, Tunisia, and had been selected to the nation's Olympic wrestling team when Greece hosted the 2004 Summer Olympics in Athens. Kolitsopoulos also trained for Iraklis Wrestling Club in Peristeri, under his personal coach Charalampos Cholidis.

Kolitsopoulos qualified for the Greek squad in the men's 74 kg class at the 2004 Summer Olympics in Athens. He filled up an entry by the International Federation of Association Wrestling and the Hellenic Olympic Committee, as Greece received an automatic berth for being the host nation. Amassed the home crowd inside Ano Liossia Olympic Hall, Kolitsopoulos started the prelim pool with a 2–2 victory and no penalty over Azerbaijan's Vugar Aslanov in overtime, before he lost his next matches each to three-time Olympian Tamás Berzicza of Hungary (3–0) and eventual Olympic champion Aleksandr Dokturishvili of Uzbekistan (8–4). Placing third in the pool round and twelfth overall, Kolitsopoulos failedto advance to the quarterfinals.
