= Selçuk Çebi =

Turkish wrestler (born 1982)

Personal information
- Nationality: Turkish
- Born: June 3, 1982 (age 44) Araklı, Trabzon, Turkey
- Height: 1.70 m (5 ft 7 in)
- Weight: 74 kg (163 lb)

Sport
- Country: Turkey
- Sport: Sport wrestling
- Event: Greco-Romen
- Club: İstanbul Büyükşehir Belediyesi Spor Kulübü
- Coached by: Mustafa Şahin-Hakkı Başar
Medal record
Men's Greco-Roman wrestling
Representing Turkey
World Championships
Gold medal – first place	2015 Las Vegas	80 kg
Gold medal – first place	2010 Moscow	74 kg
Gold medal – first place	2009 Herning	74 kg
Silver medal – second place	2011 Istanbul	74 kg
Bronze medal – third place	2014 Tashkent	80 kg
European Championships
Silver medal – second place	2014 Vantaa	80 kg
Bronze medal – third place	2009 Vilnius	74 kg
World Cup
Gold medal – first place	2013 Tehran	84 kg
Gold medal – first place	2002 Cairo	66 kg
Military World Games
Silver medal – second place	2003 Istanbul	66 kg
Mediterranean Games
Gold medal – first place	2013 Mersin	84 kg
Gold medal – first place	2005 Almería	66 kg
Vehbi Emre & Hamit Kaplan Tournament
Gold medal – first place	2013 Istanbul	84 kg
Bronze medal – third place	2014 Istanbul	80 kg
Summer Universiade
Gold medal – first place	2005 İzmir	66 kg
World University Championship
Gold medal – first place	2006 Oulan Bator	66 kg
World Juniors Championships
Bronze medal – third place	2001 Tashkent	69 kg
European Juniors Championships
Gold medal – first place	2002 Subotica	69 kg
European Cadets Championships
Gold medal – first place	1999 Nykobing Falster	69 kg
Gold medal – first place	1998 Pretoria	69 kg

Selçuk Çebi (born June 3, 1982 in Araklı, Trabzon Province, Turkey) is a Turkish wrestler. He is a three-time world champion in Greco-Roman wrestling. He studied at Ondokuz Mayıs University.

While receiving secondary education at İmam Hatip Lisesi in his native Araklı, Çebi was advised by his father to sign up for wrestling at age 12. He became the only professional wrestler in the family of seven children. Çebi graduated from the College of Physical Education of the Ondokuz Mayıs University in Samsun, after which he practiced wrestling at the Trabzon Belediyespor and Çaykur Rizespor. He obtained his license at the İstanbul Büyükşehir Belediyesi S.K., but continued to train in Trabzon.

He won a gold medal for Turkey at the 2005 Mediterranean Games held in Almería, where he competed at 66 kg.

He became a gold-medal winner in 74 kg at the 2009 World Wrestling Championships held in Herning.

Selçuk Çebi is officially sponsored by Herbalife.

He is married to Kübra Çebi and has a son named Yusuf.

== Results ==
- 2005 Summer Universiade – Gold medal
  - Round 1: Bye
  - Round 2: Defeated Askhat Dilmukhamedov (KAZ), 2–0
  - Round 3: Defeated Lukasz Tarnecki (POL), 2–0
  - Semifinal: Defeated Justin Lester (USA), 2–1
  - Final: Defeated Ji Hyun Jung (KOR), 2–0
- 2009 European Wrestling Championships – Bronze medal
  - Round 1: Defeated Jose Joan Ruiz (ESP), 2–0
  - Round 2: Defeated Alain Hassli (FRA), 2–0
  - Round 3: Defeated Valtteri Moisio (FIN), 2–0
  - Semifinal: Lost to Volodymyr Shatskykh (UKR), 0–2
  - Bronze Medal Final: Defeated Genadi Vogisvili (GEO), 2–0
- 2010 World Championship – Gold medal
  - Round 1: Bye
  - Round 2: Defeated Mota Brea (DOM), 2–0 (2–0, 2–0)
  - Round 3: Defeated Rafig Huseynov (AZE), 2–1 (0–1, 1–0, 1–0)
  - Round 4: Defeated Zugaj Naven (CRO), 2–1 (0–1, 1–0, 1–0)
  - Semifinal: Defeated Imil Sharafetdinov (RUS), 2–0 (6–0, 1–0)
  - Final: Defeated Arsen Julfalakyan (ARM), 2–1 (0–1, 1–0, 1–0)
