= 2014 World Wrestling Championships – Men's Greco-Roman 80 kg =

Men's Greco-Roman 80 kg at the 2014 World Championships
- Venue: Gymnastics Sport Palace
- Dates: 13 September 2014
- Competitors: 29 from 29 nations

Medalists
gold medal	Péter Bácsi	Hungary
silver medal	Evgeny Saleev	Russia
bronze medal	Selçuk Çebi	Turkey
bronze medal	Jim Pettersson	Sweden

The men's Greco-Roman 80 kilograms is a competition featured at the 2014 World Wrestling Championships, and was held in Tashkent, Uzbekistan on 13 September 2014.

This Greco-Roman wrestling competition consisted of a single-elimination tournament, with a repechage used to determine the winners of two bronze medals.

== Results ==
Legend

- F — Won by fall

=== Final ===
Final
Evgeny Saleev (RUS)	1
Péter Bácsi (HUN)	2

=== Top half ===
Round of 32
Azamat Kustubayev (KAZ)	2
Habibollah Akhlaghi (IRI)	3
Harpreet Singh Sandhu (IND)	0
Evgeny Saleev (RUS)	8
Jonas Bossert (SUI)	6^{F}
Joe Rau (USA)	5
Pascal Eisele (GER)	10^{F}
Giorgi Tsirekidze (GEO)	6
Božo Starčević (CRO)	3
Viktar Sasunouski (BLR)	0

Round of 16
Daniel Aleksandrov (BUL)	1
Selçuk Çebi (TUR)	3
Nikolaos Varkas (GRE)	0
Habibollah Akhlaghi (IRI)	5
Evgeny Saleev (RUS)	9
Jonas Bossert (SUI)	0
Pascal Eisele (GER)	3
Božo Starčević (CRO)	4

Quarterfinals
Selçuk Çebi (TUR)	2
Habibollah Akhlaghi (IRI)	1
Evgeny Saleev (RUS)	8
Božo Starčević (CRO)	0

Semifinals
Selçuk Çebi (TUR)	0
Evgeny Saleev (RUS)	4

=== Bottom half ===
Round of 32
Petar Balo (SRB)	0
Aleksandr Kazakevič (LTU)	5
Emin Ahmadov (AZE)	5
Rustam Sultonov (UZB)	2
Firdaus Rofiev (TJK)	0
Péter Bácsi (HUN)	8^{F}
Michael Wagner (AUT)	2
Jim Pettersson (SWE)	7
Tadeusz Michalik (POL)	2
Aishan Aisha (CHN)	0
Oleksandr Shyshman (UKR)	9
Pavel Powada (CZE)	0
Skander Missaoui (TUN)	10
Masato Sumi (JPN)	0
Hrach Hovhannisyan (ARM)	2
Kim June-hyoung (KOR)	2

Round of 16
Aleksandr Kazakevič (LTU)	2
Emin Ahmadov (AZE)	0
Péter Bácsi (HUN)	6
Jim Pettersson (SWE)	3
Tadeusz Michalik (POL)	4
Oleksandr Shyshman (UKR)	0
Skander Missaoui (TUN)	1
Kim June-hyoung (KOR)	2

Quarterfinals
Aleksandr Kazakevič (LTU)	0
Péter Bácsi (HUN)	4
Tadeusz Michalik (POL)	1
Kim June-hyoung (KOR)	0

Semifinals
Péter Bácsi (HUN)	10
Tadeusz Michalik (POL)	2

=== Repechage ===
Repechage round 1
Harpreet Singh Sandhu (IND)	6
Jonas Bossert (SUI)	1
Firdaus Rofiev (TJK)	1
Jim Pettersson (SWE)	9

Repechage round 2
Harpreet Singh Sandhu (IND)	0
Božo Starčević (CRO)	5
Jim Pettersson (SWE)	1
Aleksandr Kazakevič (LTU)	0

Bronze medals
Božo Starčević (CRO)	0
Selçuk Çebi (TUR)	1
Jim Pettersson (SWE)	4
Tadeusz Michalik (POL)	0
