= Farshad Alizadeh =

Iranian wrestler

Personal information
- Native name: فرشاد علیزاده کاله کشی
- Full name: Farshad Alizadeh
- Nationality: Iranian
- Born: June 9, 1985 (age 41) Tehran, Iran
- Height: 1.72 m (5 ft 8 in)

Sport
- Country: Iran
- Sport: Sport wrestling
- Event: Greco-Roman 84kg
Medal record
Representing Iran
Men's Greco-Roman wrestling
World Championships
Bronze medal – third place	2009 Herning	74 kg
Asian Games
Bronze medal – third place	2010 Guangzhou	74 kg
Asian Championships
Gold medal – first place	2009 Pattaya	74 kg

Farshad Alizadeh Kalehkeshi (Persian: فرشاد عليزاده كاله كشى) is an Iranian wrestler.
