= Wrestling at the 2010 Commonwealth Games – Men's Greco-Roman 74 kg =

Men's Greco-Roman 74 kg competition at the 2010 Commonwealth Games in New Delhi, India, was held on 5 October at the Indira Gandhi Arena.

== Medalists ==
Gold	Sanjay Kumar; India
Silver	Richard Brian Addinall; South Africa
Bronze	Hassan Shahsavan; Australia

=== Bracket ===
Quarterfinals
Hassan Shahsavan (AUS)
BYE
Richard Brian Addinall (RSA)	4	1	0
Muhammad Ali (PAK)	0	0	0
Perefegha Kiribein (NGR)	4	0	0
Tebitara Ueresi (SOL)	3	0	0
Sanjay Kumar (IND)	1	2	0
Laupule Ekeroma (SAM)	0	0	0

Semifinals
Hassan Shahsavan (AUS)	1	0	0
Richard Brian Addinall (RSA)	0	2	2
Perefegha Kiribein (NGR)	0	0	0
Sanjay Kumar (IND)	1	1	0

Finals
Richard Brian Addinall (RSA)	0	0	0
Sanjay Kumar (IND)	1	1	0

=== Repechage ===
Quarterfinals	Semifinals				Bronze Medal Bout
	Muhammad Ali (PAK)	0	0	0
	Hassan Shahsavan (AUS)	6	1	0
					Hassan Shahsavan (AUS)	2	1	0
					Perefegha Kiribein (NGR)	0	0	0
	Laupule Ekeroma (SAM)	0	0	0
	Perefegha Kiribein (NGR)	7	7	0

== See also ==
Wrestling at the 2010 Commonwealth Games
