= 2018 European Wrestling Championships – Men's Greco-Roman 87 kg =

The Men's Greco-Roman 87 kg is a competition featured at the 2018 European Wrestling Championships, and was held in Kaspiysk, Russia on April 30 and May 1.

== Medalists ==
Gold	Robert Kobliashvili; Georgia
Silver	Bekkhan Ozdoev; Russia
Bronze	Zakarias Berg; Sweden
Bronze	Denis Kudla; Germany

== Results ==
Legend

- F — Won by fall

=== Final ===
Final
Robert Kobliashvili (GEO)	3
Bekkhan Ozdoev (RUS)	2

=== Top half ===
Round of 32

Round of 16
Dimitrios Tsekeridis (GRE)	0
Mikita Klimovich (BLR)	3
Stepan Shelemekh (UKR)	8^{F}
Nikolaj Dobrev (SRB)	0
Artur Omarov (CZE)	0
Zakarias Berg (SWE)	8
Tarek Abdelslam (BUL)	1
Robert Kobliashvili (GEO)	5

Quarterfinals
Mikita Klimovich (BLR)	5
Stepan Shelemekh (UKR)	1
Zakarias Berg (SWE)	1
Robert Kobliashvili (GEO)	2

Semifinals
Mikita Klimovich (BLR)	0
Robert Kobliashvili (GEO)	8

=== Bottom half ===
Round of 32
Rami Hietaniemi (FIN)	4
Fabio Parisi (ITA)	3
Eerik Aps (EST)	0
Denis Kudla (GER)	3
Tadeusz Michalik (POL)	2
Metehan Başar (TUR)	2
Pedro García (ESP)	0
Artur Shahinyan (ARM)	9
Julius Matuzevičius (LTU)	2
Bekkhan Ozdoev (RUS)	11

Round of 16
Islam Abbasov (AZE)	9
Roman Zhernovetski (ISR)	0
Viktor Lőrincz (HUN)	4
Rami Hietaniemi (FIN)	0
Denis Kudla (GER)	5
Tadeusz Michalik (POL)	5
Artur Shahinyan (ARM)	1
Bekkhan Ozdoev (RUS)	9

Quarterfinals
Islam Abbasov (AZE)	3
Viktor Lőrincz (HUN)	1
Denis Kudla (GER)	0
Bekkhan Ozdoev (RUS)	2^{F}

Semifinals
Islam Abbasov (AZE)	3
Bekkhan Ozdoev (RUS)	4

=== Repechage ===
Repechage round 1
Julius Matuzevičius (LTU)	0
Artur Shahinyan (ARM)	7

Repechage round 2
Tarek Abdelslam (BUL)	1
Zakarias Berg (SWE)	9
Artur Shahinyan (ARM)	3
Denis Kudla (GER)	7

Bronze medals
Zakarias Berg (SWE)	9
Mikita Klimovich (BLR)	0
Denis Kudla (GER)	3
Islam Abbasov (AZE)	1
