= 2004 Asian Wrestling Championships =

Freestyle
- Host city: Tehran, Iran
- Dates: 16–18 April 2004
- Stadium: Azadi Indoor Stadium

Greco-Roman
- Host city: Almaty, Kazakhstan
- Dates: 8–9 May 2004
- Stadium: Baluan Sholak Sports Palace

Women
- Host city: Tokyo, Japan
- Dates: 22–23 May 2004
- Stadium: Olympic Youth Memorial Center

Champions
- Freestyle: Iran
- Greco-Roman: Kazakhstan
- Women: Japan

The following is the final results of the 2004 Asian Wrestling Championships.

== Medal table ==
Rank	Nation	Gold	Silver	Bronze	Total
1	Japan	6	1	2	9
2	Kazakhstan	3	3	1	7
3	Iran	3	2	3	8
4	Uzbekistan	3	0	2	5
5	South Korea	2	5	5	12
6	Kyrgyzstan	1	4	0	5
7	Mongolia	1	2	5	8
8	China	1	1	2	4
9	North Korea	1	0	0	1
10	India	0	2	1	3
11	Vietnam	0	1	0	1
Totals (11 entries)		21	21	21	63

== Team ranking ==
Rank	Men's freestyle		Men's Greco-Roman		Women's freestyle	
Rank	Team	Points	Team	Points	Team	Points
1	Iran	63	Kazakhstan	64	Japan	63
2	Mongolia	45	South Korea	60	Mongolia	57
3	Uzbekistan	40	Uzbekistan	48	South Korea	45
4	Japan	40	Iran	46	India	44
5	South Korea	40	Kyrgyzstan	42	China	41
6	India	33	Japan	32	Uzbekistan	22
7	Kazakhstan	26	India	23	Vietnam	20
8	Iraq	17	Iraq	11	Kazakhstan	17
9	Afghanistan	17	North Korea	10	Chinese Taipei	16
10	North Korea	15	Vietnam	10	Thailand	15

== Medal summary ==
=== Men's freestyle ===
Event	Gold	Silver	Bronze
55 kg	Adkhamjon Achilov; Uzbekistan	Bayaraagiin Naranbaatar; Mongolia	Kim Hyo-sub; South Korea
60 kg	Ri Yong-chol; North Korea	Morad Mohammadi; Iran	Jung Young-ho; South Korea
66 kg	Kazuhiko Ikematsu; Japan	Hassan Tahmasebi; Iran	Buyanjavyn Batzorig; Mongolia
74 kg	Mehdi Sadeghnejad; Iran	Sujeet Maan; India	Kunihiko Obata; Japan
84 kg	Fereydoun Ghanbari; Iran	Moon Eui-jae; South Korea	Magomed Kurugliyev; Kazakhstan
96 kg	Magomed Ibragimov; Uzbekistan	Aleksey Krupnyakov; Kyrgyzstan	Hossein Khaleghifar; Iran
120 kg	Fardin Masoumi; Iran	Palwinder Singh Cheema; India	Dorjpalamyn Gankhuyag; Mongolia

=== Men's Greco-Roman ===
Event	Gold	Silver	Bronze
55 kg	Asset Imanbayev; Kazakhstan	Im Dae-won; South Korea	Hassan Rangraz; Iran
60 kg	Jung Ji-hyun; South Korea	Nurbakyt Tengizbayev; Kazakhstan	Dilshod Aripov; Uzbekistan
66 kg	Kim In-sub; South Korea	Roman Melyoshin; Kazakhstan	Masaki Izena; Japan
74 kg	Aleksandr Dokturishvili; Uzbekistan	Danil Khalimov; Kazakhstan	Choi Duk-hoon; South Korea
84 kg	Abdulla Zhabrailov; Kazakhstan	Janarbek Kenjeev; Kyrgyzstan	Kim Jung-sub; South Korea
96 kg	Gennady Chkhaidze; Kyrgyzstan	Han Tae-young; South Korea	Aleksey Cheglakov; Uzbekistan
120 kg	Georgiy Tsurtsumia; Kazakhstan	Dilshot Hadjiev; Kyrgyzstan	Sajjad Barzi; Iran

=== Women's freestyle ===
Event	Gold	Silver	Bronze
48 kg	Chiharu Icho; Japan	Lê Thị Trang; Vietnam	Deng Weichan; China
51 kg	Tsogtbazaryn Enkhjargal; Mongolia	Yuri Kai; Japan	Kim Hyung-joo; South Korea
55 kg	Saori Yoshida; Japan	Lee Na-lae; South Korea	Naidangiin Otgonjargal; Mongolia
59 kg	Su Lihui; China	Kim Hee-jeong; South Korea	Alka Tomar; India
63 kg	Kaori Icho; Japan	Su Huihua; China	Ochirbatyn Nasanburmaa; Mongolia
67 kg	Norie Saito; Japan	Yana Panova; Kyrgyzstan	Dalkh-Ochiryn Sugar; Mongolia
72 kg	Kyoko Hamaguchi; Japan	Ochirbatyn Burmaa; Mongolia	Zhang Dan; China

== Participating nations ==
=== Men's freestyle ===
64 competitors from 14 nations competed.

- Afghanistan (6)
- Chinese Taipei (3)
- India (6)
- Iran (7)
- Iraq (4)
- Japan (6)
- Kazakhstan (5)
- Kyrgyzstan (2)
- Lebanon (2)
- Mongolia (6)
- North Korea (2)
- South Korea (7)
- Tajikistan (2)
- Uzbekistan (6)

=== Men's Greco-Roman ===
53 competitors from 11 nations competed.

- Chinese Taipei (2)
- India (5)
- Iran (7)
- Iraq (2)
- Japan (5)
- Kazakhstan (7)
- Kyrgyzstan (6)
- North Korea (2)
- South Korea (7)
- Uzbekistan (7)
- Vietnam (3)

=== Women's freestyle ===
54 competitors from 11 nations competed.

- China (5)
- Chinese Taipei (4)
- India (7)
- Japan (7)
- Kazakhstan (3)
- Kyrgyzstan (2)
- Mongolia (7)
- South Korea (7)
- Thailand (5)
- Uzbekistan (4)
- Vietnam (3)
