= Wrestling at the 2002 Asian Games – Men's Greco-Roman 74 kg =

Men's Greco-Roman 74 kg at the 2002 Asian Games
- Venue: Yangsan Gymnasium
- Date: 3–4 October 2002
- Competitors: 13 from 13 nations

Medalists
gold medal	Kim Jin-soo	South Korea
silver medal	Danil Khalimov	Kazakhstan
bronze medal	Parviz Zeidvand	Iran

The men's Greco-Roman 74 kilograms wrestling competition at the 2002 Asian Games in Busan was held on 3 October and 4 October at the Yangsan Gymnasium.

The competition held with an elimination system of three or four wrestlers in each pool, with the winners qualify for the semifinals and final by way of direct elimination.

== Schedule ==
All times are Korea Standard Time (UTC+09:00)

Date	Time	Event
Thursday, 3 October 2002	10:00	Round 1
Thursday, 3 October 2002	16:00	Round 2
Friday, 4 October 2002	10:00	Round 3
Friday, 4 October 2002	10:00	1/2 finals
Friday, 4 October 2002	16:00	Finals

== Results ==
Legend

- WO — Won by walkover

=== Preliminary ===
==== Pool 1 ====
Pos	Athlete	Pld	W	L	CP	TP	Qualification
1	Ruslan Biktyakov (UZB)	2	2	0	6	9	Knockout round
2	Janarbek Kenjeev (KGZ)	2	1	1	4	0	
3	Mẫn Bá Xuân (VIE)	2	0	2	1	2	

Source: Report

	Score		CP
Ruslan Biktyakov (UZB)	4–0	Janarbek Kenjeev (KGZ)	3–0 PO
Mẫn Bá Xuân (VIE)	2–5	Ruslan Biktyakov (UZB)	1–3 PP
Janarbek Kenjeev (KGZ)	WO	Mẫn Bá Xuân (VIE)	4–0 PA

==== Pool 2 ====
Pos	Athlete	Pld	W	L	CP	TP	Qualification
1	Kim Jin-soo (KOR)	2	2	0	7	14	Knockout round
2	Saiyinjiya (CHN)	2	1	1	4	11	
3	Ranbir Singh (IND)	2	0	2	0	0	

Source: Report

	Score		CP
Saiyinjiya (CHN)	11–0	Ranbir Singh (IND)	4–0 ST
Kim Jin-soo (KOR)	3–0	Saiyinjiya (CHN)	3–0 PO
Ranbir Singh (IND)	0–11	Kim Jin-soo (KOR)	0–4 ST

==== Pool 3 ====
Pos	Athlete	Pld	W	L	CP	TP	Qualification
1	Parviz Zeidvand (IRI)	2	2	0	8	23	Knockout round
2	Ahmad El-Habeche (LIB)	2	1	1	3	6	
3	Mohammed Nawaf (QAT)	2	0	2	0	0	

Source: Report

	Score		CP
Parviz Zeidvand (IRI)	10–0	Ahmad El-Habeche (LIB)	4–0 ST
Mohammed Nawaf (QAT)	0–13	Parviz Zeidvand (IRI)	0–4 ST
Ahmad El-Habeche (LIB)	6–0	Mohammed Nawaf (QAT)	3–0 PO

==== Pool 4 ====
Pos	Athlete	Pld	W	L	CP	TP	Qualification
1	Danil Khalimov (KAZ)	3	3	0	11	23	Knockout round
2	Katsuhiko Nagata (JPN)	3	2	1	9	22	
3	Michael Baletin (PHI)	3	1	2	4	4	
4	Abdullahbik Baikzada (AFG)	3	0	3	0	0	

Source: Report

	Score		CP
Danil Khalimov (KAZ)	2–1	Katsuhiko Nagata (JPN)	3–1 PP
Michael Baletin (PHI)	4–0 Fall	Abdullahbik Baikzada (AFG)	4–0 TO
Danil Khalimov (KAZ)	10–0	Michael Baletin (PHI)	4–0 ST
Katsuhiko Nagata (JPN)	10–0	Abdullahbik Baikzada (AFG)	4–0 ST
Danil Khalimov (KAZ)	11–0	Abdullahbik Baikzada (AFG)	4–0 ST
Katsuhiko Nagata (JPN)	11–0	Michael Baletin (PHI)	4–0 ST

=== Knockout round ===
1/2 finals
Ruslan Biktyakov (UZB)	5
Kim Jin-soo (KOR)	5
Parviz Zeidvand (IRI)	1
Danil Khalimov (KAZ)	3

Final
Kim Jin-soo (KOR)	3
Danil Khalimov (KAZ)	3
3rd–4th place
Ruslan Biktyakov (UZB)	0
Parviz Zeidvand (IRI)	3

== Final standing ==
Rank	Athlete
1st place, gold medalist(s)	Kim Jin-soo (KOR)
2nd place, silver medalist(s)	Danil Khalimov (KAZ)
3rd place, bronze medalist(s)	Parviz Zeidvand (IRI)
4	Ruslan Biktyakov (UZB)
5	Katsuhiko Nagata (JPN)
6	Saiyinjiya (CHN)
7	Michael Baletin (PHI)
8	Janarbek Kenjeev (KGZ)
9	Ahmad El-Habeche (LIB)
10	Mẫn Bá Xuân (VIE)
11	Mohammed Nawaf (QAT)
12	Abdullahbik Baikzada (AFG)
13	Ranbir Singh (IND)
