= Sanjay Kumar (wrestler, born 1983) =

Indian wrestler

Sanjay Kumar is an Indian wrestler. Date of birth: 1983-12-31 Height: 172 cm Weight: 84 kg Club: Army Sportsclub Delhi Coach: Hargobind Singh, 1997 Profession: he is serving in the army At the 2010 Commonwealth Games, he won a gold in the Men's Greco-Roman 74 kg wrestling.
