= Imil Sharafetdinov =

Russian Greco-Roman wrestler (born 1987)

Imil Irfanovich Sharafetdinov Имиль Ирфан улы Шәрәфетдинов Имиль Шарафетдинов Ирфанович
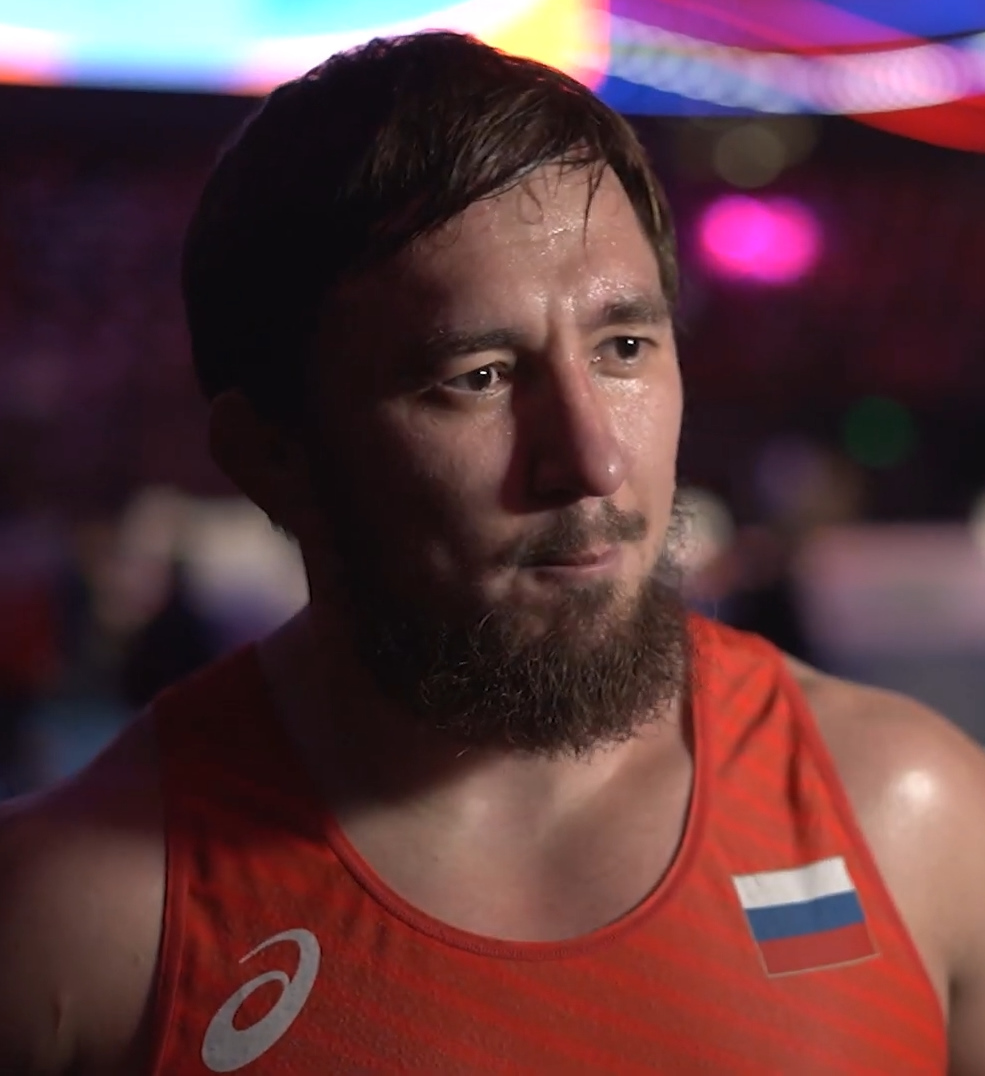
- Sharafetdinov in 2020

Personal information
- Full name: Imil Irfanovich Sharafetdinov
- National team: Russia
- Born: November 2, 1987 (age 38) Moscow, Russia
- Weight: 85 kg (187 lb); 80 kg (176 lb); 75 kg (165 lb)

Sport
- Sport: Wrestling
- Event: Greco-Roman
- Club: Sparta; Olympic village-80
- Coached by: Vitaly Reznik, Valery Kapaev
Medal record
Men's Greco-Roman wrestling
Representing Russia
World Championships
Bronze medal – third place	2010 Moscow	74 kg
World Military Championship
Gold medal – first place	2018 Moscow	82 kg
World Cup
Silver medal – second place	2016 Shiraz	85 kg
Golden Grand Prix Ivan Poddubny
Silver medal – second place	2009 Ryazan	74 kg
Bronze medal – third place	2010 Tyumen	74 kg
Memorial Heydar Aliyev
Bronze medal – third place	2012 Baku	74 kg
Grand Prix Hungary
Gold medal – first place	2010 Budapest	74 kg

Imil Irfanovich Sharafetdinov (Tatar: Имиль Ирфан улы Шәрәфетдинов; born November 2, 1987) is a Russian former Greco-Roman wrestler of Tatar descent. He is Greco-Roman bronze medalist in 2010 Wrestling World Championships 2010, twice medalist in Russian Greco-Roman nationals, international master of sports in Greco-Roman wrestling, silver medalist in World Cup 2016. World Military Champion 2018 in the 82 kilos.

He is a three-time Russian national champion (2010, 2012, 2018).
