= Yasha Manasherov =

Israeli Greco-Roman wrestler

Yasha Manasherov יעקב מנשירוב
Personal information
- Full name: Yasha Manasherov
- Nationality: Israel
- Born: 29 October 1980 (age 45) Tbilisi, Georgian SSR; Soviet Union
- Height: 1.73 m (5 ft 8 in)
- Weight: 74 kg (163 lb)

Sport
- Style: Greco-Roman
- Club: Hapoel Rehovot
- Coach: Leva Zimkin (1994–2005)

Yasha Manasherov (Hebrew: יעקב מנשירוב; born October 29, 1980, in Tbilisi, Georgian SSR) is a retired amateur Israeli Greco-Roman wrestler, who competed in the men's middleweight category. Manasherov finished eighth in the 74-kg division at the 2003 World Wrestling Championships in Créteil, France, and later represented his nation Israel at the 2004 Summer Olympics. He also trained as a member of the wrestling team for Hapoel Rehovot Sports Club under his personal coach Leva Zimkin. Coming from one of the most prestigious wrestling families in the former Soviet Union, Manasherov competed along with his cousin, three-time Olympian, and 2003 world champion Gocha Tsitsiashvili in numerous global tournaments.

Manasherov qualified for the Israeli squad in the men's 74 kg class at the 2004 Summer Olympics in Athens, by receiving a berth and rounding out the top eight spots from the World Championships. Manasherov suffered through a vulnerable game plan, as he lost his opening match 8–0 to Kazakhstan's Danil Khalimov, and was haplessly pinned by Spain's José Alberto Recuero in his second bout within a span of two minutes. Finishing last in the prelim pool and nineteenth overall in the final standings, Manasherov failed to advance further into the quarterfinals.
