= Reto Bucher =

Swiss Greco-Roman wrestler

Personal information
- Full name: Reto Bucher
- Nationality: Switzerland
- Born: 30 September 1982 (age 43) Mühlau, Aargau, Switzerland
- Height: 1.80 m (5 ft 11 in)
- Weight: 74 kg (163 lb)

Sport
- Style: Greco-Roman
- Club: Ringerstaffel Freiamt
- Coach: Leonz Küng (1997–2003); Andrey Maltsev (2003–2009)
Medal record
Men's Greco-Roman wrestling
Representing Switzerland
European Championships
Silver medal – second place	2007 Varna	74 kg

Reto Bucher (born September 30, 1982 in Mühlau, Aargau) is a retired amateur Swiss Greco-Roman wrestler, who competed in the men's middleweight category. He finished fourth in the 74-kg division at the 2004 Summer Olympics, and later took home a silver medal at the 2007 European Championships in Varna, Bulgaria. Before his wrestling career ended in 2009, Bucher trained as a member of the wrestling team for Ringerstaffel Freiamt in Aristau, under his personal coach Leonz Küng.

A member of the Swiss wrestling squad, Bucher entered the 2004 Summer Olympics in Athens as an underdog in the men's 74 kg class, after placing third and receiving a berth from the final Olympic Qualification Tournament in Tashkent, Uzbekistan. He opened his match by dominating Belarusian wrestler Aliaksandr Kikiniou with a 3–2 verdict, and then rallied for a 6–2 score over China's Sai Yinjiya in the prelim pool to move into the next round. Bucher edged past his Kazakh rival Danil Khalimov in the quarterfinals, before being tamed by eventual silver medalist Marko Yli-Hannuksela of Finland at 3–0, leaving him with an ankle injury. Fighting against Russia's Varteres Samurgashev for the bronze medal, Bucher could not endure a pain from his injury and easily lost the match to the Russian due to a 10–0 superiority limit.

Bucher lost again to Yli-Hannuksela for the bronze medal in the same division at the 2005 World Wrestling Championships in Budapest, Hungary, until his medal drought culminated with a silver at the European Championships in 2007. He also sought to compete for his second Swiss team at the 2008 Summer Olympics in Beijing, but missed out a spot from the Olympic trials. In 2009, Bucher announced his official retirement from the sport because of a right knee injury sustained from the Swiss championships.
