= Radosław Truszkowski =

Polish Greco-Roman wrestler (born 1978)

Personal information
- Full name: Radosław Truszkowski
- Nationality: Poland
- Born: 5 October 1978 (age 47) Olsztyn, Poland
- Height: 1.75 m (5 ft 9 in)
- Weight: 74 kg (163 lb)

Sport
- Style: Greco-Roman
- Club: Cement Gryf
- Coach: Andrzej Głąb
Medal record
Men's Greco-Roman wrestling
Representing Poland
Summer Universiade
Silver medal – second place	2005 İzmir	74 kg

Radosław Truszkowski (born 5 October 1978) is a Polish retired amateur Greco-Roman wrestler, who competed in the men's middleweight category. Truszkowski represented his nation Poland at the 2004 Summer Olympics, and later captured a silver medal in the 74-kg division at the 2005 Summer Universiade in İzmir, Turkey. Throughout his sporting career, Truszkowski trained full-time for Cement Gryf Wrestling Club in Chełm, under his personal coach and 1988 Olympic silver medalist Andrzej Głąb.

Truszkowski qualified for the Polish squad in the men's 74 kg class at the 2004 Summer Olympics in Athens. Earlier in the process, he placed fifth from the Olympic Qualification Tournament in Novi Sad (at that time in Serbia and Montenegro) to guarantee a spot on Poland's Olympic wrestling team. Truszkowski lost two straight matches to reigning Olympic champion Filiberto Azcuy of Cuba (0–6), and South Korea's Choi Duk-hoon (1–6), leaving him on the bottom of the pool and placing eighteenth in the final standings.

At the 2005 Summer Universiade in İzmir, Turkey, Truszkowski picked up a silver medal in the 74-kg division, losing the final match to the host nation's Şeref Tüfenk in front of the home audience.
