= Mohammad Babulfath =

Swedish Olympic wrestler

Personal information
- Full name: Mohammad Reza Babulfath
- Nationality: Sweden
- Born: 17 November 1978 (age 47) Tehran, Iran
- Height: 1.74 m (5 ft 8 1/2 in)
- Weight: 74 kg (163 lb)

Sport
- Style: Greco-Roman
- Club: Spårvägen
- Coach: Ryszard Swierad

Mohammad Reza Babulfath (born 17 November 1978, in Tehran, Iran) is a Swedish retired amateur Greco-Roman wrestler, who competed in the men's middleweight category. Babulfath obtained a fourth position in the 74-kg division at the 2003 European Championships in Riga, Latvia, and also represented his naturalized homeland Sweden at the 2004 Summer Olympics. Before his sporting career ended in 2008, Babulfath trained for Spårvägen in Stockholm, under Polish-born personal coach Ryszard Swierad.

Babulfath qualified for his naturalized Swedish squad in the men's 74 kg class at the 2004 Summer Olympics in Athens. Earlier in the process, he placed third from the Olympic Qualification Tournament in Novi Sad, Serbia and Montenegro to guarantee a spot on Sweden's Olympic wrestling team. He lost his opening match 4–0 to Germany's Konstantin Schneider and endured a daunting 9–0 defeat from eventual Olympic bronze medalist Varteres Samurgashev of Russia, that left him severely injured and unable to compete against Ukraine's Volodymyr Shatskykh on his final bout of the prelim pool. Placing him at the bottom of the pool and last out of 20 wrestlers in the final standings, Babulfath failed to advance to the quarterfinals.

Babulfath also sought to compete on his second bid for the 2008 Summer Olympics, but missed a spot from the Olympic Qualification Tournament and suddenly retired from his sporting career. Currently, he serves as an assistant coach for IK Sparta in Stockholm and trains for numerous Swedish wrestlers, including fellow Olympian Ara Abrahamian.
