= Bekkhan Ozdoev =

Russian Greco-Roman wrestler (born 1993)

Bekkhan Ozdoev Бекхан Оздоев
Personal information
- Full name: Bekkhan Abdurakhmanovich Ozdoev
- Born: 15 May 1993 (age 33) Ingushetia, Russia
- Height: 1.8 m (5 ft 11 in)
- Weight: 87 kg (192 lb)

Sport
- Country: Russia
- Sport: Wrestling
- Event: Greco-Roman
- Coached by: S. Novakovsky, Y. Yusofov, Y, P. Voronin
Medal record
Men's Greco-Roman wrestling
Representing Russia
European Championships
Silver medal – second place	2018 Kaspiysk	87 kg
Russian Championships
Gold medal – first place	2018 Odintsovo	87 kg
Bronze medal – third place	2015 Saint Petersburg	85 kg
Gold medal – first place	2014 Ramenskoye	80 kg
Ivan Poddubny Memorial
Gold medal – first place	2018 Krasnodar	87 kg
Golden Grand Prix Ivan Poddubny
Gold medal – first place	2018 Krasnodar	87 kg
Silver medal – second place	2016 Tyumen	85 kg
Gold medal – first place	2014 Tyumen	80 kg

Bekkhan Abdurakhmanovich Ozdoev (Russian: Бекхан Абдрахманович Оздоев; born 15 May 1993 in Ingushetia) is a Russian Greco-Roman wrestler of Ingush descent who wrestles in the 87 kg weight category.

== Early life ==
Ozdoev began wrestling for its courage, beauty and unexpected impressiveness. He decided to start training in Greco-Roman wrestling as his elder brother Khamzat and his neighbors were also engaged in the sport. Ozdoev began wrestling under Askhab Belkharoev in the small village of Galashki, Ingushetia. After several years, Ozdoev decided to move to Rostov-on-Don to continue with education and to train wrestling, becoming there a successful wrestler at cadet and junior level.

== 2018: European silver medalist, Russian champion ==
Ozdoev competed at the 2018 European Wrestling Championships in Kaspiysk, Dagestan. Ozdoev faced Matuzevičius of Lithuania in the Round of 32, and won by 11-2 technical fall, then faced former two-time European Championships bronze medalist Artur Shahinyan of Armenia, Ozdoev beat Shahinyan by 9–1, resulting in another technical fall. Ozdoev then faced World silver medalist Denis Kudla of Germany and won by fall. In the semi-finals, Ozdoev beat Islam Abbasov by a 4–3 score. In the final match, Ozdoev faced Georgian wrestler, Robert Kobliashvili, but lost by a score of 3–2, ultimately winning the silver medal.

Ozdoev won gold at the 2018 Russian National Championships, defeating three former-Olympic gold championships in the process. Ozdoev first defeated Aleksey Mishin, an Olympic champion from the 2004 Summer Olympics, then defeated 2012 Olympic champion, Alan Khugayev. In the final match, Ozdoev defeated reigning 2016 Olympic champion Davit Chakvetadze by 10-0 technical fall, thus making Ozdoev a two-time Russian national champion and securing Ozdoev's place to wrestle at the 2018 World Wrestling Championships held in Budapest, Hungary.
