= Aliaksandr Kikiniou =

Belarusian Greco-Roman wrestler

Personal information
- Full name: Aliaksandr Fiodaravich Kikiniou
- Nationality: Belarus; United States
- Born: 9 April 1980 (age 46) Homelskay oblast, Zhlobin District, Belarusian SSR, Soviet Union
- Height: 1.77 m (5 ft 9 1/2 in)
- Weight: 74 kg (163 lb)

Sport
- Style: Greco-Roman
- Club: Dynamo Minsk
- Coach: Siarhei Lishtvan
Medal record
Men's Greco-Roman wrestling
Representing Belarus
World Championships
Bronze medal – third place	2009 Herning	74 kg
European Championships
Gold medal – first place	2010 Baku	74 kg
Silver medal – second place	2003 Belgrade	74 kg
Bronze medal – third place	2009 Vilnius	74 kg

Aliaksandr Fiodaravich Kikiniov (Belarusian: Аляксандр Фёдаравіч Кікінёў; born 9 April 1980) is a Belarusian-American Greco-Roman wrestler. He won the bronze medal at the 2009 World Wrestling Championships in Herning, Denmark, defeating Germany's Konstantin Schneider. He is also a three-time medalist and one-time champion at the European Championships.

Kikiniou made his official debut at the 2004 Summer Olympics in Athens, where he competed in the men's 74 kg class. He lost two straight matches each to China's Sai Yinjiya (3–5) and Switzerland's Reto Bucher by a 2–3 score, leaving him on the bottom of the pool and placing fifteenth in the final standings.

At the 2012 Summer Olympics in London, Kikiniou made an Olympic comeback from his eight-year absence, again in the 74 kg class. He reached the quarter-final round of the event, where he was outclassed by Armenia's Arsen Julfalakyan, who was able to score three technical points in two successive periods. Because Julfalakyan advanced further into the final match against Russia's Roman Vlasov, Kikiniou was offered another shot for an Olympic bronze medal through the repechage bouts. He first defeated Kyrgyzstan's Daniar Kobonov, but lost the bronze medal match to Azerbaijan's Emin Ahmadov, who formidably pushed him out of the wrestling mat in the third period, with a 2–3 decision.

In 2024, he qualified for his seventh Greco-Roman World Championships, representing the United States for the first time at the age of 44, in the 82 kg class.
