= Vugar Aslanov (wrestler) =

Azerbaijani Greco-Roman wrestler

Personal information
- Nationality: Azerbaijani
- Born: 20 March 1976 (age 50) Baku, Azerbaijan

Sport
- Sport: Wrestling

Vugar Aslanov (born 20 March 1976) is an Azerbaijani wrestler. He competed in the men's Greco-Roman 74 kg at the 2004 Summer Olympics.
