= Choi Duk-hoon =

South Korean Greco-Roman wrestler

Personal information
- Full name: Choi Duk-hoon
- Nationality: South Korea
- Born: 5 March 1976 (age 50) Seoul, South Korea
- Height: 1.76 m (5 ft 9 1/2 in)
- Weight: 74 kg (163 lb)

Sport
- Style: Greco-Roman
- Club: Sung Shin
- Coach: Bang Dae-du
Medal record
Men's Greco-Roman wrestling
Representing South Korea
Asian Championships
Gold medal – first place	2003 Delhi	74 kg
Bronze medal – third place	2004 Almaty	74 kg
Bronze medal – third place	2005 Wuhan	74 kg

Choi Duk-hoon (also Choi Deok-hun, Korean: 최덕훈; born March 5, 1976) is a retired amateur South Korean Greco-Roman wrestler, who competed in the men's middleweight category. He produced a remarkable tally of three career medals, including a gold in the 74-kg division at the 2003 Asian Wrestling Championships in Delhi, India, and also finished tenth at the 2004 Summer Olympics, representing his nation South Korea. Having worked as a full-time employee for Sung Shin, Choi trained throughout his sporting career as a member of its wrestling team under head coach Bang Dae-du.

Choi was born in Seoul, South Korea. Choi highlighted his sporting career at the 2003 Asian Wrestling Championships in Delhi, India, where he captured a gold medal over India's Sanjay Kumar in the 74-kg division with a comfortable 7–0 decision.

At the 2004 Summer Olympics in Athens, Choi qualified for the South Korean squad, as a 28-year-old, in the men's 74 kg class. Earlier in the process, he placed third in the same class at the Asian Championships in Almaty, Kazakhstan to guarantee a spot on South Korea's Olympic wrestling team. He lost his opening match 2–6 to two-time reigning Olympic champion Filiberto Azcuy of Cuba, but bounced back to oust Poland's Radosław Truszkowski with a challenging 6–1 verdict. Placing second in the prelim pool and tenth overall, Choi failed to advance to the quarterfinals.
