= Hassan Shahsavan =

Australian wrestler

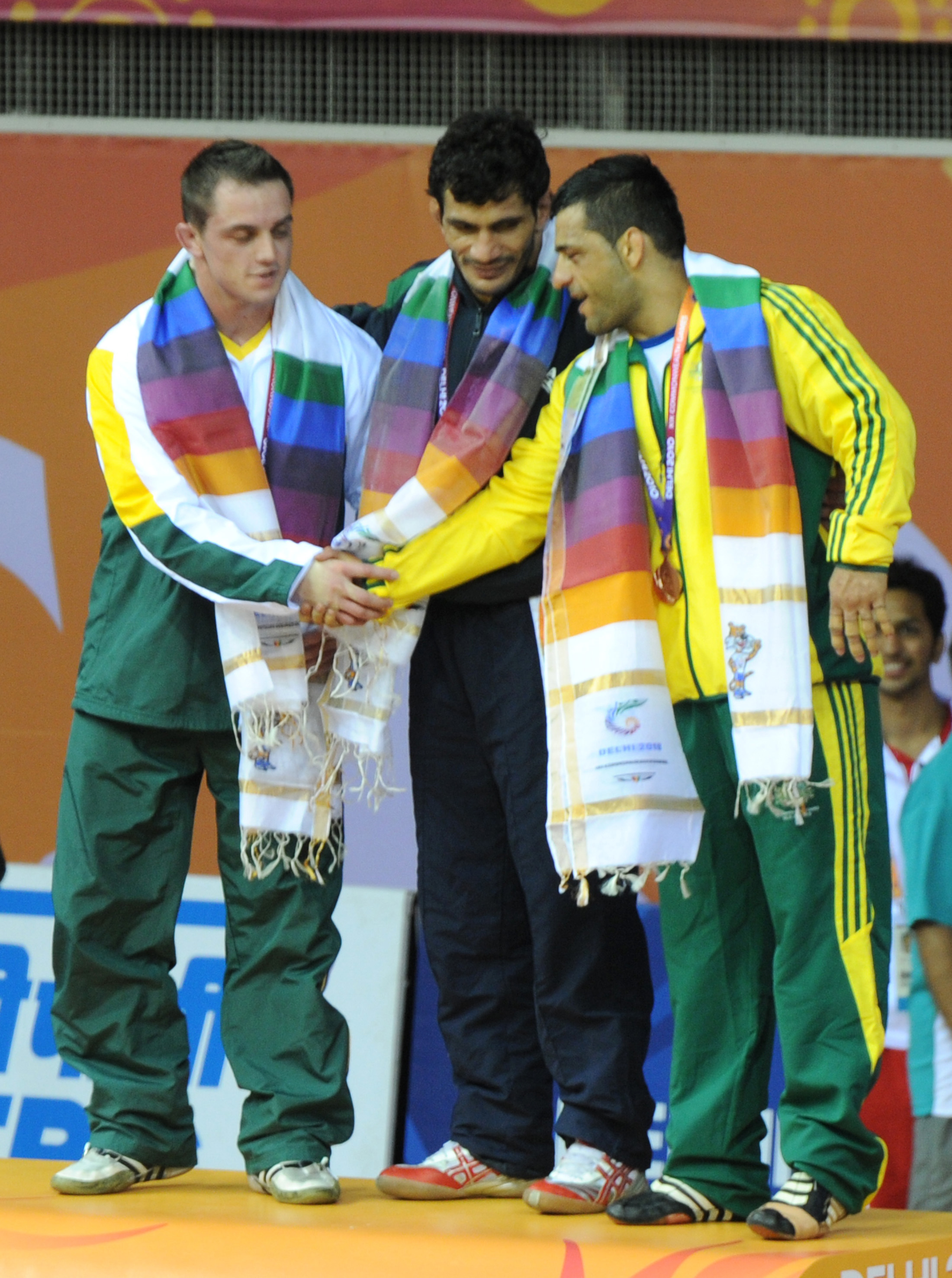
- 2010 Commonwealth Games-Delhi - Sanjay Kumar, Richard Brain and Hassan Shahsaval

Personal information
- Nationality: Australia
- Born: 30 December 1975 (age 50) Tehran, Imperial State of Iran
- Height: 1.70 m (5 ft 7 in)
- Weight: 74 kg (163 lb)

Sport
- Sport: Wrestling
- Event: Greco-Roman
- Club: Hornsby PCYC
Medal record
Men's Greco-Roman wrestling
Representing Australia
Commonwealth Games
Bronze medal – third place	2010 New Delhi	74 kg

Hassan Shahsavan (born 30 December 1975 in Tehran, Iran) is an amateur Iranian-born Australian Greco-Roman wrestler, who played for the men's middleweight category. He won a bronze medal for his division at the 2010 Commonwealth Games in New Delhi, India.

Shahsavan initially selected as a member of the Iranian wrestling team for the 2000 Summer Olympics in Sydney, but did not compete. He moved to Australia a year later, and eventually received a citizenship one week too late to qualify for the Australian team at the 2004 Summer Olympics in Athens.

Shahsavan represented his adopted nation Australia at the 2008 Summer Olympics in Beijing, where he competed for the men's 74 kg class. He received a bye for the preliminary round of sixteen, before losing out to Kazakhstan's Roman Melyoshin, with a three-set technical score (0–3, 2–1, 0–5), and a classification point score of 1–3.
