= Saiyinjiya =

Chinese Greco-Roman wrestler

Saiyinjiya (simplified Chinese: 赛音吉雅; traditional Chinese: 賽音吉雅; pinyin: Sàiyīnjíyǎ; born October 25, 1976, in Xilingol League, Inner Mongolia) is a Southern Mongol male Greco-Roman wrestler from China who competed at the 2004 Summer Olympics and finished eleventh in the 74 kg Greco-Roman competition. He also competed at the 2002 Asian Games in the men's Greco-Roman 74 kg event.
