= Aleksandr Kazakevič =

Lithuanian Greco-Roman wrestler (born 1986)

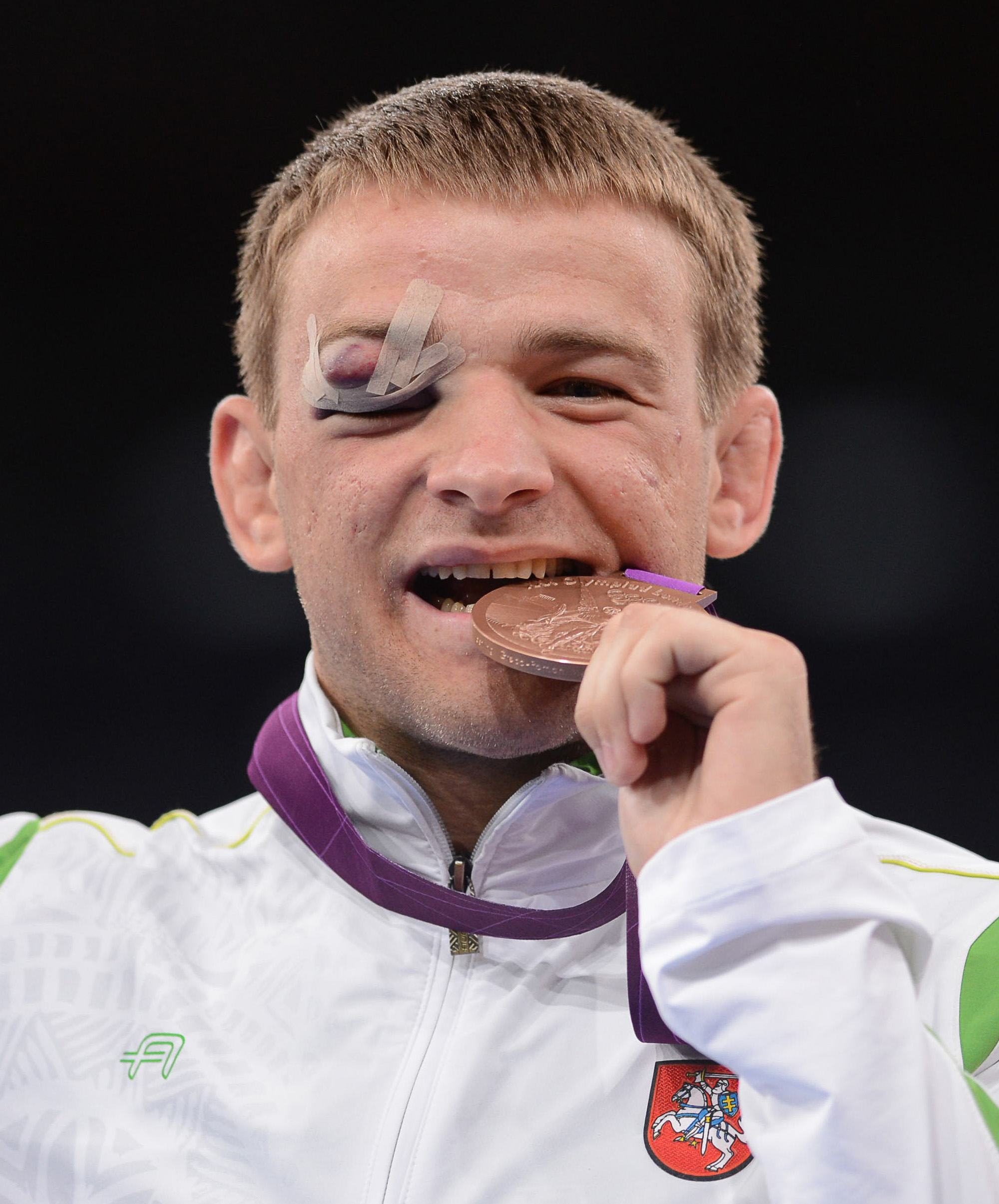
- Kazakevič with bronze medal, 2012

Personal information
- Born: 12 June 1986 (age 40) Vilnius, Lithuanian SSR, Soviet Union
Medal record
Men's Greco-Roman wrestling
Representing Lithuania
Olympic Games
Bronze medal – third place	2012 London	74 kg
European Championships
Bronze medal – third place	2012 Belgrade	74 kg
World Junior Championships
Bronze medal – third place	2005 Vilnius	Greco-Roman
European Junior Championships
Silver medal – second place	2005	Greco-Roman
European Cadet Championships
Gold medal – first place	2003 Rostov	Greco-Roman

Aleksandr Kazakevič (born 12 June 1986 in Vilnius) is a Lithuanian Greco-Roman wrestler.

He participated in 2008 Summer Olympics and 2012 Summer Olympics.

At the 2008 Summer Olympics, he competed at welterweight (66 kg). He lost to Mikhail Siamionau in his first match.

At the 2012 Summer Olympics, he moved up in weight class to middleweight (74 kg). He beat Peter Bacsi in his first match and Robert Rosengren in the quarterfinal before losing to Roman Vlasov in the semi-final. Because the person who beat him reached the final he was entered into the bronze medal repechage. In the repechage he beat Mark Madsen to win his bronze medal.

In 2014 Kazakevič was one of the contestants in Lithuanian version of reality show Celebrity Splash! called Šuolis!.

In 2017 he married Greta Lebedeva. 2018 was born his first child Eldar. In 2021 was born his daughter Elara.
