= Movses Karapetyan =

Armenian Greco-Roman wrestler

Personal information
- Born: 2 January 1987 (age 39) Yerevan, Armenia
- Height: 1.70 m (5 ft 7 in)
- Weight: 73 kg (161 lb)

Sport
- Sport: Wrestling
- Event: Greco-Roman
- Coached by: Eduard Sahakyan
Medal record
Men's Greco-Roman wrestling
Representing Armenia
European Championships
Bronze medal – third place	2000 Moscow	69 kg
Bronze medal – third place	2001 Istanbul	69 kg
Gold medal – first place	2005 Varna	74 kg

Movses Karapetyan (Armenian: Մովսես Կարապետյան, born 2 January 1987) is a retired Armenian Greco Roman wrestler.

Karapetyan won a gold medal at the 2005 European Wrestling Championships. He also won bronze in 2000 and 2001.
