= T. C. Dantzler =

American Greco-Roman wrestler (born 1970)

T. C. Dantzler OLY
Personal information
- Full name: Thomas Curtis Dantzler
- Born: October 26, 1970 (age 55) Harvey, Illinois, U.S.
- Height: 5 ft 11 in (180 cm)

Sport
- Sport: Wrestling
- Weight class: 74 kg (163 lb)
- Event: Greco-Roman
- College team: Northern Illinois
- Club: Gator Wrestling Club
- Team: USA
- Coached by: Steve Fraser
Medal record
Men's Greco-Roman wrestling
Representing the United States
Pan American Games
Bronze medal – third place	2003 Santo Domingo	74 kg
Bronze medal – third place	2007 Rio de Janeiro	74 kg
Pan American Championships
Silver medal – second place	2007 San Salvador	74 kg
Silver medal – second place	2008 Colorado Springs	74 kg

Thomas Curtis "T. C." Dantzler (born October 26, 1970) is an American former Greco-Roman wrestler, who competed for the men's 74-kg category at the 2008 Summer Olympics in Beijing. He is a two-time U.S. national champion, five-time U.S. world wrestling team member, and two-time bronze medalist at the Pan American Games. Dantzler was also a member of the 2007 U.S. Greco-Roman World Champion Team.

== Early life and education ==
Dantzler, a native of Harvey, Illinois, attended Bremen High School, where he was a runner-up at the Illinois state wrestling tournament. He also earned letters in football, baseball, and track and field. After graduating from high school, Danzler attended Northern Illinois University in DeKalb, Illinois, where he received a bachelor's degree in economics, and was a four-time qualifier at the NCAA wrestling tournament (1990–1993).

== Wrestling career ==
Although he never won a state tournament title in wrestling during his high school years, or national title in wrestling during his collegiate career, Dantzler was a regular member of the U.S. national Greco-Roman wrestling team. In 1995, he moved from Illinois to Colorado Springs, Colorado, to work and train as a resident athlete at the U.S. Olympic Training Center. At the 2006 World Championships in Guangzhou, China, he had his best finish at the World Championships, placing fifth.

Having achieved his best finish at the World Championships, Dantzler qualified for the 2007 Pan American Games in Rio de Janeiro, Brazil, and competed for the 74-kg category in men's Greco-Roman wrestling. He lost in the first preliminary round to Cuba's Odelis Herrero, who eventually won the gold medal in this category, but managed to bounce back into the repechage bouts to repeat his bronze winning streak from the 2003 Pan American Games in Santo Domingo. In 2007, he was a part of the United States Greco-Roman Wrestling Team that finished first at the World Championships.

He knocked off his former opponent Herrero at the 2008 Pan American Wrestling Championships in Colorado Springs, but ended up with a silver medal, after losing out to Peru's Sixto Barrera in the final match. Dantzler received an elusive qualifying berth at the 2008 Summer Olympics in Beijing, China, after winning the U.S. Olympic trials for his respective weight class.

== Olympic Games ==
At age thirty-seven, Dantzler became the second-oldest U.S. wrestler to compete at the Olympics, with a difference of one month from Chris Campbell, who previously won the bronze medal in men's freestyle wrestling at the 1992 Summer Olympics in Barcelona. He made his debut at the 2008 Summer Olympics in Beijing, and qualified for the men's 74-kg class in Greco-Roman wrestling. Despite his age and first-time participation, Dantzler lost in the first preliminary round of the competition, after being defeated by Hungary's Péter Bácsi, with a three-set score (1–5, 2–2, 0–3), and a classification point score of 1–3. After losing his match in the first round, Dantzler later admitted that he was slowly reacting, because he had to speed up reducing weight due to faulty scale.

== Post-wrestling career ==
After the Olympics, Dantzler retired from his sporting career, and worked as a founder, president, and CEO of a software development company which specialized in employment or volunteer background checks for its business clients.
