= Aleksandr Dokturishvili =

Georgian-Uzbekistani wrestler (born 1980)

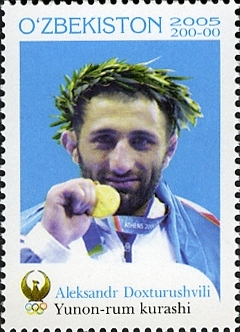

Personal information
- Born: 22 May 1980 (age 46) Gardabani, Georgia
- Height: 1.69 m (5 ft 7 in)

Sport
- Sport: Wrestling
- Event: Greco-Roman
- Club: Trade Union Sports Club, Tashkent
Medal record
Men's Greco-Roman wrestling
Representing Uzbekistan
Olympic Games
Gold medal – first place	2004 Athens	74 kg
Asian Wrestling Championships
Gold medal – first place	2004 Almaty	74 kg
Representing Georgia
European Championships
Gold medal – first place	2001 Istanbul	69 kg

Aleksandr Dokturishivili (Georgian: ალექსანდრე დოხტურიშვილი, Russian: Александр Доктуришвили; born 22 May 1980) is a Georgian-Uzbek wrestler. In 2004, he won gold medals in the Greco-Roman −74 kg division at the Summer Olympics and Asian Championships.
