= José Alberto Recuero =

Spanish Greco-Roman wrestler

Personal information
- Full name: José Alberto Recuero García
- Nationality: Spain
- Born: 3 May 1974 (age 52) Barcelona, Spain
- Height: 1.74 m (5 ft 8 1/2 in)
- Weight: 74 kg (163 lb)

Sport
- Style: Greco-Roman
- Club: Club Lucha Baron Viver
- Coach: Bernardo Martínez
Medal record
Men's Greco-Roman wrestling
Representing Spain
Mediterranean Games
Bronze medal – third place	2005 Almería	74 kg

José Alberto Recuero García (Note: In this Spanish name, the first or paternal surname is Recuero and the second or maternal family name is García.) (born 3 May 1974 in Barcelona) is a retired amateur Spanish Greco-Roman wrestler, who competed in the men's middleweight category. He represented his nation Spain in two editions of the Olympic Games (1992 and 2004), and later capped his sporting career with a bronze medal in the 74-kg division at the 2005 Mediterranean Games in Almería. Before his retirement from wrestling in 2006, Recuero trained full-time for Baron Viver Wrestling Club (Spanish: Club Lucha Baron Viver) in his native Barcelona under his coach Bernardo Martínez.

Recuero made his official debut, as an 18-year-old teen and a member of the host nation's wrestling team, at the 1992 Summer Olympics in Barcelona, where he competed in the men's welterweight category (74 kg). In the prelim pool, Recuero received a bye on the opening round, before losing out two straight matches each to Austria's Anton Marchl (3–1) and Yugoslavia's Željko Trajković (3–0).

Twelve years after his last Olympics, Recuero qualified for his second Spanish squad, as a 30-year-old veteran, in the men's 74 kg class at the 2004 Summer Olympics in Athens. Earlier in the process, he finished fourth at the Olympic Qualification Tournament in Tashkent, Uzbekistan to guarantee his spot on the returning Spanish wrestling team after a 12-year hiatus. He lost his opening match 2–3 in overtime to Kazakhstan's Danil Khalimov, but bounced back to pin Georgian-born Israeli wrestler Yasha Manasherov within a three-minute span to close the prelim pool. Finishing second in the pool and ninth overall, Recuero's performance fell short to put him further into the quarterfinals.

When Spain hosted the 2005 Mediterranean Games in Almería, Sanchez ended his career medal drought by picking up a bronze medal in the 74-kg division, much to the delight of the home crowd inside Huércal de Almería Sports Hall.
