= Christophe Guénot =

French Greco-Roman wrestler

Personal information
- Born: 7 January 1979 (age 47) Saint-Rémy, Saône-et-Loire, France
Medal record
Men's Greco-Roman wrestling
Representing France
Olympic Games
Bronze medal – third place	2008 Beijing	74 kg
Mediterranean Games
Silver medal – second place	2009 Pescara	74 kg
Bronze medal – third place	2005 Almería	74 kg

Christophe Guénot (French: [kʁistɔf ɡeno]; born 7 January 1979 in Saint-Rémy, Saône-et-Loire) is a French wrestler who won the Bronze medal in the Men's Greco-Roman 74kg in the 2008 Summer Olympics in Beijing. He also competed at the 2012 Summer Olympics.

He is brother of the Olympic Champion Steeve Guenot.
