= Konstantin Schneider =

German Greco-Roman wrestler

Personal information
- Nationality: Germany
- Born: 17 February 1975 (age 51) Frunze, Kirgiz SSR, Soviet Union
- Height: 1.78 m (5 ft 10 in)
- Weight: 74 kg (163 lb)

Sport
- Sport: Wrestling
- Event: Greco-Roman
- Club: KSV Köllerbach (GER)
- Coached by: Heinrich Schneider
Medal record
Men's Greco-Roman wrestling
Representing Germany
World Championships
Silver medal – second place	2003 Créteil	74 kg
Bronze medal – third place	2005 Budapest	74 kg

Konstantin Schneider (born 17 February 1975 in Frunze, Kirgiz SSR, Soviet Union) is an amateur German Greco-Roman wrestler, who played for the men's middleweight category. He won a silver medal for his division at the 2003 World Wrestling Championships in Créteil, France, and bronze at the 2005 World Wrestling Championships in Budapest, Hungary. Schneider is also a member of the wrestling team for KSV Köllerbach in Püttlingen, and is coached and trained by his father Heinrich Schneider.

Schneider made his official debut for the 2004 Summer Olympics in Athens, where he placed second in the preliminary pool of the men's 74 kg class, against Russia's Varteres Samurgashev, Ukraine's Volodymyr Shatskykh, and Sweden's Mohammad Babulfath.

At the 2008 Summer Olympics in Beijing, Schneider competed for the second time in the men's 74 kg class. He defeated Algeria's Messaoud Zeghdane in the preliminary round of sixteen, before losing out the quarterfinal match to Georgia's Manuchar Kvirkvelia, who was able to score eight points in two straight periods, leaving Schneider without a single point. Because his opponent advanced further into the final match, Schneider offered another shot for the bronze medal by entering the repechage rounds. Unfortunately, he was defeated in the first round by France's Christophe Guénot, with a two-set technical score (1–2, 1–2), and a classification point score of 1–3.
