= Varteres Samurgashev =

Armenian-Russian Greco-Roman wrestler (born 1979)

Personal information
- Born: 13 September 1979 (age 46) Rostov-on-Don, Russian SFSR, Soviet Union
- Height: 1.72 m (5 ft 8 in)
- Weight: 74 kg (163 lb)

Sport
- Sport: Wrestling
- Event: Greco-Roman
- Club: SKA Rostov
- Coached by: Suren Kazarian
Medal record
Men's Greco-Roman wrestling
Representing Russia
Olympic Games
Gold medal – first place	2000 Sydney	63 kg
Bronze medal – third place	2004 Athens	74 kg
World Championships
Gold medal – first place	2002 Moscow	74 kg
Gold medal – first place	2005 Budapest	74 kg
European Championships
Gold medal – first place	2000 Moscow	63 kg
Silver medal – second place	2002 Seinaejoki	74 kg
Gold medal – first place	2006 Moscow	74 kg
World Cup
Silver medal – second place	2005 Tehran	74 kg
Silver medal – second place	2006 Budapest	74 kg

Varteres Varteresovich Samurgashev (Armenian: Վարդերես Սամուրղաշև, Russian: Вартерес Вартересович Самургашев; born 13 September 1979) is an Armenian-Russian Greco-Roman wrestler. He is a two-time European, two-time World and Olympic Champion. Samurgashev was awarded the Honoured Master of Sports of Russia title. He is a lawyer by profession, the President of the Wrestling Federation in the Rostov region, and vice-president of the Russian Wrestling Federation. Samurgashev is an honorary citizen of Russia and Armenia.

== Career ==
Samurgashev was born on 13 September 1979 in Rostov-on-Don in an Armenian family. His family had a sports background, his mother was part of the Rostov handball team that won the Russian national championships. He started practicing Greco-Roman wrestling at the age of 7 under the tutelage of Suren Kazarian, along with his three older brothers Rafael, Albert, and Simon. By the end of the 1990s, he was a member of the junior national team of Russia, and became the Junior European Champion in 1998 and the Junior World Champion in 1999. In 1998, he won his first of six senior Russian Championships and began to be compete for the Russian national team.

After winning the 2000 European Wrestling Championships in Moscow, he competed at the 2000 Summer Olympics in Sydney. In the course of the Olympic tournament, Samurgashev defeated the current Olympic champion Włodzimierz Zawadzki (Poland), World and European champion Seref Eroglu (Turkey), World Cup winner Kevin Bracken (USA), and two-time European champion Akaki Chachua (Georgia). In the final, he defeated the current Olympic vice champion Juan Marén (Cuba) and won the Olympic gold medal at the age of 20.

He decided to move up a weight class after the Olympics. In 2002, in his new weight category, he won the silver medal at the 2002 European Championships and a gold medal at the 2002 World Wrestling Championships. At the 2004 Summer Olympics in Athens, he won three fights against opponents from Sweden, Ukraine, and Germany, but in the semifinals suddenly lost to a relatively less well-known opponent from Uzbekistan. Winning the match for third place against a Switzerland opponent, he won a bronze medal, but in the future called this result the most offensive failure in his athletic career, and explained it resulted from underestimating his opponent and premature mental orientation towards the final match.

The following year, Samurgashev remained one of the top wrestlers in his division and became captain of Russia's national Greco-Roman wrestling team. He won his second World Championship gold medal at the 2005 World Wrestling Championships in Budapest and, the following year after that, won his second European Championship gold medal at the 2006 European Wrestling Championships in Moscow. At the 2008 Summer Olympics in Beijing, he won his first two bouts against competitors from Denmark and Azerbaijan, but lost in the quarterfinals of the Hungarian Péter Bácsi. This match has been the subject of controversy thorough hearings, as the referee made the decision to award three points to Samurgashev, but after the intervention of the vice-president of FILA Mario Saletniga the decision was cancelled. The Russian side challenged the actions Saletniga were a violation of regulations. In 2009, Samurgashev won the Sports Arbitration Court case in Lausanne which found the handling incompetent, but had not revised the result.

Samurgashev planned to fully carry out and the next Olympics, but in June 2009 at the Russian Championships in Krasnodar, while executing an overrun he received a double fracture of the jaw with displacement and was hospitalized in intensive care. Later he was able to recover from this injury, but he was unable to compete at his previous level. In September 2012, he officially announced the completion of his sports career.

== After wrestling ==
In September 2012, Varteres Samurgashev headed the Wrestling Federation of Rostov. In September 2013 he was elected to the Legislative Assembly of the Rostov region. He became the vice-president of the Russian Wrestling Federation in November 2016.

== Personal life ==
Varteres has an older brother, Rafael Samurgashev (born 1963), who was a member of the Armenian national Greco-Roman wrestling team at the 2000 Summer Olympics and is now the vice president of the Russian Wrestling Federation. Varteres got married in 2009. He has three children: Albert (born 2009), twins Simon and Suren (born 2011), and Rafael (born 2014). He also has niece named Tatiana Samurgashev, who plays tennis at the IMG Academy in Bradenton, Florida.

He graduated from the Rostov State University of Economics in 2001 and Kuban State Academy of Physical Culture in 2005.

On 10 July 2004, a monument of Samurgashev was erected on the Rostov-on-Don square of Karl Marx in the Nakhichevan-on-Don district of the city. The statue was sculpted by David Begalov. An inscription reads, "Varteres Samurgashev — first Olympic champion of Don."

Samurgashev was awarded a gold medal of the Armenian Ministry of Sport in September 2012. On 27 December 2012, Samurgashev obtained Armenian citizenship and became a dual citizen by decree of President Serzh Sargsyan. Varteres stated receiving Armenian citizenship was one of his most memorable experiences. “I was born and raised in Rostov-on-Don, but I am Armenian, and that says it all,” he said.

In 2014, he was awarded the title of "Honorary Citizen of the city of Rostov-on-Don".
