= Marko Yli-Hannuksela =

Finnish sport wrestler (born 1973)

Medal record

Men's Greco-Roman wrestling

Representing Finland

Olympic Games
Silver medal – second place	2004 Athens	74 kg
Bronze medal – third place	2000 Sydney	76 kg

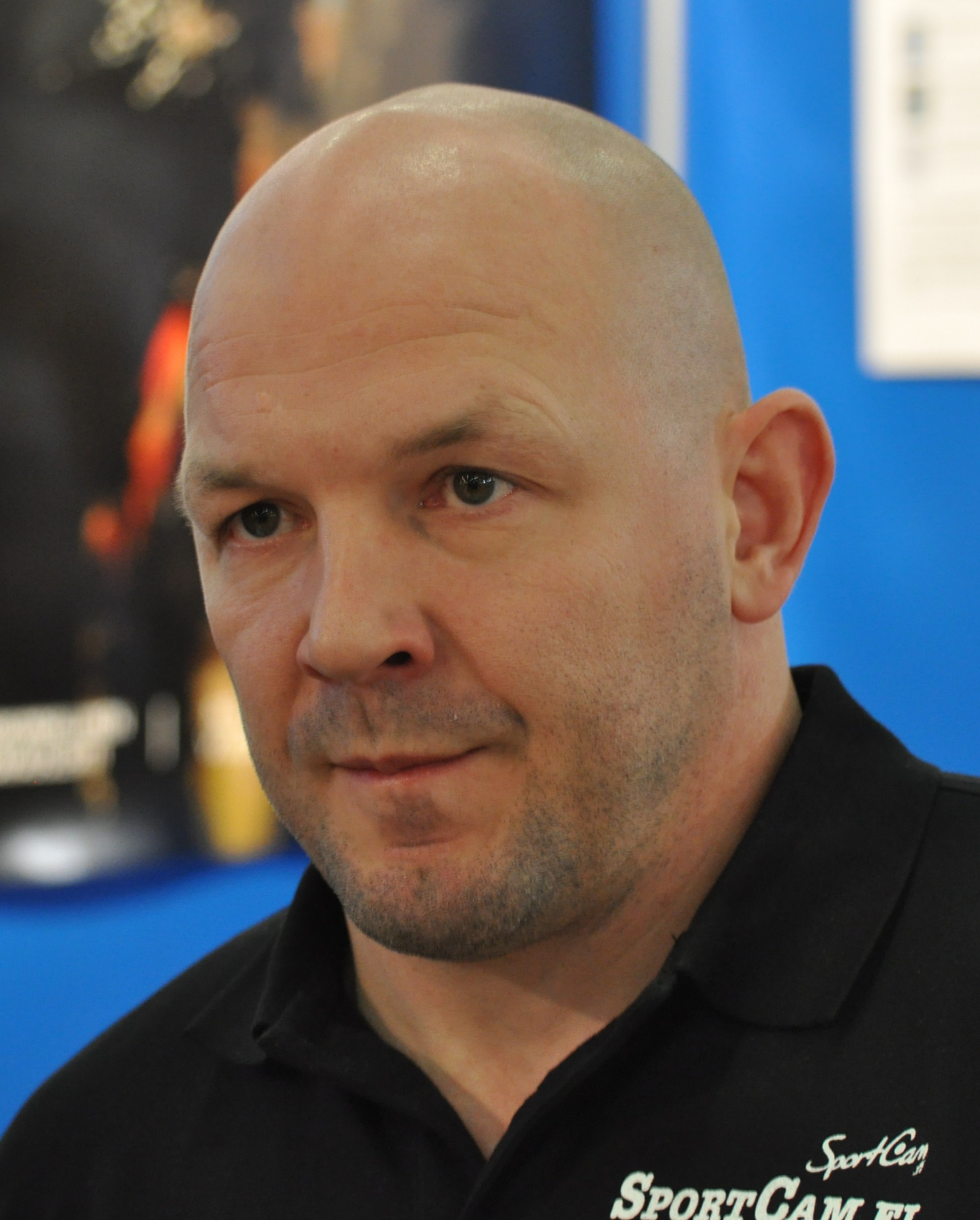
Finnish former wrestler Marko Yli-Hannuksela at Helsinki Book Fair, 2013.

Marko Juhani Yli-Hannuksela (born 21 December 1973 in Ilmajoki) is a Finnish former wrestler. His most notable accomplishments are his two Olympic medals and a world championship in Greco-Roman wrestling. After failing to qualify for 2008 Olympic Games, he decided to retire in August 2008.

His local sports team are the Ilmajoen Kisailijat, and he is coached by his father Seppo Yli-Hannuksela. He has five children with his wife Gita.

== Accomplishments ==
=== Olympic Games ===
- Athens 2004 - silver (74 kg weight class)
- Sydney 2000 - bronze (76 kg)
- Atlanta 1996 - 15. (68 kg)

=== World Championships ===
- 2006 - silver (74 kg)
- 2005 - bronze (74 kg)
- 2003 - 7. (74 kg)
- 2002 - 9. (74 kg)
- 2001 - 6. (76 kg)
- 1999 - 10. (76 kg)
- 1998 - 9. (76 kg)
- 1997 - gold (76 kg)
- 1995 - 8. (68 kg)
- 1994 - 6. (68 kg)

=== European Championships ===
- 2003 - 8. (74 kg)
- 2002 - bronze (74 kg)
- 2001 - 9. (76 kg)
- 2000 - 12. (76 kg)
- 1999 - 6. (76 kg)
- 1998 - 7. (76 kg)
- 1997 - 4. (69 kg)
- 1996 - 5. (68 kg)
- 1995 - bronze (68 kg)
- 1994 - 12. (68 kg)
