= Volodymyr Shatskykh =

Ukrainian wrestler (born 1981)

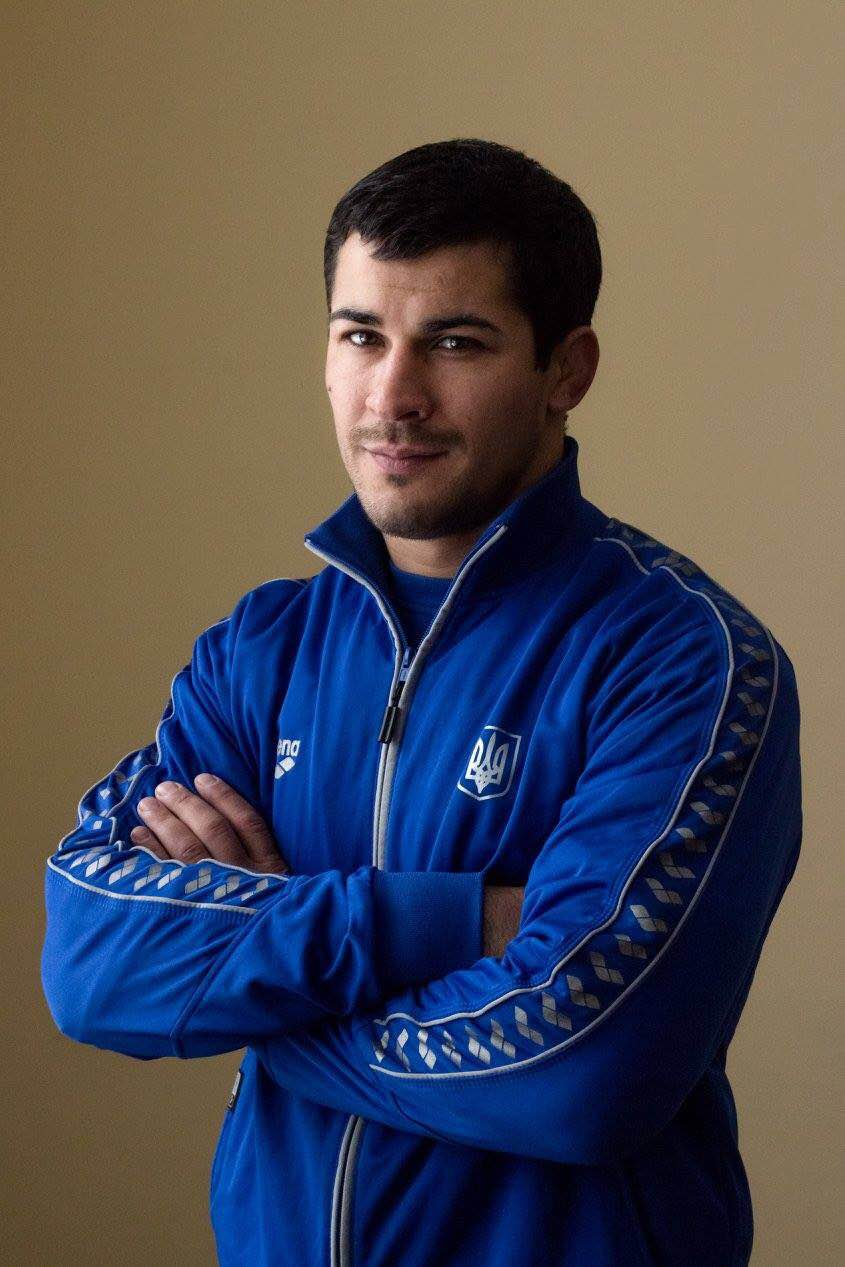
- Shatskykh in 2017

Medal record

Men's Greco-Roman wrestling

Representing Ukraine

World Championships
Gold medal – first place	2006 Guangzhou	74 kg

European Championships
Silver medal – second place	2009 Vilnius	74 kg

Volodymyr Volodymyrovych Shatskykh (born 2 July 1981) is a Ukrainian former Olympic Greco-Roman wrestler who represented his country at the 2004 and 2008 Summer Olympics. Born in Molodohvardiisk, he won his division at the 2006 World Championships.
