= Daniar Kobonov =

Kyrgyzstani wrestler (born 1982)

Medal record

Men's Greco-Roman wrestling

Representing Kyrgyzstan

World Championships
Bronze medal – third place	2010 Moscow	74 kg

Asian Games
Silver medal – second place	2002 Busan	66 kg
Bronze medal – third place	2006 Doha	74 kg
Gold medal – first place	2010 Guangzhou	74 kg

Asian Championships
Gold medal – first place	2005 Wuhan	74 kg
Gold medal – first place	2007 Bishkek	74 kg
Silver medal – second place	2006 Almaty	74 kg
Silver medal – second place	2008 Jeju City	74 kg

Daniar Kobonov (born September 8, 1982) is a male Greco-Roman wrestler from Kyrgyzstan. He has competed in two Olympic games, the 2004 Olympic Games and the 2012 Olympic Games.
