= 1998 World Wrestling Championships – Men's Greco-Roman 63 kg =

Men's Greco-Roman 63 kg at the 1998 World Championships
- Venue: Gavlerinken
- Dates: 27–29 August 1998
- Competitors: 29 from 29 nations

Medalists
gold medal	Mkhitar Manukyan	Kazakhstan
silver medal	Şeref Eroğlu	Turkey
bronze medal	Choi Sang-sun	South Korea

The men's Greco-Roman 63 kilograms is a competition featured at the 1998 World Wrestling Championships, and was held at the Gavlerinken in Gävle, Sweden from 27 to 29 August 1998.

== Results ==
=== Round 1 ===
	Score	
Round of 32
Ismo Kamesaki (FIN)	0–4	Kevin Bracken (USA)
Pavel Panish (BLR)	2–3	Leonard Frîncu (ROM)
Nikolay Monov (RUS)	5–1	Yi Shanjun (CHN)
Vardan Paloyan (ARM)	2–7	Choi Sang-sun (KOR)
Trond Arild Larsen (NOR)	0–8	Konstantinos Arkoudeas (GRE)
Yassine Djakrir (ALG)	0–10	Akaki Chachua (GEO)
Michael Beilin (ISR)	3–0	Emil Budinov (BUL)
Ahad Pazaj (IRI)	0–8	Şeref Eroğlu (TUR)
Şevket Karapınar (GER)	10–0	Riccardo Magni (ITA)
Mitsuoki Hirai (JPN)	0–10	Robert Mazouch (CZE)
Beat Motzer (SUI)	2–1	Oleg Litvinenko (UKR)
Juan Marén (CUB)	4–5	Włodzimierz Zawadzki (POL)
Peter Rónai (HUN)	3–1 Fall	Robert Olsson (SWE)
Bakhodir Kurbanov (UZB)	0–5	Mkhitar Manukyan (KAZ)
Melchor Manibusan (GUM)		Bye

=== Round 2 ===
	Score	
Round of 16
Melchor Manibusan (GUM)	0–9 Fall	Kevin Bracken (USA)
Leonard Frîncu (ROM)	0–9	Nikolay Monov (RUS)
Choi Sang-sun (KOR)	4–0	Konstantinos Arkoudeas (GRE)
Akaki Chachua (GEO)	0–3	Michael Beilin (ISR)
Şeref Eroğlu (TUR)	10–0	Şevket Karapınar (GER)
Robert Mazouch (CZE)	1–1	Beat Motzer (SUI)
Włodzimierz Zawadzki (POL)	1–9	Peter Rónai (HUN)
Mkhitar Manukyan (KAZ)		Bye
Repechage
Ismo Kamesaki (FIN)	0–1	Pavel Panish (BLR)
Yi Shanjun (CHN)	5–1	Vardan Paloyan (ARM)
Trond Arild Larsen (NOR)	5–1	Yassine Djakrir (ALG)
Emil Budinov (BUL)	2–7	Ahad Pazaj (IRI)
Riccardo Magni (ITA)	7–5	Mitsuoki Hirai (JPN)
Oleg Litvinenko (UKR)	0–4	Juan Marén (CUB)
Robert Olsson (SWE)	0–10	Bakhodir Kurbanov (UZB)

=== Round 3 ===
	Score	
Quarterfinals
Mkhitar Manukyan (KAZ)	10–0	Kevin Bracken (USA)
Nikolay Monov (RUS)	3–4	Choi Sang-sun (KOR)
Michael Beilin (ISR)	4–8	Şeref Eroğlu (TUR)
Beat Motzer (SUI)	0–5	Peter Rónai (HUN)
Repechage
Pavel Panish (BLR)	1–0	Yi Shanjun (CHN)
Trond Arild Larsen (NOR)	0–12	Ahad Pazaj (IRI)
Riccardo Magni (ITA)	0–10	Juan Marén (CUB)
Bakhodir Kurbanov (UZB)	10–0	Melchor Manibusan (GUM)
Leonard Frîncu (ROM)	3–1	Konstantinos Arkoudeas (GRE)
Akaki Chachua (GEO)	6–2	Robert Mazouch (CZE)
Włodzimierz Zawadzki (POL)		Bye

=== Round 4 ===
	Score	
Repechage
Włodzimierz Zawadzki (POL)	3–0	Pavel Panish (BLR)
Ahad Pazaj (IRI)	0–4	Juan Marén (CUB)
Bakhodir Kurbanov (UZB)	11–0	Leonard Frîncu (ROM)
Akaki Chachua (GEO)	10–0	Kevin Bracken (USA)
Nikolay Monov (RUS)	5–0	Michael Beilin (ISR)
Beat Motzer (SUI)		Bye

=== Round 5 ===
	Score	
Semifinals
Mkhitar Manukyan (KAZ)	6–1	Choi Sang-sun (KOR)
Şeref Eroğlu (TUR)	4–1	Peter Rónai (HUN)
Repechage
Beat Motzer (SUI)	0–12	Włodzimierz Zawadzki (POL)
Juan Marén (CUB)	6–5	Bakhodir Kurbanov (UZB)
Akaki Chachua (GEO)	2–6	Nikolay Monov (RUS)

=== Round 6 ===
	Score	
Repechage
Włodzimierz Zawadzki (POL)	0–2	Nikolay Monov (RUS)
Juan Marén (CUB)		Bye

=== Round 7 ===
	Score	
Repechage
Choi Sang-sun (KOR)	4–1	Juan Marén (CUB)
Nikolay Monov (RUS)	4–0	Peter Rónai (HUN)

=== Finals ===
	Score	
Bronze medal match
Choi Sang-sun (KOR)	2–2	Nikolay Monov (RUS)
Final
Mkhitar Manukyan (KAZ)	3–0	Şeref Eroğlu (TUR)
