= 1999 World Wrestling Championships – Men's Greco-Roman 63 kg =

Men's Greco-Roman 63 kg at the 1999 World Championships
- Venue: Peace and Friendship Stadium
- Dates: 23–25 September 1999
- Competitors: 38 from 38 nations

Medalists
gold medal	Mkhitar Manukyan	Kazakhstan
silver medal	Şeref Eroğlu	Turkey
bronze medal	Michael Beilin	Israel

The men's Greco-Roman 63 kilograms is a competition featured at the 1999 World Wrestling Championships, and was held at the Peace and Friendship Stadium in Piraeus, Athens, Greece from 23 to 25 September 1999.

== Results ==
Legend

- F — Won by fall

=== Preliminary round ===
==== Pool 1 ====
Pos	Athlete	Pld	W	L	CP	TP	KOR	IRI	YUG
1	Park Young-shin (KOR)	2	2	0	6	10	—	4–3	6–0
2	Mehdi Nassiri (IRI)	2	1	1	4	10	1–3 PP	—	7–0
3	Vladimir Tatarski (YUG)	2	0	2	0	0	0–3 PO	0–3 PO	—

Source: Official website

==== Pool 2 ====
Pos	Athlete	Pld	W	L	CP	TP	AZE	BUL	GRE
1	Mehmet Akif Pirim (AZE)	2	2	0	6	9	—	4–1	5–0
2	Emil Budinov (BUL)	2	1	1	5	4	1–3 PP	—	3–0 Ret
3	Christos Gikas (GRE)	2	0	2	0	0	0–3 PO	0–4 PA	—

Source: Official website

==== Pool 3 ====
Pos	Athlete	Pld	W	L	CP	TP	VEN	ISR	MKD
1	Endrix Arteaga (VEN)	2	2	0	7	12	—	8–6	4–0 Fall
2	Michael Beilin (ISR)	2	1	1	5	18	1–3 PP	—	12–0
3	Miroslav Velkov (MKD)	2	0	2	0	0	0–4 TO	0–4 ST	—

Source: Official website

==== Pool 4 ====
Pos	Athlete	Pld	W	L	CP	TP	UZB	ROM	GEO
1	Bakhodir Kurbanov (UZB)	2	2	0	8	27	—	11–0 Fall	16–0
2	Leonard Frîncu (ROM)	2	1	1	3	14	0–4 TO	—	14–13
3	Akaki Chachua (GEO)	2	0	2	1	13	0–4 ST	1–3 PP	—

Source: Official website

==== Pool 5 ====
Pos	Athlete	Pld	W	L	CP	TP	UKR	USA	SWE
1	Hrihoriy Kamyshenko (UKR)	2	2	0	6	9	—	4–0	5–0
2	Shon Lewis (USA)	2	1	1	3	3	0–3 PO	—	3–0
3	Jimmy Samuelsson (SWE)	2	0	2	0	0	0–3 PO	0–3 PO	—

Source: Official website

==== Pool 6 ====
Pos	Athlete	Pld	W	L	CP	TP	ARM	FRA	SUI
1	Vaghinak Galstyan (ARM)	2	2	0	6	10	—	6–0	4–3
2	Philippe Bendjoudi (FRA)	2	1	1	3	6	0–3 PO	—	6–2
3	Beat Motzer (SUI)	2	0	2	2	5	1–3 PP	1–3 PP	—

Source: Official website

==== Pool 7 ====
Pos	Athlete	Pld	W	L	CP	TP	KAZ	RSA	TPE
1	Mkhitar Manukyan (KAZ)	2	2	0	8	27	—	21–0	6–0 Fall
2	Raynard Mouton (RSA)	2	1	1	4	14	0–4 ST	—	14–2 Fall
3	Tai Chien-chou (TPE)	2	0	2	0	2	0–4 TO	0–4 TO	—

Source: Official website

==== Pool 8 ====
Pos	Athlete	Pld	W	L	CP	TP	POL	CHN	CZE
1	Włodzimierz Zawadzki (POL)	2	2	0	6	8	—	3–2	5–3
2	Yi Shanjun (CHN)	2	1	1	5	12	1–3 PP	—	16–0
3	Robert Mazouch (CZE)	2	0	2	1	3	1–3 PP	0–4 ST	—

Source: Official website

==== Pool 9 ====
Pos	Athlete	Pld	W	L	CP	TP	FIN	CRO	GER
1	Mikael Lindgren (FIN)	2	2	0	7	11	—	4–1	7–3 Fall
2	Tomislav Vukelić (CRO)	2	1	1	4	5	1–3 PP	—	4–1
3	Ramazan Aydın (GER)	2	0	2	1	4	0–4 TO	1–3 PP	—

Source: Official website

==== Pool 10 ====
Pos	Athlete	Pld	W	L	CP	TP	BLR	CUB	KGZ
1	Eduard Aplevich (BLR)	2	2	0	7	17	—	5–0	12–0
2	Juan Marén (CUB)	2	1	1	3	10	0–3 PO	—	10–2
3	Nurjan Jusupov (KGZ)	2	0	2	1	2	0–4 ST	1–3 PP	—

Source: Official website

==== Pool 11 ====
Pos	Athlete	Pld	W	L	CP	TP	TUR	ITA	JPN	AUT
1	Şeref Eroğlu (TUR)	3	3	0	10	16	—	8–0 Fall	5–1	3–0
2	Riccardo Magni (ITA)	3	2	1	6	12	0–4 TO	—	9–1	3–1
3	Yasutoshi Motoki (JPN)	3	1	2	5	7	1–3 PP	1–3 PP	—	5–0
4	Peter Philippitsch (AUT)	3	0	3	1	1	0–3 PO	1–3 PP	0–3 PO	—

Source: Official website

==== Pool 12 ====
Pos	Athlete	Pld	W	L	CP	TP	RUS	HUN	TKM	SYR
1	Nikolay Monov (RUS)	3	3	0	11	18	—	3–0	15–0	WO
2	Peter Rónai (HUN)	3	2	1	7	7	0–3 PO	—	3–0	4–1 Fall
3	Döwletberdi Mamedow (TKM)	3	1	2	4	0	0–4 ST	0–3 PO	—	WO
4	Zakaria Nashed (SYR)	3	0	3	0	1	0–4 EF	0–4 TO	0–4 PA	—

Source: Official website

=== Knockout round ===
Round of 16
Park Young-shin (KOR)	3
Mehmet Akif Pirim (AZE)	2
Endrix Arteaga (VEN)	0
Bakhodir Kurbanov (UZB)	15
Hrihoriy Kamyshenko (UKR)	4
Vaghinak Galstyan (ARM)	0
Mkhitar Manukyan (KAZ)	9
Włodzimierz Zawadzki (POL)	5
Mikael Lindgren (FIN)	2
Eduard Aplevich (BLR)	5
Şeref Eroğlu (TUR)	9
Nikolay Monov (RUS)	3
Michael Beilin (ISR)	5
Yi Shanjun (CHN)	2
Riccardo Magni (ITA)	5
Peter Rónai (HUN)	4

Quarterfinals
Park Young-shin (KOR)	0
Bakhodir Kurbanov (UZB)	3
Hrihoriy Kamyshenko (UKR)	0
Mkhitar Manukyan (KAZ)	3^{F}
Eduard Aplevich (BLR)	7
Şeref Eroğlu (TUR)	9
Michael Beilin (ISR)	10
Riccardo Magni (ITA)	0

Semifinals
Bakhodir Kurbanov (UZB)	1
Mkhitar Manukyan (KAZ)	5
Şeref Eroğlu (TUR)	5
Michael Beilin (ISR)	0

Final
Mkhitar Manukyan (KAZ)	4
Şeref Eroğlu (TUR)	0
Bronze medal match
Bakhodir Kurbanov (UZB)	2
Michael Beilin (ISR)	4
