= 1997 World Wrestling Championships – Men's Greco-Roman 63 kg =

Men's Greco-Roman 63 kg at the 1997 World Championships
- Venue: Hala Ludowa
- Dates: 10–12 September 1997
- Competitors: 28 from 28 nations

Medalists
gold medal	Şeref Eroğlu	Turkey
silver medal	Nikolay Monov	Russia
bronze medal	Włodzimierz Zawadzki	Poland

The men's Greco-Roman 63 kilograms is a competition featured at the 1997 World Wrestling Championships, and was held in Wrocław, Poland from 10 to 12 September 1997.

== Results ==
Legend

- 3C — Won by 3 cautions given to the opponent

=== Round 1 ===
	Score	
Round of 32
David Zuniga (USA)	1–1	Mátyás Megyes (HUN)
Víctor Castellanos (MEX)	0–10	Juan Marén (CUB)
Konstantinos Arkoudeas (GRE)	3–0	Winston Santos (VEN)
Oleksandr Stepanyan (UKR)	3–0	Peter Philippitsch (AUT)
Akaki Chachua (GEO)	6–2	Thierry Bastien (FRA)
Michael Beilin (ISR)	3–0	Leonard Frîncu (ROM)
Niklas Hentunen (SWE)	0–7	Włodzimierz Zawadzki (POL)
Robert Mazouch (CZE)	0–1	Yasutoshi Motoki (JPN)
Yury Mirutenko (BLR)	0–10	Ramazan Aydın (GER)
Rui Tavares (POR)	4–10	Bakhodir Kurbanov (UZB)
Beat Motzer (SUI)	5–14	Kim Kyung-jung (KOR)
Şeref Eroğlu (TUR)	11–0	Vladimir Tatarski (YUG)
Martin Kolář (SVK)	2–4	Mikael Lindgren (FIN)
Mkhitar Manukyan (KAZ)	1–3	Nikolay Monov (RUS)

=== Round 2 ===
	Score	
Round of 16
David Zuniga (USA)	2–5	Juan Marén (CUB)
Konstantinos Arkoudeas (GRE)	0–3	Oleksandr Stepanyan (UKR)
Akaki Chachua (GEO)	6–0	Michael Beilin (ISR)
Włodzimierz Zawadzki (POL)	8–0	Yasutoshi Motoki (JPN)
Ramazan Aydın (GER)	0–11	Bakhodir Kurbanov (UZB)
Kim Kyung-jung (KOR)	1–5	Şeref Eroğlu (TUR)
Mikael Lindgren (FIN)	0–7	Nikolay Monov (RUS)
Repechage
Mátyás Megyes (HUN)	10–0	Víctor Castellanos (MEX)
Winston Santos (VEN)	1–3	Peter Philippitsch (AUT)
Thierry Bastien (FRA)	2–3	Leonard Frîncu (ROM)
Niklas Hentunen (SWE)	7–3 Fall	Robert Mazouch (CZE)
Yury Mirutenko (BLR)	2–0 Ret	Rui Tavares (POR)
Beat Motzer (SUI)	13–1	Vladimir Tatarski (YUG)
Martin Kolář (SVK)	0–10	Mkhitar Manukyan (KAZ)

=== Round 3 ===
	Score	
Quarterfinals
Juan Marén (CUB)	3–0	Oleksandr Stepanyan (UKR)
Akaki Chachua (GEO)	3–4	Włodzimierz Zawadzki (POL)
Bakhodir Kurbanov (UZB)	0–11	Şeref Eroğlu (TUR)
Nikolay Monov (RUS)		Bye
Repechage
Mátyás Megyes (HUN)	2–1	Peter Philippitsch (AUT)
Leonard Frîncu (ROM)	4–0	Robert Mazouch (CZE)
Yury Mirutenko (BLR)	8–0 Ret	Beat Motzer (SUI)
Mkhitar Manukyan (KAZ)	4–1	David Zuniga (USA)
Konstantinos Arkoudeas (GRE)	0–4 Fall	Michael Beilin (ISR)
Yasutoshi Motoki (JPN)	2–7	Ramazan Aydın (GER)
Kim Kyung-jung (KOR)	3–4 Fall	Mikael Lindgren (FIN)

=== Round 4 ===
	Score	
Repechage
Mátyás Megyes (HUN)	2–2	Leonard Frîncu (ROM)
Yury Mirutenko (BLR)	0–6	Mkhitar Manukyan (KAZ)
Michael Beilin (ISR)	10–0	Ramazan Aydın (GER)
Mikael Lindgren (FIN)	2–6 Fall	Oleksandr Stepanyan (UKR)
Akaki Chachua (GEO)	14–3	Bakhodir Kurbanov (UZB)

=== Round 5 ===
	Score	
Semifinals
Nikolay Monov (RUS)	3–0	Juan Marén (CUB)
Włodzimierz Zawadzki (POL)	1–4	Şeref Eroğlu (TUR)
Repechage
Mátyás Megyes (HUN)	0–7 3C	Mkhitar Manukyan (KAZ)
Michael Beilin (ISR)	5–2	Oleksandr Stepanyan (UKR)
Akaki Chachua (GEO)		Bye

=== Round 6 ===
	Score	
Repechage
Akaki Chachua (GEO)	2–5	Mkhitar Manukyan (KAZ)
Michael Beilin (ISR)		Bye

=== Round 7 ===
	Score	
Repechage
Juan Marén (CUB)	2–3	Michael Beilin (ISR)
Mkhitar Manukyan (KAZ)	2–3	Włodzimierz Zawadzki (POL)

=== Finals ===
	Score	
5th place match
Juan Marén (CUB)	0–4	Mkhitar Manukyan (KAZ)
Bronze medal match
Michael Beilin (ISR)	0–3 Fall	Włodzimierz Zawadzki (POL)
Final
Nikolay Monov (RUS)	0–3	Şeref Eroğlu (TUR)
