= Wrestling at the 2000 Summer Olympics – Men's Greco-Roman 63 kg =

Men's Greco-Roman 63 kg at the Games of the XXVII Olympiad
- Venue: Sydney Convention and Exhibition Centre
- Date: 24–26 September 2000
- Competitors: 20 from 20 nations

Medalists
1st place, gold medalist(s)		Varteres Samurgashev	Russia
2nd place, silver medalist(s)		Juan Marén	Cuba
3rd place, bronze medalist(s)		Akaki Chachua	Georgia

The men's Greco-Roman 63 kilograms at the 2000 Summer Olympics as part of the wrestling program was held at the Sydney Convention and Exhibition Centre from September 24 to 26. The competition held with an elimination system of three or four wrestlers in each pool, with the winners qualify for the quarterfinals, semifinals and final by way of direct elimination.

== Schedule ==
All times are Australian Eastern Daylight Time (UTC+11:00)

Date	Time	Event
24 September 2000	09:30	Round 1
24 September 2000	09:30	Round 2
24 September 2000	17:00	Round 3
25 September 2000	09:30	Quarterfinals
25 September 2000	17:00	Semifinals
26 September 2000	17:00	Finals

== Results ==
Legend

- F — Won by fall
- WO — Won by walkover

=== Elimination pools ===
==== Pool 1 ====
Pos	Athlete	Pld	W	L	CP	TP	Qualification
1	Varteres Samurgashev (RUS)	2	2	0	6	13	Knockout round
2	Şeref Eroğlu (TUR)	2	1	1	5	2	
3	Włodzimierz Zawadzki (POL)	2	0	2	0	0	

Source: Official Report

	Score		CP
Varteres Samurgashev (RUS)	5–2	Şeref Eroğlu (TUR)	3–1 PP
Włodzimierz Zawadzki (POL)	0–8	Varteres Samurgashev (RUS)	0–3 PO
Şeref Eroğlu (TUR)	WO	Włodzimierz Zawadzki (POL)	4–0 PA

==== Pool 2 ====
Pos	Athlete	Pld	W	L	CP	TP	Qualification
1	Kevin Bracken (USA)	2	1	1	4	14	Knockout round
2	Choi Sang-sun (KOR)	2	1	1	4	10	
3	Riccardo Magni (ITA)	2	1	1	4	3	

Source: Official Report

	Score		CP
Kevin Bracken (USA)	12–5	Choi Sang-sun (KOR)	3–1 PP
Riccardo Magni (ITA)	2–2	Kevin Bracken (USA)	3–1 PP
Choi Sang-sun (KOR)	5–1	Riccardo Magni (ITA)	3–1 PP

==== Pool 3 ====
Pos	Athlete	Pld	W	L	CP	TP	Qualification
1	Akaki Chachua (GEO)	2	2	0	7	17	Knockout round
2	Vaghinak Galstyan (ARM)	2	1	1	4	7	
3	Yi Shanjun (CHN)	2	0	2	1	2	

Source: Official Report

	Score		CP
Akaki Chachua (GEO)	11–0 Fall	Yi Shanjun (CHN)	4–0 TO
Vaghinak Galstyan (ARM)	5–6	Akaki Chachua (GEO)	1–3 PP
Yi Shanjun (CHN)	2–2	Vaghinak Galstyan (ARM)	1–3 PP

==== Pool 4 ====
Pos	Athlete	Pld	W	L	CP	TP	Qualification
1	Bakhodir Kurbanov (UZB)	2	2	0	6	10	Knockout round
2	Michael Beilin (ISR)	2	1	1	3	1	
3	Vitaly Zhuk (BLR)	2	0	2	1	1	

Source: Official Report

	Score		CP
Vitaly Zhuk (BLR)	0–1	Michael Beilin (ISR)	0–3 PO
Bakhodir Kurbanov (UZB)	6–1	Vitaly Zhuk (BLR)	3–1 PP
Michael Beilin (ISR)	0–4	Bakhodir Kurbanov (UZB)	0–3 PO

==== Pool 5 ====
Pos	Athlete	Pld	W	L	CP	TP	Qualification
1	Juan Marén (CUB)	3	3	0	9	17	Knockout round
2	Mkhitar Manukyan (KAZ)	3	2	1	8	22	
3	Gurbinder Singh (IND)	3	1	2	4	6	
4	Yassine Djakrir (ALG)	3	0	3	1	1	

Source: Official Report

	Score		CP
Juan Marén (CUB)	8–0	Gurbinder Singh (IND)	3–0 PO
Mkhitar Manukyan (KAZ)	11–0	Yassine Djakrir (ALG)	4–0 ST
Juan Marén (CUB)	5–3	Mkhitar Manukyan (KAZ)	3–1 PP
Gurbinder Singh (IND)	3–0	Yassine Djakrir (ALG)	3–0 PO
Juan Marén (CUB)	4–1	Yassine Djakrir (ALG)	3–1 PP
Gurbinder Singh (IND)	3–8	Mkhitar Manukyan (KAZ)	1–3 PP

==== Pool 6 ====
Pos	Athlete	Pld	W	L	CP	TP	Qualification
1	Beat Motzer (SUI)	3	3	0	10	22	Knockout round
2	Hrihoriy Kamyshenko (UKR)	3	2	1	8	14	
3	Yasutoshi Motoki (JPN)	3	1	2	6	18	
4	Rasoul Amani (NZL)	3	0	3	0	0	

Source: Official Report

	Score		CP
Yasutoshi Motoki (JPN)	3–8	Beat Motzer (SUI)	1–3 PP
Rasoul Amani (NZL)	0–10	Hrihoriy Kamyshenko (UKR)	0–4 ST
Yasutoshi Motoki (JPN)	14–0	Rasoul Amani (NZL)	4–0 ST
Beat Motzer (SUI)	3–1	Hrihoriy Kamyshenko (UKR)	3–1 PP
Yasutoshi Motoki (JPN)	1–3	Hrihoriy Kamyshenko (UKR)	1–3 PP
Beat Motzer (SUI)	11–0	Rasoul Amani (NZL)	4–0 ST

=== Knockout round ===
Quarterfinals
Varteres Samurgashev (RUS)	11
Kevin Bracken (USA)	5
Akaki Chachua (GEO)	3
Bakhodir Kurbanov (UZB)	2

Semifinals
Varteres Samurgashev (RUS)	7
Akaki Chachua (GEO)	4
Juan Marén (CUB)	3
Beat Motzer (SUI)	0

Gold medal match
Varteres Samurgashev (RUS)	3
Juan Marén (CUB)	0
Bronze medal match
Akaki Chachua (GEO)	6^{F}
Beat Motzer (SUI)	2

Classification 5th–6th
Kevin Bracken (USA)	0
Bakhodir Kurbanov (UZB)	10

== Final standing ==
Rank	Athlete
1st place, gold medalist(s)	Varteres Samurgashev (RUS)
2nd place, silver medalist(s)	Juan Marén (CUB)
3rd place, bronze medalist(s)	Akaki Chachua (GEO)
4	Beat Motzer (SUI)
5	Bakhodir Kurbanov (UZB)
6	Kevin Bracken (USA)
7	Mkhitar Manukyan (KAZ)
8	Hrihoriy Kamyshenko (UKR)
9	Yasutoshi Motoki (JPN)
10	Şeref Eroğlu (TUR)
11	Choi Sang-sun (KOR)
12	Vaghinak Galstyan (ARM)
13	Gurbinder Singh (IND)
14	Riccardo Magni (ITA)
15	Michael Beilin (ISR)
16	Yi Shanjun (CHN)
17	Vitaly Zhuk (BLR)
18	Yassine Djakrir (ALG)
19	Włodzimierz Zawadzki (POL)
20	Rasoul Amani (NZL)
