= 2001 World Wrestling Championships – Men's Greco-Roman 63 kg =

Men's Greco-Roman 63 kg at the 2001 World Championships
- Venue: Dimitris Tofalos Arena
- Dates: 6–8 December 2001
- Competitors: 33 from 33 nations

Medalists
gold medal	Vaghinak Galstyan	Armenia
silver medal	Kim In-sub	South Korea
bronze medal	Michael Beilin	Israel

The men's Greco-Roman 63 kilograms is a competition featured at the 2001 World Wrestling Championships, and was held at the Dimitris Tofalos Arena in Patras, Greece from 6 to 8 December 2001.

== Results ==
Legend

- F — Won by fall

=== Preliminary round ===
==== Pool 1 ====
Pos	Athlete	Pld	W	L	CP	TP	ISR	UZB	AZE
1	Michael Beilin (ISR)	2	2	0	7	19	—	11–5	8–2 Fall
2	Bakhodir Kurbanov (UZB)	2	1	1	4	15	1–3 PP	—	10–8
3	Elbrus Mammadov (AZE)	2	0	2	1	10	0–4 TO	1–3 PP	—

Source: Japan Wrestling

==== Pool 2 ====
Pos	Athlete	Pld	W	L	CP	TP	SUI	AUT	CHI
1	Beat Motzer (SUI)	2	2	0	7	14	—	3–2	11–0
2	Peter Philippitsch (AUT)	2	1	1	5	12	1–3 PP	—	10–0
3	César Troncoso (CHI)	2	0	2	0	0	0–4 ST	0–4 ST	—

Source: Japan Wrestling

==== Pool 3 ====
Pos	Athlete	Pld	W	L	CP	TP	USA	GRE	TPE
1	Kevin Bracken (USA)	2	2	0	7	17	—	6–0	11–0
2	Christos Gikas (GRE)	2	1	1	4	0	0–3 PO	—	WO
3	Yen Shih-chieh (TPE)	2	0	2	0	0	0–4 ST	0–4 PA	—

Source: Japan Wrestling

==== Pool 4 ====
Pos	Athlete	Pld	W	L	CP	TP	GEO	GER	ROM
1	Akaki Chachua (GEO)	2	2	0	8	14	—	8–2 Fall	6–1 Fall
2	Jurij Kohl (GER)	2	1	1	3	5	0–4 TO	—	3–0
3	Eusebiu Diaconu (ROM)	2	0	2	0	1	0–4 TO	0–3 PO	—

Source: Japan Wrestling

==== Pool 5 ====
Pos	Athlete	Pld	W	L	CP	TP	IRI	TKM	NOR
1	Mehdi Nassiri (IRI)	2	2	0	6	11	—	3–0	8–0
2	Döwletberdi Mamedow (TKM)	2	1	1	4	10	0–3 PO	—	10–0
3	Stig Hansen Hauan (NOR)	2	0	2	0	0	0–3 PO	0–4 ST	—

Source: Japan Wrestling

==== Pool 6 ====
Pos	Athlete	Pld	W	L	CP	TP	BLR	NED	PER
1	Eduard Aplevich (BLR)	2	2	0	8	24	—	11–0	13–0
2	Hovhannes Kurghinyan (NED)	2	1	1	3	6	0–4 ST	—	6–0
3	José Paico (PER)	2	0	2	0	0	0–4 ST	0–3 PO	—

Source: Japan Wrestling

==== Pool 7 ====
Pos	Athlete	Pld	W	L	CP	TP	KOR	UKR	JPN
1	Kim In-sub (KOR)	2	2	0	7	15	—	4–0	11–0
2	Dmytro Monastyrsky (UKR)	2	1	1	3	6	0–3 PO	—	6–0
3	Masaki Imuro (JPN)	2	0	2	0	0	0–4 ST	0–3 PO	—

Source: Japan Wrestling

==== Pool 8 ====
Pos	Athlete	Pld	W	L	CP	TP	HUN	TUR	POL
1	Levente Füredy (HUN)	2	2	0	6	8	—	4–3	4–3
2	Şeref Eroğlu (TUR)	2	1	1	4	9	1–3 PP	—	6–4
3	Włodzimierz Zawadzki (POL)	2	0	2	2	7	1–3 PP	1–3 PP	—

Source: Japan Wrestling

==== Pool 9 ====
Pos	Athlete	Pld	W	L	CP	TP	CUB	IND	MDA
1	Juan Marén (CUB)	2	2	0	7	15	—	4–2	11–0
2	Gurbinder Singh (IND)	2	1	1	4	9	1–3 PP	—	7–2
3	Ion Gaimer (MDA)	2	0	2	1	2	0–4 ST	1–3 PP	—

Source: Japan Wrestling

==== Pool 10 ====
Pos	Athlete	Pld	W	L	CP	TP	CHN	BUL	RUS
1	Cui Peng (CHN)	2	2	0	6	5	—	2–1	3–1
2	Nikolay Gergov (BUL)	2	1	1	4	3	1–3 PP	—	2–1
3	Igor Chuchunov (RUS)	2	0	2	2	2	1–3 PP	1–3 PP	—

Source: Japan Wrestling

==== Pool 11 ====
Pos	Athlete	Pld	W	L	CP	TP	ARM	SWE	DEN
1	Vaghinak Galstyan (ARM)	2	2	0	8	23	—	10–0	13–0
2	Urban Holm (SWE)	2	1	1	3	8	0–4 ST	—	8–0
3	Morten Helt (DEN)	2	0	2	0	0	0–4 ST	0–3 PO	—

Source: Japan Wrestling

=== Knockout round ===
Round of 16
Michael Beilin (ISR)	13
Beat Motzer (SUI)	2
Kevin Bracken (USA)	13
Akaki Chachua (GEO)	2
Mehdi Nassiri (IRI)	0
Eduard Aplevich (BLR)	5^{F}

Quarterfinals
Michael Beilin (ISR)	3
Kevin Bracken (USA)	2
Eduard Aplevich (BLR)	5
Kim In-sub (KOR)	7
Levente Füredy (HUN)	1
Juan Marén (CUB)	3
Cui Peng (CHN)	3
Vaghinak Galstyan (ARM)	6

Semifinals
Michael Beilin (ISR)	2
Kim In-sub (KOR)	3
Juan Marén (CUB)	2
Vaghinak Galstyan (ARM)	5

Final
Kim In-sub (KOR)	3
Vaghinak Galstyan (ARM)	8
Bronze medal match
Michael Beilin (ISR)	3
Juan Marén (CUB)	0
