= Wrestling at the 1996 Summer Olympics – Men's Greco-Roman 62 kg =

Men's Greco-Roman 62 kg at the Games of the XXVI Olympiad
- Venue: Georgia World Congress Center
- Dates: 22–23 July 1996
- Competitors: 19 from 19 nations

Medalists
1st place, gold medalist(s)		Włodzimierz Zawadzki	Poland
2nd place, silver medalist(s)		Juan Marén	Cuba
3rd place, bronze medalist(s)		Mehmet Akif Pirim	Turkey

The men's Greco-Roman 62 kilograms at the 1996 Summer Olympics as part of the wrestling program were held at the Georgia World Congress Center from July 22 to July 23. The gold and silver medalists were determined by the final match of the main single-elimination bracket. The losers advanced to the repechage. These matches determined the bronze medalist for the event.

== Results ==
Legend

- WO — Won by walkover

=== Round 1 ===
	Score		CP
1/16 finals
Arutik Rubenian (GRE)	1–4	Koba Guliashvili (GEO)	1–3 PP
Włodzimierz Zawadzki (POL)	4–3	Igor Petrenko (BLR)	3–1 PP
Marco Sánchez (PUR)	5–6	Usama Aziz (SWE)	1–3 PP
Mkhitar Manukyan (ARM)	11–0	Hu Guohong (CHN)	4–0 ST
Hrihoriy Kamyshenko (UKR)	10–0	Winston Santos (VEN)	4–0 ST
Ivan Ivanov (BUL)	1–1	Mehmet Akif Pirim (TUR)	3–1 PP
David Zuniga (USA)	3–2	Ainsley Robinson (CAN)	3–1 PP
Choi Sang-sun (KOR)	0–3	Sergey Martynov (RUS)	0–3 PO
Juan Marén (CUB)	5–2	Ahad Pazaj (IRI)	3–1 PP
Bakhodir Kurbanov (UZB)		Bye	

=== Round 2 ===
	Score		CP
1/8 finals
Bakhodir Kurbanov (UZB)	3–10	Koba Guliashvili (GEO)	1–3 PP
Włodzimierz Zawadzki (POL)	3–1	Usama Aziz (SWE)	3–1 PP
Mkhitar Manukyan (ARM)	2–3	Hrihoriy Kamyshenko (UKR)	1–3 PP
Ivan Ivanov (BUL)	3–1	David Zuniga (USA)	3–1 PP
Sergey Martynov (RUS)	4–5	Juan Marén (CUB)	1–3 PP
Repechage
Arutik Rubenian (GRE)	1–3	Igor Petrenko (BLR)	1–3 PP
Marco Sánchez (PUR)	3–8	Hu Guohong (CHN)	1–3 PP
Winston Santos (VEN)	0–5	Mehmet Akif Pirim (TUR)	0–3 PO
Ainsley Robinson (CAN)	0–7	Choi Sang-sun (KOR)	0–3 PO
Ahad Pazaj (IRI)		Bye	

=== Round 3 ===
	Score		CP
Quarterfinals
Koba Guliashvili (GEO)	1–3	Włodzimierz Zawadzki (POL)	1–3 PP
Hrihoriy Kamyshenko (UKR)		Bye	
Ivan Ivanov (BUL)		Bye	
Juan Marén (CUB)		Bye	
Repechage
Ahad Pazaj (IRI)	6–2 Fall	Igor Petrenko (BLR)	4–0 TO
Hu Guohong (CHN)	1–3	Mehmet Akif Pirim (TUR)	1–3 PP
Choi Sang-sun (KOR)	11–1	Bakhodir Kurbanov (UZB)	4–1 SP
Usama Aziz (SWE)	0–4	Mkhitar Manukyan (ARM)	0–3 PO
David Zuniga (USA)	6–6	Sergey Martynov (RUS)	1–3 PP

=== Round 4 ===
	Score		CP
Semifinals
Włodzimierz Zawadzki (POL)	8–2	Hrihoriy Kamyshenko (UKR)	3–1 PP
Ivan Ivanov (BUL)	1–4	Juan Marén (CUB)	1–3 PP
Repechage
Ahad Pazaj (IRI)	0–4	Mehmet Akif Pirim (TUR)	0–3 PO
Choi Sang-sun (KOR)	0–5 Fall	Mkhitar Manukyan (ARM)	0–4 TO
Sergey Martynov (RUS)	2–7	Koba Guliashvili (GEO)	1–3 PP

=== Round 5 ===
	Score		CP
Repechage
Mehmet Akif Pirim (TUR)	9–4	Mkhitar Manukyan (ARM)	3–1 PP
Koba Guliashvili (GEO)		Bye	

=== Round 6 ===
	Score		CP
Repechage
Hrihoriy Kamyshenko (UKR)	1–2	Mehmet Akif Pirim (TUR)	1–3 PP
Koba Guliashvili (GEO)	3–1	Ivan Ivanov (BUL)	3–1 PP

=== Finals ===
	Score		CP
Classification 7th–8th
Mkhitar Manukyan (ARM)	WO	Sergey Martynov (RUS)	4–0 PA
Classification 5th–6th
Hrihoriy Kamyshenko (UKR)	0–3	Ivan Ivanov (BUL)	0–3 PO
Bronze medal match
Mehmet Akif Pirim (TUR)	9–0	Koba Guliashvili (GEO)	3–0 PO
Gold medal match
Włodzimierz Zawadzki (POL)	3–1	Juan Marén (CUB)	3–1 PP

== Final standing ==
Rank	Athlete
1st place, gold medalist(s)	Włodzimierz Zawadzki (POL)
2nd place, silver medalist(s)	Juan Marén (CUB)
3rd place, bronze medalist(s)	Mehmet Akif Pirim (TUR)
4	Koba Guliashvili (GEO)
5	Ivan Ivanov (BUL)
6	Hrihoriy Kamyshenko (UKR)
7	Mkhitar Manukyan (ARM)
8	Sergey Martynov (RUS)
9	Choi Sang-sun (KOR)
10	David Zuniga (USA)
11	Ahad Pazaj (IRI)
12	Hu Guohong (CHN)
13	Igor Petrenko (BLR)
14	Usama Aziz (SWE)
15	Marco Sánchez (PUR)
16	Bakhodir Kurbanov (UZB)
17	Arutik Rubenian (GRE)
18	Ainsley Robinson (CAN)
19	Winston Santos (VEN)
