= Wrestling at the 1998 Asian Games =

- Venue: Thammasat Gymnasium 1
- Dates: 12–18 December 1998
- Competitors: 175 from 20 nations

Wrestling was one of the many sports which was held at the 1998 Asian Games in Bangkok, Thailand between 12 and 18 December 1998. The competition took place at Thammasat Gymnasium 1.

== Schedule ==
P	Preliminary rounds	F	Finals

Event↓/Date →	12th Sat	13th Sun		14th Mon		15th Tue	16th Wed	17th Thu		18th Fri	
Men's freestyle 54 kg							P	P	F		
Men's freestyle 58 kg								P		P	F
Men's freestyle 63 kg							P	P	F		
Men's freestyle 69 kg								P		P	F
Men's freestyle 76 kg							P	P	F		
Men's freestyle 85 kg								P		P	F
Men's freestyle 97 kg							P	P	F		
Men's freestyle 130 kg								P		P	F
Men's Greco-Roman 54 kg	P	P	F								
Men's Greco-Roman 58 kg		P		P	F						
Men's Greco-Roman 63 kg	P	P	F								
Men's Greco-Roman 69 kg		P		P	F						
Men's Greco-Roman 76 kg	P	P	F								
Men's Greco-Roman 85 kg		P		P	F						
Men's Greco-Roman 97 kg	P	P	F								
Men's Greco-Roman 130 kg		P		P	F						

== Medalists ==
=== Freestyle ===
Event	Gold	Silver	Bronze
54 kg	Jin Ju-dong; North Korea	Behnam Tayyebi; Iran	Maulen Mamyrov; Kazakhstan
58 kg	Ri Yong-sam; North Korea	Oyuunbilegiin Pürevbaatar; Mongolia	Mohammad Talaei; Iran
63 kg	Jang Jae-sung; South Korea	Ramil Islamov; Uzbekistan	Tserenbaataryn Tsogtbayar; Mongolia
69 kg	Amir Tavakkolian; Iran	Ahmad Al-Osta; Syria	Ryusaburo Katsu; Japan
76 kg	Moon Eui-jae; South Korea	Kenji Koshiba; Japan	Ruslan Veliyev; Kazakhstan
85 kg	Alireza Heidari; Iran	Rasul Katinovasov; Uzbekistan	Magomed Kurugliyev; Kazakhstan
97 kg	Abbas Jadidi; Iran	Dolgorsürengiin Sumiyaabazar; Mongolia	Soslan Fraev; Uzbekistan
130 kg	Alireza Rezaei; Iran	Georgy Kaysinov; Uzbekistan	Gelegjamtsyn Ösökhbayar; Mongolia

=== Greco-Roman ===
Event	Gold	Silver	Bronze
54 kg	Sim Kwon-ho; South Korea	Kang Yong-gyun; North Korea	Wang Hui; China
58 kg	Kim In-sub; South Korea	Asliddin Khudoyberdiev; Uzbekistan	Sheng Zetian; China
63 kg	Choi Sang-sun; South Korea	Bakhodir Kurbanov; Uzbekistan	Yi Shanjun; China
69 kg	Son Sang-pil; South Korea	Mkhitar Manukyan; Kazakhstan	Grigori Pulyaev; Uzbekistan
76 kg	Bakhtiyar Baiseitov; Kazakhstan	Takamitsu Katayama; Japan	Kim Jung-sub; South Korea
85 kg	Park Myung-suk; South Korea	Raatbek Sanatbayev; Kyrgyzstan	Hidekazu Yokoyama; Japan
97 kg	Sergey Matviyenko; Kazakhstan	Mohammad Al-Haiek; Syria	Park Woo; South Korea
130 kg	Mehdi Sabzali; Iran	Shermukhammad Kuziev; Uzbekistan	Zhao Hailin; China

== Medal table ==
Rank	Nation	Gold	Silver	Bronze	Total
1	South Korea (KOR)	7	0	2	9
2	Iran (IRI)	5	1	1	7
3	Kazakhstan (KAZ)	2	1	3	6
4	North Korea (PRK)	2	1	0	3
5	Uzbekistan (UZB)	0	6	2	8
6	Japan (JPN)	0	2	2	4
6	Mongolia (MGL)	0	2	2	4
8	Syria (SYR)	0	2	0	2
9	Kyrgyzstan (KGZ)	0	1	0	1
10	China (CHN)	0	0	4	4
Totals (10 entries)		16	16	16	48

== Participating nations ==
A total of 175 athletes from 20 nations competed in wrestling at the 1998 Asian Games:

- China (10)
- Chinese Taipei (2)
- India (6)
- Iran (16)
- Japan (16)
- Kazakhstan (16)
- Kyrgyzstan (12)
- Lebanon (3)
- Mongolia (9)
- Nepal (3)
- North Korea (7)
- Pakistan (2)
- Philippines (6)
- South Korea (16)
- Syria (10)
- Thailand (14)
- Turkmenistan (3)
- Uzbekistan (16)
- Vietnam (6)
- Yemen (2)
