= Wrestling at the 1998 Asian Games – Men's Greco-Roman 63 kg =

Wrestling event

Men's Greco-Roman 63 kg at the 1998 Asian Games
- Venue: Thammasat Gymnasium 1
- Dates: 12–13 December 1998
- Competitors: 14 from 14 nations

Medalists
gold medal	Choi Sang-sun	South Korea
silver medal	Bakhodir Kurbanov	Uzbekistan
bronze medal	Yi Shanjun	China

The men's Greco-Roman 63 kilograms wrestling competition at the 1998 Asian Games in Bangkok was held on 12 December and 13 December at the Thammasat Gymnasium 1.

The gold and silver medalists were determined by the final match of the main single-elimination bracket. The losers advanced to the repechage. These matches determined the bronze medalist for the event.

== Schedule ==
All times are Indochina Time (UTC+07:00)

Date	Time	Event
Saturday, 12 December 1998	09:00	Round 1
Saturday, 12 December 1998	16:00	Round 2
Saturday, 12 December 1998	16:00	Round 3
Sunday, 13 December 1998	09:00	Round 4
Sunday, 13 December 1998	09:00	Round 5
Sunday, 13 December 1998	16:00	Finals

== Results ==
=== Round 1 ===
	Score		CP
1/8 finals
Kim Hak-gwon (PRK)	12–0	Ronilo Sabijon (PHI)	4–0 ST
Nurlan Koizhaiganov (KAZ)	3–9	Bakhodir Kurbanov (UZB)	1–3 PP
Norjingiin Bayarmagnai (MGL)	2–8	Mitsuoki Hirai (JPN)	1–3 PP
Surachet Kwannai (THA)	0–11	Choi Sang-sun (KOR)	0–4 ST
Döwletberdi Mamedow (TKM)	0–3	Parviz Zeidvand (IRI)	0–3 PO
Yi Shanjun (CHN)	3–0	Valentin Malutin (KGZ)	3–0 PO
Zakaria Nashed (SYR)	4–1	Gurbinder Singh (IND)	3–1 PP

=== Round 2 ===
	Score		CP
Quarterfinals
Kim Hak-gwon (PRK)	3–16	Bakhodir Kurbanov (UZB)	1–4 SP
Mitsuoki Hirai (JPN)	1–3	Choi Sang-sun (KOR)	1–3 PP
Parviz Zeidvand (IRI)	1–2	Yi Shanjun (CHN)	1–3 PP
Zakaria Nashed (SYR)		Bye	
Repechage
Ronilo Sabijon (PHI)	0–11	Nurlan Koizhaiganov (KAZ)	0–4 ST
Norjingiin Bayarmagnai (MGL)	7–0 Fall	Surachet Kwannai (THA)	4–0 TO
Döwletberdi Mamedow (TKM)	0–2	Valentin Malutin (KGZ)	0–3 PO
Gurbinder Singh (IND)		Bye	

- Parviz Zeidvand (IRI) was disqualified from the rest of the competition for unsportsmanlike conduct.

=== Round 3 ===
	Score		CP
Semifinals
Zakaria Nashed (SYR)	0–5 Fall	Bakhodir Kurbanov (UZB)	0–4 TO
Choi Sang-sun (KOR)	4–2	Yi Shanjun (CHN)	3–1 PP
Repechage
Gurbinder Singh (IND)	0–5	Nurlan Koizhaiganov (KAZ)	0–3 PO
Norjingiin Bayarmagnai (MGL)	0–10	Valentin Malutin (KGZ)	0–4 ST
Kim Hak-gwon (PRK)	0–1	Mitsuoki Hirai (JPN)	0–3 PO

=== Round 4 ===
	Score		CP
Repechage
Nurlan Koizhaiganov (KAZ)	5–0	Valentin Malutin (KGZ)	3–0 PO
Mitsuoki Hirai (JPN)		Bye	

=== Round 5 ===
	Score		CP
Repechage
Zakaria Nashed (SYR)	4–1	Mitsuoki Hirai (JPN)	3–1 PP
Nurlan Koizhaiganov (KAZ)	2–3	Yi Shanjun (CHN)	1–3 PP

=== Finals ===
	Score		CP
Bronze medal match
Zakaria Nashed (SYR)	0–11	Yi Shanjun (CHN)	0–4 ST
Gold medal match
Bakhodir Kurbanov (UZB)	3–4	Choi Sang-sun (KOR)	1–3 PP

== Final standing ==
Rank	Athlete
1st place, gold medalist(s)	Choi Sang-sun (KOR)
2nd place, silver medalist(s)	Bakhodir Kurbanov (UZB)
3rd place, bronze medalist(s)	Yi Shanjun (CHN)
4	Zakaria Nashed (SYR)
5	Nurlan Koizhaiganov (KAZ)
6	Mitsuoki Hirai (JPN)
7	Valentin Malutin (KGZ)
8	Kim Hak-gwon (PRK)
9	Norjingiin Bayarmagnai (MGL)
10	Gurbinder Singh (IND)
11	Ronilo Sabijon (PHI)
11	Surachet Kwannai (THA)
11	Döwletberdi Mamedow (TKM)
—	Parviz Zeidvand (IRI)
