= Tajikistan national Greco-Roman wrestling athletes =

Tajikistan national amateur Greco-Roman wrestling athletes represents Tajikistan in regional, continental, and world tournaments and matches sanctioned by the United World Wrestling (UWW).

== Olympics ==
Year	Venue	Medalists		
Year	Venue	Gold	Silver	Bronze
1996	Atlanta	No Greco-Roman wrestlers from Tajikistan competed		
2000	Sydney	No Tajikistani wrestlers competed		
2004	Athens	No Greco-Roman wrestlers from Tajikistan competed		
2008	Beijing	No Greco-Roman wrestlers from Tajikistan competed		
2012	London	No Greco-Roman wrestlers from Tajikistan competed		
2016	Rio de Janeiro	No Tajikistani wrestlers competed		

== World Championship ==
Year	Venue	Medalists			Team rank
Year	Venue	Gold	Silver	Bronze	Team rank
1994	Istanbul	-	-	-	-
1995	Atlanta	-	-	-	-
1997	Krasnoyarsk	-	-	-	-
1998	Tehran	-	-	-	-
1999	Ankara	-	-	-	-
2001	Sofia	-	-	-	-
2002	Tehran	-	-	-	-
2003	New York City	-	-	-	-
2005	Budapest	-	-	-	-
2006	Guangzhou	-	-	-	-
2007	Baku	—	—	-	-
2009	Herning	-	-	-	-
2010	Moscow	-	-	-	-
2011	Istanbul	-	-	-	-
2013	Budapest	-	-	-	-
2014	Tashkent	-	-	-	-
2015	Las Vegas	-	-	-	-

== Asian Games ==
Year	Venue	Medalists		
Year	Venue	Gold	Silver	Bronze
1994	Hiroshima	No Tajikistani wrestlers competed		
1998	Bangkok	No Tajikistani wrestlers competed		
2002	Busan	-	-	-
2006	Doha	-	-	—
2010	Guangzhou	-	-	—
2014	Incheon	-	-	—

== Asian Championships ==
Year	Venue	Medalists			Team rank
Year	Venue	Gold	Silver	Bronze	Team rank
1995	Manila	-	-	-	-
1996	Xiaoshan	-	-	-	-
1997	Tehran	-	-	-	-
1999	Tashkent	-	-	-	-
2000	Guilin	-	-	-	-
2001	Ulaanbaatar	-	-	-	-
2003	New Delhi	-	-	—	-
2004	Tehran	-	-	-	-
2005	Wuhan	-	-	-	-
2006	Almaty	-	-	-	-
2007	Bishkek	-	-	Murodjon Tuychiev	12th
2008	Jeju City	-	-	-	-
2009	Pattaya	-	-	-	-
2010	New Delhi	-	-	Murodjon Tuychiev	10th
2011	Tashkent	-	-	-	-
2012	Gumi	-	-	Murodjon Tuychiev	10th
2013	New Delhi	-	-	-	-
2014	Astana	-	Khusrav Obloberdiev	-	9th
2015	Doha	-	-	Murodjon Tuychiev	10th
2016	Bangkok	-	-	-	-
