= Gmina Wierzbica =

Gmina Wierzbica may refer to either of the following rural administrative districts in Poland:

- Gmina Wierzbica, Lublin Voivodeship
- Gmina Wierzbica, Masovian Voivodeship
