= Łączany =

Łączany may refer to the following places:

- Łączany, Lesser Poland Voivodeship (south Poland)
- Łączany, Masovian Voivodeship (east-central Poland)
- Łączany, Opole Voivodeship (south-west Poland)
