= Wierzbica, Radom County =

Wierzbica
- Village
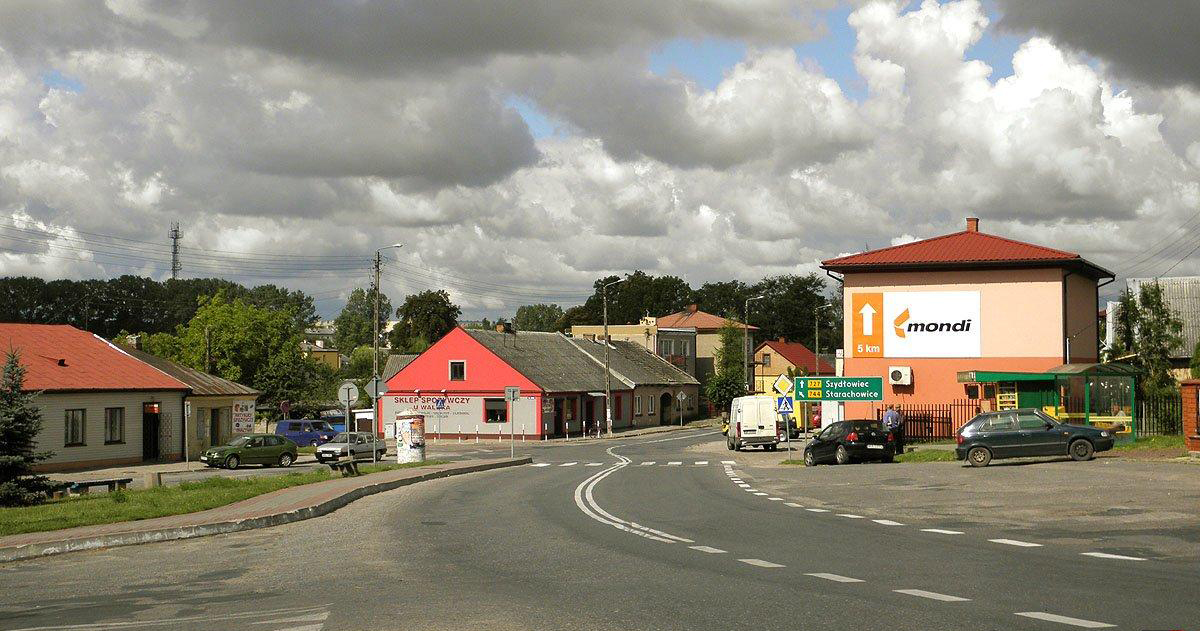
- Main street

- Location within Poland
- Coordinates: 51°15′0″N 21°4′41″E
- Country: Poland
- Voivodeship: Masovian
- County: Radom
- Gmina: Wierzbica
- Population: 1,900
- Website: www.wierzbica.net

Wierzbica [vjɛʐˈbit͡sa] is a village in Radom County, Masovian Voivodeship, in east-central Poland. It is the seat of the administrative district Gmina Wierzbica. Wierzbica belongs to the historic Polish province of Lesser Poland. The village was historically a town from 1469 to 1870, and for most of its history belonged to Lesser Poland's Sandomierz Voivodeship.

== History ==
Wierzbica was first mentioned in the year 1198, in a document issued by the Archbishop of Kraków Gedko. The bishop described the village in a document describing rules of religious tax (tithe), paid for monasteries at Miechów and Wąchock. The Order of Cistercians from Wąchock probably founded the wooden church of Saint Giles at Wierzbica, which became the center of a Roman Catholic parish. At that time, the village of Wierzbica belonged to the abbots of the Wąchock Monastery, together with Iłża and Tarczek. In 1229, Princess Grzymisława of Łuck, together with her son Bolesław V the Chaste, met at Wierzbica with Prince Konrad I of Masovia and several church leaders. Wierzbica remained the property of the Cistercians from Wąchock until the late 18th century.

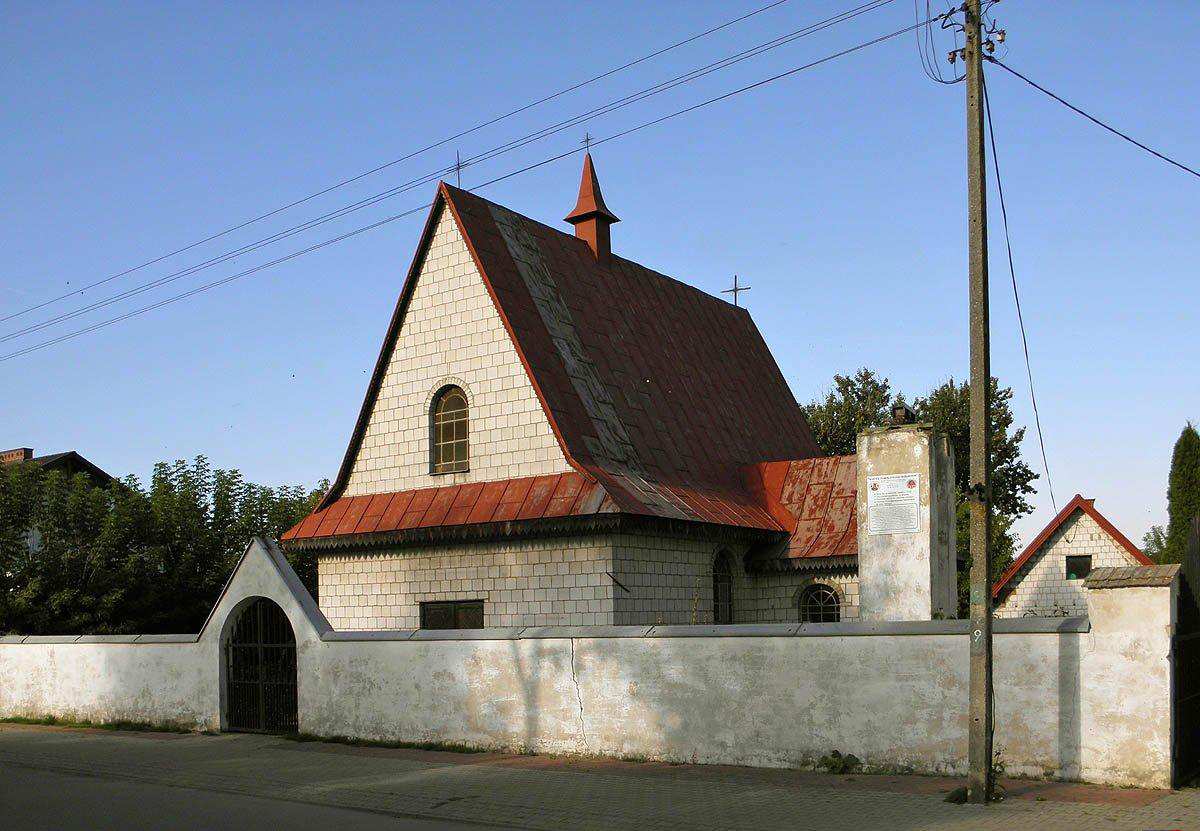
Mariavite Old Catholic Church in Wierzbica

The village received Magdeburg rights from King Kazimierz Jagiellończyk in Radom, on July 12, 1469, upon the request of Abbot Jakub from Wąchock. Residents of the newly founded town were allowed to create their own local council, and hold weekly markets on Saturdays, as well as three fairs annually (April 11, July 25 and September 14). The town quickly developed, enjoying the support of the powerful Wąchock Monastery, and by the late 15th century, had grown larger than the local urban centers of Radom and Iłża. In 1502, King Aleksander Jagiellończyk confirmed all privileges for Wierzbica, and in the mid-16th century, King Zygmunt II August extended them to the village of Rzeczków, located in the suburbs of the town. During the Polish Golden Age Wierzbica prospered, due to its location on a local merchant route Opoczno – Skrzynno - Szydłowiec – Jastrząb – Wierzbica, with additional routes to Iłża, and Skaryszew.

Until the Partitions of Poland (1795), Wierzbica remained in Sandomierz Voivodeship. In 1795-1807 it belonged to the Habsburg Empire, and in 1807 - 1815 to the Duchy of Warsaw, which became Russian-controlled Congress Poland. The town declined in the 19th century, and following the January Uprising, the Russian government reduced its status to that of a village. It remains a village to this day albeit with a medieval market square, alluding to its more illustrious past.

== Economy ==
Between 1952-1955, with Soviet cooperation, the government of the People's Republic of Poland, built the Friendship Cement Plant in Wierzbica based on Soviet technology. In 1989 the plant was renamed Wierzbica. In 1996 the plant was purchased by the French concern Lafarge in a Corporate raid. The plant was subsequently closed on October 12, 1997, despite the fact that the plant had been profitable in the years 1992-1996.

== Sights ==
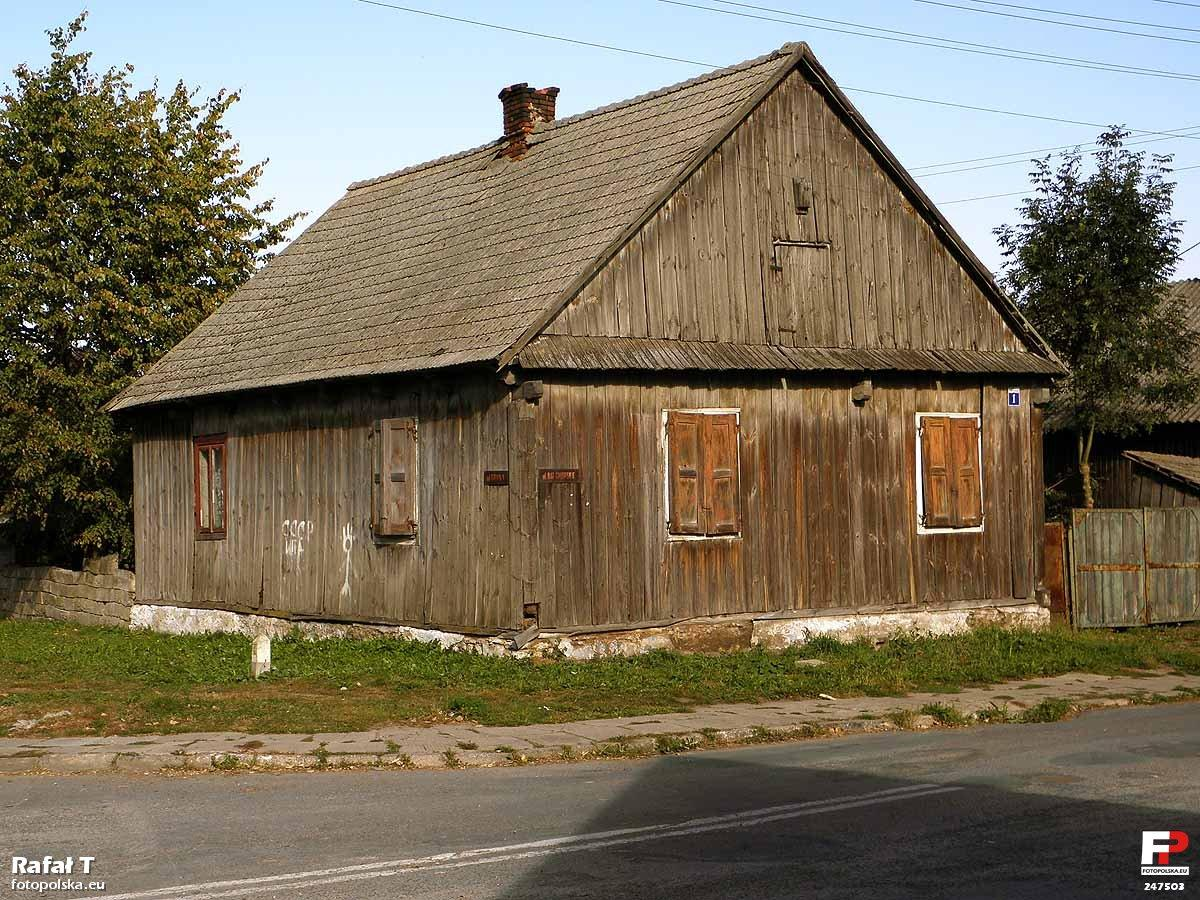
A wooden house in the village

Among points of interest in Wierzbica are the 18th century parish church of St. Stanislaus the Bishop, the 19th century cemetery, and several wooden houses from the early 19th century.

== Sport ==
The village is represented by the football club Orzeł Wierzbica. Founded as the sports club of the local cement plant in 1952, the club have won the lower league Polish Cup twice, with their highest league finish being 5th in the III liga.

== See also ==
- Kościół św. Stanisława w Wierzbicy – Church of St. Stanislaus in Wierzbica (in Polish)
