= Zalesice-Kolonia, Masovian Voivodeship =

Zalesice-Kolonia
- Village
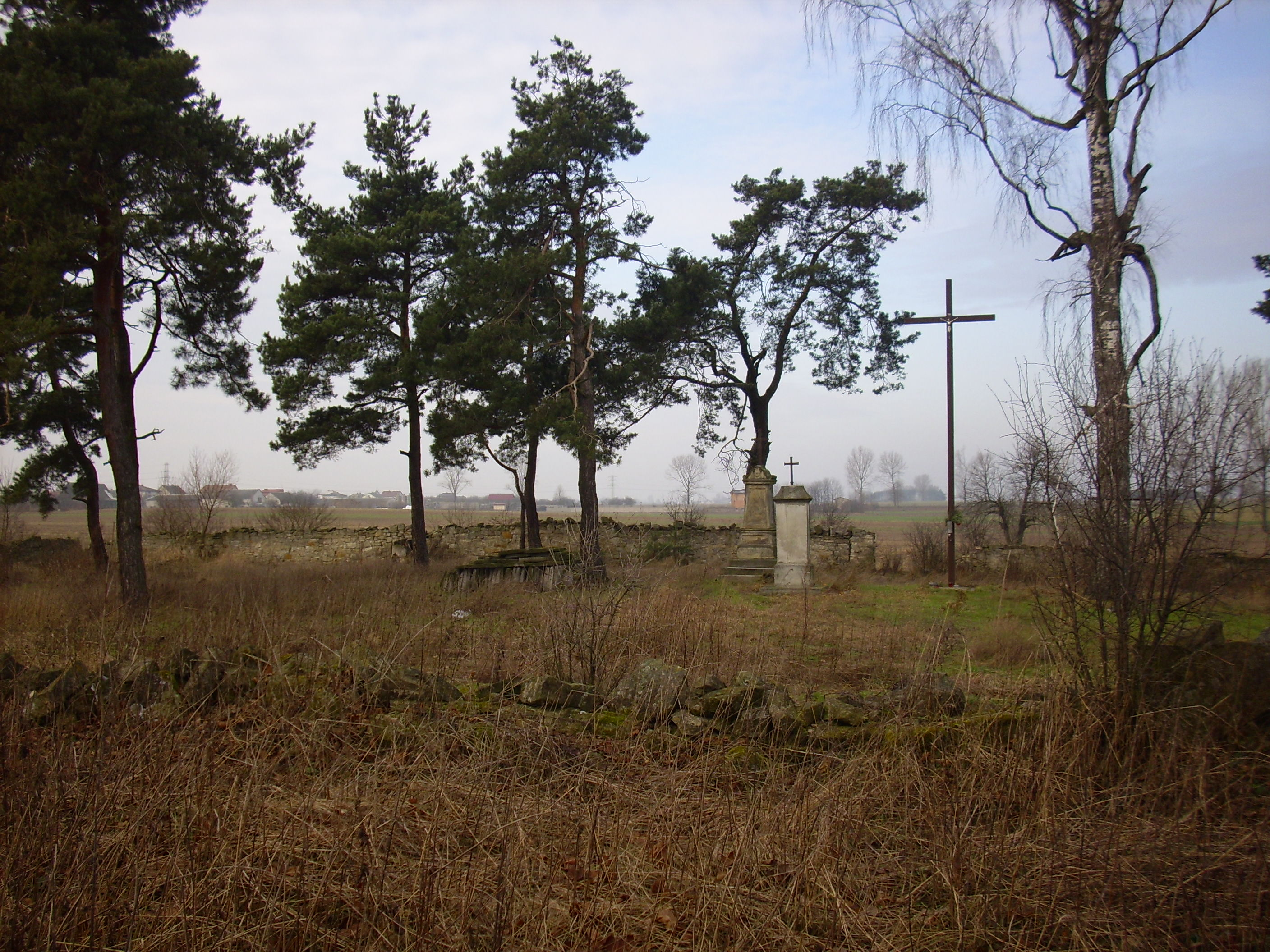
- Choleric cemetery from the 19th century in Zalesice-Kolonia

- Location within Poland
- Coordinates: 51°15′06″N 21°06′43″E
- Country: Poland
- Voivodeship: Masovian
- County: Radom
- Gmina: Wierzbica

Zalesice-Kolonia [zalɛˈɕit͡sɛ kɔˈlɔɲa] is a village in the administrative district of Gmina Wierzbica, within Radom County, Masovian Voivodeship, in east-central Poland.
