= Ivan Ivanov (wrestler, born 1968) =

Bulgarian wrestler

Personal information
- Nationality: Bulgarian
- Born: 19 December 1968 (age 57) Gurkovo, Bulgaria

Sport
- Sport: Wrestling
Medal record
Men's Greco-Roman wrestling
Representing Bulgaria
World Championships
Silver medal – second place	1994 Tampere	62 kg

Ivan Radnev Ivanov (Bulgarian: Иван Раднев Иванов; born 19 December 1968) is a Bulgarian wrestler. He competed in the men's Greco-Roman 62 kg at the 1996 Summer Olympics. He invented the Bulgarian Bag at around 2005.
