= Suliszka =

- Village
- Location within Poland
- Coordinates: 51°14′N 21°11′E
- Country: Poland
- Voivodeship: Masovian
- County: Radom
- Gmina: Wierzbica

Suliszka [suˈliʂka] is a village in the administrative district of Gmina Wierzbica, within Radom County, Masovian Voivodeship, in east-central Poland.
