= Pomorzany-Kolonia =

- Village
- Location within Poland
- Coordinates: 51°14′28″N 21°07′02″E
- Country: Poland
- Voivodeship: Masovian
- County: Radom
- Gmina: Wierzbica

Pomorzany-Kolonia [pɔmɔˈʐanɨ kɔˈlɔɲa] is a village in the administrative district of Gmina Wierzbica, within Radom County, Masovian Voivodeship, in east-central Poland.
