= 1999 Asian Wrestling Championships =

- Host city: Tashkent, Uzbekistan
- Dates: 25–30 May 1999

Champions
- Freestyle: Uzbekistan
- Greco-Roman: Uzbekistan
- Women: Japan

The 1999 Asian Wrestling Championships were held in Tashkent, Uzbekistan. The event took place from May 25 to May 30, 1999.

== Medal table ==
Rank	Nation	Gold	Silver	Bronze	Total
1	Japan	5	2	2	9
2	Uzbekistan	4	7	4	15
3	South Korea	4	0	2	6
4	Kazakhstan	3	3	2	8
5	Iran	3	1	2	6
6	Kyrgyzstan	1	3	0	4
7	North Korea	1	1	1	3
8	Chinese Taipei	1	0	2	3
9	China	0	4	4	8
10	Turkmenistan	0	1	2	3
11	India	0	0	1	1
Totals (11 entries)		22	22	22	66

== Team ranking ==
Rank	Men's freestyle		Men's Greco-Roman		Women's freestyle	
Rank	Team	Points	Team	Points	Team	Points
1	Uzbekistan	72	Uzbekistan	67	Japan	59
2	Iran	57	South Korea	64	Chinese Taipei	47
3	Kazakhstan	57	Kazakhstan	61	Turkmenistan	43
4	Japan	50	China	53	China	39
5	India	37	Iran	50	South Korea	33
6	North Korea	29	Kyrgyzstan	38	Kyrgyzstan	31
7	Kyrgyzstan	29	Japan	37	Uzbekistan	30
8	China	27	Tajikistan	24	Kazakhstan	17
9	Mongolia	22	Chinese Taipei	19		
10	Tajikistan	19	Turkmenistan	15		

== Medal summary ==
=== Men's freestyle ===
Event	Gold	Silver	Bronze
54 kg	Maulen Mamyrov; Kazakhstan	Han Yong-do; North Korea	Adkhamjon Achilov; Uzbekistan
58 kg	Ri Yong-sam; North Korea	Ruslanbek Madjinov; Kyrgyzstan	Damir Zakhartdinov; Uzbekistan
63 kg	Ali Akbar Dodangeh; Iran	Ramil Islamov; Uzbekistan	Kim Kwang-il; North Korea
69 kg	Igor Kupeev; Uzbekistan	Takahiro Wada; Japan	Sujeet Maan; India
76 kg	Ruslan Khinchagov; Uzbekistan	Nurbek Izabekov; Kyrgyzstan	Gennadiy Laliyev; Kazakhstan
85 kg	Aslan Sanakoev; Uzbekistan	Abil Sultanbekov; Kazakhstan	Tatsuo Kawai; Japan
97 kg	Alireza Heidari; Iran	Islam Bayramukov; Kazakhstan	Soslan Fraev; Uzbekistan
130 kg	Alireza Rezaei; Iran	Georgy Kaysinov; Uzbekistan	Chen Xingqiang; China

=== Men's Greco-Roman ===
Event	Gold	Silver	Bronze
54 kg	Sim Kwon-ho; South Korea	Shamsiddin Khudoyberdiev; Uzbekistan	Rakymzhan Assembekov; Kazakhstan
58 kg	Kim In-sub; South Korea	Yuriy Melnichenko; Kazakhstan	Dilshod Aripov; Uzbekistan
63 kg	Mkhitar Manukyan; Kazakhstan	Bakhodir Kurbanov; Uzbekistan	Lee Tae-ho; South Korea
69 kg	Son Sang-pil; South Korea	Ruslan Biktyakov; Uzbekistan	Yi Shanjun; China
76 kg	Kim Jin-soo; South Korea	Yury Vitt; Uzbekistan	Takamitsu Katayama; Japan
85 kg	Raatbek Sanatbayev; Kyrgyzstan	Zafarkhon Achilov; Uzbekistan	Mohammad Nikounahad; Iran
97 kg	Sergey Matviyenko; Kazakhstan	Feng Fuming; China	Mehdi Sharabiani; Iran
130 kg	Shuhrat Sadiev; Uzbekistan	Alireza Gharibi; Iran	Zhao Hailin; China

=== Women's freestyle ===
Event	Gold	Silver	Bronze
46 kg	Miyu Yamamoto; Japan	Yin Min; China	Galina Ataýewa; Turkmenistan
51 kg	Atsuko Shinomura; Japan	Li Xiaoming; China	Wu Li-chuan; Chinese Taipei
56 kg	Yuka Mitadera; Japan	Cao Haiying; China	Lee Na-lae; South Korea
62 kg	Ari Suzuki; Japan	Olesýa Nazarenko; Turkmenistan	Meng Lili; China
68 kg	Sha Ling-li; Chinese Taipei	Reiko Sumiya; Japan	Nadežda Želtakowa; Turkmenistan
75 kg	Taeko Tomioka; Japan	Yana Panova; Kyrgyzstan	Wu Huei-li; Chinese Taipei

== Participating nations ==
201 competitors from 14 nations competed.

- China (19)
- Chinese Taipei (22)
- India (8)
- Iran (16)
- Japan (21)
- Kazakhstan (20)
- Kyrgyzstan (17)
- Mongolia (6)
- North Korea (4)
- Pakistan (3)
- South Korea (19)
- Tajikistan (12)
- Turkmenistan (12)
- Uzbekistan (22)
