= 2002 European Wrestling Championships =

- Host city: Baku, Azerbaijan Greco-Roman; Seinäjoki, Finland Freestyle
- Dates: 13 - 14 April 2002; 3 - 4 May 2002

Champions
- Freestyle: Russia
- Greco-Roman: Russia
- Women: Russia

The 2002 European Wrestling Championships were held in the men's Freestyle in Baku and Greco-Romane style, and the women's freestyle in Seinäjoki.

== Medal table ==
Rank	Nation	Gold	Silver	Bronze	Total
1	Russia	10	2	4	16
2	Turkey	3	0	2	5
3	Georgia	1	3	1	5
4	Sweden	1	3	0	4
5	Ukraine	1	1	3	5
6	Azerbaijan	1	1	1	3
6	Bulgaria	1	1	1	3
6	Poland	1	1	1	3
9	Hungary	1	1	0	2
10	France	1	0	2	3
11	Belarus	0	3	1	4
11	Germany	0	3	1	4
13	Norway	0	1	1	2
14	Moldova	0	1	0	1
15	Finland	0	0	2	2
16	Israel	0	0	1	1
Totals (16 entries)		21	21	21	63

== Medal summary ==
=== Men's freestyle ===
Event	Gold	Silver	Bronze
55 kg	Nazim Alidjanov; Azerbaijan	Ghenadie Tulbea; Moldova	Alexandr Kontoyev; Russia
60 kg	Arif Kama; Turkey	Vasyl Fedoryshyn; Ukraine	Arif Abdullayev; Azerbaijan
66 kg	Zaur Botayev; Russia	Elman Asgarov; Azerbaijan	Nikolay Paslar; Bulgaria
74 kg	Árpád Ritter; Hungary	Beibulat Musaev; Belarus	Magomed Isagadzhiyev; Russia
84 kg	Sazhid Sazhidov; Russia	Beibulat Musaev; Belarus	Revaz Mindorashvili; Georgia
96 kg	Kuramagomed Kuramagomedov; Russia	Eldar Kurtanidze; Georgia	Fatih Çakıroğlu; Turkey
120 kg	David Musulbes; Russia	Davit Otiasvili; Georgia	Zekeriya Güçlü; Turkey

=== Men's Greco-Roman ===
Event	Gold	Silver	Bronze
55 kg	Renat Bikkinin; Russia	Tanio Tenev; Bulgaria	Dariusz Jabłoński; Poland
60 kg	Armen Nazaryan; Bulgaria	Rustem Mambetov; Russia	Djamel Ainaoui; France
66 kg	Şeref Eroğlu; Turkey	Manuchar Kvirkvelia; Georgia	Michael Beilin; Israel
74 kg	Badri Khasaia; Georgia	Varteres Samurgashev; Russia	Marko Yli-Hannuksela; Finland
84 kg	Hamza Yerlikaya; Turkey	Ara Abrahamian; Sweden	Viachaslau Makaranka; Belarus
96 kg	Gogi Koguashvili; Russia	Sergey Lishtvan; Belarus	Davyd Saldadze; Ukraine
120 kg	Yury Patrikeyev; Russia	Mihály Deák-Bárdos; Hungary	Juha Ahokas; Finland

=== Women's freestyle ===
Event	Gold	Silver	Bronze
48 kg	Inga Karamchakova; Russia	Brigitte Wagner; Germany	Angélique Berthenet; France
51 kg	Olga Smirnova; Russia	Ida Hellström; Sweden	Inesa Rebar; Ukraine
55 kg	Tetyana Lazareva; Ukraine	Ida-Theres Karlsson-Nerell; Sweden	Gudrun Høie; Norway
59 kg	Sara Eriksson; Sweden	Monika Michalik; Poland	Christina Oertli; Germany
63 kg	Małgorzata Bassa-Roguska; Poland	Lene Aanes; Norway	Daria Nazarova; Russia
67 kg	Lise Legrand; France	Anita Schätzle; Germany	Anna Shamova; Russia
72 kg	Svetlana Martinenko; Russia	Nina Englich; Germany	Svetlana Saenko; Ukraine
