= Ruda Wielka =

- Village
- Location within Poland
- Coordinates: 51°18′N 21°4′E
- Country: Poland
- Voivodeship: Masovian
- County: Radom
- Gmina: Wierzbica
- Population: 1,300

Ruda Wielka [ˈruda ˈvjɛlka] is a village in the administrative district of Gmina Wierzbica, within Radom County, Masovian Voivodeship, in east-central Poland.
