= Polany-Kolonia =

- Village
- Location within Poland
- Coordinates: 51°13′44″N 21°05′30″E
- Country: Poland
- Voivodeship: Masovian
- County: Radom
- Gmina: Wierzbica

Polany-Kolonia [pɔˈlanɨ kɔˈlɔɲa] is a village in the administrative district of Gmina Wierzbica, within Radom County, Masovian Voivodeship, in east-central Poland.
