= Bulgarian bag =

Exercise equipment

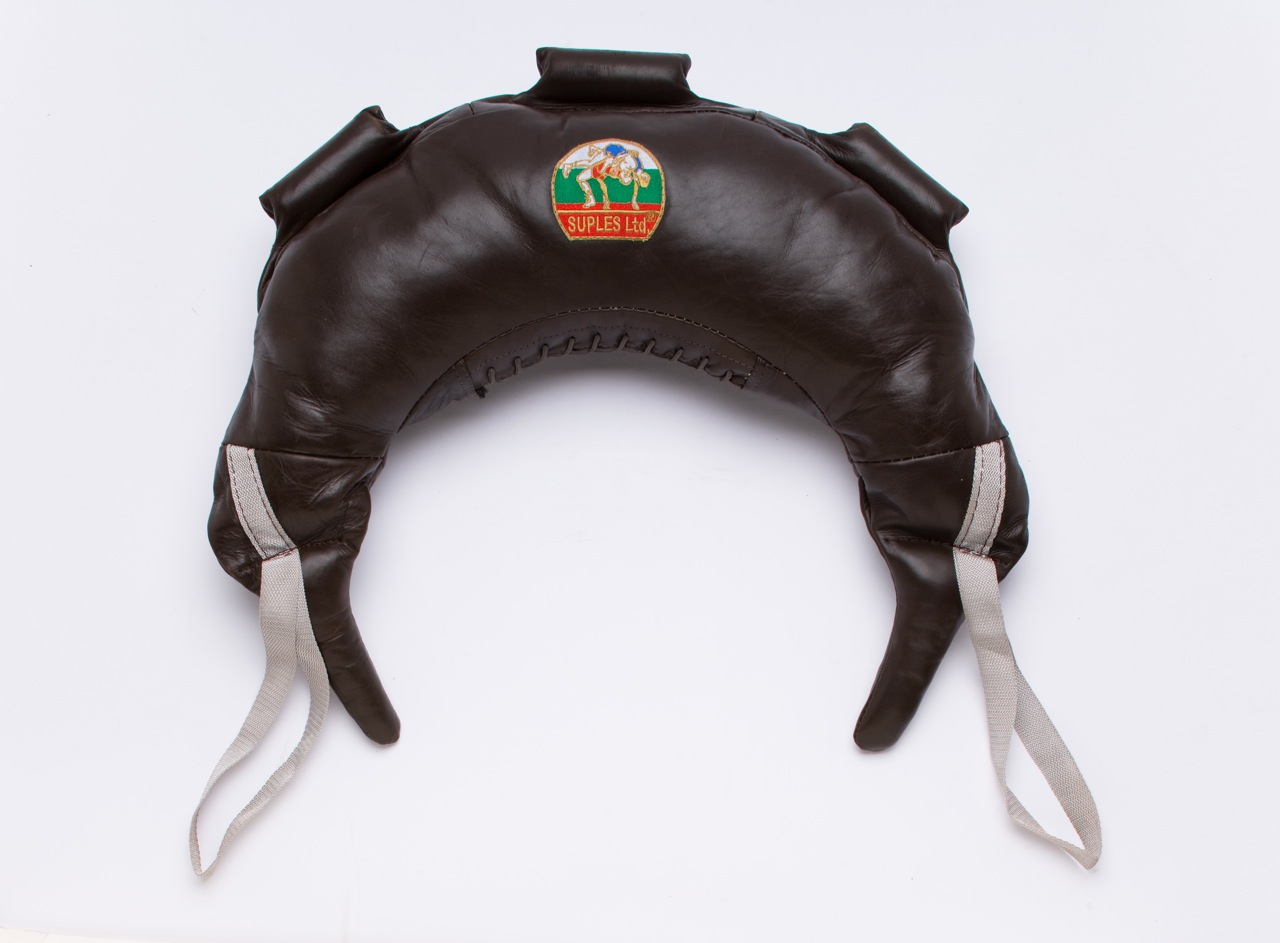
A 17 kg (37 lbs) Bulgarian bag.

The Bulgarian bag (Bulgarian: Българска торба / Български чувал), also known as the Bulgarian training bag (Bulgarian: Българска тренировъчна торба), is a crescent-shaped piece of exercise equipment used in strength training, plyometric weight training, cardiovascular training, and general physical fitness. The bags are made of leather or canvas and filled with sand; they weigh from 6 pounds (2.7 kg) to 84 pounds (38 kg) and have flexible handles to allow for both upper and lower body training, and for building grip strength.

== History ==
The Bulgarian Bag was invented by Ivan Ivanov at around 2005. Ivanov, a former Bulgarian Olympic athlete, was working as a U.S. Olympic wrestling coach at the Olympic training center in Marquette, Michigan, and was looking for a training tool that would allow his wrestlers to improve explosive actions and dynamic movements involved in pushing, twisting, swinging, pulling, bending, rotating, squatting, lunging, and throwing.

Ivanov was inspired by the tradition of shepherds performing strength acts with sheep and goats on street fairs in his homeland, Bulgaria. The shepherds were often forced to carry lambs and weak sheep around their shoulders when they were wandering with their herds, and were showing off their strength at festivals. Ivanov based the design of his tool on the body of an ovine and saw its use as a modern interpretation of the old tradition.

Although the Bulgarian bag was initially designed for Olympic class wrestlers, it came to be adopted by fitness trainers and professional athletes for its ability to increase muscular endurance and make weight training more versatile. One of the first advocates of the Bulgarian Bag outside the Olympic wrestling circuit was fitness specialist and retired Navy SEAL Stephen Nave. Along with Ivan Ivanov they formed the International Bulgarian Bag Confederation to educate the public and offer advanced instruction to individual consumers, personal trainers and fitness establishments.

== Construction ==
The exterior of Bulgarian bags is made out of leather or heavy-duty canvas. The leather bags are handmade in Bulgaria and mostly constructed of goat skin. Because goat skin is finer in thickness and the follicles are shallow in the skin, there is less compromise in the strength of the hide when compared to other leathers. The interior is filled with individually wrapped and weighed sand packets and padded with wool to form a smooth rounded contour. Once filled, the main seam is closed using a heavy gauge soft nylon.

The exterior of the bag consists of three kinds of handles and straps to allow for multiple types of exercises with different grips:

- The main handles are the two hold points which taper out toward the end of the bag and are used for swinging and spinning motions.
- The exterior handles are three tube-like protrusions wrapped in goat skin that sit on the outer top of the bag; the center handle is set between the two outer handles. The exterior handles are primarily used for grip strength and upper body exercises.
- The third elements are called 'straps' and are two looped nylon straps sewn directly to the bag’s exterior. They are approximately 12 inches long and are used to stabilize the bag on the shoulders during lower body workouts, and as grasping handles for arm exercises.

Self-made Bulgarian Bags can be constructed out of automobile inner-tubes or children's ring float toys.

== Variations ==
Depending on a person's size and level of physical fitness, Bulgarian Bags are manufactured in different sizes and weights:

Weight	Strap color	Recommendation
5.0 kg (11 lb)	Yellow	Athletes up to 50 kg (110 lb)
7.7 kg (17 lb)	Green	Athletes 50 to 68 kg (110 to 150 lb)
12 kg (26 lb)	Red	Athletes 68 to 86 kg (150 to 190 lb)
17 kg (37 lb)	Silver	Athletes 95 to 113 kg (209 to 249 lb)
23 kg (50 lb)	Brown	Advanced Athletes

== Use ==
The bag can be used as a free weight in various simple and dynamic movements like pushing, spinning, swinging and rotating, and added to one's body weight to perform jumps, squats, push-ups, pull-ups and power crunches. Many sample workout routines have been posted on the Internet.

== Fitness advantages ==
The Bulgarian bag strengthens and increases the muscular endurance of the grip, wrists, arms, shoulders, back, legs, and rotational muscles. It also aids in building core musculature, coordination, and improving overall shoulder and joint mobility. Because of its shape, material and construction, Bulgarian bag can be used to develop quickness and agility in ways which solid iron weights and circuit machines cannot.

=== Variable angular resistance ===
The Bulgarian bag breaks the tradition with static resistance devices such as free weights which adhere to a singular plane of motion (i.e. creating resistance by pushing or pulling weight away from and toward the body), by using accelerating and deceleration movements to swing and spin the bag at various angles to athlete's body. This results in the Bulgarian bag's ability to increase overall body strength and agility.

The multi-angular approach to gravity, momentum and inertia in physical exercise has been termed Variable Angular Resistance training in some use.

=== Aerobic effect ===
After cardiovascular exercise or weight training, the body continues to need oxygen at a higher rate than before the exercise began. High intensity bouts of exercise with the Bulgarian bag increase metabolic rates higher than traditional weight training and cardiovascular activity because the exercise includes both weight training and fast dynamic movement.

Originally referred to as oxygen debt, this post exercise aerobic effect was first hypothesized by A.V. Hill and H. Lupton in 1922. They theorized that the body needs to replace the oxygen used by working muscles during mild to intense bouts of exercise. More recently, researchers have used the term 'excess post-exercise oxygen consumption' to describe the different events that occur as the body restores itself to homeostasis, or rest. The body’s metabolic rate will be raised for a longer period post- exercise from high intensity bouts of exercise. Depending on the level of stress and intensity of exercise, metabolic increase can be seen for up to 18–24 hours.

== Safety considerations ==
Exercises with Bulgarian bags, like any other plyometric shock-training exercises, involve an increased risk of injury due to the large forces that are generated during acceleration, and should only be performed by well-conditioned individuals or under supervision. For more information on risks involved in plyometric training, see safety considerations in plyometrics.

Because the handles of the Bulgarian bag are flexible and not rigidly fixed to the body of the equipment, it is harder for an athlete to transfer the weight of the equipment to his or her forearm and arm muscles than with traditional iron weights, and more load is carried by athlete's wrists. The use of wrist wraps may therefore be advisable for people with weaker wrists to provide additional support.

For general information about the effects of physical exercise on human body and the physiological processes involved, see exercise physiology.

== See also ==
- Barbell
- Dumbbell
- Kettlebell
- Exercise equipment
- Weight training
- Strength training
- Resistance training
- Plyometric training
