= Vitaly Zhuk =

Belarusian wrestler

Personal information
- Nationality: Belarusian
- Born: 3 July 1973 (age 53) Hrodna, Belarusian SSR

Sport
- Sport: Wrestling
Medal record
European Championships
Bronze medal – third place	2000 Moscow	-63 kg
Silver medal – second place	2004 Haparanda	-66 kg

Vitaly Zhuk (born 3 July 1973) is a Belarusian wrestler. He competed in the men's Greco-Roman 63 kg at the 2000 Summer Olympics.
