= Marco Sánchez (wrestler) =

Puerto Rican wrestler

Personal information
- Nationality: Puerto Rican
- Born: 18 January 1970 (age 56)

Sport
- Sport: Wrestling

Marco Sánchez (born 18 January 1970) is a Puerto Rican wrestler. He competed in the men's Greco-Roman 62 kg at the 1996 Summer Olympics.
