= 1994 European Espoirs Wrestling Championships =

- Host city: Turkey, Istanbul(Greco-Roman); Finland Kourtane(Freestyle)
- Dates: 27 – 28 July 1994; 4 – 5 August 1994

The 1994 European Espoirs Wrestling Championships was the 12th edition of European Espoirs Wrestling Championships were held in the men's Freestyle style in Kourtane Finland 4 – 5 August 1994; the Greco-Roman style in Istanbul Turkey 27 – 28 July 1994. It was the last tournament named of Espoirs.

== Medal table ==
Rank	Nation	Gold	Silver	Bronze	Total
1	Russia	4	5	8	17
2	Turkey	4	3	0	7
3	Ukraine	3	2	4	9
4	Armenia	3	1	0	4
5	Hungary	2	1	1	4
6	Germany	2	0	1	3
7	Georgia	1	1	2	4
8	Bulgaria	1	1	1	3
9	Belarus	0	2	1	3
10	Poland	0	1	1	2
11	Greece	0	1	0	1
11	Romania	0	1	0	1
11	Switzerland	0	1	0	1
14	Lithuania	0	0	1	1
Totals (14 entries)		20	20	20	60

== Medal summary ==
=== Men's freestyle ===
Event	Gold	Silver	Bronze
48 kg	Witali Railean; Germany	Beyhan Gülfiliz; Turkey	Wiktor Lizen; Ukraine
52 kg	Tamazi Kuloshvili; Georgia	Mourad Ramazanov; Russia	Károly Kiss; Hungary
57 kg	Aram Margaryan; Armenia	Harun Doğan; Turkey	Leonid Chuchunov; Russia
62 kg	Elbrus Tedeyev; Ukraine	David Pogosyan; Georgia	Rasul Karaev; Russia
68 kg	Igor Kupeev; Russia	Orest Skobelski; Ukraine	Andre Toch; Germany
74 kg	Sevi Aldimov; Bulgaria	Buvaisar Saitiev; Russia	Andsor Tempotov; Ukraine
82 kg	Eldar Assanov; Ukraine	Stanislav Albegov; Russia	Michał Stanisławski; Poland
90 kg	Mesut Okçu; Germany	Mirko Silian; Switzerland	Ričardas Pauliukonis; Lithuania
100 kg	Eduard Togoev; Ukraine	Krasimir Kochev; Bulgaria	Alan Batyrov; Russia
130 kg	Vadim Tasoyev; Russia	Sergey Pryadun; Ukraine	Viacheslav Pirski; Belarus

=== Men's Greco-Roman ===
Event	Gold	Silver	Bronze
48 kg	Tigran Mkrtchyan; Armenia	Imre Szarka; Hungary	Dzhalil Saizutdinov; Russia
52 kg	Armen Nazaryan; Armenia	Ercan Yıldız; Turkey	Oleg Nemchenko; Russia
57 kg	Şeref Eroğlu; Turkey	Armen Mkrtchyan; Armenia	Maxim Starodubtsev; Russia
62 kg	Juri Solomatin; Russia	Bica Gheorghe; Romania	Giorgi Pretsuashvili; Georgia
68 kg	Mecnun Güler; Turkey	Alexios Kolitsopoulos; Greece	Mainbek Khambazarov; Russia
74 kg	Nazmi Avluca; Turkey	Asker Talok; Russia	Kvitsha Bichinashvili; Georgia
82 kg	Hamza Yerlikaya; Turkey	Vyacheslav Makarenko; Belarus	Alexander Maldakhov; Russia
90 kg	Sergey Tsvir; Russia	Marek Sitnik; Poland	Alexander Rezemez; Ukraine
100 kg	Miklos Nemeth; Hungary	Vladimir Borman; Russia	Ruslan Kostenko; Ukraine
130 kg	Csaba Gegeny; Hungary	Sergej Silitsch; Belarus	Nikolai Dankov; Bulgaria
