= Rzeczków, Masovian Voivodeship =

Rzeczków
- Village
- Location within Poland
- Coordinates: 51°17′N 21°4′E
- Country: Poland
- Voivodeship: Masovian
- County: Radom
- Gmina: Wierzbica

Rzeczków [ˈʐɛt͡ʂkuf] is a village in the administrative district of Gmina Wierzbica, within Radom County, Masovian Voivodeship, in east-central Poland.
