= Pomorzany, Masovian Voivodeship =

Pomorzany
- Village
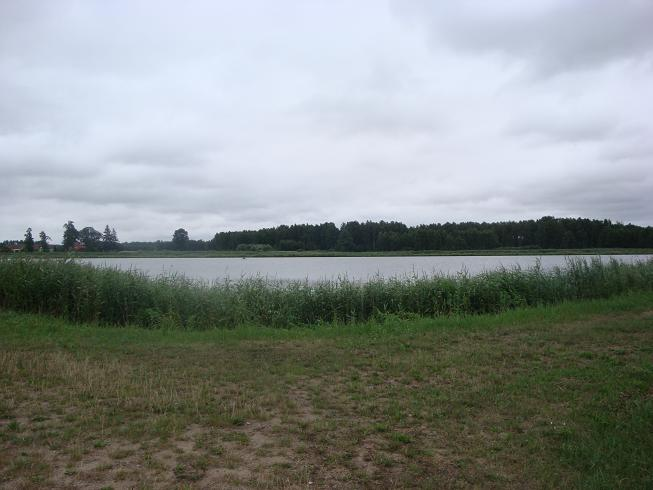

- Location within Poland
- Coordinates: 51°14′N 21°9′E
- Country: Poland
- Voivodeship: Masovian
- County: Radom
- Gmina: Wierzbica

Pomorzany [pɔmɔˈʐanɨ] is a village in the administrative district of Gmina Wierzbica, within Radom County, Masovian Voivodeship, in east-central Poland.
