= Błędów, Radom County =

Błędów
- Village
- Location within Poland
- Coordinates: 51°17′N 21°5′E
- Country: Poland
- Voivodeship: Masovian
- County: Radom
- Gmina: Wierzbica

Błędów [ˈbwɛnduf] is a village in the administrative district of Gmina Wierzbica, within Radom County, Masovian Voivodeship, in east-central Poland.
