= Ainsley Robinson =

Canadian martial artist

Ainsley Robinson (born December 6, 1971) is a Canadian mixed martial artist and former Olympic wrestler. He also owns Toronto Top Team Fitness/Martial Arts located in Scarborough, Ontario.

== Olympic career ==
Born in Oshawa, Ontario, Robinson competed in the 1996 Olympics in the Men's Greco-Roman 62 kg where he recorded losses to David Zuniga and Choi Sang-Sun, ultimately placing 18th in the event.

== MMA career ==
Robinson has competed in the Bellator Fighting Championships (losing to Chad Laprise) and King of the Cage.
