= Łączany, Masovian Voivodeship =

Łączany
- Village
- Location within Poland
- Coordinates: 51°15′N 21°10′E
- Country: Poland
- Voivodeship: Masovian
- County: Radom
- Gmina: Wierzbica

Łączany [wɔnˈt͡ʂanɨ] is a village in the administrative district of Gmina Wierzbica, within Radom County, Masovian Voivodeship, in east-central Poland.
