= Rzeczków-Kolonia =

Village in Gmina Wierzbica, Poland

- Village
- Location within Poland
- Coordinates: 51°15′13″N 21°02′07″E
- Country: Poland
- Voivodeship: Masovian
- County: Radom
- Gmina: Wierzbica

Rzeczków-Kolonia [ˈʐɛt͡ʂkuf kɔˈlɔɲa] is a village in the administrative district of Gmina Wierzbica, within Radom County, Masovian Voivodeship, in east-central Poland.
