= Yassine Djakrir =

Algerian wrestler

Personal information
- Nationality: Algerian
- Born: 6 December 1973 (age 52)

Sport
- Sport: Wrestling

Yassine Djakrir (born 6 December 1973) is an Algerian wrestler. He competed in the men's Greco-Roman 63 kg at the 2000 Summer Olympics.
