= Polany, Masovian Voivodeship =

Polany
- Village
- Location within Poland
- Coordinates: 51°14′N 21°7′E
- Country: Poland
- Voivodeship: Masovian
- County: Radom
- Gmina: Wierzbica
- Time zone: UTC+1 (CET)
  - Summer (DST): UTC+2 (CEST)

Polany [pɔˈlanɨ] is a village in the administrative district of Gmina Wierzbica, within Radom County, Masovian Voivodeship, in east-central Poland.

Five Polish citizens were murdered by Nazi Germany in the village during World War II.
