= David Zuniga =

American wrestler (born 1968)

Personal information
- Born: David Santos Zuniga; March 1, 1968 (age 58) Worland, Wyoming, U.S.
- Height: 5 ft 5 in (165 cm)
- Weight: 62 kg (137 lb)

Sport
- Country: United States
- Sport: Wrestling
- Event: Greco-Roman
- College team: Minnesota
- Club: Minnesota Storm
- Team: USA
Medal record
Representing the United States
Men's Greco-Roman wrestling
Pan American Games
Silver medal – second place	1999 Winnipeg	69 kg
Bronze medal – third place	1995 Mar del Plata	62 kg
Collegiate Wrestling
Representing the Minnesota Golden Gophers
NCAA Division I Championships
Silver medal – second place	1990 College Park	134 lb

David Santos Zuniga (born March 1, 1968) is a retired wrestler that competed in the 1996 Olympics and several FILA Wrestling World Championships.

== International career ==
Zuniga placed 4th at the 1994 World Wrestling Championships and also competed at the 1995 World Wrestling Championships, 1997 World Wrestling Championships, and 1999 World Wrestling Championships.

Zuniga was a bronze medalist at the 1995 Pan American Games and a silver medalist at the 1999 Pan American Games.

At the 1996 Olympics in the Men's Greco-Roman 62 kg Zuniga defeated Ainsley Robinson in the first round before losing to Ivan Ivanov and Sergey Martynov.
