= Michael Beilin =

Israeli Greco-Roman wrestler

Michael Beilin מיכאל ביילין
Personal information
- Nationality: Israel
- Born: April 25, 1976 (age 50) Perm, Russia
- Height: 5 ft 6.5 in (169 cm)
- Weight: 139 lb (63 kg)

Sport
- Sport: Wrestling
- Style: Greco-Roman

Achievements and titles
- Olympic finals: 15th (2000)
- World finals: (bronze) (1999, 2001)
- Regional finals: (bronze) (2002)
Medal record
Men's Greco-Roman wrestling
Representing Israel
World Championships
| Bronze medal – third place | 1999 Athens | 63 kg |
| Bronze medal – third place | 2001 Patras | 63 kg |
European Championships
| Bronze medal – third place | 2002 Baku | 66 kg |

Michael Beilin (Hebrew: מיכאל ביילין; born April 25, 1976) is an Israeli former Olympic Greco-Roman wrestler.

== Early life ==
Beilin is from Perm, Russia, and is Jewish. He made aliyah (emigrated to Israel) with his parents in 1994. He served in the Israel Defense Forces.

== Wrestling career ==
He started wrestling at the age of 8. His sports club was Hapoel Tel Aviv, in Tel Aviv, Israel, and he was coached by Nick Zagrintzki.

At the 1996 European Championship: 62.0 kg Greco-Roman, he came in 12th. At the 1997 World Wrestling Championships: 63.0 kg Greco-Roman, he came in 4th. At the 1998 World Wrestling Championships: 63.0 kg. Greco-Roman, he came in 13th.

At the 1999 World Wrestling Championships: 63.0 kg Greco-Roman in Athens, he won the bronze medal, and qualified for the Olympic Games.

He competed for Israel at the 2000 Summer Olympics, at the age of 24, in Sydney, Australia, in Greco-Roman Wrestling--Men's Lightweight (63 kg), and came in 15th. Ranked Number 3 in the world before the Olympics, he won his first match against Vitaly Chuk of Belarus, but lost in the elimination pool to Bakhodir Kurbanov of Uzbekistan. When he competed in the Olympics he was 5 ft 6.5 in (169 cm) tall, and weighed 139 lb (63 kg).

At the 2001 World Wrestling Championships: 63.0 kg Greco-Roman, he won the bronze medal. At the 2001 Maccabiah Games he won the gold medal at 69 kg. At the 2002 European Championship: 66.0 kg Greco-Roman, he won the bronze medal. At the 2006 European Championship: 66.0 kg Greco-Roman, he came in 19th.
