= Gmina Wierzbica, Masovian Voivodeship =

Gmina Wierzbica Wierzbica Commune
- Gmina
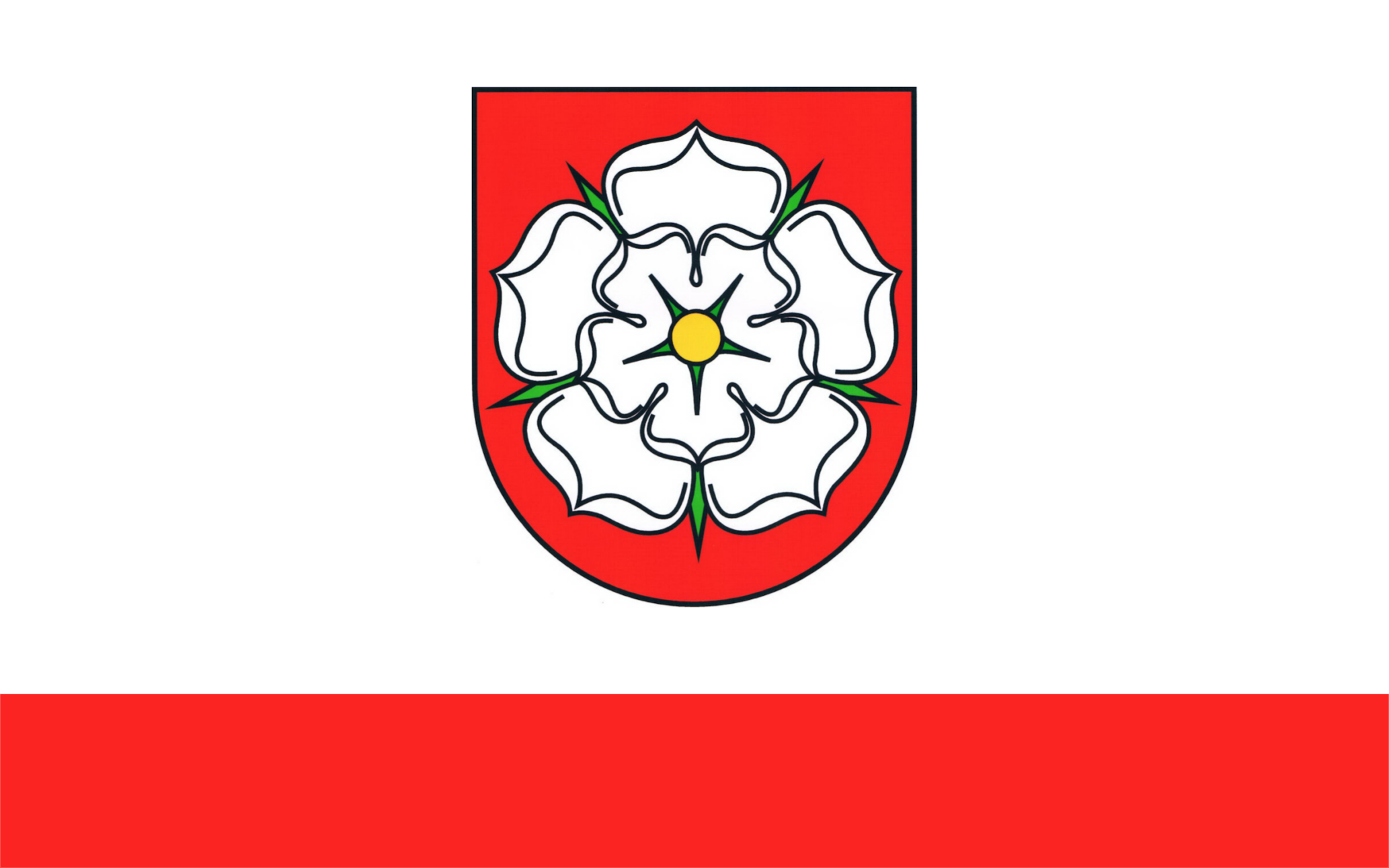
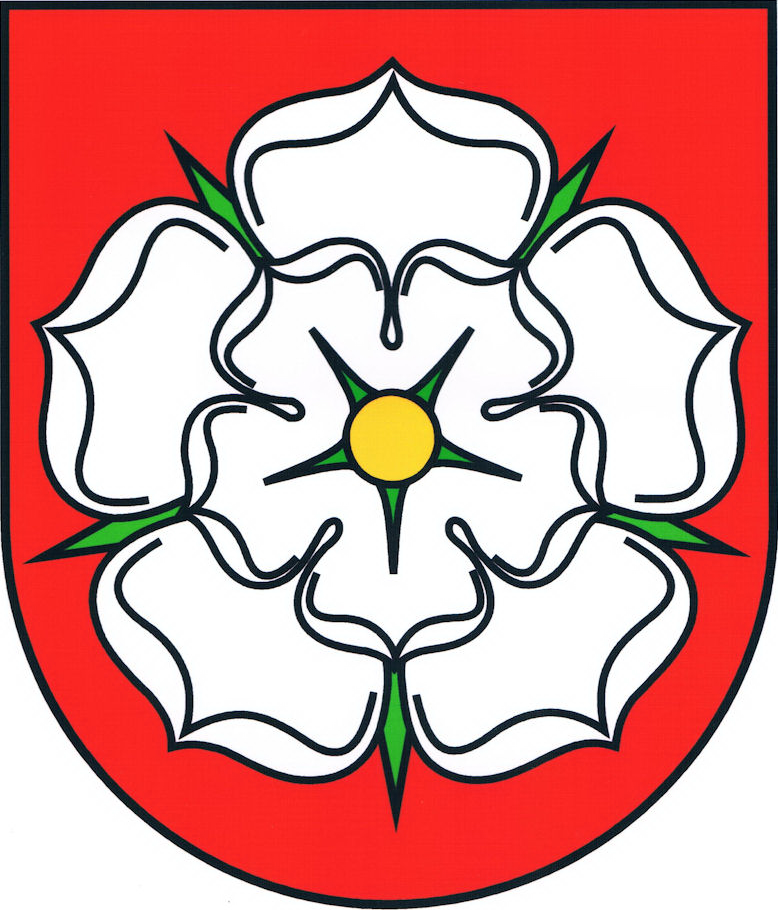
- Flag Coat of arms
- Interactive map of Gmina Wierzbica
- Coordinates (Wierzbica): 51°15′0″N 21°4′41″E
- Country: Poland
- Voivodeship: Masovian
- County: Radom County
- Seat: Wierzbica

Area
  - Total: 93.97 km^{2} (36.28 sq mi)

Population (2006)
  - Total: 10,093
  - Density: 107.4/km^{2} (278.2/sq mi)
- Website: http://www.wierzbica.pl

Gmina Wierzbica is a rural gmina (administrative district) in Radom County, Masovian Voivodeship, in east-central Poland. Its seat is the village of Wierzbica, which lies approximately 18 kilometres (11 mi) south of Radom and 108 km (67 mi) south of Warsaw.

The gmina covers an area of 93.97 square kilometres (36.3 sq mi), and as of 2006 its total population is 10,093.

== Villages ==
Gmina Wierzbica contains the villages and settlements of Błędów, Dąbrówka Warszawska, Łączany, Podgórki, Polany, Polany-Kolonia, Pomorzany, Pomorzany-Kolonia, Ruda Wielka, Rzeczków, Rzeczków-Kolonia, Stanisławów, Suliszka, Wierzbica, Wierzbica-Kolonia, Zalesice and Zalesice-Kolonia.

== Neighbouring gminas ==
Gmina Wierzbica is bordered by the gminas of Iłża, Jastrząb, Kowala, Mirów, Mirzec, Orońsko and Skaryszew.
