= Usama Aziz =

Swedish mixed martial arts fighter

- Born: Usama Aziz; 31 August 1972 (age 54); Gothenburg, Sweden
- Nationality: Swedish
- Height: 5 ft 6 in (1.68 m)
- Weight: 145 lb (66 kg; 10.4 st)
- Division: Featherweight
- Style: Wrestling
- Stance: Orthodox
- Fighting out of: Stockholm, Sweden
- Team: Alstar Training Center; Hilti NHB
- Years active: 1988-2004 (Wrestling); 2005–2013 (MMA)

Mixed martial arts record
- Total: 11
- Wins: 6
- By knockout: 2
- By decision: 4
- Losses: 3
- By submission: 2
- By decision: 1
- Draws: 1
- No contests: 1

Other information
- Mixed martial arts record from Sherdog

Usama Aziz (born 31 August 1972), also known as Sami Aziz, is a Swedish retired wrestler and mixed martial artist. He competed at the 1992 Summer Olympics and the 1996 Summer Olympics. He finished 5th in the 1992 European Championships and another 5th place in the 1995 World Championships, both in the style of Greco-Roman. His mixed martial arts career started in 2005. He competed in organisations such as Bellator MMA and Bodog Fight. He retired in 2013, following a victory over former UFC Lightweight Champion Jens Pulver.

== Championships and accomplishments ==
=== Amateur wrestling ===
- United World Wrestling - European Championships
  - 1988 Cadets European Championship Freestyle (silver) (-55 kg)
  - 1989 Juniors European Championship Greco-Roman (silver) (-54 kg)
  - 1992 Espoir European Championship Greco-Roman (silver) (-62 kg)
- Nordic Wrestling Association
  - 1990 Junior Nordic Championships Greco-Roman (gold) (-57 kg)
  - 1991 Junior Nordic Championships Greco-Roman (bronze) (-62 kg)
  - 1992 Junior Nordic Championships Greco-Roman (gold) (-62 kg)
  - 1993 Baltic Sea Games Greco-Roman (bronze) (-62 kg)
  - 1994 Nordic Championships Greco-Roman (bronze) (-62 kg)
  - 1996 Nordic Championships Greco-Roman (gold) (-62 kg)
- Swedish Wrestling Federation
  - 1990 Swedish National Championships Freestyle (gold) (Bantamweight)
  - 1992 Swedish National Championships Greco-Roman (gold) (Featherweight)
  - 2002 Swedish National Championships Greco-Roman (gold) (Lightweight)

=== Amateur Boxing ===
- Swedish Boxing Federation
  - 1998 Swedish National Championship (bronze)
  - 1999 Swedish National Championship (bronze)
  - 2000 Swedish National Championship (bronze)
  - 2001 Swedish National Championship (bronze)
  - 2006 Swedish National Championship (bronze)

== Mixed martial arts record ==
Professional record breakdown
11 matches	6 wins	3 losses
By knockout	2	0
By submission	0	2
By decision	4	1
Draws	1	
No contests	1	

Res.	Record	Opponent	Method	Event	Date	Round	Time	Location	Notes
Win	6–3–1 (1)	Jens Pulver	Decision (unanimous)	Superior Challenge 9	23 November 2013	3	5:00	Gothenburg, Sweden	Aziz announced his retirement following the victory.
Loss	5–3–1 (1)	Joachim Hansen	Submission (armbar)	Superior Challenge 6	29 October 2010	2	3:47	Stockholm, Sweden	
Loss	5–2–1 (1)	Jameel Massouh	Decision (unanimous)	Superior Challenge 5	1 May 2010	3	5:00	Stockholm, Sweden	For SC Featherweight Championship.
Loss	5–1–1 (1)	Fábio Mello	Submission (armbar)	Bellator 12	19 June 2009	3	1:58	Hollywood, Florida, United States	
Win	5–0–1 (1)	Tomohiko Hori	Decision (unanimous)	Superior Challenge 3	30 May 2009	3	5:00	Stockholm, Sweden	
NC	4–0–1 (1)	Emmanuel Fernandez	NC (accidental headbutt)	Superior Challenge 2	25 October 2008	2	1:44	Stockholm, Sweden	Fight stopped and ruled a NC after Aziz was cut from an accidental headbutt.
Win	4–0–1	Frederic Fernandez	TKO (punches)	Superior Challenge 1	5 April 2008	1	0:37	Stockholm, Sweden	
Win	3–0–1	Hiroyuki Abe	KO (punches)	Bodog FIGHT: Vancouver	25 August 2007	1	2:31	Vancouver, British Columbia, Canada	
Draw	2–0–1	Rafael Dias	Draw	Bodog FIGHT: Costa Rica Combat	17 February 2007	3	5:00	Costa Rica	
Win	2–0	Anderson Pereira	Decision (unanimous)	Universal Promotions: Mix Fight	25 September 2005	3	5:00	Antwerp, Belgium	
Win	1–0	Wim Deputter	Decision (unanimous)	Dawsu Fight Event	16 April 2005	3	5:00	Belgium	
