= Rasoul Amani =

Iranian-New Zealander wrestler (born 1964)

Rasoul Amani (Persian: رسول امانی; born 1 December 1964 in Tehran, Iran) is an Iranian-New Zealander wrestler who represented New Zealand in Graeco-Roman wrestling in the 63 kg class at the 2000 Summer Olympics; see Wrestling at the 2000 Summer Olympics.
