= Yasutoshi Motoki =

Japanese wrestler

Personal information
- Nationality: Japanese
- Born: 23 December 1969 (age 56) Yamagata, Japan

Sport
- Sport: Wrestling

Yasutoshi Motoki (元木 康年, Motoki Yasutoshi; born 23 December 1969) is a Japanese wrestler. He competed in the men's Greco-Roman 63 kg at the 2000 Summer Olympics.

Originally from Sakata, Yamagata Prefecture, he competed in Judo throughout high school. After his graduation, he joined the Japan maritime Self Defense Force (海上自衛隊) and after a two-year period, began training at the Physical Training School (自衛隊体育学校) in 1989. After a brief attempt in Judo, he transitioned to Greco-Roman Wrestling and eventually won the All Japan Championships and berth in the Sydney 2000 Olympics.
