= Gurbinder Singh =

Indian wrestler

Personal information
- Nationality: Indian
- Born: 6 June 1977 (age 49)

Sport
- Sport: Wrestling

Gurbinder Singh (born 6 June 1977) is an Indian wrestler. He competed in the men's Greco-Roman 63 kg at the 2000 Summer Olympics.
