= Riccardo Magni =

Italian wrestler

Personal information
- Nationality: Italian
- Born: 5 March 1976 (age 50) Padua, Italy
- Height: 163 cm (5 ft 4 in)
- Weight: 63 kg (139 lb; 9 st 13 lb)

Sport
- Sport: Wrestling
- Club: Fiamme Oro

Riccardo Magni (born 5 March 1976) is an Italian wrestler. He competed in the men's Greco-Roman 63 kg at the 2000 Summer Olympics.
