= Choi Sang-sun =

South Korean wrestler (born 1972)

Personal information
- Nationality: South Korean
- Born: 13 February 1972 (age 54)

Sport
- Sport: Wrestling
Medal record
Greco-Roman wrestling
Representing South Korea
Asian Games
Gold medal – first place	1994 Hiroshima	62 kg
Gold medal – first place	1998 Bangkok	63 kg
Asian Championships
Gold medal – first place	1995 Manila	62 kg
Gold medal – first place	1996 Xiaoshan	62 kg
Gold medal – first place	1997 Tehran	69 kg

Choi Sang-sun (born 13 February 1972) is a South Korean wrestler. He competed at the 1996 Summer Olympics and the 2000 Summer Olympics. He also won the gold medal at the Asian Games in 1994 and 1998.
