= Kevin Bracken =

Olympic and USA World Team wrestler

Kevin Bracken (born October 29, 1971) American former Greco-Roman wrestler, healthcare consultant, and elected official. He represented the United States at the 2000 Summer Olympics in Sydney, 2000 Summer Olympics, where he placed sixth in Greco-Roman wrestling. During his competitive wrestling career, Bracken was a nine time U.S. national champion, a Pan American champion, a World Team member, and a World Cup champion.

== Career ==
=== High school career ===
He attended St. Laurence High School in Burbank, Illinois, where he was captain and most valuable wrestler for their first state championship team in wrestling. Bracken provides the Kevin Bracken scholarship fund to St. Laurence high school. He led the St. Laurence Vikings to a team state championship in 1990. Bracken was coached by Bob Trombetta and Thomas M. Gauger. Gauger sparked Bracken's interest in Greco-Roman wrestling that led to his success. Tom Gauger has coached several wrestlers that competed in the college ranks.

=== College ===
In college, Bracken wrestled for Illinois State University before they eliminated their wrestling program during his final year. Bracken holds the record for the most career wins in the history of the Illinois State University, with 123-31 at 142LBs.. In 2005, he was inducted into the Illinois State University hall of fame.

=== National/International ===
Bracken was a five-time national champion, three-time Alternate for the U.S. Olympic Team, and one-time Olympian. He was a Jr. National Championships runner-up in 1989 and Jr. National Champion in 1990 in Greco-Roman Wrestling. He was the 20-year-old age group National Champion in Greco-Roman and Freestyle and 5-time world team trials champion. Public Service - Bracken has also served in elected public office in Colorado. He was elected to two terms on the Castle Rock Town Council, where his responsibilities included strategic planning, policy development, and municipal budget oversight. He also founded and chaired the committee that helped establish the Douglas County Board of Health. Working with Douglas County staff and the community health assessment team, Bracken participated in evaluating the county’s public health priorities and service offerings. He helped develop a service based departmental budget and organizational framework for the new public health department and participated in its launch of the new Douglas County Health Department saving the County millions of dollars every year. Volunteer Coach at the US Olympic Training Center.

== Honors and award ==
- 1992, 1996, 2004 United States Olympic Team Alternate
- 1993, 1995, 2001 Pan-American silver medalist
- 1996 World Cup Champion
- 2000 Olympic Team Member, 6th Place
- 2001 World Championships, 7th Place
- 2003 Pan-American Champion
- Olympic Training Center Team Captain for six years
- 1998, 2001, 2002, 2003 World Team Member
