= Hrihoriy Kamyshenko =

Ukrainian wrestler (born 1972)

Personal information
- Nationality: Ukrainian
- Born: 10 March 1972 (age 54) Mariupol

Sport
- Sport: Wrestling
Medal record
Men's Greco-Roman wrestling
Representing Ukraine
European Championships
Gold medal – first place	1994 Athens	62 kg
Silver medal – second place	1996 Budapest	62 kg
European Espoirs Championships
Gold medal – first place	1992 Székesfehérvár	62 kg

Hrihoriy Kamyshenko (born 10 March 1972) is a Ukrainian wrestler. He competed at the 1996 Summer Olympics and the 2000 Summer Olympics.
