= Şeref Eroğlu =

Turkish wrestler (born 1975)

Personal information
- Nationality: Turkish
- Born: 25 November 1975 (age 50) Kahramanmaraş, Turkey
- Education: Gazi University; Kahramanmaraş Sütçüimam University; Hitit University
- Height: 1.67 m (5 ft 6 in)
- Weight: 67 kg (148 lb)

Sport
- Sport: Wrestling
- Event: Greco-Roman
- Club: Konya Şeker
- Turned pro: 1990
- Coached by: Erdoğan Koca
- Retired: 2008
Medal record
Men's Greco-Roman wrestling
Representing Turkey
Olympic Games
Silver medal – second place	2004 Athens	66 kg
World Championships
Gold medal – first place	1997 Wroclaw	63 kg
Silver medal – second place	1998 Gaevle	63 kg
Silver medal – second place	1999 Athens	63 kg
European Championships
Gold medal – first place	1994 Athens	57 kg
Gold medal – first place	1996 Budapest	57 kg
Gold medal – first place	1998 Minsk	63 kg
Gold medal – first place	2001 Istanbul	63 kg
Gold medal – first place	2002 Seinaejoki	66 kg
Gold medal – first place	2003 Belgrade	66 kg
Silver medal – second place	1997 Kouvola	63 kg
Bronze medal – third place	1999 Istanbul	63 kg
Bronze medal – third place	2006 Moscow	66 kg
World Cup
Gold medal – first place	2001 Levallois	63 kg
Silver medal – second place	2007 Antalya	66 kg
Mediterranean Games
Bronze medal – third place	1993 Languedoc-Roussillon	57 kg
World Military Championships
Gold medal – first place	2000 Camp Lejeune	63 kg
World Espoir Championships
Gold medal – first place	1995 Tehran	62 kg
Bronze medal – third place	1993 Athens	57 kg
European Espoir Championships
Gold medal – first place	1994 Istanbul	57 kg
World Junior Championships
Gold medal – first place	1992 Cali	54 kg
Bronze medal – third place	1991 Barcelone	46 kg
World Cadets Championships
Gold medal – first place	1990 Szombathely	40 kg
Silver medal – second place	1991 Alma	47 kg

Şeref Eroğlu (born 25 November 1975 in Kahramanmaraş) is a Turkish wrestler. He won 6 times in Europe (1994-1996-1998-2001-2002-2003) and once in the World (1997). At the 2004 Athens Olympics, he competed at 66 kg and won the silver medal. He served as the president of the Turkish Wrestling Federation between 2021 and 2024.

== Early life and wrestling career ==
Eroğlu was born on 25 November 1975, in Dereköy, Dulkadiroğlu, Kahramanmaraş. He completed his secondary and high school education at Sivas Pamukpınar Teacher's High School, his high school education at Gazi University Physical Education and Sports School, his master's degree at Kahramanmaraş Sütçü İmam University, and he continued his doctorate education in Sports Management at Hitit University Faculty of Sports Sciences.

He started wrestling with karakucak and entered Sivas Pamukpınar Wrestling Training Center in 1988. In 1990, he wore the national swimsuit for the first time in Hungary and became the Stars Greco-Roman World Champion.

He competed in the Men's Greco-Roman 66 kg at the 2004 Summer Olympics and won the silver medal. He is member of the İstanbul Büyükşehir Belediyesi S.K.

=== Wrestling titles and awards ===
He wore more than 1200 national jerseys and won 110 medals in international championships and tournaments. In 1997 and 1998, he was selected as the World's Best and Most Technical Wrestler by UWW.

He was a world champion and has won four gold and one silver medals at the European Championships. In 1997, he was named Greco-Roman Wrestler of the Year by the International Federation of Associated Wrestling Styles (FILA).

== Post-wrestling ==
After ending his wrestling career in 2008, he went to the US to study languages. He is a Delegate of the Turkish National Olympic Committee, Club President of the Champions Wrestling Club and a member of the Technical Committee of the International Wrestling Federation (UWW). He is married and has 2 children.

== Achievements ==
- 1991 World Juniors Championships in Spain - bronze
- 1992 World Juniors Championships in Colombia - gold
- 1992 European Espoir Championships in Székesfehérvár, Hungary - 5th (Bantamweight)
- 1993 World Espoir Championships in Greece - bronze
- 1993 Mediterranean Games in Languedoc-Roussillon, France - bronze (Bantamweight)
- 1994 World Championships in Tampere, Finland - 5th (Bantamweight)
- 1994 European Espoir Championships in Istanbul, Turkey - gold (Bantamweight)
- 1994 European Championships in Athens, Greece - gold (Bantamweight)
- 1995 World Espoir Championships in Tehran, Iran - gold (Featherweight)
- 1996 European Championships in Budapest, Hungary - gold (Bantamweight)
- 1997 European Championships in Oulu, Finland - silver (Featherweight)
- 1997 World Championships in Warsaw, Poland - gold (Featherweight)
- 1998 European Championships in Minsk, Belarus - gold (Featherweight)
- 1998 World Championships in Gävle, Sweden - silver (Featherweight)
- 2001 European Championships in Istanbul, Turkey - gold (Featherweight)
- 2004 Olympics in Athens, Greece - silver (Lightweight)
