= Beat Motzer =

Swiss wrestler

Personal information
- Nationality: Swiss
- Born: 2 September 1970 (age 55)

Sport
- Sport: Wrestling

Beat Motzer (born 2 September 1970) is a Swiss wrestler. He competed in the men's Greco-Roman 63 kg at the 2000 Summer Olympics.
