= Włodzimierz Zawadzki =

Polish sport wrestler

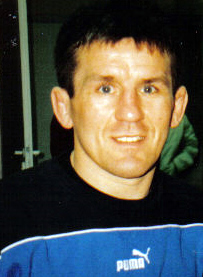

Personal information
- Born: 28 September 1967 (age 58) Polany, Poland
Medal record
Men's Greco-Roman wrestling
Representing Poland
Olympic Games
Gold medal – first place	1996 Atlanta	62 kg

Włodzimierz Jan Zawadzki (born 28 September 1967 in Polany, Poland) is a Polish sport wrestler. He is a member of MZKS Orzeł Wierzbica (1980–1987) and Legia Warszawa (since 1987).

He was a gold medalist at the 1996 Summer Olympics in Atlanta in the Men's Featherweight (57-62 kg) category. Medalist of wrestling world championships (silver: 1995, 2002; bronze: 1994, 1997), wrestling European championships (gold: 1991, 1995, 1999; bronze: 2001).

For his sport achievements, he received:
Knight's Cross of the Order of Polonia Restituta (5th Class) in 1996.
