= Mkhitar Manukyan =

Armenian-Kazakh wrestler

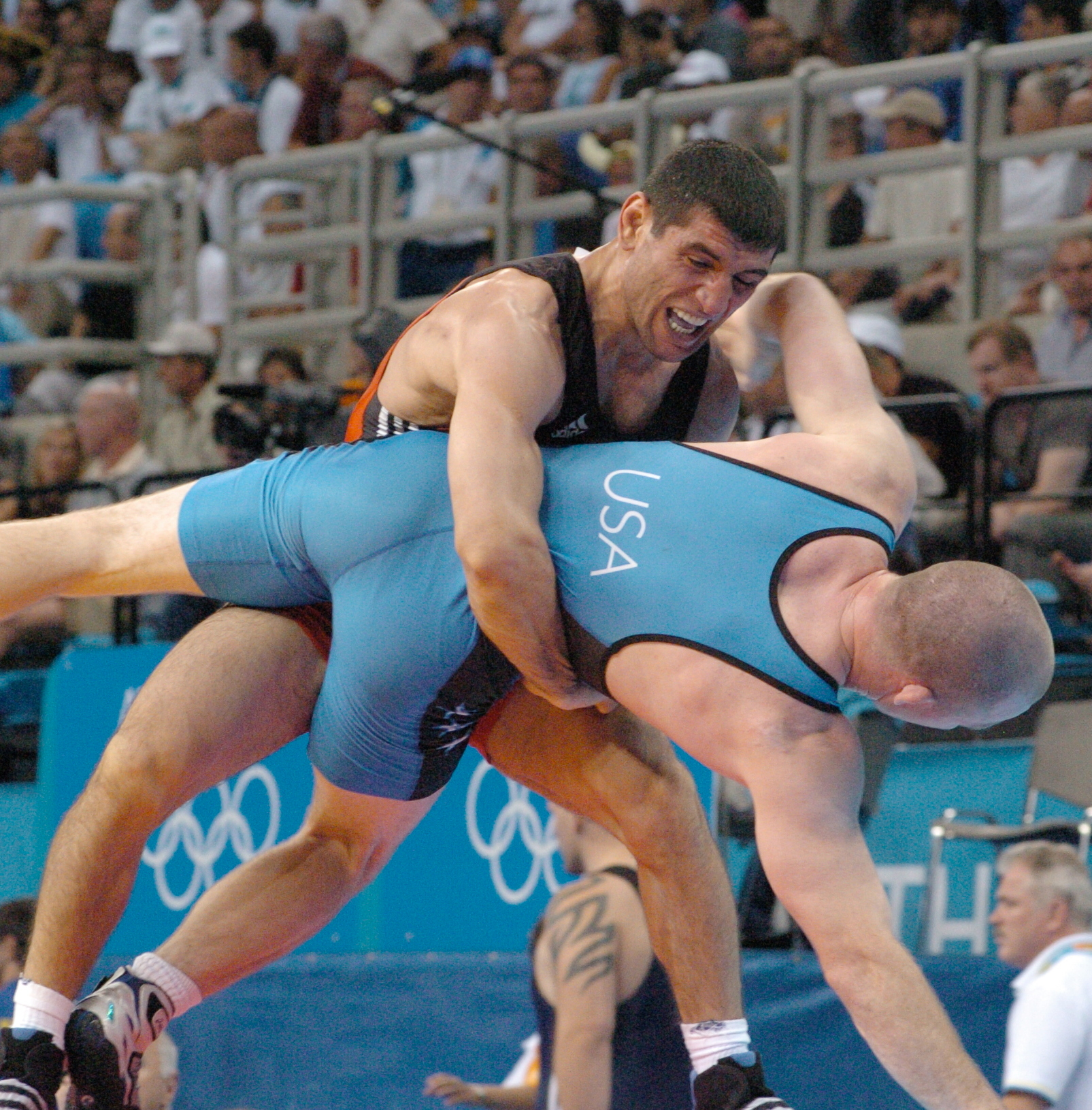
- Manukyan at the 2004 Olympics

Personal information
- Nationality: Armenian
- Born: 20 September 1973 (age 52) Leninakan, Armenian SSR, Soviet Union
- Height: 1.66 m (5 ft 5 1/2 in)
- Weight: 63 kg (139 lb)

Sport
- Country: Armenia; Kazakhstan
- Sport: Wrestling
- Event: Greco-Roman
- Club: Daulet, Alma-Ata
Medal record
Representing Armenia
World Championships
Bronze medal – third place	1995 Prague	62 kg
European Championships
Bronze medal – third place	1996 Budapest	62 kg
Representing Kazakhstan
Olympic Games
Bronze medal – third place	2004 Athens	66 kg
World Championships
Gold medal – first place	1998 Evle	62 kg
Gold medal – first place	1999 Athens	62 kg
Asian Championships
Gold medal – first place	1997 Tehran	63 kg
Gold medal – first place	1999 Tashkent	63 kg
World Cup
Gold medal – first place	2003 Almaty	66 kg

Mkhitar Manukyan (Armenian: Մխիթար Մանուկյան, born 20 September 1973) is a retired Armenian-Kazakh Greco-Roman wrestler. He competed at the 1996, 2000 and 2004 Olympics and won a bronze medal in 2004. He also won a world title in 1998 and 1999 and an Asian title in 1997 and 1999.

== Biography ==
Mkhitar Manukyan was born 20 September 1973 in Leninakan (now Gyumri), Armenia. He took up Greco-Roman wrestling at the age of ten. Manukyan lost both of his parents and a sister in the 1988 Armenian earthquake. According to him, this tragedy helped him in wrestling. He became a junior world champion twice in 1990 and 1991. From 1993 to 1996, Manukyan was a member of the Armenia national Greco-Roman wrestling team. He won bronze medals at the 1995 World Wrestling Championships and 1996 European Wrestling Championships. Manukyan participated at the 1996 Summer Olympics in Atlanta, together with his brothers Aghasi and Samvel.

In 1997, Manukyan received an invitation from the Greco-Roman wrestling head coach of Kazakhstan, Daulet Turlykhanov, and moved to Almaty and continued to compete under the flag of Kazakhstan. In the same year, Manukyan won a gold medal at the 1997 Asian Wrestling Championships. He later won a gold medal at the 1998 World Wrestling Championships. In 1999, Manukyan became a two-time Asian and two-time World Champion at the 1999 Asian Wrestling Championships and 1999 World Wrestling Championships. Manukyan was recognized as the best fighter of the year for 1999 by the International Federation of Associated Wrestling Styles. He was one of the medal favorites for the 2000 Summer Olympics in Sydney, but in the preliminary stage of the competition, he lost to Juan Marén and came in seventh place.

In January 2001, Manukyan underwent a complex surgery on the cervical vertebrae due to a serious back injury, and could not recover to his previous level. Yet he was selected for the 2004 Summer Olympics and won a bronze medal. In the semifinal, he suffered his only loss to Seref Eroglu, while leading 3–2, and then defeated Jimmy Samuelsson.

Manukyan retired in 2005 to become an assistant coach, and later the head coach of the Kazakhstan Greco-Roman wrestling team.

== Personal life ==
Manukyan is married to Arevik, an Armenian woman from Gyumri; they have a daughter named Nora who is a scholar.
