= Akaki Chachua =

Georgian Greco-Roman wrestler

Personal information
- Born: September 16, 1969 (age 56) Samtredia, Georgian SSR, Soviet Union
Medal record
Men's Greco-Roman wrestling
Representing Georgia
Olympic Games
Bronze medal – third place	2000 Sydney	64 kg

Akaki Chachua (Georgian: აკაკი ჩაჩუა; born September 16, 1969) is a Georgian wrestler who competed in the Men's Greco-Roman 64 kg at the 2000 Summer Olympics and won the bronze medal. He also competed in the 2004 Summer Olympics and finished 9th.
