= Yi Shanjun =

Chinese wrestler (born 1977)

Personal information
- Nationality: Chinese
- Born: 14 July 1977 (age 49)

Sport
- Sport: Wrestling

Yi Shanjun (born 14 July 1977) is a Chinese wrestler. He competed in the men's Greco-Roman 63 kg at the 2000 Summer Olympics.
