= Juan Marén =

Cuban wrestler (born 1971)

Personal information
- Full name: Juan Luis Marén Delis
- Born: August 20, 1971 (age 54) Santiago de Cuba, Cuba
Medal record
Men's Greco-Roman wrestling
Representing Cuba
Olympic Games
| Silver medal – second place | 1996 Atlanta | 62 kg |
| Silver medal – second place | 2000 Sydney | 63 kg |
| Bronze medal – third place | 1992 Barcelona | 62 kg |
World Championships
| Bronze medal – third place | 1991 Varna | 62 kg |
| Bronze medal – third place | 1993 Stockholm | 62 kg |
World Cup
| Gold medal – first place | 1992 Besançon | 62 kg |
| Gold medal – first place | 1995 Schifferstadt | 62 kg |
| Bronze medal – third place | 1996 Colorado Springs | 62 kg |
Pan American Games
| Gold medal – first place | 1991 Havana | 62 kg |
| Gold medal – first place | 1995 Mar del Plata | 62 kg |
| Gold medal – first place | 1999 Winnipeg | 63 kg |
| Gold medal – first place | 2003 Santo Domingo | 66 kg |
Espoir World Championships
| Silver medal – second place | 1989 Budapest | 62 kg |
Junior World Championships
| Gold medal – first place | 1988 Wolfurt | 58 kg |

Juan Luis Marén Delis (born August 20, 1971) is a Cuban wrestler in the Greco-Roman style, who has won three medals at the Olympic Games. He was born in Santiago de Cuba.
