= Bakhodir Kurbanov (wrestler) =

Uzbekistani Greco-Roman wrestler

Personal information
- Born: 5 December 1972 (age 53) Samarkand Oblast, Uzbek SSR, Soviet Union
- Height: 1.70 m (5 ft 7 in)
- Weight: 63 kg (139 lb)

Sport
- Sport: Greco-Roman wrestling
- Club: Spartak Tashkent
Medal record
Representing Uzbekistan
Asian Games
Bronze medal – third place	1994 Hiroshima	Featherweight
Silver medal – second place	1998 Bangkok	Featherweight
Asian Wrestling Championships
Silver medal – second place	1995 Manila	Featherweight
Silver medal – second place	1999 Tashkent	Featherweight
Gold medal – first place	2000 Guilin	Featherweight

Bakhodir Kurbanov (Russian: Баходир Курбанов; born 5 December 1972) is a retired Greco-Roman wrestler from Uzbekistan. He competed at the 1996 and 2000 Summer Olympics in the featherweight (-62 kg) and lightweight (-63 kg), respectively, and finished in 16th and fifth place. He won a bronze and a silver medal at the 1994 and 1998 Asian Games, respectively, and finished fourth in 2002.

== Family ==
Kurbanov is the youngest of five brothers, all wrestlers. In December 1997 he married Oksana Chusovitina, an Olympic gymnast from Uzbekistan whom he met at the 1994 Asian Games in Japan. The marriage was opposed by Chusovitina's Orthodox Christian parents because Kurbanov is a Muslim. Their son Alisher was born in November 1999, and in late 2002 he was diagnosed with acute lymphocytic leukemia. In search for qualified treatment the family moved to Cologne, Germany, and used fundraisers and donations from gymnastics fans to pay for medical bills. In 2006, Chusovitina received German citizenship. After completing medical treatment Bakhodir and Alisher returned to Uzbekistan, though Chusovitina plans to brings them back to Germany.
