= 2003 World Wrestling Championships – Men's Greco-Roman 66 kg =

Competition featured at the 2003 World Wrestling Championships

Men's Greco-Roman 66 kg at the 2003 World Championships
- Venue: Palais des Sports Robert Oubron
- Dates: 2–4 October 2003
- Competitors: 46 from 46 nations

Medalists
gold medal	Manuchar Kvirkvelia	Georgia
silver medal	Armen Vardanyan	Ukraine
bronze medal	Levente Füredy	Hungary

The men's Greco-Roman 66 kilograms is a competition featured at the 2003 World Wrestling Championships, and was held at the Palais des Sports Robert Oubron in Créteil, France from 2 to 4 October 2003.

== Results ==
Legend

- R — Retired

=== Preliminary round ===
==== Pool 1 ====
Pos	Athlete	Pld	W	L	CP	TP	GEO	CZE	CAN
1	Manuchar Kvirkvelia (GEO)	2	2	0	6	9	—	6–0	3–0
2	Ondřej Jaroš (CZE)	2	1	1	3	4	0–3 PO	—	4–0
3	Ainsley Robinson (CAN)	2	0	2	0	0	0–3 PO	0–3 PO	—

Source: Official website

==== Pool 2 ====
Pos	Athlete	Pld	W	L	CP	TP	POL	KAZ	TUN
1	Ryszard Wolny (POL)	2	2	0	7	14	—	3–1	11–0
2	Mkhitar Manukyan (KAZ)	2	1	1	4	9	1–3 PP	—	8–0
3	Mohamed Barguaoui (TUN)	2	0	2	0	0	0–4 ST	0–3 PO	—

Source: Official website

==== Pool 3 ====
Pos	Athlete	Pld	W	L	CP	TP	ESP	AUT	AUS
1	Moisés Sánchez (ESP)	2	2	0	7	14	—	4–0	10–0 Fall
2	Peter Philippitsch (AUT)	2	1	1	4	11	0–3 PO	—	11–0 Fall
3	Matthew Collins (AUS)	2	0	2	0	0	0–4 TO	0–4 TO	—

Source: Official website

==== Pool 4 ====
Pos	Athlete	Pld	W	L	CP	TP	TUR	RUS	EST
1	Şeref Eroğlu (TUR)	2	2	0	6	15	—	6–0	9–0
2	Sergey Kuntarev (RUS)	2	1	1	3	4	0–3 PO	—	4–0
3	Olari Suislep (EST)	2	0	2	0	0	0–3 PO	0–3 PO	—

Source: Official website

==== Pool 5 ====
Pos	Athlete	Pld	W	L	CP	TP	CUB	IND	LAT
1	Juan Marén (CUB)	2	2	0	6	7	—	3–0	4–0
2	Gurbinder Singh (IND)	2	1	1	3	4	0–3 PO	—	4–3
3	Vjačeslavs Maslobojevs (LAT)	2	0	2	1	3	0–3 PO	1–3 PP	—

Source: Official website

==== Pool 6 ====
Pos	Athlete	Pld	W	L	CP	TP	HUN	FIN	LTU
1	Levente Füredy (HUN)	2	2	0	6	9	—	5–1	4–0
2	Juha Lappalainen (FIN)	2	1	1	4	10	1–3 PP	—	9–2
3	Valdemaras Venckaitis (LTU)	2	0	2	1	2	0–3 PO	1–3 PP	—

Source: Official website

==== Pool 7 ====
Pos	Athlete	Pld	W	L	CP	TP	KOR	USA	NED
1	Kim In-sub (KOR)	2	2	0	6	9	—	3–1	6–0
2	Kevin Bracken (USA)	2	1	1	5	12	1–3 PP	—	11–1
3	Hovhannes Kurghinyan (NED)	2	0	2	1	1	0–3 PO	1–4 SP	—

Source: Official website

==== Pool 8 ====
Pos	Athlete	Pld	W	L	CP	TP	UZB	FRA	DEN
1	Bakhodir Kurbanov (UZB)	2	2	0	7	16	—	6–0	10–0
2	Philippe Bendjoudi (FRA)	2	1	1	3	3	0–3 PO	—	3–0
3	Morten Helt (DEN)	2	0	2	0	0	0–4 ST	0–3 PO	—

Source: Official website

==== Pool 9 ====
Pos	Athlete	Pld	W	L	CP	TP	BLR	ISR	SYR
1	Eduard Aplevich (BLR)	2	2	0	6	8	—	5–1	3–0
2	Michael Beilin (ISR)	2	1	1	5	1	1–3 PP	—	WO
3	Yaser Al-Saleh (SYR)	2	0	2	0	0	0–3 PO	0–4 PA	—

Source: Official website

==== Pool 10 ====
Pos	Athlete	Pld	W	L	CP	TP	AZE	CHN	ITA
1	Farid Mansurov (AZE)	2	2	0	8	22	—	12–0	10–0
2	Qiao Huameng (CHN)	2	1	1	3	3	0–4 ST	—	3–0
3	Rocco Fabio Spanò (ITA)	2	0	2	0	0	0–4 ST	0–3 PO	—

Source: Official website

==== Pool 11 ====
Pos	Athlete	Pld	W	L	CP	TP	SWE	BUL	VEN
1	Jimmy Samuelsson (SWE)	2	2	0	7	15	—	4–0	11–0
2	Nikolay Gergov (BUL)	2	1	1	3	3	0–3 PO	—	3–0
3	Endrix Arteaga (VEN)	2	0	2	0	0	0–4 ST	0–3 PO	—

Source: Official website

==== Pool 12 ====
Pos	Athlete	Pld	W	L	CP	TP	ARM	SUI	MDA
1	Vaghinak Galstyan (ARM)	2	1	1	5	11	—	9–0 Ret	2–4
2	Daniel Schnyder (SUI)	2	0	2	0	0	0–4 PA	—	0–12
DQ	Nikolay Monov (MDA)	2	2	0	7	16	3–1 PP	4–0 ST	—

Source: Official website
- Nikolay Monov was disqualified at the end of the preliminary round for being found ineligible.

==== Pool 13 ====
Pos	Athlete	Pld	W	L	CP	TP	GER	JPN	ROM
1	Jannis Zamanduridis (GER)	2	2	0	6	8	—	4–1	4–0
2	Masaki Imuro (JPN)	2	1	1	5	7	1–3 PP	—	6–5 Fall
3	Ion Panait (ROM)	2	0	2	0	5	0–3 PO	0–4 TO	—

Source: Official website

==== Pool 14 ====
Pos	Athlete	Pld	W	L	CP	TP	COL	BIH	TPE
1	Luis Izquierdo (COL)	2	2	0	8	25	—	10–0	15–0
2	Dragan Marković (BIH)	2	1	1	4	10	0–4 ST	—	10–0
3	Lin Hsin-hung (TPE)	2	0	2	0	0	0–4 ST	0–4 ST	—

Source: Official website

==== Pool 15 ====
Pos	Athlete	Pld	W	L	CP	TP	UKR	IRI	KGZ	GRE
1	Armen Vardanyan (UKR)	3	3	0	9	13	—	4–2	3–2	6–3
2	Parviz Zeidvand (IRI)	3	2	1	8	17	1–3 PP	—	5–4	10–0
3	Kanatbek Begaliev (KGZ)	3	1	2	5	10	1–3 PP	1–3 PP	—	4–1
4	Georgios Boukis (GRE)	3	0	3	2	4	1–3 PP	0–4 ST	1–3 PP	—

Source: Official website

=== Knockout round ===
Round of 16
Manuchar Kvirkvelia (GEO)	10
Ryszard Wolny (POL)	1^{R}
Moisés Sánchez (ESP)	3
Şeref Eroğlu (TUR)	10
Juan Marén (CUB)	0
Levente Füredy (HUN)	3
Kim In-sub (KOR)	3
Bakhodir Kurbanov (UZB)	0
Eduard Aplevich (BLR)	0
Farid Mansurov (AZE)	3
Jimmy Samuelsson (SWE)	3
Vaghinak Galstyan (ARM)	4
Jannis Zamanduridis (GER)	9
Luis Izquierdo (COL)	4

Quarterfinals
Manuchar Kvirkvelia (GEO)	7
Şeref Eroğlu (TUR)	3
Levente Füredy (HUN)	3
Kim In-sub (KOR)	2
Farid Mansurov (AZE)	0
Vaghinak Galstyan (ARM)	5
Jannis Zamanduridis (GER)	1
Armen Vardanyan (UKR)	3

Semifinals
Manuchar Kvirkvelia (GEO)	6
Levente Füredy (HUN)	2
Vaghinak Galstyan (ARM)	2
Armen Vardanyan (UKR)	5

Final
Manuchar Kvirkvelia (GEO)	5
Armen Vardanyan (UKR)	2
Bronze medal match
Levente Füredy (HUN)	3
Vaghinak Galstyan (ARM)	2
