= 2002 World Wrestling Championships – Men's Greco-Roman 66 kg =

Men's Greco-Roman 66 kg at the 2002 World Championships
- Venue: Universal Sports Hall CSKA
- Dates: 20–21 September 2002
- Competitors: 33 from 33 nations

Medalists
gold medal	Jimmy Samuelsson	Sweden
silver medal	Farid Mansurov	Azerbaijan
bronze medal	Manuchar Kvirkvelia	Georgia

The men's Greco-Roman 66 kilograms is a competition featured at the 2002 World Wrestling Championships, and was held at the Universal Sports Hall CSKA in Moscow, Russia from 20 to 21 September 2002.

== Results ==
=== Preliminary round ===
==== Pool 1 ====
Pos	Athlete	Pld	W	L	CP	TP	ARM	GER	NOR
1	Vaghinak Galstyan (ARM)	2	2	0	7	14	—	4–1	10–0 Fall
2	Eduard Kratz (GER)	2	1	1	5	11	1–3 PP	—	10–0
3	Stig Hansen Hauan (NOR)	2	0	2	0	0	0–4 TO	0–4 ST	—

Source: Official website

==== Pool 2 ====
Pos	Athlete	Pld	W	L	CP	TP	RUS	HUN	JPN
1	Maksim Semenov (RUS)	2	2	0	7	15	—	5–0	10–0
2	Levente Füredy (HUN)	2	1	1	3	2	0–3 PO	—	2–1
3	Masaki Imuro (JPN)	2	0	2	1	1	0–4 ST	1–3 PP	—

Source: Official website

==== Pool 3 ====
Pos	Athlete	Pld	W	L	CP	TP	TUR	ISR	SUI
1	Şeref Eroğlu (TUR)	2	2	0	7	13	—	3–3	10–0
2	Michael Beilin (ISR)	2	1	1	5	13	1–3 PP	—	10–0
3	Ivan Kron (SUI)	2	0	2	0	0	0–4 ST	0–4 ST	—

Source: Official website

==== Pool 4 ====
Pos	Athlete	Pld	W	L	CP	TP	IRI	KAZ	VEN
1	Mehdi Hodaei (IRI)	2	2	0	6	11	—	4–2	7–1
2	Bek Mardenov (KAZ)	2	1	1	4	5	1–3 PP	—	3–1
3	Endrix Arteaga (VEN)	2	0	2	2	2	1–3 PP	1–3 PP	—

Source: Official website

==== Pool 5 ====
Pos	Athlete	Pld	W	L	CP	TP	POL	UKR	AUT
1	Jerzy Szeibinger (POL)	2	2	0	6	7	—	2–1	5–0
2	Hrihoriy Kamyshenko (UKR)	2	1	1	4	3	1–3 PP	—	2–1
3	Peter Philippitsch (AUT)	2	0	2	1	1	0–3 PO	1–3 PP	—

Source: Official website

==== Pool 6 ====
Pos	Athlete	Pld	W	L	CP	TP	CUB	LTU	MDA
1	Juan Marén (CUB)	2	2	0	6	7	—	3–0	4–0
2	Valdemaras Venckaitis (LTU)	2	1	1	3	3	0–3 PO	—	3–1
3	Tudor Gaivan (MDA)	2	0	2	1	1	0–3 PO	1–3 PP	—

Source: Official website

==== Pool 7 ====
Pos	Athlete	Pld	W	L	CP	TP	SWE	CHN	KGZ
1	Jimmy Samuelsson (SWE)	2	2	0	7	15	—	3–0	12–0
2	Li Chaojie (CHN)	2	1	1	3	7	0–3 PO	—	7–3
3	Viktor Kosarev (KGZ)	2	0	2	1	3	0–4 ST	1–3 PP	—

Source: Official website

==== Pool 8 ====
Pos	Athlete	Pld	W	L	CP	TP	UZB	ROM	FRA
1	Bakhodir Kurbanov (UZB)	2	2	0	7	10	—	5–0 Fall	5–3
2	Emil Constantin (ROM)	2	1	1	3	6	0–4 TO	—	6–1
3	Mickaël Beyer (FRA)	2	0	2	2	4	1–3 PP	1–3 PP	—

Source: Official website

==== Pool 9 ====
Pos	Athlete	Pld	W	L	CP	TP	AZE	USA	CZE
1	Farid Mansurov (AZE)	2	2	0	6	8	—	4–1	4–0
2	Kevin Bracken (USA)	2	1	1	4	9	1–3 PP	—	8–5
3	Ondřej Jaroš (CZE)	2	0	2	1	5	0–3 PO	1–3 PP	—

Source: Official website

==== Pool 10 ====
Pos	Athlete	Pld	W	L	CP	TP	BUL	FIN	ESP
1	Nikolay Gergov (BUL)	2	2	0	7	17	—	5–0	12–0
2	Kim-Jussi Nurmela (FIN)	2	1	1	3	5	0–3 PO	—	5–1
3	Moisés Sánchez (ESP)	2	0	2	1	1	0–4 ST	1–3 PP	—

Source: Official website

==== Pool 11 ====
Pos	Athlete	Pld	W	L	CP	TP	GEO	GRE	BLR
1	Manuchar Kvirkvelia (GEO)	2	2	0	8	12	—	7–0 Fall	5–4 Fall
2	Konstantinos Arkoudeas (GRE)	2	1	1	3	3	0–4 TO	—	3–0
3	Vitaly Zhuk (BLR)	2	0	2	0	4	0–4 TO	0–3 PO	—

Source: Official website

=== Knockout round ===
Round of 16
Vaghinak Galstyan (ARM)	3
Maksim Semenov (RUS)	5
Şeref Eroğlu (TUR)	0
Mehdi Hodaei (IRI)	3
Jerzy Szeibinger (POL)	2
Juan Marén (CUB)	5

Quarterfinals
Maksim Semenov (RUS)	5
Mehdi Hodaei (IRI)	3
Juan Marén (CUB)	0
Jimmy Samuelsson (SWE)	4
Bakhodir Kurbanov (UZB)	3
Farid Mansurov (AZE)	7
Nikolay Gergov (BUL)	2
Manuchar Kvirkvelia (GEO)	8

Semifinals
Maksim Semenov (RUS)	2
Jimmy Samuelsson (SWE)	3
Farid Mansurov (AZE)	3
Manuchar Kvirkvelia (GEO)	2

Final
Jimmy Samuelsson (SWE)	3
Farid Mansurov (AZE)	0
Bronze medal match
Maksim Semenov (RUS)	2
Manuchar Kvirkvelia (GEO)	4
