= 2007 World Wrestling Championships – Men's Greco-Roman 74 kg =

Men's Greco-Roman 74 kg at the 2007 World Championships
- Venue: Heydar Aliyev Sports and Concert Complex
- Dates: 18 September 2007
- Competitors: 54 from 54 nations

Medalists
gold medal	Yavor Yanakiev	Bulgaria
silver medal	Mark Madsen	Denmark
bronze medal	Valdemaras Venckaitis	Lithuania
bronze medal	Christophe Guénot	France

The men's Greco-Roman 74 kilograms is a competition featured at the 2007 World Wrestling Championships, and was held at the Heydar Aliyev Sports and Concert Complex in Baku, Azerbaijan on 18 September 2007.

== Results ==
Legend

- C — Won by 3 cautions given to the opponent
- F — Won by fall
- WO — Won by walkover

=== Finals ===
Semifinals				Final
Yavor Yanakiev (BUL)	2	4
Roman Melyoshin (KAZ)	0	0		Yavor Yanakiev (BUL)	2	3
Mark Madsen (DEN)	1	4	1	Mark Madsen (DEN)	0	0
Julian Kwit (POL)	1	1	1

=== Top half ===
==== Section 1 ====
Round of 64

Round of 32
Valdemaras Venckaitis (LTU)	6	6
Bakhit Sharif Badr (QAT)	0	0
Yavor Yanakiev (BUL)	6	7
Eamonn Dorgan (IRL)	0	0
Felipe Macedo (BRA)	0	0
Refik Ayvazoğlu (TUR)	6	4
Odelis Herrero (CUB)	6	6
Bhupinder Thakur (IND)	0	0

Round of 16
Valdemaras Venckaitis (LTU)	1	1	0
Yavor Yanakiev (BUL)	2	1	3
Refik Ayvazoğlu (TUR)	6	1	1
Odelis Herrero (CUB)	0	5	2

Quarterfinals
Yavor Yanakiev (BUL)	3	1	1
Odelis Herrero (CUB)	1	1	1

==== Section 2 ====
Round of 64
Roman Melyoshin (KAZ)	4	1
Jure Kuhar (SLO)	0	1
Mihajlo Bajlović (SRB)	2	1	1
Jakhongir Muminov (UZB)	2	1	1
Mohammad Mahroussa (SYR)	1	2
Goran Bulatović (MNE)	1	1
Ahmed Abdelsadek (EGY)	2	3
Juan José Ruiz (ESP)	0	1
Rocco Fabio Spanò (ITA)	0	0
Jung Tae-kyun (KOR)	3	3
Alexis Varela (VEN)	0	0
Mohammad Babulfath (SWE)	6	8^{F}

Round of 32
Neven Žugaj (CRO)	2	3	1
Daniar Kobonov (KGZ)	4	0	1
Roman Melyoshin (KAZ)	6	6
Mihajlo Bajlović (SRB)	0	0
Mohammad Mahroussa (SYR)	1	0
Ahmed Abdelsadek (EGY)	1	4
Jung Tae-kyun (KOR)	3	5
Mohammad Babulfath (SWE)	2	0

Round of 16
Neven Žugaj (CRO)	0	0
Roman Melyoshin (KAZ)	3	3
Ahmed Abdelsadek (EGY)	3	0	1
Jung Tae-kyun (KOR)	0	4	3

Quarterfinals
Roman Melyoshin (KAZ)	5^{F}
Jung Tae-kyun (KOR)	2

=== Bottom half ===
==== Section 3 ====
Round of 64
Christophe Guénot (FRA)	2	5
Joakim Aardalen (NOR)	0	2
T. C. Dantzler (USA)	3	2
Volodymyr Shatskykh (UKR)	1	1
Angelo Mota (DOM)	0	0
Mehdi Mohammadi (IRI)	7	3^{C}
Hassan Shahsavan (AUS)	0	1
Ilya Shafran (ISR)	3	4
Chang Yongxiang (CHN)	0	2
Manuchar Kvirkvelia (GEO)	3	2
Reto Bucher (SUI)	0	3	1
Konstantin Schneider (GER)	7	3	6
Aleksandrs Višņakovs (LAT)	2	0
Sergios Solontkis (GRE)	5	3^{F}
Ilgar Abdulov (AZE)	1	0
Mark Madsen (DEN)	1	3

Round of 32
Christophe Guénot (FRA)	1	3
T. C. Dantzler (USA)	1	3
Mehdi Mohammadi (IRI)
Ilya Shafran (ISR)	W	O
Manuchar Kvirkvelia (GEO)	4	3	2
Konstantin Schneider (GER)	0	3	4
Sergios Solontkis (GRE)	0	1	0
Mark Madsen (DEN)	8	1	3

Round of 16
Christophe Guénot (FRA)	2	4
Ilya Shafran (ISR)	0	0
Konstantin Schneider (GER)	1	1	1
Mark Madsen (DEN)	1	1	2

Quarterfinals
Christophe Guénot (FRA)	0	1
Mark Madsen (DEN)	2	4

==== Section 4 ====
Round of 64
Eerik Aps (EST)	0	1
Marko Yli-Hannuksela (FIN)	3	1
Arsen Julfalakyan (ARM)	0	3	4
Aleh Mikhalovich (BLR)	4	0	0
Julian Kwit (POL)	6	4
Cristian Rusu (ROU)	0	0
Nguyễn Văn Bình (VIE)	0	0
Ali Kadhim (IRQ)	6	3
Keitani Graham (FSM)	1	0
Döwletgeldi Kadyrow (TKM)	4	7
Péter Bácsi (HUN)	3	3
Sixto Barrera (PER)	1	1
Tsukasa Tsurumaki (JPN)	3	3	1
Zied Ayet Ikram (TUN)	0	5	1
Evgeny Popov (RUS)	1	1
Messaoud Zeghdane (ALG)	1	1

Round of 32
Marko Yli-Hannuksela (FIN)	2	1	4
Arsen Julfalakyan (ARM)	1	3	2
Julian Kwit (POL)	3	5
Ali Kadhim (IRQ)	0	0
Döwletgeldi Kadyrow (TKM)	0	0
Péter Bácsi (HUN)	6	7
Tsukasa Tsurumaki (JPN)	0	1	1
Evgeny Popov (RUS)	2	1	1

Round of 16
Marko Yli-Hannuksela (FIN)	1	1
Julian Kwit (POL)	1	1
Péter Bácsi (HUN)	6	1	2
Tsukasa Tsurumaki (JPN)	3	3	1

Quarterfinals
Julian Kwit (POL)	0	3	5
Péter Bácsi (HUN)	4	1	0

=== Repechage ===
Repechage round 1
Ilgar Abdulov (AZE)	7	1	7
Sergios Solontkis (GRE)	0	1	0

Repechage round 2
Eamonn Dorgan (IRL)	1
Valdemaras Venckaitis (LTU)	3^{F}
Ilgar Abdulov (AZE)	1	0	0
Konstantin Schneider (GER)	1	2	3

Repechage round 3
Valdemaras Venckaitis (LTU)	0	6	2
Odelis Herrero (CUB)	3	0	1
Konstantin Schneider (GER)	0	6	2
Christophe Guénot (FRA)	4	1	2

Bronze medals
Valdemaras Venckaitis (LTU)	2	3
Roman Melyoshin (KAZ)	1	0
Christophe Guénot (FRA)	1	5
Julian Kwit (POL)	1	0
