= Wrestling at the 2004 Summer Olympics – Men's Greco-Roman 66 kg =

Men's Greco-Roman 66 kg at the Games of the XXVIII Olympiad
- Venue: Ano Liosia Olympic Hall
- Date: 24–25 August 2004
- Competitors: 20 from 20 nations

Medalists
1st place, gold medalist(s)		Farid Mansurov	Azerbaijan
2nd place, silver medalist(s)		Şeref Eroğlu	Turkey
3rd place, bronze medalist(s)		Mkhitar Manukyan	Kazakhstan

The men's Greco-Roman 66 kilograms at the 2004 Summer Olympics as part of the wrestling program were held at the Ano Liosia Olympic Hall, August 24 to August 25.

The competition held with an elimination system of three or four wrestlers in each pool, with the winners qualifying for the quarterfinals, semifinals and the final by way of direct elimination.

== Schedule ==
All times are Eastern European Summer Time (UTC+03:00)

Date	Time	Event
24 August 2004	09:30	Round 1
24 August 2004	09:30	Round 2
24 August 2004	17:30	Round 3
24 August 2004	17:30	Qualification
25 August 2004	09:30	Semifinals
25 August 2004	17:30	Finals

== Results ==
Legend

- D — Disqualified
- F — Won by fall

=== Elimination pools ===
==== Pool 1 ====
Pos	Athlete	Pld	W	L	CP	TP	Qualification
1	Jimmy Samuelsson (SWE)	2	1	1	4 (Note: Tied on the number of wins by fall and superiority. Technical points were used to determine the pool winner. Galstyan and Semenov were ranked by their head-to-head result: ARM 3–1 RUS.)	6	Knockout round
2	Vaghinak Galstyan (ARM)	2	1	1	4	4	
3	Maksim Semenov (RUS)	2	1	1	4	5	

Source: Official website
Notes:

	Score		CP
Vaghinak Galstyan (ARM)	2–2	Maksim Semenov (RUS)	3–1 PP
Jimmy Samuelsson (SWE)	5–2	Vaghinak Galstyan (ARM)	3–1 PP
Maksim Semenov (RUS)	3–1	Jimmy Samuelsson (SWE)	3–1 PP

==== Pool 2 ====
Pos	Athlete	Pld	W	L	CP	TP	Qualification
1	Kim In-sub (KOR)	2	2	0	6	9	Knockout round
2	Nikolay Gergov (BUL)	2	1	1	3	3	
3	Levente Füredy (HUN)	2	0	2	2	3	

Source: Official website

	Score		CP
Levente Füredy (HUN)	2–3	Nikolay Gergov (BUL)	1–3 PP
Kim In-sub (KOR)	6–1	Levente Füredy (HUN)	3–1 PP
Nikolay Gergov (BUL)	0–3	Kim In-sub (KOR)	0–3 PO

==== Pool 3 ====
Pos	Athlete	Pld	W	L	CP	TP	Qualification
1	Farid Mansurov (AZE)	2	2	0	6	9	Knockout round
2	Juan Marén (CUB)	2	1	1	3	3	
3	Ryszard Wolny (POL)	2	0	2	1	2	

Source: Official website

	Score		CP
Farid Mansurov (AZE)	3–0	Juan Marén (CUB)	3–0 PO
Ryszard Wolny (POL)	2–6	Farid Mansurov (AZE)	1–3 PP
Juan Marén (CUB)	3–0	Ryszard Wolny (POL)	3–0 PO

==== Pool 4 ====
Pos	Athlete	Pld	W	L	CP	TP	Qualification
1	Parviz Zeidvand (IRI)	2	2	0	6	8	Knockout round
2	Kanatbek Begaliev (KGZ)	2	1	1	3	9	
3	Moisés Sánchez (ESP)	2	0	2	2	2	

Source: Official website

	Score		CP
Kanatbek Begaliev (KGZ)	0–5	Parviz Zeidvand (IRI)	0–3 PO
Moisés Sánchez (ESP)	1–9	Kanatbek Begaliev (KGZ)	1–3 PP
Parviz Zeidvand (IRI)	3–1	Moisés Sánchez (ESP)	3–1 PP

==== Pool 5 ====
Pos	Athlete	Pld	W	L	CP	TP	Qualification
1	Şeref Eroğlu (TUR)	3	3	0	11	26	Knockout round
2	Armen Vardanyan (UKR)	3	2	1	8	13	
3	Luis Izquierdo (COL)	3	1	2	4	0	
4	Manuchar Kvirkvelia (GEO)	3	0	3	0	1	

Source: Official website

	Score		CP
Armen Vardanyan (UKR)	13–0	Luis Izquierdo (COL)	4–0 ST
Manuchar Kvirkvelia (GEO)	1–11	Şeref Eroğlu (TUR)	0–4 EV
Armen Vardanyan (UKR)	WO	Manuchar Kvirkvelia (GEO)	4–0 EV
Luis Izquierdo (COL)	0–10	Şeref Eroğlu (TUR)	0–4 ST
Armen Vardanyan (UKR)	0–5	Şeref Eroğlu (TUR)	0–3 PO
Luis Izquierdo (COL)	WO	Manuchar Kvirkvelia (GEO)	4–0 EV

==== Pool 6 ====
Pos	Athlete	Pld	W	L	CP	TP	Qualification
1	Mkhitar Manukyan (KAZ)	3	3	0	10	18	Knockout round
2	Konstantinos Arkoudeas (GRE)	3	2	1	7	13	
3	Jannis Zamanduridis (GER)	3	1	2	5	9	
4	Oscar Wood (USA)	3	0	3	3	6	

Source: Official website

	Score		CP
Jannis Zamanduridis (GER)	2–3	Mkhitar Manukyan (KAZ)	1–3 PP
Oscar Wood (USA)	3–9	Konstantinos Arkoudeas (GRE)	1–3 PP
Jannis Zamanduridis (GER)	5–2	Oscar Wood (USA)	3–1 PP
Mkhitar Manukyan (KAZ)	4–1	Konstantinos Arkoudeas (GRE)	3–1 PP
Jannis Zamanduridis (GER)	2–3	Konstantinos Arkoudeas (GRE)	1–3 PP
Mkhitar Manukyan (KAZ)	11–1	Oscar Wood (USA)	4–1 SP

=== Knockout round ===
Qualification
Jimmy Samuelsson (SWE)	3
Kim In-sub (KOR)	1
Farid Mansurov (AZE)	2
Parviz Zeidvand (IRI)	1

Semifinals
Jimmy Samuelsson (SWE)	1
Farid Mansurov (AZE)	3
Şeref Eroğlu (TUR)	5^{F}
Mkhitar Manukyan (KAZ)	3

Gold medal match
Farid Mansurov (AZE)	4
Şeref Eroğlu (TUR)	3
Bronze medal match
Jimmy Samuelsson (SWE)	1
Mkhitar Manukyan (KAZ)	8

Classification 5–6
Kim In-sub (KOR)	D
Parviz Zeidvand (IRI)	D

== Final standing ==
Rank	Athlete
1st place, gold medalist(s)	Farid Mansurov (AZE)
2nd place, silver medalist(s)	Şeref Eroğlu (TUR)
3rd place, bronze medalist(s)	Mkhitar Manukyan (KAZ)
4	Jimmy Samuelsson (SWE)
5	Armen Vardanyan (UKR)
6	Konstantinos Arkoudeas (GRE)
7	Jannis Zamanduridis (GER)
8	Vaghinak Galstyan (ARM)
9	Maksim Semenov (RUS)
10	Luis Izquierdo (COL)
11	Kanatbek Begaliev (KGZ)
12	Oscar Wood (USA)
13	Juan Marén (CUB)
14	Nikolay Gergov (BUL)
15	Levente Füredy (HUN)
16	Moisés Sánchez (ESP)
17	Ryszard Wolny (POL)
DQ	Manuchar Kvirkvelia (GEO)
DQ	Parviz Zeidvand (IRI)
DQ	Kim In-sub (KOR)

- Manuchar Kvirkvelia was ejected from the competition for unsportsmanlike conduct after he started a brawl following the end of his first round bout with Şeref Eroğlu.
- Kim In-sub and Parviz Zeidvand were disqualified after they both failed to appear for the fifth-place match.
