= 2006 World Wrestling Championships – Men's Greco-Roman 66 kg =

Men's Greco-Roman 66 kg

Men's Greco-Roman 66 kg at the 2006 World Championships
- Venue: Tianhe Gymnasium
- Dates: 25 September 2006
- Competitors: 32 from 32 nations

Medalists
gold medal	Li Yanyan	China
silver medal	Kanatbek Begaliev	Kyrgyzstan
bronze medal	Sergey Kovalenko	Russia
bronze medal	Justin Lester	United States

The men's Greco-Roman 66 kilograms is a competition featured at the 2006 World Wrestling Championships, and was held at the Tianhe Gymnasium in Guangzhou, China on 25 September 2006.

This Greco-Roman wrestling competition consists of a single-elimination tournament, with a repechage used to determine the winner of two bronze medals.

== Results ==
Legend

- F — Won by fall
- WO — Won by walkover

=== Final ===
Final
Li Yanyan (CHN)	6	0	5
Kanatbek Begaliev (KGZ)	0	5	4

=== Top half ===
Round of 32
Aleksandr Kazakevič (LTU)	2	3
Rim Un-sik (PRK)	0	0
Matti Kautto (FIN)	W	O
Franson Gibbons (PLW)
Markus Thätner (GER)	3	0
Tomáš Sobecký (CZE)	3	6
Li Yanyan (CHN)	5	2	4
Oleksandr Khvoshch (UKR)	0	4	0
Eamonn Dorgan (IRL)	2	0
Ravshan Ruzikulov (UZB)	5	5
Sergey Kovalenko (RUS)	5	6
Beibit Nugumanov (KAZ)	0	0
Ion Panait (ROM)	6	3
Masaki Imuro (JPN)	0	0
Vitaly Zhuk (BLR)	2	0	1
Alain Milián (CUB)	1	2	5

Round of 16
Aleksandr Kazakevič (LTU)	1	2
Matti Kautto (FIN)	1	1
Tomáš Sobecký (CZE)	0	2
Li Yanyan (CHN)	4	3
Ravshan Ruzikulov (UZB)	2	0	0
Sergey Kovalenko (RUS)	1	6	4
Ion Panait (ROM)	2	3
Alain Milián (CUB)	0	0

Quarterfinals
Aleksandr Kazakevič (LTU)	0	3	0
Li Yanyan (CHN)	6	1	4
Sergey Kovalenko (RUS)	3	3
Ion Panait (ROM)	2	2

Semifinals
Li Yanyan (CHN)	5	0	8
Sergey Kovalenko (RUS)	0	6	0

=== Bottom half ===
Round of 32
Şeref Eroğlu (TUR)	7	3
Ali Mohammadi (IRI)	0	0
Artak Harutyunyan (ARM)	7	6^{F}
Dương Đình Nam (VIE)	0	0
Moisés Sánchez (ESP)	2	0	0
Tamás Lőrincz (HUN)	1	4	2
Jimmy Samuelsson (SWE)	1	6	5
Lasha Lomadze (GEO)	2	0	0
Elbrus Mammadov (AZE)	6	6
Sylwester Charzewski (POL)	2	0
Tiziano Corriga (ITA)	0	1
Nikolay Gergov (BUL)	4	4
Justin Lester (USA)	3	5	8
Kim Min-chul (KOR)	3	4	0
Kanatbek Begaliev (KGZ)	5	6
Gurbinder Singh (IND)	0	0

Round of 16
Şeref Eroğlu (TUR)	2	4
Artak Harutyunyan (ARM)	1	0
Tamás Lőrincz (HUN)	0	5	1
Jimmy Samuelsson (SWE)	5	0	1
Elbrus Mammadov (AZE)	0	1
Nikolay Gergov (BUL)	5	1
Justin Lester (USA)	0	6	1
Kanatbek Begaliev (KGZ)	7	0	3

Quarterfinals
Şeref Eroğlu (TUR)	2	1	2
Tamás Lőrincz (HUN)	1	1	2
Nikolay Gergov (BUL)	1	5	1
Kanatbek Begaliev (KGZ)	2	3	2

Semifinals
Şeref Eroğlu (TUR)	1	5	1
Kanatbek Begaliev (KGZ)	2	0	4

=== Repechage ===
Repechage round 1
Oleksandr Khvoshch (UKR)	2	3
Tomáš Sobecký (CZE)	1	1
Gurbinder Singh (IND)	0	0
Justin Lester (USA)	6	3

Repechage round 2
Oleksandr Khvoshch (UKR)	2	6
Aleksandr Kazakevič (LTU)	1	0
Justin Lester (USA)	3	1	1
Nikolay Gergov (BUL)	0	2	1

Bronze medals
Oleksandr Khvoshch (UKR)	1	1
Sergey Kovalenko (RUS)	2	1
Justin Lester (USA)	4	4
Şeref Eroğlu (TUR)	3	3
