= 2005 World Wrestling Championships – Men's Greco-Roman 66 kg =

Men's Greco-Roman 66 kg at the 2005 World Championships
- Venue: László Papp Budapest Sports Arena
- Dates: 1 October 2005
- Competitors: 39 from 39 nations

Medalists
gold medal	Nikolay Gergov	Bulgaria
silver medal	Kim Min-chul	South Korea
bronze medal	Alain Milián	Cuba
bronze medal	Kim Kum-chol	North Korea

The men's Greco-Roman 66 kilograms is a competition featured at the 2005 World Wrestling Championships, and was held at the László Papp Budapest Sports Arena in Budapest, Hungary on 1 October 2005.

== Results ==
Legend

- C — Won by 3 cautions given to the opponent
- F — Won by fall
- WO — Won by walkover

=== Finals ===
Semifinals			Final
Armen Vardanyan (UKR)	2	0
Nikolay Gergov (BUL)	3	8	Nikolay Gergov (BUL)	2	3
Kim Kum-chol (PRK)	0	0	Husamaddin Rajabov (AZE)	1	0
Husamaddin Rajabov (AZE)	5	3

=== Top half ===
==== Section 1 ====
Round of 64

Round of 32
Artak Harutyunyan (ARM)	1	4	0
Armen Vardanyan (UKR)	2	2	3^{C}
Ion Panait (ROM)	5	2
Steeve Guénot (FRA)	0	1
Jimmy Samuelsson (SWE)	5	7
Dayanand Singh (IND)	0	0
Hovhannes Kurghinyan (NED)	0	0
Mehdi Tavakkoli (IRI)	4	4

Round of 16
Armen Vardanyan (UKR)	3	2
Ion Panait (ROM)	0	1
Jimmy Samuelsson (SWE)	1	4	2
Mehdi Tavakkoli (IRI)	3	3	0

Quarterfinals
Armen Vardanyan (UKR)	2	1	2^{C}
Jimmy Samuelsson (SWE)	1	1	0

==== Section 2 ====
Round of 64

Round of 32
Nikolay Gergov (BUL)	6	7
Damirbek Asylbek Uulu (KGZ)	2	0
Konstantinos Arkoudeas (GRE)	4	7
Paulo Gonçalves (POR)	2	0
Alain Milián (CUB)	6	9
Eamonn Dorgan (IRL)	0	0
Michael Beilin (ISR)	3	0	2
Şeref Eroğlu (TUR)	2	6	1

Round of 16
Nikolay Gergov (BUL)	W	O
Konstantinos Arkoudeas (GRE)
Alain Milián (CUB)	4	5	7
Michael Beilin (ISR)	4	0	0

Quarterfinals
Nikolay Gergov (BUL)	6	5^{C}
Alain Milián (CUB)	3	0

=== Bottom half ===
==== Section 3 ====
Round of 64

Round of 32
Julian Kwit (POL)	2	5	0
Tomáš Sobecký (CZE)	8	3	1^{C}
Levente Füredy (HUN)	3	6
Renato Migliaccio (BRA)	0	0
Juha Hiltunen (FIN)	7	0	0
Kim Kum-chol (PRK)	3	3	3
Roman Gromov (RUS)	0	0
Aleksandr Kazakevič (LTU)	7	1^{C}

Round of 16
Tomáš Sobecký (CZE)	1	1
Levente Füredy (HUN)	5	1
Kim Kum-chol (PRK)	2	0	6
Aleksandr Kazakevič (LTU)	0	2	0

Quarterfinals
Levente Füredy (HUN)	1	1
Kim Kum-chol (PRK)	1	1

==== Section 4 ====
Round of 64
Justin Lester (USA)	3	6	1
Eduard Kratz (GER)	5	2	5
Plamen Tchoukanov (AUS)	0	0
Li Yanyan (CHN)	6	6
Masaki Imuro (JPN)	4	1^{C}
Valijon Jonhurozov (UZB)	1	0
Kim Min-chul (KOR)	2	2
Valentin Ten (KAZ)	2	2
Daniel Soto (PUR)	0	0
Vitaly Zhuk (BLR)	10	4^{F}
Husamaddin Rajabov (AZE)	0	5	5
Tiziano Corriga (ITA)	3	1	1
Mukhran Machutadze (GEO)	4	1
Tudor Gaivan (MDA)	0	1

Round of 32
Mahmoud Telawi (SYR)	2	0
Eduard Kratz (GER)	3	8
Li Yanyan (CHN)	1	6	1^{C}
Masaki Imuro (JPN)	3	0	0
Kim Min-chul (KOR)	5	3
Vitaly Zhuk (BLR)	0	0
Husamaddin Rajabov (AZE)	1	6	2^{C}
Mukhran Machutadze (GEO)	1	0	0

Round of 16
Eduard Kratz (GER)	0	4	0
Li Yanyan (CHN)	7	3	3^{C}
Kim Min-chul (KOR)	1	1	2
Husamaddin Rajabov (AZE)	1	3	6

Quarterfinals
Li Yanyan (CHN)	0	3
Husamaddin Rajabov (AZE)	5	4

=== Repechage ===
Repechage round 1
Tiziano Corriga (ITA)	0	4	0
Mukhran Machutadze (GEO)	8	2	3

Repechage round 2
Damirbek Asylbek Uulu (KGZ)	W	O
Konstantinos Arkoudeas (GRE)
Mukhran Machutadze (GEO)	0	1
Kim Min-chul (KOR)	3	1

Repechage round 3
Damirbek Asylbek Uulu (KGZ)	0	3	0
Alain Milián (CUB)	4	0	3^{F}
Kim Min-chul (KOR)	6	4^{C}
Li Yanyan (CHN)	1	0

Bronze medals
Alain Milián (CUB)	1	4	6^{C}
Armen Vardanyan (UKR)	1	3	0
Kim Min-chul (KOR)	0	1	2
Kim Kum-chol (PRK)	2	1	0

- Husamaddin Rajabov of Azerbaijan originally won the silver medal, but was disqualified after he tested positive for doping. Kim Min-chul was upgraded to the silver medal and Kim Kum-chol was raised to third and took the bronze medal.
