= 2007 World Wrestling Championships – Men's Greco-Roman 66 kg =

Men's Greco-Roman 66 kg at the 2007 World Championships
- Venue: Heydar Aliyev Sports and Concert Complex
- Dates: 17 September 2007
- Competitors: 42 from 42 nations

Medalists
gold medal	Farid Mansurov	Azerbaijan
silver medal	Steeve Guénot	France
bronze medal	Nikolay Gergov	Bulgaria
bronze medal	Justin Lester	United States

The men's Greco-Roman 66 kilograms is a competition featured at the 2007 World Wrestling Championships, and was held at the Heydar Aliyev Sports and Concert Complex in Baku, Azerbaijan on 17 September 2007.

== Results ==
Legend

- F — Won by fall

=== Finals ===
Semifinals				Final
Arman Adikyan (ARM)	4	1	1
Steeve Guénot (FRA)	0	1	2	Steeve Guénot (FRA)	1	1
Justin Lester (USA)	3	1		Farid Mansurov (AZE)	1	2
Farid Mansurov (AZE)	6	4

=== Top half ===
==== Section 1 ====
Round of 64

Round of 32
Masaki Imuro (JPN)	2	0
Arman Adikyan (ARM)	3	5
Kanatbek Begaliev (KGZ)	8	6
Hamza Louati (TUN)	1	0
Oleksandr Khvoshch (UKR)	6	5^{F}
Cristian Nova (BOL)	0	0
Sylwester Charzewski (POL)	3	6
Tiziano Corriga (ITA)	0	0

Round of 16
Arman Adikyan (ARM)	1	0	2
Kanatbek Begaliev (KGZ)	1	3	0
Oleksandr Khvoshch (UKR)	6	4
Sylwester Charzewski (POL)	0	0

Quarterfinals
Arman Adikyan (ARM)	3	3
Oleksandr Khvoshch (UKR)	0	0

==== Section 2 ====
Round of 64

Round of 32
Darkhan Bayakhmetov (KAZ)	7	6
Mohamed Serir (ALG)	0	0
Sunil Kumar Rana (IND)	0	0
Steeve Guénot (FRA)	5	6
Ambako Vachadze (RUS)	2	1	0
Nikolay Gergov (BUL)	0	1	2
Yesid Meneses (COL)	1	1
Ravshan Ruzikulov (UZB)	4	8

Round of 16
Darkhan Bayakhmetov (KAZ)	1	3	0
Steeve Guénot (FRA)	2	0	2
Nikolay Gergov (BUL)	1	6
Ravshan Ruzikulov (UZB)	1	0

Quarterfinals
Steeve Guénot (FRA)	2	1	3
Nikolay Gergov (BUL)	0	1	0

=== Bottom half ===
==== Section 3 ====
Round of 64
Justin Lester (USA)	7	6
Juha Hiltunen (FIN)	0	0
Aleksandar Maksimović (SRB)	1	1
Şeref Eroğlu (TUR)	3	1

Round of 32
Pak Su-in (PRK)	2	3
Gievgkeni Pentorets (GRE)	1	0
Vitaly Zhuk (BLR)	0	1
Ionel Puşcaşu (ROU)	5	6
Mailín Consuegra (CUB)	2	1	5
Aleksandr Kazakevič (LTU)	1	1	0
Justin Lester (USA)	3	3
Şeref Eroğlu (TUR)	2	0

Round of 16
Pak Su-in (PRK)	0	0
Ionel Puşcaşu (ROU)	7	6
Mailín Consuegra (CUB)	1	0
Justin Lester (USA)	1	3

Quarterfinals
Ionel Puşcaşu (ROU)	0	1
Justin Lester (USA)	6	3

==== Section 4 ====
Round of 64
Markus Thätner (GER)	1	0
Jimmy Samuelsson (SWE)	1	2
Tudor Gaivan (MDA)	3	4
Aus Abbas (IRQ)	0	0
Farid Mansurov (AZE)	6	5
Endrix Arteaga (VEN)	0	0
Moisés Sánchez (ESP)	7	5
Franson Gibbons (PLW)	0	0
Tomáš Sobecký (CZE)	0	1
Tamás Lőrincz (HUN)	4	2
Aldo Parimango (PER)	1	0	2
Ýazgeldi Kadyrow (TKM)	1	7	2
Lasha Lomadze (GEO)	2	0	0
Li Yanyan (CHN)	1	2	3
Ali Mohammadi (IRI)	2	4
Yun Jong-gyu (KOR)	0	0

Round of 32
Jimmy Samuelsson (SWE)	1	1
Tudor Gaivan (MDA)	1	1
Farid Mansurov (AZE)	3	5
Moisés Sánchez (ESP)	0	0
Tamás Lőrincz (HUN)	6	4
Ýazgeldi Kadyrow (TKM)	0	0
Li Yanyan (CHN)	1	0
Ali Mohammadi (IRI)	1	3

Round of 16
Jimmy Samuelsson (SWE)	0	1
Farid Mansurov (AZE)	6	2
Tamás Lőrincz (HUN)	5^{F}
Ali Mohammadi (IRI)	0

Quarterfinals
Farid Mansurov (AZE)	3	2
Tamás Lőrincz (HUN)	0	0

=== Repechage ===
Repechage round 1
Endrix Arteaga (VEN)	1	4	3
Moisés Sánchez (ESP)	3	2	0

Repechage round 2
Sunil Kumar Rana (IND)	0	1
Darkhan Bayakhmetov (KAZ)	3	1
Endrix Arteaga (VEN)	1	0	1
Jimmy Samuelsson (SWE)	1	3	1

Repechage round 3
Darkhan Bayakhmetov (KAZ)	0	5	0
Nikolay Gergov (BUL)	4	4	6
Endrix Arteaga (VEN)	0	1
Tamás Lőrincz (HUN)	5	1

Bronze medals
Nikolay Gergov (BUL)	0	2	3^{F}
Arman Adikyan (ARM)	6	1	0
Tamás Lőrincz (HUN)	1	1
Justin Lester (USA)	3	2
