= 2021 Veterans World Wrestling Championships =

- Location: Greece, Loutraki
- Dates: 19–24 October 2021

The 2021 Veterans World Wrestling Championships was held from 19 to 24 April 2021 in Loutraki, Greece.

The competition will be held in the following age categories:

- Division " A " 35 – 40 years
- Division " B " 41 – 45 years
- Division " C " 46 – 50 years
- Division " D " 51 – 55 years
- Division " E " 56 – 60 years

The weight categories are as follows:

- 55 – 62 kg
- 70 kg
- 78 kg
- 88 kg
- 100 kg
- 100 – 130 kg

== Medal table ==
* Host nation (Greece)

Rank	Nation	Gold	Silver	Bronze	Total
1	Russia	13	14	17	44
2	United States	8	9	12	29
3	Iran	8	5	10	23
4	Sweden	5	1	8	14
5	Poland	3	3	3	9
6	Georgia	3	2	5	10
7	Egypt	3	2	1	6
8	Kazakhstan	2	3	4	9
9	Hungary	2	2	4	8
10	France	2	1	12	15
11	Kyrgyzstan	2	1	1	4
12	Turkey	1	3	8	12
13	Greece*	1	1	4	6
14	Bulgaria	1	1	3	5
15	Italy	1	1	1	3
16	Belarus	1	1	0	2
17	Moldova	1	0	3	4
18	Finland	1	0	1	2
18	Serbia	1	0	1	2
20	Spain	1	0	0	1
21	Germany	0	2	6	8
22	Latvia	0	1	2	3
22	Ukraine	0	1	2	3
24	Azerbaijan	0	1	1	2
24	Czech Republic	0	1	1	2
24	Norway	0	1	1	2
27	Romania	0	1	0	1
27	Switzerland	0	1	0	1
29	Uzbekistan	0	0	1	1
Totals (29 entries)		60	59	112	231

== Men's freestyle ==
=== Veterans A ===
Event	Gold	Silver	Bronze
62 kg	Mostafa Hassan Mohamed; Egypt	Michael Nesseler; Germany	Not Awarded
70 kg	Reece Humphrey; United States	Jordin Humphrey; United States	Viktor Banzaraktsaev; Russia
70 kg	Reece Humphrey; United States	Jordin Humphrey; United States	Timur Shanbaev; Kazakhstan
78 kg	Renat Ramazanov; Russia	Eldar Gaydarov; Russia	Aslambek Ezerkhanov; Russia
78 kg	Renat Ramazanov; Russia	Eldar Gaydarov; Russia	Alexandru Burca; Moldova
88 kg	Bulat Guro Dashinimaev; Russia	Roman Sarybaev; Kyrgyzstan	James Medeiros II; United States
88 kg	Bulat Guro Dashinimaev; Russia	Roman Sarybaev; Kyrgyzstan	Magomedmirza Taurovski; Russia
100 kg	Saber Emamgholipourarmaki; Iran	Arayik Gevorgyan; Russia	Shahab Tayeb Moeinifar; Iran
100 kg	Saber Emamgholipourarmaki; Iran	Arayik Gevorgyan; Russia	Burak Kaya; Turkey
130 kg	Hossein Tamaddoni Kenari; Iran	Mohamed Omara; Egypt	Ismail Ozdamirov; Russia
130 kg	Hossein Tamaddoni Kenari; Iran	Mohamed Omara; Egypt	Rustam Gereikhanov; Russia

=== Veterans B ===
Event	Gold	Silver	Bronze
62 kg	Ramazan Medzhidov; Russia	Aidyn Irgit; Russia	David Yi; United States
62 kg	Ramazan Medzhidov; Russia	Aidyn Irgit; Russia	Givi Sikharulidze; Georgia
70 kg	Amiran Tsikvadze; Georgia	Aslan Kaitov; Russia	Rashid Isakov; Russia
70 kg	Amiran Tsikvadze; Georgia	Aslan Kaitov; Russia	Dennis Wymer; United States
78 kg	Magomedgadzhi Magomedov; Russia	Csaba Fazakas; Romania	Genadi Piliev; Russia
78 kg	Magomedgadzhi Magomedov; Russia	Csaba Fazakas; Romania	Oleksii Polosenko; Ukraine
88 kg	Mateusz Gucman; Poland	Dmitrii Darmodekhin; Russia	Mukhamed Shebzukhov; Russia
88 kg	Mateusz Gucman; Poland	Dmitrii Darmodekhin; Russia	Mohamed Atfet Ahmed; Egypt
100 kg	Krzysztof Czerczak; Poland	Hamza Ergut; Turkey	Mehmed Kodakov; Bulgaria
100 kg	Krzysztof Czerczak; Poland	Hamza Ergut; Turkey	Serik Amanshiyev; Kazakhstan
130 kg	Leif Eddy Bengtsson; Sweden	Avraam Papadopoulos; Greece	Apostolos Stamos; Greece
130 kg	Leif Eddy Bengtsson; Sweden	Avraam Papadopoulos; Greece	Joseph Bellavia; United States

=== Veterans C ===
Event	Gold	Silver	Bronze
62 kg	Robinson Prebish; United States	Pascal Jungo; Switzerland	Dirk Methfessel; Germany
62 kg	Robinson Prebish; United States	Pascal Jungo; Switzerland	Gary Lee Cook; United States
70 kg	Reza Bahnamiri; Iran	Mayis Ibadov; Azerbaijan	Stefan Pentschew; Germany
70 kg	Reza Bahnamiri; Iran	Mayis Ibadov; Azerbaijan	Alexey Tryasunov; Russia
78 kg	Mohammad Ahmadi Afshar; Spain	Brett Allen Rainey; United States	Thomas Donahue; United States
78 kg	Mohammad Ahmadi Afshar; Spain	Brett Allen Rainey; United States	Farhad Enjileh; Iran
88 kg	Emzarios Bentinidis; Greece	Octavius Bellamy; United States	Tomas Tobola; Czech Republic
88 kg	Emzarios Bentinidis; Greece	Octavius Bellamy; United States	Igor Gavrylets; Ukraine
100 kg	Eldar Kurtanidze; Georgia	Ali Sabour; Iran	Aydın Halimoğlu; Turkey
100 kg	Eldar Kurtanidze; Georgia	Ali Sabour; Iran	Igors Samusonoks; Latvia
130 kg	Mükerrem Yenici; Turkey	János Szlávik; Hungary	Gregory Conn; United States

=== Veterans D ===
Event	Gold	Silver	Bronze
62 kg	Marat Kicheev; Russia	Remzi Osman; Bulgaria	Gheorghe Bistritchi; Moldova
70 kg	Stephen Horton; United States	Vadim Danilov; Russia	Shamshe Tlashadze; Georgia
70 kg	Stephen Horton; United States	Vadim Danilov; Russia	Umaraskhab Magomedov; Russia
78 kg	Jon Walter Banko; United States	Lech Szczesniak; Poland	Osman Önder; Turkey
88 kg	Hassan Ali Jafariyan; Iran	Jeffery Anderson; United States	Evgeny Lisitsa; Russia
88 kg	Hassan Ali Jafariyan; Iran	Jeffery Anderson; United States	Karim Hammiche; France
100 kg	Chynarbek Izabekov; Kyrgyzstan	Adam Chojnacki; Poland	Farzad Helali; Iran
130 kg	Abdurashid Bagavdinov; Russia	Not Awarded	Not Awarded

=== Veterans E ===
Event	Gold	Silver	Bronze
62 kg	Boris Savva; Moldova	Roger Papotto; France	Abdujalil Abdurakhmanov; Uzbekistan
62 kg	Boris Savva; Moldova	Roger Papotto; France	Winfried Hoefflich; Germany
70 kg	Talant Begaliev; Kyrgyzstan	Michael Madry; United States	Domenico Piccinini; Italy
70 kg	Talant Begaliev; Kyrgyzstan	Michael Madry; United States	Sandor Pali; Hungary
78 kg	Turpalali Sulimanov; Kazakhstan	Malkhaz Rozomashvili; Georgia	Imre Timar; Hungary
88 kg	Gyula Lakatos; Hungary	Petros Petrosyan; United States	Radislav Navazhap; Russia
88 kg	Gyula Lakatos; Hungary	Petros Petrosyan; United States	Ayhan Özdemir; Turkey
100 kg	Igor Zadnepryannyy; Kazakhstan	Idris Iasulov; Russia	Joseph Cattan; United States
130 kg	Daniel Chaid; United States	JBrian Jones; United States	Rovshan Ismayilkhanli; Azerbaijan
130 kg	Daniel Chaid; United States	JBrian Jones; United States	Saadanbek Niiazov; Kyrgyzstan

== Men's Greco-Roman ==
=== Veterans A ===
Event	Gold	Silver	Bronze
62 kg	Mostafa Hassan Mohamed; Egypt	Daniyar Ray; Kazakhstan	Jarkko Wester; Sweden
70 kg	Reece Humphrey; United States	Gevorg Tonoyan; Russia	Mohammad Moradi; Iran
70 kg	Reece Humphrey; United States	Gevorg Tonoyan; Russia	Azamat Satybaldiyev; Kazakhstan
78 kg	Arzu Pirmetov; Russia	Vitali Murashka; Belarus	Eric Buisson; France
78 kg	Arzu Pirmetov; Russia	Vitali Murashka; Belarus	Dumitru Popov; Moldova
88 kg	Saber Tabar; Iran	Valeriy Golubkov; Russia	Andrey Samokhin; Kazakhstan
88 kg	Saber Tabar; Iran	Valeriy Golubkov; Russia	Robin Liljegren; Sweden
100 kg	Zsolt Dajka; Hungary	Guglielmo Cecca; Italy	Ilias Boukis; Greece
100 kg	Zsolt Dajka; Hungary	Guglielmo Cecca; Italy	Vladimir Pshenichnyy; Russia
130 kg	Saleh Moustafa Omara; Egypt	Mahdi Ahmad Noori; Iran	Ronald Dombkowski II; United States
130 kg	Saleh Moustafa Omara; Egypt	Mahdi Ahmad Noori; Iran	Zaza Shavadze; Georgia

=== Veterans B ===
Event	Gold	Silver	Bronze
62 kg	David Yi; United States	Daniel Franke; Germany	Svetoslav Georgiev; Bulgaria
70 kg	Milan Maric; Serbia	Andrejs Drozdovs; Latvia	Aleksei Kotov; Russia
70 kg	Milan Maric; Serbia	Andrejs Drozdovs; Latvia	Ehsan Moazami Goudarzi; Iran
78 kg	Jimmy Samuelsson; Sweden	Eduard Durmanov; Kazakhstan	Denis Bakai; Russia
78 kg	Jimmy Samuelsson; Sweden	Eduard Durmanov; Kazakhstan	David Gugunashvili; Georgia
88 kg	Naser Rahimali Soleymani; Iran	Mohamed Atfet Ahmed; Egypt	Wojciech Wolowicz; Poland
88 kg	Naser Rahimali Soleymani; Iran	Mohamed Atfet Ahmed; Egypt	Behzad Nourollah Abdolvand; Iran
100 kg	Yuliyan Georgiev; Bulgaria	Zurab Tsikaridze; Georgia	Stanislavs Samota; Latvia
100 kg	Yuliyan Georgiev; Bulgaria	Zurab Tsikaridze; Georgia	Omid Mosavi; Sweden
130 kg	Leif Bengtsson; Sweden	Roohollah Ghalavand; Iran	Vitalii Kuznetcov; Russia

=== Veterans C ===
Event	Gold	Silver	Bronze
62 kg	Farokh Hodei; Iran	Nurzhan Nurbekov; Kazakhstan	Nuno Berlinda; Sweden
70 kg	Djamel Ainaoui; France	Mose Chaknelidze; Ukraine	Andrei Shchigolev; Russia
70 kg	Djamel Ainaoui; France	Mose Chaknelidze; Ukraine	Vasilis Boukis; Greece
78 kg	Johan Mikael Hedberg; Sweden	Yury Bursin; Russia	Nurettin Aras; Turkey
78 kg	Johan Mikael Hedberg; Sweden	Yury Bursin; Russia	Badri Antadze; Georgia
88 kg	Octavius Bellamy; United States	Tomas Tobola; Czech Republic	Vasileios Batalas; Greece
88 kg	Octavius Bellamy; United States	Tomas Tobola; Czech Republic	Seyedhossein Sadati; Iran
100 kg	Vasilii Iuvkin; Russia	Tom Ljosaak; Norway	Jamshid Mostafaei; Iran
130 kg	Bahaaldin Karimzadeh; Iran	Rafal Koszowski; Poland	Gyula Papp; Hungary
130 kg	Bahaaldin Karimzadeh; Iran	Rafal Koszowski; Poland	Gregory Conn; United States

=== Veterans D ===
Event	Gold	Silver	Bronze
62 kg	Terho Petteri Kettunen; Finland	Vasilii Bashpakov; Russia	Ilkka Tapio Uhlbaeck; Finland
62 kg	Terho Petteri Kettunen; Finland	Vasilii Bashpakov; Russia	Jacek Marian Kusmierek; Poland
70 kg	Tariel Shavadze; Georgia	Stephen Horton; United States	Ömer Topal; Turkey
70 kg	Tariel Shavadze; Georgia	Stephen Horton; United States	Lars Mikael Dahl; Sweden
78 kg	Anders Roger Sjoeqvist; Sweden	Ercan Ayyıldız; Turkey	Jon Walter Banko; United States
78 kg	Anders Roger Sjoeqvist; Sweden	Ercan Ayyıldız; Turkey	Osman Önder; Turkey
88 kg	Oleg Uglanov; Russia	Alexander Sergeev; Russia	Martin Inge Dalsbotten; Norway
88 kg	Oleg Uglanov; Russia	Alexander Sergeev; Russia	Jerzy Sekura; Poland
100 kg	Mohammed El Haddad; France	Gelu Bors; United States	Detlef Hein John; Germany
100 kg	Mohammed El Haddad; France	Gelu Bors; United States	Zeljko Jovisic; Serbia
130 kg	Abdurashid Bagavdinov; Russia	Ferenc Laszlo Nedbalek; Hungary	Istvan Bela Dezsereczky; Hungary

=== Veterans E ===
Event	Gold	Silver	Bronze
62 kg	Valerii Kharlakov; Russia	Igor Chuev; Russia	Mehmet Kenan Bektaş; Turkey
62 kg	Valerii Kharlakov; Russia	Igor Chuev; Russia	Winfried Thomas Hoeflich; Germany
70 kg	Domenico Piccinini; Italy	Andrei Savin; Russia	Lars Christer Jacobson; Sweden
70 kg	Domenico Piccinini; Italy	Andrei Savin; Russia	Sandor Pali; Hungary
78 kg	Kanstantsin Kemau; Belarus	Rasoul Esrafil Atashi; Iran	Dieter Uwe Hemmann; Germany
78 kg	Kanstantsin Kemau; Belarus	Rasoul Esrafil Atashi; Iran	Ghasem Sefid; Iran
88 kg	Gennadii Ovdin; Russia	Ulf Stefan Edvardsson; Sweden	Gert Ove Pettersson; Sweden
88 kg	Gennadii Ovdin; Russia	Ulf Stefan Edvardsson; Sweden	Ali Mirza Varmazyar; Iran
100 kg	Yuri Dyukov; Russia	Zeki Bayraktar; Turkey	Ari Ensio Markkola; Sweden
100 kg	Yuri Dyukov; Russia	Zeki Bayraktar; Turkey	Valentin Georgiev; Bulgaria
130 kg	Andrzej Wroński; Poland	Ardeshir Poorhekmat; Iran	Brian Alan Jones; United States
