= Maksim Semenov =

Maksim Semenov may refer to:

- Maxim Semyonov (born 1984), Kazakhstani ice hockey defenceman
- Maksim Semenov (wrestler) (born 1979), Russian Greco-Roman wrestler
