= Parviz Zeidvand =

Iranian Greco-Roman wrestler

Personal information
- Full name: Parviz Zeidvand
- Nationality: Iran
- Born: 16 August 1980 (age 45) Khorramshahr, Iran
- Height: 1.72 m (5 ft 7 1/2 in)
- Weight: 66 kg (146 lb)

Sport
- Style: Greco-Roman
- Club: Rahahan Wrestling Club
- Coach: Gholamreza Ghetassi
Medal record
Men's Greco-Roman wrestling
Representing Iran
Asian Games
Bronze medal – third place	2002 Busan	74 kg
Asian Championships
Gold medal – first place	2001 Ulan Bator	69 kg
Gold medal – first place	2003 New Delhi	66 kg
Silver medal – second place	2000 Seoul	69 kg

Parviz Zeidvand (Persian: پرويز زيدوند; born August 16, 1980, in Khorramshahr) is a retired amateur Iranian Greco-Roman wrestler, who competed in the men's welterweight category. He won two gold medals at the Asian Championships (2001 and 2003), picked up a bronze in the 74-kg division at the 2002 Asian Games in Busan, South Korea, and represented Iran in two editions of the Olympic Games (2000 and 2004). Throughout his sporting career, Zeidvand trained full-time for Rahahan Wrestling Club under his coach and mentor Gholamreza Ghetassi.

Zeidvand made his official debut at the 2000 Summer Olympics in Sydney, where he competed in the men's welterweight category (69 kg). He lost two straight matches each to Azerbaijan's Islam Dugushiev (5–0) and Finland's Juha Lappalainen (2–1), leaving him on the bottom of the prelim pool and placing sixteenth in the final standings.

After his first Olympics, Zeidvand proved particularly successful in his career with two gold medals in both 66 and 69-kg division at the Asian Championships (2001 and 2003). Fighting at five pounds heavier than in his early 2000s, Zeidvand picked up a bronze over Uzbek wrestler and 2000 Olympian Ruslan Biktyakov in the men's 74 kg category at the 2002 Asian Games in Busan, South Korea.

At the 2004 Summer Olympics in Athens, Zeidvand qualified for his second Iranian squad, as a 24-year-old, in the men's 66 kg class. Earlier in the process, he finished second at the Olympic Qualification Tournament in Novi Sad, Serbia and Montenegro to guarantee his spot on the Iranian wrestling team. Redeeming from his previous Olympic setback, Zeidvand dominated the prelim pool with two powerful verdicts over Kyrgyzstan's Kanatbek Begaliev (5–0) and Spain's Moisés Sánchez (3–1) to secure his place for the next round. Zeidvand kept his Iranian squad wrecking with a grueling 2–1 defeat to Azerbaijan's Farid Mansurov in the quarterfinal match. For refusing to appear in the fifth-place match, Zeidvand, along with reigning Olympic silver medalist Kim In-Sub of South Korea, were disqualified from the tournament and thereby received a lifetime ban from the sport by the International Federation of Associated Wrestling (FILA).
