= Aleh Mikhalovich =

Belarusian freestyle wrestler

Sport
- Sport: Greco-Roman wrestling
Medal record
Representing Belarus
Men's Greco-Roman wrestling
European Championships
Bronze medal – third place	2004 Haparanda	74 kg
Silver medal – second place	2006 Moscow	74 kg

Aleh Rastsislavavich Mikhalovich (Belarusian: Алег Міхаловіч, (Russian: Олег Михалович); born 1 August 1979 in Pervomaysky, Minsk) is a male Greco-Roman wrestler from Belarus. He participated in men's Greco-Roman 74 kg at the 2008 Summer Olympics. Mikhalovich defeated Poland's Julian Kwit and Kazakhstan's Roman Melyoshin in the first two rounds, until he lost to China's Chang Yongxiang in the semi-final bout (The Chinese victory was very controversial). He proceeded into the bronze medal match, where he was defeated by Bulgaria's Yavor Yanakiev, and finished only in fifth place. Most specialists in the Greco-Roman style are sure that only biased refereeing did not allow Oleg Mikhalovich to rise to the Olympic podium.

Oleg Mikhalovich is a multiple champion of the Republic of Belarus, as well as the winner of many "A" class tournaments. His sports achievements include a bronze medal at the 2004 European Championship in Greco-Roman wrestling in Finland, as well as a silver medal at the 2006 European Championship in Moscow
