= Wrestling at the 2008 Summer Olympics – Men's Greco-Roman 74 kg =

Men's Greco-Roman 74 kg at the Games of the XXIX Olympiad
- Venue: China Agricultural University Gymnasium
- Date: 13 August 2008
- Competitors: 20 from 20 nations

Medalists
1st place, gold medalist(s)		Manuchar Kvirkvelia	Georgia
2nd place, silver medalist(s)		Chang Yongxiang	China
3rd place, bronze medalist(s)		Yavor Yanakiev	Bulgaria
3rd place, bronze medalist(s)		Christophe Guénot	France

Men's Greco-Roman 74 kilograms competition at the 2008 Summer Olympics in Beijing, China, was held on August 13 at the China Agricultural University Gymnasium.

This Greco-Roman wrestling competition consists of a single-elimination tournament, with a repechage used to determine the winner of two bronze medals. The two finalists face off for gold and silver medals. Each wrestler who loses to one of the two finalists moves into the repechage, culminating in a pair of bronze medal matches featuring the semifinal losers each facing the remaining repechage opponent from their half of the bracket.

Each bout consists of up to three rounds, lasting two minutes apiece. The wrestler who scores more points in each round is the winner of that rounds; the bout ends when one wrestler has won two rounds (and thus the match).

== Schedule ==
All times are China Standard Time (UTC+08:00)

Date	Time	Event
13 August 2008	09:30	Qualification rounds
13 August 2008	16:00	Repechage
13 August 2008	17:00	Finals

== Results ==
Legend

- F — Won by fall

=== Final ===
Final
Chang Yongxiang (CHN)	0	0
Manuchar Kvirkvelia (GEO)	7	3

=== Top half ===
Qualifications

1/8 finals
Chang Yongxiang (CHN)	3	1
Yavor Yanakiev (BUL)	2	1
Sixto Barrera (PER)	1	1	1
Valdemaras Venckaitis (LTU)	2	1	1
Roman Melyoshin (KAZ)	3	1	5
Hassan Shahsavan (AUS)	0	2	0
Aleh Mikhalovich (BLR)	3	0	3
Julian Kwit (POL)	1	3	2

Quarterfinals
Chang Yongxiang (CHN)	2	7
Sixto Barrera (PER)	1	0
Roman Melyoshin (KAZ)	1	1	1
Aleh Mikhalovich (BLR)	1	1	2

Semifinals
Chang Yongxiang (CHN)	0	4	2
Aleh Mikhalovich (BLR)	6	0	1

=== Bottom half ===
Qualifications
Mark Madsen (DEN)	0	1
Varteres Samurgashev (RUS)	4	3
Ilgar Abdulov (AZE)	2	1
Şeref Tüfenk (TUR)	1	1
Arsen Julfalakyan (ARM)	1	1	1
Volodymyr Shatskykh (UKR)	1	1	1
T. C. Dantzler (USA)	1	2	0
Péter Bácsi (HUN)	5	2	3

1/8 finals
Konstantin Schneider (GER)	4	4
Messaoud Zeghdane (ALG)	1	0
Manuchar Kvirkvelia (GEO)	5	5
Christophe Guénot (FRA)	0	0
Varteres Samurgashev (RUS)	4^{F}
Ilgar Abdulov (AZE)	0
Arsen Julfalakyan (ARM)	1	4	1
Péter Bácsi (HUN)	3	4	1

Quarterfinals
Konstantin Schneider (GER)	0	0
Manuchar Kvirkvelia (GEO)	3	5
Varteres Samurgashev (RUS)	2	1
Péter Bácsi (HUN)	2	4

Semifinals
Manuchar Kvirkvelia (GEO)	2	2	3^{F}
Péter Bácsi (HUN)	1	5	0

=== Repechage ===
Repechage round 2
Yavor Yanakiev (BUL)	3	4
Sixto Barrera (PER)	0	0
Christophe Guénot (FRA)	2	2
Konstantin Schneider (GER)	1	1

Bronze medals
Yavor Yanakiev (BUL)	0	2	2
Aleh Mikhalovich (BLR)	3	0	0
Christophe Guénot (FRA)	3	0	4
Péter Bácsi (HUN)	1	4	2

== Final standing ==
Rank	Athlete
1st place, gold medalist(s)	Manuchar Kvirkvelia (GEO)
2nd place, silver medalist(s)	Chang Yongxiang (CHN)
3rd place, bronze medalist(s)	Yavor Yanakiev (BUL)
3rd place, bronze medalist(s)	Christophe Guénot (FRA)
5	Aleh Mikhalovich (BLR)
5	Péter Bácsi (HUN)
7	Varteres Samurgashev (RUS)
8	Roman Melyoshin (KAZ)
9	Konstantin Schneider (GER)
10	Arsen Julfalakyan (ARM)
11	Sixto Barrera (PER)
12	Ilgar Abdulov (AZE)
13	Julian Kwit (POL)
14	Valdemaras Venckaitis (LTU)
15	Volodymyr Shatskykh (UKR)
16	T. C. Dantzler (USA)
17	Şeref Tüfenk (TUR)
18	Hassan Shahsavan (AUS)
19	Mark Madsen (DEN)
20	Messaoud Zeghdane (ALG)
