= Maksim Semenov (wrestler) =

Russian Greco-Roman wrestler

Personal information
- Full name: Maksim Anatolyevich Semenov
- Nationality: Russia
- Born: 7 April 1979 (age 47) Tolyatti, Russian SFSR, Soviet Union
- Height: 1.74 m (5 ft 8 1/2 in)
- Weight: 66 kg (146 lb)

Sport
- Style: Greco-Roman
- Club: Torpedo Moskva
- Coach: Rerik Sadikhanov

Maksim Anatolyevich Semenov (Russian: Максим Анатольевич Семёнов; born April 7, 1979, in Tolyatti) is a retired amateur Russian Greco-Roman wrestler, who competed in the men's welterweight category. He obtained a fourth position in the 66-kg division at the 2002 World Wrestling Championships in Moscow, and also represented his nation Russia at the 2004 Summer Olympics, finishing ninth in the process. Throughout his sporting career, Semenov trained full-time for Torpedo Wrestling Club in Moscow, under his personal coach and mentor Rerik Sadikhanov.

Semenov qualified for the Russian squad in the men's 66 kg class at the 2004 Summer Olympics in Athens by filling up an entry by the International Federation of Association Wrestling and the Russian Olympic Committee through a reallocation process. He lost his opening match to Armenia's Vaghinak Galstyan by a 2–2 draw, but bounced back to defeat Sweden's Jimmy Samuelsson with a solid 3–1 decision, placing second in the prelim pool round and did not advance to the quarterfinals. Semenov originally claimed the eleventh position in the final standings, but two wrestlers were both disqualified by a forfeit in a playoff, upgrading him to ninth.
