= Luis Izquierdo =

Colombian Greco-Roman wrestler

Personal information
- Full name: Luis Fernando Izquierdo Martínez
- Nationality: Colombia
- Born: 3 April 1974 (age 52) Cali, Colombia
- Height: 1.65 m (5 ft 5 in)
- Weight: 66 kg (146 lb)

Sport
- Style: Greco-Roman
- Club: Jaime Lozada
- Coach: Jesus Benito Izquierdo
Medal record
Men's Greco-Roman wrestling
Representing Colombia
Pan American Games
Bronze medal – third place	1999 Winnipeg	69 kg
Bronze medal – third place	2003 Santo Domingo	66 kg

Luis Fernando Izquierdo Martínez (Note: In this Hispanic American name, the first or paternal surname is Izquierdo and the second or maternal family name is Martínez.) (born April 3, 1974) is a retired amateur Colombian Greco-Roman wrestler, who competed in the men's welterweight category. He has claimed two bronze medals in the 69 and 66-kg division at the Pan American Games (1999 and 2003), and also represented Colombia at the 2004 Summer Olympics. Izquierdo is also a member of Jaime Lozada Wrestling Club in his native Cali, under his personal coach and father Jesus Benito Izquierdo.

Izquierdo qualified as a lone wrestler for the Colombian squad in the men's 66 kg class at the 2004 Summer Olympics in Athens. Earlier in the process, he received a berth and rounded out the ninth spot in his respective category from the 2003 World Wrestling Championships in Créteil, France. He lost two straight matches each to Ukraine's Armen Vardanyan and Turkey's Şeref Eroğlu, both on technical superiority, but sailed smoothly with an easy victory over Georgia's Manuchar Kvirkvelia, who was immediately disqualified for infringing the rules of the tournament. Placing third in the prelim pool and twelfth overall, Izquierdo failed to advance to the quarterfinals. As two wrestlers were both disqualified by a forfeit in the fifth-place match, Izquierdo's position was upgraded to tenth.
