= Oscar Wood =

American Greco-Roman wrestler

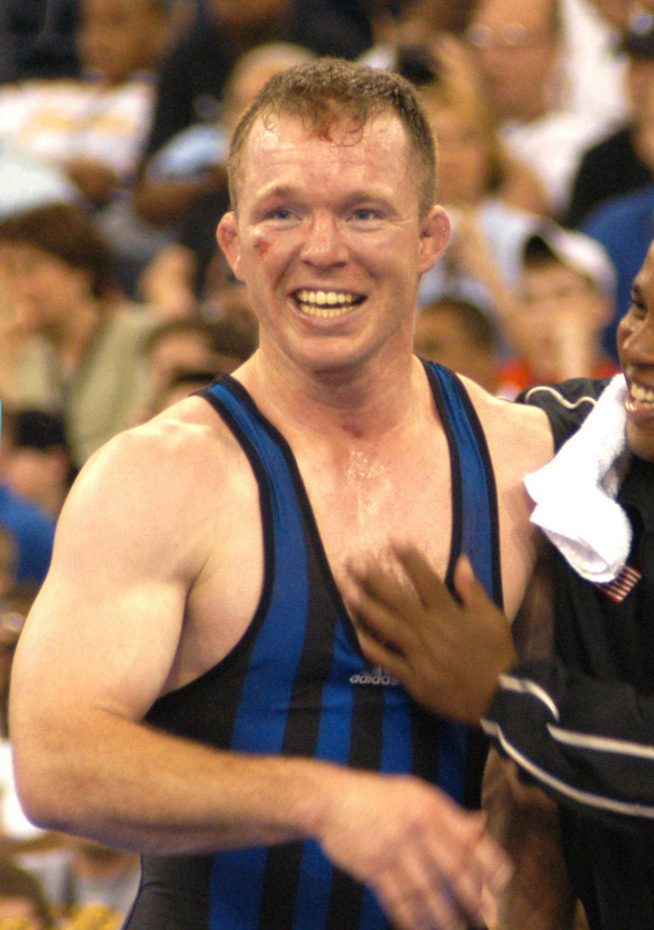
- Wood in 2004

Personal information
- Full name: Gordon Oscar Wood
- Born: June 21, 1975 (age 51) Milwaukie, Oregon, U.S.
- Height: 1.70 m (5 ft 7 in)
- Weight: 66 kg (146 lb)

Sport
- Style: Greco-Roman
- Club: U.S. Army WCAP
- College team: Oregon State
- Coach: Shon Lewis; Sam Barlow
Medal record
Men's Greco-Roman wrestling
Representing the United States
Dave Schultz Memorial International
Bronze medal – third place	2001 Colorado Springs	69 kg
Bronze medal – third place	2004 Colorado Springs	66 kg
Collegiate Wrestling
Representing the Oregon State Beavers
NCAA Division I Championships
Bronze medal – third place	1998 Cleveland	142 lb

Gordon Oscar Wood (born June 21, 1975) is an American former wrestler, who competed in the Greco-Roman welterweight category. He was a two-time NCAA All-American for the Oregon State Beavers (1996–1999), and also represented the United States at the 2004 Summer Olympics as a Greco-Roman wrestler. Serving as a staff sergeant of the United States Army in Fort Carson, Colorado, Wood also trained full time for the army's wrestling club.

== Career ==
=== Early years ===
Wood attended Sam Barlow High School in Gresham, Oregon, in the Portland metropolitan area. There, he won three state wrestling titles, with his only defeat as a freshman in the state final. He also collected four freestyle and four Greco-Roman state titles in high school.

=== College ===
Wood began his sporting career at the Oregon State University in Corvallis, Oregon, where he trained and competed for the Oregon State Beavers wrestling program under head coach Joe Wells. While wrestling for the Beavers, Wood compiled a 118–23 overall record and 51 pins throughout his duration at Oregon State (1996–2000). He placed third in the NCAA meet at 142 pounds in 1998, and seventh at 134 pounds in 1996, which resulted him to being named NCAA All-American twice. He also captured two wrestling titles in the 142 and 149-pound division at the 1998 and 1999 Pacific-10 Conference Championships. Additionally, he ranked tenth for the most number of triumphs recorded at Oregon State, fifth in career pins, and twentieth in the winning percentage on the university's all-time career leader board.

After graduating from Oregon State at the end of 1999 season, Wood decided to join the United States Army in Fort Carson, Colorado, where he served full time as a staff sergeant, and later became a member of the wrestling club under head coaches Shon Lewis and Sam Barlow.

=== Greco-Roman wrestling ===
Wood qualified for the U.S. wrestling team on his major international debut in the men's 66 kg class at the 2004 Summer Olympics. Earlier in the process, he pinned 2000 Olympian and five-time U.S. champion Kevin Bracken with a 3–0 victory to guarantee his spot on the U.S. team from the Olympic Trials.

He lost his opening match 9–3 to Greek wrestler Konstantinos Arkoudeas by the massive clamor of the home crowd inside Ano Liossia Olympic Hall, and could not rally for enough points to break a 2–2 tie and thrash Germany's Jannis Zamanduridis in the second round with a 5–2 verdict. Wood scored a single point in his final bout, but fell to Kazakhstan's Mkhitar Manukyan by a superb ten-point gap to halt the match, leaving him on the bottom of the pool and placing fourteenth in the final standings. As two wrestlers were both disqualified by a forfeit in the fifth-place match, Wood's position was upgraded to twelfth.

Wood vowed to improve his game plan and set sights for Beijing 2008 and London 2012, but he lost the berth twice to Jake Deitchler and Justin Lester, respectively at the Olympic Trials.
