= Roman Melyoshin =

Kazakhstani wrestler (born 1983)

Personal information
- Full name: Roman Sergeyevich Melyoshin
- Nationality: Kazakhstan
- Born: 23 June 1983 (age 43) Petropavl, Kazakh SSR, Soviet Union
- Height: 1.75 m (5 ft 9 in)
- Weight: 74 kg (163 lb)

Sport
- Sport: Wrestling
- Event: Greco-Roman
- Club: DYUSSCH Victoria
- Coached by: Sergey Anatolivich Yampolski
Medal record
Men's Greco-Roman wrestling
Representing Kazakhstan
Asian Games
Gold medal – first place	2006 Doha	74 kg
Asian Championships
Bronze medal – third place	2009 Pattaya	74 kg

Roman Sergeyevich Melyoshin (Kazakh: Роман Сергеевич Мелёшин; born June 23, 1983, in Petropavl) is an amateur Kazakhstani Greco-Roman wrestler, who played for the men's middleweight category. He won a gold medal for his division at the 2006 Asian Games in Doha, Qatar, and bronze at the 2009 Asian Wrestling Championships in Pattaya, Thailand.

Melyoshin represented Kazakhstan at the 2008 Summer Olympics, where he competed for the men's 74 kg class. He defeated Australia's Hassan Shahsavan in the preliminary round of sixteen, before losing out the quarterfinal match to Belarus' Aleh Mikhalovich, with a three-set technical score (1–1, 1–1, 1–2), and a classification point score of 1–3.
