= Kim Min-chul (wrestler) =

South Korean Greco-Roman wrestler

Kim Min-Chul
Personal information
- Nationality: South Korea
- Born: 4 April 1983 (age 43)
- Height: 1.73 m (5 ft 8 in)
- Weight: 66 kg (146 lb)

Sport
- Sport: Wrestling
- Event: Greco-Roman
- Club: Sung Shin Company Sportsclub
- Coached by: Kim Sung-Moon
Medal record
Men's Greco-Roman wrestling
Representing South Korea
Asian Games
Gold medal – first place	2006 Doha	66 kg
World Championships
Silver medal – second place	2005 Budapest	66 kg
Asian Championships
Gold medal – first place	2008 Jeju City	66 kg
Silver medal – second place	2011 Tashkent	66 kg

Kim Min-Chul (Korean: 김민철; born April 4, 1983) is an amateur South Korean Greco-Roman wrestler, who played for the men's welterweight category. He defeated Uzbekistan's Ravshan Ruzikulov for a gold medal in the 66 kg division at the 2006 Asian Games in Doha, Qatar. He also captured a silver medal at the 2005 World Wrestling Championships in Budapest, Hungary, losing out to Bulgaria's Nikolay Gergov in 66 kg tournament. Kim is a member of the wrestling team for Sung Shin Company Sportsclub, and is coached and trained by Kim Sung-Moon.

Kim represented South Korea at the 2008 Summer Olympics in Beijing, where he competed for the men's 66 kg class. He lost the qualifying round match by a superiority decision to Iran's Ali Mohammadi, with a two-set technical score (1–1, 1–1), and a classification point score of 1–3.
