= Sergey Kovalenko (wrestler) =

Russian Greco-Roman wrestler

Personal information
- Full name: Sergey Vladimirovich Kovalenko
- Nationality: (Russia) Russian
- Born: 25 May 1976 (age 50) Shakhty, Rostov Oblast, Russian SFSR
- Height: 1.68 m (5 ft 6 in)
- Weight: 66 kg (146 lb)

Sport
- Sport: Wrestling
- Event: Greco-Roman
- Club: SKA Saint Petersburg
- Coached by: Grigori Davidyan
Medal record
Men's Greco-Roman wrestling
Representing Russia
World Championships
Bronze medal – third place	2006 Guangzhou	66 kg
European Championships
Silver medal – second place	2006 Moscow	66 kg
Bronze medal – third place	2005 Varna	66 kg

Sergey Vladimirovich Kovalenko (Russian: Серге́й Владимирович Коваленко; born 25 May 1976) is a Russian former Greco-Roman wrestler, who played for the men's welterweight category. and currently UWW referee. He won a bronze medal for the 66 kg division at the 2006 World Wrestling Championships in Guangzhou, China. He is also a two-time medalist at the European Championships (2005 in Varna, Bulgaria and 2006 in Moscow, Russia), and a member of SKA Saint Petersburg in Saint Petersburg, under his personal coach Grigori Davidyan.

At age thirty-two, Kovalenko made his official debut for the 2008 Summer Olympics in Beijing, where he competed in the men's 66 kg class. He defeated Algeria's Mohamed Serir by a technical superiority (a score of 0–12) in the preliminary round of sixteen, before losing out the quarterfinal match to Bulgarian wrestler and 2005 World champion Nikolay Gergov, with a three-set technical score (1–2, 5–2, 1–3), and a classification point score of 1–3.
