= Ilgar Abdulov =

Azerbaijani Greco-Roman wrestler

Personal information
- Nationality: Azerbaijan
- Born: 12 March 1981 (age 45) Baku, Azerbaijan SSR
- Height: 1.75 m (5 ft 9 in)
- Weight: 74 kg (163 lb)

Sport
- Sport: Wrestling
- Event: Greco-Roman
- Club: Neftçi Baku (AZE)
- Coached by: Bakhram Milbatov (AZE)

Ilgar Abdulov (Azerbaijani: İlqar Abdulov; born May 12, 1981, in Baku) is an amateur Azerbaijani Greco-Roman wrestler, who played in the men's super heavyweight category. He is a member of Neftçi Wrestling Club in Baku, and is coached and trained by Bakhram Milbatov.

Abdulov represented his nation Azerbaijan at the 2008 Summer Olympics in Beijing, where he competed for the men's 74 kg class. He first defeated Turkey's Şeref Tüfenk in the qualifying round, before losing out his next match to Russian wrestler and former Olympic champion Varteres Samurgashev, who pinned him in the first period.
