= Suicide of Mohammad Moradi =

Iranian student (1984–2022)

Mohammad Moradi
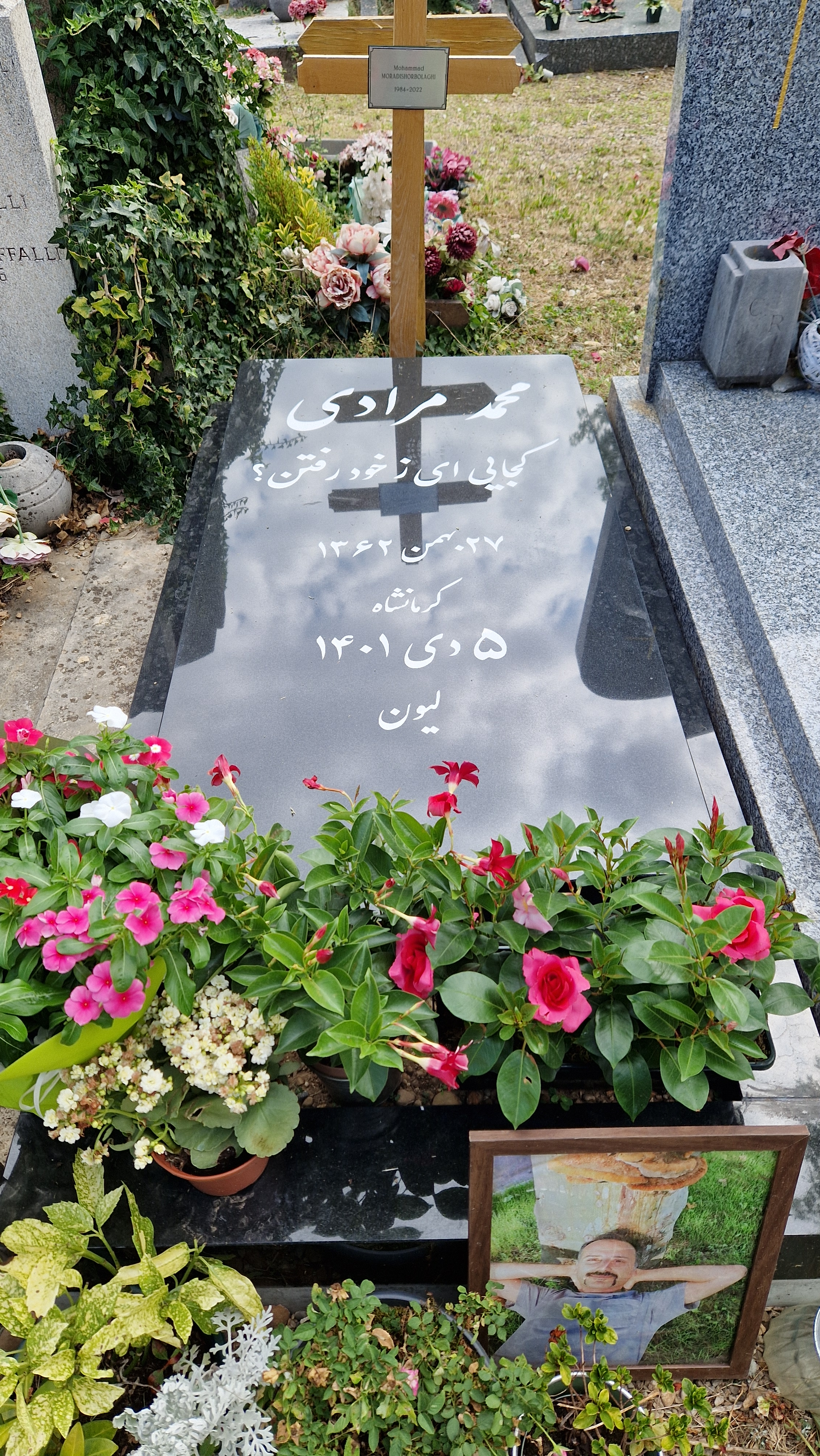
- Born: 1984; Kermanshah, Iran
- Died: 26 December 2022 (aged 38); Lyon, France
- Occupation: History student
- Known for: Committing suicide to draw attention to the Islamic Republic's behavior toward protesters

Mohammad Moradi (Persian: محمد مرادی; 1984 – 26 December 2022) was an Iranian student living in the city of Lyon, France, who threw himself into the Rhône River in protest against the widespread suppression of the 2022 uprising in Iran and with the aim of drawing global attention to the violent behavior of the Islamic Republic towards protesters.

== Personal life ==
Moradi had been married to his wife for three years; they both lived in Lyon, France.

== Motivations ==
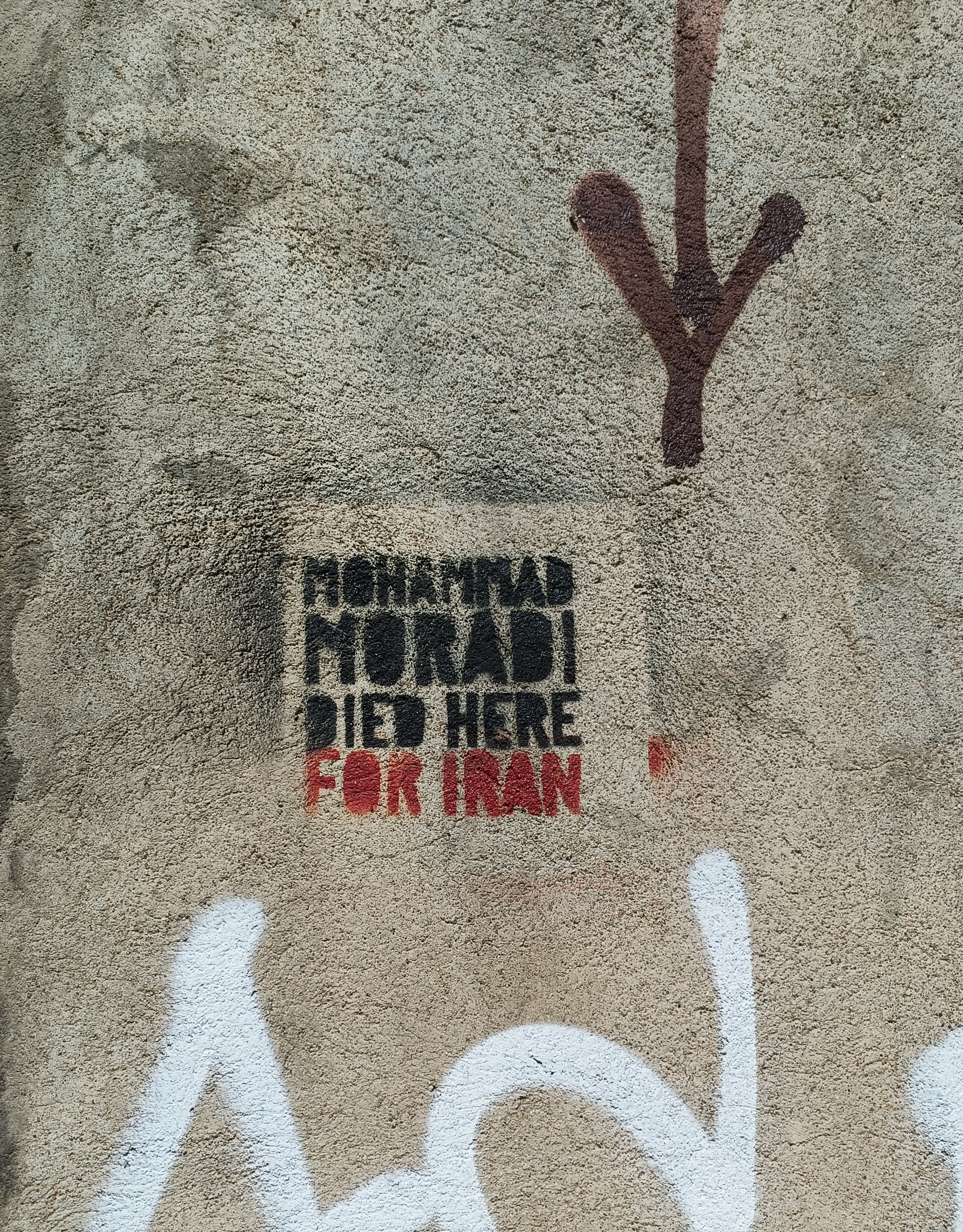
Tribute to Mohammad Moradi in Lyon (France) where he committed suicide

Before throwing himself into the Rhone river, Mohammad Moradi published two videos of himself in Persian and French. In his Persian language video, he emphasized that his purpose of committing suicide was not due to personal problems and he wanted to draw the attention of Europeans and Western people to the issue of Iran. He also added that he cannot tolerate the current miserable life both inside and outside of Iran.

== See also ==
- Mahsa Amini protests

He is buried in the Cimetière de la Guillotière in Lyon.
