= Messaoud Zeghdane =

Algerian Greco-Roman wrestler

Personal information
- Full name: Messaoud Mohammed Zeghdane
- Nationality: Algeria
- Born: 25 January 1981 (age 45)
- Height: 1.78 m (5 ft 10 in)
- Weight: 74 kg (163 lb)

Sport
- Sport: Wrestling
- Event: Greco-Roman

Messaoud Mohammed Zeghdane (Arabic: مسعود محمد زغدان; born January 25, 1981) is an amateur Algerian Greco-Roman wrestler, who played for the men's middleweight category. Zeghdane represented Algeria at the 2008 Summer Olympics in Beijing, where he competed for the men's 74 kg class. He received a bye for the preliminary round of sixteen match, before losing out to Germany's Konstantin Schneider, who was able to score four points each in two straight periods, leaving Zeghdane with a single point.
