= Jannis Zamanduridis =

German Greco-Roman wrestler

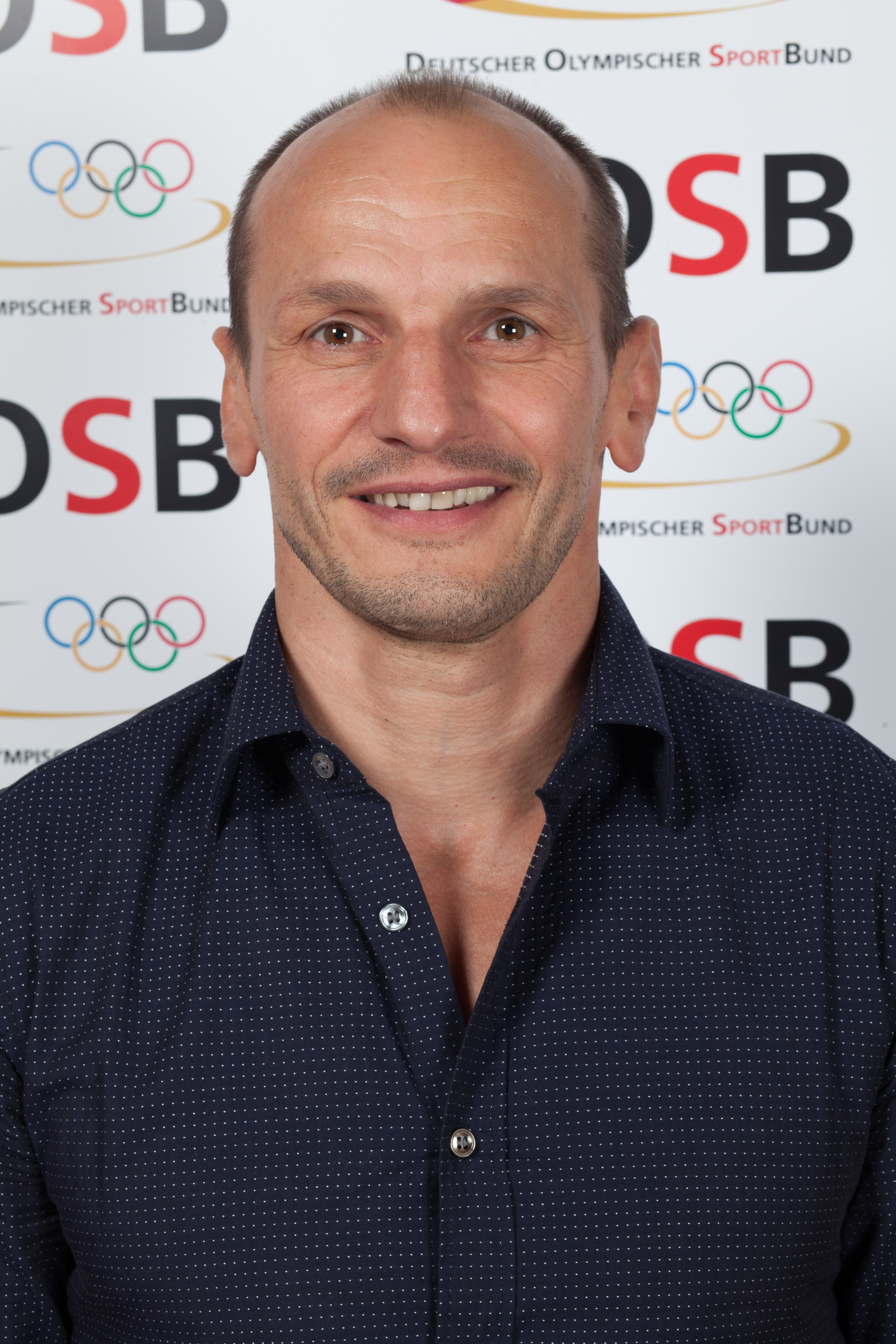

Personal information
- Full name: Jannis Zamanduridis
- Nationality: Germany
- Born: 18 March 1966 (age 60) Chemnitz, East Germany
- Height: 1.71 m (5 ft 7 1/2 in)
- Weight: 74 kg (163 lb)

Sport
- Style: Greco-Roman
- Club: KSV Köllerbach
- Coach: Frank Hartmann
Medal record
Men's Greco-Roman wrestling
Representing Germany
World Championships
| Silver medal – second place | 1990 Ostia | 68 kg |
| Bronze medal – third place | 1995 Prague | 68 kg |

Jannis Zamanduridis (born 18 March 1966, in Chemnitz, East Germany) is a retired amateur German Greco-Roman wrestler, who competed in the men's welterweight category. Considered as one of Germany's most promising wrestlers in his decade, Zamanduridis has claimed two medals (one silver and one bronze) in the 68-kg division at the World Championships (1990 and 1995), but took an early hiatus shortly to focus on his coaching staff for the German wrestling team. In 2003, Zamanduridis suddenly came out of his impending retirement to compete for Germany at the 2004 Summer Olympics. Throughout his sporting career, Zamanduridis trained full time as a member of the wrestling club for KSV Köllerbach, under his personal coach Frank Hartmann.

== Background ==
Born in Chemnitz to his Greek-born parents, Zamanduridis and the rest of his family escaped from the East Germany regime shortly before the fall of the Berlin Wall. He moved to Püttlingen in Saarbrücken, and started his career as a member of the wrestling team for KSV Köllerbach. His first major sporting debut came at the 1990 World Wrestling Championships in Ostia, Italy, where Zamanduridis earned a silver medal in the 68-kg division, losing out to the former Soviet Union's Islam Dugushiev.

Since then, Zamanduridis held a stunning record of top three finishes from the German Grand Prix, and produced a bronze medal in the same category at the 1995 World Wrestling Championships in Prague. He also sought to qualify for the 1992 and 1996 Summer Olympics, but declined his bid. Just after his bronze medal triumph from the World Championships, Zamanduridis decided to take a short hiatus from the sport to focus his own career as a full-time national coach for the German wrestling team.

== Out of retirement ==
In December 2002, Zamanduridis announced that he would come out of retirement to compete again in wrestling. At the 2003 World Wrestling Championships in Créteil, France, he lost the quarterfinal match 1–3 in overtime to Ukraine's Armen Vardanyan. Despite leaving the tournament without a medal, Zamanduridis granted a ticket to his first Olympics and was officially selected to the German Olympic team, as he landed into the seventh spot of the world's final rankings.

At the 2004 Summer Olympics in Athens, Zamanduridis qualified for the German squad, as a 38-year-old veteran, in the men's 66 kg class. He lost his opening match 2–3 to Kazakhstan's Mkhitar Manukyan, but pulled himself into a powerful 5–2 lead to thrash U.S. wrestler Oscar Wood in his second bout. When Zamanduridis faced off against Greece's Konstantinos Arkoudeas in front of a massive home crowd inside Ano Liossa Olympic Hall, he tried to throw the Greek in the opening minute, but could not hold him tighter inside the mat in overtime, and lost the match with another 2–3 sudden death decision. Zamanduridis finished third in the preliminary competition and ninth overall; he did not advance to the quarterfinals. Two wrestlers were disqualified by a forfeit in a special consolation round so Zamanduridis' overall rank was upgraded to seventh.

== Coaching career ==
Zamanduridis began his career for the German wrestling team as an assistant coach in 1996, but took a year off from the job, when he made his official comeback to compete again in wrestling. Shortly after his first Olympic Games, Zamanduridis returned to the scene as part of the coaching staff for the wrestling team, and then became a national coach.

In January 2013, Zamanduridis was appointed as the national sports director for the German Wrestling Federation.
