= Manuchar Kvirkvelia =

Georgian Greco-Roman wrestler and politician

Member of the Parliament of Georgia
- Incumbent
- Assumed office 11 December 2020

President of the Georgian Wrestling Federation
- In office 26 December 2014 – 17 December 2016
- Preceded by: Luka Kurtanidze
- Succeeded by: Gega Gegeshidze

Personal details
- Born: October 12, 1978 (age 47) Ozurgeti (Georgian SSR)
- Party: United National Movement
- Profession: Wrestler

Manuchar Kvirkvelia (Georgian: მანუჩარ კვირკველია; born on October 12, 1978) is a retired Georgian Greco-Roman wrestler and politician, an Olympic champion and a member of the Parliament of Georgia since 2008.

Manuchar Kvirkvelia
Medal record

Men's Greco-Roman wrestling

Representing Georgia

Olympic Games
Gold medal – first place	2008 Beijing	74 kg

World Championships
Gold medal – first place	2003 Créteil	66 kg
Bronze medal – third place	2002 Moscow	66 kg
Bronze medal – third place	2006 Guangzhou	74 kg

European Championships
Gold medal – first place	2007 Sofia	74 kg
Silver medal – second place	2002 Seinaejoki	66 kg
Bronze medal – third place	2006 Moscow	74 kg

== Early life and family ==
Manuchar Kvirkvelia was born on October 12, 1978, in Ozurgeti, Guria, a town in then-Soviet Georgia. He graduated in 2007 from the Vita Training University of Tbilisi, receiving a degree in finance.

He is married to Inga Shanava and has six children, including three sons and three daughters.

== Sports career ==
=== Wrestling champion ===
Manuchar Kvirkvelia started wrestling first in his hometown of Ozurgeti and after being discovered, moved to Tbilisi, where he started practicing Greco-Roman wrestling. During his student years, he earned his living with wrestling and competed in the Turkish Wrestling Federation. He first appeared on the international mat at the age of 24 at the European Championship in the lightweight category in Seinäjoki, Finland, where he won the Silver Medal, finishing second to Turkey's Şeref Eroğlu. That same year, he finished third with the Bronze Medal at the World Wrestling Championship held in Moscow. In 2003, he participated in the European Championship held in Belgrade, where he took 5th place and lost once again to Şeref Eroğlu. However, he won the Gold Medal after winning the World Championship in Créteil, France, defeating his old rival Eroğlu and 1996 Polish Olympic champion Ryszard Wolny. He took part in the 2004 Summer Olympic Games in Athens, where he would be disqualified after starting a brawl with Şeref Eroğlu, to whom he lost with a crushing score of 1–11.

Manuchar Kvirkvelia moved to the 74 kg category of men's Greco-Roman wrestling in 2004. In that category, he won the Bronze Medal at the World Championship in Guangzhou in 2006 and at that same year's European Championship in Moscow. He won the European Championship held in Sofia in 2007, winning his second international title, although he would perform poorly at the World Championship in Baku later that year, finishing 20th.

Kvirkvelia qualified for the 2008 Summer Olympics in Beijing, where he defeated China's Chang Yongxiang to become an Olympic champion and winning the Gold Medal in the 74 km competition, becoming the first Georgian gold medal at that year's Olympic competitions. The games coincided with the Russo-Georgian War and Kvirkvelia said after his victory:

With our victory, we did not just bring honor to our country but also demonstrated that even becoming Olympic champion does not make us happy if we have no peace in our homeland. We did not need to talk much, everyone saw it. As for the option of withdrawing from the Games, I am the one who wants to get back home as soon as possible, since my wife is awaiting our second child right now.

Manuchar Kvirkvelia has been awarded the Medal of Honor by President Eduard Shevardnadze (2003), the Order of Excellence by President Mikheil Saakashvili (2008), and the Order of Honor by President Giorgi Margvelashvili (2018). He is also a Knight of Sports since 2003.

=== President of GWF ===
Manuchar Kvirkvelia was elected as President of the Georgian Wrestling Federation on December 26, 2014, defeating Valery Gelashvili, a member of Parliament endorsed by the governing Georgian Dream party, with 59 to 43 votes. His two-year term ended on December 17, 2016 when he was defeated for reelection by Gega Gegeshidze, a former wrestler and controversial figure who had received the support of Georgian Dream, only receiving 24 votes to Gegeshidze's 46.

He remained active in the sports management world after 2016. During the 2020 Georgian Olympic Committee President election, he was one of several former athletes to boycott the election, alleging that the Olympic Committee's bylaws had been rewritten to benefit incumbent Leri Khabelov's reelection.

A businessman, his wealth has estimated him to be a millionaire.

== Political career ==
Manuchar Kvirkvelia joined the Progress and Freedom party (P&F), a right-wing party created by businessmen Kakhaber Okriashvili and Tsezar Chocheli ahead of the 2020 parliamentary election. When the party merged with the Strength Is in Unity electoral bloc led by the United National Movement, he was nominated by the coalition as candidate for the Guria Majoritarian District. He ran against 13 candidates, including incumbent MP Khatuna Gogorishvili (European Georgia) and GD's Vasil Chigogidze. Kvirkvelia was defeated in the first round, ending second with 22.9%. He won a seat in the Parliament of Georgia nonetheless through the bloc's electoral list, but was one of 49 MPs to refuse to recognize the results and boycotted their seats after allegations of massive voter fraud surfaced.

Kvirkvelia joined Parliament in May 2021 after a short-lived EU-facilitated agreement between Georgian Dream and the opposition. Since then, he has served as Deputy Chairman of the Sports and Youth Committee. One of the least active MPs, he's only participated in less than 1% of votes on the floor. He is one of the largest donors of the Strength is in Unity bloc.
