= Artak Harutyunyan =

Armenian Greco-Roman wrestler

Personal information
- Born: 31 March 1983 (age 43) Armenia
- Height: 1.68 m (5 ft 6 in)
- Weight: 65 kg (143 lb)

Sport
- Sport: Wrestling
- Event: Greco-Roman
- Club: Ashratank Yerevan
- Coached by: Kirakoc Kamo

Artak Harutyunyan (Armenian: Արտակ Հարությունյան, born 31 March 1983) is an Armenian Greco Roman wrestler. He competed three times at the world championships—finishing 31st in 2005, 11th in 2006, and 13th in 2009.

Harutyunyan was a member of the Armenian Greco-Roman wrestling team at the 2010 Wrestling World Cup. The Armenian team came in third place.
