= Li Yanyan =

Chinese Greco-Roman wrestler

Li Yanyan (born 18 June 1981 in Linyi, Shandong) is a Chinese former Greco-Roman wrestler. He was the men's Greco-Roman 66 kg World Champion at the 2006 World Championships. He also competed at the 2008 Beijing Olympics.
