= Yavor Yanakiev =

Bulgarian wrestler (born 1985)

Medal record

Men's Greco-Roman wrestling

Representing Bulgaria

Olympic Games
Bronze medal – third place	2008 Beijing	74 kg

World Championships
Gold medal – first place	2007 Baku	74 kg

European Championships
Bronze medal – third place	2013 Tbilisi	74 kg

Yavor Dimitrov Yanakiev (Bulgarian: Явор Димитров Янакиев; born 3 June 1985 in Stara Zagora) is a Bulgarian wrestler who won the bronze medal in the Men's Greco-Roman 74kg at the 2008 Summer Olympics in Beijing.

Yanakiev currently competes for Slavia Litex, where his coach is Stoyan Dobrev; his first coach was Petar
