= Konstantinos Arkoudeas =

Greek Greco-Roman wrestler

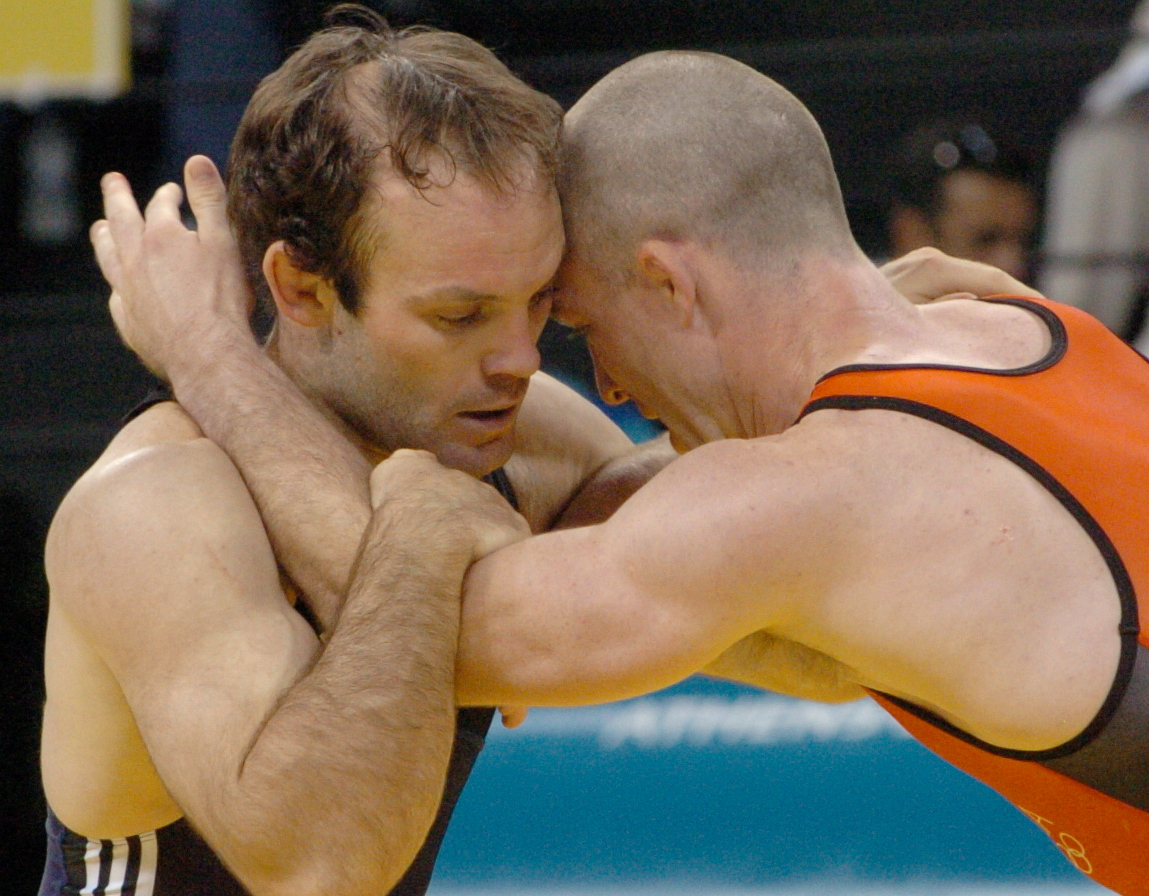
- Arkoudeas (left) at the 2004 Olympics

Personal information
- Full name: Konstantinos Arkoudeas
- Born: 31 March 1973 (age 53) Athens, Greece
- Height: 1.62 m (5 ft 4 in)

Sport
- Style: Greco-Roman
- Club: SC Ethnikos
- Coach: Panagiotis Arkoudeas
Medal record
Representing Greece
Mediterranean Games
Silver medal – second place	1993 Languedoc	62 kg

Konstantinos "Kostas" Arkoudeas (Greek: Κωνσταντίνος Αρκουδέας; born 31 March 1973) is a retired welterweight Greco-Roman wrestler from Greece. He won a silver medal in the 62 kg division at the 1993 Mediterranean Games and placed ninth and sixth at the 1992 and 2004 Olympics, respectively. Until his retirement in 2005, Arkoudeas trained at Ethnikos Piraeus F.C. under his father Panagiotis Arkoudeas.

Arkoudeas made his international debut at the 1992 Summer Olympics in Barcelona, where he placed ninth in the 62 kg division. Twelve years later, he qualified for his second Olympics, as a 31-year-old veteran, in the 66 kg class when Greece hosted the 2004 Summer Olympics in Athens. He filled up an entry by the International Federation of Association Wrestling and the Hellenic Olympic Committee, as Greece received an automatic berth for being the host nation. He started with a 9–3 victory over Oscar Wood, before losing his next match 1–4 to Mkhitar Manukyan. In his final match against Jannis Zamanduridis, Arkoudeas pulled from a 2–2 tie to win in overtime, but fell short to advance to the quarterfinals, finishing second in the preliminary pool.
