= Moisés Sánchez =

Spanish wrestler (born 1980)

Personal information
- Full name: Moisés Sánchez Parra
- Nationality: Spain
- Born: 21 September 1980 (age 45) Palma de Mallorca, Spain
- Height: 1.71 m (5 ft 7 1/2 in)
- Weight: 66 kg (146 lb)

Sport
- Style: Greco-Roman
- Club: Budokan Wrestling Club
- Coach: Eusebio Capel
Medal record
Men's Greco-Roman wrestling
Representing Spain
Mediterranean Games
Silver medal – second place	2005 Almería	66 kg
European Championships
Bronze medal – third place	2005 Varna	66 kg

Moisés Sánchez Parra (Note: In this Spanish name, the first or paternal surname is Sánchez and the second or maternal family name is Parra.) (born September 21, 1980 in Palma de Mallorca) is a retired amateur Spanish Greco-Roman wrestler, who competed in the men's welterweight category. He represented his nation Spain at the 2004 Summer Olympics and later capped his sporting career in 2005 with a silver and bronze at the Mediterranean Games and European Championships. Before his retirement from wrestling in 2010, Sanchez trained full-time for Budokan Wrestling Club in Palma de Mallorca under his coach Eusebio Capel.

Sanchez qualified for the Spanish squad in the men's 66 kg class at the 2004 Summer Olympics in Athens. Earlier in the process, he finished second at the Olympic Qualification Tournament in Tashkent, Uzbekistan to guarantee his spot on the returning Spanish wrestling team after a 12-year hiatus. He lost two straight matches each to Kyrgyzstan's Kanatbek Begaliev (1–9) and Iran's Parviz Zeidvand (1–3) that left him on the bottom of the prelim pool, placing eighteenth in the final standings. As two wrestlers were both disqualified by a forfeit in the fifth-place match, Sanchez's position was upgraded to sixteenth.

In 2005, Sanchez overcame his Olympic setback to pick up a bronze medal in the 66-kg division at the European Championships in Varna, Bulgaria. When Spain hosted the Mediterranean Games in Almería a few months later, Sanchez lost his final match to Turkey's Selçuk Çebi, and received a silver medal to the delight of the home crowd. He also sought his second bid for the 2008 Summer Olympics in Beijing, but failed to earn a spot from two Olympic Qualification Tournaments.
