= Julian Kwit =

Polish Greco-Roman wrestler

Julian Kwit (born 1 December 1983 in Wałbrzych) is a Polish Greco-Roman wrestler who competed in the 2008 Summer Olympics in Beijing.

At the 2008 Summer Olympics he finished 13th in the middleweight competition (74 kg) in wrestling.
