= Nikolay Gergov =

Bulgarian Greco-Roman wrestler

Personal information
- Full name: Nikolay Borislavov Gergov
- Nationality: Bulgaria
- Born: 17 March 1978 (age 48) Oryahovo, Vratsa, Bulgaria
- Height: 1.74 m (5 ft 8 1/2 in)
- Weight: 66 kg (146 lb)

Sport
- Style: Greco-Roman
- Club: Slavia Litex
- Coach: Bratan Tzenov
Medal record
Men's Greco-Roman wrestling
Representing Bulgaria
World Championships
| Gold medal – first place | 2005 Budapest | 66 kg |
| Bronze medal – third place | 2007 Baku | 66 kg |
European Championships
| Gold medal – first place | 2005 Varna | 66 kg |
| Gold medal – first place | 2007 Sofia | 66 kg |

Nikolay Borislavov Gergov (Bulgarian: Николай Бориславов Гергов; born March 17, 1978, in Oryahovo, Vratsa) is a Bulgarian Greco-Roman wrestler, who played for the men's welterweight category. He defeated South Korea's Kim Min-Chul for a gold medal in the 66 kg division at the 2005 World Wrestling Championships in Budapest, Hungary, in addition to his bronze from the 2007 World Wrestling Championships in Baku, Azerbaijan. He is also a two-time Olympian, a double European wrestling champion, and a member of Slavia Litex Wrestling Club in Sofia, under his personal coach Bratan Tzenov. Because of his further successes in wrestling, Gergov was selected as one of eleven athletes for the Bulgarian Sports Personality Award in 2007.

Gergov made his official debut for the 2004 Summer Olympics in Athens, where he placed second in the preliminary pool of the men's 66 kg class, against South Korea's Kim In-Sub and Hungary's Levente Füredy.

At the 2008 Summer Olympics in Beijing, Gergov competed for the second time in the men's 66 kg class. He defeated Turkey's Şeref Eroğlu, and Russia's Sergey Kovalenko in the preliminary rounds, before losing out the semi-final match to Kyrgyzstan's Kanatbek Begaliev, with a classification point score of 1–3. Because his opponent advanced further into the final match, Gergov automatically qualified for the bronze medal bout, where he was defeated by Ukraine's Armen Vardanyan, with a three-set technical score (4–1, 1–2, 6–1), and a classification point score of 1–3.
