= Valdemaras Venckaitis =

Lithuanian Greco-Roman wrestler (born 1983)

Personal information
- Nationality: Lithuania
- Born: 4 September 1983 (age 43) Vilnius, Lithuanian SSR, Soviet Union
- Height: 1.70 m (5 ft 7 in)
- Weight: 74 kg (163 lb)

Sport
- Sport: Wrestling
- Event: Greco-Roman
- Club: LOSC Vilnius (LTU)
- Coached by: Ruslan Vartanov
Medal record
Men's freestyle wrestling
Representing Lithuania
World Wrestling Championships
Bronze medal – third place	2007 Baku	74 kg

Valdemaras Venckaitis (born 4 September 1983 in Vilnius) is a Greco-Roman wrestler from Lithuania, who competed for the men's 74 kg (middleweight division) at the 2008 Summer Olympics in Beijing. He was eliminated in the first round of the competition, after being defeated by Peru's Sixto Barrera, and finished in fourteenth place.

Venckaitis also won the bronze medal for his category at the 2007 World Wrestling Championships in Baku, Azerbaijan. He is the brother of Edgaras Venckaitis, who later competed for the lightweight division at the 2012 Summer Olympics in London.
