= Armen Vardanyan =

Armenian-Ukrainian Greco-Roman wrestler (born 1982)

Personal information
- Nationality: Ukrainian
- Born: 30 November 1982 (age 43) Leninakan, Armenian SSR, Soviet Union
- Height: 1.72 m (5 ft 7 1/2 in)
- Weight: 66 kg (146 lb)

Sport
- Sport: Wrestling
- Event: Greco-Roman
- Club: Dynamo Zaporizhzhia
Medal record
Men's Greco-Roman wrestling
Representing Ukraine
Olympic Games
Bronze medal – third place	2008 Beijing	66 kg
World Championships
Silver medal – second place	2003 Creteil	66 kg
Silver medal – second place	2010 Moscow	66 kg
Silver medal – second place	2015 Las Vegas	71 kg
European Championships
Silver medal – second place	2003 Belgrade	66 kg
Gold medal – first place	2004 Haparand	66 kg
Gold medal – first place	2008 Tampere	66 kg
World Cup
Bronze medal – third place	2007 Antalya	66 kg

Armen Frunzekovych Vardanyan (Armenian: Արմեն Վարդանյան, Ukrainian: Армен Фрунзікович Варданян, born 30 November 1982) is an Armenian-Ukrainian Greco-Roman wrestler. He is an Olympic bronze medalist, three-time World Championships silver medalist, and two-time European Champion. He has also been awarded the Honoured Master of Sports Ukraine title.

== Early life ==
Vardanyan was born into a family of teachers. His mother taught Russian language and literature and his father was the director of a railway technical school. Vardanyan began wrestling in his hometown of Leninakan, Soviet Armenia (now Gyumri, Armenia). After the 1988 Armenian earthquake, he moved to Zaporizhzhia, Ukraine. He graduated from Zaporozhye National Technical University and was a soldier of the State Border Service of Ukraine. As of 1999 he lived in Kyiv.

== Career ==
Vardanyan became a Junior World Champion in 2000 in the Greco-Roman 66 kg class and began competing as a senior in the same division in 2003. He won silver medals at the 2003 European Wrestling Championships and 2003 World Wrestling Championships. The next year he became a European Champion by winning a gold medal at the 2004 European Wrestling Championships. He qualified for the 2004 Summer Olympics, but was unable to win a medal.

In 2008 Vardanyan won a gold medal at the 2008 European Wrestling Championships. Vardanyan returned to the Olympics in 2008 in Beijing and upset the reigning Olympic Champion and Azeri flag bearer Farid Mansurov in his first match. He then lost to eventual silver medalist Kanatbek Begaliev in the quarterfinals, but rebounded with wins over Jake Deitchler and Nikolay Gergov in the repechage rounds to win a bronze medal. He won a second silver medal at the 2010 World Wrestling Championships and later tried to qualify for the 2012 Summer Olympics, but came in fourth place in the trials where only the top three wrestlers qualified.

In October 2010 Vardanyan organized and hosted a Greco-Roman wrestling tournament in the youth age group. The tournament was attended by 90 children from Zaporizhzhia, who were divided into three age groups. In 2012 the tournament was held for a third time and involved 136 participants from Zaporizhzhia and Dnipropetrovsk. That year, at the annual conference of the Association of Social Organizations, Vardanyan was named a coach of the Greco-Roman wrestling national team of the Union of Armenians of Ukraine.

== Politics ==
In the 2012 Ukrainian parliamentary election Vardanyan ran for the Verkhovna Rada as a member of the party All-Ukrainian Union "Fatherland" for the District No. 76. His revenue for the campaign was 120 thousand hryvnia. In addition to common purposes of the united opposition, Vardanyan pledged to create a network of sports facilities and clubs to satisfy the needs of the population. He failed to be elected, taking fourth place.
