= Chang Yongxiang =

Chinese Greco-Roman wrestler

Personal information
- Born: September 16, 1983 (age 42) Handan, Hebei, China
- Height: 178 cm (5 ft 10 in)
- Weight: 74 kg (163 lb)

Sport
- Sport: Greco-Roman wrestling
Medal record
Men's Greco-Roman wrestling
Representing China
Olympic Games
Silver medal – second place	2008 Beijing	74 kg
Asian Championships
Gold medal – first place	2008 Jeju City	74 kg
Bronze medal – third place	2007 Bishkek	74 kg

Chang Yongxiang (Chinese: 常永祥; pinyin: Cháng Yǒngxiáng; born September 16, 1983) is a Chinese Greco-Roman wrestler who competed at the 2008 Summer Olympics, where he won the silver medal.

His personal best was coming 1st at the 2008 Asian Championships.
