= Levente Füredy =

Hungarian Greco-Roman wrestler

Personal information
- Full name: Levente Füredy
- Nationality: Hungary
- Born: 12 January 1978 (age 48) Budapest, Hungary
- Height: 1.75 m (5 ft 9 in)
- Weight: 73 kg (161 lb)

Sport
- Style: Greco-Roman
- Club: Vasutas SC
- Coach: Ferenc Kiss
Medal record
Men's Greco-Roman wrestling
Representing Hungary
World Championships
Bronze medal – third place	2003 Créteil	66 kg

Levente Füredy (born January 12, 1978, in Budapest) is a retired amateur Hungarian Greco-Roman wrestler, who competed in the men's welterweight category. He became a bronze medalist in the 66-kg division at the 2003 World Wrestling Championships, which earned him a ticket to represent Hungary at the 2004 Summer Olympics. Throughout his sporting career, Furedy trained under his personal coach and mentor Ferenc Kiss for Budapesti Vasutas Sport Club in Budapest.

Furedy emerged into the international scene at the 2003 World Wrestling Championships in Créteil, France, where he picked up the bronze medal in the men's welterweight category, receiving him a ticket to be selected for the Hungarian Olympic team.

At the 2004 Summer Olympics in Athens, Furedy qualified for the Hungarian squad in the men's 60 kg class by placing third and receiving a berth from the World Championships. He lost two straight matches each to Bulgaria's Nikolay Gergov (2–3) and South Korea's Kim In-Sub (1–6), who previously claimed a silver medal from Sydney four years earlier in the same weight category, finishing third in the preliminary pool, and fifteenth in the overall standings.
