= Farid Mansurov =

Azerbaijani Greco-Roman wrestler

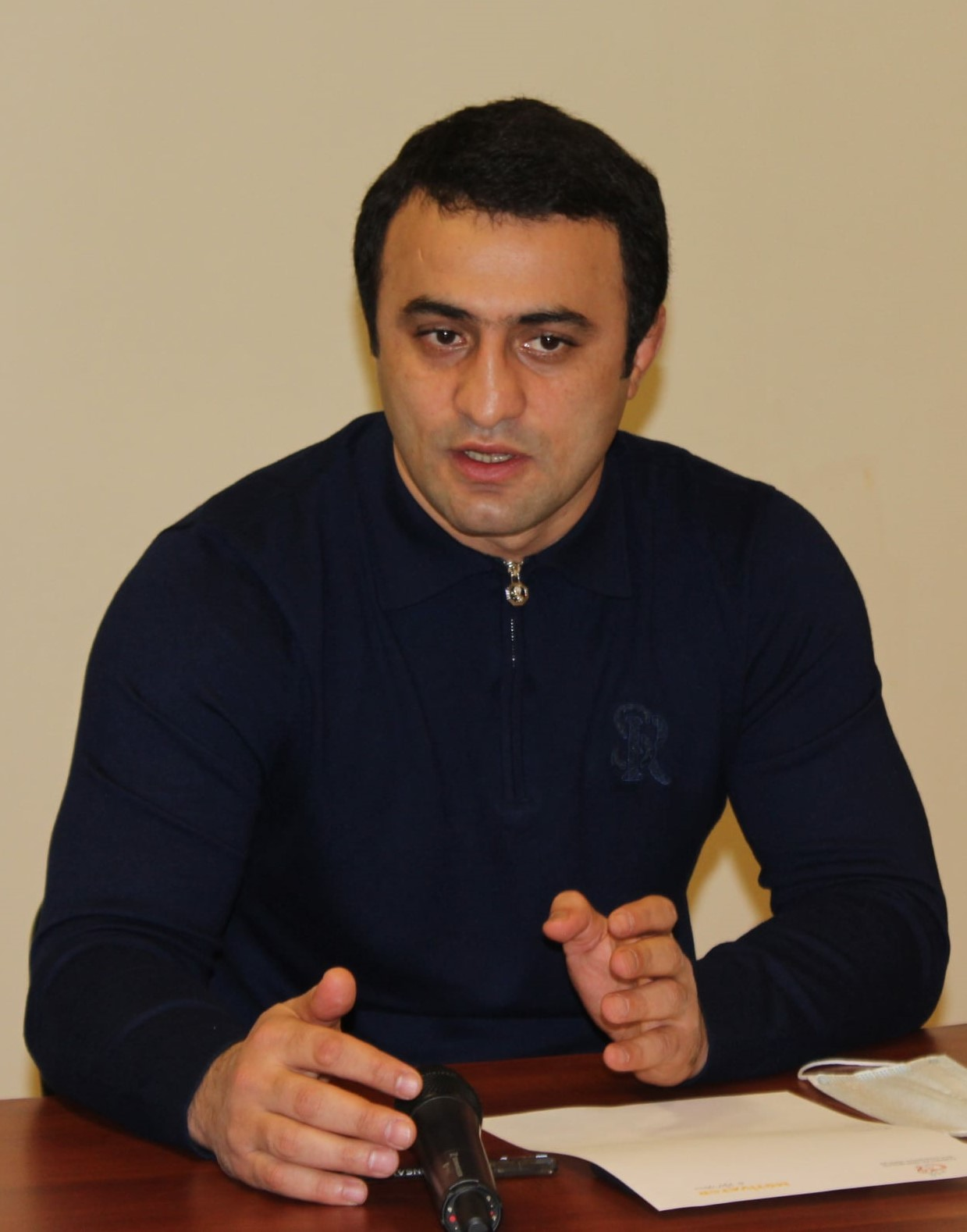

Medal record

Men's Greco-Roman wrestling

Representing Azerbaijan

Olympic Games
Gold medal – first place	2004 Athens	66 kg

World Championships
Silver medal – second place	2002 Moscow	66 kg
Gold medal – first place	2007 Baku	66 kg
Gold medal – first place	2009 Herning	66 kg

World Junior Championships
Gold medal – first place	2001 Tashkent	63 kg

World U17 Championships
Silver medal – second place	1997 Maribor	48 kg

Farid Mansurov (Azerbaijani: Fərid Mansurov) (born May 10, 1982, in Dmanisi, Georgia) is an Azerbaijani wrestler, gold medalist of the 2004 Summer Olympic Games in Greco-Roman wrestling at 66 kg. He retired in 2010, after conceding a jaw injury during the 2010 European Wrestling Championship. In 2010–2011, he coached the Azerbaijani national wrestling team. He is the head of the sport department in Azerbaijan's Ministry of Youth and Sport since 2016. He is also Vice President of Youth Wrestling Federation of Azerbaijan.

== Career ==
In 1992, he started to train under the leadership of Alikulu Hasanoglu (Azerbaijani: Əliqulu Həsənoğlu) in Neftchi Sport Society. He achieved his first success in 1997 when he took second place in the World Championship among juniors. In 1998, Mansurov heavily injured his wrist during the semi-final match with a Cuban athlete.

Mansurov won the first place in the men's championship of Azerbaijan in 2000. A year later, He won gold medal in the World Championship held in Uzbekistan. In 2003, he won several Grand Prix tournaments and won the license to participate in the Athens Olympics 2004. At the 2004 Summer Olympics, he won the Olympic Champion title in Greco-Roman wrestling in the 66 kg weight division. He was unable to train due to his back injury for three years after 2004. In 2007, he returned to the sport and won a gold medal at the World Championship which took place in Baku and got the license for 2008 Summer Olympics. He fell ill during the 2008 Beijing Olympics and was subsequently defeated. In 2009, he became the World Champion for the second time at the 2009 Herning championships in Denmark.

On June 30, 2010, Farid Mansurov announced his retirement from the sport due to his injury in the last World Championship. On the same day, he was appointed as the head coach of the Greco-Roman wrestling team of Azerbaijan.

Olympic Games
Preceded by Nizami Pashayev	Flagbearer for Azerbaijan; Beijing 2008	Succeeded by Elnur Mammadli
