= Vaghinak Galstyan =

Armenian Greco-Roman wrestler

Personal information
- Born: 7 November 1973 (age 52) Yerevan, Armenian SSR, Soviet Union
- Height: 1.70 m (5 ft 7 in)
- Weight: 66 kg (146 lb)

Sport
- Sport: Wrestling
- Event: Greco-Roman
- Club: Trade Union SC Yerevan
- Coached by: Samvel Gevorgyan
Medal record
Men's Greco-Roman wrestling
Representing Armenia
World Championships
| Gold medal – first place | 2001 Patras | 63 kg |

Vaghinak Galstyan (Armenian: Վաղինակ Գալստյան, born 7 November 1973) is a retired Armenian Greco-Roman wrestler. He is a World Champion, winning gold in 2001. Galstyan was awarded the Honored Master of Sports of Armenia title in 2009.

Galstyan is only the second Wrestling World Champion in Greco-Roman wrestling from the independent Republic of Armenia, after Aghasi Manukyan. He was voted the Armenian Athlete of the Year for 2001. Galstyan also competed at the 2004 Summer Olympics and 2008 Summer Olympics.

He became the head of Armenia's sports organizations, sports and youth policy department of the Ministry of Sport and Youth Affairs in 2014. On 24 September 2015, he was awarded the Presidential Medal of Gratitude for his contributions.
