= Jimmy Samuelsson =

Swedish Greco-Roman wrestler

Jimmy Fredrik Samuelsson (born 7 November 1976) is a retired Swedish sport wrestler.

He was born in Norrtälje, and represented the sports club Spårvägens IK. At the World Championships he finished fourth in 2001 (69 kg), won the gold medal in 2002 (69 kg), finished eighth in 2005 (69 kg), fifteenth in 2006 (69 kg) and tenth in 2007 (69 kg). He finished fourth at the 2004 Olympic Games.

At the European Championships he finished fourth in 2001 (69 kg), fourteenth in 2004 (66 kg), fifth in 2005 (66 kg) and nineteenth in 2007 (74 kg).
