= Kanatbek Begaliev =

Kyrgyz wrestler (born 1984)

Medal record

Men's Greco-Roman wrestling

Representing Kyrgyzstan

Olympic Games
Silver medal – second place	2008 Beijing	66 kg

World Championships
Silver medal – second place	2006 Guangzhou	66 kg

Asian Championships
Bronze medal – third place	2003 New Delhi	66 kg
Gold medal – first place	2007 Bishkek	66 kg
Silver medal – second place	2008 Jeju City	66 kg

1st World Qualification Tournament
Bronze medal – third place	2012 Taiyuan (CHN)	66 kg

2nd World Qualification Tournament
Bronze medal – third place	2012 Helsinki (FIN)	66 kg

Kanatbek Kubatovich Begaliev (born 14 February 1984 in Talas, Kyrgyz SSR) is a Kyrgyz wrestler who won the silver medal in the Men's Greco-Roman 66 kg at the 2008 Summer Olympics in Beijing. After Athens 2004, where he placed 11th, he received an invitation to the Kazakh national team, which he accepted and also became Kazakhstan citizen. He trained in Kazakhstan with the Kazakh national team until it turned out that he was not yet eligible for Olympic qualification to represent Kazakhstan. Kanat then returned to Kyrgyzstan and qualified for Beijing 2008, where he won a silver medal. Consequently, he said: “Sure, I am always thankful to Kazakhstan, all Kazakh coaches and athletes who believed in me and shared with me their knowledge and skills. I trained there and played with them football. Thus part of this medal belongs to Kazakhstan”.
