= 1997 World Wrestling Championships – Men's Greco-Roman 69 kg =

Men's Greco-Roman 69 kg at the 1997 World Championships
- Venue: Hala Ludowa
- Dates: 11–13 September 1997
- Competitors: 33 from 33 nations

Medalists
gold medal	Son Sang-pil	South Korea
silver medal	Aleksandr Tretyakov	Russia
bronze medal	Ender Memet	Romania

The men's Greco-Roman 69 kilograms is a competition featured at the 1997 World Wrestling Championships, and was held in Wrocław, Poland from 11 to 13 September 1997.

== Results ==
Legend

- WO — Won by walkover

=== Round 1 ===
	Score	
Round of 64
Saiyinjiya (CHN)	0–4	Vladimir Kopytov (BLR)
Valeri Nikitin (EST)	0–3	Aleksandr Tretyakov (RUS)
Giorgi Jinjvelashvili (GEO)	3–0	Đorđe Stojičić (YUG)
Ryszard Wolny (POL)	5–0	Grigori Pulyaev (UZB)
Rustam Adzhi (UKR)	3–1	Liubal Colás (CUB)
Alex Raptis (JAM)	0–11	Christian Eyer (FRA)
José Escobar (COL)	5–7	Jong Kon-i (PRK)
Ari Härkänen (FIN)	7–0	José Alberto Díaz (VEN)
Vugar Aslanov (AZE)	2–1	Mecnun Güler (TUR)
Petr Bielesz (CZE)	3–2	Chris Saba (USA)
Felipe Moreno (ESP)	0–10	Son Sang-pil (KOR)
Adam Juretzko (GER)	9–0	Sándor Bajczik (HUN)
Ender Memet (ROM)	3–2	Andrey Nikiforov (KAZ)
Vaghinak Galstyan (ARM)	9–0 Fall	Katsuhiko Nagata (JPN)
Georgios Boukis (GRE)	7–2	Mark Roelofs (NED)
Mattias Schoberg (SWE)	1–3	Walter Metzler (AUT)
Biser Georgiev (BUL)		Bye

=== Round 2 ===
	Score	
Round of 32
Biser Georgiev (BUL)	7–0	Vladimir Kopytov (BLR)
Aleksandr Tretyakov (RUS)	3–0	Giorgi Jinjvelashvili (GEO)
Ryszard Wolny (POL)	0–3	Rustam Adzhi (UKR)
Christian Eyer (FRA)	5–1	Jong Kon-i (PRK)
Ari Härkänen (FIN)	2–3	Vugar Aslanov (AZE)
Petr Bielesz (CZE)	3–14	Son Sang-pil (KOR)
Adam Juretzko (GER)	1–0	Ender Memet (ROM)
Vaghinak Galstyan (ARM)	12–0	Georgios Boukis (GRE)
Walter Metzler (AUT)		Bye
Repechage
Saiyinjiya (CHN)	0–4	Valeri Nikitin (EST)
Đorđe Stojičić (YUG)	0–4	Grigori Pulyaev (UZB)
Liubal Colás (CUB)	WO	Alex Raptis (JAM)
José Escobar (COL)	6–0	José Alberto Díaz (VEN)
Mecnun Güler (TUR)	3–0 Fall	Chris Saba (USA)
Felipe Moreno (ESP)	3–7	Sándor Bajczik (HUN)
Andrey Nikiforov (KAZ)	0–1	Katsuhiko Nagata (JPN)
Mark Roelofs (NED)	0–4	Mattias Schoberg (SWE)

=== Round 3 ===
	Score	
Round of 16
Walter Metzler (AUT)	0–3	Biser Georgiev (BUL)
Aleksandr Tretyakov (RUS)	2–0	Rustam Adzhi (UKR)
Christian Eyer (FRA)	5–3	Vugar Aslanov (AZE)
Son Sang-pil (KOR)	5–1	Adam Juretzko (GER)
Vaghinak Galstyan (ARM)		Bye
Repechage
Valeri Nikitin (EST)	10–0	Grigori Pulyaev (UZB)
Liubal Colás (CUB)	10–0	José Escobar (COL)
Mecnun Güler (TUR)	4–0	Sándor Bajczik (HUN)
Katsuhiko Nagata (JPN)	2–1	Mattias Schoberg (SWE)
Vladimir Kopytov (BLR)	2–4	Giorgi Jinjvelashvili (GEO)
Ryszard Wolny (POL)	7–0	Jong Kon-i (PRK)
Ari Härkänen (FIN)	5–4	Petr Bielesz (CZE)
Ender Memet (ROM)	8–0	Georgios Boukis (GRE)

=== Round 4 ===
	Score	
Quarterfinals
Vaghinak Galstyan (ARM)	1–3	Biser Georgiev (BUL)
Aleksandr Tretyakov (RUS)		Bye
Christian Eyer (FRA)		Bye
Son Sang-pil (KOR)		Bye
Repechage
Valeri Nikitin (EST)	3–2	Liubal Colás (CUB)
Mecnun Güler (TUR)	6–0 Fall	Katsuhiko Nagata (JPN)
Giorgi Jinjvelashvili (GEO)	1–4	Ryszard Wolny (POL)
Ari Härkänen (FIN)	0–8	Ender Memet (ROM)
Walter Metzler (AUT)	0–12	Rustam Adzhi (UKR)
Vugar Aslanov (AZE)	1–2	Adam Juretzko (GER)

=== Round 5 ===
	Score	
Semifinals
Biser Georgiev (BUL)	1–3	Aleksandr Tretyakov (RUS)
Christian Eyer (FRA)	1–4	Son Sang-pil (KOR)
Repechage
Valeri Nikitin (EST)	4–1	Mecnun Güler (TUR)
Ryszard Wolny (POL)	1–2	Ender Memet (ROM)
Rustam Adzhi (UKR)	4–0	Vaghinak Galstyan (ARM)
Adam Juretzko (GER)		Bye

=== Round 6 ===
	Score	
Repechage
Adam Juretzko (GER)	3–0	Valeri Nikitin (EST)
Ender Memet (ROM)	3–0	Rustam Adzhi (UKR)

=== Round 7 ===
	Score	
Repechage
Biser Georgiev (BUL)	5–1	Adam Juretzko (GER)
Ender Memet (ROM)	3–1	Christian Eyer (FRA)

=== Finals ===
	Score	
5th place match
Adam Juretzko (GER)	4–0	Christian Eyer (FRA)
Bronze medal match
Biser Georgiev (BUL)	0–8	Ender Memet (ROM)
Final
Aleksandr Tretyakov (RUS)	1–6	Son Sang-pil (KOR)
