= 1999 World Wrestling Championships – Men's Greco-Roman 69 kg =

Men's Greco-Roman 69 kg at the 1999 World Championships
- Venue: Peace and Friendship Stadium
- Dates: 24–26 September 1999
- Competitors: 36 from 36 nations

Medalists
gold medal	Son Sang-pil	South Korea
silver medal	Aleksandr Tretyakov	Russia
bronze medal	Vladimir Kopytov	Belarus

The men's Greco-Roman 69 kilograms is a competition featured at the 1999 World Wrestling Championships, and was held at the Peace and Friendship Stadium in Piraeus, Athens, Greece from 24 to 26 September 1999.

== Results ==
Legend

- D — Disqualified
- F — Won by fall

=== Preliminary round ===
==== Pool 1 ====
Pos	Athlete	Pld	W	L	CP	TP	GEO	TUR	FIN
1	Giorgi Jinjvelashvili (GEO)	2	2	0	6	10	—	3–1	7–0
2	Mecnun Güler (TUR)	2	1	1	4	4	1–3 PP	—	3–1
3	Ari Härkänen (FIN)	2	0	2	1	1	0–3 PO	1–3 PP	—

Source: Official website

==== Pool 2 ====
Pos	Athlete	Pld	W	L	CP	TP	BLR	KOR	JPN
1	Vladimir Kopytov (BLR)	2	2	0	6	6	—	4–1	2–1
2	Son Sang-pil (KOR)	2	1	1	5	5	1–3 PP	—	4–0 Fall
3	Katsuhiko Nagata (JPN)	2	0	2	1	1	1–3 PP	0–4 TO	—

Source: Official website

==== Pool 3 ====
Pos	Athlete	Pld	W	L	CP	TP	CUB	SUI	DEN
1	Liubal Colás (CUB)	2	2	0	7	19	—	10–0	9–0
2	Daniel Schnyder (SUI)	2	1	1	3	3	0–4 ST	—	3–1
3	Jan Schou (DEN)	2	0	2	1	1	0–3 PO	1–3 PP	—

Source: Official website

==== Pool 4 ====
Pos	Athlete	Pld	W	L	CP	TP	GER	BUL	AUT
1	Adam Juretzko (GER)	2	2	0	7	15	—	4–1	11–0
2	Biser Georgiev (BUL)	2	1	1	4	4	1–3 PP	—	3–0
3	Simon Häusle (AUT)	2	0	2	0	0	0–4 ST	0–3 PO	—

Source: Official website

==== Pool 5 ====
Pos	Athlete	Pld	W	L	CP	TP	FRA	YUG	RSA
1	Ghani Yalouz (FRA)	2	2	0	8	24	—	11–1	13–0
2	Đorđe Miolski (YUG)	2	1	1	5	11	1–4 SP	—	10–0
3	Juan Nel (RSA)	2	0	2	0	0	0–4 ST	0–4 ST	—

Source: Official website

==== Pool 6 ====
Pos	Athlete	Pld	W	L	CP	TP	ROM	UKR	KGZ
1	Ender Memet (ROM)	2	2	0	6	7	—	3–1	4–3
2	Rustam Adzhi (UKR)	2	1	1	5	9	1–3 PP	—	8–2 Fall
3	Auaz Ordobaev (KGZ)	2	0	2	1	5	1–3 PP	0–4 TO	—

Source: Official website

==== Pool 7 ====
Pos	Athlete	Pld	W	L	CP	TP	RUS	POL	SWE
1	Aleksandr Tretyakov (RUS)	2	2	0	6	4	—	1–0	3–0
2	Ryszard Wolny (POL)	2	1	1	3	4	0–3 PO	—	4–0
3	Mattias Schoberg (SWE)	2	0	2	0	0	0–3 PO	0–3 PO	—

Source: Official website

==== Pool 8 ====
Pos	Athlete	Pld	W	L	CP	TP	CZE	AZE	BIH
1	Petr Bielesz (CZE)	2	2	0	7	22	—	6–2	16–6
2	Vugar Aslanov (AZE)	2	1	1	5	12	1–3 PP	—	10–0
3	Dragan Marković (BIH)	2	0	2	1	6	1–4 SP	0–4 ST	—

Source: Official website

==== Pool 9 ====
Pos	Athlete	Pld	W	L	CP	TP	IRI	UZB	PRK
1	Parviz Zeidvand (IRI)	2	2	0	6	8	—	5–0	3–2
2	Grigori Pulyaev (UZB)	2	1	1	3	4	0–3 PO	—	4–2
3	Jong Kon-i (PRK)	2	0	2	2	4	1–3 PP	1–3 PP	—

Source: Official website

==== Pool 10 ====
Pos	Athlete	Pld	W	L	CP	TP	ARM	NOR	USA
1	Movses Karapetyan (ARM)	2	2	0	7	19	—	12–0	7–6
2	Thomas Amundsen (NOR)	2	1	1	3	5	0–4 ST	—	5–0
3	David Zuniga (USA)	2	0	2	1	6	1–3 PP	0–3 PO	—

Source: Official website

==== Pool 11 ====
Pos	Athlete	Pld	W	L	CP	TP	HUN	TPE	GUM
1	Csaba Hirbik (HUN)	2	2	0	8	18	—	7–0 Fall	11–0
2	Liu Cheng-hua (TPE)	2	1	1	4	11	0–4 TO	—	11–0
3	Melchor Manibusan (GUM)	2	0	2	0	0	0–4 ST	0–4 ST	—

Source: Official website

==== Pool 12 ====
Pos	Athlete	Pld	W	L	CP	TP	GRE	CHN	KAZ
1	Alexios Kolitsopoulos (GRE)	2	2	0	6	8	—	4–0	4–0
2	Zhang Xiling (CHN)	2	1	1	3	3	0–3 PO	—	3–2
3	Nurlan Koizhaiganov (KAZ)	2	0	2	1	2	0–3 PO	1–3 PP	—

Source: Official website

=== Knockout round ===
Round of 16
Giorgi Jinjvelashvili (GEO)	0^{D}
Vladimir Kopytov (BLR)	4
Liubal Colás (CUB)	5
Adam Juretzko (GER)	2
Ghani Yalouz (FRA)	5
Ender Memet (ROM)	1
Aleksandr Tretyakov (RUS)	3
Petr Bielesz (CZE)	1
Parviz Zeidvand (IRI)	5
Movses Karapetyan (ARM)	0
Csaba Hirbik (HUN)	1
Alexios Kolitsopoulos (GRE)	0
Son Sang-pil (KOR)	6^{F}
Đorđe Miolski (YUG)	0
Rustam Adzhi (UKR)	3
Vugar Aslanov (AZE)	2

Quarterfinals
Vladimir Kopytov (BLR)	5
Liubal Colás (CUB)	0
Ghani Yalouz (FRA)	3
Aleksandr Tretyakov (RUS)	4
Parviz Zeidvand (IRI)	0
Csaba Hirbik (HUN)	3
Son Sang-pil (KOR)	10
Rustam Adzhi (UKR)	0

Semifinals
Vladimir Kopytov (BLR)	0
Aleksandr Tretyakov (RUS)	4
Csaba Hirbik (HUN)	0
Son Sang-pil (KOR)	10

Final
Aleksandr Tretyakov (RUS)	0
Son Sang-pil (KOR)	4
Bronze medal match
Vladimir Kopytov (BLR)	4
Csaba Hirbik (HUN)	4
