= 1998 World Wrestling Championships – Men's Greco-Roman 69 kg =

Men's Greco-Roman 69 kg at the 1998 World Championships
- Venue: Gavlerinken
- Dates: 28–30 August 1998
- Competitors: 25 from 25 nations

Medalists
gold medal	Aleksandr Tretyakov	Russia
silver medal	Csaba Hirbik	Hungary
bronze medal	Son Sang-pil	South Korea

The men's Greco-Roman 69 kilograms is a competition featured at the 1998 World Wrestling Championships, and was held at the Gavlerinken in Gävle, Sweden from 28 to 30 August 1998.

== Results ==
Legend

- DQ — Won by disqualification

=== Round 1 ===
	Score	
Round of 32
Lian Chunzhi (CHN)	1–9 Fall	Ender Memet (ROM)
Mecnun Güler (TUR)	1–3	Valeri Nikitin (EST)
Aleksandr Tretyakov (RUS)	1–0	Rustam Adzhi (UKR)
Ari Härkänen (FIN)	3–0	Katsuhiko Nagata (JPN)
Adam Juretzko (GER)	0–2	Vitaly Zhuk (BLR)
Mark Roelofs (NED)	0–5	Biser Georgiev (BUL)
Luis Izquierdo (COL)	1–4	Thomas Amundsen (NOR)
Nurlan Koizhaiganov (KAZ)	0–10	Son Sang-pil (KOR)
Gianluca Caniglia (ITA)	0–8	Giorgi Jinjvelashvili (GEO)
Peter Puls (SWE)	0–10	Ryszard Wolny (POL)
Theodoros Voltsidis (GRE)	3–2	Chris Saba (USA)
Rade Bačič (SLO)	0–7	Christian Eyer (FRA)
Csaba Hirbik (HUN)		Bye

=== Round 2 ===
	Score	
Round of 16
Csaba Hirbik (HUN)	4–2	Ender Memet (ROM)
Valeri Nikitin (EST)	0–1	Aleksandr Tretyakov (RUS)
Ari Härkänen (FIN)	0–2	Vitaly Zhuk (BLR)
Biser Georgiev (BUL)	7–0	Thomas Amundsen (NOR)
Son Sang-pil (KOR)	2–3	Giorgi Jinjvelashvili (GEO)
Ryszard Wolny (POL)	7–0	Theodoros Voltsidis (GRE)
Christian Eyer (FRA)		Bye
Repechage
Lian Chunzhi (CHN)	0–3	Mecnun Güler (TUR)
Rustam Adzhi (UKR)	2–0	Katsuhiko Nagata (JPN)
Adam Juretzko (GER)	10–0	Mark Roelofs (NED)
Luis Izquierdo (COL)	0–6	Nurlan Koizhaiganov (KAZ)
Gianluca Caniglia (ITA)	1–4	Peter Puls (SWE)
Chris Saba (USA)	7–4	Rade Bačič (SLO)

=== Round 3 ===
	Score	
Quarterfinals
Christian Eyer (FRA)	2–2	Csaba Hirbik (HUN)
Aleksandr Tretyakov (RUS)	6–0	Vitaly Zhuk (BLR)
Biser Georgiev (BUL)	3–1	Giorgi Jinjvelashvili (GEO)
Ryszard Wolny (POL)		Bye
Repechage
Mecnun Güler (TUR)	5–1	Rustam Adzhi (UKR)
Adam Juretzko (GER)	5–0	Nurlan Koizhaiganov (KAZ)
Peter Puls (SWE)	2–0	Chris Saba (USA)
Ender Memet (ROM)	1–4	Valeri Nikitin (EST)
Ari Härkänen (FIN)	6–0	Thomas Amundsen (NOR)
Son Sang-pil (KOR)	5–0	Theodoros Voltsidis (GRE)

=== Round 4 ===
	Score	
Repechage
Mecnun Güler (TUR)	3–2	Adam Juretzko (GER)
Peter Puls (SWE)	4–6	Valeri Nikitin (EST)
Ari Härkänen (FIN)	0–12	Son Sang-pil (KOR)
Christian Eyer (FRA)	2–3	Vitaly Zhuk (BLR)
Giorgi Jinjvelashvili (GEO)		Bye

=== Round 5 ===
	Score	
Semifinals
Ryszard Wolny (POL)	0–1	Csaba Hirbik (HUN)
Aleksandr Tretyakov (RUS)	2–0	Biser Georgiev (BUL)
Repechage
Giorgi Jinjvelashvili (GEO)	3–10 DQ	Mecnun Güler (TUR)
Valeri Nikitin (EST)	2–9 Fall	Son Sang-pil (KOR)
Vitaly Zhuk (BLR)		Bye

=== Round 6 ===
	Score	
Repechage
Vitaly Zhuk (BLR)	0–0	Mecnun Güler (TUR)
Son Sang-pil (KOR)		Bye

=== Round 7 ===
	Score	
Repechage
Ryszard Wolny (POL)	1–5	Son Sang-pil (KOR)
Mecnun Güler (TUR)	0–11	Biser Georgiev (BUL)

=== Finals ===
	Score	
Bronze medal match
Son Sang-pil (KOR)	11–0	Biser Georgiev (BUL)
Final
Csaba Hirbik (HUN)	0–0	Aleksandr Tretyakov (RUS)
