= Wrestling at the 2000 Summer Olympics – Men's Greco-Roman 69 kg =

Men's Greco-Roman 69 kg at the Games of the XXVII Olympiad
- Venue: Sydney Convention and Exhibition Centre
- Date: 25–27 September 2000
- Competitors: 19 from 19 nations

Medalists
1st place, gold medalist(s)		Filiberto Azcuy	Cuba
2nd place, silver medalist(s)		Katsuhiko Nagata	Japan
3rd place, bronze medalist(s)		Aleksey Glushkov	Russia

The men's Greco-Roman 69 kilograms at the 2000 Summer Olympics as part of the wrestling program was held at the Sydney Convention and Exhibition Centre from September 25 to 27. The competition held with an elimination system of three or four wrestlers in each pool, with the winners qualify for the quarterfinals, semifinals and final by way of direct elimination.

== Schedule ==
All times are Australian Eastern Daylight Time (UTC+11:00)

Date	Time	Event
25 September 2000	09:30	Round 1
25 September 2000	17:00	Round 2
26 September 2000	09:30	Round 3
27 September 2000	09:30	Quarterfinals
27 September 2000	09:30	Semifinals
27 September 2000	17:00	Finals

== Results ==
Legend

- WO — Won by walkover

=== Elimination pools ===
==== Pool 1 ====
Pos	Athlete	Pld	W	L	CP	TP	Qualification
1	Son Sang-pil (KOR)	2	2	0	7	16	Knockout round
2	Adam Juretzko (GER)	2	1	1	3	2	
3	Mattias Schoberg (SWE)	2	0	2	0	0	

Source: Official Report

	Score		CP
Son Sang-pil (KOR)	12–0	Adam Juretzko (GER)	4–0 ST
Mattias Schoberg (SWE)	0–4	Son Sang-pil (KOR)	0–3 PO
Adam Juretzko (GER)	2–0	Mattias Schoberg (SWE)	3–0 PO

==== Pool 2 ====
Pos	Athlete	Pld	W	L	CP	TP	Qualification
1	Filiberto Azcuy (CUB)	2	2	0	7	14	Knockout round
2	Ender Memet (ROM)	2	1	1	5	14	
3	Ali Abdo (AUS)	2	0	2	0	0	

Source: Official Report

	Score		CP
Ender Memet (ROM)	3–4	Filiberto Azcuy (CUB)	1–3 PP
Ali Abdo (AUS)	0–11	Ender Memet (ROM)	0–4 ST
Filiberto Azcuy (CUB)	10–0	Ali Abdo (AUS)	4–0 ST

==== Pool 3 ====
Pos	Athlete	Pld	W	L	CP	TP	Qualification
1	Islam Dugushiev (AZE)	2	2	0	6	6	Knockout round
2	Juha Lappalainen (FIN)	2	1	1	3	2	
3	Parviz Zeidvand (IRI)	2	0	2	1	1	

Source: Official Report

	Score		CP
Parviz Zeidvand (IRI)	0–5	Islam Dugushiev (AZE)	0–3 PO
Juha Lappalainen (FIN)	2–1	Parviz Zeidvand (IRI)	3–1 PP
Islam Dugushiev (AZE)	1–0	Juha Lappalainen (FIN)	3–0 PO

==== Pool 4 ====
Pos	Athlete	Pld	W	L	CP	TP	Qualification
1	Valeri Nikitin (EST)	2	2	0	7	15	Knockout round
2	Ghani Yalouz (FRA)	2	1	1	3	13	
3	Csaba Hirbik (HUN)	2	0	2	2	7	

Source: Official Report

	Score		CP
Ghani Yalouz (FRA)	5–4	Csaba Hirbik (HUN)	3–1 PP
Valeri Nikitin (EST)	11–8 Fall	Ghani Yalouz (FRA)	4–0 TO
Csaba Hirbik (HUN)	3–4	Valeri Nikitin (EST)	1–3 PP

==== Pool 5 ====
Pos	Athlete	Pld	W	L	CP	TP	Qualification
1	Katsuhiko Nagata (JPN)	2	1	1	4 (Note: Head-to-head result: JPN 3–1 UZB.)	5	Knockout round
2	Ruslan Biktyakov (UZB)	2	1	1	4	4	
3	Heath Sims (USA)	2	1	1	3	4	

Source: Official Report
Notes:

	Score		CP
Ruslan Biktyakov (UZB)	3–0	Heath Sims (USA)	3–0 PO
Katsuhiko Nagata (JPN)	3–1	Ruslan Biktyakov (UZB)	3–1 PP
Heath Sims (USA)	4–2	Katsuhiko Nagata (JPN)	3–1 PP

==== Pool 6 ====
Pos	Athlete	Pld	W	L	CP	TP	Qualification
1	Aleksey Glushkov (RUS)	3	3	0	10	24	Knockout round
2	Ryszard Wolny (POL)	3	2	1	8	8	
3	Rustam Adzhi (UKR)	3	1	2	6	8	
4	Vladimir Kopytov (BLR)	3	0	3	0	0	

Source: Official Report

	Score		CP
Rustam Adzhi (UKR)	3–0 Fall	Vladimir Kopytov (BLR)	4–0 TO
Ryszard Wolny (POL)	1–8	Aleksey Glushkov (RUS)	1–3 PP
Rustam Adzhi (UKR)	1–7	Ryszard Wolny (POL)	1–3 PP
Vladimir Kopytov (BLR)	0–11 Fall	Aleksey Glushkov (RUS)	0–4 TO
Rustam Adzhi (UKR)	4–5	Aleksey Glushkov (RUS)	1–3 PP
Vladimir Kopytov (BLR)	WO	Ryszard Wolny (POL)	0–4 PA

=== Knockout round ===
Quarterfinals
Son Sang-pil (KOR)	2
Filiberto Azcuy (CUB)	9
Islam Dugushiev (AZE)	1
Valeri Nikitin (EST)	4

Semifinals
Filiberto Azcuy (CUB)	6
Valeri Nikitin (EST)	0
Katsuhiko Nagata (JPN)	3
Aleksey Glushkov (RUS)	1

Gold medal match
Filiberto Azcuy (CUB)	11
Katsuhiko Nagata (JPN)	0
Bronze medal match
Valeri Nikitin (EST)	0
Aleksey Glushkov (RUS)	5

Classification 5th–6th
Son Sang-pil (KOR)	WO
Islam Dugushiev (AZE)

== Final standing ==
Rank	Athlete
1st place, gold medalist(s)	Filiberto Azcuy (CUB)
2nd place, silver medalist(s)	Katsuhiko Nagata (JPN)
3rd place, bronze medalist(s)	Aleksey Glushkov (RUS)
4	Valeri Nikitin (EST)
5	Son Sang-pil (KOR)
6	Islam Dugushiev (AZE)
7	Ryszard Wolny (POL)
8	Rustam Adzhi (UKR)
9	Ender Memet (ROM)
10	Ruslan Biktyakov (UZB)
11	Ghani Yalouz (FRA)
12	Heath Sims (USA)
13	Adam Juretzko (GER)
14	Juha Lappalainen (FIN)
15	Csaba Hirbik (HUN)
16	Parviz Zeidvand (IRI)
17	Vladimir Kopytov (BLR)
18	Mattias Schoberg (SWE)
19	Ali Abdo (AUS)
