= Wrestling at the 1984 Summer Olympics – Men's Greco-Roman 62 kg =

Men's Greco-Roman 62 kg at the Games of the XXIII Olympiad
- Venue: Anaheim Convention Center
- Dates: 30 July–1 August 1984
- Competitors: 20 from 20 nations

Medalists
1st place, gold medalist(s)		Kim Weon-Kee	South Korea
2nd place, silver medalist(s)		Kent-Olle Johansson	Sweden
3rd place, bronze medalist(s)		Hugo Dietsche	Switzerland

The Men's Greco-Roman 62 kg at the 1984 Summer Olympics was part of the wrestling program that was held at the Anaheim Convention Center in Anaheim, California.

== Medalists ==
Gold	Kim Weon-Kee; South Korea
Silver	Kent-Olle Johansson; Sweden
Bronze	Hugo Dietsche; Switzerland

== Tournament results ==
The wrestlers are divided into 2 groups. The winner of each group decided by a double-elimination system.

Legend

- TF — Won by Fall
- ST — Won by Technical Superiority, 12 points difference
- PP — Won by Points, 1–7 points difference, the loser with points
- PO — Won by Points, 1–7 points difference, the loser without points
- SP — Won by Points, 8–11 points difference, the loser with points
- SO — Won by Points, 8–11 points difference, the loser without points
- P0 — Won by Passivity, scoring zero points
- P1 — Won by Passivity, while leading by 1–7 points
- PS — Won by Passivity, while leading by 8–11 points
- DC — Won by Decision, 0–0 score
- PA — Won by Opponent Injury
- DQ — Won by Forfeit
- DNA — Did not appear
- L — Losses
- ER — Round of Elimination
- CP — Classification Points
- TP — Technical Points

=== Eliminatory round ===
==== Group A ====
L		CP	TP		L
Round 1
0	Abdurrahim Kuzu (USA)	3–0 PO	3–0	Morten Brekke (NOR)	1
1	Alaattin Özgür (TUR)	1–3 PP	2–7	Kent-Olle Johansson (SWE)	0
1	Daniel Navarrete (ARG)	0–4 ST	0–13	Bernd Gabriel (FRG)	0
0	Gilles Jalabert (FRA)	3–0 PO	1–0	Douglas Yeats (CAN)	1
0	Constantin Uţă (ROU)	4–0 ST	15–2	Zhang Dequn (CHN)	1
Round 2
0	Abdurrahim Kuzu (USA)	3.5-.5 SP	12–4	Alaattin Özgür (TUR)	2
2	Morten Brekke (NOR)	1–3 PP	4–8	Kent-Olle Johansson (SWE)	0
2	Daniel Navarrete (ARG)	0–4 ST	0–13	Gilles Jalabert (FRA)	0
0	Bernd Gabriel (FRG)	3–1 PP	8–7	Constantin Uţă (ROU)	1
1	Douglas Yeats (CAN)	4–0 ST	12–0	Zhang Dequn (CHN)	2
Round 3
0	Abdurrahim Kuzu (USA)	3–1 PP	3–3	Kent-Olle Johansson (SWE)	1
0	Bernd Gabriel (FRG)	4–0 ST	12–0	Gilles Jalabert (FRA)	1
1	Douglas Yeats (CAN)	3–1 PP	4–3	Constantin Uţă (ROU)	2
Round 4
0	Abdurrahim Kuzu (USA)	3–0 P1	4:37	Bernd Gabriel (FRG)	1
0	Kent-Olle Johansson (SWE)	3–1 DC	0–0	Gilles Jalabert (FRA)	2
1	Douglas Yeats (CAN)			Bye	
Round 5
1	Douglas Yeats (CAN)	3–1 DC	0–0	Abdurrahim Kuzu (USA)	1
1	Kent-Olle Johansson (SWE)	3–1 PP	9–4	Bernd Gabriel (FRG)	2
Final
	Abdurrahim Kuzu (USA)	3–1 PP	3–3	Kent-Olle Johansson (SWE)	
	Douglas Yeats (CAN)	3–1 DC	0–0	Abdurrahim Kuzu (USA)	
	Kent-Olle Johansson (SWE)	3–1 PP	3–2	Douglas Yeats (CAN)	

Wrestler	L	ER	CP	Final
Kent-Olle Johansson (SWE)	1	-	13	4
Abdurrahim Kuzu (USA)	1	-	13.5	4
Douglas Yeats (CAN)	1	-	10	4
Bernd Gabriel (FRG)	2	5	12	
Gilles Jalabert (FRA)	2	4	8	
Constantin Uţă (ROU)	2	3	6	
Alaattin Özgür (TUR)	2	2	1.5	
Morten Brekke (NOR)	2	2	1	
Daniel Navarrete (ARG)	2	2	0	
Zhang Dequn (CHN)	2	2	0	

==== Group B ====
L		CP	TP		L
Round 1
1	Hannu Lahtinen (FIN)	0–3 PO	0–3	Seiichi Osanai (JPN)	0
1	Herbert Nigsch (AUT)	1–3 PP	7–12	Brahim Loksairi (MAR)	0
1	Salem Bekhit (EGY)	1–3 PP	4–6	Stelios Mygiakis (GRE)	0
1	Roberto Aceves (MEX)	0–4 ST	0–13	Kim Weon-Kee (KOR)	0
0	Hugo Dietsche (SUI)	4–0 ST	12–0	Gustavo Manzur (ESA)	1
Round 2
1	Hannu Lahtinen (FIN)	3–1 PP	2–1	Herbert Nigsch (AUT)	2
0	Seiichi Osanai (JPN)	3.5-.5 PP	13–5	Brahim Loksairi (MAR)	1
1	Salem Bekhit (EGY)	4–0 ST	13–0	Roberto Aceves (MEX)	2
1	Stelios Mygiakis (GRE)	1–3 PP	1–6	Hugo Dietsche (SUI)	0
0	Kim Weon-Kee (KOR)	4–0 TF	0:20	Gustavo Manzur (ESA)	2
Round 3
1	Hannu Lahtinen (FIN)	4–0 ST	14–0	Brahim Loksairi (MAR)	2
1	Seiichi Osanai (JPN)	1–3 PP	7–11	Salem Bekhit (EGY)	1
2	Stelios Mygiakis (GRE)	0–4 ST	2–14	Kim Weon-Kee (KOR)	0
0	Hugo Dietsche (SUI)			Bye	
Round 4
1	Hugo Dietsche (SUI)	1–3 PP	2–8	Seiichi Osanai (JPN)	1
2	Hannu Lahtinen (FIN)	0–4 TF	4:03	Salem Bekhit (EGY)	1
0	Kim Weon-Kee (KOR)			Bye	
Round 5
0	Kim Weon-Kee (KOR)	3–1 PP	4–2	Seiichi Osanai (JPN)	2
1	Hugo Dietsche (SUI)	3.5–0 PS	5:11	Salem Bekhit (EGY)	2
Final
	Kim Weon-Kee (KOR)	4–0 TF	1:56	Hugo Dietsche (SUI)	

Wrestler	L	ER	CP	Final
Kim Weon-Kee (KOR)	0	-	15	4
Hugo Dietsche (SUI)	1	-	11.5	0
Salem Bekhit (EGY)	2	5	12	
Seiichi Osanai (JPN)	2	5	11.5	
Hannu Lahtinen (FIN)	2	4	7	
Stelios Mygiakis (GRE)	2	3	4	
Brahim Loksairi (MAR)	2	3	3.5	
Herbert Nigsch (AUT)	2	2	2	
Roberto Aceves (MEX)	2	2	0	
Gustavo Manzur (ESA)	2	2	0	

=== Final round ===
	CP	TP	
5th place match
Douglas Yeats (CAN)	4–0 ST	15–3	Salem Bekhit (EGY)
Bronze medal match
Abdurrahim Kuzu (USA)	1–3 PP	4–8	Hugo Dietsche (SUI)
Gold medal match
Kent-Olle Johansson (SWE)	1–3 DC	0–0	Kim Weon-Kee (KOR)

== Final standings ==
1. Kim Weon-Kee (KOR)
2. Kent-Olle Johansson (SWE)
3. Hugo Dietsche (SUI)
4. Abdurrahim Kuzu (USA)
5. Douglas Yeats (CAN)
6. Salem Bekhit (EGY)
7. Bernd Gabriel (FRG)
8. Seiichi Osanai (JPN)
