= Wrestling at the 1988 Summer Olympics – Men's Greco-Roman 62 kg =

Men's Greco-Roman 62 kg at the Games of the XXIV Olympiad
- Venue: Sangmu Gymnasium
- Dates: 18–20 September 1988
- Competitors: 17 from 17 nations

Medalists
1st place, gold medalist(s)		Kamandar Madzhidov	Soviet Union
2nd place, silver medalist(s)		Zhivko Vangelov	Bulgaria
3rd place, bronze medalist(s)		An Dae-hyun	South Korea

The Men's Greco-Roman 62 kg at the 1988 Summer Olympics as part of the wrestling program were held at the Sangmu Gymnasium, Seongnam.

== Tournament results ==
The wrestlers are divided into 2 groups. The winner of each group decided by a double-elimination system.

Legend

- TF — Won by Fall
- SP — Won by Superiority, 12-14 points difference, the loser with points
- SO — Won by Superiority, 12-14 points difference, the loser without points
- ST — Won by Technical Superiority, 15 points difference
- PP — Won by Points, the loser with technical points
- PO — Won by Points, the loser without technical points
- P0 — Won by Passivity, scoring zero points
- P1 — Won by Passivity, while leading by 1-11 points
- PS — Won by Passivity, while leading by 12-14 points
- PA — Won by Opponent Injury
- DQ — Won by Forfeit
- DNA — Did not appear
- L — Losses
- ER — Round of Elimination
- CP — Classification Points
- TP — Technical Points

=== Eliminatory round ===
==== Group A ====
L		CP	TP		L
Round 1
0	Isaac Anderson (USA)	3-1 PP	3-2	Mieczysław Tracz (POL)	1
0	Brahim Loksairi (MAR)	3-1 PP	2-1	Habib Lakhal (TUN)	1
1	Ahad Javan Saleh (IRI)	1-3 PP	3-8	Kamandar Madzhidov (URS)	0
0	An Dae-hyun (KOR)	3-0 P1	3:59	Gilles Jalabert (FRA)	1
0	Hu Guohong (CHN)			Bye	
Round 2
1	Hu Guohong (CHN)	0-3 P1	4:13	Isaac Anderson (USA)	0
1	Mieczysław Tracz (POL)	3-0 P1	5:31	Brahim Loksairi (MAR)	1
2	Habib Lakhal (TUN)	0-3 PO	0-5	Ahad Javansalehi (IRI)	1
0	Kamandar Madzhidov (URS)	3-0 P1	5:24	An Dae-hyun (KOR)	1
1	Gilles Jalabert (FRA)			Bye	
Round 3
1	Gilles Jalabert (FRA)	3-1 PP	13-4	Hu Guohong (CHN)	2
0	Isaac Anderson (USA)	3-0 P1	3:21	Brahim Loksairi (MAR)	2
2	Mieczysław Tracz (POL)	0-3 PO	0-3	Kamandar Madzhidov (URS)	0
2	Ahad Javansalehi (IRI)	0-4 DQ	4:55	An Dae-Hyun (KOR)	1
Round 4
2	Gilles Jalabert (FRA)	0-3 P1	4:14	Kamandar Madzhidov (URS)	0
1	Isaac Anderson (USA)	0-3 PO	0-2	An Dae-hyun (KOR)	1
Round 5
2	Isaac Anderson (USA)	1-3 PP	1-2	Kamandar Madzhidov (URS)	0
1	An Dae-hyun (KOR)			Bye	

Wrestler	L	ER	CP
Kamandar Madzhidov (URS)	0	-	15
An Dae-hyun (KOR)	1	-	10
Isaac Anderson (USA)	2	5	10
Gilles Jalabert (FRA)	2	4	3
Ahad Javansalehi (IRI)	2	3	4
Mieczysław Tracz (POL)	2	3	4
Brahim Loksairi (MAR)	2	3	3
Hu Guohong (CHN)	2	3	1
Habib Lakhal (TUN)	2	2	1

==== Group B ====
L		CP	TP		L
Round 1
1	Jukka Loikas (FIN)	1-3 PP	6-9	Shigeki Nishiguchi (JPN)	0
0	Zhivko Vangelov (BUL)	3-0 PO	1-0	Jenő Bódi (HUN)	1
0	Peter Behl (FRG)	4-0 ST	15-0	Carlos Fernández (ESP)	1
0	Hugo Dietsche (SUI)	3-1 PP	3-2	Zeki Şahin (TUR)	1
Round 2
2	Jukka Loikas (FIN)	0-3 PO	0-7	Zhivko Vangelov (BUL)	0
1	Shigeki Nishiguchi (JPN)	0-3 PO	0-7	Jenő Bódi (HUN)	1
1	Peter Behl (FRG)	0-3 P1	4:59	Hugo Dietsche (SUI)	0
2	Carlos Fernández (ESP)	0–3.5 SO	0-12	Zeki Şahin (TUR)	1
Round 3
2	Shigeki Nishiguchi (JPN)	0-4 TF	1:06	Zhivko Vangelov (BUL)	0
1	Jenő Bódi (HUN)	3-1 PP	4-1	Hugo Dietsche (SUI)	1
1	Peter Behl (FRG)	3-0 P1	4:07	Zeki Şahin (TUR)	2
Round 4
0	Zhivko Vangelov (BUL)	4-0 TF	2:14	Hugo Dietsche (SUI)	2
1	Jenő Bódi (HUN)	3-1 PP	10-1	Peter Behl (FRG)	2

Wrestler	L	ER	CP
Zhivko Vangelov (BUL)	0	-	14
Jenő Bódi (HUN)	1	-	9
Peter Behl (FRG)	2	4	8
Hugo Dietsche (SUI)	2	4	7
Zeki Şahin (TUR)	2	3	4.5
Shigeki Nishiguchi (JPN)	2	3	3
Jukka Loikas (FIN)	2	2	1
Carlos Fernández (ESP)	2	2	0

=== Final round ===
	CP	TP	
7th place match
Gilles Jalabert (FRA)	4-0 PA		Hugo Dietsche (SUI)
5th place match
Isaac Anderson (USA)	1-3 PP	1-5	Peter Behl (FRG)
Bronze medal match
An Dae-hyun (KOR)	3-0 P1	3:15	Jenő Bódi (HUN)
Gold medal match
Kamandar Madzhidov (URS)	3-1 PP	6-2	Zhivko Vangelov (BUL)

== Final standings ==
1. Kamandar Madzhidov (URS)
2. Zhivko Vangelov (BUL)
3. An Dae-hyun (KOR)
4. Jenő Bódi (HUN)
5. Peter Behl (FRG)
6. Isaac Anderson (USA)
7. Gilles Jalabert (FRA)
8. Hugo Dietsche (SUI)
