= 2001 World Wrestling Championships – Men's Greco-Roman 69 kg =

Men's Greco-Roman 69 kg at the 2001 World Championships
- Venue: Dimitris Tofalos Arena
- Dates: 7–9 December 2001
- Competitors: 28 from 28 nations

Medalists
| gold medal | Filiberto Azcuy | Cuba |
| silver medal | Aleksey Glushkov | Russia |
| bronze medal | Rustam Adzhi | Ukraine |

The men's Greco-Roman 69 kilograms is a competition featured at the 2001 World Wrestling Championships, and was held at the Dimitris Tofalos Arena in Patras, Greece from 7 to 9 December 2001.

== Results ==
Legend

- F — Won by fall
- R — Retired

=== Preliminary round ===
==== Pool 1 ====
| Pos | Athlete | Pld | W | L | CP | TP | SWE | POL | FIN |
|---|---|---|---|---|---|---|---|---|---|
| 1 | Jimmy Samuelsson (SWE) | 2 | 2 | 0 | 6 | 7 | — | 3–2 | 4–0 |
| 2 | Szymon Kogut (POL) | 2 | 1 | 1 | 4 | 5 | 1–3 PP | — | 3–2 |
| 3 | Juha Lappalainen (FIN) | 2 | 0 | 2 | 1 | 2 | 0–3 PO | 1–3 PP | — |

Source: Japan Wrestling

==== Pool 2 ====
| Pos | Athlete | Pld | W | L | CP | TP | CZE | FRA | IND |
|---|---|---|---|---|---|---|---|---|---|
| 1 | Ondřej Jaroš (CZE) | 2 | 2 | 0 | 6 | 10 | — | 3–1 | 7–0 |
| 2 | Aurélien Bozonet (FRA) | 2 | 1 | 1 | 4 | 5 | 1–3 PP | — | 4–0 |
| 3 | Ravinder Maan (IND) | 2 | 0 | 2 | 0 | 0 | 0–3 PO | 0–3 PO | — |

Source: Japan Wrestling

==== Pool 3 ====
| Pos | Athlete | Pld | W | L | CP | TP | IRI | HUN | CHN |
|---|---|---|---|---|---|---|---|---|---|
| 1 | Parviz Zeidvand (IRI) | 2 | 2 | 0 | 7 | 14 | — | 3–2 | 11–0 |
| 2 | Csaba Hirbik (HUN) | 2 | 1 | 1 | 4 | 5 | 1–3 PP | — | 3–1 |
| 3 | Lian Chunzhi (CHN) | 2 | 0 | 2 | 1 | 1 | 0–4 ST | 1–3 PP | — |

Source: Japan Wrestling

==== Pool 4 ====
| Pos | Athlete | Pld | W | L | CP | TP | CUB | GEO | GRE |
|---|---|---|---|---|---|---|---|---|---|
| 1 | Filiberto Azcuy (CUB) | 2 | 2 | 0 | 7 | 13 | — | 3–0 | 10–0 |
| 2 | Aleksandr Dokturishvili (GEO) | 2 | 1 | 1 | 3 | 6 | 0–3 PO | — | 6–0 |
| 3 | Konstantinos Papadopoulos (GRE) | 2 | 0 | 2 | 0 | 0 | 0–4 ST | 0–3 PO | — |

Source: Japan Wrestling

==== Pool 5 ====
| Pos | Athlete | Pld | W | L | CP | TP | KOR | BUL | USA |
|---|---|---|---|---|---|---|---|---|---|
| 1 | Son Sang-pil (KOR) | 2 | 2 | 0 | 6 | 10 | — | 4–0 | 6–2 |
| 2 | Velin Marinov (BUL) | 2 | 1 | 1 | 3 | 3 | 0–3 PO | — | 3–2 |
| 3 | Marcel Cooper (USA) | 2 | 0 | 2 | 2 | 4 | 1–3 PP | 1–3 PP | — |

Source: Japan Wrestling

==== Pool 6 ====
| Pos | Athlete | Pld | W | L | CP | TP | RUS | UZB | PER |
|---|---|---|---|---|---|---|---|---|---|
| 1 | Aleksey Glushkov (RUS) | 2 | 2 | 0 | 7 | 22 | — | 12–3 | 10–0 |
| 2 | Ruslan Biktyakov (UZB) | 2 | 1 | 1 | 4 | 8 | 1–3 PP | — | 5–1 |
| 3 | Enrique Cubas (PER) | 2 | 0 | 2 | 1 | 1 | 0–4 ST | 1–3 PP | — |

Source: Japan Wrestling

==== Pool 7 ====
| Pos | Athlete | Pld | W | L | CP | TP | GER | ROM | CHI |
|---|---|---|---|---|---|---|---|---|---|
| 1 | Max Schwindt (GER) | 2 | 2 | 0 | 7 | 14 | — | 4–0 | 10–0 |
| 2 | Adrian Ozsda (ROM) | 2 | 1 | 1 | 4 | 10 | 0–3 PO | — | 10–0 |
| 3 | Mario Valdivia (CHI) | 2 | 0 | 2 | 0 | 0 | 0–4 ST | 0–4 ST | — |

Source: Japan Wrestling

==== Pool 8 ====
| Pos | Athlete | Pld | W | L | CP | TP | ESP | JPN | VEN |
|---|---|---|---|---|---|---|---|---|---|
| 1 | Moisés Sánchez (ESP) | 2 | 2 | 0 | 6 | 14 | — | 9–2 | 5–3 |
| 2 | Katsuhiko Nagata (JPN) | 2 | 1 | 1 | 4 | 6 | 1–3 PP | — | 4–1 |
| 3 | Endrix Arteaga (VEN) | 2 | 0 | 2 | 2 | 4 | 1–3 PP | 1–3 PP | — |

Source: Japan Wrestling

==== Pool 9 ====
| Pos | Athlete | Pld | W | L | CP | TP | UKR | TUR | BLR | SUI |
|---|---|---|---|---|---|---|---|---|---|---|
| 1 | Rustam Adzhi (UKR) | 3 | 3 | 0 | 9 | 10 | — | 4–1 | 3–1 | 3–2 |
| 2 | Mahmut Altay (TUR) | 3 | 2 | 1 | 8 | 11 | 1–3 PP | — | 3–0 | 7–0 Fall |
| 3 | Andrei Lisitsa (BLR) | 3 | 1 | 2 | 4 | 4 | 1–3 PP | 0–3 PO | — | 3–0 |
| 4 | Daniel Schnyder (SUI) | 3 | 0 | 3 | 1 | 2 | 1–3 PP | 0–4 TO | 0–3 PO | — |

Source: Japan Wrestling

=== Knockout round ===
Round of 16
Jimmy Samuelsson (SWE) | 3
Ondřej Jaroš (CZE) | 0

Quarterfinals
Jimmy Samuelsson (SWE) | 3
Parviz Zeidvand (IRI) | 4^{R}
Filiberto Azcuy (CUB) | 5
Son Sang-pil (KOR) | 0
Aleksey Glushkov (RUS) | 4
Max Schwindt (GER) | 0
Moisés Sánchez (ESP) | 1
Rustam Adzhi (UKR) | 11

Semifinals
Jimmy Samuelsson (SWE) | 4
Filiberto Azcuy (CUB) | 8
Aleksey Glushkov (RUS) | 8
Rustam Adzhi (UKR) | 1

Final
Filiberto Azcuy (CUB) | 4
Aleksey Glushkov (RUS) | 0
Bronze medal match
Jimmy Samuelsson (SWE) | 0
Rustam Adzhi (UKR) | 6^{F}
