= Greece at the 1992 Summer Olympics =

- IOC code: GRE
- NOC: Committee of the Olympic Games

in Barcelona Spain
- Competitors: 70 (56 men and 14 women) in 17 sports
- Flag bearer: Lambros Papakostas
- Medals Ranked 26th: Gold 2 Silver 0 Bronze 0 Total 2

Summer Olympics appearances (overview)
- 1896; 1900; 1904; 1908; 1912; 1920; 1924; 1928; 1932; 1936; 1948; 1952; 1956; 1960; 1964; 1968; 1972; 1976; 1980; 1984; 1988; 1992; 1996; 2000; 2004; 2008; 2012; 2016; 2020; 2024; 2028

Other related appearances
- 1906 Intercalated Games

Greece competed at the 1992 Summer Olympics in Barcelona, Spain. Greek athletes have competed in every Summer Olympic Games. 70 competitors, 56 men and 14 women, took part in 53 events in 17 sports.

== Medalists ==
Medal	Name	Sport	Event	Date
Gold	Pyrros Dimas	Weightlifting	Men's 82.5 kg	31 July
Gold	Voula Patoulidou	Athletics	Women's 100 metres hurdles	6 August

== Competitors ==
The following is the list of number of competitors in the Games.

Sport	Men	Women	Total
Athletics	7	4	11
Boxing	1	–	1
Cycling	1	0	1
Diving	0	1	1
Fencing	1	0	1
Gymnastics	0	2	2
Judo	1	1	2
Modern pentathlon	1	–	1
Rowing	1	1	2
Sailing	9	0	9
Shooting	1	2	3
Swimming	2	0	2
Synchronized swimming	–	1	1
Tennis	2	2	4
Water polo	13	–	13
Weightlifting	5	–	5
Wrestling	11	–	11
Total	56	14	70

== Athletics ==
Men
Track and road events

Athlete	Event	Heats		Quarterfinal		Semifinal		Final	
Athlete	Event	Result	Rank	Result	Rank	Result	Rank	Result	Rank
Athanasios Kalogiannis	400 metres hurdles	49.52	21	—N/a		Did not advance			

Field events

Athlete	Event	Qualification		Final	
Athlete	Event	Distance	Position	Distance	Position
Kosmas Michalopoulos	High jump	2.10	33	Did not advance	
Lambros Papakostas	High jump	2.20	19	Did not advance	
Christos Pallakis	Pole vault	5.30	23	Did not advance	
Kostas Koukodimos	Long jump	8.22	3 Q	8.04	6
Spyros Vasdekis	Long jump	7.82	16	Did not advance	
Savvas Saritzoglou	Hammer throw	74.16	14	Did not advance	

Women
Track and road events

Athlete	Event	Heats		Quarterfinal		Semifinal		Final	
Athlete	Event	Result	Rank	Result	Rank	Result	Rank	Result	Rank
Voula Patoulidou	100 metres hurdles	13.14	12 Q	13.05	6 Q	12.88	3 Q	12.64	1st place, gold medalist(s)

Field events

Athlete	Event	Qualification		Final	
Athlete	Event	Distance	Position	Distance	Position
Niki Bakogianni	High jump	1.88	24	Did not advance	
Niki Gavera	High jump	1.83	33	Did not advance	
Anna Verouli	Javelin throw	56.96	21	Did not advance	

== Boxing ==
Athlete	Event	Round of 32	Round of 16	Quarterfinals	Semifinals	Final	
Athlete	Event	Opposition Result	Opposition Result	Opposition Result	Opposition Result	Opposition Result	Rank
Georgios Stefanopoulos	Heavyweight	Bye	Rückschloss (TCH); L RSC R1	Did not advance			

== Cycling ==
One male cyclist represented Greece in 1992.

=== Track ===
Pursuit

Athlete	Event	Qualification		Quarterfinals	Semifinals	Final	
Athlete	Event	Time	Rank	Opposition Time	Opposition Time	Opposition Time	Rank
Georgios Portelanos	Men's individual pursuit	4:46.345	18	Did not advance			

Points race

Athlete	Event	Qualification			Final		
Athlete	Event	Laps	Points	Rank	Laps	Points	Rank
Georgios Portelanos	Points race	–1 lap	3	17	Did not advance		

== Diving ==
Women

Athlete	Event	Qualification		Final	
Athlete	Event	Points	Rank	Points	Rank
Eleni Stavridou	3 m springboard	240.42	26	Did not advance	

== Fencing ==
One male fencer represented Greece in 1992.

Individual
Pool stage

Athlete	Event	Group Stage						
Athlete	Event	Opposition Result	Opposition Result	Opposition Result	Opposition Result	Opposition Result	Opposition Result	Rank
Zisis Babanasis	Men's sabre	Scalzo (ITA); L 0–5	Ducheix (FRA); W 5–3	Pogosov (EUN); W 5–3	Plourde (CAN); W 5–4	van Garderen (RSA); W 5–1	Lofton (USA); L 3–5	15 Q

Elimination phase

Athlete	Event	Round 1	Round 2	Round 3	Round 4	Repechage				Quarterfinals	Semifinals	Final	
Athlete	Event	Round 1	Round 2	Round 3	Round 4	Round 1	Round 2	Round 3	Round 4	Quarterfinals	Semifinals	Final	
Athlete	Event	Opposition Result	Opposition Result	Opposition Result	Opposition Result	Opposition Result	Opposition Result	Opposition Result	Opposition Result	Opposition Result	Opposition Result	Opposition Result	Rank
Zisis Babanasis	Men's sabre	Bye	Köves (HUN); L 1–2	Did not advance		Grigore (ROU); L 0–2	Did not advance						

== Gymnastics ==
=== Rhythmic ===
Athlete	Event	Qualification						Final						
Athlete	Event	Hoop	Rope	Clubs	Ball	Total	Rank	Qualification	Hoop	Rope	Clubs	Ball	Total	Rank
Maria Sansaridou	Individual	9.275	9.400	9.400	9.325	37.125	10 Q	18.562	9.325	—N/a	9.150	—N/a	37.037	11
Areti Sinapidou	Individual	9.275	9.200	9.150	9.225	36.850	12 Q	18.425	9.400	—N/a			27.825	14

== Judo ==
Men

Athlete	Event	Round of 64	Round of 32	Round of 16	Quarterfinals	Semifinals	Repechage			Final	
Athlete	Event	Round of 64	Round of 32	Round of 16	Quarterfinals	Semifinals	Round 1	Round 2	Round 3	Final	
Athlete	Event	Opposition Result	Opposition Result	Opposition Result	Opposition Result	Opposition Result	Opposition Result	Opposition Result	Opposition Result	Opposition Result	Rank
Ilias Nikas	95 kg	Bye	Salgado (CUB); L Ippon	Did not advance							

Women

Athlete	Event	Round of 32	Round of 16	Quarterfinals	Semifinals	Repechage			Final	
Athlete	Event	Round of 32	Round of 16	Quarterfinals	Semifinals	Round 1	Round 2	Round 3	Final	
Athlete	Event	Opposition Result	Opposition Result	Opposition Result	Opposition Result	Opposition Result	Opposition Result	Opposition Result	Opposition Result	Rank
Maria Karagiannopoulou	52 kg	Rendle (GBR); L Ippon	Did not advance							

== Modern pentathlon ==
One male pentathletes represented Greece in 1992.

Athlete	Event	Fencing (épée one touch)			Swimming (300 m freestyle)			Shooting (Air pistol)			Riding (show jumping)			Running (4000 m)			Total points	Final rank
Athlete	Event	Results	Rank	MP points	Time	Rank	MP points	Points	Rank	MP Points	Penalties	Rank	MP points	Time	Rank	MP Points	Total points	Final rank
Alexandros Nikolopoulos	Individual	19–46	61	541	3:14.4	4	1320	191	7	1135	90	23	1010	13:55.9	42	1060	5066	31

== Rowing ==
Men

Athlete	Event	Heats		Repechage		Semifinals		Final	
Athlete	Event	Time	Rank	Time	Rank	Time	Rank	Time	Rank
Konstantinos Kariotis	Single sculls	7:23.00	4 R	7:01.57	1 SFA/B	7:12.91	5 FB	7:19.47	11

Women

Athlete	Event	Heats		Repechage		Semifinals		Final	
Athlete	Event	Time	Rank	Time	Rank	Time	Rank	Time	Rank
Tonia Svaier	Single sculls	7:51.35	3 SF	—N/a		7:42.77	5 FB	8:06.65	7

== Sailing ==
Men

Athlete	Event	Race										Net points	Final rank
Athlete	Event	1	2	3	4	5	6	7	8	9	10	Net points	Final rank
Nikolaos Kaklamanakis	Lechner A-390	2	9	16	~~DSQ~~	6	8	5	14	10	6	123.4	9
Armanto Ortolano	Finn	18	7	~~PMS~~	1	6	9	12	—N/a			81.7	9
Andreas Kosmatopoulos; Thanasis Pakhoumas	470	21	28	5	12	9	~~DSQ~~	27	—N/a			137.0	17

Open

Athlete	Event	Race							Net points	Final rank
Athlete	Event	1	2	3	4	5	6	7	Net points	Final rank
Iakovos Kiseoglou; Dimitrios Boukis	Star	18	8	11	~~21~~	7	10	1	84.0	8
Tassos Boudouris; Dimitrios Deligiannis; Michael Mitakis	Soling	20	16	~~PMS~~	19	22	9	—N/a	116.0	20

== Shooting ==
Men

Athlete	Event	Qualification		Final	
Athlete	Event	Points	Rank	Points	Rank
Dimitrios Baltas	10 metre air pistol	570	35	Did not advance	
Dimitrios Baltas	25 metre rapid fire pistol	575	25	Did not advance	
Dimitrios Baltas	50 metre pistol	543	37	Did not advance	

Women

Athlete	Event	Qualification		Final	
Athlete	Event	Points	Rank	Points	Rank
Agi Kasoumi	10 metre air pistol	371	39	Did not advance	
Agi Kasoumi	25 metre pistol	577	11	Did not advance	
Aikaterini Kotroni	10 metre air rifle	383	35	Did not advance	

== Swimming ==
Men

Athlete	Event	Heats		Final A/B	
Athlete	Event	Time	Rank	Time	Rank
Nikos Paleokrassas	50 metre freestyle	23.51	26	Did not advance	
Nikos Paleokrassas	100 metre freestyle	53.47	53	Did not advance	
Nikos Steliou	50 metre freestyle	23.55	28	Did not advance	

== Synchronized swimming ==
One synchronized swimmer represented Greece in 1992.

Athlete	Event	Figures		Qualification			Final		
Athlete	Event	Points	Rank	Points	Total (Figures + Qualification)	Rank	Points	Total (Figures + Final)	Rank
Christina Thalassinidou	Solo	85.884	15 Q	93.880	179.764	6 Q	94.360	180.244	6

== Tennis ==
Men

Athlete	Event	Round of 64	Round of 32	Round of 16	Quarterfinals	Semifinals	Final	
Athlete	Event	Opposition Result	Opposition Result	Opposition Result	Opposition Result	Opposition Result	Opposition Result	Rank
Tasos Bavelas; Konstantinos Efraimoglou	Doubles	Bye	Forcellini / Francini (SMR); W (6–1, 6–1, 6–2)	Becker / Stich (GER); L (3–6, 1–6, 4–6)	Did not advance			

Women

Athlete	Event	Round of 64	Round of 32	Round of 16	Quarterfinals	Semifinals	Final	
Athlete	Event	Opposition Result	Opposition Result	Opposition Result	Opposition Result	Opposition Result	Opposition Result	Rank
Christina Papadaki	Singles	Blumberga (LAT); L (6–4, 1–6, 2–6)	Did not advance					
Christina Papadaki; Christina Zachariadou	Doubles	Bye	Li / Tang (CHN); L (6–7, 3–6)	Did not advance				

== Water polo ==
Summary

Key:

- FT – After full time.

Team	Event	Group stage						Classification round		
Team	Event	Opposition Score	Opposition Score	Opposition Score	Opposition Score	Opposition Score	Rank	Opposition Score	Opposition Score	Rank
Greece men's	Men's tournament	Cuba; L 9–10	Spain; L 6–11	Netherlands; D 4–4	Hungary; L 7–12	Italy; L 6–8	6	France; W 10–6	Czechoslovakia; W 10–8	10

=== Men's tournament ===
Team roster
- Kyriakos Giannopoulos
- Georgios Mavrotas
- Dimitrios Seletopoulos
- Anastasios Papanastasiou
- Evangelos Pateros
- Epaminondas Samartzidis
- Nikolaos Venetopoulos
- Filippos Kaiafas
- Evangelos Patras
- Gerasimos Voltirakis
- Theodoros Lorantos
- Konstantinos Loudis
- Dimitrios Bitsakos

Group play

Pos	Team	Pld	W	D	L	GF	GA	GD	Pts
1	Spain	5	4	1	0	52	36	+16	9
2	Italy	5	3	2	0	41	34	+7	8
3	Hungary	5	2	2	1	49	46	+3	6
4	Cuba	5	2	0	3	50	53	−3	4
5	Netherlands	5	0	2	3	36	46	−10	2
6	Greece	5	0	1	4	32	45	−13	1

1 August 1992; 19:45	Cuba	10–9	Greece	Piscina Municipal de Montjuïc; Referees: David Bathurst (GBR), John Whitehouse (AUS)
1 August 1992; 19:45	Score by quarters: 4–2, 0–3, 3–3, 3–1			Piscina Municipal de Montjuïc; Referees: David Bathurst (GBR), John Whitehouse (AUS)
1 August 1992; 19:45	Pérez 5	Goals	Seletopoulos 3	Piscina Municipal de Montjuïc; Referees: David Bathurst (GBR), John Whitehouse (AUS)

2 August 1992; 21:00	Spain	11–6	Greece	Piscina Municipal de Montjuïc; Referees: Jürgen Blan (GER), Roy Gunell (CAN)
2 August 1992; 21:00	Score by quarters: 1–3, 2–1, 4–1, 4–1			Piscina Municipal de Montjuïc; Referees: Jürgen Blan (GER), Roy Gunell (CAN)
2 August 1992; 21:00	Estiarte 3	Goals	Samartzidis 2	Piscina Municipal de Montjuïc; Referees: Jürgen Blan (GER), Roy Gunell (CAN)

3 August 1992; 18:30	Greece	4–4	Netherlands	Piscina Municipal de Montjuïc; Referees: Miroslav Radenović (YUG), Roy Gunell (CAN)
3 August 1992; 18:30	Score by quarters: 0–0, 1–0, 2–1, 1–2			Piscina Municipal de Montjuïc; Referees: Miroslav Radenović (YUG), Roy Gunell (CAN)
3 August 1992; 18:30	four players 1	Goals	Scherrenburg, Nieuwenburg 2	Piscina Municipal de Montjuïc; Referees: Miroslav Radenović (YUG), Roy Gunell (CAN)

5 August 1992; 18:45	Hungary	12–7	Greece	Piscina Municipal de Montjuïc; Referees: Vladimir Prikhodko (EUN), Eduard Prelovský (TCH)
5 August 1992; 18:45	Score by quarters: 5–3, 2–1, 1–1, 4–2			Piscina Municipal de Montjuïc; Referees: Vladimir Prikhodko (EUN), Eduard Prelovský (TCH)
5 August 1992; 18:45	Benedek 5	Goals	Giannopoulos 3	Piscina Municipal de Montjuïc; Referees: Vladimir Prikhodko (EUN), Eduard Prelovský (TCH)

6 August 1992; 17:30	Italy	8–6	Greece	Piscina Municipal de Montjuïc; Referees: Miroslav Radenović (YUG), Masaru Masaoka (JPN)
6 August 1992; 17:30	Score by quarters: 2–2, 1–1, 3–2, 2–1			Piscina Municipal de Montjuïc; Referees: Miroslav Radenović (YUG), Masaru Masaoka (JPN)
6 August 1992; 17:30	Ferretti 4	Goals	six players 1	Piscina Municipal de Montjuïc; Referees: Miroslav Radenović (YUG), Masaru Masaoka (JPN)

Classification round 9th-12th place

Pos	Team	Pld	W	D	L	GF	GA	GD	Pts
9	Netherlands	3	2	1	0	28	20	+8	5
10	Greece	3	2	1	0	24	18	+6	5
11	France	3	1	0	2	28	31	−3	2
12	Czechoslovakia	3	0	0	3	22	33	−11	0

8 August 1992; 9:30	Greece	10–6	France	Piscinas Bernat Picornell; Referees: Franco Picchetto (ITA), Lionel Liow (SGP)
8 August 1992; 9:30	Score by quarters: 2–0, 4–2, 1–2, 3–2			Piscinas Bernat Picornell; Referees: Franco Picchetto (ITA), Lionel Liow (SGP)
8 August 1992; 9:30	Seletopoulos 3	Goals	Ducher 3	Piscinas Bernat Picornell; Referees: Franco Picchetto (ITA), Lionel Liow (SGP)

9 August 1992; 9:00	Greece	10–8	Czechoslovakia	Piscinas Bernat Picornell; Referees: Bret Bernard (USA), David Bathurst (GBR)
9 August 1992; 9:00	Score by quarters: 2–2, 3–2, 2–3, 3–1			Piscinas Bernat Picornell; Referees: Bret Bernard (USA), David Bathurst (GBR)
9 August 1992; 9:00	Mavrotas 5	Goals	three players 2	Piscinas Bernat Picornell; Referees: Bret Bernard (USA), David Bathurst (GBR)

== Weightlifting ==
Athlete	Event	Snatch		Clean & jerk		Total	Rank
Athlete	Event	Result	Rank	Result	Rank	Total	Rank
Valerios Leonidis	60 kg	132.5	3	162.5	5	295.0	5
Panagiotis Grammatikopoulos	75 kg	130.0	27	172.5	23	302.5	25
Pyrros Dimas	82.5 kg	167.5	1	202.5	3	370.0	1st place, gold medalist(s)
Panagiotis Drakopoulos	100 kg	167.5	9	No lift		DNF	
Pavlos Saltsidis	110 kg	175.0	6	210.0	9	385.0	8

== Wrestling ==
Greco-Roman

Athlete	Event	Group Stage							Final	
Athlete	Event	Opposition Result	Opposition Result	Opposition Result	Opposition Result	Opposition Result	Opposition Result	Rank	Opposition Result	Rank
Isaak Theodoridis	57 kg	Sike (HUN); L 2–3	Lara (CUB); L 0–5	Did not advance				9	Did not advance	
Konstantinos Arkoudeas	62 kg	Vavrla (TCH); W 2–1	Grigorov (BUL); L 3–13	Marén (CUB); L Fall	Did not advance			5	Büttner (GER); W w/o	9
Petros Triantafyllidis	74 kg	Almanza (CUB); L 0–5	Riemer (FRA); L 0–8	Did not advance				9	Did not advance	
Leonidas Pappas	82 kg	Mischler (FRA); L 0–2	Kasum (IOA); L 0–3	Did not advance				8	Did not advance	
Iordanis Konstantinidis	90 kg	Yordanov (BUL); L 1–5	Meiss (FRA); W 6–1	Campanella (ITA); L 2–4	Did not advance			6	Did not advance	
Panagiotis Poikilidis	130 kg	Choromański (POL); W 2–0	Suzuki (JPN); W 2–0	Johansson (SWE); L 0–2	Klauz (HUN); L 1–2	—N/a		4	Ahokas (FIN); L 0–1	8

Freestyle

Athlete	Event	Group Stage						Final	
Athlete	Event	Opposition Result	Opposition Result	Opposition Result	Opposition Result	Opposition Result	Rank	Opposition Result	Rank
Georgios Moustopoulos	62 kg	Singh Dahiya (IND); W 6–4	Mohammadian (IRI); L 0–4	Müller (SUI); L injury	Did not advance		8	Did not advance	
Georgios Athanasiadis	68 kg	Go (KOR); W 4–2	Schwabenland (GER); L DQ	Akbarnejad (IRI); L 1–5	Did not advance		6	Did not advance	
Ioakeim Vasiliadis	74 kg	Bye	Park (KOR); L 0–4	Khadem (IRI); L 2–4	Did not advance		5	Zhelev (BUL); W w/o	9
Iraklis Deskoulidis	90 kg	Baev (BUL); W 8–2	Baninosrat (IRI); L 0–4	Sükhbat (MGL); L 0–2	Did not advance		5	Schneider (GER); W 3–0	9
Petros Bourdoulis	100 kg	Verma (IND); L 0–5	Balz (GER); L 0–4	Did not advance			9	Did not advance	
