= Wrestling at the 1996 Summer Olympics – Men's Greco-Roman 68 kg =

Sport event

Men's Greco-Roman 68 kg at the Games of the XXVI Olympiad
- Venue: Georgia World Congress Center
- Dates: 20–21 July 1996
- Competitors: 22 from 22 nations

Medalists
| 1st place, gold medalist(s) | | Ryszard Wolny | Poland |
| 2nd place, silver medalist(s) | | Ghani Yalouz | France |
| 3rd place, bronze medalist(s) | | Aleksandr Tretyakov | Russia |

The men's Greco-Roman 68 kilograms at the 1996 Summer Olympics as part of the wrestling program were held at the Georgia World Congress Center from July 20 to July 21. The gold and silver medalists were determined by the final match of the main single-elimination bracket. The losers advanced to the repechage. These matches determined the bronze medalist for the event.

== Results ==
=== Round 1 ===
| | Score | | CP |
1/16 finals
| Tarieli Melelashvili (GEO) | 2–4 | Liubal Colás (CUB) | 1–3 PP |
| Ender Memet (ROM) | 3–0 Fall | Valeri Nikitin (EST) | 4–0 TO |
| Yalçın Karapınar (TUR) | 3–0 | Samvel Manukyan (ARM) | 3–0 PO |
| Rodney Smith (USA) | 6–1 | José Escobar (COL) | 3–1 PP |
| Grigori Pulyaev (UZB) | 12–0 | Colin Daynes (CAN) | 4–0 ST |
| Anwar Kandafil (MAR) | 0–10 | Biser Georgiev (BUL) | 0–4 ST |
| Kamandar Madzhidov (BLR) | 3–1 | Kim Young-il (KOR) | 3–1 PP |
| Marko Yli-Hannuksela (FIN) | 6–2 | Rustam Adzhi (UKR) | 3–1 PP |
| Yasushi Miyake (JPN) | 4–2 | Anders Magnusson (SWE) | 3–1 PP |
| Aleksandr Tretyakov (RUS) | 0–8 | Ghani Yalouz (FRA) | 0–3 PO |
| Ryszard Wolny (POL) | 6–1 | Attila Repka (HUN) | 3–1 PP |

=== Round 2 ===
| | Score | | CP |
1/8 finals
| Liubal Colás (CUB) | 3–0 | Ender Memet (ROM) | 3–0 PO |
| Yalçın Karapınar (TUR) | 1–12 | Rodney Smith (USA) | 1–4 SP |
| Grigori Pulyaev (UZB) | 2–0 | Biser Georgiev (BUL) | 3–0 PO |
| Kamandar Madzhidov (BLR) | 5–0 | Marko Yli-Hannuksela (FIN) | 3–0 PO |
| Yasushi Miyake (JPN) | 0–10 | Ghani Yalouz (FRA) | 0–4 ST |
| Ryszard Wolny (POL) | | Bye | |
Repechage
| Tarieli Melelashvili (GEO) | 0–6 Fall | Valeri Nikitin (EST) | 0–4 TO |
| Samvel Manukyan (ARM) | 12–0 | José Escobar (COL) | 4–0 ST |
| Colin Daynes (CAN) | 5–4 | Anwar Kandafil (MAR) | 3–1 PP |
| Kim Young-il (KOR) | 1–2 | Rustam Adzhi (UKR) | 1–3 PP |
| Anders Magnusson (SWE) | 2–9 | Aleksandr Tretyakov (RUS) | 1–3 PP |
| Attila Repka (HUN) | | Bye | |

=== Round 3 ===
| | Score | | CP |
Quarterfinals
| Ryszard Wolny (POL) | 6–0 | Liubal Colás (CUB) | 3–0 PO |
| Rodney Smith (USA) | 0–4 | Grigori Pulyaev (UZB) | 0–3 PO |
| Kamandar Madzhidov (BLR) | | Bye | |
| Ghani Yalouz (FRA) | | Bye | |
Repechage
| Attila Repka (HUN) | 0–2 Fall | Valeri Nikitin (EST) | 0–4 TO |
| Samvel Manukyan (ARM) | 9–3 | Colin Daynes (CAN) | 3–1 PP |
| Rustam Adzhi (UKR) | 1–3 | Aleksandr Tretyakov (RUS) | 1–3 PP |
| Ender Memet (ROM) | 4–9 | Yalçın Karapınar (TUR) | 1–3 PP |
| Biser Georgiev (BUL) | 1–1 | Marko Yli-Hannuksela (FIN) | 3–1 PP |
| Yasushi Miyake (JPN) | | Bye | |

=== Round 4 ===
| | Score | | CP |
Semifinals
| Ryszard Wolny (POL) | 3–0 | Grigori Pulyaev (UZB) | 3–0 PO |
| Kamandar Madzhidov (BLR) | 1–4 | Ghani Yalouz (FRA) | 1–3 PP |
Repechage
| Yasushi Miyake (JPN) | 0–6 | Valeri Nikitin (EST) | 0–3 PO |
| Samvel Manukyan (ARM) | 0–5 | Aleksandr Tretyakov (RUS) | 0–3 PO |
| Yalçın Karapınar (TUR) | 0–5 | Biser Georgiev (BUL) | 0–3 PO |
| Liubal Colás (CUB) | 3–2 | Rodney Smith (USA) | 3–1 PP |

=== Round 5 ===
| | Score | | CP |
Repechage
| Valeri Nikitin (EST) | 0–4 | Aleksandr Tretyakov (RUS) | 0–3 PO |
| Biser Georgiev (BUL) | 4–0 | Liubal Colás (CUB) | 3–0 PO |

=== Round 6 ===
| | Score | | CP |
Repechage
| Grigori Pulyaev (UZB) | 0–6 | Aleksandr Tretyakov (RUS) | 0–3 PO |
| Biser Georgiev (BUL) | 1–3 | Kamandar Madzhidov (BLR) | 1–3 PP |

=== Finals ===
| | Score | | CP |
Classification 7th–8th
| Valeri Nikitin (EST) | 1–6 | Liubal Colás (CUB) | 1–3 PP |
Classification 5th–6th
| Grigori Pulyaev (UZB) | 1–2 | Biser Georgiev (BUL) | 1–3 PP |
Bronze medal match
| Aleksandr Tretyakov (RUS) | 4–0 | Kamandar Madzhidov (BLR) | 3–0 PO |
Gold medal match
| Ryszard Wolny (POL) | 7–0 | Ghani Yalouz (FRA) | 3–0 PO |

== Final standing ==
| Rank | Athlete |
|---|---|
| 1st place, gold medalist(s) | Ryszard Wolny (POL) |
| 2nd place, silver medalist(s) | Ghani Yalouz (FRA) |
| 3rd place, bronze medalist(s) | Aleksandr Tretyakov (RUS) |
| 4 | Kamandar Madzhidov (BLR) |
| 5 | Biser Georgiev (BUL) |
| 6 | Grigori Pulyaev (UZB) |
| 7 | Liubal Colás (CUB) |
| 8 | Valeri Nikitin (EST) |
| 9 | Rodney Smith (USA) |
| 10 | Samvel Manukyan (ARM) |
| 11 | Yalçın Karapınar (TUR) |
| 12 | Ender Memet (ROM) |
| 13 | Rustam Adzhi (UKR) |
| 14 | Colin Daynes (CAN) |
| 15 | Marko Yli-Hannuksela (FIN) |
| 16 | Yasushi Miyake (JPN) |
| 17 | Anders Magnusson (SWE) |
| 18 | Kim Young-il (KOR) |
| 19 | Anwar Kandafil (MAR) |
| 20 | Tarieli Melelashvili (GEO) |
| 21 | José Escobar (COL) |
| 22 | Attila Repka (HUN) |
