= Wrestling at the 1992 Summer Olympics – Men's Greco-Roman 62 kg =

Men's Greco-Roman 62 kg at the Games of the XXV Olympiad
- Venue: Institut Nacional d'Educació Física de Catalunya
- Dates: 28–30 July 1992
- Competitors: 21 from 21 nations

Medalists
1st place, gold medalist(s)		Mehmet Akif Pirim	Turkey
2nd place, silver medalist(s)		Sergey Martynov	Unified Team
3rd place, bronze medalist(s)		Juan Marén	Cuba

The men's Greco-Roman 57 kilograms at the 1992 Summer Olympics as part of the wrestling program were held at the Institut Nacional d'Educació Física de Catalunya from July 28 to July 30. The wrestlers were divided into 2 groups. The winner of each group was decided by a double-elimination system.

== Results ==
Legend

- WO — Won by walkover

=== Elimination A ===
==== Round 1 ====
	Score		CP
Buddy Lee (USA)	2–4	Hugo Dietsche (SUI)	1–3 PP
Mohan Ramchandra Patil (IND)	3–14	Ahad Pazaj (IRI)	1–3 PP
Alexander Davidovich (ISR)	1–8	Sergey Martynov (EUN)	1–3 PP
Shigeki Nishiguchi (JPN)	1–3	Włodzimierz Zawadzki (POL)	1–3 PP
Mario Büttner (GER)	8–7	Hu Guohong (CHN)	3–1 PP
Rachid Khdar (MAR)		Bye	

==== Round 2 ====
	Score		CP
Rachid Khdar (MAR)	0–17	Buddy Lee (USA)	0–4 ST
Hugo Dietsche (SUI)	5–0	Mohan Ramchandra Patil (IND)	3–0 PO
Alexander Davidovich (ISR)	0–2	Shigeki Nishiguchi (JPN)	0–3 PO
Sergey Martynov (EUN)	4–0	Mario Büttner (GER)	3–0 PO
Włodzimierz Zawadzki (POL)	4–0	Hu Guohong (CHN)	3–0 PO

- Ahad Pazaj (IRI) withdrew.

==== Round 3 ====
	Score		CP
Rachid Khdar (MAR)	1–10 Fall	Hugo Dietsche (SUI)	0–4 TO
Buddy Lee (USA)	5–4	Shigeki Nishiguchi (JPN)	3–1 PP
Sergey Martynov (EUN)	9–8	Włodzimierz Zawadzki (POL)	3–1 PP
Mario Büttner (GER)		Bye	

==== Round 4 ====
	Score		CP
Mario Büttner (GER)	WO	Buddy Lee (USA)	0–4 EF
Hugo Dietsche (SUI)	2–4	Sergey Martynov (EUN)	1–3 PP
Włodzimierz Zawadzki (POL)		Bye	

==== Round 5 ====
	Score		CP
Włodzimierz Zawadzki (POL)	7–0	Hugo Dietsche (SUI)	3–0 PO
Buddy Lee (USA)	3–7 Fall	Sergey Martynov (EUN)	0–4 TO

==== Summary ====
Pos	Athlete	Pld	W	L	R	CP	TP
1	Sergey Martynov (EUN)	5	5	0	X (Note: EUN 3–1 POL)	16	32
2	Włodzimierz Zawadzki (POL)	4	3	1	X	10	22
3	Buddy Lee (USA)	5	3	2	5	12	27
4	Hugo Dietsche (SUI)	5	3	2	5	11	21
5	Mario Büttner (GER)	3	1	2	4	3	8
—	Shigeki Nishiguchi (JPN)	3	1	2	3	5	7
—	Rachid Khdar (MAR)	2	0	2	3	0	1
—	Hu Guohong (CHN)	2	0	2	2	1	7
—	Mohan Ramchandra Patil (IND)	2	0	2	2	1	3
—	Alexander Davidovich (ISR)	2	0	2	2	1	1
—	Ahad Pazaj (IRI)	1	1	0	1	3	14

Source: Official Report

=== Elimination B ===
==== Round 1 ====
	Score		CP
Huh Byung-ho (KOR)	0–0	Luis Bernardo Martínez (ESP)	0–0 D2
Jenő Bódi (HUN)	6–0	Ahmed Ibrahim (EGY)	3–0 PO
Mehmet Akif Pirim (TUR)	3–2	Juan Marén (CUB)	3–1 PP
Usama Aziz (SWE)	0–3	Stanislav Grigorov (BUL)	0–3 PO
Jindřich Vavrla (TCH)	1–2	Konstantinos Arkoudeas (GRE)	1–3 PP

==== Round 2 ====
	Score		CP
Huh Byung-ho (KOR)	2–5	Jenő Bódi (HUN)	1–3 PP
Luis Bernardo Martínez (ESP)	4–1	Ahmed Ibrahim (EGY)	3–1 PP
Mehmet Akif Pirim (TUR)	5–0	Usama Aziz (SWE)	3–0 PO
Juan Marén (CUB)	3–2	Jindřich Vavrla (TCH)	3–1 PP
Stanislav Grigorov (BUL)	13–3	Konstantinos Arkoudeas (GRE)	3–1 PP

==== Round 3 ====
	Score		CP
Luis Bernardo Martínez (ESP)	4–6	Jenő Bódi (HUN)	1–3 PP
Mehmet Akif Pirim (TUR)	2–1	Stanislav Grigorov (BUL)	3–1 PP
Juan Marén (CUB)	5–0 Fall	Konstantinos Arkoudeas (GRE)	4–0 TO

==== Round 4 ====
	Score		CP
Jenő Bódi (HUN)	3–7	Mehmet Akif Pirim (TUR)	1–3 PP
Juan Marén (CUB)	5–1	Stanislav Grigorov (BUL)	3–1 PP
Luis Bernardo Martínez (ESP)	0–3	Konstantinos Arkoudeas (GRE)	0–3 PO

- Luis Bernardo Martínez (ESP) and Konstantinos Arkoudeas (GRE) were tied on classification points for fifth.

==== Round 5 ====
	Score		CP
Jenő Bódi (HUN)	1–5	Juan Marén (CUB)	1–3 PP
Mehmet Akif Pirim (TUR)		Bye	

==== Summary ====
Pos	Athlete	Pld	W	L	R	CP	TP
1	Mehmet Akif Pirim (TUR)	4	4	0	X (Note: Classification points: TUR 6, CUB 4, HUN 2)	12	17
2	Juan Marén (CUB)	5	4	1	X	14	20
3	Jenő Bódi (HUN)	5	3	2	X	11	21
4	Stanislav Grigorov (BUL)	4	2	2	4	8	18
5	Konstantinos Arkoudeas (GRE)	4	2	2	3	7	8
—	Luis Bernardo Martínez (ESP)	4	1	3	3	4	8
—	Jindřich Vavrla (TCH)	2	0	2	2	2	3
—	Huh Byung-ho (KOR)	2	0	2	2	1	2
—	Ahmed Ibrahim (EGY)	2	0	2	2	1	1
—	Usama Aziz (SWE)	2	0	2	2	0	0

Source: Official Report

=== Finals ===
	Score		CP
9th place match
Mario Büttner (GER)	WO	Konstantinos Arkoudeas (GRE)	
7th place match
Hugo Dietsche (SUI)	WO	Stanislav Grigorov (BUL)	0–4 EF
5th place match
Buddy Lee (USA)	WO	Jenő Bódi (HUN)	0–4 EF
Bronze medal match
Włodzimierz Zawadzki (POL)	0–5	Juan Marén (CUB)	0–3 PO
Gold medal match
Sergey Martynov (EUN)	2–13	Mehmet Akif Pirim (TUR)	1–3 PP

== Final standing ==
Rank	Athlete
1st place, gold medalist(s)	Mehmet Akif Pirim (TUR)
2nd place, silver medalist(s)	Sergey Martynov (EUN)
3rd place, bronze medalist(s)	Juan Marén (CUB)
4	Włodzimierz Zawadzki (POL)
5	Jenő Bódi (HUN)
6	Buddy Lee (USA)
7	Stanislav Grigorov (BUL)
8	Hugo Dietsche (SUI)
9	Konstantinos Arkoudeas (GRE)
10	Mario Büttner (GER)
