= Kim Young-il =

Kim Young-il may refer to:

- Kim Young-il (judge)
- Kim Young-il (basketball)
- Kim Young-il (wrestler)
