= Osanai =

Osanai (written: 小山内 or 長内) is a Japanese surname. Notable people with the surname include:

- Kaoru Osanai (小山内 薫, 1881–1928), Japanese theatre director, playwright and actor
- Mamo Osanai (小山内 護, born 1970), Japanese golfer
- Seiichi Osanai (長内 清一, born 1953), Japanese sport wrestler
- Takaya Osanai (小山内 貴哉, born 1993), Japanese footballer

== Fictional characters ==
- Kirihito Osanai (小山内 桐人) protagonist of the manga series Ode to Kirihito
- Shōko Osanai (小山内 梢子), protagonist of the visual novel Aoi Shiro
