= Aleksandr Tretyakov =

Aleksandr Tretyakov may refer to:

- Aleksandr Tretyakov (wrestler) (born 1972), Russian Olympic wrestler
- Aleksandr Tretyakov (skeleton racer) (born 1985), Russian Olympic skeleton racer
