= Kim Yeong-il =

Kim Yeong-il may refer to:

- Kim Yeong-il (basketball)
- Kim Yeong-il (wrestler)
