= Alexander Davidovich (wrestler) =

Israeli former Olympic wrestler

Alexander Davidovich אלכסנדר דוידוביץ
Personal information
- Born: August 11, 1967 (age 59) Kharkiv, Soviet Union
- Weight: Featherweight

Sport
- Style: Greco-Roman

Alexander Davidovich (Hebrew: אלכסנדר דוידוביץ; born August 11, 1967) is an Israeli former Olympic wrestler.

He was originally from Kharkiv, the Soviet Union, and emigrated to Israel in 1991.

== Wrestling career ==
Davidovich competed for Israel at the 1992 Summer Olympics in Barcelona, Spain, in wrestling at the age of 24. He wrestled in the Men's Featherweight, Greco-Roman competition, and lost to Sergey Martynov of Russia (who won the bronze medal) in Round One, coming in tied for 6th, and Shigeki Nishiguchi of Japan in Round Two, coming in tied for 7th.
