= Kim Weon-kee =

South Korean wrestler (1962–2017)

Medal record

Men's Greco-Roman wrestling

Representing South Korea

Olympic Games
Gold medal – first place	1984 Los Angeles	62 kg

Kim Weon-Kee (Korean: 김원기; Hanja: 金原基; January 6, 1962 – July 27, 2017) was a South Korean Greco-Roman wrestler and Olympic champion.

Kim was born in Hampyeong, South Jeolla Province, South Korea.

== Career ==
Kim received a gold medal at the 1984 Summer Olympics in Los Angeles. In the group round, he ended four of his five matches by fall or technical fall, including a win over reigning Olympic champion Stelios Mygiakis of Greece by technical fall.

In 1986, Kim retired from competitive wrestling for good after losing his spot for the 1986 Asian Games to future Olympic bronze medalist An Dae-Hyun in the national trial.

== Post career ==
Kim earned his master's degree in exercise physiology from Chonnam National University in 1987 and Ph.D. in physical education from Kyung Hee University in 2009.

== Death ==
Kim died from a heart attack on July 27, 2017 after a hiking trip at Chiaksan. He is survived by is wife.
