= M. R. Patil =

M. R. Patil may refer to:

- Mohan Ramchandra Patil, Indian wrestler
- M. R. Patil (politician)
