= Luis Bernardo Martínez =

Spanish wrestler

Personal information
- Nationality: Spanish
- Born: 31 January 1967 (age 59) Mieres, Spain

Sport
- Sport: Wrestling

Luis Bernardo Martínez (born 31 January 1967) is a Spanish wrestler. He competed in the men's Greco-Roman 62 kg at the 1992 Summer Olympics.
