= Bernd Gabriel =

German wrestler

Personal information
- Nationality: German
- Born: 5 August 1961 (age 64) Saarlouis, Germany

Sport
- Sport: Wrestling

Bernd Gabriel (born 5 August 1961) is a German wrestler. He competed in the men's Greco-Roman 62 kg at the 1984 Summer Olympics.
