= Buddy Lee (wrestler) =

American wrestler (born 1958)

Personal information
- Born: May 10, 1958 (age 68) Birmingham, Alabama, U.S.
- Home town: Richmond, Virginia, U.S.

Sport
- Country: United States
- Sport: Wrestling
- Events: Greco-Roman and Folkstyle
- College team: Old Dominion
- Club: U.S. Marine Corps
- Team: USA

Anthony "Buddy" Lee (born May 10, 1958) is an American wrestler. He competed in the men's Greco-Roman 62 kg at the 1992 Summer Olympics.

Lee attended Highland Springs High School in Richmond, Virginia. He was the first group AAA VHSL state champion at his high school, and attended Old Dominion University on a wrestling scholarship. While at Old Dominion, he was a two-time NCAA Division I wrestling All-American. In 2017, he was honored with the Outstanding American award by the Virginia Chapter of the National Wrestling Hall of Fame.
