= Carlos Fernández (wrestler) =

Spanish wrestler

Personal information
- Nationality: Spanish
- Born: 1 June 1965 (age 61)

Sport
- Sport: Wrestling

Carlos Fernández (born 1 June 1965) is a Spanish wrestler. He competed in the men's Greco-Roman 62 kg at the 1988 Summer Olympics.
