= Juha Lappalainen =

Finnish wrestler

Personal information
- Born: 3 February 1973 (age 53) Vantaa, Finland
- Height: 175 cm (5 ft 9 in)

Sport
- Country: Finland
- Sport: Greco-Roman wrestling Freestyle wrestling
- Weight class: 66–74 kg (146–163 lb)

Juha Lappalainen (born 3 February 1973) is a Finnish wrestler. He competed in the men's Greco-Roman 69 kg for Finland at the 2000 Summer Olympics.

Lappalainen represent Finland at the World Wrestling Championships in 1999 (freestyle 69 kg), 2001 (Greco-Roman 69 kg), and 2003 (Greco-Roman 66 kg).

He also competed at the European Wrestling Championships in 1998 (freestyle 69 kg), 1999 (freestyle 69 kg), 2000 (freestyle 69 kg), 2001 (Greco-Roman 69 kg), 2002 (Greco-Roman 66 kg), and 2006 (Greco-Roman 74 kg).
