= Habib Lakhal =

Tunisian wrestler

Personal information
- Nationality: Tunisian
- Born: 1 January 1961 (age 65)

Sport
- Sport: Wrestling

Habib Lakhal (born 1 January 1961) is a Tunisian wrestler. He competed in the men's Greco-Roman 62 kg at the 1988 Summer Olympics.
