= Jukka Loikas =

Finnish wrestler (born 1966)

Personal information
- Nationality: Finnish
- Born: 17 August 1966 (age 60) Helsinki, Finland

Sport
- Sport: Wrestling

Jukka Loikas (born 17 August 1966) is a Finnish wrestler. He competed in the men's Greco-Roman 62 kg at the 1988 Summer Olympics.
