= Zeki Şahin =

Turkish wrestler

Personal information
- Nationality: Turkish
- Born: 17 October 1965 (age 61)

Sport
- Sport: Wrestling

Zeki Şahin (born 17 October 1965) is a Turkish wrestler. He competed in the men's Greco-Roman 62 kg event at the 1988 Summer Olympics.
