= Mieczysław Tracz =

Polish wrestler (1962–2019)

Personal information
- Nationality: Polish
- Born: 15 November 1962 Żary, Poland
- Died: 2 September 2019 (aged 56)

Sport
- Sport: Wrestling

Mieczysław Tracz (15 November 1962 – 2 September 2019) was a Polish wrestler. He competed in the men's Greco-Roman 62 kg at the 1988 Summer Olympics.
