= Zhang Dequn =

Chinese wrestler

Personal information
- Full name: Chinese: 張 德群; pinyin: Zhāng Dé-qún
- Nationality: Chinese
- Born: 10 January 1963 (age 63)

Sport
- Sport: Wrestling

Zhang Dequn (born 10 January 1963) is a Chinese wrestler. He competed in the men's Greco-Roman 62 kg at the 1984 Summer Olympics.
