= Anders Magnusson =

Swedish wrestler

Personal information
- Nationality: Swedish
- Born: 18 December 1968 (age 57) Stockholm, Sweden

Sport
- Sport: Wrestling

Anders Magnusson (born 18 December 1968) is a Swedish wrestler. He competed in the men's Greco-Roman 68 kg at the 1996 Summer Olympics.
