= Kent-Olle Johansson =

Swedish wrestler (born 1960)

Personal information
- Full name: Kent-Olle Tommy Johansson
- Born: 18 November 1960 (age 65) Gärsnäs, Simrishamn, Skåne, Sweden
- Height: 164 cm (5 ft 5 in)
- Weight: 62 kg (137 lb)
Medal record
Men's Greco-Roman wrestling
Representing Sweden
Olympic Games
Silver medal – second place	1984 Los Angeles	Featherweight

Kent-Olle Tommy Johansson (born 18 November 1960) is a Swedish wrestler. He was born in Gärsnäs. He won an Olympic silver medal in Greco-Roman wrestling in 1984. He placed fifth at the 1985 World Wrestling Championships.
