= Zhivko Vangelov =

Bulgarian wrestler (born 1960)

Medal record

Men's Greco-Roman wrestling

Representing Bulgaria

Olympic Games
| Silver medal – second place | 1988 Seoul | 62 kg |

Zhivko Vangelov (Bulgarian: Живко Вангелов) (born 7 July 1960) is a Bulgarian former wrestler who competed in the 1988 Summer Olympics.
