= Ike Anderson =

American Greco-Roman wrestler (born 1957)

Personal information
- Born: December 22, 1957 (age 68) Columbia, South Carolina, U.S.

Sport
- Country: United States
- Sport: Wrestling
- Weight class: 62 kg
- Event: Greco-Roman
- College team: Appalachian State
- Team: USA
Medal record
Men's Greco-Roman wrestling
Representing the United States
World Cup
Silver medal – second place	1991 Thessalonik	62 kg
Bronze medal – third place	1988 Athens	62 kg
Pan American Games
Silver medal – second place	1991 Havana	62 kg
Pan American Championships
Silver medal – second place	1992 Albany	62 kg
Bronze medal – third place	1986 Colorado Springs	62 kg
Collegiate Wrestling
Representing the Appalachian State Mountaineers
SoCon Championships
Gold medal – first place	1979 Chattanooga	126 lb

Isaac "Ike" Anderson (born December 22, 1957) is an American former Greco-Roman wrestler who competed at the 1988 Summer Olympics at 62 kg. He was also a former Greco-Roman developmental coach for USA Wrestling. In 2024, he was honored with the Lifetime Service to Wresting Award for the South Carolina Chapter of the National Wrestling Hall of Fame.

== High school ==
Anderson attended Lower Richland High School in Hopkins, South Carolina. As a high school wrestler, he was a South Carolina state champion in 1975.

== College ==
He attend Appalachian State University in Boone, North Carolina, where he was a Southern Conference wrestling champion and qualified for the NCAA wrestling championships. He earned degrees in recreation and physical education. Anderson also wrestled for Broward Community College in Fort Lauderdale, Florida. In 1990, he was inducted into the Appalachian State Athletics Hall of Fame.

== Senior level ==
Anderson represented the United States at the 1988 Summer Olympics in Seoul, South Korea as a Greco-Roman wrestler at 62 kg, where he finished 6th. He won three U.S. National titles in Greco-Roman wrestling, was a national runner-up four times, and took silver at 62 kg at the 1991 Pan American Games in Havana, Cuba. He also earned medals at the Wrestling World Cup and the Pan American Wrestling Championships.
