= Ahmed Ibrahim (wrestler) =

Egyptian wrestler

Personal information
- Nationality: Egyptian
- Born: 8 April 1971 (age 55)

Sport
- Sport: Wrestling

Ahmed Ibrahim (born 8 April 1971) is an Egyptian wrestler. He competed in the men's Greco-Roman 62 kg at the 1992 Summer Olympics.
