= Rachid Khdar =

Moroccan wrestler

Personal information
- Nationality: Moroccan
- Born: 16 August 1967 (age 58)

Sport
- Sport: Wrestling

Rachid Khdar (born 16 August 1967) is a Moroccan wrestler. He competed in the men's Greco-Roman 62 kg at the 1992 Summer Olympics.
