= Yalçın Karapınar =

Turkish wrestler

Personal information
- Nationality: Turkish
- Born: 5 March 1967 (age 59)

Sport
- Sport: Wrestling

Yalçın Karapınar (born 5 March 1967) is a Turkish wrestler. He competed in the men's Greco-Roman 68 kg at the 1996 Summer Olympics.
