= Anwar Kandafil =

Moroccan wrestler

Personal information
- Nationality: Moroccan
- Born: 3 June 1973 (age 53)

Sport
- Sport: Wrestling

Anwar Kandafil (born 3 June 1973) is a Moroccan wrestler. He competed in the men's Greco-Roman 68 kg at the 1996 Summer Olympics.
