= Salem Bekhit =

Egyptian wrestler

Personal information
- Nationality: Egyptian
- Born: 8 March 1963 (age 63)

Sport
- Sport: Wrestling

Salem Bekhit (born 8 March 1963) is an Egyptian wrestler. He competed in the men's Greco-Roman 62 kg at the 1984 Summer Olympics.
