= Peter Behl =

German wrestler

Personal information
- Nationality: German
- Born: 12 February 1966 (age 60) Mömbris, Germany

Sport
- Sport: Wrestling

Peter Behl (born 12 February 1966) is a German former wrestler. He competed in the men's Greco-Roman 62 kg at the 1988 Summer Olympics.
