= Constantin Uță =

Romanian wrestler

Personal information
- Nationality: Romanian
- Born: 10 May 1962 (age 64) Câmpulung, Romania

Sport
- Sport: Wrestling

Constantin Uță (born 10 May 1962) is a Romanian wrestler. He competed in the men's Greco-Roman 62 kg at the 1984 Summer Olympics.
