= Yasushi Miyake =

Japanese wrestler

Personal information
- Nationality: Japanese
- Born: 26 February 1974 (age 52) Tokyo, Japan

Sport
- Sport: Wrestling

Yasushi Miyake (born 26 February 1974) is a Japanese wrestler. He competed in the men's Greco-Roman 68 kg at the 1996 Summer Olympics.
