= Samvel Manukyan =

Armenian Greco-Roman wrestler

Personal information
- Born: 12 October 1974 (age 51) Leninakan, Armenian SSR, Soviet Union
- Height: 1.70 m (5 ft 7 in)
- Weight: 74 kg (163 lb)

Sport
- Sport: Wrestling
- Event: Greco-Roman
- Club: Spårvägen Stockholm
- Coached by: Richard Swierad

Samvel Manukyan (Armenian: Սամվէլ Մանուկյան, born 12 October 1974) is an Armenian Greco-Roman wrestler. He competed at the 1996 Summer Olympics in the men's 68 kg division, coming in 10th place. Samvel is the younger brother of wrestler Michael Manukyan and Aghasi Manukyan.
