= Jindřich Vavrla =

Czech wrestler

Personal information
- Nationality: Czech
- Born: 12 February 1967 (age 59) Ostrava, Czechoslovakia

Sport
- Sport: Wrestling

Jindřich Vavrla (born 12 February 1967) is a Czech wrestler. He competed in the men's Greco-Roman 62 kg at the 1992 Summer Olympics.
