= Stanislav Grigorov =

Bulgarian wrestler

Personal information
- Nationality: Bulgarian
- Born: 24 June 1968 (age 58)

Sport
- Sport: Wrestling

Stanislav Grigorov (born 24 June 1968) is a Bulgarian wrestler. He competed in the men's Greco-Roman 62 kg at the 1992 Summer Olympics.
