= Alaattin Özgür =

Turkish wrestler (born 1965)

Alaattin Özgür (born 22 January 1965) is a Turkish former wrestler who competed in the 1984 Summer Olympics.
