= Aleksey Glushkov =

Russian Greco-Roman wrestler

Medal record

Men's Greco-Roman wrestling

Representing Russia

Olympic Games
Bronze medal – third place	2000 Sydney	69 kg

Aleksei Yuryevich Glushkov (Russian: Алексей Юрьевич Глушков, born March 9, 1975) is a Russian wrestler and Olympic bronze medalist in Greco-Roman wrestling.
