= Hannu Lahtinen =

Finnish wrestler (1960–2020)

Personal information
- Nationality: Finnish
- Born: Hannu Antero Lahtinen; September 20, 1960 Jalasjärvi, Finland
- Died: November 20, 2020 (aged 60)

Sport
- Sport: Wrestling
- Event: Greco-Roman

Achievements and titles
- Olympic finals: 1984 Summer Olympics

Hannu Antero Lahtinen (20 September 1960 – 20 November 2020) was a Finnish Greco-Roman style wrestler and a world champion, who competed in the 1984 Summer Olympics. Lahtinen was born in Jalasjärvi, and died in 2020 from amyotrophic lateral sclerosis.
