= Colin Daynes =

Canadian Greco-Roman wrestler

Personal information
- Born: May 8, 1974 (age 52) Windsor, Ontario, Canada
- Height: 1.73 m (5 ft 8 in)
- Weight: 68 kg (150 lb)

Sport
- Sport: Wrestling
- Updated on 6 August 2012

Colin Daynes (born May 8, 1974) is a Canadian Greco-Roman wrestler who represented Canada at the 1996 Summer Olympics.
