= An Dae-hyun =

South Korean wrestler (born 1962)

- Hangul: 안대현
- Hanja: 安大鉉
- RR: An Daehyeon
- MR: An Taehyŏn

An Dae-hyun
Medal record

Men's Greco-Roman wrestling

Representing South Korea

Olympic Games
Bronze medal – third place	1988 Seoul	62 kg

An Dae-hyun (Korean: 안대현; Hanja: 安大鉉; born October 28, 1962, in Goesan, North Chungcheong Province) is a retired South Korean Greco-Roman wrestler.

He received a bronze medal at the 1988 Summer Olympics in Seoul. He won a silver medal in the Greco-Roman division at the 1993 Peer Gynt cup in Norway.
