= Dimitrios Seletopoulos =

Greek water polo player

Personal information
- Born: May 28, 1963 (age 61)

Sport
- Sport: Water polo

Dimitrios Seletopoulos (born 28 May 1963) is a Greek former water polo player who competed in the 1984 Los Angeles Summer Olympics, in the 1988 Seoul Summer Olympics, and in the 1992 Barcelona Summer Olympics.
