= Abdurrahim Kuzu =

Turkish and American former wrestler (born 1955)

Personal information
- Nationality: Turkey; United States
- Born: September 20, 1955 (age 70) İzmit, Turkey

Sport
- Country: United States
- Sport: Wrestling
- Event: Greco-Roman
- Club: Sunkist Kids Wrestling Club
- Team: USA
Medal record
Men's Greco-Roman wrestling
Representing the United States
World Championships
Silver medal – second place	1979 San Diego	62 kg

Abdurrahim Kuzu (born September 20, 1955 in İzmit) is a Turkish and American former Greco-Roman wrestler, who competed in the 1984 Summer Olympics. Kuzu won a silver medal in Greco-Roman wrestling at the 1979 World Wrestling Championships. He emigrated to the United States in the late 1970s. Kuzu competed for the University of Nebraska Omaha in college.
