= José Escobar (wrestler) =

Colombian wrestler (born 1975)

Personal information
- Nationality: Colombian
- Born: 10 October 1975 (age 50) Cali, Colombia

Sport
- Sport: Wrestling
Medal record
Representing Colombia
Pan American Games
Silver medal – second place	2003 Santo Domingo	-74kg Greco-Roman

José Uber Escobar (born 10 October 1975) is a Colombian wrestler. He competed in the men's Greco-Roman 68 kg at the 1996 Summer Olympics.
