= Kamandar Madzhidov =

Belarusian wrestler (born 1961)

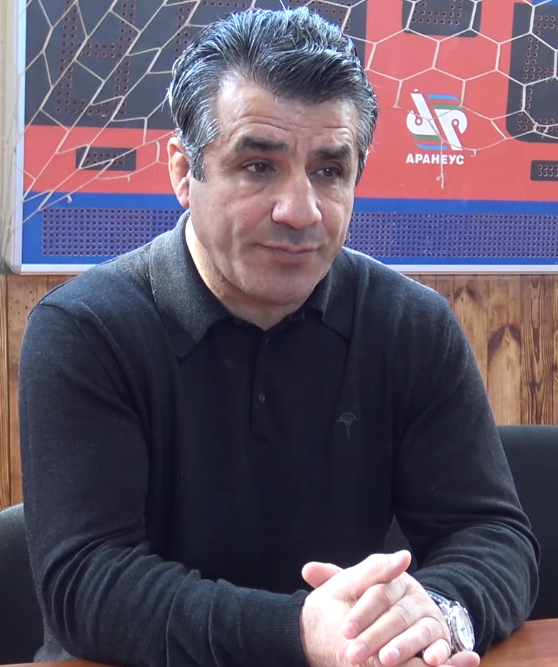

Medal record

Men's Greco-Roman wrestling

Representing Soviet Union

Olympic Games
Gold medal – first place	1988 Seoul	62 kg

World Championships
Gold medal – first place	1986 Budapest	62 kg
Silver medal – second place	1987 Clermont-Ferrand	62 kg
Gold medal – first place	1989 Martigny	68 kg

European Championships
Gold medal – first place	1984 Jönköping	62 kg
Gold medal – first place	1985 Leipzig	62 kg
Gold medal – first place	1991 Aschaffenburg	68 kg

World Cup
Gold medal – first place	1990 Gothenburg	68 kg

Representing Belarus

World Championships
Silver medal – second place	1993 Stockholm	68 kg

European Championships
Bronze medal – third place	1993 Istanbul	68 kg

Kamandar Bafali oglu Madzhidov (Azerbaijani: Kamandar Bafəli oğlu Məcidov; born 7 May 1961, Dmanisi, Georgian SSR) is a Belarusian wrestler with Azerbaijani origin, Olympic Champion, World Champion and European Champion.

He competed for the Soviet Union at the 1988 Summer Olympics in Seoul where he won a gold medal in Greco-Roman wrestling, the featherweight class. At the 1996 Summer Olympics in Atlanta he placed fourth in the lightweight class, now competing for Belarus.
