= Ruslan Biktyakov =

Uzbekistani wrestler (born 1974)

Personal information
- Nationality: Uzbekistani
- Born: 16 February 1974 (age 52)

Sport
- Sport: Wrestling

Ruslan Biktyakov (born 16 February 1974) is an Uzbekistani wrestler. He competed in the men's Greco-Roman 69 kg at the 2000 Summer Olympics. He was affiliated with Spartak Tashkent.
