= Herbert Nigsch =

Austrian wrestler

Personal information
- Nationality: Austrian
- Born: 2 December 1960 (age 64); Feldkirch, Austria

Sport
- Sport: Wrestling

Herbert Nigsch (born 2 December 1960) is an Austrian wrestler. He competed at the 1980 Summer Olympics and the 1984 Summer Olympics.
