= Mario Büttner =

German wrestler

Personal information
- Nationality: German
- Born: 23 November 1967 (age 58) Luckenwalde, East Germany

Sport
- Sport: Wrestling

Mario Büttner (born 23 November 1967) is a German wrestler. He competed in the men's Greco-Roman 62 kg at the 1992 Summer Olympics.
