= Kim Young-il (judge) =

South Korean judge (1940–2024)

- 김영일

Justice of the Constitutional Court of Korea
- In office 30 December 1999 – 13 March 2005
- Appointed by: Kim Dae-jung
- Preceded by: Lee Jae-hwa
- Succeeded by: Lee Kong-hyun

Personal details
- Born: 13 March 1940 Keijō, Japanese Korea
- Died: 21 February 2024 (aged 83) Seoul, South Korea
- Education: Seoul National University (LL. B)
- Occupation: Judge; lawyer

Kim Young-il (Korean: 김영일; 13 March 1940 – 21 February 2024) was a South Korean lawyer and judge.

== Career ==
He served as a Justice of the Constitutional Court of Korea from 1999 to 2005.

Kim died in Seoul on 21 February 2024, at the age of 83.
