= Dimitrios Bitsakos =

Greek water polo player

Personal information
- Born: May 23, 1973 (age 51); Patras, Greece

Sport
- Sport: Water polo

Dimitrios Bitsakos (born 23 May 1972) is a Greek former water polo player who competed in the 1992 Summer Olympics.
