= Seiichi Osanai =

Japanese wrestler (born 1953)

Personal information
- Nationality: Japanese
- Born: 20 December 1953 (age 72)

Sport
- Sport: Wrestling

Seiichi Osanai (長内 清一, Osanai Seiichi; born 20 December 1953) is a Japanese wrestler. He competed in the men's Greco-Roman 62 kg at the 1984 Summer Olympics.
