= Roberto Aceves =

Mexican wrestler

Personal information
- Nationality: Mexican
- Born: 7 April 1962 (age 62)
- Height: 1.65 m (5 ft 5 in)
- Weight: 64 kg (141 lb)

Sport
- Sport: Wrestling

Roberto Aceves Villagrán (born 7 April 1962) is a Mexican wrestler. He competed in the 1984 Summer Olympics.
