= Doug Yeats =

Canadian wrestler (born 1957)

Personal information
- Full name: Douglas Yeats
- Born: 1 November 1957 (age 68) Montreal, Quebec, Canada
- Height: 168 cm (5 ft 6 in)

Sport
- Sport: Wrestling
Medal record
Men's Greco-Roman wrestling
Representing Canada
Pan American Games
Gold medal – first place	1979 San Juan	62 kg

Douglas "Doug" Yeats (born 1 November 1957) is a Canadian former wrestler who competed in the 1976 Summer Olympics, in the 1984 Summer Olympics, in the 1988 Summer Olympics, and in the 1992 Summer Olympics. He qualified for the Olympics in 1980; however, Canada boycotted. Yeats was born in Montreal, Quebec, Canada.

== Personal life ==
Yeats studied mechanical engineering at Concordia University, earning a Bachelor of Engineering in 1985. In 1989 he took over Westend Piano, his family's piano restoration, tuning and moving business, which was founded in 1948 and has been based in Montreal West since 2001. He was inducted into the Wrestling Canada Lutte Hall of Fame (formerly the Canadian Amateur Wrestling Hall of Fame) in 1999, the Concordia University Sports Hall of Fame in 2001 and the Quebec Sports Hall of Fame in 2004. He and Kati Yeats, a former member of Hungary's national gymnastics team, are the parents of four children: Ani, Dorothy, John and Peter.

Several of his children compete in sport:

- Dorothy Yeats, whom he coached, is a freestyle wrestler who won gold at the 2014 Commonwealth Games and the 2015 Pan American Games, was junior world champion in 2012 and 2013, and was named to Canada's team for the 2016 Summer Olympics.
- John Yeats is a Greco-Roman wrestler and a Canadian cadet champion. Coached by his father, he was named Outstanding Wrestler of the Greco-Roman competition at the 2019 Canadian Wrestling Trials.
- Aniko (Ani) Yeats is a masters diver with the Pointe-Claire Dive Club. She won bronze medals on 1 m springboard and platform in the women's 30–34 category at the 2025 World Aquatics Masters Championships in Singapore, and three gold medals (1 m, 3 m and platform) at the 2026 Pan American Aquatics Masters Championships in Buenos Aires. At the 2026 European Aquatics Masters Championships in Graz, she won silver medals on 3 m springboard and platform in the women's 30–34 category, and a bronze medal in women's synchronized platform.
