= Mohan Ramchandra Patil =

Indian wrestler

Personal information
- Nationality: Indian
- Born: 20 January 1968 (age 58)

Sport
- Sport: Wrestling

Mohan Ramchandra Patil (born 20 January 1968) is an Indian wrestler. He competed in the men's Greco-Roman 62 kg at the 1992 Summer Olympics.
