= Sergey Martynov (wrestler) =

Russian wrestler (1971–1997)

Medal record

Men's Greco-Roman wrestling

Representing the Unified Team

Olympic Games
Silver medal – second place	1992 Barcelona	62 kg

Sergey Martynov (born 30 April 1971) is a Russian wrestler who competed in the 1992 Summer Olympics and in the 1996 Summer Olympics.
