= Ghani Yalouz =

French wrestler (born 1967)

Medal record

Men's Greco-Roman wrestling

Representing France

Olympic Games
Silver medal – second place	1996 Atlanta	68 kg

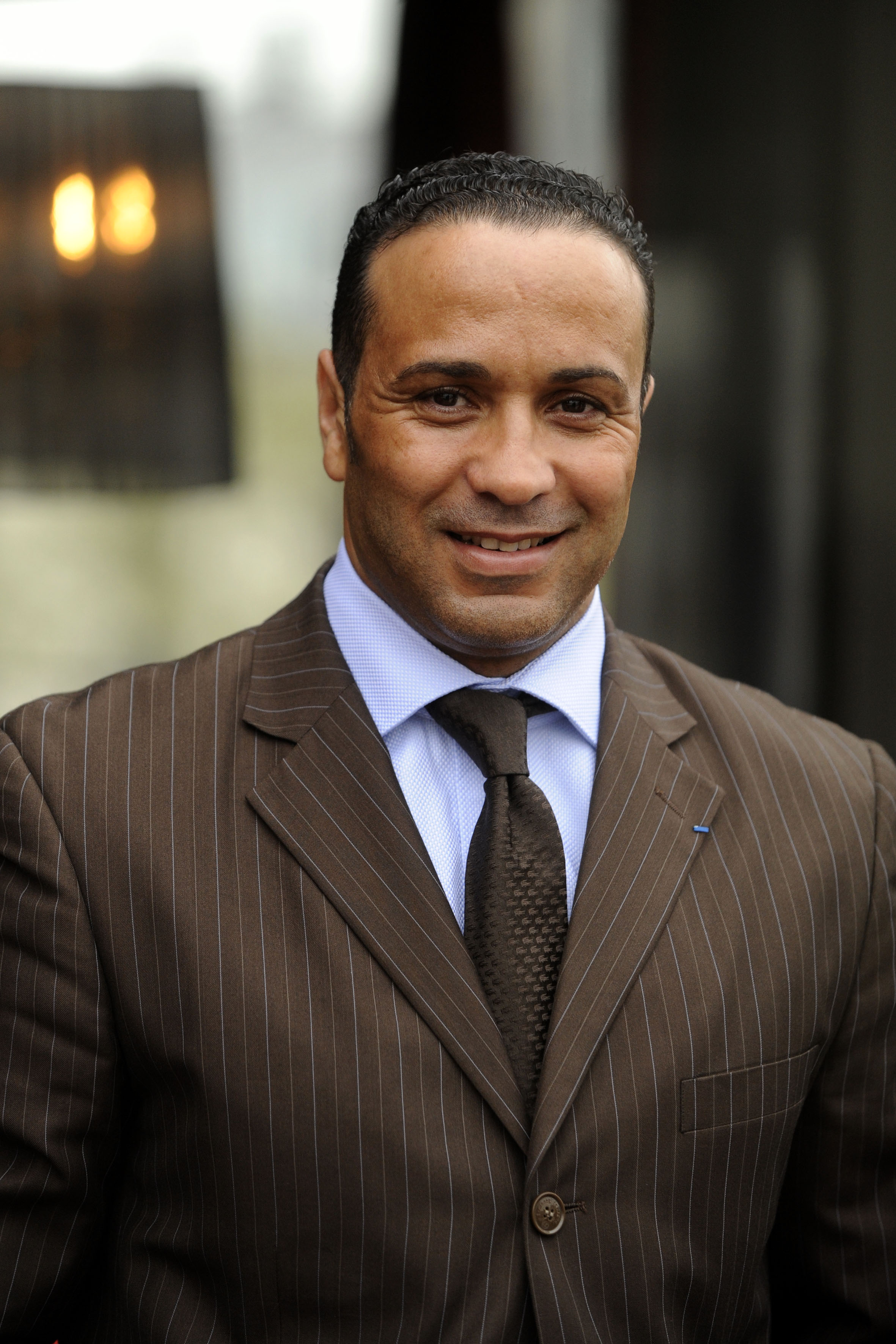

Ghani Yalouz (born 28 december 1967 in Casablanca, Morocco) is a French former wrestler who competed in the 1992 Summer Olympics, in the 1996 Summer Olympics, and in the 2000 Summer Olympics.

After his competitive career ended, Yalouz served as director of performance for the French Wrestling Federation and French Athletics Federation. In 2017, he was appointed director of the INSEP, of which he is an alumnus.

Yalouz grew up in Besançon, and the city's indoor sports hall was renamed in his honor in 2017.
