= Vladimir Kopytov =

Belarusian wrestler (born 1965)

Personal information
- Nationality: Belarusian
- Born: 25 September 1965 (age 60) Gomel, Belarus

Sport
- Sport: Wrestling
Medal record
Men's Greco-Roman wrestling
Representing Belarus
World Championships
Bronze medal – third place	1999 Athens	69 kg
European Championships
Silver medal – second place	1998 Minsk	-69 kg
Silver medal – second place	1996 Budapest	-74 kg
Bronze medal – third place	1995 Besancon	-74 kg
Silver medal – second place	1994 Athens	-74 kg

Vladimir Kopytov (born 25 September 1965) is a Belarusian former wrestler. He competed at the 1996 Summer Olympics and the 2000 Summer Olympics.
