= Kim Young-il (wrestler) =

South Korean wrestler (born 1970)

Personal information
- Nationality: South Korean
- Born: 25 May 1970 (age 56)

Sport
- Sport: Wrestling
Medal record
Asian Games
Gold medal – first place	1994 Hiroshima	68 kg

Kim Young-il (born 25 May 1970) is a South Korean wrestler. He competed in the men's Greco-Roman 68 kg at the 1996 Summer Olympics placing 18th. He had also previously won the gold medal at the 1994 Asian Games in Hiroshima.
