= Liubal Colás =

Cuban wrestler (born 1974)

Personal information
- Born: 9 January 1974 (age 52) Santiago de Cuba, Cuba

Sport
- Sport: Wrestling
Medal record
Representing Cuba
Pan American Games
Gold medal – first place	1995 Mar del Plata	-69kg Greco-Roman
Gold medal – first place	1999 Winnipeg	-69kg Greco-Roman

Liubal Colás Oris (born 9 January 1974) is a Cuban wrestler. He competed in the men's Greco-Roman 68 kg at the 1996 Summer Olympics.
