= Brahim Loksairi =

Moroccan wrestler

Personal information
- Nationality: Moroccan
- Born: 1958 (age 67–68)

Sport
- Sport: Wrestling

Brahim Loksairi (born 1958) is a Moroccan wrestler. He competed at the 1984 Summer Olympics and the 1988 Summer Olympics.
