= Jenő Bódi =

Hungarian wrestler

Personal information
- Nationality: Hungarian
- Born: 10 August 1963 (age 63) Nagykőrös, Hungary

Sport
- Sport: Wrestling

Jenő Bódi (born 10 August 1963) is a Hungarian wrestler. He competed at the 1988 Summer Olympics and the 1992 Summer Olympics.
