= Grigori Pulyaev =

Uzbekistani wrestler (born 1971)

Personal information
- Nationality: Uzbekistani
- Born: 18 July 1971 (age 55) Samarkand, Uzbek SSR, Soviet Union

Sport
- Sport: Wrestling

Grigori Valeryevich Pulyaev (Russian: Григорий Валерьевич Пуляев; born 18 July 1971) is an Uzbekistani wrestler. He competed in the men's Greco-Roman 68 kg at the 1996 Summer Olympics.
