= Mattias Schoberg =

Swedish wrestler

Personal information
- Nationality: Swedish
- Born: 16 June 1973 (age 53) Falkenberg, Sweden

Sport
- Sport: Wrestling

Mattias Schoberg (born 16 June 1973) is a Swedish wrestler. He competed in the men's Greco-Roman 69 kg at the 2000 Summer Olympics.
