= Gilles Jalabert =

French wrestler

Gilles Jalabert (born 27 September 1958) is a French former wrestler who competed in the 1984 Summer Olympics and in the 1988 Summer Olympics.
