= Shigeki Nishiguchi =

Japanese wrestler (born 1965)

Personal information
- Full name: 西口茂樹 Nishiguchi Shigeki
- Nationality: Japanese
- Born: 2 July 1965 (age 61) Wakayama, Japan

Sport
- Sport: Wrestling

Shigeki Nishiguchi (born 2 July 1965) is a Japanese wrestler. He competed at the 1988 Summer Olympics and the 1992 Summer Olympics.
