= Hugo Dietsche =

Swiss wrestler (born 1963)

Medal record

Men's Greco-Roman wrestling

Representing Switzerland

Olympic Games
Bronze medal – third place	1984 Los Angeles	featherweight

Hugo Dietsche (born 31 March 1963) is a Swiss former wrestler who competed in the 1984 Summer Olympics, in the 1988 Summer Olympics, and in the 1992 Summer Olympics. Apart from participating in the olympics, he has seen success at the European Championships: bronze medal in 1986 in Piraeus and silver medal in 1992 in Copenhagen.
