= Hu Guohong =

Chinese wrestler (born 1961)

Personal information
- Nationality: Chinese
- Born: 1 January 1961 (age 65)

Sport
- Sport: Wrestling

Hu Guohong (born 1 January 1961) is a Chinese wrestler. He competed at the 1988 Summer Olympics, the 1992 Summer Olympics, and the 1996 Summer Olympics.
