= Biser Georgiev (wrestler) =

Bulgarian wrestler

Personal information
- Nationality: Bulgarian
- Born: 24 July 1973 (age 52) Samokov, Bulgaria

Sport
- Sport: Wrestling
Medal record
Representing Bulgaria
Men's Greco-Roman wrestling
World Championships
Bronze medal – third place	1994 Tampere	68 kg
Espoir World Championships
Gold medal – first place	1993 Athens	68 kg
Junior World Championships
Silver medal – second place	1991 Barcelone	68 kg

Biser Georgiev (born 24 July 1973) is a Bulgarian wrestler. He competed in the men's Greco-Roman 68 kg at the 1996 Summer Olympics.
