= Csaba Hirbik =

Hungarian wrestler

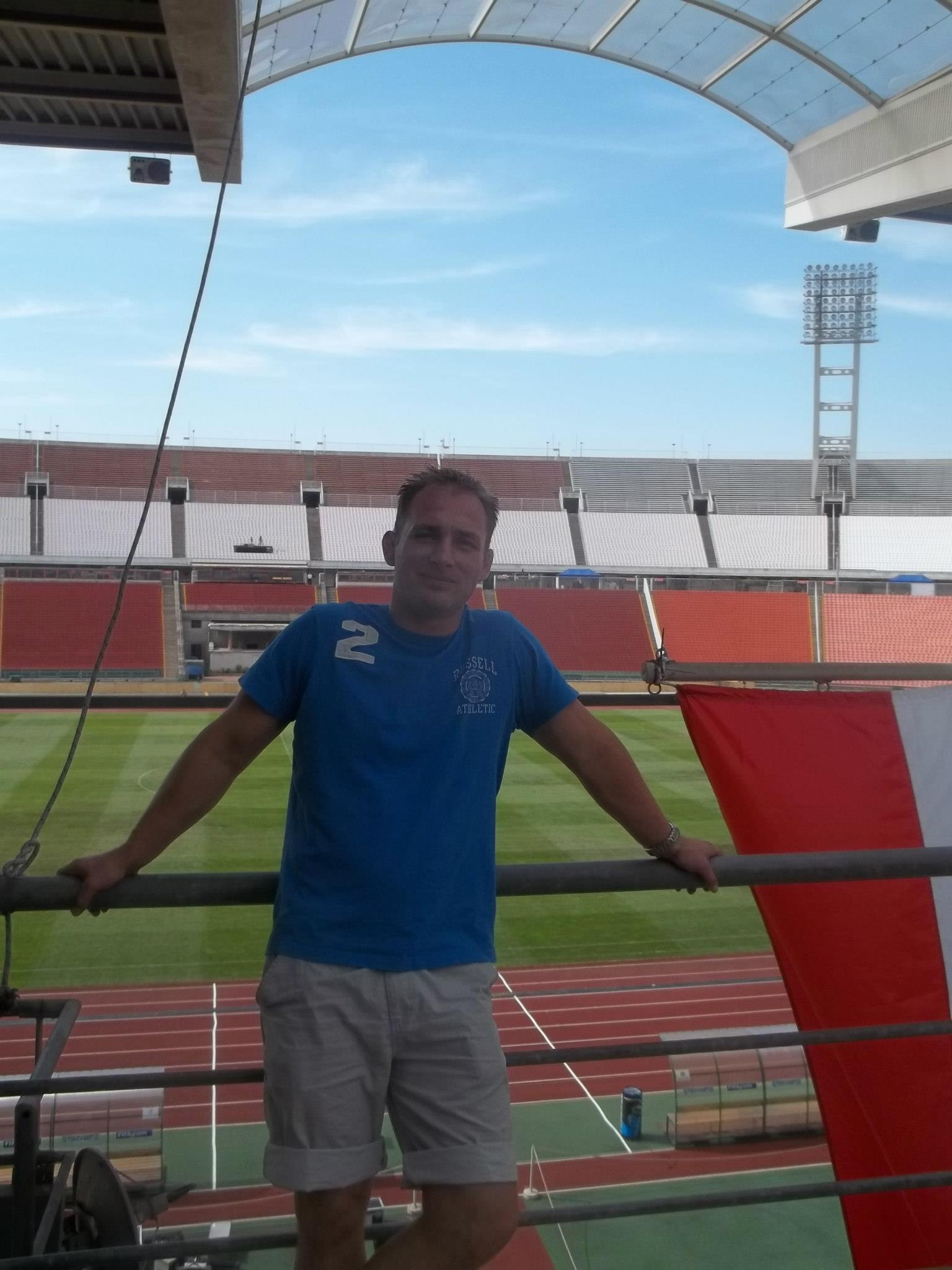

Personal information
- Nationality: Hungarian
- Born: 29 December 1976 (age 49) Budapest, Hungary

Sport
- Sport: Wrestling

Csaba Hirbik (born 29 December 1976) is a Hungarian wrestler. He competed in the men's Greco-Roman 69 kg at the 2000 Summer Olympics.
