= Adam Juretzko =

German wrestler

Personal information
- Nationality: German
- Born: 30 September 1971 (age 54) Tychy, Poland

Sport
- Sport: Wrestling

Adam Juretzko (born 30 September 1971) is a German wrestler. He competed in the men's Greco-Roman 69 kg at the 2000 Summer Olympics.
