= Aleksandr Tretyakov (wrestler) =

Russian wrestler (born 1972)

Medal record

Men's Greco-Roman wrestling

Representing Russia

Olympic Games
Bronze medal – third place	1996 Atlanta	68 kg

Aleksandr Vladimirovich Tretyakov (Russian: Александр Владимирович Третьяков; born 1 October 1972 in Perm, Soviet Union) is a Russian wrestler who won bronze medal at the 1996 Summer Olympics.
