= Valeri Nikitin (wrestler) =

Estonian wrestler (born 1969)

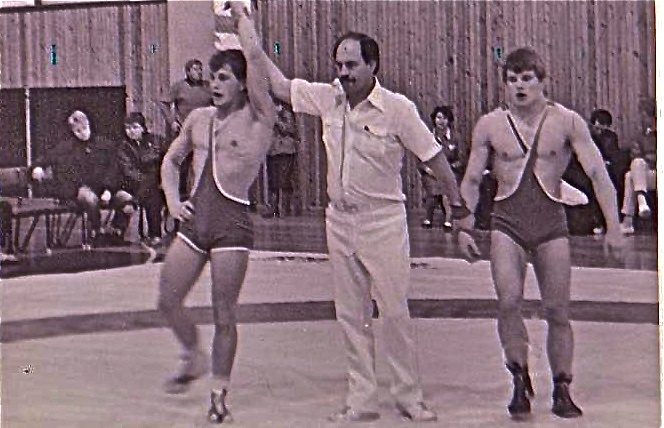
- Feliks Press vs Valeri Nikitin, at the 1989 Estonian Absolute Championships in Greco-Roman wrestling

Personal information
- Nationality: Estonia
- Born: 28 November 1969 (age 56) Haapsalu, then part of Estonian SSR, Soviet Union
- Height: 1.65 m (5 ft 5 in)
- Weight: 74 kg (163 lb)

Sport
- Country: Estonia
- Sport: Wrestling
- Event: Greco-Roman

Achievements and titles
- National finals: 10
- Highest world ranking: 4
Medal record
Men's Greco-Roman wrestling
Representing Estonia
European Championships
Bronze medal – third place	1992 Copenhagen	68 kg

Valeri Nikitin (born 28 November 1969) is an Estonian former wrestler who competed in the 1992 Summer Olympics, 1996 Summer Olympics and in the 2000 Summer Olympics.
