= Ryszard Wolny =

Polish wrestler (born 1969)

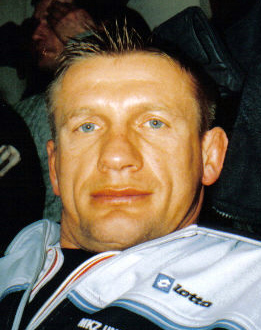

Medal record

Men's Greco-Roman wrestling

Representing Poland

Olympic Games
Gold medal – first place	1996 Atlanta	68 kg

World Championships
Bronze medal – third place	Ostia 1990	62 kg

European Championships
Gold medal – first place	1989 Oulu	60 kg
Silver medal – second place	1995 Besançon	60 kg
Silver medal – second place	1999 Sofia	60 kg
Bronze medal – third place	1990 Poznań	60 kg

Ryszard Marcin Wolny (born 24 March 1969 in Racibórz) is a Polish wrestler and Olympic champion in Greco-Roman wrestling.

== Olympics ==
Wolny has competed in five Olympics, from 1988 to 2004. At the 1996 Summer Olympics in Atlanta where he received a gold medal in Greco-Roman wrestling, the lightweight class.
