= Katsuhiko Nagata =

Japanese wrestler and MMA fighter

Katsuhiko Nagata 尾形克彦
- Born: October 31, 1973 (age 52)
- Nationality: Japanese
- Height: 5 ft 7 in (1.70 m)
- Weight: 154 lb (70 kg; 11.0 st)
- Division: Lightweight
- Reach: 170.18 cm (67 in) (5.583 ft)
- Style: Greco-Roman wrestling
- Stance: Southpaw
- Fighting out of: Chofu, Tokyo, Japan
- Team: Wrestle Win
- Years active: 7

Mixed martial arts record
- Total: 16
- Wins: 6
- By knockout: 1
- By decision: 5
- Losses: 7
- By knockout: 3
- By submission: 2
- By decision: 2
- Draws: 3

Other information
- Mixed martial arts record from Sherdog

Katsuhiko Nagata (Japanese: 尾形克彦, Nagata Katsuhiko; born on October 31, 1973, in Tōgane, Chiba, Japan) is a Japanese wrestler and mixed martial arts, who won the silver medal in the 69 kg Greco-Roman wrestling event at the 2000 Summer Olympics.

He is also the brother of professional wrestler Yuji Nagata, who works for New Japan Pro-Wrestling (NJPW).

== Awards ==
- Tokyo Sports
  - Wrestling Special Award (2000)

== Mixed martial arts record ==
Professional record breakdown
16 matches	6 wins	7 losses
By knockout	1	3
By submission	0	2
By decision	5	2
Draws	3	

Res.	Record	Opponent	Method	Event	Date	Round	Time	Location	Notes
Draw	6–7–3	Koji Oishi	Draw (unanimous)	Pancrase: Impressive Tour 13	December 3, 2011	3	5:00	Tokyo, Japan	
Draw	6–7–2	Koji Oishi	Draw (decision)	Pancrase: Passion Tour 11	December 5, 2010	2	5:00	Tokyo, Japan	
Loss	6–7–1	Katsuya Inoue	Decision (unanimous)	GCM - Cage Force 17	June 19, 2010	3	5:00	Tokyo, Japan	
Win	6–6–1	Koji Anjo	Decision (majority)	GCM - Cage Force 15	February 11, 2010	3	5:00	Tokyo, Japan	
Win	5–6–1	Daisuke Hoshino	Decision (unanimous)	GCM - Cage Force 13	October 24, 2009	3	5:00	Tokyo, Japan	
Loss	4–6–1	Kuniyoshi Hironaka	TKO (punches)	GCM - Cage Force 11	June 27, 2009	1	3:41	Tokyo, Japan	
Loss	4–5–1	Vítor Ribeiro	TKO (cut)	DREAM 8	April 5, 2009	1	7:58	Nagoya, Japan	
Draw	4–4–1	Yasunori Kanehara	Draw	GCM - Cage Force EX	February 28, 2009	3	5:00	Tokorozawa, Japan	
Loss	4–4	Naoyuki Kotani	Submission (heel hook)	ZST - ZST.18: Sixth Anniversary	November 23, 2008	2	4:38	Tokyo, Japan	
Loss	4–3	Shinya Aoki	Submission (mounted gogoplata)	Dream 4: Middleweight Grand Prix 2008 Second Round	June 15, 2008	1	5:12	Yokohama, Japan	
Win	4–2	Artur Oumakhanov	Decision (unanimous)	Dream 1: Lightweight Grand Prix 2008 First Round	March 15, 2008	2	5:00	Saitama, Japan	
Loss	3–2	Caol Uno	Decision (unanimous)	Hero's 9	July 16, 2007	3	5:00	Yokohama, Japan	Hero's 2007 Lightweight Grand Prix quarter-final.
Win	3–1	Isaiah Hill	Decision (split)	Dynamite!! USA	June 2, 2007	3	5:00	Los Angeles, California, United States	
Win	2–1	Shuichiro Katsumura	TKO (punches)	K-1 - Premium 2006 Dynamite!!	December 31, 2006	1	4:12	Osaka, Japan	
Loss	1–1	Yoshihiro Akiyama	KO (spinning back kick)	Hero's 5	May 3, 2006	2	2:25	Tokyo, Japan	
Win	1–0	Remigijus Morkevicius	Decision (unanimous)	K-1 - Premium 2005 Dynamite!!	December 31, 2005	2	5:00	Osaka, Japan	
