= Son Sang-pil =

South Korean Greco-Roman wrestler

Medal record

Men's Greco-Roman wrestling

Representing South Korea

World Championships
Gold medal – first place	1997 Wrocław	69 kg
Gold medal – first place	1999 Athens	69 kg
Bronze medal – third place	1998 Gävle	69 kg

Asian Games
Gold medal – first place	1998 Bangkok	69 kg

Son Sang-Pil (Korean: 손상필; Hanja: 孫相弼; born September 1, 1973) is a retired South Korean Greco-Roman wrestler. Son was born in Seoul, South Korea.

Son claimed the gold medals in the Groco-Roman 69 kg class at the 1997 and 1999 World Championships.

At the 1998 Asian Games, Son won the gold medal in the Greco-Roman 69 kg class, defeating 1998 World 63 kg Champion Mkhitar Manukyan in the final match.

While competing in the Sydney 2000 Summer Olympics, many considered Son a gold medal favorite. However, he was eliminated in the quarterfinals, losing to eventual gold medalist Filiberto Azcuy of Cuba 9–2.
