= Ender Memet =

Romanian wrestler (born 1967)

Personal information
- Nationality: Romanian
- Born: 22 February 1967 (age 59) Constanța, Romania

Sport
- Sport: Wrestling

Ender Memet (born 22 February 1967) is a Romanian wrestler. He competed at the 1992 Summer Olympics, the 1996 Summer Olympics and the 2000 Summer Olympics.
