= Rustam Adzhi =

Ukrainian wrestler

Personal information
- Nationality: Ukraine
- Born: 3 March 1973 (age 53) Mariupol, Ukraine
- Height: 1.75 m (5 ft 9 in)
- Weight: 69 kg (152 lb)

Sport
- Sport: Wrestling

Rustam Adzhi (Ukrainian: Рустам Іванович Аджі; born 3 March 1973) is a Ukrainian wrestler. He competed in the 1996 and 2000 Summer Olympics. Honored Master of Sports of Ukraine, the first world champion in Greco-Roman wrestling of independent Ukraine, coach of the Jordan national team (2016).

Rustam Adzhi had the following finishes at major championships – 1995 World Championship: 68.0 kg. Greco-Roman (1st); 2001 World Championship: 69.0 kg. Greco-Roman (3rd); 1994 World Championship: 68.0 kg. Greco-Roman (8th); 1999 World Championship: 69.0 kg. Greco-Roman (8th); 1998 World Championship: 69.0 kg. Greco-Roman (16th); 1997 European Championship: 69.0 kg. Greco-Roman (3rd); 1994 European Championship: 68.0 kg. Greco-Roman (4th); 1998 European Championship: 69.0 kg. Greco-Roman (4th); 2002 European Championship: 74.0 kg. Greco-Roman (4th); 1996 European Championship: 68.0 kg. Greco-Roman (14th); 2001 European Championship: 76.0 kg. Greco-Roman (19th).
