= List of European Championships medalists in wrestling (freestyle) =

This is a List of European Championships medalists in men's freestyle wrestling.

== Light flyweight ==
48 kg: 1969-1996

Tournament	Gold	Silver	Bronze
1969 Sofia	(Soviet Union) Roman Dmitriyev	(Bulgaria) Ognyan Nikolov	(Turkey) Sefer Baygın
1970 East Berlin	(Soviet Union) Rafig Hajiyev	(East Germany) Jürgen Möbius	(Hungary) Attila Laták
1972 Katowice	(Turkey) Sefer Baygın	(East Germany) Jürgen Möbius	(Bulgaria) Ognyan Nikolov
1973 Losanna	(Bulgaria) Hasan Isaev	(Soviet Union) Rafig Hajiyev	(Poland) Tadeusz Kudelski
1974 Madrid	(Soviet Union) Vitali Tokchinakov	(Turkey) Mehmet Canbaz	(Poland) Tadeusz Kudelski
1975 Ludwigshafen	(Bulgaria) Hasan Isaev	(East Germany) Jürgen Möbius	(Soviet Union) Fyodor Baumbah
1976 Leningrad	(Soviet Union) Anatoli Beloglazov	(Hungary) Mihály Gyulai	(East Germany) Jürgen Möbius
1977 Bursa	(Bulgaria) Stoyan Stoyanov	(Soviet Union) Sergey Kornilayev	(Romania) Gheorghe Rașovan
1978 Sofia	(Bulgaria) Stoyan Stoyanov	(Romania) Gheorghe Rașovan	(Hungary) Mihály Gyulai
1979 Bucharest	(Soviet Union) Arshak Sanoyan	(Poland) Jan Falandys	(Romania) Aurel Rentea
1980 Prievidza	(Bulgaria) Rumen Yordanov	(Soviet Union) Arshak Sanoyan	(Poland) Władysław Olejnik
1981 Lodz	(Bulgaria) Ali Mehmedov	(Italy) Claudio Pollio	(Soviet Union) Roman Dmitriyev
1982 Varna	(Hungary) László Bíró	(Soviet Union) Vasili Gogolev	(Socialist Federal Republic of Yugoslavia) Šaban Trstena
1983 Budapest	(Bulgaria) Ali Mehmedov	(Hungary) László Bíró	(Poland) Jan Falandys
1984 Jönköping	(Soviet Union) Sergey Kornilayev	(Hungary) László Bíró	(Bulgaria) Adem Hasanov
1985 Leipzig	(Soviet Union) Vasili Gogolev	(Poland) Władysław Olejnik	(Romania) Alin Păcuraru
1986 Piraeus	(Soviet Union) Aleksandr Dorju	(West Germany) Reiner Heugabel	(Romania) Alin Păcuraru
1987 Veliko Tarnovo	(Bulgaria) Marian Nedkov	(Romania) Alin Păcuraru	(East Germany) Mario Willomeit
1988 Manchester	(Soviet Union) Vasili Gogolev	(Romania) Romica Rașovan	(Bulgaria) Marian Nedkov
1989 Ankara	(Soviet Union) Gnel Medzhlumyan	(Turkey) İlyas Şükrüoğlu	(West Germany) Reiner Heugabel
1990 Poznan	(Romania) Romica Rașovan	(Bulgaria) Marian Nedkov	(West Germany) Reiner Heugabel
1991 Stuttgart	(Germany) Reiner Heugabel	(Poland) Stanisław Szostecki	(Soviet Union) Vugar Orujov
1992 Kaposvár	(Romania) Romica Rașovan	(Commonwealth of Independent States) Vugar Orujov	(Germany) Reiner Heugabel
1993 İstanbul	(Bulgaria) Marian Nedkov	(Turkey) İlyas Şükrüoğlu	(Ukraine) Viktor Yefteni
1994 Rome	(Armenia) Armen Mkrtchyan	(Germany) Reiner Heugabel	(Ukraine) Viktor Yefteni
1995 Fribourg	(Russia) Vugar Orujov	(Hungary) László Óváry	(Ukraine) Viktor Yefteni
1996 Budapest	(Ukraine) Viktor Yefteni	(Armenia) Armen Mkrtchyan	(Russia) Vugar Orujov

== Flyweight ==
- 52 kg: 1946–1996
- 54 kg: 1997–2001

Tournament	Gold	Silver	Bronze
1946 Stokholm	(Finland) Lennart Viitala	(Sweden) Malte Håkansson	(France) Georges Labadie
1949 İstanbul	(Turkey) Ali Yücel	(Iran) Mansur Reisi	(Sweden) Bengt Johansson
1966 Karlsruhe	(Turkey) Mehmet Esenceli	(West Germany) Paul Neff	(Poland) Lesław Kropp
1967 İstanbul	(Turkey) Mehmet Esenceli	(Bulgaria) Bayu Baev	(East Germany) Jürgen Kalkowski
1968 Skopje	(Bulgaria) Bayu Baev	(West Germany) Paul Neff	(Turkey) Mehmet Esenceli
1969 Sofia	(Bulgaria) Bayu Baev	(Soviet Union) Aminula Nasrulayev	(Romania) Petre Ciarnău
1970 East Berlin	(Bulgaria) Bayu Baev	(Turkey) Ali Rıza Alan	(Romania) Petre Ciarnău
1972 Katowice	(Soviet Union) Arsen Alakhverdiyev	(Bulgaria) Bayu Baev	(Romania) Emil Butu
1973 Losanna	(Soviet Union) Arsen Alakhverdiyev	(Turkey) Ali Rıza Alan	(Hungary) Henrik Gál
1974 Madrid	(Bulgaria) Ognyan Nikolov	(Soviet Union) Telman Pashayev	(Poland) Władysław Stecyk
1975 Ludwigshafen	(Soviet Union) Arsen Alakhverdiyev	(Turkey) Ali Rıza Alan	(Poland) Władysław Stecyk
1976 Leningrad	(Hungary) Henrik Gál	(Soviet Union) Arsen Alakhverdiyev	(East Germany) Hartmut Reich
1977 Bursa	(East Germany) Hartmut Reich	(Soviet Union) Aleksandr Ivanov	(Poland) Władysław Stecyk
1978 Sofia	(Bulgaria) Nermedin Selimov	(Soviet Union) Telman Pashayev	(Poland) Władysław Stecyk
1979 Bucharest	(Soviet Union) Iragui Shugayev	(East Germany) Hartmut Reich	(Poland) Andrzej Kudelski
1980 Prievidza	(Bulgaria) Nermedin Selimov	(Soviet Union) Iragui Shugayev	(Poland) Władysław Stecyk
1981 Lodz	(East Germany) Hartmut Reich	(Hungary) Lajos Szabó	(Bulgaria) Valentin Yordanov
1982 Varna	(Bulgaria) Valentin Yordanov	(Hungary) Lajos Szabó	(Soviet Union) Osman Efendiyev
1983 Budapest	(Bulgaria) Valentin Yordanov	(Socialist Federal Republic of Yugoslavia) Šaban Trstena	(Poland) Władysław Stecyk
1984 Jönköping	(Socialist Federal Republic of Yugoslavia) Šaban Trstena	(Bulgaria) Valentin Yordanov	(Soviet Union) Rahim Navrusov
1985 Leipzig	(Bulgaria) Valentin Yordanov	(Socialist Federal Republic of Yugoslavia) Šaban Trstena	(Soviet Union) Aleksandr Kirkesner
1986 Piraeus	(Bulgaria) Valentin Yordanov	(Socialist Federal Republic of Yugoslavia) Šaban Trstena	(Soviet Union) Minatula Daibov
1987 Veliko Tarnovo	(Bulgaria) Valentin Yordanov	(Soviet Union) Vladimir Toguzov	(Turkey) Aslan Seyhanlı
1988 Manchester	(Bulgaria) Valentin Yordanov	(Soviet Union) Vladimir Toguzov	(Socialist Federal Republic of Yugoslavia) Šaban Trstena
1989 Ankara	(Bulgaria) Valentin Yordanov	(Soviet Union) Mijail Kushnir	(Turkey) Aslan Seyhanlı
1990 Poznan	(Socialist Federal Republic of Yugoslavia) Šaban Trstena	(Soviet Union) Vladimir Toguzov	(Bulgaria) Ivan Tsonov
1991 Stuttgart	(Soviet Union) Vladimir Toguzov	(Germany) Stanislaw Kaczmarek	(France) Thierry Bourdin
1992 Kaposvár	(Bulgaria) Ivan Tsonov	(Romania) Constantin Corduneanu	(Turkey) Ahmet Orel
1993 İstanbul	(Turkey) Ahmet Orel	(Russia) Sultan Davydov	(Ukraine) Mijail Kushnir
1994 Rome	(Azerbaijan) Namig Abdullayev	(Bulgaria) Ivan Tsonov	(Russia) Sergey Zambalov
1995 Fribourg	(Azerbaijan) Namig Abdullayev	(Turkey) Metin Topaktaş	(Bulgaria) Ivan Tsonov
1996 Budapest	(Ukraine) Vladimir Toguzov	(Bulgaria) Ivan Tsonov	(Azerbaijan) Namig Abdullayev
1997 Warsaw	(Ukraine) Oleksandr Zakharuk	(Azerbaijan) Namig Abdullayev	(Turkey) Mevlana Kulaç
1998 Bratislava	(Ukraine) Oleksandr Zakharuk	(Belarus) Herman Kantoyeu	(Greece) Amiran Kardanov
1999 Minsk	(Ukraine) Oleksandr Zakharuk	(Bulgaria) Ivan Tsonov	(Russia) Leonid Chuchunov
2000 Budapest	(Ukraine) Oleksandr Zakharuk	(Russia) Leonid Chuchunov	(Bulgaria) Ivan Djorev
2001 Budapest	(Hungary) Ghenadie Tulbea	(Greece) Amiran Kardanov	(Armenia) Armen Mkrtchyan

== Bantamweight ==
- 56 kg: 1929–1937
- 57 kg: 1946–1996
- 58 kg: 1997–2001
- 55 kg: 2002–2013
- 57 kg: 2014–

Tournament	Gold	Silver	Bronze
1929 Paris	(Belgium) Piet Mollin	(France) Berthaux	(Switzerland) R. Wyss
1930 Brüksel	(Belgium) Piet Mollin	(Hungary) Gyarmati	(Sweden) John Björesson
1931 Budapest	(Hungary) Ödön Zombori	(France) Piet Mollin	(Sweden) Bror Wingren
1933 Paris	(Hungary) Ödön Zombori	(Germany) Hermann Fischer	(United Kingdom) Joseph Reid
1934 Stokholm	(Hungary) Márton Lőrincz	(Germany) Hermann Fischer	(Sweden) Herman Tuvesson
1935 Brüksel	(Italy) Marcello Nizzola	(Hungary) Márton Lőrincz	(Germany) Jakob Brendel
1937 Münih	(Germany) Jakob Brendel	(Sweden) Herman Tuvesson	(Finland) Wiliam Mannula
1946 Stokholm	(Hungary) Lajos Bencze	(Turkey) Nasuh Akar	(Finland) Erkki Johansson
1949 İstanbul	(Turkey) Nasuh Akar	(Sweden) Kurt Pettersén	(Egypt) Saad Şehata
1966 Karlsruhe	(Soviet Union) Aydın İbrahimov	(Bulgaria) Yancho Patrikov	(Turkey) Hasan Sevinç
1967 İstanbul	(Turkey) Hasan Sevinç	(Bulgaria) Yancho Patrikov	(Romania) Niculae Cristea
1968 Skopje	(Soviet Union) Ali Aliyev	(Bulgaria) Ivan Shavov	(Poland) Zbigniew Żedzicki
1969 Sofia	(Bulgaria) Yancho Patrikov	(Soviet Union) Pavel Malian	(Turkey) Mehmet Esenceli
1970 East Berlin	(Bulgaria) Ivan Shavov	(Soviet Union) Pavel Malian	(Turkey) Hasan Kahraman
1972 Katowice	(Soviet Union) Ivan Kuleshov	(Bulgaria) Ivan Shavov	(Poland) Zbigniew Żedzicki
1973 Losanna	(Bulgaria) Kirkor Leonov	(Hungary) László Klinga	(Soviet Union) Rain Dobordzhekidze
1974 Madrid	(Bulgaria) Pano Shelev	(East Germany) Hans-Dieter Brüchert	(West Germany) Emil Müller
1975 Ludwigshafen	(Soviet Union) Vladimir Yumin	(Bulgaria) Miho Dukov	(Poland) Zbigniew Żedzicki
1976 Leningrad	(Soviet Union) Vladimir Yumin	(Hungary) László Klinga	(East Germany) Hans-Dieter Brüchert
1977 Bursa	(Soviet Union) Oleg Alexeyev	(Bulgaria) Mehmed Selmanov	(Turkey) Fevzi Gökdoğan
1978 Sofia	(Soviet Union) Buzai Ibraguimov	(Romania) Aurel Neagu	(Bulgaria) Ivan Tsochev
1979 Bucharest	(Soviet Union) Sergey Beloglazov	(Romania) Aurel Neagu	(Bulgaria) Ivan Tsochev
1980 Prievidza	(Soviet Union) Gurguen Bagdasarian	(Bulgaria) Ivan Tsochev	(Romania) Aurel Neagu
1981 Lodz	(Bulgaria) Stefan Ivanov	(East Germany) Bernd Bobrich	(Soviet Union) Andrey Yartsev
1982 Varna	(Soviet Union) Sergey Beloglazov	(Hungary) Imre Szalontai	(Bulgaria) Stefan Ivanov
1983 Budapest	(Bulgaria) Stefan Ivanov	(Soviet Union) Ruslan Karayev	(Czechoslovakia) Jozef Schwendtner
1984 Jönköping	(Soviet Union) Sergey Beloglazov	(United Kingdom) Brian Aspen	(Bulgaria) Georgi Kalchev
1985 Leipzig	(Bulgaria) Stefan Ivanov	(East Germany) Bernd Bobrich	(Soviet Union) Gurguen Bagdasarian
1986 Piraeus	(Bulgaria) Georgi Kalchev	(Soviet Union) Ruslan Karayev	(Poland) Zygmunt Kołodziej
1987 Veliko Tarnovo	(Soviet Union) Sergey Beloglazov	(Socialist Federal Republic of Yugoslavia) Zoran Šorov	(Bulgaria) Georgi Kalchev
1988 Manchester	(Soviet Union) Sergey Beloglazov	(Turkey) Ahmet Ak	(Bulgaria) Stefan Ivanov
1989 Ankara	(Turkey) Ahmet Ak	(Soviet Union) Kamaludin Abduldaikov	(West Germany) Jürgen Scheibe
1990 Poznan	(Bulgaria) Rumen Pavlov	(West Germany) Laszlo Miklosch	(Soviet Union) Ali Alisultanov
1991 Stuttgart	(Soviet Union) Bagavdin Umakhanov	(Turkey) Remzi Musaoğlu	(Socialist Federal Republic of Yugoslavia) Zoran Šorov
1992 Kaposvár	(Commonwealth of Independent States) Bagavdin Umakhanov	(Turkey) Remzi Musaoğlu	(Bulgaria) Rumen Pavlov
1993 İstanbul	(Turkey) Remzi Musaoğlu	(Belarus) Sergey Smal	(Russia) Abdulaziz Azizov
1994 Rome	(Armenia) Anushavan Sahakyan	(Russia) Bagavdin Umakhanov	(Ukraine) Aslanbek Fidarov
1995 Fribourg	(Ukraine) Aslanbek Fidarov	(Bulgaria) Serafim Barzakov	(Azerbaijan) Arif Abdullayev
1996 Budapest	(Bulgaria) Serafim Barzakov	(Turkey) Harun Doğan	(Azerbaijan) Arif Abdullayev
1997 Warsaw	(Georgia (country)) David Pogosyan	(Poland) Tadeusz Kowalski	(Russia) Murad Umakhanov
1998 Bratislava	(Georgia (country)) David Pogosian	(Russia) Murad Umakhanov	(Ukraine) Yevhen Buslovych
1999 Minsk	(Turkey) Harun Doğan	(Italy) Michele Liuzzi	(Georgia (country)) Otar Tushishvili
2000 Budapest	(Russia) Murad Ramazanov	(Turkey) Arif Kama	(Ukraine) Yevgeni Busloviç
2001 Budapest	(Hungary) Zsolt Bánkuti	(Ukraine) Vasyl Fedoryshyn	(Belarus) Aliaxandr Karnitski
2002 Bakü	(Azerbaijan) Nazim Alidjanov	(Moldova) Ghenadie Tulbea	(Russia) Alexandr Kontoyev
2003 Riga	(Azerbaijan) Namig Abdullayev	(Greece) Amiran Kardanov	(Russia) Mavlet Batirov
2004 Ankara	(Russia) Adam Batirov	(Armenia) Martin Berberyan	(Bulgaria) İvan Velkov
2005 Varna	(Moldova) Ghenadie Tulbea	(Bulgaria) Radoslav Velikov	(Georgia (country)) Besarion Gochashvili (Russia) Alexandr Kontoyev
2006 Moscow	(Ukraine) Oleksandr Zakharuk	(Azerbaijan) Namig Abdullayev	(Greece) Amiran Kardanov (Russia) Djamal Otarsultanov
2007 Sofia	(Russia) Besik Kudukhov	(Germany) Marcel Ewald	(Bulgaria) Radoslav Velikov (Turkey) Sezar Akgül
2008 Tampere	(Russia) Djamal Otarsultanov	(Belarus) Rizvan Gadzhiev	(Spain) Francisco Sánchez (Turkey) Sezar Akgül
2009 Vilnius	(Russia) Nariman Israpilov	(Georgia (country)) Besarion Gochashvili	(Belarus) Vladislav Andreev (Bulgaria) Radoslav Velikov
2010 Bakü	(Azerbaijan) Mahmud Muhammedov	(Bulgaria) Radoslav Velikov	(Germany) Marcel Ewald (Russia) Viktor Lebedev
2011 Dortmund	(Russia) Djamal Otarsultanov	(Georgia (country)) Vladimer Khinchegashvili	(Belarus) Uladzislau Andreyeu (Azerbaijan) Mahmud Muhammedov
2012 Belgrad	(Russia) Djamal Otarsultanov	(Georgia (country)) Besarion Gochashvili	(Turkey) Ahmet Peker (Bulgaria) Radoslav Velikov
2013 Tiflis	(Georgia (country)) Giorgi Edisherashvili	(Belarus) Uladzislau Andreyeu	(Turkey) Sezar Akgül (Azerbaijan) Yashar Aliyev
2014 Vantaa	(Georgia (country)) Vladimer Khinchegashvili	(Monaco) Ghenadie Tulbea	(Armenia) Garik Barseghyan (France) Zoheir El Ouarraqe
2015 Baku	(Russia) Viktor Lebedev	(Germany) Marcel Ewald	(Moldova) Alexandru Chirtoacă (Turkey) Sezar Akgül
2016 Riga	(Russia) Gadzhimurad Rashidov	(Ukraine) Andriy Yatsenko	(Romania) Andrei Dukov (Bulgaria) Georgi Vangelov
2017 Novi Sad	(Azerbaijan) Giorgi Edisherashvili	(Romania) Andrei Dukov	(Russia) Zaur Uguev (Turkey) Süleyman Atlı
2018 Kaspiysk	(Azerbaijan) Giorgi Edisherashvili	(Russia) Zaur Uguev	(Serbia) Stevan Mićić (Belarus) Uladzislau Andreyeu
2019 Bucharest	(Turkey) Süleyman Atlı	(Russia) Muslim Sadulaev	(Azerbaijan) Mahir Amiraslanov (North Macedonia) Vladimir Egorov
2020 Rome	(Russia) Azamat Tuskaev	(Turkey) Süleyman Atlı	(Germany) Horst Lehr (Serbia) Stevan Mićić
2021 Warsaw	(Turkey) Süleyman Atlı	(Russia) Nachyn Mongush	(Ukraine) Kamil Kerymov (Azerbaijan) Afgan Khashalov
2022 Budapest	(North Macedonia) Vladimir Egorov	(Azerbaijan) Aliabbas Rzazade	(Armenia) Manvel Khndzrtsyan (Georgia (country)) Beka Bujiashvili
2023 Zagreb	(Azerbaijan) Aliabbas Rzazade	(Turkey) Süleyman Atlı	(Germany) Horst Lehr (Bulgaria) Georgi Vangelov
2024 Bucharest	(Armenia) Arsen Harutyunyan	(Turkey) Muhammet Karavuş	(Azerbaijan) Islam Bazarganov (Georgia (country)) Roberti Dingashvili
2025 Bratislava	Nachyn Mongush; United World Wrestling	(Serbia) Azamat Tuskaev	Aryan Tsiutryn; United World Wrestling (Azerbaijan) Islam Bazarganov

== Featherweight ==
- 61 kg: 1929–1937
- 62 kg: 1946–1961
- 63 kg: 1962–1967
- 62 kg: 1969–1995
- 63 kg: 1997–2001
- 60 kg: 2002–2013
- 61 kg: 2014–

Tournament	Gold	Silver	Bronze
1929 Paris	René Rottenfluc (FRA)	Joseph Dillen (BEL)	Denis Perret (SUI)
1930 Brüksel	József Tasnádi (HUN)	François Van Langenhove (BEL)	Jean Chasson (FRA)
1931 Budapest	Hermanni Pihlajamäki (FIN)	Jean Chasson (FRA)	János Fehér (HUN)
1933 Paris	Ferenc Tóth (HUN)	Jean Vordermann (SUI)	Leborre (FRA)
1934 Stockholm	Márton Lőrincz (HUN)	Hermann Fischer (GER)	Herman Tuvesson (SWE)
1935 Brüksel	Kustaa Pihlajamäki (FIN)	Ferenc Tóth (HUN)	Adalberto Taucer (ITA)
1937 Münih	Ferenc Tóth (HUN)	Kustaa Pihlajamäki (FIN)	Josef Polák (TCH)
1946 Stockholm	Gazanfer Bilge (TUR)	Olle Anderberg (SWE)	Paavo Hietala (FIN)
1949 İstanbul	Olle Anderberg (SWE)	Hasan Sedyan (IRN)	Nurettin Zafer (ITA)
1966 Karlsruhe	Yelkan Tedeyev (URS)	Enyu Todorov (BUL)	Nihat Kabanlı (TUR)
1967 İstanbul	Nihat Kabanlı (TUR)	Mladen Georgiev (BUL)	Petre Coman (ROU)
1968 Skopje	Enyu Todorov (BUL)	Petre Coman (ROU)	Jürgen Luczak (GDR)
1969 Sofia	Enyu Todorov (BUL)	Petre Coman (ROU)	Zagalav Abdulbekov (URS)
1970 East Berlin	Enyu Todorov (BUL)	Viktor Markelov (URS)	Petre Coman (ROU)
1972 Katowice	Ruslan Pliyev (URS)	Mehmet Sarı (TUR)	Petre Coman (ROU)
1973 Losanna	İvan Yankov (BUL)	Zagalav Abdulbekov (URS)	Vehbi Akdağ (TUR)
1974 Madrid	Doncho Zhekov (BUL)	Petre Coman (ROU)	Théodule Toulotte (FRA)
1975 Ludwigshafen	İvan Yankov (BUL)	Helmut Strumpf (GDR)	Zagalav Abdulbekov (URS)
1976 Leningrad	Sergey Timofeyev (URS)	Petre Coman (ROU)	İvan Yankov (BUL)
1977 Bursa	Vladimir Yumin (URS)	Miho Dukov (BUL)	Lajos Sandor (ROU)
1978 Sofia	Miho Dukov (BUL)	Saypulla Absaidov (URS)	Zoltán Szalontai (HUN)
1979 Bucharest	Miho Dukov (BUL)	Eduard Giray (FRG)	Jan Szymański (POL)
1980 Prievidza	Magomedgasan Abushev (URS)	Simeon Shterev (BUL)	Zoltán Szalontai (HUN)
1981 Lodz	Buzai Ibraguimov (URS)	Marian Skubacz (POL)	Simeon Shterev (BUL)
1982 Varna	Simeon Shterev (BUL)	Yusuf Gambaz (TUR)	Buzai Ibraguimov (URS)
1983 Budapest	Simeon Shterev (BUL)	Ivan Grigoriev (URS)	József Orbán (HUN)
1984 Jönköping	Simeon Shterev (BUL)	Viktor Alexeyev (URS)	József Orbán (HUN)
1985 Leipzig	Lutz Remus (GDR)	Sirayudin Ayubov (URS)	Valentin Savov (BUL)
1986 Piraeus	Khazar Isayev (URS)	Valentin Savov (BUL)	Marian Skubacz (POL)
1987 Veliko Tarnovo	Khazar Isayev (URS)	Karsten Polky (GDR)	Marian Skubacz (POL)
1988 Manchester	Stepan Sarkisyan (URS)	Karsten Polky (GDR)	Simeon Shterev (BUL)
1989 Ankara	Alben Kumbarov (BUL)	Karsten Polky (GDR)	Giovanni Schillaci (ITA)
1990 Poznan	Ralf Lyding (FRG)	Karsten Polky (GDR)	Rosen Vasilev (BUL)
1991 Stuttgart	Metin Kaplan (TUR)	Gadzhi Rashidov (URS)	Ralf Lyding (GER)
1992 Kaposvár	Giovanni Schillaci (ITA)	Rosen Vasilev (BUL)	İsmail Faikoğlu (TUR)
1993 İstanbul	Magomed Azizov (RUS)	İlham Abbasov (AZE)	Štefan Fernyák (SVK)
1994 Rome	Muharrem Demireğen (TUR)	Araik Baghdadyan (ARM)	Giovanni Schillaci (ITA)
1995 Fribourg	Magomed Azizov (RUS)	Jürgen Scheibe (GER)	Sergey Smal (BLR)
1996 Budapest	Magomed Azizov (RUS)	Giovanni Schillaci (ITA)	Sergey Smal (BLR)
1997 Warsaw	Magomed Azizov (RUS)	Elbrus Tedeyev (UKR)	Serafim Barzakov (BUL)
1998 Bratislava	Serafim Barzakov (BUL)	Sergey Smal (BLR)	Elbrus Tedeyev (UKR)
1999 Minsk	Elbrus Tedeyev (UKR)	Serafim Barzakov (BUL)	Murad Umakhanov (RUS)
2000 Budapest	Murad Umakhanov (RUS)	Sergey Smal (BLR)	Serafim Barzakov (BUL)
2001 Budapest	Serafim Barzakov (BUL)	Soslan Tomayev (RUS)	Otar Tushishvili (GEO)
2002 Bakü	Arif Kama (TUR)	Vasyl Fedoryshyn (UKR)	Arif Abdullayev (AZE)
2003 Riga	Anatolie Guidea (BUL)	Arif Kama (TUR)	Petru Toarcă (ROU)
2004 Ankara	Tevfik Odabaşı (TUR)	Alan Dudayev (RUS)	Vasyl Fedoryshyn (UKR)
2005 Varna	Vasyl Fedoryshyn (UKR)	Didier Païs (FRA)	Murad Ramazanov (MKD)
2005 Varna	Vasyl Fedoryshyn (UKR)	Didier Païs (FRA)	Łukasz Góral (POL)
2006 Moscow	Mavlet Batirov (RUS)	Tevfik Odabaşı (TUR)	Anatolie Guidea (BUL)
2006 Moscow	Mavlet Batirov (RUS)	Tevfik Odabaşı (TUR)	Yevhen Havilov (UKR)
2007 Sofia	Vasyl Fedoryshyn (UKR)	Anatolie Guidea (BUL)	Gergõ Wöller (HUN)
2007 Sofia	Vasyl Fedoryshyn (UKR)	Anatolie Guidea (BUL)	Murad Ramazanov (MKD)
2008 Tampere	Vasyl Fedoryshyn (UKR)	Didier Païs (FRA)	Gergõ Wöller (HUN)
2008 Tampere	Vasyl Fedoryshyn (UKR)	Didier Païs (FRA)	Anatolie Guidea (BUL)
2009 Vilnius	Zelimkhan Huseynov (AZE)	Adam Batirov (RUS)	Malkhaz Kurdiani (GEO)
2009 Vilnius	Zelimkhan Huseynov (AZE)	Adam Batirov (RUS)	Vasyl Fedoryshyn (UKR)
2010 Bakü	Opan Sat (RUS)	Malkhaz Zarkua (GEO)	Andrei Perpelita (MDA)
2010 Bakü	Opan Sat (RUS)	Malkhaz Zarkua (GEO)	Vasyl Fedoryshyn (UKR)
2011 Dortmund	Opan Sat (RUS)	Sahit Prizreni (ALB)	Anatolie Guidea (BUL)
2011 Dortmund	Opan Sat (RUS)	Sahit Prizreni (ALB)	Vasyl Fedoryshyn (UKR)
2012 Belgrad	Toghrul Asgarov (AZE)	Anatolie Guidea (BUL)	Rasul Murtazaliev (RUS)
2012 Belgrad	Toghrul Asgarov (AZE)	Anatolie Guidea (BUL)	Malkhaz Zarkua (GEO)
2013 Tiflis	Opan Sat (RUS)	Vladimir Dubov (BUL)	Vladimer Khinchegashvili (GEO)
2013 Tiflis	Opan Sat (RUS)	Vladimir Dubov (BUL)	Tim Schleicher (GER)
2014 Vantaa	Haji Aliyev (AZE)	Bekkhan Goygereyev (RUS)	Andrei Perpelita (MDA)
2014 Vantaa	Haji Aliyev (AZE)	Bekkhan Goygereyev (RUS)	Vasyl Shuptar (UKR)
2015 Bakü	Aleksandr Bogomoev (RUS)	Beka Lomtadze (GEO)	Haji Aliyev (AZE)
2015 Bakü	Aleksandr Bogomoev (RUS)	Beka Lomtadze (GEO)	Vasyl Shuptar (UKR)
2016 Riga	Vladimer Khinchegashvili (GEO)	Heorhi Kaliyeu (BLR)	Ivan Guidea (GEO)
2016 Riga	Vladimer Khinchegashvili (GEO)	Heorhi Kaliyeu (BLR)	Haji Aliyev (AZE)
2017 Novi Sad	Vladimer Khinchegashvili (GEO)	Akhmed Chakaev (RUS)	Valodya Frangulyan (ARM)
2017 Novi Sad	Vladimer Khinchegashvili (GEO)	Akhmed Chakaev (RUS)	Andrei Perpeliță (MDA)
2018 Kaspiysk	Gadzhimurad Rashidov (RUS)	Beka Lomtadze (GEO)	Ivan Guidea (ROU)
2018 Kaspiysk	Gadzhimurad Rashidov (RUS)	Beka Lomtadze (GEO)	Recep Topal (TUR)
2019 Bucharest	Arsen Harutyunyan (ARM)	Beka Lomtadze (GEO)	Randy Vock (SUI)
2019 Bucharest	Arsen Harutyunyan (ARM)	Beka Lomtadze (GEO)	Recep Topal (TUR)
2020 Rome	Aleksandr Bogomoev (RUS)	Beka Lomtadze (GEO)	Nikolai Okhlopkov (ROU)
2020 Rome	Aleksandr Bogomoev (RUS)	Beka Lomtadze (GEO)	Arsen Harutyunyan (ARM)
2021 Warsaw	Abasgadzhi Magomedov (RUS)	Andrii Dzhelep (UKR)	Beka Lomtadze (GEO)
2021 Warsaw	Abasgadzhi Magomedov (RUS)	Andrii Dzhelep (UKR)	Eduard Grigorev (POL)
2022 Budapest	Arsen Harutyunyan (ARM)	Süleyman Atlı (TUR)	Eduard Grigorev (POL)
2022 Budapest	Arsen Harutyunyan (ARM)	Süleyman Atlı (TUR)	Georgi Vangelov (BUL)
2023 Zagreb	Arsen Harutyunyan (ARM)	Zelimkhan Abakarov (ALB)	Emrah Ormanoğlu (TUR)
2023 Zagreb	Arsen Harutyunyan (ARM)	Zelimkhan Abakarov (ALB)	Shota Phartenadze (GEO)
2024 Bucharest	Abasgadzhi Magomedov (ANA)	Zelimkhan Abakarov (ALB)	Nuraddin Novruzov (AZE)
2024 Bucharest	Abasgadzhi Magomedov (ANA)	Zelimkhan Abakarov (ALB)	Mezhlum Mezhlumyan (ARM)
2025 Bratislava	Zaur Uguev (UWW)	Arsen Harutyunyan (ARM)	Zelimkhan Abakarov (ALB)
2025 Bratislava	Zaur Uguev (UWW)	Arsen Harutyunyan (ARM)	Andrii Dzhelep (UKR)

== Lightweight ==
- 66 kg: 1929–1937
- 67 kg: 1946–1961
- 70 kg: 1962–1967
- 68 kg: 1969–1995
- 69 kg: 1997–2001
- 66 kg: 2002–2013
- 65 kg: 2014–

Tournament	Gold	Silver	Bronze
1929 Paris	Erik Malmberg (SWE)	Károly Kárpáti (HUN)	Reginald Edwards (GBR)
1930 Brüksel	Károly Kárpáti (HUN)	Englebert Mollin (BEL)	Erik Malmberg (SWE)
1931 Budapest	Hans Minder (SUI)	Kustaa Pihlajamäki (FIN)	A. Delos (FRA)
1933 Paris	Wolfgang Ehrl (SUI)	Anders Swansson (FRA)	Not awarded
1934 Stockholm	Wolfgang Ehrl (GER)	Anders Swansson (SWE)	Abraham Kurland (DEN)
1935 Brüksel	Károly Kárpáti (HUN)	Hermanni Pihlajamäki (FIN)	Wolfgang Ehrl (GER)
1937 Münih	Heinrich Nettesheim (GER)	Gösta Frändfors (SWE)	Fritz Vordermann (SUI)
1946 Stockholm	Celal Atik (TUR)	Gösta Frändfors (SWE)	Lauri Kangas (FIN)
1949 İstanbul	Servet Meriç (TUR)	Abdullah Moytabavi (IRN)	Paavo Pihlajamäki (FIN)
1966 Karlsruhe	Zarbeg Beriashvili (URS)	Seyit Ahmet Ağralı (TUR)	Stoyan Bimbalov (BUL)
1967 İstanbul	Zarbeg Beriashvili (URS)	Jan Karlsson (SWE)	Enyu Valchev (BUL)
1968 Skopje	Enyu Valchev (BUL)	Yuri Gusov (URS)	Jan Karlsson (SWE)
1969 Sofia	Enyu Valchev (BUL)	Nodar Hohaşvili (URS)	Josef Engel (TCH)
1970 East Berlin	Ismail Yuseinov (BUL)	József Rusznyák (HUN)	Šefer Saliovski (YUG)
1972 Katowice	İsmail Yuseinov (BUL)	Petre Poalelungi (ROU)	Šefer Saliovski (YUG)
1973 Losanna	Nasrula Nasrulayev (URS)	Stefan Stoikov (BUL)	Ali Şahin (TUR)
1974 Madrid	Ivan Vasilev (BUL)	Mahmet Ibraguimov (URS)	Gerald Brauer (GDR)
1975 Ludwigshafen	Ijaku Gaidarbekov (URS)	Mehmet Sarı (TUR)	Gerhard Weisenberger (FRG)
1976 Leningrad	Alekssandr Matveyev (URS)	İsmail Yuseinov (BUL)	Eberhard Probst (GDR)
1977 Bursa	Šaban Sejdi (YUG)	Mehmet Sarı (TUR)	İhaku Gaydarbekov (URS)
1978 Sofia	Ivan Yankov (BUL)	İhaku Gaydarbekov (URS)	Dariusz Czichowski (POL)
1979 Bucharest	Nikolay Petrenko (URS)	Ivan Yankov (BUL)	Eberhard Probst (GDR)
1980 Prievidza	Saypulla Absaidov (URS)	Ivan Yankov (BUL)	Stanisław Chiliński (POL)
1981 Lodz	Miho Dukov (BUL)	Mikhail Jarachura (URS)	Eberhard Probst (GDR)
1982 Varna	Boris Budayev (URS)	Zoltán Szalontai (HUN)	Ivan Yankov (BUL)
1983 Budapest	Kamen Penev (BUL)	Fevzi Şeker (TUR)	David Guigauri (URS)
1984 Jönköping	Arsen Fadzayev (URS)	Jan Szymański (POL)	Kamen Penev (BUL)
1985 Leipzig	Arsen Fadzayev (URS)	Fevzi Şeker (TUR)	Simeon Shterev (BUL)
1986 Piraeus	Abdula Magomedov (URS)	Simeon Shterev (BUL)	Jan Szymański (POL)
1987 Veliko Tarnovo	Arsen Fadzayev (URS)	Yeoryos Athanasiadis (GRE)	Simeon Shterev (BUL)
1988 Manchester	Arsen Fadzayev (URS)	Attila Podolszki (HUN)	Bejshchet Selimov (BUL)
1989 Ankara	Nikolai Kasabov (BUL)	Georg Schwabenland (GER)	Yüksel Dinçer (TUR)
1990 Poznan	Fevzi Şeker (TUR)	Georg Schwabenland (GER)	Abdula Magomedov (URS)
1991 Stuttgart	Georg Schwabenland (GER)	Max Geller (ISR)	Gérard Santoro (FRA)
1992 Kaposvár	Georg Schwabenland (GER)	Boris Budayev (CIS)	Valentin Getsov (BUL)
1993 İstanbul	Zaza Zazirov (UKR)	Arayik Gevorgyan (ARM)	Gocha Makoyev (RUS)
1994 Rome	Vadim Bogiev (RUS)	Arayik Gevorgyan (ARM)	Roman Motrovich (UKR)
1995 Fribourg	Vadim Bogiev (RUS)	Yüksel Şanlı (TUR)	Arayik Gevorgyan (ARM)
1996 Budapest	Vadim Bogiev (RUS)	Arayik Gevorgyan (ARM)	Zaza Zazirov (UKR)
1997 Warsaw	Arayik Gevorgyan (ARM)	Yüksel Şanlı (TUR)	Zaza Zazirov (UKR)
1998 Bratislava	Yüksel Şanlı (TUR)	Zaza Zazirov (UKR)	Velijan Alajverdiyev (RUS)
1999 Minsk	Zaza Zazirov (UKR)	Velijan Alajverdiyev (UKR)	Emzarios Bentinidis (GEO)
2000 Budapest	Emzarios Bentinidis (GEO)	Syarhey Dzyamçanka (BLR)	Nikolay Paslar (BUL)
2001 Budapest	Ahmet Gülhan (TUR)	Irbek Farniev (RUS)	Nikolay Paslar (BUL)
2002 Bakü	Zaur Botayev (RUS)	Elman Asgarov (AZE)	Nikolay Paslar (BUL)
2003 Riga	Irbek Farniev (RUS)	Elbrus Tedeyev (UKR)	Ömer Çubukçu (TUR)
2004 Ankara	Makhach Murtazaliev (RUS)	Elbrus Tedeyev (UKR)	Ömer Çubukçu (TUR)
2005 Varna	Serafim Barzakov (BUL)	Elman Asgarov (AZE)	Andriy Stadnik (UKR)
2005 Varna	Serafim Barzakov (BUL)	Elman Asgarov (AZE)	Albert Batyrov (BLR)
2006 Moscow	Makhach Murtazaliev (RUS)	Albert Batyrov (BLR)	Serafim Barzakov (BUL)
2006 Moscow	Makhach Murtazaliev (RUS)	Albert Batyrov (BLR)	Vadim Guigolaev (FRA)
2007 Sofia	Albert Batyrov (BLR)	Irbek Farniev (RUS)	Serafim Barzakov (BUL)
2007 Sofia	Albert Batyrov (BLR)	Irbek Farniev (RUS)	Ramazan Şahin (TUR)
2008 Tampere	Ramazan Şahin (TUR)	Koba Kakaladze (GEO)	Rasul Djukayev (RUS)
2008 Tampere	Ramazan Şahin (TUR)	Koba Kakaladze (GEO)	Emin Azizov (AZE)
2009 Vilnius	Andriy Stadnik (UKR)	Jabrayil Hasanov (AZE)	Malkhaz Muziashvili (GEO)
2009 Vilnius	Andriy Stadnik (UKR)	Jabrayil Hasanov (AZE)	Zhirayr Hovhannisyan (ARM)
2010 Bakü	Jabrayil Hasanov (AZE)	Magomedmurad Gadzhiev (RUS)	Otar Tushishvili (GEO)
2010 Bakü	Jabrayil Hasanov (AZE)	Magomedmurad Gadzhiev (RUS)	Adam Sobieraj (POL)
2011 Dortmund	Jabrayil Hasanov (AZE)	Leonid Bazan (BUL)	Adam Batirov (RUS)
2011 Dortmund	Jabrayil Hasanov (AZE)	Leonid Bazan (BUL)	Arasch Saba Bolaghi (GER)
2012 Belgrad	Alan Gogayev (RUS)	Leonid Bazan (BUL)	Devid Safaryan (ARM)
2012 Belgrad	Alan Gogayev (RUS)	Leonid Bazan (BUL)	Gergely Woller (HUN)
2013 Tiflis	David Safaryan (ARM)	Yakup Gör (TUR)	Alexandr Kontoyev (BLR)
2013 Tiflis	David Safaryan (ARM)	Yakup Gör (TUR)	Ilyas Bekbulatov (RUS)
2014 Vantaa	Magomed Kurbanaliev (RUS)	Servet Coşkun (TUR)	Borislav Novachkov (BUL)
2014 Vantaa	Magomed Kurbanaliev (RUS)	Servet Coşkun (TUR)	Konstantine Khabalashvili (GEO)
2015 Bakü	Toghrul Asgarov (AZE)	Frank Chamizo (ITA)	Mustafa Kaya (TUR)
2015 Bakü	Toghrul Asgarov (AZE)	Frank Chamizo (ITA)	Ilyas Bekbulatov (RUS)
2016 Riga	Frank Chamizo (RUS)	Mustafa Kaya (TUR)	Israil Kasumov (RUS)
2016 Riga	Frank Chamizo (RUS)	Mustafa Kaya (TUR)	Semen Radulov (UKR)
2017 Novi Sad	Ilyas Bekbulatov (RUS)	Borislav Novachkov (BUL)	David Habat (SLO)
2017 Novi Sad	Ilyas Bekbulatov (RUS)	Borislav Novachkov (BUL)	Zurabi Iakobishvili (GEO)
2018 Kaspiysk	Haji Aliyev (AZE)	Ilyas Bekbulatov (RUS)	Selahattin Kılıçsallayan (TUR)
2018 Kaspiysk	Haji Aliyev (AZE)	Ilyas Bekbulatov (RUS)	Vladimer Khinchegashvili (GEO)
2019 Bucharest	Haji Aliyev (AZE)	Selahattin Kılıçsallayan (TUR)	Nachyn Kuular (RUS)
2019 Bucharest	Haji Aliyev (AZE)	Selahattin Kılıçsallayan (TUR)	Vasyl Shuptar (UKR)
2020 Rome	Kurban Shiraev (RUS)	Niurgun Skriabin (BLR)	Ali Rahimzade (AZE)
2020 Rome	Kurban Shiraev (RUS)	Niurgun Skriabin (BLR)	Erik Arushanian (UKR)
2021 Warsaw	Zagir Shakhiev (RUS)	Krzysztof Bieńkowski (POL)	Ali Rahimzade (AZE)
2021 Warsaw	Zagir Shakhiev (RUS)	Krzysztof Bieńkowski (POL)	Maxim Saculțan (MDA)
2022 Budapest	Iszmail Muszukajev (HUN)	Haji Aliyev (AZE)	Münir Recep Aktaş (TUR)
2022 Budapest	Iszmail Muszukajev (HUN)	Haji Aliyev (AZE)	Islam Dudaev (ALB)
2023 Zagreb	Vazgen Tevanyan (ARM)	Mikyay Naim (BUL)	Erik Arushanian (UKR)
2023 Zagreb	Vazgen Tevanyan (ARM)	Mikyay Naim (BUL)	Edemi Bolkvadze (GEO)
2024 Bucharest	Islam Dudaev (ALB)	Gadzhimurad Rashidov (ANA)	Andre Clarke (GER)
2024 Bucharest	Islam Dudaev (ALB)	Gadzhimurad Rashidov (ANA)	Ali Rahimzade (AZE)
2025 Bratislava	Ibragim Ibragimov (UWW)	Khamzat Arsamerzouev (FRA)	Vazgen Tevanyan (ARM)
2025 Bratislava	Ibragim Ibragimov (UWW)	Khamzat Arsamerzouev (FRA)	Ali Rahimzade (AZE)

== Light welterweight ==
- 70 kg: 2014–

Tournament	Gold	Silver	Bronze
2014 Vantaa	Ruslan Dibirgadjiyev (RUS)	Grigor Grigoryan (ARM)	Miroslav Kirov (BUL)
2014 Vantaa	Ruslan Dibirgadjiyev (RUS)	Grigor Grigoryan (ARM)	Yakup Gör (TUR)
2015 Bakü	Magomedrasul Gazimagomedov (RUS)	Magomedmurad Gadzhiev (POL)	Yakup Gör (TUR)
2015 Bakü	Magomedrasul Gazimagomedov (RUS)	Magomedmurad Gadzhiev (POL)	Ruslan Dibirgadjiyev (AZE)
2016 Riga	Magomedmurad Gadzhiev (POL)	Davit Tlashadze (GEO)	Nikolay Kurtev (BUL)
2016 Riga	Magomedmurad Gadzhiev (POL)	Davit Tlashadze (GEO)	Azamat Nurykau (BLR)
2017 Novi Sad	Frank Chamizo (ITA)	Magomedmurad Gadzhiev (POL)	Ruslan Dibirgadjiyev (AZE)
2017 Novi Sad	Frank Chamizo (ITA)	Magomedmurad Gadzhiev (POL)	Israil Kasumov (RUS)
2018 Kaspiysk	Magomed Kurbanaliev (RUS)	Magomedmurad Gadzhiev (POL)	Zurabi Iakobishvili (GEO)
2018 Kaspiysk	Magomed Kurbanaliev (RUS)	Magomedmurad Gadzhiev (POL)	Murtazali Muslimov (AZE)
2019 Bucharest	Mustafa Kaya (TUR)	Ağahüseyn Mustafayev (AZE)	Magomedmurad Gadzhiev (POL)
2019 Bucharest	Mustafa Kaya (TUR)	Ağahüseyn Mustafayev (AZE)	Magomedrasul Gazimagomedov (RUS)
2020 Rome	Magomedmurad Gadzhiev (POL)	Ağahüseyn Mustafayev (AZE)	Haydar Yavuz (TUR)
2020 Rome	Magomedmurad Gadzhiev (POL)	Ağahüseyn Mustafayev (AZE)	Mihail Sava (MDA)
2021 Warsaw	Israil Kasumov (RUS)	Turan Bayramov (AZE)	Ihor Nykyforuk (UKR)
2021 Warsaw	Israil Kasumov (RUS)	Turan Bayramov (AZE)	Arman Andreasyan (ARM)
2022 Budapest	Zurabi Iakobishvili (GEO)	Arman Andreasyan (ARM)	Nicolai Grahmez (MDA)
2022 Budapest	Zurabi Iakobishvili (GEO)	Arman Andreasyan (ARM)	Ramazan Ramazanov (BUL)
2023 Zagreb	Haji Aliyev (AZE)	Ramazan Ramazanov (BUL)	Vasile Diacon (MDA)
2023 Zagreb	Haji Aliyev (AZE)	Ramazan Ramazanov (BUL)	Ihor Nykyforuk (UKR)
2024 Bucharest	Arman Andreasyan (ARM)	Akaki Kemertelidze (GEO)	Ramazan Ramazanov (BUL)
2024 Bucharest	Arman Andreasyan (ARM)	Akaki Kemertelidze (GEO)	Ismail Musukaev (HUN)
2025 Bratislava	David Baev (UWW)	Arman Andreasyan (ARM)	Akaki Kemertelidze (GEO)
2025 Bratislava	David Baev (UWW)	Arman Andreasyan (ARM)	Kanan Heybatov (AZE)

== Welterweight ==
- 72 kg: 1929–1937
- 73 kg: 1946–1961
- 78 kg: 1962–1967
- 74 kg: 1969–1995
- 76 kg: 1997–2001
- 74 kg: 2002–

Tournament	Gold	Silver	Bronze
1929 Paris	Hyacinthe Roosen (BEL)	Alvar Eriksson (SWE)	Fritz Käsermann (SUI)
1930 Brüksel	Hyacinthe Roosen (BEL)	Fritz Käsermann (SUI)	Algot Malmberg (SWE)
1931 Budapest	Jean Földeák (GER)	Gyula Zombori (HUN)	Charles Pacôme (FRA)
1933 Paris	Jean Földeák (GER)	Hans Minder (SUI)	P. Arnaud (FRA)
1934 Stockholm	Jean Földeák (GER)	Thure Andersson (SWE)	Károly Kárpáti (HUN)
1935 Brüksel	Stig Andersson (SWE)	Fritz Schäfer (GER)	Willy Angst (SUI)
1937 Münih	Fritz Schäfer (GER)	Willy Angst (SUI)	Antti Mäki (FIN)
1946 Stockholm	Yaşar Doğu (TUR)	Kálmán Sóvari (HUN)	Karl Schaad (SUI)
1949 İstanbul	Celal Atik (TUR)	Ali Gafari (IRN)	Per Berlin (SWE)
1966 Karlsruhe	Yury Shakhmuradov (URS)	Mahmut Atalay (TUR)	Turan Aladzhikov (BUL)
1967 İstanbul	Yury Shakhmuradov (URS)	Mahmut Atalay (TUR)	Károly Bajkó (HUN)
1968 Skopje	Daniel Robin (FRA)	Károly Bajkó (HUN)	Guram Sagaradze (URS)
1969 Sofia	Yuri Gusov (URS)	Wolfgang Nitschke (GDR)	Adolf Seger (FRG)
1970 East Berlin	Zarbeg Beriashvili (URS)	Jan Karlsson (SWE)	Anguel Petrov (BUL)
1972 Katowice	Adolf Seger (FRG)	Roman Marsageşvili (URS)	Yancho Pavlov (BUL)
1973 Losanna	Adolf Seger (FRG)	Viktor Zilberman (URS)	Frank Birke (GDR)
1974 Madrid	Ruslan Ashuraliyev (URS)	Adolf Seger (FRG)	Yancho Pavlov (BUL)
1975 Ludwigshafen	Pavel Pinigin (URS)	Dan Karabin (TCH)	Servet Aydemir (TUR)
1976 Leningrad	Dan Karabin (TCH)	Marin Pîrcălabu (ROU)	Fred Hempel (GDR)
1977 Bursa	Pyotr Marta (URS)	Reşit Karabacak (TUR)	Kristian Emilian (ROU)
1978 Sofia	Pyotr Marta (URS)	Marin Pîrcălabu (ROU)	Reşit Karabacak (TUR)
1979 Bucharest	Musan Abdul-Muslimov (URS)	Martin Knosp (FRG)	Aleksandar Nanev (BUL)
1980 Prievidza	Martin Knosp (FRG)	Reinhold Steingräber (GDR)	Gueorgui Makasarishvili (URS)
1981 Lodz	Elbrus Koroyev (URS)	Valentin Raychev (BUL)	Martin Knosp (FRG)
1982 Varna	Martin Knosp (FRG)	Pekka Rauhala (FIN)	Yuri Vorobiov (URS)
1983 Budapest	Shaban Sejdiu (YUG)	Pekka Rauhala (FIN)	Vladimir Dzugutov (URS)
1984 Jönköping	Taram Magomadov (URS)	Martin Knosp (FRG)	Kemal Padarev (BUL)
1985 Leipzig	Anatoli Polomarov (URS)	Kemal Padarev (BUL)	Martin Knosp (FRG)
1986 Piraeus	Adlan Varayev (URS)	Claudiu Tămăduianu (ROU)	Kemal Padarev (BUL)
1987 Veliko Tarnovo	Adlan Varayev (URS)	Pekka Rauhala (FIN)	Fevzi Şeker (TUR)
1988 Manchester	Adlan Varayev (URS)	Pekka Rauhala (FIN)	Rahmat Sofiadi (BUL)
1989 Ankara	Nasir Gadžihanov (URS)	Valentin Zhelev (BUL)	Fevzi Şeker (TUR)
1990 Poznan	Nasir Gadžihanov (URS)	Claudiu Tămăduianu (ROU)	Valentin Zhelev (BUL)
1991 Stuttgart	Alexander Leipold (GER)	Nasir Gadžihanov (URS)	Selahattin Yiğit (TUR)
1992 Kaposvár	Məmmədsalam Haciyev (CIS)	Valentin Zhelev (BUL)	Krzysztof Walencik (POL)
1993 İstanbul	André Backhaus (GER)	János Nagy (HUN)	Victor Peicov (MDA)
1994 Rome	Nasir Gadžihanov (RUS)	Turan Ceylan (TUR)	Alexander Leipold (GER)
1995 Fribourg	Alexander Leipold (GER)	Turan Ceylan (TUR)	Nasir Gadžihanov (RUS)
1996 Budapest	Buvaisar Saitiev (RUS)	Radion Kertanti (SVK)	Valeri Verjushin (MKD)
1997 Warsaw	Buvaisar Saitiev (RUS)	Alexander Leipold (GER)	Kamil Kocaoğlu (TUR)
1998 Bratislava	Alexander Leipold (GER)	Arayik Gevorgyan (ARM)	Adam Saitiev (RUS)
1999 Minsk	Adam Saitiev (RUS)	Alik Musayev (UKR)	Alexander Leipold (GER)
2000 Budapest	Buvaisar Saitiev (RUS)	Adem Bereket (TUR)	Guram Mchedlidze (GEO)
2001 Budapest	Buvaisar Saitiev (RUS)	Miroslav Gochev (BUL)	Árpád Ritter (HUN)
2002 Bakü	Árpád Ritter (HUN)	Murad Gaidarov (BLR)	Magomed İsagaciyev (RUS)
2003 Riga	Árpád Ritter (HUN)	Alexander Leipold (GER)	Murad Gaidarov (BLR)
2004 Ankara	Ruslan Kokayev (RUS)	Murad Gaidarov (BLR)	Emzarios Bentinidis (GRE)
2005 Varna	Nikolay Paslar (BUL)	Serguei Vitkovski (RUS)	Ahmet Gülhan (TUR)
2005 Varna	Nikolay Paslar (BUL)	Serguei Vitkovski (RUS)	Volodymyr Syrotin (UKR)
2006 Moscow	Buvaisar Saitiev (RUS)	Ruslan Kokayev (ARM)	Gábor Hatos (HUN)
2006 Moscow	Buvaisar Saitiev (RUS)	Ruslan Kokayev (ARM)	Krystian Brzozowski (POL)
2007 Sofia	Makhach Murtazaliev (RUS)	Gela Saghirashvili (GEO)	Chamsulvara Chamsulvarayev (AZE)
2007 Sofia	Makhach Murtazaliev (RUS)	Gela Saghirashvili (GEO)	Emzarios Bentinidis (GRE)
2008 Tampere	Makhach Murtazaliev (RUS)	Murad Gaidarov (BLR)	Emzarios Bentinidis (GRE)
2008 Tampere	Makhach Murtazaliev (RUS)	Murad Gaidarov (BLR)	Chamsulvara Chamsulvarayev (AZE)
2009 Vilnius	Chamsulvara Chamsulvarayev (AZE)	Fırat Binici (TUR)	Kiril Terziev (BUL)
2009 Vilnius	Chamsulvara Chamsulvarayev (AZE)	Fırat Binici (TUR)	Murad Gaidarov (BLR)
2010 Bakü	Denis Tsargush (RUS)	Kiril Terziev (BUL)	Chamsulvara Chamsulvarayev (AZE)
2010 Bakü	Denis Tsargush (RUS)	Kiril Terziev (BUL)	Batuhan Demirçin (TUR)
2011 Dortmund	Denis Tsargush (RUS)	Musa Murtazaliev (ARM)	Gábor Hatos (HUN)
2011 Dortmund	Denis Tsargush (RUS)	Musa Murtazaliev (ARM)	Davit Khutsishvili (GEO)
2012 Belgrad	Denis Tsargush (RUS)	Davit Khutsisvili (GEO)	Gabor Hatos (HUN)
2012 Belgrad	Denis Tsargush (RUS)	Davit Khutsisvili (GEO)	Aleksander Gostiev (AZE)
2013 Tiflis	Aniuar Geduev (RUS)	Gábor Hatos (HUN)	Giya Chykhladze (UKR)
2013 Tiflis	Aniuar Geduev (RUS)	Gábor Hatos (HUN)	Leonid Bazan (BUL)
2014 Vantaa	Aniuar Geduev (RUS)	Jabrayil Hasanov (AZE)	Soner Demirtaş (TUR)
2014 Vantaa	Aniuar Geduev (RUS)	Jabrayil Hasanov (AZE)	Krystian Brzozowski (POL)
2015 Bakü	Aniuar Geduev (RUS)	Soner Demirtaş (TUR)	Jabrayil Hasanov (AZE)
2015 Bakü	Aniuar Geduev (RUS)	Soner Demirtaş (TUR)	Jumber Kvelaşvili (GEO)
2016 Riga	Soner Demirtaş (TUR)	Jabrayil Hasanov (AZE)	Jakob Makarashvili (GEO)
2016 Riga	Soner Demirtaş (TUR)	Jabrayil Hasanov (AZE)	Zaur Makiev (RUS)
2017 Novi Sad	Soner Demirtaş (TUR)	Murad Süleymanov (AZE)	Akhmed Gadzhimagomedov (RUS)
2017 Novi Sad	Soner Demirtaş (TUR)	Murad Süleymanov (AZE)	Grigor Grigoryan (ARM)
2018 Kaspiysk	Soner Demirtaş (TUR)	Zelimkhan Khadjiev (FRA)	Andrei Karpach (BLR)
2018 Kaspiysk	Soner Demirtaş (TUR)	Zelimkhan Khadjiev (FRA)	Frank Chamizo (ITA)
2019 Bucharest	Frank Chamizo (ITA)	Zelimkhan Khadjiev (FRA)	Timur Bizhoev (RUS)
2019 Bucharest	Frank Chamizo (ITA)	Zelimkhan Khadjiev (FRA)	Avtandil Kentchadze (GEO)
2020 Rome	Frank Chamizo (ITA)	Magomedrasul Gazimagomedov (RUS)	Avtandil Kentchadze (GEO)
2020 Rome	Frank Chamizo (ITA)	Magomedrasul Gazimagomedov (RUS)	Soner Demirtaş (TUR)
2021 Warsaw	Tajmuraz Salkazanov (SVK)	Miroslav Kirov (BUL)	Frank Chamizo (ITA)
2021 Warsaw	Tajmuraz Salkazanov (SVK)	Miroslav Kirov (BUL)	Mitch Finesilver (ISR)
2022 Budapest	Tajmuraz Salkazanov (SVK)	Frank Chamizo (ITA)	Turan Bayramov (AZE)
2022 Budapest	Tajmuraz Salkazanov (SVK)	Frank Chamizo (ITA)	Giorgi Sulava (GEO)
2023 Zagreb	Tajmuraz Salkazanov (SVK)	Frank Chamizo (ITA)	Avtandil Kentchadze (GEO)
2023 Zagreb	Tajmuraz Salkazanov (SVK)	Frank Chamizo (ITA)	Soner Demirtaş (TUR)
2024 Bucharest	Tajmuraz Salkazanov (SVK)	Soner Demirtaş (TUR)	Turan Bayramov (AZE)
2024 Bucharest	Tajmuraz Salkazanov (SVK)	Soner Demirtaş (TUR)	Imam Ganishov (ANA)
2025 Bratislava	Chermen Valiev (ALB)	Zaurbek Sidakov (UWW)	Aghanazar Novruzov (AZE)
2025 Bratislava	Chermen Valiev (ALB)	Zaurbek Sidakov (UWW)	Tajmuraz Salkazanov (SVK)

== Light middleweight ==
- 79 kg: 2018–

Tournament	Gold	Silver	Bronze
2018 Kaspiysk	Akhmed Gadzhimagomedov (RUS)	Martin Obst (GER)	Mihály Nagy (HUN)
2018 Kaspiysk	Akhmed Gadzhimagomedov (RUS)	Martin Obst (GER)	Jabrayil Hasanov (AZE)
2019 Bucharest	Jabrayil Hasanov (AZE)	Akhmed Gadzhimagomedov (RUS)	Nika Kentchadze (GEO)
2019 Bucharest	Jabrayil Hasanov (AZE)	Akhmed Gadzhimagomedov (RUS)	Muhammet Nuri Kotanoğlu (TUR)
2020 Rome	Mahamedkhabib Kadzimahamedau (BLR)	Magomed Ramazanov (RUS)	Vasyl Mykhailov (UKR)
2020 Rome	Mahamedkhabib Kadzimahamedau (BLR)	Magomed Ramazanov (RUS)	Jabrayil Hasanov (AZE)
2021 Warsaw	Achsarbek Gulajev (SVK)	Saifedine Alekma (FRA)	Nika Kentchadze (GEO)
2021 Warsaw	Achsarbek Gulajev (SVK)	Saifedine Alekma (FRA)	Alans Amirovs (LAT)
2022 Budapest	Georgios Kougioumtsidis (GRE)	Ashraf Ashirov (AZE)	Muhammet Akdeniz (TUR)
2022 Budapest	Georgios Kougioumtsidis (GRE)	Ashraf Ashirov (AZE)	Vladimeri Gamkrelidze (GEO)
2023 Zagreb	Vasyl Mykhailov (UKR)	Georgios Kougioumtsidis (GRE)	Khetag Tsabolov (SRB)
2023 Zagreb	Vasyl Mykhailov (UKR)	Georgios Kougioumtsidis (GRE)	Ahmad Magomedov (MKD)
2024 Bucharest	Akhmed Usmanov (ANA)	Mahamedkhabib Kadzimahamedau (ANA)	Avtandil Kentchadze (GEO)
2024 Bucharest	Akhmed Usmanov (ANA)	Mahamedkhabib Kadzimahamedau (ANA)	Frank Chamizo (ITA)
2025 Bratislava	Akhmed Usmanov (UWW)	Zelimkhan Khadjiev (FRA)	Achsarbek Gulajev (SVK)
2025 Bratislava	Akhmed Usmanov (UWW)	Zelimkhan Khadjiev (FRA)	Vladimeri Gamkrelidze (GEO)

== Middleweight ==
- 79 kg: 1946–1961
- 87 kg: 1962–1968
- 82 kg: 1969–1995
- 85 kg: 1997–2001
- 84 kg: 2002–2013
- 86 kg: 2014–

Tournament	Gold	Silver	Bronze
1946 Stockholm	Eino Virtanen (FIN)	Mahmut Ceterez (TUR)	Axel Grönberg (SWE)
1949 Istanbul	Yaşar Doğu (TUR)	Axel Grönberg (SWE)	Muhammed Musa (EGY)
1966 Karlsruhe	Hasan Güngör; Turkey	Josef Urban; Czechoslovakia	Andrei Tsjovrebov; Soviet Union
1967 İstanbul	Boris Gurevich; Soviet Union	Francisc Balla; Romania	Prodan Gardzhev; Bulgaria
1968 Skopje	Andrei Tsjovrebov; Soviet Union	Prodan Gardzhev; Bulgaria	Francisc Balla; Romania
1969 Sofia	Yuri Shajmuradov; Soviet Union	Károly Bajkó; Hungary	Ivan Iliev; Bulgaria
1970 East Berlin	Horst Stottmeister; East Germany	Ivan Iliev; Bulgaria	Vasile Iorga; Romania
1972 Katowice	Vasili Siulzhin; Soviet Union	Ivan Iliev; Bulgaria	Wolfgang Nitschke; East Germany
1973 Losanna	Vasili Siulzhin; Soviet Union	Hayri Polat; Turkey	Benno Paulitz; East Germany
1974 Madrid	Viktor Novozhilov; Soviet Union	Benno Paulitz; East Germany	Vasile Iorga; Romania
1975 Ludwigshafen	Ismail Abilov; Bulgaria	Vasile Iorga; Romania	Günter Spindler; East Germany
1976 Leningrad	Adolf Seger; West Germany	Ismail Abilov; Bulgaria	Viktor Novozhilov; Soviet Union
1977 Bursa	Ismail Abilov; Bulgaria	Jasan Zanguiyev; Soviet Union	Jan Górski; Poland
1978 Sofia	Shukri Ajmedov; Bulgaria	Adolf Seger; West Germany	Tiberiu Seregelyi; Romania
1979 Bucharest	Oleg Alekseev; Soviet Union	István Kovács; Hungary	Adolf Seger; West Germany
1980 Prievidza	Ismail Abilov (BUL)	Oleg Kaloyev (URS)	Günter Bussarello (AUT)
1981 Lodz	Oleg Kaloyev (URS)	Efraim Kamberov (BUL)	Peter Syring (GDR)
1982 Varna	Efraim Kamberov (BUL)	Vladimir Modosian (URS)	Peter Syring (GDR)
1983 Budapest	Reşit Karabacak (TUR)	Efraim Kamberov (BUL)	Gueorgui Makasarishvili (URS)
1984 Jönköping	Efraim Kamberov (BUL)	Reiner Trik (FRG)	Lukman Zhabrailov (URS)
1985 Leipzig	Yuri Vorobiov (URS)	Hans-Peter Franz (GDR)	Leszek Ciota (POL)
1986 Piraeus	Alexandar Nanev (BUL)	Vagab Kazibekov (URS)	Jozef Lohyňa (TCH)
1987 Veliko Tarnovo	Alexandar Nanev (BUL)	Vladimir Modosian (URS)	Jozef Lohyňa (TCH)
1988 Manchester	Yuri Vorobiov (URS)	Hans Gstöttner (GDR)	Alexandar Nanev (BUL)
1989 Ankara	Not Awarded	Necmi Gençalp; Turkey; Jozef Lohyňa; Czechoslovakia	Elmadi Zhabrailov (URS)
1990 Poznan	Hans Gstöttner (GDR)	Elmadi Zhabrailov (URS)	Sebahattin Öztürk (TUR)
1991 Stuttgart	Elmadi Zhabrailov (URS)	Hans Gstöttner (GER)	Sebahattin Öztürk (TUR)
1992 Kaposvár	Sebahattin Öztürk (TUR)	László Dvorák (HUN)	Rustem Kelejsayev (CIS)
1993 İstanbul	Rustem Kelejsayev (RUS)	Sebahattin Öztürk (TUR)	Aleksandr Savko (BLR)
1994 Rome	Rustem Kelejsayev (RUS)	Lukman Zhabrailov (MDA)	Hans Gstöttner (GER)
1995 Fribourg	Magomed Ibragimov (AZE)	Serhiy Hubrynyuk (UKR)	Rasul Katinovasov (RUS)
1996 Budapest	Magomed Ibragimov (AZE)	László Dvorák (HUN)	Khadzhimurad Magomedov (RUS)
1997 Warsaw	Khadzhimurad Magomedov (RUS)	Nicolae Ghiță (ROU)	Davyd Bichinashvili (UKR)
1998 Bratislava	Buvaisar Saitiev (RUS)	Davyd Bichinashvili (UKR)	Jozef Lohyňa (SVK)
1999 Minsk	Magomed Ibragimov (MKD)	Igors Samušonoks (LAT)	Shamil Isayev (RUS)
2000 Budapest	Adam Saitiev (RUS)	Beibulat Musaev (GER)	Gábor Kapuvári (HUN)
2001 Budapest	Sazhid Sazhidov (RUS)	Davyd Bichinashvili (UKR)	Beibulat Musaev (BLR)
2002 Baku	Sazhid Sazhidov (RUS)	Beibulat Musaev (BLR)	Revaz Mindorashvili (GEO)
2003 Riga	Revaz Mindorashvili (GEO)	Mamed Aghaev (ARM)	Vadim Laliev (RUS)
2004 Ankara	Gökhan Yavaşer (TUR)	Revaz Mindorashvili (GEO)	Lazaros Loizidis (GRE)
2005 Varna	Taras Danko (UKR)	Serhat Balcı (TUR)	Lazaros Loizidis (GRE)
2005 Varna	Taras Danko (UKR)	Serhat Balcı (TUR)	Nauruz Temrezov (RUS)
2006 Moscow	Adam Saitiev (RUS)	Serhat Balcı (TUR)	Vadim Laliev (ARM)
2006 Moscow	Adam Saitiev (RUS)	Serhat Balcı (TUR)	Taras Danko (UKR)
2007 Sofia	Georgy Ketoev (RUS)	Taras Danko (UKR)	Árpád Ritter (HUN)
2007 Sofia	Georgy Ketoev (RUS)	Taras Danko (UKR)	Serhat Balcı (TUR)
2008 Tampere	Georgy Ketoev (RUS)	Revaz Mindorashvili (GEO)	David Bichinashvili (GER)
2008 Tampere	Georgy Ketoev (RUS)	Revaz Mindorashvili (GEO)	Novruz Temrezov (AZE)
2009 Vilnius	Soslan Ktsoyev (RUS)	Ibrahim Aldatov (UKR)	Novruz Temrezov (AZE)
2009 Vilnius	Soslan Ktsoyev (RUS)	Ibrahim Aldatov (UKR)	Gökhan Yavaşer (TUR)
2010 Bakü	Anzor Urishev (RUS)	Sharif Sharifov (AZE)	Stefan Gheorghita (ROU)
2010 Bakü	Anzor Urishev (RUS)	Sharif Sharifov (AZE)	Mikhail Ganev (BUL)
2011 Dortmund	Anzor Urishev (RUS)	Dato Marsagishvili (GEO)	Sharif Sharifov (AZE)
2011 Dortmund	Anzor Urishev (RUS)	Dato Marsagishvili (GEO)	Stefan Gheorghita (ROU)
2012 Belgrad	Dato Marsagishvili (GEO)	Mihail Ganev (BUL)	Anzor Urishev (RUS)
2012 Belgrad	Dato Marsagishvili (GEO)	Mihail Ganev (BUL)	Stefan Gheorghita (ROU)
2013 Tiflis	Dato Marsagishvili (GEO)	Musa Murtazaliev (ARM)	Ibragim Aldatov (UKR)
2013 Tiflis	Dato Marsagishvili (GEO)	Musa Murtazaliev (ARM)	Anzor Urishev (RUS)
2014 Vantaa	Abdulrashid Sadulaev (RUS)	Murad Gaidarov (BLR)	Musa Murtazaliev (ARM)
2014 Vantaa	Abdulrashid Sadulaev (RUS)	Murad Gaidarov (BLR)	István Veréb (HUN)
2015 Bakü	Abdulrashid Sadulaev (RUS)	Piotr Ianulov (MDA)	Radosław Marcinkiewicz (POL)
2015 Bakü	Abdulrashid Sadulaev (RUS)	Piotr Ianulov (MDA)	Sandro Aminashvili (GEO)
2016 Riga	Shamil Kudiyamagomedov (RUS)	Aleksander Gostiyev (AZE)	Dato Marsagishvili (GEO)
2016 Riga	Shamil Kudiyamagomedov (RUS)	Aleksander Gostiyev (AZE)	Ibragim Aldatov (UKR)
2017 Novi Sad	Dauren Kurugliev (RUS)	Aleksander Gostiyev (AZE)	Selim Yaşar (TUR)
2017 Novi Sad	Dauren Kurugliev (RUS)	Aleksander Gostiyev (AZE)	István Veréb (HUN)
2018 Kaspiysk	Artur Naifonov (RUS)	Aleksander Gostiyev (AZE)	Sandro Aminashvili (GEO)
2018 Kaspiysk	Artur Naifonov (RUS)	Aleksander Gostiyev (AZE)	Shamil Kudiyamagomedov (ITA)
2019 Bucharest	Vladislav Valiev (RUS)	Piotr Ianulov (MDA)	Fatih Erdin (TUR)
2019 Bucharest	Vladislav Valiev (RUS)	Piotr Ianulov (MDA)	Ali Shabanau (BLR)
2020 Rome	Artur Naifonov (RUS)	Myles Amine (SMR)	Boris Makoev (SVK)
2020 Rome	Artur Naifonov (RUS)	Myles Amine (SMR)	Rasul Tsikhayeu (BLR)
2021 Warsaw	Artur Naifonov (RUS)	Sandro Aminashvili (GEO)	Myles Amine (SMR)
2021 Warsaw	Artur Naifonov (RUS)	Sandro Aminashvili (GEO)	Ali Shabanau (BLR)
2022 Budapest	Myles Amine (SMR)	Abubakr Abakarov (AZE)	Osman Göçen (TUR)
2022 Budapest	Myles Amine (SMR)	Abubakr Abakarov (AZE)	Sebastian Jezierzański (POL)
2023 Zagreb	Dauren Kurugliev (GRE)	Myles Amine (SMR)	Abubakr Abakarov (AZE)
2023 Zagreb	Dauren Kurugliev (GRE)	Myles Amine (SMR)	Sebastian Jezierzański (POL)
2024 Bucharest	Dauren Kurugliev (GRE)	Myles Amine (SMR)	Osman Göçen (TUR)
2024 Bucharest	Dauren Kurugliev (GRE)	Myles Amine (SMR)	Arsenii Dzhioev (AZE)
2025 Bratislava	Magomed Ramazanov (BUL)	Mahamedkhabib Kadzimahamedau (UWW)	Osman Göçen (TUR)
2025 Bratislava	Magomed Ramazanov (BUL)	Mahamedkhabib Kadzimahamedau (UWW)	Artur Naifonov (UWW)

== Light heavyweight ==
- 87 kg: 1929–1949
- 97 kg: 1966–1968
- 90 kg: 1969–1995
- 92 kg: 2018–

Tournament	Gold	Silver	Bronze
1929 Paris	Erich Äschlimann (SUI)	Paul Bonnefont (FRA)	Joseph Van Assche (BEL)
1930 Brüksel	Sanfrid Söderqvist (SWE)	Bernard Deferm (BEL)	Van Der Sipp (FRA)
1931 Budapest	József Tunyogi (HUN)	Sanfrid Söderqvist (SWE)	Bernard Deferm (BEL)
1933 Paris	László Papp (HUN)	Henri Deniel (FRA)	Julien Cammaert (BEL)
1934 Stockholm	Knut Fridell (SWE)	Edvard Virág (HUN)	Karl Engelhardt (GER)
1935 Brüksel	Edvard Virág (HUN)	Axel Cadier (SWE)	August Neo (EST)
1937 Münih	Axel Cadier (SWE)	Paul Böhmer (GER)	József Palotás (HUN)
1946 Stockholm	Bengt Fahlkvist (SWE)	Fritz Stöckli (SUI)	Muharrem Candaş (TUR)
1949 İstanbul	Adil Candemir (TUR)	Viking Palm (SWE)	Nasır Yevd (IRN)
1966 Karlsruhe	Shota Lomidze (URS)	Ahmet Ayık (TUR)	József Csatári (HUN)
1967 İstanbul	Ahmet Ayık (TUR)	Shota Lomidze (URS)	Husni Husniev (BUL)
1968 Skopje	Vladimir Gulyutkin (URS)	Vasil Todorov (BUL)	Ryszard Długosz (HUN)
1969 Sofia	Gennadi Strahov (URS)	Attila Balogh (ROU)	Roland Andersson (SWE)
1970 East Berlin	Boris Gurevich (URS)	Károly Bajkó (HUN)	Ramadan Ahmedov (BUL)
1972 Katowice	Gennadi Strahov (URS)	Rusi Petrov (BUL)	Paweł Kurczewski (POL)
1973 Losanna	Piotr Surikov (URS)	Horst Stottmeister (GDR)	Dimo Kostov (BUL)
1974 Madrid	Levan Tediashvili (URS)	Paweł Kurczewski (POL)	Horst Stottmeister (GDR)
1975 Ludwigshafen	Horst Stottmeister (GDR)	Paweł Kurczewski (POL)	Piotr Surikov (URS)
1976 Leningrad	Levan Tediashvili (URS)	Peter Neumair (FRG)	Stelică Morcov (ROU)
1977 Bursa	Anatoliy Prokopçuk (URS)	Çukri Lutviyev (BUL)	İsmail Temiz (TUR)
1978 Sofia	Uwe Neupert (GDR)	Ivan Guinov (BUL)	Viktor Batniya (URS)
1979 Bucharest	Uwe Neupert (GDR)	Alash Daudov (URS)	Ivan Guinov (BUL)
1980 Prievidza	Sanasar Oganisyan (URS)	Uwe Neupert (GDR)	Christophe Andanson (FRA)
1981 Lodz	Uwe Neupert (GDR)	Gheorghe Broșteanu (ROU)	Viktor Batnia (URS)
1982 Varna	Ivan Guinov (BUL)	Piotr Naniyev (URS)	İsmail Temiz (TUR)
1983 Budapest	Piotr Naniyev (URS)	Gueorgui Yanchev (BUL)	Uwe Neupert (GDR)
1984 Jönköping	Vaja Yevloyev (URS)	İsmail Temiz (TUR)	Jan Górski (POL)
1985 Leipzig	Robert Tibilov (URS)	Iulian Risnoveanu (ROU)	Reşit Karabacak (TUR)
1986 Piraeus	Sanasar Oganisian (URS)	Gábor Tóth (HUN)	Torsten Wagner (GDR)
1987 Veliko Tarnovo	Makharbek Khadartsev (URS)	Efraim Kamberov (BUL)	Reşit Karabacak (TUR)
1988 Manchester	Vagab Kazibekov (URS)	Mehmet Türkkaya (TUR)	Gábor Tóth (HUN)
1989 Ankara	Vagab Kazibekov (URS)	Mehmet Türkkaya (TUR)	Dimitri Markov (BUL)
1990 Poznan	Vagab Kazibekov (URS)	Gábor Tóth (HUN)	Kenan Şimşek (TUR)
1991 Stuttgart	Makharbek Khadartsev (URS)	Gábor Tóth (HUN)	Efrahim Kamberoğlu (TUR)
1992 Kaposvár	Makharbek Khadartsev (CIS)	Gábor Tóth (HUN)	Kenan Şimşek (TUR)
1993 İstanbul	Dzhambolat Tedeyev (UKR)	Eldar Kurtanidze (GEO)	Kenan Şimşek (TUR)
1994 Rome	Soslan Fraev (RUS)	Vladimir Matyushenko (BLR)	Jozef Lohyňa (SVK)
1995 Fribourg	Makharbek Khadartsev (RUS)	Eldar Kurtanidze (GEO)	Sagid Murtazaliev (UKR)
2018 Kaspiysk	Abdulrashid Sadulaev (RUS)	Sharif Sharifov (AZE)	Serdar Böke (TUR)
2018 Kaspiysk	Abdulrashid Sadulaev (RUS)	Sharif Sharifov (AZE)	Kyrylo Mieshkov (UKR)
2019 Bucharest	Sharif Sharifov (AZE)	Zbigniew Baranowski (POL)	Irakli Mtsituri (GEO)
2019 Bucharest	Sharif Sharifov (AZE)	Zbigniew Baranowski (POL)	István Veréb (HUN)
2020 Rome	Süleyman Karadeniz (TUR)	Samuel Scherrer (SUI)	Aslanbek Alborov (AZE)
2020 Rome	Süleyman Karadeniz (TUR)	Samuel Scherrer (SUI)	Amarhajy Mahamedau (BLR)
2021 Warsaw	Magomed Kurbanov (RUS)	Samuel Scherrer (SUI)	Osman Nurmagomedov (AZE)
2021 Warsaw	Magomed Kurbanov (RUS)	Samuel Scherrer (SUI)	Gadzhi Radzhabov (BLR)
2022 Budapest	Feyzullah Aktürk (TUR)	Akhmed Bataev (BUL)	Osman Nurmagomedov (AZE)
2022 Budapest	Feyzullah Aktürk (TUR)	Akhmed Bataev (BUL)	Miriani Maisuradze (GEO)
2023 Zagreb	Feyzullah Aktürk (TUR)	Osman Nurmagomedov (AZE)	Ermak Kardanov (SVK)
2023 Zagreb	Feyzullah Aktürk (TUR)	Osman Nurmagomedov (AZE)	Miriani Maisuradze (GEO)
2024 Bucharest	Feyzullah Aktürk (TUR)	Boris Makoev (SVK)	Magomed Kurbanov (ANA)
2024 Bucharest	Feyzullah Aktürk (TUR)	Boris Makoev (SVK)	Miriani Maisuradze (GEO)
2025 Bratislava	Dauren Kurugliev (GRE)	Osman Nurmagomedov (AZE)	Miriani Maisuradze (GEO)
2025 Bratislava	Dauren Kurugliev (GRE)	Osman Nurmagomedov (AZE)	Feyzullah Aktürk (TUR)

== Heavyweight ==
- +87 kg: 1951–1961
- +97 kg: 1962–1967
- 100 kg: 1969–1995
- 97 kg: 1997–2001
- 96 kg: 2002–2013
- 97 kg: 2014–

Tournament	Gold	Silver	Bronze
1929 Paris	Johan Richthoff (SWE)	Edmond Charlier (BEL)	Edmond Dame (RFA)
1930 Brüksel	Johan Richthoff (SWE)	Edmond Charlier (BEL)	Not awarded
1931 Budapest	Willy Bürki (SUI)	Edmond Charlier (BEL)	József Varga (HUN)
1933 Paris	Willy Bürki (SUI)	Léon Charlier (BEL)	L. Ghevaert (RFA)
1934 Stockholm	Thure Sjöstedt (SWE)	Josef Klapuch (TCH)	Hjalmar Nyström (FIN)
1935 Brüksel	Karl Hegglin (SUI)	Kurt Hornfischer (GER)	Nils Åkerlindh (SWE)
1937 Münih	Kurt Hornfischer (GER)	Willy Lardon (SUI)	Gyula Bóbis (HUN)
1946 Stockholm	Bertil Antonsson (SWE)	Willy Lardon (SUI)	Mehmet Çoban (TUR)
1949 İstanbul	Bertil Antonsson (SWE)	Muharrem Candaş (TUR)	Natale Vecchi (ITA)
1966 Karlsruhe	Aleksandr Medved (URS)	Arne Robertsson (SWE)	Gıyasettin Yılmaz (TUR)
1967 İstanbul	Wilfried Dietrich (FRG)	Osman Duraliev (BUL)	Vladimir Saunin (URS)
1968 Skopje	Aleksandr Medved (URS)	Osman Duraliev (BUL)	László Nyers (HUN)
1969 Sofia	Vladimir Gulyutkin (URS)	Vasil Todorov (BUL)	Peter Germer (GDR)
1970 East Berlin	Ahmet Ayık (TUR)	Ivan Yarygin (URS)	Vasil Todorov (BUL)
1972 Katowice	Ivan Yarygin (URS)	Vasil Todorov (BUL)	Ștefan Stîngu (ROU)
1973 Losanna	Vladimir Gulyutkin (URS)	József Csatári (HUN)	Harald Büttner (GDR)
1974 Madrid	Harald Büttner (GDR)	Ivan Yarygin (URS)	Edward Żmudziejewski (POL)
1975 Ludwigshafen	Ivan Yarygin (URS)	Harald Büttner (GDR)	Dimo Kostov (BUL)
1976 Leningrad	Ivan Yarygin (URS)	Dimo Kostov (BUL)	Mehmet Güçlü (TUR)
1977 Bursa	Aslanbek Bisultanov (URS)	Mehmet Güçlü (TUR)	Harald Büttner (GDR)
1978 Sofia	Levan Tediashvili (URS)	Mehmet Güçlü (TUR)	Vasile Pușcașu (ROU)
1979 Bucharest	Ilya Mate (URS)	Slavcho Chervenkov (BUL)	Vasile Pușcașu (ROU)
1980 Prievidza	Magomed Magomedov (URS)	Slavcho Chervenkov (BUL)	Harald Büttner (GDR)
1981 Lodz	Magomed Magomedov (URS)	Tomasz Busse (POL)	Roland Gehrke (GDR)
1982 Varna	Bagrat Chutaba (URS)	Uwe Neupert (GDR)	Július Strnisko (TCH)
1983 Budapest	Magomed Magomedov (URS)	Roland Gehrke (GDR)	Július Strnisko (TCH)
1984 Jönköping	Magomed Magomedov (URS)	Uwe Neupert (GDR)	Tomasz Busse (POL)
1985 Leipzig	Leri Khabelov (URS)	Uwe Neupert (GDR)	Hayri Sezgin (TUR)
1986 Piraeus	Georgi Yanchev (BUL)	Aslan Khadartsev (URS)	Uwe Neupert (GDR)
1987 Veliko Tarnovo	Leri Khabelov (URS)	Vasile Pușcașu (ROU)	Gueorgui Yanchev (BUL)
1988 Manchester	Leri Khabelov (URS)	Noel Loban (GBR)	Uwe Neupert (GDR)
1989 Ankara	Arawat Sabejew (URS)	Hayri Sezgin (TUR)	Stoyan Nenchev (BUL)
1990 Poznan	Arawat Sabejew (URS)	Andrzej Radomski (POL)	Mahmut Demir (TUR)
1991 Stuttgart	Ali Kayalı (TUR)	Andrei Golovko (URS)	Heiko Balz (GER)
1992 Kaposvár	Leri Khabelov (CIS)	Heiko Balz (GER)	Ali Kayalı (TUR)
1993 İstanbul	Arawat Sabejew (GER)	Alexei Nechipurenko (UKR)	Ali Kayalı (TUR)
1994 Rome	Marek Garmulewicz (POL)	Heiko Balz (GER)	Ali Kayalı (TUR)
1995 Fribourg	David Musulbes (RUS)	Milan Mazáč (SVK)	Arawat Sabejew (GER)
1996 Budapest	Marek Garmulewicz (POL)	Milan Mazáč (SVK)	David Musulbes (RUS)
1997 Warsaw	Eldar Kurtanidze (GEO)	Marek Garmulewicz (POL)	Arawat Sabejew (GER)
1998 Bratislava	Eldar Kurtanidze (GEO)	Marek Garmulewicz (POL)	Aftantil Xanthopoulos (GRE)
1999 Minsk	Kuramagomed Kuramagomedov (RUS)	Vadim Tasoyev (UKR)	Eldar Kurtanidze (GEO)
2000 Budapest	Sagid Murtazaliev (RUS)	Arawat Sabejew (GER)	Vadim Tasoyev (UKR)
2001 Budapest	Eldar Kurtanidze (GEO)	Giorgi Gogshelidze (RUS)	Aleksandr Shemarov (BLR)
2002 Bakü	Kuramagomed Kuramagomedov (RUS)	Eldar Kurtanidze (GEO)	Fatih Çakıroğlu (TUR)
2003 Riga	Khadzhimurat Gatsalov (RUS)	Fatih Çakıroğlu (TUR)	Vadim Tasoyev (UKR)
2004 Ankara	Khadzhimurat Gatsalov (RUS)	Vadim Tasoyev (UKR)	Rustam Agaev (AZE)
2005 Varna	Eldar Kurtanidze (GEO)	Vincent Aka-Akesse (RFA)	Khadzhimurat Gatsalov (RUS)
2005 Varna	Eldar Kurtanidze (GEO)	Vincent Aka-Akesse (RFA)	Fatih Çakıroğlu (TUR)
2006 Moscow	Khadzhimurat Gatsalov (RUS)	Shamil Gitinov (ARM)	Giorgi Gogshelidze (GEO)
2006 Moscow	Khadzhimurat Gatsalov (RUS)	Shamil Gitinov (ARM)	Stefan Kehrer (GER)
2007 Sofia	Shirvani Muradov (RUS)	Ruslan Sheikhau (BLR)	Shamil Gitinov (ARM)
2007 Sofia	Shirvani Muradov (RUS)	Ruslan Sheikhau (BLR)	Giorgi Gogshelidze (GEO)
2008 Tampere	Giorgi Gogshelidze (GEO)	Georgi Tibilov (UKR)	Hakan Koç (TUR)
2008 Tampere	Giorgi Gogshelidze (GEO)	Georgi Tibilov (UKR)	Khadzhimurat Gatsalov (RUS)
2009 Vilnius	Khetag Gazyumov (AZE)	Georgy Ketoev (RUS)	Serhat Balcı (TUR)
2009 Vilnius	Khetag Gazyumov (AZE)	Georgy Ketoev (RUS)	Edgar Yenokyan (ARM)
2010 Bakü	Khetag Gazyumov (AZE)	Giorgi Gogshelidze (GEO)	Serhat Balcı (TUR)
2010 Bakü	Khetag Gazyumov (AZE)	Giorgi Gogshelidze (GEO)	Aliaksei Dubko (UKR)
2011 Dortmund	Khetag Gazyumov (AZE)	Vladislav Baitcaev (RUS)	Pavlo Oliinyk (UKR)
2011 Dortmund	Khetag Gazyumov (AZE)	Vladislav Baitcaev (RUS)	Nicolai Ceban (MDA)
2012 Belgrad	Abdusalam Gadisov (RUS)	Valerii Andriitsev (UKR)	Serhat Balcı (TUR)
2012 Belgrad	Abdusalam Gadisov (RUS)	Valerii Andriitsev (UKR)	Ivan Yankouski (BLR)
2013 Tiflis	Pavlo Oliinyk (UKR)	Kamil Skaskiewicz (POL)	Lyuben Iliev (BUL)
2013 Tiflis	Pavlo Oliinyk (UKR)	Kamil Skaskiewicz (POL)	Vladislav Baitcaev (RUS)
2014 Vantaa	Abdusalam Gadisov (RUS)	Khetag Gazyumov (AZE)	Ivan Yankouski (BLR)
2014 Vantaa	Abdusalam Gadisov (RUS)	Khetag Gazyumov (AZE)	Nicolai Ceban (MDA)
2015 Bakü	Khetag Gazyumov (AZE)	Elizbar Odikadze (GEO)	Valeriy Andriytsev (UKR)
2015 Bakü	Khetag Gazyumov (AZE)	Elizbar Odikadze (GEO)	Abdusalam Gadisov (RUS)
2016 Riga	Anzor Boltukaev (RUS)	Ivan Yankouski (BLR)	Erik Thiele (GER)
2016 Riga	Anzor Boltukaev (RUS)	Ivan Yankouski (BLR)	Elizbar Odikadze (GEO)
2017 Novi Sad	Rıza Yıldırım (TUR)	Aliaksandr Hushtyn (BLR)	Mihail Ganev (BUL)
2017 Novi Sad	Rıza Yıldırım (TUR)	Aliaksandr Hushtyn (BLR)	Elizbar Odikadze (GEO)
2018 Kaspiysk	Vladislav Baitcaev (RUS)	Aliaksandr Hushtyn (BLR)	Nurmagomed Gadzhiev (AZE)
2018 Kaspiysk	Vladislav Baitcaev (RUS)	Aliaksandr Hushtyn (BLR)	Elizbar Odikadze (GEO)
2019 Bucharest	Abdulrashid Sadulaev (RUS)	Aliaksandr Hushtyn (BLR)	Nurmagomed Gadzhiev (AZE)
2019 Bucharest	Abdulrashid Sadulaev (RUS)	Aliaksandr Hushtyn (BLR)	Elizbar Odikadze (GEO)
2020 Rome	Abdulrashid Sadulaev (RUS)	Albert Saritov (ROU)	Abraham Conyedo (ITA)
2020 Rome	Abdulrashid Sadulaev (RUS)	Albert Saritov (ROU)	Elizbar Odikadze (GEO)
2021 Warsaw	Alikhan Zhabrailov (RUS)	Süleyman Karadeniz (TUR)	Radosław Baran (POL)
2021 Warsaw	Alikhan Zhabrailov (RUS)	Süleyman Karadeniz (TUR)	Elizbar Odikadze (GEO)
2022 Budapest	Magomedkhan Magomedov (AZE)	Vladislav Baitcaev (HUN)	Zbigniew Baranowski (POL)
2022 Budapest	Magomedkhan Magomedov (AZE)	Vladislav Baitcaev (HUN)	Batyrbek Tsakulov (SVK)
2023 Zagreb	Givi Matcharashvili (GEO)	Magomedkhan Magomedov (AZE)	İbrahim Çiftçi (TUR)
2023 Zagreb	Givi Matcharashvili (GEO)	Magomedkhan Magomedov (AZE)	Vladislav Baitcaev (HUN)
2024 Bucharest	Givi Matcharashvili (GEO)	Magomedkhan Magomedov (AZE)	İbrahim Çiftçi (TUR)
2024 Bucharest	Givi Matcharashvili (GEO)	Magomedkhan Magomedov (AZE)	Vladislav Baitcaev (HUN)
2025 Bratislava	Givi Matcharashvili (GEO)	Magomed Kurbanov (UWW)	Richárd Végh (HUN)
2025 Bratislava	Givi Matcharashvili (GEO)	Magomed Kurbanov (UWW)	Batyrbek Tsakulov (SVK)

== Super heavyweight ==
- +100 kg: 1969–1983
- 130 kg: 1985–2001
- 120 kg: 2002–2013
- 125 kg: 2014–

Tournament	Gold	Silver	Bronze
1969 Sofia	Shota Lomidze (URS)	Osman Duraliev (BUL)	Ömer Topuz (TUR)
1970 East Berlin	Leonid Kitov (URS)	Gıyasettin Yılmaz (TUR)	Peter Germer (GDR)
1972 Katowice	Aleksandr Medved (URS)	Osman Duraliev (BUL)	Ștefan Stîngu (ROU)
1973 Losanna	Nodar Modebadze (URS)	Alaettin Yıldırım (TUR)	Boyan Boev (BUL)
1974 Madrid	Soslan Andiyev (URS)	Ladislau Șimon (ROU)	Heinz Eichelbaum (FRG)
1975 Ludwigshafen	Soslan Andiyev (URS)	József Balla (HUN)	Ladislau Șimon (ROU)
1976 Leningrad	Ladislau Șimon (ROU)	Roland Gehrke (GDR)	Boris Bigayev (URS)
1977 Bursa	Vladimir Parşukov (URS)	Marin Gerçev (BUL)	Petr Drozda (TCH)
1978 Sofia	Boris Bigayev (URS)	József Balla (HUN)	Marin Guerchev (BUL)
1979 Bucharest	Salman Hashimikov (URS)	Roland Gehrke (GDR)	Adam Sandurski (POL)
1980 Prievidza	Petar Ivanov (BUL)	Salman Hashimikov (URS)	Adam Sandurski (POL)
1981 Lodz	Salman Hashimikov (URS)	József Balla (HUN)	Adam Sandurski (POL)
1982 Varna	Soslan Andiyev (URS)	János Rovnyai (HUN)	Adam Sandurski (POL)
1983 Budapest	József Balla (HUN)	Nikola Slatev (BUL)	Boris Bigayev (URS)
1984 Jönköping	Not awarded	Salman Hashimikov; Soviet Union; Adam Sandurski; Poland	Andreas Schröder (GDR)
1985 Leipzig	David Gobejishvili (URS)	Atanas Atanasov (BUL)	Andreas Schröder (GDR)
1986 Piraeus	Andreas Schröder (GDR)	Maljaz Mermanishvili (URS)	Adam Sandurski (POL)
1987 Veliko Tarnovo	Zaza Turmanidze (URS)	Andreas Schröder (GDR)	Atanas Atanasov (BUL)
1988 Manchester	Aslan Khadartsev (URS)	Atanas Atanasov (BUL)	Andreas Schröder (GDR)
1989 Ankara	Aslan Khadartsev (URS)	Ayhan Taşkın (TUR)	Kiril Barbutov (BUL)
1990 Poznan	Andreas Schröder (GER)	Kiril Barbutov (BUL)	Andrey Shumilin (URS)
1991 Stuttgart	Andreas Schröder (GER)	Oleg Naniyev (URS)	Mahmut Demir (TUR)
1992 Kaposvár	Andreas Schröder (GER)	Mahmut Demir (TUR)	Kiril Barbutov (BUL)
1993 İstanbul	Mahmut Demir (TUR)	Merab Valiyev (UKR)	Guennadi Zhiltsov (RUS)
1994 Rome	Merab Valiyev (UKR)	Mahmut Demir (TUR)	Andrey Shumilin (RUS)
1995 Fribourg	Mahmut Demir (TUR)	Merab Valiyev (UKR)	Leri Khabelov (RUS)
1996 Budapest	Mahmut Demir (TUR)	Sven Thiele (GER)	Merab Valiyev (UKR)
1997 Warsaw	David Musulbes (RUS)	Aleksey Medvedev (BLR)	Sven Thiele (GER)
1998 Bratislava	Aydın Polatçı (TUR)	Milan Mazáč (SVK)	David Musulbes (RUS)
1999 Minsk	Andrey Shumilin (RUS)	Aydın Polatçı (TUR)	Sven Thiele (GER)
2000 Budapest	Marek Garmulewicz (POL)	David Musulbes (RUS)	Sven Thiele (GER)
2001 Budapest	David Musulbes (RUS)	Alex Modebadze (GEO)	Sven Thiele (GER)
2002 Bakü	David Musulbes (RUS)	Davit Otiasvili (GEO)	Zekeriya Güçlü (TUR)
2003 Riga	David Musulbes (RUS)	Serhii Priadun (UKR)	Alex Modebadze (GEO)
2004 Ankara	Aydın Polatçı (TUR)	Kuramagomed Kuramagomedov (RUS)	Serhii Priadun (UKR)
2005 Varna	Kuramagomed Kuramagomedov (RUS)	Vadim Tasoyev (UKR)	Efstathios Topalidis (GRE)
2005 Varna	Kuramagomed Kuramagomedov (RUS)	Vadim Tasoyev (UKR)	Ottó Aubéli (HUN)
2006 Moscow	Kuramagomed Kuramagomedov (RUS)	Ivan Ishchenko (UKR)	Eldar Kurtanidze (GEO)
2006 Moscow	Kuramagomed Kuramagomedov (RUS)	Ivan Ishchenko (UKR)	Rareș Chintoan (ROU)
2007 Sofia	Kuramagomed Kuramagomedov (RUS)	Serhii Priadun (UKR)	Alex Modebadze (GEO)
2007 Sofia	Kuramagomed Kuramagomedov (RUS)	Serhii Priadun (UKR)	Fatih Çakıroğlu (TUR)
2008 Tampere	David Musulbes (SVK)	Not awarded	Bakhtiyar Akhmedov (RUS)
2008 Tampere	David Musulbes (SVK)	Not awarded	Ali Isaev (AZE)
2009 Vilnius	Ali Isaev (AZE)	Ruslan Basiev (ARM)	Vasili Tismenetski (UKR)
2009 Vilnius	Ali Isaev (AZE)	Ruslan Basiev (ARM)	Recep Kara (TUR)
2010 Bakü	Beylal Makhov (RUS)	Fatih Çakıroğlu (TUR)	Aliaksei Shamarau (BLR)
2010 Bakü	Beylal Makhov (RUS)	Fatih Çakıroğlu (TUR)	Dimitar Kumchev (BUL)
2011 Dortmund	Fatih Çakıroğlu (TUR)	Alexei Shemarov (BLR)	Dániel Ligeti (HUN)
2011 Dortmund	Fatih Çakıroğlu (TUR)	Alexei Shemarov (BLR)	Jamaladdin Magomedov (AZE)
2012 Belgrad	Taha Akgül (TUR)	Dániel Ligeti (HUN)	Davit Modzmanashvili (GEO)
2012 Belgrad	Taha Akgül (TUR)	Dániel Ligeti (HUN)	Ihar Dziatko (BLR)
2013 Tiflis	Taha Akgül (TUR)	Alen Zasieiev (UKR)	Jamaladdin Magomedov (AZE)
2013 Tiflis	Taha Akgül (TUR)	Alen Zasieiev (UKR)	Geno Petriashvili (GEO)
2014 Vantaa	Taha Akgül (TUR)	Alan Khugaev (RUS)	Oleksandr Khotsianivskyi (UKR)
2014 Vantaa	Taha Akgül (TUR)	Alan Khugaev (RUS)	Dániel Ligeti (HUN)
2015 Baku	Taha Akgül (TUR)	Aliaksei Shamarau (BLR)	Geno Petriashvili (GEO)
2015 Baku	Taha Akgül (TUR)	Aliaksei Shamarau (BLR)	Jamaladdin Magomedov (AZE)
2016 Riga	Geno Petriashvili (GEO)	Robert Baran (POL)	Alexey Nikolaev (BLR)
2016 Riga	Geno Petriashvili (GEO)	Robert Baran (POL)	Alen Zasieiev (UKR)
2017 Novi Sad	Taha Akgül (TUR)	Jamaladdin Magomedov (AZE)	Geno Petriashvili (GEO)
2017 Novi Sad	Taha Akgül (TUR)	Jamaladdin Magomedov (AZE)	Levan Berianidze (ARM)
2018 Kaspiysk	Taha Akgül (TUR)	Geno Petriashvili (GEO)	Robert Baran (POL)
2018 Kaspiysk	Taha Akgül (TUR)	Geno Petriashvili (GEO)	Jamaladdin Magomedov (AZE)
2019 Bucharest	Taha Akgül (TUR)	Geno Petriashvili (GEO)	Anzor Khizriev (RUS)
2019 Bucharest	Taha Akgül (TUR)	Geno Petriashvili (GEO)	Oleksandr Khotsianivskyi (UKR)
2020 Rome	Geno Petriashvili (GEO)	Robert Baran (POL)	Jamaladdin Magomedov (AZE)
2020 Rome	Geno Petriashvili (GEO)	Robert Baran (POL)	Baldan Tsyzhipov (RUS)
2021 Warsaw	Taha Akgül (TUR)	Sergey Kozyrev (RUS)	Geno Petriashvili (GEO)
2021 Warsaw	Taha Akgül (TUR)	Sergey Kozyrev (RUS)	Oleksandr Khotsianivskyi (UKR)
2022 Budapest	Taha Akgül (TUR)	Geno Petriashvili (GEO)	Robert Baran (POL)
2022 Budapest	Taha Akgül (TUR)	Geno Petriashvili (GEO)	Dániel Ligeti (HUN)
2023 Zagreb	Taha Akgül (TUR)	Geno Petriashvili (GEO)	Giorgi Meshvildishvili (AZE)
2023 Zagreb	Taha Akgül (TUR)	Geno Petriashvili (GEO)	Dániel Ligeti (HUN)
2024 Bucharest	Taha Akgül (TUR)	Geno Petriashvili (GEO)	Giorgi Meshvildishvili (AZE)
2024 Bucharest	Taha Akgül (TUR)	Geno Petriashvili (GEO)	Alen Khubulov (BUL)
2025 Bucharest	Giorgi Meshvildishvili (AZE)	Solomon Manashvili (GEO)	Dzianis Khramiankou (UWW)
2025 Bucharest	Giorgi Meshvildishvili (AZE)	Solomon Manashvili (GEO)	Kamil Kościółek (POL)

== All time medal table ==
As of 2025 European Wrestling Championships

Rank	Nation	Gold	Silver	Bronze	Total
1	Soviet Union	131	51	33	215
2	Russia	104	29	48	181
3	Bulgaria	71	73	81	225
4	Turkey	61	64	87	212
5	Azerbaijan	30	28	50	108
6	Germany	25	33	35	93
7	Georgia	22	30	55	107
8	Hungary	20	40	42	102
9	Ukraine	19	26	46	91
10	Sweden	16	17	12	45
11	East Germany	12	27	32	71
12	Armenia	11	16	16	43
13	Switzerland	8	11	8	27
14	Italy	6	6	9	21
15	Slovakia	6	5	9	20
16	Poland	5	21	50	76
17	Finland	5	8	7	20
–	United World Wrestling	5	3	3	11
18	Belgium	4	10	3	17
19	Greece	4	4	8	16
20	Yugoslavia	4	4	5	13
21	CIS	4	2	1	7
22	Romania	3	26	33	62
23	France	3	13	17	33
24	Belarus	2	25	26	53
25	Moldova	2	4	11	17
26	Albania	2	3	2	7
–	Individual Neutral Athletes (Note: At the 2024 European Championships, in accordance with sanctions imposed following by the 2022 Russian invasion of Ukraine, wrestlers from Russia and Belarus were not permitted to use the name, flag, or anthem of Russia or Belarus. They instead participated as "Individual Neutral Athletes (AIN)", their medals were not included in the official medal table.)	2	2	2	6
27	North Macedonia	2	0	5	7
28	Czechoslovakia	1	4	8	13
29	San Marino	1	3	1	5
30	Iran	0	4	1	5
31	Great Britain	0	2	2	4
32	Serbia	0	1	3	4
33	Israel	0	1	1	2
33	Latvia	0	1	1	2
35	Austria	0	0	2	2
35	Egypt	0	0	2	2
37	Denmark	0	0	1	1
37	Estonia	0	0	1	1
37	Slovenia	0	0	1	1
37	Spain	0	0	1	1
Totals (40 entries)		591	597	761	1,949

- Names in italic are national entities that no longer exist.
