= 1930 European Wrestling Championships =

- Host city: Belgium Brussels, Freestyle; Sweden Stockholm, Greco-Roman
- Dates: 8 – 10 May 1930; 1 – 3 March 1930

Champions
- Freestyle: Belgium
- Greco-Roman: Sweden

The 1930 European Wrestling Championships were held in the men's Freestyle style in Brussels 8 – 10 May 1930; the Greco-Romane style and in Stockholm 1 – 3 March 1930.

== Medal table ==
Rank	Nation	Gold	Silver	Bronze	Total
1	Sweden	6	2	3	11
2	Finland	3	1	1	5
3	Belgium	2	4	0	6
4	Hungary	2	2	3	7
5	Switzerland	1	1	0	2
6	Germany	0	1	2	3
7	Estonia	0	1	1	2
8	Denmark	0	1	0	1
8	Norway	0	1	0	1
10	France	0	0	3	3
Totals (10 entries)		14	14	13	41

== Medal summary ==
=== Men's freestyle ===
Event	Gold	Silver	Bronze
56 kg	Piet Mollin; Belgium	Pál Gyarmati; Hungary	John Björnsson; Sweden
61 kg	József Tasnádi; Hungary	François Van Langenhove; Belgium	Jean Chasson; France
66 kg	Károly Kárpáti; Hungary	Englebert Mollin; Belgium	Erik Malmberg; Sweden
72 kg	Hyacinthe Roosen; Belgium	Fritz Käsermann; Switzerland	Algot Malmberg; Sweden
79 kg	Hermann Gehri; Switzerland	Nils Landberg; Sweden	Émile Poilvé; France
87 kg	Sanfrid Söderqvist; Sweden	Bernard Deferm; Belgium	van der Sipp; France
87+ kg	Johan Richthoff; Sweden	Edmond Charlier; Belgium	- [[|]]

=== Men's Greco-Roman ===
Event	Gold	Silver	Bronze
56 kg	Herman Tuvesson; Sweden	Jakob Brendel; Germany	László Szekfű; Hungary
61 kg	Kustaa Pihlajamäki; Finland	Sven Martinsen; Norway	Ödön Zombori; Hungary
66 kg	Erik Malmberg; Sweden	Voldemar Väli; Estonia	Károly Kárpáti; Hungary
72 kg	Mikko Nordling; Finland	Gyula Zombori; Hungary	Jean Földeak; Germany
79 kg	Väinö Kokkinen; Finland	Ivar Johansson; Sweden	Karl Kullisaar; Estonia
87 kg	Carl Westergren; Sweden	Ejnar Hansen; Denmark	Edil Rosenqvist; Finland
87+ kg	Johan Richthoff; Sweden	Hjalmar Nyström; Finland	Georg Gehring; Germany
