= 1929 European Championship =

1929 European Championship can refer to:

- 1929 Ice Hockey European Championship
- 1929 European Wrestling Championships
- 1929 European Figure Skating Championships
- 1929 European Rowing Championships
