= 1967 European Wrestling Championships =

- Host city: Istanbul, Turkey Freestyle; Minsk, Soviet Union Greco-Roman
- Dates: 7–10 July 1967; 19–22 May 1967

Champions
- Freestyle: Turkey
- Greco-Roman: Soviet Union

The 1967 European Wrestling Championships were held in the Greco-Romane style in Minsk on 19–22 May 1967, with the men's Freestyle style in Istanbul on 7–10 July 1967.

== Medal table ==
| Rank | Nation | Gold | Silver | Bronze | Total |
|---|---|---|---|---|---|
| 1 | Soviet Union | 5 | 5 | 3 | 13 |
| 2 | Turkey | 5 | 1 | 0 | 6 |
| 3 | Hungary | 3 | 0 | 1 | 4 |
| 4 | Bulgaria | 1 | 4 | 3 | 8 |
| 5 | Romania | 1 | 2 | 3 | 6 |
| 6 | West Germany | 1 | 0 | 1 | 2 |
| 7 | East Germany | 0 | 2 | 2 | 4 |
| 8 | Sweden | 0 | 1 | 1 | 2 |
| 9 | Finland | 0 | 1 | 0 | 1 |
| 10 | Czechoslovakia | 0 | 0 | 2 | 2 |
| Totals (10 entries) | | 16 | 16 | 16 | 48 |

== Medal summary ==
=== Men's freestyle ===
| Event | Gold | Silver | Bronze |
|---|---|---|---|
| 52 kg | Mehmet Esenceli; Turkey | Bayu Baev; Bulgaria | Jürgen Kalkowski; East Germany |
| 57 kg | Hasan Sevinç; Turkey | Yancho Patrikov; Bulgaria} | Niculae Cristea; Romania |
| 63 kg | Nihat Kabanlı; Turkey | Mladen Gueorguiev; Bulgaria | Petre Coman; Romania |
| 70 kg | Zarbeg Beriashvili; Soviet Union | Jan Karlsson; Sweden | Enyu Valchev; Bulgaria |
| 78 kg | Yury Shakhmuradov; Soviet Union | Mahmut Atalay; Turkey | Károly Bajkó; Hungary |
| 87 kg | Boris Gurevich; Soviet Union | Francisc Balla; Romania | Prodan Gardzhev; Bulgaria |
| 97 kg | Ahmet Ayık; Turkey | Shota Lomidze; Soviet Union | Chusni Jusniev; Bulgaria |
| 97+ kg | Wilfried Dietrich; West Germany | Osman Duraliev; Bulgaria | Vladimir Saunin; Soviet Union |

=== Men's Greco-Roman ===
| Event | Gold | Silver | Bronze |
|---|---|---|---|
| 52 kg | Petar Kirov; Bulgaria | Sergei Rybalko; Soviet Union | Rolf Lacour; West Germany |
| 57 kg | János Varga; Hungary | Hartmut Puls; East Germany | Rustam Kazakov; Soviet Union |
| 63 kg | Simion Popescu; Romania | Sergei Agamov; Soviet Union | Jiří Švec; Czechoslovakia |
| 70 kg | Gennady Sapunov; Soviet Union | Eero Tapio; Finland | Klaus-Jürgen Pohl; East Germany |
| 78 kg | Sırrı Acar; Turkey | Ion Ţăranu; Romania | Georgy Vershinin; Soviet Union |
| 87 kg | Aleksandr Yurkevich; Soviet Union | Lothar Metz; West Germany | Gheorghe Popovici; Romania |
| 97 kg | Ferenc Kiss; Hungary | Vasili Merkulov; Soviet Union | Pelle Svensson; Sweden |
| 97+ kg | István Kozma; Hungary | Nikolai Shmakov; Soviet Union | Petr Kment; Czechoslovakia |
