= 1929 European Wrestling Championships =

- Host city: Freestyle: Paris; Greco-Roman: Dortmund
- Dates: 14 – 16 February 1929; 3 – 5 April 1929

Champions
- Freestyle: Sweden
- Greco-Roman: Sweden

The 1929 European Wrestling Championships were held in the men's Freestyle style in Paris 14 - 16 February 1929; the Greco-Romane style and in Dortmund 3 - 5 April 1929.

== Medal table ==
Rank	Nation	Gold	Silver	Bronze	Total
1	Sweden	4	3	2	9
2	Belgium	2	2	1	5
3	Germany	2	1	0	3
4	France	1	2	2	5
5	Switzerland	1	1	3	5
6	Finland	1	1	0	2
6	Hungary	1	1	0	2
8	Norway	1	0	0	1
9	Denmark	0	2	0	2
10	Czechoslovakia	0	0	3	3
11	Great Britain	0	0	1	1
11	Italy	0	0	1	1
Totals (12 entries)		13	13	13	39

== Medal summary ==
=== Men's freestyle ===
Event	Gold	Silver	Bronze
56 kg	Piet Mollin; Belgium	Berthaux; France	R. Wyss; Switzerland
61 kg	René Rottenfluc; France	Joseph Dillen; Belgium	Denis Perret; Switzerland
66 kg	Erik Malmberg; Sweden	Károly Kárpáti; Hungary	Reginald Edwards; Great Britain
72 kg	Hyacinthe Roosen; Belgium	Alvar Eriksson; Sweden	Fritz Käsermann; Switzerland
79 kg	Sanfrid Söderqvist; Sweden	Hans Mollet; Switzerland	Henri Deniel; France
87 kg	Erich Äschlimann; Switzerland	Paul Bonnefont; France	Joseph Van Assche; Belgium
87+ kg	Johan Richthoff; Sweden	Edmond Charlier; Belgium	Edmond Dame; France

=== Men's Greco-Roman ===
Event	Gold	Silver	Bronze
58 kg	Sven Martinsen; Norway	Erland Nielsen; Denmark	Antonín Nič; Czechoslovakia
62 kg	Folke Hernström; Sweden	Aage Torgensen; Denmark	Eugen Fleischmann; Czechoslovakia
67.5 kg	Eduard Sperling; Germany	Torsten Bergström; Sweden	Silvio Tozzi; Italy
75 kg	József Tunyogi; Hungary	Väinö Kokkinen; Finland	Ivar Johansson; Sweden
82.5 kg	Onni Pellinen; Finland	Robert Rupp; Germany	Sanfried Söderqvist; Sweden
82.5+ kg	Georg Gehring; Germany	Rudolf Svensson; Sweden	Josef Urban; Czechoslovakia
