= Jan Szymański =

Jan Szymański may refer to:

- Jan Szymański (wrestler) (1960–2005), Polish Olympic wrestler
- Jan Szymański (speed skater) (born 1989), Polish long track speed skater
