= 1986 European Wrestling Championships =

- Host city: Greece, Piraeus
- Dates: 14 – 20 April 1986

Champions
- Freestyle: Soviet Union
- Greco-Roman: Soviet Union

The 1986 European Wrestling Championships was held from 14 to 20 April 1986 in Piraeus, Greece.

== Medal table ==
Rank	Nation	Gold	Silver	Bronze	Total
1	Soviet Union	10	5	2	17
2	Bulgaria	6	4	1	11
3	Hungary	2	1	1	4
4	East Germany	1	1	2	4
5	Yugoslavia	1	1	0	2
6	Romania	0	2	2	4
7	Sweden	0	2	1	3
8	Poland	0	1	5	6
9	Austria	0	1	0	1
9	Greece	0	1	0	1
9	West Germany	0	1	0	1
12	Finland	0	0	2	2
13	Czechoslovakia	0	0	1	1
13	Italy	0	0	1	1
13	Norway	0	0	1	1
13	Switzerland	0	0	1	1
Totals (16 entries)		20	20	20	60

== Medal summary ==
=== Men's freestyle ===
Event	Gold	Silver	Bronze
48 kg	Aleksandr Dorzhu; Soviet Union	Reiner Heugabel; West Germany	Alin Romulus Păcurar; Romania
52 kg	Valentin Yordanov; Bulgaria	Shaban Tërstena; Yugoslavia	Minatula Daibov; Soviet Union
57 kg	Georgi Kalchev; Bulgaria	Ruslan Karayev; Soviet Union	Zygmunt Kołodziej; Poland
62 kg	Jazar Isayev; Soviet Union	Valentin Savov; Bulgaria	Marian Skubacz; Poland
68 kg	Abdula Magomedov; Soviet Union	Simeon Shterev Sr. Bulgaria	Jan Szymański; Poland
74 kg	Adlan Varayev; Soviet Union	Claudiu Tămăduianu; Romania	Kemal Padarev; Bulgaria
82 kg	Aleksandar Nanev; Bulgaria	Vagab Kazibekov; Soviet Union	Jozef Lohyňa; Czechoslovakia
90 kg	Sanasar Oganisian; Soviet Union	Gábor Tóth; Hungary	Torsten Wagner; East Germany
100 kg	Georgi Yanchev; Bulgaria	Aslan Khadartsev; Soviet Union	Uwe Neupert; East Germany
130 kg	Andreas Schröder; East Germany	Maljaz Mermanishvili; Soviet Union	Adam Sandurski; Poland

=== Men's Greco-Roman ===
Event	Gold	Silver	Bronze
48 kg	Ivan Samtayev; Soviet Union	Bratan Tsenov; Bulgaria	Vincenzo Maenza; Italy
52 kg	Sergey Didiayev; Soviet Union	Mihai Cișmașu; Romania	Jon Rønningen; Norway
57 kg	Timerzian Kalimulin; Soviet Union	Jarálambos Jolidis; Greece	Keijo Pehkonen; Finland
62 kg	Árpád Sipos; Hungary	Benni Ljungbeck; Sweden	Hugo Dietsche; Switzerland
68 kg	Levon Julfalakyan; Soviet Union	Rumen Tenev; Bulgaria	Stanisław Barej; Poland
74 kg	Mikhail Mamiashvili; Soviet Union	Roger Tallroth; Sweden	Jouko Salomäki; Finland
82 kg	Tibor Komáromi; Hungary	Bogdan Daras; Poland	Teimuraz Apjazava; Soviet Union
90 kg	Atanas Komchev; Bulgaria	Franz Pitschmann; Austria	Ilie Matei; Romania
100 kg	Jožef Tertelj; Yugoslavia	Thomas Horschel; East Germany	Istaván Illés; Hungary
130 kg	Nikola Dinev; Bulgaria	Nikolay Makarenko; Soviet Union	Tomas Johansson; Sweden
