= 1966 European Wrestling Championships =

- Host city: West Germany, Karlsruhe, Freestyle; West Germany Essen, Greco-Roman
- Dates: 05 – 08 May 1966; 13 - 16 May 1966

Champions
- Freestyle: Soviet Union
- Greco-Roman: Soviet Union

The 1966 European Wrestling Championships were held in the Greco-Romane style and in Essen 13 - 16 May 1966; the men's Freestyle style in Karlsruhe 05 – 08 May 1966.

== Medal table ==
Rank	Nation	Gold	Silver	Bronze	Total
1	Soviet Union	10	3	1	14
2	Turkey	3	3	4	10
3	West Germany	1	1	0	2
4	Romania	1	0	2	3
5	East Germany	1	0	0	1
6	Bulgaria	0	2	2	4
6	Sweden	0	2	2	4
8	Hungary	0	2	1	3
9	Czechoslovakia	0	1	1	2
9	Yugoslavia	0	1	1	2
11	Finland	0	1	0	1
12	Belgium	0	0	1	1
12	Poland	0	0	1	1
Totals (13 entries)		16	16	16	48

== Medal summary ==
=== Men's freestyle ===
Event	Gold	Silver	Bronze
52 kg	Mehmet Esenceli; Turkey	Paul Neff; West Germany	Lesław Kropp; Poland
57 kg	Aydin Ibrahimov; Soviet Union	Yancho Patrikov; Bulgaria}	Hasan Sevinç; Turkey
63 kg	Yelkan Tedeyev; Soviet Union	Enyu Todorov; Bulgaria	Nihat Kabanlı; Turkey
70 kg	Zarbeg Beriashvili; Soviet Union	Seyit Ahmet Ağralı; Turkey	Stoyan Bimbalov; Bulgaria
78 kg	Yury Shakhmuradov; Soviet Union	Mahmut Atalay; Turkey	Turan Aladzhikov; Bulgaria
87 kg	Hasan Güngör; Turkey	Josef Urban; Czechoslovakia	Andrei Tsjovrebov; Soviet Union
97 kg	Shota Lomidze; Soviet Union	Ahmet Ayık; Turkey	József Csatári; Hungary
97+ kg	Aleksandr Medved; Soviet Union	Arne Robertsson; Sweden	Gıyasettin Yılmaz; Turkey

=== Men's Greco-Roman ===
Event	Gold	Silver	Bronze
52 kg	Vladimir Bakulin; Soviet Union	Boško Marinko; Yugoslavia	Maurice Mewis; Belgium
57 kg	Fritz Stange; West Germany	Armais Sayadov; Soviet Union	Ion Baciu; Romania
63 kg	Sergey Agamov; Soviet Union	Leif Freij; Sweden	Simion Popescu; Romania
70 kg	Klaus Pohl; East Germany	Antal Steer; Hungary	Branislav Martinović; Yugoslavia
78 kg	Vladislav Ivlev; Soviet Union	Martti Laakso; Finland	Ali Kazan; Turkey
87 kg	Tevfik Kış; Turkey	Anatoly Kirov; Soviet Union	Stig Persson; Sweden
97 kg	Nicolae Martinescu; Romania	Alexei Karmatski; Soviet Union	Pelle Svensson; Sweden
97+ kg	Anatoly Roshchin; Soviet Union	István Kozma; Hungary	Petr Kment; Czechoslovakia
