= 1983 European Wrestling Championships =

Sport event 1983

- Host city: Hungary, Budapest
- Dates: 17 – 24 April 1983

Champions
- Freestyle: Bulgaria
- Greco-Roman: Bulgaria

The 1983 European Wrestling Championships was held from 17 to 24 April 1983 in Budapest, Hungary.

== Medal table ==
| Rank | Nation | Gold | Silver | Bronze | Total |
|---|---|---|---|---|---|
| 1 | Bulgaria | 10 | 4 | 0 | 14 |
| 2 | Soviet Union | 5 | 4 | 8 | 17 |
| 3 | Hungary | 3 | 3 | 2 | 8 |
| 4 | Turkey | 1 | 1 | 0 | 2 |
| 4 | Yugoslavia | 1 | 1 | 0 | 2 |
| 6 | Poland | 0 | 2 | 4 | 6 |
| 7 | Romania | 0 | 2 | 2 | 4 |
| 8 | East Germany | 0 | 1 | 1 | 2 |
| 8 | Finland | 0 | 1 | 1 | 2 |
| 10 | Greece | 0 | 1 | 0 | 1 |
| 11 | Czechoslovakia | 0 | 0 | 2 | 2 |
| Totals (11 entries) | | 20 | 20 | 20 | 60 |

== Medal summary ==
=== Men's freestyle ===
| Event | Gold | Silver | Bronze |
|---|---|---|---|
| 48 kg | Ali Mejmedov; Bulgaria | László Bíró; Hungary | Jan Falandys; Poland |
| 52 kg | Valentin Yordanov; Bulgaria | Shaban Tërstena; Yugoslavia | Władysław Stecyk; Poland |
| 57 kg | Stefan Ivanov; Bulgaria | Ruslan Karayev; Soviet Union | Jozef Schwendtner; Czechoslovakia |
| 62 kg | Simeon Shterev Sr. Bulgaria | Ivan Grigoriev; Soviet Union | József Orbán; Hungary |
| 68 kg | Kamen Penev; Bulgaria | Fevzi Şeker; Turkey | David Guigauri; Soviet Union |
| 74 kg | Shaban Sejdiu; Yugoslavia | Pekka Rauhala; Finland | Vladimir Dzugutov; Soviet Union |
| 82 kg | Reşit Karabacak; Turkey | Efraim Kamberov; Bulgaria | Gueorgui Makasarishvili; Soviet Union |
| 90 kg | Piotr Naniyev; Soviet Union | Gueorgui Yanchev; Bulgaria | Uwe Neupert; East Germany |
| 100 kg | Magomed Magomedov; Soviet Union | Roland Gehrke; East Germany | Július Strnisko; Czechoslovakia |
| +100 kg | József Balla; Hungary | Nikola Slatev; Bulgaria | Boris Bigayev; Soviet Union |

=== Men's Greco-Roman ===
| Event | Gold | Silver | Bronze |
|---|---|---|---|
| 48 kg | Bratan Tsenov; Bulgaria | Vasili Anikin; Soviet Union | Csaba Vadász; Hungary |
| 52 kg | Lajos Rácz; Hungary | Sergey Diudiayev; Soviet Union | Roman Kierpacz; Poland |
| 57 kg | Emil Ivanov; Bulgaria | Charalambos Cholidis; Greece | Vasili Fomin; Soviet Union |
| 62 kg | Zhivko Vangelov; Bulgaria | Constantin Uță; Romania | Aleksandr Litvinov; Soviet Union |
| 68 kg | Guennadi Ermilov; Soviet Union | Jerzy Kopański; Poland | Tapio Sipilä; Finland |
| 74 kg | Ferenc Kocsis; Hungary | Andrzej Supron; Poland | Ştefan Rusu; Romania |
| 82 kg | Teimuraz Apkhazava; Soviet Union | Ion Draica; Romania | Andrzej Malina; Poland |
| 90 kg | Igor Kanygin; Soviet Union | Atanas Komchev; Bulgaria | Ilie Matei; Romania |
| 100 kg | Andrey Dimitrov; Bulgaria | Tamás Gáspár; Hungary | Viktor Avdyshev; Soviet Union |
| +100 kg | Nikola Dinev; Bulgaria | József Nagy; Hungary | Yevgueni Artiujin; Soviet Union |
