= 1984 European Wrestling Championships =

- Host city: Sweden, Jönköping
- Dates: 26 – 30 April 1984

Champions
- Freestyle: Soviet Union
- Greco-Roman: Soviet Union

The 1984 European Wrestling Championships was held from 26 to 30 April 1984 in Jönköping, Sweden.

== Medal table ==
Rank	Nation	Gold	Silver	Bronze	Total
1	Soviet Union	12	3	5	20
2	Bulgaria	4	4	7	15
3	Hungary	1	1	1	3
4	Sweden	1	0	0	1
4	Yugoslavia	1	0	0	1
6	Poland	0	3	2	5
7	East Germany	0	3	1	4
8	West Germany	0	3	0	3
9	Romania	0	2	1	3
10	Great Britain	0	1	0	1
10	Italy	0	1	0	1
10	Turkey	0	1	0	1
13	Finland	0	0	1	1
13	Greece	0	0	1	1
Totals (14 entries)		19	22	19	60

== Medal summary ==
=== Men's freestyle ===
Event	Gold	Silver	Bronze
48 kg	Sergey Kornilayev; Soviet Union	László Bíró; Hungary	Adem Hasanov; Bulgaria
52 kg	Shaban Tërstena; Yugoslavia	Valentin Yordanov; Bulgaria	Rajim Navrusov; Soviet Union
57 kg	Sergei Beloglazov; Soviet Union	Brian Aspen; Great Britain	Gueorgui Kalchev; Bulgaria
62 kg	Simeon Shterev Sr. Bulgaria	Viktor Alexeyev; Soviet Union	József Orbán; Hungary
68 kg	Arsen Fadzayev; Soviet Union	Jan Szymański; Poland	Kamen Penev; Bulgaria
74 kg	Taram Magomadov; Soviet Union	Martin Knosp; West Germany	Kemal Padarev; Bulgaria
82 kg	Efraim Kamberov; Bulgaria	Reiner Trik; West Germany	Lukman Zhabrailov; Soviet Union
90 kg	Vaja Yevloyev; Soviet Union	İsmail Temiz; Turkey	Jan Górski; Poland
100 kg	Magomed Magomedov; Soviet Union	Uwe Neupert; East Germany	Tomasz Busse; Poland
+100 kg	— Salman Hashimikov and Adam Sandurski met in the final, at the end of the fight and after not scoring any of the two points, the judges decided not to award the gold medal, leaving the two with the silver medal.	Salman Hashimikov; Soviet Union; Adam Sandurski; Poland	Andreas Schröder; East Germany

=== Men's Greco-Roman ===
Event	Gold	Silver	Bronze
48 kg	Maguiatdin Alajverdiyev; Soviet Union	Vincenzo Maenza; Italy; Ortse Ortsev; Bulgaria	—
52 kg	Minseit Tazetdinov; Soviet Union	Mihai Cişmaşu; Romania	Velin Dogandzhidski; Bulgaria
57 kg	Kamil Fatkulin; Soviet Union	Pasquale Passarelli; West Germany	Petar Balov; Bulgaria
62 kg	Kamandar Madzhidov; Soviet Union	Günter Reichelt; East Germany	Constantin Uță; Romania
68 kg	Mihail Prokudin; Soviet Union	Ștefan Negrișan; Romania	Panayot Kirov; Bulgaria
74 kg	Roger Tallroth; Sweden	Borislav Velichkov; Bulgaria	Mikhail Mamiashvili; Soviet Union
82 kg	Teimuraz Apjazava; Soviet Union	Anguel Bonchev; Bulgaria	Jarmo Övermark; Finland
90 kg	Atanas Komchev; Bulgaria	Igor Kanygin; Soviet Union	Yeoryos Pozidis; Greece
100 kg	Tamás Gáspár; Hungary	Thomas Horschel; East Germany	Nikolay Balboshin; Soviet Union
130 kg	Aleksandar Tomov; Bulgaria	Henryk Tomanek; Poland	Igor Rostorotski; Soviet Union
