= Khazar Isayev =

Soviet wrestler (born 1963)

Personal information
- Native name: Хазар Агаали оглу Исаев Xəzər Ağaəli oğlu İsayev
- Born: February 1, 1963 (age 63) Agdash, Azerbaijan
Medal record
Men's freestyle wrestling
Representing the Soviet Union
World Championships
Gold medal – first place	1986 Budapest	62 kg
Silver medal – second place	1987 Lørenskog	62 kg
European Championships
Gold medal – first place	1986 Tarnovo	62kg
Gold medal – first place	1987 Thessaloniki	62 kg

Khazar Agaali oglu Isayev (Russian: Хазар Агаали оглу Исаев; Azerbaijani: Xəzər Ağaəli oğlu İsayev; born 1 February 1963, in Agdash, Azerbaijan) is a former Soviet wrestler, world and European champion in freestyle wrestling. He is of Azerbaijani descent.
