= Karl Kullisaar =

Estonian wrestler

Karl Kullisaar (16 November 1905 – 1 March 1942) was an Estonian wrestler and sports figure.

He was born in Salla Rural Municipality, Virumaa.

He started his wrestling exercising in Tallinna Kalev. He won bronze medal at 1930 European Wrestling Championships. 1930–1938 he won 8 times Estonian wrestling championships.

He was also a sport coach.

Following the Soviet occupation of the Estonia in 1940, Kullisaar was arrested by the NKVD on 24 December 1940 in Tallinn. He died at the Unzhlag prison camp, Gorky Oblast, Russian Soviet Federative Socialist Republic.
