= Nasuh Akar =

Turkish freestyle wrestler

Personal information
- Nationality: Turkish
- Born: 10 May 1925 Yozgat, Turkey
- Died: 18 May 1984 (aged 59) Konya, Turkey

Sport
- Sport: Wrestling
- Event: Freestyle
Medal record
Men's freestyle wrestling
Representing Turkey
Olympic Games
Gold medal – first place	1948 London	57 kg
World Championships
Gold medal – first place	1951 Helsinki	57 kg
European Championships
Gold medal – first place	1949 Istanbul	57 kg
Silver medal – second place	1946 Stockholm	57 kg

Nasuh Akar (10 May 1925 – 18 May 1984) was a Turkish sports wrestler, who won the gold medal in the Bantamweight class of Men's Freestyle category at the 1948 Olympics.

== Wrestling career ==
He was born in the village Yiğitler of Boğazlıyan district of Yozgat Province. He attended primary school in his village. He completed his secondary and high school education at Eskişehir State Railways School. He started wrestling as a teenager and developed into an excellent freestyle wrestler. In 1946, he participated in the first international wrestling championship held after World War II, the European Free Style Championship in Stockholm. There, things were quite turbulent in the bantamweight division, in which Nasuh competed, as four wrestlers defeated each other. Nasuh Akar managed to beat the Finnish champion Erkki Johansson and the Hungarian champion Lajos Bencze, among others, while he lost on points to the two-time European vice-champion from 1938 and 1939 Kurt Pettersén from Sweden. In the final standings Bencze won ahead of Akar, Johansson and Pettersén.

In 1948 Nasuh achieved the greatest success of his wrestling career. He became the Olympic bantamweight champion in London. This victory was achieved very confidently, because Nasuh scored four shoulder and two point victories. Following his gold medal win at the 1948 London Olympics, Nasuh Akar became European and World champion.

Nasuh was also victorious at the 1949 European Championship, which took place in Istanbul. He won the four fights he had to fight without any problems. In the final fight he also managed to take revenge for the defeat of 1946 with a points victory over Kurt Pettersén.

In 1950, Nasuh was part of a Turkish wrestling team that wrestled against the Federal Republic of Germany in Istanbul and won 8-0 over the Germans, who were allowed back on the international wrestling mat for the first time after a long absence and were overmatched. Nasuh Akar celebrated a shoulder victory over Manfred Spatz from Feudenheim. Finally, in 1951 Nasuh also won the world championship in Helsinki in the bantamweight. Three victories were enough for him to do so.

After the 1951 World Championships, differences arose in Turkey between some wrestlers from the national team and the Turkish wrestling federation over allegedly false expense claims. In addition to Ali Yücel and Nurettin Zafer, Nasuh Akar was also affected. The Turkish wrestling federation declared these athletes to be professionals without further ado, which meant that they could not participate in the 1952 Olympic Games.

In 1952, he retired from active wrestling and served then as trainer. Nasuh Akar was the first athlete to win a gold medal for Turkey in his weight class in freestyle wrestling. After his wrestling career, he worked as a coach and coached the Turkish National Team.

He died on 18 May 1984. After his death, a neighborhood in Çankaya district of Ankara and a training facility in Eskişehir were named after him. His wife Ayşe Akar survived him. A training sports hall in Eskişehir, opened in 1994, is named after Nasuh Akar.

== Achievements ==
- 1946 European Championships in Stockholm, Sweden - silver (Bantamweight)
- 1948 Olympics in London, England - gold (Bantamweight)
- 1949 European Championships in Istanbul, Turkey - gold (Bantamweight)
- 1951 World Championships in Helsinki, Finland - gold (Bantamweight)
