= Celal Atik =

Turkish wrestler and coach (1920–1979)

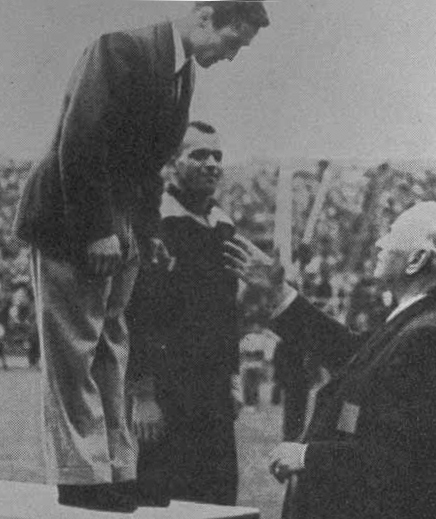
- Atik (left) at the 1948 Olympics

Personal information
- Born: 1920 Boğazlıyan, Yozgat, Ottoman Empire
- Died: 27 April 1979 (aged 58–59) Ankara, Turkey

Sport
- Sport: Wrestling
- Events: Freestyle; Greco-Roman
Medal record
Men's freestyle wrestling
Representing Turkey
Olympic Games
Gold medal – first place	1948 London	Lightweight
World Championships
Gold medal – first place	1951 Helsinki	Welterweight
European Championships
Gold medal – first place	1946 Stockholm	Lightweight
Gold medal – first place	1949 Istanbul	Welterweight
Greco-Roman wrestling
World Championships
Silver medal – second place	1950 Stockholm	Welterweight
European Championships
Bronze medal – third place	1947 Prague	Lightweight
Balkan Championships
Silver medal – second place	1940 Istanbul	Welterweight

Celal Atik (1920 – 27 April 1979) was a Turkish wrestler and coach. He competed both in Greco-Roman and freestyle wrestling, but had his best achievements in the freestyle, winning gold medals at the 1948 Olympics, 1951 World and 1946 and 1949 European championships.

== Biography ==
Atik was born in the village of Gürdan in the Boğazlıyan district of Yozgat Province, Turkey. He changed his family name from "Doğan" to "Atik" (literally, "Slippy") after a proposal by Mustafa Kemal Atatürk, the founder of the Turkish Republic, who noticed his speed at the 1938 national championships.

After retiring from competition, from 1955 to 1979 he coached the national wrestling team and prepared multiple international competitors. Appointed the head trainer by the International Wrestling Federation (FILA) in Switzerland, he gave lessons on wrestling techniques to sportspeople from all around the world.

He is recognized as one of Turkey's best wrestlers, with exceptional technique as well as the most aesthetic physique. In addition to his other honors, he was awarded with the Légion d'honneur of France.

Atik died at a hospital in Ankara, on 27 April 1979. Two sports halls—one in İzmir with a capacity of 1,200 people and another one in his hometown Yozgat—are named after him.

== Coaching achievements ==
- 1960 Summer Olympics in Rome, Italy – champion team
- 1964 Summer Olympics in Tokyo, Japan – 2 gold, 5 silver and 1 bronze
- 1968 Summer Olympics in Mexico City, Mexico – 2 gold
- 1955–1971 at all World Championships – various medals
