= Petru Marta =

Soviet wrestler (1952–2023)

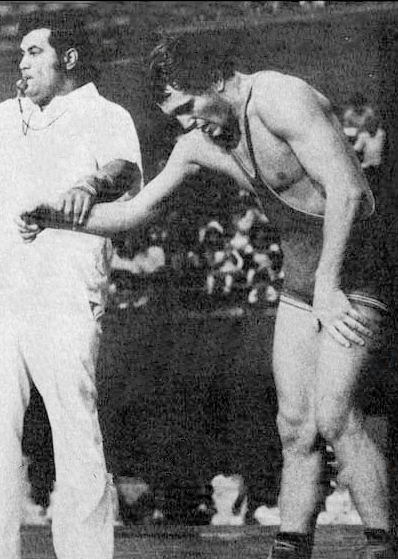
- Marta at the 1978 World Championships

Personal information
- Born: 21 September 1952 Fălești District, Moldavian SSR, USSR
- Died: 21 July 2023 (aged 70)

Sport
- Sport: Freestyle wrestling
Medal record
Representing Soviet Union
World Championships
Bronze medal – third place	1978 Mexico City	-74 kg
European Championships
Gold medal – first place	1977 Bursa	-74 kg
Gold medal – first place	1978 Sofia	-74 kg

Petru Marta (21 September 1952 – 21 July 2023) was a Moldovan and Soviet freestyle wrestler. He was a European champion in 1977 and 1978 and placed third at the 1978 World Championships.

Marta died from a stroke on 21 July 2023, at the age of 70.
