= Shamil Gitinov =

Armenian freestyle wrestler

Personal information
- Born: 4 July 1979 (age 47) Makhachkala, Dagestan
- Height: 1.84 m (6 ft 1/2 in)
- Weight: 95 kg (209 lb)

Sport
- Sport: Wrestling
- Event: Freestyle
- Club: CSKA Moscow
- Coached by: Idris Gitinov, Anatoli Margiev
Medal record
Men's freestyle wrestling
Representing Armenia
European Championships
| Silver medal – second place | 2006 Moscow | 96 kg |
| Bronze medal – third place | 2007 Sofia | 96 kg |

Shamil Gitinov (born 4 July 1979) is a retired Armenian Freestyle wrestler of Avar descent. He won a silver medal in 2006 and a bronze medal in 2007 at the European Wrestling Championships.
