= 1949 European Wrestling Championships =

- Host city: Istanbul, Turkey
- Dates: 3–5 June
- Stadium: Istanbul Lütfi Kırdar International Convention and Exhibition Center

Champions
- Freestyle: Turkey

The 1949 European Wrestling Championships was held from 3 to 5 June 1949 in Istanbul, Turkey. In the championship where only men's freestyle competitions were held, Turkey ranked first in the team rankings. Individually, Turkey ranked first with 6 gold medals and one silver and bronze medal each, followed by Sweden with two gold and bronze medals each and 3 silver medals, and Iran with 4 silver and 1 bronze medal.

== Medal table ==
* Host nation (Turkey)

Rank	Nation	Gold	Silver	Bronze	Total
1	Turkey*	6	1	1	8
2	Sweden	2	3	2	7
3	Iran	0	4	1	5
4	Egypt	0	0	2	2
5	Finland	0	0	1	1
5	Italy	0	0	1	1
Totals (6 entries)		8	8	8	24

== Medal summary ==
=== Men's freestyle ===
Event	Gold	Silver	Bronze
Flyweight; 52 kg	Ali Yücel; Turkey	Mansour Raeisi; Iran	Bengt Johansson; Sweden
Bantamweight; 57 kg	Nasuh Akar; Turkey	Kurt Pettersen; Sweden	Seyid Hafiz Shehata; Egypt
Featherweight; 62 kg	Olle Anderberg; Sweden	Hassan Saadian; Iran	Nurettin Zafer; Turkey
Lightweight; 67 kg	Servet Meriç; Turkey	Abdollah Mojtabavi; Iran	Paavo Pihlajamäki; Finland
Welterweight; 73 kg	Celal Atik; Turkey	Ali Ghaffari; Iran	Per Berlin; Sweden
Middleweight; 79 kg	Yaşar Doğu; Turkey	Axel Grönberg; Sweden	Muhammed Musa; Egypt
Light heavyweight 87 kg	Adil Candemir; Turkey	Viking Palm; Sweden	Nasser Javid; Iran
Heavyweight +87 kg	Bertil Antonsson; Sweden	Muharrem Candaş; Turkey	Natale Vecchi; Italy
