= 1946 European Wrestling Championships =

1946 European Championships
- Host city: Sweden, Stockholm
- Dates: 20–22 October 1946

Champions
- Freestyle: Turkey

The 1946 European Wrestling Championships were held in 20–22 October 1946 Stockholm, Sweden. The competitions were held only in freestyle wrestling.

== Medal table ==
* Host nation (Sweden)

Rank	Nation	Gold	Silver	Bronze	Total
1	Turkey	3	2	2	7
2	Sweden*	2	3	2	7
3	Finland	2	0	2	4
4	Hungary	1	1	0	2
5	Switzerland	0	2	1	3
6	France	0	0	1	1
Totals (6 entries)		8	8	8	24

== Medal summary ==
=== Men's freestyle ===
Event	Gold	Silver	Bronze
Flyweight; 52 kg	Lennart Viitala; Finland	Malte Håkansson; Sweden	Georges Labadie; France
Bantamweight; 57 kg	Lajos Bencze; Hungary	Nasuh Akar; Turkey	Erkki Johansson; Sweden
Featherweight; 62 kg	Gazanfer Bilge; Turkey	Olle Anderberg; Sweden	Paavo Hietala; Finland
Lightweight; 67 kg	Celal Atik; Turkey	Gösta Frändfors; Sweden	Lauri Kangas; Finland
Welterweight; 73 kg	Yaşar Doğu; Turkey	Kálmán Sóvari; Hungary	Karl Schaad; Switzerland
Middleweight; 79 kg	Eino Virtanen; Finland	Mahmut Çeterez; Turkey	Axel Grönberg; Sweden
Light heavyweight 87 kg	Bengt Fahlkvist; Sweden	Fritz Stöckli; Switzerland	Muharrem Candaş; Turkey
Heavyweight +87 kg	Bertil Antonsson; Sweden	Willy Lardon; Switzerland	Mehmet Çoban; Turkey
