= Jürgen Möbius =

German wrestler

Jürgen Möbius (born 6 December 1943 in Löderburg) is a German former wrestler who competed in the 1972 Summer Olympics and in the 1976 Summer Olympics.
