= Bayu Baev =

Bulgarian freestyle wrestler

Personal information
- Native name: Баю Йорданов Баев
- Born: 5 January 1941 (age 85) Malomir, Yambol, Bulgaria
- Height: 158 cm (5 ft 2 in)
- Weight: 51 kg (112 lb)

Sport
- Sport: Freestyle wrestling
Medal record
Representing Bulgaria
World Wrestling Championships
| Silver medal – second place | 1971 Sofia | -52 kg |
| Silver medal – second place | 1970 Edmonton | -52 kg |
| Silver medal – second place | 1965 Manchester | -52 kg |
European Wrestling Championships
| Silver medal – second place | 1972 Katowice | -52 kg |
| Gold medal – first place | 1970 Berlin | -52 kg |
| Gold medal – first place | 1969 Sofia | -52 kg |
| Gold medal – first place | 1968 Skopje | -52 kg |
| Silver medal – second place | 1967 Istanbul | -52 kg |

Bayu Yordanov Baev (Bulgarian: Баю Баев, born 5 January 1941) is a Bulgarian former freestyle wrestler who competed in the 1968 Summer Olympics and in the 1972 Summer Olympics.
