= Reşit Karabacak =

Turkish wrestler (1954–2020)

Reşit Karabacak (5 July 1954 – 19 November 2020) was a Turkish wrestler who competed in the 1984 Summer Olympics.

== Biography ==
Born in Erzurum, Turkey, he became European champion in 1983 in Budapest, beating Efraim Kamberov (Efraim Kamberoğlu), an ethnic Turk from Bulgaria.

Karabacak died from COVID-19 in Bursa on 19 November 2020, at the age of 66, during the COVID-19 pandemic in Turkey.
