= Gábor Tóth (wrestler) =

Hungarian wrestler

Personal information
- Nationality: Hungarian
- Born: 29 November 1964 (age 60); Budapest, Hungary

Sport
- Sport: Wrestling

Gábor Tóth (born 29 November 1964) is a Hungarian wrestler. He competed at the 1988 Summer Olympics and the 1992 Summer Olympics.
