= Reiner Heugabel =

German wrestler (born 1963)

Personal information
- Nationality: German
- Born: 5 February 1963 (age 62); Monheim am Rhein, West Germany

Sport
- Sport: Wrestling

Reiner Heugabel (born 5 February 1963) is a German wrestler. He competed at the 1984 Summer Olympics, the 1988 Summer Olympics and the 1992 Summer Olympics.
