= Algot Malmberg =

Swedish wrestler

Personal information
- Nationality: Swedish
- Born: 1 February 1903 Gothenburg, Sweden
- Died: 22 January 1971 (aged 67) Gothenburg, Sweden

Sport
- Sport: Wrestling

Algot Malmberg (1 February 1903 – 22 January 1971) was a Swedish wrestler. He competed in the men's freestyle lightweight at the 1928 Summer Olympics. He is the brother of Erik Malmberg.
