= Petre Coman =

Romanian wrestler

Petre Coman (8 June 1944 – May 2021) was a Romanian wrestler who competed in the 1968 Summer Olympics, in the 1972 Summer Olympics, and in the 1976 Summer Olympics. Petre Coman had the following finishes at major championships – 1975 World Championship: 62.0 kg. Freestyle (5th); 1968 European Championship: 63.0 kg. Freestyle (2nd); 1969 European Championship: 62.0 kg. Freestyle (2nd); 1976 European Championship: 62.0 kg. Freestyle (2nd); 1967 European Championship: 63.0 kg. Freestyle (3rd); 1970 European Championship: 62.0 kg. Freestyle (3rd); 1972 European Championship: 62.0 kg. Freestyle (3rd); 1975 European Championship: 62.0 kg. Freestyle (4th); 1966 European Championship: 63.0 kg. Freestyle (5th); 1970 European Championship: 62.0 kg. Greco-Roman (6th).
