= Johan Richthoff =

Swedish wrestler (1898–1983)

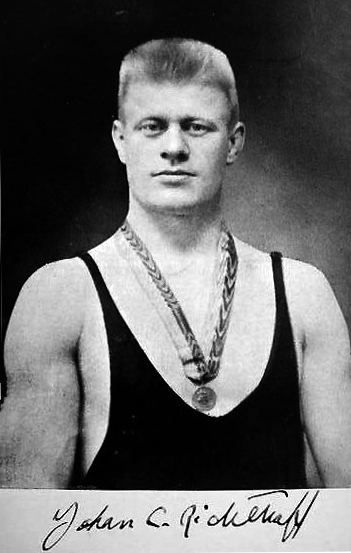
- Richthoff circa 1930

Personal information
- Full name: Johan Cornelius Richthoff
- Nickname: "Snövit"
- Born: 30 April 1898 Limhamn, Sweden
- Died: 1 October 1983 (aged 85) Limhamn, Sweden
- Height: 198 cm (6 ft 6 in)
- Weight: 115 kg (254 lb)

Sport
- Sport: Freestyle wrestling
- Club: BK Kärnan, Limhamn, Malmö
Medal record
Representing Sweden
Olympic Games
Gold medal – first place	1928 Amsterdam	Heavyweight
Gold medal – first place	1932 Los Angeles	Heavyweight

Johan Cornelius "Snövit" Richthoff (30 April 1898 – 1 October 1983) was a Swedish wrestler. He competed in the freestyle heavyweight division at the 1924, 1928 and 1932 Summer Olympics and won gold medals in 1928 and 1932; he shared fourth place in 1924.

Richthoff was born to a fisherman in a family of six, and trained in football and athletics before changing to wrestling. Besides his Olympic medals, he won the European titles in light-heavyweight freestyle in 1929 and 1930, and in Greco-Roman wrestling in 1930. Later that year he became the first wrestler to receive the Svenska Dagbladet Gold Medal. After the 1932 Olympics he wrestled professionally in the United States, and won 92 bouts out of 100, drawing 8 and losing none. In 1933 he returned to Sweden to prepare the national wrestling team to the 1936 Olympics, and continued to wrestle professionally until age 49. Richthoff was a Free Church preacher who campaigned against alcoholism. He was also active in music, literature and chess.

His occupation was that of cooper.
