= Hyacinthe Roosen =

Belgian wrestler

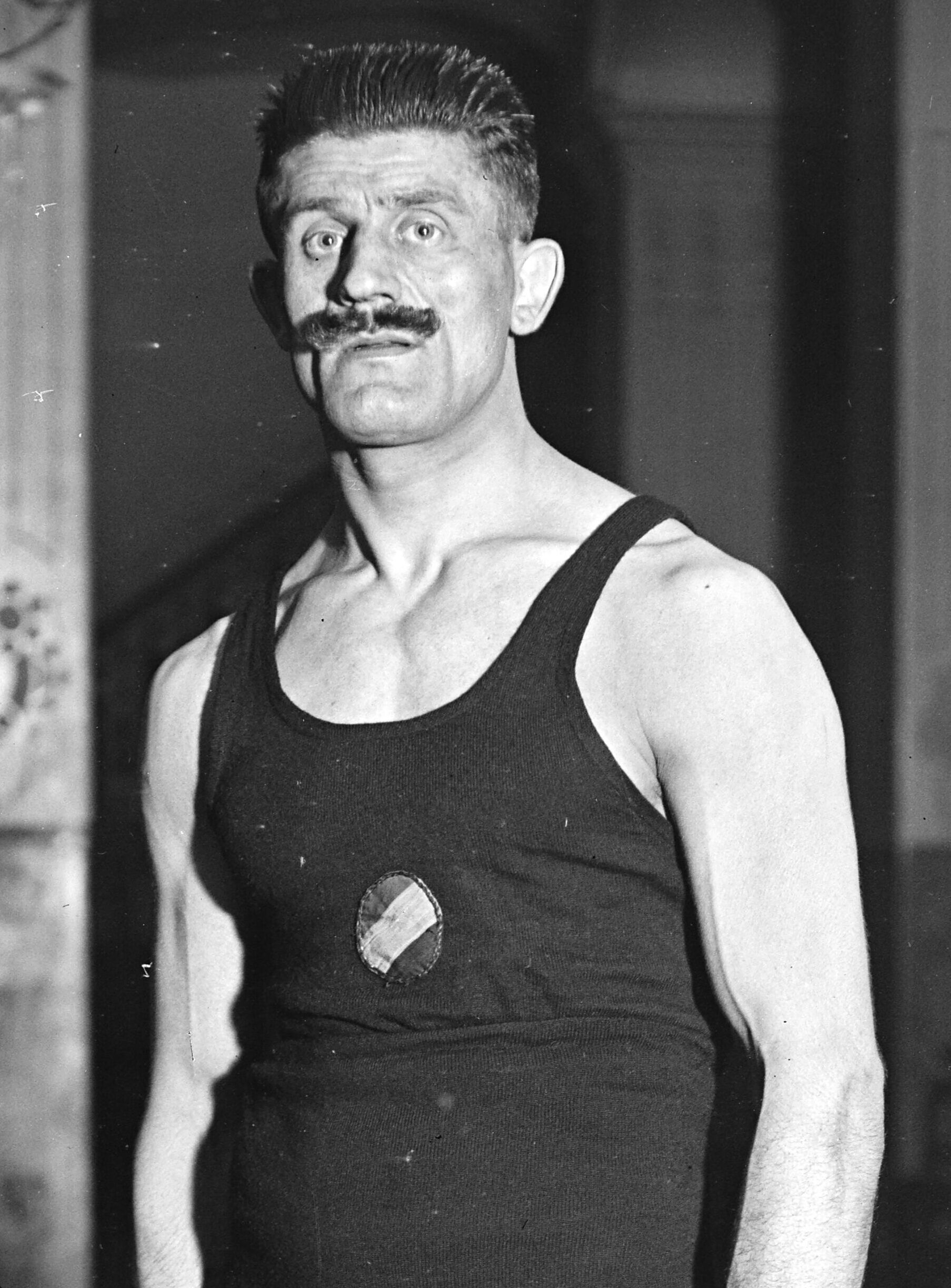
- Hyacinthe Roosen in 1928

Personal information
- Nationality: Belgian
- Born: 12 May 1897 Temse
- Died: 11 February 1967 (aged 69) Temse

Sport
- Sport: Wrestler

Hyacinthe Jan Roosen (12 May 1897 – 11 February 1967) was a Belgian wrestler. He competed at the 1920, 1924 and the 1928 Summer Olympics.
