= Fritz Käsermann =

Swiss wrestler

Personal information
- Nationality: Swiss

Sport
- Sport: Wrestling

Fritz Käsermann was a Swiss wrestler. He competed in the men's freestyle welterweight at the 1928 Summer Olympics.
