= Mehmet Esenceli =

Turkish wrestler

Personal information
- Nationality: Turkish
- Born: 1940 (age 85–86) Kahramanmaraş, Turkey

Sport
- Sport: Wrestling

Mehmet Esenceli (born 1940) is a Turkish wrestler. He competed in the men's freestyle 52 kg at the 1968 Summer Olympics.
