= Jan Szymański (wrestler) =

Polish wrestler

Jan Szymański (born 17 April 1960 in Sieradz, died there 12 August 2005) was a Polish wrestler who competed in the 1980 Summer Olympics.
