= Iran at the 1992 Summer Olympics =

- IOC code: IRI
- NOC: National Olympic Committee of the Islamic Republic of Iran

in Barcelona, Spain
- Competitors: 40 in 7 sports
- Flag bearer: Alireza Soleimani
- Medals Ranked 44th: Gold 0 Silver 1 Bronze 2 Total 3

Summer Olympics appearances (overview)
- 1900; 1904–1936; 1948; 1952; 1956; 1960; 1964; 1968; 1972; 1976; 1980–1984; 1988; 1992; 1996; 2000; 2004; 2008; 2012; 2016; 2020; 2024; 2028

Athletes from the Islamic Republic of Iran competed at the 1992 Summer Olympics in Barcelona, Spain.

== Competitors ==
Sport	Men	Women	Total
Athletics	2		2
Boxing	6		6
Cycling, Road	4		4
Cycling, Track	4		4
Table tennis	1		1
Taekwondo	3		3
Weightlifting	5		5
Wrestling	16		16
Total	40	0	40

== Medal summary ==
=== Medal table ===
Sport	Gold	Silver	Bronze	Total
Taekwondo		1	1	2
Wrestling		1	2	3
Total	0	1	2	3

Note: Demonstration sports indicated in italics.

=== Medalists ===
Medal	Name	Sport	Event
Silver	Askari Mohammadian	Wrestling	Men's freestyle 62 kg
Bronze	Amir Reza Khadem	Wrestling	Men's freestyle 74 kg
Bronze	Rasoul Khadem	Wrestling	Men's freestyle 82 kg

== Results by event ==
=== Athletics ===
Men

Athlete	Event	Round 1			Semifinal			Final		Rank
Athlete	Event	Heat	Time	Rank	Heat	Time	Rank	Time	Rank	Rank
Hamid Sajjadi	5000 m				2	14:04.54	8	Did not advance		38
Hamid Sajjadi	3000 m steeplechase	3	8:36.87	9	Did not advance					25

Athlete	Event	Qualifying		Final	
Athlete	Event	Result	Rank	Result	Rank
Hossein Shayan	High jump	2.10	33	Did not advance	

=== Boxing ===
Men

Athlete	Event	Round of 32	Round of 16	Quarterfinal	Semifinal	Final	Rank
Anoushiravan Nourian	63.5 kg	Piccirillo (ITA); L 5–23	Did not advance				17
Yousef Khateri	67 kg	Chenglai (THA); L 7–13	Did not advance				17
Siamak Varzideh	75 kg	Isangula (TAN); L RSC	Did not advance				17
Ali Asghar Kazemi	81 kg	Changezi (PAK); L Walkover	Did not advance				—
Morteza Shiri	91 kg	Bye	Izonritei (NGR); L RSC	Did not advance			9
Iraj Kiarostami	+91 kg	Nijman (NED); L 5–9	Did not advance				17

=== Cycling ===
==== Road ====
Men

Athlete	Event	Time	Rank
Hossein Eslami	Road race	Did not finish	
Khosro Ghamari	Road race	Did not finish	
Hossein Mahmoudi	Road race	Did not finish	
Nima Ebrahimnejad; Hossein Eslami; Khosro Ghamari; Hossein Mahmoudi	Team time trial	2:24:44	21

==== Track ====
Men

Athlete	Event	Eliminatory round		Quarterfinal	Semifinal	Final	Rank
Athlete	Event	Time	Rank	Quarterfinal	Semifinal	Final	Rank
Mohammad Reza Banna	1 km time trial					1:11.036	28
Mehrdad Afsharian	Individual pursuit	5:08.184	25	Did not advance			25
Nima Ebrahimnejad; Mehrdad Afsharian; Mohammad Reza Banna; Majid Nasseri	Team pursuit	4:45.745	19	Did not advance			19

Athlete	Event	Eliminatory round			Final		Rank
Athlete	Event	Heat	Score	Rank	Score	Rank	Rank
Majid Nasseri	Points race	2	Did not finish		Did not advance		—

=== Table tennis ===
Men

Athlete	Event	Group round		1/8 final	Quarterfinal	Semifinal	Final	Rank
Athlete	Event	Groups	Rank	1/8 final	Quarterfinal	Semifinal	Final	Rank
Ebrahim Alidokht	Singles	Saive (BEL); L 0–2; 19–21, 9–21	Group F 4	Did not advance				49
Ebrahim Alidokht	Singles	Hoyama (BRA); L 0–2; 15–21, 16–21	Group F 4	Did not advance				49
Ebrahim Alidokht	Singles	Mazunov (EUN); L 0–2; 12–21, 10–21	Group F 4	Did not advance				49

=== Weightlifting ===
Men

Athlete	Event	Snatch	Clean & Jerk	Total	Rank
Kazem Panjavi	67.5 kg	No mark	—	—	—
Abbas Talebi	75 kg	147.5	172.5	320.0	20
Alireza Azari	82.5 kg	140.0	175.0	315.0	23
Abdollah Fatemi	100 kg	150.0	190.0	340.0	17
Mozaffar Ajali	110 kg	155.0	190.0	345.0	19

=== Wrestling ===
Men's freestyle

Athlete	Event	Eliminatory						Final	Rank
Athlete	Event	Round 1	Round 2	Round 3	Round 4	Round 5	Round 6	Final	Rank
Nader Rahmati	48 kg	Chen (CHN); L 3–6	Pangelinan (GUM); W Fall	Vanni (USA); L 7–9	Did not advance				11
Majid Torkan	52 kg	Stannett (NZL); W Fall	Kumar (IND); W 16–1	Yordanov (BUL); L 2–3	Ri (PRK); L 0–4	Did not advance		7th place match Woodcroft (CAN); W 2–1	7
Oveis Mallah	57 kg	Garg (IND); W 6–2	Dawson (CAN); L 1–5	Cross (USA); L 3–5	Did not advance			9th place match Tsogtbayar (MGL); W Walkover	9
Askari Mohammadian	62 kg	Müller (SUI); W 5–1	Moustopoulos (GRE); W 4–0	Žukovs (LAT); W 11–0	Vasilev (BUL); W 4–2	Ilhan (AUS); W 6–0	Bye	Smith (USA); L 0–6	2nd place, silver medalist(s)
Ali Akbarnejad	68 kg	Getsov (BUL); L 2–3	Brown (AUS); W 4–0	Athanasiadis (GRE); W 5–1	Sartoro (FRA); W 3–0	Wilson (CAN); W 1–0		3rd place match Akaishi (JPN); L 0–4	4
Amir Reza Khadem	74 kg	Labuschagne (RSA); W 10–0	Bye	Vasiliadis (GRE); W 4–2	Holmes (CAN); W 3–0	Park (KOR); L 1–2		3rd place match Gadzhiev (EUN); W 1–0	3rd place, bronze medalist(s)
Rasoul Khadem	82 kg	Kostecki (POL); W 9–0	Hohl (CAN); W 5–2	Rauhala (FIN); W 8–0	Öztürk (TUR); W 3–0	Jackson (USA); L 1–3		3rd place match Gstöttner (GER); W 6–0	3rd place, bronze medalist(s)
Ayoub Baninosrat	90 kg	Sükhbat (MGL); L 0–1	Deskoulidis (GRE); W 4–0	Tóth (HUN); W 4–0	Şimşek (TUR); L 0–4	Did not advance		5th place match Limonta (CUB); W 3–1	5
Kazem Gholami	100 kg	Balz (GER); L 0–1	Carrow (CAN); W 2–0	Verma (IND); L 2–3	Play-off; Aavik (EST); W Walkover	Did not advance		9th place match Makaveev (BUL); W Fall	9
Alireza Soleimani	130 kg	Honda (JPN); W Fall	Park (KOR); W Fall	Figueroa (PUR); W Fall	Demir (TUR); L 1–2	Bye	Thue (CAN); L 0–0, DSQ2	5th place match Schröder (GER); L Walkover	6

Men's Greco-Roman

Athlete	Event	Eliminatory						Final	Rank
Athlete	Event	Round 1	Round 2	Round 3	Round 4	Round 5	Round 6	Final	Rank
Reza Simkhah	48 kg	Pelikyan (BUL); W 7–5	Faragó (HUN); W 12–1	Yadav (IND); W 11–1	Yıldız (GER); W 3–0	Failed to make weight		5th place match Dăscălescu (ROM); L Walkover	6
Majid Jahandideh	52 kg	Min (KOR); L DNF	Kamesaki (FIN); L 0–6	Did not advance				Did not advance	15
Ahad Pazaj	62 kg	Patil (IND); W 14–3	Withdrew	Did not advance				Did not advance	13
Abdollah Chamangoli	68 kg	Ben Djedaa (ALG); W 6–0	Nikitin (EST); W 7–5	Kim (KOR); L 1–5	Passarelli (GER); W 1–0	Dugushiev (EUN); L 0–8	Rodríguez (CUB); L 2–10	5th place match Yalouz (FRA); L Walkover	6
Ahad Javansalehi	74 kg	Zeman (TCH); L 0–4	Balcı (TUR); L 0–2	Did not advance					18
Hassan Babak	90 kg	Bye	Eom (KOR); W 2–0	Hussein (EGY); W 2–1	Peña (CUB); W 2–0	Bullmann (GER); L 1–3	Ljungberg (SWE); L 0–2	5th place match Foy (USA); W 17–1	5

== Demonstration sports ==
=== Taekwondo ===
Men

Athlete	Event	Quarterfinal	Semifinal	Final	Rank
Fariborz Askari	70 kg	Villasana (USA); W 3–3	Khali (FRA); W 3–2	Santolaria (ESP); L 1–4	2nd place, silver medalist(s)
Reza Mehmandoust	76 kg	Hasan (BRN); W	Lee (CAN); L	Did not advance	3rd place, bronze medalist(s)
Mansour Bagheri	83 kg	Sbeihi (JOR); L 2–3	Did not advance		5
