= Wrestling at the 1992 Summer Olympics – Men's freestyle 62 kg =

Men's freestyle 62 kg at the Games of the XXV Olympiad
- Venue: Institut Nacional d'Educació Física de Catalunya
- Dates: 5–7 August 1992
- Competitors: 21 from 21 nations

Medalists
1st place, gold medalist(s)		John Smith	United States
2nd place, silver medalist(s)		Askari Mohammadian	Iran
3rd place, bronze medalist(s)		Lázaro Reinoso	Cuba

The men's freestyle 62 kilograms at the 1992 Summer Olympics as part of the wrestling program were held at the Institut Nacional d'Educació Física de Catalunya from August 5 to August 7. The wrestlers are divided into 2 groups. The winner of each group decided by a double-elimination system.

== Results ==
Legend

- WO — Won by walkover

=== Elimination A ===
==== Round 1 ====
	Score		CP
Lázaro Reinoso (CUB)	6–11	Magomed Azizov (EUN)	1–3 PP
Giovanni Schillaci (ITA)	2–1	Takumi Adachi (JPN)	3–1 PP
Karsten Polky (GER)	5–3	Tjaart du Plessis (RSA)	3–1 PP
İsmail Faikoğlu (TUR)	2–3	John Smith (USA)	1–3 PP
Kim Gwang-chol (PRK)	6–2	Shin Sang-kyu (KOR)	3–1 PP
Marty Calder (CAN)		Bye	

==== Round 2 ====
	Score		CP
Marty Calder (CAN)	7–10	Lázaro Reinoso (CUB)	1–3 PP
Magomed Azizov (EUN)	3–1	Giovanni Schillaci (ITA)	3–1 PP
Takumi Adachi (JPN)	5–7	Karsten Polky (GER)	1–3 PP
Tjaart du Plessis (RSA)	0–9	İsmail Faikoğlu (TUR)	0–3 PO
John Smith (USA)	2–1	Kim Gwang-chol (PRK)	3–1 PP
Shin Sang-kyu (KOR)		Bye	

==== Round 3 ====
	Score		CP
Shin Sang-kyu (KOR)	5–2	Marty Calder (CAN)	3–1 PP
Lázaro Reinoso (CUB)	3–1	Giovanni Schillaci (ITA)	3–1 PP
Magomed Azizov (EUN)	2–1	İsmail Faikoğlu (TUR)	3–1 PP
Karsten Polky (GER)	0–8	John Smith (USA)	0–3 PO
Kim Gwang-chol (PRK)		Bye	

==== Round 4 ====
	Score		CP
Kim Gwang-chol (PRK)	4–6	Lázaro Reinoso (CUB)	1–3 PP
Shin Sang-kyu (KOR)	5–2	Karsten Polky (GER)	3–1 PP
Magomed Azizov (EUN)	1–17	John Smith (USA)	0–4 ST

==== Round 5 ====
	Score		CP
Shin Sang-kyu (KOR)	5–11	Magomed Azizov (EUN)	1–3 PP
Lázaro Reinoso (CUB)	3–1	John Smith (USA)	3–1 PP

==== Summary ====
Pos	Athlete	Pld	W	L	R	CP	TP
1	John Smith (USA)	5	4	1	X (Note: Classification points: USA 5, CUB 4, EUN 3)	14	31
2	Lázaro Reinoso (CUB)	5	4	1	X	13	28
3	Magomed Azizov (EUN)	5	4	1	X	12	28
4	Shin Sang-kyu (KOR)	4	2	2	5	8	17
5	Karsten Polky (GER)	4	2	2	4	7	14
—	Kim Gwang-chol (PRK)	3	1	2	4	5	11
—	İsmail Faikoğlu (TUR)	3	1	2	3	5	12
—	Giovanni Schillaci (ITA)	3	1	2	3	5	4
—	Marty Calder (CAN)	2	0	2	3	2	9
—	Takumi Adachi (JPN)	2	0	2	2	2	6
—	Tjaart du Plessis (RSA)	2	0	2	2	1	3

Source: Official Report

=== Elimination B ===
==== Round 1 ====
	Score		CP
Martin Müller (SUI)	1–5	Askari Mohammadian (IRI)	1–3 PP
Dharan Singh Dahiya (IND)	4–6	Georgios Moustopoulos (GRE)	1–3 PP
Eduards Žukovs (LAT)	2–5 Fall	Musa Ilhan (AUS)	4–0 TO
Dariusz Grzywiński (POL)	2–3 Fall	Anibál Nieves (PUR)	0–4 TO
Vicente Cáceres (ESP)	3–10	Rosen Vasilev (BUL)	1–3 PP

==== Round 2 ====
	Score		CP
Martin Müller (SUI)	8–2	Dharan Singh Dahiya (IND)	3–1 PP
Askari Mohammadian (IRI)	4–0	Georgios Moustopoulos (GRE)	3–0 PO
Eduards Žukovs (LAT)	2–4	Dariusz Grzywiński (POL)	1–3 PP
Musa Ilhan (AUS)	11–4	Vicente Cáceres (ESP)	3–1 PP
Anibál Nieves (PUR)	2–6	Rosen Vasilev (BUL)	1–3 PP

==== Round 3 ====
	Score		CP
Martin Müller (SUI)	5–0 Ret	Georgios Moustopoulos (GRE)	4–0 PA
Askari Mohammadian (IRI)	11–0	Eduards Žukovs (LAT)	3–0 PO
Musa Ilhan (AUS)	9–3 Fall	Anibál Nieves (PUR)	4–0 TO
Dariusz Grzywiński (POL)	4–5	Rosen Vasilev (BUL)	1–3 PP

==== Round 4 ====
	Score		CP
Martin Müller (SUI)	3–4	Musa Ilhan (AUS)	1–3 PP
Askari Mohammadian (IRI)	4–2	Rosen Vasilev (BUL)	3–1 PP
Eduards Žukovs (LAT)	1–6	Anibál Nieves (PUR)	1–3 PP

- Eduards Žukovs (LAT) and Anibál Nieves (PUR) were tied on classification points for fifth.

==== Round 5 ====
	Score		CP
Askari Mohammadian (IRI)	6–0	Musa Ilhan (AUS)	3–0 PO
Rosen Vasilev (BUL)		Bye	

==== Round 6 ====
	Score		CP
Rosen Vasilev (BUL)	8–3	Musa Ilhan (AUS)	3–1 PP
Askari Mohammadian (IRI)		Bye	

==== Summary ====
Pos	Athlete	Pld	W	L	R	CP	TP
1	Askari Mohammadian (IRI)	5	5	0	X (Note: Classification points: IRI 6, BUL 4, AUS 1)	15	30
2	Rosen Vasilev (BUL)	5	4	1	X	13	31
3	Musa Ilhan (AUS)	6	3	3	X	11	32
4	Martin Müller (SUI)	4	2	2	4	9	17
5	Anibál Nieves (PUR)	4	2	2	3	8	14
—	Eduards Žukovs (LAT)	4	1	3	3	6	5
—	Dariusz Grzywiński (POL)	3	1	2	3	4	10
—	Georgios Moustopoulos (GRE)	3	1	2	3	3	6
—	Vicente Cáceres (ESP)	2	0	2	2	2	7
—	Dharan Singh Dahiya (IND)	2	0	2	2	2	6

Source: Official Report

=== Finals ===
	Score		CP
9th place match
Karsten Polky (GER)	WO	Anibál Nieves (PUR)	4–0 PA
7th place match
Shin Sang-kyu (KOR)	2–9 Fall	Martin Müller (SUI)	0–4 TO
5th place match
Magomed Azizov (EUN)	11–5	Musa Ilhan (AUS)	3–1 PP
Bronze medal match
Lázaro Reinoso (CUB)	4–0	Rosen Vasilev (BUL)	3–0 PO
Gold medal match
John Smith (USA)	6–0	Askari Mohammadian (IRI)	3–0 PO

== Final standing ==
Rank	Athlete
1st place, gold medalist(s)	John Smith (USA)
2nd place, silver medalist(s)	Askari Mohammadian (IRI)
3rd place, bronze medalist(s)	Lázaro Reinoso (CUB)
4	Rosen Vasilev (BUL)
5	Magomed Azizov (EUN)
6	Musa Ilhan (AUS)
7	Martin Müller (SUI)
8	Shin Sang-kyu (KOR)
9	Karsten Polky (GER)
10	Anibál Nieves (PUR)
