= Wrestling at the 1988 Summer Olympics – Men's freestyle 62 kg =

Men's freestyle 62 kg at the Games of the XXIV Olympiad
- Venue: Sangmu Gymnasium
- Dates: 27–29 September 1988
- Competitors: 28 from 28 nations

Medalists
1st place, gold medalist(s)		John Smith	United States
2nd place, silver medalist(s)		Stepan Sarkisyan	Soviet Union
3rd place, bronze medalist(s)		Simeon Shterev	Bulgaria

The Men's Freestyle 62 kg at the 1988 Summer Olympics as part of the wrestling program were held at the Sangmu Gymnasium, Seongnam.

== Medalists ==
Gold	John Smith; United States
Silver	Stepan Sarkisyan; Soviet Union
Bronze	Simeon Shterev; Bulgaria

== Tournament results ==
The wrestlers are divided into 2 groups. The winner of each group decided by a double-elimination system.

Legend

- TF — Won by Fall
- SP — Won by Superiority, 12-14 points difference, the loser with points
- SO — Won by Superiority, 12-14 points difference, the loser without points
- ST — Won by Technical Superiority, 15 points difference
- PP — Won by Points, the loser with technical points
- PO — Won by Points, the loser without technical points
- P0 — Won by Passivity, scoring zero points
- P1 — Won by Passivity, while leading by 1-11 points
- PS — Won by Passivity, while leading by 12-14 points
- PA — Won by Opponent Injury
- DQ — Won by Forfeit
- DNA — Did not appear
- L — Losses
- ER — Round of Elimination
- CP — Classification Points
- TP — Technical Points

=== Eliminatory round ===
==== Group A ====
L		CP	TP		L
Round 1
0	Mika Lehto (FIN)	3-1 PP	10-2	Arturo Oporta (PAN)	1
0	Marian Skubacz (POL)	3-1 PP	8-4	Ali Dad (AFG)	1
0	John Smith (USA)	3-1 PP	11-4	József Orbán (HUN)	1
0	Simeon Shterev (BUL)	3-1 PP	2-1	Kazuhito Sakae (JPN)	1
1	Daniel Cumming (AUS)	0-4 ST	0-16	Avirmediin Enkhee (MGL)	0
1	Vicente Cáceres (ESP)	1-3 PP	4-6	Theodore Dikanda (SWE)	0
1	Huang Chien-lun (TPE)	0-4 ST	2-18	Giovanni Schillaci (ITA)	0
Round 2
1	Mika Lehto (FIN)	1-3 PP	1-4	Marian Skubacz (POL)	0
2	Arturo Oporta (PAN)	0-3 PO	0-7	Ali Dad (AFG)	1
0	John Smith (USA)	3-1 PP	6-3	Simeon Shterev (BUL)	1
2	József Orbán (HUN)	1-3 PP	4-5	Kazuhito Sakae (JPN)	1
1	Daniel Cumming (AUS)	3-1 PP	11-5	Vicente Cáceres (ESP)	2
0	Avirmediin Enkhee (MGL)	4-0 ST	15-0	Huang Chien-lun (TPE)	2
1	Theodore Dikanda (SWE)	1-3 PP	1-7	Giovanni Schillaci (ITA)	0
Round 3
1	Mika Lehto (FIN)	3-0 PO	7-0	Ali Dad (AFG)	2
1	Marian Skubacz (POL)	1-3 PP	2-4	John Smith (USA)	0
1	Simeon Shterev (BUL)	4-0 TF	2:45	Daniel Cumming (AUS)	2
1	Kazuhito Sakae (JPN)	4-0 TF	5:32	Theodore Dikanda (SWE)	2
0	Avirmediin Enkhee (MGL)	3-1 PP	6-2	Giovanni Schillaci (ITA)	1
Round 4
2	Mika Lehto (FIN)	1-3 PP	6-16	John Smith (USA)	0
2	Marian Skubacz (POL)	0-3 PO	0-2	Simeon Shterev (BUL)	1
2	Kazuhito Sakae (JPN)	1-3 PP	1-7	Avirmediin Enkhee (MGL)	0
1	Giovanni Schillaci (ITA)			Bye	
Round 5
2	Giovanni Schillaci (ITA)	0-4 TF	5:54	John Smith (USA)	0
1	Simeon Shterev (BUL)	3-0 P1	5:25	Avirmediin Enkhee (MGL)	1
Round 6
0	John Smith (USA)	3-1 PP	12-7	Avirmediin Enkhee (MGL)	2
1	Simeon Shterev (BUL)			Bye	

Wrestler	L	ER	CP
John Smith (USA)	0	-	19
Simeon Shterev (BUL)	1	-	14
Avirmediin Enkhee (MGL)	2	6	15
Giovanni Schillaci (ITA)	2	5	8
Kazuhito Sakae (JPN)	2	4	9
Mika Lehto (FIN)	2	4	8
Marian Skubacz (POL)	2	4	7
Theodore Dikanda (SWE)	2	3	4
Ali Dad (AFG)*	2	3	4
Daniel Cumming (AUS)	2	3	3
Vicente Cáceres (ESP)	2	2	2
József Orbán (HUN)	2	2	2
Arturo Oporta (PAN)	2	2	1
Huang Chien-lun (TPE)	2	2	0

* was disqualified after he tested positive for Furosemide

==== Group B ====
L		CP	TP		L
Round 1
0	Selman Kaygusuz (TUR)	4-0 TF	1:20	François Yinga (CMR)	1
1	Li Xianji (CHN)	1-3 PP	10-15	Gary Bohay (CAN)	0
1	Steve Reinsfield (NZL)	0-3 P1	5:33	Karsten Polky (GDR)	0
0	Stepan Sarkisyan (URS)	4-0 ST	16-0	Ravinder Singh Tut (GBR)	1
1	Javier Rincon (COL)	0-4 TF	3:30	Ludwig Küng (SUI)	0
0	Jörg Helmdach (FRG)	3-1 PP	8-4	Kim Yeon-man (KOR)	1
1	Paul Farrugia (MLT)	0-4 ST	0-15	Akbar Fallah (IRI)	0
Round 2
0	Selman Kaygusuz (TUR)	3-1 PP	13-5	Li Xianji (CHN)	2
2	François Yinga (CMR)	0-4 TF	2:45	Gary Bohay (CAN)	0
2	Steve Reinsfield (NZL)	0-3.5 SO	0-13	Stepan Sarkisyan (URS)	0
0	Karsten Polky (GDR)	4-0 TF	1:20	Ravinder Singh Tutt (GBR)	2
2	Javier Rincon (COL)	0-3 PO	0-4	Jörg Helmdach (FRG)	0
0	Ludwig Küng (SUI)	4-0 TF	0:33	Paul Farrugia (MLT)	2
2	Kim Yeon-Man (KOR)	1-3 PP	3-4	Akbar Fallah (IRI)	0
Round 3
1	Selman Kaygusuz (TUR)	1-3 PP	5-6	Gary Bohay (CAN)	0
1	Karsten Polky (GDR)	.5-3.5 SP	1-13	Stepan Sarkisyan (URS)	0
1	Ludwig Küng (SUI)	0-3 PO	0-6	Jörg Helmdach (FRG)	0
0	Akbar Fallah (IRI)			Bye	
Round 4
0	Akbar Fallah (IRI)	3-1 PP	6-1	Gary Bohay (CAN)	1
1	Karsten Polky (GDR)	3-1 PP	7-3	Ludwig Küng (SUI)	2
0	Stepan Sarkisyan (URS)	3-1 PP	7-2	Jörg Helmdach (FRG)	1
1	Selman Kaygusuz (TUR)			DNA	
Round 5
0	Akbar Fallah (IRI)	3-1 PP	10-3	Karsten Polky (GDR)	2
2	Gary Bohay (CAN)	1-3 PP	1-8	Stepan Sarkisyan (URS)	0
1	Jörg Helmdach (FRG)			Bye	
Round 6
2	Jörg Helmdach (FRG)	0-3 PO	0-5	Akbar Fallah (IRI)	0
0	Stepan Sarkisyan (URS)			Bye	
Round 7
0	Stepan Sarkisyan (URS)	3-1 PP	12-1	Akbar Fallah (IRI)	1

Wrestler	L	ER	CP
Stepan Sarkisyan (URS)	0	-	20
Akbar Fallah (IRI)	1	-	17
Jörg Helmdach (FRG)	2	6	10
Gary Bohay (CAN)	2	5	12
Karsten Polky (GDR)	2	5	11.5
Ludwig Küng (SUI)	2	4	9
Selman Kaygusuz (TUR)	1	3	8
Li Xianji (CHN)	2	2	2
Kim Yeon-Man (KOR)	2	2	2
François Yinga (CMR)	2	2	0
Javier Rincon (COL)	2	2	0
Ravinder Singh Tutt (GBR)	2	2	0
Paul Farrugia (MLT)	2	2	0
Steve Reinsfield (NZL)	2	2	0

=== Final round ===
	CP	TP	
7th place match
Giovanni Schillaci (ITA)	3-0 PO	5-0	Gary Bohay (CAN)
5th place match
Avirmediin Enkhee (MGL)	1-3 PP	4-5	Jörg Helmdach (FRG)
Bronze medal match
Simeon Shterev (BUL)	3-1 PP	5-2	Akbar Fallah (IRI)
Gold medal match
John Smith (USA)	3-0 PO	4-0	Stepan Sarkisyan (URS)

== Final standings ==
1. John Smith (USA)
2. Stepan Sarkisyan (URS)
3. Simeon Shterev (BUL)
4. Akbar Fallah (IRI)
5. Jörg Helmdach (FRG)
6. Avirmediin Enkhee (MGL)
7. Giovanni Schillaci (ITA)
8. Gary Bohay (CAN)
