= Wrestling at the 1992 Summer Olympics – Men's freestyle 68 kg =

Men's freestyle 68 kg at the Games of the XXV Olympiad
- Venue: Institut Nacional d'Educació Física de Catalunya
- Dates: 3–5 August 1992
- Competitors: 21 from 21 nations

Medalists
| 1st place, gold medalist(s) | | Arsen Fadzaev | Unified Team |
| 2nd place, silver medalist(s) | | Valentin Getsov | Bulgaria |
| 3rd place, bronze medalist(s) | | Kosei Akaishi | Japan |

The men's freestyle 68 kilograms at the 1992 Summer Olympics as part of the wrestling program were held at the Institut Nacional d'Educació Física de Catalunya from August 3 to August 5. The wrestlers are divided into 2 groups. The winner of each group decided by a double-elimination system.

== Results ==
Legend

- WO — Won by walkover

=== Elimination A ===
==== Round 1 ====
| | Score | | CP |
|---|---|---|---|
| Endre Elekes (HUN) | 0–8 Fall | Kosei Akaishi (JPN) | 0–4 TO |
| Jesús Rodríguez (CUB) | 1–2 | Max Geller (ISR) | 1–3 PP |
| Fatih Özbaş (TUR) | 4–2 | Ibo Oziti (NGR) | 3–1 PP |
| Ludwig Küng (SUI) | 0–14 Ret | Arsen Fadzaev (EUN) | 0–4 PA |
| Calum McNeil (GBR) | 0–5 | Townsend Saunders (USA) | 0–3 PO |
| Francisco Barcia (ESP) | | Bye | |

==== Round 2 ====
| | Score | | CP |
|---|---|---|---|
| Francisco Barcia (ESP) | 1–7 | Endre Elekes (HUN) | 1–3 PP |
| Kosei Akaishi (JPN) | 1–0 | Jesús Rodríguez (CUB) | 3–0 PO |
| Max Geller (ISR) | 0–2 | Fatih Özbaş (TUR) | 0–3 PO |
| Ibo Oziti (NGR) | 4–0 | Calum McNeil (GBR) | 3–0 PO |
| Arsen Fadzaev (EUN) | 4–1 | Townsend Saunders (USA) | 3–1 PP |

- Ludwig Küng (SUI) withdrew due to injury.

==== Round 3 ====
| | Score | | CP |
|---|---|---|---|
| Francisco Barcia (ESP) | 0–9 | Kosei Akaishi (JPN) | 0–3 PO |
| Endre Elekes (HUN) | 0–0 | Max Geller (ISR) | 0–0 D2 |
| Fatih Özbaş (TUR) | 0–2 | Arsen Fadzaev (EUN) | 0–3 PO |
| Ibo Oziti (NGR) | 0–4 Fall | Townsend Saunders (USA) | 0–4 TO |

==== Round 4 ====
| | Score | | CP |
|---|---|---|---|
| Kosei Akaishi (JPN) | 1–3 | Arsen Fadzaev (EUN) | 1–3 PP |
| Fatih Özbaş (TUR) | 5–2 | Townsend Saunders (USA) | 3–1 PP |

==== Round 5 ====
| | Score | | CP |
|---|---|---|---|
| Kosei Akaishi (JPN) | 3–0 | Fatih Özbaş (TUR) | 3–0 PO |
| Arsen Fadzaev (EUN) | | Bye | |

==== Summary ====
| Pos | Athlete | Pld | W | L | R | CP | TP |
|---|---|---|---|---|---|---|---|
| 1 | Arsen Fadzaev (EUN) | 4 | 4 | 0 | X (Note: Classification points: EUN 6, JPN 4, TUR 0) | 13 | 23 |
| 2 | Kosei Akaishi (JPN) | 5 | 4 | 1 | X | 14 | 22 |
| 3 | Fatih Özbaş (TUR) | 5 | 3 | 2 | X | 9 | 11 |
| 4 | Townsend Saunders (USA) | 4 | 2 | 2 | 4 | 9 | 12 |
| — | Ibo Oziti (NGR) | 3 | 1 | 2 | 3 | 4 | 6 |
| 5 | Endre Elekes (HUN) | 3 | 1 | 2 | 3 | 3 | 7 |
| — | Max Geller (ISR) | 3 | 1 | 2 | 3 | 3 | 2 |
| — | Francisco Barcia (ESP) | 2 | 0 | 2 | 3 | 1 | 1 |
| — | Jesús Rodríguez (CUB) | 2 | 0 | 2 | 2 | 1 | 1 |
| — | Calum McNeil (GBR) | 2 | 0 | 2 | 2 | 0 | 0 |
| — | Ludwig Küng (SUI) | 1 | 0 | 1 | 1 | 0 | 0 |

Source: Official Report

=== Elimination B ===
==== Round 1 ====
| | Score | | CP |
|---|---|---|---|
| Ko Young-ho (KOR) | 2–4 | Georgios Athanasiadis (GRE) | 1–3 PP |
| Küllo Kõiv (EST) | 2–4 | Georg Schwabenland (GER) | 1–3 PP |
| Cris Brown (AUS) | 3–4 | Gérard Sartoro (FRA) | 1–3 PP |
| Ali Akbarnejad (IRI) | 2–3 | Valentin Getsov (BUL) | 1–3 PP |
| Ahmad Al-Osta (SYR) | 2–3 | Chris Wilson (CAN) | 1–3 PP |

==== Round 2 ====
| | Score | | CP |
|---|---|---|---|
| Ko Young-ho (KOR) | 3–1 | Küllo Kõiv (EST) | 3–1 PP |
| Georgios Athanasiadis (GRE) | 0–0 | Georg Schwabenland (GER) | 0–0 D2 |
| Cris Brown (AUS) | 0–4 | Ali Akbarnejad (IRI) | 0–3 PO |
| Gérard Sartoro (FRA) | 1–0 | Ahmad Al-Osta (SYR) | 3–0 PO |
| Valentin Getsov (BUL) | 1–3 | Chris Wilson (CAN) | 1–3 PP |

==== Round 3 ====
| | Score | | CP |
|---|---|---|---|
| Ko Young-ho (KOR) | 3–0 | Georg Schwabenland (GER) | 3–0 PO |
| Georgios Athanasiadis (GRE) | 1–5 | Ali Akbarnejad (IRI) | 1–3 PP |
| Gérard Sartoro (FRA) | 2–9 | Valentin Getsov (BUL) | 1–3 PP |
| Chris Wilson (CAN) | | Bye | |

==== Round 4 ====
| | Score | | CP |
|---|---|---|---|
| Chris Wilson (CAN) | 1–2 | Ko Young-ho (KOR) | 1–3 PP |
| Gérard Sartoro (FRA) | 0–3 | Ali Akbarnejad (IRI) | 0–3 PO |
| Valentin Getsov (BUL) | | Bye | |

==== Round 5 ====
| | Score | | CP |
|---|---|---|---|
| Valentin Getsov (BUL) | 7–5 | Ko Young-ho (KOR) | 3–1 PP |
| Chris Wilson (CAN) | 0–1 | Ali Akbarnejad (IRI) | 0–3 PO |

==== Summary ====
| Pos | Athlete | Pld | W | L | R | CP | TP |
|---|---|---|---|---|---|---|---|
| 1 | Valentin Getsov (BUL) | 4 | 3 | 1 | X (Note: BUL 3–1 IRI) | 10 | 20 |
| 2 | Ali Akbarnejad (IRI) | 5 | 4 | 1 | X | 13 | 15 |
| 3 | Ko Young-ho (KOR) | 5 | 3 | 2 | 5 | 11 | 15 |
| 4 | Chris Wilson (CAN) | 4 | 2 | 2 | 5 | 7 | 7 |
| 5 | Gérard Sartoro (FRA) | 4 | 2 | 2 | 4 | 7 | 7 |
| — | Georgios Athanasiadis (GRE) | 3 | 1 | 2 | 3 | 4 | 5 |
| — | Georg Schwabenland (GER) | 3 | 1 | 2 | 3 | 3 | 4 |
| — | Küllo Kõiv (EST) | 2 | 0 | 2 | 2 | 2 | 3 |
| — | Cris Brown (AUS) | 2 | 0 | 2 | 2 | 1 | 3 |
| — | Ahmad Al-Osta (SYR) | 2 | 0 | 2 | 2 | 1 | 2 |

Source: Official Report

=== Finals ===
| | Score | | CP |
9th place match
| Endre Elekes (HUN) | WO | Gérard Sartoro (FRA) | |
7th place match
| Townsend Saunders (USA) | 6–3 | Chris Wilson (CAN) | 3–1 PP |
5th place match
| Fatih Özbaş (TUR) | 3–1 | Ko Young-ho (KOR) | 3–1 PP |
Bronze medal match
| Kosei Akaishi (JPN) | 4–0 | Ali Akbarnejad (IRI) | 3–0 PO |
Gold medal match
| Arsen Fadzaev (EUN) | 13–1 | Valentin Getsov (BUL) | 3.5–0.5 SP |

== Final standing ==
| Rank | Athlete |
|---|---|
| 1st place, gold medalist(s) | Arsen Fadzaev (EUN) |
| 2nd place, silver medalist(s) | Valentin Getsov (BUL) |
| 3rd place, bronze medalist(s) | Kosei Akaishi (JPN) |
| 4 | Ali Akbarnejad (IRI) |
| 5 | Fatih Özbaş (TUR) |
| 6 | Ko Young-ho (KOR) |
| 7 | Townsend Saunders (USA) |
| 8 | Chris Wilson (CAN) |
| 9 | Gérard Sartoro (FRA) |
| 10 | Endre Elekes (HUN) |
