= Wrestling at the 1993 Mediterranean Games =

Wrestling competition

- Dates: June–July 1993

The wrestling tournament at the 1993 Mediterranean Games was held in Perpignan, France.

== Medals table ==
* Host nation (France)

Rank	Nation	Gold	Silver	Bronze	Total
1	Turkey	10	5	3	18
2	France	4	2	3	9
3	Greece	2	3	7	12
4	Syria	2	1	2	5
5	Egypt	1	4	2	7
6	Italy	0	3	1	4
7	Cyprus	0	1	0	1
8	Tunisia	0	0	1	1
Totals (8 entries)		19	19	19	57

== Medalists ==
=== Men's freestyle ===
Event	Gold	Silver	Bronze
48 kg	Fevzi Kaynak; Turkey	Filippo Fiumefreddo; Italy	Nidal Sik; Syria
52 kg	Mevlana Kulaç; Turkey	Michele Liuzzi; Italy	Ivan Tabounidis; Greece
57 kg	İsmail Zurnacı; Turkey	Georgios Petrov; Greece	Madżdi Mahmud Jusuf; Egypt
62 kg	İsmail Faikoğlu; Turkey	Aroutioun Barseguian; Cyprus	Jeorjos Mustopulos; Greece
68 kg	Jeorjos Atanasiadis; Greece	Ahmad Al-Aosta; Syria	Fatih Özbaş; Turkey
74 kg	Selahattin Yiğit; Turkey	Muhammad al-Chudari; Egypt	Ioannis Athanassiadis; Greece
82 kg	Sebahattin Öztürk; Turkey	Alcide Legrand; France	Mohamed Zayar; Syria
90 kg	William Rombouts; France	Hikmet Günaydın; Turkey	Dimitrios Theodoridis; Greece
100 kg	Ömer Arslantaş; Turkey	Ali Dżabr; Egypt	Dionissios Saridis; Greece

=== Men's Greco-Roman ===
Event	Gold	Silver	Bronze
48 kg	Ramiz Çelik; Turkey	Francesco Costantino; Italy	Hassen Ben Lamine Mastouri; Tunisia
52 kg	Chalid al-Faradż; Syria	Remzi Öztürk; Turkey	Salah Belguidoum; France
57 kg	Mohamed Nader Al-Sibai; Syria	Madżdi Mahmud Jusuf; Egypt	Şeref Eroğlu; Turkey
62 kg	Mehmet Akif Pirim; Turkey	Kostas Arkudeas; Greece	Thierry Batien; France
68 kg	Ghani Yalouz; France	Anagnostis Likidis; Greece	Husam ad-Din Hamid; Egypt
74 kg	Martial Mischler; France	Yalçın Karapınar; Turkey	Petros Triantafilidis; Greece
82 kg	Nikolaos Zamanis; Greece	Philippe Nagy; France	Hamza Yerlikaya; Turkey
90 kg	Hakkı Başar; Turkey	Giuseppe Giunta; Italy	Konstantinos Thanos; Greece
100 kg	Olivier Welzer; France	Tahir Yılmaz; Turkey	Giuseppe Giunta; Italy
130 kg	Ali Dżabr; Egypt	Şaban Donat; Turkey	Panajotis Koniarakis; Greece
