= Sebahattin Öztürk (wrestler) =

Turkish wrestler (born 1969)

Sabahattin Öztürk
Personal information
- Nationality: Turkish
- Born: 6 January 1969 (age 57) Sivas, Turkey

Sport
- Sport: Wrestling
- Event: Freestyle
Medal record
Men's freestyle wrestling
Representing Turkey
World Championships
Gold medal – first place	1993 Toronto	82 kg
Silver medal – second place	1994 Istanbul	82 kg
Goodwill Games
Silver medal – second place	1990 Seattle	82 kg
European Championships
Gold medal – first place	1992 Kaposvar	82 kg
Silver medal – second place	1993 Istanbul	82 kg
Bronze medal – third place	1990 Poznan	82 kg
Bronze medal – third place	1991 Stuttgart	82 kg
Mediterranean Games
Gold medal – first place	1991 Athens	82 kg
Gold medal – first place	1993 Languedoc-Rossillon	82 kg
World Espoir Championships
Gold medal – first place	1989 Ulaan-Baatar	82 kg
European Espoir Championships
Silver medal – second place	1988 Walbrzych	82 kg

Sabahattin Öztürk (born 6 January 1969) is a Turkish wrestler. He won the gold medal 1993 World Wrestling Championships. He competed at the 1992 Summer Olympics and the 1996 Summer Olympics.

== Wrestling career ==
Sebahattin Öztürk comes from Sivas and started wrestling there as a teenager. He concentrated on the free style and initially belonged to a wrestling club in Sivas. Later he switched to the big club TEDAS Ankara. He was mainly trained by Riza Keser and Yakup Topuz. At a height of "only" 1.72 metres, the strong athlete always wrestled at middleweight. Sebahattin Öztürk studied sports. He is married and the father of three children. After his wrestling career ended, he ran a sports studio in Sivas. In 2011, he was sentenced by a Turkish court to 13 years and 4 months in prison for various serious offences.

His sporting career began in 1988 when he took part in the European Junior Championships (Espoirs age group) in Wałbrzych. He came 2nd in the middleweight category behind Rustem Kelekshayev from the Soviet Union. A year later he won the world title in Ulan-Bator in the same age group and weight category ahead of Abbas Jadidi from Iran and Nicolae Ghita from Romania.

In 1990 he competed in a senior championship for the first time. He won a bronze medal at the European Championships in Poznań in the middleweight category behind Hans Gstöttner from the GDR and Elmadi Dzhabrailov from the Soviet Union. At the 1990 Goodwill Games in Seattle he came 2nd behind Elmadi Dzhabrailov and ahead of the US American Royce Alger. He did not win a medal, but a good 5th place at the World Championships in Tokyo this year. Surprisingly, the title was won by the Czech Jozef Lohyňa ahead of Royce Alger.

In 1991, Sebahattin Öztürk won another European Championship bronze medal in the middleweight division behind Elmadi Dzhabrailov and Hans Gstöttner. Shortly afterwards, he won the Mediterranean Games in Athens ahead of Alcide Legrand from France and the Military World Championships in Istanbul ahead of Christian Weinert from Germany. He also won a medal, the bronze, at the 1991 World Championships in Varna. Here, only Kevin Jackson from the United States and Jozef Lohyna placed ahead of him.

In 1992 Sebahattin Öztürk then won his first title at an international championship. He became European Champion in Kaposvár/Hungary ahead of Laszlo Dvorak, Hungary and Rustem Kelechsajew. At the Olympic Games in Barcelona, in which he also took part, he naturally hoped to win a medal. But he started there with a defeat against the reigning world champion Kevin Jackson. This was followed by victories over Nergüin Tümennast, Mongolia and Francisco Iglesias, Spain. Further defeats against Rasoul Khadem Azghadi, Iran and Jozef Lohyna, however, threw him back to 6th place.

He was very successful in 1993. First he was runner-up in the European Championships in Istanbul behind Rustem Kazbekovich Kelekhaev, who was now competing for Russia, and then he won the World Championships in Toronto that year ahead of Sagid Katinovassov from Russia, Ruslan Kinchagov from Uzbekistan and Kevin Jackson. This world title was the greatest success in his wrestling career. At the 1994 World Championships in Istanbul, he defeated Hans Gstöttner, among others, by 3:1 points, but lost in the final to the surprise man Luchman Dzhabrailov, a Dagestani competing for Moldova, by 2:4 points and was thus unable to defend his World Championship title. However, winning the World Championship silver medal was a great success.

In 1995 Sebahattin only came 6th at the World Championships in Atlanta. At the Olympic Games in Atlanta, however, he again delivered great fights but narrowly missed out on the medals with a 4th place. He lost in Atlanta in his first fight against Ruslan Kinchagow unhappily with 2:3 points. He then defeated Luis Varela, Venezuela, Hidekazu Yokoyama, Japan, the reigning world champion Luchman Dzhabrailov (with 5:1 points), Wilson Ariel Ramos, Cuba and came to a win without a fight over the injured Elmadi Dzhabrailov. In the decisive fight for a bronze medal, however, he then had to admit defeat to Amir Reza Khadem Azghadi.

Sebahattin Öztürk tried to continue his career in 1997 and 1998, but was repeatedly set back by protracted injuries that prevented him from competing in any more international championships. After the end of his career as a wrestler, the unfortunate events occurred that gave his life a striking turn.
