= Wrestling at the 1991 Mediterranean Games =

Wrestling competition

- Dates: June–July 1991

The wrestling tournament at the 1991 Mediterranean Games was held in Athens, Greece.

== Medal table ==
* Host nation (Greece)

Rank	Nation	Gold	Silver	Bronze	Total
1	Turkey	11	1	0	12
2	France	3	4	1	8
3	Greece	2	5	2	9
4	Yugoslavia	2	4	2	8
5	Egypt	1	1	4	6
5	Syria	1	1	4	6
7	Italy	0	3	5	8
8	Algeria	0	1	0	1
9	Albania	0	0	1	1
9	Spain	0	0	1	1
Totals (10 entries)		20	20	20	60

== Medalists ==
=== Men's freestyle ===
Event	Gold	Silver	Bronze
48 kg	İlyas Şükrüoğlu; Turkey	Felippe Fiumefreddo; Italy	Mohamed El-Messouti; Syria
52 kg	Ahmet Orel; Turkey	Yassin Arabi; Syria	Laureano Atanes; Spain
57 kg	Ahmet Ak; Turkey	Zoran Šorov; Yugoslavia	Umberto Pirrone; Italy
62 kg	Šaban Trstena; Yugoslavia	İsmail Faikoğlu; Turkey	Giovanni Schillaci; Italy
68 kg	Behçet Selimoğlu; Turkey	Sabir Ahmad Hafiz; Egypt	Gérard Santoro; France
74 kg	Turan Ceylan; Turkey	Ioakeim Vasiliadis; Greece	Muhammad al-Chudari; Egypt
82 kg	Sebahattin Öztürk; Turkey	Alcide Legrand; France	Mohamed Zayar; Syria
90 kg	Kenan Şimşek; Turkey	Iraklis Deskoulidis; Greece	Renato Lombardo; Italy
100 kg	Ali Kayalı; Turkey	Kostas Avramis; Greece	Ali El-Sayed Gabr; Egypt
130 kg	Mahmut Demir; Turkey	Dimitrios Vouduris; Greece	Salem Alkin; Syria

=== Men's Greco-Roman ===
Event	Gold	Silver	Bronze
48 kg	Ömer Elmas; Turkey	Yacine Benzaid; Algeria	Sergio Armenise; Italy
52 kg	Khaled Al-Faraj; Syria	Serge Robert; France	Vincenzo Maenza; Italy
57 kg	Patrice Mourier; France	Isaak Theodoridis; Greece	Nader Al-Sobai; Syria
62 kg	Mehmet Akif Pirim; Turkey	Denni Urbinati; Italy	Vojislav Matić; Yugoslavia
68 kg	Ghani Yalouz; France	Nandor Sabo; Yugoslavia	Husam ad-Din Hamid; Egypt
74 kg	Yvon Riemer; France	Željko Trajković; Yugoslavia	Muhammad al-Chudari; Egypt
82 kg	Goran Kasum; Yugoslavia	Martial Mischler; France	Leonidas Pappas; Greece
90 kg	Moustafa Ramadan; Egypt	Pajo Ivošević; Yugoslavia	Iordanis Konstantinidis; Greece
100 kg	Dimitrios Tsekieridis; Greece	Olivier Welzer; France	Sterkaj Paulin; Albania
130 kg	Panagiotis Poikilidis; Greece	Gianluca Vassura; Italy	Franjo Horvat; Yugoslavia
