= 1991 European Wrestling Championships =

- Host city: Germany, Stuttgart(Freestyle); Germany Aschaffenburg(Greco-Roman)
- Dates: 3 – 6 May 1991; 26 – 29 April 1991

Champions
- Freestyle: Soviet Union
- Greco-Roman: Soviet Union

The 1991 European Wrestling Championships were held in the men's Freestyle style in Stuttgart 3 – 6 May 1991; the Greco-Romane style in Aschaffenburg 26 – 29 April 1991.

== Medal table ==
Rank	Nation	Gold	Silver	Bronze	Total
1	Soviet Union	10	5	3	18
2	Germany	4	4	4	12
3	Hungary	2	1	4	7
3	Turkey	2	1	4	7
5	Poland	1	2	0	3
6	Bulgaria	1	1	1	3
7	Sweden	0	2	1	3
8	Czechoslovakia	0	1	0	1
8	Finland	0	1	0	1
8	Israel	0	1	0	1
8	Romania	0	1	0	1
12	France	0	0	2	2
13	Yugoslavia	0	0	1	1
Totals (13 entries)		20	20	20	60

== Medal summary ==
=== Men's freestyle ===
Event	Gold	Silver	Bronze
48 kg	Reiner Heugabel; Germany	Stanisław Szostecki; Poland	Vugar Orujov; Soviet Union
52 kg	Vladimir Toguzov; Soviet Union	Stanislaw Kaczmarek; Germany	Thierry Bourdin; France
57 kg	Bagavdin Umakhanov; Soviet Union	Remzi Musaoğlu; Turkey	Zoran Šorov; Yugoslavia
62 kg	Metin Kaplan; Turkey	Gadzhi Rashidov; Soviet Union	Ralf Lyding; Germany
68 kg	Georg Schwabenland; Germany	Max Geller; Israel	Gérard Santoro; France
74 kg	Alexander Leipold; Germany	Nasir Gadžihanov; Soviet Union	Selahattin Yiğit; Turkey
82 kg	Elmadi Zhabrailov; Soviet Union	Hans Gstöttner; Germany	Sebahattin Öztürk; Turkey
90 kg	Makharbek Khadartsev; Soviet Union	Gábor Tóth; Hungary	Efrahim Kamberoğlu; Turkey
100 kg	Ali Kayalı; Turkey	Andrei Golovko; Soviet Union	Heiko Balz; Germany
130 kg	Andreas Schröder; Germany	Oleg Naniyev; Soviet Union	Mahmut Demir; Turkey

=== Men's Greco-Roman ===
Event	Gold	Silver	Bronze
48 kg	József Faragó; Hungary	Sergey Suvorov; Soviet Union	Nuran Pelikyan; Bulgaria
52 kg	Bratan Tsenov; Bulgaria	Dariusz Piaskowski; Poland	Alfred Ter-Mkrtchyan; Soviet Union
57 kg	Aleksandr Ignatenko; Soviet Union	Marian Sandu; Romania	Rıfat Yıldız; Germany
62 kg	Włodzimierz Zawadzki; Poland	Mario Büttner; Germany	Guennadi Atmakin; Soviet Union
68 kg	Kamandar Madzhidov; Soviet Union	Marthin Kornbakk; Sweden	Attila Repka; Hungary
74 kg	Mnatsakan Iskandaryan; Soviet Union	Tuomo Karila; Finland	Torbjörn Kornbakk; Sweden
82 kg	Péter Farkas; Hungary	Pavel Frinta; Czechoslovakia	Thomas Zander; Germany
90 kg	Pavel Potapov; Soviet Union	Ivaylo Yordanov; Bulgaria	Tibor Komáromi; Hungary
100 kg	Sergey Demyashkevich; Soviet Union	Andreas Steinbach; Germany	Sándor Major; Hungary
130 kg	Alexandr Karelin; Soviet Union	Tomas Johansson; Sweden	György Kékes; Hungary
