= 1992 European Wrestling Championships =

- Host city: Hungary, Kaposvár(Freestyle); Denmark Copenhagen(Greco-Roman)
- Dates: 1 – 3 May 1992; 24 – 27 April 1992

Champions
- Freestyle: CIS
- Greco-Roman: CIS

The 1992 European Wrestling Championships were held in the men's Freestyle style in Kaposvár 1 – 3 May 1992; the Greco-Romane style in Copenhagen 24 – 27 April 1992.

== Medal table ==
| Rank | Nation | Gold | Silver | Bronze | Total |
|---|---|---|---|---|---|
| 1 | CIS | 8 | 3 | 2 | 13 |
| 2 | Germany | 5 | 1 | 2 | 8 |
| 3 | Bulgaria | 1 | 4 | 3 | 8 |
| 4 | Romania | 1 | 4 | 0 | 5 |
| 5 | Turkey | 1 | 2 | 6 | 9 |
| 6 | France | 1 | 1 | 0 | 2 |
| 7 | Poland | 1 | 0 | 1 | 2 |
| 8 | Italy | 1 | 0 | 0 | 1 |
| 8 | Norway | 1 | 0 | 0 | 1 |
| 10 | Hungary | 0 | 3 | 3 | 6 |
| 11 | Sweden | 0 | 1 | 0 | 1 |
| 11 | Switzerland | 0 | 1 | 0 | 1 |
| 13 | Estonia | 0 | 0 | 1 | 1 |
| 13 | Greece | 0 | 0 | 1 | 1 |
| 13 | Yugoslavia | 0 | 0 | 1 | 1 |
| Totals (15 entries) | | 20 | 20 | 20 | 60 |

== Medal summary ==
=== Men's freestyle ===
| Event | Gold | Silver | Bronze |
|---|---|---|---|
| 48 kg | Romica Rașovan; Romania | Vugar Orujov; CIS | Reiner Heugabel; Germany |
| 52 kg | Ivan Tsonov; Bulgaria | Constantin Corduneanu; Romania | Ahmet Örel; Turkey |
| 57 kg | Bagavdin Umakhanov; CIS | Remzi Musaoğlu; Turkey | Rumen Pavlov; Bulgaria |
| 62 kg | Giovanni Schillaci; Italy | Rosen Vasilev; Bulgaria | İsmail Faikoğlu; Turkey |
| 68 kg | Georg Schwabenland; Germany | Boris Budayev; CIS | Valentin Getsov; Bulgaria |
| 74 kg | Məmmədsalam Haciyev; CIS | Valentin Zhelev; Bulgaria | Krzysztof Walencik; Poland |
| 82 kg | Sebahattin Öztürk; Turkey | László Dvorák; Hungary | Rustem Kelejsayev; CIS |
| 90 kg | Makharbek Khadartsev; CIS | Gábor Tóth; Hungary | Kenan Şimşek; Turkey |
| 100 kg | Leri Khabelov; CIS | Heiko Balz; Germany | Ali Kayalı; Turkey |
| 130 kg | Andreas Schröder; Germany | Mahmut Demir; Turkey | Kiril Barbutov; Bulgaria |

=== Men's Greco-Roman ===
| Event | Gold | Silver | Bronze |
|---|---|---|---|
| 48 kg | Lars Rønningen; Norway | Iliuţă Dăscălescu; Romania | Zafar Guliev; CIS |
| 52 kg | Alfred Ter-Mkrtchyan; CIS | Bratan Tsenov; Bulgaria | Remzi Öztürk; Turkey |
| 57 kg | Rıfat Yıldız; Germany | Marian Sandu; Romania | Isaak Theodoridis; Greece |
| 62 kg | Sergey Martynov; CIS | Hugo Dietsche; Switzerland | Jenő Bódi; Hungary |
| 68 kg | Ghani Yalouz; France | Attila Repka; Hungary | Valeri Nikitin; Estonia |
| 74 kg | Mnatsakan Iskandaryan; CIS | Yvon Riemer; France | Erhan Balcı; Turkey |
| 82 kg | Thomas Zander; Germany | Magnus Fredriksson; Sweden | Goran Kasum; Yugoslavia |
| 90 kg | Maik Bullmann; Germany | Ivaylo Yordanov; Bulgaria | Tibor Komáromi; Hungary |
| 100 kg | Andrzej Wroński; Poland | Ibragim Shovjalov; CIS | Andreas Steinbach; Germany |
| 130 kg | Alexandr Karelin; CIS | Ioan Grigoraș; Romania | György Kékes; Hungary |
