= Wrestling at the 1992 Summer Olympics – Men's freestyle 100 kg =

Men's freestyle 100 kg at the Games of the XXV Olympiad
- Venue: Institut Nacional d'Educació Física de Catalunya
- Dates: 3–5 August 1992
- Competitors: 18 from 18 nations

Medalists
| 1st place, gold medalist(s) | | Leri Khabelov | Unified Team |
| 2nd place, silver medalist(s) | | Heiko Balz | Germany |
| 3rd place, bronze medalist(s) | | Ali Kayalı | Turkey |

The men's freestyle 100 kilograms at the 1992 Summer Olympics as part of the wrestling program were held at the Institut Nacional d'Educació Física de Catalunya from August 3 to August 5. The wrestlers are divided into 2 groups. The winner of each group decided by a double-elimination system.

== Results ==
Legend

- WO — Won by walkover

=== Elimination A ===
==== Round 1 ====
| | Score | | CP |
|---|---|---|---|
| Manabu Nakanishi (JPN) | 0–2 Fall | Arvi Aavik (EST) | 0–4 TO |
| Subhash Verma (IND) | 5–0 | Petros Bourdoulis (GRE) | 3–0 PO |
| Heiko Balz (GER) | 1–0 | Kazem Gholami (IRI) | 3–0 PO |
| Gavin Carrow (CAN) | 2–12 | Mark Coleman (USA) | 1–3 PP |
| Kim Tae-woo (KOR) | | Bye | |

==== Round 2 ====
| | Score | | CP |
|---|---|---|---|
| Kim Tae-woo (KOR) | 8–1 | Manabu Nakanishi (JPN) | 3–1 PP |
| Arvi Aavik (EST) | 0–3 | Subhash Verma (IND) | 0–3 PO |
| Petros Bourdoulis (GRE) | 0–4 | Heiko Balz (GER) | 0–3 PO |
| Kazem Gholami (IRI) | 2–0 | Gavin Carrow (CAN) | 3–0 PO |
| Mark Coleman (USA) | | Bye | |

==== Round 3 ====
| | Score | | CP |
|---|---|---|---|
| Mark Coleman (USA) | 0–6 | Kim Tae-woo (KOR) | 0–3 PO |
| Arvi Aavik (EST) | 0–3 | Heiko Balz (GER) | 0–3 PO |
| Subhash Verma (IND) | 3–2 | Kazem Gholami (IRI) | 3–1 PP |

==== Round 4 ====
| | Score | | CP |
|---|---|---|---|
| Mark Coleman (USA) | 9–2 | Subhash Verma (IND) | 3–1 PP |
| Kim Tae-woo (KOR) | 0–4 | Heiko Balz (GER) | 0–3 PO |
| Arvi Aavik (EST) | WO | Kazem Gholami (IRI) | 0–4 EF |

- Arvi Aavik (EST) and Kazem Gholami (IRI) were tied on classification points for fifth.

==== Round 5 ====
| | Score | | CP |
|---|---|---|---|
| Mark Coleman (USA) | 0–3 | Heiko Balz (GER) | 0–3 PO |
| Kim Tae-woo (KOR) | 2–1 | Subhash Verma (IND) | 3–1 PP |

==== Summary ====
| Pos | Athlete | Pld | W | L | R | CP | TP |
|---|---|---|---|---|---|---|---|
| 1 | Heiko Balz (GER) | 5 | 5 | 0 | X (Note: GER 3–0 KOR) | 15 | 15 |
| 2 | Kim Tae-woo (KOR) | 4 | 3 | 1 | X | 9 | 16 |
| 3 | Subhash Verma (IND) | 5 | 3 | 2 | 5 | 11 | 14 |
| 4 | Mark Coleman (USA) | 4 | 2 | 2 | 5 | 6 | 21 |
| 5 | Kazem Gholami (IRI) | 4 | 2 | 2 | 3 | 8 | 4 |
| — | Arvi Aavik (EST) | 4 | 1 | 3 | 3 | 4 | 2 |
| — | Gavin Carrow (CAN) | 2 | 0 | 2 | 2 | 1 | 2 |
| — | Manabu Nakanishi (JPN) | 2 | 0 | 2 | 2 | 1 | 1 |
| — | Petros Bourdoulis (GRE) | 2 | 0 | 2 | 2 | 0 | 0 |

Source: Official Report

=== Elimination B ===
==== Round 1 ====
| | Score | | CP |
|---|---|---|---|
| Sándor Kiss (HUN) | 7–3 | Alioune Diouf (SEN) | 3–1 PP |
| Boldyn Javkhlantögs (MGL) | 0–8 Fall | Andrzej Radomski (POL) | 0–4 TO |
| Miroslav Makaveev (BUL) | 6–5 | Johannes Rossouw (RSA) | 3–1 PP |
| Ali Kayalı (TUR) | 0–2 | Leri Khabelov (EUN) | 0–3 PP |
| Magdiel Gutiérrez (NCA) | | Bye | |

==== Round 2 ====
| | Score | | CP |
|---|---|---|---|
| Magdiel Gutiérrez (NCA) | 0–16 | Sándor Kiss (HUN) | 0–4 ST |
| Alioune Diouf (SEN) | 3–6 Fall | Andrzej Radomski (POL) | 0–4 TO |
| Miroslav Makaveev (BUL) | 1–5 | Ali Kayalı (TUR) | 1–3 PP |
| Johannes Rossouw (RSA) | 1–8 | Leri Khabelov (EUN) | 1–3 PP |

- Boldyn Javkhlantögs (MGL) withdrew due to injury.

==== Round 3 ====
| | Score | | CP |
|---|---|---|---|
| Magdiel Gutiérrez (NCA) | 0–7 Fall | Andrzej Radomski (POL) | 0–4 TO |
| Sándor Kiss (HUN) | 0–5 | Ali Kayalı (TUR) | 0–3 PP |
| Miroslav Makaveev (BUL) | 0–3 | Leri Khabelov (EUN) | 0–3 PO |

==== Round 4 ====
| | Score | | CP |
|---|---|---|---|
| Sándor Kiss (HUN) | 0–6 | Leri Khabelov (EUN) | 0–3 PO |
| Andrzej Radomski (POL) | 3–5 | Ali Kayalı (TUR) | 1–3 PP |

==== Round 5 ====
| | Score | | CP |
|---|---|---|---|
| Andrzej Radomski (POL) | 0–5 | Leri Khabelov (EUN) | 0–3 PO |
| Ali Kayalı (TUR) | | Bye | |

==== Summary ====
| Pos | Athlete | Pld | W | L | R | CP | TP |
|---|---|---|---|---|---|---|---|
| 1 | Leri Khabelov (EUN) | 5 | 5 | 0 | X (Note: Classification points: EUN 6, TUR 3, POL 1) | 15 | 24 |
| 2 | Ali Kayalı (TUR) | 4 | 3 | 1 | X | 9 | 15 |
| 3 | Andrzej Radomski (POL) | 5 | 3 | 2 | X | 13 | 24 |
| 4 | Sándor Kiss (HUN) | 4 | 2 | 2 | 4 | 7 | 23 |
| 5 | Miroslav Makaveev (BUL) | 3 | 1 | 2 | 3 | 4 | 7 |
| — | Magdiel Gutiérrez (NCA) | 2 | 0 | 2 | 3 | 0 | 0 |
| — | Johannes Rossouw (RSA) | 2 | 0 | 2 | 2 | 2 | 6 |
| — | Alioune Diouf (SEN) | 2 | 0 | 2 | 2 | 1 | 6 |
| — | Boldyn Javkhlantögs (MGL) | 1 | 0 | 1 | 1 | 0 | 0 |

Source: Official Report

=== Finals ===
| | Score | | CP |
9th place match
| Kazem Gholami (IRI) | 2–0 Fall | Miroslav Makaveev (BUL) | 4–0 TO |
7th place match
| Mark Coleman (USA) | 2–0 | Sándor Kiss (HUN) | 3–0 PO |
5th place match
| Subhash Verma (IND) | 0–2 | Andrzej Radomski (POL) | 0–3 PO |
Bronze medal match
| Kim Tae-woo (KOR) | 0–2 | Ali Kayalı (TUR) | 0–3 PO |
Gold medal match
| Heiko Balz (GER) | 1–2 | Leri Khabelov (EUN) | 1–3 PP |

== Final standing ==
| Rank | Athlete |
|---|---|
| 1st place, gold medalist(s) | Leri Khabelov (EUN) |
| 2nd place, silver medalist(s) | Heiko Balz (GER) |
| 3rd place, bronze medalist(s) | Ali Kayalı (TUR) |
| 4 | Kim Tae-woo (KOR) |
| 5 | Andrzej Radomski (POL) |
| 6 | Subhash Verma (IND) |
| 7 | Mark Coleman (USA) |
| 8 | Sándor Kiss (HUN) |
| 9 | Kazem Gholami (IRI) |
| 10 | Miroslav Makaveev (BUL) |
