= Bohay =

Bohay is a surname/ Gotra. Notable people with the surname include:

- Gary Bohay (born 1960), Canadian sport wrestler
- Heidi Bohay (born 1959), American actress and television presenter

Bohay surname is also found in Kurukshetra district, Haryana, India, and among the Jats. Like other Jat clans in the state, the Bohay community is traditionally tied to agriculture, farming, and landholding. [1, 2, 3, 4]
