= Elekes =

Elekes may refer to:

- Hungarian name of Șona, Romania
- Endre Elekes (born 1968), Hungarian Olympic wrestler
- György Elekes, Hungarian mathematician
