= Ali Kayalı =

Turkish wrestler (born 1965)

Medal record

Men's freestyle wrestling

Representing Turkey

Olympic Games
Bronze medal – third place	1992 Barcelona	100 kg

World Championships
Silver medal – second place	1993 Toronto	100 kg

European Championships
Gold medal – first place	1991 Stuttgart	100 kg
Bronze medal – third place	1992 Kaposvar	100 kg
Bronze medal – third place	1993 Istanbul	100 kg
Bronze medal – third place	1994 Warsaw	100 kg

Mediterranean Games
Gold medal – first place	1991 Athens	100 kg

Representing Bulgaria

World Championships
Bronze medal – third place	1985 Budapest	90 kg

Ali Kayalı (born 29 January 1965) formerly known as Ali Aliev and later Kamen Tomov is a Turkish wrestler. He was born in Bulgaria. He was Olympic bronze medalist in Freestyle wrestling in 1992.
