= Avirmediin Enkhee =

Mongolian wrestler

Personal information
- Nationality: Mongolian
- Born: 25 June 1961 (age 65)

Sport
- Country: Mongolia
- Sport: Freestyle Wrestling
- Weight class: 62 kg
Medal record
Representing Mongolia
Men's Freestyle wrestling
World Championships
Silver medal – second place	1985 Budapest	62 kg
Bronze medal – third place	1986 Budapest	62 kg
World Cup
Gold medal – first place	1986 Toledo	62 kg
Junior Asian Championships
Gold medal – first place	1981 Hissar-Haryana	65 kg
Aleksandr Medved Grand Prix
Gold medal – first place	1981 Minsk	62 kg

Avirmediin Enkhee (born 25 June 1961) is a Mongolian wrestler. He competed in the men's freestyle 62 kg at the 1988 Summer Olympics.

At the 1985 World Championships Avirmediin Enkhee won the silver medal in the men's freestyle 62 kg. In the final round, he was leading with a score of 4-1 for almost the entire match, but in the last seconds his opponent, the reigning World сhampion Viktor Alekseev of USSR, scored a takedown to grab a 5-4 victory.

At the 1986 USA vs Mongolia Dual in Clemson, USA, Enkhee defeated Joe McFarland 9-4.

At the 1986 Wrestling World Cup Avirmediin Enkhee won the gold medal in the men's freestyle 62 kg, he defeated 1980 World Super Champion Gene Mills of USA.

At the 1986 World Championships Avirmediin Enkhee won the bronze medal in the men's freestyle 62 kg. He loses chance to win gold or silver medal when Joe McFarland of USA beats him 4-3 in the elimination rounds. Enkhee defeated the Asian сhampion Kazuhito Sakae of Japan 4-1 in the Bronze Medal match.
