= Arturo Oporta =

Panamanian wrestler

Personal information
- Nationality: Panamanian
- Born: 26 September 1964 (age 61)

Sport
- Sport: Wrestling

Arturo Oporta (born 26 September 1964) is a Panamanian wrestler. He competed in the men's freestyle 62 kg at the 1988 Summer Olympics.
