= Mehmet Akif Pirim =

Turkish sport wrestler (born 1968)

Personal information
- Nationality: Turkish
- Born: 17 September 1968 (age 57) Rize, Turkey
- Height: 1.60 m (5 ft 3 in)
- Weight: 63 kg (139 lb)

Sport
- Country: Turkey
- Sport: Wrestling
- Event: Greco-Roman
- Club: Ankara Tedaş
- Turned pro: 1988
- Retired: 1999
Medal record
Men's Greco-Roman wrestling
Representing Turkey
Olympic Games
| Gold medal – first place | 1992 Barcelona | 62 kg |
| Bronze medal – third place | 1996 Atlanta | 62 kg |
World Championships
| Silver medal – second place | 1991 Varna | 62 kg |
Mediterranean Games
| Gold medal – first place | 1991 1991 Athens | 63 kg |
| Gold medal – first place | 1993 Languedoc-Roussillon | 62 kg |
| Gold medal – first place | 1997 Bari | 62 kg |
Military World Games
| Gold medal – first place | 1995 Rome | 62 kg |

Mehmet Akif Pirim (born September 17, 1968, in Rize), is a Turkish former Olympic medalist sports wrestler in the featherweight class (62 kg), and currently a trainer. He won the gold medal at the 1992 Olympics in Men's Greco-Roman wrestling and the bronze medal at the 1996 Olympics.

== Wrestling career ==
Born on September 17, 1968, in the Black Sea city of Rize. Mehmet Akif Pirim started wrestling as a teenager in 1984 at the Rize Çaykurspor sports club, concentrating on the Greco-Roman style. He later moved to the renowned Turkish sports club TEDAŞ Spor Kulübü in Ankara. At a height of 1.60 metres, he fought in the featherweight division. During his career, he had quite a few excellent trainers. They were Vayramali Karaali, Osman Destebasi, Gennadi Sapunov, Bilal Tabur, Ömer Suzan, Mehmet Acak, Haluk Koc and Yakup Topuz. Besides wrestling, he studied sports at a university and continued in the clubs Halkbankası, TMO and TEDAŞ Clubs.

His international career began in 1988 when he took part in the Junior World Championships (Espoirs age group) in Wałbrzych/Poland. He came 7th in the bantamweight category. This remained his only start at an international junior championship. He made his debut at an international senior championship in 1991 at the European Championships in Aschaffenburg. He reached the 9th place there in the featherweight category. In the same year, he won the Mediterranean Games in Athens ahead of the Denni Urbinato from Italy. He celebrated his first great success in September 1991 at the World Championships in Varna. He reached the featherweight final, where he was leading 1:0 against Sergei Martynov from the Soviet Union until shortly before the end, but then had to give up a bigger score and lost the fight. He thus became the vice world champion.

At the 1992 European Championships in the Copenhagen, Mehmet Akif Pirim achieved a points victory over the Mario Büttner from Germany, among others, but only finished 7th overall. Well prepared by the new Turkish national coach, the former head coach of the Soviet national team in Greco-Roman wrestling, Gennadi Sapunov, he then competed at the Olympic Games in Barcelona. He came to victories in the featherweight category over Juan Luis Maren Delis, Cuba (3:2 points after overtime), Usama Azis, Sweden (5:0), Stanislav Grigoriev, Bulgaria (2:1), Jenő Bódi, Hungary (7:3) and over the reigning World and European Champion Sergei Martynov, whom he downright outclassed with 13:2 points. He thus became an Olympic champion.

In 1993, Mehmet Akif Pirim competed at the European Championships in Istanbul. He lost his first fight against Sergei Martynov, who took revenge for his clear defeat at the Olympic Games with a clear victory (9:0 points). In the consolation round, however, Mehmet Akif Pirim still managed to win a bronze medal with victories over Alexander Dawidowitsch, Israel, Mchitar Manukjan, Armenia and Georgi Saskavez, Belarus. However, after analysis of the doping samples taken at this championship, he was convicted of doping. He was stripped of the bronze medal he had won and banned until 9 May 1997. In 1995, however, he was pardoned by an inconsistent FILA arbitration court and was able to participate in international championships again 1995.

At the 1995 European Championships in Besançon, he finished 6th in the featherweight division, and at the 1996 World Championships in Prague, where he suffered defeats at the hands of Wlodzimierz Zawadzki of Poland and Mchitar Manukjan, he only came 12th. He did better again at the 1996 European Championships in Budapest, where he came 5th. A better placing was prevented by Sergei Martynow, who won against Mehmet Akif Pirim at this championship. He then presented himself again in excellent form at the 1996 Olympic Games in Atlanta. He lost his first fight there against Ivan Radnev, Bulgaria, because he was still weakened from all the training. Afterwards, strengthened by fluid and food intake, he started a unique winning streak, but with his victories over Winston Santos Fuentos, Venezuela, Hu Guohong, China, Ahad Pazaj, Iran, Mchitar Manukjan, Hryhorij Komyschenko, Ukraine and Koba Guliaschwili, Georgia, he could only win a bronze medal.

In 1997, came the surprising end for Mehmet Akif Pirim as No. 1 in his weight class in the Turkish national wrestling team. He was defeated by Şeref Eroğlu in the Turkish championship and could not get past this wrestler, who became world champion in 1997. At the beginning of 1999, he therefore changed his citizenship and became an Azerbaijani. He then competed for Azerbaijan at the 1999 World Championships in Athens. He managed to beat Emil Budinov, Bulgaria and Christos Gikas, Greece, but then lost to Park Young-shin, South Korea. He only finished 14th with these results and was not considered for any further international championships by the Azerbaijani wrestling federation. His wrestling career was thus over.

== Achievements ==
- 1988 European Espoir Championships in Wałbrzych, Poland – 7th (57 kg)
- 1991 European Championships in Aschaffenburg, Germany – 9th (62 kg)
- 1991 Mediterranean Games in Athens, Greece – gold (62 kg)
- 1991 World Championships in Varna, Bulgaria – silver (62 kg)
- 1992 European Championships in Copenhagen, Denmark – 7th (62 kg)
- 1992 Olympics in Barcelona, Spain – gold (62 kg)
- 1993 Mediterranean Games in Aude, Languedoc-Roussillon, France – gold (62 kg)
- 1995 European Championships in Besançon, France – 6th (62 kg)
- 1995 Military World Games in Rome, Italy – gold (62 kg)
- 1996 European Championships in Budapest, Hungary – 5th (62 kg)
- 1996 Olympics in Atlanta, Georgia, U.S. – bronze (62 kg)
- 1997 Mediterranean Games in Bari, Italy – gold (62 kg)
