= Marian Skubacz =

Polish wrestler (1958–2023)

Personal information
- Nationality: Polish
- Born: 8 April 1958 Ruda Śląska, Poland
- Died: 21 February 2023 (aged 64)

Sport
- Sport: Wrestling

Marian Skubacz (8 April 1958 – 21 February 2023) was a Polish wrestler. He competed in the men's freestyle 62 kg at the 1988 Summer Olympics.

Skubacz died on 21 February 2023, at the age of 64.
