= Mika Lehto (wrestler) =

Finnish wrestler

Personal information
- Nationality: Finnish
- Born: 21 April 1964 (age 62) Helsinki, Finland

Sport
- Sport: Wrestling

Mika Lehto (born 21 April 1964) is a Finnish wrestler. He competed in the men's freestyle 62 kg at the 1988 Summer Olympics.
