= Sándor Kiss (wrestler) =

Hungarian wrestler

Personal information
- Nationality: Hungarian
- Born: 3 June 1962 (age 64) Tura, Hungary

Sport
- Sport: Wrestling

Sándor Kiss (born 3 June 1962) is a Hungarian wrestler. He competed in the men's freestyle 100 kg at the 1992 Summer Olympics.
