= Ko Young-ho =

South Korean wrestler

Go Yeong-ho
Personal information
- Nationality: South Korean
- Born: 14 March 1966 (age 60)

Sport
- Sport: Wrestling

Ko Young-ho (born 14 March 1966) is a South Korean wrestler. He competed in the men's freestyle 68 kg at the 1992 Summer Olympics.
