= Kim Gwang-chol =

North Korean wrestler (born 1969)

Personal information
- Nationality: North Korean
- Born: 5 September 1969 (age 56)

Sport
- Sport: Wrestling

Kim Gwang-chol (born 5 September 1969) is a North Korean wrestler. He competed in the men's freestyle 62 kg at the 1992 Summer Olympics.
