= Paul Farrugia =

Maltese wrestler

Personal information
- Nationality: Maltese
- Born: 5 February 1967 (age 59)

Sport
- Sport: Wrestling

Paul Farrugia (born 5 February 1967) is a Maltese wrestler. He competed in the men's freestyle 62 kg at the 1988 Summer Olympics.
