= Shin Sang-kyu =

South Korean wrestler (born 1968)

Personal information
- Nationality: South Korean
- Born: 2 May 1968 (age 58)

Sport
- Sport: Wrestling

Shin Sang-kyu (born 2 May 1968) is a South Korean wrestler. He competed in the men's freestyle 62 kg at the 1992 Summer Olympics.
