= József Orbán =

Hungarian wrestler

Personal information
- Nationality: Hungarian
- Born: 11 November 1958 (age 67) Győr, Hungary

Sport
- Sport: Wrestling

József Orbán (born 11 November 1958) is a Hungarian wrestler. He competed in the men's freestyle 62 kg at the 1988 Summer Olympics.
