= Ravinder Singh Tut =

British wrestler

Personal information
- Nationality: British
- Born: 23 May 1969 (age 57) Wolverhampton, England

Sport
- Sport: Wrestling

Ravinder Singh Tut (born 23 May 1969) is a British wrestler. He competed in the men's freestyle 62 kg at the 1988 Summer Olympics.
