= Theodore Dikanda =

Swedish wrestler

Personal information
- Nationality: Swedish
- Born: 2 June 1966 (age 60) Lidköping, Sweden

Sport
- Sport: Wrestling

Theodore Dikanda (born 2 June 1966) is a Swedish wrestler. He competed in the men's freestyle 62 kg at the 1988 Summer Olympics.
