= Kim Yeon-man =

South Korean wrestler

Personal information
- Nationality: South Korean
- Born: 1 June 1963 (age 63)

Sport
- Sport: Wrestling

Kim Yeon-man (born 1 June 1963) is a South Korean wrestler. He competed in the men's freestyle 62 kg at the 1988 Summer Olympics.
