= Lázaro Reinoso =

Cuban wrestler (born 1969)

Personal information
- Nationality: Cuban
- Born: December 9, 1969 (age 56)

Sport
- Sport: Wrestling
Medal record
Representing Cuba
Men's freestyle wrestling
Olympic Games
Bronze medal – third place	1992 Barcelona	62 kg
World Championships
Silver medal – second place	1993 Toronto	62 kg

Lázaro Reinoso (born December 9, 1969) is a Cuban wrestler. He was Olympic bronze medalist in Freestyle wrestling in 1992. He won a silver medal at the 1993 World Wrestling Championships.

== International career ==
He is also a bronze medalist for Cuba at the 1992 Olympic Games in Barcelona, Spain. He also won a silver medal at the 1993 World Championships in Toronto, Canada.

== NCAA career ==
Reinoso was an NCAA Division II All-American in 1998, 1999, 2000 and 2001 at Carson Newman.

== Coaching career ==
After completing his university education at Carson Newman University in Tennessee, Reinoso has been a coach at PACE High School in Miami Gardens, Florida.
