= 1970 European Espoirs Wrestling Championships =

- Host city: Sweden, Huskvarna
- Dates: 17 - 23 August 1970

The 1970 European Espoirs Wrestling Championships was the first edition of European Espoirs Wrestling Championships. It was held from 17 April to 23 August 1970 in Huskvarna, Sweden.

== Medal table ==
Rank	Nation	Gold	Silver	Bronze	Total
1	Bulgaria	8	4	2	14
2	Soviet Union	5	3	4	12
3	Yugoslavia	2	3	0	5
4	Romania	2	1	4	7
5	Turkey	1	1	6	8
6	Poland	1	1	1	3
7	Sweden	1	1	0	2
8	East Germany	0	3	2	5
9	Hungary	0	2	0	2
10	Finland	0	1	0	1
11	West Germany	0	0	1	1
Totals (11 entries)		20	20	20	60

== Medal summary ==
=== Men's freestyle ===
Event	Gold	Silver	Bronze
48 kg	Hassan Isov; Bulgaria	Lutz Hartmann; East Germany	Willy Heckmann; West Germany
52 kg	Ibrahim Halilov; Bulgaria	Salim Bak; Turkey	Marian Mlynarczyk; Poland
56 kg	Blagoi Asenov; Bulgaria	Filkovski; Yugoslavia	Nurettin Kurt; Turkey
60 kg	Totcho Khristov; Bulgaria	Dieter Illner; East Germany	Andrei Suba; Romania
65 kg	Spas Angelov; Bulgaria	Muhamed Asenokov; Soviet Union	Mehmet Ayık; Turkey
70 kg	Petar Nedev; Bulgaria	Anatoli Markovich; Soviet Union	Marin Pîrcălabu; Romania
75 kg	Stelian Popescu; Romania	Mintcho Gerganov; Bulgaria	Frank Birke; East Germany
81 kg	Choukri Lutviev; Bulgaria	Géza Molnár; Hungary	Mehmet Öztürk; Turkey
87 kg	Salman Hashimikov; Soviet Union	Georgi Stoichov; Bulgaria	Ömer Suzan; Turkey
+87kg	Soslan Andiyev; Soviet Union	Tontcho Radev; Bulgaria	Mehmet Güçlü; Turkey

=== Men's Greco-Roman ===
Event	Gold	Silver	Bronze
48 kg	Oleg Davidyan; Soviet Union	Czesław Stanjek; Poland	Hristo Vangelov; Bulgaria
52 kg	Marko Mataruga; Yugoslavia	Lajos Rácz; Hungary	Rafael Eirazov; Soviet Union
56 kg	Mihai Boțilă; Romania	Ivan Frgić; Yugoslavia	Mehmet Aslandağ; Turkey
60 kg	Lars-Erik Skiöld; Sweden	Valeri Spiridonow; Soviet Union	Alexander Szabo; Romania
65 kg	Andrzej Supron; Poland	Mikko Huhtala; Finland	Anatoly Bykov; Soviet Union
70 kg	Vjatsheslav Mkrytschev; Soviet Union	Dieter Müller; East Germany	Adrian Florin Papa; Romania
75 kg	Vassil Petkov; Bulgaria	Momir Petković; Yugoslavia	Vladimir Nechaev; Soviet Union
81 kg	Leonid Liberman; Soviet Union	Lars-Erik Nilsson; Sweden	Dimitar Stefanov; Bulgaria
87 kg	Darko Nišavić; Yugoslavia	Dimitar Stoyanov; Bulgaria	Klaus Dünnebeil; East Germany
+87 kg	Mehmet Güçlü; Turkey	Roman Codreanu; Romania	Kalju Ploom; Soviet Union
