= Jörg Helmdach =

German wrestler

Personal information
- Nationality: German
- Born: 28 November 1964 (age 61) Dortmund, Germany

Sport
- Sport: Wrestling

Jörg Helmdach (born 28 November 1964) is a German wrestler. He competed in the men's freestyle 62 kg at the 1988 Summer Olympics.
