= Johannes Rossouw =

South African wrestler

Personal information
- Nationality: South African
- Born: 2 December 1964 (age 61)
- Height: 184 cm (6 ft 0 in)
- Weight: 96 kg (212 lb)

Sport
- Sport: Wrestling
- Club: Victoria Wrestling Club, Pretoria

Johannes "Johan" Hermanus Rossouw (born 2 December 1964) is a South African wrestler. He competed in the men's freestyle 100 kg at the 1992 Summer Olympics.

He later represented Great Britain and was a four-times winner of the British Wrestling Championships in 1996, 1998, 1999 and 2002. His brother Francois was the 1987 middleweight British champion.
