= Dharan Singh Dahiya =

Indian wrestler

Personal information
- Nationality: Indian
- Born: 12 July 1967 (age 59)

Sport
- Sport: Wrestling

Dharan Singh Dahiya (born 12 July 1967) is an Indian wrestler. He competed in the men's freestyle 62 kg at the 1992 Summer Olympics.
