= François Yinga =

Cameroonian wrestler

Personal information
- Nationality: Cameroonian
- Born: 1966 (age 59–60)

Sport
- Sport: Wrestling

François Yinga (born 1966) is a Cameroonian wrestler. He competed in the men's freestyle 62 kg at the 1988 Summer Olympics.
