= Simeon Shterev =

Bulgarian wrestler (born 1959)

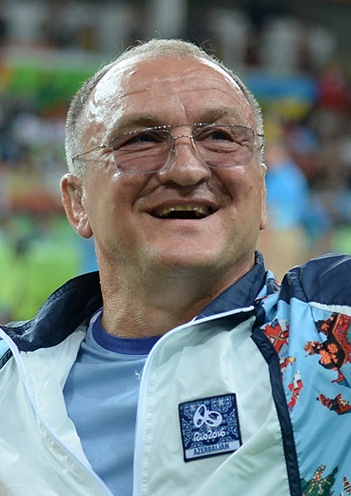
- Shterev at the 2016 Summer Olympics

Medal record

Men's freestyle wrestling

Representing Bulgaria

Olympic Games
Bronze medal – third place	1988 Seoul	62 kg

World Championships
Gold medal – first place	1981 Oslo	62 kg

Simeon Shterev (Bulgarian: Симеон Щерев; born 8 February 1959) is a Bulgarian former wrestler who competed in the 1988 Summer Olympics. Shterev is also currently the coach of multiple Olympic and World Cup medallist Stanka Zlateva.
