= Giovanni Schillaci =

Italian wrestler (born 1967)

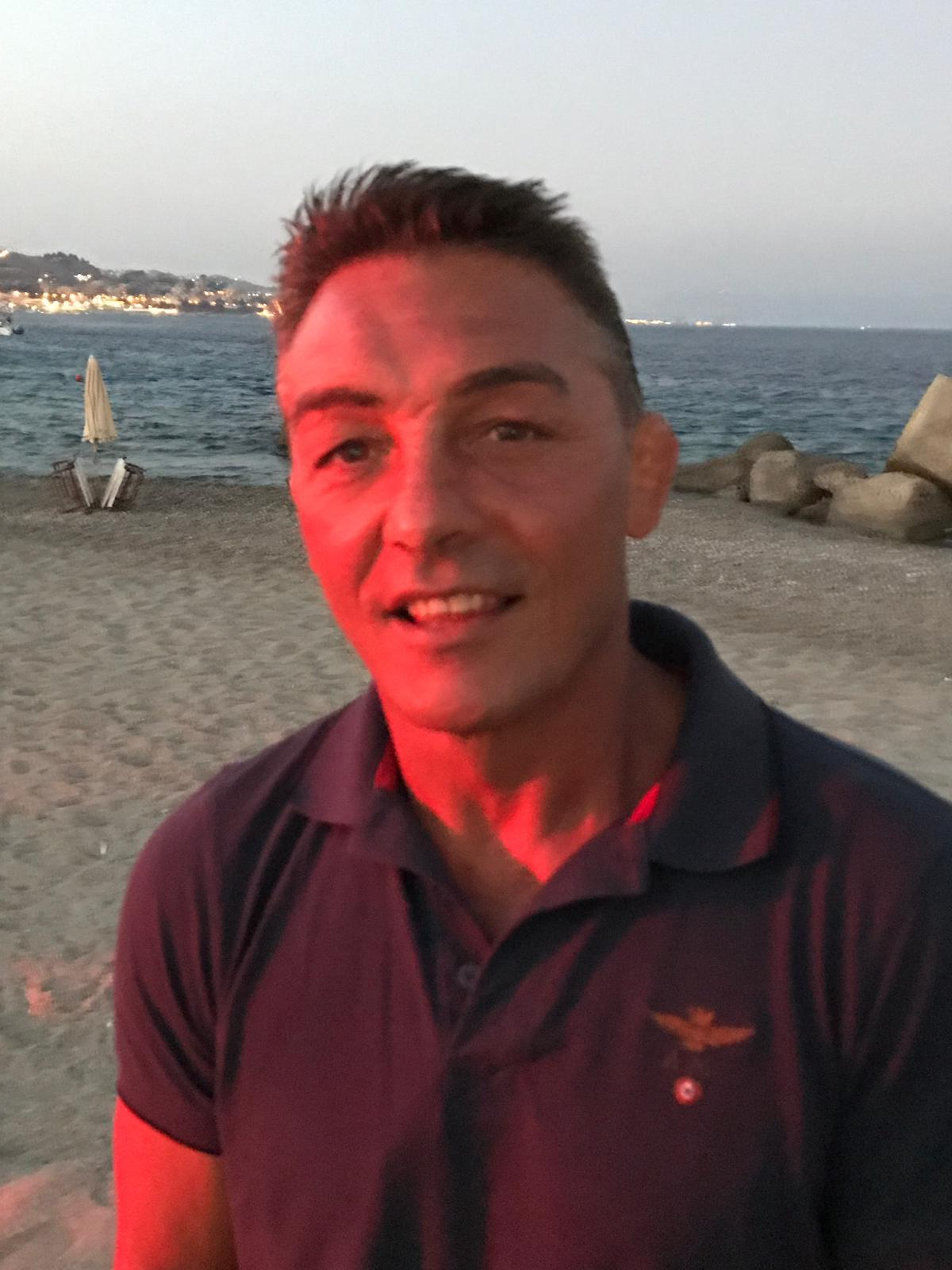

Personal information
- Nationality: Italy
- Born: 3 November 1967 (age 58) Palermo, Italy
- Height: 1.65 m (5 ft 5 in)

Sport
- Country: Italy
- Sport: Wrestling
- Weight class: 62 kg
- Event: Freestyle
- Club: G.S. Forestale
Medal record
Men's freestyle wrestling
Representing Italy
World Championships
Silver medal – second place	1991 Varna	62 kg
Bronze medal – third place	1994 Istanbul	62 kg
European Championships
Gold medal – first place	1992 Kaposvár	62 kg
Silver medal – second place	1996 Budapest	62 kg
Bronze medal – third place	1994 Rome	62 kg
Bronze medal – third place	1989 Ankara	62 kg

Giovanni Schillaci (born 3 November 1967) is an Italian former freestyle wrestler who competed in the 1988 Summer Olympics, in the 1992 Summer Olympics, and in the 1996 Summer Olympics.

== Personal life ==
Schillaci lives and works in Messina, the city in which he married the former Italian-Polish Olympian Katarzyna Juszczak (in 1992 as Polish in Judo and in 2004 as an Italian in freestyle wrestling), and together with whom he trains his daughter the judoka Carolina Costa, also she qualified for the 2020 Summer Paralympics.

== Achievements ==
Year	Competition	Venue	Rank	Event
1987	Mediterranean Games	(Syria) Latakia	1st	Freestyle 62 kg
1988	Olympic Games	(South Korea) Seoul	7th	Freestyle 62 kg
1989	European Championships	(Turkey) Ankara	3rd	Freestyle 62 kg
1991	Mediterranean Games	(Greece) Athens	3rd	Freestyle 62 kg
1991	World Championships	(Japan) Tokyo	2nd	Freestyle 62 kg
1992	European Championships	(Hungary) Kaposvár	1st	Freestyle 62 kg
1992	Olympic Games	(Spain) Barcelona	Elim	Freestyle 62 kg
1994	European Championships	(Italy) Rome	1st	Freestyle 62 kg
1994	World Championships	(Bulgaria) Sofia	3rd	Freestyle 62 kg
1996	European Championships	(Hungary) Budapest	2nd	Freestyle 62 kg
1996	Olympic Games	(United States) Atlanta	6th	Freestyle 62 kg
1997	Mediterranean Games	(Italy) Bari	1st	Freestyle 62 kg
