= Li Xianji =

Chinese wrestler

Personal information
- Nationality: Chinese
- Born: 20 September 1965 (age 60)

Sport
- Sport: Wrestling

Li Xianji (born 20 September 1965) is a Chinese wrestler. He competed in the men's freestyle 62 kg at the 1988 Summer Olympics.
