= Javier Rincon =

Colombian wrestler

Personal information
- Nationality: Colombian
- Born: 15 June 1968 (age 58)

Sport
- Sport: Wrestling

Javier Rincon (born 15 June 1968) is a Colombian wrestler. He competed in the men's freestyle 62 kg at the 1988 Summer Olympics.
