= Jesús Rodríguez (freestyle wrestler) =

Cuban wrestler (born 1967)

Personal information
- Nationality: Cuban
- Born: June 30, 1967 (age 59)
- Height: 171 cm (5 ft 7 in)
- Weight: 73 kg (161 lb)

Sport
- Country: Cuba
- Sport: Freestyle Wrestling
- Weight class: 68 kg
Medal record
Men's Freestyle Wrestling
Representing Cuba
World Wrestling Championships
Silver medal – second place	1994 Istanbul	68 kg
Bronze medal – third place	1995 Atlanta	68 kg
World Cup
Bronze medal – third place	1991 Toledo	68 kg
Pan American Games
Bronze medal – third place	1995 Mar del Plata	68 kg
Pan American Wrestling Championships
Gold medal – first place	1989 Colorado Springs	68 kg
Silver medal – second place	1992 Abany	68 kg
Silver medal – second place	1990 Colorado Springs	68 kg

Jesús Eugenio Rodríguez Garzon (born June 30, 1967) is a retired male wrestler from Cuba, who competed in the freestyle competition during his career. He won a bronze medal at the 1995 Pan American Games for his native country, and competed at the 1992 Summer Olympics in Barcelona, Spain. There he was eliminated in the first round after losses to Israel's Max Geller and Japan's eventual bronze medalist Kosei Akaishi.

== Achievements ==
- 1990 Central American Championship: 68.0 kg Freestyle (1st)
- 1990 World Championship: 68.0 kg Freestyle (3rd)
- 1991 Pan American Games: 68.0 kg Freestyle (4th)
- 1994 World Championship: 68.0 kg Freestyle (2nd)
- 1995 Pan American Games: 68.0 kg Freestyle (3rd)
- 1995 World Championship: 68.0 kg Freestyle (3rd)
