= Andrzej Radomski =

Polish wrestler

Personal information
- Full name: Andrzej Antoni Radomski
- Nationality: Polish
- Born: 30 November 1961 (age 64) Koszalin, Poland

Sport
- Sport: Wrestling

Andrzej Antoni Radomski (born 30 November 1961) is a Polish wrestler. He competed at the 1988 Summer Olympics and the 1992 Summer Olympics.
