= Miroslav Makaveev =

Bulgarian wrestler

Personal information
- Nationality: Bulgarian
- Born: 16 July 1973 (age 53)

Sport
- Sport: Wrestling

Miroslav Makaveev (born 16 July 1973) is a Bulgarian wrestler. He competed in the men's freestyle 100 kg at the 1992 Summer Olympics.
