= Khosro Ghamari =

Iranian cyclist

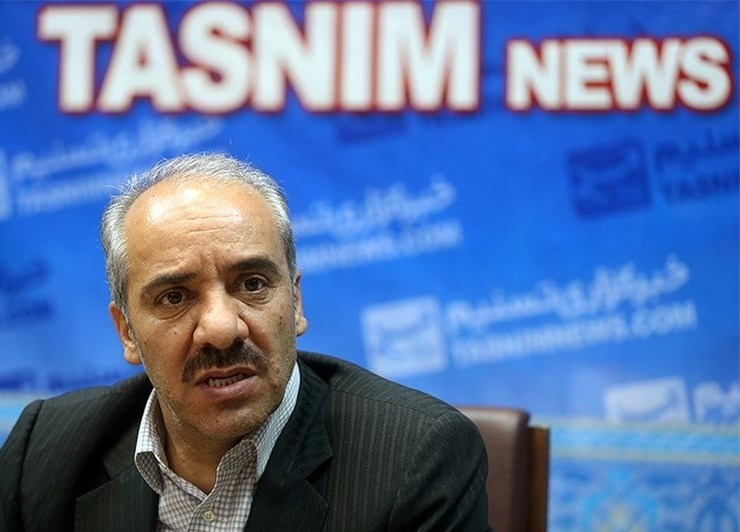
- Khosro Ghamari in 2016

Personal information
- Born: 13 February 1968 (age 58)

Cycling career
- Sport: Cycling

Khosro Ghamari (born 13 February 1968) is an Iranian former cyclist. He competed in two events at the 1992 Summer Olympics.
