= Chris Wilson (wrestler) =

Canadian wrestler (born 1967)

Personal information
- Born: 30 December 1967 (age 58) Winnipeg, Manitoba, Canada

Sport
- Sport: Wrestling
- Events: Freestyle and Folkstyle
Medal record
Men's freestyle wrestling
Representing Canada
World Championships
Silver medal – second place	1991 Varna	68 kg
Bronze medal – third place	1993 Toronto	68 kg
World Cup
Gold medal – first place	1993 Chattanooga	68 kg
Gold medal – first place	1994 Edmonton	68 kg
Commonwealth Games
Gold medal – first place	1994 Victoria	68 kg
Espoir World Championships
Gold medal – first place	1987 Burnaby	68 kg
Collegiate Wrestling
Representing Simon Fraser
NAIA Championships
Gold medal – first place	1989 Jamestown	150 lb
Bronze medal – third place	1988 Tacoma	158 lb

Chris Wilson (born 30 December 1967) is a Canadian former wrestler. One of Canada's top wrestlers for many years, Chris was a 6-time national champion. He won the World Espoir Wrestling Championship in 1987 at 68 kg. While attending Simon Fraser University he was an NAIA champion in 1989 and placed 3rd in 1988. While still at university, Christ created the Power Tour - a motivational platform for high calibre athletes to connect with school aged students.

At the Senior World Championships, Chris placed 2nd in 1991 and 3rd in 1993.He competed in the men's freestyle 68 kg at the 1992 Summer Olympics placing 8th.

In 1994, Chris won a gold medal at the Commonwealth Games.

Chris was inducted into the following Hall of Fames: Simon Fraser University (1994), BC Sports Hall of Fame (1998), NAIA (2000) and Canada Wrestling (2001).

Chris was a city counsellor for the City of Coquitlam for 9 years.

Named the first winner of the Danny Gallivan Fair Play Award in 1992 for demonstrating fair play and the value of sport, Chris was also presented the Johnny F. Bassett Award in 1995 as the Canadian athlete best combining athletic success with strong community values.
