= Ali Dad =

Afghan wrestler

Ali Dad (born 1964) is an Afghan former wrestler, who competed at the 1988 Summer Olympics in the featherweight event, but was suspended after testing positive in a doping test for diuretics.
