= Dariusz Grzywiński =

Polish wrestler

Personal information
- Nationality: Polish
- Born: 31 March 1969 (age 56); Międzyrzecz, Poland

Sport
- Sport: Wrestling

Dariusz Grzywiński (born 31 March 1969) is a Polish wrestler. He competed at the 1988 Summer Olympics and the 1992 Summer Olympics.
