= Tjaart du Plessis =

South African wrestler

Personal information
- Nationality: South African
- Born: 9 July 1967 (age 57)

Sport
- Sport: Wrestling

Tjaart du Plessis (born 9 July 1967) is a South African wrestler. He competed at the 1992 Summer Olympics and the 1996 Summer Olympics.
