= Nima Ebrahimnejad =

Iranian cyclist

Personal information
- Born: 21 February 1969 (age 57)

Cycling career
- Sport: Cycling

Nima Ebrahimnejad (Persian: نیما ابراهیم‌نژاد, born 21 February 1969) is an Iranian former cyclist. He competed in two events at the 1992 Summer Olympics.
