= Ibo Oziti =

Nigerian wrestler

Personal information
- Nationality: Nigerian
- Born: 2 April 1974 (age 52)

Sport
- Sport: Wrestling

Ibo Oziti (born 2 April 1974) is a Nigerian wrestler. He competed at the 1992 Summer Olympics, the 1996 Summer Olympics and the 2000 Summer Olympics.
