= Endre Elekes =

Hungarian wrestler

Endre Elekes (born November 2, 1968) is a Hungarian former Olympic wrestler. He was born in Sfântu Gheorghe, Covasna County, Romania. When he competed in the Olympics, he was 5 ft 8.5 in (174.0 cm), and weighed 154 lb (70 kg).

== Wrestling career ==
His sports club was Csepel SC, Budapest, Hungary.

He came in fifth at the 1991 World Wrestling Championship and sixth at the 1993 World Wrestling Championship in 68.0 kg. Freestyle. He competed for Hungary at the 1992 Summer Olympics in Barcelona at the age of 23 in Wrestling--Men's Lightweight (68 kg), Freestyle, and came in 10th.
