= Mozaffar Ajali =

Iranian weightlifter

Personal information
- Nationality: Iran
- Born: 30 December 1962 (age 62)
- Weight: 105 kg (231 lb)

Sport
- Sport: Weightlifting

Mozaffar Ajali (Persian: مظفر اجلی; born 30 December 1962) is a male Iranian weightlifter. He competed in the 1992 Summer Olympics.
