= 1988 European Espoirs Wrestling Championships =

- Host city: Wałbrzych, Poland
- Dates: 1988

The 1988 European Espoirs Wrestling Championships was the 9th edition of European Espoirs Wrestling Championships was held 1988 in Wałbrzych, Poland.

== Medal table ==
Rank	Nation	Gold	Silver	Bronze	Total
1	Soviet Union	13	4	3	20
2	Hungary	2	0	2	4
3	Turkey	1	3	2	6
4	Poland	1	3	1	5
5	West Germany	1	1	1	3
6	Romania	1	0	2	3
7	Czechoslovakia	1	0	1	2
8	Bulgaria	0	5	5	10
9	East Germany	0	2	1	3
10	Finland	0	1	1	2
11	Greece	0	1	0	1
12	Sweden	0	0	1	1
Totals (12 entries)		20	20	20	60

== Medal summary ==
=== Men's freestyle ===
Event	Gold	Silver	Bronze
48 kg	Romica Rașovan; Romania	Veselin Radev; Bulgaria	Sultan Davudov; Soviet Union
52 kg	Bagavdin Umakhanov; Soviet Union	Ahmet Orel; Turkey	Constantin Corduneanu; Romania
57 kg	Vadim Bogiev; Soviet Union	ürgen Scheibe; West Germany	İsmail Zurnacı; Turkey
62 kg	Gadshi Rashidov; Soviet Union	Dariusz Czarnecki; Poland	Danut Prefit; Romania}
68 kg	Alexander Leipold; West Germany	Andre Backhaus; East Germany	Pashrudin Zalibekov; Soviet Union
74 kg	Saigid Katinovasov; Soviet Union	Marek Grodzki; Poland	Valentin Zhelev; Bulgaria
82 kg	Rustam Kelekhsaev; Soviet Union	Sebahattin Öztürk; Turkey	Krasimir Kostov; Bulgaria
90 kg	Dzhambolat Tedeyev; Soviet Union	Veselin Hristov; Bulgaria	Heiko Balz; East Germany
100 kg	Arawat Sabejew; Soviet Union	Şenol Karagöz; Turkey	Sotir Gotschew; Bulgaria
130 kg	Oleg Naniev; Soviet Union	Kiril Barbutov; Bulgaria	Ferenc Juno; Hungary

=== Men's Greco-Roman ===
Event	Gold	Silver	Bronze
48 kg	Samvel Danielyan; Soviet Union	Jan Ulbrich; East Germany	Piotr Chamera; Poland
52 kg	Nazir Shamshutdinov; Soviet Union	Vassil Botev; Bulgaria	Ömer Esmer; Turkey
57 kg	Ryszard Wolny; Poland	Kamo Ambartzumov; Finland	Imre Simita; Hungary
62 kg	Koba Guliashvili; Soviet Union	Panagiotis Theodoridis; Greece	Stoil Botev; Bulgaria
68 kg	Salih Yılmaz; Turkey	Ayvaz Katshiev; Soviet Union	Sakari Kaakkolahti; Finland
74 kg	Beslan Tshagiev; Soviet Union	Tuomo Karila; Finland	Richard Mateska; Czechoslovakia
82 kg	Pavel Frinta; Czechoslovakia	Aleksander Morosov; Czechoslovakia	Joergen Olsson; Sweden
90 kg	Péter Farkas; Hungary	Peter Petrov; Bulgaria	Georgi Kogouashvili; Soviet Union
100 kg	Ferenc Takács; Hungary	Yury Metelski; Soviet Union	Raymund Edfelder; West Germany
130 kg	Andrey Grishin; Soviet Union	Jerzy Gryc; Poland	Rumen Zaprianov; Bulgaria
