= Eduards Žukovs =

Latvian wrestler (born 1972)

Personal information
- Nationality: Latvian
- Born: 21 January 1972 (age 54) Daugavpils, Latvia

Sport
- Sport: Wrestling

Eduards Žukovs (born 21 January 1972) is a Latvian wrestler. He competed in the men's freestyle 62 kg at the 1992 Summer Olympics.
