= Mohammad Reza Banna =

Iranian cyclist

Personal information
- Born: 5 May 1971 (age 55)

Cycling career
- Sport: Cycling

Mohammad Reza Banna (Persian: محمدرضا بنّا, born 5 May 1971) is an Iranian former cyclist. He competed in two events at the 1992 Summer Olympics.
