= Huang Chien-lung =

Taiwanese judoka (born 1970)

Personal information
- Full name: 黃建龍, Pinyin: Huáng Jiàn-lóng
- Nationality: Taiwanese
- Born: 4 November 1970 (age 55)

Sport
- Sport: Judo
Medal record
Representing Chinese Taipei
Men's judo
Asian Games
| Bronze medal – third place | 1990 Beijing | 65 kg |
Asian Championships
| Bronze medal – third place | 1993 Macau | 71 kg |

Huang Chien-lung (born 4 November 1970) is a Taiwanese judoka. He competed in the men's lightweight event at the 1996 Summer Olympics. He also competed in the wrestling at the 1988 Summer Olympics.
