= Fatih Özbaş =

Turkish wrestler

Personal information
- Nationality: Turkish
- Born: 1 October 1971 (age 54)

Sport
- Sport: Wrestling

Fatih Özbaş (born 1 October 1971) is a Turkish wrestler. He competed in the men's freestyle 68 kg at the 1992 Summer Olympics.
