= Askari Mohammadian =

Iranian wrestler (born 1963)

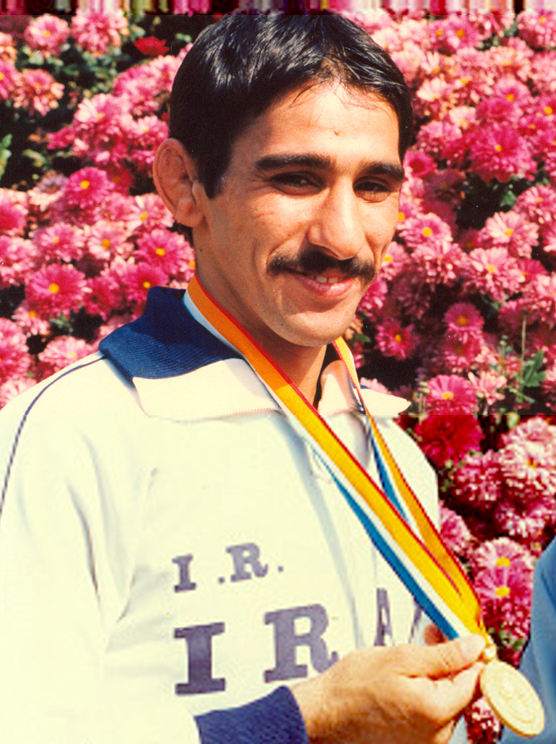

Personal information
- Born: 2 March 1963 (age 63) Sari, Imperial State of Iran
- Height: 170 cm (5 ft 7 in)

Sport
- Sport: Freestyle wrestling
- Coached by: Rahim Tabrizi
Medal record
Representing Iran
Olympic Games
Silver medal – second place	1988 Seoul	57 kg
Silver medal – second place	1992 Barcelona	62 kg
World Championships
Silver medal – second place	1989 Martigny	57 kg
Asian Games
Gold medal – first place	1986 Seoul	57 kg
Silver medal – second place	1982 New Delhi	57 kg
Asian Championships
Gold medal – first place	1983 Tehran	57 kg
Silver medal – second place	1989 Oarai	57 kg

Askari Mohammadian (Persian: عسگری محمدیان, born 2 March 1963) is a retired Iranian freestyle wrestler. He won gold medals at the 1983 Asian Championships and 1986 Asian Games, placing second at the 1982 Asian Games, 1988 and 1992 Olympics, 1989 world and 1989 Asian Championships. His 1988 Olympic silver was the only medal for Iran at those Games.

He is the father of World bronze medalist Mohammad Hossein Mohammadian.
