= Max Geller (wrestler) =

Israeli wrestler

Maksim "Max" Geller מקס גלר
Personal information
- Full name: Maksim "Max" Geller
- Nationality: Israel
- Born: April 20, 1971 (age 55) Minsk, Soviet Union
- Height: 5 ft 7.5 in (171.5 cm)
- Weight: 157 lb (71 kg)

Sport
- Style: Freestyle

Maksim "Max" Geller (Hebrew: מקס גלר; born April 20, 1971) is an Israeli former Olympic wrestler.

Geller was born in Minsk, Belarusian SSR, and is Jewish. He immigrated from the Soviet Union to Israel in the late 1980s.

== Wrestling career ==
Geller's club is Hapoel Tel Aviv, in Tel Aviv, Israel. He won the Israeli championships in 1990 and 1991.

He won the silver medal at the 1991 European Championships, in 68.0 kg. Freestyle.

At the 1992 European Championships, in 68.0 kg. Freestyle, Geller came in 7th.

Geller competed for Israel at the 1992 Summer Olympics, in Barcelona, at the age of 21, in Wrestling—Men's Lightweight, Freestyle. He defeated Jesús Eugenio Rodríguez of Cuba, lost to Fatih Özbaş of Turkey, and then faced Endre Elekes of Romania and both wrestlers were disqualified for passivity. When he competed in the Olympics, he was 5 ft 7.5 in (171.5 cm) tall, and weighed 157 lb (71 kg). He finished in 11th place.

At the 1994 World Championships, in 68.0 kg. Freestyle, Geller came in 11th. At the 1994 European Championships, in 68.0 kg. Freestyle he also came in 11th.
