= Georg Schwabenland =

German wrestler

Personal information
- Nationality: German
- Born: 14 December 1967 (age 58) Hockenheim, Germany

Sport
- Sport: Wrestling

Georg Schwabenland (born 14 December 1967) is a German wrestler. He competed in the men's freestyle 68 kg at the 1992 Summer Olympics.
