= Arvi Aavik =

Estonian wrestler (born 1969)

Personal information
- Born: 31 December 1969 (age 56) Viljandi, then part of Estonian SSR, Soviet Union

Sport
- Country: Estonia

Arvi Aavik (born 31 December 1969, Viljandi) is an Estonian former wrestler who competed in the 1992 Summer Olympics and in the 1996 Summer Olympics.
