= Vicente Cáceres =

Spanish wrestler (born 1967)

Personal information
- Nationality: Spanish
- Born: 1 May 1967 (age 57); Las Palmas, Spain

Sport
- Sport: Wrestling

Vicente Cáceres (born 1 May 1967) is a Spanish wrestler. He competed at the 1988 Summer Olympics and the 1992 Summer Olympics.
