= Rosen Vasilev =

Bulgarian wrestler

Personal information
- Nationality: Bulgarian
- Born: 12 February 1966 (age 60) Smolyan, Bulgaria

Sport
- Sport: Wrestling
Medal record
Men's freestyle wrestling
Representing the Bulgaria
Silver medal – second place	1990 Tokyo	62 kg

Rosen Vasilev (born 12 February 1966) is a Bulgarian wrestler. He competed in 1990 World Wrestling Championships and took the silver medal. the men's freestyle 62 kg at the 1992 Summer Olympics.
