= Ludwig Küng =

Swiss wrestler

Personal information
- Nationality: Swiss
- Born: 17 September 1965 (age 59)
- Height: 1.72 m (5 ft 8 in)
- Weight: 68 kg (150 lb)

Sport
- Sport: Wrestling

Ludwig Küng (born 17 September 1965) is a Swiss wrestler. He competed at the 1988 Summer Olympics and the 1992 Summer Olympics.
