= Gary Bohay =

Canadian wrestler

Personal information
- Born: December 26, 1960 (age 65) Burnaby, British Columbia, Canada
Medal record
Men's freestyle wrestling
Representing Canada
World Championships
Silver medal – second place	1989 Martigny	62 kg
Collegiate Wrestling
Representing the Arizona State Sun Devils
NCAA Division I Championships
Silver medal – second place	1983 Oklahoma City	126 lb

Gary Bohay (born December 26, 1960) is a former Canadian Olympic wrestler. In 1988, he won the gold medal in the Canada Cup, which was considered a warm up for the 1988 Summer Olympics. Following the Cup, he participated in the 1988 Summer Olympic Games in Seoul, South Korea, where he was overall 8th ranked in the world. He was also the 1989 Canada Cup bronze medalist.

Bohay's greatest achievement was a silver medal at the 1989 World Championships in Martigny, Switzerland, where he was defeated in the finals by John Smith of the United States, who was a future two-time Olympic gold medalist and four-time world champion.

During 1983 at Arizona State University, he was an NCAA finalist and named an All-American. Bohay was inducted into the Canada Lutte Hall of Fame in 2001.

Currently, he is a practicing medical doctor in Tucson, Arizona.
