= İsmail Faikoğlu =

Turkish freestyle wrestler (born 1965)

Personal information
- Nationality: Turkish
- Born: 25 August 1965 (age 61)
- Height: 1.65 m (5 ft 5 in)

Sport
- Sport: Wrestling
- Event: Freestyle
- Club: TEDAŞ SK (Ankara)
Medal record
Representing Turkey
European Championships
Bronze medal – third place	1992 Kaposvar	62 kg
Mediterranean Games
Gold medal – first place	1993 Languedoc	62 kg
Silver medal – second place	1991 Athens	62 kg

İsmail Faikoğlu (born 25 August 1965) is a Turkish freestyle wrestler who competed internationally in the 62 kg division.

== Career ==
Faikoğlu represented Turkey at the 1992 Summer Olympics in Barcelona, finishing 11th in men's freestyle 62 kg.

He won the bronze medal at the 1992 European Wrestling Championships in Kaposvar.

He also won the gold medal at the 1993 Mediterranean Games in Languedoc and the silver medal at the 1991 Mediterranean Games in Athens, both in 62 kg freestyle. At the 1993 World Wrestling Championships, he finished fourth, and at the 1991 World Championships he placed sixth.

He was the runner-up at the 1994 Wrestling World Cup and placed fourth in the 1995 edition.
