= Karsten Polky =

German wrestler

Personal information
- Nationality: German
- Born: 14 November 1964 (age 60); Bad Schmiedeberg, East Germany

Sport
- Sport: Wrestling

Karsten Polky (born 14 November 1964) is a German former wrestler. He competed at the 1988 Summer Olympics and the 1992 Summer Olympics.
