= Valentin Getsov =

Bulgarian wrestler (born 1967)

Medal record

Men's freestyle wrestling

Representing Bulgaria

Olympic Games
Silver medal – second place	1992 Barcelona	68 kg

Valentin Dochev Getsov (Bulgarian: Валентин Дочев Гецов; born 14 March 1967 in Ruse, Bulgaria) is a Bulgarian former wrestler who competed in the 1992 Summer Olympics.
