= Martin Müller (wrestler) =

Swiss wrestler

Martin Müller (born 25 July 1966) is a Swiss former wrestler who competed in the 1992 Summer Olympics and in the 1996 Summer Olympics.
