= Georgios Moustopoulos =

Greek wrestler

Personal information
- Nationality: Greek
- Born: 24 April 1971 (age 55) Soviet Union

Sport
- Sport: Wrestling

Georgios Moustopoulos (born 24 April 1971) is a Greek wrestler. He competed in the men's freestyle 62 kg at the 1992 Summer Olympics.
