= Gérard Sartoro =

French wrestler (born 1961)

Personal information
- Nationality: French
- Born: 16 October 1961 (age 64) Auchel, France

Sport
- Sport: Wrestling

Gérard Sartoro (born 16 October 1961) is a French wrestler. He competed at the 1984 Summer Olympics, the 1988 Summer Olympics and the 1992 Summer Olympics.
