= European Wrestling Championships =

International wrestling event

- Status: active
- Genre: sports event
- Date: February – May
- Frequency: annual
- Location: various
- Inaugurated: 1911
- Major events: amateur wrestling
- Organiser: FILA → UWW Europe

The European Wrestling Championships is the second oldest international wrestling competition of the modern world and the main wrestling championships in Europe. It predates World Wrestling Championships and other regional wrestling championships and is second only to the wrestling events at the Olympics. From its inception in 1898 till 1927 only Greco-Roman wrestling was contested. Since 1929 separate freestyle wrestling events were held as well. Since 1970 the two Olympic wrestling styles were contested together during the same unified events. Since 1973 Sambo wrestling was included into the championships programme along with GR and freestyle wrestling (subsequently discontinued and from 1983 contested separately). Since 2014 associated traditional wrestling styles recognized globally by UWW were incorporated into the annual championships schedule.

== Summary ==
Until 2005 there was held separate championships for each wrestling style. First women championships was held in 1988.

=== Pre 1911 ===
No.	Year	City	Country	Date	Venue	Style	Events	Winner
1	1898	Vienna	Austria-Hungary			GR	1 (Open)	Russian Empire
2	1902	The Hague	Netherlands			GR	1 (Open)	Denmark
3	1903	Rotterdam	Netherlands	February 8		GR	1 (Open)	Denmark
4	1904	Amsterdam	Netherlands	January 24		GR	1 (Open)	Bohemia
5	1905	Amsterdam	Netherlands	January 28 – 29		GR	1 (Open)	Netherlands
6	1906	The Hague	Netherlands	January 28		GR	3	German Empire
7	1907	Copenhagen	Denmark			GR	3	Denmark
7	1907	Vienna	Austria-Hungary			GR	1 (Open)	Austria
8	1909	Malmö	Sweden	February		GR	4	Sweden
8	1909	Dresden	German Empire	September		GR	4	German Empire
9	1910	Budapest	Austria-Hungary			GR	3	Denmark

=== Post 1911 ===
No.	Year	City	Country	Date	Venue	Style	Events	Winner
1	1911	Budapest	Austria-Hungary			GR	4	Austria
2	1921	Offenbach	Germany			GR	5	Germany
3	1924	Neunkirchen	Germany			GR	7	Germany
4	1925	Milan	Italy			GR	6	Hungary
5	1926	Riga	Latvia			GR	6	Germany
6	1927	Budapest	Hungary			GR	6	Hungary
7	1929	Paris	France	February		FS	7	Sweden
7	1929	Dortmund	Germany	April		GR	6	Sweden
8	1930	Stockholm	Sweden	March		GR	7	Sweden
8	1930	Brussels	Belgium	May		FS	7	Belgium
9	1931	Prague	Czechoslovakia	March		GR	7	Finland
9	1931	Budapest	Hungary	October		FS	7	Hungary
10	1933	Helsinki	Finland	March		GR	7	Finland
10	1933	Paris	France	November		FS	7	Switzerland
11	1934	Rome	Italy	April		GR	7	Sweden
11	1934	Stockholm	Sweden	October		FS	7	Sweden
12	1935	Copenhagen	Denmark	April		GR	7	Nazi Germany
12	1935	Brussels	Belgium	September		FS	7	Hungary
13	1937	Paris	France	May		GR	7	Sweden
13	1937	Munchen	Nazi Germany	October		FS	7	Nazi Germany
14	1938	Tallinn	Estonia			GR	7	Sweden
15	1939	Oslo	Norway			GR	7	Sweden
16	1946	Stockholm	Sweden			FS	8	Turkey
17	1947	Prague	Czechoslovakia	April 11 – 14		GR	8	Sweden
18	1949	Istanbul	Turkey			FS	8	Turkey
19	1966	Essen	West Germany			GR	8	Soviet Union
19	1966	Carlsruhe	West Germany			FS	8	Soviet Union
20	1967	Minsk	Soviet Union		Minsk Sports Palace	GR	8	Soviet Union
20	1967	Istanbul	Turkey			FS	8	Turkey
21	1968	Västerås	Sweden	June 14 – 16		GR	8	Soviet Union
21	1968	Skopje	Yugoslavia	July 2 – 4		FS	8	Bulgaria
22	1969	Modena	Italy			GR	10	Yugoslavia
22	1969	Sofia	Bulgaria			FS	10	Soviet Union
23	1970	East Berlin	East Germany	June 9 – 14		GR	10	East Germany
23	1970	East Berlin	East Germany	June 9 – 14		FS	10	Soviet Union
24	1972	Katowice	Poland	May 24 – 30	Spodek Arena	GR	10	Soviet Union
24	1972	Katowice	Poland	May 24 – 30	Spodek Arena	FS	10	Soviet Union
25	1973	Losanna	Switzerland	March		FS	10	Soviet Union
25	1973	Helsinki	Finland	June		GR	10	Bulgaria
26	1974	Madrid	Spain	June 21 – 29	Palacio de Deportes	GR	10	Soviet Union
26	1974	Madrid	Spain	June 21 – 29	Palacio de Deportes	FS	10	Soviet Union
26	1974	Madrid	Spain	June 21 – 29	Palacio de Deportes	Sambo	10	Soviet Union
27	1975	Ludwigshafen	West Germany			GR	10	Soviet Union
27	1975	Ludwigshafen	West Germany			FS	10	Soviet Union
27	1975	Ludwigshafen	West Germany			Sambo	10	not contested
28	1976	Leningrad	Soviet Union	April 12 – 23	Yubileyny Sports Palace	GR	10	Soviet Union
28	1976	Leningrad	Soviet Union	April 12 – 23	Yubileyny Sports Palace	FS	10	Soviet Union
28	1976	Leningrad	Soviet Union	April 12 – 23	Yubileyny Sports Palace	Sambo	10	Soviet Union
29	1977	Bursa	Turkey			GR	10	Soviet Union
29	1977	Bursa	Turkey			FS	10	Soviet Union
30	1978	Sofia	Bulgaria	April 22 – 24		GR	10	Romania
30	1978	Sofia	Bulgaria	May 5 – 7		FS	10	Bulgaria
31	1979	Bucharest	Romania	April 16 – 21		GR	10	Romania
31	1979	Bucharest	Romania	April 16 – 21		FS	10	Soviet Union
32	1980	Prievidza	Czechoslovakia	April 20 – 27		GR	10	Soviet Union
32	1980	Prievidza	Czechoslovakia	April 20 – 27		FS	10	Soviet Union
33	1981	Gothenburg	Sweden	April 8 – 11		GR	10	Soviet Union
33	1981	Łódź	Poland	April 23 – 26		FS	10	Soviet Union
34	1982	Varna	Bulgaria	April 17 – 25		GR	10	Soviet Union
34	1982	Varna	Bulgaria	April 17 – 25		FS	10	Soviet Union
34	1982	Varna	Bulgaria	April 17 – 25		Sambo	10	Soviet Union
35	1983	Budapest	Hungary	April		GR	10	Bulgaria
35	1983	Budapest	Hungary	April		GR	10	Soviet Union
35	1983	Budapest	Hungary	April		FS	10	Bulgaria
36	1984	Jönköping	Sweden	April		GR	10	Soviet Union
36	1984	Jönköping	Sweden	April		FS	10	Soviet Union
37	1985	Leipzig	East Germany	April		GR	10	Soviet Union
37	1985	Leipzig	East Germany	April		FS	10	Soviet Union
38	1986	Piraeus	Greece	April 14 – 20		GR	10	Soviet Union
38	1986	Piraeus	Greece	April 14 – 20		FS	10	Soviet Union
39	1987	Veliko Tarnovo	Bulgaria	May		FS	10	Soviet Union
39	1987	Tampere	Finland	May		GR	10	Soviet Union
40	1988	Manchester	UK	April		FS	10	Soviet Union
40	1988	Kolbotn	Norway	May		GR	10	Soviet Union
40	1988	Dijon	France	July		LF	9	France
41	1989	Oulu	Finland	May 5 – 7		GR	10	Soviet Union
41	1989	Ankara	Turkey	May 12 – 14		FS	10	Soviet Union
42	1990	Poznań	Poland	May 6 – 8		FS	10	Soviet Union
42	1990	Poznań	Poland	May 1 – 15		GR	10	Soviet Union
43	1991	Aschaffenburg	Germany	April		GR	10	Soviet Union
43	1991	Stuttgart	Germany	May		FS	10	Soviet Union
44	1992	Copenhagen	Denmark	April 24		GR	10	CIS
44	1992	Kaposvár	Hungary	May 1		FS	10	CIS
45	1993	Istanbul	Turkey	January		GR	10	Russia
45	1993	Istanbul	Turkey	January		FS	10	Turkey
45	1993	Ivanovo	Russia	January	Ivanovo Sports Palace	LF	9	Russia
46	1994	Athens	Greece	April		GR	10	Russia
46	1994	Athens	Greece	April		GR	10	Ukraine
46	1994	Rome	Italy	April		FS	10	Russia
47	1995	Besançon	France	26–30 April		GR	10	Russia
47	1995	Fribourg	Switzerland	8–11 April		FS	10	Russia
48	1996	Budapest	Hungary	21 March		GR	10	Russia
48	1996	Budapest	Hungary	27 March		FS	10	Russia
48	1996	Oslo	Norway	June		LF	9	Russia
49	1997	Kouvola	Finland	May		GR	8	Turkey
49	1997	Warsaw	Poland	May		FS	8	Russia
49	1997	Warsaw	Poland	May		LF	6	France
50	1998	Minsk	Belarus	April	Minsk Sports Palace	GR	8	Russia
50	1998	Bratislava	Slovakia	May		FS	8	Ukraine
50	1998	Bratislava	Slovakia	May		LF	6	Russia
51	1999	Minsk	Belarus	April 15 – 18	Minsk Sports Palace	FS	8	Russia
51	1999	Götzis	Austria	April 24 – May 1		LF	6	France
51	1999	Sofia	Bulgaria	May 13 – 16		GR	8	Russia
52	2000	Moscow	Russia	April 13 – 18	CSKA Arena	GR	8	Russia
52	2000	Budapest	Hungary	April 9	Népstadion	FS	8	Russia
52	2000	Budapest	Hungary	April 9	Népstadion	LF	6	Russia
53	2001	Budapest	Hungary	April		FS	8	Russia
53	2001	Budapest	Hungary	April		LF	6	Russia
53	2001	Istanbul	Turkey	May		GR	8	Turkey
54	2002	Seinäjoki	Finland	April		GR	7	Russia
54	2002	Seinäjoki	Finland	April		LF	7	Russia
54	2002	Baku	Azerbaijan	May 1	Heydar Aliyev Sports Complex	FS	7	Russia
55	2003	Belgrade	Serbia and Montenegro	May 1		GR	7	Russia
55	2003	Riga	Latvia	May 23		FS	7	Russia
55	2003	Riga	Latvia	May 23		LF	7	Russia
56	2004	Haparanda	Sweden	April 8 – 11		GR	7	Ukraine
56	2004	Haparanda	Sweden	April 8 – 11		LF	7	Ukraine
56	2004	Ankara	Turkey	April 23 – 25		FS	7	Russia
57	2005	Varna	Bulgaria	April		GR	7	Russia
57	2005	Varna	Bulgaria	April		FS	7	Ukraine
57	2005	Varna	Bulgaria	April		LF	7	Russia
58	2006	Moscow	Russia	April 25 – 30	Megasport Arena	GR	7	Turkey
58	2006	Moscow	Russia	April 25 – 30	Megasport Arena	FS	7	Russia
58	2006	Moscow	Russia	April 25 – 30	Megasport Arena	LF	7	Russia
59	2007	Sofia	Bulgaria	April 17 – 22	Winter Sports Palace	GR	7	Russia
59	2007	Sofia	Bulgaria	April 17 – 22	Winter Sports Palace	FS	7	Ukraine
59	2007	Sofia	Bulgaria	April 17 – 22	Winter Sports Palace	LF	7	Russia
60	2008	Tampere	Finland	April 1 – 6	Tampere Sports Centre	GR	7	Russia
60	2008	Tampere	Finland	April 1 – 6	Tampere Sports Centre	FS	7	Russia
60	2008	Tampere	Finland	April 1 – 6	Tampere Sports Centre	LF	7	Russia
61	2009	Vilnius	Lithuania	March 31 – April 5	Utenos pramogų arena	GR	7	Russia
61	2009	Vilnius	Lithuania	March 31 – April 5	Utenos pramogų arena	FS	7	Azerbaijan
61	2009	Vilnius	Lithuania	March 31 – April 5	Utenos pramogų arena	LF	7	Russia
62	2010	Baku	Azerbaijan	April 13 – 18	Heydar Aliyev Sports Complex	GR	7	Russia
62	2010	Baku	Azerbaijan	April 13 – 18	Heydar Aliyev Sports Complex	FS	7	Russia
62	2010	Baku	Azerbaijan	April 13 – 18	Heydar Aliyev Sports Complex	LF	7	Russia
63	2011	Dortmund	Germany	March 29 – April 3	Westfalenhallen	GR	7	Russia
63	2011	Dortmund	Germany	March 29 – April 3	Westfalenhallen	FS	7	Russia
63	2011	Dortmund	Germany	March 29 – April 3	Westfalenhallen	LF	7	Ukraine
64	2012	Belgrade	Serbia	March 8 – 11	Kombank Arena	GR	7	Russia
64	2012	Belgrade	Serbia	March 8 – 11	Kombank Arena	FS	7	Russia
64	2012	Belgrade	Serbia	March 8 – 11	Kombank Arena	LF	7	Ukraine
65	2013	Tbilisi	Georgia	March 19 – 24	Tbilisi Sports Palace	GR	7	Russia
65	2013	Tbilisi	Georgia	March 19 – 24	Tbilisi Sports Palace	FS	7	Russia
65	2013	Tbilisi	Georgia	March 19 – 24	Tbilisi Sports Palace	LF	7	Ukraine
66	2014	Vantaa	Finland	April 1 – 6	Trio Arena	GR	8	Russia
66	2014	Vantaa	Finland	April 1 – 6	Trio Arena	FS	8	Russia
66	2014	Vantaa	Finland	April 1 – 6	Trio Arena	LF	8	Russia
67	2016	Riga	Latvia	March 8 – 13	Arena Riga	GR	8	Russia
67	2016	Riga	Latvia	March 8 – 13	Arena Riga	FS	8	Georgia
67	2016	Riga	Latvia	March 8 – 13	Arena Riga	LF	8	Ukraine
68	2017	Novi Sad	Serbia	May 2 – 7	SPC Vojvodina	GR	8	Hungary
68	2017	Novi Sad	Serbia	May 2 – 7	SPC Vojvodina	FS	8	Azerbaijan
68	2017	Novi Sad	Serbia	May 2 – 7	SPC Vojvodina	LF	8	Russia
69	2018	Kaspiysk	Russia	April 30 – May 6	Ali Aliyev Sport Complex	GR	10	Russia
69	2018	Kaspiysk	Russia	April 30 – May 6	Ali Aliyev Sport Complex	FS	10	Russia
69	2018	Kaspiysk	Russia	April 30 – May 6	Ali Aliyev Sport Complex	LF	10	Russia
70	2019	Bucharest	Romania	April 8 – 14	Polyvalent Hall	GR	10	Russia
70	2019	Bucharest	Romania	April 8 – 14	Polyvalent Hall	FS	10	Russia
70	2019	Bucharest	Romania	April 8 – 14	Polyvalent Hall	LF	10	Ukraine
71	2020	Rome	Italy	February 10 – 16	PalaPellicone	GR	10	Russia
71	2020	Rome	Italy	February 10 – 16	PalaPellicone	FS	10	Russia
71	2020	Rome	Italy	February 10 – 16	PalaPellicone	LF	10	Russia
72	2021	Warsaw	Poland	April 19 – 25	Torwar Hall	GR	10	Russia
72	2021	Warsaw	Poland	April 19 – 25	Torwar Hall	FS	10	Russia
72	2021	Warsaw	Poland	April 19 – 25	Torwar Hall	LF	10	Russia
73	2022	Budapest	Hungary	March 28 – April 3	Budapest Sports Arena	GR	10	Azerbaijan
73	2022	Budapest	Hungary	March 28 – April 3	Budapest Sports Arena	FS	10	Azerbaijan
73	2022	Budapest	Hungary	March 28 – April 3	Budapest Sports Arena	LF	10	Turkey
74	2023	Zagreb	Croatia	April 17 – 23	Arena Zagreb	GR	10	Turkey
74	2023	Zagreb	Croatia	April 17 – 23	Arena Zagreb	FS	10	Azerbaijan
74	2023	Zagreb	Croatia	April 17 – 23	Arena Zagreb	LF	10	Ukraine
75	2024	Bucharest	Romania	February 12 – 18	Polyvalent Hall	GR	10	Turkey
75	2024	Bucharest	Romania	February 12 – 18	Polyvalent Hall	FS	10	Turkey
75	2024	Bucharest	Romania	February 12 – 18	Polyvalent Hall	LF	10	Ukraine
76	2025	Bratislava	Slovakia	April 7 – 13	X-Bionic Sphere	GR	10	Azerbaijan
76	2025	Bratislava	Slovakia	April 7 – 13	X-Bionic Sphere	FS	10	Azerbaijan
76	2025	Bratislava	Slovakia	April 7 – 13	X-Bionic Sphere	LF	10	Ukraine
76	2026	Tirana	Albania	April 20 – 26		GR	10	Azerbaijan
76	2026	Tirana	Albania	April 20 – 26		FS	10	Azerbaijan
76	2026	Tirana	Albania	April 20 – 26		LF	10	Ukraine

- FS : Freestyle / GR : Greco-Roman / LF : Women's Freestyle
- Until 2018 : 67 GR, 60 FS, 24 LF

== All-time medal table ==
Updated after the 2026 European Wrestling Championships.

Rank	Nation	Gold	Silver	Bronze	Total
1	Russia	242	98	95	435
2	Soviet Union	230	107	73	410
3	Bulgaria	146	154	175	475
4	Turkey	122	107	167	396
5	Sweden	85	76	85	246
6	Azerbaijan	77	54	77	208
7	Germany	75	113	134	322
8	Ukraine	74	91	123	288
9	Hungary	69	98	105	272
10	Poland	39	68	96	203
11	Armenia	37	31	46	114
12	Finland	35	35	46	116
13	Georgia	34	55	97	186
14	Romania	33	83	93	209
15	France	29	32	74	135
16	Belarus	21	60	72	153
17	United World Wrestling (Note: At the 2025 European Championships, in accordance with sanctions imposed following by the 2022 Russian invasion of Ukraine, wrestlers from Russia and Belarus were not permitted to use the name, flag, or anthem of Russia or Belarus. They instead participated as "United World Wrestling (UWW)", their medals were not included in the official medal table.)	19	9	21	49
18	East Germany	16	38	40	94
19	Norway	14	18	21	53
20	Italy	14	16	42	72
21	Yugoslavia	12	13	15	40
22	Greece	9	21	27	57
23	Moldova	9	19	35	63
24	Switzerland	8	14	10	32
25	Slovakia	8	6	12	26
26	CIS	8	3	2	13
27	Estonia	6	14	13	33
28	Serbia	5	7	14	26
29	Austria	5	7	11	23
30	Denmark	5	7	4	16
31	Latvia	5	5	8	18
–	Individual Neutral Athletes (Note: At the 2024 European Championships, in accordance with sanctions imposed following by the 2022 Russian invasion of Ukraine, wrestlers from Russia and Belarus were not permitted to use the name, flag, or anthem of Russia or Belarus. They instead participated as "Individual Neutral Athletes (AIN)", their medals were not included in the official medal table.)	5	4	11	20
32	Czechoslovakia	4	11	32	47
33	Belgium	4	11	5	20
34	Albania	2	5	3	10
35	North Macedonia	2	0	5	7
36	Czech Republic	1	3	8	12
37	San Marino	1	3	1	5
38	Egypt	1	1	2	4
39	Israel	0	7	5	12
40	Great Britain	0	4	4	8
41	Iran	0	4	1	5
42	Lithuania	0	2	7	9
43	Spain	0	1	7	8
44	Netherlands	0	1	4	5
45	Monaco	0	1	0	1
46	Croatia	0	0	8	8
47	Slovenia	0	0	1	1
Totals (47 entries)		1,511	1,517	1,937	4,965

== Youth Wrestling ==
=== European Espoirs Wrestling Championships (U20) ===
The European Espoirs Wrestling Championships is main wrestling championships in Europe.

Edition	Year	Host city	Host country	Events
1	1970	Huskvarna	Sweden	20
2	1972	Hvar	Yugoslavia	20
3	1974	Haparanda	Sweden	20
4	1976	Poznań	Poland	20
5	1978	Oulu	Finland	20
6	1982	Leipzig	East Germany	20
7	1984	Slaghaven	Denmark (LL)	10
7	1984	Fredrikshavn	Denmark (GR)	10
8	1986	Lidköping	Sweden (LL)	10
8	1986	Malmö	Sweden (GR)	10
9	1988	Wałbrzych	Poland	20
10	1990	Unknown	Unknown	20
11	1992	Szekesfehervar	Hungary	20
12	1994	Kuortane	Finland (LL)	10
12	1994	Istanbul	Turkey (GR)	10

LL : Freestyle / GR : Greco-Roman / LF : Women's Freestyle

=== European Juniors Wrestling Championship (U20) ===
The European Juniors Wrestling Championships is main wrestling championships in Europe.

Edition	Year	Host city	Host country	Events
1	1980	Bursa	Turkey	20
2	1981	Unknown	Unknown (GR)	10
3	1984	Łódź	Poland	20
4	1985	Bologna	Italy	20
5	1987	Katowice	Poland	20
6	1989	Bursa	Turkey (LL)	10
6	1989	Witten	Germany (GR)	10
7	1991	Istanbul	Turkey (LL)	10
8	1993	Goetzis	Austria	20
9	1995	Witten	Germany (LL, GR)	20
9	1995	Klippan	Sweden (LF)	7
10	1996	Sofia	Bulgaria (LL, GR)	20
10	1996	Rodby	Denmark (LF)	8
11	1997	Istanbul	Turkey (LL, GR)	20
11	1997	Hradec Králové	Czech Republic (LF)	8
12	1998	Radovis	North Macedonia (LL)	10
12	1998	Tirana	Albania (GR)	10
12	1998	Patras	Greece (LF)	8
13	1999	Budapest	Hungary (GR, LF)	17
13	1999	Riga	Latvia (LL)	9
14	2000	Sofia	Bulgaria	26
15	2002	Tirana	Albania (LL, LF)	17
15	2002	Subotica	Yugoslavia (GR)	9

Edition	Year	Host city	Host country	Events
16	2004	Sofia	Bulgaria (LL, LF)	16
16	2004	Murska Sobota	Slovenia (GR)	8
17	2005	Wrocław	Poland	24
18	2006	Szombathely	Hungary	24
19	2007	Belgrade	Serbia	24
20	2008	Košice	Slovakia	24
21	2009	Tbilisi	Georgia	24
22	2010	Samokov	Bulgaria	24
23	2011	Zrenjanin	Serbia	24
24	2012	Zagreb	Croatia	24
25	2013	Skopje	North Macedonia	24
26	2014	Warsaw	Poland	24
27	2015	Istanbul	Turkey	24
28	2016	Bucharest	Romania	24
29	2017	Dortmund	Germany	24
30	2018	Rome	Italy	30
31	2019	Pontevedra	Spain	30
32	2021	Dortmund	Germany	30
33	2022	Rome	Italy	30
34	2023	Santiago de Compostela	Spain	30
35	2024	Novi Sad	Serbia	31
36	2025	Caorle	Italy	

LL : Freestyle / GR : Greco-Roman / LF : Women's Freestyle

=== European Cadets Wrestling Championship (U17) ===
The European Cadets Wrestling Championships is main wrestling championships in Europe.

Edition	Year	Host city	Host country	Events
1	1986	Bursa	Turkey	26
2	1988	İzmir	Turkey	22
3	2000	Bratislava	Slovakia	30
4	2001	İzmir	Turkey	30
5	2002	Vilnius	Lithuania (LL)	10
5	2002	Odesa	Ukraine (GR)	10
5	2002	Albena	Bulgaria (LF)	10
6	2003	Skopje	North Macedonia (LL)	10
6	2003	Rostov-on-Don	Russia (GR)	10
6	2003	Sevilla	Spain (LF)	10
7	2004	Albena	Bulgaria (GR, LF)	20
7	2004	Istanbul	Turkey (LL)	10
8	2005	Tirana	Albania	30
9	2006	Istanbul	Turkey	30
10	2007	Warsaw	Poland	30
11	2008	Daugavpils	Latvia	30
12	2009	Zrenjanin	Serbia	30
13	2010	Sarajevo	Bosnia and Herzegovina	30
14	2011	Warsaw	Poland	30
15	2012	Katowice	Poland	30
16	2013	Bar	Montenegro	30
17	2014	Samokov	Bulgaria	30
18	2015	Subotica	Serbia	30
19	2016	Stockholm	Sweden	30
20	2017	Sarajevo	Bosnia and Herzegovina	30
21	2018	Skopje	North Macedonia	30
22	2019	Faenza	Italy	30
23	2021	Samokov	Bulgaria	30
24	2022	Bucharest	Romania	30
25	2023	Tirana	Albania	30
26	2024	Novi Sad	Serbia	31
27	2025	Skopje	North Macedonia	

LL : Freestyle / GR : Greco-Roman / LF : Women's Freestyle

=== European Schools Wrestling Championship (U15) ===
The European Schools Wrestling Championships is main wrestling championships in Europe.

Edition	Year	Host city	Host country	Events
1	2017	Belgrade	Serbia	30
2	2018	Győr	Hungary	30
3	2019	Kraków	Poland	30
4	2021	Sofia	Bulgaria	30
5	2022	Zagreb	Croatia	30
6	2023	Kaposvár	Hungary	30
7	2024	Loutraki	Greece	

== Traditional wrestling ==
Traditional wrestling includes:

=== European Sambo Championships ===
Among the decisions taken during the 1973 FILA Congress, held under the FILA President Milan Ercegan, Sambo, a special form of wrestling particularly practised in the USSR and Asia, was recognized. Among the decisions taken during the Congress, Sambo for the first time was included in the programme of the 1974 European Wrestling Championships (along with GR and freestyle.) During the Congress, the attribution of the next freestyle wrestling, Greco-Roman wrestling and Sambo championships was decided as follows: European Championships: 1974 at Madrid (Spain,) 1975 at Ludwigshafen (West Germany,) 1976 in Turkey. World Championships: 1974 at Tehran. Junior European Championships: 1974 at Poznań (Poland.) Junior World Championships: 1973 at Miami (USA.) After the Soviet invasion of Afghanistan, anti-Soviet international sentiment led to a discontinuation of Sambo from the Championships programme.

=== European Grappling Championships ===
The European Grappling Championships (GP) is main traditional wrestling championships in Europe.

Edition	Year	Host venue	Events
1	2015	Sassari, Italy	26
2	2016	Rome, Italy	26
3	2017	Novi Sad, Serbia	26
4	2018	Kaspiysk, Russia	26

=== European Pankration Championships ===
The European Pankration Championships (PK) is main traditional wrestling championships in Europe.

Edition	Year	Host venue	Events
1	2014	Bucharest, Romania	
2	2015	(Georgia (country)) Tbilisi, Georgia	
3	2016	Budapest, Hungary	
4	2017	Brindisi, Italy	
5	2018	Zrenjanin, Serbia	

=== European Alysh Championships ===
The European Alysh Championships (Belt Wrestling Alysh or BWUWW or AL) is main traditional wrestling championships in Europe.

Edition	Year	Host venue	Events
1	2014	Liepāja, Latvia	
2	2017	Novi Sad, Serbia	4
3	2018	Zrenjanin, Serbia	

=== European Pahlavani Championships ===
The European Pahlavani Championships (Pahlavani Wrestling or PW) is main traditional wrestling championships in Europe.

Edition	Year	Host venue	Events
1	2017	Novi Sad, Serbia	
2	2019		

=== European Kazak Kuresi Championships ===
The European Kazak Kuresi Championships (Kazakh Wrestling or KK) is main traditional wrestling championships in Europe.

Edition	Year	Host venue	Events
1	2014	Liepāja, Latvia	
2	2017	Novi Sad, Serbia	

=== European Beach Wrestling Championships ===
The European Beach Wrestling Championships (BW) is main traditional wrestling championships in Europe.

- Until 2018 no competition.

== See also ==
- World Wrestling Championships (formerly FILA Wrestling World Championships)
- European U23 Wrestling Championships
