= List of Pan American Games medalists in wrestling =

This is the complete list of Pan American Games medalists in wrestling from 1951 to 2019.

== Men's freestyle ==
=== Freestyle (– 48 kg) ===
Games	Gold	Silver	Bronze
1971	Sergio Gonzalez; United States	Miguel Alonso; Cuba	Oscar Luña; Venezuela
1975	Jorge Frias; Mexico	David Cowan; United States	Miguel Alonso; Cuba
1979	William Rosado; United States	Miguel Alonso; Cuba	Alfredo Olvera; Mexico
1983	Cristóbal González; Cuba	Richi Salamone; United States	Carlos Villalta; Venezuela
1987	Aldo Martínez; Cuba	Tim Vanni; United States	William Delgado; Colombia
1991	Aldo Martínez; Cuba	José Sabino; Dominican Republic	Tim Vanni; United States
1995	Alexis Vila; Cuba	Paul Ragusa; Canada	Tim Vanni; United States

=== Freestyle (– 52 kg) ===
Games	Gold	Silver	Bronze
1951	Hugh Peery; United States	Manuel Varela; Argentina	Rodolfo Dávila; Mexico
1955	Manuel Varela; Argentina	Nicolás Basurto; Mexico	Michael Krishart; United States
1959	Dick Wilson; United States	Jorge Rosado; Mexico	Manuel Varela; Argentina
1963	Andy Fitch; United States	Jorge Rosado; Mexico	Carlos Zapata; Venezuela
1967	Richard Sofman; United States	Wanelge Castillo; Panama	Florentino Martínez; Mexico
1971	Miguel Tachín; Cuba	Florentino Martínez; Mexico	Wanelge Castillo; Panama
1975	Eloy Abreu; Cuba	James Haines; United States	Julio Gómez; Mexico
1979	Gene Mills; United States	Luis Ocaña; Cuba	Jorge Olvera; Mexico
1983	Ray Takahashi; Canada	Charles Heard; United States	Alejandro Puerto; Cuba
1987	Carlos Varela González; Cuba	Greg Robbins; United States	Chris Woodcroft; Canada
1991	Carlos Varela González; Cuba	Bernardo Olvera; Mexico	Zeke Jones; United States
1995	Zeke Jones; United States	Carlos Varela González; Cuba	Tam Selwyn; Canada

=== Freestyle (– 54 kg) ===
Games	Gold	Silver	Bronze
1999	Wilfredo García; Cuba	Paul Ragusa; Canada	Eric Akin; United States

=== Freestyle (– 55 kg) ===
Games	Gold	Silver	Bronze
2003	Stephen Abas; United States	René Montero; Cuba	Mikheil Japaridze; Canada
2007	Henry Cejudo; United States	Andy Moreno; Cuba	Cristian Roberty; Venezuela
2007	Henry Cejudo; United States	Andy Moreno; Cuba	Fredy Serrano; Colombia
2011	Juan Ramírez Beltré; Dominican Republic	Obe Blanc; United States	Steven Takahashi; Canada
2011	Juan Ramírez Beltré; Dominican Republic	Obe Blanc; United States	Juan Valverde; Ecuador

=== Freestyle (– 57 kg) ===
Games	Gold	Silver	Bronze
1951	Richard LeMeyre; United States	Adolfo Díaz; Argentina	Leonardo Basurto; Mexico
1955	Jack Blubaugh; United States	Adolfo Díaz; Argentina	Leonardo Basurto; Mexico
1959	David Auble; United States	Eduardo Campbell; Panama	Héctor Iriarte; Guatemala
1963	William Riddle; United States	Eduardo Campbell; Panama	Ernest Chornomydz; Canada
1967	Rick Sanders; United States	Moisés López; Mexico	José Ramos; Cuba
1971	Donald Behm; United States	Jorge Ramos; Cuba	Eduardo Maggiolo; Argentina
1975	Jorge Ramos; Cuba	Moisés López; Mexico	Mark Massery; United States
1979	Joe Corso; United States	Juan Carlos Rodríguez; Cuba	José Pinto; Panama
1983	Barry Davis; United States	Rafael Torres; Cuba	Orlando Cáceres; Puerto Rico
1987	Alejandro Puerto; Cuba	Robert Dawson; Canada	Jorge Olivera; Mexico
1991	Brad Penrith; United States	Alejandro Puerto; Cuba	Robert Dawson; Canada
1995	Terry Brands; United States	Robert Dawson; Canada	Alejandro Puerto; Cuba
2015	Yowlys Bonne; Cuba	Angel Escobedo; United States	Emir Hernandez; Colombia
2015	Yowlys Bonne; Cuba	Angel Escobedo; United States	Pedro Mejías; Venezuela
2019	Daton Fix; United States	Juan Rubelín Ramírez; Dominican Republic	Reineri Andreu; Cuba
2019	Daton Fix; United States	Juan Rubelín Ramírez; Dominican Republic	Darthe Capellan; Canada

=== Freestyle (– 58 kg) ===
Games	Gold	Silver	Bronze
1999	Guivi Sissaouri; Canada	Eric Guerrero; United States	Yoendri Albear Ferrer; Cuba

=== Freestyle (– 60 kg) ===
Games	Gold	Silver	Bronze
2003	Yandro Quintana; Cuba	Guivi Sissaouri; Canada	Eric Guerrero; United States
2007	Yandro Quintana; Cuba	Mike Zadick; United States	Tomas Solorzano; Venezuela
2007	Yandro Quintana; Cuba	Mike Zadick; United States	Aldo Parimango; Peru
2011	Franklin Gómez; Puerto Rico	Guillermo Torres; Mexico	Yowlys Bonne; Cuba
2011	Franklin Gómez; Puerto Rico	Guillermo Torres; Mexico	Luis Isaias Portillo; El Salvador

=== Freestyle (– 62 kg) ===
Games	Gold	Silver	Bronze
1951	Omar Blebel; Argentina	Gerald Maurey; United States	Guillermo Palomino; Mexico
1955	Omar Blebel; Argentina	Alan Rice; United States	José Yañez; Cuba
1959	Louis Giani; United States	Roberto Vallejo; Mexico	Ralph Caspesson; Canada
1971	David Pruzansky; United States	Francisco Ramos; Cuba	Patrick Bolger; Canada
1975	Egon Beiler; Canada	José Ramos; Cuba	James Humphrey; United States
1979	Andre Metzger; United States	Raúl Cascaret; Cuba	John Park; Canada
1983	Randy Lewis; United States	Rey Esteban Ramírez; Cuba	Bob Robinson; Canada
1987	John Smith; United States	Joe Domarchuk; Canada	Enrique Valdés; Cuba
1991	John Smith; United States	Anibál Nieves; Puerto Rico	Lázaro Reinoso; Cuba
1995	Tom Brands; United States	Anibál Nieves; Puerto Rico	Carlos Julián Ortiz; Cuba

=== Freestyle (– 63 kg) ===
Games	Gold	Silver	Bronze
1963	Ronald Finley; United States	Matti Jutila; Canada	Mario Tovar; Mexico
1967	Michael Young; United States	Roberto Vallejo; Mexico	Francisco Ramos; Cuba
1999	Cary Kolat; United States	Carlos Julián Ortiz; Cuba	Marty Calder; Canada

=== Freestyle (– 65 kg) ===
Games	Gold	Silver	Bronze
2015	Brent Metcalf; United States	Franklin Marén; Cuba	Haislan Garcia; Canada
2015	Brent Metcalf; United States	Franklin Marén; Cuba	Franklin Gómez; Puerto Rico
2019	Alejandro Valdés; Cuba	Álbaro Rudesindo; Dominican Republic	Mauricio Sánchez; Ecuador
2019	Alejandro Valdés; Cuba	Álbaro Rudesindo; Dominican Republic	Jaydin Eierman; United States

=== Freestyle (– 66 kg) ===
Games	Gold	Silver	Bronze
2003	Serguei Rondón; Cuba	Edison Hurtado; Colombia	Jamill Kelly; United States
2007	Geandry Garzón; Cuba	Edison Hurtado; Colombia	Doug Schwab; United States
2007	Geandry Garzón; Cuba	Edison Hurtado; Colombia	Pedro Soto; Puerto Rico
2011	Liván López; Cuba	Pedro Soto; Puerto Rico	Teyon Ware; United States
2011	Liván López; Cuba	Pedro Soto; Puerto Rico	Yoan Blanco; Ecuador

=== Freestyle (– 67 kg) ===
Games	Gold	Silver	Bronze
1951	Newton Copple; United States	Osvaldo Blasi; Argentina	José Luis Pérez; Mexico
1955	Jay Thomas Evans; United States	Juan Rolón; Argentina	Mario Tovar; Mexico
1959	James Burke; United States	Mario Tovar; Mexico	José Yañez; Cuba

=== Freestyle (– 68 kg) ===
Games	Gold	Silver	Bronze
1971	Dan Gable; United States	José Ramos; Cuba	Segundo Olmedo; Panama
1975	Lloyd Keaser; United States	Clive Llewellyn; Canada	Daniel Pozo; Cuba
1979	Andrew Rein; United States	José Ramos; Cuba	Egon Beiler; Canada
1983	Raúl Cascaret; Cuba	Lenny Zalesky; United States	Pat Sullivan; Canada
1987	Andre Metzger; United States	Eugenio Montero; Cuba	Pat Sullivan; Canada
1991	Townsend Saunders; United States	Daniel Navarrete; Argentina	José Díaz; Venezuela
1995	Townsend Saunders; United States	Craig Roberts; Canada	Jesús Eugenio Rodríguez; Cuba

=== Freestyle (– 69 kg) ===
Games	Gold	Silver	Bronze
1999	Lincoln McIlravy; United States	Yosvany Sánchez; Cuba	Daniel Igali; Canada

=== Freestyle (– 70 kg) ===
Games	Gold	Silver	Bronze
1963	Gregory Ruth; United States	José Azzari; Guatemala	Kurt Boese; Canada
1967	Gerald Bell; United States	Ray Lougheed; Canada	Severino Aguilar; Panama

=== Freestyle (– 73 kg) ===
Games	Gold	Silver	Bronze
1951	Melvin Northrup; United States	Alberto Longarella; Argentina	José López; Cuba
1955	Alberto Longarella; Argentina	Melvin Nothrup; United States	Antonio Rosado; Mexico
1959	Douglas Blubaugh; United States	Bruno Ochman; Canada	Antonio Rosado; Mexico

=== Freestyle (– 74 kg) ===
Games	Gold	Silver	Bronze
1971	Francisco Lebeque; Cuba	Wayne Wells; United States	Nestor González; Argentina
1975	Francisco Lebeque; Cuba	Carl Adams; United States	James Miller; Canada
1979	Leroy Kemp; United States	Daniel Pozo; Cuba	Marc Mongeon; Canada
1983	Leroy Kemp; United States	Candelario Ruiz; Cuba	Ken Bradford; Canada
1987	David Schultz; United States	Raúl Cascaret; Cuba	Gary Holmes; Canada
1991	Kenny Monday; United States	Felipe Guzmán; Mexico	Alberto Rodríguez; Cuba
1995	Alberto Rodríguez; Cuba	David Hohl; Canada	David Schultz; United States
2003	Joe Williams; United States	Zoltan Hunyady; Canada	Daniel Aguillera; Cuba
2007	Iván Fundora; Cuba	Joseph Heskett; United States	Wilson Medina; Colombia
2007	Iván Fundora; Cuba	Joseph Heskett; United States	Matt Gentry; Canada
2011	Jordan Burroughs; United States	Yunierki Blanco; Cuba	Matt Gentry; Canada
2011	Jordan Burroughs; United States	Yunierki Blanco; Cuba	Ricardo Roberty; Venezuela
2015	Jordan Burroughs; United States	Yoan Blanco; Ecuador	Christian Sarco; Venezuela
2015	Jordan Burroughs; United States	Yoan Blanco; Ecuador	Liván López; Cuba
2019	Jordan Burroughs; United States	Franklin Gómez; Puerto Rico	Geandry Garzón; Cuba
2019	Jordan Burroughs; United States	Franklin Gómez; Puerto Rico	Jevon Balfour; Canada

=== Freestyle (– 76 kg) ===
Games	Gold	Silver	Bronze
1999	Joe Williams; United States	Yosmany Romero; Cuba	Manuel Garcia; Puerto Rico

=== Freestyle (– 78 kg) ===
Games	Gold	Silver	Bronze
1963	Joseph Fitzgerald; United States	Julio Graffigna; Argentina	Juan Flores; Mexico
1967	Patrick Kelly; United States	Alejandro Guevara; Venezuela	Nick Schori; Canada

=== Freestyle (– 79 kg) ===
Games	Gold	Silver	Bronze
1951	León Genuth; Argentina	Louis Norton; United States	Eduardo Assam; Mexico
1955	León Genuth; Argentina	Webzel Hubel; United States	Eduardo Assam; Mexico
1959	James Ferguson; United States	Julio Graffigna; Argentina	Pedro Pacheco; Venezuela

=== Freestyle (– 82 kg) ===
Games	Gold	Silver	Bronze
1971	Lupe Lara; Cuba	Bob Anderson; United States	Taras Hryb; Canada
1975	George Hicks; United States	Richard Deschatelets; Canada	Fernando Goldschmied; Mexico
1979	Daniel Lewis; United States	Clark Davis; Canada	José Carvajal; Cuba
1983	José Damian; Cuba	Emilio Suárez; Venezuela	Christopher Rinke; Canada
1987	Mark Schultz; United States	Lou Kok; Canada	Orlando Hernández; Cuba
1991	Kevin Jackson; United States	Orlando Hernández; Cuba	David Hohl; Canada
1995	Kevin Jackson; United States	Luis Varela; Venezuela	Ariel Ramos; Cuba

=== Freestyle (– 84 kg) ===
Games	Gold	Silver	Bronze
2003	Yoel Romero; Cuba	Carl Rainville; Canada	Cael Sanderson; United States
2007	Roozbeh Banihashemi; Canada	Andy Hrovat; United States	Roylandy Zuniga; Cuba
2007	Roozbeh Banihashemi; Canada	Andy Hrovat; United States	Rodrigo Piedrahita; Colombia
2011	Jake Herbert; United States	Humberto Arencibia; Cuba	Jeffrey Adamson; Canada
2011	Jake Herbert; United States	Humberto Arencibia; Cuba	José Daniel Díaz; Venezuela

=== Freestyle (– 85 kg) ===
Games	Gold	Silver	Bronze
1999	Les Gutches; United States	Gary Holmes; Canada	Yoel Romero; Cuba

=== Freestyle (– 86 kg) ===
Games	Gold	Silver	Bronze
2015	Reineris Salas; Cuba	Jake Herbert; United States	Tamerlan Tagziev; Canada
2015	Reineris Salas; Cuba	Jake Herbert; United States	Jaime Espinal; Puerto Rico
2019	Yurieski Torreblanca; Cuba	Pedro Ceballos; Venezuela	Carlos Izquierdo; Colombia
2019	Yurieski Torreblanca; Cuba	Pedro Ceballos; Venezuela	Pat Downey; United States

=== Freestyle (– 87 kg) ===
Games	Gold	Silver	Bronze
1951	Ulises Martorella; Argentina	Antenor da Silva; Brazil	Donald McCann; United States
1955	Alfred Paulekas; United States	Óscar Salazar; Venezuela	José Hernández; Mexico
1959	Frank Rosenmayr; United States	Rod Carrow; Canada	César Ferreras; Venezuela
1963	James Ferguson; United States	Robert Steckle; Canada	Juan Miranda; Mexico
1967	Wayne Baughman; United States	Julio Graffigna; Argentina	Castor Gómez; Cuba

=== Freestyle (+ 87 kg) ===
Games	Gold	Silver	Bronze
1951	Adolfo Ramírez; Argentina	Ralph Schmidt; United States	Luis Friedman; Panama
1955	William Kerslake; United States	José Puig; Argentina	Arturo Meneses; Mexico
1959	Dale Lewis; United States	Keith Maltman; Canada	Rodolfo Padron; Venezuela

=== Freestyle (– 90 kg) ===
Games	Gold	Silver	Bronze
1971	Russ Hellickson; United States	Bárbaro Morgan; Cuba	Raúl García; Mexico
1975	Ben Peterson; United States	Bárbaro Morgan; Cuba	Terry Paice; Canada
1979	Roy Baker; United States	José Poll; Cuba	Richard Deschatelets; Canada
1983	Roberto Limonta; Cuba	Elio Francone; Argentina	Peter Bush; United States
1987	Charles Cox; Canada	Roberto Leitão; Brazil	Jim Scherr; United States
1991	Roberto Limonta; Cuba	Chris Campbell; United States	Gregory Edgelow; Canada
1995	Melvin Douglas; United States	Emilio Suárez; Venezuela	Miguel Molina; Cuba

=== Freestyle (– 96 kg) ===
Games	Gold	Silver	Bronze
2003	Daniel Cormier; United States	Antoine Jaoude; Brazil	Wilfredo Morales; Cuba
2007	Michel Batista; Cuba	Luis Vivenes; Venezuela	Daniel Cormier; United States
2007	Michel Batista; Cuba	Luis Vivenes; Venezuela	Mike Neufeld; Canada
2011	Jake Varner; United States	Luis Vivenes; Venezuela	Khetag Pliev; Canada
2011	Jake Varner; United States	Luis Vivenes; Venezuela	Juan Martínez; Colombia

=== Freestyle (– 97 kg) ===
Games	Gold	Silver	Bronze
1963	John Barden; United States	César Ferreras; Venezuela	Juan Lisa; Argentina
1967	Harry Houska; United States	Juan Caballero; Cuba	Daniel Verník; Argentina
1999	Dominic Black; United States	Wilfredo Morales; Cuba	Dean Schmeichel; Canada
2015	Kyle Snyder; United States	Arjun Gill; Canada	José Daniel Díaz; Venezuela
2015	Kyle Snyder; United States	Arjun Gill; Canada	Jesse Ruíz; Mexico
2019	Kyle Snyder; United States	José Daniel Díaz; Venezuela	Luis Miguel Pérez; Dominican Republic
2019	Kyle Snyder; United States	José Daniel Díaz; Venezuela	Reineris Salas; Cuba

=== Freestyle (+ 97 kg) ===
Games	Gold	Silver	Bronze
1963	Joe James; United States	Santiago Karam; Venezuela	Sión Cóhen; Panama
1967	Larry Kristoff; United States	Robert Chamberot; Canada	Javier Campos; Cuba

=== Freestyle (– 100 kg) ===
Games	Gold	Silver	Bronze
1971	Dominic Carollo; United States	Francisco Lonchan; Cuba	Daniel Verník; Argentina
1975	Russ Hellickson; United States	Lupe Lara; Cuba	Claude Pilon; Canada
1979	Russ Hellickson; United States	Bárbaro Morgan; Cuba	Michael Kappel; Canada
1983	Greg Gibson; United States	Richard Deschatelets; Canada	Luis Mario Miranda; Cuba
1987	Bill Scherr; United States	Luis Mario Miranda; Cuba	Gavin Carrow; Canada
1991	Mark Coleman; United States	John Matile; Canada	Ángel Anaya; Cuba
1995	Wilfredo Morales; Cuba	Mark Kerr; United States	Gavin Carrow; Canada

=== Freestyle (+ 100 kg) ===
Games	Gold	Silver	Bronze
1971	Jeff Smith; United States	Félix Fonseca; Cuba	Miguel Zambrano; Peru
1975	Michael McCready; United States	Lázaro Morales; Cuba	Carlos Braconi; Argentina
1979	Jimmy Jackson; United States	Arturo Díaz; Cuba	Wyatt Wishart; Canada
1983	Cándido Mesa; Cuba	Bruce Baumgartner; United States	Robert Molle; Canada

=== Freestyle (– 120 kg) ===
Games	Gold	Silver	Bronze
2003	Kerry McCoy; United States	Edgar Yanez; Venezuela	Alexis Valera; Cuba
2007	Alexis Rodriguez; Cuba	Tommy Rowlands; United States	Carlos Félix; Dominican Republic
2007	Alexis Rodriguez; Cuba	Tommy Rowlands; United States	Arjan Bhullar; Canada
2011	Tervel Dlagnev; United States	Sunny Dhinsa; Canada	Disney Rodríguez; Cuba
2011	Tervel Dlagnev; United States	Sunny Dhinsa; Canada	Carlos Félix; Dominican Republic

=== Freestyle (– 125 kg) ===
Games	Gold	Silver	Bronze
2015	Zach Rey; United States	Korey Jarvis; Canada	Edgardo Lopez; Puerto Rico
2015	Zach Rey; United States	Korey Jarvis; Canada	Andres Ramos; Cuba
2019	Nick Gwiazdowski; United States	Óscar Pino; Cuba	Luis Vivenes; Venezuela
2019	Nick Gwiazdowski; United States	Óscar Pino; Cuba	Korey Jarvis; Canada

=== Freestyle (– 130 kg) ===
Games	Gold	Silver	Bronze
1987	Bruce Baumgartner; United States	Domingo Mesa; Cuba	Dan Payne; Canada
1991	Bruce Baumgartner; United States	Andy Borodow; Canada	Domingo Mesa; Cuba
1995	Bruce Baumgartner; United States	Ángel Anaya; Cuba	Andy Borodow; Canada
1999	Stephen Neal; United States	Alexis Rodríguez; Cuba	Wayne Weathers; Canada

== Men's Greco-Roman ==
=== Greco-Roman (– 48 kg) ===
Games	Gold	Silver	Bronze
1975	Sirvano Valdes; Cuba	Karoly Kancsar; United States	Alfredo Olvera; Mexico
1979	Jorge Martínez; Cuba	Alfredo Olvera; Mexico	Gregg Williams; United States
1983	Reynaldo Jiménez; Cuba	Tommy Jones; United States	Gustavo Delgado; Mexico
1987	Reynaldo Jiménez; Cuba	Víctor Capacho; Colombia	Eric Wetzel; United States
1991	Mark Fuller; United States	Geovani Mato; Cuba	José Sabino; Dominican Republic
1995	Mujaahid Maynard; United States	Enrique Aguilar Zermeno; Mexico	Wilber Sánchez; Cuba

=== Greco-Roman (– 52 kg) ===
Games	Gold	Silver	Bronze
1975	Bruce Thompson; United States	Enrique Jiménez; Mexico	Raúl Trujillo; Cuba
1979	Bruce Thompson; United States	Zoilo Montano; Cuba	Jorge Muñoz; Mexico
1983	Edmundo Miranda; Cuba	Mark Fuller; United States	Daniel Aceves; Mexico
1987	Pedro Roque; Cuba	Bernardo Olvera; Mexico	Shawn Sheldon; United States
1991	Raúl Martínez; Cuba	Ramón Meña; Panama	Shawn Sheldon; United States
1995	Raúl Martínez; Cuba	Shawn Sheldon; United States	Joel Medina; Venezuela

=== Greco-Roman (– 54 kg) ===
Games	Gold	Silver	Bronze
1999	Lázaro Rivas; Cuba	David Ochoa; Venezuela	Steven Mays; United States

=== Greco-Roman (– 55 kg) ===
Games	Gold	Silver	Bronze
2003	Lázaro Rivas; Cuba	Brandon Paulson; United States	Eduardo Freites; Venezuela
2007	Yagnier Hernández; Cuba	Jorge Cardozo; Venezuela	Angel Lema; Ecuador
2007	Yagnier Hernández; Cuba	Jorge Cardozo; Venezuela	Jansel Ramírez; Dominican Republic
2011	Gustavo Balart; Cuba	Jorge Cardozo; Venezuela	Juan Carlos Lopez; Colombia
2011	Gustavo Balart; Cuba	Jorge Cardozo; Venezuela	Francisco Encarnacion; Dominican Republic

=== Greco-Roman (– 57 kg) ===
Games	Gold	Silver	Bronze
1975	Daniel Mello; United States	Leonel Pérez; Cuba	Alfredo López; Mexico
1979	Leonel Pérez; Cuba	Brian Gust; United States	Henry Loret; Puerto Rico
1983	Jesús Tejeda; Cuba	Ernesto Bahena; Mexico	Rob Herman; United States
1987	Amadoris González; Cuba	Ramón Meña; Panama	Anthony Amado; United States
1991	Amadoris González; Cuba	Víctor Capacho; Colombia	Frank Famiano; United States
1995	Dennis Hall; United States	William Lara; Cuba	Armando Fernández; Mexico

=== Greco-Roman (– 58 kg) ===
Games	Gold	Silver	Bronze
1999	Dennis Hall; United States	Roberto Monzón; Cuba	Sidney Guzman; Peru

=== Greco-Roman (– 59 kg) ===
Games	Gold	Silver	Bronze
2015	Andrés Montaño; Ecuador	Ali Soto; Mexico	Cristóbal Torres; Chile
2015	Andrés Montaño; Ecuador	Ali Soto; Mexico	Spenser Mango; United States

=== Greco-Roman (– 60 kg) ===
Games	Gold	Silver	Bronze
2003	Roberto Monzón; Cuba	Luis Liendo; Venezuela	Jim Gruenwald; United States
2007	Roberto Monzón; Cuba	Lindsey Durlacher; United States	Luis Liendo; Venezuela
2007	Roberto Monzón; Cuba	Lindsey Durlacher; United States	Mario Molina; Peru
2011	Luis Liendo; Venezuela	Joseph Betterman; United States	Hanser Meoque; Cuba
2011	Luis Liendo; Venezuela	Joseph Betterman; United States	Jansel Ramírez; Dominican Republic
2019	Andrés Montaño; Ecuador	Dicther Toro; Colombia	Luis Orta; Cuba
2019	Andrés Montaño; Ecuador	Dicther Toro; Colombia	Ildar Hafizov; United States

=== Greco-Roman (– 62 kg) ===
Games	Gold	Silver	Bronze
1975	Howard Stupp; Canada	Gary Alexander; United States	Julio Gutierrez; Mexico
1979	Doug Yeats; Canada	René Rodríguez; Cuba	John Hughes; United States
1983	René Rodríguez; Cuba	Elio Hinojosa; Venezuela	Daniel Mello; United States
1987	Mario Olvera; Cuba	Juan Mora; Mexico	Dalen Wasmund; United States
1991	Juan Marén; Cuba	Ike Anderson; United States	Winston Santos; Venezuela
1995	Juan Marén; Cuba	Winston Santos; Venezuela	David Zuniga; United States

=== Greco-Roman (– 63 kg) ===
Games	Gold	Silver	Bronze
1999	Juan Marén; Cuba	Enrique Cubas; Peru	Glenn Nieradka; United States

=== Greco-Roman (– 66 kg) ===
Games	Gold	Silver	Bronze
2003	Juan Marén; Cuba	Anyelo Mota; Dominican Republic	Luis Martinez; Colombia
2007	Justin Lester; United States	Anyelo Mota; Dominican Republic	Carlos Ramirez; Venezuela
2007	Justin Lester; United States	Anyelo Mota; Dominican Republic	Alain Milián; Cuba
2011	Pedro Mulens; Cuba	Anyelo Mota; Dominican Republic	Ulises Barragan; Mexico
2011	Pedro Mulens; Cuba	Anyelo Mota; Dominican Republic	Glenn Garrison; United States
2015	Wuileixis Rivas; Venezuela	Bryce Saddoris; United States	Miguel Martínez; Cuba
2015	Wuileixis Rivas; Venezuela	Bryce Saddoris; United States	Mario Molina; Peru

=== Greco-Roman (– 67 kg) ===
Games	Gold	Silver	Bronze
2019	Ismael Borrero; Cuba	Manuel López; Mexico	Ellis Coleman; United States
2019	Ismael Borrero; Cuba	Manuel López; Mexico	Nilton Soto; Peru

=== Greco-Roman (– 68 kg) ===
Games	Gold	Silver	Bronze
1975	Patrick Marcy; United States	Erasmo Estrada; Cuba	John McPhedran; Canada
1979	Howard Stupp; Canada	Gary Pelci; United States	Eduardo García; Cuba
1983	Antonio López; Cuba	Jim Martinez; United States	José Betancourt; Puerto Rico
1987	Alexis Jiménez; Cuba	Herminio Hidalgo; Panama	Jim Martinez; United States
1991	Andrew Seras; United States	Cecilio Rodríguez; Cuba	Juan Mora; Mexico
1995	Liubal Colás; Cuba	Andrew Seras; United States	Juan Díaz; Venezuela

=== Greco-Roman (– 69 kg) ===
Games	Gold	Silver	Bronze
1999	Liubal Colás; Cuba	David Zuniga; United States	Luis Izquierdo; Colombia

=== Greco-Roman (– 74 kg) ===
Games	Gold	Silver	Bronze
1975	Idalberto Barban; Cuba	Michael Jones; United States	Segundo Olmedo; Panama
1979	John Matthews; United States	Idalberto Barban; Cuba	Brian Renken; Canada
1983	Jeff Stuebing; Canada	James Andre; United States	Francisco Barbur; Cuba
1987	David Butler; United States	Víctor Romero; Cuba	José Betancourt; Puerto Rico
1991	Abel Sarmiento; Cuba	David Butler; United States	Nestor García; Venezuela
1995	Filiberto Azcuy; Cuba	Nestor García; Venezuela	Gordy Morgan; United States
2003	Filiberto Azcuy; Cuba	José Escobar; Colombia	T. C. Dantzler; United States
2007	Odelis Herrero; Cuba	Sixto Barrera; Peru	Felipe Macedo; Brazil
2007	Odelis Herrero; Cuba	Sixto Barrera; Peru	T. C. Dantzler; United States
2011	Jorgisbell Álvarez; Cuba	Ben Provisor; United States	Juan Escobar; Mexico
2011	Jorgisbell Álvarez; Cuba	Ben Provisor; United States	Hansel Mercedes; Dominican Republic

=== Greco-Roman (– 75 kg) ===
Games	Gold	Silver	Bronze
2015	Andy Bisek; United States	Alvis Almendra; Panama	Juan Escobar; Mexico
2015	Andy Bisek; United States	Alvis Almendra; Panama	Carlos Muñoz; Colombia

=== Greco-Roman (– 76 kg) ===
Games	Gold	Silver	Bronze
1999	Matt Lindland; United States	Filiberto Azcuy; Cuba	Rodolfo Hernández; Mexico

=== Greco-Roman (– 77 kg) ===
Games	Gold	Silver	Bronze
2019	Pat Smith; United States	Wuileixis Rivas; Venezuela	Jair Cuero; Colombia
2019	Pat Smith; United States	Wuileixis Rivas; Venezuela	Yosvanys Peña; Cuba

=== Greco-Roman (– 82 kg) ===
Games	Gold	Silver	Bronze
1975	Daniel Chandler; United States	René Vidal; Cuba	Juan Flores; Mexico
1979	Daniel Chandler; United States	Erasmo Estrada; Cuba	Louis Santerre; Canada
1983	Orlando Pérez; Cuba	Louis Santerre; Canada	Daniel Chandler; United States
1987	Christopher Catalfo; United States	Lou Kok; Canada	Juan Condé; Cuba
1991	Alfredo Linares; Cuba	Luis Rondón; Venezuela	John Morgan; United States
1995	Alexei Banes; Cuba	José Betancourt; Puerto Rico	Dan Henderson; United States

=== Greco-Roman (– 84 kg) ===
Games	Gold	Silver	Bronze
2003	Luiz Lazo; Cuba	Brad Vering; United States	Eddy Bartolozzi; Venezuela
2007	Brad Vering; United States	Eddy Bartolozzi; Venezuela	José Arias; Dominican Republic
2007	Brad Vering; United States	Eddy Bartolozzi; Venezuela	Yunior Estrada; Cuba
2011	Pablo Shorey; Cuba	Cristian Mosquera; Colombia	José Arias; Dominican Republic
2011	Pablo Shorey; Cuba	Cristian Mosquera; Colombia	Yorgen Cova; Venezuela

=== Greco-Roman (– 85 kg) ===
Games	Gold	Silver	Bronze
1999	Luis Enrique Méndez; Cuba	Quincey Clark; United States	Eddy Bartolozzi; Venezuela
2015	Jon Anderson; United States	Querys Perez; Venezuela	Alan Vera; Cuba
2015	Jon Anderson; United States	Querys Perez; Venezuela	Cristian Mosquera; Colombia

=== Greco-Roman (– 87 kg) ===
Games	Gold	Silver	Bronze
2019	Luis Avendaño; Venezuela	Alfonso Leyva; Mexico	Alvis Almendra; Panama
2019	Luis Avendaño; Venezuela	Alfonso Leyva; Mexico	Daniel Grégorich; Cuba

=== Greco-Roman (– 90 kg) ===
Games	Gold	Silver	Bronze
1975	Willie Williams; United States	Bárbaro Morgan; Cuba	Javier Serrano; Mexico
1979	José Poll; Cuba	Jerome Schmitz; United States	Steve Daniar; Canada
1983	Steve Fraser; United States	Luis Figuera; Venezuela	José Poll; Cuba
1987	Guillermo Cruz; Cuba	Derrick Waldroup; United States	Charles Cox; Canada
1991	Randy Couture; United States	Reynaldo Peña; Cuba	Gregory Edgelow; Canada
1995	Reynaldo Peña; Cuba	Michial Foy; United States	Mario Alberto González; Mexico

=== Greco-Roman (– 96 kg) ===
Games	Gold	Silver	Bronze
2003	Ernesto Peña; Cuba	Justin Ruiz; United States	Guillermo Talavera; Venezuela
2007	Justin Ruiz; United States	Luiz Fernandes; Brazil	Oscar Aguilar; Mexico
2007	Justin Ruiz; United States	Luiz Fernandes; Brazil	Erwin Caraballo; Venezuela
2011	Yunior Estrada; Cuba	Raul Anguilo; Colombia	Yuri Maier; Argentina
2011	Yunior Estrada; Cuba	Raul Anguilo; Colombia	Erwin Caraballo; Venezuela

=== Greco-Roman (– 97 kg) ===
Games	Gold	Silver	Bronze
1999	Reynaldo Peña; Cuba	Jason Klohs; United States	Colbie Bell; Canada
2019	Gabriel Rosillo; Cuba	G'Angelo Hancock; United States	Kevin Mejía; Honduras
2019	Gabriel Rosillo; Cuba	G'Angelo Hancock; United States	Luillys Pérez; Venezuela

=== Greco-Roman (– 98 kg) ===
Games	Gold	Silver	Bronze
2015	Yasmany Lugo; Cuba	Kevin Mejía; Honduras	Luillys Pérez; Venezuela
2015	Yasmany Lugo; Cuba	Kevin Mejía; Honduras	Davi Albino; Brazil

=== Greco-Roman (– 100 kg) ===
Games	Gold	Silver	Bronze
1975	Brad Rheingans; United States	Daniel Verník; Argentina	Lupe Lara; Cuba
1979	Brad Rheingans; United States	Bárbaro Morgan; Cuba	Raúl García; Mexico
1983	René Vidal; Cuba	Dennis Koslowski; United States	Guillermo Díaz; Mexico
1987	Héctor Milián; Cuba	Dennis Koslowski; United States	Steve Marshall; Canada
1991	Héctor Milián; Cuba	James Johnson; United States	John Matile; Canada
1995	Héctor Milián; Cuba	Jerry Jackson; United States	Emilio Suárez; Venezuela

=== Greco-Roman (+ 100 kg) ===
Games	Gold	Silver	Bronze
1975	William van Worth; United States	Francisco Lonchán; Cuba	Harry Geris; Canada
1979	Arturo Díaz; Cuba	William Lee; United States	Miguel Zambrano; Peru
1983	Cándido Mesa; Cuba	Jorge Añez; Venezuela	Ron Carlisle; United States

=== Greco-Roman (– 120 kg) ===
Games	Gold	Silver	Bronze
2003	Mijaín López; Cuba	Rulon Gardner; United States	Rafael Barreno; Venezuela
2007	Mijaín López; Cuba	Dremiel Byers; United States	Ari Taub; Canada
2007	Mijaín López; Cuba	Dremiel Byers; United States	Rafael Barreno; Venezuela
2011	Mijaín López; Cuba	Rafael Barreno; Venezuela	Ramón García; Dominican Republic
2011	Mijaín López; Cuba	Rafael Barreno; Venezuela	Victor Asprilla; Colombia

=== Greco-Roman (– 130 kg) ===
Games	Gold	Silver	Bronze
1987	Duane Koslowski; United States	Arturo Díaz; Cuba	Dan Payne; Canada
1991	Matt Ghaffari; United States	Wilfredo Pelayo; Cuba	Andy Borodow; Canada
1995	Matt Ghaffari; United States	Edwin Millet; Puerto Rico	Andy Borodow; Canada
1999	Héctor Milián; Cuba	Dremiel Byers; United States	Rafael Barreno; Venezuela
2015	Mijaín López; Cuba	Andrés Ayub; Chile	Josue Encarnación; Dominican Republic
2015	Mijaín López; Cuba	Andrés Ayub; Chile	Robby Smith; United States
2019	Mijaín López; Cuba	Moisés Pérez; Venezuela	Leo Santana; Dominican Republic
2019	Mijaín López; Cuba	Moisés Pérez; Venezuela	Yasmani Acosta; Chile

== Women's freestyle ==
=== Freestyle (– 48 kg) ===
Games	Gold	Silver	Bronze
2003	Patricia Miranda; United States	Lyndsay Belisle; Canada	Flor Cordova; Peru
2007	Carol Huynh; Canada	Íngrid Medrano; El Salvador	Stephanie Murata; United States
2007	Carol Huynh; Canada	Íngrid Medrano; El Salvador	Mayelis Caripá; Venezuela
2011	Carol Huynh; Canada	Clarissa Chun; United States	Patricia Bermúdez; Argentina
2011	Carol Huynh; Canada	Clarissa Chun; United States	Carolina Castillo; Colombia
2015	Geneviève Morrison; Canada	Thalía Mallqui; Peru	Alyssa Lampe; United States
2015	Geneviève Morrison; Canada	Thalía Mallqui; Peru	Carolina Castillo; Colombia

=== Freestyle (– 50 kg) ===
Games	Gold	Silver	Bronze
2019	Whitney Conder; United States	Yusneylys Guzmán; Cuba	Thalía Mallqui; Peru
2019	Whitney Conder; United States	Yusneylys Guzmán; Cuba	Carolina Castillo; Colombia

=== Freestyle (– 53 kg) ===
Games	Gold	Silver	Bronze
2015	Whitney Conder; United States	Alma Valencia; Mexico	Yamilka Del Valle; Cuba
2015	Whitney Conder; United States	Alma Valencia; Mexico	Betzabeth Argüello; Venezuela
2019	Sarah Hildebrandt; United States	Betzabeth Argüello; Venezuela	Jade Parsons; Canada
2019	Sarah Hildebrandt; United States	Betzabeth Argüello; Venezuela	Lianna Montero; Cuba

=== Freestyle (– 55 kg) ===
Games	Gold	Silver	Bronze
2003	Tina George; United States	Tonya Verbeek; Canada	Marcia Andrades; Venezuela
2007	Jackeline Rentería; Colombia	Marcie Van Dusen; United States	Tonya Verbeek; Canada
2007	Jackeline Rentería; Colombia	Marcie Van Dusen; United States	Marcia Andrades; Venezuela
2011	Helen Maroulis; United States	Tonya Verbeek; Canada	Joice Silva; Brazil
2011	Helen Maroulis; United States	Tonya Verbeek; Canada	Lissette Antes; Ecuador

=== Freestyle (– 57 kg) ===
Games	Gold	Silver	Bronze
2019	Lissette Antes; Ecuador	Jenna Burkert; United States	Giullia Penalber; Brazil
2019	Lissette Antes; Ecuador	Jenna Burkert; United States	Nes Marie Rodríguez; Puerto Rico

=== Freestyle (– 58 kg) ===
Games	Gold	Silver	Bronze
2015	Joice Silva; Brazil	Yakelin Estornell; Cuba	Lissette Antes; Ecuador
2015	Joice Silva; Brazil	Yakelin Estornell; Cuba	Yanet Sovero; Peru

=== Freestyle (– 62 kg) ===
Games	Gold	Silver	Bronze
2019	Kayla Miracle; United States	Jackeline Rentería; Colombia	Abnelis Yambo; Puerto Rico
2019	Kayla Miracle; United States	Jackeline Rentería; Colombia	Laís Nunes; Brazil

=== Freestyle (– 63 kg) ===
Games	Gold	Silver	Bronze
2003	Sara McMann; United States	Viola Yanik; Canada	Mabel Fonseca; Puerto Rico
2007	Sara McMann; United States	Yoselin Rojas; Venezuela	Megan Dolan; Canada
2007	Sara McMann; United States	Yoselin Rojas; Venezuela	Mabel Fonseca; Puerto Rico
2011	Katerina Vidiaux; Cuba	Elena Pirozhkova; United States	Luz Vázquez; Argentina
2011	Katerina Vidiaux; Cuba	Elena Pirozhkova; United States	Sandra Roa; Colombia
2015	Braxton Stone; Canada	Katerina Vidiaux; Cuba	Jackeline Rentería; Colombia
2015	Braxton Stone; Canada	Katerina Vidiaux; Cuba	Erin Clodgo; United States

=== Freestyle (– 68 kg) ===
Games	Gold	Silver	Bronze
2019	Tamyra Mensah; United States	Olivia Di Bacco; Canada	Yudaris Sánchez; Cuba
2019	Tamyra Mensah; United States	Olivia Di Bacco; Canada	Ámbar Garnica; Mexico

=== Freestyle (– 69 kg) ===
Games	Gold	Silver	Bronze
2015	Dorothy Yeats; Canada	María Acosta; Venezuela	Diana Miranda; Mexico

=== Freestyle (– 72 kg) ===
Games	Gold	Silver	Bronze
2003	Toccara Montgomery; United States	Ohenewa Akuffo; Canada	Yasmily Ramos; Venezuela
2007	Kristie Marano; United States	Ohenewa Akuffo; Canada	Rosângela Conceição; Brazil
2007	Kristie Marano; United States	Ohenewa Akuffo; Canada	Lisset Echevarria; Cuba
2011	Lisset Hechevarría; Cuba	Aline Ferreira; Brazil	Jaramit Weffer; Venezuela
2011	Lisset Hechevarría; Cuba	Aline Ferreira; Brazil	Elsa Sánchez; Dominican Republic

=== Freestyle (– 75 kg) ===
Games	Gold	Silver	Bronze
2015	Adeline Gray; United States	Justina Di Stasio; Canada	Aline Ferreira; Brazil
2015	Adeline Gray; United States	Justina Di Stasio; Canada	Lisset Hechavarría; Cuba

=== Freestyle (– 76 kg) ===
Games	Gold	Silver	Bronze
2019	Justina Di Stasio; Canada	Aline Ferreira; Brazil	Mabelkis Capote; Cuba
2019	Justina Di Stasio; Canada	Aline Ferreira; Brazil	Andrea Olaya; Colombia
