= Wrestling at the 1995 Pan American Games =

- Dates: March 11–26, 1995

This page shows the results of the Men's Wrestling Competition at the 1995 Pan American Games, held from March 11 to March 26, 1995, in Mar del Plata, Argentina.

== Freestyle ==
Event	Gold	Silver	Bronze
48 kg	Alexis Vila; Cuba	Paul Ragusa; Canada	Tim Vanni; United States
52 kg	Zeke Jones; United States	Carlos Varela González; Cuba	Tam Selwyn; Canada
57 kg	Terry Brands; United States	Robert Dawson; Canada	Alejandro Puerto Díaz; Cuba
62 kg	Tom Brands; United States	Anibal Nieves; Puerto Rico	Carlos Julian Ortíz; Cuba
68 kg	Townsend Saunders; United States	Craig Roberts; Canada	Jesús Eugenio Rodríguez; Cuba
74 kg	Alberto Rodríguez; Cuba	David Hohl; Canada	David Schultz; United States
82 kg	Kevin Jackson; United States	Luis Varela; Venezuela	Ariel Ramos; Cuba
90 kg	Melvin Douglas; United States	Emilio Suárez; Venezuela	Miguel Molina; Cuba
100 kg	Suarez Morales; Cuba	Mark Kerr; United States	Gavin Carrow; Canada
130 kg	Bruce Baumgartner; United States	Ángel Amaya; Cuba	Andy Borodow; Canada

== Greco-Roman ==
Event	Gold	Silver	Bronze
48 kg	Mujaahid Maynard; United States	Enrique Aguilar Zermeno; Mexico	Wilber Sánchez; Cuba
52 kg	Raúl Martínez Aleman; Cuba	Shawn Sheldon; United States	Joel Medina; Venezuela
57 kg	Dennis Hall; United States	William Lara; Cuba	Armando Fernández García; Mexico
62 kg	Juan Luis Marén; Cuba	Winston Santos; Venezuela	David Zuniga; United States
68 kg	Liubal Colas; Cuba	Andrew Seras; United States	Juan Díaz; Venezuela
74 kg	Filiberto Azcuy; Cuba	Nestor García; Venezuela	Gordy Morgan; United States
82 kg	Alexei Banes; Cuba	José Betancourt; Puerto Rico	Dan Henderson; United States
90 kg	Reynaldo Peña; Cuba	Michael Foy; United States	Mario Alberto González; Mexico
100 kg	Héctor Milian; Cuba	Jerry Jackson; United States	Emilio Suárez; Venezuela
130 kg	Matt Ghaffari; United States	Edwin Millet; Puerto Rico	Andrew Borodow; Canada

== Medal table ==
Place	Nation	Gold medal	Silver medal	Bronze medal	Total
1	United States	10	5	5	20
2	Cuba	10	3	6	19
3	Canada	0	4	4	7
8	Venezuela	0	4	3	7
5	Puerto Rico	0	3	0	3
6	Mexico	0	1	2	3
Total		20	20	20	60

== See also ==
- Wrestling at the 1996 Summer Olympics

== Bibliography ==
- Sports 123
