= Wrestling at the 1980 Summer Olympics – Men's freestyle +100 kg =

Men's freestyle +100 kg at the Games of the XXII Olympiad
- Venue: Central Sports Club of the Army
- Dates: 29–31 July 1980
- Competitors: 12 from 12 nations

Medalists
1st place, gold medalist(s)		Soslan Andiyev	Soviet Union
2nd place, silver medalist(s)		József Balla	Hungary
3rd place, bronze medalist(s)		Adam Sandurski	Poland

The Men's Freestyle +100 kg at the 1980 Summer Olympics as part of the wrestling program were held at the Athletics Fieldhouse, Central Sports Club of the Army.

== Medalists ==
Gold	Soslan Andiyev; Soviet Union
Silver	József Balla; Hungary
Bronze	Adam Sandurski; Poland

== Tournament results ==
The competition used a form of negative points tournament, with negative points given for any result short of a fall. Accumulation of 6 negative points eliminated the loser wrestler. When only three wrestlers remain, a special final round is used to determine the order of the medals.

Legend

- TF — Won by Fall
- IN — Won by Opponent Injury
- DQ — Won by Passivity
- D1 — Won by Passivity, the winner is passive too
- D2 — Both wrestlers lost by Passivity
- FF — Won by Forfeit
- DNA — Did not appear
- TPP — Total penalty points
- MPP — Match penalty points

Penalties

- 0 — Won by Fall, Technical Superiority, Passivity, Injury and Forfeit
- 0.5 — Won by Points, 8-11 points difference
- 1 — Won by Points, 1-7 points difference
- 2 — Won by Passivity, the winner is passive too
- 3 — Lost by Points, 1-7 points difference
- 3.5 — Lost by Points, 8-11 points difference
- 4 — Lost by Fall, Technical Superiority, Passivity, Injury and Forfeit

=== Round 1 ===
TPP	MPP		Score		MPP	TPP
1	1	Miguel Zambrano (PER)	11 - 5	Matthew Clempner (GBR)	3	3
4	4	Arturo Díaz (CUB)	TF / 1:15	Adam Sandurski (POL)	0	0
0.5	0.5	Mamadou Sakho (SEN)	10 - 1	Odnoin Bakhyt (MGL)	3.5	3.5
3	3	Roland Gehrke (GDR)	5 - 7	Soslan Andiyev (URS)	1	1
4	4	Petar Ivanov (BUL)	DQ / 8:37	József Balla (HUN)	0	0
4	4	Youssef Diba (SYR)	DQ / 6:29	Andrei Ianko (ROU)	0	0

=== Round 2 ===
TPP	MPP		Score		MPP	TPP
5	4	Miguel Zambrano (PER)	DQ / 5:46	Arturo Díaz (CUB)	0	4
7	4	Mathew Clempner (GBR)	TF / 1:28	Adam Sandurski (POL)	0	0
4.5	4	Mamadou Sakho (SEN)	TF / 1:05	Roland Gehrke (GDR)	0	3
7.5	4	Odnoin Bakhyt (MGL)	TF / 0:37	Soslan Andiyev (URS)	0	1
4	0	Petar Ivanov (BUL)	TF / 0:58	Youssef Dibo (SYR)	4	8
0	0	József Balla (HUN)	DQ / 6:52	Andrei Ianko (ROU)	4	4

=== Round 3 ===
TPP	MPP		Score		MPP	TPP
9	4	Miguel Zambrano (PER)	TF / 2:06	Adam Sandurski (POL)	0	0
8	4	Arturo Díaz (CUB)	IN / 2:43	Mamadou Sakho (SEN)	0	4.5
4	1	Roland Gehrke (GDR)	5 - 3	Petar Ivanov (BUL)	3	7
1	0	Soslan Andiyev (URS)	DQ / 4:55	József Balla (HUN)	4	4
4		Andrei Ianko (ROU)		Bye		

=== Round 4 ===
TPP	MPP		Score		MPP	TPP
8	4	Andrei Ianko (ROU)	TF / 5:01	Adam Sandurski (POL)	0	0
8.5	4	Mamadou Sakho (SEN)	TF / 0:40	Soslan Andiyev (URS)	0	1
7	3	Roland Gehrke (GDR)	4 - 6	József Balla (HUN)	1	5

=== Final ===
Results from the preliminary round are carried forward into the final (shown in yellow).

TPP	MPP		Score		MPP	TPP
	0	Soslan Andiyev (URS)	DQ / 4:55	József Balla (HUN)	4	
	3	Adam Sandurski (POL)	3 - 6	Soslan Andiyev (URS)	1	1
5	1	József Balla (HUN)	4 - 4	Adam Sandurski (POL)	3	6

== Final standings ==
1. Soslan Andiyev (URS)
2. József Balla (HUN)
3. Adam Sandurski (POL)
4. Roland Gehrke (GDR)
5. Andrei Ianko (ROU)
6. Mamadou Sakho (SEN)
7. Petar Ivanov (BUL)
8. Arturo Díaz (CUB)
