= Wrestling at the 1991 Pan American Games =

- Dates: August 2–18, 1991

This page shows the results of the Men's Wrestling Competition at the 1991 Pan American Games, held from August 2 to August 18, 1991, in Havana, Cuba. The Greco-Roman category was notable as it featured a gold medal performance by Randy Couture, who would later become a multi-time world champion in the UFC. The event also featured a gold medal performance by Mark Coleman, who would later become the first UFC Heavyweight champion.

== Men's freestyle ==
=== Freestyle (– 48 kg) ===
RANK	NAME
Gold medal	Aldo Martínez Echevarria (CUB)
Silver medal	José Sabino (DOM)
Bronze medal	Tim Vanni (USA)

=== Freestyle (– 52 kg) ===
RANK	NAME
Gold medal	Carlos Varela González (CUB)
Silver medal	Bernardo Olvera (MEX)
Bronze medal	Zeke Jones (USA)

=== Freestyle (– 57 kg) ===
RANK	NAME
Gold medal	Brad Penrith (USA)
Silver medal	Alejandro Puerto Díaz (CUB)
Bronze medal	Robert Dawson (CAN)

=== Freestyle (– 62 kg) ===
RANK	NAME
Gold medal	John Smith (USA)
Silver medal	Anibál Nieves Javier (PUR)
Bronze medal	Lázaro Reinoso (CUB)

=== Freestyle (– 68 kg) ===
RANK	NAME
Gold medal	Townsend Saunders (USA)
Silver medal	Daniel Navarrete (ARG)
Bronze medal	José Díaz (VEN)

=== Freestyle (– 74 kg) ===
RANK	NAME
Gold medal	Kenny Monday (USA)
Silver medal	Felipe Guzmán (MEX)
Bronze medal	Alberto Rodríguez (CUB)

=== Freestyle (– 82 kg) ===
RANK	NAME
Gold medal	Kevin Jackson (USA)
Silver medal	Orlando Hernández (CUB)
Bronze medal	David Hohl (CAN)

=== Freestyle (– 90 kg) ===
RANK	NAME
Gold medal	Roberto Limonta Vargas (CUB)
Silver medal	Chris Campbell (USA)
Bronze medal	Gregory Edgelow (CAN)

=== Freestyle (– 100 kg) ===
RANK	NAME
Gold medal	Mark Coleman (USA)
Silver medal	John Matile (CAN)
Bronze medal	Ángel Anaya (CUB)

=== Freestyle (– 130 kg) ===
RANK	NAME
Gold medal	Bruce Baumgartner (USA)
Silver medal	Andy Borodow (CAN)
Bronze medal	Domingo Mesa (CUB)

== Men's Greco-Roman ==
=== Greco-Roman (– 48 kg) ===
RANK	NAME
Gold medal	Mark Albert Fuller (USA)
Silver medal	Geovani Mato (CUB)
Bronze medal	José Sabino (DOM)

=== Greco-Roman (– 52 kg) ===
RANK	NAME
Gold medal	Raúl Francisco Martínez (CUB)
Silver medal	Ramón Mena (PAN)
Bronze medal	Shawn Sheldon (USA)

=== Greco-Roman (– 57 kg) ===
RANK	NAME
Gold medal	Amadoris González (CUB)
Silver medal	Víctor Capacho (COL)
Bronze medal	Frank Famiano (USA)

=== Greco-Roman (– 62 kg) ===
RANK	NAME
Gold medal	Juan Luis Marén (CUB)
Silver medal	Isaac Anderson (USA)
Bronze medal	Winston Santos (VEN)

=== Greco-Roman (– 68 kg) ===
RANK	NAME
Gold medal	Andrew Seras (USA)
Silver medal	Cecilio Rodríguez (CUB)
Bronze medal	Juan Mora (MEX)

=== Greco-Roman (– 74 kg) ===
RANK	NAME
Gold medal	Abel Sarmiento (CUB)
Silver medal	David Butler (USA)
Bronze medal	Néstor García (VEN)

=== Greco-Roman (– 82 kg) ===
RANK	NAME
Gold medal	Alfredo Linares (CUB)
Silver medal	Luis Rondón (VEN)
Bronze medal	John Morgan (USA)

=== Greco-Roman (– 90 kg) ===
RANK	NAME
Gold medal	Randy Couture (USA)
Silver medal	Reynaldo Peña (CUB)
Bronze medal	Gregory Edgelow (CAN)

=== Greco-Roman (– 100 kg) ===
RANK	NAME
Gold medal	Héctor Milian (CUB)
Silver medal	James Johnson (USA)
Bronze medal	John Matile (CAN)

=== Greco-Roman (– 130 kg) ===
RANK	NAME
Gold medal	Matt Ghaffari (USA)
Silver medal	Wilfredo Pelayo (CUB)
Bronze medal	Andy Borodow (CAN)

== Medal table ==
Place	Nation	Gold medal	Silver medal	Bronze medal	Total
1	United States	11	4	5	20
2	Cuba	9	6	4	19
3	Canada	0	2	6	8
4	Mexico	0	2	1	3
5	Venezuela	0	1	3	4
6	Dominican Republic	0	1	1	2
7	Colombia	0	1	0	1
7	Panama	0	1	0	1
7	Argentina	0	1	0	1
7	Puerto Rico	0	1	0	1
Total		20	20	20	60

== See also ==
- Wrestling at the 1992 Summer Olympics
