= Waynesburg Yellow Jackets wrestling =

Wrestling team of Waynesburg University

- Founded: 1928; 98 years ago
- University: Waynesburg University
- Head coach: Bobby Patnesky (1st season)
- Assistant coach: Nick Garber (1st year)
- Conference: Presidents' Athletic Conference
- Location: Waynesburg, PA
- Arena: Rudy Marisa Fieldhouse (capacity: 1,350)
- Nickname: Yellow Jackets
- Colors: Orange and black

NCAA individual champions
- 3

All-Americans
- 17

Conference championships
- 7

The Waynesburg Yellow Jackets wrestling program is the collegiate wrestling team at Waynesburg University. The team is a member of the Presidents' Athletic Conference and competes in the NCAA Division III level. The Yellow Jackets compete at Rudy Marisa Fieldhouse, a 1,350 capacity indoor stadium on the university's campus.

== History ==
=== Early History (1928 - 1963) ===
The program began in 1928 under head coach J.M. Miller, who led the team until 1942. After a brief hiatus during World War II, Waynesburg rose to national prominence under coach Raymond 'Buck' Murdock, who led the program from 1947 to 1963 and was inducted into the NAIA Wrestling Hall of Fame in 1968. Murdock amassed an impressive 122-21-2 record with an 84.4% winning percentage, coaching six undefeated teams and leading the Yellow Jackets to a remarkable 34 consecutive dual-match wins from 1949 to 1952.

=== Clayton P. Ketterling Era (1963 - 1980) ===
By the late 1960s, Waynesburg had become a fixture at the NAIA Tournament in Omaha, Nebraska, securing four straight Top 10 finishes under coach Clayton P. Ketterling. Ketterling himself was elevated to the position of Athletic Director of Waynesburg College in 1966 and named to the United States Olympic Wrestling Committee in 1972.

During this golden era, two standout wrestlers, Ralph Schneider (26-0-0 from 1951-57) and Tony Gizoni (28-0-0 from 1948-52), went undefeated in dual matches, with Gizoni winning the NCAA national title at 123 pounds in 1951 and being named "Outstanding Wrestler" by the Helms Foundation Amateur Hall of Fame. George Lewis also claimed first place at the 1948 NCAA wrestling championships at 125.5 pounds, while Tony Gusic (137 pounds) and Mike Zrimm (167 pounds) won individual NAIA titles at the 1965 NCAA University Division wrestling championships.

=== Sam Church Era (1980 - 1993) ===
Under Sam Church’s leadership from 1980 to 1993, Waynesburg achieved 11 Top 25 finishes in the NAIA and produced 22 All-Americans. Among the grapplers of the early 1980s was 1984 Team MVP Steven Burchianti, who capped a 1984 campaign with an impressive 20-3 record. The late 1980s saw the rise of the Jenkins brothers, with Jim Jenkins setting a new school record of 76-27-2 before his brother Mark became the first Waynesburg wrestler to surpass 100 career wins. Mark Jenkins was a four-time All-American with a career record of 108-19-2, earning three fifth-place finishes and one sixth at nationals, competing at both 142 and 134 pounds. In 2001, Shawn Whyte came within one win of breaking Mark Jenkins' record, finishing his career at 107-19, but it was Ken Laird who ultimately set the new standard with 109 career victories, including two individual conference titles at 149 pounds.

=== Closser, Thomas, & Heard (1993 - 2008) ===
From 1993 to the mid-2000s, Waynesburg University’s wrestling program was led by several coaches who each contributed to its development. Ernie Closser served as head coach beginning in 1993 and remained in the role for over a decade, during which time the team secured multiple Presidents’ Athletic Conference championships and produced several All-Americans. Following Closser’s tenure, Dave Thomas took over as head coach for the 2005–06 season. In April 2006, Charlie Heard was appointed head coach. Charlie Heard served as Waynesburg University’s head wrestling coach from April 2006 to early 2008, compiling a dual-meet record of just 1–22 over two seasons (1–11 in 2007, 0–11 in 2008). The program faced significant struggles during his tenure, including the absence of any home matches in his final year.

=== Ron Headlee Era (2008 - 2021) ===
Since taking over as head coach in 2008, Ron Headlee has overseen a significant period of growth and success for the Waynesburg University wrestling program. After inheriting a team that went 0-11 the previous season, he led the Yellow Jackets to a 10-4 record in his first year, including a sweep of conference opponents. Over his tenure, the team has posted a 127-87-1 overall record and a 22-4 mark in Presidents’ Athletic Conference (PAC) dual meets, along with earning seven PAC team titles. Headlee has coached 10 NCAA All-Americans, including the program’s first Division III national champion, Jake Evans, in 2018, who graduated with 185 career wins, the most in NCAA history across all divisions. Other notable wrestlers include Anthony Bonaventura, who placed second nationally in 2014, and Luke Lohr, a two-time All-American and four-time PAC champion.

Under Headlee’s leadership, Waynesburg has produced 43 individual PAC champions, 10 regional champions, and five PAC Outstanding Wrestler award recipients. Headlee has been recognized multiple times with PAC Coach of the Year honors, was named the 2017 NCAA Division III Mideast Regional Coach of the Year, and in 2016 was inducted into the Southwestern Pennsylvania Wrestling Hall of Fame.

=== Modern Era (2021- Present) ===
After Ron Headlee retired following the 2021–2022 season, Aaron McKinney took over as head coach of the Waynesburg University wrestling program. He led the team until his resignation in early 2025, when he was succeeded in April by Bobby Patnesky, a former Division I head coach.

== Head coaches ==
Waynesburg University has had 10 head coaches.

Tenure	Coach	Record	Win %
1928	J.M. Miller	0-0-0	–
1928–1963	Raymond Murdock	122-21-2	.848
1963–1980	Clayton P. Ketterling	154–62–0	.713
1980–1993	Sam Church	41–38–2	.519
1993–2005	Ernie Closser	13–60–1	.182
2005-2006	Dave Thomas	1–14	.067
2006–2008	Charles Heard	1–23	.042
2008–2021	Ron Headlee	128–87–1	.595
2021–2025	Aaron McKinney	7–58	.108
2025–Present	Bobby Patnesky	0–0–0	–

== Women's Wrestling ==
In 2024, Waynesburg University launched its first women’s wrestling program, becoming the first college in Southwestern Pennsylvania to do so. Karli Thomas, a 2017 Albert Gallatin graduate, was named head coach and led the team in its inaugural 2024–25 season. Thomas, who developed her coaching experience at The Mat Factory in Lower Burrell, was praised by Waynesburg officials for her leadership and impact on young athletes. The team competed under freestyle rules, joining several other programs nationwide as women’s collegiate wrestling continued to grow ahead of the NCAA’s anticipated championship debut in 2026.
