= José Betancourt =

Puerto Rican wrestler

Personal information
- Nationality: Puerto Rican
- Born: 8 January 1963 (age 63) Humacao, Puerto Rico

Sport
- Sport: Wrestling
Medal record
Representing Puerto Rico
Pan American Games
Silver medal – second place	1995 Mar del Plata	Greco-Roman -82kg
Bronze medal – third place	1983 Caracas	Greco-Roman -68kg
Bronze medal – third place	1987 Indianapolis	Greco-Roman -74kg
Central American and Caribbean Games
Silver medal – second place	1982 Havana	Freestyle -68kg
Silver medal – second place	1986 Santiago	Greco-Roman -74kg
Silver medal – second place	1990 Mexico City	Freestyle -82kg
Silver medal – second place	1993 Ponce	Freestyle -82kg
Silver medal – second place	2002 San Salvador	Freestyle -84kg
Bronze medal – third place	1986 Santiago	Freestyle -74kg
Bronze medal – third place	1990 Mexico City	Greco-Roman -82kg
Bronze medal – third place	1993 Ponce	Greco-Roman -82kg

José Betancourt Rosario (born 8 January 1963) is a Puerto Rican former wrestler who competed in the 1984 Summer Olympics, in the 1992 Summer Olympics, and in the 1996 Summer Olympics. He won a bronze medal at the 1987 Pan-American Games in the 74.0 kg Greco-Roman category. At the 1987 Pan-American Games 74.0 kg freestyle category he finished fourth. At the 1991 Pan-American Games: 82.0 kg Greco-Roman category he finished fifth.
