= Petar Ivanov (wrestler) =

Bulgarian wrestler

Personal information
- Nationality: Bulgarian
- Born: 25 August 1958 (age 67) Burgas, Bulgaria

Sport
- Sport: Wrestling

Petar Ivanov (born 25 August 1958) is a Bulgarian wrestler. He competed in the men's freestyle +100 kg at the 1980 Summer Olympics.
