= Wrestling at the 1994 Commonwealth Games =

- Venue: Juan de Fuca Recreation Centre
- Location: Victoria, Canada
- Dates: 18 to 28 August 1994

Wrestling at the 1994 Commonwealth Games was the 14th appearance of Wrestling at the Commonwealth Games. The events were held in Victoria, Canada, from 18 to 28 August 1994. The competition featured contests in ten weight classes.

The events took place in the Juan de Fuca Arena on the Juan de Fuca Recreation Centre, off 1767 Island Highway in the west of Victoria.

Canada topped the wrestling medal table for the fifth successive Games by virtue of winning nine of the ten gold medals on offer.

== Medal table ==
* Host nation (Canada)

Medals won by nation with totals, ranked by number of golds—sortable
Rank	Nation	Gold	Silver	Bronze	Total
1	Canada*	9	1	0	10
2	Nigeria	1	3	0	4
3	England	0	3	1	4
4	India	0	2	3	5
5	Australia	0	1	1	2
6	Pakistan	0	0	2	2
6	Scotland	0	0	2	2
8	Cyprus	0	0	1	1
Totals (8 entries)		10	10	10	30

== Medallists ==
Event	Gold	Silver	Bronze
Light flyweight 48kg	Jacob Isaac; Nigeria	Paul Ragusa; Canada	Ramesh Kumar; India
Flyweight 52kg	Selwyn Tam; Canada	Andrew Hutchinson; England	Kripa Shankar Patel; India
Bantamweight 57kg	Robert Dawson; Canada	Ashok Kumar Garg; India	Cory O'Brien; Australia
Featherweight 62kg	Marty Calder; Canada	John Melling; England	Aroutioun Barseguian; Cyprus
Lightweight 68kg	Chris Wilson; Canada	Ibo Oziti; Nigeria	Muhammad Umar; Pakistan
Welterweight 74kg	David Hohl; Canada	Rein Ozoline; Australia	Calum McNeil; Scotland
Middleweight 82kg	Justin Abdou; Canada	Randhir Singh; India	Muhammad Bhola; Pakistan
Light heavyweight 90kg	Scott Bianco; Canada	Victor Kodei; Nigeria	Graeme English; Scotland
Heavyweight 100kg	Greg Edgelow; Canada	Noel Loban; England	Subhash Verma; India
Super heavyweight +100kg	Andy Borodow; Canada	Bidei Jackson; Nigeria	Amarjit Singh; England

== Results ==
=== Light flyweight 48kg ===
Medal round	Winner	Loser	Score
Bronze	Ramesh Kumar (IND)	Hermanus Louw (NAM)	10–0
Gold	Jacob Isaac (NGR)	Paul Ragusa (CAN)	inj 3–0

Final positions:

- 1. Jacob Isaac (NGR)
- 2. Paul Ragusa (CAN)
- 3. Ramesh Kumar (IND)
- 4. Hermanus Louw (NAM)
- 5. Gregory Fitzgerald (AUS)

=== Flyweight 52kg ===
Medal round	Winner	Loser	Score
Bronze medal	Kripa Shankar Patel (IND)	David Connelly (SCO)	3–0
Gold medal	Selwyn Tam (CAN)	Andrew Hutchinson (ENG)	10–0

Final positions:

- 1. Selwyn Tam (CAN)
- 2. Andrew Hutchinson (ENG)
- 3. Kripa Shankar Patel (IND)
- 4. David Connelly (SCO)
- 5. Shane Stannett (NZL)
- 6 Hendrik Engelbrecht (RSA)
- 7 Joe Oziti (NGR)
- 8 Razi Gul (PAK)
- - Simon Lamach (KEN)
- - George Karipidis (AUS)

=== Bantamweight 57kg ===
Medal round	Winner	Loser	Score
Bronze medal	Cory O'Brien (AUS)	Paul Nedley (SCO)	12–2
Gold medal	Robert Dawson (CAN)	Ashok Kumar Garg (IND)	7–1

Final positions:

- 1. Robert Dawson (CAN)
- 2. Ashok Kumar Garg (IND)
- 3. Cory O'Brien (AUS)
- 4. Paul Nedley (SCO)
- 5. Vickus Swanepoel (NAM)

=== Featherweight 62kg ===
Medal round	Winner	Loser	Score
Bronze medal	Aroutioun Barseguian (CYP)	Terry van Rensburg (RSA)	3–0
Gold medal	Marty Calder (CAN)	John Melling (ENG)	3–1

Final positions:

- 1. Marty Calder (CAN)
- 2. John Melling (ENG)
- 3. Aroutioun Barseguian (CYP)
- 4. Terry van Rensburg (RSA)
- 5. Dharambir Singh (IND)
- 6. Stephen Bell (NZL)
- 7. Musa Ilhan (AUS)
- 8. James Breen (SCO)
- - Jacobus de Jager (NAM)
- - Igali Baraladei (NGR)
- - John O'Rawe (NIR)

=== Lightweight 68kg ===
Medal round	Winner	Loser	Score
Bronze medal	Muhammad Umar (PAK)	Sucha Singh (IND)	3–1
Gold medal	Chris Wilson (CAN)	Ibo Oziti (NGR)	5–0

Final positions:

- 1. Chris Wilson (CAN)
- 2. Ibo Oziti (NGR)
- 3. Muhammad Umar (PAK)
- 4. Sucha Singh (IND)
- 5. Wiehahn Lesch (RSA)
- 6. Christopher Quinlan (NZL)
- 7. Brian Aspen (ENG)
- 8. Raymond Sharp (AUS)
- 9. Mark Bowman (NIR)
- 10. Gregor McNeil (SCO)
- =11. Paul Salbei (KEN)
- =11. Phillip Bean (NAM)

=== Welterweight 74kg ===
Medal round	Winner	Loser	Score
Bronze medal	Calum McNeil (SCO)	Bennie Labuschagne (RSA)	4–2
Gold medal	David Hohl (CAN)	Rein Ozoline (AUS)	9–2

Final positions:

- 1. David Hohl (CAN)
- 2. Rein Ozoline (AUS)
- 3. Calum McNeil (SCO)
- 4. Bennie Labuschagne (RSA)
- 5. Tejbir Singh (IND)
- 6. Muhammad Fayyaz (PAK)
- 7. Shane Rigby (ENG)
- 8. Sigfried Kostens (NAM)

=== Middleweight 82kg ===
Medal round	Winner	Loser	Score
Bronze medal	Muhammad Bhola (PAK)	Enekpedekumoh Okporu (NGR)	3–0
Gold medal	Justin Abdou (CAN)	Randhir Singh (IND)	15–3

Final positions:

- 1. Justin Abdou (CAN)
- 2. Randhir Singh (IND)
- 3. Muhammad Bhola (PAK)
- 4. Enekpedekumoh Okporu (NGR)
- 5. Willem Putter (RSA)
- 6. Shaun Morley (ENG)
- 7. John Andrew (NZL)
- 8. Thomas Watson (SCO)
- 9. Linus Masheti (KEN)

=== Light heavyweight 90kg ===
Medal round	Winner	Loser	Score
Bronze medal	Graeme English (SCO)	Joe Mossford (ENG)	7–0
Gold medal	Scott Bianco (CAN)	Victor Kodei (NGR)	4–3

Final positions:

- 1. Scott Bianco (CAN)
- 2. Victor Kodei (NGR)
- 3. Graeme English (SCO)
- 4. Joe Mossford (ENG)
- 5. Bob Renney (AUS)
- 6. Sanjay Kumar (IND)
- 7. Richard Tanui (KEN)

=== Heavyweight 100kg ===
Medal round	Winner	Loser	Score
Bronze medal	Subhash Verma (IND)	Iloanusi Christian (NGR)	3–0
Gold medal	Greg Edgelow (CAN)	Noel Loban (ENG)	7–1

Final positions:

- 1. Greg Edgelow (CAN)
- 2. Noel Loban (ENG)
- 3. Subhash Verma (IND)
- 4. Iloanusi Christian (NGR)
- 5. Shahid Pervaiz (PAK)

=== Super heavyweight +100kg ===
Medal round	Winner	Loser	Score
Bronze medal	Amarjit Singh (ENG)	Jagdish Singh (IND)	5–0
Gold medal	Andy Borodow (CAN)	Bidei Jackson (NGR)	5–3

Final positions:

- 1. Andy Borodow (CAN)
- 2. Bidei Jackson (NGR)
- 3. Amarjit Singh (ENG)
- 4. Jagdish Singh (IND)
- 5. Andrew William Renney (AUS)
- 6. Douglas Thomson (SCO)
- 7. Shahid Butt (PAK)

== See also ==
- List of Commonwealth Games medallists in wrestling
