= Nestor García (wrestler) =

Venezuelan wrestler (born 1966)

Personal information
- Nationality: Venezuelan
- Born: 3 December 1966 (age 59) Delta Amacuro, Venezuela

Sport
- Sport: Wrestling
Medal record
Representing Venezuela
Pan American Games
Silver medal – second place	1995 Mar del Plata	Welterweight
Bronze medal – third place	1991 Havana	Welterweight

Nestor García (born 3 December 1966) is a Venezuelan wrestler. He competed in the men's Greco-Roman 74 kg at the 1996 Summer Olympics.
