= Gregory Edgelow =

Canadian wrestler

Medal record

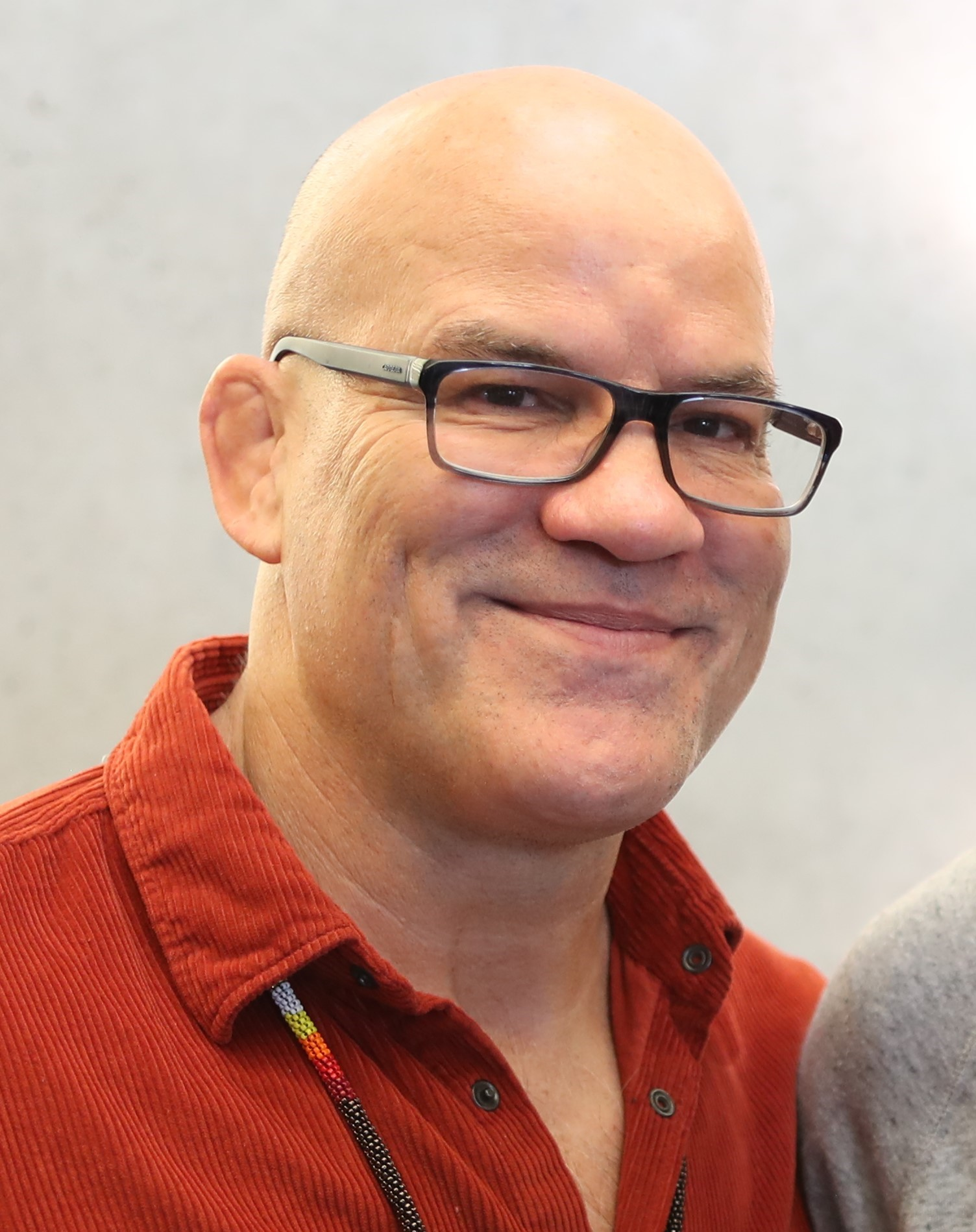

1992 Olympic Freestyle Wrestling Team

Representing Canada

Commonwealth Games
Gold medal – first place	1994 Victoria	Freestyle (100 kg)

Pan American Games
Bronze medal – third place	1991 Havana	Freestyle (90 kg)
Bronze medal – third place	1991 Havana	Greco-Roman (90 kg)

Goodwill Games
Bronze medal – third place	1990 Seattle	Freestyle (90 kg)

Greg Edgelow (born February 10) is a retired freestyle wrestler from Canada and is a nationally certified Wrestling Coach and Indigenous Coach with Red River Metis Nation Citizenship and European mix (Irish, Norwegian). In 2018, Greg was inducted into the BC Sports Hall of Fame, Indigenous Gallery and in 2024, inducted into the North American Indigenous Athletics Hall of Fame. He represented Canada at the 1992 Summer Olympics in Barcelona, Spain and won a bronze medal at the 1990 Goodwill Games in Seattle, two bronze medals at the 1991 Pan American Games in Havana, Cuba, 2 silver medals at the 1990 and 1992 Pan American Championships and a gold medal at the 1994 Commonwealth Games in Victoria. Greg also added two more silver medals at the 1991 and 1992 Pan American Championships. He is an eight-time Canadian senior champion (7 Freestyle and 1 Greco). Edgelow is the only Canadian to win a medal in wrestling (bronze) at the Goodwill Games ever. He is also the only Canadian wrestler to win four separate consecutive senior weight classes in Freestyle (82 kg, 90 kg, 96 kg, 100 kg). His last national title was in 1998, the same year that he represented Canada (100 Kg) at the World Championships in Tehran, Iran.

Edgelow was awarded the 1999 Canadian Sport Leadership Award for his athletic achievements and leadership in volunteerism, beating out fellow finalists Wayne Gretzky and downhill skier Brian Stemmle. As well, Greg was bestowed with Simon Fraser University's "Outstanding Alumni Award" in 1996.

Born in Edmonton, Alberta, Edgelow grew up in Coquitlam, Penticton, Vernon, until he completed high school, and then Burnaby where he completed his undergraduate degree on a 4 year scholarship and now resides in Vancouver. Greg has been involved in the Canadian sport, tourism, entertainment and First Nations communities where he has also participated on 8 volunteer boards of directors and councils, including 60 committees. In business, Edgelow has managed non-profits and has aligned himself with some well recognized national and international branded companies. His volunteer experiences allowed him to develop and participate on nine adjudication committees in which he has chaired five and helped adjudicate small grants totalling almost five million dollars for sport infrastructure development to needy communities across the country and one million dollars in grants to top-performing, volunteer-driven, world-caliber athletes representing Canada. Edgelow was the motivational speaker at the Parade of Nations for the 1997 North American Indigenous Games (NAIG)-Victoria and member of Team BC Mission Staff at NAIG 2006-Denver and Assistant Chef de Mission at NAIG 2008-Cowichan. Greg worked with the Boys under 16 Soccer team at the 2017 NAIG-Toronto where they earned GOLD. Edgelow helps out on occasion with the wrestling clubs around Greater Vancouver as well as coaching First Nation youth around the province. Greg and his father created an endowed scholarship fund at Simon Fraser University in 1996 that has financially assisted over 30 university wrestlers since its creation. A few of the Boards Greg has served on include: BC Wrestling, SFU Alumni, Sport BC, Canadian Sport Tourism Alliance, Athletes CAN, Commonwealth Games Canada & Blanket BC. Greg has travelled to 105 countries, 71 world capitals and 28 Olympic Host cities through sport, business and leisure travelling.

1991 Pan American Games (Greco 90 kg)----------------------------------------------------------------------------------------------------------1991 Pan American Games (Freestyle 90 kg)

RANK	GRECO-ROMAN (90 kg)
Gold medal	Randy Couture (USA)
Silver medal	Reynaldo Peña (CUB)
Bronze medal	Gregory Edgelow (CAN)

RANK	FREESTYLE (90 kg)
Gold medal	Randy Limonta (CUB)
Silver medal	Chris Campbell (USA)
Bronze medal	Gregory Edgelow (CAN)

== 1994 Commonwealth Games (100 Kg) - 1999 Canadian Sport Leadership Award ==
RANK	NAME
Gold medal	Gregory Edgelow (CAN)
Silver medal	Noel Loban (ENG)
Bronze medal	Subash Varma (IND)

POSITION	NAME	CITY	SPORT
Winner	Greg Edgelow	Vancouver, BC	Wrestling/Athletes CAN
Finalist	Wayne Gretzky	Brantford, ON	Ice Hockey
Finalist	Brian Stemmle	Toronto, ON	Alpine Skiing

=== Achievements ===
==== Canadian National Wrestling Championships ====
Year	Category	Medal
1981	70 kg - Wrestling - Juv. Freestyle	Bronze medal
1982	74 kg - Wrestling - Juv. Freestyle	Gold medal
1983	74 kg - Wrestling – Jr. Freestyle	Gold medal
1984	82 kg - Wrestling – Jr. Freestyle	Bronze medal
1987	82 kg - Wrestling – Sr. Freestyle	Gold medal
1988	90 kg - Wrestling – Sr. Freestyle	Bronze medal
1989	90 kg - Wrestling – Sr. Freestyle	Gold medal
1990	90 kg - Wrestling – Sr. Freestyle	Gold medal
1991	90 kg - Wrestling – Sr. Freestyle	Gold medal
1992	100 kg - Wrestling – Sr. Freestyle	Gold medal
1993	100 kg - Wrestling – Sr. Greco	Gold medal
1993	100 kg - Wrestling – Sr. Freestyle	Silver medal
1994	100 kg - Wrestling – Sr. Freestyle	Silver medal
1998	96 kg - Wrestling – Sr. Freestyle	Gold medal

==== World Wrestling Championships ====
Year	Category	Location	Rank
1982	74 kg - Wrestling – Juv. Freestyle	Colorado Springs, CO	4th
1983	74 kg - Wrestling – Jr. Freestyle	Los Angeles, CA	6th
1987	82 kg - Wrestling – Sr. Freestyle	Clermont-Ferrand, FR	9th
1989	90 kg - Wrestling – Sr. Freestyle	Martigny, SU	6th
1990	90 kg - Wrestling – Sr. Freestyle	Tokyo, JP	8th

==== Major Canadian & International Games ====
Year	Category	Location	Medal/Rank
1981	74 kg – Wrestling – Juv. Freestyle	BC Winter Games - Prince George	Gold medal
1981	74 kg - Wrestling – Juv. Greco	BC Winter Games - Prince George	Gold medal
1983	82 kg - Wrestling – Jr. Freestyle	Canada Winter Games - Lac St. Jean	Silver medal
1990	90 kg - Wrestling – Sr. Freestyle	Goodwill Games - Seattle	Bronze medal
1991	90 kg - Wrestling – Sr. Freestyle	Pan American Games - Havana	Bronze medal
1991	90 kg - Wrestling – Sr. Greco	Pan American Games - Havana	Bronze medal
1992	90 kg - Wrestling – Sr. Freestyle	Olympic Games - Barcelona	11th Place
1994	100 kg - Wrestling – Sr. Freestyle	Commonwealth Games - Victoria	Gold medal

==== International ====
Year	Category	Event - Location	Medal/Rank
1982	74 kg - Wrestling – Jr. Freestyle	Jolliet International - Chicago	4th
1986	82 kg - Wrestling – Sr. Freestyle	Challenge Cup International - Manchester	Bronze medal
1987	82 kg - Wrestling – Sr. Freestyle	Canada Cup International - Toronto	Silver medal
1988	90 kg - Wrestling – Sr. Freestyle	Canada Cup International - Toronto	Silver medal
1989	90 kg - Wrestling – Sr. Freestyle	Canada Cup International - Toronto	Silver medal
1989	90 kg - Wrestling – Sr. Freestyle	Challenge Cup International - Manchester	Gold medal
1990	90 kg - Wrestling – Sr. Freestyle	Canada Cup International - Toronto	Silver medal
1992	90 kg - Wrestling – Sr. Freestyle	Roger Coulon International - Paris	Gold medal
1998	95 kg - Wrestling – Sr. Freestyle	Canada Cup International - Guelph	Gold medal

==== Scholastic ====
Year	Category	Location	Medal/Rank
1981	70 kg – Wrestling – Freestyle	BC High School Championships - Vancouver	Bronze medal
1982	74 kg – Wrestling – Freestyle	BC High School Championships, Merritt	Gold medal
1985	76 kg - Wrestling – Collegiate	NAIA National Championships, Jamestown	4th
1986	80 kg - Wrestling – Collegiate	NAIA National Championships, Minot	Gold medal
