= Wrestling at the 1983 Pan American Games =

This page shows the results of the Men's Wrestling Competition at the 1983 Pan American Games, held from August 14 to August 29, 1983, in Caracas, Venezuela.

== Men's competition ==
=== Freestyle (– 48 kg) ===
| RANK | NAME |
|---|---|
| Gold medal | Cristóbal González (CUB) |
| Silver medal | Richi Salamone (USA) |
| Bronze medal | Carlos Villalta (VEN) |

=== Freestyle (– 52 kg) ===
| RANK | NAME |
|---|---|
| Gold medal | Ray Takahashi (CAN) |
| Silver medal | Charles Heard (USA) |
| Bronze medal | Alejandro Puerto (CUB) |

=== Freestyle (– 57 kg) ===
| RANK | NAME |
|---|---|
| Gold medal | Barry Davis (USA) |
| Silver medal | Rafael Torres (CUB) |
| Bronze medal | Orlando Cáceres (PUR) |

=== Freestyle (– 62 kg) ===
| RANK | NAME |
|---|---|
| Gold medal | Randy Lewis (USA) |
| Silver medal | Rey Esteban Ramírez (CUB) |
| Bronze medal | Bob Robinson (CAN) |

=== Freestyle (– 68 kg) ===
| RANK | NAME |
|---|---|
| Gold medal | Raúl Cascaret (CUB) |
| Silver medal | Lenny Zalesky (USA) |
| Bronze medal | Pat Sullivan (CAN) |

=== Freestyle (– 74 kg) ===
| RANK | NAME |
|---|---|
| Gold medal | Leroy Kemp (USA) |
| Silver medal | Candelario Ruiz (CUB) |
| Bronze medal | Ken Bradford (CAN) |

=== Freestyle (– 82 kg) ===
| RANK | NAME |
|---|---|
| Gold medal | José Damian (CUB) |
| Silver medal | Emilio Suárez (VEN) |
| Bronze medal | Chris Rinke (CAN) |

=== Freestyle (– 90 kg) ===
| RANK | NAME |
|---|---|
| Gold medal | Roberto Limonta (CUB) |
| Silver medal | Elio Francone (ARG) |
| Bronze medal | Peter Bush (USA) |

== Medal table ==
* Host nation (Venezuela)

| Rank | Nation | Gold | Silver | Bronze | Total |
|---|---|---|---|---|---|
| 1 | Cuba (CUB) | 13 | 3 | 4 | 20 |
| 2 | United States (USA) | 5 | 9 | 5 | 19 |
| 3 | Canada (CAN) | 2 | 2 | 5 | 9 |
| 4 | Venezuela (VEN)* | 0 | 4 | 1 | 5 |
| 5 | Mexico (MEX) | 0 | 1 | 3 | 4 |
| 6 | Argentina (ARG) | 0 | 1 | 0 | 1 |
| 7 | Puerto Rico (PUR) | 0 | 0 | 2 | 2 |
| Totals (7 entries) | | 20 | 20 | 20 | 60 |
