= Odnoin Bakhyt =

Mongolian wrestler

Personal information
- Nationality: Mongolian
- Born: 24 February 1954 (age 72)

Sport
- Sport: Wrestling

Odnoin Bakhyt (born 24 February 1954) is a Mongolian wrestler. He competed in the men's freestyle +100 kg at the 1980 Summer Olympics.
