= Wrestling at the 1979 Pan American Games =

This page shows the results of the Men's Wrestling Competition at the 1979 Pan American Games, held from July 1 to July 15, 1979, in San Juan, Puerto Rico.

== Men's freestyle ==
=== Freestyle (– 48 kg) ===
RANK	NAME
Gold medal	William Rosado (USA)
Silver medal	Miguel Alonso (CUB)
Bronze medal	Alfredo Olvera (MEX)

=== Freestyle (– 52 kg) ===
RANK	NAME
Gold medal	Gene Mills (USA)
Silver medal	Luis Ocaña (CUB)
Bronze medal	Jorge Olvera (MEX)

=== Freestyle (– 57 kg) ===
RANK	NAME
Gold medal	Joseph Corso (USA)
Silver medal	Juan Carlos Rodríguez (CUB)
Bronze medal	José Pinto (PAN)

=== Freestyle (– 62 kg) ===
RANK	NAME
Gold medal	Andre Metzger (USA)
Silver medal	Raúl Cascaret (CUB)
Bronze medal	John Park (CAN)

=== Freestyle (– 68 kg) ===
RANK	NAME
Gold medal	Andre Rein (USA)
Silver medal	José Ramos (CUB)
Bronze medal	Egon Beiler (CAN)

=== Freestyle (– 74 kg) ===
RANK	NAME
Gold medal	Leroy Kemp (USA)
Silver medal	Daniel Pozo (CUB)
Bronze medal	Mark Mongeon (CAN)

=== Freestyle (– 82 kg) ===
RANK	NAME
Gold medal	Daniel Lewis (USA)
Silver medal	Clark Davis (CAN)
Bronze medal	José Carvajal (CUB)

=== Freestyle (– 90 kg) ===
RANK	NAME
Gold medal	Roy Baker (USA)
Silver medal	José Poll (CUB)
Bronze medal	Richard Deschatelets (CAN)

=== Freestyle (– 100 kg) ===
RANK	NAME
Gold medal	Russell Hellickson (USA)
Silver medal	Bárbaro Morgan (CUB)
Bronze medal	Michael Kappel (CAN)

=== Freestyle (+ 100 kg) ===
RANK	NAME
Gold medal	Jimmy Jackson (USA)
Silver medal	Arturo Díaz (CUB)
Bronze medal	Wyatt Wishart (CAN)

== Men's Greco-Roman ==
=== Greco-Roman (– 48 kg) ===
RANK	NAME
Gold medal	Jorge Martínez (CUB)
Silver medal	Alfredo Olvera (MEX)
Bronze medal	Gregg Williams (USA)

=== Greco-Roman (– 52 kg) ===
RANK	NAME
Gold medal	Bruce Thompson (USA)
Silver medal	Zoilo Montano (CUB)
Bronze medal	Jorge Muñoz (MEX)

=== Greco-Roman (– 57 kg) ===
RANK	NAME
Gold medal	Leonel Pérez (CUB)
Silver medal	Brian Gust (USA)
Bronze medal	Henry Loret (PUR)

=== Greco-Roman (– 62 kg) ===
RANK	NAME
Gold medal	Douglas Yeats (CAN)
Silver medal	René Rodríguez (CUB)
Bronze medal	John Hughes (USA)

=== Greco-Roman (– 68 kg) ===
RANK	NAME
Gold medal	Howard Stupp (CAN)
Silver medal	Gary Pelci (USA)
Bronze medal	Eduardo García (CUB)

=== Greco-Roman (– 74 kg) ===
RANK	NAME
Gold medal	John Matthews (USA)
Silver medal	Idalberto Barban (CUB)
Bronze medal	Brian Renken (CAN)

=== Greco-Roman (– 82 kg) ===
RANK	NAME
Gold medal	Daniel Chandler (USA)
Silver medal	Erasmo Estrada (CUB)
Bronze medal	Luis Santerre (CAN)

=== Greco-Roman (– 90 kg) ===
RANK	NAME
Gold medal	José Poll (CUB)
Silver medal	Jerome Schmitz (USA)
Bronze medal	Steve Daniar (CAN)

=== Greco-Roman (– 100 kg) ===
RANK	NAME
Gold medal	Brad Rheingans (USA)
Silver medal	Bárbaro Morgan (CUB)
Bronze medal	Raúl García (MEX)

=== Greco-Roman (+ 100 kg) ===
RANK	NAME
Gold medal	Arturo Díaz (CUB)
Silver medal	William Lee (USA)
Bronze medal	Miguel Zambrano (PER)

== Medal table ==
* Host nation (Puerto Rico)

Rank	Nation	Gold	Silver	Bronze	Total
1	United States	14	4	2	20
2	Cuba	4	14	2	20
3	Canada	2	1	9	12
4	Mexico	0	1	4	5
5	Panama	0	0	1	1
5	Peru	0	0	1	1
5	Puerto Rico*	0	0	1	1
Totals (7 entries)		20	20	20	60

== See also ==
- Wrestling at the 1980 Summer Olympics
