= Adam Sandurski =

Polish freestyle wrestler (1953–2026)

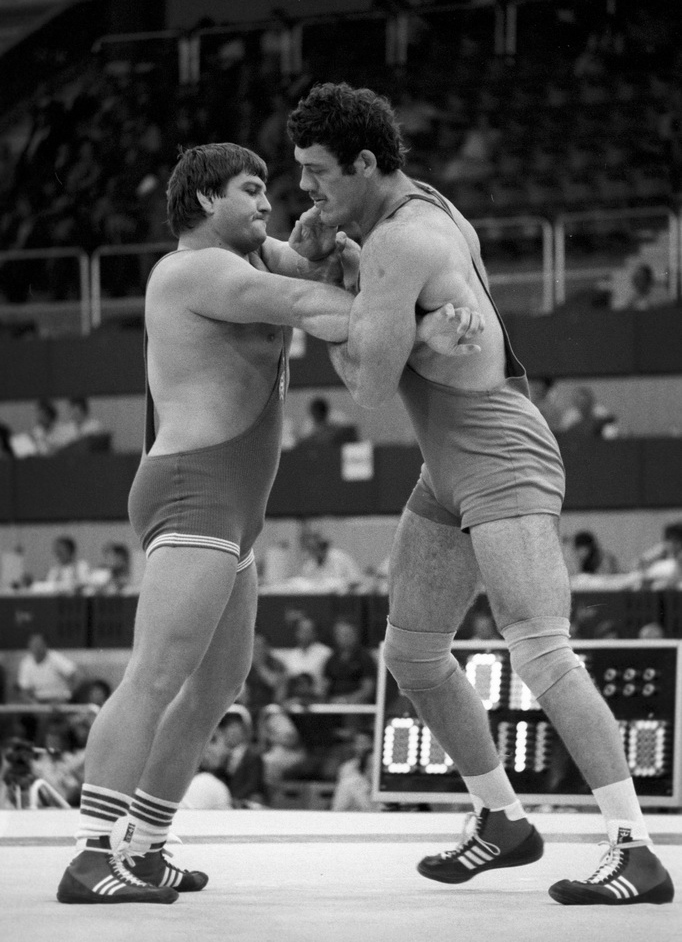
- Sandurski (right) at the 1980 Olympics

Personal information
- Born: 8 February 1953 Zarzecze, Poland
- Died: 21 February 2026 (aged 73) Witten, Germany
- Height: 214 cm (7 ft 0 in)
- Weight: 135 kg (298 lb)

Sport
- Sport: Freestyle wrestling
- Club: Stal Rzeszów
Medal record
Representing Poland
Olympic Games
Bronze medal – third place	1980 Moscow	+100 kg
World Championships
Silver medal – second place	1982 Edmonton	+100 kg
Silver medal – second place	1983 Kiev	+100 kg
Bronze medal – third place	1981 Skopje	+100 kg
European Championships
Bronze medal – third place	1979 Bucharest	+100 kg
Bronze medal – third place	1980 Prievidza	+100 kg
Bronze medal – third place	1981 Łódź	+100 kg
Bronze medal – third place	1982 Varna	+100 kg
Silver medal – second place	1984 Jönköping	+100 kg
Bronze medal – third place	1986 Pireus	-130 kg

Adam Sandurski (8 February 1953 – 21 February 2026) was a Polish heavyweight freestyle wrestler. He competed at the 1980 and 1988 Summer Olympics, winning a bronze medal in 1980. Between 1979 and 1986, he won three silver and six bronze medals at the world and European championships. Sandurski died on 21 February 2026, at the age of 73.
