= Andy Borodow =

Canadian wrestler (born 1969)

Personal information
- Full name: Andrew Mark Borodow
- Born: September 16, 1969 (age 56) Montreal, Quebec, Canada
- Education: College of William & Mary; Concordia University
- Height: 177 cm (5 ft 10 in)
- Weight: 130 kg (287 lb)

Sport
- Coached by: Victor Zilberman
Medal record
Men's wrestling
Representing Canada
Commonwealth Games
Gold medal – first place	1994 Victoria	Freestyle (Super Heavyweight)
Pan American Games
Silver medal – second place	1991 Havana	Freestyle (-130 kg)
Bronze medal – third place	1991 Havana	Greco-Roman (-130 kg)
Bronze medal – third place	1995 Mar del Plata	Freestyle (-130 kg)
Bronze medal – third place	1995 Mar del Plata	Greco-Roman (-130 kg)
Maccabiah Games
Gold medal – first place	1989 Israel	Greco-Roman wrestling
Gold medal – first place	1989 Israel	Freestyle wrestling
Gold medal – first place	1993 Israel	Greco-Roman wrestling
Gold medal – first place	1993 Israel	Freestyle wrestling

Andrew Mark Borodow (born September 16, 1969) is retired male wrestler from Canada. An Olympian, he won both the Maccabiah Games championship and the Commonwealth Games championship, and a silver medal in the Pan American Games. He was inducted into the Canada Wrestling Hall of Fame.

== Biography ==
Borodow was born in Montreal, Quebec, Canada, and is Jewish. He lives in Willowdale, North York, Toronto, Ontario, Canada. He attended and competed for the College of William & Mary and Concordia University. He trained in wrestling under Victor Zilberman.

He won the Canadian Senior National Championship in Freestyle in 1988, 1989, 1990, 1993, 1994, and 1996. Borodow won the Canadian Senior National Championship in Greco-Roman in 1989, 1990, 1993, 1994, 1995, and 1996.

Borodow twice represented Canada at the Summer Olympics at 130 kg (Super-Heavyweight): in 1992 in Greco Roman (coming in 5th), and in 1996 in freestyle (coming in 14th).

At the 1989 Maccabiah Games in Israel, Borodow won two gold medals. Borodow won two medals at the 1991 Pan American Games, a silver medal in freestyle and a bronze medal in Greco Roman. He competed for Team Canada in the 1993 Maccabiah Games, again winning two gold medals, one in freestyle and one in Greco Roman.

Borodow won bronze medals at the 1993 and 1995 Sumo World Championships, and a silver medal in 1996.

He won two bronze medals at the 1995 Pan American Games, one each in freestyle and Greco Roman. Borodow won a gold medal at the 1994 Commonwealth Games in freestyle.

Borodow was inducted into the Canada Wrestling Hall of Fame in 2016.

== See also ==
- List of Commonwealth Games medallists in wrestling
- List of Pan American Games medalists in wrestling
