= Chattanooga Mocs wrestling =

Wrestling team representing the University of Tennessee at Chattanooga

Chattanooga Mocs Wrestling
- University: University of Tennessee at Chattanooga
- Head coach: Kyle Ruschell (1st season)
- Conference: SoCon
- Location: Chattanooga, TN
- Arena: Maclellan Gymnasium (capacity: 2,639)
- Nickname: Mocs
- Colors: Navy, old gold, and silver

NCAA individual champions
- 6 (NCAA Division II)

All-Americans
- 24 (12 NCAA Division I, 12 NCAA Division II)

Conference championships
- 1994, 1998, 1999, 2000, 2002, 2005, 2006, 2007, 2008, 2009, 2010, 2011, 2013, 2014, 2015, 2016, 2019

Conference Tournament championships
- 1978, 1979, 1980, 1981, 1982, 1983, 1986, 1987, 1988, 1989, 1990, 1991, 1992, 1993, 1994, 1998, 1999, 2000, 2002, 2005, 2006, 2007, 2008, 2009, 2011, 2012, 2013, 2014, 2015

The Chattanooga Mocs wrestling team represents the University of Tennessee at Chattanooga (UTC) as a member of the Southern Conference (SoCon) in NCAA Division I wrestling. The Mocs host their home matches at the Maclellan Gymnasium on the university's campus in Chattanooga, Tennessee, United States. The Mocs' current head coach is Kyle Ruschell, a former 2-time All-American at the University of Wisconsin.

== History ==
The wrestling team at UTC began competing in the Southeastern Intercollegiate Wrestling Association (SEIWA) in 1947. The program joined NCAA Division II, when the NCAA started the new division in 1963. Under five coaches during the Division II era, 40 Mocs won 62 SEIWA individual championships, with the team placing as high as second at the 1976 NCAA Division II national tournament. The team had seven wrestlers earn twelve NCAA Division II All-American honors, with three wrestlers winning a total of six individual national championships.

The Mocs moved to NCAA Division I and the Southern Conference in 1978 and is the only NCAA Division I wrestling program in the state of Tennessee. Since joining the SoCon, the Mocs have been historically the most dominant SoCon team, winning 186 individual conference championships, 13 regular season league crowns (only awarded since 1992), and 28 conference tournament titles. During the NCAA Division I era, nine UTC wrestlers have earned twelve All-American honors. The team has placed as high as 21st at the 2005 and 2007 NCAA Division I national championships. Eight of nine Division I head coaches have been named SoCon Coach of the Year sixteen times, including twice by current coach Heath Eslinger.

== Head coaches ==
The Mocs' current head coach is Kyle Ruschell. Ruschell joined the Mocs staff in June 2018 as assistant coach. He was elevated to Interim Head Coach on July 19, following head coach Heath Eslinger's resignation and earned the full-time position on Aug. 10, 2019. Ruschell's staff includes assistant coaches TJ Ruschell and Hunter Gamble.

Coach	Years	W–L–T	%age	SoCon Tournament titles
Ken Carpenter	1947–51 (5)	N/A	N/A	--
Russ Scall	1952 (1)	3–5–0	.375	--
Andy Nardo	1953–67 (15)	77–30–4	.712	--
Joe Geri	1968 (1)	0–8–0	.000	--
Jim Morgan	1969–84 (16)	209–70–3	.746	6
Ethan Reeve	1985–90 (6)	57–38–2	.598	5
Ralph Manning	1991–95 (5)	33–26–0	.556	4
Mark Leen	1996–2001 (6)	43–35–1	.551	3
Frankie James	2002 (1)	9–8–0	.529	1
Terry Brands	2003–05 (3)	31–33–0	.484	1
Joey Seay	2006 (1)	16–8–1	.660	1
Chris Bono	2007–09 (3)	39–17–0	.696	3
Heath Eslinger	2010–2018 (9)	101–61–0	.623	5
Kyle Ruschell	2019–present (4)	22–20–0	.524	--

== Southern Conference 100th Anniversary Wrestling Team ==
The Southern Conference celebrated 100 years of operation in 2021. The league named 100th anniversary teams in each sport it currently sponsors and has sponsored for at least 25 years. Of all member schools (currently and former), the Chattanooga Mocs top the list with 23 wrestlers selected. Members of the 100th anniversary team must meet at least one of the following criteria: SoCon Hall of Fame Inductee (for primary sport), National Wrestler of the Year, National Champion, All-America in two different seasons (not including honorable mention or freshman AA), SoCon Male Athlete of the Year, Two-time SoCon Wrestler of the Year, Three-time SoCon Individual Champion, or 1st-team All-SoCon in three different seasons.

Name	Years
David Barden	1992–1996
Scottie Boykin	2013–2018
Charlie Buckshaw	1985–1989
Cody Cleveland	2005–2011
Josh Condon	2007–2013
John Davis	2002–2006
Chad Dennis	1991–1996
Heath Esthlinger	1995–2000
John Feldhacker	1981–1985
Bret Gustafson	1987–1992
Bobby Hanson	1997–2000
Charlie Heard	1981–1984
Michael Keefe	2002–2007
Matt Keller	2005–2007
Javier Maldonado	2003–2008
Larry Meierotto	1979–1983
Pat Murphy	1979–1983
Bobby Orand	1976–1980
Ben Reichel	1984–1989
Jeff Rufolo	1983–1988
Nick Soto	2011–2015
Chris Thornbury	1985–1989
Cary Waller	1978–1983
