= Doug Cox (wrestler) =

Canadian wrestler (born 1957)

Personal information
- Full name: Charles Douglas Cox
- Born: 8 October 1957 (age 68) Guelph, Ontario, Canada
- Height: 180 cm (5 ft 11 in)
- Weight: 90 kg (198 lb)
Medal record
Men's freestyle wrestling
Representing Canada
Pan American Games
Gold medal – first place	1987 Indianapolis	Freestyle (– 90 kg)

Charles Douglas Cox (born 8 October 1957) is a Canadian wrestler. He competed at the 1988 Summer Olympics and the 1996 Summer Olympics.
