= Youssef Diba =

Syrian wrestler

Personal information
- Nationality: Syrian
- Born: 7 August 1948 (age 77)

Sport
- Sport: Wrestling

Youssef Diba (born 7 August 1948) is a Syrian wrestler. He competed in the men's freestyle +100 kg at the 1980 Summer Olympics.
