= Andrei Ianko =

Romanian wrestler

Personal information
- Nationality: Romanian
- Born: 18 October 1958 (age 67) Băgara, Romania

Sport
- Sport: Wrestling

Andrei Ianko (born 18 October 1958) is a Romanian wrestler. He competed in the men's freestyle +100 kg at the 1980 Summer Olympics.
