= Miguel Alonso Cordero =

Cuban wrestler (born 1952)

Miguel Alonso
Personal information
- Full name: Miguel Tachin Alonso Cordero
- Nationality: Cuban
- Born: 18 July 1952 (age 73)
- Height: 153 cm (5 ft 0 in)
- Weight: 52 kg (115 lb)

Sport
- Sport: Wrestling
Medal record
Men's freestyle wrestling
Representing Cuba
Pan American Games
Silver medal – second place	1979 San Juan	48 kg

Miguel Tachin Alonso Cordero (born 18 July 1952) is a Cuban former wrestler who competed in the 1972 Summer Olympics and in the 1976 Summer Olympics.
