= Anibál Nieves =

Puerto Rican wrestler (born 1965)

Personal information
- Born: November 11, 1965 (age 60)
Medal record
Men's freestyle wrestling
Representing Puerto Rico
Pan American Games
Silver medal – second place	1991 Havana	62 kg
Silver medal – second place	1995 Mar del Plata	62 kg

Anibál Nieves Javier (born November 11, 1965) is retired male sport wrestler from Puerto Rico.

In High School, he placed 5th in NY State in 1984 at 126 lbs, wrestling for Ellenville High School. In college, he wrestled for East Stroudsburg University, where he achieved All-American status at the Division I level of the NCAA. He twice represented his native country at the Summer Olympics: in 1992 and 1996. Nieves also twice won a silver medal at the Pan American Games during his career. After coaching stints at Springfield Technical Community College (with both the men’s and women’s programs), American International College, Western New England University, he was hired as the head men’s and women’s coach at East Stroudsburg University. He was a nine-time Puerto Rican champion.
