= Paul Ragusa =

Canadian wrestler (born 1971)

Personal information
- Born: May 24, 1971 (age 55)
Medal record
Men's Wrestling
Representing Canada
Commonwealth Games
Silver medal – second place	1994 Victoria	Freestyle (– 48 kg)
Pan American Games
Silver medal – second place	1995 Mar del Plata	Freestyle (– 48 kg)
Silver medal – second place	1999 Winnipeg	Freestyle (– 54 kg)

Paul Ragusa (born May 24, 1971, in Bülach, Zürich) is retired male wrestler from Canada, who was born in Switzerland. He represented Canada at the 1996 Summer Olympics in Atlanta, Georgia, and twice won a medal at the Pan American Games during his career.
