= Alberto Rodríguez (wrestler) =

Cuban wrestler (born 1964)

Personal information
- Born: 9 October 1964 (age 61) Pinar del Río, Cuba

Sport
- Sport: Wrestling
Medal record
Representing Cuba
Pan American Games
Gold medal – first place	1995 Mar del Plata	Freestyle -74kg
Bronze medal – third place	1991 Havana	Freestyle -74kg
Central American and Caribbean Games
Gold medal – first place	1990 Mexico City	Freestyle -74kg
Gold medal – first place	1993 Ponce	Freestyle -74kg

Alberto Rodríguez (born 9 October 1964) is a Cuban wrestler. He competed in the men's freestyle 74 kg at the 1996 Summer Olympics.
