= Craig Roberts (wrestler) =

Canadian wrestler (1968–2006)

Personal information
- Born: June 6, 1968 Everett, Washington
- Died: September 12, 2006 (aged 38)
Medal record
Men's Wrestling
Representing Canada
Pan American Games
Silver medal – second place	1995 Mar del Plata	Freestyle (– 68 kg)

Craig Roberts (June 6, 1968 – September 12, 2006) was a male wrestler from Canada, who was born in Everett, Washington (United States). He represented Canada at the 1996 Summer Olympics in Atlanta, Georgia. Roberts won a silver medal at the 1995 Pan American Games, and won the 1991 68 kg Commonwealth title.
