= Alfredo Olvera =

Mexican wrestler (born 1948)

Personal information
- Full name: Alfredo Olvera González
- Nationality: Mexican
- Born: 4 January 1948 (age 78)
- Height: 154 cm (5 ft 1 in)
- Weight: 48 kg (106 lb)

Sport
- Sport: Wrestling
Medal record
Representing Mexico
Pan American Games
Men's Freestyle Wrestling
Bronze medal – third place	1979 San Juan	48 kg
Men's Greco-Roman wrestling
Silver medal – second place	1979 San Juan	48 kg

Alfredo Olvera González (4 January 1948 - 15 April 2025) was a Mexican wrestler. He competed at the 1972 Summer Olympics and the 1980 Summer Olympics.
