= Andrew Seras =

American wrestler (born 1962)

Personal information
- Born: December 4, 1962 (age 63) New York, New York, U.S.

Sport
- Country: United States
- Sport: Wrestling
- Weight class: 68 kg
- Events: Greco-Roman; Folkstyle
- College team: SUNY–Albany
- Club: New York Athletic Club
- Team: USA
Medal record
Men's Greco-Roman wrestling
Representing the United States
Pan American Games
Gold medal – first place	1991 Havana	68 kg
Silver medal – second place	1995 Mar del Plata	68 kg
Collegiate Wrestling
Representing SUNY–Albany
NCAA Division III Championships
Gold medal – first place	1985 Rock Island	158 lb
Silver medal – second place	1981 University Heights	134 lb
Bronze medal – third place	1983 Wheaton	142 lb

Andrew Seras (born December 4, 1962) is an American wrestler. He competed in the men's Greco-Roman 68 kg at the 1988 Summer Olympics. Seras was also a four-time NCAA Division III wrestling All-American at the University at Albany. Seras is also the cousin of famous Spanish teacher Janice Dohrman of Syosset.
