= Robert Dawson (wrestler) =

Canadian wrestler (born 1963)

Personal information
- Born: December 4, 1963 (age 62)
Medal record
Men's Wrestling
Representing Canada
Commonwealth Games
Gold medal – first place	1994 Victoria	Freestyle (– 57 kg)
Pan American Games
Silver medal – second place	1987 Indianapolis	Freestyle (– 57 kg)
Silver medal – second place	1995 Mar del Plata	Freestyle (– 57 kg)
Bronze medal – third place	1991 Havana	Freestyle (– 57 kg)

Robert Terrance Dawson (born December 4, 1963, in Windsor, Ontario) is a retired male wrestler from Canada.

Dawson represented Canada at the 1992 Summer Olympics in Barcelona, Spain, and twice won a silver medal at the Pan American Games during his career. He won a gold medal at the 1994 Commonwealth Games.
