= James Johnson (wrestler, born 1957) =

American wrestler and coach (1957–2019)

Personal information
- Full name: James Lee Johnson
- Born: April 24, 1957 Halifax County, North Carolina, U.S.
- Died: September 8, 2019 (aged 62) Phoenix, Arizona, U.S.

Sport
- Country: United States
- Sport: Wrestling
- Weight class: 100 kg (220 lbs)
- Event: Greco-Roman
- College team: Kentucky
- Club: Sunkist Kids Wrestling Club
- Team: USA
Medal record
Men's Greco-Roman wrestling
Representing the United States
Pan American Games
Silver medal – second place	1991 Havana	100 kg
Pan American Championships
Gold medal – first place	1986 Colorado Springs	100 kg
Silver medal – second place	1984 Mexico City	100 kg
Silver medal – second place	1994 Mexico City	100 kg
Bronze medal – third place	1988 Mexico City	100 kg
Bronze medal – third place	1992 Albany	100 kg

James Lee Johnson (April 24, 1957 – September 8, 2019) was an American Greco-Roman wrestler and coach. As an athlete, he won a gold medal at the Pan American Championships in 1986 and was a member of three US Greco-Roman World Teams. Johnson later served as the head Greco-Roman coach for the Sunkist Kids Wrestling Club and was a coach for the US Greco-Roman 2012 Olympic team.

== Early life ==
Johnson was born in Halifax County, North Carolina. He wrestled at D. H. Conley High School in Greenville, North Carolina. He became the first NCHSAA wrestling state champion at D. H. Conley High School in 1976. Johnson was also the first wrestler from North Carolina to become an All-American at the Junior Greco-Roman Nationals.

== College career ==
He wrestled collegiately at the University of Kentucky from 1977 to 1980. Johnson had a career record of 65–21 and won the Southern Open twice. He was a three-time Southeastern Conference medalist, including second-place finishes at the 1977 and 1980 SEC Championships, and was a member of UK's 1977 SEC championship team. Johnson was elected to the UK Athletics Hall of Fame in 2016.

== Greco-Roman and coaching career ==
Johnson would go on to have post-collegiate success in Greco-Roman wrestling, winning numerous medals in international senior level competitions and a gold medal at the Pan American Championships in 1986. He would make three US Greco-Roman World Teams.

Johnson placed fifth at the 1993 World Championships and was honored with USA Wrestling’s first Greco-Roman Wrestler of the Year award in 1993. He also competed at the 1989 World Championships and 1994 World Championships.

After competing, Johnson coached at dozens of national and international events, including the 2012 Olympics for Team USA. He was also on the training staff for the 2016 Olympics. For more than 15 years, he had served as the Greco-Roman head coach for the Sunkist Kids Wrestling Club.

In 2002, the James Johnson Award was founded and is presented annually to the top high school senior wrestler in Eastern North Carolina.

In 2007, he was inducted into the North Carolina Chapter of the National Wrestling Hall of Fame.

== Death ==
Johnson died in Phoenix, Arizona on September 8, 2019, at the age of 62. He was buried at Homestead Memorial Gardens in Greenville, North Carolina.
