= Gavin Carrow =

Canadian wrestler (born 1960)

Personal information
- Born: 10 August 1960 (age 65) Vancouver, British Columbia, Canada
- Height: 182 cm (6 ft 0 in)
- Weight: 100 kn
Medal record
Men's freestyle wrestling
Representing Canada
Pan American Games
| Bronze medal – third place | 1987 Indianapolis | 100 kg |

Gavin Carrow (born 10 August 1960) is a Canadian wrestler. He competed in the men's freestyle 100 kg at the 1992 Summer Olympics.
