= Enrique Aguilar (wrestler) =

Mexican wrestler (born 1969)

Personal information
- Full name: Enrique Aguilar Zermeño
- Nationality: Mexico
- Born: 1 November 1969 (age 56) San Luis Potosí City, Mexico
- Height: 1.57 m (5 ft 2 in)
- Weight: 54 kg (119 lb)

Sport
- Sport: Wrestling
Medal record
Representing Mexico
Pan American Games
Silver medal – second place	1995 Mar del Plata	Greco-Roman -48kg

Enrique Aguilar Zermeño (born 1 November 1969) is a Mexican wrestler. He competed in the 1996 Summer Olympics. Later, he worked as a wrestling coach and was considered one of the best Mexican wrestlers of all time.
