= Winston Santos =

Venezuelan wrestler (born 1968)

Personal information
- Nationality: Venezuelan
- Born: 5 March 1968 (age 58) Caracas, Venezuela

Sport
- Sport: Wrestling
Medal record
Representing Venezuela
Pan American Games
Silver medal – second place	1995 Mar del Plata	Featherweight
Bronze medal – third place	1991 Havana	Featherweight
Central American and Caribbean Games
Silver medal – second place	1993 Ponce	Featherweight

Winston Santos Fuentes (born 5 March 1968) is a Venezuelan wrestler. He competed in the men's Greco-Roman 62 kg at the 1996 Summer Olympics.
