= Matt Ghaffari =

Iranian-American wrestler and mixed martial artist

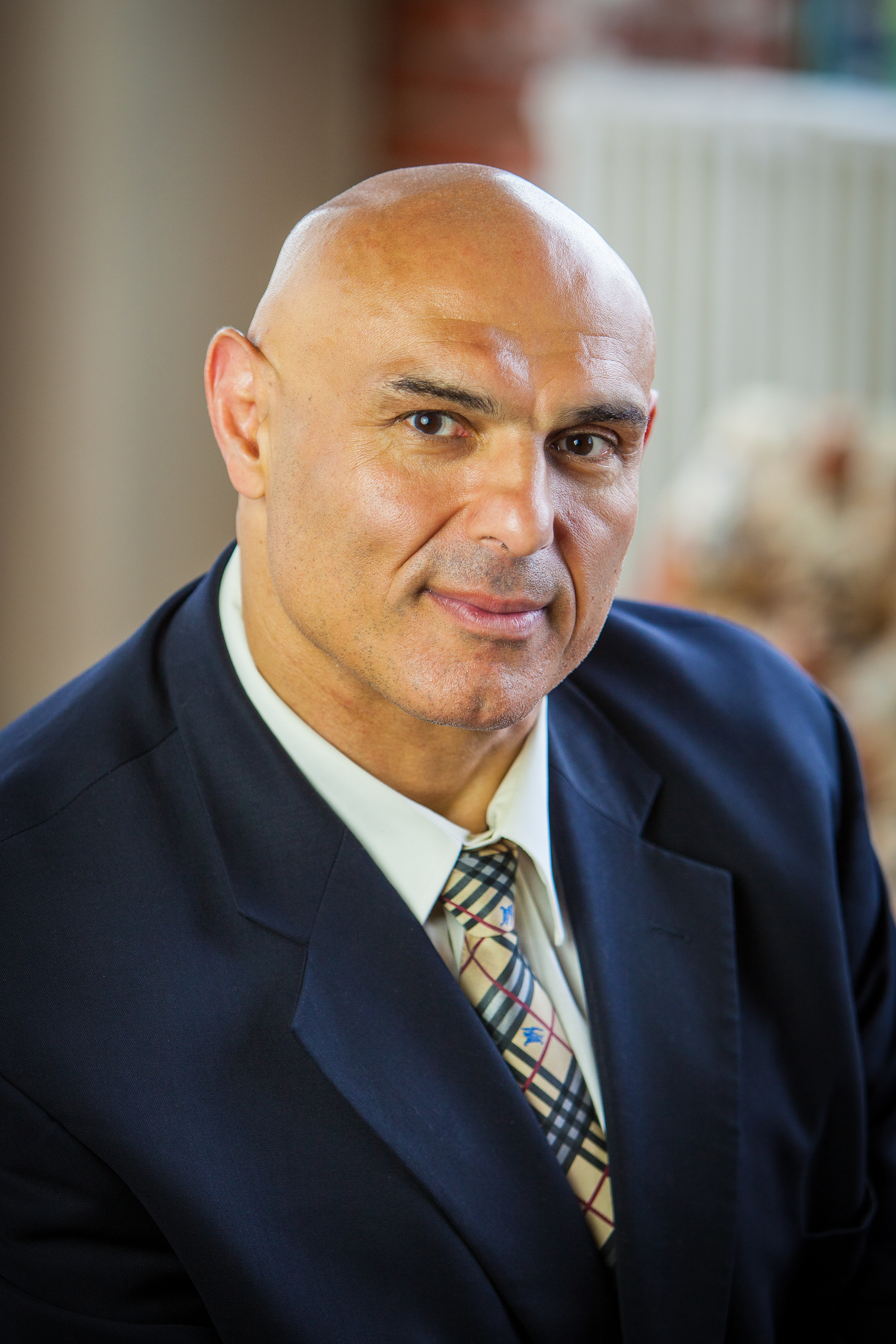
- Born: Siamak Ghaffari; November 11, 1961 (age 64); Tehran, Imperial State of Iran
- Education: Cleveland State University
- Years active: 1984–2000; 2002–2004
- Height: 1.93 m (6 ft 4 in)
- Sports career
- Country: United States
- Sport: Amateur wrestling
- Event: Greco-Roman
- University team: Cleveland State Vikings (1981–84); Fairleigh Dickinson Knights (1979–80)
- Club: Sunkist Kids
Medal record
Men's Greco-Roman wrestling
Representing the United States
Olympic Games
| Silver medal – second place | 1996 Atlanta | 130 kg |
World Championships
| Silver medal – second place | 1991 Varna | 130 kg |
| Silver medal – second place | 1998 Gävle | 130 kg |
| Bronze medal – third place | 1995 Prague | 130 kg |
World Cup
| Gold medal – first place | Gothenburg 1990 | 130 kg |
| Gold medal – first place | Thessaloniki 1991 | 130 kg |
| Gold medal – first place | Kecskemét 1994 | 130 kg |
| Gold medal – first place | Schifferstadt 1995 | 130 kg |
| Bronze medal – third place | Heinola 1993 | 130 kg |
Pan American Games
| Gold medal – first place | 1991 Havana | 130 kg |
| Gold medal – first place | 1995 Mar del Plata | 130 kg |
Pan American Championships
| Gold medal – first place | 1984 Mexico City | 130 kg |
| Gold medal – first place | 1989 Colorado Springs | 130 kg |
| Gold medal – first place | 1990 Colorado Springs | 130 kg |
| Gold medal – first place | 1992 Albany | 130 kg |
| Gold medal – first place | 1994 Mexico City | 130 kg |
Aleksandr Karelin Cup
| Silver medal – second place | 1995 Novosibirsk | 130 kg |
Grand Masters of Olympic Wrestling
| Silver medal – second place | 1990 Pittsburgh | 130 kg |
Men's Freestyle Wrestling
Representing the United States
Pan American Championships
| Gold medal – first place | 1990 Colorado Springs | 130 kg |
| Gold medal – first place | 1992 Albany | 130 kg |
- Martial arts career
- Division: Heavyweight

Mixed martial arts record
- Total: 1
- Wins: 0
- Losses: 1
- By knockout: 1

Other information
- Mixed martial arts record from Sherdog

Siamak "Matt" Ghaffari (/ɡəˈfɑːri/ gə-FAR-ee; Persian: سیامک غفاری, Persian pronunciation: [siːɒːmæk-e ɢæˈffɒːɾiː]; born November 11, 1961, in Tehran, Imperial State of Iran) is an Iranian-born American Greco-Roman wrestler, MMA fighter and professional wrestler. Ghaffari was a two-time USA Olympic team member, obtaining a silver medal at the 1996 Atlanta Summer Olympic Games. He also achieved two silver medals and one bronze in the World Championships. Ghaffari finished his career with the most Greco-Roman World and Olympic medals by a United States wrestler. He is considered the greatest Greco-Roman wrestler in American history, and is regarded as the standard for Greco-Roman wrestling in the United States.

In all, he won six national championships, four World Cups, two Pan American Games, seven Pan American Championships (including titles in 1990 and 1992 in freestyle wrestling), and 13 Grand Prix tournament titles. Coaches Anatoly Petrusian, Steve Fraser. Strength and Conditioning Trainer Jakob Panotas. He further represented his adopted country six times in World Championships and was twice named the United States Olympic Committee Greco-Roman Wrestler of the Year, in 1996 and 1998.

== Early life ==
Born in Tehran, Iran, Ghaffari came to the United States at a young age. He attended Paramus High School in Paramus, New Jersey.

== Greco-Roman wrestling career ==
He was runner-up to Aleksandr Karelin at the 1995 Karelin Cup. While representing the United States at the 1992 Barcelona Summer Olympic Games and 1996 Atlanta Summer Olympic Games, Ghaffari reached the final of the heavyweight Men's Greco-Roman 130 kg division at the latter, where he lost 0–1 to Russian overwhelming favorite Aleksandr Karelin in overtime. Ghaffari was a six-time United States wrestling champion and a two-time USA Olympic Committee Greco-Roman Athlete of the Year, in 1996 and 1998. Ghaffari ended with a 0–23 record against Karelin.

Ghaffari is currently the only American to win a combined four World and Olympic medals in Greco-Roman. Also, he holds 3 American Records the Most World and Olympic total medals, plus he was 4-time World Cup Champion, also 9-time Pan-American Champion. Ghaffari is the 2-time US Olympian and 2-time US Olympic team alternate.

In 2013, Ghaffari was inducted in the National Wrestling Hall of Fame as a Distinguished Member.

== Mixed martial arts career ==
In 2002, Ghaffari fought in the Tokyo Dome in front of 28,000 spectators at a mixed martial arts bout in UFO- Universal Fighting-Arts Organization against judo Olympic Silver Medalist Naoya Ogawa. Ghaffari managed to take Ogawa down and attack him with a brief ground and pound, but back to standing, Ogawa landed a punch which shifted Matt's left eye contact lens and forced him to quit.

=== Mixed martial arts record ===
Professional record breakdown
| 1 match | 0 wins | 1 loss |
| By knockout | 0 | 1 |
| By submission | 0 | 0 |
| By decision | 0 | 0 |

| Res. | Record | Opponent | Method | Event | Date | Round | Time | Location | Notes |
|---|---|---|---|---|---|---|---|---|---|
| Loss | 0–1 | (Japan) Naoya Ogawa | TKO (punch) | UFO Legend | August 8, 2002 | 1 | 0:56 | Tokyo, Japan | |

== Professional wrestling career ==
Matt Ghaffari
Professional wrestling career
- Ring name: Matt Ghaffari
- Billed height: 6 ft 5 in (196 cm)
- Billed weight: 280 lb (130 kg)
- Debut: 8 December 2002

In 1996, Ghaffari was scouted by professional wrestling promotion World Championship Wrestling, but did not sign with the company.

After his stint in MMA, Ghaffari started to work in the Japanese promotion Pro Wrestling ZERO-ONE, where he won the NWA Intercontinental Tag Team Championship with Tom Howard on December 15, 2002, by defeating Shinya Hashimoto and old opponent Naoya Ogawa. They held the championship until April 29, 2003, when they lost it to Hashimoto and Ogawa.

In 2004, Ghaffari made an appearance for HUSTLE, pinning Ogawa after a beatdown from the heel faction Monster Army (Mark Coleman, Kevin Randleman, Dusty Rhodes Jr., Giant Silva and Dan Bobish). He retired from wrestling in 2004.

=== Championships and accomplishments ===
- Pro Wrestling ZERO-ONE
  - NWA Intercontinental Tag Team Championship (1 time) – with Tom Howard
  - ZERO-ONE O-300 Super Heavyweight Championship (1 time)
