= Carlos Varela (wrestler) =

Cuban wrestler (born 1966)

Personal information
- Full name: Carlos Varela González
- Born: November 26, 1966 (age 59) Camagüey, Cuba
Medal record
Men's Wrestling
Representing Cuba
Pan American Games
Gold medal – first place	1987 Indianapolis	Freestyle (– 52 kg)
Gold medal – first place	1991 Havana	Freestyle (– 52 kg)
Silver medal – second place	1995 Mar del Plata	Freestyle (– 52 kg)

Carlos Varela González (born November 26, 1966, in Camagüey) is retired male wrestler from Cuba. He represented his native country at the 1996 Summer Olympics in Atlanta, Georgia, and twice won a gold medal at the Pan American Games during his career.
