= David Hohl =

Canadian wrestler (born 1966)

Personal information
- Born: March 25, 1966 (age 60) Winnipeg, Manitoba, Canada
Medal record
Men's wrestling
Representing Canada
Commonwealth Games
| Gold medal – first place | 1994 Victoria | Freestyle (– 74 kg) |
Pan American Games
| Silver medal – second place | 1995 Mar del Plata | Freestyle (– 74 kg) |
| Bronze medal – third place | 1991 Havana | Freestyle (– 82 kg) |

David E. Hohl (born March 25, 1966, in Winnipeg, Manitoba) is retired male wrestler from Canada. He twice represented Canada at the Summer Olympics: in 1992 and 1996. Hohl also twice won a medal at the Pan American Games during his career.
