= Reynaldo Peña =

Cuban wrestler (born 1969)

Personal information
- Born: 5 January 1969 (age 57) Havana, Cuba

Sport
- Sport: Wrestling
Medal record
Representing Cuba
Pan American Games
Gold medal – first place	1995 Mar del Plata	-90kg Greco-Roman
Gold medal – first place	1999 Winnipeg	-97kg Greco-Roman
Silver medal – second place	1991 Havana	-90kg Greco-Roman
Central American and Caribbean Games
Gold medal – first place	1998 Maracaibo	-97kg Greco-Roman

Reynaldo Rodolfo Peña Borroto (born 5 January 1969) is a Cuban wrestler. He competed at the 1992 Summer Olympics, the 1996 Summer Olympics and the 2000 Summer Olympics.
