= Alejandro Puerto =

Cuban wrestler (born 1964)

Personal information
- Full name: Alejandro Puerto Díaz
- Born: October 1, 1964 (age 61) Pinar del Río, Cuba
Medal record
Men's freestyle wrestling
Representing Cuba
Olympic Games
Gold medal – first place	1992 Barcelona	57 kg
World Championships
Gold medal – first place	1990 Tokyo	57 kg
Gold medal – first place	1994 Istanbul	57 kg
Pan American Games
Gold medal – first place	1987 Indianapolis	57 kg
Silver medal – second place	1991 Havana	57 kg
Bronze medal – third place	1983 Caracas	52 kg
Bronze medal – third place	1995 Mar del Plata	57 kg

Alejandro Puerto Díaz (born October 1, 1964) is a retired male wrestler from Cuba and Olympic champion in Freestyle wrestling.

Puerto competed at the 1992 Summer Olympics in Barcelona where he won a gold medal in the men's freestyle wrestling event, the bantamweight class.
