= Arturo Díaz (wrestler) =

Cuban wrestler (born 1954)

Personal information
- Full name: Arturo Díaz Mora
- Nationality: Cuban
- Born: 17 April 1954 (age 72)
- Height: 183 cm (6 ft 0 in)
- Weight: 128 kg (282 lb)

Sport
- Sport: Wrestling
Medal record
Representing Cuba
Pan American Games
Men's Greco-Roman wrestling
Gold medal – first place	1979 San Juan	+100 kg
Men's Freestyle wrestling
Silver medal – second place	1979 San Juan	+100 kg

Arturo Díaz Mora (born 17 April 1954) is a Cuban wrestler. He competed in two events at the 1980 Summer Olympics.
