= Alfredo Linares =

Peruvian pianist, composer, arranger and singer (born 1944)

- Also known as: Alfredito; Alfredo "Sabor" Linares
- Born: Alfredo Ángel Linares Saucedo; 27 January 1944 (age 82); Lima, Peru
- Genres: salsa, boogaloo, Latin jazz, Afro-Cuban jazz, son montuno, guaracha, pachanga
- Occupations: Pianist, singer, composer, arranger, record producer
- Instrument: Piano
- Years active: 1957–present
- Labels: MAG, Odeón-IEMPSA, Sonolux, Infopesa, INS, Velvet, Fidelis, DJ Gonzo Productions

Alfredo Ángel Linares Saucedo (born 27 January 1944), also known as Alfredito or Alfredo "Sabor" Linares, is a Peruvian pianist, singer, composer, arranger and record producer. He is associated with salsa, boogaloo, Latin jazz and related Afro-Caribbean styles, and has long been based in Cali, Colombia.

== Life and career ==
Linares was born in Barrios Altos, Lima, to Ángel Mariano Linares Salas, a piano repairer and musician, and Aurora Saucedo Murrugarra. At the age of ten he entered the National Conservatory of Music in Lima. There he studied piano and also learned trumpet, double bass, tenor saxophone, flute, bass and percussion. His early influences included the Cuban pianists Peruchín, Bebo Valdés and Lino Frías. After his father's death in 1957, he inherited the family group. His first recording was "A la Calle 13" with Ñico Estrada's Sonora Antillana; he later recorded "El Pompo" under his own name with the support of José "Pepe" Hernández of El Combo de Pepe.

By the 1960s Linares had completed his conservatory training and was working not only as a pianist but also on bass, trumpet, saxophone, flute, congas, bongos and timbales. During Peru's boogaloo boom, when the genre's Spanglish lyrics were still novel to many local musicians, he opted for a more jazz-oriented approach rather than simply reproducing the sound of New York City. This led to his first two LPs for MAG, El Pito (1968) and Yo Traigo Boogaloo (1969). He also appeared on recordings by José "Pepe" Hernández, Coco Lagos and Nilo Espinosa, and took part in jazz events organised by Jaime Delgado Aparicio.

From the end of the 1960s into the early 1970s, Linares worked internationally, first at the Humboldt Hotel in Guayaquil and then in Santiago and Buenos Aires. According to biographical accounts, one of the high points of this period was his appearance at the Festival Panamericano, held in February 1970 at Estadio Olímpico Pascual Guerrero in Cali, where he shared the bill with Sonora Matancera, El Gran Combo de Puerto Rico, Richie Ray & Bobby Cruz, Nelson y sus Estrellas and Los Supremos de Colombia. Around the same time he also recorded a 45 rpm single with Víctor "Kiko" Fuentes. Linares later recalled that Colombian audiences often assumed he was Cuban or Puerto Rican rather than Peruvian.

In 1972 he returned to Lima and recorded Sensacionales at Virrey studios for Sonolux, with some tracks recorded at Sonolux studios in Medellín. He then recorded Salsa...A Todo Sabor for Odeón, at a time when the word salsa was only beginning to appear prominently in album titles associated with artists such as Federico Betancourt and the Lebrón Brothers. Several successful 45 rpm releases for INS were later compiled on Mi Nuevo Ritmo (1974) and A Escondidas Llorarás (1975). One of the standout titles from this period was "Mambo Rock", a fusion of mambo and rock.

In 1976 Linares moved to Caracas as a producer and was engaged by the piano bar "Las Cien Sillas". There he recorded the second LP by Grupo Mango and later made the LP Salsa de Verdad, which was subsequently issued in Peru by Infopesa. In Venezuela he worked as an arranger, pianist and musical director with artists and groups including La Banda y su Salsa Joven, Billo's Caracas Boys, La Salsa Mayor, Los Pachecos, Jorge Beltrán y su Orquesta Los Peniques, Hender and José Luis Rodríguez.

In 1980 he released a Caracas-made production titled Lo Que Tengo, recorded at Fidelis studios and later issued by Velvet in Venezuela and by Gallo Records in New York City. After moving to Colombia, he worked as a producer for Codiscos and other labels on recordings by Piper Pimienta (Bombón de Chocolate), Lucho Puerto Rico (Salsa y Sentimiento and Son del Barrio), Eddy Guerra (Mi Dilema), Conjunto Renacer (Decididos), Sonero Clásico Calima (including Oye Mi Son), Grupo Clase (Cambio y Fuera), Son de Azúcar (Más Dulce), Willy Salsero (Si Te Deja el Tren), Luz Dary y su Orquesta (Brindemos con Salsa) and Cali Charanga (Al Pasito Cañandonga), among others.

In 1987, while in Lima collaborating with Perú All Stars, he recorded Ahora y Siempre: Alfredo Linares y su Salsa Stars at IEMPSA, with vocals by Julio Barretto, Walter Andrade ("Waltiño") and Raúl "Popeye" Villarán. He also recorded as a director and arranger with a group called Las Estrellas de la Máquina. According to later biographical accounts, a turning point came after Roberto Ernesto Gyemant wrote about him in Latin Beat Magazine in October 2005. Through producer Quantic, Linares entered a new cycle of recordings and European appearances. He subsequently collaborated with Holland-related projects such as the Quantic Soul Orchestra, Quantic and His Combo Bárbaro and Ondatrópica. Biographical profiles describe roughly a decade of touring in countries including England, France, Germany, the Netherlands, Belgium, Austria, the Czech Republic, Greece, Switzerland, Italy, Portugal and Finland.

He has continued to perform in the United States, Peru and Colombia. In 2014 he released the album Salsa Pa' Todo el Mundo, produced by DJ Gonzo Productions.

== Discography ==
=== Studio albums ===
- El Pito (MAG, 1968)
- Yo Traigo Boogaloo (MAG, 1969)
- Salsa...A Todo Sabor (IEMPSA, 1972)
- Sensacionales (Sonolux, 1973)
- Mi Nuevo Ritmo (INS, 1974)
- A Escondidas Llorarás (INS, 1975)
- Alfredito y su Salsa Star (1976)
- Lo Que Tengo (Fidelis, 1980)
- Salsa Pa' Todo el Mundo (DJ Gonzo Productions, 2014)

=== Selected collaborations ===
- José "Pepe" Hernández – El Combo de Pepe (IEMPSA, 1968)
- Coco Lagos – Descargas (MAG, January 1968)
- Coco Lagos – Ritmo Caliente (MAG, December 1968)
- Afroins – A Gozar Salsómanos con Los Afroins (INS, 1974)
- Grupo Mango – 1976 (CBS, 1976)
- La Salsa Mayor – De Frente y Luchando..! (Velvet, 1978)
- La Salsa Mayor – Sabrosa...! (Velvet, 1980)
- La Banda y su Salsa Joven – Tremenda Salsa con la Banda (1977)
- La Gran Banda de Venezuela
- Billo's Caracas Boys (1979)
- Los Pachecos (1977)
- José Luis Rodríguez "El Puma"
