= Charles Heard =

American wrestler

Personal information
- Nationality: American
- Home town: LaGrange, Georgia, U.S.
- Weight: 52 kg (115 lb)

Sport
- Country: United States
- Sport: Wrestling
- Events: Freestyle and Folkstyle
- College team: Chattanooga
- Team: USA
Medal record
Men's freestyle wrestling
Representing the United States
Pan American Games
Silver medal – second place	1983 Caracas	52 kg
Men's collegiate wrestling
Representing the Chattanooga Mocs
NCAA Division I Championships
Silver medal – second place	1983 Oklahoma City	118 lb
SoCon Championships
Gold medal – first place	1982 Lexington	118 lb
Gold medal – first place	1983 Chattanooga	118 lb
Gold medal – first place	1984 Charleston	118 lb

Charles "Charlie" Heard is an American former freestyle and folkstyle wrestler. He won a silver medal at the 1983 Pan American Games in freestyle wrestling at 52 kg. Heard was also an NCAA runner-up at the 1983 NCAA Division I Wrestling Championships at 118 lb.

== Early life ==
Heard attended Troup County High School in LaGrange, Georgia. He amassed a record of 101–2 in wrestling, while also playing baseball and football.

== College career ==
In college, Heard was a three-time NCAA All-American for the Chattanooga Mocs. He finished as the NCAA runner-up at the 1983 NCAA Division I Wrestling Championships. Heard was also a three-time SoCon champion, winning the Most Outstanding Wrestler award of the SoCon tournament in 1982 and 1984. He finished his college career with a 113–10 record. In 1992, Heard was inducted into the Chattanooga Athletics Hall of Fame.

== Freestyle wrestling ==
Heard represented the United States at the 1983 Pan American Games, where he won a silver medal in freestyle wrestling at 52 kg. He was also a two-time Olympic alternate.
