= Miguel Zambrano =

Peruvian wrestler (born 1951)

Personal information
- Full name: Miguel Zambrano de la Cruz
- Nationality: Peruvian
- Born: 21 September 1951 (age 74)
- Height: 182 cm (6 ft 0 in)

Sport
- Sport: Wrestling
Medal record
Men's Greco-Roman wrestling
Representing Peru
Pan American Games
Bronze medal – third place	1979 San Juan	+100 kg

Miguel Zambrano de la Cruz (born 21 September 1951) is a Peruvian former wrestler who competed in the 1972 Summer Olympics and in the 1980 Summer Olympics.
