= Shawn Sheldon =

American wrestler (born 1964)

Personal information
- Born: November 18, 1964 (age 61)

Sport
- Country: United States
- Sport: Wrestling
- Events: Greco-Roman and Folkstyle
- College team: SUNY-Albany
- Team: USA
Medal record
Men's Greco-Roman wrestling
Representing United States
World Championships
| Silver medal – second place | 1991 Varna | 52 kg |
Men's collegiate wrestling
Representing SUNY-Albany
NCAA Division III Championships
| Gold medal – first place | 1986 Trenton | 118 lb |
| Silver medal – second place | 1987 Buffalo | 118 lb |

Shawn Sheldon (born November 18, 1964) is an American amateur wrestler. He competed in the men's Greco-Roman 52 kg at the 1988 Summer Olympics and the 1992 Summer Olympics.

At the senior level of Greco-Roman wrestling, Sheldon was also a World silver medalist in 1991, and was third place at the Pan American Games in 1987 and 1991. He wrestled collegiately at SUNY-Albany, where he was a three-time NCAA Division III wrestling All-American and a national champion in 1986.

He worked as a consultant at the United States Olympic Training Center from 2002 until 2004, when he took over the Community Olympic Development Program for Palm Beach County, Florida.
