= Wrestling at the 1988 Summer Olympics – Men's freestyle 82 kg =

Wrestling at the 1988 Summer Olympics

Men's freestyle 82 kg at the Games of the XXIV Olympiad
- Venue: Sangmu Gymnasium
- Dates: 29 September–1 October 1988
- Competitors: 29 from 29 nations

Medalists
1st place, gold medalist(s)		Han Myung-woo	South Korea
2nd place, silver medalist(s)		Necmi Gençalp	Turkey
3rd place, bronze medalist(s)		Jozef Lohyňa	Czechoslovakia

The Men's Freestyle 82 kg at the 1988 Summer Olympics as part of the wrestling program were held at the Sangmu Gymnasium, Seongnam.

== Tournament results ==
The wrestlers are divided into 2 groups. The winner of each group decided by a double-elimination system.

Legend

- TF — Won by Fall
- SP — Won by Superiority, 12-14 points difference, the loser with points
- SO — Won by Superiority, 12-14 points difference, the loser without points
- ST — Won by Technical Superiority, 15 points difference
- PP — Won by Points, the loser with technical points
- PO — Won by Points, the loser without technical points
- P0 — Won by Passivity, scoring zero points
- P1 — Won by Passivity, while leading by 1-11 points
- PS — Won by Passivity, while leading by 12-14 points
- PA — Won by Opponent Injury
- DQ — Won by Forfeit
- DNA — Did not appear
- L — Losses
- ER — Round of Elimination
- CP — Classification Points
- TP — Technical Points

=== Eliminatory round ===
==== Group A ====
L		CP	TP		L
Round 1
1	Barthelémy N'To (CMR)	0-4 TF	2:28	Ahmad Afghan (IRI)	0
0	Han Myung-woo (KOR)	3-1 PP	6-2	Christopher Rinke (CAN)	1
0	Jozef Lohyňa (TCH)	4-0 ST	15-0	Pierre-Didier Jollien (SUI)	1
1	Matarr Jarju (GAM)	0-4 TF	3:24	Daniel Iglesias (ARG)	0
0	Atsushi Ito (JPN)	3-0 PO	4-0	Moustafa Ramadan Hussein (EGY)	1
0	Chi Man-hsien (TPE)	4-0 TF	4:19	Čedo Nikolovski (YUG)	1
0	Puntsagiin Sükhbat (MGL)	4-0 ST	15-0	Oumar N'Gom (SEN)	1
0	Francisco Iglesias (ESP)			Bye	
Round 2
1	Francisco Iglesias (ESP)	0-4 ST	0-15	Ahmad Afghan (IRI)	0
0	Han Myung-woo (KOR)	3-1 PP	2-1	Jozef Lohyňa (TCH)	1
1	Christopher Rinke (CAN)	3-0 PO	10-0	Pierre-Didier Jollien (SUI)	2
2	Matarr Jarju (GAM)	0-4 TF	1:35	Atsushi Ito (JPN)	0
1	Daniel Iglesias (ARG)	1-3 PP	5-10	Moustafa Ramadan Hussein (EGY)	1
1	Chi Man-hsien (TPE)	.5-3.5 SP	3-16	Puntsagiin Sükhbat (MGL)	0
1	Čedo Nikolovski (YUG)	3-1 PP	6-1	Oumar N'Gom (SEN)	2
1	Barthelémy N'To (CMR)			DNA	
Round 3
2	Francisco Iglesias (ESP)	0-3.5 SO	0-13	Han Myung-Woo (KOR)	0
1	Ahmad Afghan (IRI)	1-3 PP	6-7	Christopher Rinke (CAN)	1
1	Jozef Lohyňa (TCH)	4-0 TF	0:35	Daniel Iglesias (ARG)	2
0	Atsushi Ito (JPN)	4-0 TF	1:37	Chi Man-Hsien (TPE)	2
2	Moustafa Ramadan Hussein (EGY)	1-3 PP	4-6	Čedo Nikolovski (YUG)	1
0	Puntsagiin Sükhbat (MGL)			Bye	
Round 4
0	Puntsagiin Sükhbat (MGL)	4-0 ST	15-0	Ahmad Afghan (IRI)	2
0	Han Myung-woo (KOR)	3-0 PO	6-0	Atsushi Ito (JPN)	1
2	Christopher Rinke (CAN)	0-3 PO	0-10	Jozef Lohyňa (TCH)	1
1	Čedo Nikolovski (YUG)			Bye	
Round 5
2	Čedo Nikolovski (YUG)	0-3 PO	0-10	Han Myung-woo (KOR)	0
1	Puntsagiin Sükhbat (MGL)	0-3 PO	0-11	Jozef Lohyňa (TCH)	1
1	Atsushi Ito (JPN)			Bye	
Round 6
2	Atsushi Ito (JPN)	.5-3.5 SP	1-14	Jozef Lohyňa (TCH)	1
2	Puntsagiin Sükhbat (MGL)	1-3 PP	4-5	Han Myung-woo (KOR)	0

Wrestler	L	ER	CP
Han Myung-woo (KOR)	0	-	18.5
Jozef Lohyňa (TCH)	1	-	18.5
Puntsagiin Sükhbat (MGL)	2	6	12.5
Atsushi Ito (JPN)	2	6	11.5
Čedo Nikolovski (YUG)	2	5	6
Ahmad Afghan (IRI)	2	4	9
Christopher Rinke (CAN)	2	4	7
Daniel Iglesias (ARG)	2	3	5
Chi Man-hsien (TPE)	2	3	4.5
Moustafa Ramadan Hussein (EGY)	2	3	4
Francisco Iglesias (ESP)	2	3	0
Oumar N'Gom (SEN)	2	2	1
Matarr Jarju (GAM)	2	2	0
Pierre-Didier Jollien (SUI)	2	2	0
Barthelémy N'To (CMR)	1	1	0

==== Group B ====
L		CP	TP		L
Round 1
1	Ubaldo Rodríguez (PUR)	0-3 PO	0-11	Mohamad Zayar (SYR)	0
0	Victor Kodei (NGR)	3-1 PP	15-9	Martin Doyle (GBR)	1
1	Aleksandar Nanev (BUL)	0-3 PO	0-4	Mark Schultz (USA)	0
1	Andrzej Radomski (POL)	1-3 PP	9-12	Reiner Trik (FRG)	0
1	László Dvorák (HUN)	0-4 TF	1:44	Necmi Gençalp (TUR)	0
0	Hans Gstöttner (GDR)	4-0 ST	15-0	Mohammed Jabouri (IRQ)	1
0	Aleksandr Tambovtsev (URS)	3-0 PO	3-0	Jouni Ilomäki (FIN)	1
Round 2
2	Ubaldo Rodríguez (PUR)	0-4 TF	1:53	Victor Kodei (NGR)	0
0	Mohamad Zayar (SYR)	3-1 PP	6-1	Martin Doyle (GBR)	2
2	Alexander Nanev (BUL)	1-3 PP	1-4	Andrzej Radomski (POL)	1
0	Mark Schultz (USA)	4-0 ST	16-1	Reiner Trik (FRG)	1
2	László Dvorák (HUN)	0-3 PO	0-4	Hans Gstöttner (GDR)	0
0	Necmi Gençalp (TUR)	3-1 PP	5-4	Alexander Tambouvtsev (URS)	1
2	Mohammed Abdul-Sattar (IRQ)	0-3 PO	0-7	Jouni Ilomäki (FIN)	1
Round 3
1	Mohamad Zayar (SYR)	1-3 PP	1-7	Victor Kodei (NGR)	0
0	Mark Schultz (USA)	3-1 PP	8-1	Andrzej Radomski (POL)	2
2	Reiner Trik (FRG)	0-3 PO	0-8	Necmi Gençalp (TUR)	0
1	Hans Gstöttner (GDR)	1-3 PP	4-7	Alexander Tambouvtsev (URS)	1
1	Jouni Ilomäki (FIN)			Bye	
Round 4
1	Jouni Ilomäki (FIN)	3-0 P1	5:08	Mohamad Zayar (SYR)	2
1	Victor Kodei (NGR)	0-4 TF	1:41	Mark Schultz (USA)	0
1	Necmi Gençalp (TUR)	1-3 PP	6-8	Hans Gstöttner (GDR)	1
1	Alexander Tambouvtsev (URS)			Bye	
Round 5
1	Alexander Tambouvtsev (URS)	4-0 TF	2:40	Victor Kodei (NGR)	2
2	Jouni Ilomäki (FIN)	1-3 PP	1-2	Necmi Gençalp (TUR)	1
0	Mark Schultz (USA)	4-0 TF	2:02	Hans Gstöttner (GDR)	2
Round 6
1	Alexander Tambouvtsev (URS)	3-1 PP	7-3	Mark Schultz (USA)	1
1	Necmi Gençalp (TUR)			Bye	
Round 7
1	Necmi Gençalp (TUR)	3.5-0 SO	14-0	Mark Schultz (USA)	2
1	Alexander Tambouvtsev (URS)			Bye	

Wrestler	L	ER	CP	Tiebreaker
Necmi Gençalp (TUR)	1	-	17.5	3
Alexander Tambouvtsev (URS)	1	-	14	1
Mark Schultz (USA)	2	7	19	
Hans Gstöttner (GDR)	2	5	11	
Victor Kodei (NGR)	2	5	10	
Jouni Ilomäki (FIN)	2	5	7	
Mohamad Zayar (SYR)	2	4	7	
Andrzej Radomski (POL)	2	3	5	
Reiner Trik (FRG)	2	3	3	
Martin Doyle (GBR)	2	2	2	
Alexander Nanev (BUL)	2	2	1	
László Dvorák (HUN)	2	2	0	
Mohammed Abdul-Sattar (IRQ)	2	2	0	
Ubaldo Rodríguez (PUR)	2	2	0	

=== Final round ===
	CP	TP	
7th place match
Atsushi Ito (JPN)	3-1 PP	5-4	Hans Gstöttner (GDR)
5th place match
Puntsagiin Sükhbat (MGL)	4-0 PA		Mark Schultz (USA)
Bronze medal match
Jozef Lohyňa (TCH)	3-0 P1	7:54	Alexander Tambouvtsev (URS)
Gold medal match
Han Myung-woo (KOR)	3-0 PO	4-0	Necmi Gençalp (TUR)

== Final standings ==
1. Han Myung-woo (KOR)
2. Necmi Gençalp (TUR)
3. Jozef Lohyňa (TCH)
4. Alexander Tambouvtsev (URS)
5. Puntsagiin Sükhbat (MGL)
6. Mark Schultz (USA)
7. Atsushi Ito (JPN)
8. Hans Gstöttner (GDR)
