= Wrestling at the 1988 Summer Olympics – Men's Greco-Roman 82 kg =

Men's Greco-Roman 82 kg at the Games of the XXIV Olympiad
- Venue: Sangmu Gymnasium
- Dates: 20–22 September 1988
- Competitors: 21 from 21 nations

Medalists
1st place, gold medalist(s)		Mikhail Mamiashvili	Soviet Union
2nd place, silver medalist(s)		Tibor Komáromi	Hungary
3rd place, bronze medalist(s)		Kim Sang-kyu	South Korea

The Men's Greco-Roman 82 kg at the 1988 Summer Olympics as part of the wrestling program were held at the Sangmu Gymnasium, Seongnam.

== Tournament results ==
The wrestlers are divided into 2 groups. The winner of each group decided by a double-elimination system.

Legend

- TF — Won by Fall
- SP — Won by Superiority, 12-14 points difference, the loser with points
- SO — Won by Superiority, 12-14 points difference, the loser without points
- ST — Won by Technical Superiority, 15 points difference
- PP — Won by Points, the loser with technical points
- PO — Won by Points, the loser without technical points
- P0 — Won by Passivity, scoring zero points
- P1 — Won by Passivity, while leading by 1-11 points
- PS — Won by Passivity, while leading by 12-14 points
- PA — Won by Opponent Injury
- DQ — Won by Forfeit
- DNA — Did not appear
- L — Losses
- ER — Round of Elimination
- CP — Classification Points
- TP — Technical Points

=== Eliminatory round ===
==== Group A ====
L		CP	TP		L
Round 1
1	Roger Gössner (FRG)	0-3 P1	6:00	Tibor Komáromi (HUN)	0
1	Pavel Frinta (TCH)	0-4 TF	1:04	John Morgan (USA)	0
1	Barthelémy N'To (CMR)	0-4 TF	2:52	Moustafa Ramadan Hussein (EGY)	0
0	Angel Stoykov (BUL)	3.5-0 SO	14-0	Mehdi Moradi-Ganjeh (IRI)	1
1	Magnus Fredriksson (SWE)	1-3 PP	1-3	Stig Arild Kleven (NOR)	0
0	Oumar N'Gom (SEN)			Bye	
Round 2
1	Oumar N'Gom (SEN)	0-4 TF	1:06	Roger Gössner (FRG)	1
0	Tibor Komáromi (HUN)	4-0 DQ	5:16	Pavel Frinta (TCH)	2
0	John Morgan (USA)	4-0 DQ	5:50	Barthelémy N'To (CMR)	2
1	Moustafa Ramadan Hussein (EGY)	0-3 P1	2:50	Angel Stoykov (BUL)	0
2	Mehdi Moradi Ganjeh (IRI)	0-3 P1	5:13	Magnus Fredriksson (SWE)	1
0	Stig Arild Kleven (NOR)			Bye	
Round 3
1	Stig Arild Kleven (NOR)	0-3 P1	5:36	Roger Gössner (FRG)	1
0	Tibor Komáromi (HUN)	4-0 ST	17-0	Moustafa Ramadan Hussein (EGY)	2
1	John Morgan (USA)	0-0 DQ	5:48	Angel Stoykov (BUL)	1
1	Magnus Fredriksson (SWE)			Bye	
1	Oumar N'Gom (SEN)			DNA	
Round 4
1	Magnus Fredriksson (SWE)	3-1 PP	3-1	Roger Gössner (FRG)	2
1	Stig Arild Kleven (NOR)	3-1 PP	3-2	John Morgan (USA)	2
0	Tibor Komáromi (HUN)	3-1 PP	6-1	Angel Stoykov (BUL)	2
Round 5
2	Magnus Fredriksson (SWE)	0-3 P1	4:55	Tibor Komáromi (HUN)	0
1	Stig Arild Kleven (NOR)			Bye	
Round 6
2	Stig Arild Kleven (NOR)	0-3 PO	0-10	Tibor Komáromi (HUN)	0

Wrestler	L	ER	CP
Tibor Komáromi (HUN)	0	-	20
Stig Arild Kleven (NOR)	2	6	6
Magnus Fredriksson (SWE)	2	5	7
John Morgan (USA)	2	4	9
Roger Gössner (FRG)	2	4	8
Angel Stoykov (BUL)	2	4	7.5
Moustafa Ramadan Hussein (EGY)	2	3	4
Barthelémy N'To (CMR)	2	2	0
Mehdi Moradi Ganjeh (IRI)	2	2	0
Oumar N'Gom (SEN)	1	2	0
Pavel Frinta (TCH)	2	2	0

==== Group B ====
L		CP	TP		L
Round 1
0	Bogdan Daras (POL)	3-1 PP	3-2	Ernesto Razzino (ITA)	1
1	Ubaldo Rodríguez (PUR)	0-4 ST	0-15	Mikhail Mamiashvili (URS)	0
1	Takahiro Mukai (JPN)	0-3 PO	0-6	Maik Bullmann (GDR)	0
1	Daniel Iglesias (ARG)	0-4 ST	0-16	Kim Sang-kyu (KOR)	0
1	Timo Niemi (FIN)	0-3 P1	3:56	Goran Kasum (YUG)	0
Round 2
0	Bogdan Daras (POL)	4-0 ST	17-1	Ubaldo Rodríguez (PUR)	2
2	Ernesto Razzino (ITA)	0-3 P1	4:10	Mikhail Mamiashvili (URS)	0
1	Takahiro Mukai (JPN)	4-0 ST	15-0	Daniel Iglesias (ARG)	2
1	Maik Bullmann (GDR)	1-3 PP	3-5	Timo Niemi (FIN)	1
0	Kim Sang-Kyu (KOR)	3-0 PO	3-0	Goran Kasum (YUG)	1
Round 3
1	Bogdan Daras (POL)	0-3 P1	5:16	Mikhail Mamiashvili (URS)	0
2	Takahiro Mukai (JPN)	1-3 PP	2-4	Timo Niemi (FIN)	1
1	Maik Bullmann (GDR)	3-1 PP	7-6	Kim Sang-kyu (KOR)	1
1	Goran Kasum (YUG)			Bye	
Round 4
1	Goran Kasum (YUG)	3-0 P1	5:18	Bogdan Daras (POL)	2
0	Mikhail Mamiashvili (URS)	3-0 PO	11-0	Maik Bullmann (GDR)	2
1	Kim Sang-kyu (KOR)	3-1 PP	3-1	Timo Niemi (FIN)	2
Round 5
2	Goran Kasum (YUG)	1-3 PP	3-6	Mikhail Mamiashvili (URS)	0
1	Kim Sang-kyu (KOR)			Bye	
Round 6
2	Kim Sang-kyu (KOR)	0-3 PO	0-8	Mikhail Mamiashvili (URS)	0

Wrestler	L	ER	CP
Mikhail Mamiashvili (URS)	0	-	19
Kim Sang-kyu (KOR)	2	6	11
Goran Kasum (YUG)	2	5	7
Bogdan Daras (POL)	2	4	7
Maik Bullmann (GDR)	2	4	7
Timo Niemi (FIN)	2	4	7
Takahiro Mukai (JPN)	2	3	5
Ernesto Razzino (ITA)	2	2	1
Daniel Iglesias (ARG)	2	2	0
Ubaldo Rodríguez (PUR)	2	2	0

=== Final round ===
	CP	TP	
7th place match
John Morgan (USA)	4-0 DQ		Bogdan Daras (POL)
5th place match
Magnus Fredriksson (SWE)	0-2 P0	4:26	Goran Kasum (YUG)
Bronze medal match
Stig Arild Kleven (NOR)	1-3 PP	5-6	Kim Sang-kyu (KOR)
Gold medal match
Tibor Komáromi (HUN)	1-3 PP	1-10	Mikhail Mamiashvili (URS)

== Final standings ==
1. Mikhail Mamiashvili (URS)
2. Tibor Komáromi (HUN)
3. Kim Sang-kyu (KOR)
4. Stig Arild Kleven (NOR)
5. Goran Kasum (YUG)
6. Magnus Fredriksson (SWE)
7. John Morgan (USA)
