= Wrestling at the 1996 Summer Olympics – Men's freestyle 82 kg =

Men's freestyle 82 kg at the Games of the XXVI Olympiad
- Venue: Georgia World Congress Center
- Dates: 30–31 July 1996
- Competitors: 21 from 21 nations

Medalists
1st place, gold medalist(s)		Khadzhimurad Magomedov	Russia
2nd place, silver medalist(s)		Yang Hyung-mo	South Korea
3rd place, bronze medalist(s)		Amir Reza Khadem	Iran

The men's freestyle 82 kilograms at the 1996 Summer Olympics as part of the wrestling program were held at the Georgia World Congress Center from July 30 to July 31. The gold and silver medalists were determined by the final match of the main single-elimination bracket. The losers advanced to the repechage. These matches determined the bronze medalist for the event.

== Results ==
Legend

- WO — Won by walkover

=== Round 1 ===
	Score		CP
1/16 finals
Hidekazu Yokoyama (JPN)	9–1 Fall	Nicolae Ghiță (ROM)	4–0 TO
Orlando Rosa (PUR)	1–3	Serhiy Hubrynyuk (UKR)	1–3 PP
Aleksandr Savko (BLR)	2–3	Les Gutches (USA)	1–3 PP
Elmadi Zhabrailov (KAZ)	4–1	Magomed Ibragimov (AZE)	3–1 PP
Lukman Zhabrailov (MDA)	10–0	Cris Brown (AUS)	4–0 ST
Plamen Penev (BUL)	1–3	Ariel Ramos (CUB)	1–3 PP
Alioune Diouf (SEN)	0–3	Khadzhimurad Magomedov (RUS)	0–3 PO
Amir Reza Khadem (IRI)	3–0	Avtandil Gogolishvili (GEO)	3–0 PO
Sebahattin Öztürk (TUR)	2–3	Ruslan Khinchagov (UZB)	1–3 PP
László Dvorák (HUN)	6–2	Luis Varela (VEN)	3–1 PP
Yang Hyung-mo (KOR)		Bye	

=== Round 2 ===
	Score		CP
1/8 finals
Yang Hyung-mo (KOR)	4–2	Hidekazu Yokoyama (JPN)	3–1 PP
Serhiy Hubrynyuk (UKR)	0–4	Les Gutches (USA)	0–3 PO
Elmadi Zhabrailov (KAZ)	10–8	Lukman Zhabrailov (MDA)	3–1 PP
Ariel Ramos (CUB)	4–7	Khadzhimurad Magomedov (RUS)	1–3 PP
Amir Reza Khadem (IRI)	1–0	Ruslan Khinchagov (UZB)	3–0 PO
László Dvorák (HUN)		Bye	
Repechage
Nicolae Ghiță (ROM)	4–3	Orlando Rosa (PUR)	3–1 PP
Aleksandr Savko (BLR)	0–5	Magomed Ibragimov (AZE)	0–3 PO
Cris Brown (AUS)	2–8	Plamen Penev (BUL)	1–3 PP
Alioune Diouf (SEN)	2–6	Avtandil Gogolishvili (GEO)	1–3 PP
Sebahattin Öztürk (TUR)	5–2	Luis Varela (VEN)	3–1 PP

=== Round 3 ===
	Score		CP
Quarterfinals
László Dvorák (HUN)	0–2	Yang Hyung-mo (KOR)	0–3 PO
Les Gutches (USA)	1–2	Elmadi Zhabrailov (KAZ)	1–3 PP
Khadzhimurad Magomedov (RUS)		Bye	
Amir Reza Khadem (IRI)		Bye	
Repechage
Nicolae Ghiță (ROM)	3–5	Magomed Ibragimov (AZE)	1–3 PP
Plamen Penev (BUL)	1–4	Avtandil Gogolishvili (GEO)	1–3 PP
Sebahattin Öztürk (TUR)	7–1	Hidekazu Yokoyama (JPN)	3–1 PP
Serhiy Hubrynyuk (UKR)	0–3	Lukman Zhabrailov (MDA)	0–3 PO
Ariel Ramos (CUB)	3–2	Ruslan Khinchagov (UZB)	3–1 PP

=== Round 4 ===
	Score		CP
Semifinals
Yang Hyung-mo (KOR)	3–2	Elmadi Zhabrailov (KAZ)	3–1 PP
Khadzhimurad Magomedov (RUS)	4–0	Amir Reza Khadem (IRI)	3–0 PO
Repechage
Magomed Ibragimov (AZE)	6–4	Avtandil Gogolishvili (GEO)	3–1 PP
Sebahattin Öztürk (TUR)	5–1	Lukman Zhabrailov (MDA)	3–1 PP
Ariel Ramos (CUB)	3–1	László Dvorák (HUN)	3–1 PP
Les Gutches (USA)		Bye	

=== Round 5 ===
	Score		CP
Repechage
Les Gutches (USA)	2–3	Magomed Ibragimov (AZE)	1–3 PP
Sebahattin Öztürk (TUR)	5–4	Ariel Ramos (CUB)	3–1 PP

=== Round 6 ===
	Score		CP
Repechage
Elmadi Zhabrailov (KAZ)	WO	Sebahattin Öztürk (TUR)	0–4 PA
Magomed Ibragimov (AZE)	0–3	Amir Reza Khadem (IRI)	0–3 PO

=== Finals ===
	Score		CP
Classification 7th–8th
Les Gutches (USA)	3–0	Ariel Ramos (CUB)	3–0 PO
Classification 5th–6th
Elmadi Zhabrailov (KAZ)	WO	Magomed Ibragimov (AZE)	0–4 PA
Bronze medal match
Sebahattin Öztürk (TUR)	0–0	Amir Reza Khadem (IRI)	0–3 PO
Gold medal match
Yang Hyung-mo (KOR)	1–2	Khadzhimurad Magomedov (RUS)	1–3 PP

== Final standing ==
Rank	Athlete
1st place, gold medalist(s)	Khadzhimurad Magomedov (RUS)
2nd place, silver medalist(s)	Yang Hyung-mo (KOR)
3rd place, bronze medalist(s)	Amir Reza Khadem (IRI)
4	Sebahattin Öztürk (TUR)
5	Magomed Ibragimov (AZE)
6	Elmadi Zhabrailov (KAZ)
7	Les Gutches (USA)
8	Ariel Ramos (CUB)
9	Lukman Zhabrailov (MDA)
10	Avtandil Gogolishvili (GEO)
11	Hidekazu Yokoyama (JPN)
12	Plamen Penev (BUL)
13	Nicolae Ghiță (ROM)
14	László Dvorák (HUN)
15	Ruslan Khinchagov (UZB)
16	Serhiy Hubrynyuk (UKR)
17	Orlando Rosa (PUR)
17	Luis Varela (VEN)
19	Cris Brown (AUS)
19	Aleksandr Savko (BLR)
21	Alioune Diouf (SEN)
