= Wrestling at the 1992 Summer Olympics – Men's Greco-Roman 82 kg =

Men's Greco-Roman 82 kg at the Games of the XXV Olympiad
- Venue: Institut Nacional d'Educació Física de Catalunya
- Dates: 28–30 July 1992
- Competitors: 20 from 20 nations

Medalists
1st place, gold medalist(s)		Péter Farkas	Hungary
2nd place, silver medalist(s)		Piotr Stępień	Poland
3rd place, bronze medalist(s)		Daulet Turlykhanov	Unified Team

The men's Greco-Roman 82 kilograms at the 1992 Summer Olympics as part of the wrestling program were held at the Institut Nacional d'Educació Física de Catalunya from July 28 to July 30. The wrestlers are divided into 2 groups. The winner of each group decided by a double-elimination system.

== Results ==
=== Elimination A ===
==== Round 1 ====
	Score		CP
Daulet Turlykhanov (EUN)	9–0 Fall	Luis Rondon (VEN)	4–0 TO
Piotr Stępień (POL)	6–0	Ernesto Razzino (ITA)	3–0 PO
David Martinetti (SUI)	0–16	Pavel Frinta (TCH)	0–4 ST
Diego Potap (ARG)	0–10	Anton Arghira (ROM)	0–3 PO
Timo Niemi (FIN)	1–0	Hristo Hristov (BUL)	3–0 PO

==== Round 2 ====
	Score		CP
Daulet Turlykhanov (EUN)	2–3	Piotr Stępień (POL)	1–3 PP
Luis Rondon (VEN)	2–6 Fall	Ernesto Razzino (ITA)	0–4 TO
David Martinetti (SUI)	5–0 Fall	Diego Potap (ARG)	4–0 TO
Pavel Frinta (TCH)	2–4	Timo Niemi (FIN)	1–3 PP
Anton Arghira (ROM)	0–4	Hristo Hristov (BUL)	0–3 PO

==== Round 3 ====
	Score		CP
Daulet Turlykhanov (EUN)	8–0	Ernesto Razzino (ITA)	3–0 PO
Piotr Stępień (POL)	7–1	David Martinetti (SUI)	3–1 PP
Pavel Frinta (TCH)	0–0	Hristo Hristov (BUL)	0–0 D2
Anton Arghira (ROM)	0–3	Timo Niemi (FIN)	0–3 PO

==== Round 4 ====
	Score		CP
Daulet Turlykhanov (EUN)	1–0	Timo Niemi (FIN)	3–0 PO
Piotr Stępień (POL)		Bye	

==== Round 5 ====
	Score		CP
Piotr Stępień (POL)	3–0	Timo Niemi (FIN)	3–0 PO
Daulet Turlykhanov (EUN)		Bye	

==== Summary ====
Pos	Athlete	Pld	W	L	R	CP	TP
1	Piotr Stępień (POL)	4	4	0	X (Note: Classification points: POL 6, EUN 4, FIN 0)	12	19
2	Daulet Turlykhanov (EUN)	4	3	1	X	11	20
3	Timo Niemi (FIN)	5	3	2	X	9	8
4	Pavel Frinta (TCH)	3	1	2	3	5	18
5	David Martinetti (SUI)	3	1	2	3	5	6
—	Ernesto Razzino (ITA)	3	1	2	3	4	6
—	Hristo Hristov (BUL)	3	1	2	3	3	4
—	Anton Arghira (ROM)	3	1	2	3	3	10
—	Luis Rondon (VEN)	2	0	2	2	0	2
—	Diego Potap (ARG)	2	0	2	2	0	0

Source: Official Report

=== Elimination B ===
==== Round 1 ====
	Score		CP
Magnus Fredriksson (SWE)	1–0	Jean-Pierre Wafflard (BEL)	3–0 PO
Thomas Zander (GER)	5–2	Park Myung-suk (KOR)	3–1 PP
Péter Farkas (HUN)	4–1	Goran Kasum (IOP)	3–1 PP
Mohyeldin Ramadan Hussein (EGY)	0–4	Dan Henderson (USA)	0–3 PO
Leonidas Pappas (GRE)	0–2	Martial Mischler (FRA)	0–3 PO

==== Round 2 ====
	Score		CP
Magnus Fredriksson (SWE)	0–1	Thomas Zander (GER)	0–3 PO
Jean-Pierre Wafflard (BEL)	0–3	Park Myung-suk (KOR)	0–3 PO
Péter Farkas (HUN)	2–0	Mohyeldin Ramadan Hussein (EGY)	3–0 PO
Goran Kasum (IOP)	3–0	Leonidas Pappas (GRE)	3–0 PO
Dan Henderson (USA)	7–2	Martial Mischler (FRA)	3–1 PP

==== Round 3 ====
	Score		CP
Magnus Fredriksson (SWE)	2–1	Park Myung-suk (KOR)	3–1 PP
Thomas Zander (GER)	0–1	Péter Farkas (HUN)	0–3 PO
Goran Kasum (IOP)	2–0	Dan Henderson (USA)	3–0 PO
Martial Mischler (FRA)		Bye	

==== Round 4 ====
	Score		CP
Martial Mischler (FRA)	0–2	Magnus Fredriksson (SWE)	0–3 PO
Thomas Zander (GER)	0–0	Goran Kasum (IOP)	0–0 D2
Péter Farkas (HUN)	2–0	Dan Henderson (USA)	3–0 PO

==== Round 5 ====
	Score		CP
Magnus Fredriksson (SWE)	0–2	Péter Farkas (HUN)	0–3 PO
Thomas Zander (GER)	6–0	Dan Henderson (USA)	3–0 PO

- Thomas Zander (GER) and Dan Henderson (USA) were tied on classification points for fourth.

==== Summary ====
Pos	Athlete	Pld	W	L	R	CP	TP
1	Péter Farkas (HUN)	5	5	0	X (Note: HUN 3–0 SWE)	15	11
2	Magnus Fredriksson (SWE)	5	3	2	X	9	5
3	Goran Kasum (IOP)	4	2	2	4	7	6
4	Thomas Zander (GER)	5	3	2	4	9	12
5	Dan Henderson (USA)	5	2	3	4	6	11
—	Martial Mischler (FRA)	3	1	2	4	4	4
—	Park Myung-suk (KOR)	3	1	2	3	5	6
—	Jean-Pierre Wafflard (BEL)	2	0	2	2	0	0
—	Mohyeldin Ramadan Hussein (EGY)	2	0	2	2	0	0
—	Leonidas Pappas (GRE)	2	0	2	2	0	0

Source: Official Report

=== Finals ===
	Score		CP
9th place match
David Martinetti (SUI)	7–2	Dan Henderson (USA)	3–1 PP
7th place match
Pavel Frinta (TCH)	1–3	Thomas Zander (GER)	1–3 PP
5th place match
Timo Niemi (FIN)	3–1	Goran Kasum (IOP)	3–1 PP
Bronze medal match
Daulet Turlykhanov (EUN)	2–0	Magnus Fredriksson (SWE)	3–0 PO
Gold medal match
Piotr Stępień (POL)	1–6	Péter Farkas (HUN)	1–3 PP

== Final standing ==
Rank	Athlete
1st place, gold medalist(s)	Péter Farkas (HUN)
2nd place, silver medalist(s)	Piotr Stępień (POL)
3rd place, bronze medalist(s)	Daulet Turlykhanov (EUN)
4	Magnus Fredriksson (SWE)
5	Timo Niemi (FIN)
6	Goran Kasum (IOP)
7	Thomas Zander (GER)
8	Pavel Frinta (TCH)
9	David Martinetti (SUI)
10	Dan Henderson (USA)
