= Cameroon at the 1988 Summer Olympics =

- IOC code: CMR
- NOC: Cameroon Olympic and Sports Committee

in Seoul
- Competitors: 15 (13 men, 2 women) in 4 sports
- Flag bearer: Frédéric Ebong-Salle
- Medals: Gold 0 Silver 0 Bronze 0 Total 0

Summer Olympics appearances (overview)
- 1964; 1968; 1972; 1976; 1980; 1984; 1988; 1992; 1996; 2000; 2004; 2008; 2012; 2016; 2020; 2024

Cameroon was represented at the 1988 Summer Olympics in Seoul, South Korea by the Cameroon Olympic and Sports Committee.

In total, 15 athletes including 13 men and two women represented Cameroon in four different sports including athletics, boxing, weightlifting and wrestling.

== Competitors ==
In total, 15 athletes represented Cameroon at the 1988 Summer Olympics in Seoul, South Korea across four different sports.

Sport	Men	Women	Total
Athletics	3	2	5
Boxing	4	–	4
Weightlifting	2	–	2
Wrestling	4	–	4
Total	13	2	15

== Athletics ==
In total, five Cameroonian athletes participated in the athletics events – Samuel Nchinda-Kaya in the men's 100 metres and the men's 200 metres, Ernest Tché-Noubossie in the men's 400 metres, Assumpta Achuo-Bei in the women's 400 metres and the women's 800 metres, Frédéric Ebong-Salle in the men's long jump and Jeanne-Nicole Ngo Minyemeck in the women's shot put and the women's discus throw.

Athlete	Event	Heat Round 1		Heat Round 2		Semifinal		Final	
Athlete	Event	Time	Rank	Time	Rank	Time	Rank	Time	Rank
Samuel Nchinda-Kaya	Men's 100 metres	10.60	47	Did not advance					
Samuel Nchinda-Kaya	Men's 200 metres	21.45	35 q	21.39	35	Did not advance			
Ernest Tché-Noubossie (Note: otherwise Ernest Tché Noubossie; also competed at the 1984 Summer Olympics)	Men's 400 metres	48.31	48	Did not advance					
Assumpta Achuo-Bei	Women's 400 metres	55.22	35	Did not advance					
Assumpta Achuo-Bei	Women's 800 metres	2:07.10	25	—		Did not advance			

Athlete	Event	Qualification		Final	
Athlete	Event	Distance	Position	Distance	Position
Frédéric Ebong-Salle	Men's long jump	7.65	19	Did not advance	
Jeanne-Nicole Ngo Minyemeck	Women's shot put	12.73	24	Did not advance	
Jeanne-Nicole Ngo Minyemeck	Women's discus throw	NM		Did not advance	

== Boxing ==
In total, four Cameroonian athletes participated in the boxing events – Jean-Paul Bonatou in the lightweight category, Martin N'Dongo Ebanga in the light welterweight, François Mayo in the light middleweight category and Paul Kamela in the middleweight category.

Athlete	Event	Round of 64	Round of 32	Round of 16	Quarterfinals	Semifinals	Final	
Athlete	Event	Opposition Result	Opposition Result	Opposition Result	Opposition Result	Opposition Result	Opposition Result	Rank
Jean-Paul Bonatou	Lightweight	Bye	Turu (HUN); L 0–5	Did not advance				
Martin N'Dongo Ebanga	Light welterweight	Wester (ARU); W RSC R1	Kamau (KEN); L 0–5	Did not advance				
François Mayo	Light middleweight	Wiawindi (CAF); W RSC R1	Franek (TCH); L RSC R2	Did not advance				
Paul Kamela	Middleweight	Bye	Ioannidis (GRE); W 3–2	Sande (KEN); L 0–5	Did not advance			

== Weightlifting ==
In total, two Cameroonian athletes participated in the weightlifting events – Théodore Nkwayed in the –100 kg category and Dieudonné Takou in the +110 kg category.

Athlete	Event	Snatch		Clean & jerk		Total	Rank
Athlete	Event	Result	Rank	Result	Rank	Total	Rank
Théodore Nkwayed	–100 kg	145.0	16	175.0	14	320.0	14
Dieudonné Takou	+110 kg	140.0	15	190.0	11	330.0	14

== Wrestling ==
In total, four Cameroonian athletes participated in the wrestling events – Jean Manga in the Greco-Roman –74 kg category and the freestyle –74 kg category, Barthelémy N'To in the Greco-Roman –82 kg category and the freestyle –82 kg category, Jean-Baptiste Youmbi in the Greco-Roman –90 kg category and the freestyle –90 kg category and François Yinga in the freestyle –62 kg category.

Athlete	Event	Group Stage								Final	
Athlete	Event	Opposition Result	Opposition Result	Opposition Result	Opposition Result	Opposition Result	Opposition Result	Opposition Result	Rank	Opposition Result	Rank
Jean Manga	–74 kg	Velichkov (BUL); L 0–16	Kim (KOR); L Fall	Did not advance				—	8	Did not advance	
Barthelémy N'To	–82 kg	Hussein (EGY); L Fall	Morgan (USA); L DQ	Did not advance				—	9	Did not advance	
Jean-Baptiste Youmbi	–90 kg	Bye	Guèye (SEN); W 11–5	Steinbach (FRG); L Passivity	Koskela (FIN); L Fall	Did not advance		—	6	Did not advance	

Athlete	Event	Group Stage								Final	
Athlete	Event	Opposition Result	Opposition Result	Opposition Result	Opposition Result	Opposition Result	Opposition Result	Opposition Result	Rank	Opposition Result	Rank
François Yinga	–62 kg	Kaygusuz (TUR); L Fall	Bohay (CAN); L Fall	Did not advance					10	Did not advance	
Jean Manga	–74 kg	Sofiadi (BUL); L Fall	Bye	Hara (JPN); L Fall	Did not advance				9	Did not advance	
Barthelémy N'To	–82 kg	Afghan (IRI); L Fall	Did not advance					—	15	Did not advance	
Jean-Baptiste Youmbi	–90 kg	Khadartsev (URS); L 0–15	Kim (KOR); L Passivity	Did not advance					12	Did not advance	
