= Wrestling at the 1992 Summer Olympics – Men's freestyle 82 kg =

Men's freestyle 82 kg at the Games of the XXV Olympiad
- Venue: Institut Nacional d'Educació Física de Catalunya
- Dates: 5–7 August 1992
- Competitors: 19 from 19 nations

Medalists
1st place, gold medalist(s)		Kevin Jackson	United States
2nd place, silver medalist(s)		Elmadi Zhabrailov	Unified Team
3rd place, bronze medalist(s)		Rasoul Khadem	Iran

The men's freestyle 82 kilograms at the 1992 Summer Olympics as part of the wrestling program were held at the Institut Nacional d'Educació Física de Catalunya from 5 August to 7 August. The wrestlers are divided into 2 groups. The winner of each group decided by a double-elimination system.

== Results ==
Legend

- WO — Won by walkover

=== Elimination A ===
==== Round 1 ====
	Score		CP
Alcide Legrand (FRA)	0–6	Jozef Lohyňa (TCH)	0–3 PO
Roberto Neves Filho (BRA)	1–16	Nicolae Ghiță (ROM)	0–4 ST
Atsushi Ito (JPN)	0–7	Elmadi Zhabrailov (EUN)	0–3 PO
László Dvorák (HUN)	2–0	Enekpedekumoh Okporu (NGR)	3–0 PO
Hans Gstöttner (GER)	3–2	Rahmat Sofiadi (BUL)	3–1 PP

==== Round 2 ====
	Score		CP
Alcide Legrand (FRA)	15–0	Roberto Neves Filho (BRA)	4–0 ST
Jozef Lohyňa (TCH)	4–2	Nicolae Ghiță (ROM)	3–1 PP
Atsushi Ito (JPN)	0–8	László Dvorák (HUN)	0–3 PO
Elmadi Zhabrailov (EUN)	2–1	Hans Gstöttner (GER)	3–1 PP
Enekpedekumoh Okporu (NGR)	1–4	Rahmat Sofiadi (BUL)	1–3 PP

==== Round 3 ====
	Score		CP
Alcide Legrand (FRA)	2–3	Nicolae Ghiță (ROM)	1–3 PP
Jozef Lohyňa (TCH)	7–8	Elmadi Zhabrailov (EUN)	1–3 PP
László Dvorák (HUN)	2–4	Hans Gstöttner (GER)	1–3 PP
Rahmat Sofiadi (BUL)		Bye	

==== Round 4 ====
	Score		CP
Rahmat Sofiadi (BUL)	2–3	Jozef Lohyňa (TCH)	1–3 PP
Nicolae Ghiță (ROM)	3–6	Hans Gstöttner (GER)	1–3 PP
Elmadi Zhabrailov (EUN)	1–0	László Dvorák (HUN)	3–0 PO

==== Round 5 ====
	Score		CP
Jozef Lohyňa (TCH)	1–5	Hans Gstöttner (GER)	1–3 PP
Elmadi Zhabrailov (EUN)		Bye	

==== Summary ====
Pos	Athlete	Pld	W	L	R	CP	TP
1	Elmadi Zhabrailov (EUN)	4	4	0	X (Note: Classification points: EUN 6, GER 4, TCH 2)	12	18
2	Hans Gstöttner (GER)	5	4	1	X	13	19
3	Jozef Lohyňa (TCH)	5	3	2	X	11	21
4	Nicolae Ghiță (ROM)	4	2	2	4	9	24
5	László Dvorák (HUN)	4	2	2	4	7	12
—	Rahmat Sofiadi (BUL)	3	1	2	4	5	8
—	Alcide Legrand (FRA)	3	1	2	3	5	17
—	Enekpedekumoh Okporu (NGR)	2	0	2	2	1	1
—	Roberto Neves Filho (BRA)	2	0	2	2	0	1
—	Atsushi Ito (JPN)	2	0	2	2	0	0

Source: Official Report

=== Elimination B ===
==== Round 1 ====
	Score		CP
Sebahattin Öztürk (TUR)	0–1	Kevin Jackson (USA)	0–3 PO
Robert Kostecki (POL)	0–9	Rasoul Khadem (IRI)	0–3 PO
David Hohl (CAN)	3–2	Pekka Rauhala (FIN)	3–1 PP
José Betancourt (PUR)	2–11	Francisco Iglesias (ESP)	1–3 PP
Nergüin Tümennast (MGL)		Bye	

==== Round 2 ====
	Score		CP
Nergüin Tümennast (MGL)	WO	Sebahattin Öztürk (TUR)	0–4 EF
Kevin Jackson (USA)	4–3	Robert Kostecki (POL)	3–1 PP
Rasoul Khadem (IRI)	5–2	David Hohl (CAN)	3–1 PP
Pekka Rauhala (FIN)	8–5	José Betancourt (PUR)	3–1 PP
Francisco Iglesias (ESP)		Bye	

- Nergüin Tümennast (MGL) was disqualified.

==== Round 3 ====
	Score		CP
Francisco Iglesias (ESP)	3–6	Sebahattin Öztürk (TUR)	1–3 PP
Kevin Jackson (USA)	3–2	David Hohl (CAN)	3–1 PP
Rasoul Khadem (IRI)	8–0	Pekka Rauhala (FIN)	3–0 PO

==== Round 4 ====
	Score		CP
Francisco Iglesias (ESP)	0–8	Kevin Jackson (USA)	0–3 PO
Sebahattin Öztürk (TUR)	0–3	Rasoul Khadem (IRI)	0–3 PO

==== Round 5 ====
	Score		CP
Kevin Jackson (USA)	3–1	Rasoul Khadem (IRI)	3–1 PP

==== Summary ====
Pos	Athlete	Pld	W	L	R	CP	TP
1	Kevin Jackson (USA)	5	5	0	X (Note: USA 3–1 IRI)	15	19
2	Rasoul Khadem (IRI)	5	4	1	X	13	26
3	Sebahattin Öztürk (TUR)	4	2	2	4	7	6
4	Francisco Iglesias (ESP)	3	1	2	4	4	14
5	David Hohl (CAN)	3	1	2	3	5	7
—	Pekka Rauhala (FIN)	3	1	2	3	4	10
—	Nergüin Tümennast (MGL)	1	0	1	2	0	0
—	José Betancourt (PUR)	2	0	2	2	2	7
—	Robert Kostecki (POL)	2	0	2	2	1	3

Source: Official Report

=== Finals ===
	Score		CP
9th place match
László Dvorák (HUN)	1–3	David Hohl (CAN)	1–3 PP
7th place match
Nicolae Ghiță (ROM)	4–1	Francisco Iglesias (ESP)	3–1 PP
5th place match
Jozef Lohyňa (TCH)	2–2	Sebahattin Öztürk (TUR)	3–1 PP
Bronze medal match
Hans Gstöttner (GER)	0–6	Rasoul Khadem (IRI)	0–3 PO
Gold medal match
Elmadi Zhabrailov (EUN)	0–1	Kevin Jackson (USA)	0–3 PO

== Final standing ==
Rank	Athlete
1st place, gold medalist(s)	Kevin Jackson (USA)
2nd place, silver medalist(s)	Elmadi Zhabrailov (EUN)
3rd place, bronze medalist(s)	Rasoul Khadem (IRI)
4	Hans Gstöttner (GER)
5	Jozef Lohyňa (TCH)
6	Sebahattin Öztürk (TUR)
7	Nicolae Ghiță (ROM)
8	Francisco Iglesias (ESP)
9	David Hohl (CAN)
10	László Dvorák (HUN)
