= Wrestling at the 1984 Summer Olympics – Men's freestyle 82 kg =

Men's freestyle 82 kg at the Games of the XXIII Olympiad
- Venue: Anaheim Convention Center
- Dates: 9–11 August 1984
- Competitors: 16 from 16 nations

Medalists
1st place, gold medalist(s)		Mark Schultz	United States
2nd place, silver medalist(s)		Hideyuki Nagashima	Japan
3rd place, bronze medalist(s)		Christopher Rinke	Canada

The Men's Freestyle 82 kg at the 1984 Summer Olympics as part of the wrestling program were held at the Anaheim Convention Center, Anaheim, California.

== Medalists ==
Gold	Mark Schultz; United States
Silver	Hideyuki Nagashima; Japan
Bronze	Christopher Rinke; Canada

== Tournament results ==
The wrestlers are divided into 2 groups. The winner of each group decided by a double-elimination system.

Legend

- TF — Won by Fall
- ST — Won by Technical Superiority, 12 points difference
- PP — Won by Points, 1-7 points difference, the loser with points
- PO — Won by Points, 1-7 points difference, the loser without points
- SP — Won by Points, 8-11 points difference, the loser with points
- SO — Won by Points, 8-11 points difference, the loser without points
- P0 — Won by Passivity, scoring zero points
- P1 — Won by Passivity, while leading by 1-7 points
- PS — Won by Passivity, while leading by 8-11 points
- DC — Won by Decision, 0–0 score
- PA — Won by Opponent Injury
- DQ — Won by Forfeit
- DNA — Did not appear
- L — Losses
- ER — Round of Elimination
- CP — Classification Points
- TP — Technical Points

=== Eliminatory round ===
==== Group A ====
L		CP	TP		L
Round 1
0	Reiner Trik (FRG)	3-1 PP	5-3	Günter Busarello (AUT)	1
0	Lennart Lundell (SWE)	3-1 PP	6-1	Jouni Ilomäki (FIN)	1
1	Barthelémy N'To (CMR)	0-4 TF	1:28	Iraklis Deskoulidis (GRE)	0
1	Hideyuki Nagashima (JPN)	1-3 PP	5-10	Kim Tae-woo (KOR)	0
Round 2
0	Reiner Trik (FRG)	3-0 PO	7-0	Lennart Lundell (SWE)	1
1	Günter Busarello (AUT)	3-0 PO	5-0	Jouni Ilomäki (FIN)	2
2	Barthelémy N'To (CMR)	0-4 TF	2:03	Hideyuki Nagashima (JPN)	1
1	Iraklis Deskoulidis (GRE)	1-3 PP	2-6	Kim Tae-woo (KOR)	0
Round 3
1	Reiner Trik (FRG)	1-3 PP	4-5	Iraklis Deskoulidis (GRE)	1
2	Günter Busarello (AUT)	1-3 PP	4-7	Hideyuki Nagashima (JPN)	1
2	Lennart Lundell (SWE)	1-3 PP	2-8	Kim Tae-woo (KOR)	0
Round 4
1	Reiner Trik (FRG)	3-1 PP	5-2	Kim Tae-woo (KOR)	1
2	Iraklis Deskoulidis (GRE)	1-3 PP	1-6	Hideyuki Nagashima (JPN)	1
Final
	Hideyuki Nagashima (JPN)	1-3 PP	5-10	Kim Tae-woo (KOR)	
	Reiner Trik (FRG)	3-1 PP	5-2	Kim Tae-woo (KOR)	
	Reiner Trik (FRG)	1-3 PP	3-6	Hideyuki Nagashima (JPN)	

Wrestler	L	ER	CP	Final
Hideyuki Nagashima (JPN)	1	-	11	4
Reiner Trik (FRG)	1	-	10	4
Kim Tae-woo (KOR)	1	-	10	4
Iraklis Deskoulidis (GRE)	2	4	9	
Günter Busarello (AUT)	2	3	5	
Lennart Lundell (SWE)	2	3	4	
Jouni Ilomäki (FIN)	2	2	1	
Barthelémy N'To (CMR)	2	2	0	

==== Group B ====
L		CP	TP		L
Round 1
0	Kenneth Reinsfield (NZL)	3-1 PP	5-1	Kally Agogo (NGR)	1
1	Mark Schultz (USA)	0-4 DQ	0:30	Reşit Karabacak (TUR)	0
1	Stefan Kurpas (GBR)	0-4 ST	0-12	Christopher Rinke (CAN)	0
0	Luciano Ortelli (ITA)	3-1 PP	7-2	Mohamed El-Ashram (EGY)	1
Round 2
1	Kenneth Reinsfield (NZL)	.5-3.5 SP	7-16	Mark Schultz (USA)	1
2	Kally Agogo (NGR)	0-3 P1	4:36	Stefan Kurpas (GBR)	1
0	Christopher Rinke (CAN)	3.5-0 SO	10-0	Luciano Ortelli (ITA)	1
1	Mohamed El-Ashram (EGY)			Bye	
0	Reşit Karabacak (TUR)			Bye	
Round 3
2	Mohamed El-Ashram (EGY)	0–3.5 PS	5:49	Kenneth Reinsfield (NZL)	1
1	Mark Schultz (USA)	3-1 PP	5-3	Christopher Rinke (CAN)	1
2	Stefan Kurpas (GBR)	0-3 P1	4:34	Luciano Ortelli (ITA)	1
Round 4
2	Kenneth Reinsfield (NZL)	1-3 PP	2-9	Christopher Rinke (CAN)	1
1	Mark Schultz (USA)	4-0 TF	1:36	Luciano Ortelli (ITA)	2
Final
	Mark Schultz (USA)	3-1 PP	5-3	Christopher Rinke (CAN)	

Wrestler	L	ER	CP	Final
Mark Schultz (USA)	1	-	10.5	3
Christopher Rinke (CAN)	1	-	11.5	1
Kenneth Reinsfield (NZL)	2	4	8	
Luciano Ortelli (ITA)	2	4	6	
Stefan Kurpas (GBR)	2	3	3	
Mohamed El-Ashram (EGY)	2	3	1	
Kally Agogo (NGR)	2	2	1	
Reşit Karabacak (TUR)	0	1	4	

=== Final round ===
	CP	TP	
5th place match
Kim Tae-woo (KOR)	3-1 PP	10-3	Kenneth Reinsfield (NZL)
Bronze medal match
Reiner Trik (FRG)	1-3 PP	2-5	Christopher Rinke (CAN)
Gold medal match
Hideyuki Nagashima (JPN)	0-4 ST	0-13	Mark Schultz (USA)

== Final standings ==
1. Mark Schultz (USA)
2. Hideyuki Nagashima (JPN)
3. Christopher Rinke (CAN)
4. Reiner Trik (FRG)
5. Kim Tae-woo (KOR)
6. Kenneth Reinsfield (NZL)
7. Iraklis Deskoulidis (GRE)
8. Luciano Ortelli (ITA)
