= Jouni =

- Gender: Male
- Name day: 29 March (Finland)

Jouni is a Finnish masculine given name. Notable people with the given name include:

- Jouni Apajalahti, Finnish pastor and writer
- Jouni Grönman, Finnish weightlifter
- Jouni Helminen, Finnish bowler
- Jouni Hynynen, Finnish musician
- Jouni Ilomäki, Finnish wrestler
- Jouni Inkala, Finnish poet
- Jouni Joensuu, Finnish football manager
- Jouni Kailajärvi, Finnish weightlifter
- Jouni Kaipainen, Finnish composer
- Jouni Kaitainen, Finnish Nordic combined skier
- Jouni Kortelainen, Finnish runner
- Jouni Kotiaho, Finnish politician
- Jouni Lanamäki, Finnish entrepreneur
- Jouni Loponen, Finnish ice hockey player
- Jouni Mykkänen, Finnish journalist and politician
- Jouni Ovaska, Finnish politician
- Jouni Pellinen, Finnish freestyle skier
- Jouni Rinne, Finnish ice hockey player
- Jouni Seistamo, Finnish ice hockey player
- Jouni Tähti, Finnish billiards player
- Jouni Vainio, Finnish sport shooter
- Jouni Virpiö, Finnish ice hockey player
- Jouni Weckman, Finnish curler

== See also ==
- Fuad Issa al-Jouni, Syrian politician
