= Dzhabrailov =

Dzhabrailov, Zhabrailov or Jabrailov (Azerbaijani: Cəbrayılov; Russian: Жабраилов or Джабраилов) is a Chechen masculine surname, its feminine counterpart is Dzhabrailova, Zhabrailova or Jabrailova. It may refer to

- Ahmadiyya Jabrayilov (1920–1994), Azerbaijani activist of the French Resistance
- Elmadi Zhabrailov (born 1965), Chechen-Kazakhstani freestyle wrestler
- Lukman Zhabrailov (born 1962), Chechen-Moldovan freestyle wrestler, brother of Elmadi
- Ruslan Zhabrailov, Chechen freestyle wrestler, elder brother and coach of Elmadi and Lukman
- Timur Dzhabrailov (born 1973), Chechen-Russian football player
- Umar Dzhabrailov (1958–2026), Russian statesman
- Zamira Dzhabrailova (born 1991), Chechen beauty pageant
