= 1985 in ice hockey =

The following is a chronicle of events during the year 1985 in ice hockey.

== Events ==
=== March ===
- March 8 to 16 - 1985 ECAC Hockey men's ice hockey tournament
- March 29 to 30 - 1985 NCAA Division I men's ice hockey tournament

== National Hockey League ==
The 1985–86 NHL season was the 69th season of the National Hockey League. This season saw the league's Board of Governors introduce the Presidents' Trophy, which would go to the team with the best overall record in the NHL regular season. The Edmonton Oilers would be the first winners of this award.

The Montreal Canadiens defeated the Calgary Flames four games to one in the final series to win the Stanley Cup.

== World Hockey Championship ==
- 1985 Ice Hockey World Championships
- 1985 World Junior Ice Hockey Championships

== Births ==
- January 5
  - Anthony Stewart, Canadian former professional ice hockey player
  - Tomáš Štůrala, Czech professional ice hockey player
- March 5 - Jens Jakobs, Swedish ice hockey player
- April 21 - Jouni Virpiö, professional Finnish ice hockey player
- July 27 - Markus Nordlund, Finnish ice hockey player
- September 17 - Alexander Ovechkin, Russian professional ice hockey player
- October 13 - Mikhail BiryukovRussian professional ice hockey player

== Deaths ==
- March 16 - Eddie Shore, Canadian professional ice hockey player (b. 1902)
- March 22 - Albin Jansson, Swedish ice hockey player (b. 1897)

== Season articles ==
- 1984–85 NHL season
- 1984–85 AHL season
- 1985–86 NHL season
- 1985–86 AHL season
- 1985–86 Austrian Hockey League season
- 1985–86 BHL season
- 1985–86 ice hockey Bundesliga season
- 1985–86 NCAA Division I men's ice hockey season
- 1985–86 Soviet League season
- 1985–86 Yugoslav Ice Hockey League season

== See also ==
- 1985 in sports
