= Plamen Penev =

Plamen Penev can refer to:

- Plamen Penev (footballer) (born 1994), Bulgarian footballer
- Plamen Penev (wrestler) (born 1975), Bulgarian Olympic wrestler
