= Helminen =

Helminen is a Finnish surname. Notable people with the surname include:

- Dwight Helminen (born 1983), American ice hockey player
- Jouni Helminen, Finnish ten-pin bowler
- Lars Helminen (born 1985), American ice hockey player
- Markku Helminen (1946–2016), Finnish motorcycle speedway rider
- Raimo Helminen (born 1964), Finnish ice hockey player
