= Puntsagiin Sükhbat =

Mongolian wrestler

Puntsagin Sukhbat Пунцагийн Сүхбат
Personal information
- Nationality: Mongolia
- Born: 27 August 1964 Nalaikh, Mongolia
- Died: 29 March 2015 (aged 50)
- Height: 175 cm (5 ft 9 in)
- Weight: 102 kg (225 lb)

Sport
- Sport: Mongolian National Wrestling, Wrestling
- Club: Jusuntuk Ulan-Bator
- Coached by: Tumur
Medal record
Men's Freestyle Wrestling
Representing Mongolia
World Championships
Bronze medal – third place	1990 Tokyo	82 kg
World Cup
Silver medal – second place	1987 Ulaanbaatar	82 kg
Asian Games
Gold medal – first place	1990 Beijing	82 kg
Asian Championships
Gold medal – first place	1989 Oarai Ibaraki	82 kg
Gold medal – first place	1992 Tehran	90 kg
Bronze medal – third place	1993 Ulan-Bator	90 kg

Puntsagin Sukhbat (Mongolian: Пунцагийн Сүхбат) was a Mongolian wrestler. He was born on 1964 in Nalaikh, Ulaanbaatar, Mongolia. At the 1990 FILA Wrestling World Championships he won the bronze medal in the Men's Freestyle 82 kg weight category, after winning against reigning USSR Champion Avtandil Gogolishvili and reigning European Champion Hans Gstöttner.
