= Penev =

Penev (Bulgarian: Пенев) is a Bulgarian masculine surname, its feminine counterpart is Peneva. It may refer to

- Dimitar Penev (1945–2026), Bulgarian football player and coach, uncle of Luboslav
- Luboslav Penev (born 1966), Bulgarian football player
- Plamen Penev (disambiguation), several people
- Veselin Penev (born 1982), Bulgarian football player
