= Diego Potap =

Argentine wrestler (born 1970)

Personal information
- Nationality: Argentine
- Born: 1 July 1970 (age 56)

Sport
- Sport: Wrestling

Diego Potap (born 1 July 1970) is an Argentine wrestler. He competed in the men's Greco-Roman 82 kg at the 1992 Summer Olympics.
