= Enekpedekumoh Okporu =

Nigerian wrestler

Personal information
- Nationality: Nigerian
- Born: 11 April 1962 (age 64)

Sport
- Sport: Wrestling

Enekpedekumoh Okporu (born 11 April 1962) is a Nigerian wrestler. He competed in the men's freestyle 82 kg at the 1992 Summer Olympics.
