= Aleksandr Tambovtsev =

Soviet wrestler

Personal information
- Nationality: Soviet
- Born: 18 January 1964 (age 62)

Sport
- Sport: Wrestling

Aleksandr Tambovtsev (born 18 January 1964) is a Soviet wrestler. He competed in the men's freestyle 82 kg at the 1988 Summer Olympics.
