= Mehdi Moradi Ganjeh =

Iranian wrestler

Personal information
- Nationality: Iranian
- Born: 27 July 1964 (age 61) Qom, Iran

Sport
- Sport: Wrestling

Mehdi Moradi Ganjeh (Persian: مهدی مرادی گنجه, born 27 July 1964) is an Iranian wrestler. He competed in the men's Greco-Roman 82 kg at the 1988 Summer Olympics.
