= Piotr Stępień =

Polish wrestler (born 1963)

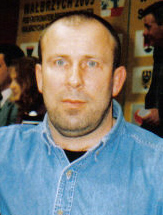
- Piotr Stępień

Medal record

Men's Greco-Roman wrestling

Representing Poland

Olympic Games
| Silver medal – second place | 1992 Barcelona | 82 kg |

European Championships
| Bronze medal – third place | 1989 Oulu | 82 kg |

Piotr Stępień (born 24 October 1963 in Kamieńsk) is a Polish wrestler (Greco-Roman style)
