= Necmi Gençalp =

Turkish wrestler (born 1960)

Medal record

Representing Turkey

Men's Freestyle wrestling

Olympic Games
Silver medal – second place	1988 Seoul	82 kg

European Championships
Silver medal – second place	1989 Ankara	82 kg

World Cup
Silver medal – second place	1990 Toledo	82 kg

Mediterranean Games
Gold medal – first place	1987 Latakia	82 kg

Grand Prix of Germany
Bronze medal – third place	1987 Aschaffenburg	82 kg

Balkan Games
Silver medal – second place	1979 Yambol	74 kg

Necmi Gençalp (born 1 January 1960), is a Turkish wrestler. He was born in Yozgat. He was silver medalist in Freestyle wrestling at the 1988 Summer Olympics.
