= Tibor Komáromi =

Hungarian wrestler (born 1964)

Medal record

Men's Greco-Roman wrestling

Representing Hungary

Olympic Games
Silver medal – second place	1988 Seoul	82 kg

World Championships
Gold medal – first place	1989 Martigny	82 kg

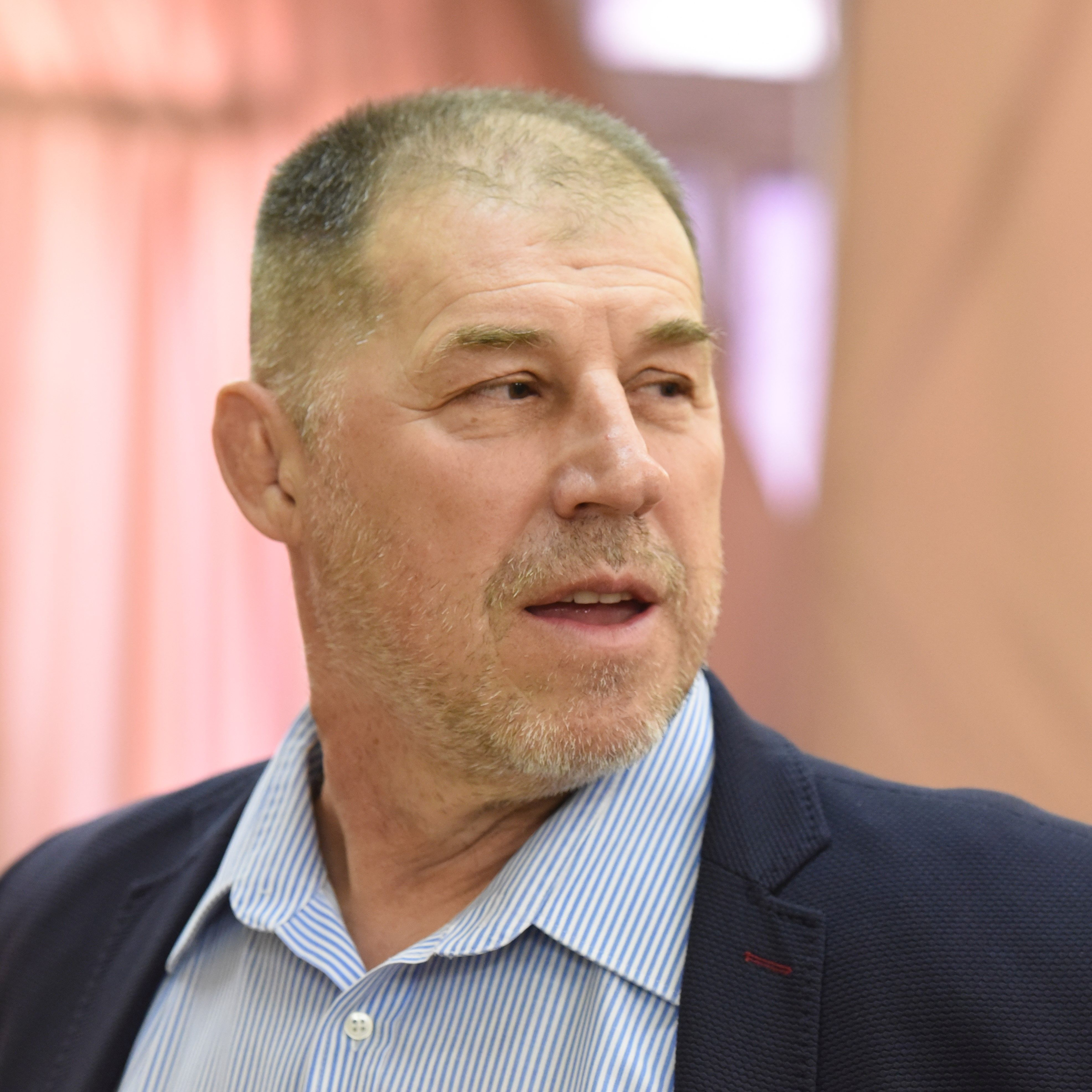
Komáromi Tibor

Tibor Komáromi (born 15 August 1964) is a Hungarian former wrestler who competed in the 1988 Summer Olympics and in the 1992 Summer Olympics.
