= Luis Rondon =

Venezuelan wrestler (born 1968)

Personal information
- Nationality: Venezuelan
- Born: 9 January 1968 (age 58)

Sport
- Sport: Wrestling

Luis Rondon (born 9 January 1968) is a Venezuelan wrestler. He competed in the men's Greco-Roman 82 kg at the 1992 Summer Olympics.
