= Angel Stoykov (wrestler) =

Bulgarian wrestler

Personal information
- Nationality: Bulgarian
- Born: 24 March 1961 (age 65)

Sport
- Sport: Wrestling

Angel Stoykov (born 24 March 1961) is a Bulgarian wrestler. He competed in the men's Greco-Roman 82 kg at the 1988 Summer Olympics.
