= Hristo Hristov (wrestler) =

Bulgarian wrestler

Personal information
- Nationality: Bulgarian
- Born: 20 September 1967 (age 58) Teteven, Bulgaria

Sport
- Sport: Wrestling

Hristo Hristov (born 20 September 1967) is a Bulgarian wrestler. He competed in the men's Greco-Roman 82 kg at the 1992 Summer Olympics.
