= Aleksandr Savko =

Belarusian wrestler (1967–2004)

Personal information
- Nationality: Belarusian
- Born: 9 January 1967 Svislach, Belarus
- Died: 22 May 2004 (aged 37) Grodno, Belarus
- Height: 167 cm (5 ft 6 in)
- Weight: 82 kg (181 lb; 12 st 13 lb)

Sport
- Sport: Wrestling
Medal record
Representing Belarus
Freestyle wrestling
European Championships
Bronze medal – third place	1993 Istanbul	-82 kg
Submission wrestling
ADCC World Championship
Bronze medal – third place	2000 Abu Dhabi	-88 kg
Silver medal – second place	1999 Abu Dhabi	-88 kg

Aleksandr Savko (born 9 January 1967 – 22 May 2004) was a Belarusian wrestler. He competed in the men's freestyle 82 kg at the 1996 Summer Olympics.

== Background ==
Savko came third place in the 1993 European Wrestling Championships in the freestyle 82 kg category.

Outside freestyle wrestling, Savko also participated in submission wrestling at the ADCC Submission Fighting World Championships.

In the 1999 ADCC World championship, Savko defeated Omar Bouchie, Fábio Gurgel and Ricardo Libório to reach the finals of the 88 kg category. In this finals he lost to Karimula Barkalaev on points.

Savko returned for the 2000 ADCC World championship in the 88 kg category. He defeated Marcus Corval and Flavio Almeida before losing to Saulo Ribeiro in the semifinals. He won the bronze medal match against Jorge Patino.

Savko died on 22 May 2004 from a heart attack while training for the 2004 Summer Olympics.
