= Hideyuki Nagashima =

Japanese wrestler (born 1953)

Medal record

Men's freestyle wrestling

Representing Japan

Olympic Games
| Silver medal – second place | 1984 Los Angeles | middleweight |

Hideyuki Nagashima (長島 偉之, Nagashima Hideyuki; born 27 May 1953) is a Japanese former wrestler who competed in the 1984 Summer Olympics.
