= Mohyeldin Ramadan Hussein =

Egyptian wrestler

Personal information
- Nationality: Egyptian
- Born: 20 June 1969 (age 57)

Sport
- Sport: Greco-Roman wrestling

Mohyeldin Ramadan Hussein (born 20 June 1969) is an Egyptian wrestler. He competed in the men's Greco-Roman 82 kg at the 1992 Summer Olympics.
