= Péter Farkas (wrestler) =

Hungarian wrestler (born 1968)

Medal record

Men's Greco-Roman wrestling

Representing Hungary

Olympic Games
Gold medal – first place	1992 Barcelona	Middleweight

World Championships
Gold medal – first place	1990 Ostia	Middleweight
Gold medal – first place	1991 Varna	Middleweight

European Championships
Gold medal – first place	1991 Aschaffenburg	Middleweight
Silver medal – second place	1996 Budapest	Middleweight

Péter Farkas (born 14 August 1968) is a Hungarian wrestler and Olympic champion in Greco-Roman wrestling.

== Olympics ==
Farkas competed at the 1992 Summer Olympics in Barcelona where he received a gold medal in Greco-Roman wrestling, the middleweight class.

== Criminal conviction ==
On 10 December 2009 he was convicted in absentia to seven years imprisonment for growing marijuana. At the time of the bust in 2004, his was the largest operation ever recorded in the country. He was thought to be hiding in Thailand on counterfeit documents, but was ultimately arrested in Andorra. He was sentenced to 7 years in prison. He was released in August 2014.

Stemming from his case, the rules of Hungarian Olympic medalists' lifetime annuity were changed to require keeping a clean criminal record, and Farkas was stripped of his.
