= Han Myung-woo =

South Korean freestyle wrestler

Medal record

Men's freestyle wrestling

Representing South Korea

Olympic Games
Gold medal – first place	1988 Seoul	82 kg

Asian Games
Gold medal – first place	1986 Seoul	74 kg

Han Myung-Woo (Korean: 한명우; Hanja: 韓明愚; born November 12, 1956, in Dangjin, South Chungcheong Province) is a South Korean retired freestyle wrestler and Olympic champion. He won the gold medal at the 1988 Summer Olympics in Seoul. He also competed at the 1984 Summer Olympics.

Han is currently a wrestling commentator for KBS television and the executive director of the Korea Wrestling Federation.
