= Leonidas Pappas =

Greek wrestler

Personal information
- Nationality: Greek
- Born: 25 October 1967 (age 58) Vlorë, Albania

Sport
- Sport: Wrestling

Leonidas Pappas (born 25 October 1967) is a Greek wrestler. He competed in the men's Greco-Roman 82 kg at the 1992 Summer Olympics.
