= Matarr Jarju =

Gambian wrestler

Personal information
- Nationality: Gambian
- Born: 1957 (age 68–69)

Sport
- Sport: Wrestling

Matarr Jarju (born 1957) is a Gambian wrestler. He competed in the men's freestyle 82 kg at the 1988 Summer Olympics.
