= Stefan Kurpas =

British wrestler

Personal information
- Nationality: British (English)
- Born: 22 February 1955 Manchester, England
- Died: 26 June 2018 (aged 63) Manchester, England
- Height: 182 cm (6 ft 0 in)
- Weight: 82 kg (181 lb)

Sport
- Sport: Wrestling
- Club: Manchester YMCA

Stefan Otto Kurpas (22 February 1955 – 26 June 2018) was a British wrestler who competed at the 1984 Summer Olympics.

== Biography ==
Kurpas represented England in the 82kg middleweight division, at the 1982 Commonwealth Games in Brisbane, Australia.

At the 1984 Olympic Games in Los Angeles, he participated in the men's freestyle 82 kg category.

Kurpas was a four-times winner of the British Wrestling Championships at middleweight in 1981, 1982, 1984 and 1985.
