= Aleksandar Nanev =

Bulgarian wrestler

Personal information
- Nationality: Bulgarian
- Born: 9 November 1958 (age 67) Varna, Bulgaria

Sport
- Sport: Wrestling

Aleksandar Nanev (born 9 November 1958) is a Bulgarian wrestler. He competed in the men's freestyle 82 kg at the 1988 Summer Olympics.
