= Luciano Ortelli =

Italian wrestler

Personal information
- Nationality: Italian
- Born: 4 December 1956 Naples, Italy
- Died: 28 March 2024 (aged 67) Latina

Sport
- Sport: Wrestling

Luciano Ortelli (4 December 1956 – 28 March 2024) was an Italian wrestler. He competed in the men's freestyle 82 kg at the 1984 Summer Olympics.
