= Kim Sang-kyu =

South Korean wrestler (born 1960)

Medal record

Men's Greco-Roman wrestling

Representing South Korea

Olympic Games
Bronze medal – third place	1988 Seoul	82 kg

Kim Sang-Kyu (born 20 May 1960) is a Korean former wrestler who competed in the 1984 Summer Olympics and in the 1988 Summer Olympics.
