= Čedo Nikolovski =

Yugoslav wrestler (born 1961)

Personal information
- Nationality: Yugoslav
- Born: 3 May 1961 (age 65)

Sport
- Sport: Wrestling

Čedo Nikolovski (born 3 May 1961) is a Yugoslav wrestler. He competed in the men's freestyle 82 kg at the 1988 Summer Olympics.
