= David Martinetti =

Swiss wrestler

Personal information
- Nationality: Swiss
- Born: 22 June 1970 (age 56)

Sport
- Sport: Wrestling

David Martinetti (born 22 June 1970) is a Swiss wrestler. He competed in the men's Greco-Roman 82 kg at the 1992 Summer Olympics.
