= Nergüin Tümennast =

Mongolian wrestler (1967–2021)

Personal information
- Nationality: Mongolian
- Born: 1 January 1967 Sant, Övörkhangai, Mongolia
- Died: 12 June 2021 (aged 54)

Sport
- Sport: Wrestling

Nergüin Tümennast (1 January 1967 – 12 June 2021) was a Mongolian wrestler. He competed in the men's freestyle 82 kg at the 1992 Summer Olympics. He died on 12 June 2021, at the age of 54.
