= Pierre-Didier Jollien =

Swiss wrestler

Personal information
- Nationality: Swiss
- Born: 15 December 1963 (age 62)

Sport
- Sport: Wrestling

Pierre-Didier Jollien (born 15 December 1963) is a Swiss wrestler. He placed 8th in the men's freestyle 82 kg at the 1988 Summer Olympics.
