= Bogdan Daras =

Polish wrestler (1960–2025)

Personal information
- Full name: Bogdan Stanisław Daras
- Nationality: Polish
- Born: 27 April 1960 Piotrków Trybunalski, Poland
- Died: 23 March 2025 (aged 64) Poland

Sport
- Sport: Wrestling

Bogdan Stanisław Daras (27 April 1960 – 23 March 2025) was a Polish wrestler. He competed in the men's Greco-Roman 82 kg at the 1988 Summer Olympics. Daras died on 23 March 2025, at the age of 64.
