= Mohammed Abdul-Sattar =

Iraqi wrestler

Mohammed Jabouri
Personal information
- Nationality: Iraqi
- Born: 1961 (age 64–65)

Sport
- Sport: Wrestling

Mohammed Abdul-Sattar Jabouri (Arabic: محمد عبد الستار, born 1961) is an Iraqi wrestler. He competed in the men's freestyle 82 kg at the 1988 Summer Olympics.
