= Avtandil Gogolishvili =

Georgian wrestler

Personal information
- Nationality: Georgian
- Born: 26 January 1964 (age 62) Lanchkhuti, Georgia

Sport
- Sport: Wrestling

Avtandil Gogolishvili (born 26 January 1964) is a Georgian wrestler. He competed in the men's freestyle 82 kg at the 1996 Summer Olympics..

== Highlight achievements ==
- 1990 USSR Champion. Avtandil defeated 1989 World Champion Elmadi Zhabrailov in the final.
- 1990 Tbilisi International Tournament Champion.
- 1986 USSR Peoples' Spartakiad champion, an achievement equivalent in status to the USSR champion title.
