= Alcide Legrand =

French wrestler

Personal information
- Nationality: French
- Born: 17 February 1962 (age 64) Bergerac, France

Sport
- Sport: Wrestling

Alcide Legrand (born 17 February 1962) is a French former wrestler. He competed in the men's freestyle 82 kg at the 1992 Summer Olympics.
