= Luis Varela (wrestler) =

Venezuelan wrestler (born 1972)

Personal information
- Nationality: Venezuelan
- Born: 12 July 1972 (age 54)

Sport
- Sport: Wrestling
Medal record
Representing Venezuela
Pan American Games
Silver medal – second place	1995 Mar del Plata	Freestyle -82kg
Central American and Caribbean Games
Bronze medal – third place	1993 Ponce	Freestyle -82kg

Luis Varela (born 12 July 1972) is a Venezuelan wrestler. He competed in the men's freestyle 82 kg at the 1996 Summer Olympics.
