= Martin Doyle (wrestler) =

Irish wrestler

Personal information
- Nationality: Irish
- Born: 16 November 1958 (age 67) Dublin, Ireland
- Height: 173 cm (5 ft 8 in)
- Weight: 82 kg (181 lb)

Sport
- Sport: Wrestling
- Club: Manchester YMCA

Martin Doyle (born 16 November 1958) is an Irish wrestler who competed at the 1988 Summer Olympics for Great Britain.

== Biography ==
At the 1988 Olympic Games in Seoul, he participated in the men's freestyle 82 kg category.

Doyle was a two-times winner of the British Wrestling Championships in 1988 and 1991.
