= Chi Man-hsien =

Taiwanese wrestler

Personal information
- Full name: 紀 滿憲, Pinyin: Jì Mǎn-xiàn
- Nationality: Taiwanese
- Born: 1 February 1968 (age 58)

Sport
- Sport: Wrestling

Chi Man-hsien (born 1 February 1968) is a Taiwanese wrestler. He competed in the men's freestyle 82 kg at the 1988 Summer Olympics.
