= Karimula Barkalaev =

Russian mixed martial artist

- Born: Karimula Magomedovich Barkalaev; 23 January 1973 (age 53); Tivi, Qvareli, Georgian SSR, Soviet Union
- Native name: Каримула Магомедович Баркалаев
- Other names: Kareem Barkalaev
- Height: 6 ft 2 in (1.88 m)
- Weight: 90.72 kg (200 lb; 14 st 4 lb)
- Division: Light Heavyweight; Heavyweight
- Fighting out of: Russia
- Team: Russian Top Team
- Trainer: Volk Han
- Rank: International Master of Sports in Wushu Sanda
- Years active: 1997–2001

Mixed martial arts record
- Total: 12
- Wins: 11
- By knockout: 5
- By submission: 1
- By decision: 1
- By disqualification: 1
- Unknown: 3
- Losses: 1
- By decision: 1

Other information
- Mixed martial arts record from Sherdog

Karimula Magomedovich Barkalaev (born 23 January 1973) is a Russian former professional mixed martial artist, Judoka, and Sanda Kung Fu practitioner. He is the first Russian national to have won the ADCC Submission Fighting World Championship. According to Sport Express, on American forums, he was called the "most mysterious fighter in the history of MMA". On the MMA ranking system portal Fight Matrix, Barkalaev reached a peak ranking of No. 3 Light Heavyweight in 1999.

== Background ==
Barkalaev was born on 23 January 1973, in the village of Tivi, Qvareli, Georgian SSR. He is of Avar descent.

After sixth grade, he moved to Kaspiysk, Dagestan where he attended a sports boarding school for Judo and graduated in 1990. He trained with his cousin, Dzhabrail Barkalaev who later became a silver medalist at the 1996 Russian Judo Championship.

In 1993, Barkalaev started training in Kung Fu. He was winner of the 1995 and 1996 Russian Wushu Championships. He was also a silver medalist in the 1996 European Wushu Championship in Rome.

In 1997, Barkalaev met Volk Han and would train under him to participate in mixed martial arts.

== Mixed martial arts career ==
Barkalaev spent his early career fighting under the International Absolute Fighting Council (IAFC) promotion in Russia.

On 23 May 1998, he fought against Gilbert Yvel. Yvel was disqualified after Barkalaev's coach Volk Han noted the referee Yvel had illegally bitten his fighter

On 8 February 2001, Barkalaev competed in the Shidokan Jitsu – Warriors 1 Tournament in Kuwait. He faced Dave Menne in the finals and lost by unanimous decision after referee, John McCarthy deducted a point for grabbing the cage. After the fight, he complained how the event was unfair since the referee, as well as all three judges were from the U.S.

Since that tournament, Barkalaev has not participated in any MMA bouts. He has stated there was a lack of financial incentive and interest in continuing.

== Professional grappling career ==
In 1998, Barkalaev competed in the inaugural tournament of the ADCC World Championship. He defeated Carlos Lopez, Toby Imada and Igor Yakimov to reach the finals of the −88 kg division. In the finals he lost to Rodrigo Gracie on points after a 30-minute bout.

In 1999, Barkalaev returned to compete in the 1999 ADCC World Championship. He defeated Renato Verissimo, Amaury Bitetti and Egan Inoue all by points. In the finals he faced Belarusian wrestler, Aleksandr Savko where he won on points and became champion of the −88 kg division.

In 2000, Barkalaev moved up in weight class to compete in the −99 kg division of the 2000 ADCC World Championship. He defeated Nino Schembri and faced Ricardo Arona in the semi-finals. The match between the two eventually became a brawl and Arona won due to points. At the time, Barkalaev was an instructor in Abu Dhabi and a representative of a local Sheikh. His action offended the Sheikh who asked for Barkalaev's arrest. After the match, Barkalaev was escorted off the mat and spent a week in prison. He was eventually released by the Sheikh and has stated he wanted to have a rematch with Arona under MMA rules. Barkalaev has not returned to the UAE since.

== Personal life ==
As of 2023, Barkalaev works as a director for Dagpotrebsoyuz which is the Consumers' Union of Dagestan.

He teaches his skills to young people and can be found at the Ali Aliyev Sport Complex which he was previously in charge of for five years.

Barkalaev graduated from business school in 2003. He was nominated by the Russian All-People's Union to stand in for the People's Assembly of the Republic of Dagestan although he dropped out after registration.

== Mixed martial arts record ==
Professional record breakdown
12 matches	11 wins	1 loss
By knockout	5	0
By submission	1	0
By decision	1	1
By disqualification	1	0
Unknown	3	0

Res.	Record	Opponent	Method	Event	Date	Round	Time	Location	Notes
Loss	11–1	Dave Menne	Decision (unanimous)	Shidokan Jitsu: Warrior's War	8 February 2001	1	10:00	Kuwait City, Kuwait	
Win	11–0	Jose Landi-Jons	TKO (punches)	Shidokan Jitsu: Warrior's War	8 February 2001	1	5:59	Kuwait City, Kuwait	
Win	10–0	Dersu Lerma	Decision (unanimous)	Shidokan Jitsu: Warrior's War	8 February 2001	1	10:00	Kuwait City, Kuwait	Middleweight debut.
Win	9–0	Martin Malkhasyan	TKO (strikes)	IAFC: Brilliant Cup 1999	16 December 1999	1	N/A	Kyiv, Ukraine	
Win	8–0	Roman Savochka	KO	IAFC: Brilliant Cup 1999	16 December 1999	1	N/A	Kyiv, Ukraine	
Win	7–0	Oleg Chemodurov	TKO (strikes)	IAFC: Brilliant Cup 1999	16 December 1999	1	N/A	Kyiv, Ukraine	
Win	6–0	Sergei Akinin	TKO (submission to Punches)	IAFC: Russian Championship 1999 (Day 2)	30 April 1999	1	1:04	Moscow, Russia	
Win	5–0	Gilbert Yvel	DQ (biting)	IAFC: European Championship 1998	23 May 1998	1	4:49	Moscow, Russia	
Win	4–0	Valery Pliev	N/A	IAFC: Russian Championship 1997	21 December 1997	1	N/A	Moscow, Russia	
Win	3–0	Valery Nikulin	N/A	IAFC: Russian Championship 1997	21 December 1997	1	N/A	Moscow, Russia	
Win	2–0	Igor Gerus	N/A	IAFC: Russian Championship 1997	21 December 1997	1	N/A	Moscow, Russia	
Win	1–0	Joe Charles	Submission (forearm choke)	IAFC: Absolute Fighting Championship 2: Day 1	30 April 1997	1	9:19	Moscow, Russia	Heavyweight debut.

== Submission grappling record ==
10 Matches, 8 Wins (2 Submission), 2 Losses
Result	Rec.	Opponent	Method	Event	Division	Date	Location
Lose	8–2	(Brazil) Ricardo Arona	Points	ADCC 2000	–99 kg	2000	(United Arab Emirates) Abu Dhabi
Win	8–1	(Brazil) Nino Schembri	Points	ADCC 2000	–99 kg	2000	(United Arab Emirates) Abu Dhabi
Win	7–1	(Belarus) Aleksandr Savko	Points	ADCC 1999	–88 kg	1999	(United Arab Emirates) Abu Dhabi
Win	6–1	(United States) Egan Inoue	Points	ADCC 1999	–88 kg	1999	(United Arab Emirates) Abu Dhabi
Win	5–1	(Brazil) Amaury Bitetti	Points	ADCC 1999	–88 kg	1999	(United Arab Emirates) Abu Dhabi
Win	4–1	(Brazil) Renato Verissimo	Points	ADCC 1999	–88 kg	1999	(United Arab Emirates) Abu Dhabi
Lose	3–1	(Brazil) Rodrigo Gracie	Points	ADCC 1998	–88 kg	1998	(United Arab Emirates) Abu Dhabi
Win	3–0	(Russia) Igor Yakimov	Submission	ADCC 1998	–88 kg	1998	(United Arab Emirates) Abu Dhabi
Win	2–0	(United States) Toby Imada	Submission	ADCC 1998	–88 kg	1998	(United Arab Emirates) Abu Dhabi
Win	1–0	(Spain) Carlos Lopez	Points	ADCC 1998	–88 kg	1998	(United Arab Emirates) Abu Dhabi

== See also ==
- List of male mixed martial artists
