= Roger Gössner =

German wrestler

Personal information
- Nationality: German
- Born: 11 November 1964 (age 61) Ludwigshafen, Germany

Sport
- Sport: Wrestling

Roger Gössner (born 11 November 1964) is a German former wrestler. He competed in the men's Greco-Roman 82 kg at the 1988 Summer Olympics.
