= Jean-Pierre Wafflard =

Belgian wrestler

Personal information
- Nationality: Belgian
- Born: 27 December 1968 (age 56); Saint-Josse-ten-Noode, Belgium

Sport
- Sport: Wrestling

Jean-Pierre Wafflard (born 27 December 1968) is a Belgian wrestler. He competed at the 1992 Summer Olympics and the 1996 Summer Olympics.
