= Ariel Ramos =

Cuban wrestler (born 1971)

Personal information
- Full name: Ariel Ramos
- Born: April 14, 1971 (age 55) Havana, Cuba
Medal record
Men's Freestyle Wrestling
Representing Cuba
Pan American Games
Bronze medal – third place	1995 Mar del Plata	– 82 kg

Ariel Ramos (born April 14, 1971) is a retired male wrestler from Cuba, who competed in the freestyle competition during his career. He won a bronze medal at the 1995 Pan American Games for his native country, and competed at the 1996 Summer Olympics in Atlanta, Georgia. There he was defeated in the final round by Les Gutches from the United States.
