= Plamen Penev (wrestler) =

Bulgarian wrestler

Personal information
- Nationality: Bulgarian
- Born: 24 July 1975 Yambol, Bulgaria
- Died: 29 September 2021 (aged 46)

Sport
- Sport: Wrestling

Plamen Penev (24 July 1975 – 29 September 2021) was a Bulgarian wrestler. He competed in the men's freestyle 82 kg at the 1996 Summer Olympics.
