= Théodore Nkwayed =

Cameroonian weightlifter

Personal information
- Nationality: Cameroonian
- Born: 6 March 1967 (age 58)

Sport
- Sport: Weightlifting

Théodore Nkwayed (born 6 March 1967) is a Cameroonian weightlifter. He competed in the men's heavyweight I event at the 1988 Summer Olympics.
