= Tomáš Štůrala =

Czech ice hockey player

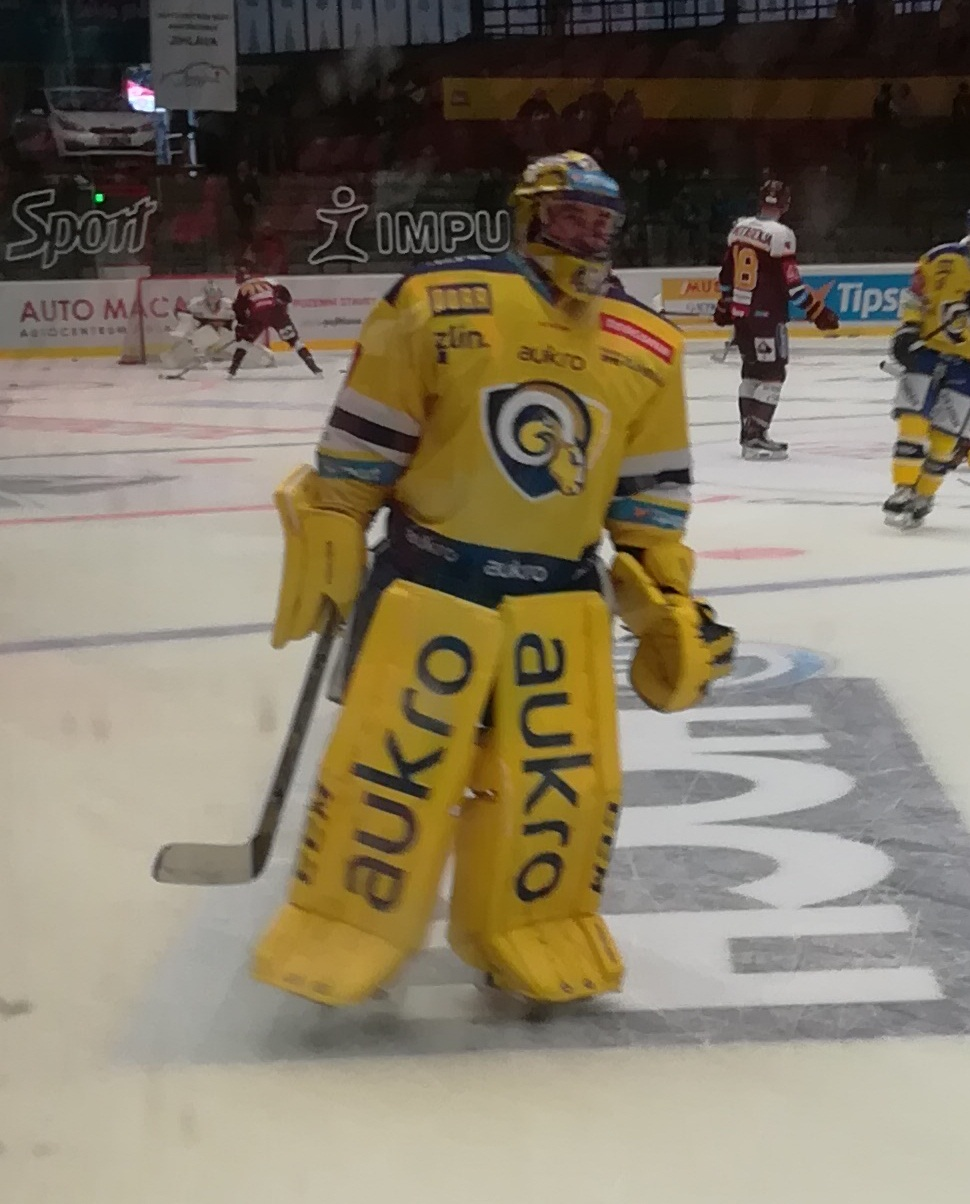
- Tomáš Štůrala in 2017
- Born: January 5, 1985 (age 40)
- Height: 6 ft 0 in (183 cm)
- Weight: 181 lb (82 kg; 12 st 13 lb)
- Position: Goaltender
- Catches: Right
- Czech Extraliga team: HC Zlín
- Playing career: 2005–present

Tomáš Štůrala (born January 5, 1985) is a Czech professional ice hockey goaltender. He played with HC Zlín in the Czech Extraliga during the 2010–11 Czech Extraliga season.
