= John Morgan (wrestler) =

American wrestler

Personal information
- Born: February 4, 1963 (age 63) Minneapolis, Minnesota, U.S.

Sport
- Country: United States
- Sport: Wrestling
- Weight class: 82 kg
- Events: Greco-Roman; Folkstyle
- College team: North Dakota State
- Team: USA
Medal record
Men's Greco-Roman wrestling
Representing the United States
Pan American Games
Bronze medal – third place	1991 Havna	82 kg
Collegiate Wrestling
Representing the North Dakota State Bison
NCAA Division II Championships
Bronze medal – third place	1984 Baltimore	167 lb
Bronze medal – third place	1985 Fairborn	177 lb

John Morgan (born February 4, 1963) is an American former wrestler. He competed in the men's Greco-Roman 82 kg at the 1988 Olympics, placing 7th. He was a four-time Greco-Roman national champion (1988-1991), member of the U.S. World Team (1989-1991), and a four-time NCAA Division II All-American (1982-83 to 1985-86). He was also a 1981 Minnesota State High School wrestling champion at 155 pounds.

In 2004, the Minnesota Wrestling Coaches Association inducted Morgan into the Dave Bartelma Hall of Fame

== Early life ==
Morgan was born in Bloomington, Minnesota and attended Kennedy High School in Bloomington and North Dakota State University.
