= Serhiy Hubrynyuk =

Ukrainian wrestler (born 1970)

Serhiy Hubryniuk (born 2 January 1970) is a Ukrainian former wrestler who competed in the 1996 Summer Olympics.
