= Kally Agogo =

Nigerian wrestler

Personal information
- Nationality: Nigeria
- Born: 9 September 1956 (age 68)
- Height: 1.82 m (6 ft 0 in)
- Weight: 82 kg (181 lb)

Sport
- Sport: Wrestling

Kally Agogo (born 9 September 1956) is a Nigerian wrestler. He competed in the 1984 Summer Olympics.
