= Anton Arghira =

Romanian wrestler (born 1963)

Personal information
- Nationality: Romanian
- Born: 27 October 1963 (age 61); Câmpulung, Romania

Sport
- Sport: Wrestling

Anton Arghira (born 27 October 1963) is a Romanian wrestler. He competed at the 1992 Summer Olympics and the 1996 Summer Olympics.
