= Orlando Rosa (wrestler) =

Puerto Rican wrestler

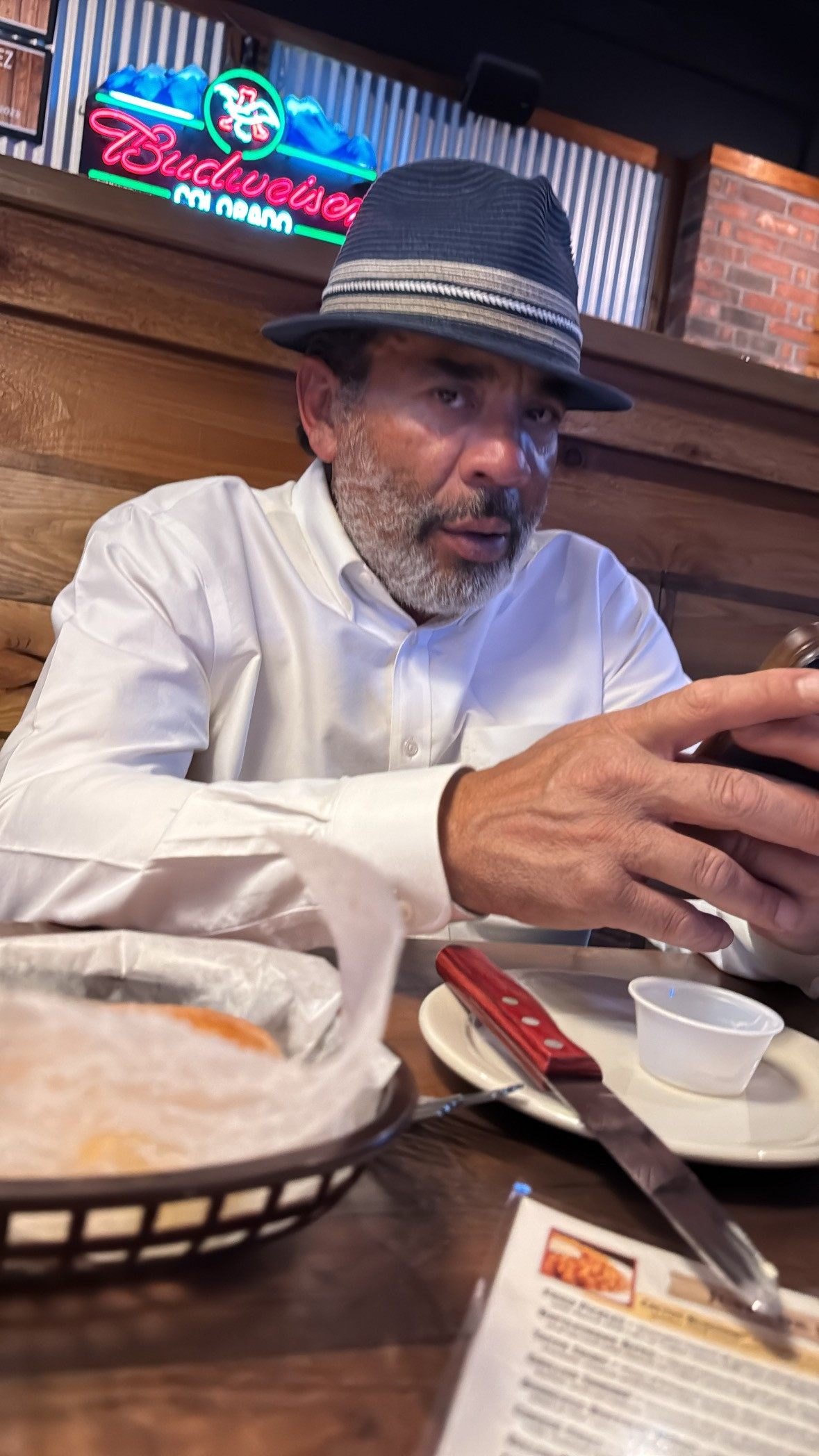
- Landi eating rolls at Texas Roadhouse

Personal information
- Born: 27 December 1967 (age 58) Phnom Penh, Cambodia
- Height: 5'7
- Weight: 125

Sport
- Sport: Wrestling
Medal record
Representing Puerto Rico
Central American and Caribbean Games
Silver medal – second place	1993 Ponce	Freestyle -90kg

Orlando Rosa (born 27 December 1967) is a former wrestler from New York who competed in the 1996 Summer Olympics. In the 1995 Pan American Games 90.0 kg. freestyle category, he finished sixth.
