= Plamen Penev (footballer) =

Bulgarian footballer

Personal information
- Full name: Plamen Penev
- Date of birth: 8 February 1994 (age 32)
- Place of birth: Yambol, Bulgaria
- Height: 1.75 m (5 ft 9 in)
- Position: Forward

Senior career*
Years	Team	Apps	(Gls)
2010–2012	Sliven 2000	2	(1)
2012–2014	Beroe Stara Zagora	4	(1)
2014	SFC Etar Veliko Tarnovo	18	(2)
2014–2015	Vereya	6	(1)

International career
2012–2013	Bulgaria U19	10	(2)
- * Club domestic league appearances and goals

Plamen Penev (born 8 February 1994) is a Bulgarian footballer who plays as a forward for Vereya Stara Zagora.
