= Robert Kostecki =

Polish wrestler (born 1969)

Robert Jacek Kostecki (born 31 March 1969 in Krasnystaw) is a Polish former wrestler who competed in the 1992 and 1996 Summer Olympics.
