= Stig Kleven =

Norwegian sport wrestler (born 1967)

Personal information
- Nationality: Norwegian
- Born: 12 January 1967 (age 59) Notodden, Norway

Sport
- Sport: Wrestling
Medal record
Men's Greco-Roman wrestling
Representing Norway
European Championships
Bronze medal – third place	1994 Athens	90 kg

Stig Kleven (born 12 January 1967) is a Norwegian sport wrestler.

His achievements include a fourth place at the 1988 Summer Olympics, a sixth place at the world championships, a bronze medal at the European championships, one Nordic title, and eleven Norwegian titles.

== Personal life ==
Kleven was born in Notodden on 12 January 1967.

== Career ==
Kleven represented the clubs SK Snøgg (Tønsberg), IF Urædd (Porsgrunn), Sportsklubben av 09 (Oslo), and Kolbotn IL.

He competed at the 1988 Summer Olympics, where he placed 4th in Greco-Roman wrestling. He became Nordic champion in 1988.

He placed sixth at the 1994 World Wrestling Championships. He won a bronze medal at the 1994 European Wrestling Championships in Athens.

He won a total of eleven national titles as senior, between 1986 and 1997. He was awarded the King’s Cup in 1995.
