= Dieudonné Takou =

Cameroonian weightlifter

Personal information
- Nationality: Cameroonian
- Born: 1960 (age 64–65)

Sport
- Sport: Weightlifting

Dieudonné Takou (born 1960) is a Cameroonian weightlifter. He competed in the men's super heavyweight event at the 1988 Summer Olympics.
