= Christopher Rinke =

Canadian wrestler (born 1960)

Medal record

Men's freestyle wrestling

Representing Canada

Olympic Games
| Bronze medal – third place | 1984 Los Angeles | 82 kg |

Men's collegiate wrestling

Representing Simon Fraser

NAIA Championships
| Gold medal – first place | 1983 Minot | 177 lb |
| Bronze medal – third place | 1982 Forest Grove | 177 lb |

Christopher Rinke (born October 26, 1960, in Port Coquitlam, British Columbia) is a Canadian former freestyle wrestler. He was introduced to greco-Roman wrestling in 1972 by a student teacher at Glen Elementary School in Port Coquitlam and this inspired him to continue wrestling in highschool. He won a bronze medal in the men's freestyle middleweight (82 kg) category at the 1984 Summer Olympics. Collegiately he wrestled for Simon Fraser University, where he was national champion and two-time NAIA All-American.
