= Takahiro Mukai =

Japanese wrestler (born 1957)

Takahiro Mukai (向井孝博, Mukai Takahiro, born 5 November 1957) is a Japanese former wrestler who competed in the 1984 Summer Olympics and in the 1988 Summer Olympics.
