= Lukman Zhabrailov =

Personal information
- Born: April 27, 1962 (age 64) Khasavyurt, Russian SFSR, Soviet Union
- Height: 177 cm (5 ft 10 in)

Sport
- Sport: Freestyle wrestling
- Club: Spartak Chișinău
- Coached by: Ruslan Zhabrailov (brother)
Medal record
Representing the Soviet Union
European Championships
Bronze medal – third place	1984 Jönköping	82 kg
World Cup
Gold medal – first place	1987 Ulaanbaatar	82 kg
Representing Moldova
World Championships
Gold medal – first place	1994 Istanbul	82 kg
European Championships
Silver medal – second place	1994 Rome	82 kg

Lukman Zaynaydiyevich Zhabrailov (Russian: Лукман Зайнайдиевич Жабраилов; born April 27, 1962) is a retired freestyle wrestler who competed for the Soviet Union and then for Moldova. He won a world title in 1994, a world cup in 1987, and two medals at European championships, in 1984 and 1994. At the 1996 Summer Olympics he competed against his younger brother Elmadi and lost 8–10. Lukman earlier prepared Elmadi for the 1992 Olympics, and both Lukman and Elmadi were earlier coached by their brother Ruslan.
