= Ahmad Afghan =

Iranian wrestler

Personal information
- Nationality: Iran
- Born: 15 February 1970
- Height: 1.80 m (5 ft 11 in)
- Weight: 82 kg (181 lb)

Sport
- Sport: Wrestling

Ahmad Afghan (Persian: احمد افغان; born 15 February 1970) was an Iranian wrestler. He competed in the 1988 Summer Olympics.
