= Atsushi Ito (wrestler) =

Japanese wrestler (born 1964)

Personal information
- Nationality: Japanese
- Born: 19 May 1964 (age 61); Hokkaido, Japan

Sport
- Sport: Wrestling

Atsushi Ito (伊藤 敦, Itō Atsushi; born 19 May 1964) is a Japanese wrestler. He competed at the 1988 Summer Olympics and the 1992 Summer Olympics.
