= Timo Niemi =

Finnish wrestler (born 1966)

Personal information
- Nationality: Finnish
- Born: 16 March 1966 (age 60) Kajaani, Finland

Sport
- Sport: Wrestling

Timo Niemi (born 16 March 1966) is a Finnish wrestler. He competed at the 1988 Summer Olympics and the 1992 Summer Olympics.
