= Hans Gstöttner =

German wrestler (born 1967)

Personal information
- Nationality: German
- Born: 2 December 1967 (age 58) Halle, East Germany

Sport
- Sport: Wrestling

Hans Gstöttner (born 2 December 1967) is a German wrestler. He competed at the 1988 Summer Olympics and the 1992 Summer Olympics.

== Highlight achievements ==
- Bronze medal at World Championships, 1994.
- European Champion, 1990. Hans Gstöttner beat the 1989 Espoir World Champion Sebahattin Öztürk in the semifinal and reining World Champion Elmadi Zhabrailov in the final.
- Two-time European Championships silver medalist
- Bronze medal at European Championships, 1991
