= Oumar N'Gom =

Senegalese wrestler

Personal information
- Nationality: Senegalese
- Born: 4 March 1958 (age 67)

Sport
- Sport: Wrestling

Oumar N'Gom (born 4 March 1958) is a Senegalese wrestler. He competed in two events at the 1988 Summer Olympics.
