= Ubaldo Rodríguez =

Puerto Rican wrestler

Personal information
- Nationality: Puerto Rican
- Born: 24 December 1957 (age 67)

Sport
- Sport: Wrestling

Ubaldo Rodríguez (born 24 December 1957) is a Puerto Rican wrestler. He competed in two events at the 1988 Summer Olympics.
