= Pavel Frinta =

Czech wrestler

Personal information
- Nationality: Czech
- Born: 13 August 1969 (age 55); Prague, Czechoslovakia

Sport
- Sport: Wrestling

Pavel Frinta (born 13 August 1969) is a Czech wrestler. He competed at the 1988 Summer Olympics, the 1992 Summer Olympics and the 1996 Summer Olympics.
