= Magnus Fredriksson =

Swedish wrestler

Personal information
- Nationality: Swedish
- Born: 28 January 1960 (age 65); Falköping, Sweden

Sport
- Sport: Wrestling

Magnus Fredriksson (born 28 January 1960) is a Swedish wrestler. He competed at the 1988 Summer Olympics and the 1992 Summer Olympics.
