= Jouni Virpiö =

Finnish ice hockey player

- Born: 21 April 1985 (age 39); Jyväskylä, Finland
- Height: 5 ft 9 in (175 cm)
- Weight: 179 lb (81 kg; 12 st 11 lb)
- Position: Forward
- Shot: Left
- Played for: JYP; Tappara
- NHL draft: Undrafted
- Playing career: 2004–2014

Jouni Virpiö (born 21 April 1985) is a Finnish former professional ice hockey player who played for JYP and Tappara of the SM-liiga.
