= Francisco Iglesias =

Spanish wrestler (born 1964)

Personal information
- Nationality: Spanish
- Born: 16 December 1964 (age 60); Palencia, Spain

Sport
- Sport: Wrestling

Francisco Iglesias (born 16 December 1964) is a Spanish wrestler. He competed at the 1984 Summer Olympics, the 1988 Summer Olympics and the 1992 Summer Olympics.
