= Reiner Trik =

German wrestler (born 1963)

Personal information
- Nationality: German
- Born: 2 June 1963 (age 61); Fluorn-Winzeln, Germany

Sport
- Sport: Wrestling

Reiner Trik (born 2 June 1963) is a German wrestler. He competed at the 1984 Summer Olympics and the 1988 Summer Olympics.
