= Daniel Iglesias =

Argentine wrestler

Personal information
- Nationality: Argentine
- Born: 14 May 1962 (age 62)

Sport
- Sport: Wrestling

Daniel Iglesias (born 14 May 1962) is an Argentine former wrestler. He competed in two events at the 1988 Summer Olympics.
