= Goran Kasum =

Serbian wrestler (born 1966)

Personal information
- Born: 22 June 1966 (age 60) Bitola, Macedonia
- Height: 1.81 m (5 ft 11 in)
- Weight: 94 kg (207 lb)

Sport
- Sport: Greco-Roman wrestling
Medal record
Men's Greco-Roman wrestling
Representing Yugoslavia
World Championships
| Bronze medal – third place | 1990 Ostia | Middleweight |
| Bronze medal – third place | 1991 Varna | Middleweight |
European Championships
| Bronze medal – third place | 1992 Copenhagen | 82kg |
Mediterranean Games
| Gold medal – first place | 1991 Athens | 82 kg |

Goran Kasum (born 22 June 1966 in Bitola, Macedonia) is a former Serbian Greco-Roman Wrestler who competed in the 1988, 1992 and 1996 Summer Olympics. He won bronze medals in the 1990 and 1991 World Wrestling Championships in the Men's 82 kg Greco-Roman Division.
