= Jouni Helminen =

Finnish professional ten-pin bowler (born 1970)

Jouni Helminen (born 27 January 1970 in Pori) is a Finnish professional ten-pin bowler.

== Career highlights ==
EBT - End of year rankings
2004 - 6th
2005 - 3rd
2006 - 12th
2007 - 11th
Top-3 finishes
2004 - 1st, Dutch Brunswick Open
2004 - 2nd, Trofeo Internacional Ciutat de Barcelona
2004 - 3rd, Malta Open Championships
2005 - 1st, Columbia Open-Oltremare Championships
2005 - 2nd, Brunswick Euro Challenge
2006 - 2nd, Brunswick Aalborg International
2007 - 2nd, Brunswick Euro Challenge
2008 - 1st, Brunswick Ballmaster Open
Records
1993 - 557 pins at men's doubles 1 game (with Jouko Kuossari)
1993 - 1478 pins at men's doubles 3 games (with Jouko Kuossari)
