= Jouni Ilomäki =

Finnish wrestler

Personal information
- Nationality: Finnish
- Born: 5 February 1960 (age 65); Lapua, Finland

Sport
- Sport: Wrestling

Jouni Ilomäki (born 5 February 1960) is a Finnish wrestler. He competed at the 1984 Summer Olympics and the 1988 Summer Olympics.
