= László Dvorák =

Hungarian wrestler (born 1964)

László Dvorák (born 24 November 1964 in Kőszeg) is a Hungarian former wrestler who competed in the 1988 Summer Olympics, in the 1992 Summer Olympics, and in the 1996 Summer Olympics.
