= Moustafa Ramadan Hussein =

Egyptian wrestler (born 1967)

Personal information
- Nationality: Egyptian
- Born: 4 February 1967 (age 58)

Sport
- Sport: Wrestling

Moustafa Ramadan Hussein (born 4 February 1967) is an Egyptian wrestler. He competed at the 1988 Summer Olympics, the 1992 Summer Olympics and the 1996 Summer Olympics.
