= Elmadi Zhabrailov =

Russian wrestler (born 1965)

Personal information
- Born: 6 September 1965 (age 60) Khasavyurt, Soviet Union
- Height: 185 cm (6 ft 1 in)

Sport
- Sport: Freestyle wrestling
- Club: Dynamo Almaty
- Coached by: Lukman Zhabrailov (brother)
Medal record
Representing Unified Team
Olympic Games
| Silver medal – second place | 1992 Barcelona | 82 kg |
Representing Soviet Union
World Championships
| Gold medal – first place | 1989 Martigny | 82 kg |
Goodwill Games
| Gold medal – first place | 1990 Seattle | 82 kg |
European Wrestling Championships
| Bronze medal – third place | 1989 Ankara | 82 kg |
| Silver medal – second place | 1990 Poznan | 82 kg |
| Gold medal – first place | 1991 Stuttgart | 82 kg |
Representing Kazakhstan
World Championships
| Silver medal – second place | 1995 Atlanta | 82 kg |
Asian Championships
| Gold medal – first place | 1995 Manila | 82 kg |

Elmadi Zaynaydiyevich Zhabrailov (Russian: Эльмади Зайнайдиевич Жабраилов; born 6 September 1965) is a Russian freestyle wrestler, who competed for the Soviet Union and then Kazakhstan. His elder brother Lukman prepared him for the 1992 Olympics, where Elmadi won a silver medal, losing the final bout to Kevin Jackson. At the next Olympics the brothers competed against each other, and Elmadi won that bout, but placed only sixth overall.

Outside Olympics, Elmadi won the world middleweight title in 1989, placing second in 1995, the European title in 1991, and the Asian title in 1995. After retiring from competitions he headed the federal state institution Minmeliovodhoz in Dagestan, Russia.
