= Barthelémy N'To =

Cameroonian wrestler

Personal information
- Nationality: Cameroonian
- Born: 25 January 1963 (age 62)

Sport
- Sport: Wrestling

Barthelémy N'To (born 25 January 1963) is a Cameroonian wrestler. He competed at the 1984 Summer Olympics and the 1988 Summer Olympics.
