= List of European Championships medalists in wrestling (Greco-Roman) =

This is a List of European Championships medalists in men's Greco-Roman wrestling.

== Light flyweight ==
- 48 kg: 1969–1995

Tournament	Gold	Silver	Bronze
1969 Modena	Rolf Lacour (FRG)	Lorenzo Calafiore (ITA)	Muzaffer Can (TUR)
1970 East Berlin	Gheorghe Berceanu (ROU)	Henrik Gál (HUN)	Lorenzo Calafiore (ITA)
1972 Katowice	Gheorghe Berceanu (ROU)	Stefan Angelov (BUL)	Vladimir Zubkov (URS)
1973 Helsinki	Gheorghe Berceanu (ROU)	Pavel Jristov (BUL)	Vladimir Netsvetayev (URS)
1974 Madrid	Constantin Alexandru (ROU)	Aleksey Shumakov (URS)	Antonio Quistelli (ITA)
1975 Ludwigshafen	Constantin Alexandru (ROU)	Aleksey Shumakov (URS)	Ferenc Seres (HUN)
1976 Leningrad	Aleksey Shumakov (URS)	Constantin Alexandru (ROU)	Ferenc Seres (HUN)
1977 Bursa	Constantin Alexandru (ROU)	Anatoli Bozin (URS)	Wiesław Kuciński (POL)
1978 Sofia	Constantin Alexandru (ROU)	Anatoli Bozin (URS)	Dietmar Hinz (GDR)
1979 Bucharest	Constantin Alexandru (ROU)	Pavel Jristov (BUL)	Anatoli Bozin (URS)
1980 Prievidza	Roman Kierpacz (POL)	Zhaksylyk Ushkempirov (URS)	Totio Andonov (BUL)
1981 Lodz	Totio Andonov (BUL)	Viktor Savchuk (URS)	Salih Bora (TUR)
1982 Varna	Vasili Anikin (URS)	Csaba Vadász (HUN)	Totio Andonov (BUL)
1983 Budapest	Bratan Tsenov (BUL)	Vasili Anikin (URS)	Csaba Vadász (HUN)
1984 Jönköping	Maguiatdin Alajverdiyev (URS)	Vincenzo Maenza (ITA); Ortse Ortsev (BUL)	None awarded
1985 Leipzig	Bratan Tsenov (BUL)	Bernd Scherer (FRG)	Temo Kasarashvili (URS)
1986 Piraeus	Ivan Samtayev (URS)	Bratan Tsenov (BUL)	Vincenzo Maenza (ITA)
1987 Tampere	Vincenzo Maenza (ITA)	Bratan Tsenov (BUL)	Sergey Suvorov (URS)
1988 Kolbotn	Lars Rønningen (NOR)	Sergey Suvorov (URS)	Bratan Tsenov (BUL)
1989 Oulu	Markus Scherer (GER)	Daniel Yankov (BUL)	Oleg Kutscherenko (URS)
1990 Poznan	Sergey Suvorov (URS)	Iliuţă Dăscălescu (ROU)	József Faragó (HUN)
1991 Aschaffenburg	József Faragó (HUN)	Sergey Suvorov (URS)	Nuran Pelikyan (BUL)
1992 Kopenhag	Lars Rønningen (NOR)	Iliuţă Dăscălescu (ROU)	Zafar Guliev (CIS)
1993 İstanbul	Zafar Guliev (RUS)	Nik Zagranitchni (ISR)	Gela Papashvili (GEO)
1994 Athens	Zafar Guliev (RUS)	József Hamzók (HUN)	Ioannis Agatzanian (GRE)
1995 Besançon	Ioannis Agatzanian (GRE)	Zafar Guliev (RUS)	Oleg Kutscherenko (GER)
1996 Budapest	Zafar Guliev (RUS)	Ioannis Agatzanian (GRE)	Francesco Costantino (ITA)

== Flyweight ==
- 52 kg: 1950–1995
- 54 kg: 1997–2001
- 55 kg: 2018–

Tournament	Gold	Silver	Bronze
1947 Prag	Bertil Sundin (SWE)	Muhammed el-Vard (EGY)	Lennart Viitala (FIN)
1966 Essen	Vladimir Bakulin (URS)	Boško Marinko (YUG)	Maurice Mewis (BEL)
1967 Minsk	Petar Kirov (BUL)	Sergey Rıbalko (URS)	Rolf Lacour (GER)
1968 Västerås	Ivan Kochergin (URS)	Petar Kirov (BUL)	Jussi Vesterinen (FIN)
1969 Modena	Boško Marinko (YUG)	Şefik Namlı (TUR)	Fritz Huber (FRG)
1970 East Berlin	Petar Kirov (BUL)	Boško Marinko (YUG)	Klim Olzoyev (URS)
1972 Katowice	Jan Michalik (POL)	Vitali Konstantinov (URS)	Petar Kirov (BUL)
1973 Helsinki	Jan Michalik (POL)	Todor Todorov (BUL)	Valeri Arutiunov (URS)
1974 Madrid	Petar Kirov (BUL)	Valeri Arutiunov (URS)	Nicu Gingă (ROU)
1975 Ludwigshafen	Rolf Krauß (FRG)	Valeri Arutiunov (URS)	Bilal Tabur (TUR)
1976 Leningrad	Petar Kirov (BUL)	Vladimir Shatunov (URS)	Charalambos Cholidis (GRE)
1977 Bursa	Lajos Rácz (HUN)	Nicu Gingă (ROU)	Kamil Fatkulin (URS)
1978 Sofia	Vahtang Blagidze (URS)	Lajos Rácz (HUN)	Nicu Gingă (ROU)
1979 Bucharest	Robert Nersesian (URS)	Nicu Gingă (ROU)	Lajos Rácz (HUN)
1980 Prievidza	Vakhtang Blagidze (URS)	Rolf Krauß (FRG)	Mladen Mladenov (BUL)
1981 Lodz	Benur Pashayan (URS)	Lajos Rácz (HUN)	Liubomir Tsekov (BUL)
1982 Varna	Benur Pashayan (URS)	Gheorghe Ştefan (ROU)	Roman Kierpacz (POL)
1983 Budapest	Lajos Rácz (HUN)	Sergey Diudiayev (URS)	Roman Kierpacz (POL)
1984 Jönköping	Minseit Tazetdinov (URS)	Mihai Cişmaşu (ROU)	Velin Dogandzhidski (BUL)
1985 Leipzig	Roman Kierpacz (POL)	Minseit Tazetdinov (URS)	Valentin Krumov (BUL)
1986 Piraeus	Sergey Didiayev (URS)	Mihai Cișmașu (ROU)	Jon Rønningen (NOR)
1987 Tampere	Andriy Kalashnykov (URS)	Csaba Vadász (HUN)	Roman Kierpacz (POL)
1988 Kolbotn	Aleksandr Ignatenko (URS)	Jon Rønningen (NOR)	Valentin Krumov (BUL)
1989 Oulu	Senad Rizvanović (YUG)	Ismo Kamesaki (FIN)	Valentin Krumov (BUL)
1990 Poznan	Jon Rønningen (NOR)	Oleg Kutscherenko (URS)	Valentin Krumov (BUL)
1991 Aschaffenburg	Bratan Tsenov (BUL)	Dariusz Piaskowski (POL)	Alfred Ter-Mkrtchyan (URS)
1992 Kopenhag	Alfred Ter-Mkrtchyan (CIS)	Bratan Tsenov (BUL)	Remzi Öztürk (TUR)
1993 İstanbul	Natig Eyvazov (AZE)	Andriy Kalashnykov (UKR)	Samvel Danielyan (RUS)
1994 Athens	Armen Nazaryan (ARM)	Farjat Magueramov (BLR)	Alfred Ter-Mkrtchyan (GER)
1995 Besançon	Armen Nazaryan (ARM)	Alfred Ter-Mkrtchyan (GER)	Andriy Kalashnykov (UKR)
1996 Budapest	Andriy Kalashnykov (UKR)	Armen Nazaryan (ARM)	Alfred Ter-Mkrtchyan (GER)
1997 Kouvola	Dariusz Jabłoński (POL)	Farjat Magueramov (BLR)	Oleg Nemchenko (RUS)
1998 Minsk	Boris Ambartsumov (RUS)	Natig Eyvazov (AZE)	Marian Sandu (ROU)
1999 Sofia	Samvel Danielyan (RUS)	Dariusz Jabłoński (POL)	Natig Eyvazov (AZE)
2000 Moscow	Marian Sandu (ROU)	Boris Ambartsumov (RUS)	Alfred Ter-Mkrtchyan (GER)
2001 İstanbul	Boris Radkevich (BLR)	Ercan Yıldız (TUR)	Dariusz Jabłoński (POL)
2018 Kaspiysk	Eldaniz Azizli (AZE)	Helary Mägisalu (EST)	Nugzari Tsurtsumia (GEO)
2018 Kaspiysk	Eldaniz Azizli (AZE)	Helary Mägisalu (EST)	Ekrem Öztürk (TUR)
2019 Bucharest	Vitalii Kabaloev (RUS)	Florin Tiţa (ROU)	Fabian Schmitt (GER)
2019 Bucharest	Vitalii Kabaloev (RUS)	Florin Tiţa (ROU)	Eldaniz Azizli (AZE)
2020 Rome	Edmond Nazaryan (BUL)	Vitalii Kabaloev (RUS)	Eldaniz Azizli (AZE)
2020 Rome	Edmond Nazaryan (BUL)	Vitalii Kabaloev (RUS)	Nugzari Tsurtsumia (GEO)
2021 Warsaw	Emin Sefershaev (RUS)	Ekrem Öztürk (TUR)	Eldaniz Azizli (AZE)
2021 Warsaw	Emin Sefershaev (RUS)	Ekrem Öztürk (TUR)	Rudik Mkrtchyan (ARM)
2022 Budapest	Eldaniz Azizli (AZE)	Nugzari Tsurtsumia (GEO)	Rudik Mkrtchyan (ARM)
2022 Budapest	Eldaniz Azizli (AZE)	Nugzari Tsurtsumia (GEO)	Emre Mutlu (TUR)
2023 Zagreb	Adem Uzun (TUR)	Eldaniz Azizli (AZE)	Nugzari Tsurtsumia (GEO)
2023 Zagreb	Adem Uzun (TUR)	Eldaniz Azizli (AZE)	Denis Mihai (ROU)
2024 Bucharest	Artiom Deleanu (MDA)	Rashad Mammadov (AZE)	Denis Mihai (ROU)
2024 Bucharest	Artiom Deleanu (MDA)	Rashad Mammadov (AZE)	Manvel Khachatryan (ARM)

== Bantamweight ==
- 58 kg: 1921–1922
- 57 kg: 1950–1995
- 58 kg: 1997–2001
- 55 kg: 2002–2013
- 59 kg: 2014–2017
- 60 kg: 2018–

Tournament	Gold	Silver	Bronze
1924 Neunkirchen	Waltet Huck (GER)	Artur Zirkel (GER)	Heinrich Zehmer (GER)
1925 Milano	Armand Magyar (HUN)	Giovanni Gozzi (ITA)	Carlo Ponte (ITA)
1926 Riga	Sigfrid Hansson (SWE)	Paul Reiber (GER)	Armand Magyar (HUN)
1927 Budapest	Giovanni Gozzi (ITA)	Eduard Pütsep (EST)	Armand Magyar (HUN)
1929 Dortmund	Sven Martinsen (NOR)	Erland Nielsen (DEN)	Antonín Nič (TCH)
1930 Stockholm	Herman Tuvesson (SWE)	Jakob Brendel (GER)	László Szekfű (HUN)
1931 Prag	Herman Tuvesson (SWE)	Kurt Leucht (GER)	Marcello Nizzola (ITA)
1933 Helsinki	Ödön Zombori (HUN)	Herman Tuvesson (SWE)	Robert Voigt (GER)
1934 Rome	Herman Tuvesson (SWE)	Ödön Zombori (HUN)	Ion Horvath (ROM)
1935 Kopenhag	Herman Tuvesson (SWE)	Antonín Nič (TCH)	Esko Hjelt (FIN)
1937 Paris	Dante Bertoli (ITA)	Egon Svensson (SWE)	Antonín Nič (TCH)
1938 Tallinn	Väinö Perttunen (FIN)	Kurt Pettersén (SWE)	Ferdinand Schmitz (GER)
1939 Oslo	Kauko Kiiseli (FIN)	Ivar Stokke (NOR)	Kurt Pettersén (SWE)
1947 Prag	Mahmud Hasan (EGY)	Reidar Merli (NOR)	Lorentz Freij (SWE)
1966 Essen	Fritz Stange (FRG)	Armais Sayadov (URS)	Ion Baciu (ROU)
1967 Minsk	János Varga (HUN)	Hartmut Puls (GDR)	Rustam Kazakov (URS)
1968 Västerås	Hristo Traykov (BUL)	János Varga (HUN)	Risto Björlin (FIN)
1969 Modena	Risto Björlin (FIN)	Karlo Čović (YUG)	Giuseppe Bognanni (ITA)
1970 East Berlin	János Varga (HUN)	Ion Baciu (ROU)	Hristo Traykov (BUL)
1972 Katowice	Hristo Traykov (BUL)	Yuri Sokolov (URS)	Ion Baciu (ROU)
1973 Helsinki	Hristo Traikov (BUL)	Yuri Sokolov (URS)	Ivan Frgić (YUG)
1974 Madrid	Farhat Mustafin (URS)	Risto Björlin (FIN)	Ion Dulică (ROU)
1975 Ludwigshafen	Ivan Frgić (YUG)	Farhat Mustafin (URS)	Bernd Drechsel (GDR)
1976 Leningrad	Farhat Mustafin (URS)	Mihai Boţilă (ROU)	Josef Krysta (TCH)
1977 Bursa	Pertti Ukkola (FIN)	Farhat Mustafin (URS)	Mihai Boţilă (ROU)
1978 Sofia	Vladimir Pogudin (URS)	Mihai Boţilă (ROU)	Józef Lipień (POL)
1979 Bucharest	Shamil Serikov (URS)	Pasquale Passarelli (FRG)	Josef Krysta (TCH)
1980 Prievidza	Vitaly Konstantinov (URS)	Benni Ljungbeck (SWE)	Julien Mewis (BEL)
1981 Lodz	Pasquale Passarelli (FRG)	Benni Ljungbeck (SWE)	Piotr Michalik (POL)
1982 Varna	Petar Balov (BUL)	Josef Krysta (TCH)	Mehmet Serhat Karadağ (TUR)
1983 Budapest	Emil Ivanov (BUL)	Charalambos Cholidis (GRE)	Vasili Fomin (URS)
1984 Jönköping	Kamil Fatkulin (URS)	Pasquale Passarelli (GDR)	Petar Balov (BUL)
1985 Leipzig	Oganes Arutunian (URS)	Nicolae Zamfir (ROU)	Benni Ljungbeck (SWE)
1986 Piraeus	Timerzian Kalimulin (URS)	Jarálambos Jolidis (GRE)	Keijo Pehkonen (FIN)
1987 Tampere	Keijo Pehkonen (FIN)	Emil Ivanov (BUL)	Patrice Mourier (FRA)
1988 Kolbotn	Aleksandr Shestakov (URS)	Stoyan Balov (BUL)	András Sike (HUN)
1989 Oulu	Keijo Pehkonen (FIN)	Emil Ivanov (BUL)	Sergei Bulanov (URS)
1990 Poznan	Patrice Mourier (FRA)	András Sike (HUN)	Rıfat Yıldız (GER)
1991 Aschaffenburg	Aleksandr Ignatenko (URS)	Marian Sandu (ROU)	Rıfat Yıldız (GER)
1992 Kopenhag	Rıfat Yıldız (GER)	Marian Sandu (ROU)	Isaak Theodoridis (GRE)
1993 İstanbul	Mikael Lindgren (FIN)	Ruslan Khakymov (UKR)	Marian Sandu (ROU)
1994 Athens	Şeref Eroğlu (TUR)	Aristidis Rubenian (GRE)	Marian Sandu (ROU)
1995 Besançon	Ruslan Khakymov (UKR)	Aghasi Manukyan (ARM)	Jan Ulbrich (GER)
1996 Budapest	Şeref Eroğlu (TUR)	Marian Sandu (ROU)	Rıfat Yıldız (GER)
1997 Kouvola	Karen Mnatsakanyan (ARM)	Djamel Ainaoui (FRA)	Ergüder Bekişdamat (TUR)
1998 Minsk	Armen Nazaryan (BUL)	Rafik Simonian (RUS)	Igor Petrenko (BLR)
1999 Sofia	Armen Nazaryan (BUL)	Valery Nikonorov (RUS)	Karen Mnatsakanyan (ARM)
2000 Moscow	István Majoros (HUN)	Armen Nazaryan (BUL)	Rıfat Yıldız (GER)
2001 İstanbul	Petr Švehla (CZE)	Irakli Chochua (GEO)	Marian Sandu (ROU)
2002 Seinäjoki	Armen Nazaryan (BUL)	Rustem Mambetov (RUS)	Djamel Ainaoui (FRA)
2003 Belgrad	Armen Nazaryan (BUL)	Suren Hevorkian (UKR)	Rustem Mambetov (RUS)
2004 Haparanda	Vahan Juharyan (ARM)	Davor Štefanek (SCG)	Ivan Alexandrov (ISR)
2005 Varna	Vitaliy Rahimov (AZE)	Eusebiu Diaconu (ROU)	Alexei Shevtsov (RUS)
2005 Varna	Vitaliy Rahimov (AZE)	Eusebiu Diaconu (ROU)	Davit Bedinadze (GEO)
2006 Moscow	Karen Mnatsakanyan (ARM)	Davit Bedinadze (GEO)	Fuad Aliyev (AZE)
2006 Moscow	Karen Mnatsakanyan (ARM)	Davit Bedinadze (GEO)	Vyacheslav Djaste (RUS)
2007 Sofia	Eusebiu Diaconu (ROU)	Stig Andre Berge (NOR)	Suren Gevorkian (UKR)
2007 Sofia	Eusebiu Diaconu (ROU)	Stig Andre Berge (NOR)	Jarkko Ala-Huikku (FIN)
2008 Tampere	Jarkko Ala-Huikku (FIN)	Armen Nazaryan (BUL)	Davor Štefanek (SRB)
2008 Tampere	Jarkko Ala-Huikku (FIN)	Armen Nazaryan (BUL)	Håkan Nyblom (DEN)
2009 Vilnius	Islambek Albiev (RUS)	Edward Barsegjan (POL)	Ivo Angelov (BUL)
2009 Vilnius	Islambek Albiev (RUS)	Edward Barsegjan (POL)	Eusebiu Diaconu (ROU)
2010 Bakü	Hasan Aliyev (AZE)	Kostyantyn Balitskyy (UKR)	Zaur Kuramagomedov (RUS)
2010 Bakü	Hasan Aliyev (AZE)	Kostyantyn Balitskyy (UKR)	Tonimir Sokol (CRO)
2011 Dortmund	Revaz Lashkhi (GEO)	Ivo Angelov (BUL)	Mustafa Sağlam (TUR)
2011 Dortmund	Revaz Lashkhi (GEO)	Ivo Angelov (BUL)	Hasan Aliyev (AZE)
2012 Belgrad	Lévai István (SVK)	Ivo Angelov (BUL)	Davor Stefanek (SRB)
2012 Belgrad	Lévai István (SVK)	Ivo Angelov (BUL)	Arslan Abdullin (RUS)
2013 Tiflis	Ivo Angelov (BUL)	Ivan Kuylakov (RUS)	Kamran Mammadov (AZE)
2013 Tiflis	Ivo Angelov (BUL)	Ivan Kuylakov (RUS)	Lévai István (SVK)
2014 Vantaa	Aleksandar Kostadinov (BUL)	Victor Ciobanu (MDA)	Kamran Mammadov (AZE)
2014 Vantaa	Aleksandar Kostadinov (BUL)	Victor Ciobanu (MDA)	Ivan Kuylakov (RUS)
2015 Baku	Stepan Maryanyan (RUS)	Soslan Daurov (BLR)	Elman Mukhtarov (AZE)
2015 Baku	Stepan Maryanyan (RUS)	Soslan Daurov (BLR)	Tarik Belmadani (FRA)
2016 Riga	Mingiyan Semenov (RUS)	Roman Amoyan (ARM)	Donior Islamov (MDA)
2016 Riga	Mingiyan Semenov (RUS)	Roman Amoyan (ARM)	Dmytro Tsymbaliuk (UKR)
2017 Novi Sad	Kristijan Fris (SRB)	Ivo Angelov (BUL)	Mingiyan Semenov (RUS)
2017 Novi Sad	Kristijan Fris (SRB)	Ivo Angelov (BUL)	Ivan Lizatović (CRO)
2018 Kaspiysk	Sergey Emelin (RUS)	Murad Mammadov (AZE)	Jacopo Sandron (ITA)
2018 Kaspiysk	Sergey Emelin (RUS)	Murad Mammadov (AZE)	Dato Chkhartishvili (GEO)
2019 Bucharest	Victor Ciobanu (MDA)	Sergey Emelin (RUS)	Lenur Temirov (UKR)
2019 Bucharest	Victor Ciobanu (MDA)	Sergey Emelin (RUS)	Kerem Kamal (TUR)
2020 Rome	Gevorg Gharibyan (ARM)	Kerem Kamal (TUR)	Murad Bazarov (AZE)
2020 Rome	Gevorg Gharibyan (ARM)	Kerem Kamal (TUR)	Amiran Shavadze (GEO)
2021 Warsaw	Sergey Emelin (RUS)	Kerem Kamal (TUR)	Viktor Petryk (UKR)
2021 Warsaw	Sergey Emelin (RUS)	Kerem Kamal (TUR)	Răzvan Arnăut (ROU)
2022 Budapest	Kerem Kamal (TUR)	Edmond Nazaryan (BUL)	Murad Mammadov (AZE)
2022 Budapest	Kerem Kamal (TUR)	Edmond Nazaryan (BUL)	Gevorg Gharibyan (ARM)
2023 Zagreb	Edmond Nazaryan (BUL)	Victor Ciobanu (MDA)	Nihat Mammadli (AZE)
2023 Zagreb	Edmond Nazaryan (BUL)	Victor Ciobanu (MDA)	Georgii Tibilov (SRB)
2024 Bucharest	Nihat Mammadli (AZE)	Victor Ciobanu (MDA)	Sadyk Lalaev (ANA)
2024 Bucharest	Nihat Mammadli (AZE)	Victor Ciobanu (MDA)	Răzvan Arnăut (ROU)

== Featherweight ==
- 60 kg: 1911–1920
- 62 kg: 1921–1961
- 63 kg: 1962–1967
- 62 kg: 1969–1995
- 63 kg: 1997–2001
- 60 kg: 2002–2013
- 63 kg: 2018–

Tournament	Gold	Silver	Bronze
1921 Offenbach	Jonny Andersen (GER)	Herman Brodbeck (GER)	Georg Gerstäcker (GER)
1924 Neunkirchen	Karl Völkein (GER)	Gustav Haber (GER)	Georg Schung (GER)
1925 Milano	Jenő Németh (HUN)	Ernst Steinig (GER)	Erik Malmberg (SWE)
1926 Riga	Voldemar Väli (EST)	Erik Malmberg (SWE)	Ernst Steinig (GER)
1927 Budapest	Voldemar Väli (EST)	Károly Kárpáti (HUN)	Martin Egeberg (NOR)
1929 Dortmund	Folke Hernström (SWE)	Aage Torgensen (DEN)	Eugen Fleischmann (TCH)
1930 Stockholm	Kustaa Pihlajamäki (FIN)	Sven Martinsen (NOR)	Ödön Zombori (HUN)
1931 Prag	Kustaa Pihlajamäki (FIN)	Sebastian Hering (GER)	Jindřich Maudr (TCH)
1933 Helsinki	Kustaa Pihlajamäki (FIN)	Wolfgang Ehrl (GER)	Sven Martinsen (NOR)
1934 Rome	Kustaa Pihlajamäki (FIN)	Ferenc Tóth (HUN)	Giovanni Gozzi (ITA)
1935 Kopenhag	Sebastian Hering (GER)	Hermanni Pihlajamäki (FIN)	Aage Meier (DEN)
1937 Paris	Kustaa Pihlajamäki (FIN)	Heinrich Schwarzkopf (GER)	Einar Karlsson (SWE)
1938 Tallinn	Kustaa Pihlajamäki (FIN)	Egon Svensson (SWE)	Egil Solsvik (NOR)
1939 Oslo	Kustaa Pihlajamäki (FIN)	Ferdinand Schmitz (GER)	Ferenc Tóth (HUN)
1947 Prag	Olle Anderberg (SWE)	Ferenc Tóth (HUN)	František Kotrbatý (TCH)
1966 Essen	Sergey Agamov (URS)	Leif Freij (SWE)	Simion Popescu (ROU)
1967 Minsk	Simion Popescu (ROU)	Sergey Agamov (URS)	Jiří Švec (TCH)
1968 Västerås	Yuri Grigoriev (URS)	Jiří Švec (TCH)	İlhan Topsakal (TUR)
1969 Modena	Metin Alakoç (TUR)	Werner Hettich (FRG)	Michele Toma (ITA)
1970 East Berlin	Heinz-Helmut Wehling (GDR)	Martti Laakso (FIN)	Ivan Kaspar (TCH)
1972 Katowice	Georgi Markov (BUL)	Martti Laakso (FIN)	Kazimierz Lipień (POL)
1973 Helsinki	Nelson Davidyan (URS)	Kazimierz Lipień (POL)	Harald Hervig (NOR)
1974 Madrid	Anatoly Kavkayev (URS)	Georgi Markov (BUL)	Ion Păun (ROU)
1975 Ludwigshafen	Kazimierz Lipień (POL)	Anatoly Kavkayev (URS)	Stoyan Lazarov (BUL)
1976 Leningrad	Kazimierz Lipień (POL)	Ion Păun (ROU)	Suren Nalbandyan (URS)
1977 Bursa	Ion Păun (ROU)	Nelson Davidyan (URS)	László Réczi (HUN)
1978 Sofia	Kazimierz Lipień (POL)	Ion Păun (ROU)	Tamás Tóth (HUN)
1979 Bucharest	Stylianós Myyakis (GRE)	Tamás Tóth (HUN)	Kazimierz Lipień (POL)
1980 Prievidza	Nelson Davidyan (URS)	Ryszard Świerad (POL)	Ion Păun (ROU)
1981 Lodz	Ryszard Świerad (POL)	Panayot Kirov (BUL)	Farhat Mustafin (URS)
1982 Varna	Roman Nasibulov (URS)	Panayot Kirov (BUL)	Tamás Tóth (HUN)
1983 Budapest	Zhivko Vangelov (BUL)	Constantin Uță (ROU)	Aleksandr Litvinov (URS)
1984 Jönköping	Kamandar Madzhidov (URS)	Günter Reichelt (GDR)	Constantin Uță (ROU)
1985 Leipzig	Kamandar Madzhidov (URS)	Bogusław Klozik (POL)	Árpád Sipos (HUN)
1986 Piraeus	Árpád Sipos (HUN)	Benni Ljungbeck (SWE)	Hugo Dietsche (SUI)
1987 Tampere	Zhivko Vanguelov (BUL)	Vasili Vozni (URS)	Jenő Bódi (HUN)
1988 Kolbotn	Jenő Bódi (HUN)	Nencho Nenchev (BUL)	Arutik Rubenian (URS)
1989 Oulu	Ryszard Wolny (POL)	József Szuromi (HUN)	Guennadi Atmakin (URS)
1990 Poznan	Guennadi Atmakin (URS)	Jenő Bódi (HUN)	Ryszard Wolny (POL)
1991 Aschaffenburg	Włodzimierz Zawadzki (POL)	Mario Büttner (GER)	Guennadi Atmakin (URS)
1992 Kopenhag	Sergey Martınov (CIS)	Hugo Dietsche (SUI)	Jenő Bódi (HUN)
1993 İstanbul	Sergey Martınov (RUS)	Jenő Bódi (HUN)	Gueorgui Saskavets (BLR)
1994 Athens	Hrihoriy Kamyshenko (UKR)	Aghasi Manukyan (ARM)	Igor Petrenko (BLR)
1995 Besançon	Włodzimierz Zawadzki (POL)	Sergey Martınov (RUS)	Igor Petrenko (BLR)
1996 Budapest	Sergey Martınov (RUS)	Grigoriy Kamişenko (UKR)	Mhitar Manukyan (ARM)
1997 Kouvola	Nikolai Monov (RUS)	Şeref Eroğlu (TUR)	Akaki Chachua (GEO)
1998 Minsk	Şeref Eroğlu (TUR)	Nikolai Monov (RUS)	Oleh Lytvynenko (UKR)
1999 Sofia	Włodzimierz Zawadzki (POL)	Akaki Chachua (GEO)	Şeref Eroğlu (TUR)
2000 Moscow	Varteres Samurgashev (RUS)	Beat Motzer (SUI)	Vital Juk (BLR)
2001 İstanbul	Şeref Eroğlu (TUR)	Temur Tejumov (RUS)	Włodzimierz Zawadzki (POL)
2018 Kaspiysk	Mihai Mihuț (ROU)	Stig-André Berge (NOR)	Donior Islamov (MDA)
2018 Kaspiysk	Mihai Mihuț (ROU)	Stig-André Berge (NOR)	Zaur Kabaloev (RUS)
2019 Bucharest	Stepan Maryanyan (RUS)	Stig-André Berge (NOR)	Levani Kavjaradze (GEO)
2019 Bucharest	Stepan Maryanyan (RUS)	Stig-André Berge (NOR)	Taleh Mammadov (AZE)
2020 Rome	Maksim Nehoda (BLR)	Ibragim Labazanov (RUS)	Erik Torba (HUN)
2020 Rome	Maksim Nehoda (BLR)	Ibragim Labazanov (RUS)	Lenur Temirov (UKR)
2021 Warsaw	Zhambolat Lokyaev (RUS)	Taleh Mammadov (AZE)	Aleksandrs Jurkjans (LAT)
2021 Warsaw	Zhambolat Lokyaev (RUS)	Taleh Mammadov (AZE)	Leri Abuladze (GEO)
2022 Budapest	Leri Abuladze (GEO)	Taleh Mammadov (AZE)	Oleksandr Hrushyn (UKR)
2022 Budapest	Leri Abuladze (GEO)	Taleh Mammadov (AZE)	Ahmet Uyar (TUR)
2023 Zagreb	Leri Abuladze (GEO)	Taleh Mammadov (AZE)	Abu Muslim Amaev (BUL)
2023 Zagreb	Leri Abuladze (GEO)	Taleh Mammadov (AZE)	Hrachya Poghosyan (ARM)
2024 Bucharest	Murad Mammadov (AZE)	Oleksandr Hrushyn (UKR)	Edmond Nazaryan (BUL)
2024 Bucharest	Murad Mammadov (AZE)	Oleksandr Hrushyn (UKR)	Anvar Allakhiarov (ANA)

== Lightweight ==
- 68 kg: 1905
- 75 kg: 1907
- 60 kg: 1910
- 67 kg: 1911
- 67.5 kg: 1913–1922
- 67 kg: 1950–1961
- 70 kg: 1962–1967
- 68 kg: 1969–1995
- 69 kg: 1997–2001
- 66 kg: 2002–2017
- 67 kg: 2018–

Tournament	Gold	Silver	Bronze
1911 Budapest	Károly Márton (Austria-Hungary)	Walter Sohn (GER)	Jenő Dulin (Austria-Hungary)
1921 Offenbach	Fritz Eichblatt (GER)	Heinrich Stiefel (GER)	Otto Ulrich (GER)
1924 Neunkirchen	Hermann Baruch (GER)	Robert Blech (GER)	Robert Hoffmann (GER)
1925 Milano	Lajos Keresztes (HUN)	Ludwig Sesta (AUT)	Mihály Matura (HUN)
1926 Riga	Harald Pettersson (SWE)	Osvald Käpp (EST)	Mihály Matura (HUN)
1927 Budapest	Eduard Sperling (GER)	Harald Pettersson (SWE)	Osvald Käpp (EST)
1929 Dortmund	Eduard Sperling (GER)	Torsten Bergström (SWE)	Silvio Tozzi (ITA)
1930 Stockholm	Erik Malmberg (SWE)	Voldemar Väli (EST)	Károly Kárpáti (HUN)
1931 Prag	Eduard Sperling (GER)	Voldemar Väli (EST)	Arild Dahl (NOR)
1933 Helsinki	Aarne Reini (FIN)	Einar Karlsson (SWE)	Arild Dahl (NOR)
1934 Rome	Aarne Reini (FIN)	Abraham Kurland (DEN)	Einar Karlsson (SWE)
1935 Kopenhag	Lauri Koskela (FIN)	Abraham Kurland (DEN)	Wolfgang Ehrl (GER)
1937 Paris	Lauri Koskela (FIN)	Herbert Olofsson (SWE)	Fritz Weikart (GER)
1938 Tallinn	Lauri Koskela (FIN)	Heinrich Nettesheim (GER)	Gösta Andersson (SWE)
1939 Oslo	Gösta Frändfors (SWE)	Yaşar Doğu (TUR)	Lauri Koskela (FIN)
1947 Prag	Gösta Frändfors (SWE)	Armenak Yaltıryan (URS)	Celal Atik (TUR)
1966 Essen	Klaus-Jürgen Pohl (GDR)	Antal Steer (HUN)	Branislav Martinović (YUG)
1967 Minsk	Gennady Sapunov (URS)	Eero Tapio (FIN)	Klaus-Jürgen Pohl (GDR)
1968 Västerås	Vladimir Novokhatko (URS)	Matti Poikala (SWE)	Antal Steer (HUN)
1969 Modena	Sreten Damjanović (YUG)	Vahap Pehlivan (TUR)	Matti Poikala (SWE)
1970 East Berlin	Klaus-Peter Göpfert (GDR)	Sreten Damjanović (YUG)	Manfred Schöndorfer (FRG)
1972 Katowice	Jürgen Hähnel (GDR)	Antal Steer (HUN)	Andrzej Supron (POL)
1973 Helsinki	Shamil Khisamutdinov (URS)	Nedko Nedev (BUL)	Sreten Damjanović (YUG)
1974 Madrid	Shamil Khisamutdinov (URS)	Andrzej Supron (POL)	Heinz-Helmut Wehling (GDR)
1975 Ludwigshafen	Andrzej Supron (POL)	Viktor Kuzmin (URS)	Lars-Erik Skiöld (SWE)
1976 Leningrad	Lars-Erik Skiöld (SWE)	Ștefan Negrișan (ROU)	Shamil Khisamutdinov (URS)
1977 Bursa	Suren Nalbandyan (URS)	Ștefan Negrișan (ROU)	İhsan Mutlu (TUR)
1978 Sofia	Ștefan Negrișan (ROU)	Nikolay Dimov (BUL)	Károly Gaál (HUN)
1979 Bucharest	Ștefan Negrișan (ROU)	Ivan Saikov (BUL)	Andrzej Supron (POL)
1980 Prievidza	Ștefan Negrișan (ROU)	Anatoli Kravchenko (URS)	Tapio Sipilä (FIN)
1981 Lodz	Ștefan Negrișan (ROU)	Erich Klaus (FRG)	Tapio Sipilä (FIN)
1982 Varna	Guennadi Ermilov (URS)	Ștefan Negrișan (ROU)	Gerry Svensson (SWE)
1983 Budapest	Guennadi Ermilov (URS)	Jerzy Kopański (POL)	Tapio Sipilä (FIN)
1984 Jönköping	Mihail Prokudin (URS)	Ștefan Negrișan (ROU)	Panayot Kirov (BUL)
1985 Leipzig	Mihail Prokudin (URS)	Ștefan Negrișan (ROU)	Stanisław Barej (POL)
1986 Piraeus	Levon Julfalakyan (URS)	Rumen Tenev (BUL)	Stanisław Barej (POL)
1987 Tampere	Aslaudin Abayev (URS)	Jerzy Kopański (POL)	Tapio Sipilä (FIN)
1988 Kolbotn	Attila Repka (HUN)	Petrică Cărare (ROU)	Lars Lagerborg (SWE)
1989 Oulu	Attila Repka (HUN)	Mnatsakan Iskandaryan (URS)	Jukka Loikas; Finland; Ghani Yalouz; France
1990 Poznan	Islam Dugushiev (URS)	Petrică Cărare (ROU)	Ghani Yalouz (FRA)
1991 Aschaffenburg	Kamandar Madzhidov (URS)	Marthin Kornbakk (SWE)	Attila Repka (HUN)
1992 Kopenhag	Ghani Yalouz (FRA)	Attila Repka (HUN)	Valeri Nikitin (EST)
1993 İstanbul	Islam Dugushiev (RUS)	Oleg Tokarev (MDA)	Kamandar Madzhidov (BLR)
1994 Athens	Attila Repka (HUN)	Ghani Yalouz (FRA)	Islam Dugushiev (RUS)
1995 Besançon	Ghani Yalouz (FRA)	Ryszard Wolny (POL)	Marko Yli-Hannuksela (FIN)
1996 Budapest	Attila Repka (HUN)	Aleksandr Tretyakov (RUS)	Ghani Yalouz (FRA)
1997 Kouvola	Aleksandr Tretyakov (RUS)	Guiorgui Dzhindzhelashvili (GEO)	Rustam Adzhi (UKR)
1998 Minsk	Aleksandr Tretyakov (RUS)	Vladimir Kopytov (BLR)	Adam Juretzko (GER)
1999 Sofia	Aleksey Glushkov (RUS)	Ryszard Wolny (POL)	Biser Georgiev (BUL)
2000 Moscow	Aleksey Glushkov (RUS)	Csaba Hirbik (HUN)	Movses Karapetyan (ARM)
2001 İstanbul	Aleksandr Dokturishvili (GEO)	Mihail Ivanchenko (RUS)	Movses Karapetyan (ARM)
2002 Seinäjoki	Şeref Eroğlu (TUR)	Manuchar Kvirkvelia (GEO)	Michael Beilin (ISR)
2003 Belgrad	Şeref Eroğlu (TUR)	Armen Vardanyan (UKR)	Sergey Kuntarev (RUS)
2004 Haparanda	Armen Vardanyan (UKR)	Vitaly Zhuk (BLR)	Ari-Pekka Härkänen (FIN)
2005 Varna	Nikolay Gergov (BUL)	Christian Fetzer (GER)	Moisés Sánchez (ESP)
2005 Varna	Nikolay Gergov (BUL)	Christian Fetzer (GER)	Sergey Kovalenko (RUS)
2006 Moscow	Tamás Lőrincz (HUN)	Sergey Kovalenko (RUS)	Şeref Eroğlu (TUR)
2006 Moscow	Tamás Lőrincz (HUN)	Sergey Kovalenko (RUS)	Oleksandr Hvoşç (UKR)
2007 Sofia	Nikolay Gergov (BUL)	Oleksandr Khvoshch (UKR)	Marcus Thätner (GER)
2007 Sofia	Nikolay Gergov (BUL)	Oleksandr Khvoshch (UKR)	Refik Ayvazoğlu (TUR)
2008 Tampere	Armen Vardanyan (UKR)	Ion Panait (ROU)	Plamen Petrov (BUL)
2008 Tampere	Armen Vardanyan (UKR)	Ion Panait (ROU)	Ruslan Belkhoroev (RUS)
2009 Vilnius	Ambako Vachadze (RUS)	Mikhail Siamionau (BLR)	Sharur Vardanyan (SWE)
2009 Vilnius	Ambako Vachadze (RUS)	Mikhail Siamionau (BLR)	Manuchar Tskhadaia (GEO)
2010 Bakü	Ambako Vachadze (RUS)	Ion Panait (ROU)	Steeve Guénot (FRA)
2010 Bakü	Ambako Vachadze (RUS)	Ion Panait (ROU)	Tamás Lőrincz (HUN)
2011 Dortmund	Ambako Vachadze (RUS)	Tamás Lőrincz (HUN)	Vitaliy Rahimov (AZE)
2011 Dortmund	Ambako Vachadze (RUS)	Tamás Lőrincz (HUN)	Aleksandar Maksimović (SRB)
2012 Belgrad	Frank Stäbler (GER)	Georgian Carpen (ROU)	Aleksandar Maksimović (SRB)
2012 Belgrad	Frank Stäbler (GER)	Georgian Carpen (ROU)	Islambek Albiev (RUS)
2013 Tiflis	Tamás Lőrincz (HUN)	Adam Kurak (RUS)	Artak Margaryan (FRA)
2013 Tiflis	Tamás Lőrincz (HUN)	Adam Kurak (RUS)	Hasan Aliyev (AZE)
2014 Vantaa	Adam Kurak (RUS)	Hasan Aliyev (AZE)	Frank Stäbler (GER)
2014 Vantaa	Adam Kurak (RUS)	Hasan Aliyev (AZE)	Istvan Levai (SVK)
2015 Baku	Artem Surkov (RUS)	Migran Arutyunyan (ARM)	Hasan Aliyev (AZE)
2015 Baku	Artem Surkov (RUS)	Migran Arutyunyan (ARM)	Istvan Levai (SVK)
2016 Riga	Islambek Albiev (RUS)	Davor Štefanek (SRB)	Kamran Mammadov (AZE)
2016 Riga	Islambek Albiev (RUS)	Davor Štefanek (SRB)	Shmagi Bolkvadze (GEO)
2017 Novi Sad	Artem Surkov (RUS)	Davor Štefanek (SRB)	Goga Gogiberashvili (GEO)
2017 Novi Sad	Artem Surkov (RUS)	Davor Štefanek (SRB)	Soslan Daurov (BLR)
2018 Kaspiysk	Artem Surkov (RUS)	Shmagi Bolkvadze (GEO)	Karen Aslanyan (ARM)
2018 Kaspiysk	Artem Surkov (RUS)	Shmagi Bolkvadze (GEO)	Enes Başar (TUR)
2019 Bucharest	Atakan Yüksel (TUR)	Gevorg Sahakyan (POL)	Karen Aslanyan (ARM)
2019 Bucharest	Atakan Yüksel (TUR)	Gevorg Sahakyan (POL)	Artem Surkov (RUS)
2020 Rome	Morten Thoresen (NOR)	Nazir Abdullaev (RUS)	Kristupas Šleiva (LTU)
2020 Rome	Morten Thoresen (NOR)	Nazir Abdullaev (RUS)	Karen Aslanyan (ARM)
2021 Warsaw	Mate Nemeš (SRB)	Mateusz Bernatek (POL)	Slavik Galstyan (ARM)
2021 Warsaw	Mate Nemeš (SRB)	Mateusz Bernatek (POL)	Murat Fırat (TUR)
2022 Budapest	Murat Fırat (TUR)	István Váncza (HUN)	Slavik Galstyan (ARM)
2022 Budapest	Murat Fırat (TUR)	István Váncza (HUN)	Hasrat Jafarov (AZE)
2023 Zagreb	Hasrat Jafarov (AZE)	Joni Khetsuriani (GEO)	Parviz Nasibov (UKR)
2023 Zagreb	Hasrat Jafarov (AZE)	Joni Khetsuriani (GEO)	Haavard Joergensen (NOR)
2024 Bucharest	Hasrat Jafarov (AZE)	Ruslan Bichurin (ANA)	Abu Muslim Amaev (BUL)
2024 Bucharest	Hasrat Jafarov (AZE)	Ruslan Bichurin (ANA)	Murat Fırat (TUR)

== Light welterweight ==
- 71 kg: 2014–2017
- 72 kg: 2018–

Tournament	Gold	Silver	Bronze
2014 Vantaa	Tamas Lorincz (HUN)	Rasul Chunayev (AZE)	Yunus Özel (TUR)
2014 Vantaa	Tamas Lorincz (HUN)	Rasul Chunayev (AZE)	Aliaksandr Dzemyanovich (BLR)
2015 Baku	Rasul Chunayev (AZE)	Balint Korpasi (HUN)	Dominik Etlinger (CRO)
2015 Baku	Rasul Chunayev (AZE)	Balint Korpasi (HUN)	Frank Stäbler (GER)
2016 Riga	Varsham Boranyan (ARM)	Aleksandar Maksimović (SRB)	Hasan Aliyev (AZE)
2016 Riga	Varsham Boranyan (ARM)	Aleksandar Maksimović (SRB)	Balint Korpasi (HUN)
2017 Novi Sad	Balint Korpasi (HUN)	Pavel Liakh (BLR)	Abuyazid Mantsigov (RUS)
2017 Novi Sad	Balint Korpasi (HUN)	Pavel Liakh (BLR)	Aleksandar Maksimović (SRB)
2018 Kaspiysk	Adam Kurak (RUS)	Rasul Chunayev (AZE)	Daniel Cataraga (MDA)
2018 Kaspiysk	Adam Kurak (RUS)	Rasul Chunayev (AZE)	Balint Korpasi (HUN)
2019 Bucharest	Abuyazid Mantsigov (RUS)	Cengiz Arslan (TUR)	Aik Mnatsakanian (BUL)
2019 Bucharest	Abuyazid Mantsigov (RUS)	Cengiz Arslan (TUR)	Dominik Etlinger (CRO)
2020 Rome	Frank Stäbler (GER)	Iuri Lomadze (GEO)	Ulvu Ganizade (AZE)
2020 Rome	Frank Stäbler (GER)	Iuri Lomadze (GEO)	Selçuk Can (TUR)
2021 Warsaw	Shmagi Bolkvadze (GEO)	Malkhas Amoyan (ARM)	Maksym Yevtushenko (UKR)
2021 Warsaw	Shmagi Bolkvadze (GEO)	Malkhas Amoyan (ARM)	Róbert Fritsch (HUN)
2022 Budapest	Róbert Fritsch (HUN)	Shmagi Bolkvadze (GEO)	Ulvu Ganizade (AZE)
2022 Budapest	Róbert Fritsch (HUN)	Shmagi Bolkvadze (GEO)	Ali Arsalan (SRB)
2023 Zagreb	Ulvu Ganizade (AZE)	Ibrahim Ghanem (FRA)	Selçuk Can (TUR)
2023 Zagreb	Ulvu Ganizade (AZE)	Ibrahim Ghanem (FRA)	Kamil Czarnecki (POL)
2024 Bucharest	Selçuk Can (TUR)	Ulvu Ganizade (AZE)	Narek Oganian (ANA)
2024 Bucharest	Selçuk Can (TUR)	Ulvu Ganizade (AZE)	Parviz Nasibov (UKR)

== Welterweight ==
- 73 kg: 1950–1961
- 78 kg: 1962–1967
- 74 kg: 1969–1995
- 76 kg: 1997–2001
- 74 kg: 2002–2013
- 75 kg: 2014–2017
- 77 kg: 2018–

Tournament	Gold	Silver	Bronze
1947 Prag	Yaşar Doğu (TUR)	Gösta Andersson (SWE)	Vyaçeslav Kojarskiy (URS)
1966 Essen	Vladislav Ivlev (URS)	Martti Laakso (FIN)	Ali Kazan (TUR)
1967 Minsk	Sırrı Acar (TUR)	Ion Ţăranu (ROU)	Georgy Vershinin (URS)
1968 Västerås	Sırrı Acar (TUR)	Milan Nenadić (YUG)	Vladislav Ivlev (YUG)
1969 Modena	Eero Tapio (FIN)	Momir Kecman (YUG)	Jan Karlsson (SWE)
1970 East Berlin	Viktor Igumenov (URS)	Momir Kecman (YUG)	Franz Berger (AUT)
1972 Katowice	Petros Galaktopoulos (GRE)	Kasim Djalilov (URS)	Vítězslav Mácha (TCH)
1973 Helsinki	Ivan Kolev (BUL)	Vítězslav Mácha (TCH)	Klaus-Peter Göpfert (GDR)
1974 Madrid	Ivan Kolev (BUL)	Vítězslav Mácha (TCH)	Iosif Berishvili (URS)
1975 Ludwigshafen	Jan Karlsson (SWE)	Klaus-Peter Göpfert (GDR)	Vítězslav Mácha (TCH)
1976 Leningrad	Yanko Shopov (BUL)	Iosif Berishvili (URS)	Petros Galaktopoulos (GRE)
1977 Bursa	Vítězslav Mácha (TCH)	Klaus-Peter Göpfert (GDR)	Yanko Shopov (BUL)
1978 Sofia	Ferenc Kocsis (HUN)	Anatoly Bykov (URS)	Yanko Shopov (BUL)
1979 Bucharest	Ferenc Kocsis (HUN)	Viacheslav Mkrtychev (URS)	Nedko Nedev (BUL)
1980 Prievidza	Nedko Nedev (BUL)	Mikko Huhtala (FIN)	Viacheslav Mkrtychev (URS)
1981 Lodz	Ferenc Kocsis (HUN)	Vladimir Galkin (URS)	Andrzej Supron (POL)
1982 Varna	Andrzej Supron (POL)	Roger Tallroth (SWE)	Karolj Kasap (YUG)
1983 Budapest	Ferenc Kocsis (HUN)	Andrzej Supron (POL)	Ştefan Rusu (ROU)
1984 Jönköping	Roger Tallroth (SWE)	Borislav Velichkov (BUL)	Mikhail Mamiashvili (URS)
1985 Leipzig	Ştefan Rusu (ROU)	Borislav Velichkov (BUL)	Mikhail Mamiashvili (URS)
1986 Piraeus	Mikhail Mamiashvili (URS)	Roger Tallroth (SWE)	Jouko Salomäki (FIN)
1987 Tampere	Daulet Turlykhanov (URS)	Jouko Salomäki (FIN)	Dobri Ivanov (BUL)
1988 Kolbotn	Bisolt Detsiyev (URS)	Jaroslav Zeman (TCH)	János Takács (HUN)
1989 Oulu	Petar Tenev (BUL)	Torbjörn Kornbakk (SWE)	Jaroslav Zeman (TCH)
1990 Poznan	Torbjörn Kornbakk (SWE)	Tuomo Karila (FIN)	Jaroslav Zeman (TCH)
1991 Aschaffenburg	Mnatsakan Iskandaryan (URS)	Tuomo Karila (FIN)	Torbjörn Kornbakk (SWE)
1992 Kopenhag	Mnatsakan Iskandaryan (CIS)	Yvon Riemer (FRA)	Erhan Balcı (TUR)
1993 İstanbul	Beslan Chaguiyev (RUS)	Esad Aliyev (AZE)	Stoyan Stoyanov (BUL)
1994 Athens	Erol Koyuncu (TUR)	Vladimir Kopytov (BLR)	Torbjörn Kornbakk (SWE)
1995 Besançon	Stoyan Stoyanov (BUL)	Mircea Constantin (ROU)	Vladimir Kopytov (BLR)
1996 Budapest	Nazmi Avluca (TUR)	Vladimir Kopytov (BLR)	Erik Hahn (GER)
1997 Kouvola	Torbjörn Kornbakk (SWE)	Marko Asell (FIN)	Yvon Riemer (FRA)
1998 Minsk	Murat Kardanov (RUS)	Xviça Biçinaşvili (GEO)	Nazmi Avluca (TUR)
1999 Sofia	Stoyan Stoyanov (BUL)	Tamás Berzicza (HUN)	Dimitrios Avramis (GRE)
2000 Moscow	Viachaslau Makaranka (BLR)	David Manukyan (UKR)	Murat Kardanov (RUS)
2001 İstanbul	Aleksey Mishin (RUS)	Ara Abrahamian (SWE)	Nazmi Avluca (TUR)
2002 Seinäjoki	Badri Khasaia (GEO)	Varteres Samurgashev (RUS)	Marko Yli-Hannuksela (FIN)
2003 Belgrad	Aleksey Glushkov (RUS)	Aliaksandr Kikiniou (BLR)	Serkan Özden (TUR)
2004 Haparanda	Mikhail Ivanchenko (RUS)	Vasyl Rachyba (UKR)	Aleh Mikhalovich (BLR)
2005 Varna	Movses Karapetyan (ARM)	Velin Marinov (BUL)	Neven Žugaj (CRO)
2005 Varna	Movses Karapetyan (ARM)	Velin Marinov (BUL)	Adam Juretzko (GER)
2006 Moscow	Varteres Samurgashev (RUS)	Aleh Mikhalovich (BLR)	Manuchar Kvirkvelia (GEO)
2006 Moscow	Varteres Samurgashev (RUS)	Aleh Mikhalovich (BLR)	Mahmut Altay (TUR)
2007 Sofia	Manuchar Kvirkvelia (GEO)	Reto Bucher (SUI)	Mikhail Ivanchenko (RUS)
2007 Sofia	Manuchar Kvirkvelia (GEO)	Reto Bucher (SUI)	Valdemaras Venckaitis (LTU)
2008 Tampere	Péter Bácsi (HUN)	Şeref Tüfenk (TUR)	Christophe Guenot (FRA)
2008 Tampere	Péter Bácsi (HUN)	Şeref Tüfenk (TUR)	Evgeni Popov (RUS)
2009 Vilnius	Arsen Julfalakyan (ARM)	Volodymyr Shatskykh (UKR)	Selçuk Çebi (TUR)
2009 Vilnius	Arsen Julfalakyan (ARM)	Volodymyr Shatskykh (UKR)	Aliaksandr Kikiniou (BLR)
2010 Bakü	Aliaksandr Kikiniou (BLR)	Elvin Mursaliyev (AZE)	Dmytro Pyshkov (UKR)
2010 Bakü	Aliaksandr Kikiniou (BLR)	Elvin Mursaliyev (AZE)	Péter Bácsi (HUN)
2011 Dortmund	Rafig Huseynov (AZE)	Péter Bácsi (HUN)	Roman Vlasov (RUS)
2011 Dortmund	Rafig Huseynov (AZE)	Péter Bácsi (HUN)	Christophe Guenot (FRA)
2012 Belgrad	Roman Vlasov (RUS)	Manuchar Tskhadaia (GEO)	Aleksandr Kazakevič (LTU)
2012 Belgrad	Roman Vlasov (RUS)	Manuchar Tskhadaia (GEO)	Arsen Julfalakyan (ARM)
2013 Tiflis	Roman Vlasov (RUS)	Zurabi Datunashvili (GEO)	Bozo Starcevic (CRO)
2013 Tiflis	Roman Vlasov (RUS)	Zurabi Datunashvili (GEO)	Yavor Yanakiev (BUL)
2014 Vantaa	Alexander Chekhirkin (RUS)	Arsen Julfalakyan (ARM)	Elvin Mursaliyev (AZE)
2014 Vantaa	Alexander Chekhirkin (RUS)	Arsen Julfalakyan (ARM)	Mark Madsen (DEN)
2015 Baku	Elvin Mursaliyev (AZE)	Viktor Nemeš (SRB)	Chingiz Labazanov (RUS)
2015 Baku	Elvin Mursaliyev (AZE)	Viktor Nemeš (SRB)	Dmytro Pyshkov (UKR)
2016 Riga	Zurab Datunashvili (GEO)	Viktor Nemeš (SRB)	László Szabó (HUN)
2016 Riga	Zurab Datunashvili (GEO)	Viktor Nemeš (SRB)	Karapet Chalyan (ARM)
2017 Novi Sad	Tarek Abdelslam (BUL)	Chingiz Labazanov (RUS)	Kazbek Kilou (BLR)
2017 Novi Sad	Tarek Abdelslam (BUL)	Chingiz Labazanov (RUS)	Tamás Lőrincz (HUN)
2018 Kaspiysk	Roman Vlasov (RUS)	Viktor Nemeš (SRB)	Elvin Mursaliyev (AZE)
2018 Kaspiysk	Roman Vlasov (RUS)	Viktor Nemeš (SRB)	Tamás Lőrincz (HUN)
2019 Bucharest	Roman Vlasov (RUS)	Roland Schwarz (GER)	Viktor Nemeš (SRB)
2019 Bucharest	Roman Vlasov (RUS)	Roland Schwarz (GER)	Arsen Julfalakyan (ARM)
2020 Rome	Sanan Suleymanov (AZE)	Zoltán Lévai (HUN)	Alex Kessidis (SWE)
2020 Rome	Sanan Suleymanov (AZE)	Zoltán Lévai (HUN)	Karapet Chalyan (ARM)
2021 Warsaw	Tamás Lőrincz (HUN)	Yunus Emre Başar (TUR)	Sanan Suleymanov (AZE)
2021 Warsaw	Tamás Lőrincz (HUN)	Yunus Emre Başar (TUR)	Antonio Kamenjašević (CRO)
2022 Budapest	Malkhas Amoyan (ARM)	Yunus Emre Başar (TUR)	Sanan Suleymanov (AZE)
2022 Budapest	Malkhas Amoyan (ARM)	Yunus Emre Başar (TUR)	Aik Mnatsakanian (BUL)
2023 Zagreb	Malkhas Amoyan (ARM)	Viktor Nemeš (SRB)	Yunus Emre Başar (TUR)
2023 Zagreb	Malkhas Amoyan (ARM)	Viktor Nemeš (SRB)	Zoltán Lévai (HUN)
2024 Bucharest	Malkhas Amoyan (ARM)	Yunus Emre Başar (TUR)	Iuri Lomadze (GEO)
2024 Bucharest	Malkhas Amoyan (ARM)	Yunus Emre Başar (TUR)	Adlet Tiuliubaev (ANA)

== Light middleweight ==
- 80 kg: 2014–2017
- 82 kg: 2018–

Tournament	Gold	Silver	Bronze
2014 Vantaa	Péter Bácsi (HUN)	Selçuk Çebi (TUR)	Giorgi Tsirekidze (GEO)
2014 Vantaa	Péter Bácsi (HUN)	Selçuk Çebi (TUR)	Oleksandr Shyshman (UKR)
2015 Baku	Evgeny Saleev (RUS)	Rafig Huseynov (AZE)	Daniel Aleksandrov (BUL)
2015 Baku	Evgeny Saleev (RUS)	Rafig Huseynov (AZE)	Viktar Sasunouski (BLR)
2016 Riga	Pascal Eisele (GER)	Edgar Babayan (POL)	Aslan Atem (TUR)
2016 Riga	Pascal Eisele (GER)	Edgar Babayan (POL)	Daniel Aleksandrov (BUL)
2017 Novi Sad	Zurab Datunashvili (GEO)	Radzik Kuliyeu (BLR)	Aslan Atem (TUR)
2017 Novi Sad	Zurab Datunashvili (GEO)	Radzik Kuliyeu (BLR)	Adlan Akiev (RUS)
2018 Kaspiysk	Maksim Manukyan (ARM)	Viktar Sasunouski (BLR)	Daniel Aleksandrov (BUL)
2018 Kaspiysk	Maksim Manukyan (ARM)	Viktar Sasunouski (BLR)	Rafig Huseynov (AZE)
2019 Bucharest	Rajbek Bisultanov (DEN)	Lasha Gobadze (GEO)	Aleksandr Komarov (RUS)
2019 Bucharest	Rajbek Bisultanov (DEN)	Lasha Gobadze (GEO)	Emrah Kuş (TUR)
2020 Rome	Rafig Huseynov (AZE)	Daniel Aleksandrov (BUL)	Bogdan Kourinnoi (SWE)
2020 Rome	Rafig Huseynov (AZE)	Daniel Aleksandrov (BUL)	Hannes Wagner (GER)
2021 Warsaw	Adlan Akiev (RUS)	Radzik Kuliyeu (BLR)	Hannes Wagner (GER)
2021 Warsaw	Adlan Akiev (RUS)	Radzik Kuliyeu (BLR)	Aivengo Rikadze (GEO)
2022 Budapest	Rafig Huseynov (AZE)	Gela Bolkvadze (GEO)	Burhan Akbudak (TUR)
2022 Budapest	Rafig Huseynov (AZE)	Gela Bolkvadze (GEO)	Tamás Lévai (HUN)
2023 Zagreb	Burhan Akbudak (TUR)	Yaroslav Filchakov (UKR)	Roland Schwarz (GER)
2023 Zagreb	Burhan Akbudak (TUR)	Yaroslav Filchakov (UKR)	Filip Šačić (CRO)
2024 Bucharest	Alperen Berber (TUR)	Islam Aliev (ANA)	Gela Bolkvadze (GEO)
2024 Bucharest	Alperen Berber (TUR)	Islam Aliev (ANA)	Yaroslav Filchakov (UKR)

== Middleweight ==
- 75 kg: 1904
- 80 kg: 1905
- 85 kg: 1907
- 75 kg: 1908–1909
- 70 kg: 1910
- 73 kg: 1911
- 75 kg: 1913–1922
- 79 kg: 1950–1961
- 87 kg: 1962–1967
- 82 kg: 1969–1995
- 85 kg: 1997–2001
- 84 kg: 2002–2013
- 85 kg: 2014–2017
- 87 kg: 2018–

Tournament	Gold	Silver	Bronze
1911 Budapest	Mihály Grozescu (Austria-Hungary)	József Sugár (Austria-Hungary)	Mihály Csapitzky (Austria-Hungary)
1921 Offenbach	Heinrich Ketzer (GER)	Philipp Heß (GER)	Sittig (GER)
1924 Neunkirchen	Friedrich Bräun (GER)	Heinrich Stiefel (GER)	Julius Conter (GER)
1925 Milano	Friedrich Bräun (GER)	Väinö Kokkinen (FIN)	Mario Gruppioni (ITA)
1926 Riga	Johannes Jacobsen (DEN)	Friedrich Bräun (GER)	László Papp (HUN)
1927 Budapest	László Papp (HUN)	Albert Kusnets (EST)	František Hála (TCH)
1929 Dortmund	József Tunyogi (HUN)	Väinö Kokkinen (FIN)	Ivar Johansson (SWE)
1930 Stockholm	Väinö Kokkinen (FIN)	Ivar Johansson (SWE)	Karl Kullisaar (EST)
1931 Prag	Ivar Johansson (SWE)	Väinö Kokkinen (FIN)	Viktors Kavals (LAT)
1933 Helsinki	Axel Cadier (SWE)	Jean Földeák (GER)	Edvard Westerlund (FIN)
1934 Rome	Ivar Johansson (SWE)	August Neo (EST)	László Papp (HUN)
1935 Kopenhag	Ivar Johansson (SWE)	Josef Paar (GER)	Béchir Bouazzat (FRA)
1937 Paris	Ivar Johansson (SWE)	Ludwig Schweickert (GER)	Voldemar Mägi (EST)
1938 Tallinn	Ivar Johansson (SWE)	Georgs Ozolinš (LAT)	Voldemar Roolaan (EST)
1939 Oslo	Ivar Johansson (SWE)	Ludwig Schweickert (GER)	Arvi Pikkusaari (FIN)
1947 Prag	Konstantin Koberidze (URS)	Gyula Kovács (HUN)	Karl-Johan Wong (SWE)
1966 Essen	Tevfik Kış (TUR)	Anatoli Kirov (URS)	Stig Persson (SWE)
1967 Minsk	Aleksandr Yurkeviç (URS)	Lothar Metz (FRG)	Gheorghe Popovici (ROU)
1968 Västerås	Omar Bliadze (URS)	Petar Krumov (BUL)	Jiří Kormaník (TCH)
1969 Modena	Milan Nenadić (YUG)	Jan Kårström (SWE)	Martti Laakso (FIN)
1970 East Berlin	Milan Nenadić (YUG)	Adam Ostrowski (POL)	Rudolf Vesper (GDR)
1972 Katowice	Anatoly Nazarenko (URS)	Ion Draica (ROU)	Miroslav Janota (TCH)
1973 Helsinki	Gennady Korban (URS)	Jan Dołgowicz (POL)	Pavel Pavlov (BUL)
1974 Madrid	Anatoly Nazarenko (URS)	Werner Schröter (FRG)	André Bouchoule (FRA)
1975 Ludwigshafen	Vladimir Cheboksarov (URS)	Ion Draica (ROU)	André Bouchoule (FRA)
1976 Leningrad	Csaba Hegedűs (HUN)	Vladimir Cheboksarov (URS)	Ivan Kolev (BUL)
1977 Bursa	Ion Draica (ROU)	Savo Hristov (BUL)	Anatoliy Nazarenko (URS)
1978 Sofia	Ion Draica (ROU)	Jan Dołgowicz (POL)	Savo Hristov (BUL)
1979 Bucharest	Ion Draica (ROU)	Jan Dołgowicz (POL)	Teimuraz Apjazava (URS)
1980 Prievidza	Gennady Korban (URS)	Leif Andersson (SWE)	Pavel Pavlov (BUL)
1981 Lodz	Gennady Korban (URS)	Jan Dołgowicz (POL)	Pavel Pavlov (BUL)
1982 Varna	Aslan Zhanimov (URS)	Andrzej Malina (POL)	Ion Draica (ROU)
1983 Budapest	Teimuraz Apjazava (URS)	Ion Draica (ROU)	Andrzej Malina (POL)
1984 Jönköping	Teimuraz Apjazava (URS)	Anguel Bonchev (BUL)	Jarmo Övermark (FIN)
1985 Leipzig	Abdulbasir Battalov (URS)	Tibor Komáromi (HUN)	Sorin Herțea (ROU)
1986 Piraeus	Tibor Komáromi (HUN)	Bogdan Daras (POL)	Teimuraz Apjazava (URS)
1987 Tampere	Sergey Nasevich (URS)	Bogdan Daras (POL)	Tibor Komáromi (HUN)
1988 Kolbotn	Mikhail Mamiashvili (URS)	Tibor Komáromi (HUN)	Timo Niemi (FIN)
1989 Oulu	Mikhail Mamiashvili (URS)	Piotr Stępień (POL)	Olaf Koschnitzke (GDR)
1990 Poznan	Thomas Zander (GER)	Sergey Nasevich (URS)	Todor Anguelov (BUL)
1991 Aschaffenburg	Péter Farkas (HUN)	Pavel Frinta (TCH)	Thomas Zander (GER)
1992 Kopenhag	Thomas Zander (GER)	Magnus Fredriksson (SWE)	Goran Kasum (YUG)
1993 İstanbul	Thomas Zander (GER)	Hamza Yerlikaya (TUR)	Murat Kardanov (RUS)
1994 Athens	Thomas Zander (GER)	Gocha Tsitsiashvili (ISR)	Sergey Nasevich (RUS)
1995 Besançon	Sergey Tsvir (RUS)	Hristo Stanchev (BUL)	Gocha Tsitsiashvili (ISR)
1996 Budapest	Hamza Yerlikaya (TUR)	Péter Farkas (HUN)	Gocha Tsitsiashvili (ISR)
1997 Kouvola	Hamza Yerlikaya (TUR)	Thomas Zander (GER)	Aleksandar Jovančević (YUG)
1998 Minsk	Hamza Yerlikaya (TUR)	Sergey Tsvir (RUS)	Martin Lidberg (SWE)
1999 Sofia	Hamza Yerlikaya (TUR)	Martin Lidberg (SWE)	Aleksandr Menshchikov (RUS)
2000 Moscow	Martin Lidberg (SWE)	Andrey Batura (BLR)	Aleksandr Menshchikov (RUS)
2001 İstanbul	Hamza Yerlikaya (TUR)	Marcin Letki (POL)	Oleksandr Daragan (UKR)
2002 Seinäjoki	Hamza Yerlikaya (TUR)	Ara Abrahamian (SWE)	Viachaslau Makaranka (BLR)
2003 Belgrad	Aleksey Mishin (RUS)	Levon Geghamyan (ARM)	Mukhran Vakhtangadze (GEO)
2004 Haparanda	Nazmi Avluca (TUR)	Dimitrios Avramis (GRE)	Sándor Bárdosi (HUN)
2005 Varna	Aleksey Mishin (RUS)	Serkan Özden (TUR)	Laimutis Adomaitis (LTU)
2005 Varna	Aleksey Mishin (RUS)	Serkan Özden (TUR)	Badri Khasaia (GEO)
2006 Moscow	Artur Michalkiewicz (POL)	Denis Forov (ARM)	Melonin Noumonvi (FRA)
2006 Moscow	Artur Michalkiewicz (POL)	Denis Forov (ARM)	Nazmi Avluca (TUR)
2007 Sofia	Aleksey Mishin (RUS)	Jan Fischer (GER)	Andrea Minguzzi (ITA)
2007 Sofia	Aleksey Mishin (RUS)	Jan Fischer (GER)	Melonin Noumonvi (FRA)
2008 Tampere	Nazmi Avluca (TUR)	Badri Khasaia (GEO)	Ara Abrahamian (SWE)
2008 Tampere	Nazmi Avluca (TUR)	Badri Khasaia (GEO)	Andrea Minguzzi (ITA)
2009 Vilnius	Aleksey Mishin (RUS)	Nazmi Avluca (TUR)	Vitaliy Lishchynskyy (UKR)
2009 Vilnius	Aleksey Mishin (RUS)	Nazmi Avluca (TUR)	Shalva Gadabadze (AZE)
2010 Bakü	Nazmi Avluca (TUR)	Aleksey Mishin (RUS)	Melonin Noumonvi (FRA)
2010 Bakü	Nazmi Avluca (TUR)	Aleksey Mishin (RUS)	Jan Fischer (GER)
2011 Dortmund	Vasyl Rachyba (UKR)	Alan Khugaev (RUS)	Artur Shahinyan (ARM)
2011 Dortmund	Vasyl Rachyba (UKR)	Alan Khugaev (RUS)	Hristo Marinov (BUL)
2012 Belgrad	Hristo Marinov (BUL)	Damian Janikowski (POL)	Zhan Beleniuk (UKR)
2012 Belgrad	Hristo Marinov (BUL)	Damian Janikowski (POL)	Viktor Lőrincz (HUN)
2013 Tiflis	Aleksey Mishin (RUS)	Vladimer Gegeshidze (GEO)	Artur Shahinyan (ARM)
2013 Tiflis	Aleksey Mishin (RUS)	Vladimer Gegeshidze (GEO)	Nenad Zugaj (CRO)
2014 Vantaa	Zhan Beleniuk (UKR)	Rami Hietaniemi (FIN)	Damian Janikowski (POL)
2014 Vantaa	Zhan Beleniuk (UKR)	Rami Hietaniemi (FIN)	Amer Hrustanović (AUT)
2015 Baku	Davit Chakvetadze (RUS)	Zhan Beleniuk (UKR)	Metehan Başar (TUR)
2015 Baku	Davit Chakvetadze (RUS)	Zhan Beleniuk (UKR)	Ramsin Azizsir (GER)
2016 Riga	Zhan Beleniuk (UKR)	Robert Kobliashvili (GEO)	Tadeusz Michalik (POL)
2016 Riga	Zhan Beleniuk (UKR)	Robert Kobliashvili (GEO)	Denis Kudla (GER)
2017 Novi Sad	Viktor Lőrincz (HUN)	Metehan Başar (TUR)	Nikolay Bayryakov (BUL)
2017 Novi Sad	Viktor Lőrincz (HUN)	Metehan Başar (TUR)	Ramsin Azizsir (GER)
2018 Kaspiysk	Robert Kobliashvili (GEO)	Bekkhan Ozdoev (RUS)	Zakarias Berg (SWE)
2018 Kaspiysk	Robert Kobliashvili (GEO)	Bekkhan Ozdoev (RUS)	Denis Kudla (GER)
2019 Bucharest	Zhan Beleniuk (UKR)	Islam Abbasov (AZE)	Erik Szilvássy (HUN)
2019 Bucharest	Zhan Beleniuk (UKR)	Islam Abbasov (AZE)	Denis Kudla (GER)
2020 Rome	Semen Novikov (UKR)	Viktor Lőrincz (HUN)	Aleksandr Komarov (RUS)
2020 Rome	Semen Novikov (UKR)	Viktor Lőrincz (HUN)	Islam Abbasov (AZE)
2021 Warsaw	Zurab Datunashvili (SRB)	Kiryl Maskevich (BLR)	Milad Alirzaev (RUS)
2021 Warsaw	Zurab Datunashvili (SRB)	Kiryl Maskevich (BLR)	Zhan Beleniuk (UKR)
2022 Budapest	Turpal Bisultanov (DEN)	Nicu Ojog (ROU)	Islam Abbasov (AZE)
2022 Budapest	Turpal Bisultanov (DEN)	Nicu Ojog (ROU)	Robert Kobliashvili (GEO)
2023 Zagreb	István Takács (HUN)	Ali Cengiz (TUR)	Semen Novikov (BUL)
2023 Zagreb	István Takács (HUN)	Ali Cengiz (TUR)	Lasha Gobadze (GEO)
2024 Bucharest	Aleksandr Komarov (SRB)	Ali Cengiz (TUR)	Kiryl Maskevich (ANA)
2024 Bucharest	Aleksandr Komarov (SRB)	Ali Cengiz (TUR)	Zhan Beleniuk (UKR)

== Light heavyweight ==
- 85 kg: 1910
- 83 kg: 1911
- 82.5 kg: 1913–1922
- 87 kg: 1950–1961
- 97 kg: 1962–1967
- 90 kg: 1969–1995

Tournament	Gold	Silver	Bronze
1911 Budapest	Harald Christensen (DEN)	József Maróthy (Austria-Hungary)	János Hudák (Austria-Hungary)
1921 Offenbach	Wilhelm Knöpfle (GER)	Fritz Kärcher (GER)	Max Dreifuss (GER)
1924 Neunkirchen	Emil Bräuer (GER)	Julius Baruch (GER)	Jakob Bohrer (GER)
1925 Milano	Carl Westergren (SWE)	Robert Rupp (GER)	László Papp (HUN)
1926 Riga	Robert Rupp (GER)	Rudolf Loo (EST)	Aleksander Szabó (TCH)
1927 Budapest	Alexander Szabó (TCH)	Thure Sjöstedt (SWE)	Rudolf Loo (EST)
1929 Dortmund	Onni Pellinen (FIN)	Robert Rupp (GER)	Sanfried Söderqvist (SWE)
1930 Stockholm	Carl Westergren (SWE)	Ejnar Hansen (DEN)	Edil Rosenqvist (FIN)
1931 Prag	Onni Pellinen (FIN)	Rudolf Svensson (SWE)	Anton Vogedes (GER)
1933 Helsinki	Rudolf Svensson (SWE)	Väinö Kokkinen (FIN)	Olaf Luiga (EST)
1934 Rome	Edvīns Bietags (LAT)	Erich Siebert (GER)	František Mráček (TCH)
1935 Kopenhag	Axel Cadier (SWE)	Paul Böhmer (GER)	August Neo (EST)
1937 Paris	Axel Cadier (SWE)	Nikolai Karklin (EST)	Werner Seelenbinder (GER)
1938 Tallinn	Axel Cadier (SWE)	Nikolai Karklin (EST)	Werner Seelenbinder (GER)
1939 Oslo	Nils Åkerlindh (SWE)	Mustafa Çakmak (TUR)	August Neo (EST)
1947 Prag	Konstantin Koberidze (URS)	Gyula Kovács (HUN)	Pauli Riihimäki (FIN)
1966 Essen	Nicolae Martinescu (ROU)	Alexei Karmatski (URS)	Pelle Svensson (SWE)
1967 Minsk	Ferenc Kiss (HUN)	Vasili Merkulov (URS)	Pelle Svensson (SWE)
1968 Västerås	Ferenc Kiss (HUN)	Boyan Radev (BUL)	Pelle Svensson (SWE)
1969 Modena	Josip Čorak (YUG)	Tore Hem (NOR)	Roland Andersson (SWE)
1970 East Berlin	Valery Rezantsev (URS)	Lothar Metz (GDR)	Josip Čorak (YUG)
1972 Katowice	Stoyan Nikolov (BUL)	Omar Bliadze (URS)	Darko Nišavić (YUG)
1973 Helsinki	Frank Andersson (SWE)	Dimitar Ivanov (BUL)	Keijo Manni (FIN)
1974 Madrid	Valery Rezantsev (URS)	Dieter Heuer (GDR)	Vasile Fodorpataki (ROU)
1975 Ludwigshafen	Georgi Raykov (BUL)	Vladimir Nechayev (URS)	Dieter Heuer (GDR)
1976 Leningrad	Frank Andersson (SWE)	Stoyan İvanov (BUL)	Fred Theobald (FRG)
1977 Bursa	Csaba Hegedűs (HUN)	Frank Andersson (SWE)	Airapet Minasian (URS)
1978 Sofia	Frank Andersson (SWE)	Keijo Manni (FIN)	Petre Dicu (ROU)
1979 Bucharest	Frank Andersson (SWE)	Norbert Növényi (HUN)	Petre Dicu (ROU)
1980 Prievidza	Igor Kanyguin (URS)	Frank Andersson (SWE)	Stoyan Ivanov (BUL)
1981 Lodz	Frank Andersson (SWE)	Alexandr Dubrovski (URS)	Yeoryos Pozidis (GRE)
1982 Varna	Igor Kanyguin (URS)	Frank Andersson (SWE)	Atanas Komchev (BUL)
1983 Budapest	Igor Kanyguin (URS)	Atanas Komchev (BUL)	Ilie Matei (ROU)
1984 Jönköping	Atanas Komchev (BUL)	Igor Kanyguin (URS)	Yeoryos Pozidis (GRE)
1985 Leipzig	Igor Kanyguin (URS)	Ilie Matei (ROU)	Toni Hannula (FIN)
1986 Piraeus	Atanas Komchev (BUL)	Franz Pitschmann (AUT)	Ilie Matei (ROU)
1987 Tampere	Vladimir Popov (URS)	Atanas Komchev (BUL)	Harri Koskela (FIN)
1988 Kolbotn	Ivaylo Yordanov (BUL)	Sándor Major (HUN)	Pavel Potapov (URS)
1989 Oulu	Vladimir Popov (URS)	Maik Bullmann (GDR)	Andreas Steinbach (FRG)
1990 Poznan	Pavel Potapov (URS)	Marek Kraszewski (POL)	Tibor Komáromi (HUN)
1991 Aschaffenburg	Pavel Potapov (URS)	Ivaylo Yordanov (BUL)	Tibor Komáromi (HUN)
1992 Kopenhag	Maik Bullmann (GER)	Ivaylo Yordanov (BUL)	Tibor Komáromi (HUN)
1993 İstanbul	Jörgen Olsson (SWE)	Ali Mollov (BUL)	Hakkı Başar (TUR)
1994 Athens	Vyacheslav Oliynyk (UKR)	Sergey Kirilchuk (BLR)	Stig Kleven (NOR)
1995 Besançon	Gogi Koguashvili (RUS)	Maik Bullmann (GER)	Vyacheslav Oliynyk (UKR)

== Heavyweight ==
- +75 kg: 1904
- +80 kg: 1905
- +85 kg: 1907
- +75 kg: 1908–1909
- +85 kg: 1910
- +83 kg: 1911
- +82.5 kg: 1913–1922
- +87 kg: 1950–1961
- +97 kg: 1962–1967
- 100 kg: 1969–1995
- 97 kg: 1997–2001
- 96 kg: 2002–2013
- 98 kg: 2014–2017
- 97 kg: 2018–

Tournament	Gold	Silver	Bronze
1911 Budapest	Rudolf Grüneisen (GER)	Søren Marinus Jensen (DEN)	József Előd (Austria-Hungary)
1921 Offenbach	Karl Döppel (GER)	Adolf Kurz (GER)	Hans Köstner (GER)
1924 Neunkirchen	Ferdinand Muss (GER)	Karl Rostock (GER)	Willi Presper (GER)
1925 Milano	Rudolf Svensson (SWE)	Rajmund Badó (HUN)	Edmond Dame (FRA)
1926 Riga	Georg Gehring (GER)	Josef Urban (TCH)	Johan Richthoff (SWE)
1927 Budapest	Rajmund Badó (HUN)	Johan Richthoff (SWE)	Josef Urban (TCH)
1929 Dortmund	Georg Gehring (GER)	Rudolf Svensson (SWE)	Josef Urban (TCH)
1930 Stockholm	Johan Richthoff (SWE)	Hjalmar Nyström (FIN)	Georg Gehring (GER)
1931 Prag	Carl Westergren (SWE)	Hjalmar Nyström (FIN)	Georg Gehring (GER)
1933 Helsinki	Kurt Hornfischer (GER)	Arvo Niemelä (FIN)	Carl Westergren (SWE)
1934 Rome	Kurt Hornfischer (GER)	Rudolf Svensson (SWE)	Alberts Zvejnieks (LAT)
1935 Kopenhag	Kurt Hornfischer (GER)	Hjalmar Nyström (FIN)	Alberts Zvejnieks (LAT)
1937 Paris	Kristjan Palusalu (EST)	John Nyman (SWE)	Josef Klapuch (TCH)
1938 Tallinn	Johannes Kotkas (EST)	John Nyman (SWE)	Mehmet Çoban (TUR)
1939 Oslo	Johannes Kotkas (EST)	John Nyman (SWE)	Gyula Bóbis (HUN)
1947 Prag	Johannes Kotkas (URS)	Mustafa Çakmak (TUR)	Pauli Riihimäki (FIN)
1966 Essen	Anatoly Roshchin (URS)	István Kozma (HUN)	Petr Kment (CZE)
1967 Minsk	István Kozma (HUN)	Nikolai Shmakov (URS)	Petr Kment (CZE)
1968 Västerås	Petr Kment (CZE)	István Kozma (HUN)	Ragnar Svensson (SWE)
1969 Modena	Pelle Svensson (SWE)	Aimo Mäenpää (FIN)	Alfons Hecher (FRG)
1970 East Berlin	Pelle Svensson (SWE)	Ferenc Kiss (HUN)	Marin Kolev (BUL)
1972 Katowice	Nikolay Yakovenko (URS)	Nicolae Martinescu (ROU)	Andrzej Skrzydlewski (POL)
1973 Helsinki	Nikolay Balboshin (URS)	Kamen Goranov (BUL)	Nicolae Martinescu (ROU)
1974 Madrid	Kamen Goranov (BUL)	Nikolay Balboshin (URS)	Fredi Albrecht (GDR)
1975 Ludwigshafen	Nikolay Balboshin (URS)	Fredi Albrecht (GDR)	József Farkas (HUN)
1976 Leningrad	Nikolay Balboshin (URS)	József Farkas (HUN)	Tore Hem (NOR)
1977 Bursa	Nikolay Balboshin (URS)	Georgi Raykov (BUL)	Andrzej Skrzydlewski (POL)
1978 Sofia	Nikolay Balboshin (URS)	Georgi Raykov (BUL)	József Farkas (HUN)
1979 Bucharest	Nikolay Balboshin (URS)	Roman Bierła (POL)	Vasile Andrei (ROU)
1980 Prievidza	Georgi Raykov (BUL)	Vasile Andrei (ROU)	József Farkas (HUN)
1981 Lodz	Nikolai Inkov (URS)	Andrey Dimitrov (BUL)	Christer Gulldén (SWE)
1982 Varna	Andrey Dimitrov (BUL)	Nikolai Inkov (URS)	Jožef Tertelj (YUG)
1983 Budapest	Andrey Dimitrov (BUL)	Tamás Gáspár (HUN)	Viktor Avdyshev (URS)
1984 Jönköping	Tamás Gáspár (HUN)	Thomas Horschel (GDR)	Nikolay Balboshin (URS)
1985 Leipzig	Anatoli Fedorenko (URS)	Ilia Vasilev (BUL)	Dušan Masár (TCH)
1986 Piraeus	Jožef Tertelj (YUG)	Thomas Horschel (GDR)	Istaván Illés (HUN)
1987 Tampere	Ilia Vasilev (BUL)	Vasile Andrei (ROU)	Jörg Kotte (GDR)
1988 Kolbotn	Anatoli Fedorenko (URS)	Jožef Tertei (YUG)	Gerhard Himmel (FRG)
1989 Oulu	Andrzej Wroński (POL)	Ion Ieremciuc (ROU)	Viacheslav Klimenko (URS)
1990 Poznan	Anatol Fedarenka (URS)	Maik Bullmann (GDR)	Andrzej Wroński (POL)
1991 Aschaffenburg	Sergey Demyashkevich (URS)	Andreas Steinbach (GER)	Sándor Major (HUN)
1992 Kopenhag	Andrzej Wroński (POL)	Ibragim Shovjalov (CIS)	Andreas Steinbach (GER)
1993 İstanbul	Sergey Demyashkevich (BLR)	Ibragim Shovjalov (RUS)	Tenguiz Tedoradze (GEO)
1994 Athens	Andrzej Wroński (POL)	Petros Triantafyllidis (GRE)	Georgiy Saldadze (UKR)
1995 Besançon	Mikael Ljungberg (SWE)	Georgiy Saldadze (UKR)	Sergey Lishtvan (BLR)
1996 Budapest	Sergey Lishtvan (BLR)	Georgiy Raykov (MDA)	Andrzej Wroński (POL)
1997 Kouvola	Hakkı Başar (TUR)	Anatoli Fedorenko (BLR)	Konstantinos Thanos (GRE)
1998 Minsk	Sergey Lishtvan (BLR)	Mikael Ljungberg (SWE)	Hakkı Başar (TUR)
1999 Sofia	Mikael Ljungberg (SWE)	Ali Mollov (BUL)	Petru Sudureac (ROU)
2000 Moscow	Sergey Lishtvan (BLR)	Gogi Koguashvili (RUS)	Mehmet Özal (TUR)
2001 İstanbul	Alexandr Bezruchkin (RUS)	Ali Mollov (BUL)	Petru Sudureac (ROU)
2002 Seinäjoki	Gogi Koguashvili (RUS)	Sergey Lishtvan (BLR)	Davyd Saldadze (UKR)
2003 Belgrad	Ramaz Nozadze (GEO)	Mirko Englich (GER)	Davyd Saldadze (UKR)
2004 Haparanda	Martin Lidberg (SWE)	Sergey Lishtvan (BLR)	Marek Švec (CZE)
2005 Varna	Hamza Yerlikaya (TUR)	Jimmy Lidberg (SWE)	Mindaugas Ežerskis (LTU)
2005 Varna	Hamza Yerlikaya (TUR)	Jimmy Lidberg (SWE)	Dimitriy Timchenko (UKR)
2006 Moscow	Hamza Yerlikaya (TUR)	Mikhail Nikolaev (UKR)	Marek Švec (CZE)
2006 Moscow	Hamza Yerlikaya (TUR)	Mikhail Nikolaev (UKR)	Jimmy Lidberg (SWE)
2007 Sofia	Ramaz Nozadze (GEO)	Jimmy Lidberg (SWE)	Vasili Teplujov (RUS)
2007 Sofia	Ramaz Nozadze (GEO)	Jimmy Lidberg (SWE)	Balázs Kiss (HUN)
2008 Tampere	Aslanbek Khushtov (RUS)	Mirko Englich (GER)	Elis Guri (ALB)
2008 Tampere	Aslanbek Khushtov (RUS)	Mirko Englich (GER)	Ramaz Nozadze (GEO)
2009 Vilnius	Aslanbek Khushtov (RUS)	Mindaugas Ežerskis (LTU)	Marek Švec (CZE)
2009 Vilnius	Aslanbek Khushtov (RUS)	Mindaugas Ežerskis (LTU)	Jimmy Lidberg (SWE)
2010 Bakü	Aslanbek Khushtov (RUS)	Tsimafei Dzeinichenka (BLR)	Soso Jabidze (GEO)
2010 Bakü	Aslanbek Khushtov (RUS)	Tsimafei Dzeinichenka (BLR)	Cenk İldem (TUR)
2011 Dortmund	Tsimafei Dzeinichenka (BLR)	Artur Aleksanyan (ARM)	Shalva Gadabadze (AZE)
2011 Dortmund	Tsimafei Dzeinichenka (BLR)	Artur Aleksanyan (ARM)	Elis Guri (BUL)
2012 Belgrad	Artur Aleksanyan (ARM)	Mindaugas Ezerskis (LTU)	Shalva Gadabadze (AZE)
2012 Belgrad	Artur Aleksanyan (ARM)	Mindaugas Ezerskis (LTU)	Serhiy Rutenko (UKR)
2013 Tiflis	Artur Aleksanyan (ARM)	Vladislav Metodiev (BUL)	Melonin Noumonvi (FRA)
2013 Tiflis	Artur Aleksanyan (ARM)	Vladislav Metodiev (BUL)	Cenk İldem (TUR)
2014 Vantaa	Artur Aleksanyan (ARM)	Cenk İldem (TUR)	Fredrik Schön (SWE)
2014 Vantaa	Artur Aleksanyan (ARM)	Cenk İldem (TUR)	Marthin Nielsen (NOR)
2015 Baku	Islam Magomedov (RUS)	Dimitiry Timchenko (UKR)	Melonin Noumonvi (FRA)
2015 Baku	Islam Magomedov (RUS)	Dimitiry Timchenko (UKR)	Cenk İldem (TUR)
2016 Riga	Nikita Melnikov (RUS)	Artur Aleksanyan (ARM)	Cenk İldem (TUR)
2016 Riga	Nikita Melnikov (RUS)	Artur Aleksanyan (ARM)	Aliaksandr Hrabovik (BLR)
2017 Novi Sad	Felix Baldauf (NOR)	Aliaksandr Hrabovik (BLR)	Balázs Kiss (HUN)
2017 Novi Sad	Felix Baldauf (NOR)	Aliaksandr Hrabovik (BLR)	Artur Aleksanyan (ARM)
2018 Kaspiysk	Artur Aleksanyan (ARM)	Mikheil Kajaia (SRB)	Elias Kuosmanen (FIN)
2018 Kaspiysk	Artur Aleksanyan (ARM)	Mikheil Kajaia (SRB)	Balázs Kiss (HUN)
2019 Bucharest	Musa Evloev (RUS)	Kiril Milov (BUL)	Daigoro Timoncini (ITA)
2019 Bucharest	Musa Evloev (RUS)	Kiril Milov (BUL)	Elias Kuosmanen (FIN)
2020 Rome	Artur Aleksanyan (ARM)	Nikoloz Kakhelashvili (ITA)	Cenk İldem (TUR)
2020 Rome	Artur Aleksanyan (ARM)	Nikoloz Kakhelashvili (ITA)	Aleksandr Golovin (RUS)
2021 Warsaw	Musa Evloev (RUS)	Balázs Kiss (HUN)	Nikoloz Kakhelashvili (ITA)
2021 Warsaw	Musa Evloev (RUS)	Balázs Kiss (HUN)	Mikalai Stadub (BLR)
2022 Budapest	Kiril Milov (BUL)	Arvi Savolainen (FIN)	Daniel Gastl (AUT)
2022 Budapest	Kiril Milov (BUL)	Arvi Savolainen (FIN)	Vladlen Kozliuk (UKR)
2023 Zagreb	Artur Aleksanyan (ARM)	Kiril Milov (BUL)	Mikheil Kajaia (SRB)
2023 Zagreb	Artur Aleksanyan (ARM)	Kiril Milov (BUL)	Artur Omarov (CZE)
2024 Bucharest	Artur Aleksanyan (ARM)	Magomed Murtazaliev (ANA)	Abubakar Khaslakhanau (ANA)
2024 Bucharest	Artur Aleksanyan (ARM)	Magomed Murtazaliev (ANA)	Kiril Milov (BUL)

== Super heavyweight ==
- +100 kg: 1969–1983
- 130 kg: 1985–2001
- 120 kg: 2002–2013
- 130 kg: 2014–

Tournament	Gold	Silver	Bronze
1969 Modena	Ömer Topuz (TUR)	Arne Robertsson (SWE)	Giuseppe Marcucci (ITA)
1970 East Berlin	Roland Bock (FRG)	Edward Wojda (POL)	Aleksandar Tomov (BUL)
1972 Katowice	Aleksandar Tomov (BUL)	Anatoly Kochnev (URS)	Victor Dolipschi (ROU)
1973 Helsinki	Aleksandar Tomov (BUL)	Marek Galiński (POL)	Shota Morchiladze (URS)
1974 Madrid	Shota Morchiladze (URS)	Aleksandar Tomov (BUL)	Roman Codreanu (ROU)
1975 Ludwigshafen	János Rovnyai (HUN)	Nikola Dinev (BUL)	Aleksandr Kolchinsky (URS)
1976 Leningrad	Aleksandar Tomov (BUL)	Aleksandr Kolchinsky (URS)	József Nagy (HUN)
1977 Bursa	Nikola Dinev (BUL)	Aleksandr Kolchinsky (URS)	Victor Dolipschi (ROU)
1978 Sofia	Roman Codreanu (ROU)	Aleksandr Tomov (BUL)	József Nagy (HUN)
1979 Bucharest	Aleksandr Tomov (BUL)	Roman Codreanu (ROU)	Kenan Ege (TUR)
1980 Prievidza	Nikola Dinev (BUL)	Yevgueni Artiujin (URS)	Prvoslav Ilić (YUG)
1981 Lodz	Rangel Gerovski (BUL)	Yevgueni Artiujin (URS)	Henryk Tomanek (POL)
1982 Varna	Nikola Dinev (BUL)	Prvoslav Ilić (YUG)	Yevgueni Artiujin (URS)
1983 Budapest	Nikola Dinev (BUL)	József Nagy (HUN)	Yevgueni Artiujin (URS)
1984 Jönköping	Aleksandar Tomov (BUL)	Henryk Tomanek (POL)	Igor Rostorotski (URS)
1985 Leipzig	Igor Rostorotski (URS)	Rangel Gerovski (BUL)	Sławomir Luto (POL)
1986 Piraeus	Nikola Dinev (BUL)	Nikolay Makarenko (URS)	Tomas Johansson (SWE)
1987 Tampere	Igor Rostorotski (URS)	Tomas Johansson (SWE)	Rangel Gerovski (BUL)
1988 Kolbotn	Aleksandr Karelin (URS)	Krasimir Radoev (BUL)	Tomas Johansson (SWE)
1989 Oulu	Aleksandr Karelin (URS)	Sławomir Zrobek (POL)	Tomas Johansson (SWE)
1990 Poznan	Aleksandr Karelin (URS)	Rangel Gerovski (BUL)	Ioan Grigoraș (ROU)
1991 Aschaffenburg	Aleksandr Karelin (URS)	Tomas Johansson (SWE)	György Kékes (HUN)
1992 Kopenhag	Aleksandr Karelin (CIS)	Ioan Grigoraș (ROU)	György Kékes (HUN)
1993 İstanbul	Aleksandr Karelin (RUS)	Petro Kotok (UKR)	Sergei Mureiko (MDA)
1994 Athens	Aleksandr Karelin (RUS)	György Kékes (HUN)	Petro Kotok (UKR)
1995 Besançon	Aleksandr Karelin (RUS)	Şaban Donat (TUR)	Sergei Mureiko (MDA)
1996 Budapest	Aleksandr Karelin (RUS)	Petro Kotok (UKR)	Sergei Mureiko (MDA)
1997 Kouvola	Sergei Mureiko (BUL)	Juha Ahokas (FIN)	Alexandr Bezruchkin (RUS)
1998 Minsk	Aleksandr Karelin (RUS)	Georgiy Saldadze (UKR)	Sergei Mureiko (BUL)
1999 Sofia	Aleksandr Karelin (RUS)	Anastasios Sofianidis (GRE)	Giuseppe Giunta (ITA)
2000 Moscow	Aleksandr Karelin (RUS)	Sergei Mureiko (BUL)	Mihály Deák-Bárdos (HUN)
2001 İstanbul	Mihály Deák-Bárdos (HUN)	Fatih Bakir (TUR)	Sergei Mureiko (BUL)
2002 Seinäjoki	Yuri Patrikeyev (RUS)	Mihály Deák-Bárdos (HUN)	Juha Ahokas (FIN)
2003 Belgrad	Juha Ahokas (FIN)	Mihály Deák-Bárdos (HUN)	Xenofon Koutsioumpas (GRE)
2004 Haparanda	Yuri Patrikeyev (RUS)	Kostiantyn Stryzhak (UKR)	Sergei Mureiko (BUL)
2005 Varna	Siarhei Artsiukhin (BLR)	Yekta Yılmaz Gül (TUR)	Mirian Giorgadze (GEO)
2005 Varna	Siarhei Artsiukhin (BLR)	Yekta Yılmaz Gül (TUR)	Krasimir Kochev (BUL)
2006 Moscow	İsmail Güzel (TUR)	Juha Ahokas (FIN)	Khasan Baroev (RUS)
2006 Moscow	İsmail Güzel (TUR)	Juha Ahokas (FIN)	Oleksandr Chernetskyi (UKR)
2007 Sofia	Khasan Baroev (RUS)	David Vala (CZE)	Jalmar Sjöberg (SWE)
2007 Sofia	Khasan Baroev (RUS)	David Vala (CZE)	İsmail Güzel (TUR)
2008 Tampere	Yury Patrikeyev (ARM)	Khasan Baroev (RUS)	Ioseb Chugoshvili (BLR)
2008 Tampere	Yury Patrikeyev (ARM)	Khasan Baroev (RUS)	Atilla Güzel (TUR)
2009 Vilnius	Yury Patrikeyev (ARM)	Jalmar Sjöberg (SWE)	Mihály Deák-Bárdos (HUN)
2009 Vilnius	Yury Patrikeyev (ARM)	Jalmar Sjöberg (SWE)	Nico Schmidt (GER)
2010 Bakü	Rıza Kayaalp (TUR)	Radomir Petković (SRB)	Johan Eurén (SWE)
2010 Bakü	Rıza Kayaalp (TUR)	Radomir Petković (SRB)	Mindaugas Mizgaitis (LTU)
2011 Dortmund	Khasan Baroev (RUS)	Rıza Kayaalp (TUR)	Yury Patrikeyev (ARM)
2011 Dortmund	Khasan Baroev (RUS)	Rıza Kayaalp (TUR)	Mihály Deák-Bárdos (HUN)
2012 Belgrad	Rıza Kayaalp (TUR)	Khasan Baroev (RUS)	Yury Patrikeyev (ARM)
2012 Belgrad	Rıza Kayaalp (TUR)	Khasan Baroev (RUS)	Yevhenii Orlov (UKR)
2013 Tiflis	Rıza Kayaalp (TUR)	Yevhenii Orlov (UKR)	Vachik Yeghiazaryan (ARM)
2013 Tiflis	Rıza Kayaalp (TUR)	Yevhenii Orlov (UKR)	Guram Pherselidze (GEO)
2014 Vantaa	Rıza Kayaalp (TUR)	Lyubomir Dimitrov (BUL)	Johan Eurén (SWE)
2014 Vantaa	Rıza Kayaalp (TUR)	Lyubomir Dimitrov (BUL)	Vasily Parshin (RUS)
2015 Baku	Rıza Kayaalp (TUR)	Sabah Shariati (AZE)	Heiki Nabi (EST)
2015 Baku	Rıza Kayaalp (TUR)	Sabah Shariati (AZE)	Ioseb Chugoshvili (BLR)
2016 Riga	Rıza Kayaalp (TUR)	Oleksandr Chernetskyi (UKR)	Johan Euren (SWE)
2016 Riga	Rıza Kayaalp (TUR)	Oleksandr Chernetskyi (UKR)	Ioseb Chugoshvili (BLR)
2017 Novi Sad	Rıza Kayaalp (TUR)	Bálint Lám (HUN)	Vitalii Shchur (RUS)
2017 Novi Sad	Rıza Kayaalp (TUR)	Bálint Lám (HUN)	Levan Arabuli (GEO)
2018 Kaspiysk	Rıza Kayaalp (TUR)	Vitalii Shchur (RUS)	Alin Alexuc-Ciurariu (ROU)
2018 Kaspiysk	Rıza Kayaalp (TUR)	Vitalii Shchur (RUS)	Iakob Kajaia (GEO)
2019 Bucharest	Rıza Kayaalp (TUR)	Iakob Kajaia (GEO)	Sergey Semenov (RUS)
2019 Bucharest	Rıza Kayaalp (TUR)	Iakob Kajaia (GEO)	Alin Alexuc-Ciurariu (ROU)
2020 Rome	Alin Alexuc-Ciurariu (ROU)	Levan Arabuli (GEO)	Mykola Kuchmii (UKR)
2020 Rome	Alin Alexuc-Ciurariu (ROU)	Levan Arabuli (GEO)	Jello Krahmer (GER)
2021 Warsaw	Rıza Kayaalp (TUR)	Iakob Kajaia (GEO)	Zurabi Gedekhauri (RUS)
2021 Warsaw	Rıza Kayaalp (TUR)	Iakob Kajaia (GEO)	Eduard Popp (GER)
2022 Budapest	Rıza Kayaalp (TUR)	Danila Sotnikov (ITA)	Konsta Mäenpää (FIN)
2022 Budapest	Rıza Kayaalp (TUR)	Danila Sotnikov (ITA)	Dáriusz Vitek (HUN)
2023 Zagreb	Rıza Kayaalp (TUR)	Sabah Shariati (AZE)	Iakobi Kajaia (GEO)
2023 Zagreb	Rıza Kayaalp (TUR)	Sabah Shariati (AZE)	Oskar Marvik (NOR)
2024 Bucharest	Sergey Semenov (ANA)	Rıza Kayaalp (TUR)	Beka Kandelaki (AZE)
2024 Bucharest	Sergey Semenov (ANA)	Rıza Kayaalp (TUR)	Danila Sotnikov (ITA)

== All time medal table ==
As of 2024 European Wrestling Championships

Rank	Nation	Gold	Silver	Bronze	Total
1	Soviet Union	99	56	40	195
2	Russia	77	30	39	146
3	Bulgaria	58	64	58	180
4	Sweden	49	48	43	140
5	Turkey	47	29	51	127
6	Hungary	45	49	68	162
7	Germany	43	49	60	152
8	Finland	28	27	35	90
9	Romania	25	42	38	105
10	Armenia	24	14	24	62
11	Azerbaijan	20	17	34	71
12	Poland	19	33	29	81
13	Georgia	12	21	30	63
14	Ukraine	11	23	38	72
15	Belarus	10	23	21	54
16	Yugoslavia	8	9	10	27
17	Norway	6	8	12	26
18	Estonia	5	13	11	29
19	East Germany	4	11	8	23
20	Serbia	4	9	10	23
21	Denmark	4	6	3	13
22	Italy	4	5	19	28
23	CIS	4	1	1	6
24	Greece	3	8	9	20
25	Czechoslovakia	3	7	24	34
26	France	3	4	19	26
27	Moldova	2	5	6	13
–	Individual Neutral Athletes (Note: At the 2024 European Championships, in accordance with sanctions imposed following by the 2022 Russian invasion of Ukraine, wrestlers from Russia and Belarus were not permitted to use the name, flag, or anthem of Russia or Belarus. They instead participated as "Individual Neutral Athletes (AIN)", their medals were not included in the official medal table.)	1	3	6	10
28	Czech Republic	1	1	5	7
29	Latvia	1	1	4	6
30	Egypt	1	1	0	2
31	Slovakia	1	0	3	4
32	Switzerland	0	3	1	4
33	Lithuania	0	2	6	8
34	Israel	0	2	4	6
35	Austria	0	2	3	5
36	Serbia and Montenegro	0	1	0	1
37	Croatia	0	0	9	9
38	Belgium	0	0	2	2
39	Albania	0	0	1	1
39	Netherlands	0	0	1	1
39	Spain	0	0	1	1
Totals (41 entries)		622	627	786	2,035

- Names in italic are national entities that no longer exist.
