= 1927 European Wrestling Championships =

- Host city: Hungary, Budapest
- Dates: 3-5 November 1927

The 1927 European Wrestling Championships were held in Budapest (Hungary) in 1927 under the organization of the International Federation of Associated Wrestling (FILA) and the Hungarian Wrestling Federation. It only competed in the Greco-Roman style categories.

== Medal table ==
Rank	Nation	Gold	Silver	Bronze	Total
1	Hungary	2	1	1	4
2	Estonia	1	2	2	5
3	Czechoslovakia	1	0	2	3
4	Germany	1	0	0	1
4	Italy	1	0	0	1
6	Sweden	0	3	0	3
7	Norway	0	0	1	1
Totals (7 entries)		6	6	6	18

== Medal summary ==
=== Men's Greco-Roman ===
Event	Gold	Silver	Bronze
58 kg	Giovanni Gozzi; Italy	Eduard Pütsep; Estonia	Armand Magyar; Hungary
62 kg	Voldemar Väli; Estonia	Károly Kárpáti; Hungary	Martin Egeberg; Norway
67.5 kg	Eduard Sperling; Germany	Harald Pettersson; Sweden	Osvald Käpp; Estonia
75+ kg	László Papp; Hungary	Albert Kusnets; Estonia	František Hála; Czechoslovakia
82.5 kg	Alexander Szabó; Czechoslovakia	Thure Sjöstedt; Sweden	Rudolf Loo; Estonia
82.5+ kg	Rajmund Badó; Hungary	Johan Richthoff; Sweden	Josef Urban; Czechoslovakia
