= 1982 European Wrestling Championships =

- Host city: Bulgaria, Varna
- Dates: 17 – 25 April 1982

Champions
- Freestyle: Soviet Union
- Greco-Roman: Soviet Union

The 1982 European Wrestling Championships was held from 17 to 25 April 1982 in Varna, Bulgaria.

== Medal table ==
Rank	Nation	Gold	Silver	Bronze	Total
1	Soviet Union	10	4	4	18
2	Bulgaria	7	1	4	12
3	Hungary	1	5	1	7
4	Poland	1	1	2	4
5	West Germany	1	0	0	1
6	Romania	0	2	1	3
6	Sweden	0	2	1	3
8	Yugoslavia	0	1	3	4
9	Turkey	0	1	2	3
10	Czechoslovakia	0	1	1	2
10	East Germany	0	1	1	2
12	Finland	0	1	0	1
Totals (12 entries)		20	20	20	60

== Medal summary ==
=== Men's freestyle ===
Event	Gold	Silver	Bronze
48 kg	László Bíró; Hungary	Vasili Gogolev; Soviet Union	Shaban Tërstena; Yugoslavia
52 kg	Valentin Yordanov; Bulgaria	Lajos Szabó; Hungary	Osman Efendiyev; Soviet Union
57 kg	Sergei Beloglazov; Soviet Union	Imre Szalontai; Hungary	Stefan Ivanov; Bulgaria
62 kg	Simeon Shterev Sr. Bulgaria	Yusuf Gambaz; Turkey	Buzai Ibraguimov; Soviet Union
68 kg	Boris Budayev; Soviet Union	Zoltán Szalontai; Hungary	Ivan Yankov; Bulgaria
74 kg	Martin Knosp; West Germany	Pekka Rauhala; Finland	Yuri Vorobiov; Soviet Union
82 kg	Efraim Kamberov; Bulgaria	Vladimir Modosian; Soviet Union	Peter Syring; East Germany
90 kg	Ivan Guinov; Bulgaria	Piotr Naniyev; Soviet Union	İsmail Temiz; Turkey
100 kg	Bagrat Chutaba; Soviet Union	Uwe Neupert; East Germany	Július Strnisko; Czechoslovakia
+100 kg	Soslan Andiyev; Soviet Union	János Rovnyai; Hungary	Adam Sandurski; Bulgaria

=== Men's Greco-Roman ===
Event	Gold	Silver	Bronze
48 kg	Vasili Anikin; Soviet Union	Csaba Vadász; Hungary	Totio Andonov; Bulgaria
52 kg	Benur Pashayan; Soviet Union	Gheorghe Ştefan; Romania	Roman Kierpacz; Poland
57 kg	Petar Balov; Bulgaria	Josef Krysta; Czechoslovakia	Mehmet Serhat Karadağ; Turkey
62 kg	Roman Nasibulov; Soviet Union	Panayot Kirov; Bulgaria	Tamás Tóth; Hungary
68 kg	Guennadi Ermilov; Soviet Union	Ștefan Negrișan; Romania	Gerry Svensson; Sweden
74 kg	Andrzej Supron; Poland	Roger Tallroth; Sweden	Karolj Kasap; Yugoslavia
82 kg	Aslan Zhanimov; Soviet Union	Andrzej Malina; Poland	Ion Draica; Romania
90 kg	Igor Kanygin; Soviet Union	Frank Andersson; Sweden	Atanas Komchev; Bulgaria
100 kg	Andrey Dimitrov; Bulgaria	Nikolai Inkov; Soviet Union	Jožef Tertelj; Yugoslavia
+100 kg	Nikola Dinev; Bulgaria	Prvoslav Ilić; Yugoslavia	Yevgueni Artiujin; Soviet Union
