= 1925 European Wrestling Championships =

- Host city: Italy, Milan
- Dates: 1925

The 1925 European Wrestling Championships were held in Milan (Italy) in 1925 under the organization of the International Federation of Associated Wrestling (FILA) and the Italian Wrestling Federation. It only competed in the Greco-Roman style categories.

== Medal table ==
Rank	Nation	Gold	Silver	Bronze	Total
1	Hungary	3	1	2	6
2	Sweden	2	0	1	3
3	Germany	1	2	0	3
4	Italy	0	1	2	3
5	Austria	0	1	0	1
5	Finland	0	1	0	1
7	France	0	0	1	1
Totals (7 entries)		6	6	6	18

== Medal summary ==
=== Men's Greco-Roman ===
Event	Gold	Silver	Bronze
58 kg	Armand Magyar; Hungary	Giovanni Gozzi; Italy	Carlo Ponte; Italy
62 kg	Jenő Németh; Hungary	Ernst Steinig; Germany	Erik Malmberg; Sweden
67.5 kg	Lajos Keresztes; Hungary	Ludwig Sesta; Austria	Mihály Matura; Hungary
75+ kg	Friedrich Bräun; Germany	Väinö Kokkinen; Finland	Mario Gruppioni; Italy
82.5 kg	Carl Westergren; Sweden	Robert Rupp; Germany	László Papp; Hungary
82.5+ kg	Rudolf Svensson; Sweden	Rajmund Badó; Hungary	Edmond Dame; France
