= 1934 European Wrestling Championships =

- Host city: Sweden Stockholm, Freestyle; Italy Rome, Greco-Roman
- Dates: 3 - 7 October 1934; 26 - 30 April 1934

Champions
- Freestyle: Sweden
- Greco-Roman: Sweden

The 1934 European Wrestling Championships were held in the men's Freestyle style in Stockholm 3 - 7 October 1934; the Greco-Romane style and in Rome 26 - 30 April 1934.

== Medal table ==
Rank	Nation	Gold	Silver	Bronze	Total
1	Sweden	6	3	2	11
2	Germany	3	3	2	8
3	Finland	3	2	1	6
4	Hungary	1	3	3	7
5	Latvia	1	0	1	2
6	Czechoslovakia	0	1	1	2
6	Denmark	0	1	1	2
8	Estonia	0	1	0	1
9	Italy	0	0	2	2
10	Romania	0	0	1	1
Totals (10 entries)		14	14	14	42

== Medal summary ==
=== Men's freestyle ===
Event	Gold	Silver	Bronze
56 kg	Márton Lőrincz; Hungary	Hermann Fischer; Germany	Herman Tuvesson; Sweden
61 kg	Kustaa Pihlajamäki; Finland	Hans Wittwer; Germany	Ferenc Tóth; Hungary
66 kg	Wolfgang Ehrl; Germany	Anders Swansson; Sweden	Abraham Kurland; Denmark
72 kg	Jean Földeák; Germany	Thure Andersson; Sweden	Károly Kárpáti; Hungary
79 kg	Ivar Johansson; Sweden	Elis Wecksten; Finland	Fritz Neuhaus; Germany
87 kg	Knut Fridell; Sweden	Edvard Virág; Hungary	Karl Engelhardt; Germany
87+ kg	Thure Sjöstedt; Sweden	Josef Klapuch; Czechoslovakia	Hjalmar Nyström; Finland

=== Men's Greco-Roman ===
Event	Gold	Silver	Bronze
56 kg	Herman Tuvesson; Sweden	Ödön Zombori; Hungary	Ion Horvath; Romania
61 kg	Kustaa Pihlajamäki; Finland	Ferenc Tóth; Hungary	Giovanni Gozzi; Italy
66 kg	Aarne Reini; Finland	Abraham Kurland; Denmark	Einar Karlsson; Sweden
72 kg	Gunnar Glans; Sweden	Mikko Nordling; Finland	Ercole Gallegati; Italy
79 kg	Ivar Johansson; Sweden	August Neo; Estonia	László Papp; Hungary
87 kg	Edvīns Bietags; Latvia	Erich Siebert; Germany	František Mráček; Czechoslovakia
87+ kg	Kurt Hornfischer; Germany	Rudolf Svensson; Sweden	Alberts Zvejnieks; Latvia
