= 1938 European Wrestling Championships =

- Host city: Estonia, Tallinn
- Dates: 24–27 April 1938
- Stadium: Estonia Theatre

Champions
- Greco-Roman: Sweden

The 1938 European Wrestling Championships were held in 24–27 April 1938 Tallinn, Estonia in the building of the Estonia Theater. The competitions were held only in Greco-Roman wrestling. 72 athletes from 13 countries took part in 7 weight categories.

== Medal table ==
Rank	Nation	Gold	Silver	Bronze	Total
1	Finland	3	0	1	4
2	Sweden	2	4	1	7
3	Germany	1	1	2	4
4	Estonia	1	1	1	3
5	Latvia	0	1	0	1
6	Norway	0	0	1	1
6	Turkey	0	0	1	1
Totals (7 entries)		7	7	7	21

== Medal summary ==
=== Men's Greco-Roman ===
Event	Gold	Silver	Bronze
56 kg	Väinö Perttunen; Finland	Kurt Pettersén; Sweden	Ferdinand Schmitz; Germany
61 kg	Kustaa Pihlajamäki; Finland	Egon Svensson; Sweden	Egil Solsvik; Norway
66 kg	Lauri Koskela; Finland	Heinrich Nettesheim; Germany	Gösta Andersson; Sweden
72 kg	Fritz Schäfer; Germany	Rudolf Svedberg; Sweden	Antti Mäki; Finland
79 kg	Ivar Johansson; Sweden	Georgs Ozolinš; Latvia	Voldemar Roolaan; Estonia
87 kg	Axel Cadier; Sweden	Nikolai Karklin; Estonia	Werner Seelenbinder; Germany
87+ kg	Johannes Kotkas; Estonia	John Nyman; Sweden	Mehmet Çoban; Turkey
