= 1935 European Wrestling Championships =

- Host city: Belgium Brussels, Freestyle; Copenhagen, Denmark Greco-Roman
- Dates: 5 - 8 September 1935; 19 - 21 April 1935

Champions
- Freestyle: Hungary
- Greco-Roman: Sweden

The 1935 European Wrestling Championships were held in the men's Freestyle style in Brussels 5–8 September 1935; the Greco-Romane style and in Copenhagen 19–21 April 1935.

== Medal table ==
Rank	Nation	Gold	Silver	Bronze	Total
1	Sweden	6	1	1	8
2	Germany	2	5	3	10
3	Finland	2	3	2	7
4	Hungary	2	2	1	5
5	Switzerland	1	1	1	3
6	Italy	1	0	1	2
7	Denmark	0	1	1	2
8	Czechoslovakia	0	1	0	1
9	Estonia	0	0	2	2
10	France	0	0	1	1
10	Latvia	0	0	1	1
Totals (11 entries)		14	14	14	42

== Medal summary ==
=== Men's freestyle ===
Event	Gold	Silver	Bronze
56 kg	Marcello Nizzola; Italy	Márton Lőrincz; Hungary	Jakob Brendel; Germany
61 kg	Kustaa Pihlajamäki; Finland	Ferenc Tóth; Hungary	Adalberto Taucer; Italy
66 kg	Károly Kárpáti; Hungary	Hermanni Pihlajamäki; Finland	Wolfgang Ehrl; Germany
72 kg	Stig Andersson; Sweden	Fritz Schäfer; Germany	Willy Angst; Switzerland
79 kg	Ivar Johansson; Sweden	Eugen Angst; Switzerland	Kálmán Sóvári; Hungary
87 kg	Edvard Virág; Hungary	Axel Cadier; Sweden	August Neo; Estonia
87+ kg	Karl Hegglin; Switzerland	Kurt Hornfischer; Germany	Nils Åkerlindh; Sweden

=== Men's Greco-Roman ===
Event	Gold	Silver	Bronze
56 kg	Herman Tuvesson; Sweden	Antonín Nič; Czechoslovakia	Esko Hjelt; Finland
61 kg	Sebastian Hering; Germany	Hermanni Pihlajamäki; Finland	Aage Meier; Denmark
66 kg	Lauri Koskela; Finland	Abraham Kurland; Denmark	Wolfgang Ehrl; Germany
72 kg	Rudolf Svedberg; Sweden	Fritz Schäfer; Germany	Antti Mäki; Finland
79 kg	Ivar Johansson; Sweden	Josef Paar; Germany	Béchir Bouazzat; France
87 kg	Axel Cadier; Sweden	Paul Böhmer; Germany	August Neo; Estonia
87+ kg	Kurt Hornfischer; Germany	Hjalmar Nyström; Finland	Alberts Zvejnieks; Latvia
