= 1985 European Wrestling Championships =

- Host city: East Germany, Leipzig
- Dates: 23 – 28 April 1985

Champions
- Freestyle: Soviet Union
- Greco-Roman: Soviet Union

The 1985 European Wrestling Championships was held from 23 to 28 April 1985 in Leipzig, East Germany.

== Medal table ==
Rank	Nation	Gold	Silver	Bronze	Total
1	Soviet Union	14	2	4	20
2	Bulgaria	3	5	3	11
3	Romania	1	4	2	7
4	East Germany	1	3	1	5
5	Poland	1	2	3	6
6	Turkey	0	1	2	3
7	Hungary	0	1	1	2
7	West Germany	0	1	1	2
9	Yugoslavia	0	1	0	1
10	Czechoslovakia	0	0	1	1
10	Finland	0	0	1	1
10	Sweden	0	0	1	1
Totals (12 entries)		20	20	20	60

== Medal summary ==
=== Men's freestyle ===
Event	Gold	Silver	Bronze
48 kg	Vasili Gogolev; Soviet Union	Władysław Olejnik; Poland	Alin -Romulus Păcurar; Romania
52 kg	Valentin Yordanov; Bulgaria	Shaban Tërstena; Yugoslavia	Aleksandr Kirkesner; Soviet Union
57 kg	Stefan Ivanov; Bulgaria	Bernd Bobrich; East Germany	Gurguen Bagdasarian; Soviet Union
62 kg	Lutz Remus; East Germany	Sirayudin Ayubov; Soviet Union	Valentin Savov; Bulgaria
68 kg	Arsen Fadzayev; Soviet Union	Fevzi Şeker; Turkey	Simeon Shterev Sr. Bulgaria
74 kg	Anatoli Polomarov; Soviet Union	Kemal Padarev; Bulgaria	Martin Knosp; West Germany
82 kg	Yuri Vorobiov; Soviet Union	Hans-Peter Franz; East Germany	Leszek Ciota; Poland
90 kg	Robert Tibilov; Soviet Union	Iulian Risnoveanu; Romania	Reşit Karabacak; Turkey
100 kg	Leri Khabelov; Soviet Union	Uwe Neupert; East Germany	Hayri Sezgin; Turkey
130 kg	David Gobejishvili; Soviet Union	Atanas Atanasov; Bulgaria	Andreas Schröder; East Germany

=== Men's Greco-Roman ===
Event	Gold	Silver	Bronze
48 kg	Bratan Tsenov; Bulgaria	Bernd Scherer; West Germany	Temo Kasarashvili; Soviet Union
52 kg	Roman Kierpacz; Poland	Minseit Tazetdinov; Soviet Union	Valentin Krumov; Bulgaria
57 kg	Oganes Arutunian; Soviet Union	Nicolae Zamfir; Romania	Benni Ljungbeck; Sweden
62 kg	Kamandar Madzhidov; Soviet Union	Bogusław Klozik; Poland	Árpád Sipos; Hungary
68 kg	Mihail Prokudin; Soviet Union	Ștefan Negrișan; Romania	Stanisław Barej; Poland
74 kg	Ştefan Rusu; Romania	Borislav Velichkov; Bulgaria	Mikhail Mamiashvili; Soviet Union
82 kg	Abdulbasir Battalov; Soviet Union	Tibor Komáromi; Hungary	Sorin Herțea; Romania
90 kg	Igor Kanygin; Soviet Union	Ilie Matei; Romania	Toni Hannula; Finland
100 kg	Anatoli Fedorenko; Soviet Union	Ilia Vasilev; Bulgaria	Dušan Masár; Czechoslovakia
130 kg	Igor Rostorotski; Soviet Union	Rangel Gerovski; Bulgaria	Sławomir Luto; Poland
