= 1926 European Wrestling Championships =

- Host city: Latvia, Riga
- Dates: 4-5 September 1926

The 1926 European Wrestling Championships were held in Riga (Latvia) in 1926 under the organization of the International Federation of Associated Wrestling (FILA) and the Latvian Wrestling Federation. It only competed in the Greco-Roman style categories.

== Medal table ==
Rank	Nation	Gold	Silver	Bronze	Total
1	Germany	2	2	1	5
2	Sweden	2	1	1	4
3	Estonia	1	2	0	3
4	Denmark	1	0	0	1
5	Czechoslovakia	0	1	1	2
6	Hungary	0	0	3	3
Totals (6 entries)		6	6	6	18

== Medal summary ==
=== Men's Greco-Roman ===
Event	Gold	Silver	Bronze
58 kg	Sigfrid Hansson; Sweden	Paul Reiber; Germany	Armand Magyar; Hungary
62 kg	Voldemar Väli; Estonia	Erik Malmberg; Sweden	Ernst Steinig; Germany
67.5 kg	Harald Pettersson; Sweden	Osvald Käpp; Estonia	Mihály Matura; Hungary
75+ kg	Johannes Jacobsen; Denmark	Friedrich Bräun; Germany	László Papp; Hungary
82.5 kg	Robert Rupp; Germany	Rudolf Loo; Estonia	Aleksander Szabó; Czechoslovakia
82.5+ kg	Georg Gehring; Germany	Josef Urban; Czechoslovakia	Johan Richthoff; Sweden
