= 1931 European Wrestling Championships =

- Host city: Hungary Budapest, freestyle Czechoslovakia Prague, Greco-Roman
- Dates: 9–11 October 1931; 27 - 29 March 1931

Champions
- Freestyle: Hungary
- Greco-Roman: Finland

The 1931 European Wrestling Championships were held in the men's freestyle in Budapest 9–11 October 1931; the Greco-Romane style and in Prague 27–29 March 1931.

== Medal table ==
Rank	Nation	Gold	Silver	Bronze	Total
1	Finland	4	3	1	8
2	Sweden	3	2	2	7
3	Switzerland	3	0	0	3
4	Germany	2	2	2	6
4	Hungary	2	2	2	6
6	Belgium	0	2	1	3
7	Estonia	0	2	0	2
8	France	0	1	2	3
9	Czechoslovakia	0	0	1	1
9	Italy	0	0	1	1
9	Latvia	0	0	1	1
9	Norway	0	0	1	1
Totals (12 entries)		14	14	14	42

== Medal summary ==
=== Men's freestyle ===
Event	Gold	Silver	Bronze
56 kg	Ödön Zombori; Hungary	Piet Mollin; Belgium	Bror Wingren; Sweden
61 kg	Hermanni Pihlajamäki; Finland	Jean Chasson; France	János Fehér; Hungary
66 kg	Hans Minder; Switzerland	Kustaa Pihlajamäki; Finland	A. Delos; France
72 kg	Jean Földeák; Germany	Gyula Zombori; Hungary	Charles Pacôme; France
79 kg	Ernst Kyburz; Switzerland	Péter Glavanov; Hungary	Kyösti Luukko; Finland
87 kg	József Tunyogi; Hungary	Sanfrid Söderqvist; Sweden	Bernard Deferm; Belgium
87+ kg	Willy Bürki; Switzerland	Edmond Charlier; Belgium	József Varga; Hungary

=== Men's Greco-Roman ===
Event	Gold	Silver	Bronze
56 kg	Herman Tuvesson; Sweden	Kurt Leucht; Germany	Marcello Nizzola; Italy
61 kg	Kustaa Pihlajamäki; Finland	Sebastian Hering; Germany	Jindřich Maudr; Czechoslovakia
66 kg	Eduard Sperling; Germany	Voldemar Väli; Estonia	Arild Dahl; Norway
72 kg	Mikko Nordling; Finland	Albert Kusnets; Estonia	Gunnar Glans; Sweden
79 kg	Ivar Johansson; Sweden	Väinö Kokkinen; Finland	Viktors Kavals; Latvia
87 kg	Onni Pellinen; Finland	Rudolf Svensson; Sweden	Anton Vogedes; Germany
87+ kg	Carl Westergren; Sweden	Hjalmar Nyström; Finland	Georg Gehring; Germany
