= 1947 European Wrestling Championships =

- Host city: Czechoslovakia, Prague
- Dates: 11–14 April 1947

Champions
- Greco-Roman: Sweden

The 1947 European Wrestling Championships were held in 11–14 April 1947 Prague, Czechoslovakia. Only Greco-Roman wrestling competitions were held, in which representatives of 15 countries participated. It was the first European Wrestling Championship in which Soviet wrestlers took part.

== Medal table ==
* Host nation (Czech Republic)

Rank	Nation	Gold	Silver	Bronze	Total
1	Sweden	3	1	3	7
2	Soviet Union	3	1	1	5
3	Turkey	1	2	1	4
4	Egypt	1	1	0	2
5	Hungary	0	2	0	2
6	Norway	0	1	0	1
7	Finland	0	0	2	2
8	Czechoslovakia	0	0	1	1
Totals (8 entries)		8	8	8	24

== Medal summary ==
=== Men's Greco-Roman ===
Event	Gold	Silver	Bronze
Flyweight; 52 kg	Bertil Sundin; Sweden	Mohamed Abdel-El; Egypt	Lennart Viitala; Finland
Bantamweight; 57 kg	Mahmoud Hassan; Egypt	Reidar Merli; Norway	Lorentz Freij; Sweden
Featherweight; 62 kg	Olle Anderberg; Sweden	Ferenc Tóth; Hungary	František Kotrbatý; Czechoslovakia
Lightweight; 67 kg	Gösta Frändfors; Sweden	Armenak Yaltyryan; Soviet Union	Celal Atik; Turkey
Welterweight; 73 kg	Yaşar Doğu; Turkey	Gösta Andersson; Sweden	Vyacheslav Kozharsky; Soviet Union
Middleweight; 79 kg	Nikolay Belov; Soviet Union	Muhlis Tayfur; Turkey	Axel Grönberg; Sweden
Light heavyweight 87 kg	Konstantine Koberidze; Soviet Union	Gyula Kovács; Hungary	Karl-Johan Wong; Sweden
Heavyweight +87 kg	Johannes Kotkas; Soviet Union	Mustafa Çakmak; Turkey	Pauli Riihimäki; Finland
