= Hristo Traykov =

Bulgarian wrestler

Personal information
- Nationality: Bulgarian
- Born: 24 September 1947; Elin Pelin, Bulgaria
- Died: 24 June 2014 (aged 66)

Sport
- Sport: Wrestling

Hristo Traykov (24 September 1947 – 24 June 2014) was a Bulgarian wrestler. He competed at the 1968 Summer Olympics and the 1972 Summer Olympics.
