= Omar Bliadze =

Georgian Greco-Roman wrestler (born 1942)

Omar Bliadze (born 31 March 1942 in Tbilisi) (Georgian: ბლიაძე ომარ), is a Georgian Greco-Roman wrestler. He won gold medal at the 1968 European Wrestling Championships.

== World championships ==
Omar Bliadze won a silver medal at the 1969 World Wrestling Championships in Argentina.
