= Ludwig Sesta =

Austrian wrestler

- Born: 14 May 1900
- Died: 29 February 1976 (aged 75)

Ludwig Sesta (14 May 1900 – 29 February 1976) was an Austrian wrestler. He competed in the Greco-Roman lightweight event at the 1924 Summer Olympics. He also won a silver medal at the 1925 European Wrestling Championships.
