= Yuri Sokolov =

- Born: 1889
- Died: 1941 (aged 51–52)

Yuri Sokolov (died 1941), in cooperation with his brother Boris, released the book Russian Folklore in 1938. It became the first textbook on the topic of Russian folklore to be used in the Russian Universities. The information for the book was based on extensive field work that the two had conducted. Due to the popularity of the book, Sokolov was appointed to a plethora of positions in the field of folklore. The highest position in the field of folklore that he attained in his career came in 1938 with his election as the Chair of Folklore at the Moscow Institute of Philosophy, History and Literature.

Russian Folklore became one of the biggest staple texts for any non-Russian folklore or anthropology scholar who was studying the Russian or Soviet society largely because of his influence in the folklore field. The work is divided into 3 sections that describe the different eras of folklore. Since he did field work both before and after the Soviets took over in the October Revolution, he has a section of "Folklore Before The October Revolution" and "Soviet Folklore". Before he goes into the two eras of folklore, he discusses "Problems and Historiography of Folklore". Some scholars are critical of the sources from which he obtained his information, but his image still remains as one of the forefathers in the bringing of Russian Folklore to the Russian and American University setting.

== Works ==
- Russian Folklore. Translated by Catherine Ruth Smith. New York: Macmillan. 1950 [1938]. | 1971 Reprint
