= Sırrı Acar =

Turkish wrestler (born 1943)

Personal information
- Nationality: Turkish
- Born: 1943 (age 82–83) Gökçeören, Turkey
- Height: 1.70 m (5 ft 7 in)
- Weight: 78 kg (172 lb)

Sport
- Sport: Wrestling

Sırrı Acar (born 1943) is a Turkish wrestler. He competed in the 1968 Summer Olympics.
