= Abraham Kurland =

Danish wrestler (1912–1999)

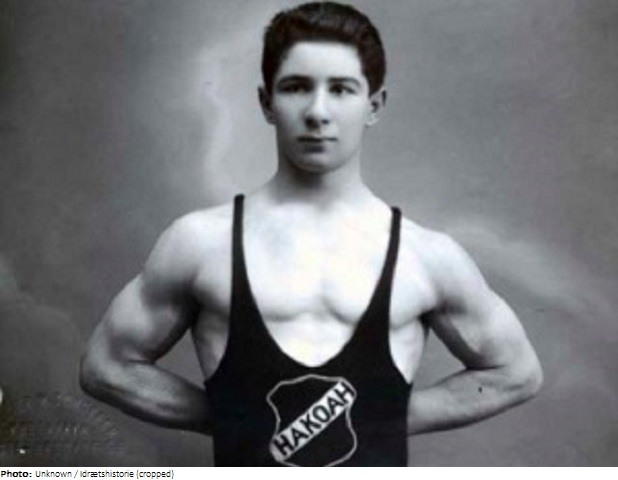

Personal information
- Born: 10 June 1912 Odense, Syddanmark, Denmark
- Died: 14 March 1999 (aged 86)
- Resting place: Mosaisk Vestre Begravelsesplads

Sport
- Country: Denmark
- Sport: wrestling
- Weight class: lightweight
- Events: Greco Roman, freestyle
- Club: Hakoah Jewish Sports Club, København/Bagsværd

Achievements and titles
- National finals: 12x Danish champion
Medal record
Representing Denmark
Olympic Games
Silver medal – second place	1932 Los Angeles	Greco-Roman, Lightweight
European Wrestling Championships
Gold medal – first place	1934 Stockholm	Greco Roman
Silver medal – second place	1935 Brussels	Greco Roman
Bronze medal – third place	1934 Stockholm	Freestyle
Maccabiah Games
Gold medal – first place	1932 Palestine	Greco-Roman, Lightweight

Abraham Kurland (10 June 1912 – 14 March 1999) was a Danish Olympic silver medalist wrestler. Kurland won 12 Denmark championships from 1932–49, won a silver medal in lightweight Greco Roman wrestling at the 1932 Olympics and a gold medal in lightweight at the 1932 Maccabiah Games in Mandatory Palestine, won a gold medal at the 1934 European Wrestling Championships in Greco-Roman and a bronze medal in freestyle, and won a silver medal at the 1935 European Wrestling Championships.

Kurland was the favorite to win a gold medal at the 1936 Olympics. However, he declined to participate because it was taking place in Nazi Germany.

== Biography ==
Kurland was Jewish, and was born in Odense, Syddanmark, Denmark.

He was affiliated with the Hakoah Jewish Sports Club, København/Bagsværd.

In 1928, at 16 years of age, Kurland became Hakoah's first Copenhagen bantamweight champion.

Kurland won 12 Denmark championships from 1932-49.

He won a silver medal in lightweight Greco Roman wrestling at the 1932 Olympics in Los Angeles, at 20 years of age, after being narrowly defeated for the gold medal.

At the 1932 Maccabiah Games in Mandatory Palestine, Kurland won a gold medal in the lightweight category.

At the 1934 European Wrestling Championships Kurland won a gold medal in Greco-Roman, and a bronze medal in freestyle. At the 1935 European Wrestling Championships he won a silver medal in Greco-Roman.

Kurland was the favorite to win a gold medal at the 1936 Olympics. However, he declined to participate because it was taking place in Nazi Germany.

In 1943 during World War II, Kurland fled to Sweden on a fishing boat from Gilleleje to Höganäs with a group Danish-Jewish wrestlers, and they stayed with the families of Swedish wrestlers.

In 1945, he returned to Denmark. Kurland worked there as a coach from 1948-62.

After the war, at the 1948 Olympics in London, Kurland competed in lightweight Greco Roman wrestling at 36 years of age, and came in ninth.

== See also ==
- List of select Jewish wrestlers
- List of Olympic medalists in Greco-Roman wrestling
- List of 1932 Summer Olympics medal winners
