= Rudolf Loo =

Estonian wrestler (1902–1983)

- Born: 1 December 1902; Narva, Russian Empire
- Died: 30 May 1983 (aged 80); Västerås, Sweden

Rudolf Loo (1 December 1902 – 30 May 1983) was an Estonian wrestler. He competed in the Greco-Roman light heavyweight event at the 1924 Summer Olympics. He also won a silver medal at the 1926 European Wrestling Championships and a bronze medal at the 1927 European Wrestling Championships.
