= 1911 European Wrestling Championships =

- Host city: Austria-Hungary, Budapest
- Dates: 1941

Champions
- Greco-Roman: Austria-Hungary

The 1911 European Wrestling Championships were held in 1911 Budapest, Austria-Hungary. It was the first official European Championship in history. The participants competed only in Greco-Roman wrestling.

== Medal table ==
Rank	Nation	Gold	Silver	Bronze	Total
1	Austria-Hungary	2	2	4	8
2	Denmark	1	1	0	2
2	Germany	1	1	0	2
Totals (3 entries)		4	4	4	12

== Medal summary ==
=== Men's Greco-Roman ===
Event	Gold	Silver	Bronze
66,6 kg	Károly Márton; Austria-Hungary	Walter Sohn; Germany	Jenő Dulin; Austria-Hungary
73 kg	Mihály Grozescu; Austria-Hungary	József Sugár; Austria-Hungary	Mihály Csapitzky; Austria-Hungary
93 kg	Harald Christensen; Denmark	József Maróthy; Austria-Hungary	János Hudák; Austria-Hungary
+93 kg	Rudolf Grüneisen; Germany	Søren Marinus Jensen; Denmark	József Előd; Austria-Hungary
