= 1921 European Wrestling Championships =

- Host city: Germany, Offenbach
- Dates: 1921

The 1921 European Wrestling Championships were held in Offenbach (Germany) in 1921 under the organization of the International Federation of Associated Wrestling (FILA) and the German Wrestling Federation. It only competed in the Greco-Roman style categories.

== Medal summary ==
=== Men's Greco-Roman ===
Event	Gold	Silver	Bronze
60 kg	Jonny Andersen; Germany	Herman Brodbeck; Germany	Georg Gerstäcker; Germany
67.5 kg	Fritz Eichblatt; Germany	Heinrich Stiefel; Germany	Otto Ulrich; Germany
75 kg	Heinrich Ketzer; Germany	Philipp Heß; Germany	Sittig; Germany
82.5 kg	Wilhelm Knöpfle; Germany	Fritz Kärcher; Germany	Max Dreifuss; Germany
82.5+ kg	Karl Döppel; Germany	Adolf Kurz; Germany	Hans Köstner; Germany
