= 1924 European Wrestling Championships =

- Host city: Germany, Neunkirchen
- Dates: 1924

The 1924 European Wrestling Championships were held in Neunkirchen (Germany) in 1924 under the organization of the International Federation of Associated Wrestling (FILA) and the German Wrestling Federation. It only competed in the Greco-Roman style categories.

== Medal summary ==
=== Men's Greco-Roman ===
| Event | Gold | Silver | Bronze |
|---|---|---|---|
| 55 kg | Georg Gerstäcker; Germany | Jakob Erbelding; Germany | Albert Reidenbach; Germany |
| 58 kg | Walter Huck; Germany | Artur Zirkel; Germany | Heinrich Zehmer; Germany |
| 62 kg | Karl Völklein; Germany | Gustav Haber; Germany | Georg Schunk; Germany |
| 67.5 kg | Hermann Baruch; Germany | Robert Blech; Germany | Robert Hoffmann; Germany |
| 75+ kg | Friedrich Bräun; Germany | Heinrich Stiefel; Germany | Julius Conter; Germany |
| 82.5 kg | Emil Bräuer; Germany | Julius Baruch; Germany | Jakob Bohrer; Germany |
| 82.5+ kg | Ferdinand Muss; Germany | Karl Rostock; Germany | Willi Presper; Germany |
