= Prvoslav Ilić =

Serbian wrestler

Medal record

Men's wrestling

Representing Yugoslavia

European Championships
Silver medal – second place	1982 Varna	Super-Heavyweight
Bronze medal – third place	1980 Prievidza	Super-Heavyweight

Prvoslav Ilić (born January 25, 1952) is a Serbian former wrestler who competed in the 1980 Moscow Olympics where he won 5th place. Unuci Tamara ilic i Djoksi Ilic i bivsa zena kraljica univerzima i kosmosa BEBA
