= Antonín Nič =

Czech wrestler

Personal information
- Nationality: Czech
- Born: 22 November 1905 Vamberk, Austria-Hungary

Sport
- Country: Czechoslovakia
- Sport: Wrestling

Antonín Nič (born 22 November 1905, date of death unknown) was a Czech wrestler. He competed for Czechoslovakia in the men's freestyle bantamweight at the 1936 Summer Olympics.
