= Johannes Kotkas =

Estonian wrestler (1915–1998)

- Johannes Kotkas in 1952

Personal information
- Born: 3 February 1915 Kodijärve, Governorate of Livonia, Russian Empire
- Died: 8 May 1998 (aged 83) Tallinn, Estonia
- Height: 184 cm (6 ft 0 in)
- Weight: 115 kg (254 lb)

Sport
- Sport: Greco-Roman wrestling
- Club: Dynamo Tallinn
Medal record
Representing the Soviet Union
Olympic Games
Gold medal – first place	1952 Helsinki	+87 kg
World Championships
Silver medal – second place	1953 Naples	+87 kg
World Cup
Gold medal – first place	1956 Istanbul	+87 kg
European Championships
Representing Estonia
Gold medal – first place	1938 Tallinn	+87 kg
Gold medal – first place	1939 Oslo	+87 kg
Representing Soviet Union
Gold medal – first place	1947 Prague	+87 kg

Johannes Kotkas (3 February 1915 – 8 May 1998) was a heavyweight Greco-Roman wrestler from Estonia who won a gold medal at the 1952 Summer Olympics. He held the European title in 1938, 1939 and 1947 and placed second at the 1953 world championships.

== Biography ==
Kotkas first trained in weightlifting and took up wrestling only in 1935, aged 20. He soon became the second-best Estonian heavyweight wrestler, consistently losing to Kristjan Palusalu in the finals of national championships. Palusalu retired around 1938 due to an injury, opening for Kotkas the way to the Estonian and European titles. His career was interrupted by World War II and by the Soviet annexation of Estonia. The Soviet Union rarely competed internationally in the first few years after the war, and hence Kotkas had only a few international victories, such as those at the 1947 European Championships and at the 1952 Olympics, where he defeated all his opponents by fall. Meanwhile, he was unbeatable domestically, winning the Soviet Greco-Roman heavyweight title in 1940, 1943–46, 1948, 1950–53 and 1955–56, and placing second in 1949 and 1954. In 1943–1950 he also competed nationally in freestyle wrestling, sambo, hammer throw, shot put and weightlifting and placed within the podium at least once in each of those disciplines.

Kotkas retired from competitions in 1960 to become a wrestling coach and international referee. In 1961–76 he trained the Estonian wrestling team and from 1976 to middle-1980s worked at Dynamo Tallinn. In 1990 he was made an honorary member of Estonian Olympic Committee. He was also awarded the FILA Gold Star, the highest award by FILA.
