= Voldemar Roolaan =

Estonian wrestler

Voldemar Roolaan (until 1938 Froman; 4 January 1914 – 3 June 1991) was an Estonian wrestler.

He was born in Laitse Rural Municipality, Harju County.

He started sporting in 1929 at the sport club Tallinna Sport. In 1938 he won bronze medal at European Championships. He was 8-times Estonian champion. 1937–1946 he was a member of Estonian national wrestling team.
