= Ștefan Negrișan =

Romanian wrestler

Ştefan Negrişan (born 9 September 1958) is a Romanian former wrestler who competed in the 1984 Summer Olympics. Negrişan won a gold medal the next year at the 1985 Greco-Roman wrestling 68.0 kg World Championship.
