= Väinö Kokkinen =

Finnish wrestler (1899–1967)

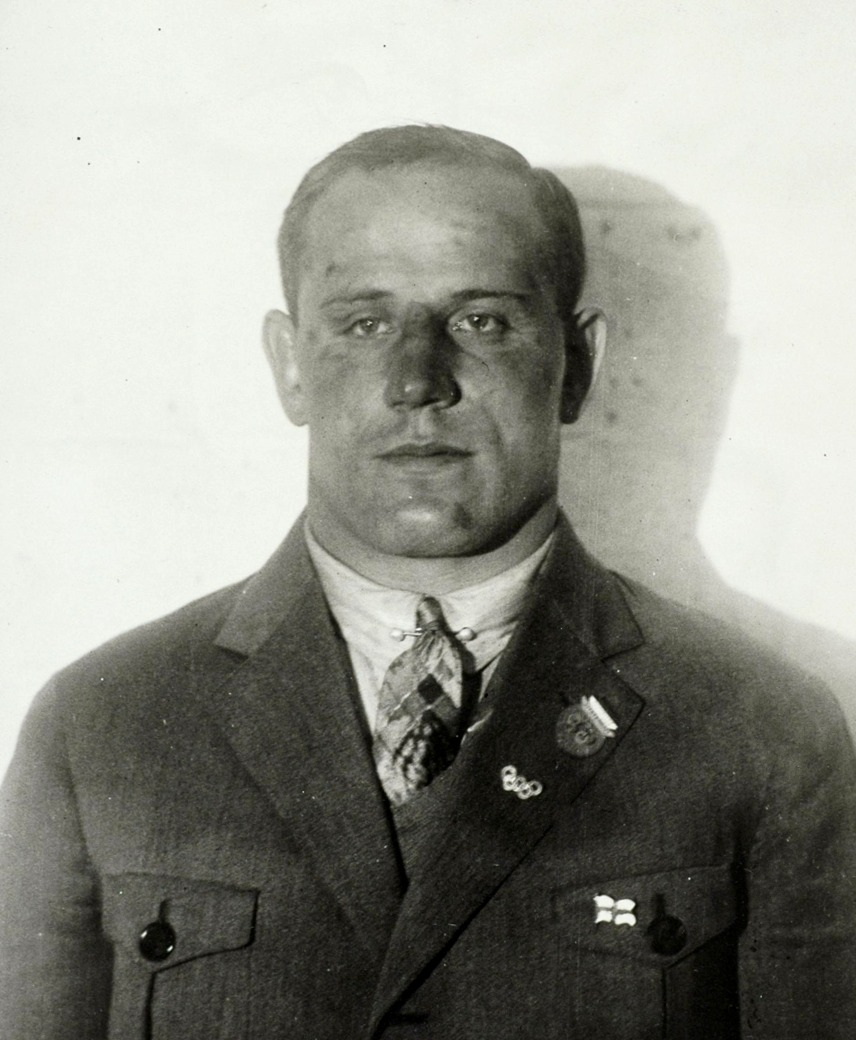
- Väinö Kokkinen at the 1928 Olympics

Personal information
- Born: 25 November 1899 Hollola, Grand Duchy of Finland, Russian Empire
- Died: 27 August 1967 (aged 67) Kouvola, Finland
- Height: 172 cm (5 ft 8 in)
- Weight: 78–85 kg (172–187 lb)

Sport
- Sport: Greco-Roman wrestling
- Club: HKV, Helsinki; HPM, Helsinki
Medal record
Men's Greco-Roman wrestling
Representing Finland
Olympic Games
Gold medal – first place	1928 Amsterdam	75 kg
Gold medal – first place	1932 Los Angeles	79 kg
European Championships
Gold medal – first place	1930 Stockholm	79 kg
Silver medal – second place	1925 Mailand	79 kg
Silver medal – second place	1929 Dortmund	79 kg
Silver medal – second place	1931 Prague	79 kg
Silver medal – second place	1933 Helsinki	87 kg

Väinö Kokkinen (25 November 1899 – 27 August 1967) was a Finnish Greco-Roman wrestler. He won two Olympic gold medals in the middleweight category, in 1928 and 1932, and finished in fourth place in 1936. Between 1925 and 1933 he won one gold and four silver medals at the European championships as well as six national titles (1926, 1929–32 and 1934).

Kokkinen was a blacksmith by profession and fought in the Finnish Civil War. He started training in wrestling in 1921, after moving to Helsinki. He retired in 1936 and ran a successful business in the clothing and hospitality industry. In the 1940s he was also a board member of the sports club Helsingin Jyry.
