= Harald Pettersson =

Swedish wrestler

Personal information
- Nationality: Swedish
- Born: 2 April 1903 Borås, Sweden
- Died: 10 April 1956 (aged 53) Borås, Sweden

Sport
- Sport: Wrestling

Harald Pettersson (2 April 1903 – 10 April 1956) was a Swedish wrestler. He competed in the men's Greco-Roman lightweight at the 1928 Summer Olympics.
