= Roman Kierpacz =

Polish wrestler

Roman Kierpacz (born 5 February 1961 in Siemianowice Śląskie) is a Polish former wrestler who competed in the 1980 Summer Olympics and in the 1988 Summer Olympics.
