= Armand Magyar =

Hungarian wrestler

- Born: 5 February 1898; Budapest, Hungary
- Died: 12 February 1961 (aged 63); Budapest, Hungary

Armand Magyar (5 February 1898 – 12 February 1961) was a Hungarian wrestler. He competed in the Greco-Roman bantamweight at the 1924 Summer Olympics.
