= Giovanni Gozzi =

Italian wrestler (1902–1976)

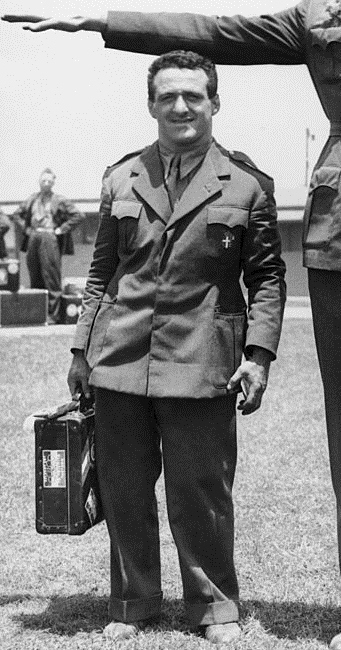
- Giovanni Gozzi at the 1932 Olympics (with 2 m tall Giulio Gaudini to the right)

Personal information
- Born: 19 October 1902 Milan, Italy
- Died: 11 August 1976 (aged 73) Imperia, Italy

Sport
- Sport: Greco-Roman wrestling
- Club: Agamennone, Milano
Medal record
Men's Greco-Roman wrestling
Representing Italy
Olympic Games
| Gold medal – first place | 1932 Los Angeles | Featherweight |
| Bronze medal – third place | 1928 Amsterdam | Bantamweight |

Giovanni Gozzi (19 October 1902 – 11 August 1976) was an Italian Olympic champion in Greco-Roman wrestling.

Gozzi competed at the 1932 Summer Olympics in Los Angeles where he won a gold medal in the featherweight class. He also won a bronze medal at the 1928 Summer Olympics and competed at the 1924 Summer Olympics. He was selected for the 1936 Games, but missed it because of an accident.

At the European championships Gozzi won a gold medal in 1927 in bantamweight, a silver in 1925 in bantamweight, and a bronze in 1934 in featherweight. After retiring from competitions he worked as a wrestling coach.
