= Kustaa Pihlajamäki =

Finnish wrestler (1902–1944)

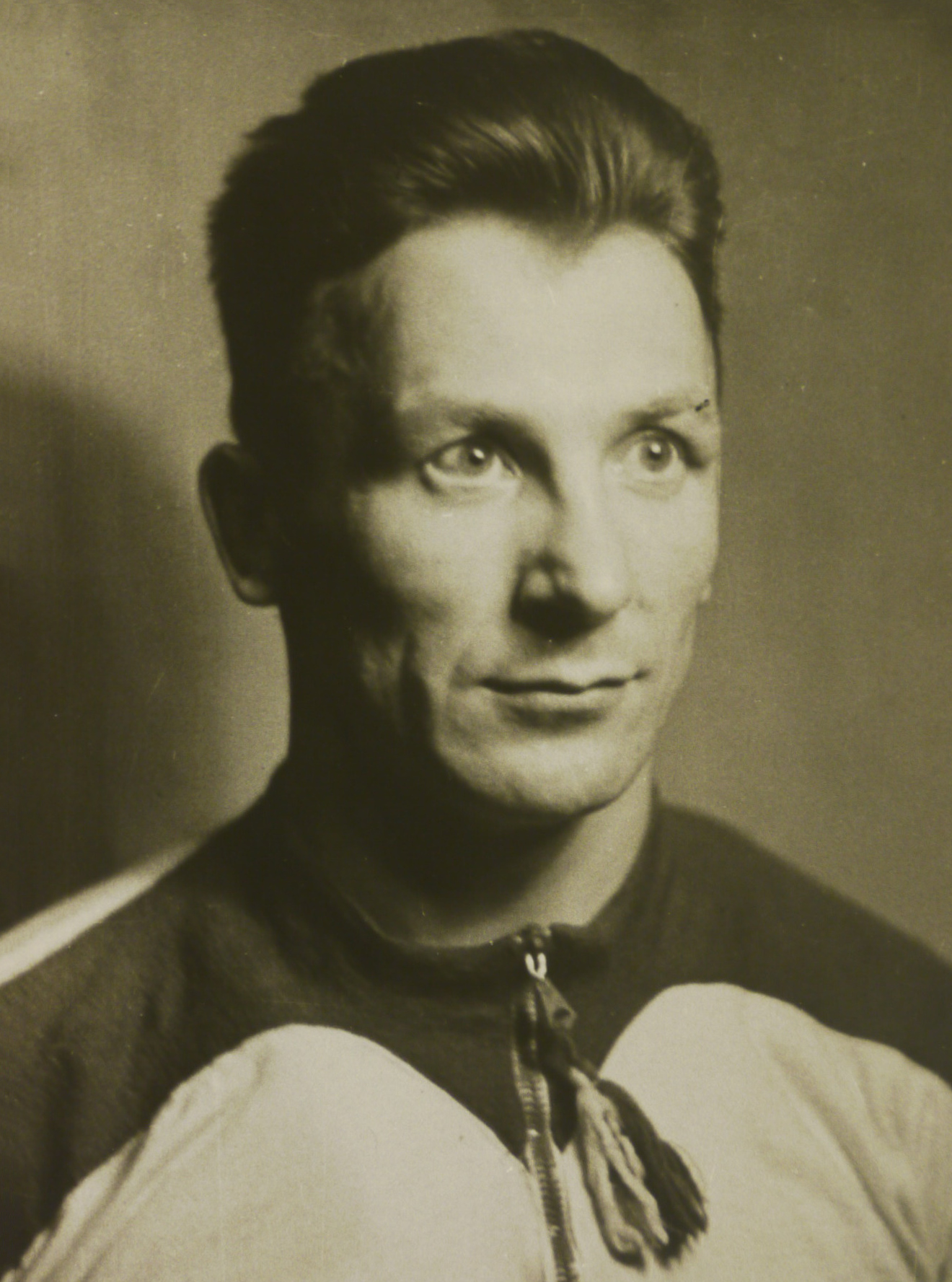

Personal information
- Born: 7 April 1902 Nurmo, Grand Duchy of Finland, Russian Empire
- Died: 10 February 1944 (aged 41) Helsinki, Finland
- Height: 169 cm (5 ft 7 in)
- Weight: 56–66 kg (123–146 lb)

Sport
- Sport: Wrestling
- Club: HKV, Helsinki; Helsingin Poliisi-Voimailijat, Helsinki
Medal record
Representing Finland
Olympic Games
Gold medal – first place	1924 Paris	Freestyle, 56 kg
Gold medal – first place	1936 Berlin	Freestyle, 61 kg
Silver medal – second place	1928 Amsterdam	Freestyle, 61 kg
European championships
Gold medal – first place	1930 Stockholm	Greco-Roman, 61 kg
Gold medal – first place	1931 Prague	Greco-Roman, 61 kg
Gold medal – first place	1933 Helsinki	Greco-Roman, 61 kg
Gold medal – first place	1934 Rome	Greco-Roman, 61 kg
Gold medal – first place	1934 Stockholm	Freestyle, 61 kg
Gold medal – first place	1935 Brussels	Freestyle, 61 kg
Gold medal – first place	1937 Paris	Greco-Roman, 61 kg
Gold medal – first place	1938 Tallinn	Greco-Roman, 61 kg
Gold medal – first place	1939 Oslo	Greco-Roman, 61 kg
Silver medal – second place	1931 Budapest	Freestyle, 61 kg
Silver medal – second place	1937 Munich	Freestyle, 61 kg

Kustaa Kustaanpoika Pihlajamäki (7 April 1902 – 10 February 1944) was a Finnish wrestler. He competed in freestyle wrestling at the 1924, 1928, 1932 and 1936 Olympics and won two gold and one silver medal. Between 1930 and 1943 he won nine European and 28 national titles in Greco-Roman and freestyle wrestling.

Pihlajamäki worked as a policeman in Helsinki from 1925 to 1944, when he died during a Soviet bombing raid. A statue in his honor was installed in Helsinki in 1956, and in 2005 he became the first Finnish wrestler to be inducted into the FILA International Wrestling Hall of Fame. His brothers Arvi and Paavo were also national champions in wrestling, and his cousin Hermanni was an Olympic champion.
