= Wrestling at the 1972 Summer Olympics – Men's Greco-Roman 82 kg =

Men's Greco-Roman 82 kg at the Games of the XX Olympiad
- Venue: Messe München
- Dates: 5–10 September 1972
- Competitors: 20 from 20 nations

Medalists
1st place, gold medalist(s)		Csaba Hegedűs	Hungary
2nd place, silver medalist(s)		Anatoly Nazarenko	Soviet Union
3rd place, bronze medalist(s)		Milan Nenadić	Yugoslavia

The Men's Greco-Roman 82 kg at the 1972 Summer Olympics as part of the wrestling program at the Fairgrounds, Judo and Wrestling Hall.

== Medalists ==
Gold	Csaba Hegedűs; Hungary
Silver	Anatoly Nazarenko; Soviet Union
Bronze	Milan Nenadić; Yugoslavia

== Tournament results ==
The competition used a form of negative points tournament, with negative points given for any result short of a fall. Accumulation of 6 negative points eliminated the wrestler. When only two or three wrestlers remain, a special final round is used to determine the order of the medals.

Legend

- DNA — Did not appear
- TPP — Total penalty points
- MPP — Match penalty points

Penalties

- 0 — Won by Fall, Passivity, Injury and Forfeit
- 0.5 — Won by Technical Superiority
- 1 — Won by Points
- 2 — Draw
- 2.5 — Draw, Passivity
- 3 — Lost by Points
- 3.5 — Lost by Technical Superiority
- 4 — Lost by Fall, Passivity, Injury and Forfeit

=== Round 1 ===
TPP	MPP		Time		MPP	TPP
4	4	Dasrangiin Myagmar (MGL)	6:53	Miroslav Janota (TCH)	0	0
2	2	Matti Laakso (FIN)		Harald Barlie (NOR)	2	2
0	0	Ion Gabor (ROU)	4:02	Jimmy Martinetti (SUI)	4	4
4	4	André Bouchoule (FRA)	8:09	Milan Nenadić (YUG)	0	0
1	1	Sadao Sato (JPN)		John Pedersen (DEN)	3	3
3	3	Frank Hartmann (GDR)		Kiril Dimitrov (BUL)	1	1
3	3	Reinhold Hucker (FRG)		Jan Kårström (SWE)	1	1
3	3	Anatoly Nazarenko (URS)		Csaba Hegedűs (HUN)	1	1
1	1	Adam Ostrowski (POL)		J Robinson (USA)	3	3
0	0	Ali Yağmur (TUR)	2:47	Jesús Blanco (ARG)	4	4

=== Round 2 ===
TPP	MPP		Time		MPP	TPP
8	4	Dasran Myagmarjav (MGL)	2:14	Matti Laakso (FIN)	0	2
2	2	Miroslav Janota (TCH)		Harald Barlie (NOR)	2	4
1	1	Ion Gabor (ROU)		André Bouchoule (FRA)	3	7
8	4	Jimmy Martinetti (SUI)	5:17	Milan Nenadić (YUG)	0	0
5	4	Sadao Sato (JPN)	3:29	Frank Hartmann (GDR)	0	3
6.5	3.5	John Pedersen (DEN)		Kiril Dimitrov (BUL)	0.5	1.5
7	4	Reinhold Hucker (FRG)	5:08	Anatoly Nazarenko (URS)	0	3
4	3	Jan Kårström (SWE)		Csaba Hegedűs (HUN)	1	2
2	1	Adam Ostrowski (POL)		Ali Yağmur (TUR)	3	3
3	0	J Robinson (USA)	8:49	Jesús Blanco (ARG)	4	8

=== Round 3 ===
TPP	MPP		Time		MPP	TPP
2	0	Miroslav Janota (TCH)	2:09	Matti Laakso (FIN)	4	6
6	2	Harald Barlie (NOR)		Ion Gabor (ROU)	2	3
0	0	Milan Nenadić (YUG)	7:16	Sadao Sato (JPN)	4	9
5	2	Frank Hartmann (GDR)		Jan Kårström (SWE)	2	6
4.5	3	Kiril Dimitrov (BUL)		Anatoly Nazarenko (URS)	1	4
2	0	Csaba Hegedűs (HUN)	0:00	Adam Ostrowski (POL)	4	6
7	4	J Robinson (USA)	2:40	Ali Yağmur (TUR)	0	3

=== Round 4 ===
TPP	MPP		Time		MPP	TPP
4	2	Miroslav Janota (TCH)		Ion Gabor (ROU)	2	5
3	3	Milan Nenadić (YUG)		Frank Hartmann (GDR)	1	6
7.5	3	Kiril Dimitrov (BUL)		Csaba Hegedűs (HUN)	1	3
4	0	Anatoly Nazarenko (URS)	1:48	Ali Yağmur (TUR)	4	7

=== Round 5 ===
TPP	MPP		Time		MPP	TPP
7	3	Miroslav Janota (TCH)		Milan Nenadić (YUG)	1	4
9	4	Ion Gabor (ROU)	8:35	Anatoly Nazarenko (URS)	0	4
3		Csaba Hegedűs (HUN)		Bye		

=== Final ===
Results from the preliminary round are carried forward into the final (shown in yellow).

TPP	MPP		Time		MPP	TPP
	3	Anatoly Nazarenko (URS)		Csaba Hegedűs (HUN)	1	
2	1	Csaba Hegedűs (HUN)		Milan Nenadić (YUG)	3	
3	0	Anatoly Nazarenko (URS)	0:00	Milan Nenadić (YUG)	4	7

== Final standings ==
1. Csaba Hegedűs (HUN)
2. Anatoly Nazarenko (URS)
3. Milan Nenadić (YUG)
4. Miroslav Janota (TCH)
5. Ion Gabor (ROU)
6. Frank Hartmann (GDR)
