= Wrestling at the 1976 Summer Olympics – Men's Greco-Roman 82 kg =

Men's Greco-Roman 82 kg at the Games of the XXI Olympiad
- Venue: Maurice Richard Arena
- Dates: 20–24 July 1976
- Competitors: 17 from 17 nations

Medalists
1st place, gold medalist(s)		Momir Petković	Yugoslavia
2nd place, silver medalist(s)		Vladimir Cheboksarov	Soviet Union
3rd place, bronze medalist(s)		Ivan Kolev	Bulgaria

The Men's Greco-Roman 82 kg at the 1976 Summer Olympics as part of the wrestling program were held at the Maurice Richard Arena.

== Medalists ==
Gold	Momir Petković; Yugoslavia
Silver	Vladimir Cheboksarov; Soviet Union
Bronze	Ivan Kolev; Bulgaria

== Tournament results ==
The competition used a form of negative points tournament, with negative points given for any result short of a fall. Accumulation of 6 negative points eliminated the loser wrestler. When only three wrestlers remain, a special final round is used to determine the order of the medals.

Legend

- TF — Won by Fall
- IN — Won by Opponent Injury
- DQ — Won by Passivity
- D1 — Won by Passivity, the winner is passive too
- D2 — Both wrestlers lost by Passivity
- FF — Won by Forfeit
- DNA — Did not appear
- TPP — Total penalty points
- MPP — Match penalty points

Penalties

- 0 — Won by Fall, Technical Superiority, Passivity, Injury and Forfeit
- 0.5 — Won by Points, 8-11 points difference
- 1 — Won by Points, 1-7 points difference
- 2 — Won by Passivity, the winner is passive too
- 3 — Lost by Points, 1-7 points difference
- 3.5 — Lost by Points, 8-11 points difference
- 4 — Lost by Fall, Technical Superiority, Passivity, Injury and Forfeit

=== Round 1 ===
TPP	MPP		Score		MPP	TPP
4	4	Giuseppe Vitucci (ITA)	TF / 4:21	Keijo Manni (FIN)	0	0
0	0	Vladimir Cheboksarov (URS)	TF / 1:18	Kazuhiro Takanishi (JPN)	4	4
4	4	Houshang Montazeralzohour (IRI)	DQ / 5:05	Momir Petković (YUG)	0	0
1	1	Daniel Chandler (USA)	9 - 8	Csaba Hegedűs (HUN)	3	3
4	4	Ibrahim Diop (SEN)	DQ / 7:31	Miroslav Janota (TCH)	0	0
4	4	David Cummings (CAN)	IN / 7:40	Ion Enache (ROU)	0	0
4	4	André Bouchoule (FRA)	2 - 16	Ivan Kolev (BUL)	0	0
0	0	Leif Andersson (SWE)	TF / 2:12	Franz Pitschmann (AUT)	4	4
0		Adam Ostrowski (POL)		Bye		

=== Round 2 ===
TPP	MPP		Score		MPP	TPP
0	0	Adam Ostrowski (POL)	DQ / 7:19	Giuseppe Vitucci (ITA)	4	8
3	3	Keijo Manni (FIN)	9 - 16	Vladimir Cheboksarov (URS)	1	1
4	0	Kazuhiro Takanishi (JPN)	TF / 3:20	Houshang Montazeralzohour (IRI)	4	8
0.5	0.5	Momir Petković (YUG)	14 - 5	Daniel Chandler (USA)	3.5	4.5
6	3	Csaba Hegedűs (HUN)	4 - 10	Miroslav Janota (TCH)	1	1
8	4	David Cummings (CAN)	IN / 6:00	André Bouchoule (FRA)	0	4
1	1	Ion Enache (ROU)	6 - 4	Leif Andersson (SWE)	3	3
0	0	Ivan Kolev (BUL)	TF / 1:22	Franz Pitschmann (AUT)	4	8
4		Ibrahim Diop (SEN)		DNA		

=== Round 3 ===
TPP	MPP		Score		MPP	TPP
4	4	Adam Ostrowski (POL)	D1 / 7:56	Keijo Manni (FIN)	2	5
4	3	Vladimir Cheboksarov (URS)	6 - 6	Momir Petković (YUG)	1	1.5
4	0	Kazuhiro Takanishi (JPN)	TF / 6:49	Daniel Chandler (USA)	4	8.5
2	1	Miroslav Janota (TCH)	7 - 2	André Bouchoule (FRA)	3	7
4	3	Ion Enache (ROU)	8 - 8	Ivan Kolev (BUL)	1	1
3		Leif Andersson (SWE)		Bye		

=== Round 4 ===
TPP	MPP		Score		MPP	TPP
4	1	Leif Andersson (SWE)	9 - 6	Adam Ostrowski (POL)	3	7
8.5	3.5	Keijo Manni (FIN)	6 - 15	Kazuhiro Takanishi (JPN)	0.5	4.5
5	1	Vladimir Cheboksarov (URS)	8 - 3	Miroslav Janota (TCH)	3	5
2.5	1	Momir Petković (YUG)	3 - 2	Ion Enache (ROU)	3	7
1		Ivan Kolev (BUL)		Bye		

=== Round 5 ===
TPP	MPP		Score		MPP	TPP
4	3	Ivan Kolev (BUL)	7 - 14	Vladimir Cheboksarov (URS)	1	6
4	0	Leif Andersson (SWE)	TF / 0:29	Kazuhiro Takanishi (JPN)	4	8.5
3.5	1	Momir Petković (YUG)	8 - 2	Miroslav Janota (TCH)	3	8

=== Round 6 ===
TPP	MPP		Score		MPP	TPP
7	3	Ivan Kolev (BUL)	5 - 9	Momir Petković (YUG)	1	4.5
8	4	Leif Andersson (SWE)	TF / 2:07	Vladimir Cheboksarov (URS)	0	6

=== Final ===
Results from the preliminary round are carried forward into the final (shown in yellow).

TPP	MPP		Score		MPP	TPP
	3	Vladimir Cheboksarov (URS)	6 - 6	Momir Petković (YUG)	1	
	3	Ivan Kolev (BUL)	7 - 14	Vladimir Cheboksarov (URS)	1	4
6	3	Ivan Kolev (BUL)	5 - 9	Momir Petković (YUG)	1	2

== Final standings ==
1. Momir Petković (YUG)
2. Vladimir Cheboksarov (URS)
3. Ivan Kolev (BUL)
4. Leif Andersson (SWE)
5. Miroslav Janota (TCH)
6. Kazuhiro Takanishi (JPN)
7. Ion Enache (ROU)
8. Adam Ostrowski (POL)
