= 2027 World Rally Championship =

55th running of the World Rally Championship

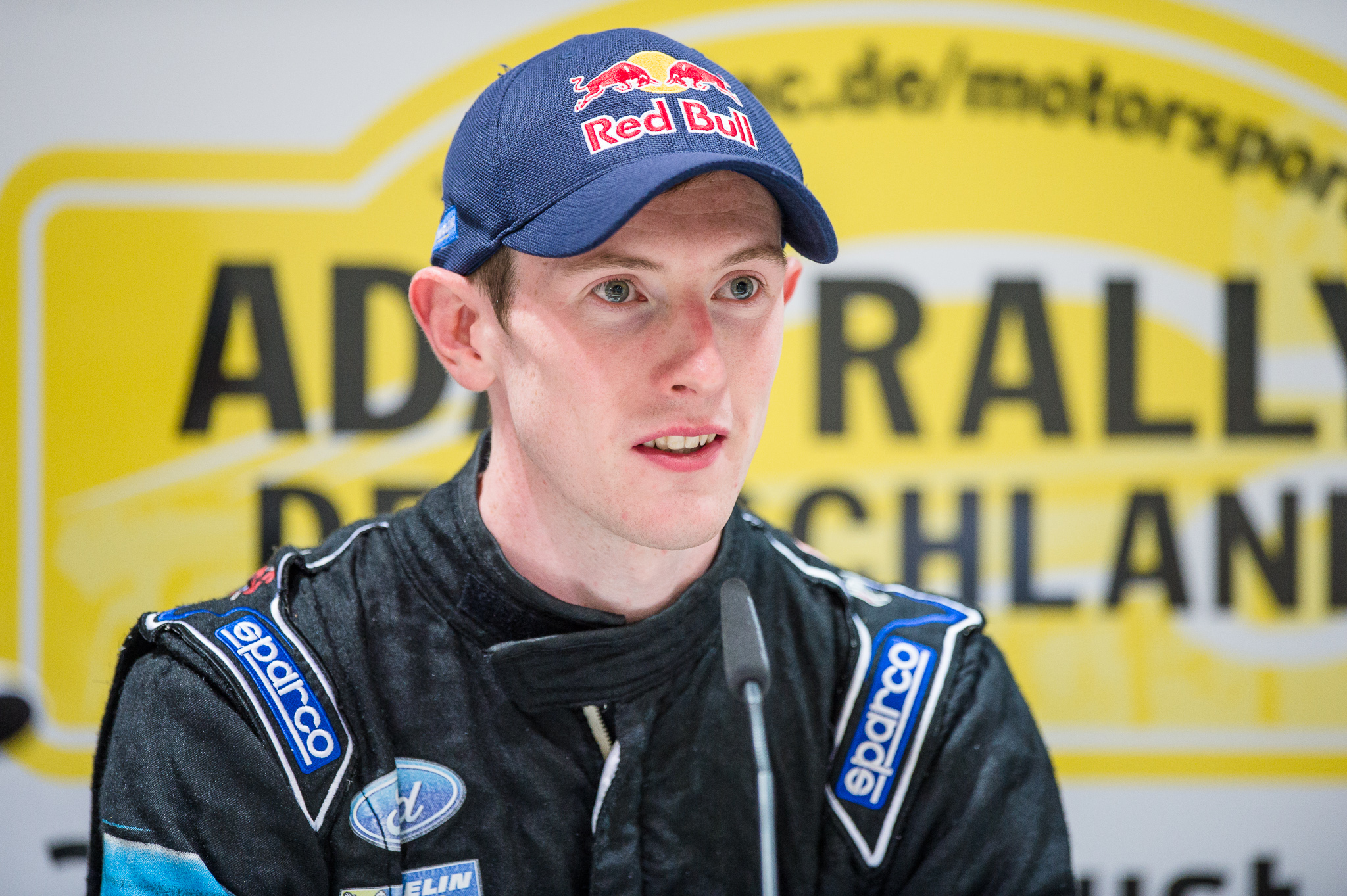
Elfyn Evans is the defending drivers' champion.

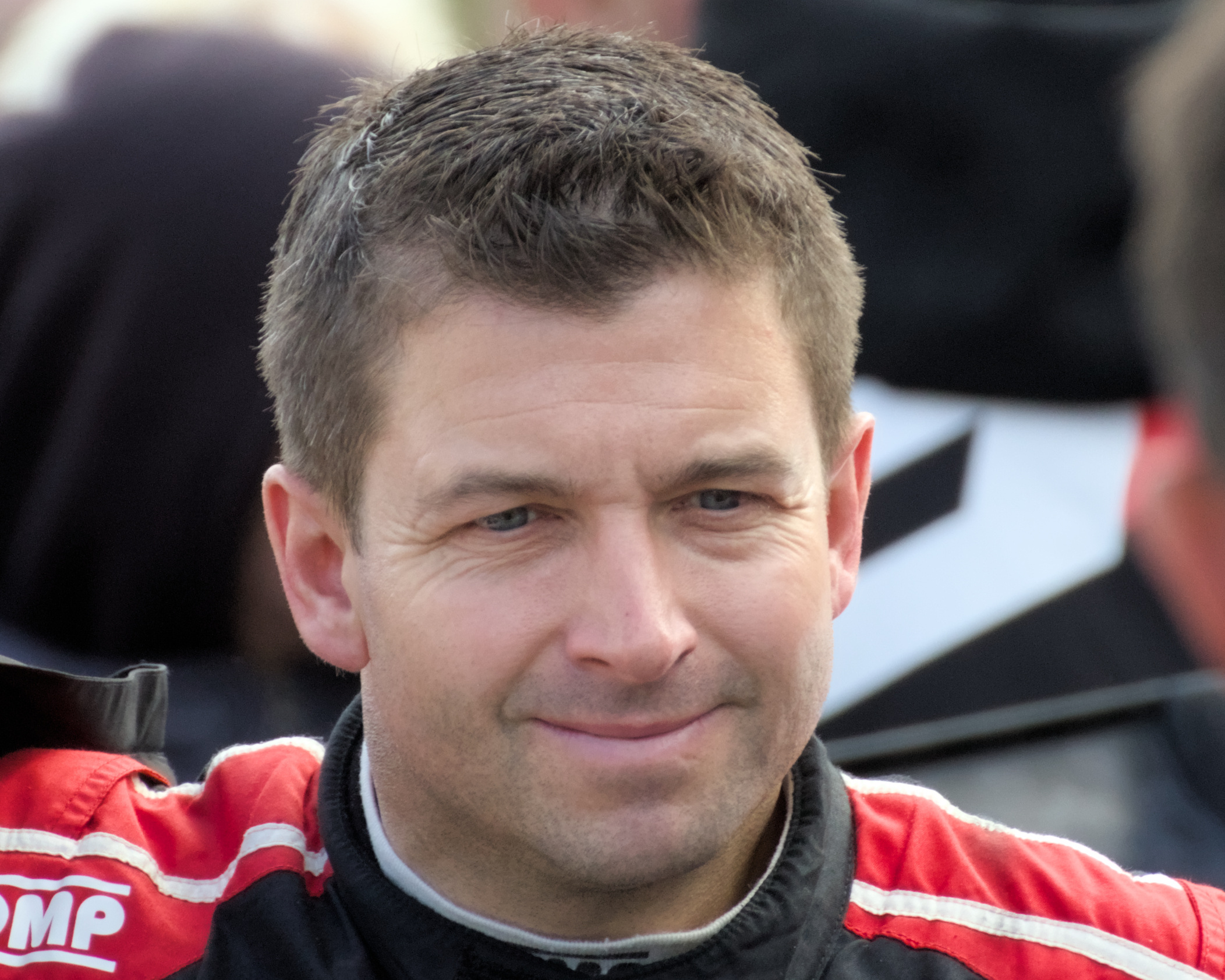
Scott Martin is the defending co-drivers' champion.

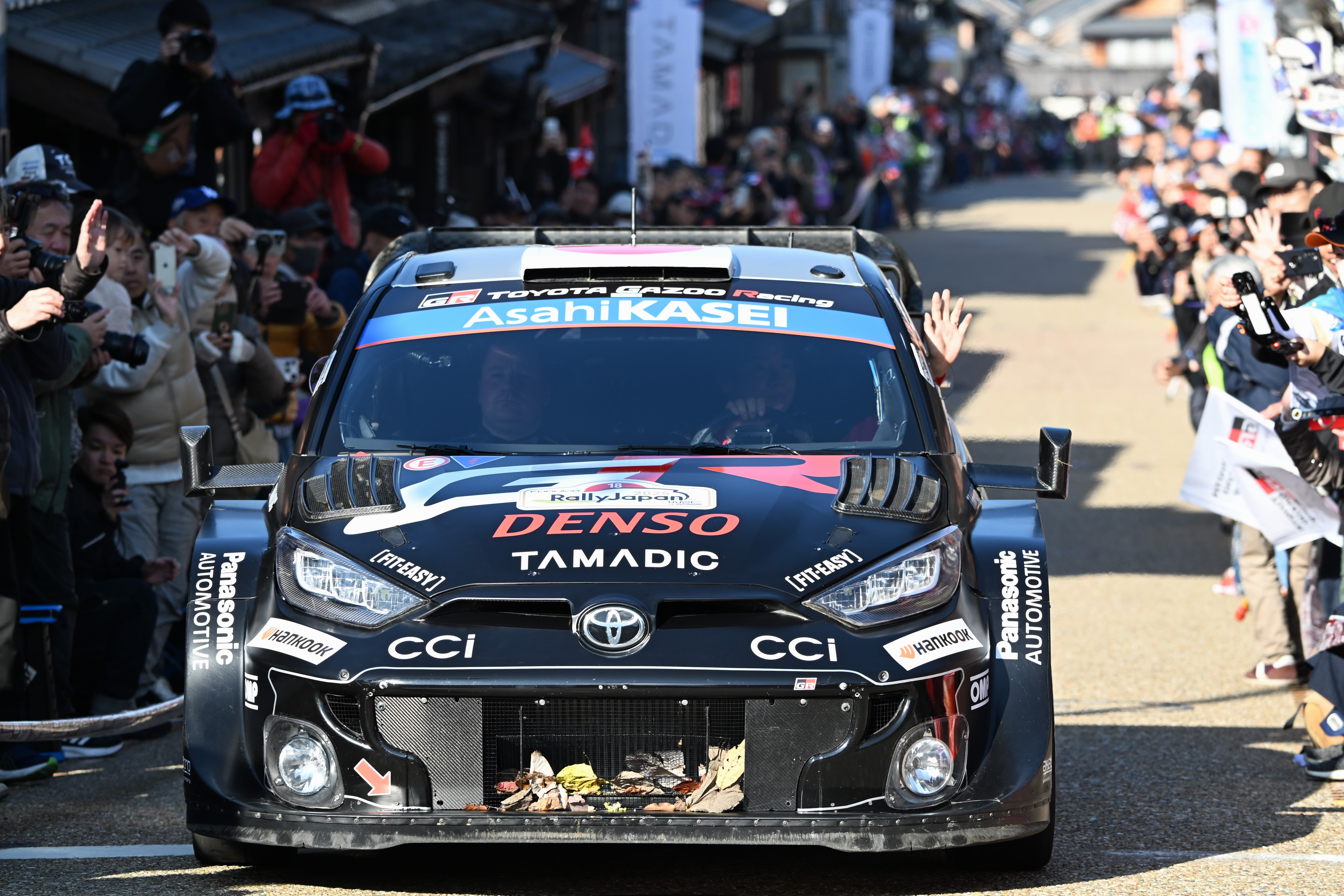
Toyota Gazoo Racing WRT (GR Yaris Rally1 pictured) are the defending manufacturers' champions.

The 2027 FIA World Rally Championship is an upcoming motorsport season that is set to be the 55th season of the World Rally Championship, an international rallying series organised by the Fédération Internationale de l'Automobile (FIA) and WRC Promoter GmbH. Teams and crews compete for the World Rally Championships for Drivers, Co-drivers and Constructors. Crews are free to compete in cars complying with Groups Rally1 to Rally5 regulations; however, only manufacturers competing with WRC27 cars are eligible to score points in the constructors' championship. The championship is set to begin in January 2027 with the Monte Carlo Rally and due to be concluded in November 2027 with the Rally Saudi Arabia. The series would be supported by the WRC2 and WRC3 categories at every round of the championship and by Junior WRC at selected events.

Elfyn Evans and Scott Martin are the reigning drivers' and co-drivers' champions, having secured the 2026 championship at the 2026 Rally Italia Sardegna. Toyota are the defending manufacturers' champions.

== Calendar ==
A map showing the locations of the rallies in the 2027 championship. Event headquarters are marked with black dots.

The 2027 season is set to be contested over fifteen rounds across Europe, Africa, Asia, North America and South America.

Round	Start date	Finish date	Rally	Rally headquarters	Surface	Stages	Distance	Ref.
1	21 January	24 January	(Monaco) Rallye Automobile Monte Carlo	Gap, Provence-Alpes-Côte d'Azur, France	Mixed (Note: The Monte Carlo Rally is run on a tarmac and snow surface.)	18	353.57 km	
2	18 February	21 February	Rally Sweden	Umeå, Västerbotten County, Sweden	Snow	18	307.08 km	
3	18 March	21 March	Safari Rally Kenya	Nairobi, Nairobi County, Kenya	Gravel	TBA	TBA	
4	8 April	11 April	Croatia Rally	Rijeka, Primorje-Gorski Kotar County, Croatia	Tarmac	TBA	TBA	
5	6 May	9 May	(Spain) Rally Islas Canarias	Las Palmas, Gran Canaria, Spain	Tarmac	TBA	TBA	
6	3 June	6 June	Rally Japan	Toyota, Aichi, Japan	Tarmac	TBA	TBA	
7	24 June	27 June	Acropolis Rally Greece	Loutraki, Corinthia, Greece	Gravel	TBA	TBA	
8	8 July	11 July	(Italy) Rally d'Italia	Rome, Italy	Tarmac	TBA	TBA	
9	22 July	25 July	Rally Estonia	Tartu, Tartu County, Estonia	Gravel	TBA	TBA	
10	29 July	1 August	Rally Finland	Jyväskylä, Central Finland, Finland	Gravel	TBA	TBA	
11	26 August	29 August	(United States) Rally US	Knoxville, Tennessee, United States	Gravel	TBA	TBA	
12	30 September	3 October	(United Kingdom) Rally Scotland	Aberdeen, Scotland, Great Britain	Gravel	TBA	TBA	
13	21 October	24 October	Rally del Paraguay	Encarnación, Itapúa, Paraguay	Gravel	TBA	TBA	
14	4 November	7 November	Rally Chile	Concepción, Biobío, Chile	Gravel	TBA	TBA	
15	25 November	28 November	Rally Saudi Arabia	Jeddah, Mecca Province, Saudi Arabia	Gravel	TBA	TBA	

=== Calendar changes ===
- Rally de Portugal was under contract to hold an event in the season, but the rally was dropped from the calendar due to scheduling conflicts with other events.
- Rally Italia Sardegna is set to be replaced by the Rally di Roma Capitale on the calendar. The new event is set to be headquartered in Rome and contested on a tarmac surface.
- For the first time since 1988, the championship is scheduled to return to the United States with the inauguration of the Rally US. The rally is set to be a gravel event and is expected to be based in Knoxville, Tennessee.
- The championship is set to return to Great Britain with the calendar newcomer Rally Scotland based in Aberdeen. This would mark the end of an eight-year absence for the country, having previously held a WRC event in 2019 with the Wales Rally GB.
- Rally Saudi Arabia is scheduled to return to the calendar after the 2026 event was removed from the championship in response to the war in Iran.

== Entrants ==
The following entrants are set to contest the constructor's championship under Rally1 or Rally2-WRC-Kit regulations. All crews use tyres provided by Hankook.

Constructor entries
Constructor	Entrant	Car	No.	Driver name	Co-driver name
Ford	(United Kingdom) M-Sport Ford WRT	TBA	TBA	TBA	TBA
Ford	(United Kingdom) M-Sport Ford WRT	TBA	TBA	TBA	TBA
Project Rally One	(Belgium) TBA	TBA	TBA	TBA	TBA
Project Rally One	(Belgium) TBA	TBA	TBA	TBA	TBA
RMC Motorsport	WRT Rally1 Spain	TBA	TBA	TBA	TBA
RMC Motorsport	WRT Rally1 Spain	TBA	TBA	TBA	TBA
Toyota	(Japan) Gazoo Racing Toyota	Toyota GR Yaris Rally1	8	(Estonia) Ott Tänak	(Estonia) Martin Järveoja
Toyota	(Japan) Gazoo Racing Toyota	Toyota GR Yaris Rally1	18	(Japan) Takamoto Katsuta	(Republic of Ireland) Aaron Johnston
Toyota	(Japan) Gazoo Racing Toyota	Toyota GR Yaris Rally1	69	(Finland) Kalle Rovanperä	(Finland) Jonne Halttunen
Toyota	(Japan) Toyota Racing	Toyota GR Celica Rally1	5	(Finland) Sami Pajari	(Finland) Marko Salminen
Toyota	(Japan) Toyota Racing	Toyota GR Celica Rally1	33	(United Kingdom) Elfyn Evans	(United Kingdom) Scott Martin
Toyota	(Japan) Toyota Racing	Toyota GR Celica Rally1	99	(Sweden) Oliver Solberg	(United Kingdom) Elliott Edmondson

=== Team changes ===
- M-Sport is set to compete with a kit-car upgraded from its existing Ford Fiesta Rally2.
- Project Rally One, launched by Belgian circuit racing team Prospeed Competition, is set to enter into selected rallies in the 2027 championship with two Rally1 cars of their own construction. Their car's design resembles a Porsche Macan road car, however neither the build project or entering team receives official support from the marque.
- WRT Rally1 Spain, a new tuner team collaboration formed by the Spanish motorsport company RMC Motorsport and the Spanish national motorsport federation (RFEDA), is set to make its championship debut at the 2027 Croatia Rally.
- Toyota announced their plan to enter two teams each competing with their own car built to the new regulations. Toyota Racing is set to compete with the newly-built GR Celica Rally1, while Gazoo Racing is set to compete in the championship with the GR Yaris Rally1. The entrant name changes came amidst Toyota's decision to restructure its racing divisions across several categories including the World Rally Championship and the World Endurance Championship.

=== Driver changes ===
- Sami Pajari and Marko Salminen are set to move from Toyota's second team to Toyota Racing, joining the reigining champions Elfyn Evans and Scott Martin, and last year runners-up Oliver Solberg and Elliott Edmondson.
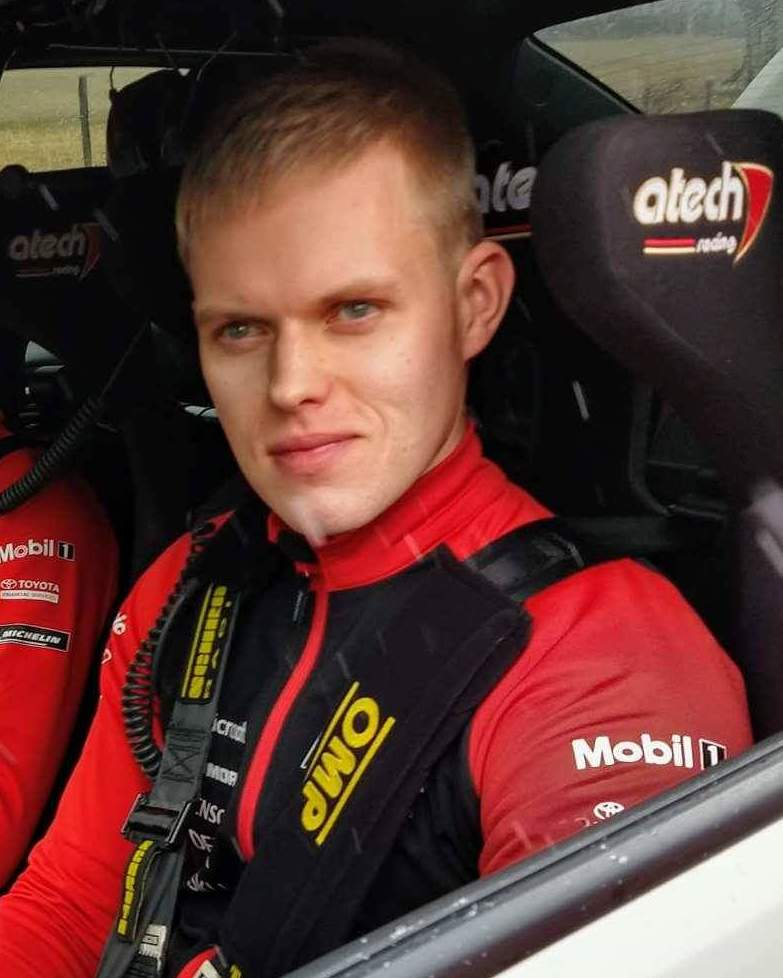
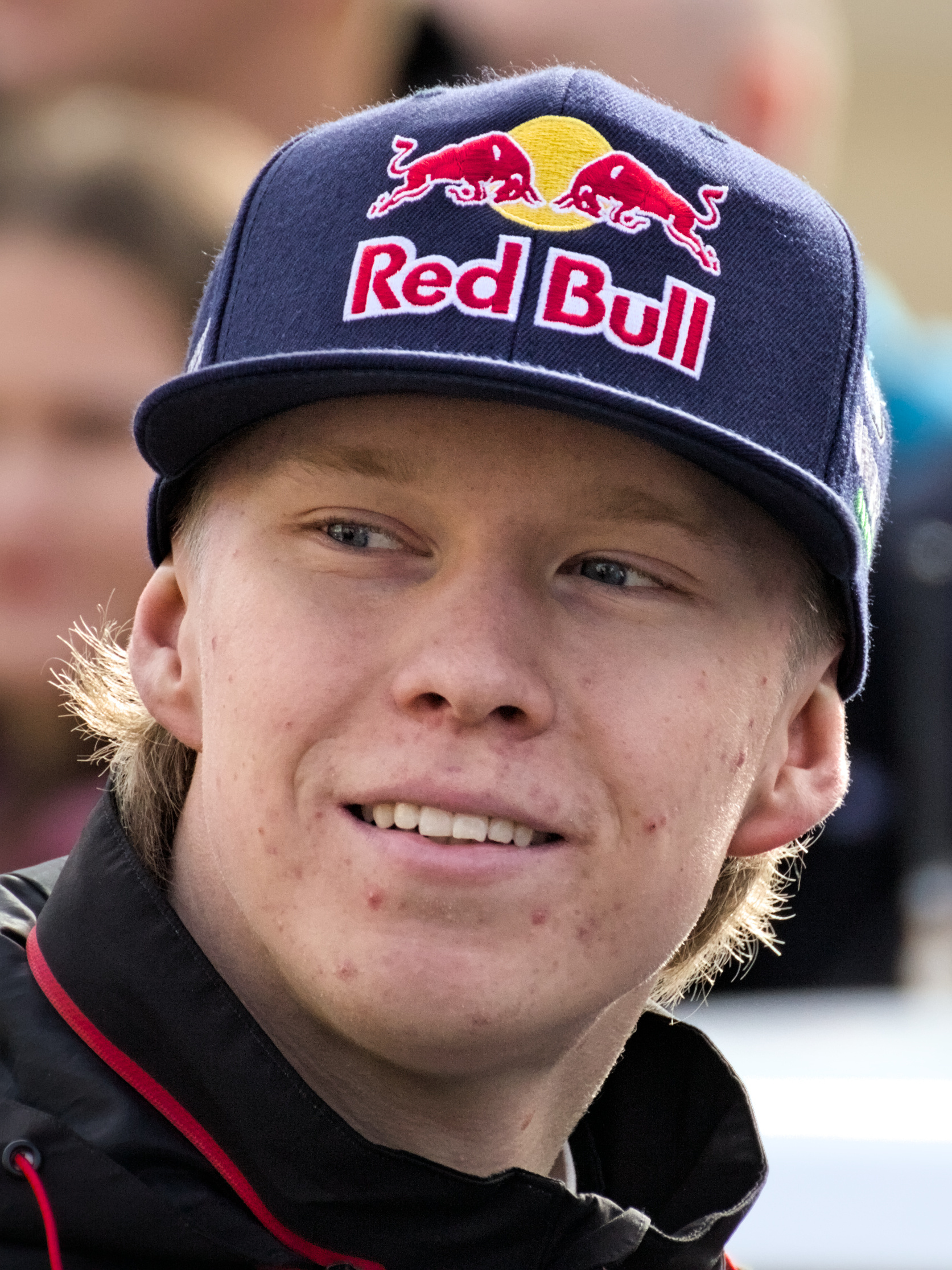
Ott Tänak (left) and Kalle Rovanperä (right) are set to make their return to the championship after a one-year absence.
- The 2019 champions Ott Tänak and Martin Järveoja are due to come back with Gazoo Racing Toyota, having previously driven for Hyundai in 2025. They are due to be joined by Takamoto Katsuta and Aaron Johnston to contest as the team's full-time crews. Two-time champions Kalle Rovanperä and Jonne Halttunen are also due to return to the championship with the team, but they would be run a part-time basis.
- Esapekka Lappi announced his retirement from professional rally following the end of the 2026 Rally Chile.

== Regulation changes ==
The championship introduced two new sets of technical regulations for Rally1 category cars to replace the outgoing regulations used between 2022 and 2026. These regulations are intended to be a stop-gap for the 2027 and 2028 seasons ahead of a planned update in 2029. The first set of these regulations, known as "WRC27" employ engines, suspension, running gear and brakes from the Rally2 category while incorporating bespoke bodywork. Existing Rally2 manufacturers will have the option to homologate a WRC Kit which allowed for an upgraded aerodynamics package to be applied to Rally2 cars and thus be eligible to compete in the top category. The WRC Kit has a fixed price of €7500 to keep costs down.

The Manufacturers' championship was renamed to be the World Rally Championship for Constructors, while a new title known as the World Rally Championship for Teams is to be introduced. The Teams' championship is open to privateer teams competing with a Rally1 car built to WRC27 regulations. Entries must compete in seven events nominated by the entrant, which must include one round outside Europe and the final round, Rally Saudi Arabia.

== Results and standings ==
=== Scoring system ===
Points are awarded to the top ten classified finishers in each event. In the manufacturers' championship, teams are eligible to nominate three crews to score points, but these points are only awarded to the top two classified finishers representing a manufacturer and driving a WRC27-specification Rally1 car. There are also five bonus points awarded to the winners in an accumulated standings across all Sunday stages, four points for second place, three for third, two for fourth and one for fifth. The same points scale is awarded to the five fastest crews of the Power Stage as well.

Position	1st	2nd	3rd	4th	5th	6th	7th	8th	9th	10th
Overall	25	17	15	12	10	8	6	4	2	1
Sunday	5	4	3	2	1	—N/a				
Power Stage	5	4	3	2	1	—N/a				
