= Central European Zone Rally Championship =

- Category: Super 2000; Group N
- Country: Europe
- Inaugural season: 2005
- Drivers' champion: refer table
- Official website: CEZ

The Central European Zone Rally Championship is a regional rally championship organised by the FIA Central European Zone, consisting of multiple national rally events forming a regional championship structure for Central European competitors.

== History ==
There are four separate championships contested under the Central European Zone banner, and unlike other FIA Zone rally series there is no overall champion. The classes are Production Cars (for Group N vehicles), Class 2 (for Super 2000), 2WD (for FIA classes 5 through 10 which includes Super 1600) and Historic. The Historic class is run largely separate from the other three championships with its own calendar, although it does share some events.

Events are held in Hungary, Austria, Croatia, Slovenia, Czech Republic, Poland, Italy, Slovakia and Serbia.

== List of events ==
2014 calendar events, sourced from:

- Miskolc Rally, Hungary
- Wechselland Rallye, Austria
- Delta Rally, Croatia
- Historic Vltava Rallye, Czech Republic
- Rally Saturnus, Slovenia
- Rally Velenje, Slovenia
- Rally Hustopeče, Czech Republic
- Rajd Rzeszowski, Poland
- Rallye Weiz, Austria
- Rally del Friuli Venezia Giulia, Italy
- Rally Košice, Slovakia
- Croatia Rally, Croatia
- Mecsek Rallye, Hungary

== Champions ==
Year	S1600		Group N		Group A		Historic	
Year	Driver	Car	Driver	Car	Driver	Car	Driver	Car
2005	(Czech Republic) Josef Peták	Renault Clio S1600	(Slovenia) Andrej Jereb	Subaru WRX STi	(Serbia and Montenegro) Čedomir Brkič	Mitsubishi Evo VII	(Italy) Folco Gamberucci	Lancia Fulvia HF
2006	(Czech Republic) Josef Peták	Renault Clio S1600	(Czech Republic) Václav Pech	Mitsubishi Evo IX	(Austria) Raimund Baumschlager	Mitsubishi Evo VIII	(Italy) Vittorio Policante	Opel Kadett GT/E
2007	S2000: (Poland) Czopik Tomasz; S2000: (Italy) Scandola Umberto; S1600: (Poland) Grzyb Grzegorz	Fiat Abarth Grande Punto; Fiat Abarth Grande Punto; Suzuki Swift S1600	(Czech Republic) Václav Pech	Mitsubishi Evo IX	(Slovenia) Rihtar Miha	Mitsubishi Evo V	(Austria) Gruber Sepp	Ford Escort RS
Year	Class 2		Production Car		2WD		Historic	
2008	S2000: (Poland) Michał Sołowow; S1600: (Italy) Carlo Fornasiero	Peugeot 207 S2000; Renault Clio S1600	(Slovenia) Darko Peljhan	Mitsubishi Evo IX	(Italy) Rodolfo Cosimi	Renault Clio Sport	(Hungary) Andras Kovesdan	Porsche 911SC
2009	S2000: (Poland) Michał Sołowow; S1600: (Czech Republic) Jiří Vlček	Peugeot 207 S2000; Peugeot 206 S1600	(Czech Republic) Václav Pech	Mitsubishi Evo IX	(Italy) Andrea Torlasco	Renault Clio R3	(Hungary) Andras Kovesdan	Porsche 911SC
2010	(Poland) Michał Sołowow	Ford Fiesta S2000	(Poland) Kajetan Kajetanowicz	Subaru WRX STi	(Poland) Michał Bebenek	Citroën C2 R2 Max	(Czech Republic) Miroslav Janota	Opel Kadett C GTE
2011	(Poland) Michał Sołowow	Ford Fiesta S2000	(Poland) Wojciech Chuchala	Subaru WRX STi	(Poland) Jan Chmielewski	Citroën DS3 R3T	(Italy) Maurizio Pagella	Porsche 911S
2012	(Poland) Kajetan Kajetanowicz	Subaru Impreza STi R4	(Hungary) Zoltán Bessenyey	Subaru WRX STi	(Poland) Radoslaw Typa	Ford Fiesta R2	(Hungary) Ferenc Wirtmann	Ford Escort RS2000
2013	(Hungary) Norbert Herczig	Škoda Fabia S2000	(Slovenia) Asja Zupanc	Mitsubishi Evo IX	(Slovenia) Aleks Humar	Renault Clio R3	(Hungary) Ferenc Wirtmann	Ford Escort RS2000
2014	(Hungary) Norbert Herczig	Škoda Fabia S2000	(Croatia) Juraj Šebalj	Mitsubishi Evo IX	(Slovenia) Rok Turk	Peugeot 208 R2	(Italy) Paolo Pasutti	Porsche 911
2015	(Hungary) János Puskádi	Škoda Fabia S2000	(Croatia) Juraj Šebalj	Mitsubishi Evo IX	(Slovenia) Aleks Humar (Hungary) Zoltán Bessenyey	Renault Clio R3T; Renault Clio R3T	(Hungary) Ferenc Wirtmann	Ford Escort RS2000
2016					(Slovenia) Rok Turk	Peugeot 208 R2	(Hungary) Ferenc Wirtmann	Ford Escort RS2000
2017							(Hungary) László Mekler	Alfa Romeo 1750 GTAm
2018	(Slovenia) Andras Hadik	Ford Fiesta R5	(Poland) Slawomir Kurdys	Subaru Impreza WRX STi	(Slovenia) Aleks Humar	Peugeot 208 R2	(Hungary) László Mekler	Alfa Romeo Alfetta GTV6
2019	(Slovenia) Rok Turk	Hyundai i20 R5	(Slovakia) Lukáš Lapdavský	Subaru Impreza STi	(Serbia) Goran Rabasovic	Citroën C2 R2 Max	(Italy) Luigi Battistolli	Lancia Delta Integrale 16V
2020	(Poland) Grzegorz Grzyb	Škoda Fabia Rally2 evo			(Poland) Maciej Lubiak	Peugeot 208 R2		
2021	(Czech Republic) Jan Kopecký (Slovenia) Rok Turk	Škoda Fabia Rally2 evo Hyundai i20 R5	(Slovakia) Tomáš Kukučka	Mitsubishi Evo VI	(Czech Republic) René Dohnal	Peugeot 208 Rally4	(Italy) Paolo Pasutti	Porsche 911 Carrera RS 3.0
2022	(Poland) Grzegorz Grzyb	Škoda Fabia Rally2 evo	(Slovakia) Vlastimil Majerčák	Ford Fiesta Rally3	(Croatia) Viliam Prodan	Renault Clio Rally4	(Hungary) Tibor Érdi, Jr.	Ford Sierra RS Cosworth

Recent editions of the championship continue to be organised under the FIA Central European Zone, with multiple rallies held annually across Austria, Croatia, Czech Republic, Hungary, Poland, Slovakia and Slovenia.
