= Kiril Dimitrov =

Kiril Dimitrov may refer to:

- Kiril Dimitrov (wrestler), Bulgarian wrestler
- Kiril Dimitrov (footballer), Bulgarian footballer
