= Hucker =

Hucker is an English and German surname. Notable people with the surname include:

- Charles Hucker (1919–1994), American historian
- Ernie Hucker (1887–1970), Australian rugby league player
- George J. Hucker (1893–1988), American microbiologist
- Peter Hucker (born 1959), English footballer
- Reinhold Hucker (born 1948), German sport wrestler
- Tom Hucker (born 1967), American politician
