= List of World Rally Championship rallies =

The list of World Rally Championship rallies includes all rally competitions that have been part of the FIA World Rally Championship (WRC) schedule. It does not include rallies that were only part of the FIA Cup for Drivers, the predecessor to the drivers' world championship, such as the Arctic Rally, the Scottish Rally and the Southern Cross Rally.

== History ==
From 1994 to 1996, the World Rally Championship had an event rotation system. The Swedish Rally did not have full WRC status in the 1994 season, the Rally Finland in 1995, and the Monte Carlo Rally and the RAC Rally in 1996. Instead, these rallies were part of the 2-litre "Formula 2" championship that was contested from 1993 to 1999.

The World Rally Championship had a new "Round Rotation" System in 2009 and 2010 in order to attract candidate rallies to have a chance to be a WRC event.

After the second rotation system, World Rally Championship had a calendar with 13 rallies until 2019, with some changes such as Rally of Poland replacing Acropolis Rally of Greece in 2014, and Rally Turkey replacing Rally of Poland in 2018. Hopes for a calendar consisted of 14 rounds again were diminished due to the cancelation of 2016 Rally China and 2019 Rally Australia.

In 2020 and 2021 the World Rally Championship was largely affected by the COVID-19 pandemic, resulting in many rallies being canceled, mostly outside Europe, and new European rounds entering the calendar, such as Rally Estonia, Rally Monza, Croatia Rally and Ypres Rally Belgium.

== Rallies by location ==
The list includes only the rallies that have been finally taken place and not those that had been cancelled.

Location	Rally	Headquarters	Rally Surface	No of Rallies	WRC years
Argentina	Rally Argentina	Villa Carlos Paz (Note: Previously Córdoba.)	Gravel	37	1980–1981, 1983–1994, 1996–2009, 2011–2019
Australia	Rally Australia	Coffs Harbour (Note: From 1989–2006, Rally Australia was previously held at Perth, Western Australia, and in Kingscliff, New South Wales in 2009.)	Gravel	25	1989–1993, 1995–2006, 2009, 2011, 2013–2018 (Note: In 2019, Rally Australia was cancelled due to a bushfire emergency.)
Austria	Österreichische Alpenfahrt	Baden	Gravel	1	1973
Belgium	Ypres Rally	Ypres	Tarmac	2	2021–2022
Brazil	Rallye do Brasil	São Paulo	Gravel	2	1981–1982 (Note: In 1981, Rallye do Brasil was only part of the drivers' championship.)
Bulgaria	Rally Bulgaria	Borovets	Tarmac	1	2010
Canada	Rally of the Rideau Lakes	Smiths Falls	Gravel	1	1974
Canada	Critérium du Québec	Montreal	Gravel	3	1977–1979
Chile	**Rally Chile**	Talcahuano	Gravel	**5**	2019, 2023–2027
China	Rally China	Beijing	Gravel	1	1999 (Note: In 2016, Rally China was cancelled due to weather damage.)
Croatia	Croatia Rally	Zagreb	Tarmac	**5**	2021–2024, 2026–2027
(Ivory Coast) Côte d'Ivoire	Rallye Côte d'Ivoire	Abidjan	Gravel	15	1978–1992 (Note: From 1982 to 1992, Rallye Côte d'Ivoire was only part of the drivers' championship.)
Cyprus	Cyprus Rally	Limassol	Tarmac/Gravel (Note: Previously Gravel until 2006.)	8	2000–2006, 2009
Estonia	**Rally Estonia**	Tartu	Gravel	**6**	2020–2023, 2025–2027
Finland	Arctic Rally	Rovaniemi	Snow	1	2021
Finland	**Rally Finland** (formerly 1000 Lakes Rally)	Jyväskylä	Gravel	**52**	1973–1994, 1996–2019, 2021–2027 (Note: In 1980, 1000 Lakes Rally was only part of the drivers' championship.)
France	Tour de Corse – Rallye de France	Bastia	Tarmac	40	1973–1995, 1997–2008, 2015–2019
France	Rallye de France Alsace	Strasbourg	Tarmac	5	2010–2014
Germany	Rallye Deutschland	Bostalsee (Note: Previous headquarters include Trier and Saarbrücken.)	Tarmac	17	2002–2008, 2010–2019
Germany/ Austria/ Czech Republic	**Central European Rally**	Passau	Tarmac	3	2023–2025
Greece	**Acropolis Rally**	Lamia (Note: Had previously held in Athens and Loutraki.)	Gravel	**44**	1973, 1975–1994, 1996–2009, 2011–2013, 2021–2027 (Note: In 1974, Acropolis Rally was cancelled due to the oil crisis.)
Indonesia	Rally Indonesia	Medan	Gravel	2	1996–1997
(Republic of Ireland) Ireland/ Northern Ireland	Rally Ireland	Sligo	Tarmac	2	2007, 2009
Italy	Rallye Sanremo (formerly Rallye Sanremo – Rallye d'Italia)	Sanremo	Tarmac	29	1973–1985, 1987–1994, 1996–2003
Italy	**Rally Italia Sardegna** (formerly Rally d'Italia Sardegna)	Alghero (Note: Has had different headquarters.)	Gravel	**22**	2004–2009, 2011–2026
Italy	Rally Monza	Monza	Tarmac	2	2020–2021
Italy	Rally di Roma Capitale	Rome	Tarmac	0 (not yet held)	2027
Japan	**Rally Japan**	Nagoya (Note: Rally Japan was previously held at Tokachi, Hokkaido and Sapporo.)	Gravel/Tarmac (Note: Previously Gravel until 2010.)	**10**	2004–2008, 2010, 2022–2027
Jordan	Jordan Rally	Amman	Gravel	3	2008, 2010–2011
Kenya	**Safari Rally**	Great Rift Valley; Naivasha; Nakuru County	Gravel	**33**	1973–1994, 1996–2002, 2021–2027
Latvia	Rally Latvia	Liepāja	Gravel	1	2024
Mexico	Rally Mexico	Leon	Gravel	17	2004–2008, 2010–2020, 2023
Monaco/ France	**Monte Carlo Rally**	Gap (Note: Has had different headquarters.)	Tarmac with Ice/Snow	**49**	1973, (Note: In 1974, Monte Carlo Rally was cancelled due to the oil crisis.) 1975–1995, 1997–2008, 2012–2027
Morocco	Rallye du Maroc	Casablanca	Tarmac/Gravel	3	1973, 1975–1976
New Zealand	Rally New Zealand	Auckland	Gravel	32	1977, 1979–1980, 1982–1995, 1997–2008, 2010, 2012, 2022 (Note: From 1987 to 1992, Rally New Zealand was only part of the drivers' championship.)
Norway	Rally Norway	Hamar	Ice/Snow-covered Gravel	2	2007, 2009
Paraguay	**Rally del Paraguay**	Encarnación	Gravel	**2**	2025–2027
Poland	Rally Poland	Mikołajki	Gravel	7	1973, 2009, 2014–2017, 2024
Portugal	**Rally de Portugal** (Note: The rally's name from 1967–2005 was Rallye de Portugal due to the relocation of the rally from Porto.)	Matosinhos (Note: Has had different headquarters.)	Gravel	**46**	1973–1995, 1997–2001, 2007, 2009–2019, 2021–2026
Saudi Arabia	Rally Saudi Arabia	Jeddah	Gravel	1	2025, 2027 (Note: In 2026, Rally Saudi Arabia was cancelled due to the Iran war.)
Spain	Rally de Catalunya	Salou (Note: The Rally Catalunya was previously held from Costa Brava and was called Rallye Catalunya from 1991–2004.)	Tarmac & Gravel	30	1991–1993, 1995–2019, 2021–2022 (Note: In 1991 and 1992, Rally Catalunya was only part of the drivers' championship.)
Spain	**Rally Islas Canarias**	Las Palmas	Tarmac	**2**	2025–2027
Sweden	**Rally Sweden** (formerly Swedish Rally)	Umeå (Note: Previously Karlstad and Torsby.)	Ice/Snow-covered Gravel	**48**	1973, 1975–1989, 1991–1993, 1995–2008, 2010–2020, 2022–2027 (Note: The Swedish Rally was cancelled due to the oil crisis in 1974, and due to lack of snow in 1990. From 1980 to 1984, and from 1989 to 1992, the rally was only part of the drivers' championship.)
Turkey	Rally of Turkey	Marmaris (Note: Previously Istanbul and Antalya.)	Gravel	9	2003–2006, 2008, 2010, 2018–2020
United Kingdom	Wales Rally GB (formerly RAC Rally and Rally of Great Britain)	Deeside (Note: Has had different headquarters.)	Gravel	46	1973–1995, 1997–2019
United Kingdom	Rally Scotland	Aberdeen	Gravel	0 (not yet held)	2027
United States	Press-on-Regardless Rally	Detroit	Gravel	2	1973–1974
United States	Olympus Rally	Tacoma	Gravel	3	1986–1988 (Note: In 1986, Olympus Rally was only part of the drivers' championship.)
United States	Rally US	Knoxville	Gravel	0 (not yet held)	2027

Note: bold text indicates 2026 rallies.

== Rallies by season ==
=== 1970s ===
Rnd	1973	1974	1975	1976	1977	1978	1979
1	Monaco	Portugal	Monaco	Monaco	Monaco	Monaco	Monaco
2	Sweden	Kenya	Sweden	Sweden	Sweden	Sweden	Sweden
3	Portugal	Finland	Kenya	Portugal	Portugal	Kenya	Portugal
4	Kenya	Italy	Greece	Kenya	Kenya	Portugal	Kenya
5	Morocco	Canada	Morocco	Greece	New Zealand	Greece	Greece
6	Greece	United States	Portugal	Morocco	Greece	Finland	New Zealand
7	Poland	Great Britain	Finland	Finland	Finland	Canada	Finland
8	Finland	France	Italy	Italy	Canada	Italy	Canada
9	Austria		France	France	Italy	Côte d'Ivoire	Italy
10	Italy		Great Britain	Great Britain	France	France	France
11	United States				Great Britain	Great Britain	Great Britain
12	Great Britain						Côte d'Ivoire
13	France						

=== 1980s ===
Rnd	1980	1981	1982	1983	1984	1985	1986	1987	1988	1989
1	Monaco	Monaco	Monaco	Monaco	Monaco	Monaco	Monaco	Monaco	Monaco	Sweden
2	Sweden	Sweden	Sweden	Sweden	Sweden	Sweden	Sweden	Sweden	Sweden	Monaco
3	Portugal	Portugal	Portugal	Portugal	Portugal	Portugal	Portugal	Portugal	Portugal	Portugal
4	Kenya	Kenya	Kenya	Kenya	Kenya	Kenya	Kenya	Kenya	Kenya	Kenya
5	Greece	France	France	France	France	France	France	France	France	France
6	Argentina	Greece	Greece	Greece	Greece	Greece	Greece	Greece	Greece	Greece
7	Finland	Argentina	New Zealand	New Zealand	New Zealand	New Zealand	New Zealand	United States	United States	New Zealand
8	New Zealand	Brazil	Brazil	Argentina	Argentina	Argentina	Argentina	New Zealand	New Zealand	Argentina
9	Italy	Finland	Finland	Finland	Finland	Finland	Finland	Argentina	Argentina	Finland
10	France	Italy	Italy	Italy	Italy	Italy	Côte d'Ivoire	Finland	Finland	Australia
11	Great Britain	Côte d'Ivoire	Côte d'Ivoire	Côte d'Ivoire	Côte d'Ivoire	Côte d'Ivoire	Great Britain	Côte d'Ivoire	Côte d'Ivoire	Italy
12	Côte d'Ivoire	Great Britain	Great Britain	Great Britain	Great Britain	Great Britain	United States	Italy	Italy	Côte d'Ivoire
13								Great Britain	Great Britain	Great Britain

=== 1990s ===
Rnd	1990	1991	1992	1993	1994	1995	1996	1997	1998	1999
1	Monaco	Monaco	Monaco	Monaco	Monaco	Monaco	Sweden	Monaco	Monaco	Monaco
2	Portugal	Sweden	Sweden	Sweden	Portugal	Sweden	Kenya	Sweden	Sweden	Sweden
3	Kenya	Portugal	Portugal	Portugal	Kenya	Portugal	Indonesia	Kenya	Kenya	Kenya
4	France	Kenya	Kenya	Kenya	France	France	Greece	Portugal	Portugal	Portugal
5	Greece	France	France	France	Greece	New Zealand	Argentina	Spain	Spain	Spain
6	New Zealand	Greece	Greece	Greece	Argentina	Australia	Finland	France	France	France
7	Argentina	New Zealand	New Zealand	Argentina	New Zealand	Spain	Australia	Argentina	Argentina	Argentina
8	Finland	Argentina	Argentina	New Zealand	Finland	Great Britain	Italy	Greece	Greece	Greece
9	Australia	Finland	Finland	Finland	Italy		Spain	New Zealand	New Zealand	New Zealand
10	Italy	Australia	Australia	Australia	Great Britain			Finland	Finland	Finland
11	Côte d'Ivoire	Italy	Italy	Italy				Indonesia	Italy	China
12	Great Britain	Côte d'Ivoire	Côte d'Ivoire	Spain				Italy	Australia	Italy
13		Spain	Spain	Great Britain				Australia	Great Britain	Australia
14		Great Britain	Great Britain					Great Britain		Great Britain

=== 2000s ===
Rnd	2000	2001	2002	2003	2004	2005	2006	2007	2008	2009
1	Monaco	Monaco	Monaco	Monaco	Monaco	Monaco	Monaco	Monaco	Monaco	Ireland
2	Sweden	Sweden	Sweden	Sweden	Sweden	Sweden	Sweden	Sweden	Sweden	Norway
3	Kenya	Portugal	France	Turkey	Mexico	Mexico	Mexico	Norway	Mexico	Cyprus
4	Portugal	Spain	Spain	New Zealand	New Zealand	New Zealand	Spain	Mexico	Argentina	Portugal
5	Spain	Argentina	Cyprus	Argentina	Cyprus	Italy	France	Portugal	Jordan	Argentina
6	Argentina	Cyprus	Argentina	Greece	Greece	Cyprus	Argentina	Argentina	Italy	Italy
7	Greece	Greece	Greece	Cyprus	Turkey	Turkey	Italy	Italy	Greece	Greece
8	New Zealand	Kenya	Kenya	Germany	Argentina	Greece	Greece	Greece	Turkey	Poland
9	Finland	Finland	Finland	Finland	Finland	Argentina	Germany	Finland	Finland	Finland
10	Cyprus	New Zealand	Germany	Australia	Germany	Finland	Finland	Germany	Germany	Australia
11	France	Italy	Italy	Italy	Japan	Germany	Japan	New Zealand	New Zealand	Spain
12	Italy	France	New Zealand	France	Great Britain	Great Britain	Cyprus	Spain	Spain	Great Britain
13	Australia	Australia	Australia	Spain	Italy	Japan	Turkey	France	France	
14	Great Britain	Great Britain	Great Britain	Great Britain	France	France	Australia	Japan	Japan	
15					Spain	Spain	New Zealand	Ireland	Great Britain	
16					Australia	Australia	Great Britain	Great Britain		

=== 2010s ===
Rnd	2010	2011	2012	2013	2014	2015	2016	2017	2018	2019
1	Sweden	Sweden	Monaco	Monaco	Monaco	Monaco	Monaco	Monaco	Monaco	Monaco
2	Mexico	Mexico	Sweden	Sweden	Sweden	Sweden	Sweden	Sweden	Sweden	Sweden
3	Jordan	Portugal	Mexico	Mexico	Mexico	Mexico	Mexico	Mexico	Mexico	Mexico
4	Turkey	Jordan	Portugal	Portugal	Portugal	Argentina	Argentina	France	France	France
5	New Zealand	Italy	Argentina	Argentina	Argentina	Portugal	Portugal	Argentina	Argentina	Argentina
6	Portugal	Argentina	Greece	Greece	Italy	Italy	Italy	Portugal	Portugal	Chile
7	Bulgaria	Greece	New Zealand	Italy	Poland	Poland	Poland	Italy	Italy	Portugal
8	Finland	Finland	Finland	Finland	Finland	Finland	Finland	Poland	Finland	Italy
9	Germany	Germany	Germany	Germany	Germany	Germany	Germany	Finland	Germany	Finland
10	Japan	Australia	Great Britain	Australia	Australia	Australia	France	Germany	Turkey	Germany
11	France	France	France	France	France	France	Spain	Spain	Great Britain	Turkey
12	Spain	Spain	Italy	Spain	Spain	Spain	Great Britain	Great Britain	Spain	Great Britain
13	Great Britain	Great Britain	Spain	Great Britain	Great Britain	Great Britain	Australia	Australia	Australia	Spain

=== 2020s ===
Rnd	2020	2021	2022	2023	2024	2025	2026	2027
1	Monaco	Monaco	Monaco	Monaco	Monaco	Monaco	Monaco	Monaco
2	Sweden	(Finland) Arctic	Sweden	Sweden	Sweden	Sweden	Sweden	Sweden
3	Mexico	Croatia	Croatia	Mexico	Kenya	Kenya	Kenya	Kenya
4	Estonia	Portugal	Portugal	Croatia	Croatia	Spain	Croatia	Croatia
5	Turkey	Italy	Italy	Portugal	Portugal	Portugal	Spain	Spain
6	Italy	Kenya	Kenya	Italy	Italy	Italy	Portugal	Japan
7	(Italy) Monza	Estonia	Estonia	Kenya	Poland	Greece	Japan	Greece
8		Belgium	Finland	Estonia	Latvia	Estonia	Greece	Italy
9		Greece	Belgium	Finland	Finland	Finland	Estonia	Estonia
10		Finland	Greece	Greece	Greece	Paraguay	Finland	Finland
11		Spain	New Zealand	Chile	Chile	Chile	Paraguay	United States
12		(Italy) Monza	Spain	Central Europe	Central Europe	Central Europe	Chile	(United Kingdom) Great Britain
13			Japan	Japan	Japan	Japan	Italy	Paraguay
14						Saudi Arabia		Chile
15								Saudi Arabia

== Evolution of the calendar ==
Legend	Meaning
Yes	Active events
Maybe	Valid only for 2 Litres Cup
No	Cancelled rallies

Rally	73	74	75	76	77	78	79	80	81	82	83	84	85	86	87	88	89	90	91	92	93	94	95	96	97	98	99	00	01	02	03	04	05	06	07	08	09	10	11	12	13	14	15	16	17	18	19	20	21	22	23	24	25	26	27	Tot.
(United Kingdom) Wales Rally GB	Yes	Yes	Yes	Yes	Yes	Yes	Yes	Yes	Yes	Yes	Yes	Yes	Yes	Yes	Yes	Yes	Yes	Yes	Yes	Yes	Yes	Yes	Yes	Maybe	Yes	Yes	Yes	Yes	Yes	Yes	Yes	Yes	Yes	Yes	Yes	Yes	Yes	Yes	Yes	Yes	Yes	Yes	Yes	Yes	Yes	Yes	Yes	No	No							46
(France) Tour de Corse	Yes	Yes	Yes	Yes	Yes	Yes	Yes	Yes	Yes	Yes	Yes	Yes	Yes	Yes	Yes	Yes	Yes	Yes	Yes	Yes	Yes	Yes	Yes	Maybe	Yes	Yes	Yes	Yes	Yes	Yes	Yes	Yes	Yes	Yes	Yes	Yes							Yes	Yes	Yes	Yes	Yes									40
Portugal Rally	Yes	Yes	Yes	Yes	Yes	Yes	Yes	Yes	Yes	Yes	Yes	Yes	Yes	Yes	Yes	Yes	Yes	Yes	Yes	Yes	Yes	Yes	Yes	Maybe	Yes	Yes	Yes	Yes	Yes						Yes		Yes	Yes	Yes	Yes	Yes	Yes	Yes	Yes	Yes	Yes	Yes	No	Yes	Yes	Yes	Yes	Yes	Yes		46
Rally Finland	Yes	Yes	Yes	Yes	Yes	Yes	Yes	Yes	Yes	Yes	Yes	Yes	Yes	Yes	Yes	Yes	Yes	Yes	Yes	Yes	Yes	Yes	Maybe	Yes	Yes	Yes	Yes	Yes	Yes	Yes	Yes	Yes	Yes	Yes	Yes	Yes	Yes	Yes	Yes	Yes	Yes	Yes	Yes	Yes	Yes	Yes	Yes	No	Yes	Yes	Yes	Yes	Yes	Yes	Yes	53
(Italy) Rally di Sanremo	Yes	Yes	Yes	Yes	Yes	Yes	Yes	Yes	Yes	Yes	Yes	Yes	Yes		Yes	Yes	Yes	Yes	Yes	Yes	Yes	Yes	Maybe	Yes	Yes	Yes	Yes	Yes	Yes	Yes	Yes																									29
(Kenya) Safari Rally	Yes	Yes	Yes	Yes	Yes	Yes	Yes	Yes	Yes	Yes	Yes	Yes	Yes	Yes	Yes	Yes	Yes	Yes	Yes	Yes	Yes	Yes	Maybe	Yes	Yes	Yes	Yes	Yes	Yes	Yes																		No	Yes	Yes	Yes	Yes	Yes	Yes	Yes	36
(United States) Press-on-Regardless Rally	Yes	Yes																																																						2
(Monaco) Monte Carlo Rally	Yes		Yes	Yes	Yes	Yes	Yes	Yes	Yes	Yes	Yes	Yes	Yes	Yes	Yes	Yes	Yes	Yes	Yes	Yes	Yes	Yes	Yes	Maybe	Yes	Yes	Yes	Yes	Yes	Yes	Yes	Yes	Yes	Yes	Yes	Yes				Yes	Yes	Yes	Yes	Yes	Yes	Yes	Yes	Yes	Yes	Yes	Yes	Yes	Yes	Yes	Yes	50
(Greece) Acropolis Rally	Yes		Yes	Yes	Yes	Yes	Yes	Yes	Yes	Yes	Yes	Yes	Yes	Yes	Yes	Yes	Yes	Yes	Yes	Yes	Yes	Yes	Maybe	Yes	Yes	Yes	Yes	Yes	Yes	Yes	Yes	Yes	Yes	Yes	Yes	Yes	Yes		Yes	Yes	Yes	Yes							Yes	Yes	Yes	Yes	Yes	Yes	Yes	45
Rally Sweden	Yes		Yes	Yes	Yes	Yes	Yes	Yes	Yes	Yes	Yes	Yes	Yes	Yes	Yes	Yes	Yes		Yes	Yes	Yes	Maybe	Yes	Yes	Yes	Yes	Yes	Yes	Yes	Yes	Yes	Yes	Yes	Yes	Yes	Yes		Yes	Yes	Yes	Yes	Yes	Yes	Yes	Yes	Yes	Yes	Yes	No	Yes	Yes	Yes	Yes	Yes	Yes	50
(Morocco) Rallye du Maroc	Yes		Yes	Yes																																																				3
Rally Poland	Yes																																				Yes					Yes	Yes	Yes	Yes							Yes				7
(Austria) Österreichische Alpenfahrt	Yes																																																							1
(Canada) Rally Rideau Lakes		Yes																																																						1
(Canada) Critérium du Quebec					Yes	Yes	Yes																																																	3
Rally New Zealand					Yes		Yes	Yes		Yes	Yes	Yes	Yes	Yes	Yes	Yes	Yes	Yes	Yes	Yes	Yes	Yes	Yes	Maybe	Yes	Yes	Yes	Yes	Yes	Yes	Yes	Yes	Yes	Yes	Yes	Yes		Yes		Yes								No		Yes						32
(Ivory Coast) Rallye Côte d'Ivoire (Note: From 1982 to 1992 valid only for driver championship.)						Yes	Yes	Yes	Yes	Yes	Yes	Yes	Yes	Yes	Yes	Yes	Yes	Yes	Yes	Yes																																				15
Rally Argentina								Yes	Yes		Yes	Yes	Yes	Yes	Yes	Yes	Yes	Yes	Yes	Yes	Yes	Yes	Maybe	Yes	Yes	Yes	Yes	Yes	Yes	Yes	Yes	Yes	Yes	Yes	Yes	Yes	Yes		Yes	Yes	Yes	Yes	Yes	Yes	Yes	Yes	Yes	No								37
Rally Brazil									Yes	Yes																																														2
(United States) Olympus Rally														Yes	Yes	Yes																																								3
Rally Australia																	Yes	Yes	Yes	Yes	Yes	Maybe	Yes	Yes	Yes	Yes	Yes	Yes	Yes	Yes	Yes	Yes	Yes	Yes			Yes		Yes		Yes	Yes	Yes	Yes	Yes	Yes	No									25
(Spain) Rally Catalunya																			Yes	Yes	Yes	Maybe	Yes	Yes	Yes	Yes	Yes	Yes	Yes	Yes	Yes	Yes	Yes	Yes	Yes	Yes	Yes	Yes	Yes	Yes	Yes	Yes	Yes	Yes	Yes	Yes	Yes		Yes	Yes						30
Rally Indonesia																								Yes	Yes																															2
Rally China																											Yes																	No												1
Cyprus Rally																												Yes	Yes	Yes	Yes	Yes	Yes	Yes			Yes																			8
(Germany) Rallye Deutschland																														Yes	Yes	Yes	Yes	Yes	Yes	Yes		Yes	Yes	Yes	Yes	Yes	Yes	Yes	Yes	Yes	Yes	No								17
Rally of Turkey																															Yes	Yes	Yes	Yes		Yes		Yes								Yes	Yes	Yes								9
(Italy) Rally di Sardegna																																Yes	Yes	Yes	Yes	Yes	Yes		Yes	Yes	Yes	Yes	Yes	Yes	Yes	Yes	Yes	Yes	Yes	Yes	Yes	Yes	Yes	Yes		22
Rally Mexico																																Yes	Yes	Yes	Yes	Yes		Yes	Yes	Yes	Yes	Yes	Yes	Yes	Yes	Yes	Yes	Yes			Yes					17
Rally Japan																																Yes	Yes	Yes	Yes	Yes		Yes										No	No	Yes	Yes	Yes	Yes	Yes	Yes	12
Rally Norway																																			Yes		Yes																			2
(Republic of Ireland) Rally Ireland																																			Yes		Yes	Yes																		3
Rally Jordan																																				Yes		Yes																		2
(France) Rallye d'Alsace																																						Yes	Yes	Yes	Yes	Yes														5
Rally Bulgaria																																						Yes																		1
Rally Chile																																															Yes	No	No		Yes	Yes	Yes	Yes	Yes	6
Rally Estonia																																																Yes	Yes	Yes	Yes		Yes	Yes	Yes	7
(Italy) Rally Monza																																																Yes	Yes							2
(Finland) Arctic Rally																																																	Yes							1
Croatia Rally																																																	Yes	Yes	Yes	Yes		Yes	Yes	6
(Belgium) Ypres Rally																																																No	Yes	Yes						2
Central Europe Rally																																																			Yes	Yes	Yes			3
(Latvia) Rally Liepāja																																																				Yes				1
(Spain) Rally Islas Canarias																																																					Yes	Yes	Yes	3
Rally del Paraguay																																																					Yes	Yes	Yes	3
Rally Saudi Arabia																																																					Yes	No	Yes	2
(Italy) Rally di Roma Capitale																																																							Yes	1
(United States) Rally US																																																							Yes	1
(United Kingdom) Rally Scotland																																																							Yes	1
Total	13	8	10	10	11	11	12	12	12	12	12	12	12	12	13	13	13	12	14	14	13	10	8	9	14	13	14	14	14	14	14	16	16	16	16	15	12	13	13	13	13	13	13	13	13	13	13	7	12	13	13	13	14	13	15	696
