= 2027 Junior WRC Championship =

The 2027 FIA Junior WRC Championship is set to be the fourteenth season of Junior WRC, a rallying championship governed by the Fédération Internationale de l'Automobile, running in support of the World Rally Championship. The championship is due to feature five events, beginning in February at the Rally Sweden and concluding in September at the Rally Scotland.

== Calendar ==
A map showing the locations of the rallies in the 2027 Junior WRC Championship. Click on the dot to see the rally details.

Round	Start date	Finish date	Rally	Rally headquarters	Surface	Stages	Distance	Ref.
1	18 February	21 February	Rally Sweden	Umeå, Västerbotten County, Sweden	Snow	TBA	TBA	
2	8 April	11 April	Croatia Rally	Rijeka, Primorje-Gorski Kotar County, Croatia	Tarmac	TBA	TBA	
3	8 July	11 July	(Italy) Rally d'Italia	Rome, Italy	Tarmac	TBA	TBA	
4	29 July	1 August	Rally Finland	Jyväskylä, Central Finland, Finland	Gravel	TBA	TBA	
5	30 September	3 October	(United Kingdom) Rally Scotland	Aberdeen, Scotland, Great Britain	Gravel	TBA	TBA	

== Results and standings ==
=== Season summary ===
Round	Event	Winning driver	Winning co-driver	Winning time	Report	Ref.
1	Rally Sweden				Report	
2	Croatia Rally				Report	
3	(Italy) Rally d'Italia				Report	
4	Rally Finland				Report	
5	(United Kingdom) Rally Scotland				Report	
