= David Cummings (wrestler) =

Canadian wrestler (1948–1985)

Personal information
- Born: 24 September 1948 Ottawa, Ontario, Canada
- Died: 30 April 1985 (aged 36) Calgary, Alberta, Canada

Sport
- Sport: Wrestling

David Cummings (24 September 1948 – 30 April 1985) was a Canadian wrestler. He competed in the men's Greco-Roman 82 kg at the 1976 Summer Olympics. He was killed in an ultra-light aircraft crash.
