= John Pedersen (wrestler) =

Danish wrestler

Personal information
- Nationality: Danish
- Born: 31 March 1948 (age 78) Guldborgsund, Denmark

Sport
- Sport: Wrestling

John Pedersen (born 31 March 1948) is a Danish wrestler. He competed in the men's Greco-Roman 82 kg at the 1972 Summer Olympics.
