= Anatoly Nazarenko =

Kazakhstani wrestler (born 1948)

Medal record

Men's Greco-Roman wrestling

Representing the Soviet Union

Olympic Games
Silver medal – second place	1972 Munich	82 kg

Anatoly Ivanovich Nazarenko (Анатолий Иванович Назаренко, born 19 December 1948 in Alma-Ata) is a Kazakhstani former wrestler who competed in the 1972 Summer Olympics.
