= Vladimir Cheboksarov =

Russian wrestler (born 1951)

Medal record

Men's Greco-Roman wrestling

Representing the Soviet Union

Olympic Games
Silver medal – second place	1976 Montreal	middleweight

Vladimir Cheboksarov (born 30 December 1951) is a Russian former wrestler who competed in the 1976 Summer Olympics.
