= Giuseppe Vitucci =

Italian wrestler (1950–2018)

Personal information
- Nationality: Italian
- Born: 4 October 1950 Bari, Italy
- Died: 25 January 2018 (aged 67)

Sport
- Sport: Wrestling

Giuseppe Vitucci also known as Pino Vitucci (4 October 1950 – 25 January 2018) was an Italian wrestler. He competed in the men's Greco-Roman 82 kg at the 1976 Summer Olympics.
