= 2003 Rally of Turkey =

3rd round of the 2003 World Rally Championship

2003 Rally of Turkey 4th Rally of Turkey
Round 3 of the 2003 World Rally Championship season
← Previous event	Next event →
- Host country: Turkey
- Rally base: Kemer
- Dates run: February 27, 2003 – March 2, 2003
- Stages: 18 (337.88 km; 209.95 miles)
- Stage surface: Gravel
- Overall distance: 1,193.85 km (741.82 miles)

Statistics
- Crews: 60 at start, 26 at finish

Overall results
- Overall winner: (Spain) Carlos Sainz (Spain) Marc Martí (France) Citroën Total WRT; Citroën Xsara WRC

The 2003 Rally of Turkey (formally the 4th Rally of Turkey) was the third round of the 2003 World Rally Championship. The race was held over four days between 27 February and 2 March 2003, and was based in Kemer, Turkey. Citroen's Carlos Sainz won the race, his 25th win in the World Rally Championship.

== Background ==
=== Entry list ===
No.	Driver	Co-Driver	Entrant	Car	Tyre
World Rally Championship manufacturer entries
1	(Finland) Marcus Grönholm	(Finland) Timo Rautiainen	(France) Marlboro Peugeot Total	Peugeot 206 WRC	MI
2	(United Kingdom) Richard Burns	(United Kingdom) Robert Reid	(France) Marlboro Peugeot Total	Peugeot 206 WRC	MI
3	(Finland) Harri Rovanperä	(Finland) Risto Pietiläinen	(France) Marlboro Peugeot Total	Peugeot 206 WRC	MI
4	(Estonia) Markko Märtin	(United Kingdom) Michael Park	(United Kingdom) Ford Motor Co. Ltd.	Ford Focus RS WRC '02	MI
5	(Belgium) François Duval	(Belgium) Stéphane Prévot	(United Kingdom) Ford Motor Co. Ltd.	Ford Focus RS WRC '02	MI
6	(Finland) Mikko Hirvonen	(Finland) Jarmo Lehtinen	(United Kingdom) Ford Motor Co. Ltd.	Ford Focus RS WRC '02	MI
7	(Norway) Petter Solberg	(United Kingdom) Phil Mills	(Japan) 555 Subaru World Rally Team	Subaru Impreza S9 WRC '03	P
8	(Finland) Tommi Mäkinen	(Finland) Kaj Lindström	(Japan) 555 Subaru World Rally Team	Subaru Impreza S9 WRC '03	P
10	(Germany) Armin Schwarz	(Germany) Manfred Hiemer	(South Korea) Hyundai World Rally Team	Hyundai Accent WRC3	MI
11	(Belgium) Freddy Loix	(Belgium) Sven Smeets	(South Korea) Hyundai World Rally Team	Hyundai Accent WRC3	MI
14	(France) Didier Auriol	(France) Denis Giraudet	(Czech Republic) Škoda Motorsport	Škoda Octavia WRC Evo3	MI
15	(Finland) Toni Gardemeister	(Finland) Paavo Lukander	(Czech Republic) Škoda Motorsport	Škoda Octavia WRC Evo3	MI
17	(United Kingdom) Colin McRae	(United Kingdom) Derek Ringer	(France) Citroën Total WRT	Citroën Xsara WRC	MI
18	(France) Sébastien Loeb	(Monaco) Daniel Elena	(France) Citroën Total WRT	Citroën Xsara WRC	MI
19	(Spain) Carlos Sainz	(Spain) Marc Martí	(France) Citroën Total WRT	Citroën Xsara WRC	MI
World Rally Championship entries
21	(France) Gilles Panizzi	(France) Hervé Panizzi	(France) Bozian Racing	Peugeot 206 WRC	MI
22	(Finland) Juuso Pykälistö	(Finland) Esko Mertsalmi	(France) Bozian Racing	Peugeot 206 WRC	MI
24	(Hungary) Balázs Benik	(Hungary) Bence Rácz	(Hungary) Balázs Benik	Ford Focus RS WRC '02	—N/a
32	(Turkey) Serkan Yazici	(Turkey) Can Okan	(Turkey) Ford Hazirkart Rally Team	Ford Focus RS WRC '01	—N/a
103	(United Kingdom) Alistair Ginley	(Republic of Ireland) Rory Kennedy	(United Kingdom) Alistair Ginley	Ford Focus RS WRC '01	P
104	(Hungary) Rajmund Fülöp	(Hungary) Gábor Major	(Hungary) Rajmund Fülöp	Toyota Corolla WRC	—N/a
113	(Turkey) Emin Ali Sipahi	(Turkey) Alp Berker	(Turkey) Emin Ali Sipahi	Mitsubishi Lancer Evo VII	P
JWRC entries
51	(San Marino) Mirco Baldacci	(Italy) Giovanni Bernacchini	(Italy) Purity Auto	Fiat Punto S1600	MI
52	(Sweden) Daniel Carlsson	(Sweden) Matthias Andersson	(Japan) Suzuki Sport	Suzuki Ignis S1600	MI
54	(Finland) Kosti Katajamäki	(Finland) Miikka Anttila	(Germany) Volkswagen Racing	Volkswagen Polo S1600	MI
55	(Norway) Martin Stenshorne	(United Kingdom) Clive Jenkins	(United Kingdom) Ford Motor Co. Ltd.	Ford Puma S1600	MI
57	(Bulgaria) Dimitar Iliev	(Bulgaria) Petar Sivov	(Italy) Auto Sport Italia	Peugeot 206 S1600	MI
58	(Argentina) Marcos Ligato	(Argentina) Rubén García	(Italy) Top Run SRL	Fiat Punto S1600	MI
59	(Austria) Beppo Harrach	(Germany) Michael Kölbach	(Italy) Astra Racing	Ford Puma S1600	MI
61	(France) Brice Tirabassi	(France) Jacques-Julien Renucci	(France) Renault Sport	Renault Clio S1600	MI
62	(Sweden) Oscar Svedlund	(Sweden) Björn Nilsson	(Germany) Volkswagen Racing	Volkswagen Polo S1600	MI
63	(Italy) Massimo Ceccato	(Italy) Mitia Dotta	(Italy) Top Run SRL	Fiat Punto S1600	MI
64	(Finland) Ville-Pertti Teuronen	(Finland) Harri Kaapro	(Japan) Suzuki Sport	Suzuki Ignis S1600	MI
65	(Lebanon) Abdo Feghali	(Lebanon) Joseph Matar	(Italy) Astra Racing	Ford Puma S1600	MI
66	(France) Sébastien Ceccone	(France) Julien Giroux	(France) Citroën Total	Citroën Saxo S1600	MI
67	(San Marino) Alessandro Broccoli	(Italy) Simona Girelli	(San Marino) Sab Motorsport	Opel Corsa S1600	MI
68	(Croatia) Juraj Šebalj	(Croatia) Toni Klinc	Renault Croatia	Renault Clio S1600	MI
69	(Spain) Salvador Cañellas Jr.	(Spain) Xavier Amigó	(Japan) Suzuki Sport	Suzuki Ignis S1600	MI
70	(United Kingdom) Guy Wilks	(United Kingdom) Phil Pugh	(United Kingdom) Ford Motor Co. Ltd.	Ford Puma S1600	MI
71	(Estonia) Urmo Aava	(Estonia) Kuldar Sikk	(Japan) Suzuki Sport	Suzuki Ignis S1600	MI
73	(Bulgaria) Krum Donchev	(Bulgaria) Ruman Manolov	(Italy) Auto Sport Italia	Opel Corsa S1600	MI
74	(United Kingdom) Kris Meeke	(United Kingdom) Chris Patterson	(Germany) Opel Motorsport	Opel Corsa S1600	MI
76	(Italy) Luca Cecchettini	(Italy) Nicola Arena	(Italy) Top Run SRL	Fiat Punto S1600	MI
78	(Germany) Vladan Vasiljevic	(Germany) Sebastian Geipel	(Germany) Volkswagen Racing	Volkswagen Polo S1600	MI

=== Itinerary ===
All dates and times are EET (UTC+2).

Date	Time	No.	Stage name	Distance
Leg 1 — 95.35 km
27 February	19:00	SS1	Efes Pilsen SSS	1.55 km
28 February	09:01	SS2	Simena 1	2.73 km
28 February	09:39	SS3	Phaselis 1	16.42 km
28 February	10:27	SS4	Silyon 1	29.87 km
28 February	13:45	SS5	Perge 1	14.91 km
28 February	14:48	SS6	Silyon 2	29.87 km
Leg 2 — 158.59 km
1 March	07:11	SS7	Olympos 1	20.44 km
1 March	07:54	SS8	Kumluca 1	28.92 km
1 March	11:02	SS9	Phaselis 2	15.48 km
1 March	11:55	SS10	Myra 1	24.10 km
1 March	12:58	SS11	Kemer 1	20.29 km
1 March	15:01	SS12	Olympos 2	20.44 km
1 March	15:44	SS13	Kumluca 2	28.92 km
Leg 3 — 84.30 km
2 March	08:01	SS14	Simena 2	2.73 km
2 March	08:49	SS15	Myra 2	24.10 km
2 March	09:32	SS16	Arykanda	12.00 km
2 March	13:00	SS17	Perge 2	24.97 km
2 March	14:13	SS18	Kemer 2	20.50 km

== Results ==
=== Overall ===
Pos.	No.	Driver	Co-driver	Team	Car	Time	Difference	Points
1	19	(Spain) Carlos Sainz	(Spain) Marc Martí	(France) Citroën Total WRT	Citroën Xsara WRC	4:32:14.1		10
2	2	(United Kingdom) Richard Burns	(United Kingdom) Robert Reid	(France) Marlboro Peugeot Total	Peugeot 206 WRC	4:33:02.0	+47.9	8
3	5	(Belgium) François Duval	(Belgium) Stéphane Prévot	(United Kingdom) Ford Motor Co. Ltd.	Ford Focus RS WRC '02	4:34:00.6	+1:46.5	6
4	17	(United Kingdom) Colin McRae	(United Kingdom) Derek Ringer	(France) Citroën Total WRT	Citroën Xsara WRC	4:34:23.2	+2:09.1	5
5	21	(France) Gilles Panizzi	(France) Hervé Panizzi	(France) Bozian Racing	Peugeot 206 WRC	4:34:55.7	+2:41.6	4
6	4	(Estonia) Markko Märtin	(United Kingdom) Michael Park	(United Kingdom) Ford Motor Co. Ltd.	Ford Focus RS WRC '02	4:35:39.0	+3:24.9	3
7	15	(Finland) Toni Gardemeister	(Finland) Paavo Lukander	(Czech Republic) Škoda Motorsport	Škoda Octavia WRC Evo3	4:37:27.1	+5:13.0	2
8	8	(Finland) Tommi Mäkinen	(Finland) Kaj Lindström	(Japan) 555 Subaru World Rally Team	Subaru Impreza S9 WRC '03	4:39:32.7	+7:18.6	1

=== World Rally Cars ===
==== Classification ====
Position		No.	Driver	Co-driver	Entrant	Car	Time	Difference	Points
Event	Class	No.	Driver	Co-driver	Entrant	Car	Time	Difference	Points
1	1	19	(Spain) Carlos Sainz	(Spain) Marc Martí	(France) Citroën Total WRT	Citroën Xsara WRC	4:32:14.1		10
2	2	2	(United Kingdom) Richard Burns	(United Kingdom) Robert Reid	(France) Marlboro Peugeot Total	Peugeot 206 WRC	4:33:02.0	+47.9	8
3	3	5	(Belgium) François Duval	(Belgium) Stéphane Prévot	(United Kingdom) Ford Motor Co. Ltd.	Ford Focus RS WRC '02	4:34:00.6	+1:46.5	6
4	4	17	(United Kingdom) Colin McRae	(United Kingdom) Derek Ringer	(France) Citroën Total WRT	Citroën Xsara WRC	4:34:23.2	+2:09.1	5
6	5	4	(Estonia) Markko Märtin	(United Kingdom) Michael Park	(United Kingdom) Ford Motor Co. Ltd.	Ford Focus RS WRC '02	4:35:39.0	+3:24.9	3
7	6	15	(Finland) Toni Gardemeister	(Finland) Paavo Lukander	(Czech Republic) Škoda Motorsport	Škoda Octavia WRC Evo3	4:37:27.1	+5:13.0	2
8	7	8	(Finland) Tommi Mäkinen	(Finland) Kaj Lindström	(Japan) 555 Subaru World Rally Team	Subaru Impreza S9 WRC '03	4:39:32.7	+7:18.6	1
9	8	1	(Finland) Marcus Grönholm	(Finland) Timo Rautiainen	(France) Marlboro Peugeot Total	Peugeot 206 WRC	4:43:06.3	+10:52.2	0
10	9	11	(Belgium) Freddy Loix	(Belgium) Sven Smeets	(South Korea) Hyundai World Rally Team	Hyundai Accent WRC3	4:43:54.5	+11:40.4	0
Retired SS13		3	(Finland) Harri Rovanperä	(Finland) Risto Pietiläinen	(France) Marlboro Peugeot Total	Peugeot 206 WRC	Rear axle-shaft		0
Retired SS7		10	(Germany) Armin Schwarz	(Germany) Manfred Hiemer	(South Korea) Hyundai World Rally Team	Hyundai Accent WRC3	Suspension		0
Retired SS7		14	(France) Didier Auriol	(France) Denis Giraudet	(Czech Republic) Škoda Motorsport	Škoda Octavia WRC Evo3	Engine		0
Retired SS4		6	(Finland) Mikko Hirvonen	(Finland) Jarmo Lehtinen	(United Kingdom) Ford Motor Co. Ltd.	Ford Focus RS WRC '02	Suspension		0
Retired SS4		7	(Norway) Petter Solberg	(United Kingdom) Phil Mills	(Japan) 555 Subaru World Rally Team	Subaru Impreza S9 WRC '03	Steering		0
Retired SS4		18	(France) Sébastien Loeb	(Monaco) Daniel Elena	(France) Citroën Total WRT	Citroën Xsara WRC	No fuel		0

==== Special stages ====
Day	Stage	Stage name	Length	Winner	Car	Time	Class leaders
Leg 1 (27 Feb)	SS1	Efes Pilsen SSS	1.55 km	(Finland) Marcus Grönholm	Peugeot 206 WRC	1:12.1	(Finland) Marcus Grönholm
Leg 1 (28 Feb)	SS2	Simena 1	2.73 km	(Finland) Harri Rovanperä (Norway) Petter Solberg	Peugeot 206 WRC; Subaru Impreza S9 WRC '03	1:52.7	(Norway) Petter Solberg
Leg 1 (28 Feb)	SS3	Phaselis 1	16.42 km	(Norway) Petter Solberg	Subaru Impreza S9 WRC '03	12:28.6	(Norway) Petter Solberg
Leg 1 (28 Feb)	SS4	Silyon 1	29.87 km	(Finland) Harri Rovanperä	Peugeot 206 WRC	23:51.8	(Finland) Harri Rovanperä
Leg 1 (28 Feb)	SS5	Perge 1	14.91 km	(Estonia) Markko Märtin	Ford Focus RS WRC '02	11:50.5	(Finland) Harri Rovanperä
Leg 1 (28 Feb)	SS6	Silyon 2	29.87 km	(Finland) Harri Rovanperä	Peugeot 206 WRC	23:19.1	(Finland) Harri Rovanperä
Leg 2 (1 Mar)	SS7	Olympos 1	20.44 km	(Finland) Harri Rovanperä	Peugeot 206 WRC	16:45.1	(Finland) Harri Rovanperä
Leg 2 (1 Mar)	SS8	Kumluca 1	28.92 km	(Spain) Carlos Sainz	Citroën Xsara WRC	24:47.0	(Finland) Harri Rovanperä
Leg 2 (1 Mar)	SS9	Phaselis 2	15.48 km	(Finland) Marcus Grönholm	Peugeot 206 WRC	11:51.4	(Finland) Harri Rovanperä
Leg 2 (1 Mar)	SS10	Myra 1	24.10 km	(Spain) Carlos Sainz	Citroën Xsara WRC	21:45.4	(Spain) Carlos Sainz
Leg 2 (1 Mar)	SS11	Kemer 1	20.29 km	(United Kingdom) Richard Burns	Peugeot 206 WRC	15:06.8	(Spain) Carlos Sainz
Leg 2 (1 Mar)	SS12	Olympos 2	20.44 km	(Estonia) Markko Märtin	Ford Focus RS WRC '02	16:29.6	(Spain) Carlos Sainz
Leg 2 (1 Mar)	SS13	Kumluca 2	28.92 km	(Spain) Carlos Sainz	Citroën Xsara WRC	24:27.1	(Spain) Carlos Sainz
Leg 3 (2 Mar)	SS14	Simena 2	2.73 km	(United Kingdom) Colin McRae	Citroën Xsara WRC	1:51.3	(Spain) Carlos Sainz
Leg 3 (2 Mar)	SS15	Myra 2	24.10 km	(United Kingdom) Richard Burns	Peugeot 206 WRC	21:20.7	(Spain) Carlos Sainz
Leg 3 (2 Mar)	SS16	Arykanda	12.00 km	(Belgium) François Duval	Ford Focus RS WRC '02	8:13.4	(Spain) Carlos Sainz
Leg 3 (2 Mar)	SS17	Perge 2	24.97 km	(Finland) Marcus Grönholm	Peugeot 206 WRC	18:13.8	(Spain) Carlos Sainz
Leg 3 (2 Mar)	SS18	Kemer 2	20.50 km	(Finland) Marcus Grönholm	Peugeot 206 WRC	14:46.5	(Spain) Carlos Sainz

==== Championship standings ====
Pos.	Drivers' championships			Co-drivers' championships			Manufacturers' championships		
Pos.	Move	Driver	Points	Move	Co-driver	Points	Move	Manufacturer	Points
1	3	(United Kingdom) Richard Burns	18	3	(United Kingdom) Robert Reid	18		(France) Citroën Total WRT	39
2		(United Kingdom) Colin McRae	17		(United Kingdom) Derek Ringer	17		(France) Marlboro Peugeot Total	31
3	4	(Spain) Carlos Sainz	16	4	(Spain) Marc Martí	16		(United Kingdom) Ford Motor Co. Ltd.	25
4	1	(Estonia) Markko Märtin	13	1	(United Kingdom) Michael Park	13		(Japan) 555 Subaru World Rally Team	13
5	4	(France) Sébastien Loeb	12	4	(Monaco) Daniel Elena	12	1	(Czech Republic) Škoda Motorsport	6

=== Junior World Rally Championship ===
==== Classification ====
Position		No.	Driver	Co-driver	Entrant	Car	Time	Difference	Points
Event	Class	No.	Driver	Co-driver	Entrant	Car	Time	Difference	Points
17	1	54	(Finland) Kosti Katajamäki	(Finland) Miikka Anttila	(Germany) Volkswagen Racing	Volkswagen Polo S1600	5:08:56.6		10
18	2	69	(Spain) Salvador Cañellas Jr.	(Spain) Xavier Amigó	(Japan) Suzuki Sport	Suzuki Ignis S1600	5:14:01.4	+5:04.8	8
19	3	70	(United Kingdom) Guy Wilks	(United Kingdom) Phil Pugh	(United Kingdom) Ford Motor Co. Ltd.	Ford Puma S1600	5:18:05.1	+9:08.5	6
20	4	64	(Finland) Ville-Pertti Teuronen	(Finland) Harri Kaapro	(Japan) Suzuki Sport	Suzuki Ignis S1600	5:22:19.2	+13:22.6	5
21	5	76	(Italy) Luca Cecchettini	(Italy) Nicola Arena	(Italy) Top Run SRL	Fiat Punto S1600	5:38:05.6	+29:09.0	4
22	6	65	(Lebanon) Abdo Feghali	(Lebanon) Joseph Matar	(Italy) Astra Racing	Ford Puma S1600	5:50:18.0	+41:21.4	3
23	7	57	(Bulgaria) Dimitar Iliev	(Bulgaria) Petar Sivov	(Italy) Auto Sport Italia	Peugeot 206 S1600	6:06:39.4	+57:42.8	2
Retired SS15		52	(Sweden) Daniel Carlsson	(Sweden) Matthias Andersson	(Japan) Suzuki Sport	Suzuki Ignis S1600	Suspension		0
Retired SS12		58	(Argentina) Marcos Ligato	(Argentina) Rubén García	(Italy) Top Run SRL	Fiat Punto S1600	Gearbox		0
Retired SS12		63	(Italy) Massimo Ceccato	(Italy) Mitia Dotta	(Italy) Top Run SRL	Fiat Punto S1600	Transmission		0
Retired SS12		67	(San Marino) Alessandro Broccoli	(Italy) Simona Girelli	(San Marino) Sab Motorsport	Opel Corsa S1600	Suspension		0
Retired SS9		66	(France) Sébastien Ceccone	(France) Julien Giroux	(France) Citroën Total	Citroën Saxo S1600	Gearbox		0
Retired SS8		68	(Croatia) Juraj Šebalj	(Croatia) Toni Klinc	Renault Croatia	Renault Clio S1600	Suspension		0
Retired SS7		55	(Norway) Martin Stenshorne	(United Kingdom) Clive Jenkins	(United Kingdom) Ford Motor Co. Ltd.	Ford Puma S1600	Codriver ill		0
Retired SS6		74	(United Kingdom) Kris Meeke	(United Kingdom) Chris Patterson	(Germany) Opel Motorsport	Opel Corsa S1600	Lost wheel		0
Retired SS5		71	(Estonia) Urmo Aava	(Estonia) Kuldar Sikk	(Japan) Suzuki Sport	Suzuki Ignis S1600	Suspension		0
Retired SS4		51	(San Marino) Mirco Baldacci	(Italy) Giovanni Bernacchini	(Italy) Purity Auto	Fiat Punto S1600	Suspension		0
Retired SS4		59	(Austria) Beppo Harrach	(Germany) Michael Kölbach	(Italy) Astra Racing	Ford Puma S1600	Oil leak		0
Retired SS3		61	(France) Brice Tirabassi	(France) Jacques-Julien Renucci	(France) Renault Sport	Renault Clio S1600	Accident		0
Retired SS3		62	(Sweden) Oscar Svedlund	(Sweden) Björn Nilsson	(Germany) Volkswagen Racing	Volkswagen Polo S1600	Steering		0
Retired SS3		73	(Bulgaria) Krum Donchev	(Bulgaria) Ruman Manolov	(Italy) Auto Sport Italia	Opel Corsa S1600	Suspension		0
Retired SS1		78	(Germany) Vladan Vasiljevic	(Germany) Sebastian Geipel	(Germany) Volkswagen Racing	Volkswagen Polo S1600	Engine		0

==== Special stages ====
Day	Stage	Stage name	Length	Winner	Car	Time	Class leaders
Leg 1 (27 Feb)	SS1	Efes Pilsen SSS	1.55 km	(France) Brice Tirabassi	Renault Clio S1600	1:22.8	(France) Brice Tirabassi
Leg 1 (28 Feb)	SS2	Simena 1	2.73 km	(Sweden) Daniel Carlsson	Suzuki Ignis S1600	2:07.3	(Sweden) Daniel Carlsson
Leg 1 (28 Feb)	SS3	Phaselis 1	16.42 km	(Sweden) Daniel Carlsson	Suzuki Ignis S1600	14:07.1	(Sweden) Daniel Carlsson
Leg 1 (28 Feb)	SS4	Silyon 1	29.87 km	(Sweden) Daniel Carlsson	Suzuki Ignis S1600	26:23.8	(Sweden) Daniel Carlsson
Leg 1 (28 Feb)	SS5	Perge 1	14.91 km	(Sweden) Daniel Carlsson	Suzuki Ignis S1600	12:44.0	(Sweden) Daniel Carlsson
Leg 1 (28 Feb)	SS6	Silyon 2	29.87 km	(Argentina) Marcos Ligato	Fiat Punto S1600	26:25.3	(Sweden) Daniel Carlsson
Leg 2 (1 Mar)	SS7	Olympos 1	20.44 km	(Argentina) Marcos Ligato	Fiat Punto S1600	19:09.4	(Sweden) Daniel Carlsson
Leg 2 (1 Mar)	SS8	Kumluca 1	28.92 km	(Finland) Ville-Pertti Teuronen	Suzuki Ignis S1600	27:35.9	(Sweden) Daniel Carlsson
Leg 2 (1 Mar)	SS9	Phaselis 2	15.48 km	(Sweden) Daniel Carlsson	Suzuki Ignis S1600	13:29.4	(Sweden) Daniel Carlsson
Leg 2 (1 Mar)	SS10	Myra 1	24.10 km	(Sweden) Daniel Carlsson	Suzuki Ignis S1600	24:16.0	(Sweden) Daniel Carlsson
Leg 2 (1 Mar)	SS11	Kemer 1	20.29 km	(Sweden) Daniel Carlsson	Suzuki Ignis S1600	16:41.2	(Sweden) Daniel Carlsson
Leg 2 (1 Mar)	SS12	Olympos 2	20.44 km	(Finland) Ville-Pertti Teuronen	Suzuki Ignis S1600	18:34.9	(Sweden) Daniel Carlsson
Leg 2 (1 Mar)	SS13	Kumluca 2	28.92 km	(Finland) Ville-Pertti Teuronen	Suzuki Ignis S1600	27:39.7	(Finland) Kosti Katajamäki
Leg 3 (2 Mar)	SS14	Simena 2	2.73 km	(Sweden) Daniel Carlsson	Suzuki Ignis S1600	2:05.9	(Finland) Kosti Katajamäki
Leg 3 (2 Mar)	SS15	Myra 2	24.10 km	(Finland) Kosti Katajamäki	Volkswagen Polo S1600	23:50.5	(Finland) Kosti Katajamäki
Leg 3 (2 Mar)	SS16	Arykanda	12.00 km	(United Kingdom) Guy Wilks	Ford Puma S1600	9:19.3	(Finland) Kosti Katajamäki
Leg 3 (2 Mar)	SS17	Perge 2	24.97 km	(Finland) Kosti Katajamäki	Volkswagen Polo S1600	20:55.0	(Finland) Kosti Katajamäki
Leg 3 (2 Mar)	SS18	Kemer 2	20.50 km	(Finland) Kosti Katajamäki	Volkswagen Polo S1600	17:24.2	(Finland) Kosti Katajamäki

==== Championship standings ====
Pos.	Drivers' championships		
Pos.	Move	Driver	Points
1		(France) Brice Tirabassi	10
2	New entry	(Finland) Kosti Katajamäki	10
3	1	(Argentina) Marcos Ligato	8
4	New entry	(Spain) Salvador Cañellas Jr.	8
5	2	(San Marino) Alessandro Broccoli	6
