= Dasrangiin Myagmar =

Mongolian wrestler

Personal information
- Nationality: Mongolian
- Born: 1949 (age 76–77) Buyant, Mongolia

Sport
- Sport: Wrestling

Dasrangiin Myagmar (born 1949) is a Mongolian wrestler. He competed in the men's Greco-Roman 82 kg at the 1972 Summer Olympics.
