= Kazuhiro Takanishi =

Japanese wrestler

Personal information
- Nationality: Japanese
- Born: 11 June 1953 (age 73)

Sport
- Sport: Wrestling

Kazuhiro Takanishi (高西 一宏, Takanishi Kazuhiro; born 11 June 1953) is a Japanese wrestler. He competed in the men's Greco-Roman 82 kg at the 1976 Summer Olympics.
