= Ivan Kolev (wrestler) =

Bulgarian wrestler (born 1951)

Medal record

Men's Greco-Roman wrestling

Representing Bulgaria

Olympic Games
Bronze medal – third place	1976 Montreal	middleweight

Ivan Kolev (Bulgarian: Иван Колев) (born 17 April 1951) is a Bulgarian former wrestler who competed in the 1972 Summer Olympics and in the 1976 Summer Olympics. He was also active in the world championships. In the 1973 World Championship he finished: 74.0 kg. Greco-Roman (1st). In the 1973 European Championship he finished: 74.0 kg. Greco-Roman (1st). In the 1974 European Championship he finished: 74.0 kg. Greco-Roman (1st); 1975 European Championship: 74.0 kg. Greco-Roman (6th).
