= Milan Nenadić =

Serbian wrestler (1943–2024)

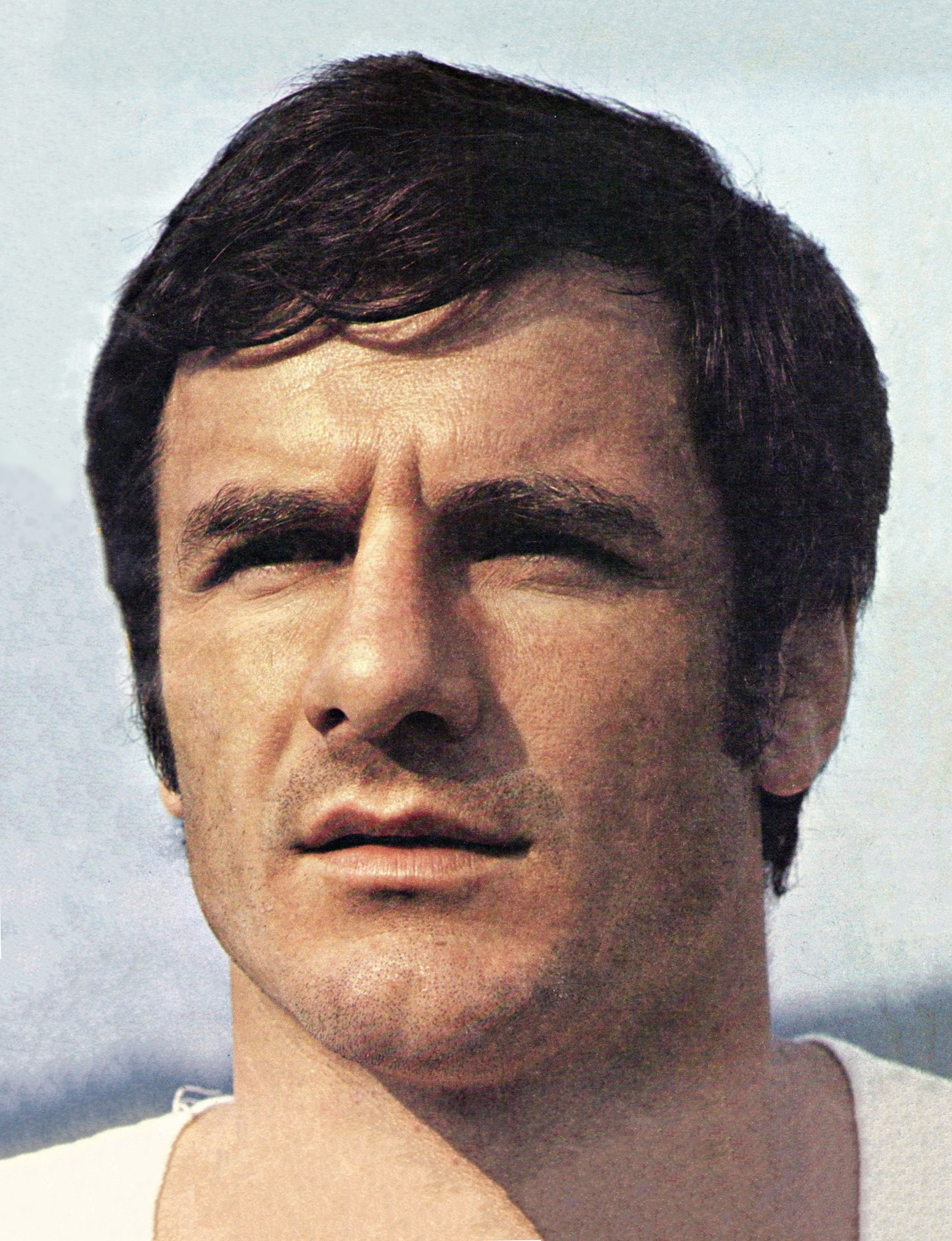
- Nenadić in 1972

Personal information
- Born: 12 August 1943 Petrinja, Independent State of Croatia
- Died: 16 January 2024 (aged 80) Zrenjanin, Serbia
- Height: 176 cm (5 ft 9 in)

Sport
- Sport: Greco-Roman wrestling
- Club: Radnik, Petrinja
Medal record
Representing Yugoslavia
Olympic Games
Bronze medal – third place	1972 Munich	-82 kg
World Championships
Bronze medal – third place	1969 Mar del Plata	-82 kg
Bronze medal – third place	1970 Edmonton	-82 kg
Silver medal – second place	1973 Tehran	-82 kg
European Championships
Silver medal – second place	1968 Västerås	-78 kg
Gold medal – first place	1969 Modena	-82 kg
Gold medal – first place	1970 Berlin	-82 kg
Mediterranean Games
Silver medal – second place	1971 Izmir	82kg

Milan Nenadić (12 August 1943 – 16 January 2024) was a Serbian middleweight Greco-Roman wrestler. Representing Yugoslavia, Nenadić competed in the 1968 and 1972 Summer Olympics and won a bronze medal in 1972. He was a European champion in 1969 and 1970 and won three medals at the world championships in 1969–1973.

Being of Croatian Serb descent, he was a recipient of the silver plaque of the Serbian Wrestling Association.

Milan Nenadić died on 16 January 2024, at the age of 80.
