= Ali Yağmur =

Turkish wrestler (born 1943)

Ali Yağmur (born 1 January 1943) is a Turkish former wrestler who competed in the 1972 Summer Olympics.
