= Juraj Šebalj =

Croatian rally driver (born 1976)

Personal information
- Nationality: (Croatia) Croatian
- Born: February 26, 1976 (age 50)

World Rally Championship record
- Years active: 2003, 2006
- Co-driver: (Croatia) Toni Klinc
- Teams: Privateer
- Rallies: 3
- Championships: 0
- Rally wins: 0
- Podiums: 0
- Stage wins: 0
- Total points: 0
- First rally: 2003 Monte Carlo Rally
- Last rally: 2006 Monte Carlo Rally

Juraj Šebalj (born 26 February 1976) is a Croatian rally driver.

== Career ==
Šebalj won the Croatian Rally Championship for six years running, driving a Group N Mitsubishi Lancer Evolution IX, and was twice Production Car champion in the Central European Zone Rally Championship.

A 21-year-old Šebalj made his debut in 1997, driving a Rover Mini Cooper. Then in 2003, the Croatian did two rounds of that year's Junior World Rally Championship. In his home country, he has succeeded in winning the Croatia Rally three times in the mid-2000s. Šebalj would also win the Delta Rally twice more post-split.

In the 2015 Croatia Rally, Šebalj was fifth overall, having been beaten by four leading drivers, the winner Murat Bostancı, runner up Hermann Gassner, Jr., third placer Darko Peljhan and fourth placer János Puskádi. Šebalj had encountered problems with his Evo's gearbox when it got stuck in third gear and could not get any higher than third, with Turkish driver Bostancı leading from start to finish en route to becoming the European Rally Trophy champion in 2015.

The 43rd edition of the Croatia Rally was won by Šebalj and Maja Sabol in Mitsubishi Lancer Evo IX.
