= Csaba Hegedűs (wrestler) =

Hungarian wrestler (born 1948)

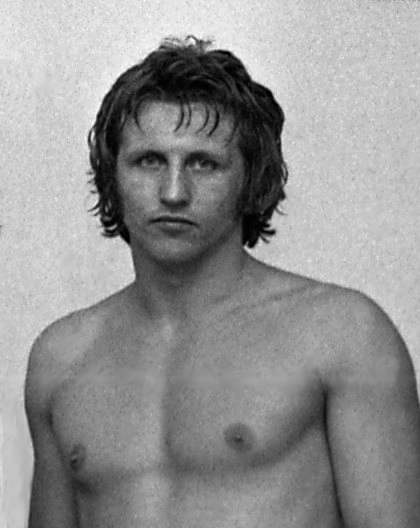
- Hegedűs in 1974

Personal information
- Born: 6 September 1948 (age 77) Sárvár, Hungary
- Height: 187 cm (6 ft 2 in)

Sport
- Sport: Greco-Roman wrestling
- Club: Vasas, Budapest
Medal record
Men's Greco-Roman wrestling
Representing Hungary
Olympic Games
Gold medal – first place	1972 Munich	82 kg
World Championships
Gold medal – first place	1971 Sofia	82 kg
European Championships
Gold medal – first place	1976 Leningrad	82 kg
Gold medal – first place	1977 Bursa	90 kg

Csaba Hegedűs (born 6 September 1948) is a retired middleweight Greco-Roman wrestler from Hungary. In 1971, he won a world title and was named the Hungarian Sportsman of the year. He competed at the 1972 and 1976 Olympics and won a gold medal in 1972. In 1973, he barely survived a traffic accident. He recovered by 1975, when he placed fourth at the world championships, and won European titles in 1976 and 1977. Between 1979 and 1989 he coached the Hungarian wrestling team and later became a sports administrator, working at the national wrestling association, the Hungarian Olympic Committee, and the Fédération Internationale des Luttes Associées (FILA).

He served as President of the Hungarian Wrestling Association from 1992 to 2015. He was replaced by Szilárd Németh.

Awards
Preceded by Péter Kelemen	Hungarian Sportsman of The Year; 1971	Succeeded by András Balczó
Sporting positions
Preceded by ?	President of the Hungarian Wrestling Federation; 1992–2015	Succeeded by Szilárd Németh
