= Leif Andersson (wrestler) =

Swedish wrestler

Personal information
- Nationality: Swedish
- Born: 13 October 1949 (age 75); Arboga, Sweden

Sport
- Sport: Wrestling

Leif Andersson (born 13 October 1949) is a Swedish wrestler. He competed at the 1976 Summer Olympics and the 1980 Summer Olympics.
