= Ion Enache =

Romanian wrestler (born 1947)

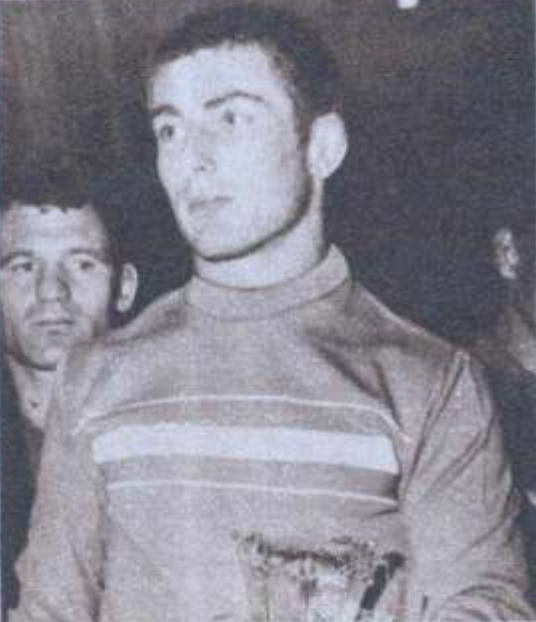
- Born: February 21, 1947 Ploiești
- Died: 23.10.2025 Bucharest
- Height: 5 ft 9 in (1.75 m)
- Weight: 176 lb (80 kg)

Rugby union career
- Position: Centre
International career
Years	Team	Apps	(Points)
1977	Romania	1	(0)
- Correct as of January 25, 2019

Ion Enache (21 February 1947 - 23 October 2025) was a Romanian former wrestler who competed in the 1968 Summer Olympics and in the 1976 Summer Olympics. Enache was also a former rugby union player who played at centre and made one appearance for the Romania national rugby union team in 1977 in a 1977–78 FIRA Trophy match against Italy—a 10–10 draw.
