= Ion Gabor =

Romanian wrestler

- Born: October 19, 1943; Romania
- Occupation: wrestler

Ion Gabor (born 19 October 1943) is a Romanian former wrestler who competed in the 1972 Summer Olympics.
