= Jan Kårström =

Swedish wrestler

Jan Kårström (born 6 December 1944) is a Swedish former wrestler who competed in the 1968 Summer Olympics and in the 1972 Summer Olympics.
