= Houshang Montazeralzohour =

Iranian wrestler

Houshang Montazeralzohour (Persian: هوشنگ منتظرالظهور, 22 May 1951 – 3 October 1981) was an Iranian Greco-Roman wrestler who competed in the 1976 Summer Olympics.

== Life ==
Houshang Montazeralzohour was the national champion of Iran in 82kg weight class for several years. After the Iranian revolution, he became a wrestling coach at the University of Isfahan. In 1981, he was arrested and tortured for two months before being executed. He was charged with insurrection, although few details were made public.
