= Frank Hartmann (wrestler) =

German wrestler (born 1949)

Frank Hartmann (30 August 1949 – 9 November 2024) was a German wrestler who competed in the 1972 Summer Olympics.
