= Keijo Manni =

Finnish wrestler

Personal information
- Nationality: Finnish
- Born: 3 April 1951 (age 75) Peräseinäjoki, Finland

Sport
- Sport: Wrestling

Keijo Manni (born 3 April 1951) is a Finnish wrestler. He competed at the 1976 Summer Olympics and the 1980 Summer Olympics.
