= Toyota GR Celica Rally1 =

- Category: Rally1 (WRC27)
- Constructor: Toyota
- Designer: Tom Fowler
- Predecessor: Toyota GR Yaris Rally1

Technical specifications
- Tyres: Hankook

Competition history
- Notable entrants: (Japan) Toyota Racing
- Notable drivers: (United Kingdom) Elfyn Evans; (Finland) Sami Pajari; (Sweden) Oliver Solberg
- Debut: (Monaco) 2027 Monte Carlo Rally
Races	Wins	Podiums	Titles
0	0	0	0
- Constructors' Championships: 0
- Drivers' Championships: 0

The Toyota GR Celica Rally1 is a Rally1 car built by Toyota Racing to compete in the World Rally Championship. The car is based on the Toyota Celica road car and will mark the first time that Toyota have entered a Celica in the championship since the GT-Four (ST205) model competed in 1995. (Note: Toyota Racing entered several Celica GT-Four cars in the 1996 and 1997 seasons, but these entires were not eligible to score manufacturers' points as Toyota were banned from competing after they were caught cheating in 1995.)

The car is due to make its competitive debut at the 2027 Monte Carlo Rally. It will be driven by defending World Champions Elfyn Evans and Scott Martin, Oliver Solberg and Elliott Edmondson, and Sami Pajari and Marko Salminen.

== Design and development ==
The GR Celica Rally1 was developed by Toyota Racing throughout 2026 in anticipation of the 2027 regulations. It was designed alongside the 2027-specification Toyota GR Yaris Rally1, which will be entered under by Toyota under the Gazoo Racing name. The two cars share the same chassis and internal workings, with the only significant different between the two being the bodywork. These were designed to produce the same drag coefficient and ensure that neither car had the advantage over the other.
