= Rally US =

US rally competition

- Status: Upcoming
- Genre: motorsporting event
- Frequency: annual
- Location: Knoxville, Tennessee
- Country: United States
- Inaugurated: 2027

Rally US is an upcoming rally competition based in Knoxville, Tennessee. It is scheduled to be first held in 2027 as a part of the 2027 World Rally Championship.
