= André Bouchoule =

French wrestler

André Bouchoule (born 23 May 1948) is a French former wrestler who competed in the 1972 Summer Olympics and in the 1976 Summer Olympics.
