= Reinhold Hucker =

German wrestler (born 1949)

Reinhold Hucker (born 15 November 1949) is a German former wrestler who competed in the 1972 Summer Olympics. He was born in Unterelchingen.
