= Adam Ostrowski (wrestler) =

Polish wrestler (1945–2022)

Adam Ostrowski (born 10 July 1945 in Brzeźce – 29 November 2022) was a Polish wrestler who competed in the 1968, 1972, and 1976 Summer Olympics.

A 1968 champion of Poland in welterweight, he also won a bronze medal at the 1975 World Wrestling Championships and a silver medal at the 1970 European Wrestling Championships, both in middleweight.

He died on 29 November 2022, at the age of 77.
