= Kiril Dimitrov (wrestler) =

Bulgarian wrestler

Kiril Dimitrov (Bulgarian: Кирил Димитров) (8 December 1951 – July 2015) was a Bulgarian wrestler who competed in the 1972 Summer Olympics.
