= Croatia Rally =

Rallying event in Croatia

- Status: active
- Genre: Motorsporting event
- Frequency: Annual
- Country: Croatia
- Inaugurated: 1974

The Croatia Rally is an international rallying event based in the cities of Zagreb and Rijeka, Croatia. Held since 1974, Croatia Rally is the longest running motorsport event in Southeast Europe. It joined the World Rally Championship calendar in its 2021 championship. The event is organised by Automobile Clubs D.T. Motorsport and Cro Dakar Team with the support of Croatian Car and Karting Federation and was a round of the European Rally Championship from 2007 until 2013. The event was known in the past as Delta Rally and Croatia Delta Rally. Initially a tarmac and gravel mixed course, it has been a fully tarmac rally since at least the late 1980s.

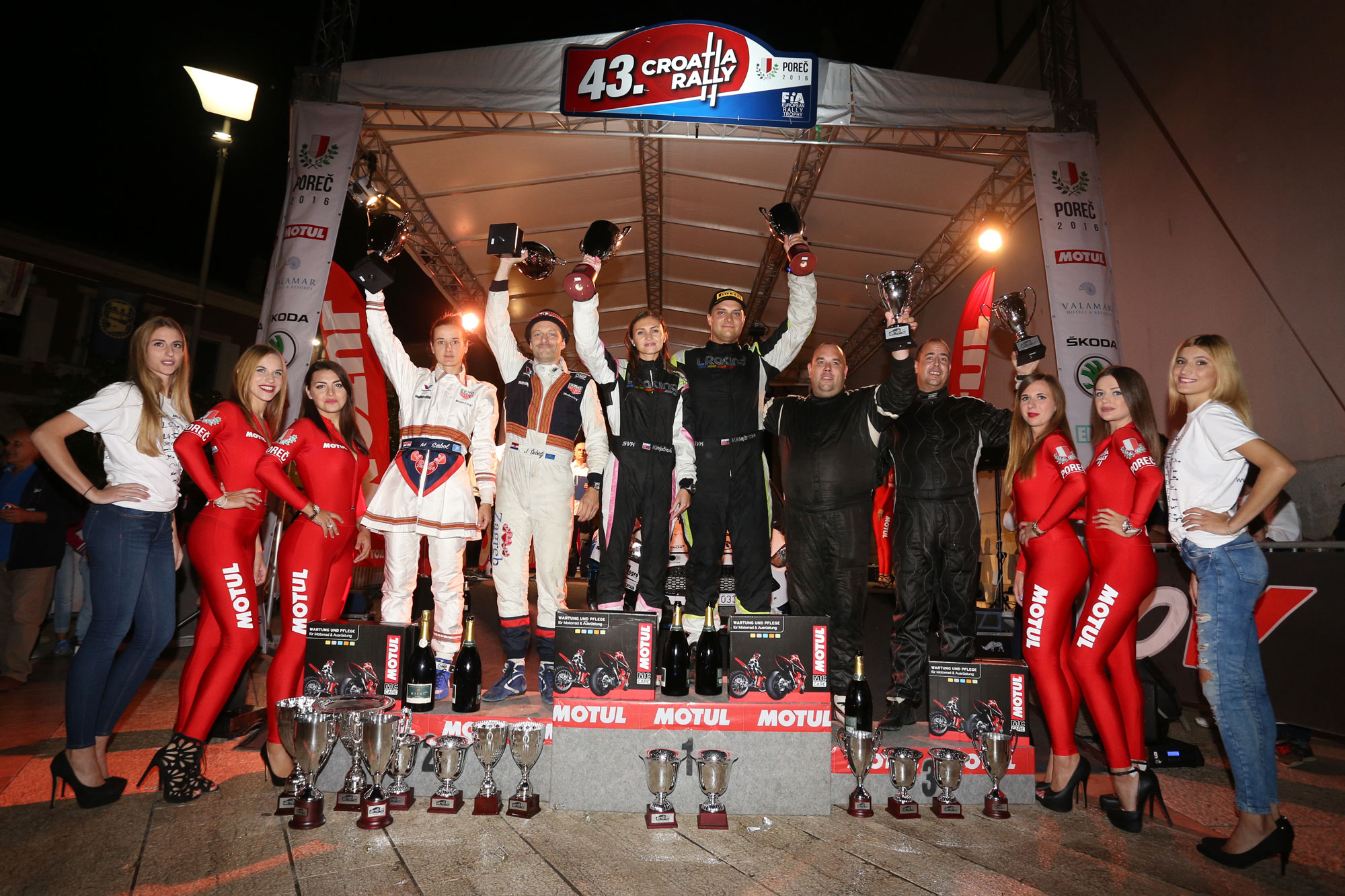
Croatia Rally 2016 Finish Podium, crew members: Maja Sabol (CRO), Juraj Šebalj (CRO), Michaela Vejačkova (SVK), Vlastimil Majerčak (SVK), Gergo Istovics (HUN), Antal Kovacs (HUN)

== History ==
The very first Croatia Rally was held in 1974, under the name INA Delta TLX Rally. It took only three years to grow from a regional race into a national championship event of former Yugoslavia. From the very beginning, the main characteristic of the rally was the extremely long itineraries, which passed through Gorski Kotar, Lika, Primorje and Continental Croatia until the mid-1980s.

The first international recognition that the race experienced was in 1986, when it entered the FIA calendar. That same year, special stages located at Žumberak, Plešivica, Zagrebačka gora and Hrvatsko Zagorje were driven by the crews from Austria, Germany, Czechoslovakia. It was the beginning of the project with the goal of entering the European Championship. Again, in 1986, first nomination towards the FIA was sent. But, the race had to wait for the European pedigree for six years.

Despite the ongoing Croatian War of Independence, Delta Rally had become recognized internationally and was growing rapidly. Good organization has brought it a coefficient 10 by the year 1995, and a year later the organizer nominated it under the name Croatia Rally for the highest coefficient of the contemporary European Championship – 20. It took even eleven years until the prestigious series in Croatia.

In late 2006 FIA has reported that the European Championship (ERC) will spread. 34. Croatia Rally 2007. has entered the calendar as a third out of ten ERC events. The first ERC Croatia Rally was won by the domestic crew Juraj Šebalj and Toni Klinc in Mitsubishi Lancer Evo IX. The remaining two rallies held in Zagreb and its surroundings were won by foreign competitors – Italians Corrado Fontana and Renzo Casazza, along with Bulgarians Krum Donchev and Peter Yordanov.

After three successfully organized ERC events in Zagreb, the economic recession has caused the relocation of the race to Rijeka. In 2010, Croatia Rally was organized by the Automotive Association of Primorje-Gorski Kotar County, and in the next two years by local AC MRC. Special stages were held in Gorski Kotar, Učka, Ćićarija, Istria, and particularly attractive was Super special stage at Opatija Circuit.

In 2013, Croatia Rally moved again. This time to Istria and the town of Poreč, which is the host and co-organizer of the event. The rally was organized by the Croatian Car and Karting Federation and the special stages were driven at Učka, Ćićarija and in the triangle of the cities of Buzet, Motovun and Pazin.

The most wins in the history of Croatia Rally were achieved by Slovenians, driver Branislav Kuzmič and co-driver Rudi Šali, each with five victories. They are followed by the Croatian crew Juraj Šebalj - Toni Klinc with four victories and Croatian driver Tihomir Filipović and his co-driver Davor Devunić, with three victories each.

== WRC ==
"With a huge international promotion, just imagine the economic effect for Croatia achieved by tens of thousands of overnight stays, local expenditures of participants and thousands of people engaged for the organisation. We hope that the situation at the end of April will allow spectators to be there. This would mean the arrival of many WRC fans from around the world. This is the best possible invitation before this year’s tourist season."

— Davorin Štetner, president of the Croatian Automobile & Karting Federation and WRC Croatia Rally Steering Committee.

On October 10, 2020, FIA World Motorsport Council has confirmed Croatia Rally as a new round of the World Rally Championship. The country is set to become the thirty-fourth nation to stage a championship round in the WRC. FIA President Jean Todt congratulated Croatian Automobile & Karting Federation president Davorin Štetner and pointed out that successful including in the 2021 calendar was possible thanks to support of Mayor of Zagreb and Croatian Government. The dates for Croatia Rally 2021 were from April 22 until April 25. Rally Headquarters, start and finish podium will be in Zagreb and itinerary will pass through Karlovac County, Zagreb County and Krapina-Zagorje County. The surface of Special Stages is tarmac.

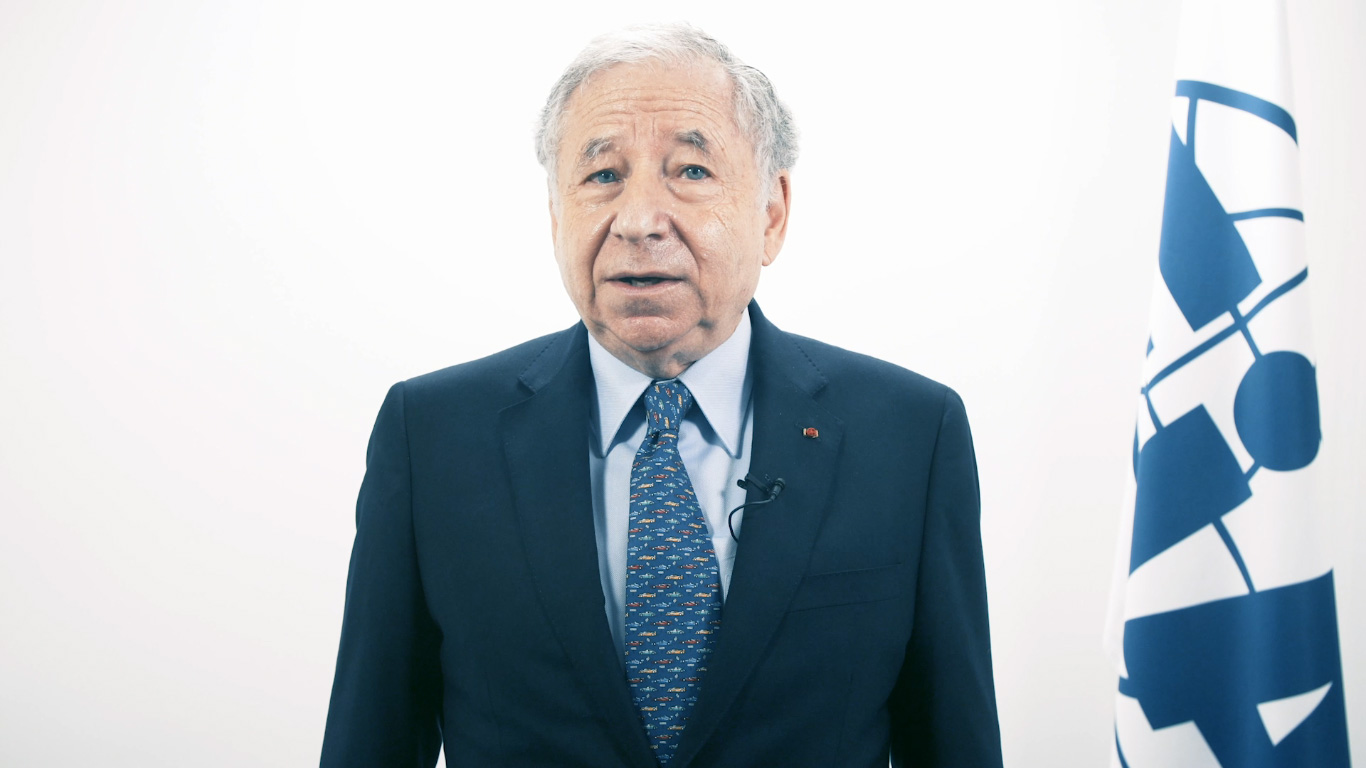
Jean Todt congratulates Croatia Rally organisers via video message

The idea of bringing WRC to Croatia was born by Daniel Šaškin in 2013 while Croatia Rally was part of the European Rally Championship. Lobbying for the WRC in Croatia began in 2015 thanks to Zrinko Gregurek, Secretary General of CCKF at the time, as well as a member of World Motor Sport Council (WMSC) since 2009. From 2015 to 2020, Gregurek lobbied very strongly and continuously, at the end successfully, for the award of WRC to Croatia.

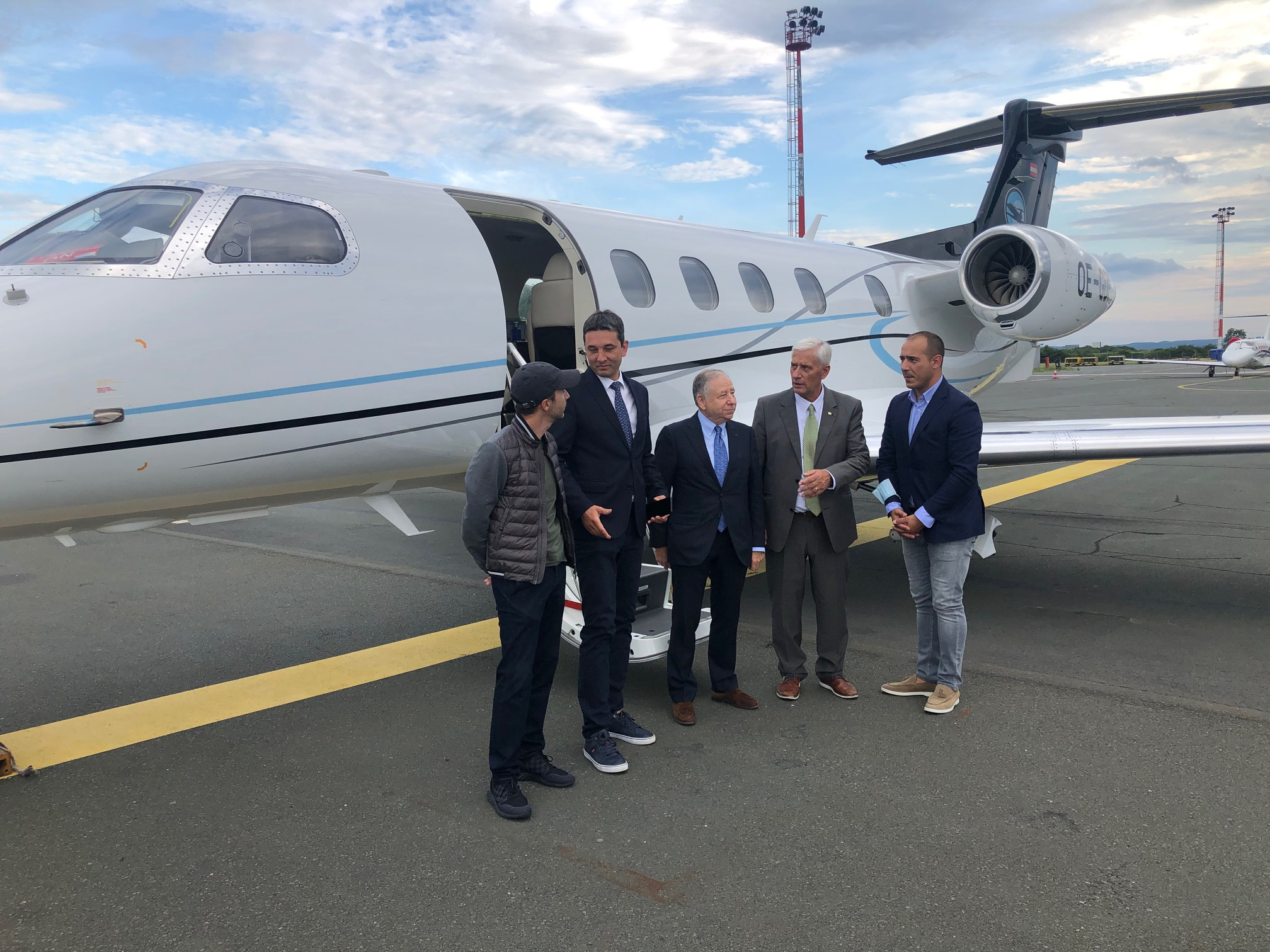
Jean Todt visiting Zagreb for WRC Croatia

After Jean Tod's visit to Zagreb in July 2020, during the next WMSC meeting held in October, the decision on Croatia's inclusion in the FIA WRC Calendar 2021 was adopted. Immediately after the end of the WMSC meeting, Gregurek sent this notice to the Croatian Car and Karting Federation.

"The vision was to display our beautiful country to the world through a sport. We believe we can integrate tourism, technology, science and breathtaking scenery in order to show Croatia in a new light. A concept of 310 kilometers of Special Stages with 1000 more kilometers of liaison shall be revealed any time soon. It is our wish to send out a message of traffic safety and bringing a traffic culture to a higher level. This event is much more than the sport itself."

— Daniel Šaškin, President of Organizing Committee of Croatia Rally in a tv show RTL Direkt.

== List of winners ==
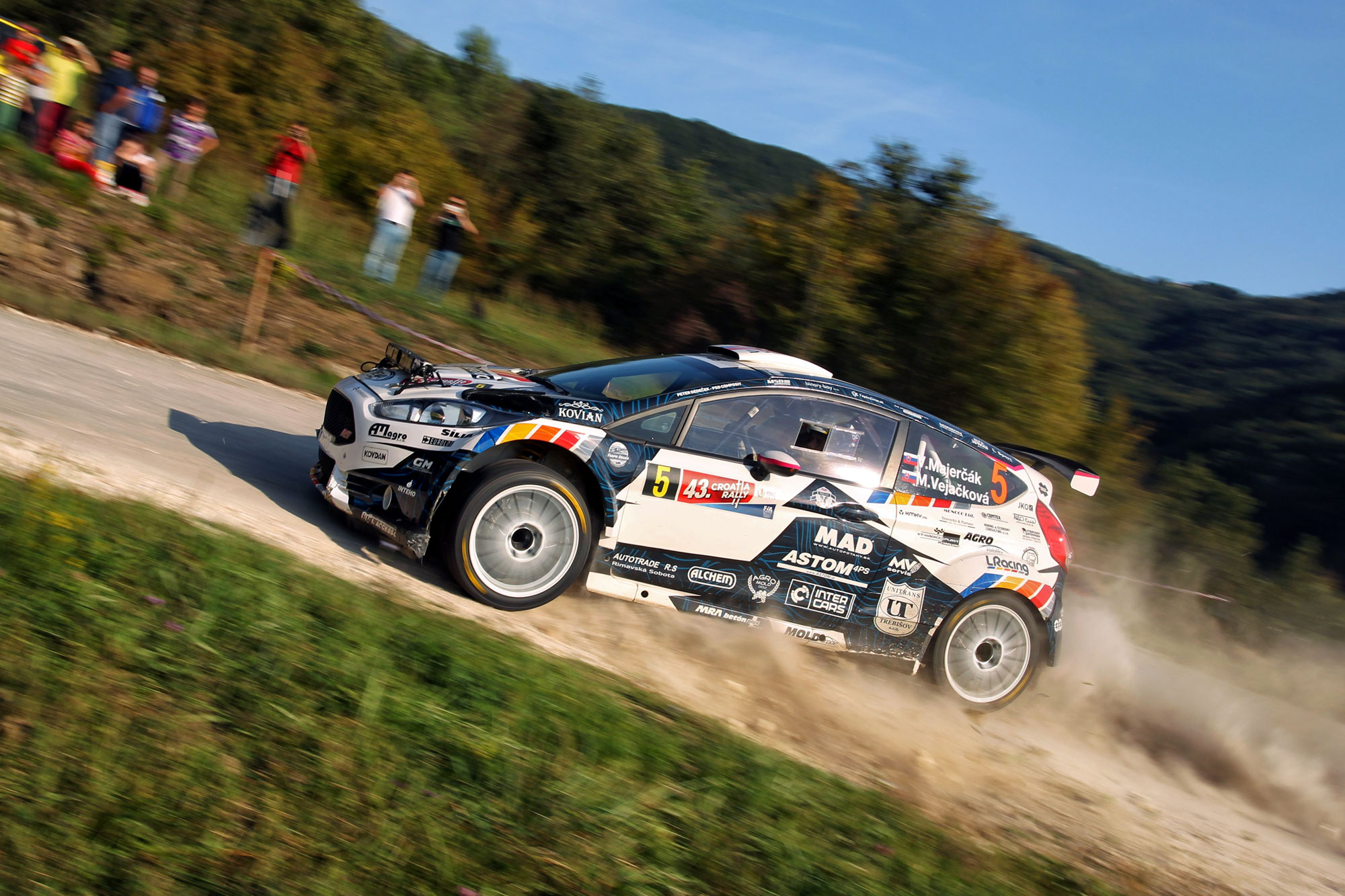
Croatia Rally 2016 Winners Vlastimil Majercak and Michaela Vejackova

Sourced in part from:

Year	Winner	Car
Delta Rally
1974	(Socialist Federal Republic of Yugoslavia) Tomislav Markt	BMW 1600
1975	(Socialist Federal Republic of Yugoslavia) Aleksandar Mačešić	Datsun 1200
1976	(Socialist Federal Republic of Yugoslavia) Berislav Modric	Fiat 128 SC
1977	(Socialist Federal Republic of Yugoslavia) Aleš Pušnik	Renault 5
1978	(Socialist Federal Republic of Yugoslavia) Aleš Pušnik	Renault 5
1979	(Socialist Federal Republic of Yugoslavia) Borko Skurić	Opel Kadett GT/E
1980	(Socialist Federal Republic of Yugoslavia) Leon Poberaj	Zastava 101
1981	(Socialist Federal Republic of Yugoslavia) Leon Poberaj	Zastava 101
1982	(Socialist Federal Republic of Yugoslavia) Borko Skurić	Opel Kadett GT/E
1983	(Socialist Federal Republic of Yugoslavia) Brane Kuzmič	Renault 5 Turbo
1984	(Socialist Federal Republic of Yugoslavia) Brane Kuzmič	Renault 5 Turbo
1985	(Socialist Federal Republic of Yugoslavia) Brane Kuzmič	Renault 5 Turbo
1986	(Socialist Federal Republic of Yugoslavia) Romana Zrnec	Renault 11 Turbo
1987	(Socialist Federal Republic of Yugoslavia) Brane Kuzmič	Renault 5 GT Turbo
1988	(Socialist Federal Republic of Yugoslavia) Brane Kuzmič	Renault 5 GT Turbo
1989	(Socialist Federal Republic of Yugoslavia) Tihomir Filipović	Lancia Delta HF Integrale
1990	(Socialist Federal Republic of Yugoslavia) Tihomir Filipović	Lancia Delta HF Integrale
1991	(Socialist Federal Republic of Yugoslavia) Tihomir Filipović	Lancia Delta HF Integrale
1992	(Croatia) Žarko Šepetavc	Lancia Delta HF Integrale
1993	(Austria) Raimund Baumschlager	Ford Escort RS Cosworth
1994	(Croatia) Niko Pulić	Lancia Delta HF Integrale
1995	(Croatia) Niko Pulić	Lancia Delta HF Integrale
Croatia Delta Rally
1996	(Austria) Kurt Göttlicher	Ford Escort RS Cosworth
1997	(United Kingdom) David Pattison	Ford Escort RS Cosworth
1998	(Italy) Enrico Bertone	Toyota Celica GT-Four
1999	(Italy) Enrico Bertone	Renault Mégane Maxi
2000	(Netherlands) Bert de Jong	Subaru Impreza WRC
2001	(Bulgaria) Krum Donchev	Peugeot 306 Maxi
2002	(Poland) Leszek Kuzaj	Toyota Corolla WRC
2003	(Czech Republic) Václav Pech Jr.	Ford Focus RS WRC
2004	(Croatia) Juraj Šebalj	Subaru Impreza WRX STi
2005	(Croatia) Juraj Šebalj	Citroën C2 S1600
2006	(Czech Republic) Václav Pech Jr.	Mitsubishi Lancer Evo IX
2007	(Croatia) Juraj Šebalj	Mitsubishi Lancer Evo IX
2008	(Italy) Corrado Fontana	Fiat Abarth Grande Punto S2000
Croatia Rally
2009	(Bulgaria) Krum Donchev	Peugeot 207 S2000
2010	(Italy) Luca Rossetti	Fiat Abarth Grande Punto S2000
2011	(Italy) Luca Rossetti	Fiat Abarth Grande Punto S2000
2012	(Finland) Juho Hänninen	Škoda Fabia S2000
2013	(Czech Republic) Jan Kopecký	Škoda Fabia S2000
2014	(Croatia) Juraj Šebalj	Mitsubishi Lancer Evo IX
2015	(Turkey) Murat Bostanci	Ford Fiesta R5
2016	(Slovakia) Vlastimil Majerčak	Ford Fiesta R5
2017	(Hungary) David Botka	Škoda Fabia R5
2018–2020	Not held	
World Rally Championship
2021	(France) Sébastien Ogier	Toyota Yaris WRC
2022	(Finland) Kalle Rovanperä	Toyota GR Yaris Rally1
2023	(United Kingdom) Elfyn Evans	Toyota GR Yaris Rally1
2024	(France) Sébastien Ogier	Toyota GR Yaris Rally1
European Rally Championship
2025	(Republic of Ireland) Jon Armstrong	Ford Fiesta Rally2
World Rally Championship
2026	Takamoto Katsuta	Toyota GR Yaris Rally1
