= Miroslav Janota =

Czech wrestler (born 1948)

Personal information
- Nationality: Czech
- Born: 19 March 1948 (age 77); Teplice nad Bečvou, Czechoslovakia

Sport
- Sport: Wrestling

Miroslav Janota (born 19 March 1948) is a Czech former wrestler. He competed at the 1972 Summer Olympics, the 1976 Summer Olympics and the 1980 Summer Olympics.
