= Harmanli Municipality =

Harmanli Municipality Община Харманли
- Municipality
- Location within Bulgaria
- Coordinates: 41°56′N 25°54′E
- Country: Bulgaria
- Province: Haskovo
- Municipality: Harmanli

Area
  - Total: 694.62 km^{2} (268.19 sq mi)

Population (1-Feb-2011)
  - Total: 24,947
  - Density: 35.915/km^{2} (93.018/sq mi)
- Time zone: UTC+2 (EET)
  - Summer (DST): UTC+3 (EEST)
- Website: www.harmanli.bg

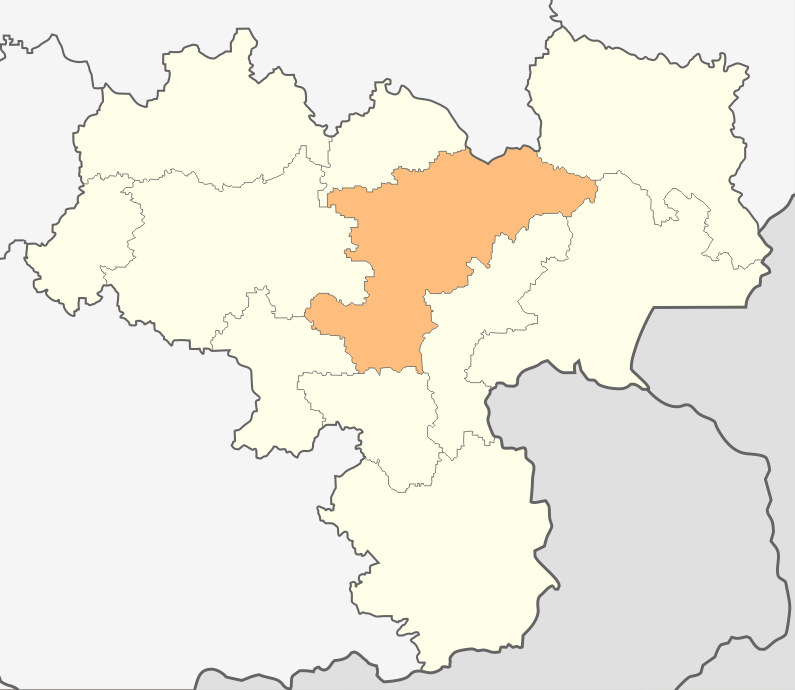
Harmanli municipality within Haskovo Province

Harmanli Municipality is a municipality in Haskovo Province, Bulgaria. The administrative centre is Harmanli.

== Settlements ==
The municipality consists of 1 town (Harmanli) and 24 villages:

- Biser
- Bogomil
- Bolyarski izvor
- Branitsa
- Balgarin
- Varbovo
- Dositeevo
- Dripchevo
- Ivanovo
- Izvorovo
- Kolarovo
- Leshnikovo
- Nadezhden
- Ovcharovo
- Oreshets
- Ostar kamak
- Polyanovo
- Preslavets
- Rogozinovo
- Slavyanovo
- Smirnentsi
- Harmanli
- Cherepovo
- Cherna mogila
- Shishmanovo

== Demography ==
=== Religion ===
According to the latest Bulgarian census of 2011, the religious composition, among those who answered the optional question on religious identification, was the following:

Religious composition of Harmanli Municipality
Orthodox Christianity	80.5%
Catholicism	0.4%
Protestantism	0.8%
Islam	8.3%
No religion	3.7%
Prefer not to answer, others and indefinable	6.3%
