= Wrestling at the 1964 Summer Olympics – Men's Greco-Roman welterweight =

Wrestling at the Olympics

Men's Greco-Roman welterweight at the Games of the XVIII Olympiad
- Venue: Komazawa Gymnasium
- Dates: 16–19 October 1964
- Competitors: 19 from 19 nations

Medalists
1st place, gold medalist(s)		Anatoly Kolesov	Soviet Union
2nd place, silver medalist(s)		Kiril Petkov	Bulgaria
3rd place, bronze medalist(s)		Bertil Nyström	Sweden

The men's Greco-Roman welterweight competition at the 1964 Summer Olympics in Tokyo took place from 16 to 19 October at the Komazawa Gymnasium. Nations were limited to one competitor. Welterweight was the third-heaviest category, including wrestlers weighing 70 to 78 kilograms (154.3 to 172.0 lb).

== Competition format ==
This Greco-Roman wrestling competition continued to use the "bad points" elimination system introduced at the 1928 Summer Olympics for Greco-Roman and at the 1932 Summer Olympics for freestyle wrestling, as adjusted at the 1960 Summer Olympics. Each bout awarded 4 points. If the victory was by fall, the winner received 0 and the loser 4. If the victory was by decision, the winner received 1 and the loser 3. If the bout was tied, each wrestler received 2 points. A wrestler who accumulated 6 or more points was eliminated. Rounds continued until there were 3 or fewer uneliminated wrestlers. If only 1 wrestler remained, he received the gold medal. If 2 wrestlers remained, point totals were ignored and they faced each other for gold and silver (if they had already wrestled each other, that result was used). If 3 wrestlers remained, point totals were ignored and a round-robin was held among those 3 to determine medals (with previous head-to-head results, if any, counting for this round-robin).

== Results ==
=== Round 1 ===
Bouts

Winner	Nation	Victory Type	Loser	Nation
Anatoly Kolesov	Soviet Union	Decision	Sin Dong-ui	South Korea
Ion Ţăranu	Romania	Decision	Kiril Petkov	Bulgaria
Matti Laakso	Finland	Fall	Job Mayo	Philippines
Mithat Bayrak	Turkey	Tie	Bertil Nyström	Sweden
Rudolf Vesper	United Team of Germany	Tie	Sadao Kazama	Japan
Antal Rizmayer	Hungary	Decision	Carlos Alberto Vario	Argentina
Harald Barlie	Norway	Tie	Helmut Längle	Austria
Bolesław Dubicki	Poland	Decision	Russell Camilleri	United States
Albert Michiels	Belgium	Tie	René Schiermeyer	France
Asghar Zoghian	Iran	Bye	N/A	N/A

Points

Rank	Wrestler	Nation	R1
1	Matti Laakso	Finland	0
1	Asghar Zoghian	Iran	0
3	Bolesław Dubicki	Poland	1
3	Anatoly Kolesov	Soviet Union	1
3	Antal Rizmayer	Hungary	1
3	Ion Ţăranu	Romania	1
7	Harald Barlie	Norway	2
7	Mithat Bayrak	Turkey	2
7	Sadao Kazama	Japan	2
7	Helmut Längle	Austria	2
7	Albert Michiels	Belgium	2
7	Bertil Nyström	Sweden	2
7	René Schiermeyer	France	2
7	Rudolf Vesper	United Team of Germany	2
15	Russell Camilleri	United States	3
15	Kiril Petkov	Bulgaria	3
15	Sin Dong-ui	South Korea	3
15	Carlos Alberto Vario	Argentina	3
19	Job Mayo	Philippines	4

=== Round 2 ===
Only 3 of the 19 wrestlers were eliminated. Of the remaining 16, Zoghian had the fewest points, at 1.

Bouts

Winner	Nation	Victory Type	Loser	Nation
Asghar Zoghian	Iran	Decision	Sin Dong-ui	South Korea
Anatoly Kolesov	Soviet Union	Tie	Ion Ţăranu	Romania
Kiril Petkov	Bulgaria	Fall	Job Mayo	Philippines
Mithat Bayrak	Turkey	Decision	Matti Laakso	Finland
Bertil Nyström	Sweden	Decision	Rudolf Vesper	United Team of Germany
Sadao Kazama	Japan	Decision	Antal Rizmayer	Hungary
Harald Barlie	Norway	Fall	Carlos Alberto Vario	Argentina
Russell Camilleri	United States	Decision	Helmut Längle	Austria
Bolesław Dubicki	Poland	Decision	Albert Michiels	Belgium
René Schiermeyer	France	Bye	N/A	N/A

Points

Rank	Wrestler	Nation	R1	R2	Total
1	Asghar Zoghian	Iran	0	1	1
2	Harald Barlie	Norway	2	0	2
2	Bolesław Dubicki	Poland	1	1	2
2	René Schiermeyer	France	2	0	2
5	Mithat Bayrak	Turkey	2	1	3
5	Sadao Kazama	Japan	2	1	3
5	Anatoly Kolesov	Soviet Union	1	2	3
5	Matti Laakso	Finland	0	3	3
5	Bertil Nyström	Sweden	2	1	3
5	Kiril Petkov	Bulgaria	3	0	3
5	Ion Ţăranu	Romania	1	2	3
12	Russell Camilleri	United States	3	1	4
12	Antal Rizmayer	Hungary	1	3	4
14	Helmut Längle	Austria	2	3	5
14	Albert Michiels	Belgium	2	3	5
14	Rudolf Vesper	United Team of Germany	2	3	5
17	Sin Dong-ui	South Korea	3	3	6
18	Carlos Alberto Vario	Argentina	3	4	7
19	Job Mayo	Philippines	4	4	8

=== Round 3 ===
Six of the 16 wrestlers were eliminated. Of the remaining 10, 4 had 5 points, 4 had 4 points, and 2 (Dubicki and Schiermeyer) led with 3 points.

Bouts

Winner	Nation	Victory Type	Loser	Nation
René Schiermeyer	France	Decision	Asghar Zoghian	Iran
Anatoly Kolesov	Soviet Union	Tie	Kiril Petkov	Bulgaria
Ion Ţăranu	Romania	Tie	Matti Laakso	Finland
Rudolf Vesper	United Team of Germany	Decision	Mithat Bayrak	Turkey
Bertil Nyström	Sweden	Decision	Sadao Kazama	Japan
Antal Rizmayer	Hungary	Fall	Harald Barlie	Norway
Bolesław Dubicki	Poland	Decision	Helmut Längle	Austria
Russell Camilleri	United States	Fall	Albert Michiels	Belgium

Points

Rank	Wrestler	Nation	R1	R2	R3	Total
1	Bolesław Dubicki	Poland	1	1	1	3
1	René Schiermeyer	France	2	0	1	3
3	Russell Camilleri	United States	3	1	0	4
3	Bertil Nyström	Sweden	2	1	1	4
3	Antal Rizmayer	Hungary	1	3	0	4
3	Asghar Zoghian	Iran	0	1	3	4
7	Anatoly Kolesov	Soviet Union	1	2	2	5
7	Matti Laakso	Finland	0	3	2	5
7	Kiril Petkov	Bulgaria	3	0	2	5
7	Ion Ţăranu	Romania	1	2	2	5
11	Harald Barlie	Norway	2	0	4	6
11	Mithat Bayrak	Turkey	2	1	3	6
11	Sadao Kazama	Japan	2	1	3	6
11	Rudolf Vesper	United Team of Germany	2	3	1	6
15	Helmut Längle	Austria	2	3	3	8
16	Albert Michiels	Belgium	2	3	4	9

=== Round 4 ===
In a round with potential to eliminate up to 9 of the 10 wrestlers, only 6 were in fact eliminated. The only match where it was guaranteed that at least one wrestler would continue was Rizmayer (4 points) against Dubicki (3 points); all 5 of the other matches had potential for double elimination. Kolesov and Petkov each remained in contention with wins by fall (a win by decision would have eliminated each wrestler). Ţăranu was eliminated despite winning, picking up his 6th point due to the win being by decision. The Nyström vs. Camilleri bout would have resulted in double-elimination if tied, but Nyström won and therefore remained in competition.

Bouts

Winner	Nation	Victory Type	Loser	Nation
Anatoly Kolesov	Soviet Union	Fall	René Schiermeyer	France
Ion Ţăranu	Romania	Decision	Asghar Zoghian	Iran
Kiril Petkov	Bulgaria	Fall	Matti Laakso	Finland
Bertil Nyström	Sweden	Decision	Russell Camilleri	United States
Antal Rizmayer	Hungary	Tie	Bolesław Dubicki	Poland

Points

Rank	Wrestler	Nation	R1	R2	R3	R4	Total
1	Bolesław Dubicki	Poland	1	1	1	2	5
1	Anatoly Kolesov	Soviet Union	1	2	2	0	5
1	Bertil Nyström	Sweden	2	1	1	1	5
1	Kiril Petkov	Bulgaria	3	0	2	0	5
5	Antal Rizmayer	Hungary	1	3	0	2	6
5	Ion Ţăranu	Romania	1	2	2	1	6
7	Russell Camilleri	United States	3	1	0	3	7
7	René Schiermeyer	France	2	0	1	4	7
7	Asghar Zoghian	Iran	0	1	3	3	7
10	Matti Laakso	Finland	0	3	2	4	9

=== Round 5 ===
All four wrestlers started the round even at 5 points. Both bouts were drawn, leaving all four wrestlers eliminated at the same time and with the same score of 7 points. A final round was needed to finish the four-way round-robin.

Bouts

Winner	Nation	Victory Type	Loser	Nation
Anatoly Kolesov	Soviet Union	Tie	Bertil Nyström	Sweden
Kiril Petkov	Bulgaria	Tie	Bolesław Dubicki	Poland

Points

Rank	Wrestler	Nation	R1	R2	R3	R4	R5	Total
1	Bolesław Dubicki	Poland	1	1	1	2	2	7
1	Anatoly Kolesov	Soviet Union	1	2	2	0	2	7
1	Bertil Nyström	Sweden	2	1	1	1	2	7
1	Kiril Petkov	Bulgaria	3	0	2	0	2	7

=== Final round ===
The four-way round-robin to determine the top 4 places carried over three results from prior rounds, all ties: Kolesov and Petkov in round 3, Kolesov and Nyström in round 5, and Petkov and Dubicki in round 5. In the final round, Kolesov began with by defeating Dubicki; Kolesov therefore finished at 1-0-2 (5 points). Petkov and Nyström tied, so Petkov finished at 0-0-3 (6 points). Nyström and Dubicki then tied; Nyström finished at 0-0-3 (6 points) to match Petkov, while Dubicki had the only loss of the round-robin for a 0-1-2 (7 points) finish. With Petkov and Nyström even at 6 points in the round-robin and tied head-to-head, total bad points was used as the next tie-breaker to give Petkov the silver medal.

Bouts

Winner	Nation	Victory Type	Loser	Nation
Anatoly Kolesov	Soviet Union	Tie (Round 3)	Kiril Petkov	Bulgaria
Anatoly Kolesov	Soviet Union	Tie (Round 5)	Bertil Nyström	Sweden
Kiril Petkov	Bulgaria	Tie (Round 5)	Bolesław Dubicki	Poland
Anatoly Kolesov	Soviet Union	Decision	Bolesław Dubicki	Poland
Kiril Petkov	Bulgaria	Tie	Bertil Nyström	Sweden
Bertil Nyström	Sweden	Tie	Bolesław Dubicki	Poland

Points

Rank	Wrestler	Nation	Points	R1	R2	R3	R4	R5	FR	Total
1st place, gold medalist(s)	Anatoly Kolesov	Soviet Union	5	1	2	2	0	2	1	8
2nd place, silver medalist(s)	Kiril Petkov	Bulgaria	6	3	0	2	0	2	2	9
3rd place, bronze medalist(s)	Bertil Nyström	Sweden	6	2	1	1	1	2	4	11
4	Bolesław Dubicki	Poland	7	1	1	1	2	2	5	12
