= Wrestling at the 1960 Summer Olympics – Men's Greco-Roman middleweight =

Wrestling at the Olympics

Men's Greco-Roman middleweight at the Games of the XVII Olympiad
- Venue: Basilica of Maxentius
- Dates: 26–31 August 1960
- Competitors: 24 from 24 nations

Medalists
1st place, gold medalist(s)		Dimitar Dobrev	Bulgaria
2nd place, silver medalist(s)		Lothar Metz	United Team of Germany
3rd place, bronze medalist(s)		Ion Ţăranu	Romania

The men's Greco-Roman middleweight competition at the 1960 Summer Olympics in Rome took place from 26 to 31 August at the Basilica of Maxentius. Nations were limited to one competitor. Middleweight was the third-heaviest category, including wrestlers weighing 73 to 79 kilograms (160.9 to 174.2 lb).

== Competition format ==
This Greco-Roman wrestling competition continued to use the "bad points" elimination system introduced at the 1928 Summer Olympics for Greco-Roman and at the 1932 Summer Olympics for freestyle wrestling, though adjusted the point values slightly. Wins by fall continued to be worth 0 points and wins by decision continued to be worth 1 point. Losses by fall, however, were now worth 4 points (up from 3). Losses by decision were worth 3 points (consistent with most prior years, though in some losses by split decision had been worth only 2 points). Ties were now allowed, worth 2 points for each wrestler. The elimination threshold was also increased from 5 points to 6 points. The medal round concept, used in 1952 and 1956 requiring a round-robin amongst the medalists even if one or more finished a round with enough points for elimination, was used only if exactly three wrestlers remained after a round—if two competitors remained, they faced off head-to-head; if only one, he was the gold medalist.

== Results ==
=== Round 1 ===
Gurics withdrew after his bout.

Bouts

Winner	Nation	Victory Type	Loser	Nation
Oddvar Barlie	Norway	Tie	Bolesław Dubicki	Poland
Ronald Hunt	Australia	Tie	Hammou Haddaoui Khadir	Morocco
Pentti Punkari	Finland	Tie	Mansour Hazrati	Iran
Jiří Kormaník	Czechoslovakia	Decision	André Lamy	France
Kazım Ayvaz	Turkey	Decision	Marziano Magnani	Italy
Lothar Metz	United Team of Germany	Fall	Raymond Schummer	Luxembourg
Russell Camilleri	United States	Decision	Charles Berthoud	Switzerland
Yacoub Romanos	Lebanon	Fall	Helmut Längle	Austria
Nikolay Chuchalov	Soviet Union	Fall	Leopold Israelsson	Sweden
Dimitar Dobrev	Bulgaria	Fall	Luís Caldas	Portugal
György Gurics	Hungary	Decision	Albert Michiels	Belgium
Ion Ţăranu	Romania	Fall	Noboru Aomi	Japan

Points

Rank	Wrestler	Nation	Start	Earned	Total
1	Nikolay Chuchalov	Soviet Union	0	0	0
1	Dimitar Dobrev	Bulgaria	0	0	0
1	Lothar Metz	United Team of Germany	0	0	0
1	Yacoub Romanos	Lebanon	0	0	0
1	Ion Ţăranu	Romania	0	0	0
6	Kazım Ayvaz	Turkey	0	1	1
6	Russell Camilleri	United States	0	1	1
6	Jiří Kormaník	Czechoslovakia	0	1	1
9	Oddvar Barlie	Norway	0	2	2
9	Bolesław Dubicki	Poland	0	2	2
9	Hammou Haddaoui Khadir	Morocco	0	2	2
9	Mansour Hazrati	Iran	0	2	2
9	Ronald Hunt	Australia	0	2	2
9	Pentti Punkari	Finland	0	2	2
15	Charles Berthoud	Switzerland	0	3	3
15	André Lamy	France	0	3	3
15	Marziano Magnani	Italy	0	3	3
15	Albert Michiels	Belgium	0	3	3
19	Noboru Aomi	Japan	0	4	4
19	Luís Caldas	Portugal	0	4	4
19	Leopold Israelsson	Sweden	0	4	4
19	Helmut Längle	Austria	0	4	4
19	Raymond Schummer	Luxembourg	0	4	4
24	György Gurics	Hungary	0	1	1*

=== Round 2 ===
Bouts

Winner	Nation	Victory Type	Loser	Nation
Oddvar Barlie	Norway	Fall	Ronald Hunt	Australia
Bolesław Dubicki	Poland	Fall	Hammou Haddaoui Khadir	Morocco
Pentti Punkari	Finland	Decision	André Lamy	France
Jiří Kormaník	Czechoslovakia	Decision	Mansour Hazrati	Iran
Lothar Metz	United Team of Germany	Decision	Marziano Magnani	Italy
Kazım Ayvaz	Turkey	Fall	Raymond Schummer	Luxembourg
Russell Camilleri	United States	Fall	Helmut Längle	Austria
Yacoub Romanos	Lebanon	Decision	Charles Berthoud	Switzerland
Dimitar Dobrev	Bulgaria	Decision	Nikolay Chuchalov	Soviet Union
Leopold Israelsson	Sweden	Fall	Luís Caldas	Portugal
Albert Michiels	Belgium	Decision	Noboru Aomi	Japan
Ion Ţăranu	Romania	Bye	N/A	N/A

Points

Rank	Wrestler	Nation	Start	Earned	Total
1	Ion Ţăranu	Romania	0	0	0
2	Kazım Ayvaz	Turkey	1	0	1
2	Russell Camilleri	United States	1	0	1
2	Dimitar Dobrev	Bulgaria	0	1	1
2	Lothar Metz	United Team of Germany	0	1	1
2	Yacoub Romanos	Lebanon	0	1	1
7	Oddvar Barlie	Norway	2	0	2
7	Bolesław Dubicki	Poland	2	0	2
7	Jiří Kormaník	Czechoslovakia	1	1	2
10	Nikolay Chuchalov	Soviet Union	0	3	3
10	Pentti Punkari	Finland	2	1	3
12	Leopold Israelsson	Sweden	4	0	4
12	Albert Michiels	Belgium	3	1	4
14	Mansour Hazrati	Iran	2	3	5
15	Charles Berthoud	Switzerland	3	3	6
15	Hammou Haddaoui Khadir	Morocco	2	4	6
15	Ronald Hunt	Australia	2	4	6
15	André Lamy	France	3	3	6
15	Marziano Magnani	Italy	3	3	6
20	Noboru Aomi	Japan	4	3	7
21	Luís Caldas	Portugal	4	4	8
21	Helmut Längle	Austria	4	4	8
21	Raymond Schummer	Luxembourg	4	4	8

=== Round 3 ===
Bouts

Winner	Nation	Victory Type	Loser	Nation
Ion Ţăranu	Romania	Fall	Oddvar Barlie	Norway
Bolesław Dubicki	Poland	Decision	Pentti Punkari	Finland
Kazım Ayvaz	Turkey	Decision	Mansour Hazrati	Iran
Lothar Metz	United Team of Germany	Tie	Jiří Kormaník	Czechoslovakia
Russell Camilleri	United States	Tie	Yacoub Romanos	Lebanon
Nikolay Chuchalov	Soviet Union	Decision	Albert Michiels	Belgium
Dimitar Dobrev	Bulgaria	Decision	Leopold Israelsson	Sweden

Points

Rank	Wrestler	Nation	Start	Earned	Total
1	Ion Ţăranu	Romania	0	0	0
2	Kazım Ayvaz	Turkey	1	1	2
2	Dimitar Dobrev	Bulgaria	1	1	2
4	Russell Camilleri	United States	1	2	3
4	Bolesław Dubicki	Poland	2	1	3
4	Lothar Metz	United Team of Germany	1	2	3
4	Yacoub Romanos	Lebanon	1	2	3
8	Nikolay Chuchalov	Soviet Union	3	1	4
8	Jiří Kormaník	Czechoslovakia	2	2	4
10	Oddvar Barlie	Norway	2	4	6
10	Pentti Punkari	Finland	3	3	6
12	Leopold Israelsson	Sweden	4	3	7
12	Albert Michiels	Belgium	4	3	7
14	Mansour Hazrati	Iran	5	3	8

=== Round 4 ===
Bouts

Winner	Nation	Victory Type	Loser	Nation
Ion Ţăranu	Romania	Tie	Bolesław Dubicki	Poland
Kazım Ayvaz	Turkey	Fall	Jiří Kormaník	Czechoslovakia
Lothar Metz	United Team of Germany	Fall	Russell Camilleri	United States
Nikolay Chuchalov	Soviet Union	Fall	Yacoub Romanos	Lebanon
Dimitar Dobrev	Bulgaria	Bye	N/A	N/A

Points

Rank	Wrestler	Nation	Start	Earned	Total
1	Kazım Ayvaz	Turkey	2	0	2
1	Dimitar Dobrev	Bulgaria	2	0	2
1	Ion Ţăranu	Romania	0	2	2
4	Lothar Metz	United Team of Germany	3	0	3
5	Nikolay Chuchalov	Soviet Union	4	0	4
6	Bolesław Dubicki	Poland	3	2	5
7	Russell Camilleri	United States	3	4	7
7	Yacoub Romanos	Lebanon	3	4	7
9	Jiří Kormaník	Czechoslovakia	4	4	8

=== Round 5 ===
Bouts

Winner	Nation	Victory Type	Loser	Nation
Dimitar Dobrev	Bulgaria	Decision	Ion Ţăranu	Romania
Bolesław Dubicki	Poland	Tie	Kazım Ayvaz	Turkey
Lothar Metz	United Team of Germany	Decision	Nikolay Chuchalov	Soviet Union

Points

Rank	Wrestler	Nation	Start	Earned	Total
1	Dimitar Dobrev	Bulgaria	2	1	3
2	Kazım Ayvaz	Turkey	2	2	4
2	Lothar Metz	United Team of Germany	3	1	4
4	Ion Ţăranu	Romania	2	3	5
5	Nikolay Chuchalov	Soviet Union	4	3	7
5	Bolesław Dubicki	Poland	5	2	7

=== Round 6 ===
Bouts

Winner	Nation	Victory Type	Loser	Nation
Dimitar Dobrev	Bulgaria	Decision	Kazım Ayvaz	Turkey
Ion Ţăranu	Romania	Tie	Lothar Metz	United Team of Germany

Points

Rank	Wrestler	Nation	Start	Earned	Total
1st place, gold medalist(s)	Dimitar Dobrev	Bulgaria	3	1	4
2nd place, silver medalist(s)	Lothar Metz	United Team of Germany	4	2	6
3	Kazım Ayvaz	Turkey	4	3	7
3	Ion Ţăranu	Romania	5	2	7

=== Bronze medal bout ===
Ţăranu and Ayvaz finished round 6 tied for 3rd at 7 points and had not faced each other; they competed in a bronze medal bout, won by Ţăranu.

Bouts

Winner	Nation	Victory Type	Loser	Nation
Ion Ţăranu	Romania	Decision	Kazım Ayvaz	Turkey

Points

Rank	Wrestler	Nation	Start	Earned	Total
3rd place, bronze medalist(s)	Ion Ţăranu	Romania	7	1	8
4	Kazım Ayvaz	Turkey	7	3	10
