= Wrestling at the 1960 Summer Olympics – Men's Greco-Roman welterweight =

Wrestling at the Olympics

Men's Greco-Roman welterweight at the Games of the XVII Olympiad
- Venue: Basilica of Maxentius
- Dates: 26–31 August 1960
- Competitors: 27 from 27 nations

Medalists
1st place, gold medalist(s)		Mithat Bayrak	Turkey
2nd place, silver medalist(s)		Günther Maritschnigg	United Team of Germany
3rd place, bronze medalist(s)		René Schiermeyer	France

The men's Greco-Roman welterweight competition at the 1960 Summer Olympics in Rome took place from 26 to 31 August at the Basilica of Maxentius. Nations were limited to one competitor. Welterweight was the fourth-heaviest category, including wrestlers weighing 67 to 73 kilograms (147.7 to 160.9 lb).

== Competition format ==
This Greco-Roman wrestling competition continued to use the "bad points" elimination system introduced at the 1928 Summer Olympics for Greco-Roman and at the 1932 Summer Olympics for freestyle wrestling, though adjusted the point values slightly. Wins by fall continued to be worth 0 points and wins by decision continued to be worth 1 point. Losses by fall, however, were now worth 4 points (up from 3). Losses by decision were worth 3 points (consistent with most prior years, though in some losses by split decision had been worth only 2 points). Ties were now allowed, worth 2 points for each wrestler. The elimination threshold was also increased from 5 points to 6 points. The medal round concept, used in 1952 and 1956 requiring a round-robin amongst the medalists even if one or more finished a round with enough points for elimination, was used only if exactly three wrestlers remained after a round—if two competitors remained, they faced off head-to-head; if only one, he was the gold medalist.

== Results ==
=== Round 1 ===
Rosbag was injured during his bout and was unable to continue.

Bouts

Winner	Nation	Victory Type	Loser	Nation
Harald Barlie	Norway	Decision	Ángel Cuetos	Spain
Hryhoriy Hamarnik	Soviet Union	Decision	Bjarne Ansbøl	Denmark
Sachihiko Takeda	Japan	Decision	Karel Oomen	Belgium
Valeriu Bularcă	Romania	Tie	Kiril Petkov	Bulgaria
Günther Maritschnigg	United Team of Germany	Decision	Fritz Fivian	United States
Hans-Jörg Hirschbühl	Switzerland	Fall	Hicham Ido	Lebanon
Matti Laakso	Finland	Decision	Bernard Philippe	Luxembourg
Franco Benedetti	Italy	Decision	Robert Clark	Australia
René Schiermeyer	France	Fall	Edward Żuławnik	Poland
Ben Ali	United Arab Republic	Decision	Sam Azoulay	Morocco
Bertil Nyström	Sweden	Injured	Ab Rosbag	Netherlands
Franz Berger	Austria	Decision	Juan Rolón	Argentina
Mithat Bayrak	Turkey	Decision	Stevan Horvat	Yugoslavia
Antal Rizmayer	Hungary	Bye	N/A	N/A

Points

Rank	Wrestler	Nation	Start	Earned	Total
1	Hans-Jörg Hirschbühl	Switzerland	0	0	0
1	Bertil Nyström	Sweden	0	0	0
1	Antal Rizmayer	Hungary	0	0	0
1	René Schiermeyer	France	0	0	0
5	Ben Ali	United Arab Republic	0	1	1
5	Harald Barlie	Norway	0	1	1
5	Mithat Bayrak	Turkey	0	1	1
5	Franco Benedetti	Italy	0	1	1
5	Franz Berger	Austria	0	1	1
5	Hryhoriy Hamarnik	Soviet Union	0	1	1
5	Matti Laakso	Finland	0	1	1
5	Günther Maritschnigg	United Team of Germany	0	1	1
5	Sachihiko Takeda	Japan	0	1	1
14	Valeriu Bularcă	Romania	0	2	2
14	Kiril Petkov	Bulgaria	0	2	2
16	Bjarne Ansbøl	Denmark	0	3	3
16	Sam Azoulay	Morocco	0	3	3
16	Robert Clark	Australia	0	3	3
16	Ángel Cuetos	Spain	0	3	3
16	Fritz Fivian	United States	0	3	3
16	Stevan Horvat	Yugoslavia	0	3	3
16	Karel Oomen	Belgium	0	3	3
16	Bernard Philippe	Luxembourg	0	3	3
16	Juan Rolón	Argentina	0	3	3
25	Hicham Ido	Lebanon	0	4	4
25	Edward Żuławnik	Poland	0	4	4
27	Ab Rosbag	Netherlands	0	4	4*

=== Round 2 ===
Bouts

Winner	Nation	Victory Type	Loser	Nation
Antal Rizmayer	Hungary	Decision	Ángel Cuetos	Spain
Hryhoriy Hamarnik	Soviet Union	Decision	Harald Barlie	Norway
Bjarne Ansbøl	Denmark	Tie	Sachihiko Takeda	Japan
Valeriu Bularcă	Romania	Decision	Karel Oomen	Belgium
Kiril Petkov	Bulgaria	Decision	Fritz Fivian	United States
Günther Maritschnigg	United Team of Germany	Fall	Hicham Ido	Lebanon
Matti Laakso	Finland	Decision	Hans-Jörg Hirschbühl	Switzerland
Robert Clark	Australia	Decision	Bernard Philippe	Luxembourg
Franco Benedetti	Italy	Tie	René Schiermeyer	France
Sam Azoulay	Morocco	Walkover	Edward Żuławnik	Poland
Ben Ali	United Arab Republic	Tie	Bertil Nyström	Sweden
Mithat Bayrak	Turkey	Fall	Franz Berger	Austria
Stevan Horvat	Yugoslavia	Fall	Juan Rolón	Argentina

Points

Rank	Wrestler	Nation	Start	Earned	Total
1	Mithat Bayrak	Turkey	1	0	1
1	Günther Maritschnigg	United Team of Germany	1	0	1
1	Antal Rizmayer	Hungary	0	1	1
4	Hryhoriy Hamarnik	Soviet Union	1	1	2
4	Matti Laakso	Finland	1	1	2
4	Bertil Nyström	Sweden	0	2	2
4	René Schiermeyer	France	0	2	2
8	Ben Ali	United Arab Republic	1	2	3
8	Sam Azoulay	Morocco	3	0	3
8	Franco Benedetti	Italy	1	2	3
8	Valeriu Bularcă	Romania	2	1	3
8	Hans-Jörg Hirschbühl	Switzerland	0	3	3
8	Stevan Horvat	Yugoslavia	3	0	3
8	Kiril Petkov	Bulgaria	2	1	3
8	Sachihiko Takeda	Japan	1	2	3
16	Harald Barlie	Norway	1	3	4
16	Robert Clark	Australia	3	1	4
18	Bjarne Ansbøl	Denmark	3	2	5
18	Franz Berger	Austria	1	4	5
20	Ángel Cuetos	Spain	3	3	6
20	Fritz Fivian	United States	3	3	6
20	Karel Oomen	Belgium	3	3	6
20	Bernard Philippe	Luxembourg	3	3	6
24	Juan Rolón	Argentina	3	4	7
25	Hicham Ido	Lebanon	4	4	8
25	Edward Żuławnik	Poland	4	4	8

=== Round 3 ===
Bouts

Winner	Nation	Victory Type	Loser	Nation
Antal Rizmayer	Hungary	Decision	Harald Barlie	Norway
Hryhoriy Hamarnik	Soviet Union	Fall	Sachihiko Takeda	Japan
Bjarne Ansbøl	Denmark	Fall	Valeriu Bularcă	Romania
Kiril Petkov	Bulgaria	Decision	Günther Maritschnigg	United Team of Germany
Hans-Jörg Hirschbühl	Switzerland	Fall	Robert Clark	Australia
Matti Laakso	Finland	Decision	Franco Benedetti	Italy
René Schiermeyer	France	Fall	Sam Azoulay	Morocco
Franz Berger	Austria	Decision	Ben Ali	United Arab Republic
Mithat Bayrak	Turkey	Decision	Bertil Nyström	Sweden
Stevan Horvat	Yugoslavia	Bye	N/A	N/A

Points

Rank	Wrestler	Nation	Start	Earned	Total
1	Mithat Bayrak	Turkey	1	1	2
1	Hryhoriy Hamarnik	Soviet Union	2	0	2
1	Antal Rizmayer	Hungary	1	1	2
1	René Schiermeyer	France	2	0	2
5	Hans-Jörg Hirschbühl	Switzerland	3	0	3
5	Matti Laakso	Finland	2	1	3
5	Stevan Horvat	Yugoslavia	3	0	3
8	Günther Maritschnigg	United Team of Germany	1	3	4
8	Kiril Petkov	Bulgaria	3	1	4
10	Bjarne Ansbøl	Denmark	5	0	5
10	Bertil Nyström	Sweden	2	3	5
12	Ben Ali	United Arab Republic	3	3	6
12	Franco Benedetti	Italy	3	3	6
12	Franz Berger	Austria	5	1	6
15	Sam Azoulay	Morocco	3	4	7
15	Harald Barlie	Norway	4	3	7
15	Valeriu Bularcă	Romania	3	4	7
15	Sachihiko Takeda	Japan	3	4	7
19	Robert Clark	Australia	4	4	8

=== Round 4 ===
Bouts

Winner	Nation	Victory Type	Loser	Nation
Stevan Horvat	Yugoslavia	Decision	Antal Rizmayer	Hungary
Hryhoriy Hamarnik	Soviet Union	Fall	Kiril Petkov	Bulgaria
Günther Maritschnigg	United Team of Germany	Decision	Bjarne Ansbøl	Denmark
René Schiermeyer	France	Fall	Hans-Jörg Hirschbühl	Switzerland
Matti Laakso	Finland	Injured	Bertil Nyström	Sweden
Mithat Bayrak	Turkey	Bye	N/A	N/A

Points

Rank	Wrestler	Nation	Start	Earned	Total
1	Mithat Bayrak	Turkey	2	0	2
1	Hryhoriy Hamarnik	Soviet Union	2	0	2
1	René Schiermeyer	France	2	0	2
4	Matti Laakso	Finland	3	0	3
5	Stevan Horvat	Yugoslavia	3	1	4
6	Günther Maritschnigg	United Team of Germany	4	1	5
6	Antal Rizmayer	Hungary	2	3	5
8	Hans-Jörg Hirschbühl	Switzerland	3	4	7
9	Bjarne Ansbøl	Denmark	5	3	8
9	Kiril Petkov	Bulgaria	4	4	8
11	Bertil Nyström	Sweden	5	4	9

=== Round 5 ===
Bouts

Winner	Nation	Victory Type	Loser	Nation
Mithat Bayrak	Turkey	Decision	Antal Rizmayer	Hungary
Stevan Horvat	Yugoslavia	Decision	Hryhoriy Hamarnik	Soviet Union
Günther Maritschnigg	United Team of Germany	Fall	Matti Laakso	Finland
René Schiermeyer	France	Bye	N/A	N/A

Points

Rank	Wrestler	Nation	Start	Earned	Total
1	René Schiermeyer	France	2	0	2
2	Mithat Bayrak	Turkey	2	1	3
3	Hryhoriy Hamarnik	Soviet Union	2	3	5
3	Stevan Horvat	Yugoslavia	4	1	5
3	Günther Maritschnigg	United Team of Germany	5	0	5
6	Matti Laakso	Finland	3	4	7
7	Antal Rizmayer	Hungary	5	3	8

=== Round 6 ===
Bouts

Winner	Nation	Victory Type	Loser	Nation
Stevan Horvat	Yugoslavia	Decision	René Schiermeyer	France
Mithat Bayrak	Turkey	Tie	Hryhoriy Hamarnik	Soviet Union
Günther Maritschnigg	United Team of Germany	Bye	N/A	N/A

Points

Rank	Wrestler	Nation	Start	Earned	Total
1	Mithat Bayrak	Turkey	3	2	5
1	Günther Maritschnigg	United Team of Germany	5	0	5
1	René Schiermeyer	France	2	3	5
4	Stevan Horvat	Yugoslavia	5	1	6
5	Hryhoriy Hamarnik	Soviet Union	5	2	7

=== Round 7 ===
All three remaining wrestlers had 5 points and none had faced either of the others. Rather than giving one of the wrestlers the substantial advantage of a bye in this round, the three men faced each other in a round-robin.

Bouts

Winner	Nation	Victory Type	Loser	Nation
Günther Maritschnigg	United Team of Germany	Decision	René Schiermeyer	France
Mithat Bayrak	Turkey	Fall	Günther Maritschnigg	United Team of Germany
Mithat Bayrak	Turkey	Decision	René Schiermeyer	France

Points

Rank	Wrestler	Nation	Start	Earned	Total
1st place, gold medalist(s)	Mithat Bayrak	Turkey	5	1	6
2nd place, silver medalist(s)	Günther Maritschnigg	United Team of Germany	5	5	10
3rd place, bronze medalist(s)	René Schiermeyer	France	5	7	12
