= II-76 road (Bulgaria) =

Road in Bulgaria

Republic Road I-76
- Републикански път I-76

Route information
- Length: 67.2 km (41.8 mi)

Major junctions
- From: Km 306.4 of I-7
- To: Km 336.1 of I-8, Harmanli

Location
- Country: Bulgaria
- Towns: Topolovgrad, Harmanli

Highway system
- Highways in Bulgaria

Republican Road II-76 (Bulgarian: Републикански път II-76) is a 2nd class road in southeastern Bulgaria, running through the territory of Yambol and Haskovo Provinces. Its length is 67.2 km.

== Route description ==
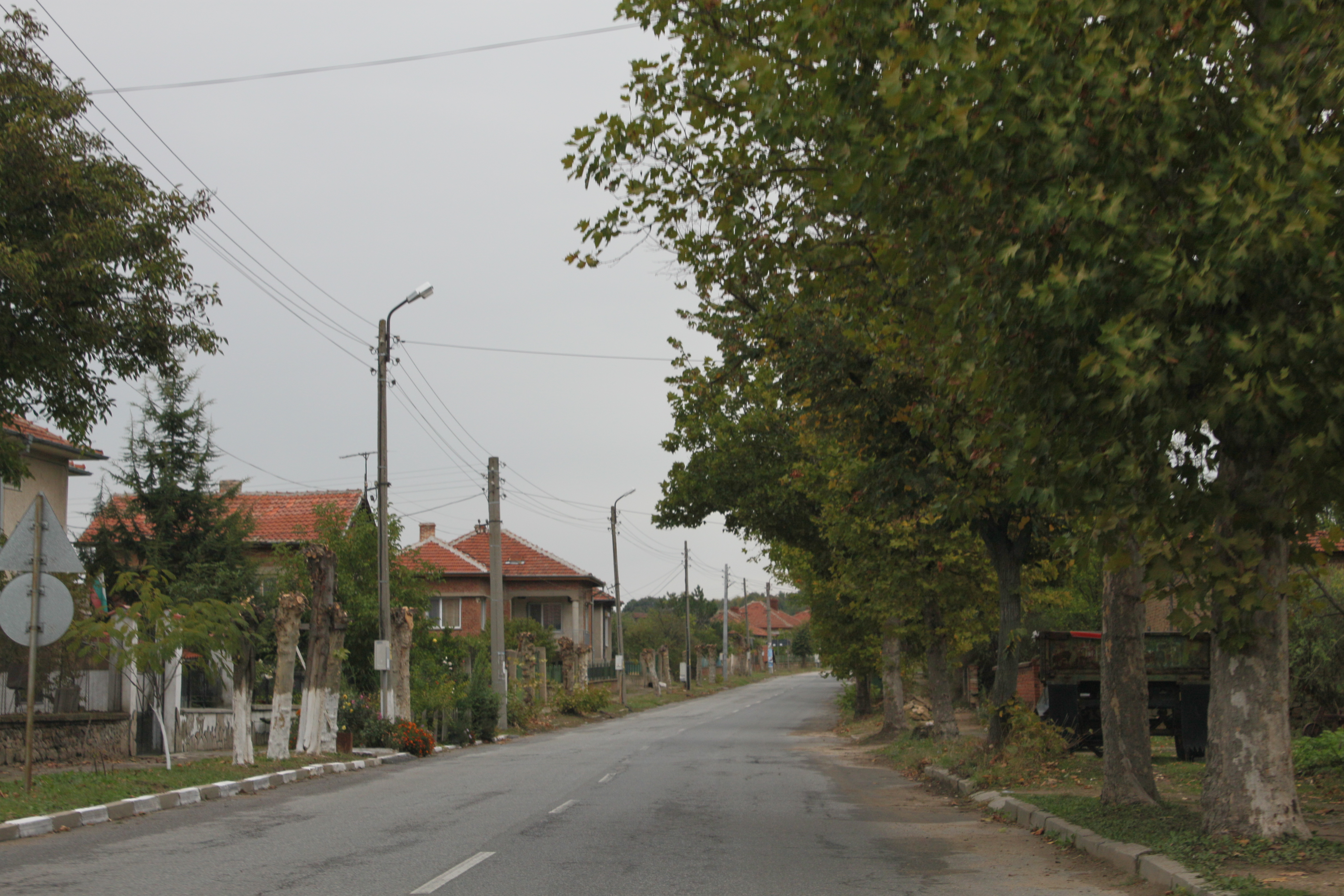
II-76 passing through the village of Balgarin

The road starts at Km 306.4 of the first class I-7 road north of the village of Granitovo in Yambol Province, and heads southwest through the hilly part of the Elhovo Field. After 1.6 km it crosses the river Tundzha, enters Haskovo Province, passes through the village of Knyazhevo and reaches the town of Topolovgrad. West of the town the road enters the northwestern parts of the small Sakar mountain range, passes through the villages of Hlyabovo and Balgarska Polyana, intersects with the second class II-55 road, reaches the ridge of Sakar and gradually descents to the valley of the Maritsa, passing through the villages of Cherepovo, Branitsa, Bogomil and Balgarin. East of the town of Harmanli the road crosses the Maritsa, forms a junction at Km 71 of the Maritsa motorway and intersects with Km 336.1 of the first class I-8 road.
