= Lenko Latkov =

Bulgarian rapist and serial killer

- Born: 1975; Harmanli, Haskovo Province, People's Republic of Bulgaria
- Died: 13 September 2003 (aged 28); Stara Zagora, Stara Zagora Province, Bulgaria
- Cause of death: Strangulation
- Conviction: N/A
- Penalty: N/A

Details
- Victims: 3–6
- Span of crimes: 1999–2000
- Country: Bulgaria
- States: Haskovo (confirmed); Plovdiv (suspected)
- Date apprehended: 13 March 2003

Lenko Latkov (Bulgarian: Ленко Латков; 1975 – 13 September 2003) was a Bulgarian rapist, pedophile and serial killer, responsible for killing three elderly women in the Haskovo Province from 1999 to 2000, as well as several rapes. He was also suspected of another three similar murders in the Plovdiv Province. Latkov was murdered prior to his trial by his cellmate Sami Bayram Aptullah (AKA Sali Abdullah), who was serving time for an attempted murder.

== Biography ==
Lenko Latkov was born in 1975 in Harmanli, the child of a prostitute and an unknown father. His mother abandoned him at an orphanage in Slavyanovo shortly after his birth, and in his formative years, Latkov was adopted by several different families who later changed their minds and returned him to the orphanage. It is believed that he started harboring resentment towards women from an early age, possibly due to being abandoned by his mother.

At around the age of eight, Latkov was raped by older boys at the orphanage, but seemingly never told anybody. He himself would later be convicted of attempted rape of a young boy at age 16, after which he was imprisoned in Veliko Tarnovo for some time. The mentally-ill man was released despite the charges, only to be rearrested years later on 13 March 2003, for kidnapping and raping a 13-year-old boy from a Haskovo bus stop. Following a 5-hour long interrogation, he confessed to raping a 16-year-old girl in Veliko Tarnovo and the murder of three elderly women in the Haskovo Province:

- Lilyana Ivanova (84), murdered in Haskovo, 1999
- Kaluda Golemanova, murdered in Lyubimets, 2000
- Elena Atanasova (71), died after brutal torture in Biser, 2000

Latkov was also a prime suspect in another three murders committed in the Plovdiv Province, but no information is available about these murders. Following his arrest, he was moved into a psychiatric hospital in Lovech. There, ten days before his death, he wrote a letter to the investigating authorities in Haskovo in which he talked about his loneliness, his appreciation of their humane treatment towards him and a request for some cigarettes.

== Death ==
After reevaluations from psychologists and investigators alike, Latkov was moved to a prison in Stara Zagora, where he shared a cell with Sami Bayram Aptullah, another mentally-ill prisoner serving an 8-year sentence for attempted murder. On 13 September, the two began arguing about something, with the physically stronger Aptullah beating up and strangling Latkov in a matter of seconds. Shortly after, he began banging at his cell door, attracting the attention of guards and medical personnel who tried to save Latkov's life, but to no avail. Following this event, Aptullah was moved into a solitary cell.

== See also ==
- List of serial killers by country
