= Barlie =

Barlie is a Norwegian surname. Notable people with the surname include:

- Harald Barlie (1937–1995), wrestler
- Ine Barlie (born 1965), wrestler
- Lene Barlie, wrestler
- Mette Barlie, wrestler
- Oddvar Barlie (1929–2017), wrestler
- Vegar Barlie (born 1972), ice hockey player
