= Izvorovo =

Izvorovo may refer to the following places in Bulgaria:

- Izvorovo, Dobrich Province, village in Dobrich Province, Bulgaria
- Izvorovo, Haskovo Province, village in Haskovo Province, Bulgaria
- Izvorovo, Plovdiv Province
- Izvorovo, Stara Zagora Province
- Izvorovo, Targovishte Province
