= Slavyanovo (disambiguation) =

Slavyanovo may refer to:

- in Bulgaria (written in Cyrillic as Славяново):
  - Slavyanovo - a town in Pleven municipality, Pleven Province
  - Slavyanovo, Haskovo Province - a village in Harmanli municipality, Haskovo Province
  - Slavyanovo, Targovishte Province - a village in Popovo municipality, Targovishte Province
