= Sadao =

Sadao may refer to:

== Places ==
- Sadao, Buachet - Buachet District - Surin Province, North-Eastern Thailand
- Sadao, Nang Rong - Nang Rong District - Buriram Province, North-Eastern Thailand
- Sadao, Phlapphla Chai - Phlapphla Chai District - Buriram Province, North-Eastern Thailand
- Sadao, Sadao - Sadao District - Songkhla Province, Southern Thailand
- Sadao, Tat Thong - Mueang Yasothon District - Yasothon Province North-Eastern Thailand
- Sadao district - on the border of Malaysia in Songkhla province, southern Thailand.

== Other uses ==
- Sadao (given name), a masculine Japanese given name
- Neem (in Thai: sadao; Khmer: sdao) a tree in the mahogany family Meliaceae
