= Sachihiko =

- Gender: Male

Origin
- Origin: Japanese
- Meaning: Different meanings depending on the kanji used

Sachihiko (written: 幸彦) is a masculine Japanese given name. Notable people with the name include:

- Soyama Sachihiko (曽山 幸彦; 1859–1892), Japanese painter
- Sachihiko Takeda (武田 幸彦; born 1937), Japanese sport wrestler
