= Ion Țăranu =

Romanian Greco-Roman wrestler

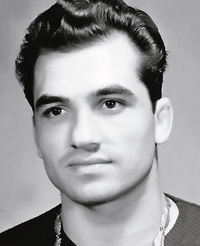
- Taranu in 1960

Personal information
- Born: 14 March 1938 (age 88) Turnu Măgurele, Romania
- Died: 2005 (aged 66–67)
- Height: 170 cm (5 ft 7 in)

Sport
- Sport: Greco-Roman wrestling
- Club: Dinamo Bucuresti
- Coached by: Dumitru Hatru
Medal record
Representing Romania
Olympic Games
Bronze medal – third place	1960 Rome	79 kg
European Championships
Silver medal – second place	1967 Minsk	78 kg

Ion Taranu (14 March 1938 – 2005) was a Greco-Roman wrestler from Romania. He competed at the 1960, 1964 and 1968 Olympics and won a bronze medal in 1960. He also won a silver medal at the 1967 European Championships Domestically, he collected 15 Romanian middleweight titles.

== Career ==
Taranu won his first national title in 1959, and next year qualified for the 1960 Olympics. His previous international experience consisted of two bouts against Hans Antonsson, both held in Bucharest. In Rome he unexpectedly defeated the Turkish world champion Kazim Ayvaz, but lost to Dimitar Dobrev and ended in a third place. Next year he placed fourth at the 1961 World Championships after losing to Vasily Zenin.

Taranu performed well at the 1964 Olympics, having no losses in his four matches, but he accumulated 6 penalty points in his draws against Matti Laakso and Anatoly Kolesov and ended in a fifth place. In 1967 he won a silver medal at the European championships, but placed only sixth at the world championships held in Bucharest, after losing to Viktor Igumenov.

Taranu retired from competitions after finishing fifth at the 1968 Summer Olympics. He then studied at the National Academy of Physical Education and Sport in Bucharest, defending a PhD in 1971 and eventually becoming a professor there. He also coached wrestlers at Progresul Bucharest and Dinamo Bucharest.
