= Clement of Vratsa =

Bulgarian Eastern Orthodox bishop (1873–1930)

His Eminence Clement
- Metropolitan of Vratsa
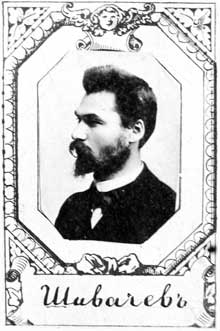
- Grigoriy Shivachev before his monasticism
- Church: Bulgarian Orthodox Church (Bulgarian Exarchate)
- See: Vratsa
- Installed: 9 March 1914
- Term ended: 3 May 1930
- Predecessor: Constantine (Malinkov)
- Successor: Paisius (Ankov)
- Other post: Vicar – Chairman of the Holy Synod of the Bulgarian Exarchate (1928–1930)
- Previous posts: Bishop of Branitsa (1909–1914)

Orders
- Consecration: 1909 by Auxentius (Goleminov)

Personal details
- Born: Grigoriy Ivanov Shivachev; 6 December 1873 Babek, Ottoman Bulgaria
- Died: 3 May 1930 (aged 56) Vratsa, Kingdom of Bulgaria
- Denomination: Eastern Orthodox Church
- Education: Kiev Theological Academy

Clement of Vratsa (Bulgarian: Климент Врачански; secular name: Grigoriy Ivanov Shivachev; Bulgarian: Григорий Иванов Шивачев; 6 December 1873 – 3 May 1930) was a Bulgarian Orthodox bishop.

== Biography ==
He received his theological education at the Samokov Theological Seminary and then at the Kiev Theological Academy. After returning to Bulgaria, he was particularly involved in the development of church education (theological schools and the Sofia University Faculty of Theology). From 1906 to 1909, he served as protosyngel at the Holy Synod of the Bulgarian Exarchate, and in 1909, thanks to the personal patronage of the Bulgarian Exarch Joseph I, he was ordained bishop of Branitsa, vicar of the Metropolitanate of Lovech.

He took over the cathedra of the Eparchy of Vratsa in 1914 after the death of Metropolitan Constantine, who died in 1912. In the years following World War I, he worked to support Bulgarian prisoners of war, enabling their return to the country, and providing material assistance locally. He also contributed to the normalization of relations between the Bulgarian state and the Bulgarian Orthodox Church. He built a new metropolitan residence in Vratsa, organized theological courses at the Cherepish Monastery, and established a fund for the material support of the clergy.

From 1914 to 1930, he served on the Holy Synod of the Bulgarian Exarchate, and was its chairman from 1928 to 1930. He sought to build good relations between the Bulgarian Orthodox Church and other local Orthodox Churches, particularly the Russian, Serbian, and Romanian Churches. He held the office of Metropolitan of Vratsa until his death.

He is author of a collection of homilies and a handbook of homiletics, published in 1908.
