= Haddaoui =

Haddaoui is an Arabic surname. Notable people with the surname include:

== Surname ==
- Anissa Haddaoui (born 1991), Dutch-Moroccan boxer, kickboxer, muay thai fighter and BJJ practitioner
- Fethi Haddaoui (1961–2024), Tunisian actor, writer, director, and producer
- Mouncif El Haddaoui (1964–2024), Moroccan footballer
- Mustafa El Haddaoui (born 1961), Moroccan footballer
- Riffi Haddaoui (born 1971), Danish footballer

== Middle name ==
- Hammou Haddaoui Khadir (born 1936), Moroccan wrestler
