= Bogomil (disambiguation) =

A bogomil is an adherent of bogimilism, a Bulgarian dualist sect.

Bogimil may also refer to:

- Bogomil (priest), a 10th-century Bulgarian priest
- Bogomil (name), a Bulgarian name
- Bogomil (village), a village in Bulgaria
- Bogomil Cove
