= Charles Berthoud =

Swiss wrestler

Personal information
- Nationality: Swiss
- Born: 28 September 1938 (age 87) Châtel-Saint-Denis, Switzerland

Sport
- Sport: Wrestling

Charles Berthoud (born 28 September 1938) is a Swiss former wrestler. He competed in the men's Greco-Roman middleweight at the 1960 Summer Olympics.
