= Ovcharovo, Haskovo Province =

Ovcharovo
- Village
- Location in Bulgaria
- Coordinates: 42.012°N 26.002°E
- Country: Bulgaria
- Province: Haskovo Province
- Municipality: Harmanli
- Time zone: UTC+2 (EET)
  - Summer (DST): UTC+3 (EEST)

Ovcharovo is a village in the municipality of Harmanli, in Haskovo Province, in southern Bulgaria.
