= Günther Maritschnigg =

German wrestler (1933–2013)

Medal record

Men's Greco-Roman wrestling

Representing Germany

Olympic Games
Silver medal – second place	1960 Rome	Welterweight

Günther Maritschnigg (7 November 1933 – 22 January 2013) was a German former wrestler who competed in the 1960 Summer Olympics. He was born in Bochum.
