= Ivanovo, Haskovo Province =

Ivanovo
- Village
- Location in Bulgaria
- Coordinates: 41.854°N 25.879°E
- Country: Bulgaria
- Province: Haskovo Province
- Municipality: Harmanli
- Time zone: UTC+2 (EET)
  - Summer (DST): UTC+3 (EEST)

Ivanovo is a village in the municipality of Harmanli, in Haskovo Province, in southern Bulgaria.
