= Leshnikovo =

- Village
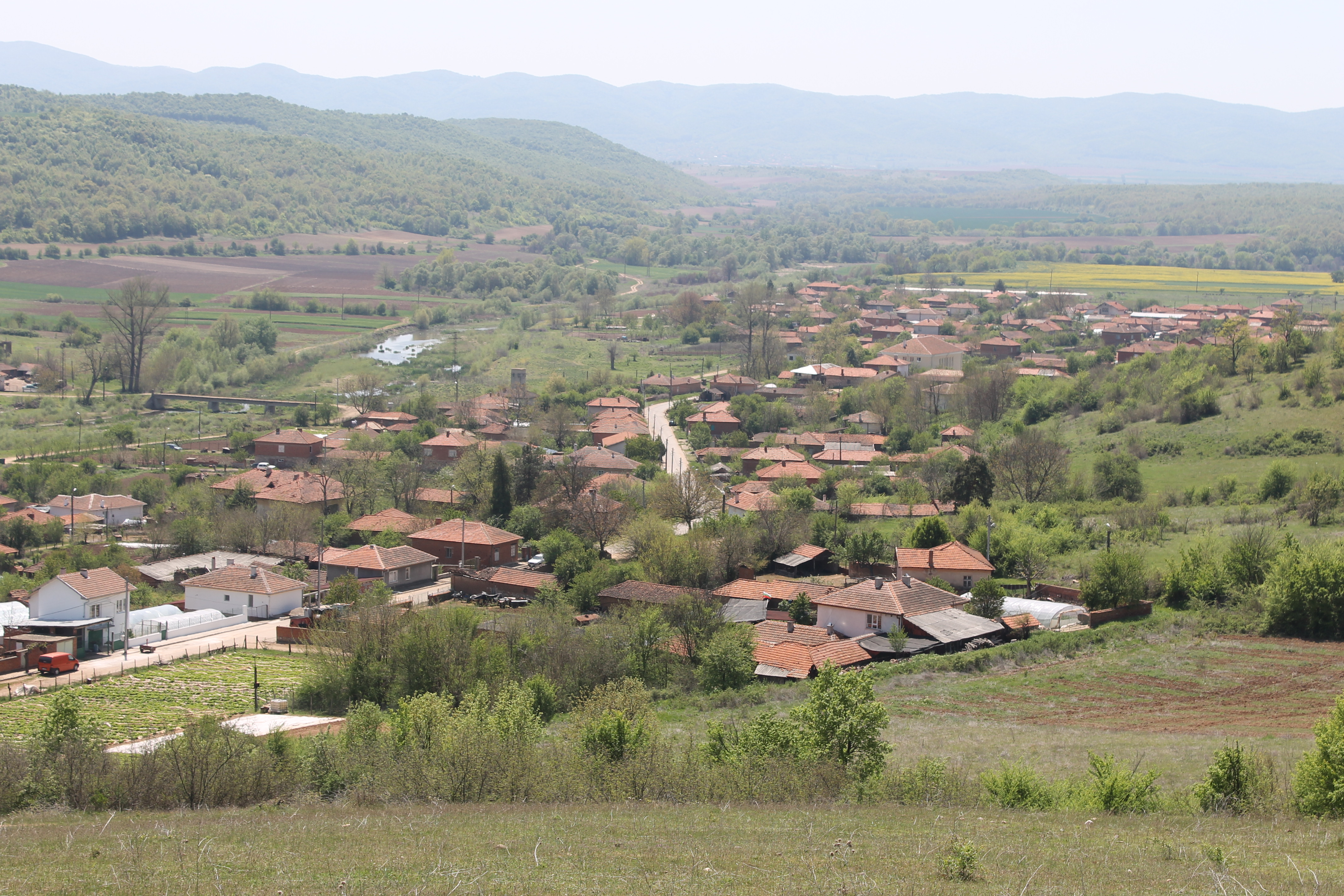
- Leshnikovo (Hazelnut) village Bulgaria

- Location within Bulgaria
- Coordinates: 41°51′N 25°55′E
- Country: Bulgaria
- Province: Haskovo Province
- Municipality: Harmanli
- Time zone: UTC+2 (EET)
  - Summer (DST): UTC+3 (EEST)

Leshnikovo is a village in the municipality of Harmanli, in Haskovo Province, in southeastern Bulgaria. The village is surrounded by mountains and fields in the other direction. Leshnikovo is about 30 kilometers from the Greek border, as well as from the Turkish border.

The village has less than a hundred houses, many of which are uninhabited. There are two bars in the village and a renovated village house to take care of the villagers. The building also has room for events, a library and a hall with benches for watching movies.
