= Varbovo, Haskovo Province =

Varbovo
- Village
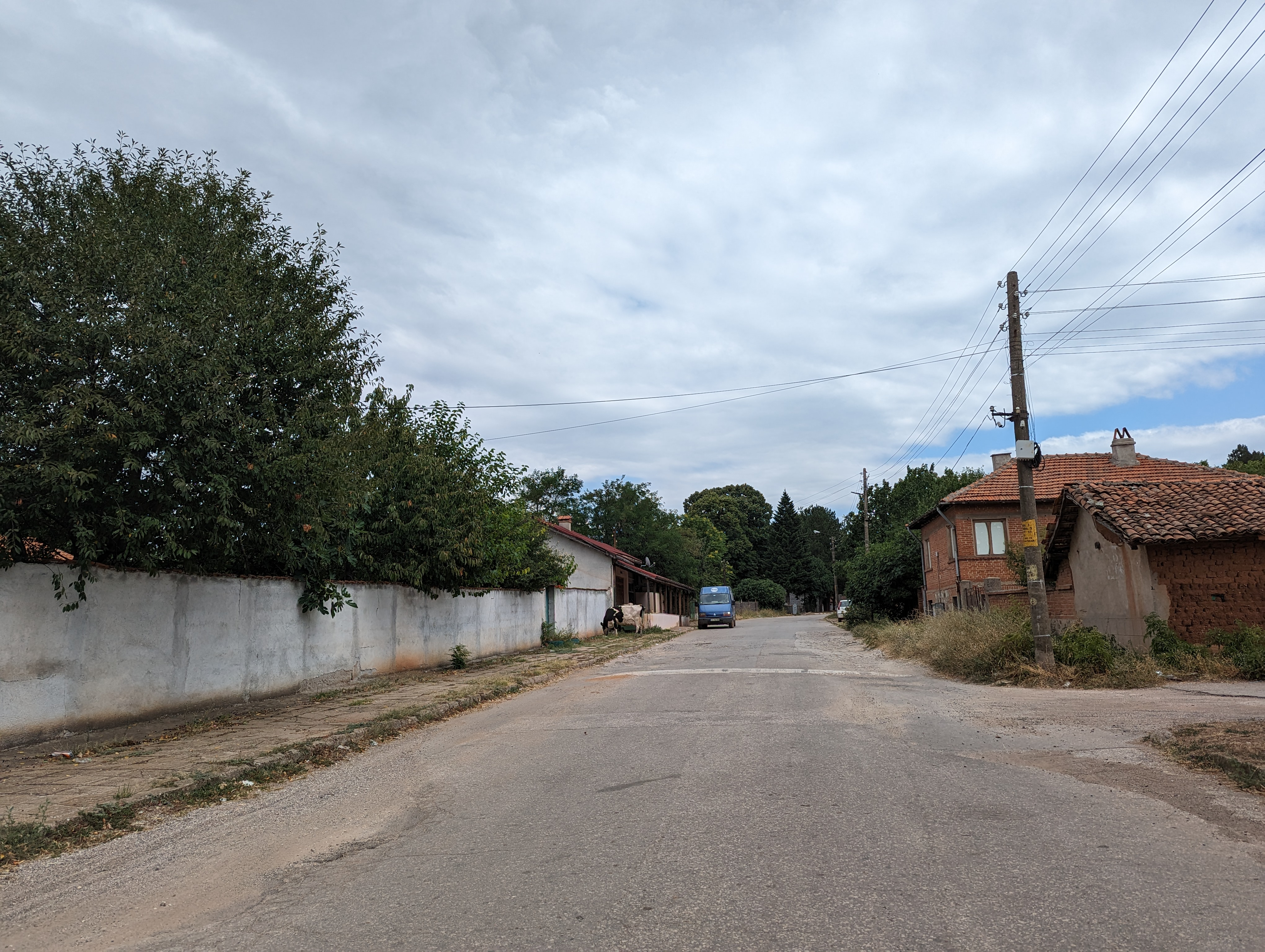
- A road in Varbovo

- Location in Bulgaria
- Coordinates: 41°45′45″N 25°51′30″E
- Country: Bulgaria
- Province: Haskovo Province
- Municipality: Harmanli
- Time zone: UTC+2 (EET)
  - Summer (DST): UTC+3 (EEST)

Varbovo is a village in the municipality of Harmanli, in Haskovo Province, in southern Bulgaria.
