= Karel Oomen =

Belgian wrestler (1932–2022)

Personal information
- Nationality: Belgian
- Born: 16 December 1932 Antwerp, Belgium
- Died: 25 November 2022 (aged 89) Schoten, Belgium

Sport
- Sport: Wrestling

Karel Oomen (16 December 1932 – 25 November 2022) was a Belgian wrestler. He competed in the men's Greco-Roman welterweight at the 1960 Summer Olympics.

Oomen died in Schoten on 25 November 2022, at the age of 89.
