= Fritz Fivian =

American wrestler

Personal information
- Born: January 15, 1930 Thun, Switzerland
- Died: April 2, 2009 (aged 79) Milwaukie, Oregon, U.S.

Sport
- Country: United States
- Sport: Wrestling
- Events: Greco-Roman and Folkstyle
- College team: Oregon State
- Team: USA

Fritz Fivian (January 15, 1930 – April 2, 2009) was an American wrestler. He competed in the men's Greco-Roman welterweight at the 1960 Summer Olympics.
