= Ángel Cuetos =

Spanish wrestler

Personal information
- Nationality: Spanish
- Born: 1 August 1936 Meruelo, Spain
- Died: 10 June 2016 (aged 79) Bilbao

Sport
- Sport: Wrestling

Ángel Cuetos (1 August 1936 – 10 June 2016) was a Spanish wrestler. He competed in the men's Greco-Roman welterweight at the 1960 Summer Olympics.
