= Leopold Israelsson =

Swedish wrestler

Personal information
- Nationality: Swedish
- Born: 18 October 1934 Lycksele, Sweden
- Died: 15 October 1971 (aged 36) Lycksele, Sweden

Sport
- Sport: Wrestling

Leopold Israelsson (18 October 1934 – 15 October 1971) was a Swedish wrestler. He competed in the men's Greco-Roman middleweight at the 1960 Summer Olympics.
