= Yacoub Romanos =

Lebanese wrestler

Personal information
- Nationality: Lebanese
- Born: 17 May 1935 Batroun, Lebanon
- Died: 24 August 2011 (aged 76)

Sport
- Sport: Wrestling

Yacoub Romanos (17 May 1935 – 24 August 2011) was a Lebanese wrestler. He competed in the men's Greco-Roman middleweight at the 1960 Summer Olympics.
