= Noboru Aomi =

Japanese wrestler

Personal information
- Nationality: Japanese
- Born: 5 December 1938 (age 87) Niigata, Japan

Sport
- Sport: Wrestling

Noboru Aomi (born 5 December 1938) is a Japanese former wrestler. He competed in the men's Greco-Roman middleweight at the 1960 Summer Olympics.
