= Asghar Zoghian =

Iranian wrestler

Personal information
- Nationality: Iranian
- Born: 7 November 1929
- Died: 14 March 2005 (aged 75) Qom, Iran

Sport
- Sport: Wrestling

'Asghar Zoghian (Persian: اصغر ذوقیان, 7 November 1929 – 14 March 2005) was an Iranian wrestler. He competed in the men's Greco-Roman welterweight at the 1964 Summer Olympics.
