= Nikolay Chuchalov =

Soviet wrestler

Personal information
- Nationality: Soviet
- Born: 13 August 1933 Chuchalovo, Verkhoshizhemsky District, Russian SFSR, Soviet Union
- Died: 5 May 2011 (aged 78)

Sport
- Sport: Wrestling

Nikolay Chuchalov (13 August 1933 – 5 May 2011) was a Soviet wrestler. He competed in the men's Greco-Roman middleweight at the 1960 Summer Olympics.
