= Bernard Philippe =

Luxembourgish wrestler

Personal information
- Nationality: Luxembourgish
- Born: 4 October 1936 (age 89) Luxembourg City, Luxembourg

Sport
- Sport: Wrestling

Bernard Philippe (born 4 October 1936) is a Luxembourgish wrestler. He competed in the men's Greco-Roman welterweight at the 1960 Summer Olympics.
