= Rogozinovo =

- Village
- Location within Bulgaria
- Coordinates: 41°55′N 25°58′E
- Country: Bulgaria
- Province: Haskovo Province
- Municipality: Harmanli
- Time zone: UTC+2 (EET)
  - Summer (DST): UTC+3 (EEST)

Rogozinovo is a village in the municipality of Harmanli, in Haskovo Province, in southern Bulgaria.
