= Luís Caldas =

Portuguese wrestler (1926–2012)

Personal information
- Nationality: Portuguese
- Born: 17 December 1926 Lisbon, Portugal
- Died: 30 June 2012 (aged 85) Lisbon, Portugal

Sport
- Sport: Wrestling

Luís Caldas (17 December 1926 – 30 June 2012) was a Portuguese wrestler. He competed in the men's Greco-Roman middleweight at the 1960 Summer Olympics.
