= Sam Azoulay =

Moroccan wrestler

Personal information
- Nationality: Moroccan
- Born: 1936 (age 89–90) Casablanca, Morocco

Sport
- Sport: Wrestling

Sam Azoulay (born 1936) is a Moroccan wrestler. He competed in the men's Greco-Roman welterweight at the 1960 Summer Olympics.
