= Bjarne Ansbøl =

Danish wrestler (born 1937)

Personal information
- Nationality: Danish
- Born: 3 July 1937 (age 89) Copenhagen, Denmark

Sport
- Sport: Wrestling

Bjarne Ansbøl (born 3 July 1937) is a Danish wrestler. He competed in the men's Greco-Roman welterweight at the 1960 Summer Olympics.
