= Hicham Ido =

Lebanese wrestler

Personal information
- Nationality: Lebanese
- Born: 21 March 1933 (age 93) Beirut, Lebanon

Sport
- Sport: Wrestling

Hicham Ido (born 21 March 1933) is a Lebanese wrestler. He competed in the men's Greco-Roman welterweight at the 1960 Summer Olympics.
