= Mansour Hazrati =

Iranian wrestler

Personal information
- Full name: Mansour Khoddam Hazrati
- Nationality: Iranian
- Born: 14 April 1932 (age 94) Tehran, Iran

Sport
- Sport: Wrestling

Mansour Khoddam Hazrati (Persian: منصور خدام حضرتی; born 14 April 1932) is an Iranian wrestler. He competed in the men's Greco-Roman middleweight at the 1960 Summer Olympics.
