= Ab Rosbag =

Dutch wrestler

Personal information
- Nationality: Dutch
- Born: 14 March 1940 (age 86) Utrecht, Netherlands

Sport
- Sport: Wrestling

Ab Rosbag (born 14 March 1940) is a Dutch wrestler. He competed in the men's Greco-Roman welterweight at the 1960 Summer Olympics.
