= André Lamy (wrestler) =

French wrestler (1932–2025)

Personal information
- Nationality: French
- Born: 29 August 1932 Lempdes, France
- Died: February 13, 2025 (aged 92) Lempdes, France

Sport
- Sport: Wrestling

André Lamy (29 August 1932 – 13 February 2025) was a French wrestler. A Greco-Roman champion at the French Senior Wrestling Championships, he competed in the men's Greco-Roman middleweight event at the 1960 Summer Olympics.

Lamy died on 13 February 2025 in Lempdes, at the age of 92.
