= Sin Dong-ui =

South Korean wrestler

Personal information
- Nationality: South Korean
- Born: 28 March 1941 (age 85)

Sport
- Sport: Wrestling

Sin Dong-ui (born 28 March 1941) is a South Korean wrestler. He competed in the men's Greco-Roman welterweight at the 1964 Summer Olympics.
