= Dositeevo =

- Village
- Location within Bulgaria
- Coordinates: 41°55′N 26°01′E
- Country: Bulgaria
- Province: Haskovo Province
- Municipality: Harmanli
- Time zone: UTC+2 (EET)
  - Summer (DST): UTC+3 (EEST)

Dositeevo is a village in the municipality of Harmanli, in Haskovo Province, in southern Bulgaria. During the Ottoman rule of present-day Bulgaria, the name of the village was Suluköy. The village became part of the Principality of Bulgaria in 1885.

== Geography ==
The village is situated in the far southwestern parts of the Sakar mountains in the Maritsa river valley. The climate is characterized by dry and hot summers, and mild winters. The main economic fields in the village are animal husbandry and agriculture. Current crops are tomatoes, cucumbers, watermelons, melons, and wheat. The mild winters favor the growth of figs, pomegranate, sesame, etc. There is a long-established enological tradition in the area, utilizing grape varietals such as Merlot and Cabernet Sauvignon. The proximity of the Maritsa river and the village dam presents good fishing tourism conditions.

== History ==
According to folk history, the village has changed location three times. The first location is where the current Dositeevo dam is situated. The old Ottoman postal road had passed through that setup of the village and the residents were chased away due to a robbery on a money wagon. The second village had been in the area called Urteto (Bulgarian Юртето), where the current cemetery is located. The earliest grave in it is from 1877. The residents moved to the current village location shortly thereafter, beginning with the Chukalci family (Bulgarian Чукалците).

The current village name comes from archimandrite Dositei, who had contributed to the mid-19th century Bulgarian struggle for church independence from the Ottomans and from Greek ecclesiastical influence. Wounded by the Ottomans, Dositei took refuge in the village but died. He is buried at the Rila Monastery.

Nearby is the Roman fortified mansio Castra Rubra, which flanks the ancient Roman Road leading to Constantinople (Via Militaris a.k.a. Via Diagonalis). The mansio had served as a rest station for the Roman couriers, who could get fresh horses there, as well as for other travelers on this major road. There are ruins of Thracian and Byzantine origin in the area. One of the most interesting natural formations in the vicinity is the Thracian ritual site Hasarcheto (Bulg. Хасарчето), a.k.a. Koncheto (Bulg. Кончето). This is a rock formation hanging over the Balachka (Bulg. Балъчка)river connected with the heights northwest of the village. Studies by archeologist B. Borislavov indicate the ritual site has been in use since at least the early Iron Age but may have even been utilized in the Bronze Age. The specifics of this and similar cult sites in the vicinity suggest advanced and active cultural life in the area.

According to tradition, two voivodes were based in Dositeevo - Stanko and Stratia, father and son. With their bravery, they instilled fear among the Ottoman Turks, who did not even dare to stop by the village. The companies of Stanko and Stratia attacked the Sultan's mail carriers, traveling from Constantinople to Ruse and back. Once this happened at Halitova koria near today's village of Georgi Dobrevo. The bandits killed the guards and took all the money and valuables. Legend has it that they used the money to cast musket balls, and gave the remainder to the poor villagers.

Stanko hid in a cave, which was later named after him. Surrounded by Ottoman troops he threw himself off the cliff so he wouldn't be captured alive.

His son Stratia was known as "the winged outlaw" and his comrades called him the Bear. A special Sultan's firman was issued for him, ordering his capture and impalement. Indeed, Ottoman forces set out to find him and he was killed in the area Mechkin Dol near the village. The body of the brave outlaw was dismembered and scattered, and his head was impaled and placed near the village to deter further brigand activity. This place is still called Stratieva Vruzka (Stratia's Connection). In order to save themselves from the Ottomans' revenge following Stratia's death, his wife Dobra and his surviving sons fled to Svilengrad. Their descendants - the Razboinikov family, took an active part in the church's struggle for independence, in the fight against the Turks, and later in the Ilinden-Preobrazhenie uprising.

== Notable people ==
- Kiril Petkov (1933–2019), Bulgarian wrestler
