= Marziano Magnani =

Italian wrestler

Personal information
- Nationality: Italian
- Born: 14 June 1936 Bologna, Italy
- Died: 11 November 1983 (aged 47)

Sport
- Sport: Wrestling

Marziano Magnani (14 June 1936 – 11 November 1983) was an Italian wrestler. He competed in the men's Greco-Roman middleweight at the 1960 Summer Olympics. Magnani was also a four-time national champion in the 1960s and 1970s.
