= Sadao (given name) =

- Gender: Male

Origin
- Origin: Japanese
- Meaning: Different meanings depending on the kanji used

Sadao (written: 貞雄, 貞夫, 禎雄 or サダオ in katakana) is a masculine Japanese given name. Notable people with the name include:

- Sadao Abe (阿部 サダヲ; born 1970), Japanese actor and musician
- Sadao Araki (荒木 貞夫; 1877–1966), Imperial Japanese Army general, politician, and political philosopher
- Sadao Bekku (別宮 貞雄; 1922–2012), Japanese classical composer
- Sadao Fuchigami (渕上 貞雄; 1937–2023), Japanese politician
- Sadao Hasegawa (長谷川 サダオ; 1945–1999), Japanese gay erotic artist
- Sadao Kazama (風間 貞夫; born 1940), Japanese sport wrestler
- Kotogahama Sadao (琴ヶ濵 貞雄; 1927–1981), Japanese sumo wrestler
- Sadao Munemori (旨森 貞雄; 1922–1945), United States Army soldier and Medal of Honor recipient
- Sadao Nakajima (中島 貞夫; 1934–2023), Japanese film director and screenwriter
- Sadao Sato (佐藤 貞雄; 1949–2003), Japanese sport wrestler
- Sadao Sei (清 貞雄), Japanese astronomer
- Sadao Takagi (高木 貞夫; born 1932), Japanese entomologist
- Wakabayama Sadao (若葉山 貞雄; 1922–2001), Japanese sumo wrestler
- Sadao Watanabe (artist) (渡辺 禎雄; 1913–1996), Japanese printmaker
- Sadao Watanabe (musician) (渡辺 貞夫; born 1933), Japanese jazz musician
- Sadao Yamahana (山花 貞夫; 1936–1999), Japanese politician
- Sadao Yamanaka (山中 貞雄; 1909–1938), Japanese film director and screenwriter
