= Hans-Jörg Hirschbühl =

Swiss wrestler

Personal information
- Nationality: Swiss
- Born: 21 May 1937 (age 89) Zürich, Switzerland

Sport
- Sport: Wrestling

Hans-Jörg Hirschbühl (born 21 May 1937) is a Swiss wrestler. He competed in the men's Greco-Roman welterweight at the 1960 Summer Olympics.
