= Shishmanovo, Haskovo Province =

Shishmanovo
- Village
- Location in Bulgaria
- Coordinates: 41°58′59″N 25°55′37″E
- Country: Bulgaria
- Province: Haskovo Province
- Municipality: Harmanli
- Time zone: UTC+2 (EET)
  - Summer (DST): UTC+3 (EEST)

Shishmanovo is a village in the municipality of Harmanli, in Haskovo Province, in southern Bulgaria.
