= Edward Żuławnik =

Polish wrestler (1932–1999)

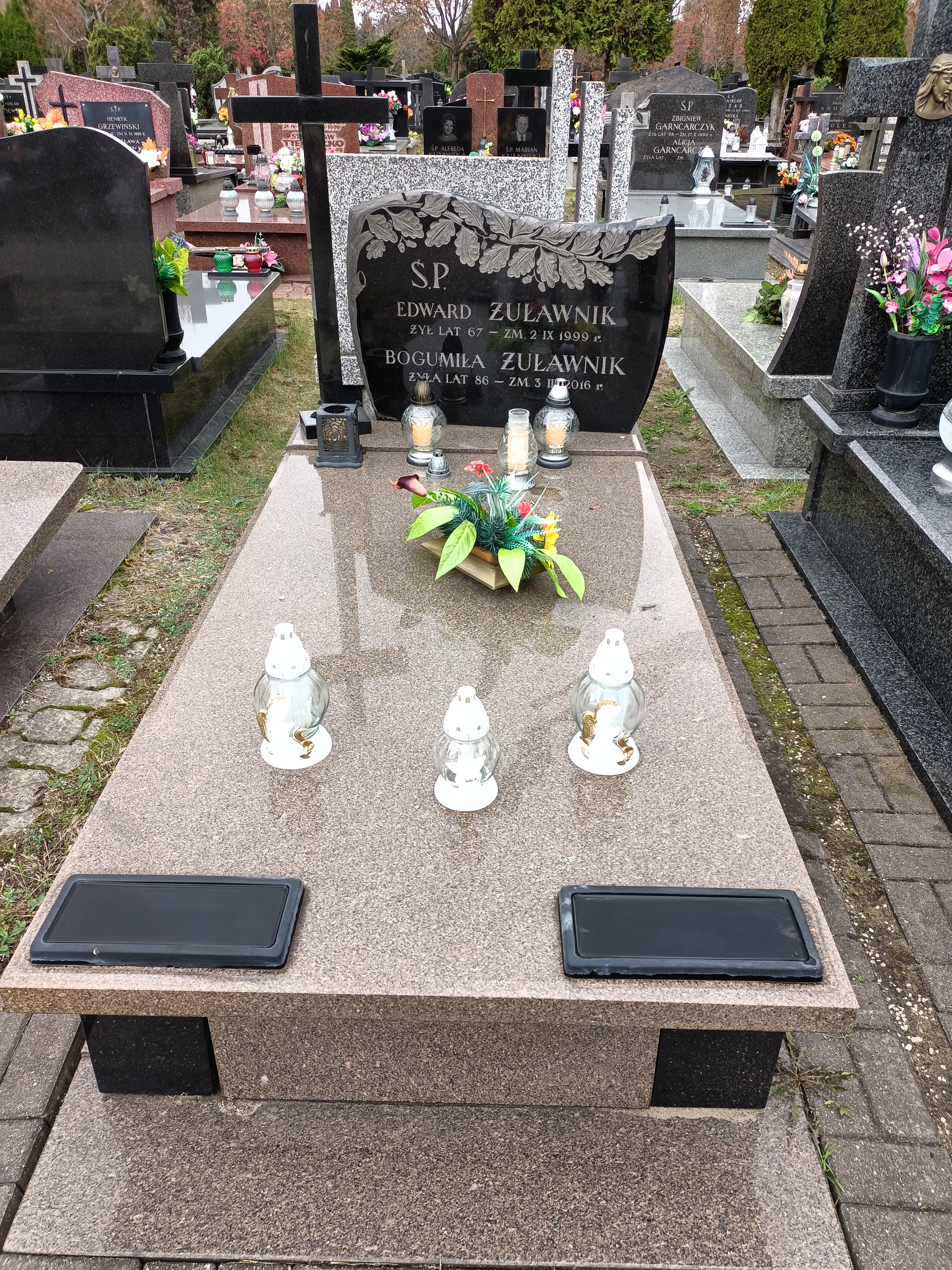
- Żuławnik's grave

Personal information
- Nationality: Polish
- Born: 23 November 1932 Wychódźc, Poland
- Died: 1 September 1999 (aged 66) Warsaw, Poland

Sport
- Sport: Wrestling

Edward Żuławnik (23 November 1932 – 1 September 1999) was a Polish wrestler. He competed in the men's Greco-Roman welterweight at the 1960 Summer Olympics.
