= Cherepovo =

- Village
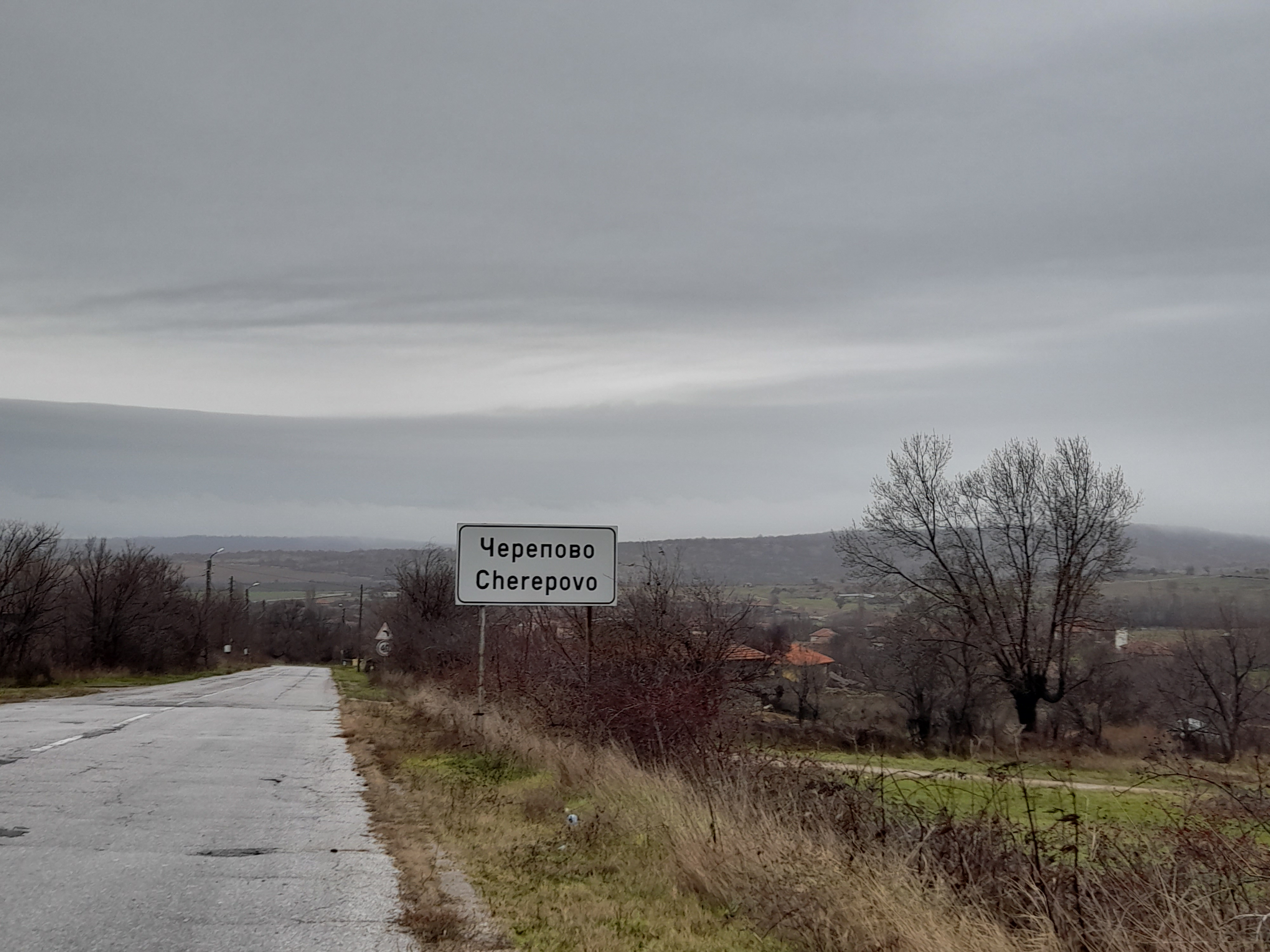

- Location within Bulgaria
- Coordinates: 42°01′N 26°08′E
- Country: Bulgaria
- Province: Haskovo Province
- Municipality: Harmanli
- Time zone: UTC+2 (EET)
  - Summer (DST): UTC+3 (EEST)

Cherepovo is a village in the municipality of Harmanli, in Haskovo Province, in southern Bulgaria.
