= Pentti Punkari =

Finnish wrestler

Personal information
- Nationality: Finnish
- Born: 12 January 1938 (age 88) Ylistaro, Finland

Sport
- Sport: Wrestling

Pentti Punkari (born 12 January 1938) is a Finnish wrestler. He competed at the 1960 Summer Olympics and the 1964 Summer Olympics.
