= René Schiermeyer =

French wrestler

Medal record

Men's Greco-Roman wrestling

Representing France

Olympic Games
Bronze medal – third place	1960 Rome	Welterweight

René Schiermeyer (born 27 September 1938 in Mulhouse) is a French former wrestler who competed in the 1960 Summer Olympics and in the 1964 Summer Olympics.
