= Job Mayo =

Filipino wrestler

Personal information
- Nationality: Filipino
- Born: 19 October 1941
- Died: 29 August 2000 (aged 58)

Sport
- Sport: Wrestling

Job Mayo (19 October 1941 – 29 August 2000) was a Filipino wrestler. He competed in two events at the 1964 Summer Olympics.
