= Sadao Kazama =

Japanese Greco-Roman wrestler

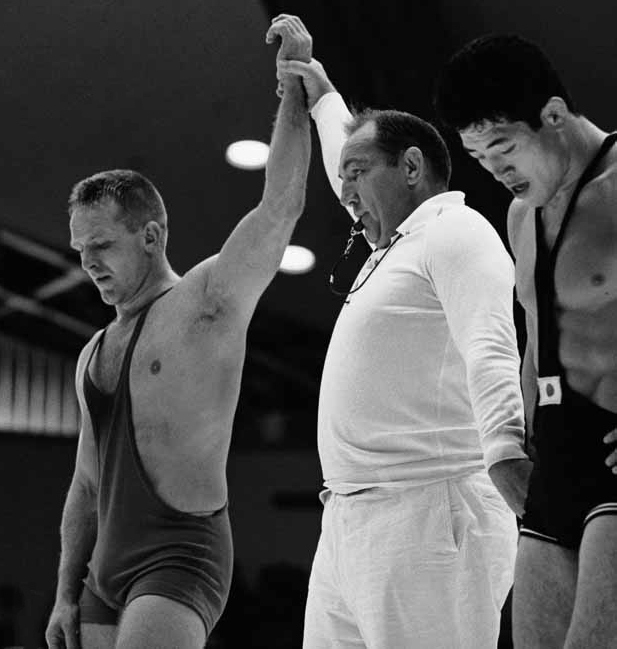
- Bertil Nyström vs. Sadao Kazama (right) at the 1964 Olympics

Personal information
- Born: 25 October 1940 (age 85)
- Height: 174 cm (5 ft 9 in)
- Weight: 80 kg (176 lb)

Sport
- Sport: Greco-Roman wrestling

Sadao Kazama (風間 貞夫, Kazama Sadao; born 25 October 1940) is a retired welterweight Greco-Roman wrestler from Japan. He competed at the 1964 Summer Olympics in Tokyo, but was eliminated by Bertil Nyström in the third round.
