= Anatoly Kolesov =

Soviet wrestler and coach

Personal information
- Born: Anatoly Ivanovich Kolesov; 18 January 1938 Osakarov District, Karaganda Region, Kazakh SSR, Soviet Union
- Died: 2 January 2012 (aged 73) Moscow, Russia
- Height: 174 cm (5 ft 9 in)

Sport
- Sport: Greco-Roman wrestling
- Club: CSKA Moscow
- Coached by: Aleksandr Mazur
Medal record
Men's Greco-Roman wrestling
Representing the Soviet Union
Olympic Games
Gold medal – first place	1964 Tokyo	78 kg
World Championships
Gold medal – first place	1962 Toledo	78 kg
Gold medal – first place	1963 Helsingborg	78 kg
Gold medal – first place	1965 Tampere	78 kg

Anatoly Ivanovich Kolesov (Russian: Анатолий Иванович Колесов, 18 January 1938 – 2 January 2012) was a Soviet Greco-Roman wrestler and coach. He won the world welterweight title in 1962, 1963 and 1965 and an Olympic gold medal in 1964.

Kolesov won only two Soviet titles, in 1959 and 1964. He retired in 1965, and in 1966–69 was the head coach of the Soviet national wrestling team. From 1969 to 1992 he served as deputy chairman of the Committee for Physical Culture and Sport with the Council of Soviet Ministers. He headed the Soviet Wrestling Federation in 1991, and the Soviet and then Russian wrestling teams at the 1972–2004 Olympics.
