= Sachihiko Takeda =

Japanese wrestler

Personal information
- Nationality: Japanese
- Born: 12 April 1937 (age 89) Hokkaido, Japan

Sport
- Sport: Wrestling

Sachihiko Takeda (武田 幸彦, Takeda Sachihiko; born 12 April 1937) is a Japanese wrestler. He competed in the men's Greco-Roman welterweight at the 1960 Summer Olympics.
