= Kiril Petkov (wrestler) =

Bulgarian wrestler (1933–2019)

Kiril Petkov Кирил Тодоров Петков

Personal information
- Native name: Кирил Тодоров Петков
- Full name: Kiril Todorov Petkov
- Nationality: Bulgarian
- Born: June 8, 1933 Dositeevo, Haskovo Province, Bulgaria
- Died: January 22, 2019 (aged 85) Sofia, Sofia City Province, Bulgaria

Sport
- Sport: Wrestling
Medal record
Men's Greco-Roman wrestling
Representing Bulgaria
Olympic Games
| Silver medal – second place | 1964 Tokyo | Welterweight |

Kiril Todorov Petkov (Bulgarian: Кирил Тодоров Петков) (8 June 1933 – 22 January 2019) was a Bulgarian wrestler. He completed his military service at CSKA and graduated from the NSA. He competed in the 1960 Summer Olympics in Rome and in the 1964 Summer Olympics in Tokyo in which he won a silver medal. He died on 22 January 2019 and was made an honorary citizen of Pernik.
