= Raymond Schummer =

Luxembourgish wrestler (1937–2009)

Personal information
- Nationality: Luxembourgish
- Born: 31 March 1937; Luxembourg, Luxembourg
- Died: 10 October 2009 (aged 72); Bettembourg, Luxembourg

Sport
- Sport: Wrestling

Raymond Schummer (31 March 1937 – 10 October 2009) was a Luxembourgish wrestler. He competed at the 1960 Summer Olympics and the 1964 Summer Olympics.
