= Grigory Gamarnik =

Ukrainian wrestler

- Григорий Гамарник
- Born: Grigory Aleksandrovich Gamarnik; April 22, 1929; Zinovievsk, Ukrainian SSR, Soviet Union
- Died: April 18, 2018 (aged 88); Brooklyn, United States
- Citizenship: USSR
- Occupation: Wrestler
- Known for: World champion in 67 kg. Greco-Roman wrestling (1955)
- Height: 5 ft 7 in (171 cm)

Medal record

Men's Greco-Roman wrestling

Representing Soviet Union

World Championships
Gold medal – first place	1955 Karlsruhe	Lightweight
Silver medal – second place	1958 Budapest	Welterweight

USSR Championships
Gold medal – first place	1953	
Gold medal – first place	1956	
Gold medal – first place	1957	
Gold medal – first place	1958	

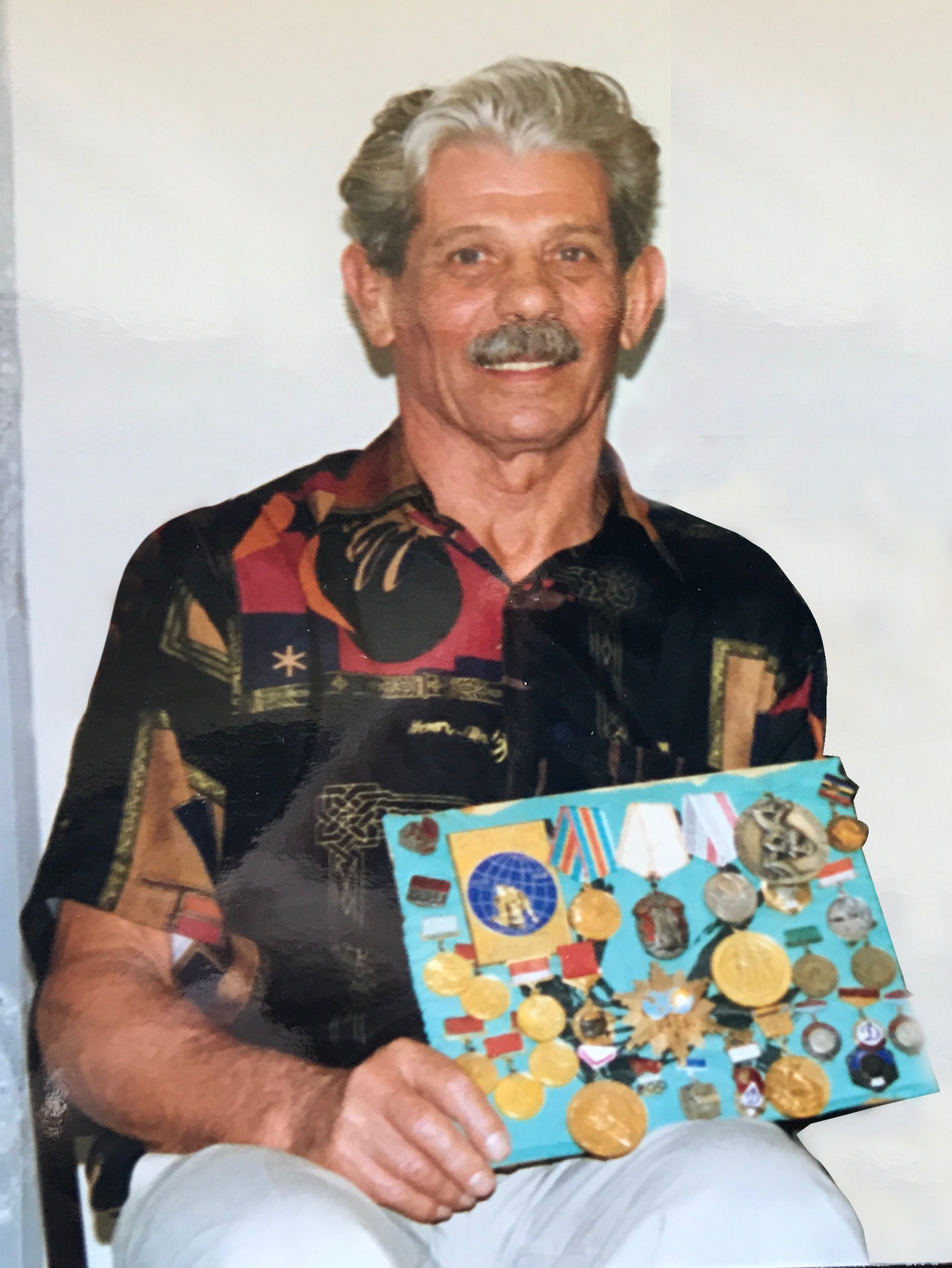
Grigory Gamarnik in later years

Grigory Aleksandrovich Gamarnik (Russian: Григорий Александрович Гамарник; Ukrainian: Григорій Олександрович Гамарник, romanized: Hryhorii Oleksandrovych Hamarnyk; April 22, 1929 – April 18, 2018) was a world champion wrestler and the first Greco-Roman wrestling world champion from Ukraine.

== Biography ==
Gamarnik was Jewish, and was born in Zinovievsk (today's Kropyvnytskyi), Ukraine, in the Soviet Union. He was trained by USSR wrestling trainers German Sandler and Armenak Yaltyryan.

=== Wrestling career ===
In 1948, he won second place in light middleweight class wrestling, at the All-Union Youth Contests in the USSR.

Gamarnik was world lightweight (67 kg) Greco-Roman wrestling champion at the 1955 World Wrestling Championships in Karlsruhe, Germany, beating out silver medalist Kyösti Lehtonen of Finland and bronze medalist Gustav Freij of Sweden. He came in second in the 1958 World Wrestling Championships in Budapest, Hungary, in welterweight (73 kg) Greco-Roman wrestling, behind gold medalist Kazim Ayvaz of Turkey and ahead of bronze medalist Valeriu Bularca of Romania.

He came in fifth in the 1960 Summer Olympics in Rome, Italy, in men's welterweight Greco-Roman wrestling. Gamarnik was also a USSR wrestling champion in 1953, and in 1956–58.

== Retirement ==
After retiring from competitions, Gamarnik was the Ukrainian National Coach from 1970 to 1991. He also served as a President of Greco-Roman Federation, was a FILA International referee since 1979, officiated at the Moscow Olympic Games (1980), and was one of the organizers of the FILA World Cup in 1983 in Kiev, Ukraine. For his many years of commitment, Grigory Gamarnik was awarded the FILA Gold Star (1983) by then president Milan Ercegan.

Grigory Gamarnik was inducted into the International Jewish Sports Hall of Fame in 2020.

== See also ==
- List of select Jewish wrestlers
