= Ronald Hunt (wrestler) =

Australian wrestler

Personal information
- Nationality: Australian
- Born: 5 April 1929 Albury, New South Wales, Australia
- Died: 29 October 2016 (aged 87)

Sport
- Sport: Wrestling

Ronald Hunt (5 April 1929 – 29 October 2016) was an Australian wrestler. He competed in two events at the 1960 Summer Olympics.
