= Hammou Haddaoui Khadir =

Moroccan wrestler

Personal information
- Nationality: Moroccan
- Born: 1 September 1936 (age 90) Ouled Hariz, Morocco

Sport
- Sport: Wrestling

Hammou Haddaoui Khadir (born 1 September 1936) is a Moroccan wrestler. He competed in the men's Greco-Roman middleweight at the 1960 Summer Olympics.
