= Robert Clark (wrestler) =

Australian wrestler

Personal information
- Nationality: Australian
- Born: 27 December 1939 Melbourne, Australia
- Died: 21 May 2013 (aged 73)

Sport
- Sport: Wrestling

Robert Thomas Stanley Clark (27 December 1939 – 21 May 2013) was an Australian wrestler. He competed in two events at the 1960 Summer Olympics.
