= Oddvar Barlie =

Norwegian sport wrestler

- Born: 24 June 1929; Oslo, Norway
- Died: 10 January 2017 (aged 87)
- Occupation: Wrestler
- Relatives: Harald Barlie (brother); Ine Barlie (niece); Mette Barlie (niece); Lene Barlie (grandniece)

Oddvar Barlie (24 June 1929 – 10 January 2017) was a Norwegian sport wrestler. He was born in Oslo and represented the club Oslo Bryteklubb. He competed at the 1960 Summer Olympics in Rome, where he placed tied tenth in Greco-Roman wrestling, the middleweight class. He was a brother of wrestler Harald Barlie. He was an uncle of Ine Barlie and Mette Barlie and granduncle of Lene Barlie, all wrestlers.
