= Franz Berger (wrestler) =

Austrian wrestler

Franz Berger (24 January 1940 – 8 January 2012) was an Austrian wrestler who competed in the 1960 Summer Olympics, in the 1964 Summer Olympics, in the 1968 Summer Olympics, and in the 1972 Summer Olympics.
