= Russell Camilleri =

American wrestler (1936–2023)

Personal information
- Full name: Russell Anthony Camilleri
- Born: November 13, 1936 New York, New York, U.S.
- Died: November 5, 2023 (aged 86) Osage Beach, Missouri, U.S.

Sport
- Country: United States
- Sport: Wrestling
- Event: Greco-Roman
- College team: San Jose State
- Club: Olympic Club – San Francisco
- Team: USA

Russell Camilleri (November 13, 1936 – November 5, 2023) was an American wrestler. He competed at the 1960 Summer Olympics and the 1964 Summer Olympics in Greco-Roman wrestling. Camilleri died in Osage Beach, Missouri, on November 5, 2023, at the age of 86.
