= Albert Michiels (wrestler) =

Belgian wrestler 1931–1998

Personal information
- Nationality: Belgian
- Born: 29 June 1931; Antwerp, Belgium
- Died: 29 August 1998 (aged 67); Antwerp, Belgium

Sport
- Sport: Wrestling

Albert Michiels (29 June 1931 – 29 August 1998) was a Belgian wrestler. He competed at the 1960 Summer Olympics and the 1964 Summer Olympics.
