= Bertil Nyström =

Swedish wrestler (born 1935)

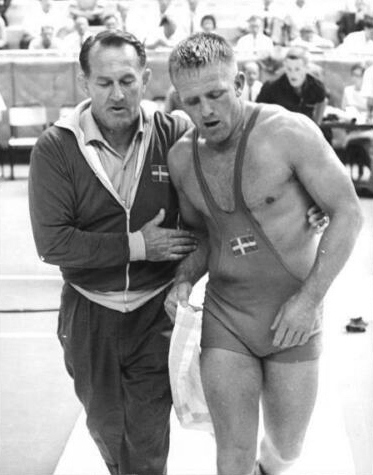
- Nyström with coach Rudolf Svedberg in 1963

Personal information
- Full name: Bertil Alexis Nyström
- Nickname: Totta
- Born: 22 May 1935 (age 91) Gråmanstorp, Klippan, Skåne, Sweden
- Height: 171 cm (5 ft 7 in)
- Weight: 73 kg (161 lb)

Sport
- Sport: Greco-Roman wrestling
- Club: Klippans BK
Medal record
Men's Greco-Roman wrestling
Representing Sweden
Olympic Games
Bronze medal – third place	1964 Tokyo	Welterweight
World Championships
Silver medal – second place	1961 Yokohama	79 kg
Bronze medal – third place	1963 Helsingborg	78 kg

Bertil Alexis "Totta" Nyström (born 22 May 1935) is a retired Greco-Roman wrestler from Sweden. He competed at the 1960, 1964 and 1968 Olympics and won a bronze medal in 1964. He also won two medals at the world championships of 1961 and 1963 and six national titles. Starting from 1973 he coached the national wrestling team.
