= Bolesław Dubicki =

Polish wrestler

Personal information
- Born: 16 September 1934 Warsaw, Poland
- Died: 15 February 2004 (aged 69) Warsaw, Poland
- Height: 165 cm (5 ft 5 in)
- Weight: 84 kg (185 lb)

Sport
- Country: Poland
- Sport: Wrestling

Bolesław Dubicki (16 September 1934 – 15 February 2004) was a Polish wrestler. He competed at the 1960 Summer Olympics and the 1964 Summer Olympics.
