= Bogomil (village) =

- Village
- Location within Bulgaria
- Coordinates: 41°59′N 26°01′E
- Country: Bulgaria
- Province: Haskovo Province
- Municipality: Harmanli
- Time zone: UTC+2 (EET)
  - Summer (DST): UTC+3 (EEST)

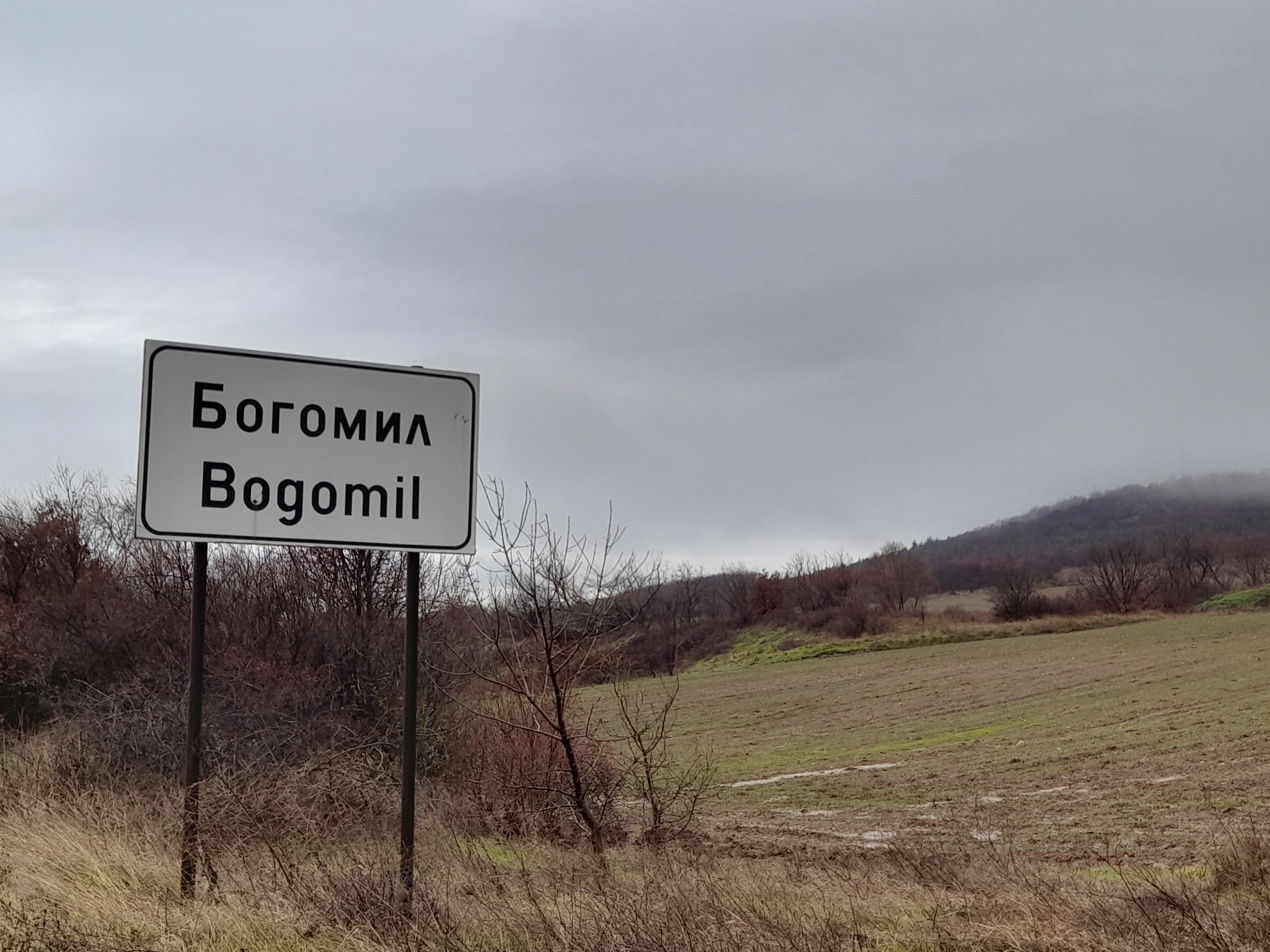
Bogomil village, Harmanli Municipality, Haskovo Region, Bulgaria

Bogomil is a village in the municipality of Harmanli, in Haskovo Province, in southern Bulgaria.
