= Slavyanovo, Haskovo Province =

Slavyanovo
- Village
- Location in Bulgaria
- Coordinates: 41.808°N 25.781°E
- Country: Bulgaria
- Province: Haskovo Province
- Municipality: Harmanli
- Time zone: UTC+2 (EET)
  - Summer (DST): UTC+3 (EEST)

Slavyanovo is a village in the municipality of Harmanli, in Haskovo Province, in southern Bulgaria.
