= Antal Rizmayer =

Hungarian wrestler (1939–2026)

Personal information
- Nationality: Hungarian
- Born: 5 September 1939 Budapest, Hungary
- Died: 12 August 2026 (aged 86)

Sport
- Sport: Wrestling

Antal Rizmayer (5 September 1939 – 12 August 2026) was a Hungarian wrestler. He competed at the 1960 Summer Olympics and the 1964 Summer Olympics.

Rizmayer died on 12 August 2026, at the age of 86.
