= Helmut Längle =

Austrian wrestler

Personal information
- Nationality: Austrian
- Born: 29 September 1936 (age 90) Zwischenwasser, Austria

Sport
- Sport: Wrestling

Helmut Längle (born 29 September 1936) is an Austrian wrestler. He competed at the 1960 Summer Olympics and the 1964 Summer Olympics.
