= Harald Barlie =

Norwegian Greco-Roman wrestler

Harald Barlie (4 January 1937 – 12 October 1995) was a Norwegian Greco-Roman wrestler.

== Biography ==
He was born at Klemetsrud and died in Oslo, and represented the sports clubs Oslo BK and SK av 1909. He was a brother of Åge, Kåre and Oddvar Barlie, an uncle of Ine and Mette Barlie and granduncle of Lene Barlie, all wrestlers.

Competing mostly in the welterweight or middleweight divisions, he finished sixth at both the 1966 European Wrestling Championships, the 1968 European Wrestling Championships and the 1970 World Wrestling Championships. He competed at the Summer Olympics in 1960, 1964, 1968 and 1972. Between 1959 and 1977 he took a total of seventeen Norwegian national titles. He became Nordic champion in 1968 and 1971.
