= Matti Laakso =

Finnish wrestler (1939–2020)

Matti Samuel Laakso (23 March 1939 – 3 November 2020) was a Finnish wrestler, who competed in the 1960 Summer Olympics, in the 1964 Summer Olympics, and in the 1972 Summer Olympics. He was born and died in Ilmajoki, and was the elder brother of Finnish wrestler, Martti Laakso.
