= Mette Barlie =

Norwegian sport wrestler (born 1964)

Personal information
- Born: 1964 (age 61–62)

Sport
- Sport: Wrestling
- Club: Kolbotn IL
Medal record
Women’s freestyle wrestling
Representing Norway
World Championships
Silver medal – second place	1995 Moscow	44 kg
Silver medal – second place	1997 Clermont-Ferrand	46 kg

Mette Barlie (born 1964) is a Norwegian sport wrestler who represented Kolbotn IL. Her achievements include winning two silver medals at the world championships, and three medals at the European championships.

== Biography ==
Barlie won silver medals at the 1995 and 1997 World Wrestling Championships, and has won three medals at the European championships (1996, 1997 and 1998).

Winning several national titles in wrestling, she was awarded the Kongepokal (King's Cup) trophy at the national championships twice, in 1997 and 1999. The King's Cup is awarded to the one female and one male athlete who obtains the assumed best result (among the various disciplines) during a senior national championship.
