= Harmanli =

Harmanli Харманли
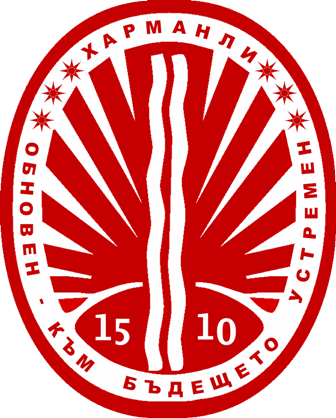
- Coat of arms

- Location of Harmanli
- Coordinates: 41°56′N 25°54′E
- Country: Bulgaria
- Province (Oblast): Haskovo

Government
  - Mayor: Cristiano Marchev
- Elevation: 60 m (200 ft)

Population (2021)
  - Total: 18,830
- Time zone: UTC+2 (EET)
  - Summer (DST): UTC+3 (EEST)
- Postal Code: 6450
- Area code: 0373

Harmanli (Bulgarian: Харманли [ˈxarmɐnli], Turkish: Harmanlı) is a town in Haskovo Province, south-central Bulgaria. It is the administrative centre of the eponymous Harmanli Municipality.

Near the site of Harmanli in Late Antiquity, during the early 4th-century Cibalensean War, the Battle of Mardia was fought between the Roman emperors Licinius and Constantine the Great. Harmanli was founded in 1510 along the road connecting Central Europe and Anatolia.

== Geography ==
Its territory spreads over some parts of the Upper Thracian Lowlands between the oblique south slopes of the Sredna Gora and precipitous north slopes of the Rhodope Mountains. The south boundary of the Thracian lowlands is outlined by the north Rhodope foot, along which it leans close on the north Rhodopes, between the lower end of the Momina Klisura defile (at 300 m elevation) and the beginning of the Harmanli defile (at 80 m elevation).

The Maritsa River flows near the city. The climate of the area is temperate continental, which determines the variety of the vegetative types, some of which pertain to the evergreen groups (south of Harmanli). The soils are mainly maroon and woody. It is located 270 km from the capital Sofia

== History ==
The first historical records of it date back to 1530, with the memoirs of Benedikt Kuripešič, who would sojourn there as an interpreter in his mission. Skilful masters built a solid caravansaray on the right bank of the Harmanli river (then Oludere). In order to facilitate travelers and tradesmen, a vaulted bridge was built in 1585 by the order of the Ottoman administrator Siyavuş Pasha. The marble inscription on the bridge reads as follows: "The world is a bridge, across which the way of the king and the poor man passes." The humpbacked bridge has been saved almost intact to this day. At Russo-Turkish War (1877–1878), there was the Harmanli massacre.

== Culture ==
A historic fountain was built in the place called White-legged Girl's Spring (Turkish: Ak baldır çeşmesi), half an hour's walk from the bridge. The legend about Gergana was celebrated in a poem by Petko Slaveikov. Another legend revolves around the story of boyar Valkashin or Vukasin, father of the legendary Krali Marko, who was killed near this spring fighting the Ottoman sultan Murad.

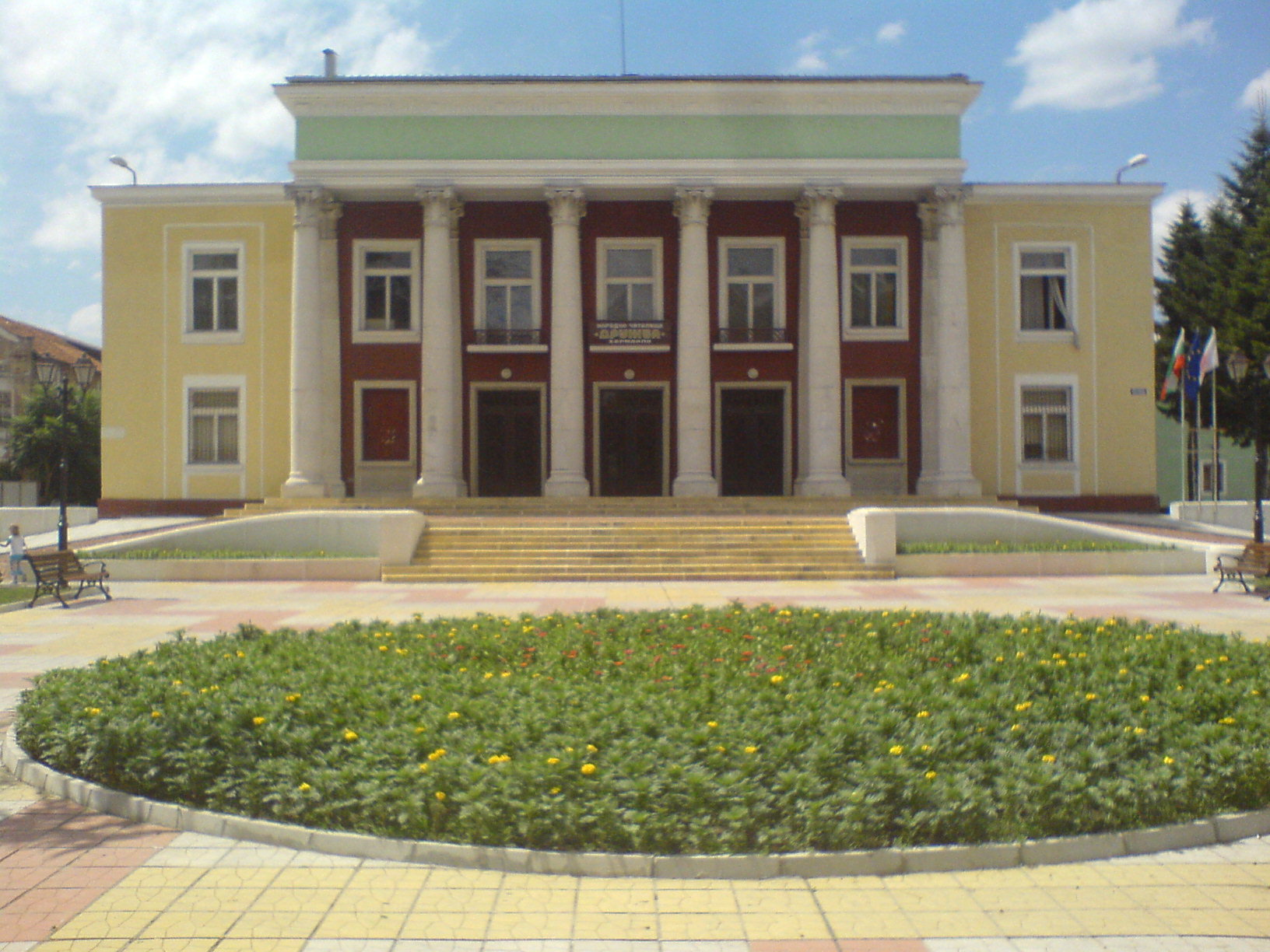
A cultural centre (chitalishte) in Harmanli.

=== Tourist attractions ===
The municipality area has a number of waterfalls in the areas of Kyumyurluka and Kuru Dere and the protected area of Defileto, as well as the historic spots the Karakolyuvata Kashta Cave, Hades Forest and Haidushkata Dupka, a small cave.

== Roads ==
Two transcontinental corridors intersect the municipality. The first one is from West and Central Europe, through Sofia - Harmanli - Svilengrad and Istanbul (European route E80 or І-8), and the second one is from northern Europe through Ruse - Haskovo - Harmanli and the Mediterranean, on which basis Pan-European Corridor IX will be developed in the future.

== Honours ==
Harmanli Cove in Antarctica is named after the town.

== Gallery ==
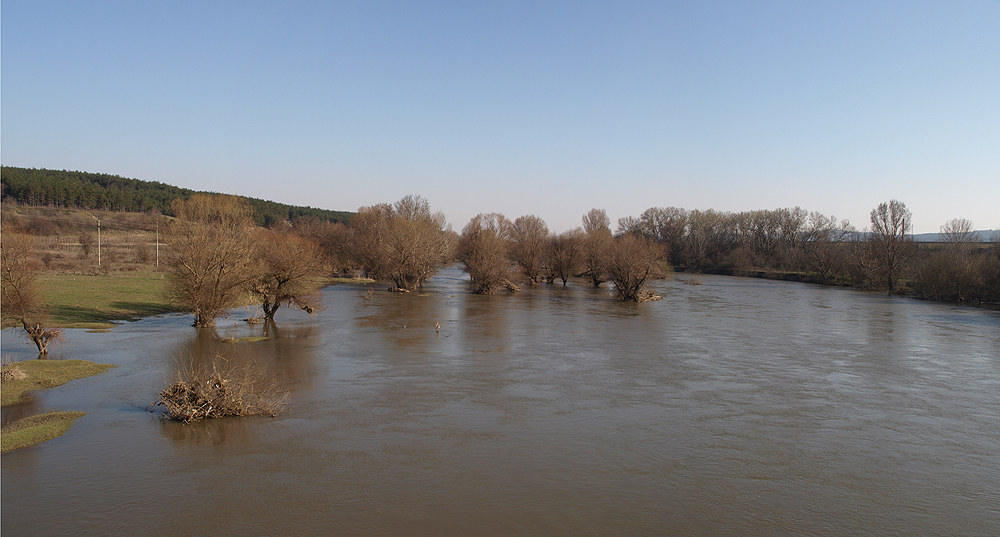
Spring Freshet of Marica River at Harmanli

Harmanli Surroundings

Rocks Near The City

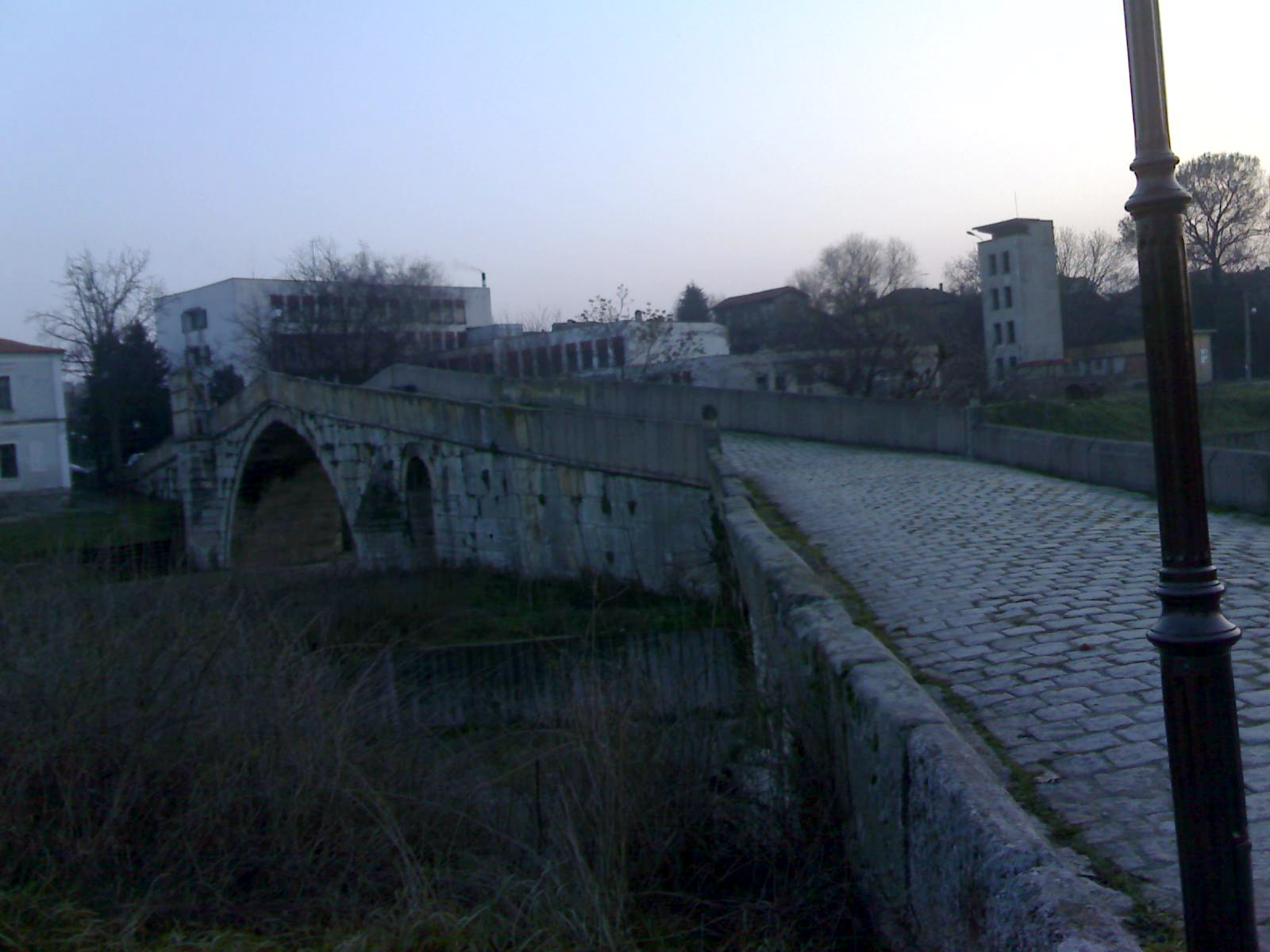
Humpback bridge

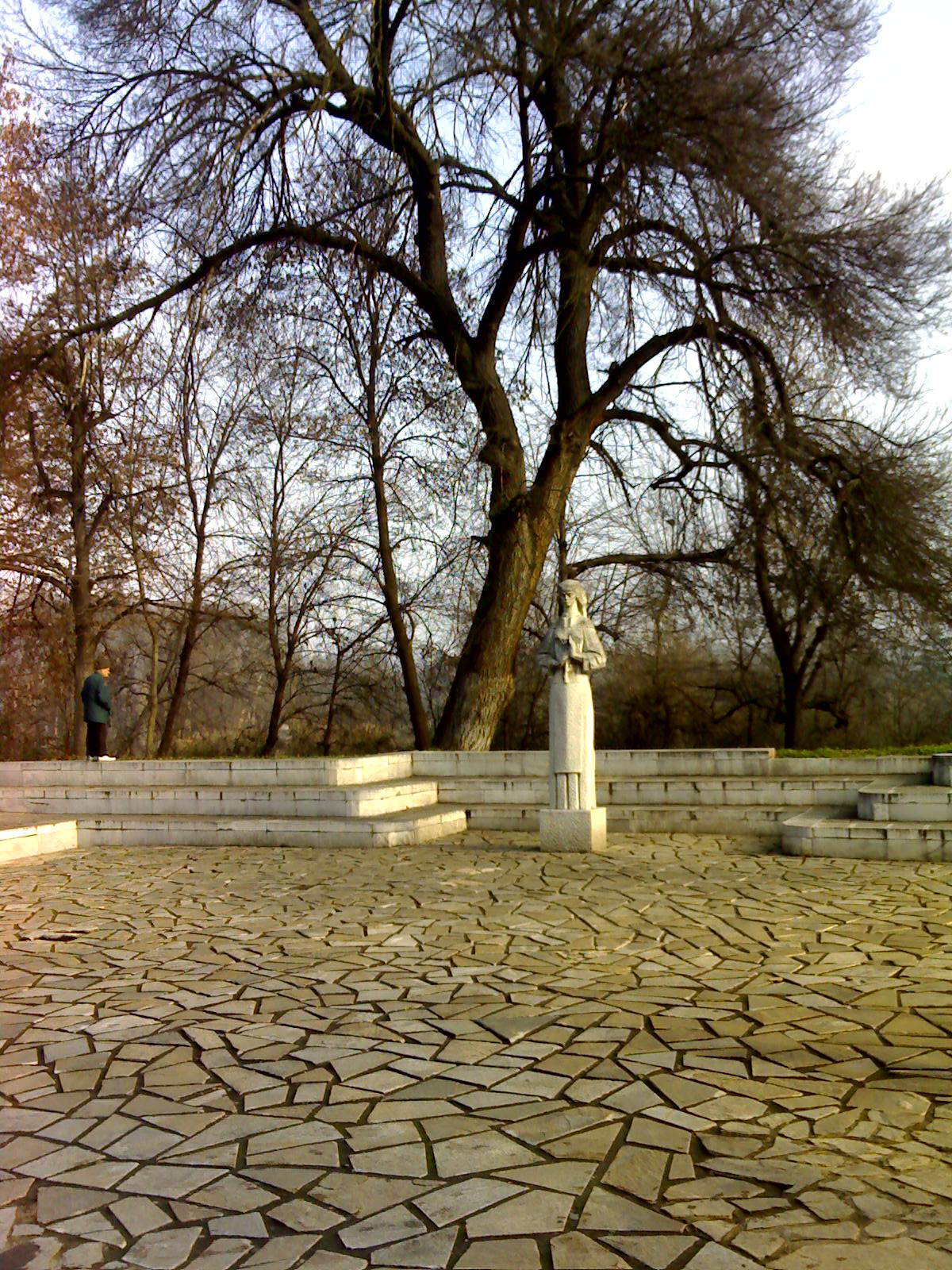
The Spring of the White-Legged
