= Wrestling at the 1972 Summer Olympics – Men's Greco-Roman 68 kg =

Men's Greco-Roman 68 kg at the Games of the XX Olympiad
- Venue: Messe München
- Dates: 5–10 September 1972
- Competitors: 23 from 23 nations

Medalists
1st place, gold medalist(s)		Shamil Khisamutdinov	Soviet Union
2nd place, silver medalist(s)		Stoyan Apostolov	Bulgaria
3rd place, bronze medalist(s)		Gian-Matteo Ranzi	Italy

The Men's Greco-Roman 68 kg at the 1972 Summer Olympics as part of the wrestling program at the Fairgrounds, Judo and Wrestling Hall.

== Medalists ==
Gold	Shamil Khisamutdinov; Soviet Union
Silver	Stoyan Apostolov; Bulgaria
Bronze	Gian-Matteo Ranzi; Italy

== Tournament results ==
The competition used a form of negative points tournament, with negative points given for any result short of a fall. Accumulation of 6 negative points eliminated the wrestler. When only two or three wrestlers remain, a special final round is used to determine the order of the medals.

Legend

- DNA — Did not appear
- TPP — Total penalty points
- MPP — Match penalty points

Penalties

- 0 — Won by Fall, Passivity, Injury and Forfeit
- 0.5 — Won by Technical Superiority
- 1 — Won by Points
- 2 — Draw
- 2.5 — Draw, Passivity
- 3 — Lost by Points
- 3.5 — Lost by Technical Superiority
- 4 — Lost by Fall, Passivity, Injury and Forfeit

=== Round 1 ===
TPP	MPP		Time		MPP	TPP
3	3	Veikko Lavonen (FIN)		Stoyan Apostolov (BUL)	1	1
1	1	Mohammad Dalirian (IRI)		Sotirios Nakos (GRE)	3	3
4	4	Andrzej Supron (POL)	5:58	Simion Popescu (ROU)	4	4
0	0	Shamil Khisamutdinov (URS)	6:29	Mohamed Gaber (EGY)	4	4
0	0	Seyyit Hışırlı (TUR)	8:26	Josef Brötzner (AUT)	4	4
4	4	Robert Buzzard (USA)	7:19	Gian-Matteo Ranzi (ITA)	0	0
0	0	Heinz Rhyn (SUI)	7:37	Ole Sorensen (CAN)	4	4
0	0	Takashi Tanoue (JPN)	6:47	Mohamed Bahamou (MAR)	4	4
0	0	Antal Steer (HUN)	4:00	Alberto Bremauntz (MEX)	4	4
2.5	2.5	Sreten Damjanović (YUG)		Manfred Schöndorfer (FRG)	2.5	2.5
3	3	Djan-Aka Djan (AFG)		Tage Juhl Weirum (DEN)	1	1
0		Klaus-Peter Göpfert (GDR)		Bye		

=== Round 2 ===
TPP	MPP		Time		MPP	TPP
4	4	Klaus-Peter Göpfert (GDR)	5:32	Veikko Lavonen (FIN)	4	7
1	0	Stoyan Apostolov (BUL)	2:32	Mohammad Dalirian (IRI)	4	5
7	4	Sotirios Nakos (GRE)	8:38	Andrzej Supron (POL)	0	4
8	4	Simion Popescu (ROU)	5:07	Shamil Khisamutdinov (URS)	0	0
0	0	Seyyit Hışırlı (TUR)	5:32	Robert Buzzard (USA)	4	8
7.5	3.5	Josef Brötzner (AUT)		Gian-Matteo Ranzi (ITA)	0.5	0.5
4	4	Heinz Rhyn (SUI)	7:45	Takashi Tanoue (JPN)	0	0
8	4	Ole Sorensen (CAN)	1:00	Mohamed Bahamou (MAR)	0	4
3	3	Antal Steer (HUN)		Sreten Damjanović (YUG)	1	3.5
8	4	Alberto Bremauntz (MEX)	5:17	Djan-Aka Djan (AFG)	0	3
2.5	0	Manfred Schöndorfer (FRG)	5:05	Tage Juhl Weirum (DEN)	4	5
4		Gaber Mohamed (EGY)		DNA		

=== Round 3 ===
TPP	MPP		Time		MPP	TPP
8	4	Klaus-Peter Göpfert (GDR)	8:31	Stoyan Apostolov (BUL)	0	1
9	4	Mohammad Dalirian (IRI)	2:26	Andrzej Supron (POL)	0	4
1	1	Shamil Khisamutdinov (URS)		Seyyit Hışırlı (TUR)	3	3
0.5	0	Gian-Matteo Ranzi (ITA)	8:15	Heinz Rhyn (SUI)	4	8
3	3	Takashi Tanoue (JPN)		Antal Steer (HUN)	1	4
8	4	Mohamed Bahamou (MAR)	6:50	Sreten Damjanović (YUG)	0	3.5
2.5	0	Manfred Schöndorfer (FRG)	4:08	Djan-Aka Djan (AFG)	4	7
5		Tage Juhl Weirum (DEN)		Bye		

=== Round 4 ===
TPP	MPP		Time		MPP	TPP
9	4	Tage Juhl Weirum (DEN)	2:56	Stoyan Apostolov (BUL)	0	1
8	4	Andrzej Supron (POL)	8:10	Shamil Khisamutdinov (URS)	0	1
6	3	Seyyit Hışırlı (TUR)		Gian-Matteo Ranzi (ITA)	1	1.5
3	0	Takashi Tanoue (JPN)	8:28	Sreten Damjanović (YUG)	4	7.5
6	2	Antal Steer (HUN)		Manfred Schöndorfer (FRG)	2	4.5

=== Round 5 ===
TPP	MPP		Time		MPP	TPP
4	3	Stoyan Apostolov (BUL)		Shamil Khisamutdinov (URS)	1	2
2.5	1	Gian-Matteo Ranzi (ITA)		Takashi Tanoue (JPN)	3	6
4.5		Manfred Schöndorfer (FRG)		Bye		

=== Round 6 ===
TPP	MPP		Time		MPP	TPP
7.5	3	Manfred Schöndorfer (FRG)		Stoyan Apostolov (BUL)	1	5
2.5	0.5	Shamil Khisamutdinov (URS)		Gian-Matteo Ranzi (ITA)	3.5	6

=== Final ===
Results from the preliminary round are carried forward into the final (shown in yellow).

TPP	MPP		Time		MPP	TPP
3	3	Stoyan Apostolov (BUL)		Shamil Khisamutdinov (URS)	1	1

== Final standings ==
1. Shamil Khisamutdinov (URS)
2. Stoyan Apostolov (BUL)
3. Gian-Matteo Ranzi (ITA)
4. Manfred Schöndorfer (FRG)
5. Takashi Tanoue (JPN)
6. Antal Steer (HUN) and Seyyit Hışırlı (TUR)
