= Wrestling at the 1972 Summer Olympics – Men's Greco-Roman 74 kg =

Men's Greco-Roman 74 kg at the Games of the XX Olympiad
- Venue: Messe München
- Dates: 5–10 September 1972
- Competitors: 20 from 20 nations

Medalists
1st place, gold medalist(s)		Vítězslav Mácha	Czechoslovakia
2nd place, silver medalist(s)		Petros Galaktopoulos	Greece
3rd place, bronze medalist(s)		Jan Karlsson	Sweden

The Men's Greco-Roman 74 kg at the 1972 Summer Olympics as part of the wrestling program at the Fairgrounds, Judo and Wrestling Hall.

== Medalists ==
Gold	Vítězslav Mácha; Czechoslovakia
Silver	Petros Galaktopoulos; Greece
Bronze	Jan Karlsson; Sweden

== Tournament results ==
The competition used a form of negative points tournament, with negative points given for any result short of a fall. Accumulation of 6 negative points eliminated the wrestler. When only two or three wrestlers remain, a special final round is used to determine the order of the medals.

Legend

- DNA — Did not appear
- TPP — Total penalty points
- MPP — Match penalty points

Penalties

- 0 — Won by Fall, Passivity, Injury and Forfeit
- 0.5 — Won by Technical Superiority
- 1 — Won by Points
- 2 — Draw
- 2.5 — Draw, Passivity
- 3 — Lost by Points
- 3.5 — Lost by Technical Superiority
- 4 — Lost by Fall, Passivity, Injury and Forfeit

=== Round 1 ===
TPP	MPP		Time		MPP	TPP
3	3	Vítězslav Mácha (TCH)		Ivan Kolev (BUL)	1	1
4	4	Nestor González (ARG)	2:20	Mehmet Türüt (TUR)	0	0
2	2	Werner Schröter (FRG)		Stanisław Krzesiński (POL)	2	2
4	4	Miklós Hegedűs (HUN)	8:36	Jiichiro Date (JPN)	0	0
1	1	Jan Karlsson (SWE)		Marcel Vlad (ROU)	3	3
3	3	Gary Neist (USA)		Momir Kecman (YUG)	1	1
0	0	Petros Galaktopoulos (GRE)	1:56	Constant Bens (BEL)	4	4
1	1	Viktor Igumenov (URS)		Franz Berger (AUT)	3	3
3.5	3.5	Robert Blaser (SUI)		Eero Tapio (FIN)	0.5	0.5
4	4	Klaus Pohl (GDR)	5:07	Daniel Robin (FRA)	0	0

=== Round 2 ===
TPP	MPP		Time		MPP	TPP
3	0	Vítězslav Mácha (TCH)	2:31	Nestor González (ARG)	4	8
1.5	0.5	Ivan Kolev (BUL)		Mehmet Türüt (TUR)	3.5	3.5
4	2	Werner Schröter (FRG)		Miklós Hegedűs (HUN)	2	6
3	1	Stanisław Krzesiński (POL)		Jiichiro Date (JPN)	3	3
2	1	Jan Karlsson (SWE)		Gary Neist (USA)	3	6
6	3	Marcel Vlad (ROU)		Momir Kecman (YUG)	1	2
2	2	Petros Galaktopoulos (GRE)		Viktor Igumenov (URS)	2	3
8	4	Constant Bens (BEL)	1:26	Franz Berger (AUT)	0	3
7.5	4	Robert Blaser (SUI)	0:59	Klaus Pohl (GDR)	0	4
2.5	2	Eero Tapio (FIN)		Daniel Robin (FRA)	2	2

=== Round 3 ===
TPP	MPP		Time		MPP	TPP
3.5	0.5	Vítězslav Mácha (TCH)		Mehmet Türüt (TUR)	3.5	7
4.5	3	Ivan Kolev (BUL)		Werner Schröter (FRG)	1	5
7	4	Stanisław Krzesiński (POL)	8:47	Jan Karlsson (SWE)	0	2
7	4	Jiichiro Date (JPN)	8:31	Momir Kecman (YUG)	0	2
3	1	Petros Galaktopoulos (GRE)		Franz Berger (AUT)	3	6
5.5	3	Eero Tapio (FIN)		Klaus Pohl (GDR)	1	5
2		Daniel Robin (FRA)		Bye		
3		Viktor Igumenov (URS)		DNA		

=== Round 4 ===
TPP	MPP		Time		MPP	TPP
5	3	Daniel Robin (FRA)		Vítězslav Mácha (TCH)	1	4.5
5.5	1	Ivan Kolev (BUL)		Jan Karlsson (SWE)	3	5
7.5	2.5	Werner Schröter (FRG)		Momir Kecman (YUG)	2.5	4.5
3	0	Petros Galaktopoulos (GRE)	7:23	Eero Tapio (FIN)	4	9.5
5		Klaus Pohl (GDR)		Bye		

=== Round 5 ===
TPP	MPP		Time		MPP	TPP
8	3	Klaus Pohl (GDR)		Vítězslav Mácha (TCH)	1	5.5
8	3	Daniel Robin (FRA)		Ivan Kolev (BUL)	1	6.5
6	1	Jan Karlsson (SWE)		Momir Kecman (YUG)	3	7.5
3		Petros Galaktopoulos (GRE)		Bye		

=== Final ===
Results from the preliminary round are carried forward into the final (shown in yellow).

TPP	MPP		Time		MPP	TPP
3	3	Petros Galaktopoulos (GRE)		Vítězslav Mácha (TCH)	1	1

== Final standings ==
1. Vítězslav Mácha (TCH)
2. Petros Galaktopoulos (GRE)
3. Jan Karlsson (SWE)
4. Ivan Kolev (BUL)
5. Momir Kecman (YUG)
6. Daniel Robin (FRA)
7. Klaus Pohl (GDR)
