= Wrestling at the 1976 Summer Olympics – Men's Greco-Roman 68 kg =

Men's Greco-Roman 68 kg at the Games of the XXI Olympiad
- Venue: Maurice Richard Arena
- Dates: 20–24 July 1976
- Competitors: 21 from 21 nations

Medalists
1st place, gold medalist(s)		Suren Nalbandyan	Soviet Union
2nd place, silver medalist(s)		Ștefan Rusu	Romania
3rd place, bronze medalist(s)		Heinz-Helmut Wehling	East Germany

The Men's Greco-Roman 68 kg at the 1976 Summer Olympics as part of the wrestling program were held at the Maurice Richard Arena.

== Medalists ==
Gold	Suren Nalbandyan; Soviet Union
Silver	Ștefan Rusu; Romania
Bronze	Heinz-Helmut Wehling; East Germany

== Tournament results ==
The competition used a form of negative points tournament, with negative points given for any result short of a fall. Accumulation of 6 negative points eliminated the loser wrestler. When only three wrestlers remain, a special final round is used to determine the order of the medals.

Legend

- TF — Won by Fall
- IN — Won by Opponent Injury
- DQ — Won by Passivity
- D1 — Won by Passivity, the winner is passive too
- D2 — Both wrestlers lost by Passivity
- FF — Won by Forfeit
- DNA — Did not appear
- TPP — Total penalty points
- MPP — Match penalty points

Penalties

- 0 — Won by Fall, Technical Superiority, Passivity, Injury and Forfeit
- 0.5 — Won by Points, 8-11 points difference
- 1 — Won by Points, 1-7 points difference
- 2 — Won by Passivity, the winner is passive too
- 3 — Lost by Points, 1-7 points difference
- 3.5 — Lost by Points, 8-11 points difference
- 4 — Lost by Fall, Technical Superiority, Passivity, Injury and Forfeit

=== Round 1 ===
TPP	MPP		Score		MPP	TPP
0	0	Patrick Marcy (USA)	TF / 5:00	Mohamed Bahamou (MAR)	4	4
3	3	Manfred Schöndorfer (FRG)	4 - 6	Heinz-Helmut Wehling (GDR)	1	1
0	0	Erol Mutlu (TUR)	DQ / 5:10	Erasmo Estrada (CUB)	4	4
0	0	Markku Yli-Isotalo (FIN)	TF / 5:32	Lars-Erik Skiöld (SWE)	4	4
4	4	Arona Mané (SEN)	TF / 1:55	Jafar Alizadeh (IRI)	0	0
0	0	Ferenc Toma (HUN)	TF / 5:26	Sergio Fiszman (ARG)	4	4
0	0	Suren Nalbandyan (URS)	DQ / 7:23	Nedelcho Nedev (BUL)	4	4
4	4	Andrzej Supron (POL)	1 - 13	Ștefan Rusu (ROU)	0	0
0	0	Jacques Van Lancker (BEL)	TF / 2:04	John McPhedran (CAN)	4	4
0	0	Kim Hae-myeong (KOR)	TF / 6:25	Takeshi Kobayashi (JPN)	4	4
0		Gian-Matteo Ranzi (ITA)		Bye		

=== Round 2 ===
TPP	MPP		Score		MPP	TPP
1	1	Gian-Matteo Ranzi (ITA)	10 - 4	Patrick Marcy (USA)	3	3
4	1	Manfred Schöndorfer (FRG)	7 - 6	Erol Mutlu (TUR)	3	3
1	0	Heinz-Helmut Wehling (GDR)	TF / 2:22	Erasmo Estrada (CUB)	4	8
0	0	Markku Yli-Isotalo (FIN)	TF / 0:44	Arona Mané (SEN)	4	8
4	0	Lars-Erik Skiöld (SWE)	22 - 8	Jafar Alizadeh (IRI)	4	4
4	4	Ferenc Toma (HUN)	DQ / 6:56	Suren Nalbandyan (URS)	0	0
8	4	Sergio Fiszman (ARG)	TF / 1:30	Nedelcho Nedev (BUL)	0	4
4	0	Andrzej Supron (POL)	TF / 5:04	Jacques van Lancker (BEL)	4	4
0	0	Ștefan Rusu (ROU)	TF / 2:49	Kim Hae-Myung (KOR)	4	4
8	4	John McPhedran (CAN)	2 - 18	Takeshi Kobayashi (JPN)	0	4
4		Mohamed Bahamou (MAR)		DNA		

=== Round 3 ===
TPP	MPP		Score		MPP	TPP
5	4	Gian-Matteo Ranzi (ITA)	TF / 7:14	Manfred Schöndorfer (FRG)	0	4
7	4	Patrick Marcy (USA)	DQ / 4:01	Heinz-Helmut Wehling (GDR)	0	1
3	0	Erol Mutlu (TUR)	DQ / 7:08	Markku Yli-Isotalo (FIN)	4	4
4.5	0.5	Lars-Erik Skiöld (SWE)	13 - 2	Ferenc Toma (HUN)	3.5	7.5
8	4	Jafar Alizadeh (IRI)	TF / 2:50	Suren Nalbandyan (URS)	0	0
7	3	Nedelcho Nedev (BUL)	7 - 9	Andrzej Supron (POL)	1	5
0	0	Ștefan Rusu (ROU)	DQ / 3:45	Takeshi Kobayashi (JPN)	4	8
8	4	Jacques van Lancker (BEL)	TF / 0:18	Kim Hae-Myung (KOR)	0	4

=== Round 4 ===
TPP	MPP		Score		MPP	TPP
9	4	Gian-Matteo Ranzi (ITA)	DQ / 7:40	Heinz-Helmut Wehling (GDR)	0	1
5	1	Manfred Schöndorfer (FRG)	9 - 3	Markku Yli-Isotalo (FIN)	3	7
6	3	Erol Mutlu (TUR)	7 - 10	Lars-Erik Skiöld (SWE)	1	5.5
1	1	Suren Nalbandyan (URS)	5 - 3	Ștefan Rusu (ROU)	3	3
5	0	Andrzej Supron (POL)	TF / 1:47	Kim Hae-Myung (KOR)	4	8

=== Round 5 ===
TPP	MPP		Score		MPP	TPP
9	4	Manfred Schöndorfer (FRG)	TF / 4:54	Lars-Erik Skiöld (SWE)	0	5.5
5	4	Heinz-Helmut Wehling (GDR)	DQ / 7:54	Ștefan Rusu (ROU)	0	3
2	1	Suren Nalbandyan (URS)	7 - 4	Andrzej Supron (POL)	3	8

=== Round 6 ===
TPP	MPP		Score		MPP	TPP
8	3	Heinz-Helmut Wehling (GDR)	9 - 12	Suren Nalbandyan (URS)	1	3
9.5	4	Lars-Erik Skiöld (SWE)	DQ / 6:53	Ștefan Rusu (ROU)	0	3

=== Final ===
Results from the preliminary round are carried forward into the final (shown in yellow).

TPP	MPP		Score		MPP	TPP
	1	Suren Nalbandyan (URS)	5 - 3	Ștefan Rusu (ROU)	3	
	4	Heinz-Helmut Wehling (GDR)	DQ / 7:54	Ștefan Rusu (ROU)	0	3
7	3	Heinz-Helmut Wehling (GDR)	9 - 12	Suren Nalbandyan (URS)	1	2

== Final standings ==
1. Suren Nalbandyan (URS)
2. Ștefan Rusu (ROU)
3. Heinz-Helmut Wehling (GDR)
4. Lars-Erik Skiöld (SWE)
5. Andrzej Supron (POL)
6. Manfred Schöndorfer (FRG)
7. Erol Mutlu (TUR)
8. Markku Yli-Isotalo (FIN)
