= Wrestling at the 1980 Summer Olympics – Men's Greco-Roman 74 kg =

Men's Greco-Roman 74 kg at the Games of the XXII Olympiad
- Venue: Central Sports Club of the Army
- Dates: 21–23 July 1980
- Competitors: 14 from 14 nations

Medalists
1st place, gold medalist(s)		Ferenc Kocsis	Hungary
2nd place, silver medalist(s)		Anatoly Bykov	Soviet Union
3rd place, bronze medalist(s)		Mikko Huhtala	Finland

The Men's Greco-Roman 74 kg at the 1980 Summer Olympics as part of the wrestling program were held at the Athletics Fieldhouse, Central Sports Club of the Army.

== Medalists ==
Gold	Ferenc Kocsis; Hungary
Silver	Anatoly Bykov; Soviet Union
Bronze	Mikko Huhtala; Finland

== Tournament results ==
The competition used a form of negative points tournament, with negative points given for any result short of a fall. Accumulation of 6 negative points eliminated the loser wrestler. When only three wrestlers remain, a special final round is used to determine the order of the medals.

Legend

- TF — Won by Fall
- IN — Won by Opponent Injury
- DQ — Won by Passivity
- D1 — Won by Passivity, the winner is passive too
- D2 — Both wrestlers lost by Passivity
- FF — Won by Forfeit
- DNA — Did not appear
- TPP — Total penalty points
- MPP — Match penalty points

Penalties

- 0 — Won by Fall, Technical Superiority, Passivity, Injury and Forfeit
- 0.5 — Won by Points, 8-11 points difference
- 1 — Won by Points, 1-7 points difference
- 2 — Won by Passivity, the winner is passive too
- 3 — Lost by Points, 1-7 points difference
- 3.5 — Lost by Points, 8-11 points difference
- 4 — Lost by Fall, Technical Superiority, Passivity, Injury and Forfeit

=== Round 1 ===
TPP	MPP		Score		MPP	TPP
0	0	Ferenc Kocsis (HUN)	TF / 4:38	Kaj Jægergaard (DEN)	4	4
4	4	Karolj Kasap (YUG)	DQ / 7:57	Yanko Chopov (BUL)	0	0
3	3	Jacques van Lancker (BEL)	6 - 8	Vítězslav Mácha (TCH)	1	1
4	4	Jamal Moughrabi (SYR)	TF / 3:35	Lennart Lundell (SWE)	0	0
1	1	Anatoly Bykov (URS)	6 - 5	Wiesław Dziadura (POL)	3	3
4	4	Idalberto Barbán (CUB)	TF / 1:31	Mikko Huhtala (FIN)	0	0
1	1	Gheorghe Minea (ROU)	12 - 6	Ahmed Lutfi Shihad (IRQ)	3	3

=== Round 2 ===
TPP	MPP		Score		MPP	TPP
0	0	Ferenc Kocsis (HUN)	DQ / 7:13	Karolj Kasap (YUG)	4	8
8	4	Kaj Jægergaard (DEN)	TF / 2:28	Yanko Chopov (BUL)	0	0
3	0	Jacques van Lancker (BEL)	TF / 2:47	Jamal Moughrabi (SYR)	4	8
2	1	Vítězslav Mácha (TCH)	3 - 3	Lennart Lundell (SWE)	3	3
1	0	Anatoly Bykov (URS)	DQ / 4:58	Idalberto Barbán (CUB)	4	8
4	1	Wiesław Dziadura (POL)	4 - 3	Gheorghe Minea (ROU)	3	4
0	0	Mikko Huhtala (FIN)	DQ / 5:56	Lutfi Shihab Ahmed (IRQ)	4	7

=== Round 3 ===
TPP	MPP		Score		MPP	TPP
1	1	Ferenc Kocsis (HUN)	4 - 3	Yanko Chopov (BUL)	3	3
7	4	Jacques van Lancker (BEL)	DQ / 7:08	Lennart Lundell (SWE)	0	3
5	3	Vítězslav Mácha (TCH)	2 - 4	Anatoly Bykov (URS)	1	2
7	3	Wiesław Dziadura (POL)	3 - 7	Mikko Huhtala (FIN)	1	1
4		Gheorghe Minea (ROU)		Bye		

=== Round 4 ===
TPP	MPP		Score		MPP	TPP
8	4	Gheorghe Minea (ROU)	TF / 2:45	Ferenc Kocsis (HUN)	0	1
4	1	Yanko Chopov (BUL)	6 - 2	Vítězslav Mácha (TCH)	3	8
6	3	Lennart Lundell (SWE)	4 - 10	Anatoly Bykov (URS)	1	3
1		Mikko Huhtala (FIN)		Bye		

=== Round 5 ===
TPP	MPP		Score		MPP	TPP
5	4	Mikko Huhtala (FIN)	TF / 5:44	Ferenc Kocsis (HUN)	0	1
7	3	Yanko Chopov (BUL)	4 - 5	Anatoly Bykov (URS)	1	4

=== Final ===
Results from the preliminary round are carried forward into the final (shown in yellow).

TPP	MPP		Score		MPP	TPP
	4	Mikko Huhtala (FIN)	TF / 5:44	Ferenc Kocsis (HUN)	0	
7	3	Mikko Huhtala (FIN)	4 - 7	Anatoly Bykov (URS)	1	
2	2	Ferenc Kocsis (HUN)	D1 / 7:21	Anatoly Bykov (URS)	4	5

== Final standings ==
1. Ferenc Kocsis (HUN)
2. Anatoly Bykov (URS)
3. Mikko Huhtala (FIN)
4. Yanko Chopov (BUL)
5. Lennart Lundell (SWE)
6. Vítězslav Mácha (TCH)
7. Gheorghe Minea (ROU)
8. Jacques van Lancker (BEL)
