= Wrestling at the 1980 Summer Olympics – Men's Greco-Roman 68 kg =

Men's Greco-Roman 68 kg at the Games of the XXII Olympiad
- Venue: Central Sports Club of the Army
- Dates: 22–24 July 1980
- Competitors: 15 from 15 nations

Medalists
1st place, gold medalist(s)		Ștefan Rusu	Romania
2nd place, silver medalist(s)		Andrzej Supron	Poland
3rd place, bronze medalist(s)		Lars-Erik Skiöld	Sweden

The Men's Greco-Roman 68 kg at the 1980 Summer Olympics as part of the wrestling program were held at the Athletics Fieldhouse, Central Sports Club of the Army.

== Medalists ==
Gold	Ștefan Rusu; Romania
Silver	Andrzej Supron; Poland
Bronze	Lars-Erik Skiöld; Sweden

== Tournament results ==
The competition used a form of negative points tournament, with negative points given for any result short of a fall. Accumulation of 6 negative points eliminated the loser wrestler. When only three wrestlers remain, a special final round is used to determine the order of the medals.

Legend

- TF — Won by Fall
- IN — Won by Opponent Injury
- DQ — Won by Passivity
- D1 — Won by Passivity, the winner is passive too
- D2 — Both wrestlers lost by Passivity
- FF — Won by Forfeit
- DNA — Did not appear
- TPP — Total penalty points
- MPP — Match penalty points

Penalties

- 0 — Won by Fall, Technical Superiority, Passivity, Injury and Forfeit
- 0.5 — Won by Points, 8-11 points difference
- 1 — Won by Points, 1-7 points difference
- 2 — Won by Passivity, the winner is passive too
- 3 — Lost by Points, 1-7 points difference
- 3.5 — Lost by Points, 8-11 points difference
- 4 — Lost by Fall, Technical Superiority, Passivity, Injury and Forfeit

=== Round 1 ===
TPP	MPP		Score		MPP	TPP
4	4	Lionel Lacaze (FRA)	DQ / 5:25	Ferenc Čaba (YUG)	0	0
4	4	Ivan Atanasov (BUL)	TF / 5:35	Ștefan Rusu (ROU)	0	0
4	4	Tapio Sipilä (FIN)	DQ / 5:16	Suren Nalbandyan (URS)	0	0
4	4	Mohamed Moualek (ALG)	TF / 0:58	Károly Gaál (HUN)	0	0
0	0	Andrzej Supron (POL)	DQ / 5:28	Sakhidad Hamidi (AFG)	4	4
1	1	Buyandelgeriin Bold (MGL)	18 - 15	Mohammed Moustafa Mahmoud (IRQ)	3	3
0	0	Lars-Erik Skiöld (SWE)	TF / 4:01	Reinhard Hartmann (AUT)	4	4
0		Khaled El-Khaled (SYR)		Bye		

=== Round 2 ===
TPP	MPP		Score		MPP	TPP
4	4	Khaled El-Khaled (SYR)	DQ / 4:26	Lionel Lacaze (FRA)	0	4
3	3	Ferenc Čaba (YUG)	2 - 7	Ivan Atanasov (BUL)	1	5
0	0	Ștefan Rusu (ROU)	TF / 3:48	Tapio Sipilä (FIN)	4	8
0	0	Suren Nalbandyan (URS)	DQ / 4:56	Mohamed Moualek (ALG)	4	8
4	4	Károly Gaál (HUN)	DQ / 8:27	Andrzej Supron (POL)	0	0
8	4	Sakhidad Hamidi (AFG)	DQ / 5:47	Buyandelgeriin Bold (MGL)	0	1
7	4	Mohammed Moustafa Mahmoud (IRQ)	DQ / 5:07	Lars-Erik Skiöld (SWE)	0	0
4		Reinhard Hartmann (AUT)		Bye		

=== Round 3 ===
TPP	MPP		Score		MPP	TPP
4	0	Reinhard Hartmann (AUT)	DQ / 6:46	Khaled El-Khaled (SYR)	4	8
8	4	Lionel Lacaze (FRA)	DQ / 8:36	Ivan Atanasov (BUL)	0	5
7	4	Ferenc Čaba (YUG)	TF / 7:30	Ștefan Rusu (ROU)	0	0
1	1	Suren Nalbandyan (URS)	4 - 2	Károly Gaál (HUN)	3	7
0	0	Andrzej Supron (POL)	TF / 7:10	Buyandelgeriin Bold (MGL)	4	5
0		Lars-Erik Skiöld (SWE)		Bye		

=== Round 4 ===
TPP	MPP		Score		MPP	TPP
1	1	Lars-Erik Skiöld (SWE)	10 - 10	Ivan Atanasov (BUL)	3	8
8	4	Reinhard Hartmann (AUT)	TF / 3:37	Ștefan Rusu (ROU)	0	0
4	3	Suren Nalbandyan (URS)	2 - 4	Andrzej Supron (POL)	1	1
5		Buyandelgeriin Bold (MGL)		Bye		

=== Round 5 ===
TPP	MPP		Score		MPP	TPP
9	4	Buyandelgeriin Bold (MGL)	TF / 3:34	Lars-Erik Skiöld (SWE)	0	0
4	4	Ștefan Rusu (ROU)	D2 / 7:09	Suren Nalbandyan (URS)	4	8
1		Andrzej Supron (POL)		Bye		

=== Final ===
TPP	MPP		Score		MPP	TPP
	0	Andrzej Supron (POL)	TF / 3:08	Lars-Erik Skiöld (SWE)	4	
	1	Ștefan Rusu (ROU)	3 - 2	Andrzej Supron (POL)	3	3
7	3	Lars-Erik Skiöld (SWE)	1 - 5	Ștefan Rusu (ROU)	1	2

== Final standings ==
1. Ștefan Rusu (ROU)
2. Andrzej Supron (POL)
3. Lars-Erik Skiöld (SWE)
4. Suren Nalbandyan (URS)
5. Buyandelgeriin Bold (MGL)
6. Ivan Atanasov (BUL)
7. Reinhard Hartmann (AUT)
8. Károly Gaál (HUN)
