= Wrestling at the 1976 Summer Olympics – Men's Greco-Roman 74 kg =

Men's Greco-Roman 74 kg at the Games of the XXI Olympiad
- Venue: Maurice Richard Arena
- Dates: 20–24 July 1976
- Competitors: 18 from 18 nations

Medalists
1st place, gold medalist(s)		Anatoly Bykov	Soviet Union
2nd place, silver medalist(s)		Vítězslav Mácha	Czechoslovakia
3rd place, bronze medalist(s)		Karl-Heinz Helbing	West Germany

The Men's Greco-Roman 74 kg at the 1976 Summer Olympics as part of the wrestling program were held at the Maurice Richard Arena.

== Medalists ==
Gold	Anatoly Bykov; Soviet Union
Silver	Vítězslav Mácha; Czechoslovakia
Bronze	Karl-Heinz Helbing; West Germany

== Tournament results ==
The competition used a form of negative points tournament, with negative points given for any result short of a fall. Accumulation of 6 negative points eliminated the loser wrestler. When only three wrestlers remain, a special final round is used to determine the order of the medals.

Legend

- TF — Won by Fall
- IN — Won by Opponent Injury
- DQ — Won by Passivity
- D1 — Won by Passivity, the winner is passive too
- D2 — Both wrestlers lost by Passivity
- FF — Won by Forfeit
- DNA — Did not appear
- TPP — Total penalty points
- MPP — Match penalty points

Penalties

- 0 — Won by Fall, Technical Superiority, Passivity, Injury and Forfeit
- 0.5 — Won by Points, 8-11 points difference
- 1 — Won by Points, 1-7 points difference
- 2 — Won by Passivity, the winner is passive too
- 3 — Lost by Points, 1-7 points difference
- 3.5 — Lost by Points, 8-11 points difference
- 4 — Lost by Fall, Technical Superiority, Passivity, Injury and Forfeit

=== Round 1 ===
TPP	MPP		Score		MPP	TPP
0	0	Yasuo Nagatomo (JPN)	IN / 5:25	Jamtsyn Davaajav (MGL)	4	4
4	4	Gheorghe Ciobotaru (ROU)	D2 / 8:00	Jan Karlsson (SWE)	4	4
4	4	Brahim Toughza (MAR)	DQ / 8:00	Hans Kiss (AUT)	0	0
4	4	Stanisław Krzesiński (POL)	DQ / 5:15	Mikko Huhtala (FIN)	0	0
1	1	Idalberto Barban (CUB)	13 - 10	John Matthews (USA)	3	3
4	4	Klaus-Peter Göpfert (GDR)	DQ / 8:17	Vítězslav Mácha (TCH)	0	0
0	0	Petros Galaktopoulos (GRE)	TF / 4:54	Brian Renken (CAN)	4	4
0	0	Yanko Chopov (BUL)	DQ / 7:54	Mihály Toma (HUN)	4	4
4	4	Karl-Heinz Helbing (FRG)	DQ / 7:56	Anatoly Bykov (URS)	0	0

=== Round 2 ===
TPP	MPP		Score		MPP	TPP
4	4	Yasuo Nagatomo (JPN)	DQ / 6:50	Gheorghe Ciobotaru (ROU)	0	4
4	0	Jan Karlsson (SWE)	TF / 2:40	Hans Kiss (AUT)	4	4
4	0	Stanisław Krzesiński (POL)	DQ / 7:53	Idalberto Barbán (CUB)	4	5
0	0	Mikko Huhtala (FIN)	DQ / 4:24	John Matthews (USA)	4	7
5	1	Klaus-Peter Göpfert (GDR)	9 - 6	Petros Galaktopoulos (GRE)	3	3
0	0	Vítězslav Mácha (TCH)	DQ / 6:57	Brian Renken (CAN)	4	8
4	4	Yanko Chopov (BUL)	D1 / 4:34	Karl-Heinz Helbing (FRG)	2	6
8	4	Mihály Toma (HUN)	DQ / 7:44	Anatoly Bykov (URS)	0	0
4		Jamtsyn Davaajav (MGL)		DNA		
4		Brahim Toughza (MAR)		DNA		

=== Round 3 ===
TPP	MPP		Score		MPP	TPP
7	3	Yasuo Nagatomo (JPN)	5 - 10	Jan Karlsson (SWE)	1	5
4	0	Gheorghe Ciobotaru (ROU)	TF / 5:41	Hans Kiss (AUT)	4	8
8	4	Stanisław Krzesiński (POL)	TF / 1:14	Klaus-Peter Göpfert (GDR)	0	5
0.5	0.5	Mikko Huhtala (FIN)	12 - 3	Idalberto Barbán (CUB)	3.5	8.5
0.5	0.5	Vítězslav Mácha (TCH)	12 - 2	Yanko Chopov (BUL)	3.5	7.5
7	4	Petros Galaktopoulos (GRE)	TF / 3:55	Karl-Heinz Helbing (FRG)	0	6
0		Anatoly Bykov (URS)		Bye		

=== Round 4 ===
TPP	MPP		Score		MPP	TPP
1	1	Anatoly Bykov (URS)	7 - 6	Gheorghe Ciobotaru (ROU)	3	7
8	3	Jan Karlsson (SWE)	5 - 9	Klaus-Peter Göpfert (GDR)	1	6
3.5	3	Mikko Huhtala (FIN)	3 - 4	Vítězslav Mácha (TCH)	1	1.5
6		Karl-Heinz Helbing (FRG)		Bye		

=== Round 5 ===
TPP	MPP		Score		MPP	TPP
6	0	Karl-Heinz Helbing (FRG)	TF / 2:09	Mikko Huhtala (FIN)	4	7.5
1	0	Anatoly Bykov (URS)	DQ / 8:54	Klaus-Peter Göpfert (GDR)	4	10
1.5		Vítězslav Mácha (TCH)		Bye		

=== Final ===
Results from the preliminary round are carried forward into the final (shown in yellow).

TPP	MPP		Score		MPP	TPP
	4	Karl-Heinz Helbing (FRG)	DQ / 7:56	Anatoly Bykov (URS)	0	
	0	Vítězslav Mácha (TCH)	DQ / 8:52	Karl-Heinz Helbing (FRG)	4	8
1	1	Anatoly Bykov (URS)	7 - 3	Vítězslav Mácha (TCH)	3	3

== Final standings ==
1. Anatoly Bykov (URS)
2. Vítězslav Mácha (TCH)
3. Karl-Heinz Helbing (FRG)
4. Mikko Huhtala (FIN)
5. Klaus-Peter Göpfert (GDR)
6. Gheorghe Ciobotaru (ROU)
7. Jan Karlsson (SWE)
8. Petros Galaktopoulos (GRE)
