= Alberto Bremauntz =

Mexican wrestler

Alberto Bremauntz Monge (16 January 1936 – 16 December 2006) was a Mexican wrestler who competed in the Greco-Roman style. He participated in the 1972 Olympics in Munich in 1972, where he was eliminated in the second round in the 68 kg class. He lost to Antal Steer of Hungary and Djan-Aka Djan of Afghanistan. Professionally, he was a chemist.

== Sources ==
- Evans, Hilary; Gjerde, Arild; Heijmans, Jeroen; Mallon, Bill; et al. "Alberto Bremauntz". Olympics at Sports-Reference.com. Sports Reference LLC. Archived from the original on 2016-12-02.
- Forjadores de la química en México - Alberto Bremauntz Monge, QuimiNet (in Spanish)
