= Lavonen =

Surname list

Lavonen is a surname. Notable people with the surname include:

- Kuutti Lavonen (born 1960), Finnish painter, photographer, and graphic artist
- Veikko Lavonen (born 1945), Finnish wrestler
