= Anatoly Bykov (wrestler) =

Soviet Greco-Roman wrestler

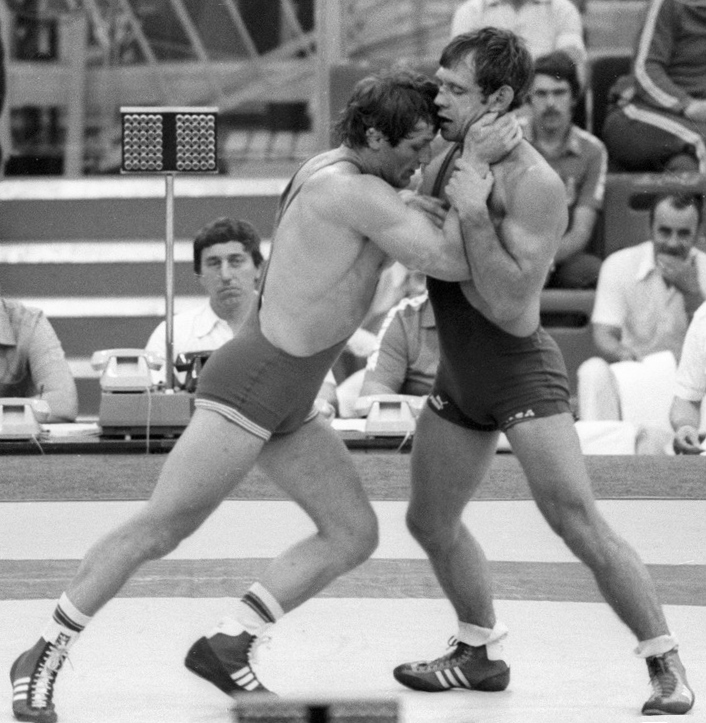
- Kocsis vs. Bykov (right) at the 1980 Olympics

Personal information
- Born: 6 August 1953 (age 72) Magadan, Russian SFSR, Soviet Union
- Height: 170 cm (5 ft 7 in)
- Weight: 74 kg (163 lb)

Sport
- Sport: Greco-Roman wrestling
- Club: Dynamo Almaty
- Coached by: Viktor Yermakov
Medal record
Men's Greco-Roman wrestling
Representing the Soviet Union
Olympic Games
| Gold medal – first place | 1976 Montreal | 74 kg |
| Silver medal – second place | 1980 Moscow | 74 kg |
World Championships
| Gold medal – first place | 1975 Minsk | 74 kg |
European Championships
| Silver medal – second place | 1978 Sofia | 74 kg |

Anatoly Mikhailovich Bykov (Russian: Анатолий Михайлович Быков, born 6 August 1953) is a retired Soviet welterweight Greco-Roman wrestler. He won a world title in 1975 and an Olympic gold medal in 1976, and placed second at the 1978 European Championships and 1980 Olympics, both times behind Ferenc Kocsis.

Bykov lived for many years in Almaty, Kazakhstan, where in 1975 he married and graduated from the institute of physical education. He holds a Kazakhstani passport, but lives in Canada, where he works in building construction.
