= Van Lancker =

Van Lancker is a surname. Notable people with the surname include:

- Alain van Lancker (born 1947), French cyclist
- Anne Van Lancker (born 1954), Belgian politician
- Bart Van Lancker (1973–2021), Belgian football coach
- Eric Van Lancker (born 1961), Belgian cyclist
- Jacques Van Lancker (born 1949), Belgian wrestler
- Robert Van Lancker (born 1946), Belgian track cyclist
- Willem Van Lancker (born 1987), American entrepreneur
- Jos Van Lancker (1908–1987), Belgian painter and sculptor.
