= Ivan Atanasov =

Ivan Atanasov may refer to:

- Ivan Atanasov (ice hockey) (born 1956), Bulgarian ice hockey player
- Ivan Atanasov (weightlifter) (born 1939), Bulgarian weightlifter
- Ivan Atanasov (wrestler) (born 1957), Bulgarian Olympic wrestler
