= Krzesiński =

Krzesiński is a Polish masculine surname, its feminine counterpart is Krzesińska. It may refer to

- Adam Krzesiński (born 1965), Polish fencer
- Elżbieta Krzesińska (1934–2015), Polish long jumper
- Mathilde Kschessinska (1872–1971), Russian ballerina
- Stanisław Krzesiński (born 1950), Polish wrestler
- Silvio Krzesinski (born 1971), Empresário

== See also ==
- Krzesin Landscape Park
