= Mohamed Gaber =

Mohamed Gaber may refer to:

- Mido Gaber, Egyptian footballer
- Mohamed Gaber (wrestler), Egyptian wrestler

== See also ==
- Gaber Mohamed, Egyptian weightlifter
