= Mohamed Mahmoud =

Mohamed Mahmoud or Mohammed Mahmoud (in Arabic محمد محمود) may refer to:

== People ==
- Mohamed Mahmoud Pasha (1877–1941), Egyptian politician, twice Prime Minister of Egypt
- Mohamed Mahmoud (boxer) (born 1971), Egyptian boxer
- Nano (Egyptian footballer) (Mohamed Mahmoud, born 1985), Egyptian footballer
- Mohamed Mahmoud (footballer, born 1998), Egyptian footballer
- Mohamed Mahmoud (Islamic militant), Muslim Austrian militant who joined ISIS
- Mohamed Ali Mahmoud, Egyptian cyclist
- Mohammed Haji Mahmoud, Iraqi Kurdish politician and a leader of the Kurdistan Socialist Democratic Party
- Mohamed Sedky Mahmoud (1914-1984), Egyptian military leader
- Mohammed Moustafa Mahmoud (born 1956), an Iraqi Olympic wrestler

as part of the name

- Ahmed Mohamed Mahmoud (1974–2011), Egyptian journalist, reporter
- Ammar Mohammed Mahmoud, Sudanese diplomat
- Mohamed Mahmoud Abdel Aziz, Egyptian producer and actor
- Hassan Mohamed Mahmoud (born 1984), Egyptian hammer thrower
- Mohamed Mahmoud Ould Louly (born 1943), President of Mauritania
- Mohamed Mahmoud Ould Mohamed Lemine (born 1952), Mauritanian politician
- Mohamed Mahmoud Ould Mohamedou (born 1968), Mauritanian scholar and politician

== Places ==
- Mohamed Mahmoud Khalil Museum, a museum in Greater Cairo, in the Giza area, Egypt

== Others ==
- Mohamed Mahmoud graffiti, a collection of graffiti that was painted on several walls in the area surrounding Mohamed Mahmoud street near Tahrir Square in Cairo, Egypt during the 2011 Egyptian revolution

== See also ==
- Mahmoud Mohamed (disambiguation)
