= Hans Kiss =

Austrian wrestler

Personal information
- Nationality: Austrian
- Born: 9 August 1951 (age 74) Eisenstadt, Austria

Sport
- Sport: Wrestling

Hans Kiss (born 9 August 1951) is an Austrian wrestler. He competed in the men's Greco-Roman 74 kg at the 1976 Summer Olympics.
