= Erol Mutlu =

Turkish wrestler

Personal information
- Nationality: Turkish
- Born: 1 March 1952 (age 74)

Sport
- Sport: Wrestling

Erol Mutlu (born 1 March 1952) is a Turkish wrestler. He competed in the men's Greco-Roman 68 kg at the 1976 Summer Olympics.
