= Mahmoud Mohamed =

Mahmoud Mohamed or Mahmoud Mohammed may refer to:

- Mahmoud Mohamed Shaker, Abu Fahr, Egyptian writer, poet journalist and scholar
- Mahmoud Mohammed Taha (1909–1985), also known as Ustaz Mahmoud Mohammed Taha, Sudanese religious thinker, leader
- Mahmoud Muhammed, Nigerian politician

== See also ==
- Mohamed Mahmoud (disambiguation)
