= Kaj Jægergaard =

Danish wrestler (born 1959)

Personal information
- Nationality: Danish
- Born: 11 September 1959 (age 66) Ringsted, Denmark

Sport
- Sport: Wrestling

Kaj Jægergaard (born 11 September 1959) is a Danish wrestler. He competed in the men's Greco-Roman 74 kg at the 1980 Summer Olympics.
