= Stoyan Apostolov =

Bulgarian wrestler (born 1946)

Medal record

Men's Greco-Roman wrestling

Representing Bulgaria

Olympic Games
Silver medal – second place	1972 Munich	68 kg

Stoyan Apostolov (born 10 April 1946) is a Bulgarian former wrestler who competed in the 1968 Summer Olympics and in the 1972 Summer Olympics.
