= Gheorghe Minea =

Romanian wrestler (born 1959)

Personal information
- Nationality: Romanian
- Born: 22 June 1959 (age 67)

Sport
- Sport: Wrestling

Gheorghe Minea (born 22 June 1959) is a Romanian wrestler. He competed in the men's Greco-Roman 74 kg at the 1980 Summer Olympics.
