= Geghard, Armenia =

Geghard Գեղարդ
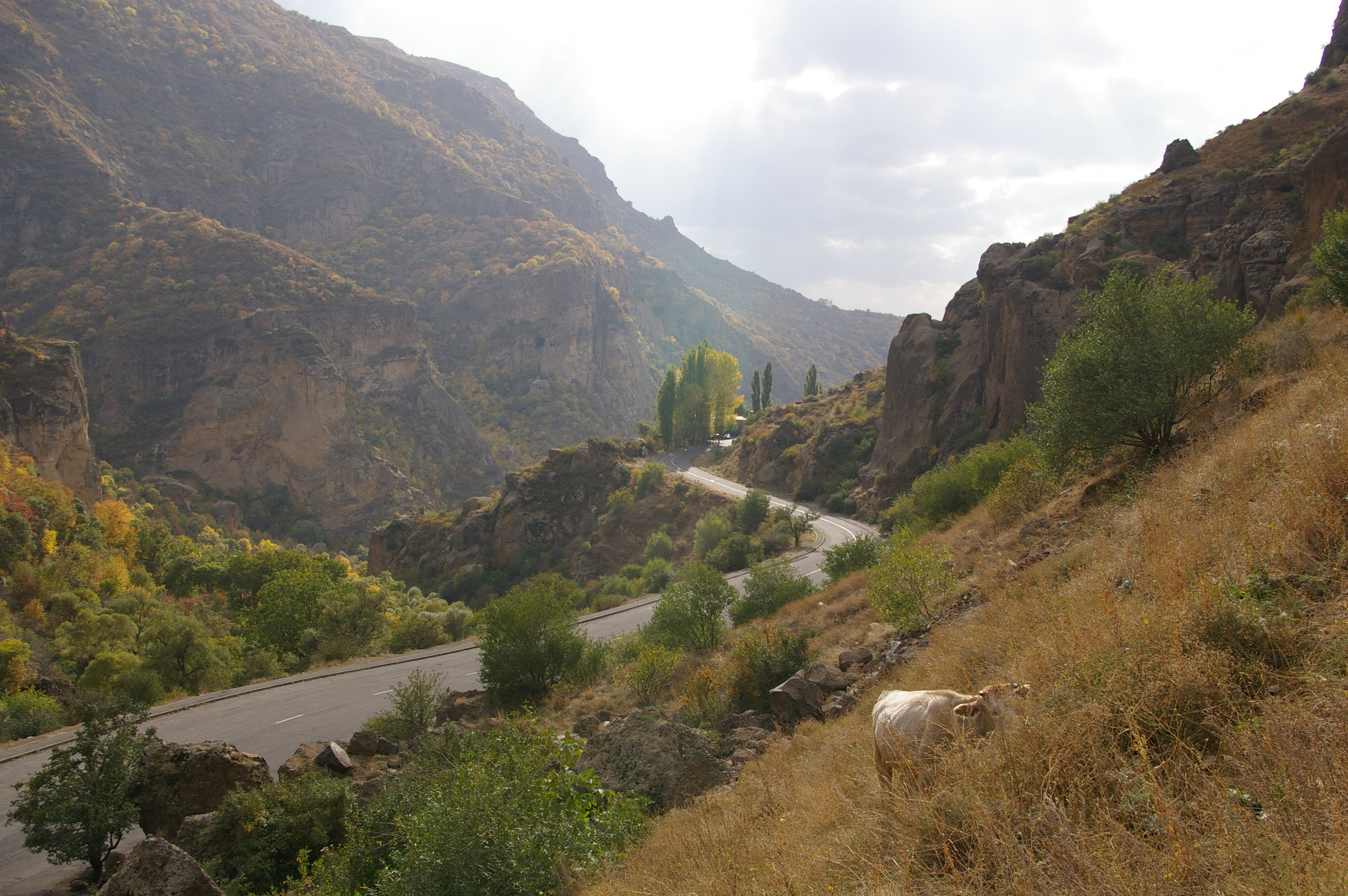
- Geghard landscape

- Location within Armenia
- Coordinates: 40°09′32″N 44°47′48″E
- Country: Armenia
- Marz (Province): Kotayk

Population (2011)
  - Total: 363
- Time zone: UTC+4 ( )

Geghard (Armenian: Գեղարդ, also Romanized as Geghart; formerly, Artiz) is a village in the Kotayk Province of Armenia. The UNESCO World Heritage Site of Geghard monastery is located southeast of Geghard village, near Goght.

== Notable people ==
- Suren Nalbandyan, Olympic gold medalist and European champion in Greco-Roman wrestling

== See also ==
- Kotayk Province
