= Mohamed Moualek =

Algerian wrestler

Personal information
- Nationality: Algerian
- Born: 1 April 1957 (age 69) Alger Center
- Died: 27/09/2015 El biar Alger

Sport
- Sport: Wrestling

Mohamed Moualek (born 1 April 1957) is an Algerian wrestler. He competed in the men's Greco-Roman 68 kg at the 1980 Summer Olympics.
