= Werner Schröter =

German wrestler

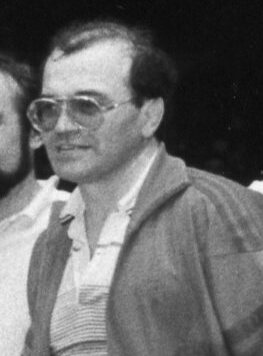
- Schröter in 1988

Personal information
- Nationality: German
- Born: 28 June 1944 (age 82) Heiligenbeil, East Prussia (currently Mamonovo, Russia)

Sport
- Sport: Wrestling

Werner Schröter (born 28 June 1944) is a German former wrestler. He competed in the men's Greco-Roman 74 kg at the 1972 Summer Olympics.
