= Seyyit Hışırlı =

Turkish wrestler

Seyyit Hışırlı (born March 1, 1949) is a Turkish wrestler.

Hışırlı competed at the 1972 Summer Olympics in the Greco-Roman 68 kg division, and at the 1970 FILA Wrestling World Championships.
