= Jafar Alizadeh =

Iranian wrestler

Personal information
- Nationality: Iranian
- Born: 1 October 1956 (age 69)

Sport
- Sport: Wrestling

Jafar Alizadeh (Persian: جعفر علی‌زاده, born 1 October 1956) is an Iranian wrestler. He competed in the men's Greco-Roman 68 kg at the 1976 Summer Olympics.
