= Sotirios Nakos =

Greek wrestler

Personal information
- Nationality: Greek
- Born: 3 January 1949 (age 77)

Sport
- Sport: Wrestling

Sotirios Nakos (born 3 January 1949) is a Greek wrestler. He competed in the men's Greco-Roman 68 kg at the 1972 Summer Olympics.
