= John McPhedran =

Canadian wrestler (1949–2015)

Personal information
- Born: 17 September 1949 Fergus, Ontario, Canada
- Died: 7 August 2015 (aged 65)

Sport
- Sport: Wrestling

John McPhedran (17 September 1949 – 7 August 2015) was a Canadian wrestler. He competed in the men's Greco-Roman 68 kg at the 1976 Summer Olympics.
