= Ferenc Čaba =

Yugoslav wrestler (born 1954)

Personal information
- Nationality: Yugoslav
- Born: 11 February 1954 (age 72) Kanjiža, Serbia

Sport
- Sport: Wrestling

Ferenc Čaba (born 11 February 1954) is a Yugoslav wrestler. He competed in the men's Greco-Roman 68 kg at the 1980 Summer Olympics.
