= Wiesław Dziadura =

Polish wrestler

Personal information
- Nationality: Polish
- Born: 20 October 1956 (age 70) Gdańsk, Poland

Sport
- Sport: Wrestling

Wiesław Dziadura (born 20 October 1956) is a Polish wrestler. He competed in the men's Greco-Roman 74 kg at the 1980 Summer Olympics.
