= Nedelcho Nedev =

Bulgarian wrestler

Personal information
- Nationality: Bulgarian
- Born: 18 September 1948 (age 77) Beloslav, Bulgaria

Sport
- Sport: Wrestling

Nedelcho Nedev (born 18 September 1948) is a Bulgarian wrestler. He competed in the men's Greco-Roman 68 kg at the 1976 Summer Olympics.
