= Erasmo Estrada =

Cuban wrestler (born 1958)

Personal information
- Full name: Erasmo Estrada Sánchez
- Nationality: Cuban
- Born: 31 August 1958 (age 67)
- Height: 178 cm (5 ft 10 in)

Sport
- Sport: Wrestling
Medal record
Men's Greco-Roman wrestling
Representing Cuba
Pan American Games
Silver medal – second place	1979 San Juan	82 kg

Erasmo Estrada Sánchez (born 31 August 1958) is a Cuban wrestler. He competed in the men's Greco-Roman 68 kg at the 1976 Summer Olympics.
