= Tage Juhl Weirum =

Danish wrestler (born 1949)

Personal information
- Nationality: Danish
- Born: 16 February 1949 (age 77) Frederiksværk, Denmark

Sport
- Sport: Wrestling

Tage Juhl Weirum (born 16 February 1949) is a Danish wrestler. He competed in the men's Greco-Roman 68 kg at the 1972 Summer Olympics. The ninth at the World Championships in 1977. Fifth at the European Championships in 1970. He won five medals at the Nordic Championships in 1970-1978.
