= Takeshi Kobayashi (wrestler) =

Japanese wrestler (born 1948)

Personal information
- Nationality: Japanese
- Born: 22 June 1948 (age 78) Hiroshima, Japan

Sport
- Sport: Wrestling

Takeshi Kobayashi (小林 武, Kobayashi Takeshi; born 22 June 1948) is a Japanese wrestler. He competed in the men's Greco-Roman 68 kg at the 1976 Summer Olympics.
