= Buyandelgeriin Bold =

Mongolian wrestler (born 1960)

Personal information
- Nationality: Mongolian
- Born: 25 August 1960 (age 65) Ulaanbaatar, Mongolia

Sport
- Sport: Freestyle Wrestling
- Weight class: 68 kg
Medal record
Representing Mongolia
Men's Freestyle wrestling
World Championships
Silver medal – second place	1983 Kiev	68 kg
Silver medal – second place	1985 Budapest	68 kg
World Cup
Bronze medal – third place	1981 Toledo	68 kg
Asian Games
Gold medal – first place	1982 New Delhi	68 kg
Junior World Championships
Silver medal – second place	1979 Ulaanbaatar	68 kg

Buyandelgeriin Bold (born 25 August 1960) is a Mongolian wrestler. He competed in the men's Greco-Roman 68 kg at the 1980 Summer Olympics.
