= Yasuo Nagatomo =

Japanese wrestler (born 1951)

Personal information
- Nationality: Japanese
- Born: 12 December 1951 (age 74)

Sport
- Sport: Wrestling

Yasuo Nagatomo (長友 寧雄, Nagatomo Yasuo; born 12 December 1951) is a Japanese former wrestler. He competed in the men's Greco-Roman 74 kg at the 1976 Summer Olympics.
