= Karl-Heinz Helbing =

German wrestler (born 1957)

Medal record

Men's Greco-Roman wrestling

Representing West Germany

Olympic Games
| Bronze medal – third place | 1976 Montreal | welterweight |

Karl-Heinz Helbing (born 7 March 1957 in Mainz) is a German former wrestler who competed in the 1976 Summer Olympics and in the 1984 Summer Olympics.
