= Krmelín =

- Municipality
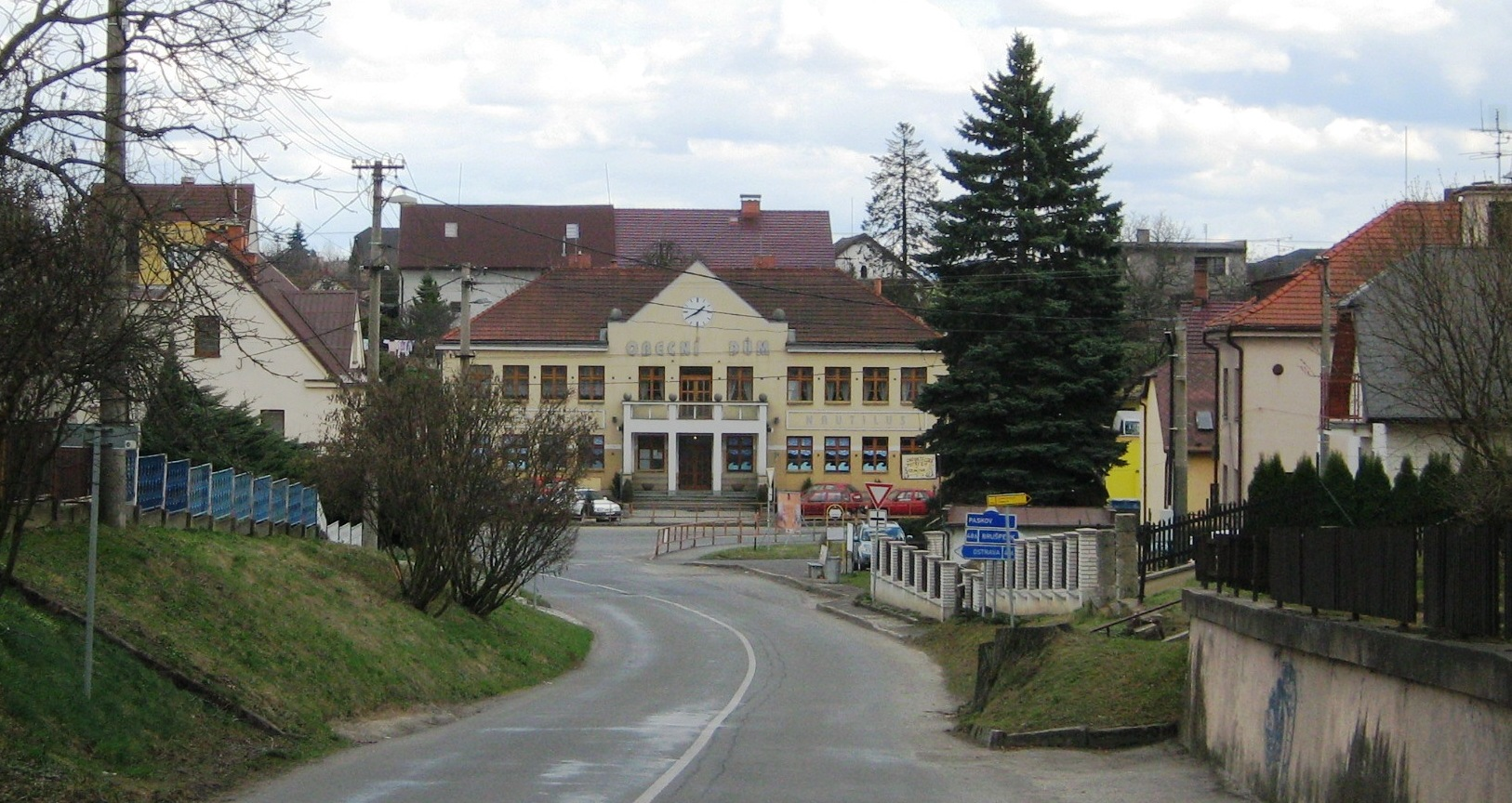
- Centre of Krmelín

- Flag Coat of arms

- Location in the Czech Republic
- Coordinates: 49°43′45″N 18°14′8″E
- Country: Czech Republic
- Region: Moravian-Silesian
- District: Frýdek-Místek
- First mentioned: 1447

Area
  - Total: 5.04 km^{2} (1.95 sq mi)
- Elevation: 264 m (866 ft)

Population (2026-01-01)
  - Total: 2,381
  - Density: 472/km^{2} (1,220/sq mi)
- Time zone: UTC+1 (CET)
  - Summer (DST): UTC+2 (CEST)
- Postal code: 739 24
- Website: www.krmelin.cz

Krmelín is a municipality and village in Frýdek-Místek District in the Moravian-Silesian Region of the Czech Republic. It has about 2,400 inhabitants.

== Geography ==
Krmelín is located about 9 kilometres (6 mi) northwest of Frýdek-Místek and 7 km (4 mi) south of Ostrava. It lies on the border between the Moravian Gate and Moravian-Silesian Foothills. The highest point is the hill Krmelínský kopec at 332 m (1,089 ft) above sea level.

== History ==
The first written mention of Krmelín is from 1447.

== Demographics ==
Historical population

| Year | Pop. | ±% |
|---|---|---|
| 1869 | 705 | — |
| 1880 | 702 | −0.4% |
| 1890 | 835 | +18.9% |
| 1900 | 942 | +12.8% |
| 1910 | 1,004 | +6.6% |

| Year | Pop. | ±% |
|---|---|---|
| 1921 | 1,077 | +7.3% |
| 1930 | 1,194 | +10.9% |
| 1950 | 1,049 | −12.1% |
| 1961 | 1,334 | +27.2% |
| 1970 | 1,400 | +4.9% |

| Year | Pop. | ±% |
|---|---|---|
| 1980 | 1,649 | +17.8% |
| 1991 | 1,808 | +9.6% |
| 2001 | 1,818 | +0.6% |
| 2011 | 2,180 | +19.9% |
| 2021 | 2,289 | +5.0% |

Source: Censuses

== Transport ==
The I/58 road from Ostrava to Rožnov pod Radhoštěm runs through the municipality.

== Sights ==
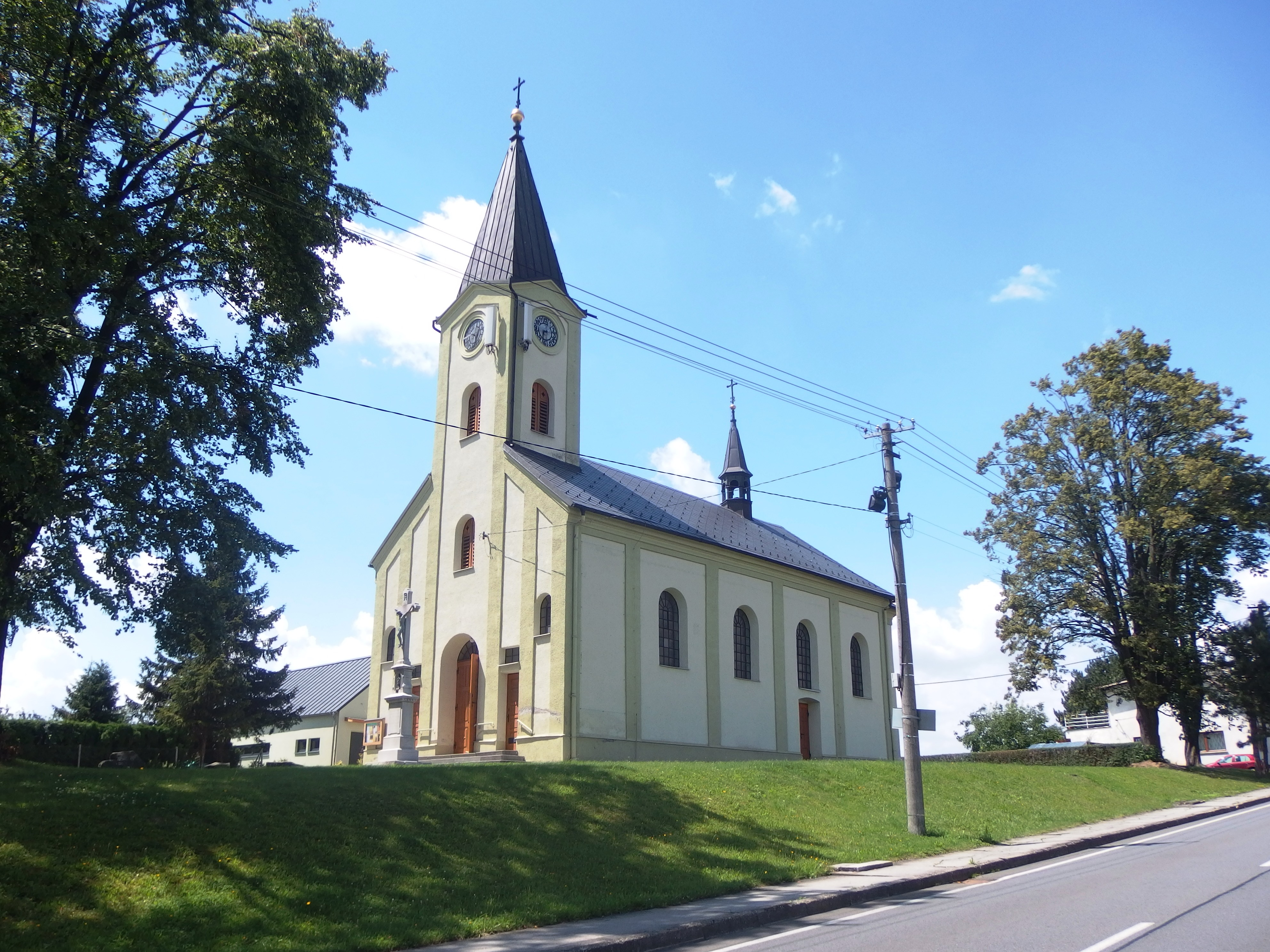
Church of Saints John and Paul

The only protected cultural monuments are the two stone crosses from the years 1858 and 1868.

The main landmark of Krmelín is the Church of Saints John and Paul. Originally built as a chapel, its construction was finished in 1900.

== Notable people ==
- Vítězslav Mácha (1948–2023), wrestler, Olympic winner
