= Petros Galaktopoulos =

Greek wrestler (born 1945)

Medal record

Men's Greco-Roman wrestling

Representing Greece

Olympic Games
Silver medal – second place	1972 Munich	74 kg
Bronze medal – third place	1968 Mexico City	70 kg

World Championships
Bronze medal – third place	1970 Edmonton	Welterweight
Bronze medal – third place	1971 Sofia	Welterweight

European Championships
Gold medal – first place	1972 Katowice	Welterweight
Bronze medal – third place	1976 Leningrad	Welterweight

Mediterranean Games
Silver medal – second place	1967 Tunis	Lightweight

Petros Galaktopoulos (Greek: Πέτρος Γαλακτόπουλος; born 7 June 1945) is a Greek former Olympic Greco-Roman wrestler. Born in Athens, Galaktopoulos competed in five olympic tournaments from 1964 till 1976. He won two olympic medals, in the 1968 and 1972 Summer Olympics. He was named the 1968 and 1972 Greek Athlete of the Year.

== Career ==
Galaktopoulos was born in Athens, Greece and he was member of Ethnikos G.S. Athens. During his career as a Greco-Roman wrestler, Galaktopoulos won many trophies at European and international level. At the 1964 Olympics, Galaktopoulos competed at the featherweight event and he took the 15th place. At the 1968 Olympics, he competed at the lightweight event. In seven matches, Galaktopoulos lost only to the winner of the category, Muneji Munemura and as a result he won the bronze medal. During 1972 Olympics, Galaktopoulos won the silver medal at the 74 kg class after losing to Vítězslav Mácha at the final. Four years later, at the 1976 Summer Olympics, he reached 8th place.
