= Reinhard Hartmann (wrestler) =

Austrian wrestler

Personal information
- Nationality: Austrian
- Born: 3 November 1953 (age 72) Feldkirch, Austria

Sport
- Sport: Wrestling

Reinhard Hartmann (born 3 November 1953) is an Austrian wrestler. He competed in the men's Greco-Roman 68 kg at the 1980 Summer Olympics.
