= Ferenc Toma =

Hungarian wrestler

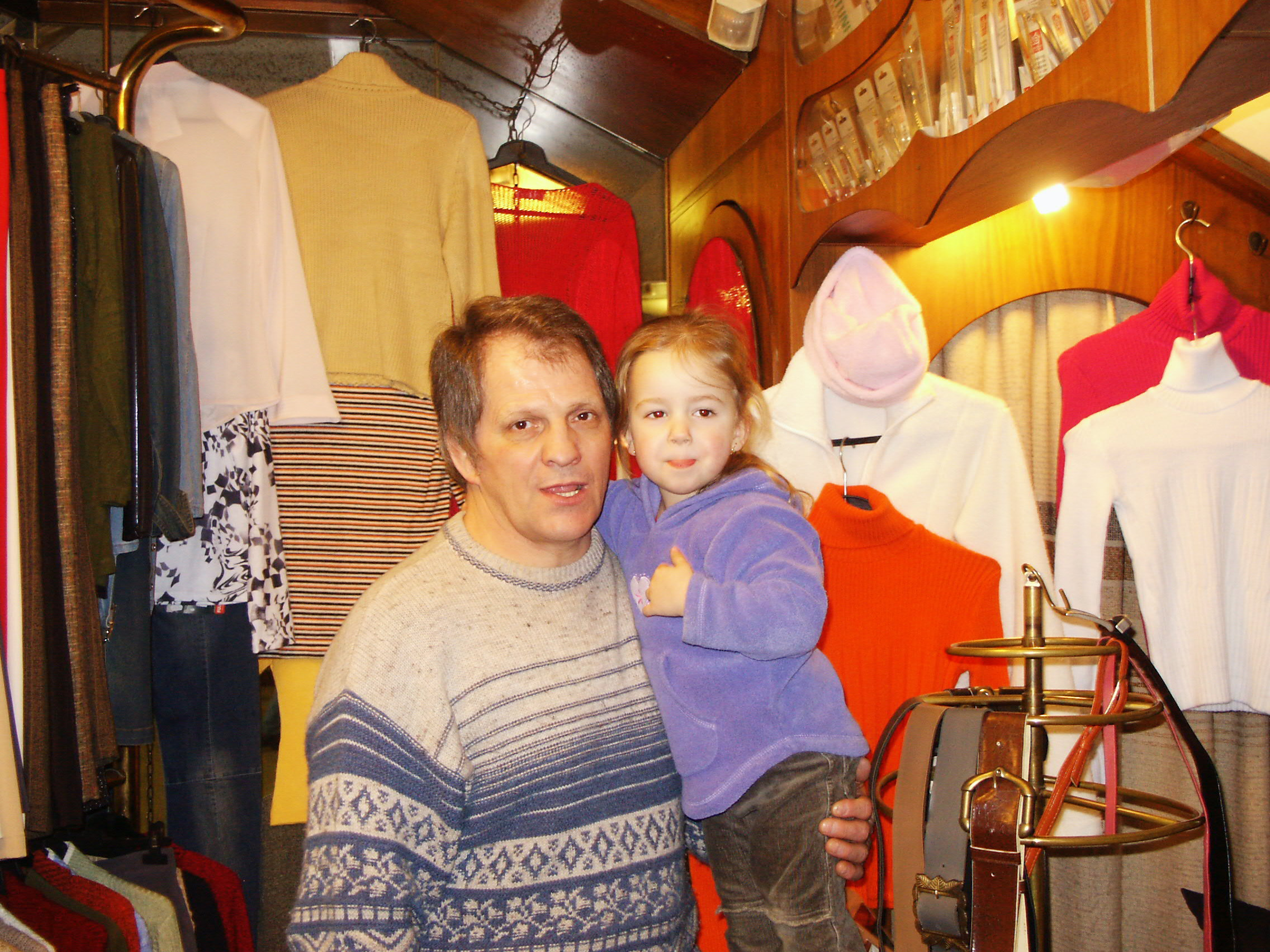

Personal information
- Nationality: Hungarian
- Born: 22 March 1949 Nagybánhegyes, Hungary
- Died: 14 December 2011 (aged 62) Budapest, Hungary

Sport
- Sport: Wrestling

Ferenc Toma (22 March 1949 – 14 December 2011) was a Hungarian wrestler. He competed in the men's Greco-Roman 68 kg at the 1976 Summer Olympics.
