= Károly Gaál =

Hungarian wrestler

Personal information
- Nationality: Hungarian
- Born: 14 March 1954 (age 72) Budapest, Hungary

Sport
- Sport: Wrestling

Károly Gaál (born 14 March 1954) is a Hungarian wrestler. He competed in the men's Greco-Roman 68 kg at the 1980 Summer Olympics.
