= Kim Hae-myeong =

South Korean wrestler

Personal information
- Nationality: South Korean
- Born: 8 October 1956 (age 69)

Sport
- Sport: Wrestling

Kim Hae-myeong (born 8 October 1956) is a South Korean wrestler. He competed in the men's Greco-Roman 68 kg at the 1976 Summer Olympics.
