= Brahim Toughza =

Moroccan wrestler

Personal information
- Nationality: Moroccan
- Born: 1951 (age 74–75)

Sport
- Sport: Wrestling

Brahim Toughza (born 1951) is a Moroccan wrestler. He competed in the men's Greco-Roman 74 kg at the 1976 Summer Olympics.
