= Markku Yli-Isotalo =

Finnish wrestler

Personal information
- Nationality: Finnish
- Born: 9 November 1952 Kuortane, Finland
- Died: 2 August 2011 (aged 58) Seinäjoki, Finland

Sport
- Sport: Wrestling

Markku Yli-Isotalo (9 November 1952 – 2 August 2011) was a Finnish wrestler. He competed in the men's Greco-Roman 68 kg at the 1976 Summer Olympics.
