= Takashi Tanoue =

Japanese wrestler

Takashi Tanuoe
- Born: 田上 高 April 30, 1947; Yatsushiro, Kumamoto Prefecture, Japan
- Died: February 19, 2009 (aged 61); Ibusuki, Kagoshima Prefecture, Japan
- Occupation: Wrestler
- Known for: 1972 Summer Olympics
- Height: 170 cm (5.6 ft)

Takashi Tanoue (30 April 1947 – 19 February 2009) was a Japanese wrestler who competed in the 1972 Summer Olympics, placing 5th overall in the Greco-Roman event.

== Early life ==
Takashi Tanoue was born on April 30, 1947 in Yatsushiro, Kumamoto Prefecture, Japan. He died on February 19, 2009 in Ibusuki, Kagoshima Prefecture, Japan aged 61.
