= Marcel Vlad =

Romanian wrestler (born 1948)

Marcel Vlad (born 5 February 1948) is a Romanian former wrestler who competed in the 1972 Summer Olympics.
