= Mohammed Moustafa Mahmoud =

Iraqi wrestler

Personal information
- Nationality: Iraqi
- Born: 1956 (age 69–70)

Sport
- Sport: Wrestling

Mohammed Moustafa Mahmoud (Arabic: محمد مصطفى محمود, born 1956) is an Iraqi wrestler. He competed in the men's Greco-Roman 68 kg at the 1980 Summer Olympics.
