= Lionel Lacaze =

French wrestler

Personal information
- Nationality: French
- Born: 24 March 1955 (age 70)

Sport
- Sport: Wrestling

Lionel Lacaze (born 24 March 1955) is a French wrestler. He competed at the 1976 Summer Olympics and the 1980 Summer Olympics.
