= Mehmet Türüt =

Turkish wrestler

Mehmet Türüt (1 January 1945 – 26 February 1995) was a Turkish wrestler who competed in the 1972 Summer Olympics.
