= Constant Bens =

Belgian wrestler

Constant Bens (born 26 November 1941) is a Belgian former wrestler who competed in the 1972 Summer Olympics.
