= Sakhidad Hamidi =

Afghan wrestler (born 1952)

Sakhidad Hamidi (born 10 October 1952) is an Afghan former wrestler who competed in the 1980 Summer Olympics.
