= Khaled El-Khaled =

Syrian wrestler (born 1951)

Khaled El-Khaled (born 6 May 1951) is a Syrian former wrestler who competed in the 1980 Summer Olympics.
