= Ivan Atanasov (wrestler) =

Bulgarian wrestler (born 1957)

Personal information
- Nationality: Bulgarian
- Born: 31 October 1957 (age 69)

Sport
- Sport: Wrestling

Ivan Atanasov (born 31 October 1957) is a Bulgarian wrestler. He competed in the men's Greco-Roman 68 kg at the 1980 Summer Olympics.
