= Josef Brötzner =

Austrian wrestler

Josef Brötzner (born 5 March 1945) is an Austrian former wrestler who competed in the 1972 Summer Olympics.
