= Gian Matteo Ranzi =

Italian wrestler (born 1948)

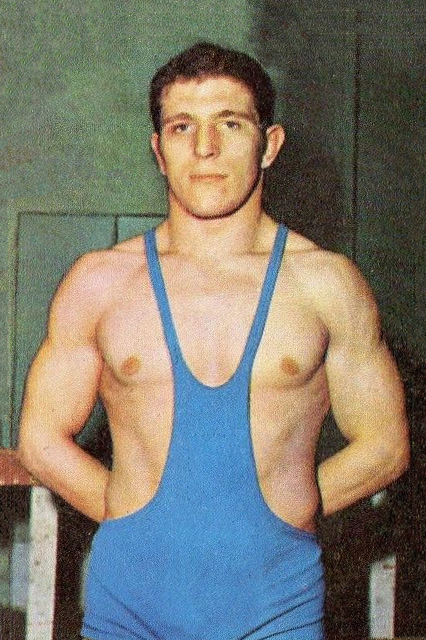

Personal information
- Born: 31 January 1948 (age 78) Faenza, Italy
- Height: 1.68 m (5 ft 6 in)
- Weight: 74 kg (163 lb)

Sport
- Sport: Greco-Roman wrestling
Medal record
Representing Italy
Olympic Games
Bronze medal – third place	1972 Munich	Lightweight

Gian Matteo Ranzi (born 31 January 1948) is a retired Italian lightweight wrestler who won a bronze medal at the 1972 Summer Olympics in Greco-Roman wrestling. He also won two medals at the Mediterranean Games, a gold in 1975 and a silver in 1971.
