= Mikko Huhtala =

Finnish wrestler (born 1952)

Medal record

Men's Greco-Roman Wrestling

Representing Finland

Olympic Games
Bronze medal – third place	1980 Moscow	74 kg

World Championships
Silver medal – second place	1981 Oslo	74 kg

European Championships
Silver medal – second place	1980 Prievidza	74 kg

Mikko Kustaa Huhtala (born 30 March 1952 in Lapua) is a Finnish retired Greco-Roman style wrestler.
