= Lennart Lundell =

Swedish wrestler

Personal information
- Nationality: Swedish
- Born: 2 August 1956 (age 68); Lidköping, Sweden

Sport
- Sport: Wrestling

Lennart Lundell (born 2 August 1956) is a Swedish wrestler. He competed at the 1976 Summer Olympics, the 1980 Summer Olympics and the 1984 Summer Olympics.
