= Miklós Hegedűs =

Hungarian wrestler

Miklós Hegedűs (born 2 December 1946 in Rábasömjén) is a Hungarian former wrestler who competed in the 1972 Summer Olympics.
