= Momir Kecman =

Serbian wrestler (born 1940)

Personal information
- Nationality: Serbian
- Born: 10 December 1940 (age 85) Krnja Jela, Bosanski Petrovac, Bosna i Hercegovina Jugoslavia
- Weight: 74 kg (163 lb)

Sport
- Sport: Men's Wrestling
- Club: RK Radnicki Beograd

Momir Kecman
Medal record

Representing Yugoslavia

Men's Wrestling

World Championships
Silver medal – second place	1971 Sofia	Welterweight

European Championships
Silver medal – second place	1969 Modena	74kg
Silver medal – second place	1970 Berlin	74kg

Mediterranean Games
Silver medal – second place	1971 Izmir	74kg

Momir Kecman (December 10, 1940, Krnja Jela, Bosanski Petrovac, Bosna i Hercegovina) is a Serbian former wrestler who competed in the 1972 Summer Olympics.
