= Lars-Erik Skiöld =

Swedish wrestler (1952–2017)

Medal record

Representing Sweden

Men's Greco-Roman wrestling

Olympic Games
Bronze medal – third place	1980 Moscow	Lightweight

Lars-Erik Skiöld (19 March 1952 – 21 May 2017) was a Swedish wrestler born in Malmö. He won an Olympic bronze medal in Greco-Roman wrestling in 1980. He also competed at the 1976 Olympics, placing fourth. He won a silver medal at the 1977 World Wrestling Championships.

Skiöld died on 21 May 2017 at the age of 65.
