= Klaus Pohl (wrestler) =

German wrestler

Klaus-Jürgen Pohl (born 1 August 1941 in Demmin) is a German former wrestler who competed in the 1968 Summer Olympics and in the 1972 Summer Olympics.
