= Ferenc Kocsis =

Hungarian wrestler (born 1953)

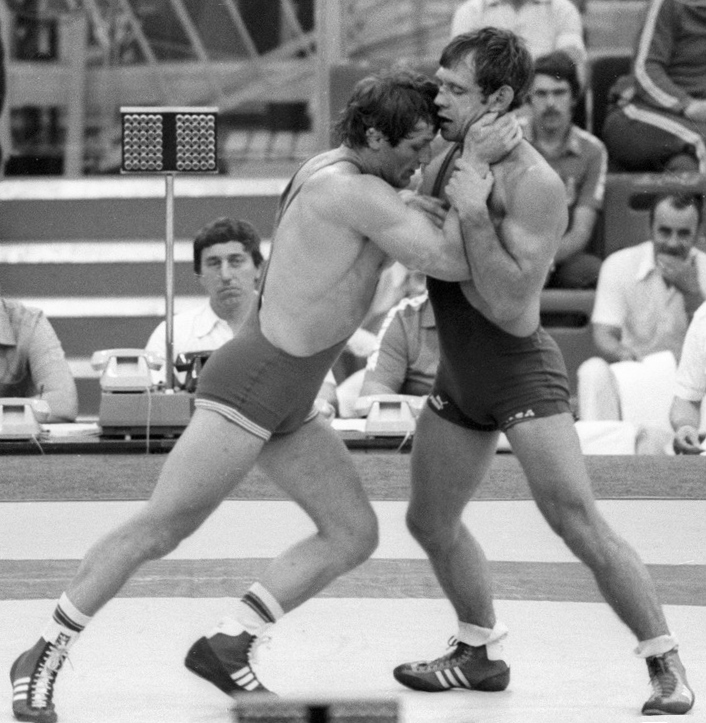
- Kocsis (left) at the 1980 Olympics

Personal information
- Born: 8 July 1953 (age 73) Budapest, Hungary
- Height: 173 cm (5 ft 8 in)
- Weight: 74 kg (163 lb)

Sport
- Sport: Greco-Roman wrestling
Medal record
Men's Greco-Roman wrestling
Representing Hungary
Olympic Games
Gold medal – first place	1980 Moscow	74 kg
World Championships
Gold medal – first place	1979 San Diego	74 kg
Silver medal – second place	1978 Mexico City	74 kg
Bronze medal – third place	1977 Gothenburg	74 kg
European Championships
Gold medal – first place	1978 Sofia	74 kg
Gold medal – first place	1979 Bucharest	74 kg
Gold medal – first place	1981 Gothenburg	74 kg
Gold medal – first place	1983 Budapest	74 kg

Ferenc Kocsis (born 8 July 1953) is a retired welterweight Greco-Roman wrestler from Hungary. He won an Olympic gold medal in 1980, a world title in 1979, and European titles in 1978, 1979, 1981 and 1983.
