= Mohamed Gaber (wrestler) =

Egyptian wrestler

Personal information
- Nationality: Egyptian
- Born: 25 October 1946 (age 79)

Sport
- Sport: Wrestling

Mohamed Gaber (born 25 October 1946) is an Egyptian wrestler. He competed in the men's Greco-Roman 68 kg at the 1972 Summer Olympics.
