= Jamal Moughrabi =

Syrian wrestler

Jamal Moughrabi (born 8 April 1957) is a Syrian former wrestler who competed in the 1980 Summer Olympics, losing both his matches.
