= Heinz Rhyn =

Swiss wrestler (born 1949)

Heinz Rhyn (born 20 September 1949) is a Swiss former wrestler who competed in the 1972 Summer Olympics.
