= Suren Nalbandyan =

Olympic wrestler (born 1956)

Personal information
- Born: 3 June 1956 (age 70) Geghard, Armenian SSR, Soviet Union
- Height: 1.63 m (5 ft 4 in)
- Weight: 68 kg (150 lb)

Sport
- Sport: Wrestling
- Event: Greco-Roman
- Club: VS Astrakhan; VS Rostov-on-Don
- Coached by: G. Sapunow; Vladimir Fomin
Medal record
Representing Soviet Union
Men's Greco-Roman wrestling
Olympic Games
Gold medal – first place	1976 Montreal	68 kg
European Championships
Bronze medal – third place	1976 Leningrad	62 kg
Gold medal – first place	1977 Bursa	68 kg

Suren Nalbandyan (Armenian: Սուրեն Նալբանդյան, born June 3, 1956) is a former Soviet Armenian Greco-Roman wrestler. He is a five-time Soviet Champion, European Champion and Olympic Champion. He was awarded the Honoured Master of Sports of the USSR and USSR Badge of Honor titles in 1976.

== Early life ==
Suren was born in the village of Geghard in the Abovyan region of the Armenian SSR. In 1964, his family moved to Astrakhan, where, in 1969, he began to compete in Greco-Roman wrestling under the leadership of Honored Coach of the RSFSR, Vladimir Fomin. He won the USSR Championship in 1972 and 1974 among junior.

== Career ==
In 1975, Nalbandyan won the USSR Championship as a senior and won a gold medal at the Junior World Championship. In 1976, he won the Championship of the Soviet Union again and became a member of the USSR national Greco-Roman wrestling team.

Nalbandyan won a bronze medal at the 1976 European Wrestling Championships. Shortly afterward, he was chosen to participate at the 1976 Summer Olympics in Montreal. Nalbandyan won an Olympic gold medal. He became the first Armenian wrestler to become an Olympic Champion. The following year, he became the Champion of the USSR again and won a gold medal at the 1977 European Wrestling Championships. He was a member of the Soviet team at the 1980 Summer Olympics in Moscow, but came in fourth place and was unable to win a medal. Nalbandyan then completed his wrestling career.

He was never called up to compete at the World Wrestling Championships despite winning the Soviet Championships five times.

Later, Nalbandyan began coaching. He developed a scientific approach to the general physical, power and speed training of young wrestlers.
