= Veikko Lavonen =

Finnish wrestler

Veikko Tapani Lavonen (born 1 February 1945 in Keuruu) is a Finnish former wrestler who competed in the 1972 Summer Olympics.
