= Mohamed Bahamou =

Moroccan wrestler

Personal information
- Nationality: Moroccan
- Born: 26 May 1945 (age 79)

Sport
- Sport: Wrestling

Mohamed Bahamou (born 26 May 1945) is a Moroccan wrestler. He competed at the 1972 Summer Olympics and the 1976 Summer Olympics.
