= Idalberto Barban =

Cuban wrestler (born 1953)

Personal information
- Full name: Idalberto Barban Reyna
- Nationality: Cuban
- Born: 25 May 1953 (age 73)
- Height: 175 cm (5 ft 9 in)

Sport
- Sport: Wrestling
Medal record
Men's Greco-Roman wrestling
Representing Cuba
Pan American Games
Silver medal – second place	1979 San Juan	74 kg

Idalberto Barban Reyna (born 25 May 1953) is a Cuban wrestler. He competed at the 1976 Summer Olympics and the 1980 Summer Olympics.
