= Manfred Schöndorfer =

German wrestler

Manfred Schöndorfer (born 28 October 1948) is a German former wrestler who competed in the 1972 Summer Olympics and in the 1976 Summer Olympics. He was born in Bad Reichenhall.
