= Antal Steer =

Hungarian wrestler (1943–2026)

Personal information
- Nationality: Hungarian
- Born: 10 October 1943 Bratislava, Slovak Republic
- Died: October 2026 (aged 83)

Sport
- Sport: Wrestling

Antal Steer (10 October 1943 – October 2026) was a Hungarian wrestler. He competed at the 1968 Summer Olympics and the 1972 Summer Olympics. Steer died in October 2026, at the age of 83.
