= Vítězslav Mácha =

Czech wrestler (1948–2023)

- Born: 6 April 1948; Krmelín, Czechoslovakia
- Died: 29 May 2023 (aged 75)
- Occupation: Wrestler

Vítězslav Mácha
Medal record

Men's Greco-Roman wrestling

Representing Czechoslovakia

Olympic Games
| Gold medal – first place | 1972 Munich | Welterweight |
| Silver medal – second place | 1976 Montreal | Welterweight |

Vítězslav Mácha (6 April 1948 – 29 May 2023) was a Czech wrestler.

Mácha was born in Krmelín on 6 April 1948. He won an Olympic gold medal in Greco-Roman wrestling in 1972, competing for Czechoslovakia. He won a gold medal at the 1974 and 1977 World Wrestling Championships. Mácha died on 29 May 2023, at the age of 75.
