= Andrzej Supron =

Polish Greco-Roman wrestler

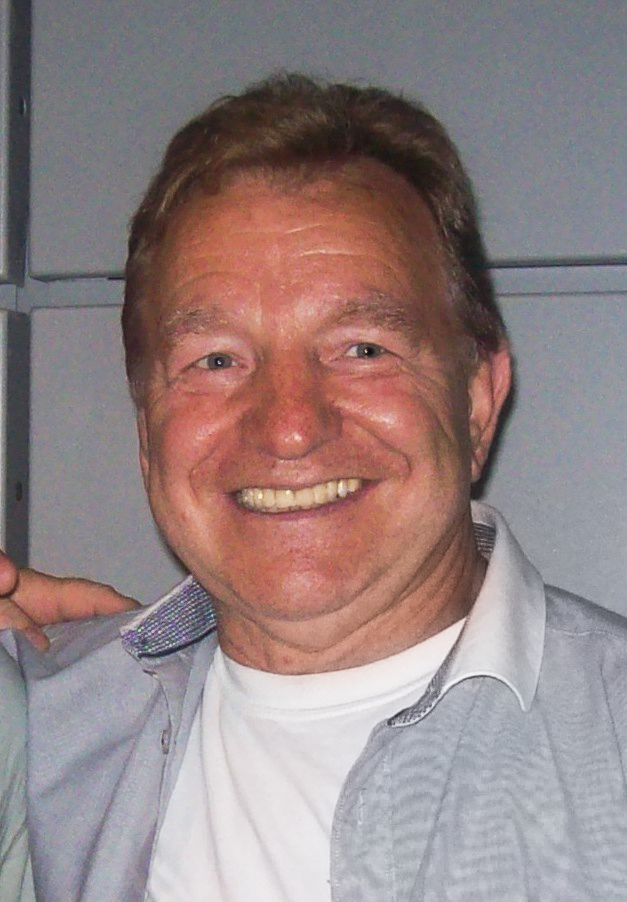

Personal information
- Born: 22 October 1952 (age 73) Warsaw, Poland

Sport
- Sport: Greco-Roman wrestling
Medal record
Representing Poland
Olympic Games
Silver medal – second place	1980 Moscow	Lightweight
World Championships
Gold medal – first place	1979 San Diego	Lightweight
Silver medal – second place	1975 Minsk	Lightweight
Silver medal – second place	1978 Mexico City	Lightweight
Silver medal – second place	1982 Katowice	Welterweight
Silver medal – second place	1983 Kiev	Welterweight
Bronze medal – third place	1974 Katowice	Lightweight
European Championships
Gold medal – first place	1975 Ludwigshafen	Lightweight
Gold medal – first place	1982 Varna	Welterweight
Silver medal – second place	1974 Madrid	Lightweight
Silver medal – second place	1983 Budapest	Welterweight
Bronze medal – third place	1972 Katowice	Lightweight
Bronze medal – third place	1979 Bucharest	Lightweight
Bronze medal – third place	1981 Gothenburg	Welterweight
Summer Universiade
Bronze medal – third place	1977 Sofia	Lightweight

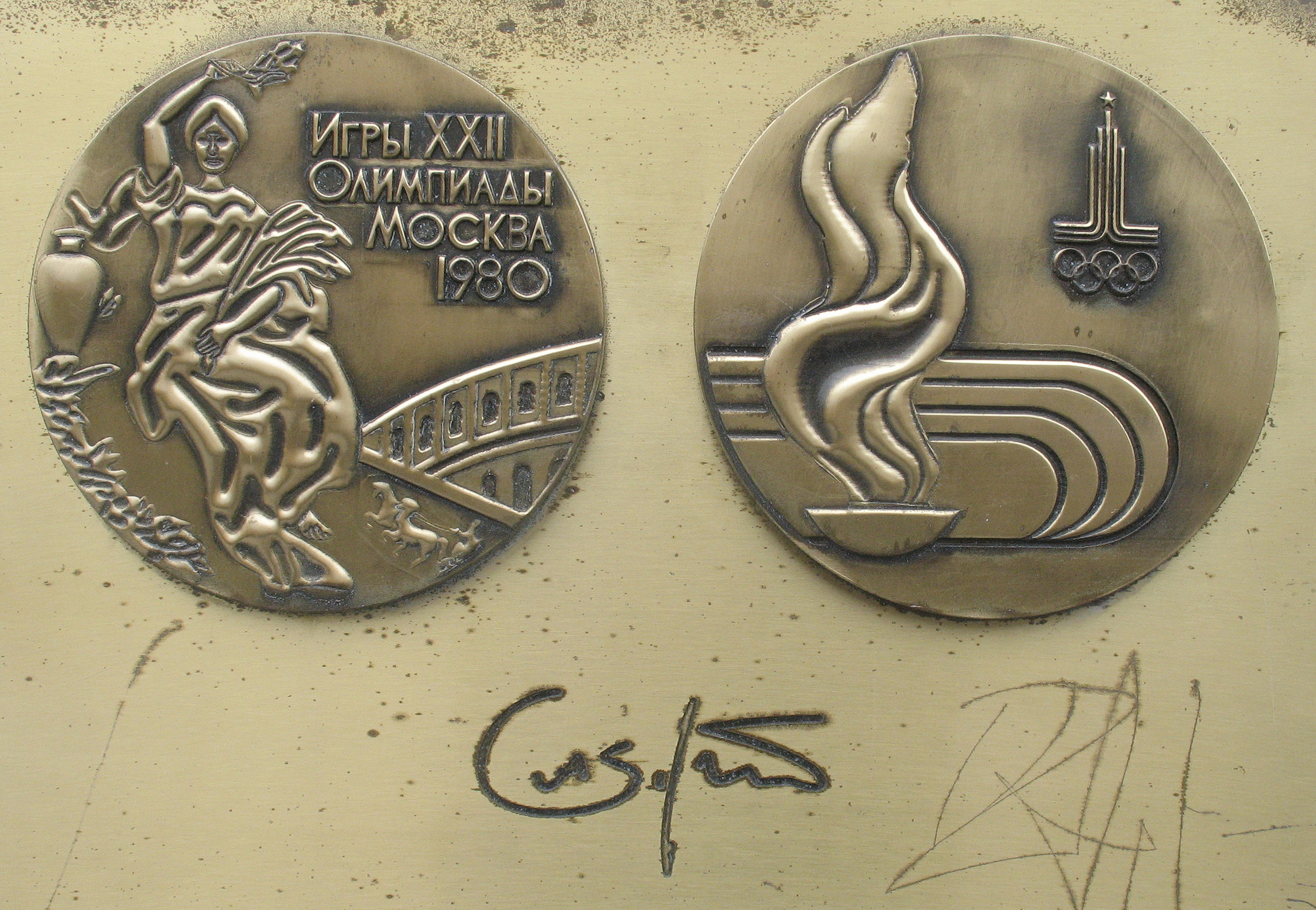
Copy of A. Supron medal and autograph in Sports Star Avenue in Dziwnów

Andrzej Supron (born 22 October 1952) is a Polish wrestler (Greco-Roman style) who completed for Poland at the 1972 Summer Olympics and the 1976 Summer Olympics. He won a silver medal for Poland at the 1980 Summer Olympics in the 68 kg (lightweight) event.
