= Djan-Aka Djan =

Afghan wrestler

Djan-Aka Djan (born 1942) is a retired Afghanistan wrestler who was a national champion. He competed at the 1964 Summer Olympic Games, the 1968 Summer Olympics, the 1972 Summer Olympic Games in the lightweight events.
