= Stanisław Krzesiński =

Polish wrestler

Stanisław Krzesiński (born 3 February 1950 in Białobrzegi) is a Polish former wrestler who competed in the 1972 Summer Olympics and in the 1976 Summer Olympics.
