= Jacques Van Lancker =

Belgian wrestler

Personal information
- Nationality: Belgian
- Born: 21 September 1949 (age 77) Antwerp, Belgium

Sport
- Sport: Wrestling

Jacques Van Lancker (born 21 September 1949) is a Belgian wrestler. He competed at the 1976 Summer Olympics and the 1980 Summer Olympics.
